= List of Boston Bulldogs (AFL) players =

The following people played for the Boston Bulldogs for at least one game in the 1926 AFL regular season, the only one of the team’s (and the league’s) existence:

Name	Position	College
Ned Coleman	Guard^{1}	Holy Cross
Phil Corrigan	Back^{2}	Boston College
Bill Cronin	Tailback	Boston College
Carl Etelman^{3}	Back^{4}	Tufts
Erwin Gehrke	Back^{2}	Harvard
Johnny Gilroy	Tailback^{5}	Georgetown University
Ralph Gilroy	Tailback^{6}	Princeton
Vern Hagenbuckle^{3}	Guard	Dartmouth
Oscar Johnson	Fullback^{5}	Vermont
Bull Lowe^{7}	End	Fordham, Lafayette College
Joe McGlone^{8}	Blocking Back^{9}	Harvard
Art McManus^{10}	Guard	Boston College
Charlie Morrison	End^{11}	none
Bill Murphy	End^{11}	Boston University
Tom O'Brien	Tackle	Boston College
Ray Paten	Guard	Boston College
Al Pierotti	Center	Washington & Lee
Art Ray	Guard	Holy Cross
Francis Smith	Center^{1}	Holy Cross
Bill Stephens	Tackle^{12}	Bucknell
Zeke “Pete” Surabran	Tackle	Williams
Herb Treat	Tackle	Boston College, Princeton
Jim Wallis	Back^{2}	Holy Cross

^{1} Also played end
^{2} Played wingback, fullback, and blocking back
^{3} Finished season with the Providence Steam Roller
^{4} Played blocking back and wingback
^{5} Also played wingback
^{6} Also playing fullback and end
^{7} Played for the Frankford Yellow Jackets of the NFL after the folding of the Bulldogs
^{8} Started season with the Providence Steam Roller
^{9} Position later known as quarterback
^{10} Started season with the Newark Bears
^{11} Also played guard
^{12} Also played guard and center
