= Charles Coppen =

American journalist

Charles B. Coppen was an American journalist who was the sports editor for the Providence Journal. He was also a baseball executive and a part owner of the Providence Steam Roller of the National Football League. He not only shared ownership of the team with Peter Laudati and James Dooley, but was also a co-founder of the team with Pearce Johnson, the team's general manager. In addition to his duties to the Steam Roller, he also had a budding law practice. His career with the Providence Journal ended with his involvement with the Steam Roller and in managing boxers. Coppen was also the manager of Providence's stadium, the Cyclodome.

It was also Coppen who named the Steam Roller. During halftime against a game between a team from East Boston and his Providence Professionals, Coppen who was getting a hot dog, heard a remark that the opposing team was "getting steam-rolled". Coppen loved the remark so much changed the name to the Steam Roller.

== Colonial League ==
In 1914, Coppen was elected president of the Colonial League, a newly formed minor league. By May, it was suspected that Alexander Bannwart, who aided in the business management of the league, was working as an agent of the Federal League, an outlaw league working outside of the National Agreement. Bannwart denied this. Upon these news reports, some of the founding members of the Colonial League resigned, fearing banishment by the National Baseball Commission.

At the April 1915 league meeting, Coppen was re-elected as president and Bannwart was elected secretary. Walter S. Ward, the treasurer of the Brooklyn Tip Tops of the Federal League and son of George S. Ward, an owner of the Tip Tops, was elected as the league's treasurer. Wanting to expand into Springfield, Massachusetts, and Hartford and New Haven, Connecticut, territory that belonged to the Eastern Association, the Colonial League reorganized itself as a farm system for the Federal League and voluntarily withdrew itself from organized baseball. The Colonial League struggled financially in 1915, and Bannwart's policies were blamed. In August 1915, Bannwart resigned from the Colonial League. The league collapsed during the 1915-16 offseason.
