= Kinsley Park =

Defunct sports venue in Rhode Island, USA

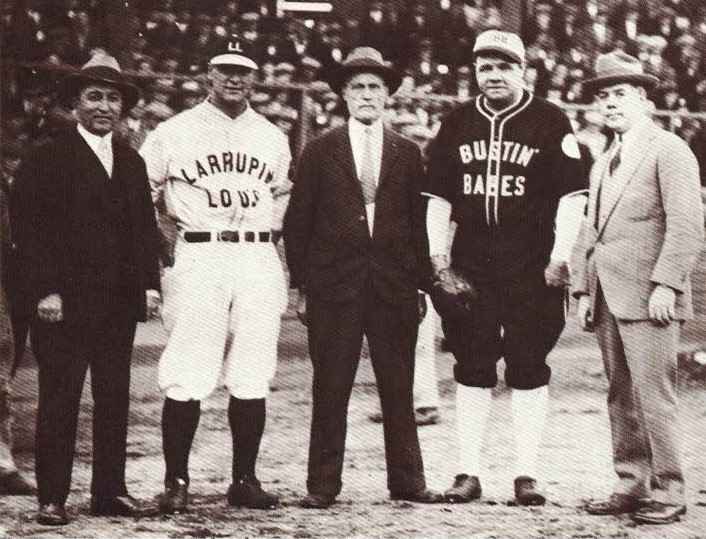
L to R: Peter Laudati, Lou Gehrig, Tim O’Neil, Babe Ruth, and James Dooley at Kinsley Park, October 10, 1927

Kinsley Park was an athletic field, used for professional football, minor league baseball and pro soccer, located in Providence, Rhode Island at the corner of Kinsley Avenue (north, third base) and Acorn Street (west, first base), across Acorn from the Nicholson File Company Mill Complex. The field was used primarily by Providence Steam Roller, Providence Grays and the Providence Gold Bugs. The park was built primarily by Peter Laudati, a prominent Providence real estate developer and a part-owner of the Providence Steam Roller. He also built the Steam Roller's second stadium, the Cycledrome.

== Baseball ==
The first professional baseball game at Kinsley Park was a racially integrated game in 1921. The Cleveland Colored Giants, a team made up of black players, played the Providence Independents, a team made up of white players.

In October 1927, Babe Ruth and Lou Gehrig played an exhibition game at the park during their North American post-season barnstorming tour.

== Football ==
The field is best known for hosting the first night game in NFL history on November 6, 1929, between the Steam Roller and the Chicago Cardinals. The game ended in a 16-0 Cardinals victory behind the running, passing and kicking of Ernie Nevers, who scored all of the games 16 points. He rushed 23 times for 102 yards and a touchdown. He also completed 10 of 15 passes for 144 yards and another touchdown. He also kicked a 33-yard field goal and an extra point.

The game was scheduled for Sunday November 3, however heavy rains made the Cyclodome unplayable. Rather than lose a contest with a high probability for a nice payday, the historic night game was hastily scheduled.

The game was considered a success because at least 6,000 spectators attended. According to newspaper accounts, the ball had been painted white so that it would be easier to see. The floodlights were also described as being just as good as daylight for the players. The Providence Journal, at the time, described the system as “33 giant projectors on poles 53 feet high, and nine poles on top of the grandstand.” Floodlights were then installed the next year at the Cyclodome and other NFL teams began playing at night as well. According to his 1930 contract with the Providence Steam Roller, which is now in the Pro Football Hall of Fame archives, Tony Latone was paid $125 for all NFL daylight games and 60 percent of that sum for NFL "floodlight" games. One of the original team's founders Pearce Johnson explained that the pay reduction for night games was arranged to help pay the installation costs of the floodlights at the Cyclodome.

== Soccer ==
On October 6, 1929, the American Soccer League had suspended operations on October 9, pending a merger with the rival Eastern League of Professional Soccer. Hoping to regenerate fan interest during the situation, the Gold Bugs had cobbled together an exhibition schedule. The team then began playing under the new lights at Kinsley Park. On October 31, 1929, the Gold Bugs defeated the Boston Soccer Club, 2–1.

Kinsley Park was closed by the end of 1931. It was torn down in 1933 and no trace of the field remains.

Preceded by Initial	Primary Providence Steam Roller venues 1916–1924	Succeeded by Cyclodome
