= Tony Latone =

American football player (1897–1975)

Profile
- Position: Running back

Personal information
- Born: April 18, 1897; Springfield, Illinois, U.S.
- Died: November 24, 1975 (aged 78); Detroit, Michigan, U.S.

Career information
- College: None

Career history
- 1925–1928: Pottsville Maroons
- 1929: Boston Bulldogs
- 1930: Providence Steam Roller

Awards and highlights
- Disputed NFL champion (1925)

Anthony H. Latone (April 18, 1897 – November 24, 1975) was an American football player of Lithuanian descent who played six seasons in the National Football League (NFL). Although he never attended college, he is unofficially considered the leading rusher of 1920s. During the six seasons he played in the NFL, Latone out-rushed (2,648–2,616 in yards) and outscored (26–21 in touchdowns) the Pro Football Hall of Fame's Red Grange, despite playing 30 fewer games. He was also one of the very few known persons to knock Grange out of a game. Grange later said that, "even though (Chicago Bears owner) George Halas was paying me, 500 bucks to barn storm the nation, it wasn't enough to be hit by the likes of Latone."

== Playing career ==
At age 11, after his father's death, he worked in his place in the Pennsylvania coal mines to support his mother and 5 other siblings. By working as a slaypicker in the mines, Tony developed his legs by pushing mining carts up a slope.

Latone played for the Pottsville Maroons historic 1925 team. Latone and the Maroons won the 1925 NFL Championship, before the title was stripped from the team due to a still-disputed rules violation. That season, Tony contributed eight touchdowns in which Pottsville attack led the league with 270 points. He also followed the Maroons to Boston in 1929, where they became the Boston Bulldogs in 1929.

According to his 1930 contract with the Providence Steam Roller, which is now in the Pro Football Hall of Fame archives, Latone was paid $125 for all NFL daylight games and 60 percent of that sum for NFL "floodlight" games. One of the original team's founders Pearce Johnson explained that the pay reduction for night games was arranged to help pay the installation costs of the floodlights at the Cyclodome.

Following his playing career, Latone moved to Michigan and went into business with former Maroon teammate Frank Bucher. For many years, he'd sit in the stands at Detroit's Briggs Stadium, watching the Detroit Lions play.

In 2021, the Professional Football Researchers Association named Latone to the PFRA Hall of Very Good Class of 2021.

== Money ==
Due to having support his family at an early age, Tony only had a fifth-grade education. According to one story, Tony was always paid in cash, a common occurrence for other players of the day. One day, several Maroons players found some money on the bench that belonged to Tony. They asked him, "What are you doing, Tony? Why don't you get yourself a checking account?" Tony didn't understand how a checking account worked and didn't want to get one. But because the other players kept bugging him about it, he eventually gave in and got one. However a week later, the same players found his checkbook lying on the bench, with every check in the book was signed. He'd typically walk into a business and ask the clerk, "What do I owe you?" He would then proceed to fill in the amount on the check because his name was already on it.
