= Bill Cronin =

Bill Cronin may refer to:

- Bill Cronin (baseball) (1902–1966), American baseball player and manager
- Bill Cronin (American football coach), American football coach
- Bill Cronin (fullback) (1901–1956), American football player
- Bill Cronin (tight end) (1943–1991), American football player
