= First Hingham High School =

Hingham High School
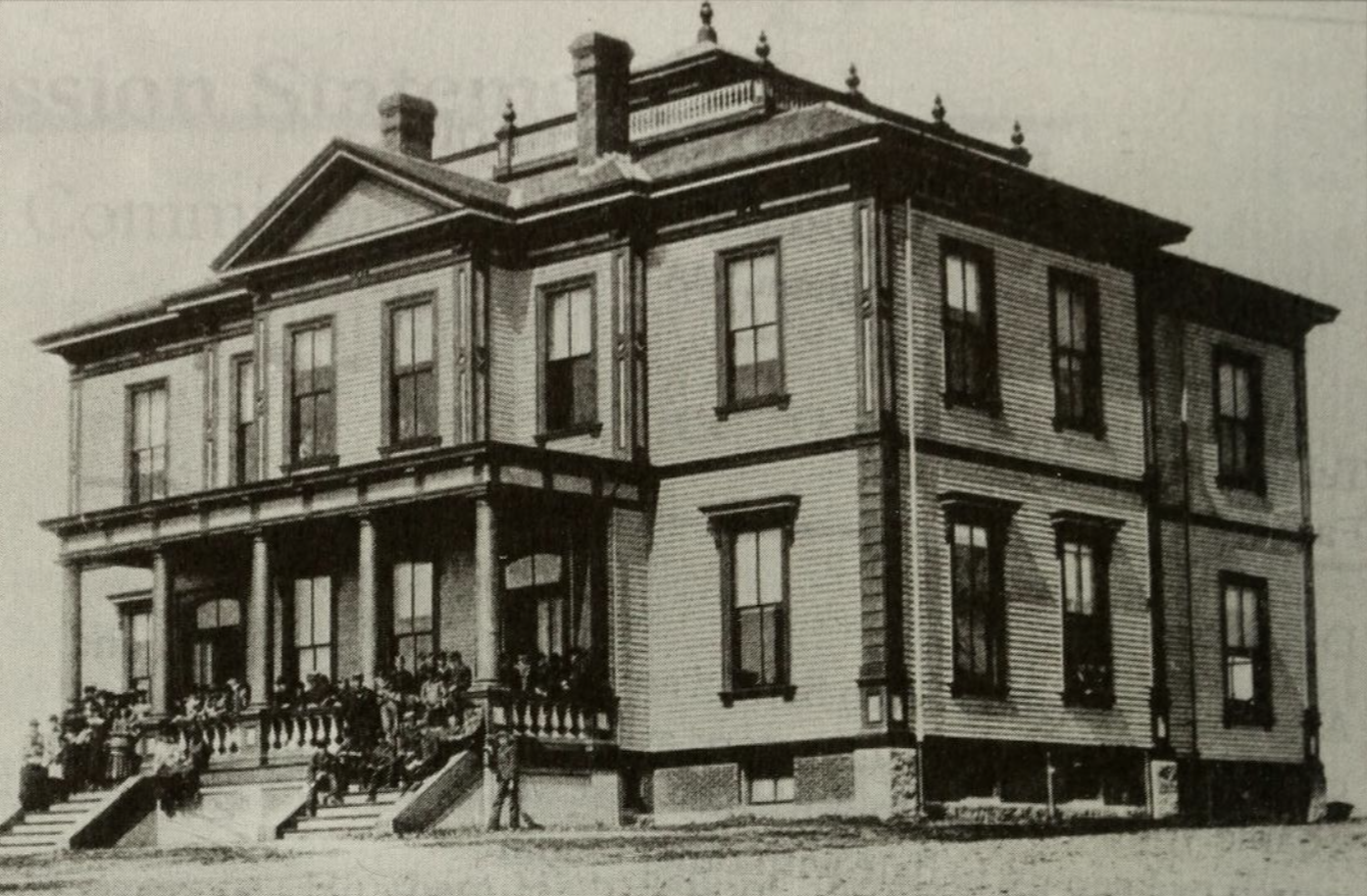
- The school photographed in 1885
- Interactive map of the Hingham High School area

General information
- Coordinates: 42.2294°N 70.885°W
- Opened: 1872
- Renovated: Winter 1902-1903
- Destroyed: 1927
- Cost: $19,956.63

The first Hingham High School was constructed in 1872 in Hingham, Massachusetts and stood for 55 years before it was destroyed in a fire.

== Construction ==
The school was built on Central Street at what is called "Cold Corner" or "Cole Corner" in Hingham. The true name of the area has been debated since the 1800s, with existing maps using both names. Before its construction, Derby Academy served as the school for older students. $20,000 was allotted for the construction of the school, and $19,956.63 was spent. $43.37 was returned to the town treasurer. An itemized breakdown shows the costs of each component.

- Land: $950.20
- Materials and construction: $15,788.80
- Furniture and fittings: $1,412.59
- Grading grounds: $263.13
- Fencing: $389.31
- Well fixtures: $256.87
- Cementing cellar: $242.27
- Printing and advertising: $23.25
- Committee expenses: $121.00
- Miscellaneous: $499.21

The building was completed in early March 1872. The bottom floor contained a large room which could fit 90 students, two classrooms, two side rooms, and offices. The hallways were wide and well lit. The second floor had a large hall built to fit 400, along with more classrooms. The school was dedicated in the afternoon of May 1, 1872. A dedicatory address was given by local politician John D. Long, who would later become the Governor of Massachusetts and United States Secretary of the Navy.

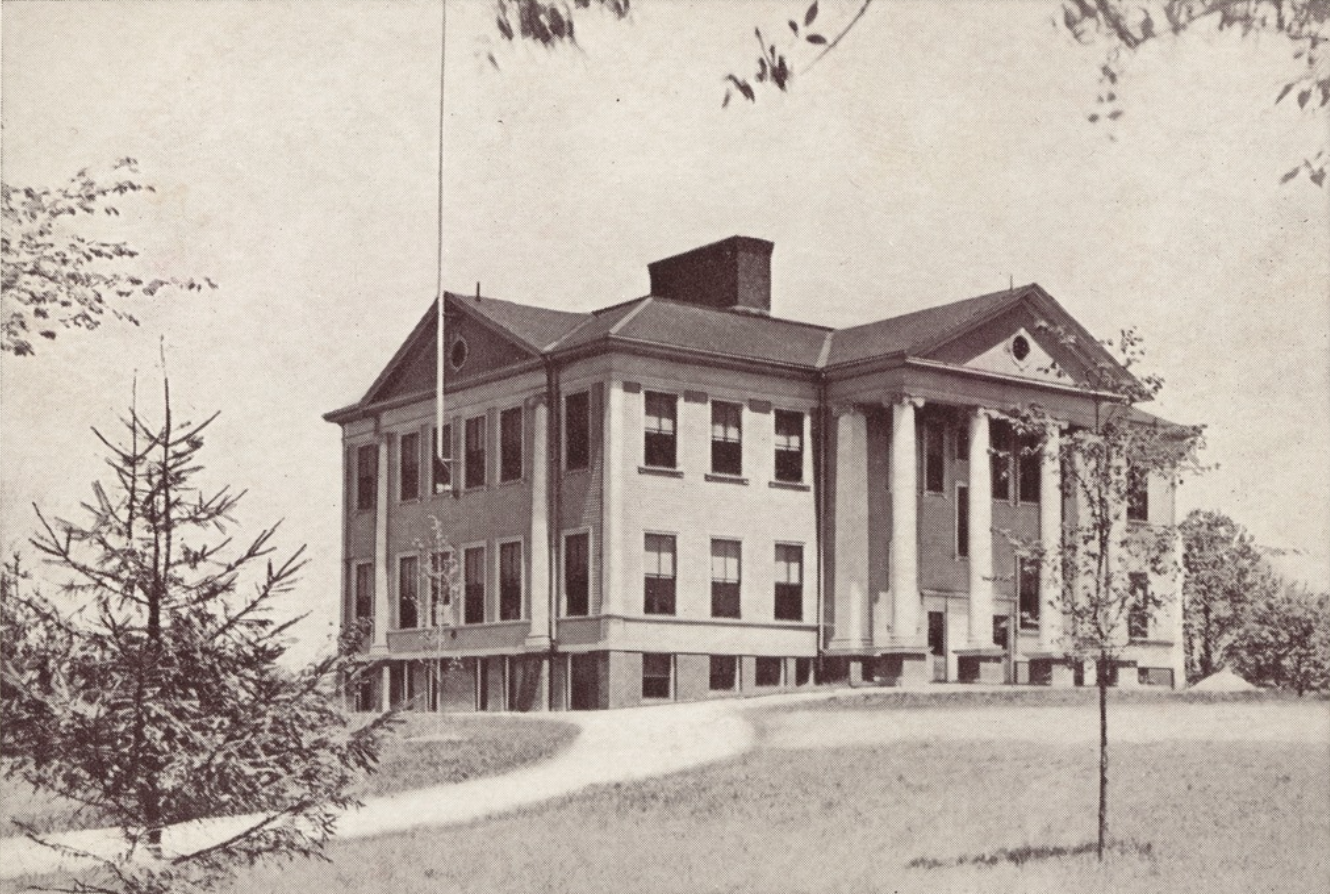
The school viewed from Central Street after its 1902-1903 renovation

The building was remodeled starting in the fall of 1902, adding four new rooms. The work was done during a harsh winter in 1902-1903 and completed in February.

== Daily life ==
The first class at the new school was made up of 47 students, 40 from Hingham, five from Scituate, and two from Marshfield. The first graduating class was made up of eight students. There were two teachers, Jacob O Sandborn and Ella Corthell, and hours were one session from 9:00 am to 2:00 pm. Subjects taught in the first year included geometry, arithmetic, natural history, analysis, penmanship, Latin, Greek, French, and Virgil.

The first superintendent was also appointed at this time. The job was done by two men, John Snyder and Allen G. Jennings, although Snyder left soon after his appointment. The new school and appointment of a superintendent greatly strengthened education in the town.

== Notable alumni ==
- Bill Cronin: Fullback and 1928 NFL champion with the Providence Steam Roller
- Charles Murphy: 1929 All American defensive end and baseball player at Boston College

== Fire ==
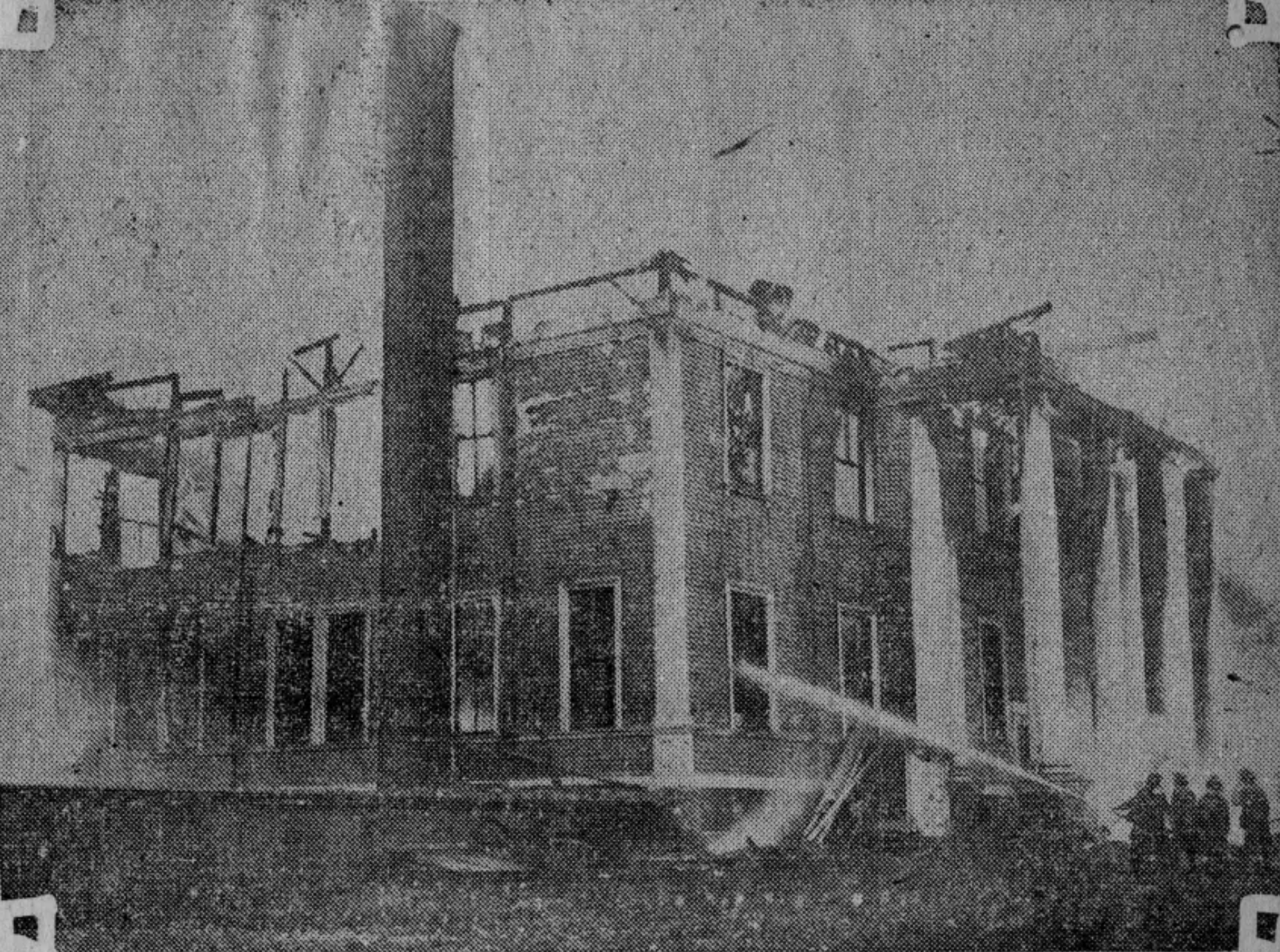
Firefighters putting out fires in the ruins of the school

At 4:00 am on October 19, 1927, residents near the school were awoken by an explosion and saw the school in flames. The fire department was alerted, but by 5:00 am it was deemed the structure would be a total loss. After investigation, firefighters said the blaze started in the basement and worked its way up through the building. The explosion was caused by a buildup of heat beneath the slate roof in the attic. In the early stages of the fire, records were removed from the building and when it had died down football equipment was salvaged. Nobody was seriously injured. The building and its furnishings were insured for $60,000 all together, but the loss was tallied at $75,000. In the weeks that followed, poems about the school appeared in the local paper, The Hingham Journal. The 335 students enrolled at the school only missed three days of class before starting at the nearby Lincoln School, which was the junior high school. The school employed a morning session and afternoon session to accommodate all students.

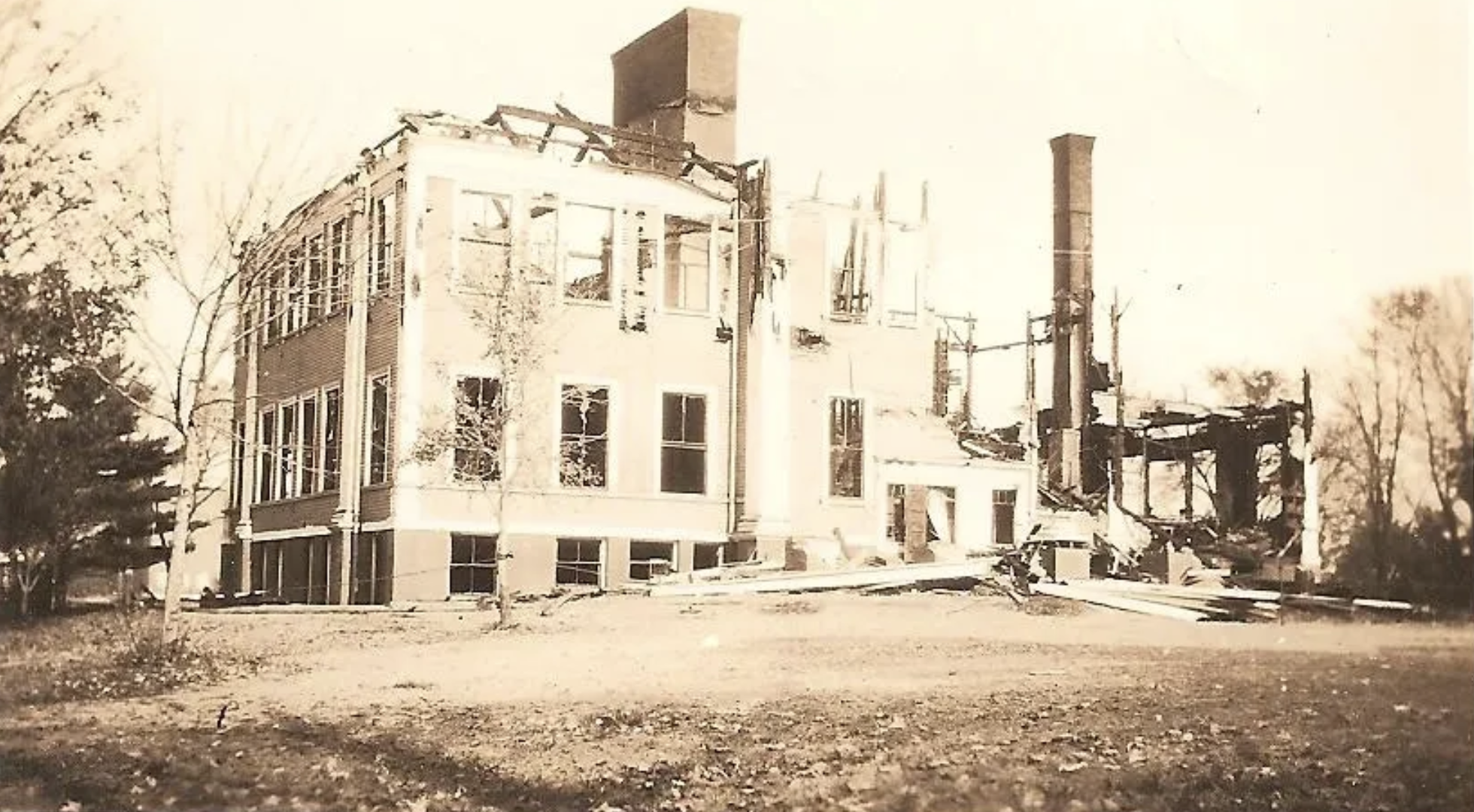
Ruins viewed from the rear of the building

After the fire, rumors about the cause circulated through the town, with some suspecting arson. Since the origin of the fire was on the opposite side of not near the heating equipment, the fire department investigated. After an investigation the fire chief said he believed cause was crossed electrical wires, and that there was no evidence of arson.

Today, residential homes sit on the location where the school used to stand, and the nearby Sandborn Road is named for Jacob Sandborn.
