= Peter Laudati =

American sports promoter (died 1977)

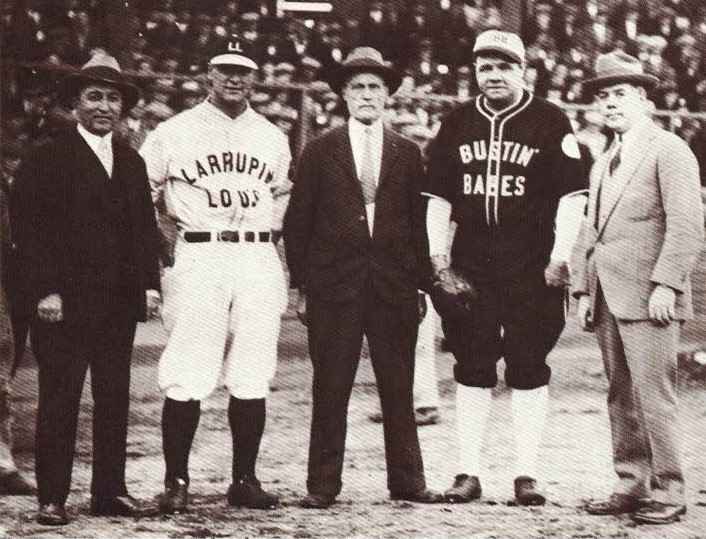
Laudati (far left) with Lou Gehrig, Tim O’Neil, Babe Ruth, James Dooley at Kinsley Park, October 1927

Peter A. Laudati was a sports promoter and a part-owner of the Providence Steam Roller of the National Football League. He was also responsible for the construction of the team's stadium, the Cycledrome. Prior to this, he was a prominent Providence real estate developer.

== Sports Promoter ==
Laudati was an ardent promoter of sports ventures; in addition to the Cycledrome he built Providence's Kinsley Park, home of the Providence Grays baseball team in the 1930s. He was instrumental in bringing Babe Ruth and Lou Gehrig to play an exhibition game at Kinsley Park during their 1927 post-season barnstorming tour.

=== Providence Steam Rollers ===
Laudati established the Steam Roller football team in 1916 with James Dooley and Charles Coppen. The Steam Roller became a member of the NFL in 1925. In 1928, they became the first team in New England to win an NFL Championship. According to a Steam Roller cash book, kept by Laudati in 1927, that was donated to the Pro Football Hall of Fame by Ray Monaco, who also played with the Washington Redskins and the Cleveland Rams, after a November 8 game against the New York Giants, brought a total intake of $9,911.51. Added to a $1,000 loan received from Laudati a day earlier, that gave the team a balance of nearly $11,000, more than enough to cover the game's expenses of $5,840.64. The NFL took 1 percent of the gate receipts from each game and the Cycledrome took 15 percent; players’ salaries ($1,972) and the visiting team's share ($2,475) accounted for most of the other expenses.

However, by 1931 financial issues forced the team to go on a hiatus and fold in 1933. Laudati turned this to his advantage. In 1934 he leveled the Cycledrome and built on the site an E.M. Lowe drive-in movie theater. When it opened in 1937, it was only the second drive-in theater in the nation, the first being in Jersey City. Although his name was not used in connection with the Cycledrome in any of the contemporary newspaper accounts, the chief financier and owner of the building was Laudati.

He died in September 1977.
