= University of Peabody =

The University of Peabody was a semi-professional American football team based in Peabody, Massachusetts. The team consisted mostly of former high school and college players and was run by local sports followers. It won the state semipro football championship in 1923 and 1924.

== History ==
In December 1922, the University of Peabody lost an exhibition game to New Hampshire State University at Donovan Field in Salem, Massachusetts. The following season, the University of Peabody was undefeated. In 1923, the team did not give up any touchdowns and only one field goal. The team matched this success the following season, winning all of its games and only getting scored on once. In 1925, the team lost three of its players; Stanley Burnham left to take a teaching/coaching position at the University of Pennsylvania, Karl Young enrolled at Boston College, and John Lawrence enrolled at Georgetown University. On November 29, 1915, the "University" lost to Pere Marquette of South Boston 12 to 7 in front of a crowd of 18,000 spectators at Leo Buckley Stadium, ending the team's winning streak. In 1926, the team struggled. In order to strengthen the roster, Al Pierotti of the Boston Bulldogs was added to the team late in the season. The "University" returned to form the following season. After finishing their schedule undefeated, the team faced off against Pere Marquette in a championship game at Braves Field. Pere Marquette won the game 19 to 0.

== Facilities ==
The University of Peabody played their games at Leo Buckley Stadium in Peabody, which was also the home stadium of Peabody High School. The University of Peabody played its games on Sunday. It was the only team North of Boston to play on Sundays, which allowed it to draw large crowds from all over Essex County, Massachusetts.

In 1924, the team practiced at the new General Electric Field in Lynn, Massachusetts. One of the first stadiums with lights, the University of Peabody was able to conduct outdoor practices during the evening. The team also held practices in the Peabody High School gymnasium.

== Roster ==
The University of Peabody's players included Stanley Burnham (Harvard), Oscar "Pike" Johnson (Vermont), John Leahy (Norwich), Billy Crean (Boston College), Buster Donahue (Providence Steam Roller/Boston College), Ben Batchelder (Haverhill High School), Joe Tansey, Karl Young, Hubby Lawrence, John Lawrence, Ray Trask, Joe Luz, Blaine Kehoe, Eddie O'Conner, Eddie Phelan, and Harry Miller.

The team was coached by Ed Brawley, who had played professional football for Jim Thorpe (Cleveland Tigers) and Charles Brickley (Brickley's Giants). The team manager was Bernard J. "Bernie" Nagle.

== Other sports ==
In addition to football, the University of Peabody also played basketball. Its home arena was the Endicott Street Hall in Peabody.
