= Jack Cronin (American football) =

American football player (1903–1993)

No. 5
- Position: Back

Personal information
- Born: May 3, 1903; Hingham, Massachusetts, U.S.
- Died: January 18, 1993 (aged 89); Jupiter, Florida, U.S.
- Listed height: 5 ft 11 in (1.80 m)
- Listed weight: 178 lb (81 kg)

Career information
- High school: Dean Academy (Franklin, Massachusetts)
- College: Boston College (1923–1926)

Career history
- Providence Steam Roller (1927–1930)

Awards and highlights
- NFL champion (1928)
- Stats at Pro Football Reference

John Patrick Cronin (May 3, 1903 – January 18, 1993) was an American professional football player who played four seasons with the Providence Steam Roller of the National Football League (NFL). He played college football at Boston College.

== Early life and college ==
John Patrick Cronin was born on May 3, 1903, in Hingham, Massachusetts. He attended Dean Academy in Franklin, Massachusetts.

He was a four-year letterman for the Boston College Eagles from 1923 to 1926.

== Professional career ==
Cronin signed with the Providence Steam Roller of the National Football League (NFL) in 1927. He played in 12 games, starting three, for the Steam Roller during his rookie season in 1927, scoring one punt return touchdown. He appeared in eight games, starting five, in 1928, recording three rushing touchdowns. The team finished the 1928 season with a 8–1–2 record and were named NFL champions. Cronin played in all 12 games, starting five, in 1929, and scored one rushing touchdown. The Steam Roller had a 4–6–2 record that season. Cronin appeared in all ten games, starting three, for the team in 1930 but did not record any touchdowns that season. The Steam Roller finished the year with a 6–4–1 record.

== Personal life ==
Cronin's brother Bill and nephew Bill also played football. Jack died on January 18, 1993, in Jupiter, Florida.
