= Shutout =

Game in which one team does not score

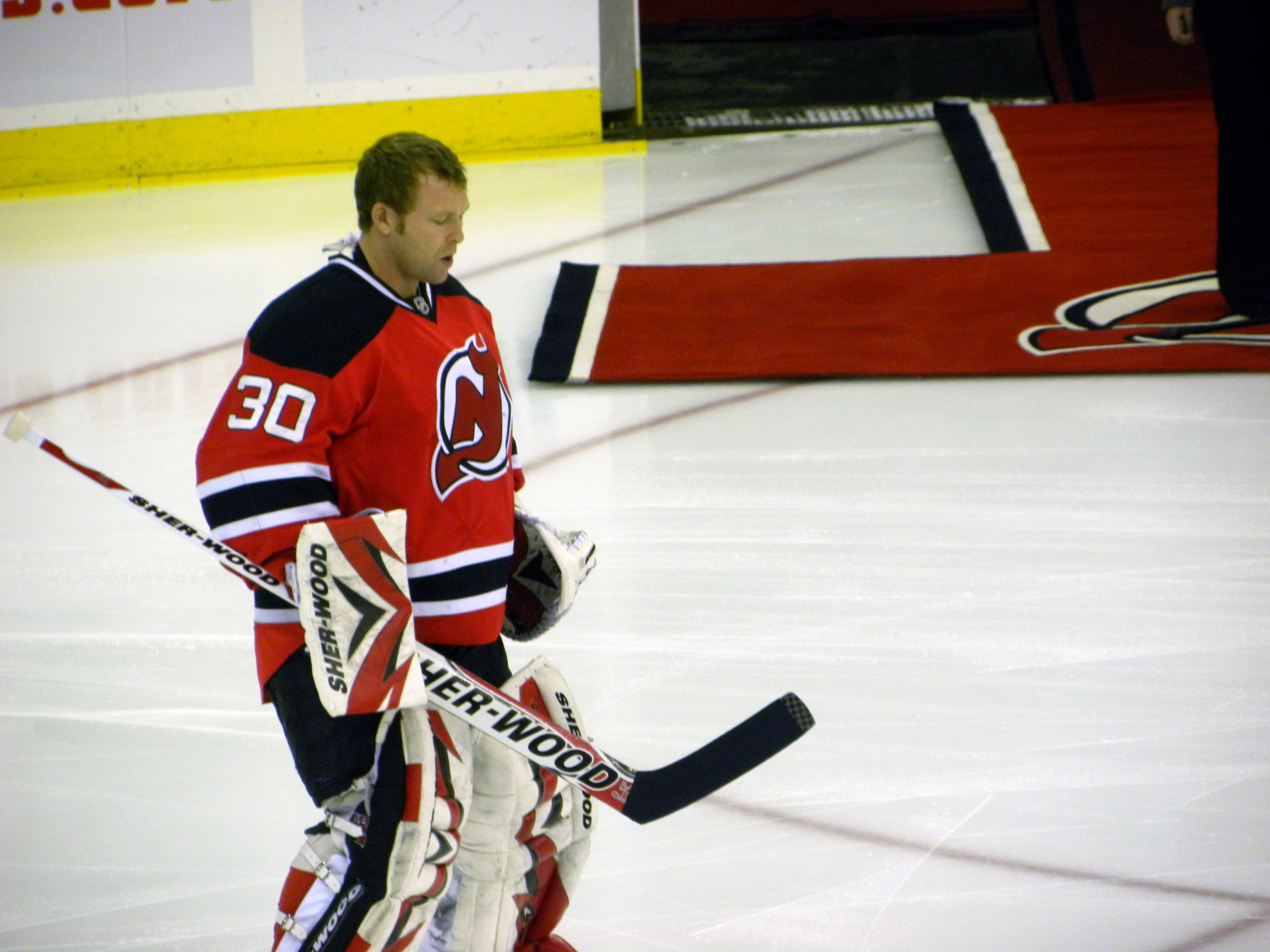
Goaltender Martin Brodeur holds several individual National Hockey League records for shutouts.

In team sports, a shutout (U.S.) or clean sheet (UK) is a game in which an opposing team fails to score. While possible in most major sports, they are highly improbable in some sports, such as basketball. Shutouts are usually seen as a result of effective defensive play even though a weak opposing offense may also be responsible. Some sports credit individual players, particularly goalkeepers and starting pitchers, with shutouts and keep track of them as statistics; others do not.

== American football ==
Shutouts in American football are uncommon. Keeping an opponent scoreless in American football requires a team's defense to be able to consistently shut down both pass and run offenses over the course of a game. The difficulty of completing a shutout is compounded by the many ways a team can score in the game. For example, teams can attempt field goals, which have a high rate of success. The range of NFL caliber kickers makes it possible for a team with a weak offense to get close enough to the goalposts (within "field goal range") to kick a field goal. Of 2,544 regular season NFL games from 2000 to 2009, 89 (3.5%) were shutouts.

There are at least five instances in American football in which a team had been shut out throughout an entire season, and four in which a team has shut out all of their opponents in the season (the longest of these being the ten-game perfect season in which the 1933 Providence Huskies did not concede a single point).

In college football, the Tennessee Volunteers hold the record for most consecutive shutout wins with 17. The streak started against Tennessee-Chattanooga on November 30, 1938 and ended with a 27–12 loss against Alabama on October 19, 1940.

The achievement of a shutout is much more difficult in Canadian football, where scoring and offensive movement is generally more frequent and a single point can be scored by kicking the ball into the end zone such that the other team does not, or cannot, return it or kick it out of the end zone.

== Association football ==
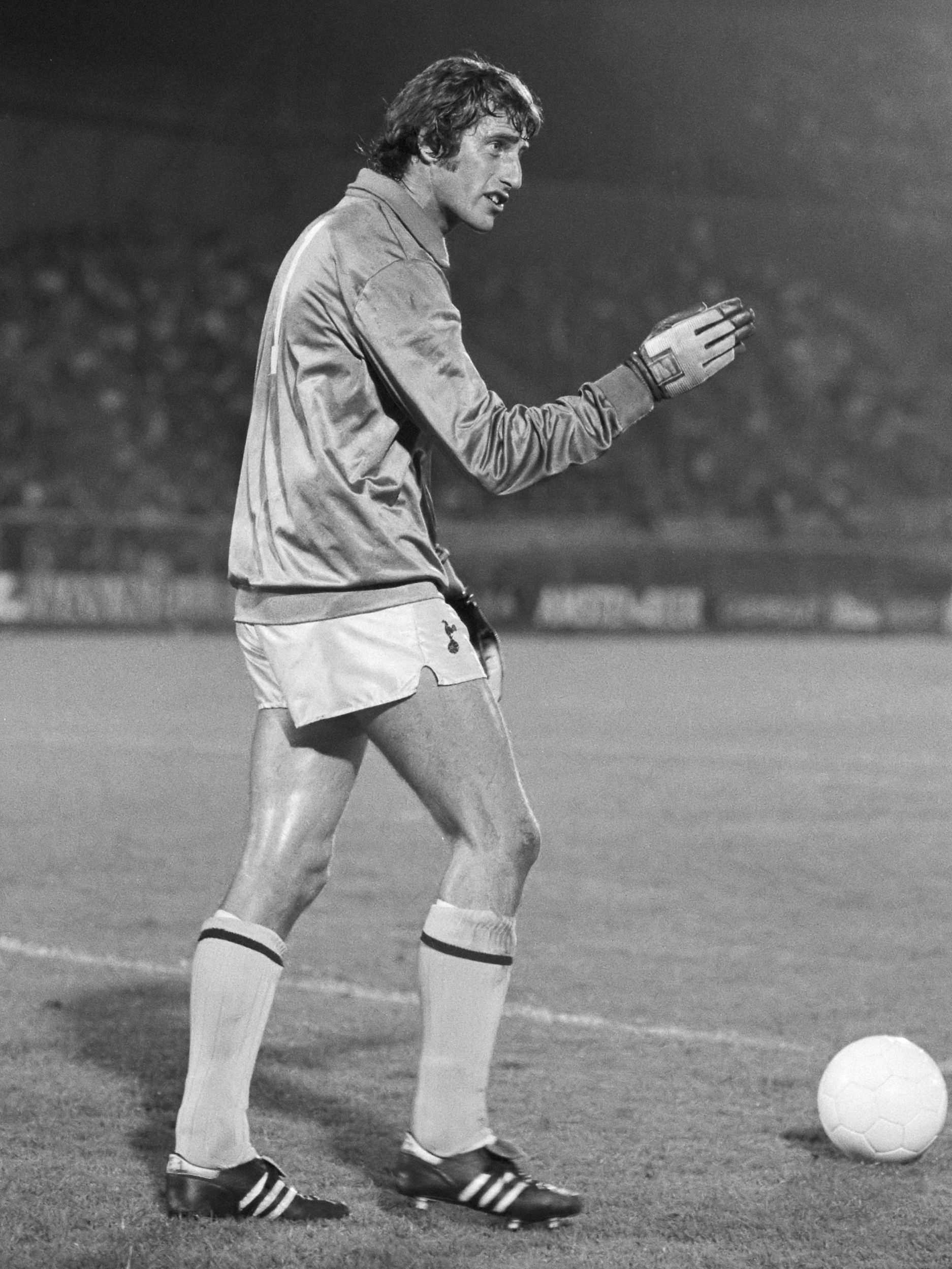
Goalkeeper Ray Clemence recorded 537 "clean sheets" during his career.

In association football and other sports with a goalkeeper, the goalkeeper may be said to "keep a clean sheet" if they prevent their opponents from scoring during an entire match. Because football is a relatively low-scoring game, it is common for one team, or even both teams, to score no goals. A theory as to the term's origin is that sports reporters used separate pieces of paper to record the different statistical details of a game. If one team did not allow a goal, then that team's "details of goals conceded" page would appear blank, leaving a clean sheet. If a game ends with a final score of 0–0, both sides are considered to have kept a clean sheet.

== Baseball ==
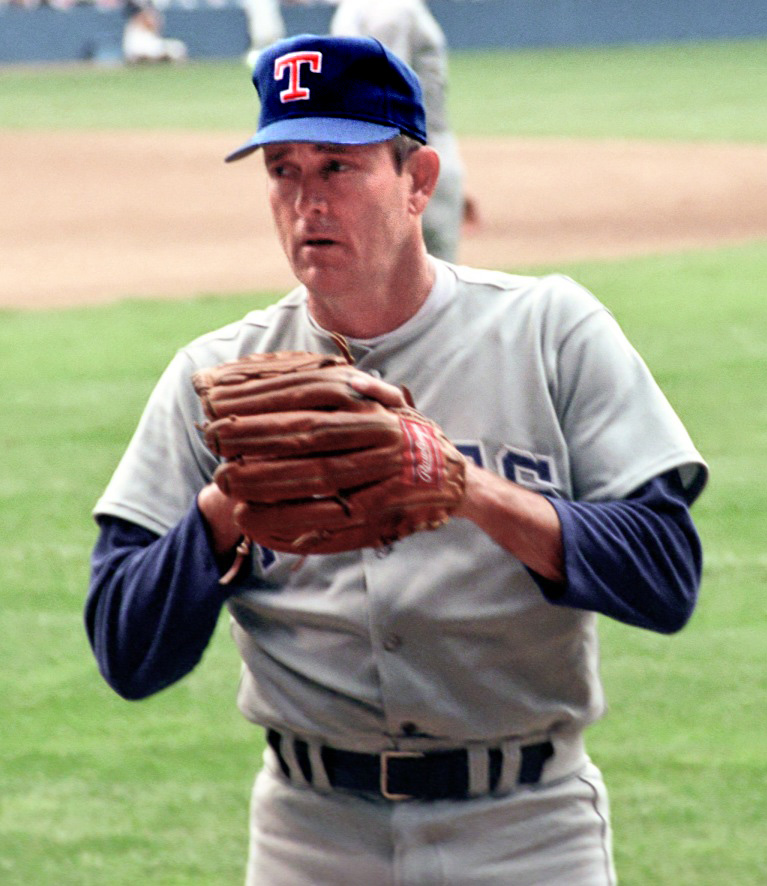
Nolan Ryan recorded 61 shutouts during his career as a major-league pitcher.

In Major League Baseball, a shutout (denoted statistically as ShO or SHO) refers to the act by which a single pitcher pitches a complete game and does not allow the opposing team to score a run. If two or more pitchers combine to complete this act, no pitcher will be awarded a shutout, although the team itself can be said to have "shut out" the opposing team. The only exception to this is when a pitcher enters a game before the opposing team scores a run or makes an out and then completes the game without allowing a run to score. That pitcher is then awarded a shutout, although not a complete game.

The all-time career leader in shutouts is Walter Johnson, who pitched for the Washington Senators from 1907 to 1927. He accumulated 110 shutouts, which is 20 more than second placed Grover Cleveland Alexander. The most shutouts recorded in one season was 16, which was a feat accomplished by both Grover Alexander (1916) and George Bradley (1876). These records are considered among the most secure records in baseball, as pitchers today rarely earn more than one or two shutouts per season with a heavy emphasis on pitch count and relief pitching. Complete games themselves have also become rare among starting pitchers. As of 2021, the current active leader in shutouts is Clayton Kershaw of the Los Angeles Dodgers, whose 15 shutouts ties him for 463rd all time. Only four pitchers whose entire careers were in the post-1920 live-ball era threw as many as 60 career shutouts, with Warren Spahn leading those pitchers with 63.

== Ice hockey ==
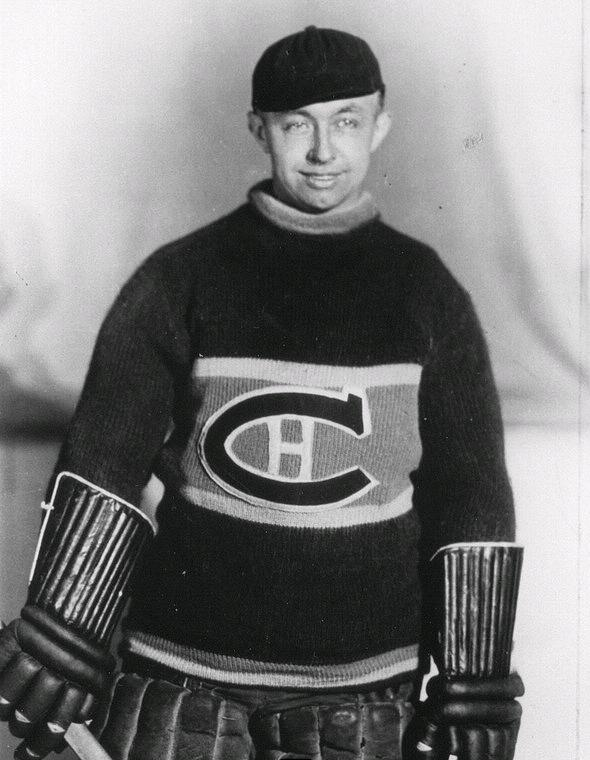
Goaltender George Hainsworth recorded 22 shutouts during the 1928–29 NHL season.

In ice hockey, a shutout (SO) is credited to a goaltender who successfully stops the other team from scoring during the entire game. In regular season games, if the score is 0–0 with the game going to a penalty shootout, both goaltenders are credited with a shutout. The record holder for most regular-season career shutouts in the National Hockey League (NHL) is Martin Brodeur with 125 (see the all-time regular season shutout leaders). For a single NHL season, the most shutouts recorded by a goaltender is 22, by George Hainsworth during the 1928–29 season. The modern-day record for a team being shut out in a season is held by the Columbus Blue Jackets at 16, during the 2006–07 season.

In the event that a shutout is accomplished by a team using more than one goaltender in the game, the shutout is credited to the team, and no goaltender is awarded a shutout. This has happened several times in NHL history:

- On April 3, 1983, the Washington Capitals won 3–0 against the New York Rangers with Al Jensen in goals for the first two periods and Pat Riggin for the last period.
- On November 23, 2006, the Nashville Predators won 6–0 against the Vancouver Canucks with goaltender Tomáš Vokoun being replaced at the start of the third period by Chris Mason due to injury.
- On December 1, 2009, the Toronto Maple Leafs won 3–0 against the Montreal Canadiens. Jonas Gustavsson started in goal but was replaced after the first period by Joey MacDonald because of a cardiac problem.
- On March 26, 2013, the Pittsburgh Penguins won 1–0 against the Montreal Canadiens with Marc-André Fleury starting the game and being replaced because of injury by Tomáš Vokoun for the third period.
- On December 3, 2021, the New York Rangers won 1–0 against the San Jose Sharks after Igor Shesterkin was injured and replaced by Alexandar Georgiev in the third period.
- On March 19, 2023, the St. Louis Blues won 3–0 against the Winnipeg Jets after Joel Hofer had an equipment malfunction and was replaced by Thomas Greiss for 2:36 in the 2nd period. Hofer then returned after fixing his equipment.
- On March 10, 2024, the Edmonton Oilers won 4–0 against the Pittsburgh Penguins after Calvin Pickard was replaced with Stuart Skinner for the last 1:16 of the second period and did not face a shot. Pickard then returned for the third period.

== Rugby ==
Clean sheets are not common in either rugby union or league, since it is relatively simple to score a penalty kick. The 2005 Gillette Rugby League Tri-Nations final was the first time that Australia had been "nilled" since 1981. There is no alternative term for the occurrence of a team failing to score, except to say that the team scored "nil" (or "zero" or "nothing" in North America). For example, the December 2006 Celtic League match between Munster and Connacht ended 13–0 to Munster; it was, therefore, said that Munster won "thirteen–nil."

Recent examples of clean sheets in international rugby union include England vs Scotland in 2014, France vs Italy in 2015, France vs Argentina in 2016, Scotland vs Italy in 2017, New Zealand vs South Africa in 2017, New Zealand vs Australia in 2019, and Wales vs Italy in 2020.

Generally, a team that is well-disciplined defensively, as well as behaviorally (not giving away penalty kicks), is most likely to not concede scores. This may also occur if there is a significant difference in class between the two teams, for example, when Scotland beat Spain (who were playing in their only Rugby World Cup) 48–0 in the 1999 Rugby World Cup, or when Australia beat Namibia 142–0 in the 2003 Rugby World Cup.

== See also ==
- Whitewash (sport)
