= Jack Donahue (American football) =

American football player and coach (1904–1984)

Profile
- Position: Guard/Tackle

Personal information
- Born: December 30, 1904; Peabody, Massachusetts
- Died: November 10, 1984 (aged 79); Quincy, Massachusetts
- Listed height: 6 ft 2 in (1.88 m)
- Listed weight: 230 lb (104 kg)

Career information
- High school: Peabody (MA)
- College: Boston College

Career history
- Providence Steam Roller (1926)
- Stats at Pro Football Reference

John J. Donahue (December 30, 1904 – November 10, 1984) was an American football player and coach.

== Playing career ==
Donahue played guard on the Peabody High School football team. He played guard and tackle for Boston College from 1922 to 1925 and was captain his senior year. On August 9, 1926, he signed with the Providence Steam Roller. He played in 13 games (9 starts) for the team at left guard. Donahue later played semi-pro football for the University of Peabody and Pere Marquette.

In addition to playing football, Donahue was also a member of the Boston College Eagles baseball team and a boxer.

== Coaching career ==
In 1928, Donahue joined the faculty of East Bridgewater High School as head football coach and history teacher. In 1932 he became the first ever football coach at North Quincy High School. He continued to coach the team until his resignation in 1960. He compiled a 128-95-20 record with the school. Donahue also served as NQHS' golf coach and guided the team to a state championship in 1948. He retired from teaching in 1971.

== Death ==
Donahue died on November 10, 1984, at Quincy City Hospital following a long illness. He was buried in Mount Wollaston Cemetery
