= Hingham Town Hall =

Building in Hingham, Massachusetts, United States

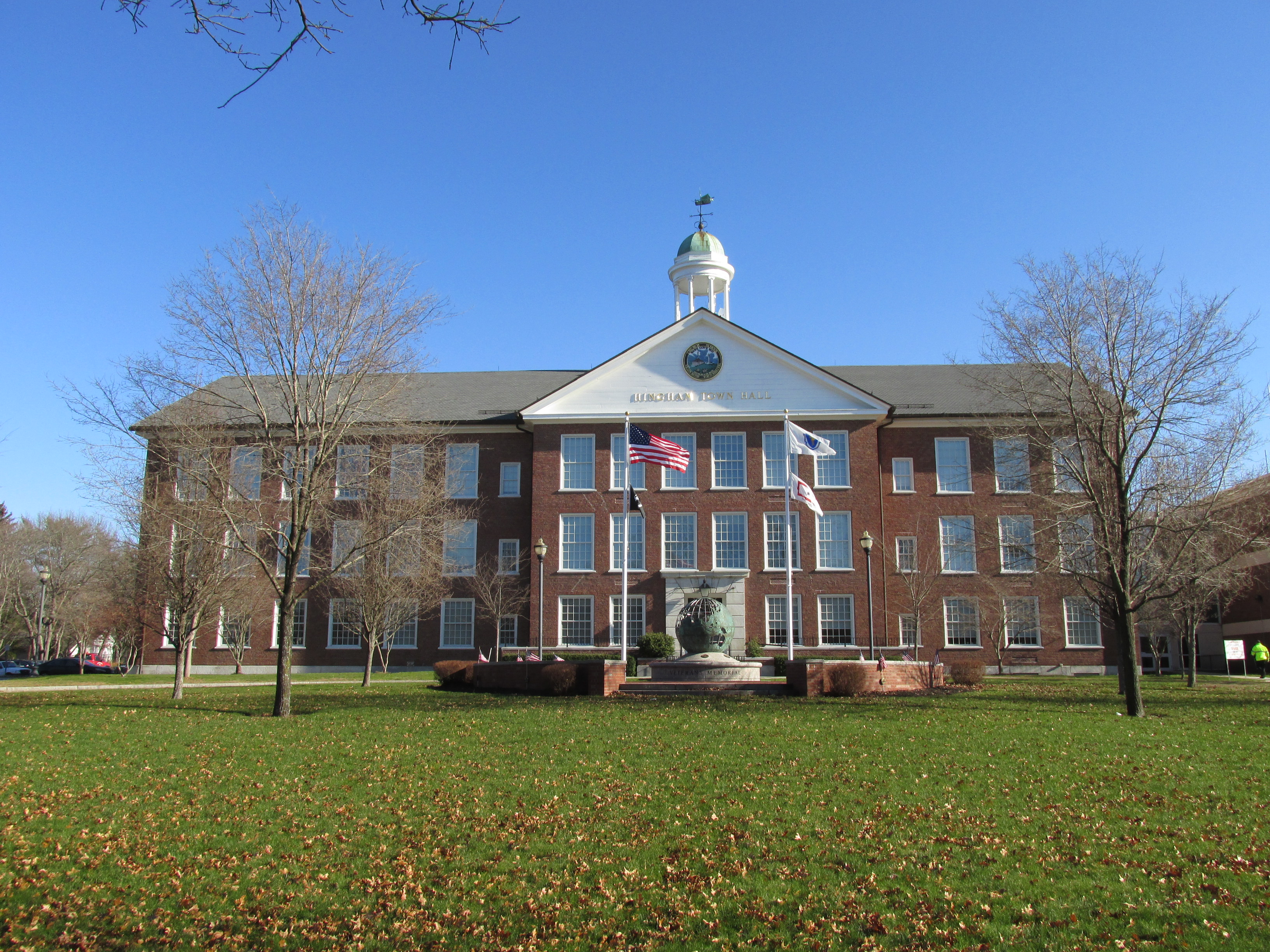
- Interactive map of Hingham Town Hall
- Former names: Hingham High School (1928–1954); Central Junior High School (1954–1989); Hingham Town Hall (1995–Present)
- Address: 210 Central St; Hingham, MA, 02043
- Location: Hingham, Massachusetts
- Coordinates: 42.2315°N 70.886°W

Construction
- Opened: 1928
- Cost: $401,500
- Architectural style: Colonial
- Architects: Derby & Robinson

The Hingham Town Hall is a building in Hingham, Massachusetts which has served as the high school, middle school, and town hall.

== Hingham High School ==
The Hingham Town Hall was built in 1928 as the second Hingham High School. The first Hingham High School burned down in 1927, during the construction of the new school. It cost $401,500 to build, an amount which the townspeople believed to be too high at the time. The site it was built on was formerly the location of the Hingham Cordage Company.

When the school was opened to the public in September of 1928 it was admired for its completeness, both inside and out. It featured four floors and a basement. The basement contained the gymnasium, heating equipment, water equipment and coal storage. The first floor held a main entrance perpendicular to the main hallway which gave access to sewing, manual training, and lunch rooms. The second floor had classrooms, a study, a library, entrances to the auditorium, and the offices of the principal and superintendent. The library and study were joined by a large folding door, allowing them to become one large room. The auditorium could sit 600 with seats on the floor and in a balcony, and served as a place for people in the town to hold lectures, musicals, and plays. The third floor contained the physics and chemistry departments, entrances to the balcony in the auditorium, and an entrance to the auditorium's projector room. Finally the fourth floor contained quarters for the teachers and other school employees.

The school offered sports to both boys and girls. By 1954, when the school moved locations, available boys sports included football, basketball, track, baseball, tennis, and ice hockey. Girls sports included field hockey, basketball, tennis, softball, and cheer.

Facilities for these sports were located in the space behind the school. A baseball field, a football field surrounded by a quarter mile track, and tennis courts served their respective teams, while the gymnasium was used by the basketball team and for physical education classes.

As enrollment in the school increased the building became crowded, prompting the construction of a new high school in 1954 which is still in use today.

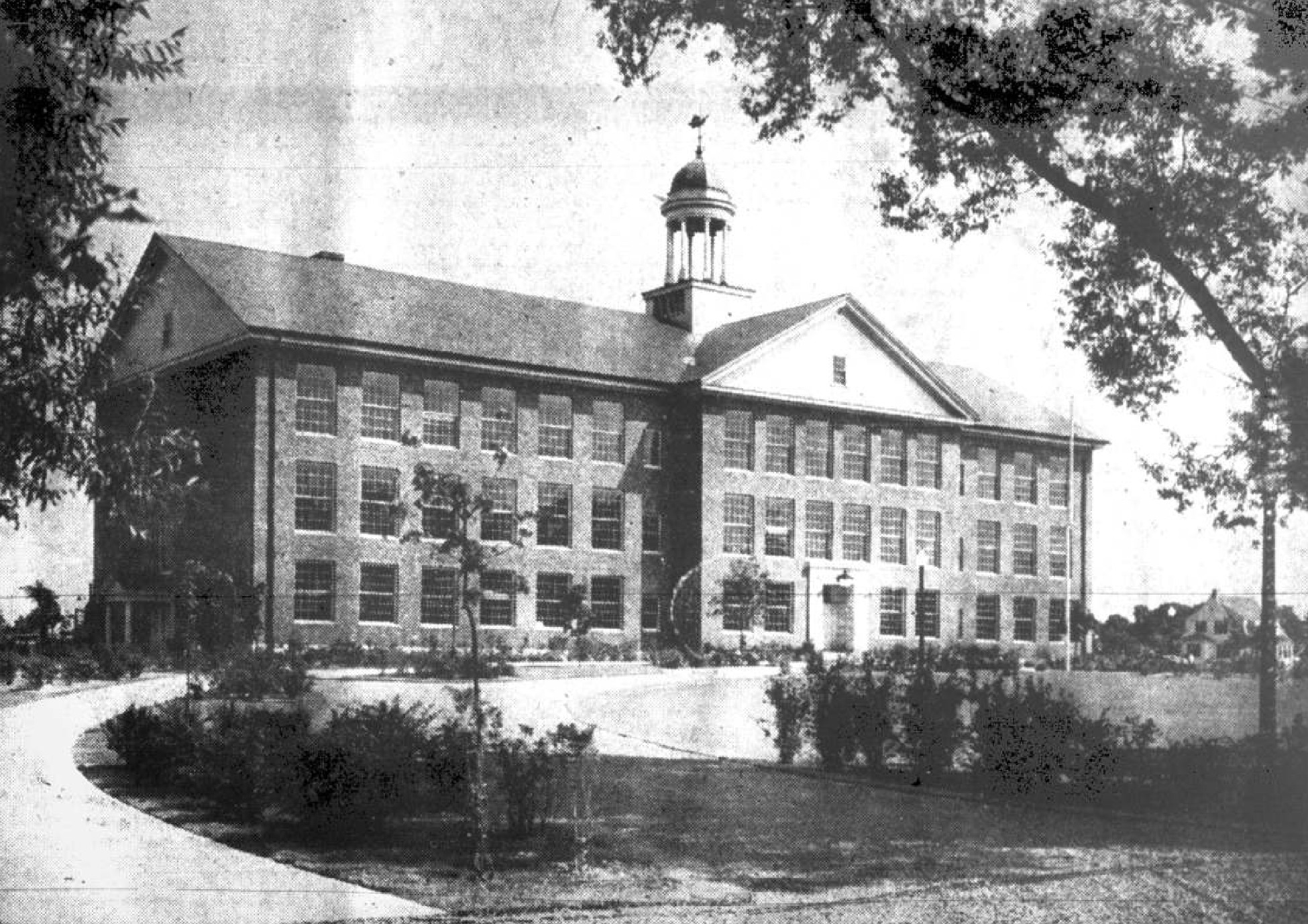
The second Hingham High School photographed after its completion in 1928

=== Notable Alumni ===
- Dick Phillips: 1949 NCAA high jump champion
- Cliff Blair: Former hammer throw world record holder and 1956 Olympic qualifier

== Hingham Middle School ==
From 1955 to 1989 the building served as the Central Junior High School. In 1967, an addition to the south wing of the building added to fit more students. In 1996, additions were made to South Junior High School to accommodate all students in the town. South Junior High School was torn down in 2014 and Hingham Middle School was built in its place.

== Hingham Town Hall ==
The building was again renovated, and since 1995, has served as the town hall. The halls of the building include heirlooms from the town's past including a portrait of General Benjamin Lincoln, a land deed bearing the mark of Sachem Wompatuck, a list of all Hingham residents to fight in World War I, parts of an old Hingham mill, and various photos and paintings. The town seal and gold lettering spelling out "HINGHAM TOWN HALL" were added to the gable.

In 1998 the Hingham Police Department moved into the expanded south wing built in 1967. This space was always small and outdated for the department, resulting in the move to a new state of the art Public Safety Building at 335 Lincoln Street which houses both the police and fire departments in June of 2025.

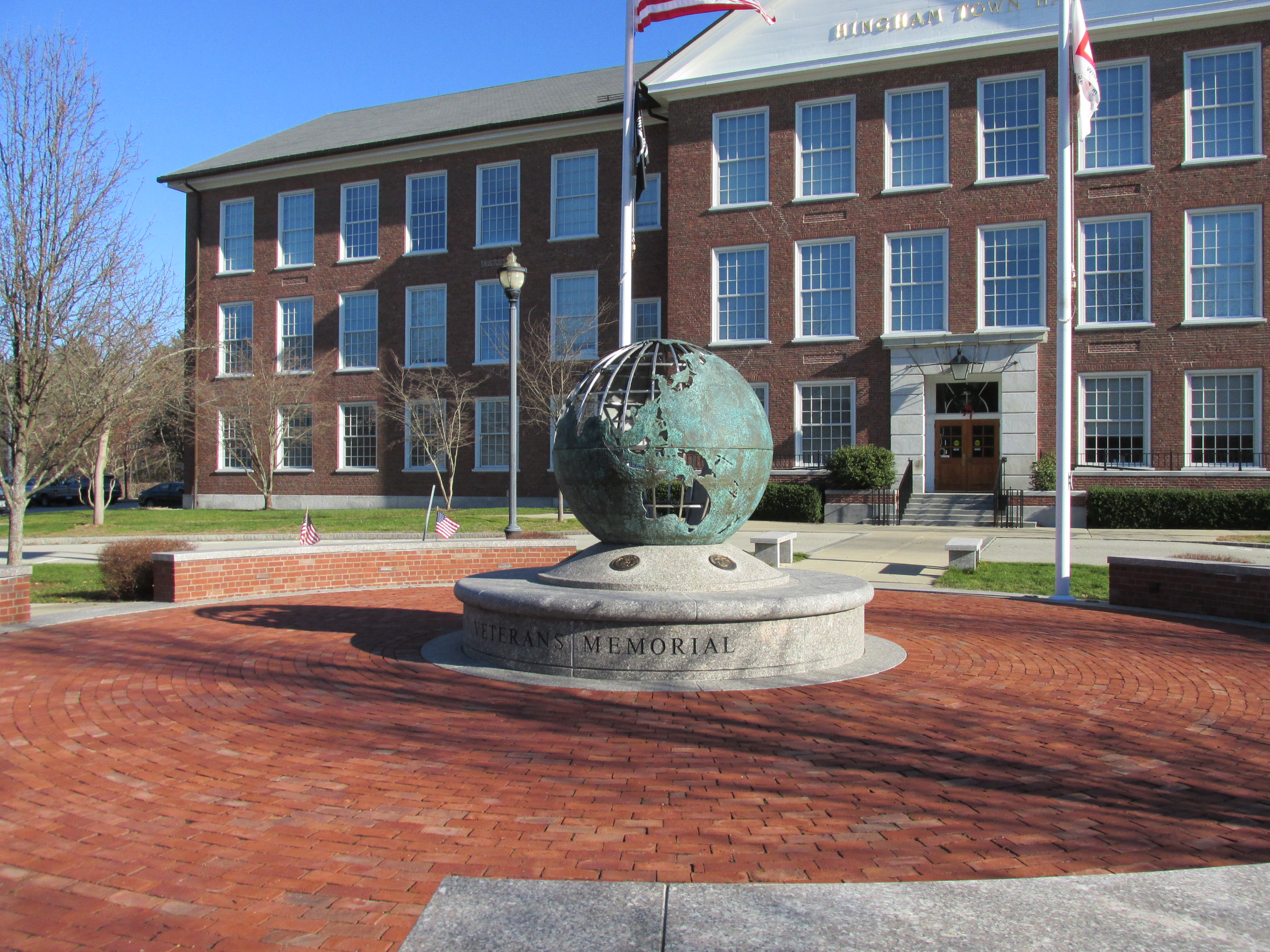
Hingham Veteran's Memorial in 2012

In 2004, a veterans memorial designed by Hingham resident Stefan Vogelman was erected in front of the building.

The Hingham Senior Center, renamed to the Center for Active Living, also uses the town hall space to organize events for Hingham seniors.

The Hingham Recreation Department manages the athletic facilities still present and added to the area over the years. In the summers the department organizes a camp which has been running on the grounds of the town hall since 1925, three years prior to the construction of the building when the area was called Central Field.

In July of 1956 the fields behind the building were named for former Hingham star athlete and coach Bill Cronin after his death in the same year. Prior to this dedication the fields were often called, "the playgrounds". The old baseball and football fields are still in use today by various youth and high school teams, although the football field is used for soccer. While the track encircling the field and the indoor gymnasium are still present, they are used for town recreation and do not host competitions. The basement also contains a fitness room outfitted with weights, machines, and cardio equipment. A basketball court, tennis/ pickleball courts, street hockey rink, beach volleyball court, and a playground are also present in the rear of the building. Many of these facilities were updated and made more accessible in 2025.
