= Carl Etelman =

American football player and coach (1900–1963)

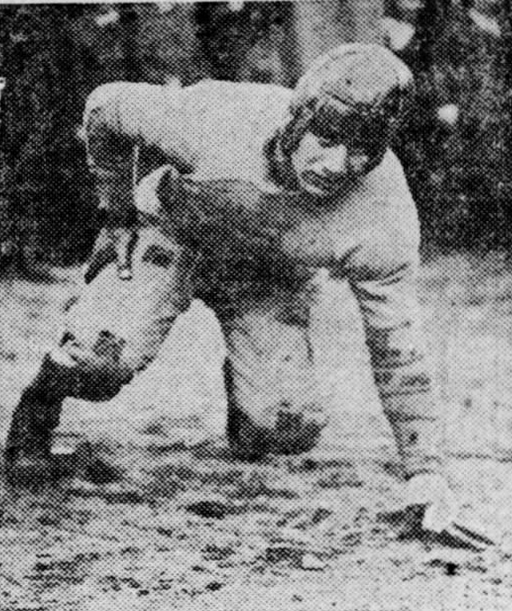
- Etelman in 1925

No. 5, 14
- Position: Back

Personal information
- Born: April 1, 1900; Fairhaven, Massachusetts, U.S.
- Died: December 18, 1963 (aged 63); Boston, Massachusetts, U.S.
- Listed height: 5 ft 8 in (1.73 m)
- Listed weight: 160 lb (73 kg)

Career information
- High school: Fairhaven
- College: Tufts

Career history

Playing
- St Alphonsus Athletic Association (1924–1925); Boston Bulldogs (1926); St Alphonsus Athletic Association (1926); Providence Steam Roller (1926); Fitton Athletic Club (1926–1927, 1929)

Coaching
- Whitman High School (c. 1924–1942); Old Town team of Abington (1928, 1930)

Career statistics
- Games played: 1
- Stats at Pro Football Reference

Carl Edward Etelman (April 1, 1900 – December 18, 1963) was an American football back and coach. After playing college football at Tufts University in Massachusetts, he played semi-professional football for the independent St Alphonsus Athletic Association (Note: Also referred to as the "Roxbury Club".) from 1924 to 1926. He also played professionally in the American Football League (AFL) and National Football League (NFL) for the Boston Bulldogs and Providence Steam Roller, before returning to the semi-pro ranks with the Fitton Athletic Club, where he spent three seasons. After his playing career, Etelman coached the Whitman High School football team in Massachusetts for 18 years, and also coached the semi-professional Old Town team of Abington for two years.

== Early life and education ==
Etelman was born on April 1, 1900, in Fairhaven, Massachusetts. He attended Fairhaven High School and Academy and graduated in 1920. In football, he was team captain as a senior and played the quarterback position, leading the team to several "big wins with his dramatic passing and running," according to The Standard-Times. At five feet eight inches tall, he was nicknamed "midget" by his teammates.

In 1920, Etelman matriculated at Tufts College—now known as Tufts University—where he starred in football, baseball, and basketball. He eventually earned five varsity letters, including three in football. A 1922 article in The Boston Globe wrote, "Coach Casey's best bet at quarter[back] is Carl Etelman. He is a good general and may be trusted to run the team in an excellent manner and, if need be, reel off many gains himself."

On a play in the 1923 season opener against Lowell Textile, Etelman returned a punt and after "dodging a handful of defenders and bouncing off a couple of others, eventually fought his way into the end zone" for a touchdown. He collapsed onto the field after reaching the goal line, and it was found that he fractured his ankle and injured his collarbone. He was done for the game, and several newspaper headlines called him out for the year. However, he returned to the starting lineup against Harvard three weeks later with a reinforced special plate and extra strap in his shoe. Stanley Woodard, for the Boston Herald, wrote:

"If you had seen Carl Etelman reeling one substantial gain after another against the freshmen team you would have been among those who could not be convinced that he broke his left ankle in the first game of the season. Yet it is a fact and two weeks ago it was in a cage.

...

After this year's Lowell Textile game Carl was done up in a cast and consigned to the sidelines. George Perry was trained to fill the position. Ten days thereafter Carl emerged from the cast and hopped about on a pair of crutches. The leg got well in surprising fashion no doubt stimulated somewhat by his great desire to play football. Soon the crutches were discarded along with the cast and before anyone knew it he was back in a football uniform and just as fast and shifty as ever.

That is the story of Carl Etelman. Two fractures of the left ankle in two years have failed to keep him out of the Tufts lineup. If anyone should give his leg a thump tomorrow and break it again you could not convince anyone at Tufts that he would not be back on the field in a week or two."

In the season finale against Massachusetts, Etelman broke his ankle again, but stayed in the game and two plays later kicked a 40-yard field goal, after which he was carried off the field. The field goal was the margin of victory for Tufts. Following the season, he was named all-New England at quarterback and to the all-Eastern team by The New York Times.

Etelman, who was Jewish, was a member of the Phi Epsilon Pi fraternity at Tufts. After graduating from Tufts with a bachelor's degree in 1924, Etelman had graduate studies at Harvard University and Boston University.

== Professional career ==
Following his graduation from Tufts, Etelman played professional and semi-professional football to stay in shape while coaching the Whitman High School football team. He started with the St Alphonsus Athletic Association, also referred to as the "Roxbury Club", in 1924. In their opening game of the 1925 season before 12,000 fans, the Athletic Association won against the Dorchester Town Team 20–0. Etelman's play was described as "the game's feature." The Boston Globe wrote,

"The St Alphonsus Association football team of Roxbury opened its season yesterday afternoon at the Fens Playground, defeating the Dorchester Town Team, 20 to 0 ... The Town Team was kept on the defensive throughout the game and not once did it succeed in carrying the ball beyond the St Alphonsus 40-yard line. Carl Etelman, quarterback on the Tufts College team last season, (Note: The Boston Globe was incorrect, as his final season of college was in 1923, not 1924.) was at the helm for St Alphonsus, and his running of punts and all-around play proved the feature of the game."

Prior to a game against the Fitton Athletic Club in the season finale, The Boston Globe wrote, "Carl Etelman, whose spectacular work has featured all the St Alphonsus victories this season, will again be at the helm. He is a good punter, a clever passer and one of the best broken field runners ever turned out at Tufts."

Etelman played for several teams during the 1926 season. At the beginning of the year, he returned to Fairhaven High School with former teammates to play the New Bedford High School, in the first matchup between the two teams in years; they had previously stopped the rivalry due to a dispute. It was played before a crowd of about 2,000, which was the largest opening day attendance the stadium had received in years. Fairhaven was victorious on a game-winning 23-yard field goal by Etelman.

Most of the crowd had reportedly come to watch him, as he was under contract in the American Football League (AFL) with the Boston Bulldogs. He was one of the "big names" on the team, and was their "signal caller." He played in just three games with the Bulldogs, wearing number 5, before returning to the St Alphonsus Athletic Association.

Etelman also played one game during 1926 for the Providence Steam Roller of the National Football League (NFL), (Note: Pro Football Archives lists two games played, one started.) coming in as a starter in his only appearance with the team. He wore number 14 with the Steam Roller.

His final team of 1926 was the Fitton Athletic Club, and he returned to play with them again in 1927, "turning many a seeming defeat into a victory with his skill and daring." He retired in 1928, but made a final return to his playing career in 1929 with Fitton.

== Coaching career ==
After graduating from Tufts, Etelman acquired a position at Whitman High School in Whitman, Massachusetts, as director of physical education and football coach. He served as their head coach for 18 years before serving in World War II. The Boston Globe in October 1935 wrote, "Carl Etelman, ex-Providence Steamroller backfield wizard, coaches the Whitman High bunch, and has been doing a bang-up job. Whitman was South Shore champion last year, losing but one game, to North Quincy. That tilt was the second game of the 1934 season, and since then, Whitman has gone unbeaten and untied."

In 1928, while serving as head coach for Whitman High School, Etelman also coached the Old Town team of Abington in football. On October 12, 1928, he coached Abington against the Fitton Athletic Club, who he had formerly played for in 1926 and 1927. A game preview in The Boston Globe wrote, "Then there is the presence of Carl Etelman as coach of Abington team. For two years Etelman was a power in the Fitton backfield ... Now that he is mentor for the Abington outfit, the Fittons will need all their skill and strength to pull out a win." In 1929, Etelman left Abington to play for Fitton, but returned to Abington in 1930 as their head coach.

== Personal life and death ==
Etelman was married to Idyla Etelman, with whom he had two children. His brother-in-law, Benjamin D. Gould, also attended Tufts and was a mayor of Vergennes, Vermont.

From 1945 until his death in 1963, he worked as a sales manager for Ward Machinery Co. of Brockton, Massachusetts. He was also involved in several civic endeavors, serving as a member of Puritan and Ezra Lodges, the finance chairman of the local Republican Party, chairman of the Temple Israel Hebrew School, and director of several youth camps.

Etelman died on December 18, 1963, in Boston, Massachusetts, after a long illness. He was 63 at the time of his death.
