= Joe Braney =

American football player and coach (1893–1949)

No. 22
- Positions: Guard, tackle

Personal information
- Born: June 29, 1893; Ireland
- Died: December 1, 1949 (aged 56)

Career information
- College: Syracuse, Fordham

Career history

Playing
- Providence Steam Roller (1924–1926)

Coaching
- Providence Steam Roller (1924)

Career NFL statistics
- Games played: 11
- Stats at Pro Football Reference

Joseph Peter "Speed" Breheney (June 29, 1893 – December 1, 1949) was a professional football player and coach with the Providence Steam Roller of the National Football League (NFL). Born in Ireland, he later changed the spelling of his name to Joe Braney. In 1924 Braney was the coach of the Steam Roller as they were still an independent team. He was replaced during the team's first season in the league, 1926, by Archie Golembeski just before the season began.

Prior to his professional career, Braney played at the college level while attending Syracuse and Fordham University. In 1915 he was a letter winner for the Orange, while in 1916 he earned a letter playing for the Rams.
