= Ed Brawley =

American football player and coach (1888–1945)

Profile
- Position: Guard

Personal information
- Born: July 17, 1893; Boston, Massachusetts, U.S.
- Died: May 1, 1956 (aged 63); Peabody, Massachusetts, U.S.
- Listed height: 5 ft 9 in (1.75 m)
- Listed weight: 175 lb (79 kg)

Career information
- College: Holy Cross

Career history
- New York Brickley Giants (1921); Cleveland Indians (1921)
- Stats at Pro Football Reference

Edward Michael Brawley (July 17, 1893 – May 1, 1956) was an American football player and coach.

== Early life ==
Brawley was born on July 17, 1893, in Roxbury. He attended Medford High School. In 1911, he was the captain of the school's state championship winning football team. He graduated in 1912 and went on to attend the College of the Holy Cross, where he played college football and participated in track and field. He was inducted into the Holy Cross Varsity Club Hall of Fame in 1988.

== Professional career ==
Brawley played in the National Football League with the New York Brickley Giants and the Cleveland Indians. Brickley's New York Giants are not related to the modern-day New York Giants founded in 1925.

== Coaching career ==
After graduating from Holy Cross, Brawley coached football, baseball, and basketball at Allen Military School in Waltham, Massachusetts, and Hillhouse High School in New Haven, Connecticut. From 1922 to 1926 he was the head football coach at Peabody High School. He also coached the University of Peabody, a semipro football team. He was the head of Peabody High's history department until his death on May 1, 1956.
