= Al Pierotti =

American football and baseball player (1895–1964)

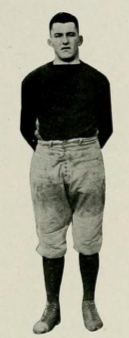
- Pierotti, c. 1918

No. 42
- Position: Center

Personal information
- Born: October 24, 1895; Boston, Massachusetts, U.S.
- Died: February 12, 1964 (aged 68); Revere, Massachusetts, U.S.
- Listed height: 5 ft 10 in (1.78 m)
- Listed weight: 204 lb (93 kg)

Career information
- High school: Everett (Massachusetts)
- College: Washington & Lee

Career history

Playing
- Akron Pros (1920); Cleveland Tigers (1920); New York Brickley Giants (1921); Milwaukee Badgers (1922); Racine Legion (1923); Milwaukee Badgers (1923–1924); Boston Bulldogs (1926); Providence Steamrollers (1927); Boston Bulldogs (1929)

Coaching
- Tufts (1918); Revere HS (1918); East Technical HS (1920); Cleveland Tigers (1920); Chelsea HS (1935–1938; assistant)

Awards and highlights
- APFA champion (Note: See also: List of NFL champions (1920–1969)) (1920)

Career statistics
- Games played: 46
- Games started: 36
- Stats at Pro Football Reference

Head coaching record
- Career: 2–2–1 (.500) (Note: See also: 1920 Cleveland Tigers (NFL) season)
- Coaching profile at Pro Football Reference

Albert Felix Pierotti (October 24, 1895 – February 12, 1964) was an American professional athlete. He played gridiron football as a center, and baseball as a pitcher. His career spanned 1920–1929 in football, and 1920–1921 in major-league baseball.

== Early life ==
Pierotti was born in Boston on October 24, 1895, and attended school in Everett, Massachusetts. He pitched a no-hitter for Everett High School in 1914.

Pierotti then attended Washington and Lee University in Lexington, Virginia, where he was captain of the Generals football team, president of the athletic association, and chairman of the athletic council. He earned varsity letters in four sports—football, basketball, baseball, and track—and was a member of Omicron Delta Kappa.

In 1918, Pierotti coached the football team at Tufts; (Note: Tufts' 1918 football team was composed of students in the Student Army Training Corps (SATC), not unusual for colleges this season due to World War I.) the team compiled a record of two wins and three losses.

Washington and Lee University lists Pierotti as a member of the class of 1923, having first entered the school in 1914. He appears as a senior in the 1922 yearbook, which notes that he left school in 1917 "and made five attempts to enter the Service, being turned down each time." It is not clear when he returned to complete his degree. He appears in a list of students awarded a Bachelor of Arts degree in June 1923.

== Football career ==
Pierotti played in the American Professional Football Association (APFA) during 1920 and 1921 with the Akron Pros, Cleveland Tigers and the New York Brickley Giants. (Note: The New York Brickley Giants are unrelated to the modern-day New York Giants.) Pierotti was a member of the 1920 APFA season champions with Akron.

When the AFPA became the National Football League (NFL) in 1922, Pierotti went on to play with the Milwaukee Badgers and Racine Legion through 1924. In 1926, Pierotti played for the Boston Bulldogs of the American Football League (AFL), an NFL rival started by Red Grange and his agent C. C. Pyle. After the Bulldogs folded, Pierotti played semi-professional football for the University of Peabody. He returned to the NFL in 1927 with the Providence Steamrollers and completed his football career with the NFL's Boston Bulldogs in 1929.

== Baseball career ==
Al Pierotti
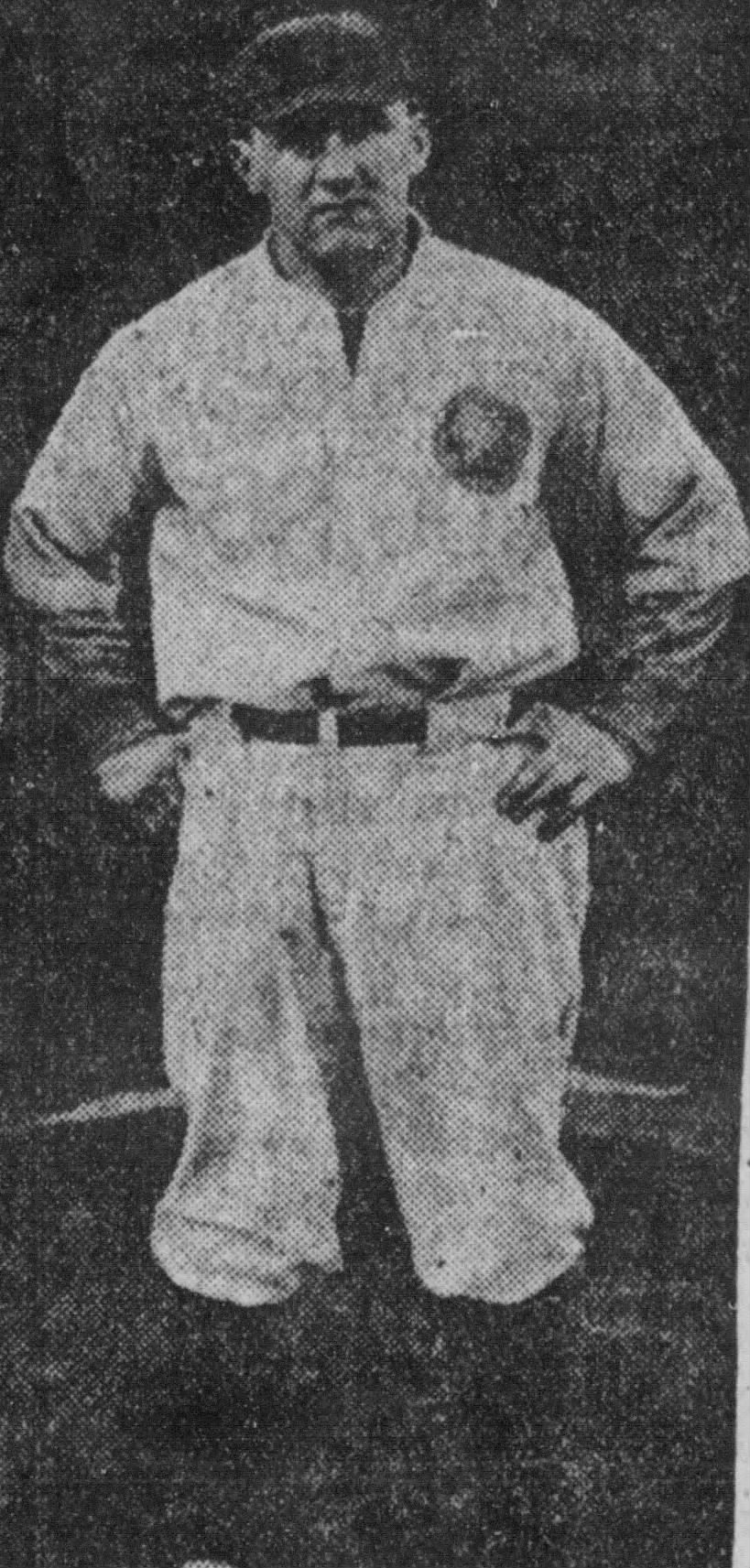
- Pierotti in March 1921
- Pitcher
- Batted: Right Threw: Right

MLB debut
- August 9, 1920, for the Boston Braves

Last MLB appearance
- April 24, 1921, for the Boston Braves

MLB statistics
- Win–loss record: 1–2
- Strikeouts: 13
- Earned run average: 4.05
- Stats at Baseball Reference

Teams
- Boston Braves (1920–1921)

Pierotti began his professional baseball career in 1919 with the minor-league Providence Grays of the Eastern League. The following season, he joined the Boston Braves in August, appearing in six games. His lone major-league victory came in a 3–2 win over the New York Giants at the Polo Grounds on September 27, 1920, when he allowed two runs on six hits and struck out three batters in a complete game effort. The Giants' defeat eliminated them from the pennant race.

Pierotti pitched in two games for the Braves in 1921, before returning to the Eastern League with the Pittsfield Hillies. After one more season, split between Pittsfield and the Waterbury Brasscos, Pierotti returned to football full-time. Overall with the major-league Braves, Pierotti compiled a 1–2 win–loss record with a 4.05 earned run average (ERA) while striking out 13 batters in 26 2/3 innings pitched.

== Wrestling career ==
In 1931, Pierotti began appearing in professional wrestling matches. On July 30, 1931, he challenged Jim Londos for the World Heavyweight Championship at the Coney Island Velodrome. Londos defeated Pierotti in 17:05 with an airplane spin. In 1932, Pierotti began refereeing matches at the Boston Arena while continuing to wrestle occasionally.

== Later life ==
In 1935, Pierotti became an assistant football coach at Chelsea High School. In 1936, he became head coach of the school's baseball team. From October 1936 to September 1938, he also hosted a "sports talk" radio show on WMEX. Pierotti remained at Chelsea High School as a teacher and baseball coach until his death on February 12, 1964. He was survived by his wife.

Pierotti was inducted to the athletic hall of fame at Washington and Lee University in 1966.
