= Joe McGlone =

American football player (1896–1963)

No. 21
- Position: Blocking back

Personal information
- Born: September 12, 1896; Natick, Massachusetts, U.S.
- Died: January 25, 1963 (aged 66); New York, New York, U.S.
- Listed height: 5 ft 7 in (1.70 m)
- Listed weight: 150 lb (68 kg)

Career information
- High school: Phillips Exeter Academy (Exeter, New Hampshire)
- College: Harvard (1922–1925)

Career history
- Providence Steam Roller (1926); Boston Bulldogs (1926)
- Stats at Pro Football Reference

Joseph Carlton McGlone (September 12, 1896 – January 25, 1963) was an American professional football player who was a blocking back for the Providence Steam Roller of the National Football League (NFL) and the Boston Bulldogs of the American Football League (AFL). He played college football for the Harvard Crimson.

== Early life and college ==
Joseph Carlton McGlone was born on September 12, 1896, in Natick, Massachusetts. He attended Phillips Exeter Academy in Exeter, New Hampshire. He served in the 101st Infantry Regiment during World War I. He was severely wounded by machine gun fire and mustard gas in the Battle of Château-Thierry but helped rescue two soldiers despite his injuries. McGlone was awarded the Croix de Guerre and the Distinguished Service Cross. He spent months in the hospital recovering from his wounds.

McGlone played college football for the Crimson Tide of Harvard University. He was on the freshman team in 1922 and the main roster from 1923 to 1925.

== Professional career ==
McGlone played in, and started, one game for the Providence Steam Roller of the National Football League in 1926. He stood 5'7" and weighed 150 pounds.

He played in five games, starting four, for the Boston Bulldogs of the American Football League during the 1926 season. He wore jersey number 21 while with the Bulldogs.

== Personal life ==
McGlone died on January 25, 1963, in New York City.
