= Johnny Gilroy =

American football player and coach (1896–1952)

Profile
- Position: Halfback

Personal information
- Born: March 5, 1896; Hudson, Massachusetts, U.S.
- Died: July 20, 1952 (aged 56)
- Listed height: 5 ft 11 in (1.80 m)
- Listed weight: 178 lb (81 kg)

Career information
- College: Georgetown

Career history

Playing
- Canton Bulldogs (1920); Cleveland Tigers (1920); Washington Senators (1921); Boston Bulldogs (1926)

Coaching
- Wofford (1921) (head coach)

Awards and highlights
- Third-team All-American (1916); Leading scorer in college football, 1916; Scored 47 points in one game, 1916

Career statistics
- Points scored (college): 307
- Touchdowns (college): 63
- PATs (college): 49
- Stats at Pro Football Reference

John Roland Gilroy (March 5, 1896 – July 20, 1952), also known as "the Great Gilroy", was an All-American football halfback for Georgetown University and a professional football player for the Canton Bulldogs (1920), Cleveland Tigers (1920), Washington Senators (1921), and Boston Bulldogs (1926).

== Early life ==
Gilroy was born on March 5, 1896, in Hudson, Massachusetts, and raised in Haverhill, Massachusetts. Gilroy was 5 feet, 11 inches in height and weighed 175 pounds. He attended high school at Haverhill High School before enrolling at Georgetown University.

== Athlete at Georgetown ==
At Georgetown, he was a star athlete and became known as "the Great Gilroy." Gilroy excelled as a rusher, passer, and kicker. In a 1915 game against North Carolina, Gilroy returned the opening kickoff 95 yards for a touchdown. Later in the year, he helped Georgetown to the most lopsided win in the school's history, a 90–0 victory over St. Louis. In 1916, Gilroy led all college football players in scoring with 160 points, including 20 touchdowns and 40 points after touchdown. He also threw 12 touchdown passes to help Georgetown to a 9–1 record. In a 1916 victory over Albright by the score of 80–0, Gilroy scored 47 points on six touchdowns and 11 points after touchdown. He also scored 37 points against Bucknell. In a 1917 game against Fordham, Gilroy was not playing "with his usual pep," and it was discovered after the game that he had been playing with a broken shoulder, leading one writer to call him "one of the gamest players of the game."

Gilroy finished his college career holding school records for career scoring (307 points), touchdowns (63), and points after touchdown (49). Gilroy graduated from Georgetown's dental school in 1919.

== Professional football ==
After graduating from college, Gilroy played professional football. He played for the Canton Bulldogs (1920), Cleveland Tigers (1920), Washington Senators (1921), and Boston Bulldogs (1926). He also served as the football coach of Wofford College for a time.

== Later life ==
Gilroy was arrested in 1940 on charges of larceny of machinery. He was charged with breaking into a Massachusetts shoe factory and stealing 35 shoe stitching machines valued at $2,200 (close to $32,000 today). The theft was alleged to have occurred in February 1939. At the time of his arrest, Gilroy (described as "a former Georgetown university football star") was married with four children and was employed as a material inspector for the Works Progress Administration. He died July 20, 1952.

== Head coaching record ==
Year	Team	Overall	Conference	Standing	Bowl/playoffs
Wofford Terriers (Southern Intercollegiate Athletic Association) (1921)
1921	Wofford	2–7	0–2	25th	
Wofford:		2–7	0–2		
Total:		2–7			

== See also ==
- 1915 College Football All-America Team
- 1916 College Football All-America Team
- List of NCAA major college football yearly scoring leaders
