= Bulger Lowe =

American football player (1895–1939)

George Lowe
No. 7, 18, 5, 14
- Positions: Tackle, end

Personal information
- Born: June 21, 1895; Arlington, Massachusetts, U.S.
- Died: February 18, 1939 (aged 43); Boston, Massachusetts, U.S.
- Listed height: 5 ft 11 in (1.80 m)
- Listed weight: 180 lb (82 kg)

Career information
- High school: Arlington (Arlington, Massachusetts); Phillips Exeter (Exeter, New Hampshire)
- College: Lafayette, Fordham

Career history

Playing
- Canton Bulldogs (1920); Cleveland Indians (1921); Providence Steam Roller (1925); Frankford Yellow Jackets (1925–1926); Boston Bulldogs (1926); Providence Steam Roller (1927)

Coaching
- Boston College (1928) (line coach); Dartmouth (1929) (line coach)

Awards and highlights
- First-team All-Pro (1921)

Career NFL statistics
- Touchdowns: 1
- Stats at Pro Football Reference

George Henry "Bulger" Lowe Jr. (June 21, 1895 – February 18, 1939) was an American football player, coach, and official. He played professionally as a tackle and end for five seasons with the Canton Bulldogs, Cleveland Indians, Providence Steam Roller, and Frankford Yellow Jackets of the National Football League (NFL) and the Boston Bulldogs of the first American Football League (AFL).

In 1909, Lowe started his football career as a 14-year-old, playing guard for Arlington High School. He attended Fordham University and was a captain of the 1917 Fordham Maroon football team.

Lowe served with the United States Army Ambulance Service in France in World War I. He was wounded and hospitalized in France.

Lowe was the first player from Fordham to play professional football, when in 1920 he was drafted to play for Frankford.

Lowe officiated college football games during the 1930s. He died on February 18, 1939, following five weeks of illness.

The Gridiron Club of Greater Boston established The George H. "Bulger" Lowe Award in 1939 to recognise New England's best offensive and defensive players in the NCAA Bowl and Championship divisions. The award is the third oldest collegiate football award in the United States, following the Heisman Trophy and Maxwell Award. The award is sometimes referred to as "New England's Heisman Trophy".
