= Cycledrome =

Stadium and velodrome in Providence, Rhode Island

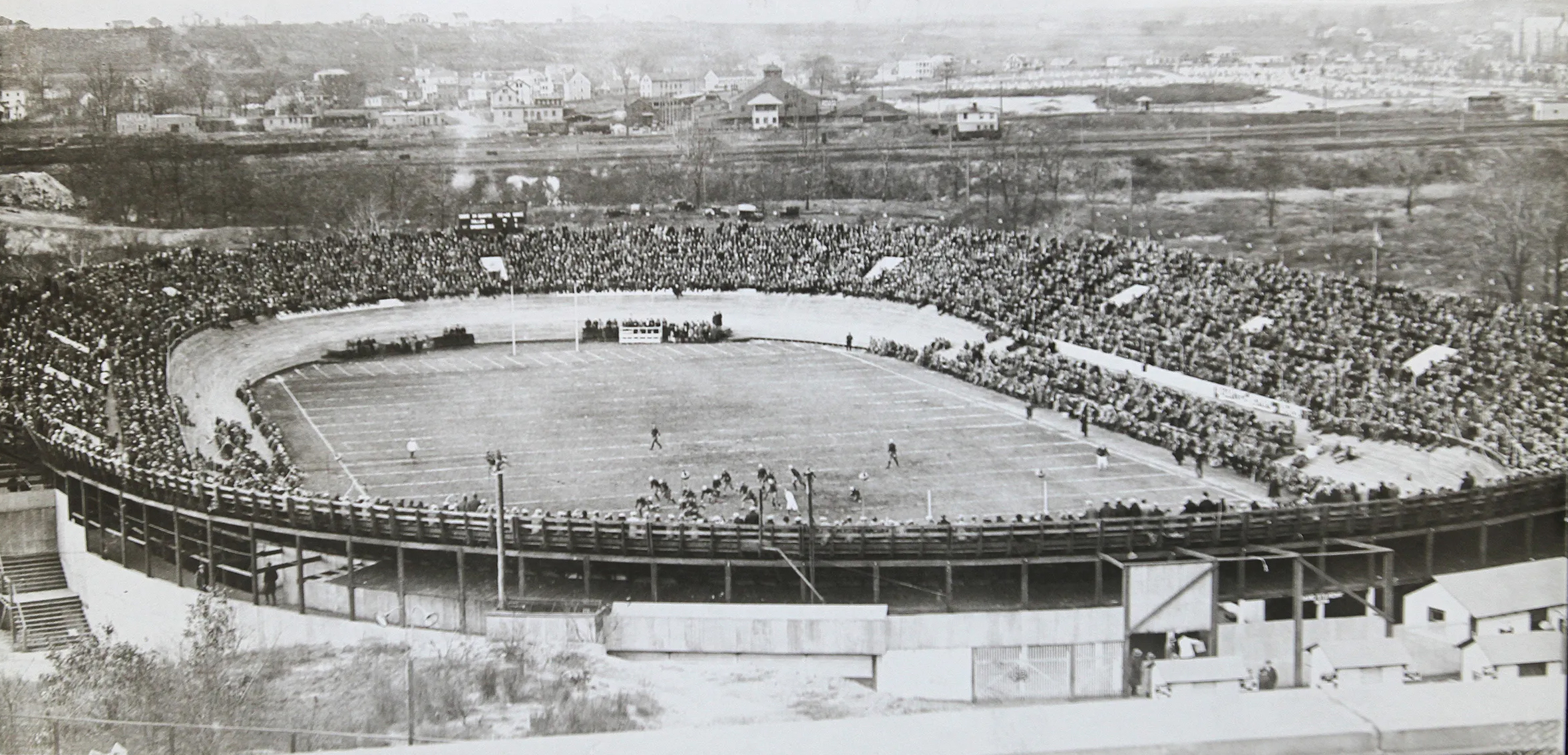
- Interactive map of Cycledrome
- Location: Providence, Rhode Island
- Coordinates: 41.857°N 71.402°W
- Owner: Providence, Rhode Island
- Operator: Providence Steam Roller
- Capacity: 10,000 (American football)
- Surface: Grass

Construction
- Built: 1925
- Closed: 1937
- Demolished: 1938

Tenants
- Providence Steam Roller (Ind.) (1916–1924); Providence Steam Roller (NFL) (1925–1933)

The Cycledrome was an American football stadium and velodrome located in Providence, Rhode Island. (Note: This reference erroneously calls it the "Cyclodome.") Its name derived from its intended use as a bicycle racing stadium (velodrome) when it was built in 1925.

== Construction ==
Construction of the Cycledrome was financed by Peter Laudati. It replaced the Cranston Cycledrome, which was demolished in 1924 to make way for a housing development. Charlie Turville, manager of the Cranston Cycledrome, was brought on to manage the Providence Cycledrome.

The Cycledrome was constructed on a plot of land behind an electric streetcar barn in between the cities of Providence and Pawtucket, Rhode Island. The venue had a capacity of 12,000, including 2,000 grandstand seats and 2,000 pavilion seats, and was surrounded by a promenade that provided shelter in case of rain. It was lit by 52 500-watt bulbs placed around the track. Improvements were also made to the surrounding area, which included adding street lights to North Main and Ann Mary Streets. The Cycledrome held its first cycling event on May 29, 1925. The track was rebuilt in 1929 after it went "boom in several places" the previous year.

== Cycling ==
The track's most prestigious annual event was the "Golden Wheel", a 50-mile race that had previously been held at the Cranston Cycledrome. The Cycledrome also hosted the New England Shrine's "Race of Nations", which featured cyclists from the United States, Italy, Belgium, and France. George M. Hendee, a former champion cyclist and head potentate of the shrine, served as the race's starter. In 1929, the Cycledrome held a round of the American motor-paced racing championship, which included Franco Giorgetti, George Chapman, Victor Hopkins, and Gerard Debaets. The 1929 season finale was headlined by a motor-paced race between Chapman, Hopkins, Larry Gaffney, Victor Rousch, Alfred Letourneur, Richard Lamb, and Francesco Zucchetti and a sprint race between Robert Spears, Horace Horder, Edward Raffe, and John Bruskie.

== Football ==
The stadium was home to the Providence Steam Roller of the National Football League (NFL) from 1925 to 1933, who played their games in the infield of the velodrome. The football field was snugly surrounded by a wooden track with steeply-banked ends, which cut sharply into the end zones and reduced them to just five yards in depth. During football games, temporary seating was permitted on the straight-away portion of the track, which was so close to the field that players, after being tackled, often found themselves in the stands. In 1930, floodlights were installed at the stadium for night games, and the Steam Roller became the first NFL team to host a game under lights.

The Cycledrome was also used by the Providence Huskies and hosted high school games.

== Soccer ==
The Cycledrome, along with Kinsley Park and Lonsdale Avenue Pitch, served as the home field for Providence F.C. of the American Soccer League. In 1929, the stadium hosted a match between Preston North End F.C. and Bethlehem Steel F.C. In 1932, the Pawtucket Rangers played a game against the Boston Bears at the Cycledrome.

== Boxing ==
The Cycledrome hosted its first boxing event on June 3, 1925. It was headlined by Babe Herman and Tommy "Kid" Murphy. On August 25, 1931, the Veterans of Foreign Wars held a boxing card headlined by Lou Brouillard and Jackie Brady. Brouillard won the bout on points. On September 5, 1932, Providence's Eddie Holmes defeated Christopher Battalino by decision at the Cycledrome. Holmes headlined a card at the Cycledrome the following year as well. He defeated Baby Joe Gans in ten rounds, while on the undercard Joey Archibald defeated Francis Walsh.

== Wrestling ==
Gentleman Jack Washburn defeated Battling Billy Bartush in the main event of a wrestling card held at the Cycledrome on July 26, 1932. On August 31, 1932, Henri Deglane defeated Casey Kazanjian in 45 minutes to retain his World Heavyweight Championship.

== Later years ==
In its later years, the Cycledrome was the location of the E. M. Loew's drive-in theater. The site is now home to an Ocean State Job Lot and a Peter Pan Bus Terminal.
