= Hingham High School =

Coordinates: 42°13′39″N 70°52′42″W

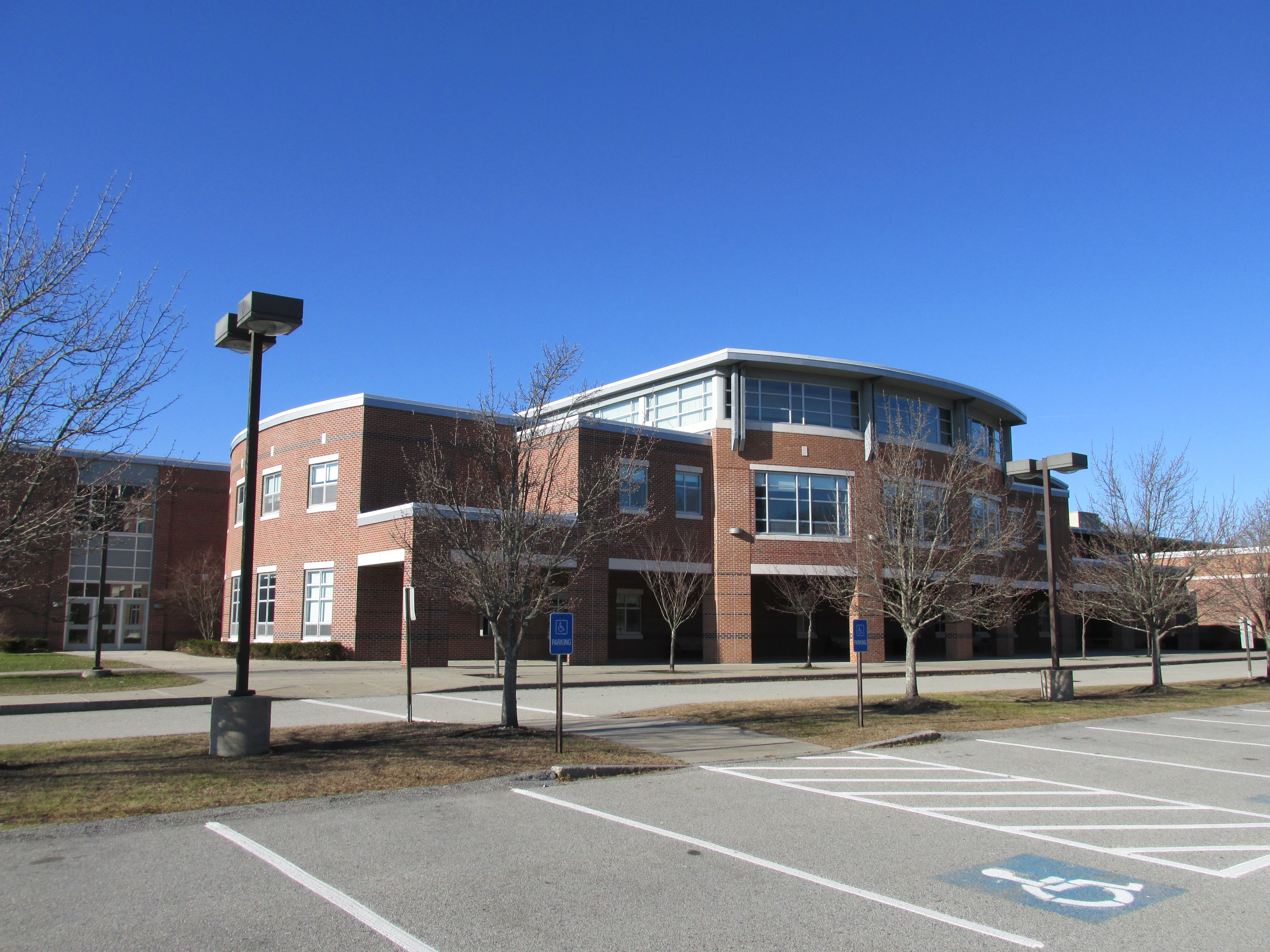
- Hingham High School
- 17 Union St., Hingham, MA 02043; United States

Information
- Type: Public
- Established: 1872
- Principal: John Buckey, interim
- Staff: 90.80 (FTE)
- Grades: 9–12
- Enrollment: 1,100 (2023–2024)
- Student to teacher ratio: 12.11
- Campus: Suburban
- Colors: Red & White & Black
- Mascot: Harbormen
- Newspaper: Happenings, Harborlight
- Website: hinghamschools.org/hingham-high-school/

Hingham High School is a co-ed public high school serving grades 9 through 12 for the town of Hingham, Massachusetts, United States. It is located on Union Street near Hingham Center. This school was ranked number 985 on Newsweek's 2005 list of the Best High Schools in America. In 2014, Hingham High School was ranked as one of the top 50 public high schools in the state of Massachusetts. The school colors are red and white.

Hingham High School is the only public high school in the town of Hingham. The total enrollment into the school is 1,128. There are 292 students in the 9th grade, 289 students in the 10th grade, 262 students in the 11th grade, and 278 students in the 12th grade. It is made up of 51 percent male and 49 percent female. The minority enrollment is 7 percent, and the white enrollment is 93 percent. There are 77 full-time teachers.

== History ==
=== Building ===
The school was constructed in 1954, after the old school became overcrowded. The building has been added to and renovated multiple times in its history. The first addition was completed in 1965. Another addition totaling $25.9 million was completed in 2001 and added sixteen classrooms, expanded the library and music rooms, modernized the science equipment, and replaced heating, electrical, and plumbing equipment. In the spring of 2019, a fire caused by malfunctioning electrical equipment damaged a large portion of the second floor of the building. Nobody was hurt and school year continued without the use of that section of the building.

=== Academics and awards ===
Around 2005 the school received a history teacher who was fluent in Mandarin Chinese. The school began teaching the Chinese language around that time. In 2009, the school was awarded a Blue Ribbon by the United States Department of Education for academic excellence. In 2015, Hingham High was awarded the Green Ribbon by the United States Department of Education for its commitment to protecting the environment, reducing environmental impact and utility costs, and providing environmental education.

== Facilities and athletics ==
The school has a gymnasium used for physical education classes, basketball, and volleyball. The football field is the home of the school's football, lacrosse, and soccer teams. A baseball and softball field on the grounds are home to their respective sports. The perimeter of the large field is used as the school's cross country course, and the track hosts home meets and practices, while Michelson Field inside the track formerly hosted football games before the construction of the turf field. In 2026 the track was dedicated as the "Fred Jewett Track at Michelson Field" to honor longtime Hingham High School teacher and coach Fred Jewett. The hockey team's home rink in at Pilgrim Arena, while the crew team rows in Bear Cove Park.

In the fall of 2025, the construction of The DOCK Fitness and Wellness Center powered by New Balance was completed next to the track. An older weight room is inside the school.

The schools athletic programs have found success in the schools history, with the hockey, soccer, track, skiing, and lacrosse teams winning state titles and many of the other teams winning multiple league titles.

== Notable alumni ==
- Lilly Reale (2021), soccer player for the Boston Legacy
- Dan Perrault (2004), actor, writer, and producer known for American Vandal and The Residence
