= Erwin Gehrke =

American football player (1898–1966)

Profile
- Positions: Fullback, Halfback, Quarterback

Personal information
- Born: April 25, 1898; Cleveland, Ohio
- Died: June 8, 1966; Fairfield, Ohio
- Listed height: 6 ft 0 in (1.83 m)
- Listed weight: 190 lb (86 kg)

Career information
- College: Harvard University

Career history
- Boston Bulldogs (1926)

Erwin Lawrence Gehrke (April 25, 1898 – June 8, 1966) was a professional football fullback, halfback, and quarterback in the first American Football League. In his one-season career he played for the Boston Bulldogs in 1926.

Prior to joining the AFL, Gehrke played college football at Harvard University in Boston, Massachusetts. While at Harvard, Erwin also played baseball for the school.

His parents, Hermann and Augusta Gerken, were German emigrants.
