= Bill Cronin (tight end) =

American football player (1943–1991)

No. 87, 90
- Position: Tight end

Personal information
- Born: November 20, 1943; Lawrence, Massachusetts, U.S.
- Died: November 5, 1991 (aged 47); Westmont, New Jersey, U.S.
- Listed height: 6 ft 5 in (1.96 m)
- Listed weight: 231 lb (105 kg)

Career information
- College: Boston College
- AFL draft: 1965: 15th round, 115th overall pick

Career history
- Philadelphia Eagles (1965); Miami Dolphins (1966)

Awards and highlights
- First-team All-East (1964)
- Stats at Pro Football Reference

William F. Cronin, Jr. (November 20, 1943 – November 5, 1991) was an American football tight end who played one season with the Miami Dolphins of the American Football League (AFL). He was drafted by the Oakland Raiders in the fifteenth round of the 1965 AFL draft. He played college football at Boston College. Cronin was also a member of the Philadelphia Eagles of the National Football League (NFL).

== College career ==
Cronin played college football for the Boston College Eagles and was a team captain.

== Professional career ==
Cronin was selected by the Oakland Raiders of the AFL with the 115th pick in the 1965 AFL draft. He signed with the Philadelphia Eagles of the NFL in 1965 and spent most of the season on the taxi squad. He played for the AFL's Miami Dolphins in 1966.

== Officiating career ==
Cronin became a football official after his playing career. He was selected to officiate eight postseason games, including the 1991 Hall of Fame Bowl, the 1989 Sugar Bowl and the 1987 Cotton Bowl. The NFL had asked him to submit an application in 1987 but he did not do so until January 1991 due to the birth of a child.

== Death ==
He died of a heart attack on November 5, 1991, at his home in Westmont, New Jersey.

== Personal life ==
Cronin's father Bill and uncle Jack also played football.

Cronin had three children from his first marriage and a fourth, Micheal P. Cronin, from his second marriage.
