= Herb Treat =

American football player and coach (1900–1947)

Profile
- Position: Tackle

Personal information
- Born: December 16, 1900; Cambridge, Massachusetts, U.S.
- Died: April 19, 1947 (aged 46); Kansas City, Missouri, U.S.

Career information
- High school: Somerville (MA)
- College: Boston College, Princeton

Career history

Playing
- 1920: Boston College
- 1922: Princeton
- 1926: Boston Bulldogs

Coaching
- 1926: Boston Bulldogs

Awards and highlights
- National champion (1922); Consensus All-American (1922)

Charles Herbert Treat (December 16, 1900 – April 19, 1947) was an American football player who played for Princeton University and was unanimously selected as an All-American at the tackle position in 1922. He was also the player-coach of the first professional football team in Boston, the Boston Bulldogs of 1926. In 1943, Treat was badly injured when he was struck by an automobile, and he died four years later after falling nine stories from a hotel in Kansas City, Missouri.

== Football player ==
A native of Somerville, Massachusetts, Treat began his football career at Somerville High School and then at Phillips Exeter Academy. In 1920, he gained acclaim as a star football player for Boston College. When Treat decided to transfer to Princeton in August 1921, The New York Times reported: "Boston College football prospects for the approaching gridiron season received quite a jolt today when it became known that Herbert Treat, the star varsity tackle of last season, had decided to quit Newton Heights and cast his fortunes with Princeton University. ... Treat will enter Princeton as a sophomore and after his year's residence, required by the 'Big Three' regulations, he will be eligible for the Princeton eleven."

In 1922, Treat and Pink Baker led Princeton to an undefeated season and national championship as part of a team that became known as the "Team of Destiny." Princeton defeated western power, the University of Chicago, by a final score of 21–18, after rallying from an 18–7 deficit in the fourth quarter and holding Chicago four times near the goal line in the final seconds. The 1922 Princeton-Chicago match was the first football game broadcast on WOR radio.

After graduating from Princeton in 1923, Treat became an assistant football coach at Providence College in Rhode Island. In 1926, Treat became the player-coach of Boston's first professional football team—the Boston Bulldogs in the first American Football League. The team lasted only six games, playing one home game in Braves Field and one in Fenway Park.

== Later years and death ==
In 1927, Treat played a role in the rescue of four youths who broke through the ice on Boston's Jamaica Pond.

During World War II, Treat worked at Bethlehem Steel Co.'s Hingham Shipyard. He suffered serious head injuries in August 1943 when he was struck by an automobile while crossing the street in Weymouth, Massachusetts. He was in critical condition on arrival and spent several days in the hospital.

After the war, Treat reportedly worked as an "investment broker" in Boston. In April 1947, Treat, at age 47, was killed in a plunge from the window of his ninth floor room at the Muehlebach Hotel in downtown Kansas City, Missouri. Treat's body, clad only in a topcoat, was discovered in the early morning hours by a taxi driver. The coroner reported finding a note in the room addressed to Treat's wife, Muriel K. Treat. The note read, "On vacation. Couldn't stand it." Friends reported that he had been suffering from tuberculosis and was en route to Arizona after being told his condition was incurable. Another news account reported that he had traveled to Kansas City for "medical treatment for complications from crippling injuries" he sustained in the 1943 automobile accident." He had spent several months in a sanitarium in Rutland, Massachusetts.
