= Lincoln School Apartments =

Coordinates: 42°14′22.21″N 70°53′18.5″W

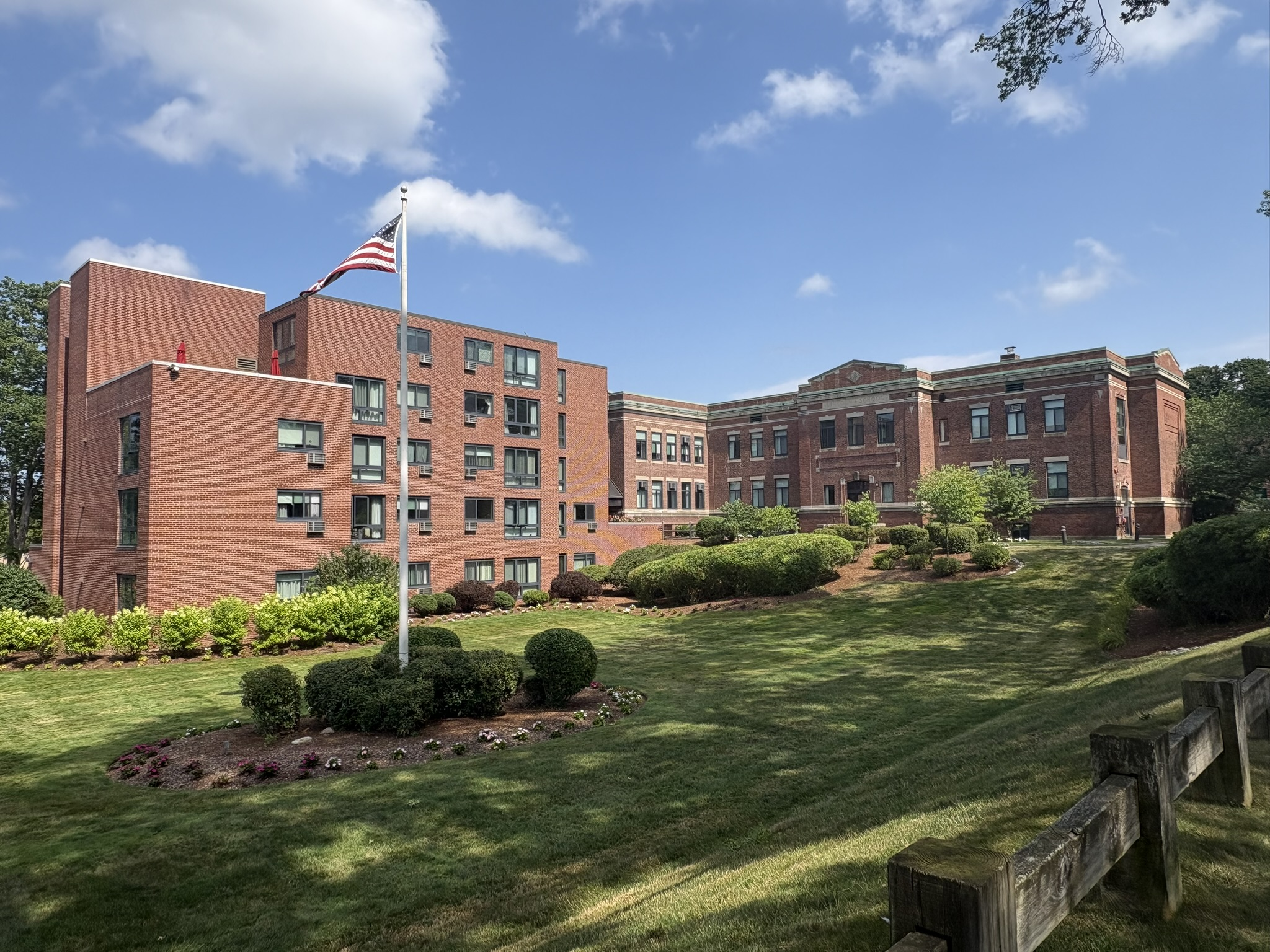
- Former names: Lincoln School (1912–1979) Lincoln School Apartments (1982–Present)

General information
- Location: 86 Central Street, Hingham, MA 02043
- Year built: 1912-1913
- Renovated: 1979–1982
- Owner: Town of Hingham

Website
- https://www.lincolnschoolapts.com/

The Lincoln School Apartments is a building in Hingham, Massachusetts which once served as the town's junior high school and is now an affordable senior housing complex.

== Construction ==
The building was built in 1912 and opened to the public on February 12, 1913 for inspection, on what would have been Abraham Lincoln's 104th birthday. Upon the opening of the school, a life size statue of Lincoln was placed in a niche in the main hallway. The statue was a replica of Augustus Saint-Gaudens' Abraham Lincoln: The Man and cost $100. The fundraising and purchasing was organized by ten local schoolboys. The local paper described the school as "adequete in every respect".

== Apartments ==
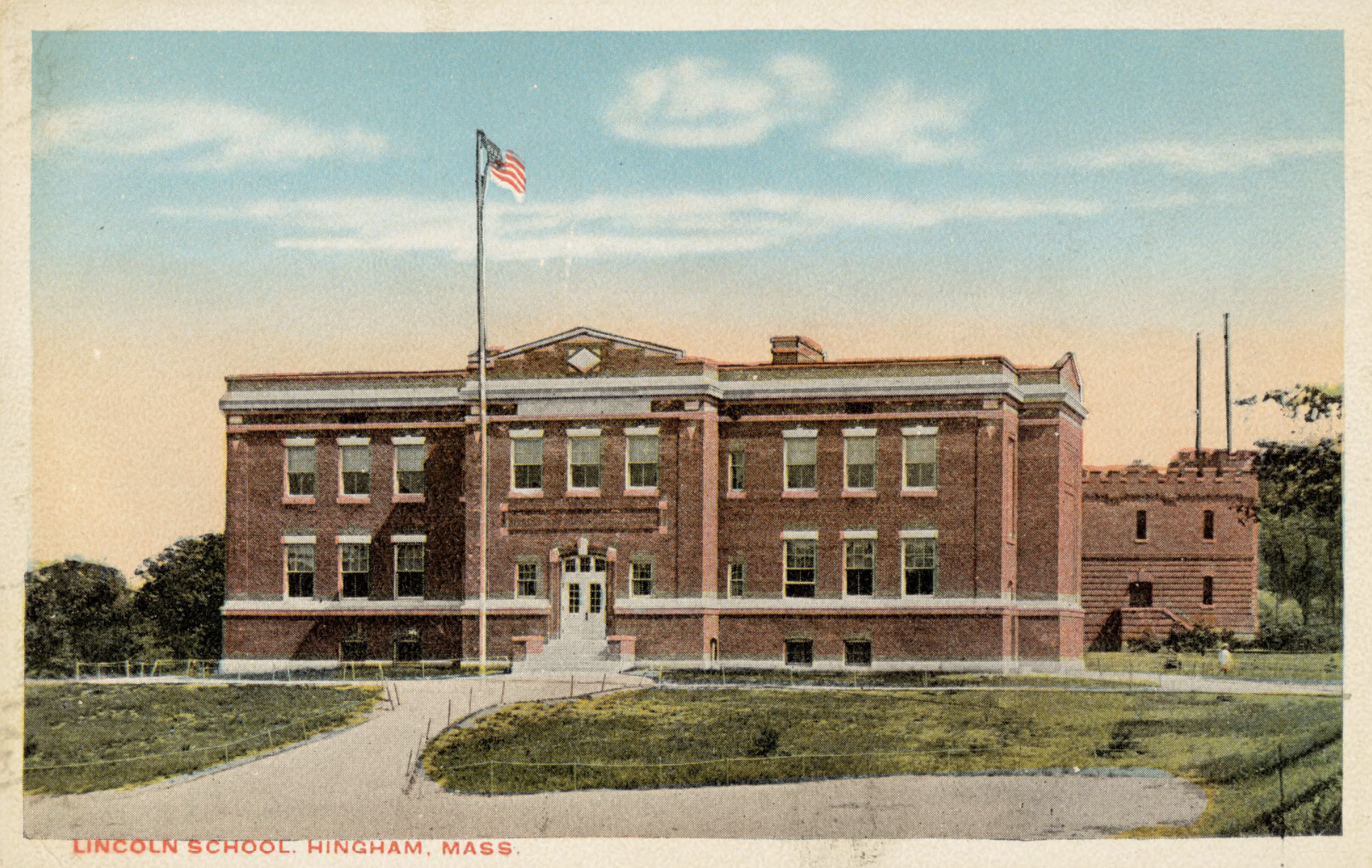
A postcard made between 1912 and 1917 showing the school prior to its renovation into apartments. The State Armory can be seen in the background to the right.

In 1979, when it was no longer used as a school, the building was purchased by the Benedictine Fathers of Glastonbury Abbey in Hingham. It was renovated into apartments and reopened in 1982. In 2008 the Town of Hingham bought the property back. The building contains mostly one bedroom apartments, but also has studio and two bedroom units as well.
