= Bill Cronin (fullback) =

American football player (1901–1956)

No. 9, 6
- Position: Fullback

Personal information
- Born: December 5, 1901; Hingham, Massachusetts, U.S.
- Died: March 16, 1956 (aged 54); Hingham, Massachusetts, U.S.
- Listed height: 5 ft 10 in (1.78 m)
- Listed weight: 183 lb (83 kg)

Career information
- High school: Hingham (MA)
- College: Boston College

Career history
- Boston Bulldogs (1926); Providence Steam Roller (1927–1929)

Awards and highlights
- NFL champion (1928)
- Stats at Pro Football Reference

William Cronin (December 5, 1901 – March 16, 1956) was an American professional football fullback who played three seasons with the Providence Steam Roller of the National Football League (NFL). He played college football at Boston College. He was also a member of the Boston Bulldogs of the American Football League (AFL).

== Early life ==
Cronin played high school football at Hingham High School in Hingham, Massachusetts. He started the Harbormen hockey team in the early 1940s. He was inducted into the Hingham High School Athletic Hall of Fame in 1999.

== College career ==
Cronin played college football for the Boston College Eagles.

== Professional career ==
Cronin played for the Boston Bulldogs of the AFL in 1926. He played for the Providence Steam Roller of the NFL from 1927 to 1929.

== Personal life ==
Cronin's son Bill and brother Jack also played football. After Cronin's death in 1956, the local Hingham athletic field located at the High School was renamed "Cronin Field".
