= Providence Huskies =

The Providence Huskies were a professional American football team based in Providence, Rhode Island. The team descended from the Providence Steam Roller, a team that played in the National Football League from 1924 to 1931 and likewise had a husky as its mascot and logo. The team was owned by Sam Rushton who served as an owner, manager and (at 50 years old) player for the team.

The Huskies are noteworthy for going undefeated in 1933 and for not allowing a single point to be scored against them. While largely forgotten by history, the Providence Huskies possibly rank as the most perfect team in semi pro and professional football history, for both being undefeated and for holding their opponents scoreless for a flawless 10–0 season. The team apparently folded after playing for one season.
