= Boston Bulldogs (AFL) =

General information
- Founded: 1926
- Folded: 1926
- Stadium: Braves Field; Fenway Park
- Headquartered: Boston, Massachusetts, United States
- Colors: Dark Blue, White

Personnel
- Owner: Robert McKirby
- Head coach: Herb Treat

Team history
- Boston Bulldogs (1926)

League / conference affiliations
- American Football League (1926)

The Boston Bulldogs were a professional American football team that competed in the first American Football League in 1926. Owned by Robert McKirby, the Bulldogs lasted only six games into the AFL season, playing one home game in Braves Field and one in Fenway Park. Coached by player-coach Herb Treat, the majority of the team played their college football in New England, Pennsylvania, and New York. The offense, marked by its inconsistent performance was led by Joe McGlone (who started the season playing for the Providence Steam Roller) was inconsistent, scoring a total of 20 points in its existence... 17 of which were tallied in one game (a 17–0 victory over the Brooklyn Horsemen on October 17, 1926). Erwin Gehrke and Carl Etelman shared the kicking duties. Bill Cronin, a tailback, scored the team's only offensive touchdown (the other TD was scored on a fumble recovery by Charlie Morrison).

While Robert McKirby was the owner of the team, it was subsidized by league founders C. C. Pyle and Red Grange (who owned the New York Yankees, the Los Angeles Wildcats, and a portion of the Chicago Bulls). While the team's first home game (a 13–0 loss to the Yankees at Fenway Park, October 9, 1926) drew 12,000 fans, only 2,000 fans attended the team's next game (a 21-0 demolition by the Wildcats at Braves Field). The Bulldogs were not a draw on the road, having drawn no more than 4,000 people to any game away from Boston. Despite the financial support by C. C. Pyle, the team was in such financial straits that it became the fourth AFL team to leave the league (November 14, 1926 – after Newark, Cleveland, and Brooklyn).

With the departure of the Rock Island Independents the following week, the fate of the first American Football League was sealed. Its last official game (the Yankees vs. the Bulls at Comiskey Park) was played on December 12, 1926. The AFL was no more.

Year	W	L	T	Finish	Coach
1926	2	4	0	6th	Herb Treat

== After the first AFL ==
Immediately after the sudden departure of the Bulldogs from the AFL, two of the team's members managed to join other rosters in either the NFL or the AFL. Carl Etelman and Vern Hagenbuckle both joined the Providence Steam Roller in late November and finished their NFL careers the next month.

On the other hand, a few members of the 1926 Boston Bulldogs continued their pro football careers by signing contracts with National Football League teams:

Bill Cronin – 1927–29 Providence Steam Roller
Bull Lowe – 1927 Providence Steam Roller
Al Pierotti – 1927 Providence Steam Roller, 1929 Boston Bulldogs (NFL)

In 1929, there was a new Boston Bulldogs franchise in the National Football League. Unrelated to the AFL team, it was the relocated Pottsville Maroons franchise. It, too, lasted only one season in Boston before calling it quits.
