= Pearce Johnson =

American football manager

Pearce B. Johnson was a part-time sports editor for the Providence Journal and the general manager of the Providence Steam Roller of the National Football League. He was also one of the original founders of the team and served as the team's manager throughout its entire history (1916–1933). He is best known for hosting the very first night game in NFL history. After the team ended play in 1931, Johnson organized a semi-pro version of the Steam Roller in 1932 to play small-scale local teams. He also managed a minor league version of the Providence Steam Roller in the American Association in the 1940s. Later in life, he became a football historian for the Pro Football Researchers Association and was at one time their oldest member.

During football season, Johnson rented out several rooms in his house on High Service Avenue in North Providence, to Steam Roller players. His mother also helped by boarding several of the players under her roof. She kept them well-fed until, and did their laundry all for $15 a week. The day after Thanksgiving, while out shopping for groceries for "her boys," Mrs. Johnson was struck and killed by a streetcar.
