= James Dooley (Rhode Island politician) =

American judge

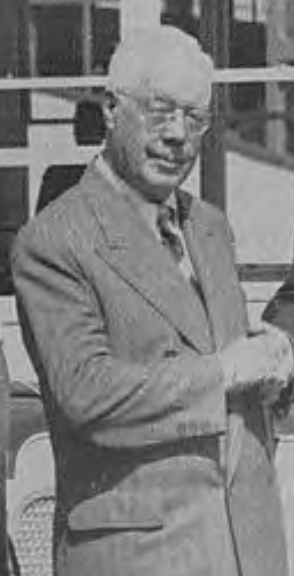
James E. Dooley in 1949

James E. Dooley (1886–1960) was a leading sports figure in Rhode Island. He became part owner of the Providence Steam Roller of the National Football League from 1916 until 1933 when the team folded. The 1928 team won the NFL Championship with an 8-1-2 record. He had a decades-long association with the Narragansett Park race track in Pawtucket. Dooley was also a founder of the Providence Reds of the Canadian-American Hockey League (CAHL) and was also the one-time president of the CAHL.

== Biography ==
Dooley was a graduate of Georgetown Law School. Early in his career, in 1916, Dooley became a judge, succeeding Willis Knowles, who was a murder victim, as judge of the Rhode Island Eighth District Court. He served in that post for a year before resigning. However, the title "Judge" stuck to him for the rest of his life.

Judge Dooley was a member of the Rhode Island General Assembly. As a state legislator, he fought to win approval for horse race pari-mutuel gambling in Rhode Island. On May 18, 1934, his bill passed the state legislature and, by a 4-1 margin in a special election, horse race gambling became legal in Rhode Island.

The purchase of the What Cheer Airport, on the Pawtucket / East Providence, Rhode Island line, was arranged for $150,000 during his tenure.

On August 1, 1934, 74 days after the state referendum, Narragansett Park opened for horse racing. Walter E. O'Hara, a Fall River, Massachusetts industrialist, formed the Narragansett Racing Association and was named president and manager. Judge Dooley was appointed racing secretary. He later became president of the association in 1938, succeeding O'Hara, and held onto the post until his death in 1960.

Dooley's son, J. Alden Dooley, took over as president after his father's death and ran the track until 1975. His son, James A. Dooley, Jr., took over until Narragansett Park closed in September 1978.
