= Providence Steam Roller =

Defunct American football team

General information
- Founded: 1916
- Folded: 1931
- Stadium: Kinsley Park (1916–1924); Cycledrome (1925–1931)
- Headquartered: Providence, Rhode Island, United States
- Colors: Black, orange, white

Personnel
- Owners: Charles Coppen; James Dooley; Peter Laudati
- General manager: Pearce Johnson
- Head coach: Joe Braney (1916–1924); Archie Golembeski (1925); Jim Laird (1926); Jimmy Conzelman (1928–30); Ed Robinson (1931)

Team history
- Providence Steam Roller (1916–31)

League / conference affiliations
- Independent (1916–24); National Football League (1925–31)

Championships
- League championships: 0; 1928

The Providence Steam Roller was a professional American football team based in Providence, Rhode Island in the National Football League (NFL) from 1925 to 1931. Providence was the first New England team to win an NFL championship. The Steam Roller won the league's championship in 1928, which is the latest NFL championship win by a defunct team to date. Most of their home games were played at the Cycledrome, a 10,000-seat stadium that was built as a velodrome for bicycle races.

== History ==
=== Pre-NFL ===
The Steam Roller were established in 1916 by members of the Providence Journal; sports-editor Charles Coppen and part-time sports-writer Pearce Johnson. Three men shared in the ownership and management of the team: Coppen, James Dooley, and Peter Laudati. Meanwhile, Johnson stayed on as the team's manager for each year of its existence.

The team soon became a regional power and by the mid-1920s was known as the best independent team in the country. By 1919 the team was drawing in more spectators than Brown University by a margin of 2–1, according to newspaper reports at the time. However, it seemed unlikely since the Steam Roller crowd was on average 3,000 spectators a game. The players' wages were lower than those of Indiana and Ohio, so it was harder for the Steam Roller to bring in "ringers". Several college football players did play for the Steam Roller, but under aliases, so as not to jeopardize their amateur status.

In 1924, Providence's schedule featured several NFL teams. The Steam Roller posted a 3–2–1 record against those teams, defeating the Rochester Jeffersons (3–0), Minneapolis Marines (49–0) and Dayton Triangles (10–7). Both of their losses came against the Yellow Jackets (21–10) and (16–3). The team also posted a scoreless tie against the Columbus Tigers. The team's success that season was enough to make Steam Roller management and fans start thinking about playing in the NFL.

=== NFL years ===
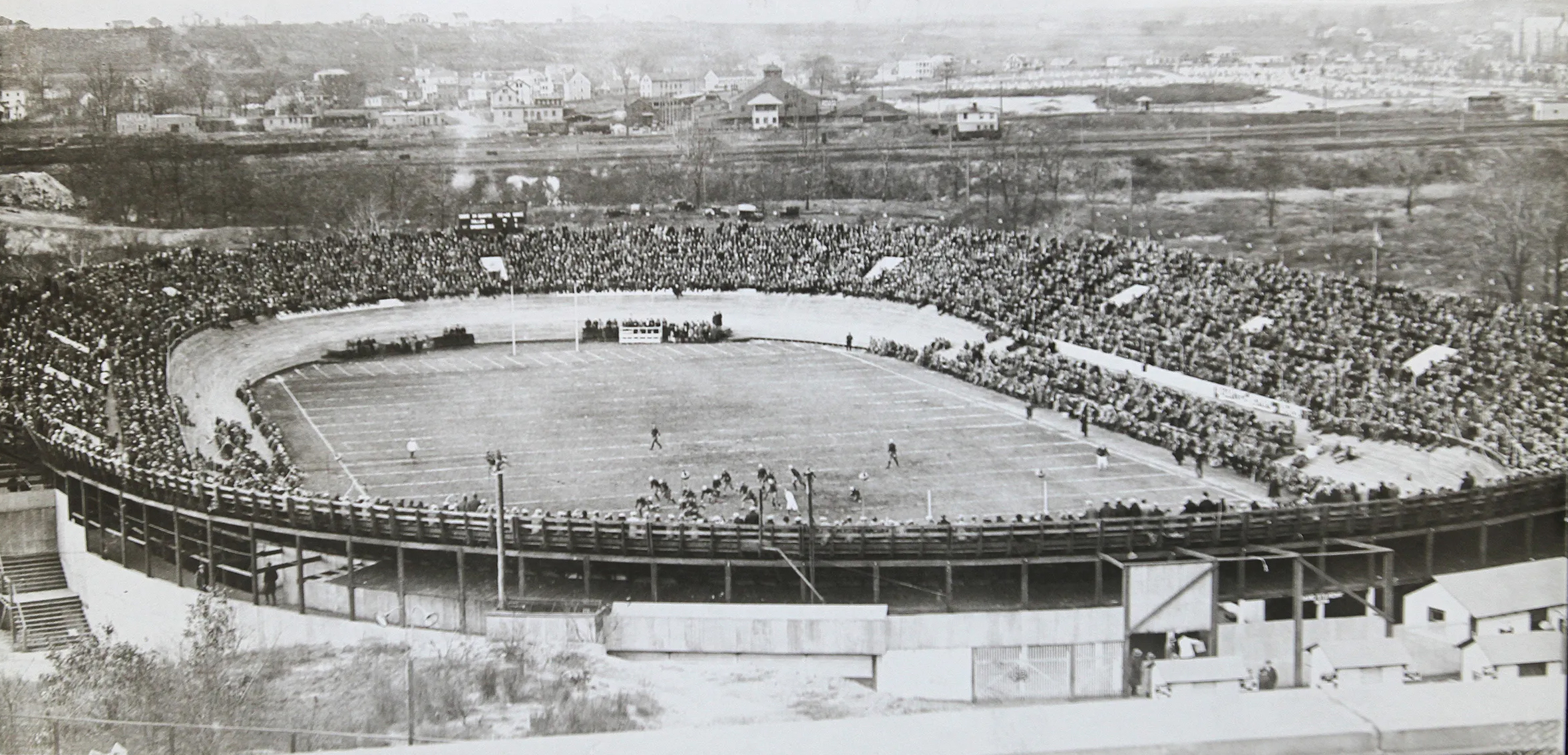
A 1928 Steam Roller football game at the Cycledrome

Providence joined the NFL in time for the 1925 season. By that time only three players from the 1924 team were still in the line-up when the team's first practice of 1925 was held on September 17. In fact, only about a dozen of them wore Steam Roller's colors for the team's debut in the NFL. The Steam Roller played mediocre football in their first two NFL seasons, but posted a strong 8–5–1 record in 1927 with Jim Conzelman as the team's head coach. For his per game salary of $292, Conzelman not only coached the team but also played quarterback in the single-wing formation. The star player for Providence was halfback George "Wildcat" Wilson, a 1925 All-American from the University of Washington who had spent the 1926 season as the head of the traveling Los Angeles Wildcats of the AFL.

==== 1928 championship season ====
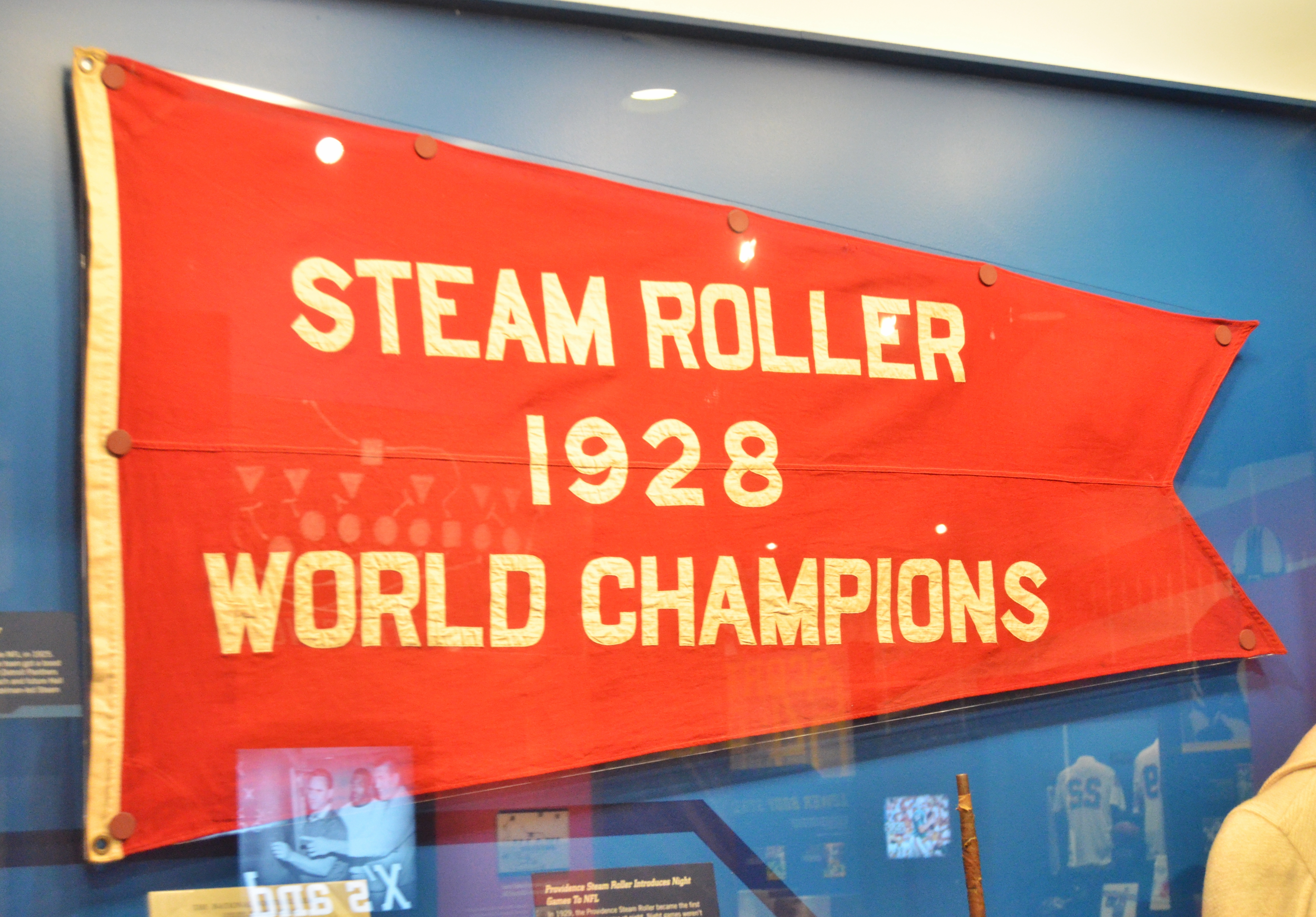
1928 World Champions pennant.

Providence opened its 1928 season against Red Grange and the New York Yankees, Wilson's rival from the AFL. The Steam Roller led the Yankees 20–7 at halftime and held that score throughout the second half. However, the team's next game resulted in a 10–6 loss to the Frankford Yellow Jackets. However, the team soon rebounded with a four-game winning streak over the Dayton Triangles (28–0), Yankees (12–6), Pottsville Maroons (13–6) and Detroit Wolverines (7–0). The Steam Roller faced the Yellow Jackets again at Frankford Stadium on November 17, which resulted in a scoreless tie. However a week later, at the Cycledrome, Providence finally avenged its only loss of the season with a 6–0 victory over the Yellow Jackets. The team then posted wins over the New York Giants (16–0) and Pottsville (7–0), before ending its season with a 7–7 tie against the Green Bay Packers. Providence was named the 1928 NFL Champions. Prior to the 1932 season, the NFL team with the best winning percentage was named the NFL Champions. Despite the Yellow Jackets winning 3 more games than the Steam Roller and posting an 11–3–2 record, Providence was awarded the title due to having a better winning percentage with an 8-1-2 season.

A victory banquet at the Biltmore Hotel took place a week later. At the banquet, each player was rewarded with a gold watch. It was also at this event that Conzelman was given a trophy and named the team's Most Valuable Player. Five of the Steam Roller's players gained All-NFL honors when the league issued its official honor roll on December 23. Wildcat Wilson and Clyde Smith were named to the first team, while Curly Oden, Milt Rehnquist, and Gus Sonnenberg were placed on the second team.

==== NFL firsts ====
Over the course of the next seven years, the team not only won an NFL championship but also established three league "firsts." In 1925, Providence was the first NFL team to play its home games in a bicycle racing stadium (a velodrome). In 1929, the Steam Roller established two NFL "firsts." In the six-day period between November 5 and November 10, 1929, Providence played four games. The marathon string began against the Staten Island Stapletons, the Chicago Cardinals and concluded with a two-game series against the Frankford Yellow Jackets. Although the Steam Roller made history, their 0–3–1 record during that six-day stretch proved to be a scheduling disaster. During the second game of that four-game series, Providence hosted the Cardinals on November 6. The game was played at night at nearby Kinsley Park, where floodlights recently had been installed. The teams had originally been scheduled to play on Sunday, November 3, but heavy rains made the Cycledrome field unplayable. Since neither team wanted to lose a payday, the historic night game was hastily scheduled. Because of this, Providence made history again by being the first team to host an NFL game at night under floodlights. Although the Steam Roller lost 16–0, the game was declared a success because 6,000 fans attended.

=== Decline ===
Despite their 1928 championship, the team experienced troubles in 1929. On January 4, 1929, Sonnenberg defeated Strangler Lewis in two straight falls to capture the world heavyweight championship in professional wrestling. This caused Sonnenberg to stay out of football, as he could make better money defending his title. Meanwhile, Oden quit pro football to take a job with an insurance company in Boston, and Smith decided to return to his native Missouri and coach football. Conzelman also didn't fully recover from a knee injury sustained in 1928. Rehnquist missed the first half of the season due to illness, and Wildcat Wilson became complacent and turned into an ordinary back. The 1929 Steam Roller team struggled to a 4–6–2 record, resulting in a 7th place league finish. The team then posted a 6–4–1 record in 1930 and a 4–4–3 record in 1931.

The lack of interest, too many road games where the home team retained most of the income and the Great Depression in 1930, caused Dooley, Coppen and Laudati to suspend operations after the 1931 season. The three owners then gave up and turned the franchise back over to the NFL in 1933.

== Name origin ==
During halftime of a game against Orient Heights, a team from East Boston and his Providence Professionals, Charles Coppen, who was getting a hot dog, heard a remark that the opposing team was "getting steam-rolled". Coppen loved the remark so much he changed the name of the team. Immediately after the 58-0 drubbing, the name Providence Steam Roller appeared in the pages of the Providence Journal.

== Other Steam Roller teams ==
A team known as the Providence Huskies (the Steam Roller had used a husky-like dog as their mascot, so this team may have been a continuation of or successor to the Steam Roller) played during the 1933 season. The Huskies earned a perfect season, the only season in the professional or semi-professional record books to have not allowed their opponents to score a single point over an entire season. In 1936 an unrelated Providence Steam Roller team played in the New England Football League for one season.

The Steam Roller name was revived by Pearce Johnson, one of the original team's founders. The subsequent Steamrollers played on a near-continuous basis since that point as a semi-pro, minor league, and independent team until 1942, when it moved to Springfield and became the Springfield Steamroller for 1943, and suspended operations shortly thereafter. The last three seasons of a "Providence Steamrollers" team were as a member of the Atlantic Coast Football League; in 1962, the Steamroller team was the league's runner-up, losing in the championship to the Paterson Miners in a double-overtime decision. The assets of the ACFL Steam Roller were bought and taken to the Continental Football League as the Rhode Island Indians, where the team played one last season in 1965. After the 1965 season, the team's franchise rights were turned over to famed baseball player Jackie Robinson and became the "Brooklyn Dodgers," which lasted one season; for 1966, the Rhode Island Steelers would take the Steamroller's place in the ACFL and in Providence.

A Basketball Association of America franchise was named the Providence Steamrollers. The Steamrollers played for three seasons, beginning in 1946–1947.

The name was revived again in 1988 for an Arena Football League team, the New England Steamrollers.

A rare home movie showing the Providence Steamrollers playing the Framingham Lion Tamers was recently discovered and preserved by Northeast Historic Film, a regional moving image archive in New England.

== Pro Football Hall of Famers ==
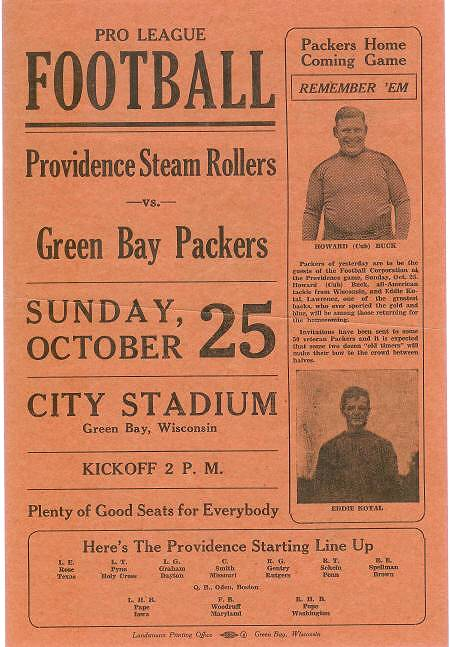
1931 program between the "Steam Roller" and Green Bay Packers

Providence Steam Roller Hall of Famers
Players
No.	Name	Position	Tenure	Inducted
1	Jimmy Conzelman	HB/QB; Coach	1927–1929	1964
—	Fritz Pollard	HB	1925	2005

== Season-by-season ==
Year	W	L	T	Finish	Coach
1924	12	3	1	–	Joe Braney
1925	6	5	1	10th	Archie Golembeski
1926	5	7	1	11th	Jim Laird
1927	8	5	1	5th	Jimmy Conzelman
1928	8	1	2	1st	Jimmy Conzelman
1929	4	6	2	8th	Jimmy Conzelman
1930	6	4	1	5th	Jimmy Conzelman
1931	4	4	3	6th	Ed Robinson
