= All-time rosters by defunct NFL franchises (Milwaukee Badgers–Washington Senators) =

This is a list of players who have appeared in at least one regular season or postseason game for defunct National Football League (NFL) or All-America Football Conference (AAFC) franchises. This list contains franchises sorted alphabetically from "New York Brickley Giants" to "Washington Senators". For the rest of the franchises, see all-time rosters by defunct NFL franchises (Akron Indians/Pros–Cleveland Indians/Bulldogs) and (Cleveland Tigers/Indians–Miami Seahawks).

== Milwaukee Badgers ==
- Fred Abel
- John Alexander
- Norris Armstrong
- Roger Ashmore
- Adrian Baril
- Shorty Barr
- Norman Barry
- Sid Bennett
- Lyle Bigbee
- Russ Blailock
- Roman Brumm
- Johnny Bryan
- Joe Burks
- Moose Cochran
- Bill Collins
- Jimmy Conzelman
- Charlie Copley
- Donald Curtin
- Jack Daniels
- Darroll DeLaPorte
- LaVern Dilweg
- Dinger Doane
- John Dooley
- Steve Douglas
- Jim Dufft
- Red Dunn
- Pat Dunnigan
- Hal Erickson
- John Fahay
- Mickey Fallon
- Clarke Fischer
- Bob Foster
- Budge Garrett
- Chet Gay
- Hank Gillo
- Al Greene
- Stone Hallquist
- Johnny Heimsch
- Frank Hertz
- Frank Jordan
- Emmett Keefe
- Dick King
- Stan Kuick
- Oxie Lane
- Ojay Larson
- Walt LeJeune
- Sam Mason
- Marv Mattox
- Larry McGinnis
- Bo McMillin
- Johnny "Blood" McNally
- Ward Meese
- Heinie Miller
- Johnny Milton
- George Mooney
- Frank Morrissey
- Tom Murphy
- Peaches Nadolney
- Clem Neacy
- Ossie Orwoll
- Al Pierotti
- Fritz Pollard
- Earl Potteiger
- Mike Purdy
- Ed Rate
- Dick Reichle
- Chuck Reichow
- Charlie Richardson
- Paul Robeson
- Fritz Roeseler
- Bill Ryan
- Frank Rydzewski
- Lenny Sachs
- George Seasholtz
- Duke Slater
- Howie Slater
- Russ Smith
- Jim Snyder
- Bill Strickland
- Steve Sullivan
- Evar Swanson
- Bill Thompson
- Festus Tierney
- Tommy Tomlin
- Barney Traynor
- Jim Turner
- John Underwood
- Lou Usher
- Roy Vassau
- Art Webb
- Bub Weller
- Ad Wenke
- Chet Widerquist
- Ben Winkelman

== Minneapolis Marines/Red Jackets ==
- Adrian Baril
- Nate Barragar
- Bill Capps
- Joseph Chrape
- Oscar Christianson
- Ainer Cleve
- Jack Corcoran
- Danny Coughlin
- Clyde Crabtree
- Paul Des Jardien
- Pat Dunnigan
- Ben Dvorak
- Beanie Eberts
- E. Erickson
- Hal Erickson
- Harold Erickson
- John Fahay
- Paul Flinn
- Bob Fosdick
- Herb Franta
- Frank Gause
- Dutch Gaustad
- George Gibson
- Royce Goodbread
- Harry Gunderson
- Ed Halicki
- Hal Hanson (born 1895)
- Hal Hanson (born 1905)
- Ken Haycraft
- Tom Hogan
- Murrell Hogue
- Bill Houle
- Dick Hudson
- Bill Irgens
- Herb Joesting
- Ed Johns
- Charlie Jonasen
- Potsy Jones
- Ike Kakela
- Ave Kaplan
- Tony Kostos
- Reynold Kraft
- George Kramer
- Fritz Loven
- Bob Lundell
- Ladue Lurth
- John Madigan
- Al Maeder
- Roger Mahoney
- Sam Mason
- Joe Mattern
- Tony Mehelich
- Harry Mehre
- Verne Miller
- Louie Mohs
- Ted Nemzek
- John Norbeck
- Marty Norton
- Eddie Novak
- Mally Nydall
- Ben Oas
- Jack O'Brien
- Louie Pahl
- Mike Palmer
- Oran Pape
- Jim Pederson
- Art Pharmer
- Fred Putzier
- Sheepy Redeen
- Pete Regnier
- Kelly Rodriguez
- Eber Sampson
- Artie Sandberg
- Les Scott
- Herman Seborg
- John Simons
- Tony Steponovich
- Cookie Tackwell
- Rudy Tersch
- Festus Tierney
- Otto Townsend
- Hal Truesdell
- Rube Ursella
- Johnny Ward
- Gordon Watkins
- Chet Widerquist
- Henry Willegale
- Lee Wilson
- Lloyd Young

== Muncie Flyers ==
- Cliff Baldwin
- Bobby Berns
- Cooney Checkaye
- Doc Davis
- Arch Erehart
- Owen Floyd
- Ken Fulton
- Russ Hathaway
- Chuck Helvie
- Babe Hole
- Mickey Hole
- Ken Huffine
- Kellogg
- Doc LaDuron
- Ray MacMurray
- Mac McIndoe
- Spencer Pope
- Gus Redman
- Jess Reno
- Pete Slone
- Wilfred Smith
- Mike Yount

== New York Brickley Giants ==
- Joe Bernstein
- Ed Brawley
- George Brickley
- Harrie Dadmun
- Mark Devlin
- Dinger Doane
- Jim Dufft
- Joe DuSossoit
- Tom Gormley
- Doc Haggerty
- Jimmy Jemail
- George Kane
- George Kerr
- Frank Leavitt
- Buck MacDonald
- Al Maginnes
- Dave Maginnes
- Paul Meyers
- Johnny Nagle
- Jerry Noonan
- Con O'Brien
- Ed O'Hearn
- Al Pierotti
- Mike Purdy
- Fred Sweetland
- Ray Trowbridge

== New York Yankees (NFL) ==
- Red Badgro
- Bullet Baker
- John Bayley
- Bob Beattie
- Jack Colahan
- Mush Crawford
- Hec Cyre
- Jug Earp
- Jack Ernst
- Ray Flaherty
- Wesley Fry
- Edward B. Gallagher
- Red Grange
- Frank Grube
- Dick Hall
- Norm Harvey
- Murrell Hogue
- Bill Kelly
- Louis Kolls
- Fritz Kramer
- Jim Lawson
- Harvey Levy
- Verne Lewellen
- Red Maloney
- Larry Marks
- Jack McArthur
- Frank McGrath
- Joe McLain
- Mike Michalske
- Bo Molenda
- Bill Oliver
- Forrest Olson
- Bill Pritchard
- Frank Racis
- Dick Rauch
- Cobb Rooney
- Sam Salemi
- Ralph Scott
- Red Smith
- Ray Stephens
- Art Stevenson
- Eddie Tryon
- Gibby Welch

== New York Yankees (AAFC) ==
- Bruce Alford
- Ed Balatti
- Jack Baldwin
- Dick Barwegan
- Roman Bentz
- George Brown
- Harry Burrus
- Carl Butkus
- Fred Cardinal
- Tom Casey
- Bill Chambers
- Lloyd Cheatham
- Paul Cleary
- Mickey Colmer
- Mel Conger
- Denny Crawford
- Bill Daley
- Van Davis
- Al Dekdebrun
- George Doherty
- Noble Doss
- Paul Duke
- Jack Durishan
- Brad Ecklund
- Charlie Elliott
- Bill Erickson
- Dan Garza
- Mike Garzoni
- Ed Grain
- Nelson Greene
- Ray Hare
- Sherman Howard
- Duke Iversen
- Gil Johnson
- Glenn Johnson
- Harvey Johnson
- Nate Johnson
- Mike Karmazin
- Bob Kennedy
- Bruiser Kinard
- George Kinard
- Roy Kurrasch
- Lou Kusserow
- Tom Landry
- Clayton Lane
- Pete Layden
- Joe Magliolo
- Pug Manders
- Bob Masterson
- John Mastrangelo
- Harley McCollum
- Flip McDonald
- Paul Mitchell
- Bob Morrow
- Roland Nabors
- Ted Ossowski
- Derrell Palmer
- Don Panciera
- Ace Parker
- Howie Parker
- Frank Perantoni
- Bob Perina
- Roman Piskor
- Barney Poole
- Ollie Poole
- Dewey Proctor
- Eddie Prokop
- Ben Raimondi
- Charley Riffle
- Tom Robertson
- John Rokisky
- Harmon Rowe
- Martin Ruby
- Roy Ruskusky
- Jack Russell
- Spec Sanders
- Vic Schleich
- Otto Schnellbacher
- Perry Schwartz
- Bud Schwenk
- Ed Sharkey
- Marion Shirley
- Stephen Sieradzki
- Joe Signaigo
- Frankie Sinkwich
- Lou Sossamon
- Henry Stanton
- Ralph Stewart
- Bob Sweiger
- John Sylvester
- Lowell Tew
- Lowell Wagner
- Arnie Weinmeister
- Dick Werder
- John Wozniak
- Joe Yackanich
- Buddy Young

== New York Bulldogs/Yanks ==
- Joe Abbey
- Chet Adams
- Ben Aldridge
- Bruce Alford Sr.
- Sisto Averno
- Fritz Barzilauskas
- Stan Batinski
- Tom Blake
- Mike Boyda
- George Brown
- Bill Campbell
- Jim Canady
- Bob Celeri
- Jim Champion
- Bill Chipley
- Johnny Clowes
- Don Colo
- Paul Crowe
- Jim Cullom
- Bob DeMoss
- Joe Domnanovich
- Art Donovan
- Brad Ecklund
- Dan Edwards
- Herb Ellis
- Dan Garza
- Frank Gaul
- Joe Golding
- Bobbie Griffin
- Roger Harding
- Ralph Heywood
- Sherman Howard
- Duke Iversen
- Mike Jarmoluk
- Jon Jenkins
- Harvey Johnson
- Nate Johnson
- Bob Kennedy
- Lou Kusserow
- Pete Layden
- Bobby Layne
- Mike McCormack
- Darrel Meisenheimer
- Paul Mitchell
- Frank Muehlheuser
- Ross Nagel
- Frank Nelson
- John Nolan
- Bill O'Connor
- Larry Olsonoski
- Joe Osmanski
- Al Pollard
- Barney Poole
- Merv Pregulman
- Hal Prescott
- Steve Pritko
- George Ratterman
- John Rauch
- George Roman
- Martin Ruby
- Jack Russell
- Joe Sabasteanski
- Spec Sanders
- Nick Scollard
- Dean Sensanbaugher
- Ed Sharkey
- Paul Shoults
- Wayne Siegert
- Joe Signaigo
- Phil Slosburg
- Ed Smith
- Joe Soboleski
- Bob Sponaugle
- James Stroschein
- Mike Swistowicz
- Art Tait
- George Taliaferro
- Sam Tamburo
- Zollie Toth
- Carroll Vogelaar
- Jim Wade
- Bev Wallace
- Joe Watt
- John Weaver
- Art Weiner
- John Wozniak
- John Yonakor
- Buddy Young

== Oorang Indians ==
- Arrowhead
- Reggie Attache
- Napoleon Barrel
- Big Bear
- Peter Blackbear
- Alex Bobidosh
- Lo Boutwell
- Fred Broker
- Henry Broker
- Ted Buffalo
- Elmer Busch
- Pete Calac
- Dick Deer Slayer
- Xavier Downwind
- War Eagle
- Eagle Feather
- Joe Guyon
- Bob Hill
- Gray Horse
- Al Jolley
- Buck Jones
- Nick Lassa
- Chim Lingrel
- Joe Little Twig
- Ted Lone Wolf
- Emmett McLemore
- Jack Nason
- Bill Newashe
- Joe Pappio
- Stan Powell
- Stillwell Saunooke
- Ted St. Germaine
- Jack Thorpe
- Jim Thorpe
- Baptiste Thunder
- Woodchuck Welmas
- Bill Winneshiek

== Orange/Newark Tornadoes ==
- Teddy Andrulewicz
- Ralph Barkman
- Bob Beattie
- Heinie Benkert
- George Bogue
- Nick Borelli
- Peter Bove
- Phil Brennan
- Frank Briante
- Stu Clancy
- Bill Clarkin
- Bill Connor
- Sam Cordovano
- Ernest Cuneo
- Joe Davidson
- Jack Depler
- John Dibb
- Bob Dwyer
- Bud Ellor
- Bill Feaster
- Bernie Finn
- Paul Frank
- Les Grace
- Steven Hamas
- Ernie Hambacher
- Ken Hauser
- Leon Johnson
- Bruce Jones
- Tex Kelly
- Tom Kerrigan
- Frank Kirkleski
- John Law
- Tom Leary
- Paul Liston
- Paul Longua
- Edson Lott
- Eddie Lynch
- Tony Manfreda
- Hersh Martin
- Jack McArthur
- Felix McCormick
- Harry McGee
- Ted Mitchell
- Jim Mooney
- Harry Myles
- George Pease
- Andy Salata
- Phil Scott
- Sam Sebo
- Don Smith
- Red Smith
- Jimmy Tays
- Johnny Tomaini
- Charlie Van Horn
- Ray Wagner
- Carl Waite
- Dutch Webber
- Ernie Woerner

== Pottsville Maroons/Boston Bulldogs ==
- John Barrett
- Clarence Beck
- Heinie Benkert
- Charlie Berry
- Jesse Brown
- Frank Bucher
- Johnny Budd
- Joe Carpe
- Harlan Carr
- Les Caywood
- Bill Connor
- Harry Dayhoff
- Dinger Doane
- Eddie Doyle
- Walden Erickson
- Jack Ernst
- Nick Farina
- Hoot Flanagan
- Adrian Ford
- Walter French
- Earl Goodwin
- Myrl Goodwin
- Russ Hathaway
- Pete Henry
- Bill Howell
- Denny Hughes
- Vivian Hultman
- Heinie Jawish
- George Kenneally
- Walt Kiesling
- Frank Kirkleski
- Paul Kitteredge
- Joe Kozlowsky
- Tony Latone
- Ed Lawrence
- Fungy Lebengood
- Walt LeJeune
- Armin Mahrt
- Red Maloney
- Ralph Marston
- Emil Mayer
- Ed McCrillis
- Johnny "Blood" McNally
- Al Miller
- Bob Millman
- Dinty Moore
- Hap Moran
- Vern Mullen
- Fanny Niehaus
- Will Norman
- Aaron Oliker
- Duke Osborn
- Al Pierotti
- Frank Racis
- Dick Rauch
- Paul Rebsamen
- Guy Roberts
- Joe Rooney
- Ed Sauer
- Eddie Scharer
- Roy Scholl
- Arnie Shockley
- Bert Shurtleff
- Herb Stein
- Russ Stein
- Hust Stockton
- Thurston Towle
- Jack Underwood
- Jim Welsh
- Cy Wentworth
- Barney Wentz
- Zeke Wissinger
- Frank Youngfleish

== Providence Steam Roller ==
- Sky August
- Speed Braney
- Chick Burke
- Dutch Connor
- Jimmy Conzelman
- Bill Cronin
- Jack Cronin
- Jim Crowley
- Fred DaGata
- Dinger Doane
- Jack Donahue
- Forrest Douds
- Dolph Eckstein
- Bud Edwards
- Herb Eschbach
- Carl Etelman
- Jack Fleischman
- Dutch Forst
- Art Garvey
- Franny Garvey
- Weldon Gentry
- Archie Golembeski
- Royce Goodbread
- Al Graham
- Fred Graham
- Mike Gulian
- Al Hadden
- Vern Hagenbuckle
- Ching Hammill
- Frank Hanny
- Norm Harvey
- Tony Holm
- Swede Hummell
- Tex Irvin
- Perry Jackson
- Lou Jennings
- Jackson Keefer
- Lou Koplow
- Joe Kozlowsky
- Ted Kucharski
- Jim Laird
- Tony Latone
- Pinky Lester
- Bull Lowe
- Eddie Lynch
- Waddy MacPhee
- Red Maloney
- Jim Manning
- Jack McArthur
- Jack McBride
- Ed McCrillis
- Joe McGlone
- Hugh McGoldrick
- Warren McGuirk
- Al McIntosh
- Butch Meeker
- Don Miller
- Dave Mishel
- Grat O'Connell
- Curly Oden
- Oran Pape
- Pard Pearce
- Frosty Peters
- Al Pierotti
- John Pohlman
- Fritz Pollard
- Lew Pope
- Bill Pritchard
- George Pyne II
- Frank Racis
- Milt Rehnquist
- Hop Riopel
- Al Rose
- Seneca Samson
- Joe Schein
- Bob Scott
- Frank Seyboth
- Nate Share
- Fred Sheehan
- Deck Shelley
- Bert Shurtleff
- Jim Simmons
- Clyde Smith
- Orland Smith
- Ray Smith
- Lou Smyth
- Alec Sofish
- Gus Sonnenberg
- Jack Spellman
- Spike Staff
- Jim Stifler
- Hust Stockton
- Fred Sweet
- John Talbot
- John Thomas
- Herb Titmas
- Jack Triggs
- Dutch Webber
- Gibby Welch
- Cy Wentworth
- Bull Wesley
- Pop Williams
- Abe Wilson
- Wildcat Wilson
- Lee Woodruff
- Herm Young
- Lloyd Young
- Sam Young

== Racine Legion/Tornadoes ==
- Shorty Barr
- A.C. Bauer
- Buddy Baumann
- Jimmy Baxter
- Al Bentzin
- George Bernard
- George Berry
- Adolph Bieberstein
- Champ Boettcher
- Art Braman
- Roman Brumm
- George Burnside
- Lee Croft
- Donald Curtin
- Moxie Dalton
- Chuck Dressen
- Al Elliott
- John Fahay
- Bob Foster
- Karl George
- Bill Giaver
- Hank Gillo
- George Glennie
- Norm Glockson
- Earl Gorman
- Death Halladay
- Dick Hanley
- Richard Hardy
- George Hartong
- Norbert Hayes
- Fritz Heinisch
- Fred Hobscheid
- Jack Hueller
- Jerry Johnson
- Graham Kernwein
- Ralph King
- Irv Langhoff
- Frank Linnan
- Roy Longstreet
- Barney Mathews
- Bill McCaw
- George McGill
- Wally McIlwain
- Paul Meyers
- Candy Miller
- Jack Mintun
- John Mohardt
- Jim Murphy
- Jab Murray
- Don Murry
- Jim Oldham
- Chuck Palmer
- Dudley Pearson
- Al Pierotti
- Chuck Reichow
- Elmer Rhenstrom
- Riley
- Fritz Roeseler
- Milt Romney
- Vincent Shekleton
- Wally Sieb
- Len Smith
- Ed Sparr
- Howard Stark
- Gil Sterr
- John Thomas
- Rollie Williams
- Whitey Woodin

== Rochester Jeffersons ==
- Doc Alexander
- Eddie Anderson
- Will Anderson
- Bob Argus
- Joe Bachmaier
- Hugh Bancroft
- Jim Barron
- John Barsha
- Reaves Baysinger
- Gene Bedford
- Benton
- Eddie Benz
- Howard Berry
- Benny Boynton
- Denny Cahill
- Bart Carroll
- Babe Clark
- Hal Clark
- Fred Clarke
- Ben Clime
- John Coaker
- Bill Connell
- Ham Connors
- Frank Culver
- John Dooley
- Jim Dufft
- Joe DuMoe
- Red Emslie
- Bill Erwig
- Earl Ettenhaus
- Guil Falcon
- Ben Forsyth
- Fred Foster
- Walter French
- Walt Frickey
- Mike Gavagan
- Tex Grigg
- John Hasbrouck
- Pete Heinlein
- Ralph Henricus
- Jake Hoffman
- Dutch Irwin
- Jim Kane
- Cy Kasper
- Bill Kellogg
- Tex Kelly
- Jim Kendrick
- Dick King
- John Kvist
- Jim Laird
- Chris Lehrer
- Jim Leonard
- Darby Lowery
- Eddie Lynch
- Roy Mackert
- Roy Martineau
- Frank Matteo
- Joe McShea
- Dutch Mellody
- Paul Meyers
- Pop Morrison
- Frank Morrissey
- Bob Nash
- Nielson
- Jerry Noonan
- Clem Nugent
- Elmer Oliphant
- Red Pearlman
- Pepper
- Leo Peyton
- Mike Purdy
- Red Quigley
- Billy Rafter
- Harry Robertson
- Spin Roy
- Bill Ryan
- Herm Sawyer
- Shag Sheard
- Hank Smith
- Lou Smyth
- Cliff Steele
- Charlie Stewart
- George Tandy
- Carl Thomas
- Vern Thomas
- Tiny Thompson
- Tiney
- Lou Usher
- Elmer Volgenau
- Gordon Wallace
- Art Webb
- Jim Welsh
- Larry Weltman
- Frank Whitcomb
- Mike Wilson
- Ray Witter
- Jimmy Woods
- Chet Wynne
- Dave Ziff

== Rock Island Independents ==
- Paul Anderson
- Johnny Armstrong
- Bill Ashbaugh
- Dick Barker
- Les Belding
- Joe Bernstein
- Wes Bradshaw
- Lane Bridgford
- Walt Brindley
- Walt Buland
- Lyle Burton
- Sol Butler
- Mike Casteel
- Fred Chicken
- Walt Clago
- Jimmy Conzelman
- Forrest Cotton
- Frank Coughlin
- George Dahlgren
- Frank DeClerk
- Fred Denfeld
- Mark Devlin
- Eddie Duggan
- Jug Earp
- Freeman Fitzgerald
- Frank Garden
- Buck Gavin
- Bill Giaver
- Alex Gorgal
- Harry Gunderson
- Joe Guyon
- Harry Hall
- Hal Hanson
- John Hasbrouck
- Dave Hayes
- Ed Healey
- Dutch Hendrian
- Tom Henry
- Ed Herman
- Chuck Hill
- Jerry Johnson
- Jerry Jones
- Frank Jordan
- Max Kadesky
- Emmett Keefe
- Jim Kendrick
- Polly Koch
- Louis Kolls
- Ollie Kraehe
- Joe Kraker
- Waddy Kuehl
- Roddy Lamb
- Dutch Lauer
- Joe Little Twig
- Walter Lowe
- Charlie Lungren
- Dewey Lyle
- George Magerkurth
- Grover Malone
- Jerry Mansfield
- Bobby Marshall
- Vince McCarthy
- Vic Menefee
- Charlie Mockmore
- Sid Nichols
- Eddie Novak
- Bob Phelan
- Paddy Quinn
- Speed Riddell
- Loyal Robb
- Joe Rooney
- Ned Scott
- Ed Shaw
- Herb Sies
- Duke Slater
- Hank Smith
- Oak Smith
- Basil Stanley
- Sullivan
- Evar Swanson
- John Synhorst
- George Thompson
- Fred Thomsen
- Jim Thorpe
- Brick Travis
- Rube Ursella
- Eddie Usher
- Viv Vanderloo
- Tillie Voss
- Harry Webber
- Obe Wenig
- Chet Widerquist
- Mike Wilson
- Pudge Wyland
- Arnie Wyman

== St. Louis All-Stars ==
- LeRoy Andrews
- John Cardwell
- Pete Casey
- James Finnegan
- Dolly Gray impostor
- Dick King
- Ollie Kraehe
- Walt Kreinheder
- Ward Meese
- George Meinhardt
- Johnny Milton
- William Murrah
- Orville Siegfried
- Eber Simpson
- Brick Travis
- Bub Weller
- Hal Wilder
- Ernie Winburn
- Lee Wykoff

== St. Louis Gunners ==
- Gene Alford
- Jaby Andrews
- Cy Casper
- Red Corzine
- Charlie Diehl
- Earl Elser
- Mack Gladden
- Swede Johnston
- Benny LaPresta
- Russ Lay
- Babe Lyon
- Len McGirl
- Charlie McLaughlin
- Russ McLeod
- Bill Montgomery
- Paul Moss
- Lee Mulleneaux
- George Munday
- John Norby
- Manny Rapp
- Homer Reynolds
- George Rogge
- Sandy Sandberg
- Bill Senn
- Harold Weldin
- Blake Workman

== Staten Island Stapletons ==
- Julie Archoska
- Bullet Baker
- Bob Barrabee
- Frank Briante
- Fred Brown
- Ralph Buckley
- John Bunyan
- Bob Campiglio
- Stu Clancy
- Ed Comstock
- Rick Concannon
- Irv Constantine
- Cookie Cunningham
- George Demas
- John Demmy
- Bob Dunn
- Tiny Feather
- Bernie Finn
- Jim Fitzgerald
- Beryl Follet
- Dick Frahm
- Harry Fry
- Art Garvey
- Walt Godwin
- Rosie Grant
- Hinkey Haines
- Hoot Haines
- Willie Halpern
- Swede Hanson
- Les Hart
- Wilbur Henry
- Grassy Hinton
- Marne Intrieri
- Jim Kamp
- Al Kanya
- Harry Kloppenberg
- Art Koeninger
- Paul Kuczo
- Jim Laird
- Ed Lawrence
- Tom Leary
- Doc Ledbetter
- Tom Lomasney
- Jack Lord
- Bob Lundell
- Charley Marshall
- Hersh Martin
- Les Maynard
- Harry McGee
- Mayes McLain
- Bing Miller
- Dave Myers
- Jim Nicely
- Jack Norris
- Henry Obst
- Oran Pape
- Doc Parkinson
- Louie Pessolano
- Les Peterson
- Herb Rapp
- Leo Raskowski
- Vic Reuter
- Mike Riordan
- Jack Roberts
- Ollie Satenstein
- Art Schiebel
- Ray Schwab
- Jack Shapiro
- Dave Skudin
- Snitz Snyder
- Sammy Stein
- Mike Stramiello
- Ken Strong
- Erk Taylor
- Jimmy Tays
- Al Teeter
- Bill Wexler
- Firpo Wilcox
- Basil Wilkerson
- Cy Williams
- Ike Williams
- Mule Wilson
- Stu Wilson
- Doug Wycoff
- Izzy Yablock

== Toledo Maroons ==
- Dunc Annan
- Don Batchelor
- Al Burgin
- Marty Conrad
- Cap Edwards
- Guil Falcon
- France Fitzgerald
- Joe Gillis
- Hippo Gozdowski
- Cowboy Hill
- Tom Holleran
- Steamer Horning
- Ben Hunt
- Cliff Jetmore
- Jerry Jones
- Reno Jones
- John Kellison
- Tex Kelly
- Jim Kendrick
- Gus King
- Heinie Kirkgard
- Dutch Lauer
- Tom McNamara
- Truck Myers
- Chuck O'Neil
- Dwight Peabody
- Leo Petree
- Bob Phelan
- Red Roberts
- Tubby Roush
- Buck Saunders
- Si Seyfrit
- Jimmy Simpson
- Herb Stein
- Russ Stein
- Dutch Strauss
- John Tanner
- Festus Tierney
- Tillie Voss
- Rat Watson
- Mac White

== Tonawanda Kardex ==
- Backnor
- Fred Brumm
- Cassidy
- Art Goerke
- Clarence Hosmer
- Rudy Kraft
- George Kuhrt
- Buck MacDonald
- Tom McLaughlin
- Bill Meisner
- Frank Primeau
- Tam Rose
- Bill Sanborn
- Charlie Tallman
- Red Werder

== Washington Senators ==
- Dan Ahern
- Alec Anderson
- George Beyers
- Johnny Bleier
- Benny Boynton
- Pete Calac
- Joe Coster
- Billy Crouch
- Perry Dowrick
- Patsy Gerardi
- Johnny Gilroy
- Tom Gormley
- Joe Guyon
- Johnnie Hudson
- Sam Kaplan
- Dutch Leighty
- Red Litkus
- Mickey Livers
- Don McCarthy
- Cy McDonald
- Gordon Patterson
- Metz Smeach
- Jack Sullivan
- Buff Turner
- Sam Turner
- Pong Unitas
- Ed Van Meter
- Gene Vidal
- Bullets Walson
