= Gordon Wallace =

Gordon Wallace may refer to:

- Gordon Wallace (judge) (1900–1987), first President of the New South Wales Court of Appeal
- Gordon Wallace (boxer) (1929–2015), Canadian boxer of the 1950s
- Gordon Wallace (footballer, born 1943) (1943–2026), Scottish football player and manager (Dundee, Dundee United, Raith Rovers)
- Gordon Wallace (footballer, born 1944), Scottish football player (Liverpool)
- Gordon Wallace (footballer, born 1949) (1949–2023), Scottish football player (Raith Rovers, Dundee United)
- Gordon Wallace (soccer) (born 1955), Scottish-born Canadian international soccer player
- Gordon Wallace (professor) (born 1958), scientist in the field of electromaterials
- Gordon Wallace (American football) (1899–1931)
