= Clarke Fischer =

American football player (1900–1979)

Profile
- Position: Halfback

Personal information
- Born: March 30, 1900; Hermansville, Michigan, U.S.
- Died: October 21, 1979 (aged 79); Pana, Illinois, U.S.
- Listed height: 5 ft 8 in (1.73 m)
- Listed weight: 165 lb (75 kg)

Career information
- High school: Marquette (WI)
- College: Marquette; Campion; Catholic

Career history
- Milwaukee Badgers (1926)

Career NFL statistics
- Games played: 2
- Stats at Pro Football Reference

Clarke John Fischer (March 30, 1900 – October 21, 1979) was a player in the National Football League.

== Biography ==
Clarke John Fischer was born on March 30, 1900, in Hermansville, Michigan. He attended high school in Milwaukee, Wisconsin. He died in Pana, Illinois, on October 21, 1979.

== Career ==
Fischer played with the Milwaukee Badgers during the 1926 NFL season as a halfback. Prior to the NFL, he played collegiately at The Catholic University of America and Marquette University.

== See also ==
- List of Milwaukee Badgers players
