= Stu Wilson (American football) =

American football player (1905–1963)

William Stuart Wilson, Jr.
Personal information
- Born: March 31, 1905
- Died: December 1963 (aged 58)
- Listed height: 6 ft 2 in (1.88 m)
- Listed weight: 209 lb (95 kg)

Career information
- College: Washington & Jefferson College

Career history
- Staten Island Stapletons (1932)
- Stats at Pro Football Reference

William Stuart Wilson Jr. was an American professional football player for the Staten Island Stapletons in the National Football League. He attended Washington & Jefferson College.

== Notes ==
- Career statistics from NFL.com · Pro Football Reference ·
