= Anthony Manfreda =

American football player (1904–1988)

Anthony Richard Manfreda (February 19, 1904 – October 9, 1988) was an American football halfback. He holds the Holy Cross record for most yards gained (100 against Boston University in 1929) on a kickoff return. He played high school football for Sanborn Seminary in Kingston, New Hampshire. He also played in the National Football League (NFL) for the Newark Tornadoes (2 games in 1930). He was born in Meriden, Connecticut.
