= Verne Miller (American football) =

American football player (1908–1982)

Profile
- Position: Halfback

Personal information
- Born: May 11, 1908; Grand Rapids, Michigan
- Died: October 8, 1982 (aged 74); Milltown, Wisconsin
- Listed height: 6 ft 4 in (1.93 m)
- Listed weight: 215 lb (98 kg)

Career information
- College: Carleton, St. Mary's (MN)

Career history
- Minneapolis Red Jackets (1930)
- Stats at Pro Football Reference

Verne L. Miller (May 11, 1908 – October 8, 1982) was an American football player. He played college football for Carleton and St. Mary's (MN) and in the National Football League (NFL) as a halfback for the Minneapolis Red Jackets (1930). He appeared in five NFL games, two as a starter.
