= Jim Dufft =

American football player (1896–1960)

Profile
- Positions: Guard, tackle

Personal information
- Born: June 25, 1896; New York, New York, U.S.
- Died: May 28, 1960 (aged 63); Florida, U.S.
- Listed height: 6 ft 6 in (1.98 m)
- Listed weight: 250 lb (113 kg)

Career information
- High school: Kelvin School (Mount Vernon, New York)
- College: Fordham; Rutgers

Career history
- New York Brickley Giants (1921); Rochester Jeffersons (1921); Milwaukee Badgers (1922)

Career NFL statistics
- Games played: 10
- Stats at Pro Football Reference

James Henry Dufft (June 25, 1896 – May 28, 1960) was an American football player. He played professionally in the National Football League (NFL) with the Rochester Jeffersons, New York Brickley Giants and the Milwaukee Badgers. Brickley's New York Giants are not related to the modern-day New York Giants. Prior to joining the NFL, Dufft played college football at Fordham University and Rutgers University.

Dufft coached the football team at Mount Vernon High School in Mount Vernon, New York. In 1923, he married Helen Snyder and was engaged in business in New York City as the time.

Dufft moved from Waco, Texas to Orlando, Florida in 1956. The later lived in Eau Gallie, Florida and worked as a production specialist at Patrick Air Force Base. Dufft died on May 28, 1960.
