= Jack Lord (American football) =

American football player (1904–1958)

Personal information
- Born: September 23, 1904; Avon, New Jersey, U.S.
- Died: March 11, 1958 (aged 53); Rye, New York, U.S.
- Listed height: 6 ft 0 in (1.83 m)
- Listed weight: 195 lb (88 kg)

Career information
- College: Rutgers

Career history
- Staten Island Stapletons (1929)

John Warner Lord (September 23, 1904 – March 11, 1958) was an American football player.

Lord was born in Avon, New Jersey, in 1904. He attended Erasmus Hall High School in Brooklyn. He was captain of the Erasmus football team in 1923. He enrolled at Rutgers University in 1924 and was captain of the freshman football team that fall. After sitting out the 1925 season due to ineligibility, he played for the 1926 Rutgers team. He also competed in baseball and swimming at Rutgers. In the fall of 1927, he left school to pursue a business career on Wall Street.

Lord also played professional football in the National Football League (NFL) for the Staten Island Stapletons. He appeared in eight NFL games, two as a starter, during the 1929 season.
