= J. W. Hinton =

American football player (1907–1944)

J. W. "Grassy" Hinton
Profile
- Position: Quarterback

Personal information
- Born: June 30, 1907; Texas, U.S.
- Died: December 10, 1944 (aged 37); Halmahera Island, Indonesia †

Career information
- College: Texas Christian

Career history
- 1932: Staten Island Stapletons

Awards and highlights
- TCU Lettermen's Association Hall of Fame (1974)

Other information
- Military career
- Allegiance: United States
- Rank: Lt. Colonel
- Conflicts: World War II

J. W. "Grassy" Hinton (June 30, 1907 – December 10, 1944) was an American professional football player who played quarterback for one season for the Staten Island Stapletons. Prior to his professional career, Hinton played college football at Texas Christian University. In 1930, he scored a touchdown inside Amon G. Carter Stadium against Arkansas. A member of the school's baseball team, Hinton was selected as the Horned Frogs' top outfielder for the 1932 season.

After the 1932 season, Hinton joined the United States Army Air Corps and became a pilot in 1934. When World War II began, he was a lieutenant colonel and training director at Fort Worth Army Air Field. In the Pacific theater, he flew a B-24 Liberator with the 372nd Bombardment Squadron at the time of his death in a crash on Halmahera Island on December 10, 1944. He is honored in the Football's Wartime Heroes display at the Pro Football Hall of Fame.
