= Ray Witter =

American football player (1896–1983)

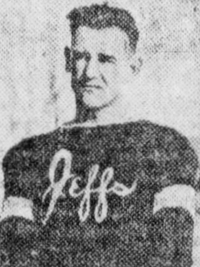

No. 11, 16, 4
- Position: End

Personal information
- Born: February 19, 1896; Perry, New York, U.S.
- Died: August 4, 1983 (aged 87); Batavia, New York, U.S.
- Listed height: 5 ft 10 in (1.78 m)
- Listed weight: 183 lb (83 kg)

Career information
- High school: Warsaw (Warsaw, New York)
- College: Syracuse, Alfred

Career history
- Rochester Jeffersons (1919–1923)
- Stats at Pro Football Reference

Ray Charles Witter (February 19, 1896 – August 4, 1983) was an American professional football end who played five seasons with the Rochester Jeffersons. He played college football at Syracuse University and Alfred University.

== Early life and college ==
Ray Charles Witter was born on February 19, 1896, in Perry, New York. He attended Warsaw High School in Warsaw, New York.

Witter played college football for the Syracuse Orange of Syracuse University from 1915 to 1916. He transferred to play for the Alfred Saxons of Alfred University in 1917. He was inducted into the Alfred University Sports Hall of Fame in 1974.

== Professional career ==
Witter played five seasons for the Rochester Jeffersons from 1919 to 1923. He once tackled Jim Thorpe in a game against the Canton Bulldogs. Witter played in one game in 1920, started five games in 1921, started one game in 1922, and played in three games (one start) in 1923. He stood 5'10" and weighed 183 pounds during his pro football career.

== Personal life ==
Witter served in the United States Navy. He died on August 4, 1973, in Batavia, New York.
