= Ed Travis =

American football player (1897–1982)

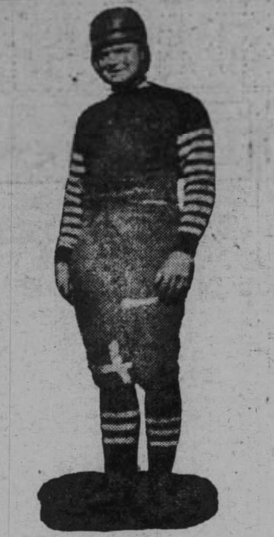
- Travis, c. 1921

Profile
- Position: Tackle

Personal information
- Born: September 17, 1897; Tarkio, Missouri, US
- Died: September 18, 1982 (aged 85); Chesterfield, Missouri, US
- Listed height: 6 ft 1 in (1.85 m)
- Listed weight: 205 lb (93 kg)

Career information
- High school: Tarkio (MO)
- College: Missouri

Career history
- Rock Island Independents (1921); St. Louis All-Stars (1923)

Career NFL statistics
- Games played: 12
- Games started: 11
- Stats at Pro Football Reference
- College Football Hall of Fame

James Edward "Brick" Travis II (September 17, 1897 – September 18, 1982) was an American football player. An All-Missouri Valley Conference member for the University of Missouri in 1919 and 1920, Travis was nicknamed "Brick" and played in twelve professional games over two seasons for the Rock Island Independents in 1921 and the St. Louis All-Stars in 1923. After his professional career, he opened the Travis Service Co. Buick Agency in St. Charles, Missouri and served in various civic roles in the state. He was elected to the College Football Hall of Fame in 1974.

== Biography ==
James Edward "Brick" Travis II was born in Tarkio, Missouri, on September 17, 1897. Growing up in Tarkio, Travis played American football for Tarkio High School. He wanted to play for the University of Missouri Tigers, but did not impress recruiters for the university. Instead, Travis opted to attend Tarkio College, where he played football for one season before transferring to Missouri; before he could do so, Travis served in World War I, where he became a first or second lieutenant. At Missouri, where he played in 1917 and from 1919 to 1920, Travis served as a two-way player, playing on both the offensive and defensive line. In a game against the Iowa State Cyclones, Travis made a tackle that stopped the runner on the Tigers' two-yard line, and then made four tackles in a row to prevent Iowa State from scoring. He recovered two fumbles and blocked a field goal and a punt in a 13–7 win over the Kansas Jayhawks. Travis was named to the All-Missouri Valley teams in 1919 and 1920. Over his last two seasons with the team, the Tigers finished with a 12–2–2 record and won the 1919 Missouri Valley championship.

After his tenure at Missouri, Travis played professionally for the Rock Island Independents in 1921 and the St. Louis All-Stars in 1923, the latter of whom he played for as a right tackle. Travis appeared in five games for the Independents, with four games started, and in seven games for the All-Stars, starting every game. While he played professional football, Travis stood at stood at 6 feet 1 inch (185 cm) and weighed 205 pounds (93 kg).

After his playing career, he became an automobile dealer in St. Charles, Missouri, opening the Travis Service Co. Buick Agency, where he worked from 1920 until 1956. In St. Charles, Travis served on a local school board, and was its president for four years; Travis was also a member of the St. Charles County Highway Commission from 1923 to 1963, was president of the Missouri Auto Dealers Association, and was president and director of the St. Charles Chamber of Commerce. He was inducted into the Missouri Sports Hall of Fame in 1972, and the College Football Hall of Fame in 1974. Travis was married in Margaret Martin Travis. Travis died on September 18, 1982, in Chesterfield, Missouri, after a long illness. He had a son, J. Ed. Travis III, a daughter, Anne, and a sister, Dorothy.
