= Tom Leary =

American football player (1904–1976)

Personal information
- Born: April 15, 1904; Springfield, Massachusetts
- Died: August 6, 1976 (aged 72); Springfield, Massachusetts
- Listed height: 5 ft 11 in (1.80 m)
- Listed weight: 180 lb (82 kg)

Career information
- College: Fordham University

Career history
- Frankford Yellow Jackets (1927); Staten Island Stapletons (1929); Newark Tornadoes (1930); Frankford Yellow Jackets (1931)
- Stats at Pro Football Reference

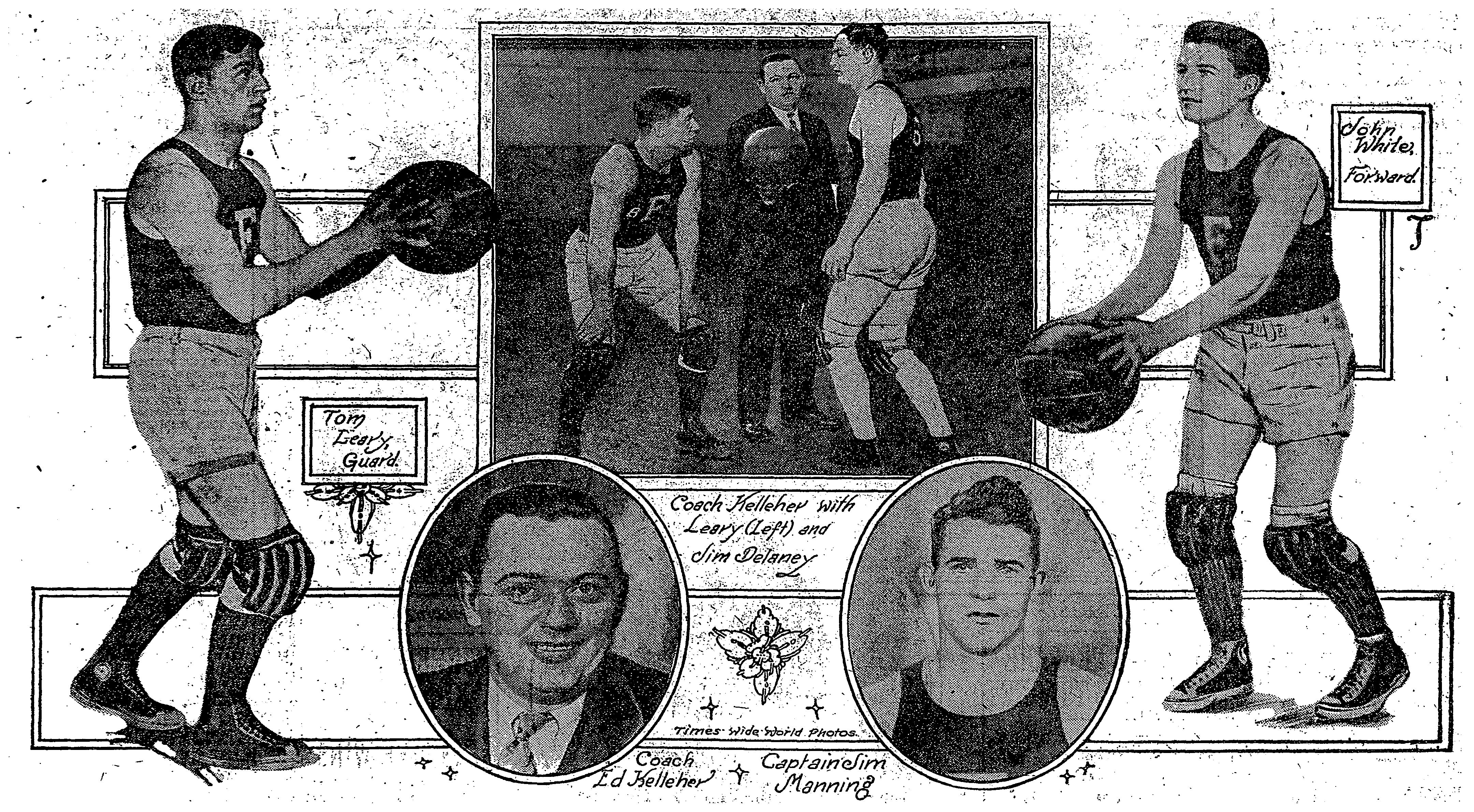
Leary, in 1925-26 (leftmost, standing)

Thomas John Leary (April 15, 1904 – August 6, 1976) was an American professional football player who spent four seasons in the National Football League from 1927 to 1931 with the Frankford Yellow Jackets, Staten Island Stapletons, and Newark Tornadoes. Leary appeared in 26 career games, making 20 starts.
