= Stephen Sieradzki =

American football player (1923–1968)

Profile
- Position: Fullback

Personal information
- Born: April 5, 1923; Syracuse, New York
- Died: May 1968 (age 45)
- Listed height: 6 ft 0 in (1.83 m)
- Listed weight: 195 lb (88 kg)

Career information
- High school: Muskegon
- College: Michigan State University

Career history
- New York Yankees (AAFC) (1948) * Brooklyn Dodgers (AAFC) (1948)
- Stats at Pro Football Reference

Stephen Henry Sieradzki (April 5, 1923 – May 1968) was an American football fullback. He played college football for Michigan State in 1946 and 1947 and in the All-America Football Conference in 1948.

== Early life ==
Sieradzki was born in 1923 in Syracuse, New York. He moved to Muskegon, Michigan, in his youth and attended Muskegon High School. He served in the United States Army during World War II. He broke both ankles while making 87 parachute jumps as an instructor.

== Football player ==
After the war, Sieradzki enrolled at Michigan State College (later known as Michigan State University) and played college football at the fullback position for the Spartans in 1946 and 1947. He also played college baseball for Michigan State.

In June 1948, Sieradzki signed a combined football and baseball contradt with the Ne York Yankees of the American League and All-American Football Conference (AAFC). He also played for Brooklyn Dodgers of the AAFC during the 1948 season. He appeared in three AAFC games, two for the Yankees and one for the Dodgers. He was released by the Dodgers in April 1949.

== Family and later years ==
After his football career ended, Sieradzki worked as a real estate broker, eventually forming his own firm with a partner. He was also a leader in several major developments in the Muskegon area.

Sieradzki married Virginia Tolar in 1946. They had eight children. Sieradzki died from an apparent heart attack in 1968 at age 44.
