= Art Webb =

American football player (1893–1973)

Profile
- Position: Tackle / Guard

Personal information
- Born: February 17, 1893; Syracuse, New York
- Died: April 12, 1973 (aged 80); Rocky River, Ohio
- Listed height: 5 ft 10 in (1.78 m)
- Listed weight: 210 lb (95 kg)

Career information
- College: None

Career history
- Rochester Jeffersons (1920); Milwaukee Badgers (1922)

Career statistics
- Games played: 16
- Stats at Pro Football Reference

Arthur E. "Art" Webb (February 17, 1893 – April 12, 1973) was a player in the National Football League. He first played with the Rochester Jeffersons during the 1920 NFL season. After a year away from the NFL, he played with the Milwaukee Badgers during the 1922 NFL season.
