= Frank Jordan (American football) =

American football player (1897–1980)

Profile
- Position: Back

Personal information
- Born: December 5, 1897; Minneapolis
- Died: September 1, 1980 (aged 82); Tucson, Arizona
- Listed weight: 168 lb (76 kg)

Career information
- College: Bucknell, Villanova

Career history
- Rock Island Independents (1920); Milwaukee Badgers (1923)

Career statistics
- Games: 4
- Stats at Pro Football Reference

Francis Lagoria Jordan (December 5, 1897 – September 1980) was an American football player. A native of Minneapolis, he played college football for Bucknell and Villanova and professional football in the National Football League (NFL) as a back for the Rock Island Independents in 1920 and for the Milwaukee Badgers in 1923. He appeared in four NFL games, one as a starter.

Jordan and his wife, Jane, had two daughters (Jane and Marionne). He died in 1980 in Tucson, Arizona, at age 82.
