= Norm Harvey =

American football player (1899–1941)

No. 17, 4, 14, 28, 9
- Position: Tackle

Personal information
- Born: May 19, 1899; Michigan, U.S.
- Died: December 1941; Detroit, Michigan, U.S.
- Listed height: 6 ft 0 in (1.83 m)
- Listed weight: 196 lb (89 kg)

Career information
- High school: Calumet (Calumet, Michigan)
- College: Detroit

Career history
- Buffalo Bisons (1925); Detroit Panthers (1926); Buffalo Bisons (1927); New York Yankees (1927); Providence Steam Roller (1928–1929)

Awards and highlights
- NFL champion (1928); Third-team All-Pro (1925)
- Stats at Pro Football Reference

Norman Chester Harvey (May 19, 1899 – December 1941) was an American professional football tackle who played five seasons in the National Football League (NFL) with the Buffalo Bisons, Detroit Panthers, New York Yankees and Providence Steam Roller. He played college football at the University of Detroit.

== Early life and college ==
Norman Chester Harvey was born on May 19, 1899, in Michigan. He attended Calumet High School in Calumet, Michigan.

Harrvey played college football for the Detroit Titans of the University of Detroit, and was a two-year letterman from 1923 to 1924.

== Professional career ==
Harvey played in five games, all starts, for the Buffalo Bison of the National Football League (NFL) in 1925 and was named a third-team All-Pro by Collyer's Eye.

He appeared in eight games, starting one, for the NFL's Detroit Panthers during the 1926 season.

Harvey returned to the Bisons in 1927 and started five games that year. He also played in nine games, starting seven, for the New York Yankees of the NFL in 1927.

Harvey appeared in nine games, starting four, for the Providence Steam Roller of the NFL in 1928. The Steam Roller finished the season first in the NFL with an 8–1–2. Harvey played in eight games, starting two, during the 1929 season.

== Personal life ==
Harvey died on December 14, 1941, in Detroit, Michigan. (Note: Different sources have different dates.)
