= Chim Lingrel =

American football player (1899–1962)

No. 12
- Position: Wingback / Halfback / Fullback

Personal information
- Born: January 21, 1899; Ridgeway, Ohio, United States
- Died: March 11, 1962 (aged 63); Kenton, Ohio, United States
- Listed height: 6 ft 2 in (1.88 m)
- Listed weight: 200 lb (91 kg)

Career information
- High school: Kenton (OH)
- College: Miami (OH)

Career history
- Oorang Indians (1922)
- Stats at Pro Football Reference

Paul Chalmer Lingrel (January 21, 1899 – March 11, 1962) was a professional football player who played in the National Football League during the 1923 season. That season, he joined the NFL's Oorang Indians. The Indians were a team based in LaRue, Ohio, composed only of Native Americans, and coached by Jim Thorpe.
