= Tom Lomasney =

American football player (1906–1976)

Profile
- Position: End

Personal information
- Born: May 11, 1906; Salem, Massachusetts, U.S.
- Died: December 29, 1976 (aged 70); Salem, Massachusetts, U.S.
- Listed height: 6 ft 0 in (1.83 m)
- Listed weight: 190 lb (86 kg)

Career information
- High school: Salem (MA)
- College: Villanova

Career history
- Staten Island Stapletons (1929)

Career statistics
- Games: 5

Thomas Martin Lomasney (May 11, 1906 – December 29, 1976) was an American football player.

Lomasney was born in 1906 in Salem, Massachusetts.

He played college football for Villanova from 1925 to 1928.

He played professional football in the National Football League (NFL) for the Staten Island Stapletons. He appeared in five NFL games, one as a starter, during the 1929 season. His appearances included:

- September 29: substitute at right end
- October 6: substitute at right end
- October 27: starter at right end

He was released to the Buffalo club in late November 1929, but opted instead to join the Brooklyn team.

After retiring as a player, Lomasney became and end coach with St. John's. In the mid-1950s, he was coach of the Salem High School football team.
