= Eddie Lynch =

American football player (1896–1967)

Profile
- Positions: End, tackle

Personal information
- Born: October 4, 1896; Northampton, Massachusetts, U.S.
- Died: August 24, 1967 (aged 70); Dearborn, Michigan, U.S.

Career information
- College: Catholic University

Career history
- 1925: Rochester Jeffersons
- 1926: Detroit Panthers
- 1926: Hartford Blues
- 1927: Providence Steam Roller
- 1929: Orange Tornadoes

Edward James "Ace" Lynch (October 4, 1896 – August 24, 1967) was a professional American football lineman and basketball player. He played five seasons in the National Football League (NFL), for the Rochester Jeffersons (1925), the Detroit Panthers (1926), the Hartford Blues (1926), the Providence Steam Roller (1927), and the Orange Tornadoes (1929).
