= Frank Youngfleish =

American football player (1897–1953)

No. 26, 4
- Positions: Guard, center

Personal information
- Born: May 7, 1897; Pottsville, Pennsylvania, U.S.
- Died: January 21, 1953 (aged 55); Pottsville, Pennsylvania, U.S.
- Listed height: 5 ft 9 in (1.75 m)
- Listed weight: 190 lb (86 kg)

Career information
- High school: Pottsville
- College: Villanova

Career history
- Pottsville Maroons (1926–1927)

Career statistics
- Games played: 15
- Games started: 9

Frank Whiting "Yank" Youngfleish (May 7, 1897 – January 21, 1953) was an American professional football and local politician. He played as a guard and center during the early years of the National Football League (NFL). After graduation from Villanova University, where he played college football as a center, Youngfleish joined his hometown Pottsville Maroons for two seasons, in 1926 and 1927.

A native of Pottsville, Pennsylvania, Youngfleish served overseas in the United States Army during World War I with the 103rd Engineer Battalion. He later served two terms as a city councilman in Pottsville, as director of public parks and director of finances, and was acting mayor of the city for two years during the illness of Claude A. Lord. Youngfleish died on January 21, 1953, at Pottsville Hospital.
