= Hank A. Smith =

American football player (1893–1985)

Hank Smith
Profile
- Position: Offense linemen

Personal information
- Born: July 23, 1893; Lancaster, New York
- Died: March 3, 1985 (aged 91); Buffalo, New York
- Listed height: 6 ft 1 in (1.85 m)
- Listed weight: 189 lb (86 kg)

Career history
- Rochester Jeffersons (1920–23); Rock Island Independents (1923); Rochester Jeffersons (1924–25)

Career statistics
- Games: 38

Henry A. Smith (July 23, 1893 in Lancaster, New York – February 3, 1985 in Buffalo, New York) was an offensive linemen in the National Football League (NFL) for six seasons.

== Playing career ==
From the 1920 to 1925 seasons, Smith played nearly his entire career for the Rochester Jeffersons. He also played four games for the Rock Island Independents in 1923. He played left guard for Rochester during his first two seasons, before switching to right tackle for his third. From 1923 to 1925, he played center.
