= Ed McCrillis =

American football player (1904–1940)

Profile
- Position: Guard

Personal information
- Born: September 7, 1904; New York, U.S.
- Died: September 1, 1940 (aged 35); Warwick, Rhode Island, U.S.
- Listed height: 6 ft 0 in (1.83 m)
- Listed weight: 205 lb (93 kg)

Career information
- High school: Classical (Providence, Rhode Island)
- College: Brown

Career history
- Providence Steam Roller (1926); Boston Bulldogs (1929)
- Stats at Pro Football Reference

Edgar Vincent Frederick McCrillis (September 7, 1904 – September 1, 1940) was a professional football player who spent two seasons in the National Football League (NFL)with the Providence Steam Roller, in 1926, and the Boston Bulldogs in 1929. Prior to playing professional football, McCrillis played college football at Brown University. He was later selected for Brown's All-Decade Team (1920–1929).
