= Jimmy Woods (American football) =

American football player (1894–1966)

Profile
- Positions: Center, tackle, guard

Personal information
- Born: May 5, 1894; Jamestown, New York, U.S.
- Died: December 3, 1966 (aged 72); Salamanca, New York, U.S.
- Listed height: 5 ft 9 in (1.75 m)
- Listed weight: 196 lb (89 kg)

Career history
- Rochester Jeffersons (1920–1924)

Career NFL statistics
- Games: 22
- Stats at Pro Football Reference

James John Woods (May 5, 1894 – December 3, 1966, or August 6, 1896 - June 13, 1975) was an American football player. A native of Jamestown, New York, he played professional football a center, tackle, and guard for the Rochester Jeffersons in the earliest years of the National Football League (NFL). He appeared in 13 or 22 NFL games between 1920 and 1924. Prior to playing professional football, he worked as an electrical welder. After retiring from football, he lived in Salamanca, New York, and worked for Prudential Insurance Co.
