= Bullets Walson =

American football player (1895–1972)

Charles Walson
- Born: October 30, 1899; Zukov, Austria-Hungary
- Died: May 21, 1953 (aged 53); New Jersey, U.S.
- Football career

Profile
- Position: Quarterback

Career history
- Washington Senators

Career statistics
- Games played: 2
- Stats at Pro Football Reference
- Military career
- Branch: United States Navy

Charles Francis Walson (October 30, 1899 – May 21, 1943), also known as Bullets Walson, was an American boxer and football player. He played professional football for the Washington Senators (also known as the Washington Pros) in the 1920s.

Prior to his athletic career, Walson served with the United States Navy on board the USS Pennsylvania. During his service, he was light-heavyweight boxing champion of the Pennsylvania as well as playing football where he became a member of the All-Navy team.

== Death ==
Walson died in his home in 1953 following a long illness.
