= Bart J. Carroll =

American football player and coach (1893–1967)

Biographical details
- Born: December 29, 1893; Louisville, New York, U.S.
- Died: April 1, 1967 (aged 73); Schenectady, New York, U.S.

Playing career

Football
- 1914–1917: Colgate
- 1920: Rochester Jeffersons
- Position: Tackle

Coaching career (HC unless noted)

Football
- 1919–1920: St. Lawrence
- 1921: Colgate (line)
- 1922–1926: Hamilton

Basketball
- c. 1920: St. Lawrence
- 1922–1923: Hamilton

Head coaching record
- Overall: 17–30–5 (football)

Bart J. Carroll (December 29, 1893 – April 1, 1967) was an American football player and coach. He played college football at Colgate University from 1914 to 1917 and professionally with the Rochester Jeffersons of the American Professional Football Association (APFA)—now known as the National Football League (NFL)—for one season, in 1920. Carroll served as the head football coach at St. Lawrence University from 1919 to 1920 and Hamilton College from 1922 to 1926. He was also the head basketball coach at Hamilton for one season, in 1922–23, tallying a mark of 7–7.
