= Jake Hoffman (American football) =

American football player (1895–1977)

No. 14
- Position: Fullback

Personal information
- Born: July 21, 1895; Syracuse, New York
- Died: February 11, 1977 (aged 81); Jordan, New York
- Listed height: 5 ft 8 in (1.73 m)
- Listed weight: 170 lb (77 kg)

Career information
- High school: East Syracuse (NY)

Career history
- Rochester Jeffersons (1925)

Jacob Harry Hoffman (July 21, 1895 – February 11, 1977) was an American football player.

Hoffman was born in Syracuse, New York, in 1895. He served in the United States Army and was a veteran of the Mexican Border War prior to the U.S. entry into World War I.

He played at the fullback position in the National Football League (NFL) for the Rochester Jeffersons in 1925. He appeared in four NFL games, two as a starter.

After his football career ended, he lived in Jordan, New York, for more than 30 years. He was employed as the business agent for a lathers union. He married Mary Bink, and they had a son and a daughter. Hoffman died in 1977 at age 81 at Community-General Hospital in Syracuse, New York.
