= Wayne Kakela =

American football player (1904–1955)

Profile
- Positions: Center, guard

Personal information
- Born: May 9, 1904; Eveleth, Minnesota, U.S.
- Died: February 9, 1955 (aged 50); Toledo, Ohio, U.S.
- Listed height: 6 ft 2 in (1.88 m)
- Listed weight: 220 lb (100 kg)

Career information
- High school: Eveleth (MN)
- College: Minnesota

Career history
- Minneapolis Red Jackets (1930)

Wayne Elias "Ike" Kakela (May 9, 1904 – February 9, 1955) was an American football player. He played college football for Minnesota and in the National Football League (NFL) as a center and guard for the Minneapolis Red Jackets (1930). He appeared in three NFL games. He was also hired as the line coach at Hamline College in 1930.

After his football career ended, he worked for the Toledo, Ohio Chamber of Commerce from 1936 until his death in 1955. He was the chamber's president starting in 1948. He died in Toledo, Ohio of cancer on February 9, 1955.
