= Harvey Levy (American football) =

American football player (1902–1986)

Personal information
- Born: June 8, 1902; Syracuse, New York
- Died: September 29, 1986 (aged 84); North Olmsted, Ohio
- Listed height: 5 ft 10 in (1.78 m)
- Listed weight: 212 lb (96 kg)

Career information
- College: Syracuse

Career history
- New York Yankees (1928)

Harvey Sherwin Levy (June 8, 1902 - September 29, 1986) was an American professional football player who played in the National Football League (NFL) for the New York Yankees for 12 games in 1928.
