= Ed Gallagher (American football, born 1903) =

American football player (1903–1963)

No. 15, 28
- Position: Offensive tackle/Defensive tackle

Personal information
- Born: February 3, 1903; Philadelphia, Pennsylvania, U.S.
- Died: October 1963 (age 60)
- Listed height: 6 ft 1 in (1.85 m)
- Listed weight: 205 lb (93 kg)

Career information
- High school: Asbury Park (NJ)
- College: Washington & Jefferson

Career history
- New York Yankees (1928)

Career statistics
- Games played: 11
- Games started: 11
- Stats at Pro Football Reference

Edward Barto Gallagher (February 3, 1903 — October 1963) was an American professional football player for the New York Yankees. He attended high school in Asbury Park, New Jersey. He attended Washington & Jefferson College.
