= Paul Kitteredge =

American football player (1904–1947)

Profile
- Positions: Halfback, Quarterback

Personal information
- Born: September 4, 1904; Clinton, Massachusetts
- Died: March 2, 1947 (aged 42); Groton, Connecticut
- Listed height: 5 ft 10 in (1.78 m)
- Listed weight: 170 lb (77 kg)

Career information
- College: Holy Cross College

Career history
- Boston Bulldogs (1929)
- Stats at Pro Football Reference

Paul John Kittredge (1904-1947) was a professional football player who played in the National Football League with the Boston Bulldogs in 1929.
