= Bob Phelan =

American football player (1898–1973)

No. 17
- Positions: Halfback, Fullback

Personal information
- Born: June 20, 1898; Charleston, Iowa, U.S.
- Died: August 1, 1973 (aged 75); Fort Madison, Iowa, U.S.
- Listed height: 5 ft 11 in (1.80 m)
- Listed weight: 185 lb (84 kg)

Career information
- High school: Fort Madison (IA)
- College: Notre Dame

Career history

Playing
- Toledo Maroons (1922); Rock Island Independents (1923–1924)

Coaching
- Nevada (1925) Assistant coach

Career statistics
- Games played: 21
- Games started: 16
- Rushing touchdowns: 2
- Stats at Pro Football Reference

Robert Richard Phelan (June 20, 1898 – August 1, 1973) was an American football player. A native of Charleston, Iowa, he played at the halfback and fullback positions for Knute Rockne's undefeated 1920 Notre Dame Fighting Irish football team that included George Gipp and won the national championship. He then played professional football in the National Football League (NFL) as a back for the Toledo Maroons in 1922 and for the Rock Island Independents in 1923 and 1924. He appeared in 21 NFL games, 16 as a starter. After his playing career ended, he served as assistant coach of the Nevada Wolf Pack football team.
