= Joe Bachmaier =

American football player (1895–1974)

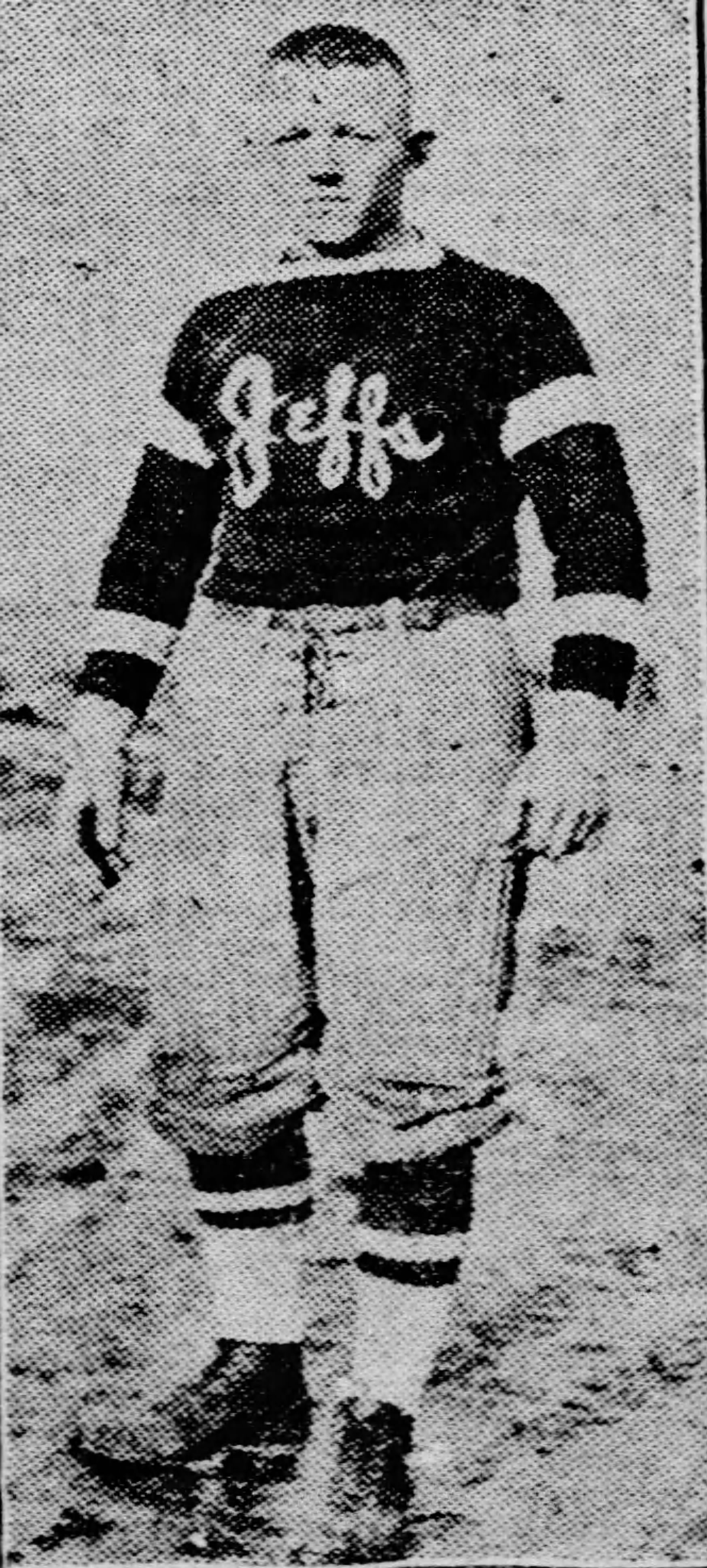
- Bachmaier, 1918

Profile
- Positions: Center, guard, tackle, end

Personal information
- Born: March 11, 1895; Rochester, New York, U.S.
- Died: January 14, 1974 (aged 78); Rochester, New York, U.S.
- Listed height: 5 ft 9 in (1.75 m)
- Listed weight: 175 lb (79 kg)

Career history
- Rochester Jeffersons (1920–1924)

Career NFL statistics
- Games played: 21

Joseph William Bachmaier (March 11, 1895 – January 14, 1974) was an American football player. A native of Rochester, New York, he played professional football as a center, guard, tackle, and end for the Rochester Jeffersons in the National Football League (NFL). He appeared in 21 NFL games between the 1920 and 1924 seasons. Bachmaier also played for the Jeffersons in 1917 and 1919 (prior to the formation of the NFL) and served in the United States Marine Corps during World War I.
