= George Mooney =

American football player (1896–1985)

Profile
- Position: Back

Personal information
- Born: February 22, 1896; Chicago, Illinois
- Died: February 10, 1985 (aged 88); Glendale, California
- Listed height: 5 ft 8 in (1.73 m)
- Listed weight: 163 lb (74 kg)

Career information
- College: None

Career history
- Milwaukee Badgers (1922–1924)

Career statistics
- Games played: 18
- Stats at Pro Football Reference

George Washington Mooney (February 22, 1896 – February 10, 1985) was a player in the National Football League. He played three seasons with the Milwaukee Badgers.
