= Frank Racis =

American football player (1899–1982)

No. 2, 36, 10, 12
- Positions: Guard, tackle, end

Personal information
- Born: November 9, 1899; Shenandoah, Pennsylvania, U.S.
- Died: August 19, 1982 (aged 82); Shenandoah, Pennsylvania, U.S.
- Listed height: 6 ft 0 in (1.83 m)
- Listed weight: 200 lb (91 kg)

Career information
- High school: Shenandoah Valley (Shenandoah, Pennsylvania)

Career history
- Pottsville Maroons (1925–1928); New York Yankees (1928); Boston Bulldogs (1929); Providence Steam Roller (1930); Frankford Yellow Jackets (1931)

Awards and highlights
- Collyers Eye Mag.: 1st team all-NFL (1926); GB Press-Gazette: 2nd team all-NFL (1929)
- Stats at Pro Football Reference

Frank J. "Champ" Racis (November 9, 1899 – August 19, 1982) was a professional football player from Shenandoah, Pennsylvania. He played during the early years of the National Football League (NFL) with the Pottsville Maroons, Frankford Yellow Jackets, Boston Bulldogs and Providence Steam Roller. Racis made his professional debut with the Maroons in 1925. His career lasted seven seasons. In 1925, Racis helped the Maroons win the NFL Championship, before it was stripped from the team in a controversy due to a disputed rules violation.

Racis died on August 19, 1982, at his home in Shenandoah.
