= Frank Hertz =

American football player (1902–1963)

Profile
- Position: End

Personal information
- Born: November 6, 1902; Marinette County, Wisconsin
- Died: July 20, 1963 (aged 60); Kaukauna, Wisconsin
- Listed height: 5 ft 10 in (1.78 m)
- Listed weight: 185 lb (84 kg)

Career information
- High school: Waukesha (WI)
- College: Carroll (WI)

Career history
- Milwaukee Badgers (1926)
- Stats at Pro Football Reference

Frank Wilbur Hertz (November 6, 1902 – July 20, 1963) was a player in the National Football League for the Milwaukee Badgers in 1926 as an end. He played at the collegiate level at Carroll University.

== Biography ==
Hertz was born on November 6, 1902, in Marinette County, Wisconsin to Edward J. Hertz and Charlotta (Classen) Hertz. He died of a heart attack in Kaukauna, Wisconsin.
