= Donald Curtin =

American football player and physician (1901–1963)

Profile
- Position: Blocking back

Personal information
- Born: November 3, 1901; Hollandtown, Wisconsin
- Died: March 17, 1963 (aged 61); West Palm Beach, Florida
- Listed height: 5 ft 8 in (1.73 m)
- Listed weight: 155 lb (70 kg)

Career information
- High school: West Division (Milwaukee, WI)
- College: Marquette

Career history
- Milwaukee Badgers (1926); Racine Tornadoes (1926)

Career statistics
- Games played: 4
- Stats at Pro Football Reference

Donald William Curtin (November 3, 1901 – March 17, 1963) was a player in the National Football League and a physician in Kimberly, Wisconsin.

== Life ==
Curtin was born on November 3, 1901, in Hollandtown, Wisconsin. He practiced medicine in Kimberly from 1933 until the time of his death. He died from a heart ailment on March 17, 1963, while vacationing in West Palm Beach, Florida.

== Football career ==
Curtin was a star football player for Marquette University in 1923 and 1924. He split the 1926 NFL season between the Milwaukee Badgers and the Racine Tornadoes.
