= Hersh Martin (American football) =

American football player (1906–1975)

Profile
- Position: Back

Personal information
- Born: July 16, 1906; Springfield, Missouri, U.S.
- Died: June 25, 1975 (aged 68); Fort Lauderdale, Florida, U.S.
- Listed height: 5 ft 11 in (1.80 m)
- Listed weight: 180 lb (82 kg)

Career information
- High school: Manual (MO)
- College: Kansas, Missouri

Career history
- Staten Island Stapletons (1928–1929); Newark Tornadoes (1930)

Herschel Herbert Martin (July 16, 1906 – June 25, 1975) was an American football player.

Martin was born in 1906 in Missouri. He attended Manual High School in Kansas City, Missouri.

Martin played college football for Kansas and Missouri.

He also played professional football in the National Football League (NFL) as a back for the Staten Island Stapletons (1928-1929) and Newark Tornadoes (1930). He appeared in 15 NFL games, five as a starter. He also played for the Orange Tornadoes in 1933, the East Orange Tornadoes in 1934, and the Stapleton Buffaloes in 1936.

Martin died in 1975 at age 68 in Fort Lauderdale, Florida.
