= Ernie Woerner =

American football player (1905–1972)

Profile
- Position: Tackle

Personal information
- Born: May 26, 1906; Newark, New Jersey, U.S.
- Died: December 26, 1972 (aged 66); Atlantic Highlands, New Jersey, U.S.
- Listed height: 5 ft 8 in (1.73 m)
- Listed weight: 200 lb (91 kg)

Career information
- High school: Central (NJ)
- College: Bucknell

Career history
- Newark Tornadoes (1930)

Erwin "Ernie" Woerner (May 26, 1905 – December 26, 1972) was an American football player.

Woerner was born in 1906 in Newark, New Jersey and attended Central High School in that city. He then enrolled at Bucknell University, where he played college football at the tackle position from 1927 to 1929. He was elected captain of the 1929 Bucknell football team.

Woerner also played professional football in the National Football League (NFL) as a tackle for the Newark Tornadoes (1930). He appeared in eight NFL games, four as a starter.

Woerner died in 1972 in Atlantic Highlands, New Jersey.
