= Red Maloney =

American football player (1901–1976)

Profile
- Position: End

Personal information
- Born: September 5, 1901; Ware, Massachusetts, USA
- Died: May 1976; Massachusetts, USA
- Listed height: 5 ft 11 in (1.80 m)
- Listed weight: 180 lb (82 kg)

Career information
- College: Dartmouth

Career history
- Providence Steam Roller (1925); New York Yankees (1926–1927); Boston Bulldogs (1929)
- Stats at Pro Football Reference

Gerald Stack Maloney (September 5, 1901 - May, 1976) was an American professional football player who spent three seasons in the National Football League with the Providence Steam Roller, New York Yankees and the Boston Bulldogs. Red also played in the first American Football League with the Yankees, in 1926 and followed that team to the NFL the very next season.
