= Sam Mason (American football) =

American football player (1899–1971)

Profile
- Position: Fullback

Personal information
- Born: July 21, 1899; Hampton, Virginia, U.S.
- Died: March 7, 1971 (aged 71); Richmond, Virginia, U.S.
- Listed height: 5 ft 8 in (1.73 m)
- Listed weight: 175 lb (79 kg)

Career information
- High school: Episcopal (Alexandria, Virginia)
- College: VMI

Career history
- Minneapolis Marines (1922); Milwaukee Badgers (1925)

Samuel Anthony Mason II (July 21, 1899 – March 7, 1971) was an American football player and construction executive.

== Early life ==
Mason was born in 1899 in Hampton, Virginia. He was born into a family that had been in the construction business since the 1820 and which was led by Silas B. Mason. He attended Episcopal High School in Alexandria, Virginia.

== Football career ==
Mason attended the Virginia Military Institute (VMI). He played at the end position for VMI from 1917 to 1920 and was chosen for the All South-Atlantic team. He was a member of the undefeated 1920 VMI Keydets football team that compiled a 9–0 record and became known as the "Flying Squadron". One writer at the time noted: "Mason is one of those men who accomplish difficult things with apparent ease. The very ease with which he stopped plays caused him to be overlooked by some of the so-called experts."

According to Pro Football Reference, Mason also played professional football for the Minneapolis Marines in 1922 and for the Milwaukee Badgers in 1925. Another source, "Pro Football Archives", belies the contention that Mason played for the Badgers, instead crediting Orin Mason as the "Mason" who played for the 1925 Badgers.

== Later life ==
After graduating from VMI, Mason undertook graduate studies at Princeton University. He then worked for the New York architectural and engineering firm of Mason and Hanger. He remained with the company from 1921 to 1943 and was involved in construction projects including the Merrimac powder plant.

Mason became president of the Silas Mason Co. in 1943. The company was a contractor on major construction projects, including the Grand Coulee Dam, the Pennsylvania Turnpike, the Lincoln Tunnel and the Radford Arsenal.

In later years, Mason returned to Virginia where he bred horses. He died in 1971 in Richmond, Virginia. In 1972, he was posthumously inducted into the VMI Hall of Fame as one of its charter members. He was also named as one of two ends on the all-time VMI football team.
