= Will Anderson (fullback) =

American football player (1897–1982)

Profile
- Position: Fullback

Personal information
- Born: May 5, 1897; Muskegon, Michigan, U.S.
- Died: April 24, 1982 (aged 84); Hinsdale, Illinois, U.S.
- Listed height: 5 ft 10 in (1.78 m)
- Listed weight: 174 lb (79 kg)

Career information
- High school: Muskegon (MI)
- College: Syracuse

Career history
- Rochester Jeffersons (1923–1924)

Career statistics
- Games: 4

Willard August Anderson (May 5, 1897 – April 24, 1982) was an American football player.

Anderson was born in Muskegon, Michigan, in 1897. He attended high school there as well. He then enrolled at Syracuse University where he played college football from 1919 to 1922. He received Syracuse's Corpse and Coffin football trophy in March 1922.

Andersonalso played professional football as a fullback for the Rochester Jeffersons in the National Football League (NFL). He appeared in four NFL games, three as a starter, during the 1923 and 1924 seasons.

Anderson later became a high school football coach, holding positions including Ogdensburg, New York, Anderson died in 1982 in Hinsdale, Illinois.
