= Leo Peyton =

American football player (1899–1989)

Profile
- Position: Fullback

Personal information
- Born: November 4, 1899
- Died: April 9, 1989 (aged 89)
- Listed height: 5 ft 11 in (1.80 m)
- Listed weight: 190 lb (86 kg)

Career information
- High school: Canton (NY)

Career history
- Rochester Jeffersons (1923–1924)

Career statistics
- Games: 6

Leo Peyton (November 4, 1899 – April 9, 1989), sometimes listed as Leo Payton, was an American football player. He played professional football a fullback for the Rochester Jeffersons in the National Football League (NFL). He grew up in Canton, New York, and appeared in six NFL games, four as a starter, during the 1923 and 1924 seasons.
