= Tommy Fallon =

American football player (1899–1929)

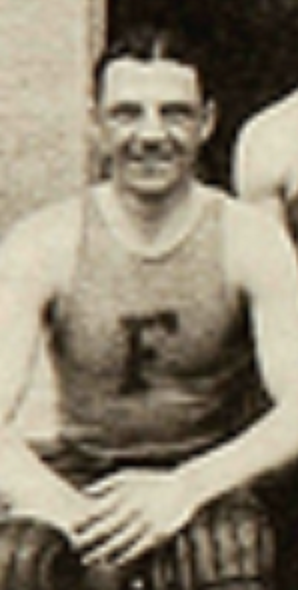
- Fallon with the Fordham Rams men's basketball team

Profile
- Positions: Guard, end

Personal information
- Born: 1899; Rye, New York, US
- Died: June 13, 1929 (aged 29–30); Seattle, Washington, US
- Listed height: 5 ft 9 in (1.75 m)
- Listed weight: 170 lb (77 kg)

Career information
- High school: Rye High School
- College: Fordham

Career history
- Milwaukee Badgers (1922)

Career NFL statistics
- Games played: 8
- Games started: 4

Thomas James Fallon (1899 – June 13, 1929) was an American football guard and end in the National Football League. He played with the Milwaukee Badgers during the 1922 NFL season. He played college football at Fordham.

== Early life and career ==
Fallon was born in Rye, New York and attended Springfield YMCA College in 1919. He transferred to Fordham in 1920, where he played football, baseball and basketball, and occasionally took part in track and field competitions. He was named the captain of the basketball team in March 1921. He later played for the Shenandoah Yellow Jackets in 1923.

== Death ==
After football, Fallon worked as a manager for Edison Radio Company in Seattle, Washington. On June 13, 1929, following an argument over his wife's hat, Fallon died after jumping from a seven-story hotel window.
