= Bernie Finn (American football) =

American football player (1907–1993)

Profile
- Position: Running back

Personal information
- Born: June 4, 1907
- Died: September 26, 1993 (aged 86)

Career information
- College: Holy Cross College

Career history
- 1930: Newark Tornadoes
- 1930–1932: Staten Island Stapletons
- 1932: Chicago Cardinals

Bernard Finn (June 4, 1907 – September 26, 1993) was an American professional football player who was a running back for three seasons for the Newark Tornadoes, Staten Island Stapletons, and Chicago Cardinals.
