= Heinie Jawish =

American football player (1900–1941)

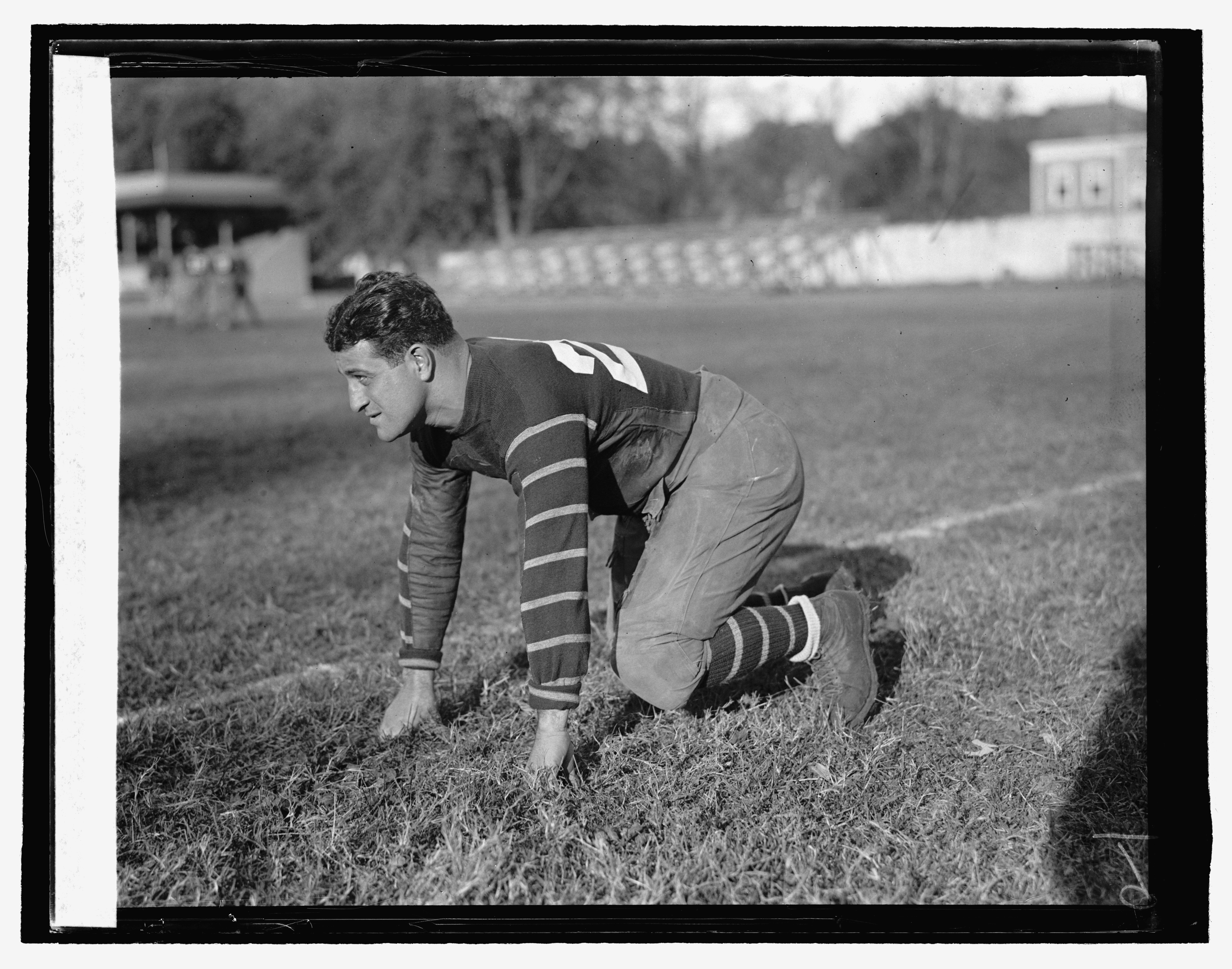
- Jawish at Georgetown, 1925

Profile
- Position: Tackle / guard

Personal information
- Born: February 15, 1900; Syria, Ottoman Empire
- Died: March 14, 1941 (aged 41); Washington, D.C., U.S.
- Listed height: 5 ft 8 in (1.73 m)
- Listed weight: 210 lb (95 kg)

Career information
- High school: Emerson Preparatory (Washington, D.C.)
- College: George Washington (1921); Georgetown (1922–1925)

Career history
- Pottsville Maroons (1926)

Career NFL statistics
- Games played: 9
- Stats at Pro Football Reference

Henry King "Heinie" Jawish (February 15, 1900 – March 14, 1941) was a Syrian-born American professional football player as a tackle and guard. He immigrated to the United States at age 10 and attended school in Washington, D.C. He first attended George Washington University and played football there in 1921. He then transferred to Georgetown University and played football for them from 1923 to 1925. After college, Jawish played one season for the Pottsville Maroons of the National Football League (NFL). He later worked as a real estate broker until he died in 1941, while playing handball.

== Early life ==
Jawish was born on February 15, 1900, in Ottoman Syria. In 1910, he immigrated to the United States with his mother, attending school in Washington, D.C. He grew up competing in basketball and track and field. Jawish was also an amateur wrestler. He attended Emerson Preparatory School in Washington, D.C. He enrolled at George Washington University in 1921 to study law and played football that year for the George Washington Hatchetites. He weighed 200 pounds (91 kg) in college and started for George Washington at left guard. The Ledger-Star described him as "a fast and powerful man" and noted he was "probably the only Syrian playing football in this country on a college team".

Jawish transferred to Georgetown University in 1922. He played for Georgetown's freshman football team that year, having been ineligible to play for the varsity team due to transfer rules. He then played for the varsity from 1923 to 1925, earning letters in 1923 and 1925. Jawish was both a guard and tackle for Georgetown. Jawish helped the 1925 Georgetown team compile a record of 9–1 and was named third-team All-American for his performance.

== Professional career and later life ==
In late September 1926, Jawish signed to play professional football with the Pottsville Maroons of the National Football League (NFL), prior to their second game of the season, against the Media Athletic Association. He was signed as a tackle but also saw playing time as a guard during the season. Jawish became the first and only NFL player from Emerson Preparatory, as well as the third NFL player who had attended George Washington. He finished the season having appeared in nine games, four as a starter, as the team compiled a record of 10–2–2. He did not continue playing professional football after the 1926 season. Jawish stood at 5 feet 8 inches (1.73 m) and weighed 210 pounds (95 kg) in the NFL. As of 2025, he remains the only NFL player to have been born in Syria.

After his football career, Jawish worked as a real estate broker, building apartments in the Washington, D.C.-area. Shortly before his death, he worked on a $1.5 million sale of an apartment to Statler Hotel Corp. Jawish was a freemason and a member of the Dawson Masonic Lodge. He was married to Marjorie Jawish and had two sons with her, including Gary, a boxer. He often played handball. On March 14, 1941, he collapsed and died while playing handball at the YMCA in Washington, D.C. He was 41 at the time of his death.
