= George Brown (gridiron football, died 2013) =

American gridiron football player (1923–2013)

No. 38, 56, 55
- Position: Guard

Personal information
- Born: September 23, 1923; Boyd, Texas, U.S.
- Died: January 21, 2013 (aged 89); Roseville, California, U.S.
- Listed height: 6 ft 2 in (1.88 m)
- Listed weight: 222 lb (101 kg)

Career information
- High school: Fort Worth (TX) North Side
- College: TCU (1946–1948)
- NFL draft: 1949: 8th round, 76th overall pick

Career history
- New York Yankees (1949); New York Yanks (1950); Edmonton Eskimos (1951); BC Lions (1954)

Career NFL/AAFC statistics
- Games played: 20
- Fumble recoveries: 1
- Stats at Pro Football Reference

George William Brown Jr. (September 23, 1923 – January 21, 2013) was an American professional football player who played in the AAFC, NFL and CFL, with the New York Yankees, New York Yanks, BC Lions and Edmonton Eskimos. He previously played football at Texas Christian University and at North Side High School in Fort Worth, Texas.
