= Sam Kaplan (American football) =

American football player (1898–1931)

Profile
- Position: End

Personal information
- Born: June 5, 1898; Washington, D.C., U.S.
- Died: August 23, 1931 (aged 33); Perry Point, Maryland, U.S.
- Listed weight: 166 lb (75 kg)

Career information
- High school: Central (DC)
- College: Lehigh, Catholic

Career history
- Washington Senators (1921)

Career statistics
- Games played: 1
- Games started: 1
- Stats at Pro Football Reference

Samuel Kaplan (June 5, 1898 – August 23, 1931) was an American football end who played for the Washington Senators of the National Football League (NFL), which was known as the APFA at the time.

Kaplan was born in 1899 in Washington, DC. He attended Washington's Central High School where he played at the end position for the football team and also competed for the basketball, baseball, and swimming teams. The Washington Times wrote: "His work was of high order, and he is big and fast enough to make good at college."

Kaplan played college football for Lehigh in 1918 and Catholic University in 1919. He began the 1921 season playing professional football in the NFL for the Washington Senators. He started one game at right end for the club and scored a touchdown. He resigned from the Senators and finished the 1921 season playing for the All-Stars.

In September 1922, Kaplan was hired as the line coach at Kanawa club.

Kaplan received a law degree from Georgetown University Law School. He died from pneumonia on August 23, 1931, at the age of 33 while at Perry Point, Maryland.
