= Frank Bucher =

American football player (1900–1970)

No. 9 (1925), 8 (1926)
- Position: End

Personal information
- Born: December 19, 1900; Fairport, New York, U.S.
- Died: March 1970 (aged 70)
- Listed height: 5 ft 11 in (1.80 m)
- Listed weight: 190 lb (86 kg)

Career information
- College: University of Detroit Mercy

Career history
- Pottsville Maroons (1925–1926)
- Stats at Pro Football Reference

Frank H. Bucher (December 19, 1900 – March 1970) was a football player from Fairport, New York. He played during the early years of the National Football League (NFL) for the Pottsville Maroons from 1925-1926. In 1925 Bucher helped the Maroons win the NFL Championship, before it was stripped from the team due to a disputed rules violation.
