= Roy Scholl =

American football player (1904–1993)

Profile
- Position: Guard

Personal information
- Born: September 15, 1904; Bethlehem, Pennsylvania, U.S.
- Died: October 8, 1993 (aged 89); Allentown, Pennsylvania, U.S.
- Listed height: 5 ft 8 in (1.73 m)
- Listed weight: 205 lb (93 kg)

Career information
- College: Lehigh

Career history
- Boston Bulldogs (1929)
- Stats at Pro Football Reference

Roy Franklin Scholl (September 15, 1904 – October 8, 1993) was an American football player who spent one season in the National Football League (NFL) with the Boston Bulldogs in 1929. Football historian David Neft pointed out, in 1992. that six different newspapers identify Scholl as playing one game, as a sub, for Boston in 1929. Roger Treat's Encyclopedia of Football also has him listed as having played guard with the 1929 Bulldogs.

Scholl was employed by Bethlehem Steel from approximately 1921 to 1951. He died in 1993, at age 89, at the Leigh Valley Hospital in Allentown, Pennsylvania.
