= Bill Capps =

American football player (1904–1979)

Profile
- Positions: Tackle, guard

Personal information
- Born: June 23, 1904; Pooleville, Oklahoma
- Died: January 4, 1979 (aged 74); Oklahoma City, OK
- Listed height: 6 ft 1 in (1.85 m)
- Listed weight: 233 lb (106 kg)

Career information
- High school: Ada (OK)
- College: East Central (OK)

Career history
- Frankford Yellow Jackets (1929–1930); Minneapolis Red Jackets (1930)
- Stats at Pro Football Reference

Thomas Wilburn "Bill" Capps (June 23, 1904 – January 4, 1979) was an American football lineman. He played college football for East Central State University and professional football in the National Football League (NFL) for the Frankford Yellow Jackets (1929–1930) and Minneapolis Red Jackets (1930).

== Early years and college ==
Capps was born in Pooleville, Oklahoma, in 1904. He moved to Randlett, Oklahoma, as a boy and attended Ada High School in Ada, Oklahoma. He attended East Central State University, also in Ada, and played college football there.

== Professional football ==
He played professional football in the National Football League (NFL) as a tackle and guard for the Frankford Yellow Jackets (1929–1930) and Minneapolis Red Jackets (1930). He appeared in 15 NFL games, 11 as a starter. He also played for the Tulsa Oilers of the American Football League in 1934.

== Later life ==
After his football career ended, Capps owned a motel and a used car lot in Oklahoma City. He moved to Weatherford, Oklahoma, in 1960 where he was a partner in an auto dealership. He died in 1979 at age 74 of a heart ailment.
