= Bob Argus =

American football player (1894–1945)

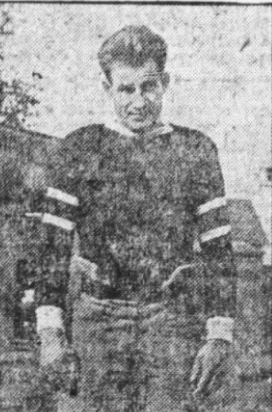

Profile
- Position: Wingback

Personal information
- Born: January 21, 1894; Hammondsport, New York
- Died: December 8, 1945 (aged 51)
- Listed height: 5 ft 10 in (1.78 m)
- Listed weight: 193 lb (88 kg)

Career information
- High school: Rochester (NY) West Side
- College: None

Career history
- Rochester Jeffersons (1920–1925)
- Stats at Pro Football Reference

Robert Anthony Argus (January 21, 1894 – December 8, 1945) was an American professional football player for the Rochester Jeffersons of the National Football League (NFL) from 1920 to 1925. He also played for the Jeffersons prior to 1920, when they were a semi-pro team.
