= Hal Hanson (American football, born 1895) =

American football player and coach (1895–1973)

Profile
- Positions: Guard, center, tackle

Personal information
- Born: November 18, 1895; La Crosse, Wisconsin, U.S.
- Died: October 10, 1973 (aged 77); Sarasota, Florida, U.S.
- Listed height: 6 ft 1 in (1.85 m)
- Listed weight: 190 lb (86 kg)

Career information
- College: South Dakota

Career history
- 1921: Rock Island Independents
- 1923: Minneapolis Marines
- Stats at Pro Football Reference

Harold William Hanson (November 18, 1895 – October 10, 1973) was an American professional football player and head coach in the National Football League (NFL). In 1921 Hanson was a player for the Rock Island Independents. In 1923 he played for the Minneapolis Marines. Hanson played college football for the South Dakota Coyotes.
