= Les Grace =

American football player (1903–1968)

Profile
- Position: End

Personal information
- Born: January 17, 1903; South Amboy, New Jersey, U.S.
- Died: August 19, 1968 (aged 65); Loch Arbour, New Jersey, U.S.
- Listed height: 5 ft 11 in (1.80 m)
- Listed weight: 200 lb (91 kg)

Career information
- High school: Wilmar (NJ)
- College: Temple

Career history
- Newark Tornadoes (1930)

Career statistics
- Games played: 2
- Stats at Pro Football Reference

Tobias Leslie "Red" Grace (January 17, 1903 – August 19, 1968) was an American professional football player who player in the National Football League in 1930 with the Newark Tornadoes, appearing in two games.
