= Howard Lebengood =

American football player (1902–1980)

Profile
- Positions: Halfback, Punter

Personal information
- Born: April 23, 1902; Pottsville, Pennsylvania, U.S.
- Died: January 20, 1980 (aged 77); Lakeland, Florida, U.S.
- Listed height: 5 ft 11 in (1.80 m)
- Listed weight: 175 lb (79 kg)

Career information
- College: Villanova

Career history
- 1925: Pottsville Maroons

Awards and highlights
- Disputed NFL champion (1925)
- Stats at Pro Football Reference

Howard Edward' "Fungy" Lebengood (April 23, 1902 – January 20, 1980) was an American professional football player for the Pottsville Maroons of the National Football League (NFL) in 1925. Lebengood played for the Maroons for his entire one year NFL career. Lebengood helped the Maroons win the 1925 NFL Championship, before it was stripped from the team due to a disputed rules violation.

Prior to joining the Maroons, Lebengood attended Villanova University, where he also played at the college football.
