= Larry McGinnis =

American football player (1899–1948)

Profile
- Position: Guard

Personal information
- Born: July 16, 1899; Topeka, Kansas
- Died: March 21, 1948 (aged 48)
- Listed height: 6 ft 1 in (1.85 m)
- Listed weight: 210 lb (95 kg)

Career information
- High school: Topeka (KS) Catholic
- College: Marquette

Career history
- Milwaukee Badgers (1923–1924)

Career NFL statistics
- Games played: 21
- Stats at Pro Football Reference

James Laurence "Larry" McGinnis (July 16, 1899 – March 21, 1948) was a guard in the National Football League. He played two seasons with the Milwaukee Badgers.
