= Paul Flinn (American football) =

American football player (1895–1980)

Profile
- Position: End

Personal information
- Born: September 11, 1895; St. Paul, Minnesota
- Died: December 23, 1980 (aged 85); St. Paul, Minnesota
- Listed height: 6 ft 0 in (1.83 m)
- Listed weight: 180 lb (82 kg)

Career information
- High school: Central (MN)
- College: Minnesota

Career history
- Minneapolis Marines (1922–1923)

Career statistics
- Games: 11
- Stats at Pro Football Reference

Paul Augustin Flinn (September 11, 1895 – December 23, 1980) was an American football player.

Flinn was born in 1895 in Saint Paul, Minnesota. He attended Central High School in Duluth, Minnesota. He played college football as an end for the Minnesota Golden Gophers in 1915 and 1916. While playing for the 1916 Minnesota Golden Gophers football team, he along with Bert Baston and Pudge Wyman was credited with giving "the most amazing exhibition of the air game ever witnessed on a Western conference gridiron." He studied forestry while at the university but his time there was interrupted by service in the Army during World War I. He planned to return to the football team in 1919, but after finishing second in voting for captaincy of the 1919 team, he opted not to return.

In October 1922, he joined the Minneapolis Marines of the National Football League (NFL). He played at the end position for the Marines, appearing in 11 NFL games, all as a starter, during the 1922 and 1923 seasons.

He died in 1980 in Saint Paul.
