= Bob Dunn (American football) =

American football player (1904–1978)

Profile
- Positions: Center, tackle

Personal information
- Born: November 26, 1904; Waterbury, Connecticut, U.S.
- Died: August 26, 1978 (aged 73); Dover, New Jersey, U.S.
- Listed height: 6 ft 1 in (1.85 m)
- Listed weight: 200 lb (91 kg)

Career information
- High school: Dean Academy (MA)
- College: NYU

Career history
- Staten Island Stapletons (1929)

Career statistics
- Games: 6

Robert Edward Dunn (November 26, 1904 – August 26, 1978) was an American football player.

Dunn was born in 1904 in Waterbury, Connecticut. He attended Crosby School in Waterbury, Connecticut, and the Dean Academy in Franklin, Massachusetts. He then enrolled at New York University and played for NYU Violets football program from 1924 to 1927.

Dunn also played professional football in the National Football League (NFL) for the Staten Island Stapletons. He appeared in six NFL games, all as a starter, during the 1929 season.

Dunn died in 1978 in Dover, New Jersey.
