= Bill Connor (American football) =

American football player (1899–1980)

No. 3
- Positions: Guard, tackle

Personal information
- Born: April 8, 1899; Providence, Rhode Island, U.S.
- Died: December 14, 1980 (aged 81); Norwich, Connecticut, U.S.
- Listed height: 5 ft 8 in (1.73 m)
- Listed weight: 160 lb (73 kg)

Career information
- High school: Bulkeley High School
- College: University of Rhode Island; Providence College; The Catholic University of America

Career history
- Boston Bulldogs (1929); Newark Tornadoes (1930)
- Stats at Pro Football Reference

William Joseph Connor (April 8, 1899 – December 14, 1980) was an American professional football player who spent two seasons in the National Football League (NFL), with the Boston Bulldogs in 1929 and the Newark Tornadoes in 1930.
