= Joe Kozlowsky =

American football player (1901–1970)

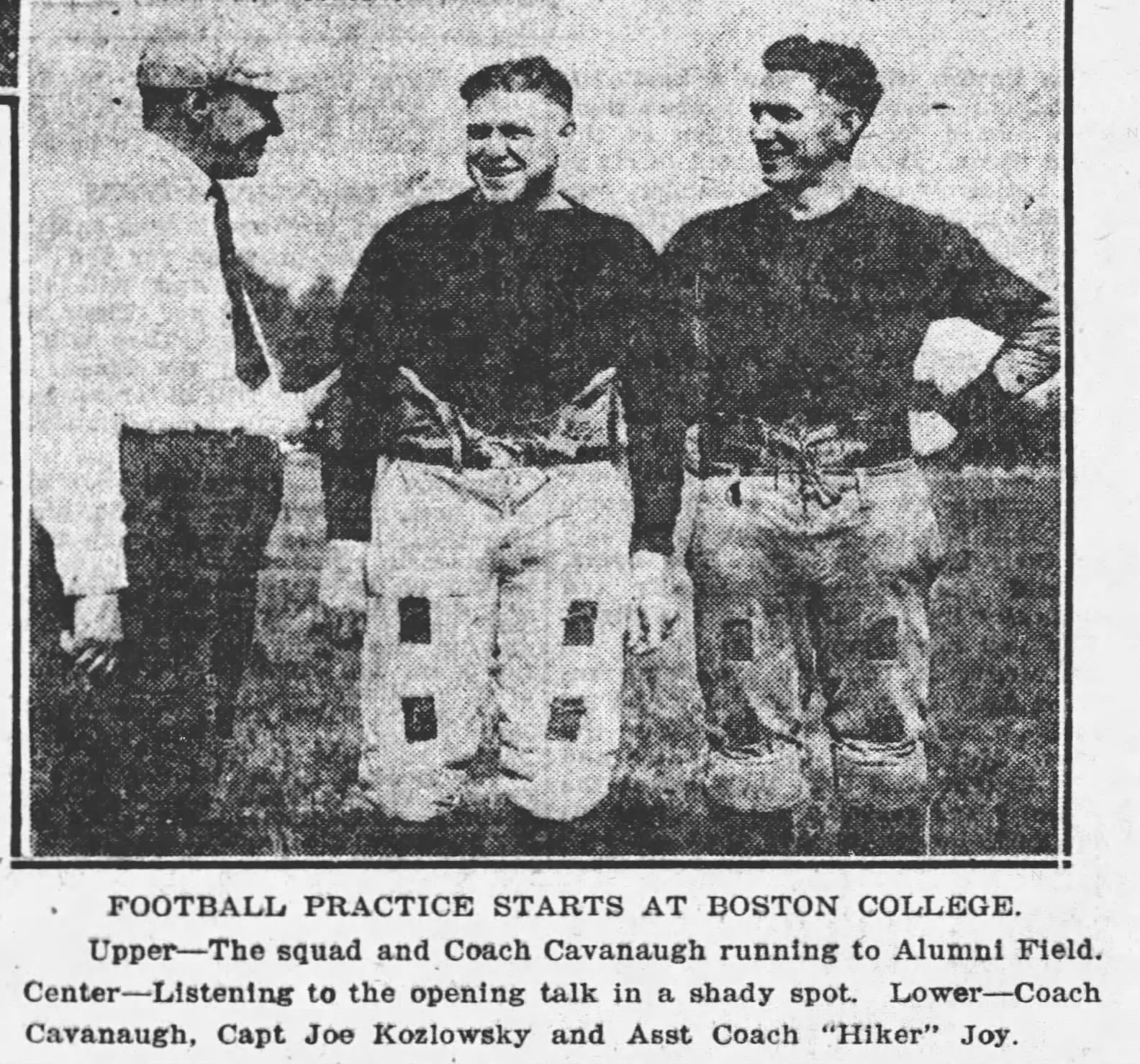

No. 12, 7, 22
- Positions: Tackle, guard, end

Personal information
- Born: August 9, 1901; Cambridge, Massachusetts, U.S.
- Died: December 22, 1970 (aged 69); Cambridge, Massachusetts, U.S.
- Listed height: 5 ft 10 in (1.78 m)
- Listed weight: 201 lb (91 kg)

Career information
- High school: Cambridge Rindge and Latin
- College: Boston College

Career history
- Providence Steam Roller (1925–1927); Boston Bulldogs (1929); Providence Steam Roller (1930)

Awards and highlights
- Boston College Varsity Club Athletic Hall of Fame (1971)
- Stats at Pro Football Reference

Joseph Alexander Kozlowsky (August 9, 1901 – December 22, 1970) was an American football player. He played professionally in the National Football League (NFL) from 1925 to 1930 with the Boston Bulldogs and the Providence Steam Roller. Prior to playing football professionally, Kozlowsky played college football at Boston College and was elected captain of the 1924 Boston College Eagles football team.

In 1926, Kozlowsky was appointed basketball coach at his alma mater, Cambridge High and Latin School—later merged into Cambridge Rindge and Latin School—in Cambridge, Massachusetts. He became a teacher at the school in 1929 and director of physical education in 1954. He died on December 22, 1970, at Sancta Maria Hospital in Cambridge.

In 1971, Kozlowsky was inducted into the Boston College Varsity Club Athletic Hall of Fame.
