= Darby Lowery =

American football and baseball player (1894–1982)

Profile
- Positions: Guard, end, tackle

Personal information
- Born: January 30, 1894; Blooming Grove, Ohio
- Died: August 1, 1982 (aged 88); Geneva, New York
- Listed height: 6 ft 0 in (1.83 m)
- Listed weight: 213 lb (97 kg)

Career information
- College: Oberlin

Career history
- Massillon Tigers; Rochester Jeffersons (1920–1925)

Chester A. "Darby" Lowery (January 30, 1894 – August 1982) was an American football and baseball player.

Lowery was born in 1894 in Blooming Grove, Ohio. He attended and played college football at Oberlin.

He played professional football for the Massillon Tigers in the 1910s. When the National Football League was formed in 1920, he joined the Rochester Jeffersons. He played six seasons for Rochester from 1920 to 1925, appearing in 36 NFL games.

Lowery also played professional baseball. He signed with Columbus of the American Association in 1914 and played there from 1914 to 1916. He was traded to Toronto but did not report. He also played for the Seneca Falls semipro team in the 1920s. Lowery worked as an insurance executive. He died in 1982 in Geneva, New York.
