= Frank Matteo =

American football player (1896–1983)

No. 15, 6, 7
- Position: Tackle

Personal information
- Born: April 2, 1896; Syracuse, New York, U.S.
- Died: December 19, 1983 (aged 87); Oneida, New York, U.S.
- Listed height: 5 ft 11 in (1.80 m)
- Listed weight: 195 lb (88 kg)

Career information
- High school: North (Syracuse)
- College: Syracuse

Career history
- Rochester Jeffersons (1922–1925)
- Stats at Pro Football Reference

Francis Pasquale Matteo (April 2, 1896 – December 19, 1983) was an American football tackle who played four seasons with the Rochester Jeffersons of the National Football League (NFL). He played college football at Syracuse University and attended North High School in Syracuse, New York.
