= Joe Bernstein (American football) =

American football player (1893–1967)

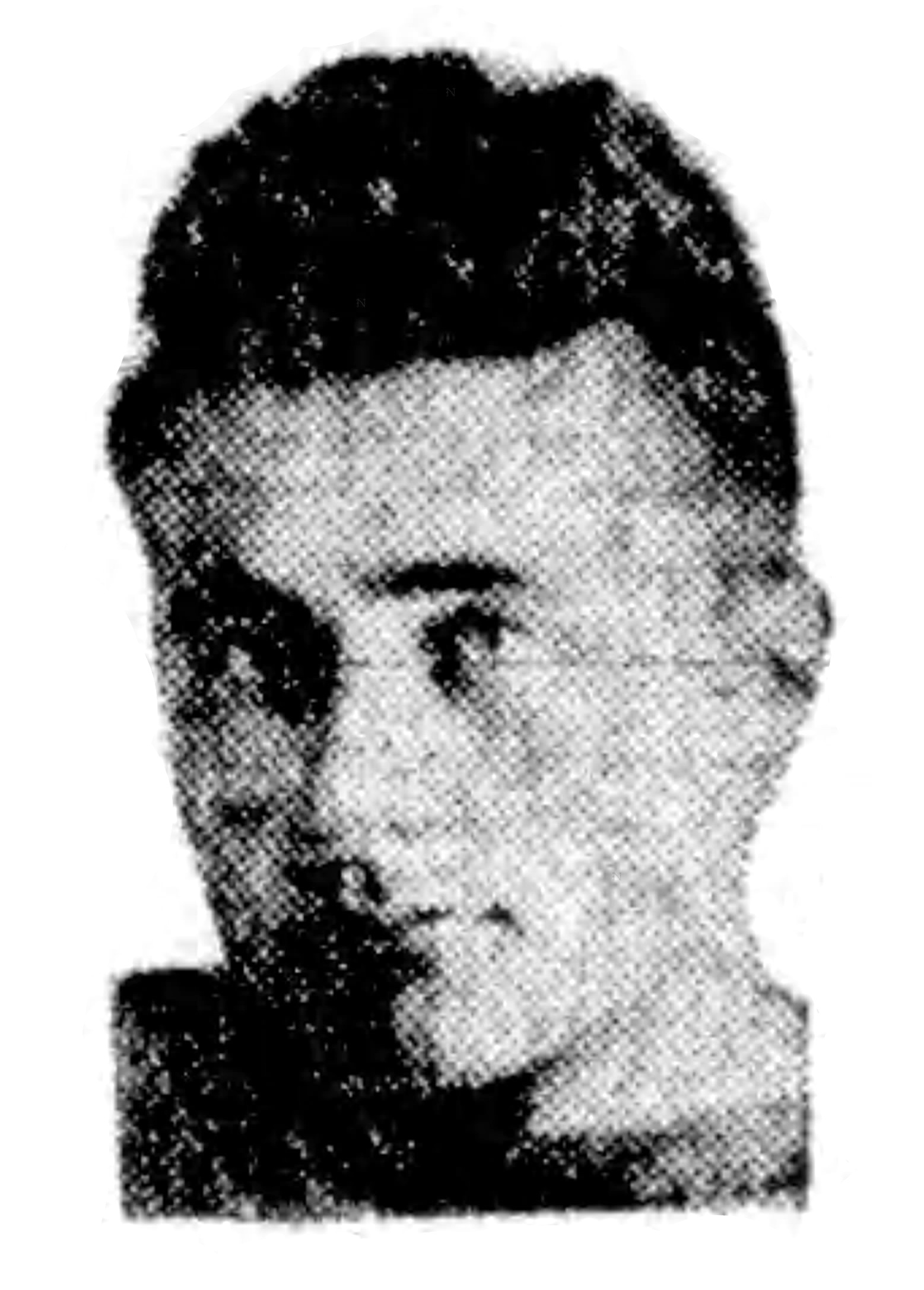
- Bernstein on the 1916 LSU Tigers team

Profile
- Positions: Guard, Tackle, Fullback

Personal information
- Born: November 23, 1893; Elmira, NY, United States
- Died: March 28, 1967 (aged 73); Orange, NJ, United States
- Listed height: 6 ft 0 in (1.83 m)
- Listed weight: 210 lb (95 kg)

Career information
- College: Louisiana State University, University of Tulsa

Career history
- New York Brickley Giants (1921); Rock Island Independents (1923–1924)
- Stats at Pro Football Reference

Joseph G. Bernstein (aka Joe Burten) was an American professional football player and magazine editor. He played in the National Football League with the Rock Island Independents and the New York Brickley Giants.

Bernstein played college football at Louisiana State University. There he lettered three times in 1915, 1916 and 1919.

Under the names Joe Burten or "Cap'n Joey" he edited a series of New York magazines in the 1920s and 1930s.
