= Johnny Milton =

American football player (1898–1949)

Profile
- Position: End / Back

Personal information
- Born: November 9, 1898; Kansas, U.S.
- Died: May 16, 1949 (aged 50); Los Angeles, California, U.S.
- Listed height: 5 ft 8 in (1.73 m)
- Listed weight: 175 lb (79 kg)

Career information
- College: USC

Career history
- Milwaukee Badgers (1923); St. Louis All-Stars (1923); Kansas City Blues (1924)

Career statistics
- Games played: 15
- Stats at Pro Football Reference

John William Milton (November 11, 1898 – May 16, 1949) was an American football player who played professionally in the National Football League (NFL). He split the 1923 NFL season between the Milwaukee Badgers and the St. Louis All-Stars before playing the following season with the Kansas City Blues.
