= Tom Murphy (American football) =

American football player (1901–1994)

Profile
- Position: Tailback / Halfback

Personal information
- Born: June 21, 1901; Eau Claire, Wisconsin
- Died: July 24, 1994 (aged 93); Duluth, Minnesota
- Listed height: 5 ft 8 in (1.73 m)
- Listed weight: 165 lb (75 kg)

Career information
- College: Wisconsin-Superior

Career history
- Milwaukee Badgers (1926)

Career statistics
- Games played: 8
- Stats at Pro Football Reference

Thomas Dwight Murphy (June 21, 1901 – July 24, 1994) was a player in the National Football League. He played for the Milwaukee Badgers during the 1926 NFL season.
