= Bob Foster (American football, born 1886) =

American football player (1886–1948)

Profile
- Position: Halfback

Personal information
- Born: October 15, 1886; Racine, Wisconsin, US
- Died: September 3, 1948 (aged 61)
- Listed height: 5 ft 10 in (1.78 m)
- Listed weight: 192 lb (87 kg)

Career history
- Racine Legion (1922–1923); Milwaukee Badgers (1924)
- Stats at Pro Football Reference

John Robbins Foster (October 15, 1886 – September 3, 1948) was a halfback in the National Football League. He played two seasons with the Racine Legion before playing his final season with the Milwaukee Badgers.
