= Paul Liston =

American football player (1903–1952)

Profile
- Position: Guard

Personal information
- Born: July 3, 1903; Pennsylvania, U.S.
- Died: August 14, 1952 (aged 49); Bradenton, Florida, U.S.
- Listed height: 5 ft 11 in (1.80 m)
- Listed weight: 185 lb (84 kg)

Career information
- High school: Washington (PA)
- College: Georgetown

Career history
- Newark Tornadoes (1930)

Career NFL statistics
- Games played: 1
- Stats at Pro Football Reference

Edward Paul Jones Liston Jr. (July 3, 1903 – August 14, 1952) was an American professional football player who played in the National Football League (NFL) in 1930 for the Newark Tornadoes, appearing in one game. He died in Bradenton, Florida on August 14, 1952.
