= Harry McGee (American football) =

American football player (1905–1983)

Personal information
- Born: April 27, 1905; Stockton, Kansas, U.S.
- Died: December 7, 1982 (aged 77); Pinellas County, Florida, U.S.
- Listed height: 6 ft 1 in (1.85 m)
- Listed weight: 198 lb (90 kg)

Career information
- College: Kansas State

Career history
- Cleveland Bulldogs (1927); Staten Island Stapletons (1929); Newark Tornadoes (1930); Staten Island Stapletons (1931)

Awards and highlights
- First-team All-MVC (1925)

Career statistics
- Games played: 14
- Stats at Pro Football Reference

Harry Lloyd McGee (April 27, 1905 – October 28, 1983) was an American football player. He played college football for Kansas State and professional football in the National Football League (NFL) for the Cleveland Bulldogs (1927), Staten Island Stapletons (1929, 1931), Newark Tornadoes (1930). He appeared in 14 NFL games, six as a starter.
