= Howie Parker =

American football player (1926–2009)

- Howie Parker

No. 66
- Position: Blocking back

Personal information
- Born: August 23, 1926; Greenville, Texas
- Died: December 8, 2009 (aged 83); Tyler, Texas
- Listed height: 6 ft 2 in (1.88 m)
- Listed weight: 220 lb (100 kg)

Career information
- High school: John Tyler (TX)
- College: SMU

Career history
- New York Yankees (1948)

Career statistics
- Games: 4
- Stats at Pro Football Reference

Howard Ingram Parker (August 23, 1926 – December 8, 2009) was an American football player who played at the blocking back position. He played college football for SMU and professional football for the New York Yankees.

== Early life ==
Parker was born in 1926 in Greenville, Texas. He attended and played football at John Tyler High School in Tyler, Texas. He won the T. B. Butler award as the team's most valuable player in 1944.

== College football and military service ==
Parker served in the United States Navy during World War II. After the war, he played college football for SMU in 1946 and 1947. He was a member of the 1947 SMU Mustangs football team that won the Southwest Conference championship and tied with Penn State in the 1948 Cotton Bowl Classic.

== Professional football ==
He played professional football in the All-America Football Conference (AAFC) for the New York Yankees during the 1948 season. He appeared in a total of four games for the Yankees.

== Family and later years ==
Parker was married to Frances Bass after being discharged from the Navy. After retiring from football, he returned to Tyler, Texas, where he worked at a furniture store and later as building superintendent for First Baptist Church of Tyler. He was also a deacon at the church. He died in 2009 at age 83.
