= Fritz Roeseler =

American football player (1897–1985)

Profile
- Position: End

Personal information
- Born: October 1, 1897; Milwaukee, Wisconsin, US
- Died: July 18, 1985 (aged 87); Milwaukee, Wisconsin, US
- Listed height: 6 ft 1 in (1.85 m)
- Listed weight: 189 lb (86 kg)

Career information
- High school: North Division (WI)
- College: North Central University, Marquette

Career history
- Racine Legion (1922–1924); Milwaukee Badgers 1925

Career NFL statistics
- Games played: 26
- Games started: 17
- Receiving touchdowns: 1
- Stats at Pro Football Reference

Frederick Carl "Fritz" Roeseler (October 1, 1897–July 18, 1985) was an American football end for the Racine Legion and the Milwaukee Badgers of the National Football League (NFL) from 1922 to 1925. He played at the collegiate level at North Central University and Marquette.

== Biography ==
Roeseler was born on October 1, 1897, in Milwaukee, Wisconsin. He died there on July 18, 1985.
