= Emil Mayer (American football) =

American football player (1902–1962)

Profile
- Position: End

Personal information
- Born: September 7, 1902; East Liverpool, Ohio, U.S.
- Died: January 12, 1962 (aged 59)
- Listed height: 6 ft 0 in (1.83 m)
- Listed weight: 190 lb (86 kg)

Career information
- High school: East Liverpool (OH)
- College: Bethany (WV), Catholic

Career history
- Pottsville Maroons (1927); Portsmouth Spartans (1930)
- Stats at Pro Football Reference

Emil Leroy Mayer (September 7, 1902 – January 12, 1962) was an American football player. He played college football for Bethany (WV) and Catholic University and in the National Football League (NFL) as an end for the Pottsville Maroons in 1927 and the Portsmouth Spartans in 1930. He appeared in 11 NFL games, three as a starter.
