= Ben Clime =

American football player (1891–1973)

Profile
- Position: Guard

Personal information
- Born: October 14, 1891; Philadelphia, Pennsylvania, U.S.
- Died: January 13, 1973 (aged 81); Fort Lauderdale, Florida, U.S.
- Listed height: 5 ft 11 in (1.80 m)
- Listed weight: 190 lb (86 kg)

Career information
- High school: Central (Philadelphia)
- College: Swarthmore

Career history
- Rochester Jeffersons (1920–1921)
- Stats at Pro Football Reference

Benjamin Sidney Clime (October 14, 1891 – January 13, 1973) was an American professional football guard who played two seasons in the American Professional Football Association (APFA) with the Rochester Jeffersons. He played college football at Swarthmore College.

== Early life and college ==
Benjamin Sidney Clime was born on October 14, 1891, in Philadelphia, Pennsylvania. He attended Central High School in Philadelphia.

Clime played college football for the Swarthmore Quakers of Swarthmore College, with his final year being in 1914. On November 16, 1912, the Quakers beat Bucknell 14–13. A report published a few days after the game noted that "Ben Clime saved the day for Swathmore. The lanky Captain was a whole team in himself. Time and again he tore through the line for good gains and his dashes around the end were the feature. He gained over half of the ground made by his team, and also put up a wonderful game on the defense. His playing Saturday placed him in line for a place on the All-American team this year." Clime was a multi-year team captain while at Swathmore.

== Professional career ==
Clime played in six games for the Rochester Jeffersons during the inaugural season of the American Professional Football Association in 1920 and was listed as a guard. The team went 6–3–2 that year. Clime appeared in one game for the Jeffersons as an end in 1921. He stood 5'11" and weighed 190 pounds during his pro football career.

== Personal life ==
Clime died on January 13, 1973, in Fort Lauderdale, Florida.
