= Jim Welsh =

American football player (1902–1958)

No. 6, 19, 24
- Position: Offensive lineman: Place kicker

Personal information
- Born: September 17, 1902; Malden, Massachusetts, U.S.
- Died: February 12, 1958 (aged 55); Lake County, Florida, U.S.
- Listed height: 5 ft 11 in (1.80 m)
- Listed weight: 250 lb (113 kg)

Career information
- College: Colgate University

Career history
- Rochester Jeffersons (1923); Frankford Yellow Jackets (1924–1925); Pottsville Maroons (1926)

Awards and highlights
- 1x Collyers Eye Mag.: 2nd team all-NFL (1924); 1x Collyers Eye Mag.: 1st team all-NFL (1926)
- Stats at Pro Football Reference

James Edward Welsh (September 17, 1902 – February 12, 1958) was an American professional football player during the early years of the National Football League (NFL). He was an offensive lineman and a place kicker. A graduate of Colgate University, Welsh began his professional career in 1923 with the NFL's Rochester Jeffersons. The following two seasons, were then spent with the Frankford Yellow Jackets. In 1926, Welsh joined the Pottsville Maroons. He then ended the 1926 season tied for the league lead in extra points, with 10.
