= George Rogge =

American football player (1907–1997)

Profile
- Position: End

Personal information
- Born: September 3, 1907; Odebolt, Iowa
- Died: July 14, 1997 (aged 89); Marion County, Florida
- Listed height: 6 ft 0 in (1.83 m)
- Listed weight: 186 lb (84 kg)

Career information
- High school: Ida Grove (IA)
- College: Iowa

Career history
- Chicago Cardinals (1931–1933); St. Louis Gunners (1934)

Career statistics
- Receiving yards: 100
- Touchdowns: 1
- Games: 24
- Stats at Pro Football Reference

George Ross Rogge (September 3, 1907 – July 14, 1997) was an American football player.

Rogge was born in 1907 at Odebolt, Iowa. He attended high school in Ida Grove, Iowa. He played college football for Iowa in 1929 and 1930. He also played professional football in the National Football League (NFL) as an end for the Chicago Cardinals from 1931 to 1933 and for the St. Louis Gunners in 1934. He appeared in 24 NFL games, seven as a starter.

After his football career ended, Rogge worked as a telephone company engineer. He also served in the Navy during World War II. He died in 1997 at the Palm Garden Nursing Home in Ocala, Florida.
