= Red Quigley =

American football player (1895–1966)

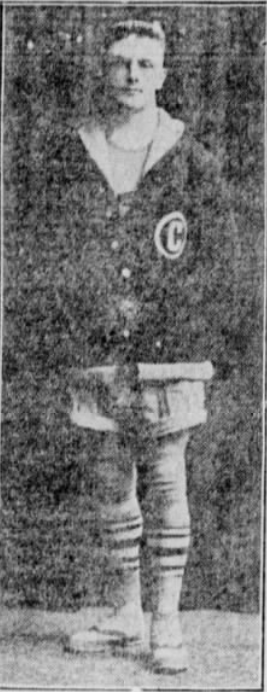
- Quigley pictured in the Democrat and Chronicle, 1916

No. 14
- Position: Quarterback

Personal information
- Born: December 18, 1895; Rochester, New York, U.S.
- Died: September 21, 1966 (aged 70); Rochester, New York, U.S.
- Listed height: 5 ft 9 in (1.75 m)
- Listed weight: 155 lb (70 kg)

Career information
- High school: Cathedral (NY)
- College: none

Career history
- Rochester Jeffersons (1919–1920); Rochester Scalpers (1921); Regal Athletic Club (1922)

Career statistics
- Games played: 9
- Games started: 1
- Stats at Pro Football Reference

Gerald A. Quigley (December 18, 1895 – September 21, 1966) was an American football quarterback who played one season in the American Professional Football Association (APFA) and one in the New York Pro Football League (NYPFL) for the Rochester Jeffersons. He did not play college football.

Quigley was born on December 18, 1895, in Rochester, New York. He was the son of Rochester's chief of police. He attended Cathedral High School in Rochester, starring in baseball, football, track, and basketball. After graduating, Quigley declined scholarship offers from eight different universities and played semi-professional sports with the "Saturday Evening Post Posts" in basketball, and the Crimsons and the Kodak Park team in baseball.

He was drafted to serve in World War I in 1917, and was a member of the United States Navy. While there, he played on "Cupid Black's naval eleven", where "one had to have class to make the team of husky pigskin maulers which Black had together".

After returning, Quigley played professional football with the Rochester Jeffersons of the New York Pro Football League (NYPFL) in 1919, being their starting quarterback and leading them to the league championship.

He returned to the Jeffersons for the 1920 season, while they were a member of the newly-formed American Professional Football Association (APFA). The Buffalo Courier called him "one of the most spectacular broken field runners that ever stepped on a field in this state." During the 1920 season, he appeared in nine out of eleven total games, starting one. The Jeffersons ended the year with a 6–3–2 record, seventh in league standings.

He left the Jeffersons in 1921, playing for the independent Rochester Scalpers. He was a member of the Regal Athletic Club football team in 1922.

In 1924, he played for a semi-professional baseball team called the "Old Timers".

Quigley later worked at the Rochester Recreation Bureau for 29 years, and was a recreation leader at Danforth Center for ten years before retiring in 1966. He also was an assistant high school football coach in the late 1940s. He died on September 21, 1966, at the age of 70.

The Democrat and Chronicle called Quigley, "one of Rochester's most celebrated former athletes."
