= Jack McArthur =

American football player (born 1902)

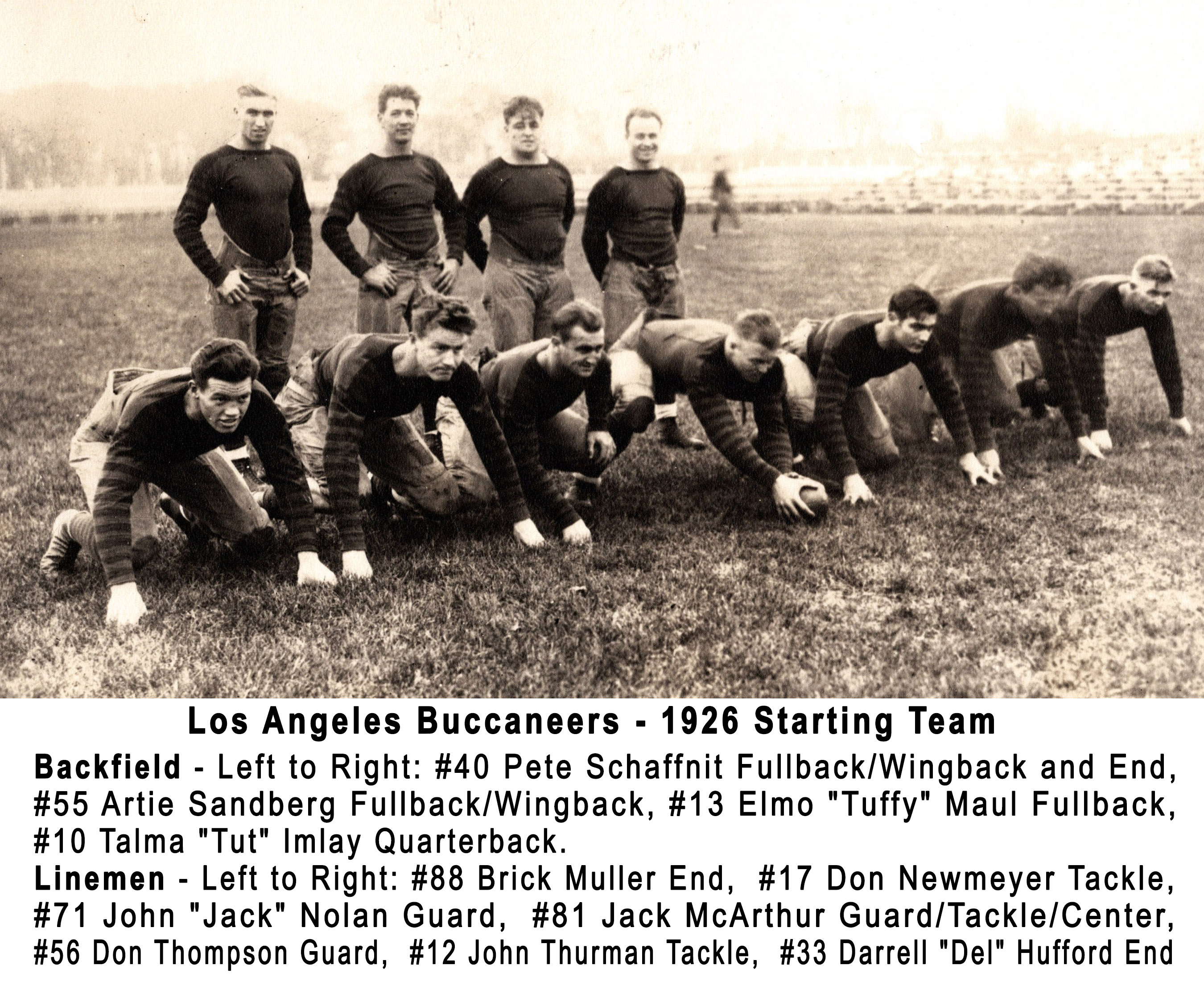

No. 81 (Buccaneers), 1 (Bisons), 33 (Yankees), O (Orange), 19 (Steamroller)
- Position: Center

Personal information
- Born: May 30, 1902; Acampo, California, US
- Died: Unknown
- Listed height: 5 ft 11 in (1.80 m)
- Listed weight: 211 lb (96 kg)

Career information
- College: St. Mary's

Career history
- Los Angeles Buccaneers (1926); New York Yankees (1927); Buffalo Bisons (1927); New York Yankees (1928); Orange Tornadoes (1929); Frankford Yellow Jackets (1930); Newark Tornadoes (1930); Brooklyn Dodgers (1930); Providence Steamroller (1930–1931); Chicago Bears (1933)
- Stats at Pro Football Reference

Ira Jackson McArthur (born May 30, 1902, date of death unknown) was an American professional football player in the National Football League (NFL). He made his NFL debut in 1926 with the Los Angeles Buccaneers. Over the course of his six-year career, Jack played for the Chicago Bears, Providence Steam Roller, Buffalo Bisons, New York Yankees, Los Angeles Buccaneers, Frankford Yellow Jackets, Newark Tornadoes, Brooklyn Dodgers and the Orange Tornadoes.

Upon retiring from football, he embarked on a professional wrestling career, with matches as early as 1934 and as late as 1960. Opponents included Bruno Sammartino. There is also a video recording of a televised match in 1959 between McArthur and Happy Humphrey, who's recognized as the heaviest wrestler of all time.

His date of death is unknown.
