= Hippo Gozdowski =

American football player (1902–1952)

Profile
- Positions: Fullback, guard, center

Personal information
- Born: March 26, 1902; Chicago, Illinois, U.S.
- Died: September 19, 1952 (aged 50); Toledo, Ohio, U.S.

Career history
- Toledo Maroons (1922)
- Stats at Pro Football Reference

Casimir "Hippo" Gozdowski (March 26, 1902 – September 19, 1952) was an American football fullback for the Toledo Maroons of the National Football League. Nicknamed "Hippo" because of his large size, Gozdowski was a well-known athlete in Toledo, playing professional and semi-professional football and baseball for many years in the city.

== Early life ==
Casimir Gozdowski was born on March 26, 1902, in Chicago, Illinois, but had moved to Toledo, Ohio by the time he reached his twenties.

== Football career ==
In 1922, Gozdowski played for the Toledo Maroons of the National Football League, which at the time was only three years old and had just begun to call itself the NFL.

Gozdowski had not played college football, unlike most of the starters on the team. He played backup to starting right guard Cap Edwards.

Gozdowski's most prolific game saw him score two rushing touchdowns in a 39–0 rout of the Louisville Brecks, in which the Brecks failed to even get a first down.

== Baseball career ==
In 1925, Gozdowski played pitcher for a Toledo semi-professional baseball team called the Eagles. Described as "a big Polish boy" and likened to Babe Ruth by the Sandusky Star-Journal, he was considered far and away the best player on the team.

== Later life and death ==
Gozdowski died in Toledo on September 19, 1952, at the age of 50.
