= Moose Cochran =

American football player (1897–1979)

Profile
- Position: End

Personal information
- Born: June 9, 1897; Wheaton, Illinois, U.S.
- Died: May 10, 1979 (aged 81); Wheaton, Illinois, U.S.
- Listed height: 6 ft 0 in (1.83 m)
- Listed weight: 195 lb (88 kg)

Career information
- College: Chicago

Career history
- Milwaukee Badgers (1922)

Career NFL statistics
- Games played: 2
- Stats at Pro Football Reference

Stuart Wainwright "Moose" Cochran (June 6, 1897 – May 10, 1979) was an American football end for the Milwaukee Badgers of the National Football League (NFL).
