= Ralph Marston =

American football player (1907–1967)

Profile
- Position: Quarterback

Personal information
- Born: February 16, 1907; Malden, Massachusetts, U.S.
- Died: December 7, 1967 (aged 60); Manchester, New Hampshire, U.S.
- Listed height: 5 ft 9 in (1.75 m)
- Listed weight: 170 lb (77 kg)

Career information
- High school: Malden (MA)
- College: Boston University

Career history
- Boston Bulldogs (1929)
- Stats at Pro Football Reference

Ralph Fulsom "Red" Marston (February 16, 1907 − December 7, 1967) was an American football player.

Marston was born in 1907 in Malden, Massachusetts, and attended Malden High School. He played college football at Boston University. He later played one game in the National Football League with the Boston Bulldogs in 1929.

For more than three decades, Marston worked for the American Mutual Insurance Company. He lived in Pembroke, New Hampshire, from 1951 until his death in 1967.
