= Buck MacDonald =

Canadian gridiron football player (1894–1985)

Profile
- Position: Guard

Personal information
- Born: June 5, 1894; Pictou, Nova Scotia, Canada
- Died: March 1, 1985 (aged 90); Miami Springs, Florida, U.S.

Career information
- College: Lehigh

Career history
- 1920–21: Canton Bulldogs
- 1921: New York Brickley Giants
- 1921: Tonawanda Kardex
- Stats at Pro Football Reference

George Glover "Buck" MacDonald (June 5, 1894 – March 1, 1985) was an American football guard in the National Football League (NFL) for the Canton Bulldogs, New York Brickley Giants and the Tonawanda Kardex. He attended Lehigh University. Buck was the first Nova Scotian NFL player.
