= Peter Blackbear =

American football player (1899–1976)

Profile
- Position: End

Personal information
- Born: October 11, 1899; Oklahoma Territory, U.S.
- Died: July 1976 (aged 76); Salina, Oklahoma, U.S.
- Listed height: 6 ft 0 in (1.83 m)
- Listed weight: 190 lb (86 kg)

Career information
- College: None

Career history
- Oorang Indians (1923)

Career NFL statistics
- Games played: 2
- Games started: 1
- Stats at Pro Football Reference

Coowee Scoorice Black Bear (October 11, 1899 – July 1976) was an American professional football player who played in the National Football League (NFL) as an end with the Oorang Indians during the 1923 season. The Indians were a team based in LaRue, Ohio, composed only of Native Americans, and coached by Jim Thorpe.

Black Bear was born in Oklahoma Territory and died in Salina, Oklahoma.
