= Jack Corcoran (American football) =

American football player (1904–1987)

- Jack Corcoran, 1934

Profile
- Positions: Guard, center

Personal information
- Born: June 13, 1904; St. Paul, Minnesota, U.S.
- Died: January 8, 1987 (aged 82); Encinitas, California, U.S.
- Listed weight: 180 lb (82 kg)

Career information
- High school: Mechanic Arts (MN)
- College: St. Thomas, Saint Louis

Career history
- Minneapolis Red Jackets (1930)

John Waldon Corcoran (June 13, 1904 – January 8, 1987) was an American football player. He played college football for St. Thomas in 1928 and Saint Louis in 1929, and in the National Football League (NFL) as a center and guard for the Minneapolis Red Jackets in 1930. He appeared in five NFL games, starting three of them. He later became a coach.
