= Bill Howell (American football) =

Canadian gridiron football player (1905–1981)

Profile
- Position: End

Personal information
- Born: April 21, 1905; Bath, New Brunswick, Canada
- Died: August 23, 1981 (aged 76); Washington, DC, United States
- Listed height: 5 ft 11 in (1.80 m)
- Listed weight: 175 lb (79 kg)

Career information
- College: The Catholic University of America

Career history
- Boston Bulldogs (1929)
- Stats at Pro Football Reference

Wilfred Daniel Howell was a professional football player who spent 1 season in the National Football League with the Boston Bulldogs in 1929.
