= Chet Widerquist =

American football player (1895–1976)

Chester C. Widerquist
Profile
- Position: G/T

Personal information
- Born: September 23, 1895; Moline, Illinois
- Died: July 14, 1976 (aged 80)
- Listed height: 6 ft 1 in (1.85 m)
- Listed weight: 219 lb (99 kg)

Career information
- College: Washington & Jefferson College, Northwestern University

Career history
- Milwaukee Badgers (1923–1924); Rock Island Independents (1925); Chicago Cardinals (1926); Rock Island Independents (1926); Chicago Cardinals (1928); Detroit Wolverines (1928); Minneapolis Red Jackets (1929)

Awards and highlights
- Second-team All-American (1923)
- Stats at Pro Football Reference

Chester C. Widerquist (September 23, 1895 - July 14, 1976) was an American professional football player in the National Football League (NFL) for the Milwaukee Badgers, Rock Island Independents, Chicago Cardinals, Detroit Wolverines and Minneapolis Red Jackets. He attended Washington & Jefferson College, and Northwestern University.

== See also ==
- 1923 College Football All-America Team

== Notes ==
- Career statistics from NFL.com · Pro Football Reference ·
