= Bob Lundell =

American athlete (1907–1993)

Profile
- Position: End

Personal information
- Born: June 21, 1907; Pueblo, Colorado
- Died: July 7, 1993 (aged 86); McAllen, Texas
- Listed height: 6 ft 4 in (1.93 m)
- Listed weight: 215 lb (98 kg)

Career information
- High school: Edison (MN)
- College: Gustavus Adolphus

Career history
- Minneapolis Red Jackets (1929-1930); Staten Island Stapletons (1930)

Wilbur Harvey Lundell (June 21, 1907 – July 7, 1993), sometimes known as Bob Lundell or "Brute" Lundell, was an American football, baseball, and basketball player.

Lundell was born in Pueblo, Colorado, in 1907. He attended Edison High School in Minneapolis and Gustavus Adolphus College in St. Peter, Minnesota. He was an all-round athlete at Gustavus Adolphus, playing end on the football team, center on the basketball team, and as a first baseman for the baseball team. He attended Gustavus Adolphus for three years, leaving in the summer of 1928 to attend the University of Minnesota. He led Gustavus Adolphus to its first Minnesota College Conference championship in 1926.

He later played professional football in the National Football League (NFL) as an end and punter for the Minneapolis Red Jackets (1929-1930) and Staten Island Stapletons (1930). He appeared in 20 NFL games, 16 of them as a starter. He scored one touchdown, for the Red Jackets in 1930.

He also played professional baseball for Belle Plaine in 1927, in the St. Louis Cardinals farm system, and for St. Cloud starting in 1931.

He also remained active in basketball, playing center for the Raferts in the Minneapolis A.A.U. basketball league.

Lundell lived in McAllen, Texas, from 1972. He died in 1993 at the Rio Grande Regional Hospital in McAllen at age 86.
