= Jim Kane (American football) =

American football player (1896–1976)

Profile
- Position: Guard

Personal information
- Born: November 28, 1896; Rochester, New York, U.S.
- Died: April 10, 1976 (aged 79); Rochester, New York, U.S.
- Listed height: 5 ft 11 in (1.80 m)
- Listed weight: 200 lb (91 kg)

Career history
- Rochester Jeffersons (1920)
- Stats at Pro Football Reference

Harold James Kane (November 28, 1896 – April 10, 1976) was an American football guard who played one season in the American Professional Football Association (APFA) with the Rochester Jeffersons.
