= Mike Gavagan =

American football player (1900–1957)

Profile
- Position: Fullback

Personal information
- Born: April 10, 1900; Warsaw, New York
- Died: January 9, 1957 (aged 56); Warsaw, New York
- Listed height: 5 ft 10 in (1.78 m)
- Listed weight: 176 lb (80 kg)

Career information
- High school: Warsaw
- College: St. Bonaventure

Career history
- Rochester Jeffersons (1923)

Career statistics
- Games: 2

Maurice Thomas "Mike" Gavagan (April 10, 1900 – January 9, 1957) was an American football player.

Gavagan was born in 1900 in Warsaw, New York. He played college football for St. Bonaventure and later played professional football a fullback for the Rochester Jeffersons in the National Football League (NFL). He appeared in two NFL games, both as a starter, during the 1923 season.

After retiring from football, Gavagan worked as a construction engineer. He served with the U.S. Navy Seabees in the Pacific theater during World War II. He died in 1957 at Wyoming County Community Hospital in Warsaw, New York.
