= Will Norman =

American football player (1903–1964)

Will "Toad" Norman
Profile
- Position: Halfback / Fullback

Personal information
- Born: September 22, 1903; Braddock, Pennsylvania
- Died: July 1964 (age 60)
- Listed height: 6 ft 0 in (1.83 m)
- Listed weight: 175 lb (79 kg)

Career information
- College: Washington & Jefferson

Career history
- Pottsville Maroons (1928); Orange Tornadoes (1929)
- Stats at Pro Football Reference

Willard Patterson "Toad" Norman (September 22, 1903 – July 1964) was a professional football player who played in 1928 for the Pottsville Maroons of the National Football League. He was also on the 1929 roster for the Orange Tornadoes. Norman attended and played his college football at Washington & Jefferson College.

== See also ==
- Lists of American football players

== Notes ==
- Career statistics from NFL.com · Pro Football Reference ·
