= Ave Kaplan =

American football player (1899–1989)

Profile
- Positions: Halfback, quarterback

Personal information
- Born: November 16, 1899; Owatonna, Minnesota
- Died: December 28, 1989 (aged 90); Birmingham, Alabama
- Listed height: 5 ft 9 in (1.75 m)
- Listed weight: 165 lb (75 kg)

Career information
- High school: Owatonna (MN)
- College: Hamline

Career history
- Minneapolis Marines (1923)

Career statistics
- Games: 8
- Stats at Pro Football Reference

Avold R. Kaplan (November 16, 1899 – December 28, 1989) was an American football player.

Kaplan was born in 1899 in Owatonna, Minnesota. He attended high school in Owatonna and at the Pillsbury Academy. He starred for the Pillsbury football team in 1918. He played college football as the quarterback for Hamline University in Saint Paul, Minnesota. As a freshman in 1919, he won the job as Hamlin's quarterback and won all-state honors. He repeated as the all-state quarterback in 1920. He was the captain of Hamline's 1922 team. He was known for his open field running and led Hamline to a conference championship in 1922. He won all-state honors three times at the quarterback position.

Kaplan then played professional football in the National Football League (NFL) as a halfback and quarterback for the Minneapolis Marines in 1923 and for the Rock Island Independents in 1926. He appeared in a total of 17 NFL games, 12 of them as a starter.

Kaplan also played baseball for Hamline and in the Southern Minnesota League.

Kaplan died in 1989 at Birmingham, Alabama.
