= Joe Burks =

American football player (1899–1968)

No. 4
- Position: Center

Personal information
- Born: July 8, 1899; Houma, Louisiana, U.S.
- Died: July 6, 1968 (aged 68); Yakima, Washington, U.S.
- Listed height: 5 ft 10 in (1.78 m)
- Listed weight: 171 lb (78 kg)

Career information
- College: Washington State

Career history
- Milwaukee Badgers (1926)

Career NFL statistics
- Games played: 9
- Stats at Pro Football Reference

Joe Burks (July 8, 1899 – July 6, 1968) was an American professional football player who was a center in the National Football League (NFL). He played with the Milwaukee Badgers during the 1926 NFL season.
