= Manny Rapp =

American football player (1908–1965)

No. 65, 67
- Positions: Quarterback, running back

Personal information
- Born: September 17, 1908; Pevely, Missouri, U.S.
- Died: May 17, 1965 (aged 56); St. Louis, Missouri, U.S.
- Listed height: 6 ft 0 in (1.83 m)
- Listed weight: 215 lb (98 kg)

Career information
- High school: Herculaneum (MO)
- College: St. Louis

Career history
- St. Louis Gunners (1934, 1937); Cleveland Rams (1942)

Career statistics
- Games played: 4
- Games started: 3
- Pass attempts: 16
- Pass completions: 6
- Passing touchdowns: 1
- Passing interceptions: 6
- Rushing attempts: 15
- Rushing yards: 67
- Stats at Pro Football Reference

Manuel Warren Rapp (September 17, 1908 – May 17, 1965) was an American football quarterback and running back who played three seasons for the St. Louis Gunners and Cleveland Rams of the National Football League (NFL).

== Early life and education ==
Manny Rapp was born on September 17, 1908, in Pevely, Missouri. He attended Herculaneum (MO) High School. Rapp went to Saint Louis University for college and played football there. He lettered in 1932 and 1933 before playing professionally.

== Professional career ==
In 1934, Rapp played for the St. Louis Gunners of the National Football League (NFL). The Gunners had replaced the Cincinnati Reds who had their franchise suspended. He wore number 65. He was the starting quarterback and running back in all three games. He attempted 16 passes, completing 6 of them, for 175 yards and a touchdown. His one touchdown pass was a 56-yard completion to Paul Moss, which came against the Detroit Lions in a 40 to 7 loss. Even though he had only played 3 games in a 13 game schedule, he was top 10 in interceptions thrown with 6. He also had the highest interception percentage in the league, finishing with a 37.5 mark. His rushing statistics included 15 attempts for 67 yards. Rapp would not play again until 1937, when he played in one more game with the Gunners. St. Louis was at this time part of the Midwest Football League. He would cease playing again until 1942, when he made a final return, playing in one game for the Cleveland Rams.

== Death ==
He died on May 17, 1965, in St. Louis, Missouri. He was 56 at the time of his death.
