= Murrell Hogue =

American football player (1904–1990)

Profile
- Positions: Guard, tackle

Personal information
- Born: August 13, 1904; Amarillo, Texas, U.S.
- Died: November 27, 1990 (aged 86); Shreveport, Louisiana, U.S.
- Listed height: 6 ft 1 in (1.85 m)
- Listed weight: 209 lb (95 kg)

Career information
- High school: Powell Training (LA)
- College: Centenary

Career history
- New York Yankees (1928); Chicago Cardinals (1929); Minneapolis Red Jackets (1930)

Murrell Hogue (August 13, 1904 – November 27, 1990) was an American football player.

Hogue was born in 1904 in Amarillo, Texas. He attended Powell Training High School in Shreveport, Louisiana. He played college football as a guard for the 1924 Centenary Gentlemen football team that compiled an 8–1 record under head coach Bo McMillin.

Hogue later played professional football in the National Football League (NFL) as a guard and tackle for the New York Yankees (1928), Chicago Cardinals (1929), and Minneapolis Red Jackets (1930). During the late 1920s, he was "considered one of the best tackles in the National Football League." He appeared in 22 NFL games, 12 as a starter.

Hogue died in 1990 in Shreveport.
