= Walter Lowe =

English cricketer

Walter George Hassall Lowe (born 26 August 1870 in Bretby; details of death unknown) was an English first-class cricketer, who was active in 1895 and played for Nottinghamshire.
