= Dutch Forst =

American football player (1891–1963)

No. 8
- Position: Fullback

Personal information
- Born: February 17, 1891; Derby, Connecticut, United States
- Died: October 5, 1963 (aged 72); Seymour, Connecticut, United States
- Listed height: 5 ft 8 in (1.73 m)
- Listed weight: 195 lb (88 kg)

Career information
- High school: Villanova (PA) Prep
- College: Villanova

Career history
- Hartford Blues (1925); Providence Steam Roller (1926)
- Stats at Pro Football Reference

Arthur Henry Forst (February 17, 1891 – October 5, 1963) was a professional football player in the early National Football League for the Providence Steam Roller. He was also a professional player for the Waterbury Blues (later renamed the Hartford Blues), prior to that team's entry into the NFL in 1926.

== Personal life ==
Forst attended Villanova Preparatory High School before later attending Villanova University a private, Catholic, coeducational, research higher education institute in Villanova, Pennsylvania.

== Football career ==
In 1925 Forst was one of the "top backs" of the Waterbury Blues alongside Ken Simendinger from Holy Cross. In their only NFL contest of 1925, the Blues beat the Rochester Jeffersons 7–6. The Blues went on to begin the 1926 NFL season with several losses, only winning three games that season. Forst is credited with only starting two games, both of which he started in as fullback.

== Death ==
Forst died on October 5, 1963, in Seymour, Connecticut, United States.
