= Ward Meese =

American football player (1897–1968)

Profile
- Position: End

Personal information
- Born: March 9, 1897; Van Wert, Ohio, U.S.
- Died: January 23, 1968 (aged 70); Fort Wayne, Indiana, U.S.
- Listed height: 6 ft 2 in (1.88 m)
- Listed weight: 200 lb (91 kg)

Career information
- College: Wabash

Career history
- Milwaukee Badgers (1922); St. Louis All-Stars (1923); Hammond Pros (1924–1925)

Career statistics
- Games played: 11
- Stats at Pro Football Reference

Ward King Meese (March 9, 1897 – January 23, 1968) was an American football player. He played professionally in the National Football League (NFL) with the Milwaukee Badgers during the 1922 NFL season and the St. Louis All-Stars during the 1923 NFL season before being a member of the Hammond Pros for the following two seasons. He also played for the Decatur Staleys while playing college football at the same time. He played collegiately at Wabash.

The Staleys became the Chicago Bears shortly after he retired. His family included his son Robert Meese who had four children and seven grandchildren. His son Andy Meese played semi-pro football for the Wabash Express before a shoulder injury.
