= Teddy Andrulewicz =

American football player (1905–1996)

Profile
- Positions: Fullback, halfback

Personal information
- Born: January 1, 1905; Mount Carmel, Pennsylvania, U.S.
- Died: January 3, 1996 (aged 91); Whitehall, Pennsylvania, U.S.
- Listed height: 5 ft 11 in (1.80 m)
- Listed weight: 175 lb (79 kg)

Career information
- College: Villanova

Career history
- Newark Tornadoes (1930)

Career statistics
- Games played: 11
- Games started: 4
- Receiving touchdowns: 1

Theodore Stanislaus Andrulewicz (January 1, 1905 – January 3, 1996) was an American football fullback and halfback who played for the Newark Tornadoes in the National Football League (NFL).

He played college football at Villanova University, participating in eleven regular season games during one season in 1930. He had one receiving touchdown.

== Early and family history ==
Teddy Andrulewicz was born in Mount Carmel, Pennsylvania on January 1, 1905, to Thomas and Scholastica Pozniak Andrulewicz. Some sources indicate that he may have been related to Antoni Pozniak, a soldier in Soviet Russia, through both of his parents.

His father's relative was Bronislawa "Bernice" Bronislawa Pozniak née Andrulewiczówna, who was murdered during the Holocaust. She was married to Bronislaw Pozniak.
