= Howard Turner =

American football player and coach (1897–1976)

Profile
- Position: Back

Personal information
- Born: May 4, 1897; Macomb, Illinois, U.S.
- Died: November 17, 1976 (aged 79); Roseburg, Oregon, U.S.
- Listed height: 5 ft 8 in (1.73 m)
- Listed weight: 165 lb (75 kg)

Career information
- College: Lombard

Career history
- Milwaukee Badgers (1923)
- Stats at Pro Football Reference

Howard Hunter Turner (May 4, 1897 – November 17, 1976) was an American football back who played one season with the Milwaukee Badgers of the National Football League (NFL). He played college football at Lombard College. The Jim Turner listed on other sites as having played for the Badgers in 1923 did not likely play for the team.

== Professional career ==
Turner signed with the Milwaukee Badgers in October 1923 and played in three games, starting two, for the team during the 1923 season.

== Coaching career ==
Turner later became a high school football coach in Roseburg, Oregon.
