= Gordon Wallace (American football) =

American football player (1899–1931)

- Wallace in 1922

Profile
- Position: Fullback

Personal information
- Born: August 6, 1899; Warrensburg, New York
- Died: July 9, 1931 (aged 31)
- Listed height: 5 ft 10 in (1.78 m)
- Listed weight: 170 lb (77 kg)

Career information
- High school: East (NY)
- College: Rochester

Career history
- Rochester Jeffersons (1923–1924)

Career statistics
- Games: 3

Gordon Lewis "Sea-Going" Wallace (August 6, 1899 – July 9, 1931) was an American football player. He played college football for the University of Rochester and was captain of the 1922 Rochester football team. He later played professional football a back for the Rochester Jeffersons in the National Football League (NFL). He appeared in three NFL games during the 1923 and 1924 seasons. After retiring from football, he worked as a high school teacher in Rochester. He died in 1932 while inflating a tire that exploded.
