= Deaths in December 1980 =

The following is a list of notable deaths in December 1980.

Entries for each day are listed alphabetically by surname. A typical entry lists information in the following sequence:

- Name, age, country of citizenship at birth, subsequent country of citizenship (if applicable), reason for notability, cause of death (if known), and reference.

== December 1980 ==
=== 1 ===
- Vladimir Alekseev, 48, Soviet mathematician.
- Frank Booth, 70, American Olympic swimmer (1932).
- May Edward Chinn, 84, American physician.
- John Coulter, 92, Irish-Canadian playwright.
- Mel Cummin, 85, American cartoonist and magazine illustrator.
- Forward Pass, 15, American Thoroughbred racehorse.
- Rudolf Hamburger, 77, German architect.
- Kengal Hanumanthaiah, 72, Indian politician, MP (1962–1977).
- Svea Jansson, 76, Finnish-Swedish folk singer.
- Mangharam Udharam Malkani, 83, Indian playwright and literary historian.
- Tom Mason, 60, American actor (Plan 9 from Outer Space)
- Hans-Jacob Mattsson, 90, Swedish Olympic ice hockey player (1920).
- John Herman Randall Jr., 81, American philosopher.
- Shigeru Sawada, 93, Japanese general.
- Zareh Vorpuni, 78, Armenian novelist.

=== 2 ===
- George F. Barrett, 73, American lawyer, Illinois attorney general (1941–1949).
- Harald Bosio, 74, Austrian Olympic skier (1928, 1932, 1936).
- Trevor Eather, 60, Australian rugby player.
- Roza Eskenazi, c. 84–85, Greek dancer and singer.
- Romain Gary, 66, Lithuanian-born French novelist and diplomat, suicide by gunshot.
- Ljubomir Ivanović Gedža, 54, Yugoslav wrestler and wrestling coach.
- Willie Gilbert, 64, American playwright (How to Succeed in Business Without Really Trying)
- Patrick Gordon Walker, 73, British politician, MP (1945–1964, 1966–1974).
- Ole Bjørn Kraft, 86, Danish politician.
- American missionaries murdered in El Salvador:
  - Maura Clarke, 49, shot.
  - Jean Donovan, 27, shot.
  - Ita Ford, 40, shot.
  - Dorothy Kazel, 41, shot.

=== 3 ===
- Baldomiro Benquet, 73, Uruguayan Olympic rower (1936).
- Pranas Čepėnas, 81, Lithuanian-American historian.
- Birtie Maher, 87, American football player.
- Sir Oswald Mosley, 84, British politician and fascist leader (British Union of Fascists), MP (1918–1924, 1926–1931).
- Beatrice Ormsby-Gore, Baroness Harlech, 89, English courtier.
- Marie-Antoinette Tonnelat, 68, French theoretical physicist.
- Eino Virtanen, 72, Finnish wrestler.
- Robert Zimmerman, 99, American-Canadian Olympic swimmer (1908, 1912).

=== 4 ===
- Hamilton Shirley Amerasinghe, 67, Sri Lankan diplomat.
- Jenő Brandi, 67, Hungarian Olympic water polo player (1936, 1948).
- Joe Birch, 76, English footballer.
- Doris P. Buck, 82, American science fiction author, pulmonary embolism.
- Gösta Cederlund, 92, Swedish actor and film director.
- Geoffrey Cooke, 83, English cricketer.
- Dan Curtin, 82, Australian politician, MP (1949–1969).
- Vicente Escudero, 92, Spanish flamenco dancer.
- Al Gebert, 74, American football player and coach.
- Sultan Ibraimov, 53, Soviet Kyrgyz politician, shot.
- James Jones, 99, British Anglican priest.
- Zdeněk Otava, 78, Czech opera singer.
- Georgette Vincent, 52, American baseball player.
- Stanisława Walasiewicz, 69, Polish-born American Olympic track and field athlete (1932, 1936), shot.
- Don Warrington, 32, Canadian football player, traffic collision.
- Victims of the 1980 Camarate plane crash:
  - Snu Abecassis, 40, Danish-Portuguese publisher
  - Adelino Amaro da Costa, 37, Portuguese politician
  - Francisco Sá Carneiro, 46, Portuguese politician, prime minister (since 1980)

=== 5 ===
- Val Chapman, 70, New Zealand botanist and academic administrator.
- Pat Devanny, 67, Australian political activist, drowned.
- Michael J. Halberstam, 58, American cardiologist, shot.
- Eddie Hickey, 77, American college basketball and football coach, heart attack.
- Fidelio Hungo, 87, Cuban baseball player.
- Ernst Idla, 79, Estonian sports coach.
- Ozias Johnson, 70, American college basketball and football coach.
- Gerrit Keizer, 70, Dutch footballer.
- Harvey Peltier Jr., 57, American politician and academic administrator, member of the Louisiana State Senate (1964–1976).
- Susan C. Petrey, 35, American fiction writer.
- Don Taylor, 57, New Zealand cricketer.
- Geoffrey Udal, 72, English cricketer.

=== 6 ===
- Margot Bennett, 68, British novelist and screenwriter.
- C. Irving Benson, 83, Australian pastor.
- Herb Bunker, 84, American college athlete and coach.
- Guy W. Calissi, 71, American politician and jurist.
- Ève Francis, 94, French actress and filmmaker.
- Sir Reginald Graham, 88, British soldier and businessman.
- Li Jinglin, 71, Chinese politician.
- José del Carmen Marín Arista, 81, Peruvian general and academic administrator.
- Sir Roderick McLeod, 75, British general.
- Marlin B. Nelsen, 44, American politician, member of the Minnesota House of Representatives (since 1977), stroke.
- Bernard Paul, 50, French filmmaker.

=== 7 ===
- Beechi, 67, Indian humorist.
- Karl Brunner, 80, German general.
- Gerard Bucknall, 86, British general.
- Darby Crash, 22, American singer (Germs), suicide by heroin overdose.
- Kathryn Crawford, 72, American actress, cancer.
- Synnøve Gleditsch, 72, Norwegian actress.
- Josef Hellensteiner, 91, Austrian Olympic racing cyclist (1912).
- Constance Howard, 74, American actress.
- Ahmad Keshvari, 27, Iranian helicopter pilot, shootdown.
- John Beaver Mertie Jr., 92, American geologist.
- W. L. Morton, 71, Canadian historian, heart attack.
- Jerry Nemer, 68, American basketball player and attorney, leukemia.
- Lennie Pearson, 62, American baseball player.
- Paul Schwegler, 73, American football player and actor.
- Mary Singleton, 54, American politician, cancer.
- Luke Urban, 82, American football and baseball player and coach.

=== 8 ===
- Theo Breuer, 71, German footballer.
- Ed Comstock, 77, American football player.
- Emil Diedt, 83, American race car builder.
- Paul Michael Iogolevitch, 78, Russian-American oil executive and philanthropist.
- George Kerr, 86, American football player.
- John Lennon, 40, English musician (The Beatles, Plastic Ono Band), songwriter ("Imagine", "Give Peace a Chance") and activist, shot.
- Tenis Melngailis, 67, Latvian chess player.
- Robert Nuttall, 74, English footballer.
- Joe Oakley, 66, Australian footballer.
- Hermann Plocher, 79, German general.
- William Ritchie Russell, 77, Scottish neurologist.
- Albert Sadacca, 79, American electrician, popularized electric Christmas lights.
- William T. Simpson, 94, American politician.
- Petar Trifunović, 69, Yugoslav chess player.
- Hoppie van Jaarsveld, 63, South African rugby player.

=== 9 ===
- Kanu Desai, 73, Indian artist and illustrator.
- Maneco Galeano, 35, Paraguayan musician, lung cancer.
- Péter Lázár, 30, Hungarian Olympic swimmer (1968), traffic collision.
- Georges Monnet, 82, French politician.
- Dorise Nielsen, 78, Canadian-Chinese politician, MP (1940–1945), cancer.
- Ted Olson, 68, American baseball player.
- Don Padgett, 69, American baseball player.
- Lyle Reifsnider, 79, American set decorator.
- John Thomas, 84, Irish footballer.

=== 10 ===
- Badrul Alam, 50–51, Bangladeshi physician and academic.
- Benedict I, 88, Greek Orthodox prelate, patriarch of Jerusalem (since 1957), heart attack.
- George W. Chapman, 71, Australian footballer.
- Armand de Turenne, 89, French flying ace.
- Gevheri Sultan, 76, Turkish musician and royal.
- Philip Jaffe, 85, Russian-born American journalist and businessman.
- Philip MacDonald, 80, British writer.
- Rosy Ryan, 82, American baseball player and coach.

=== 11 ===
- Josep Llorens i Artigas, 88, Spanish artist.
- Peter Roy Barber, 53, English-born South African serial killer, execution by hanging.
- John J. Bergen, 85, American businessman.
- Lyne Chardonnet, 37, French actress.
- Antonio Chas, 65, Spanish footballer.
- Guy B. Gardner, 60, American football coach.
- Bert Leboe, 71, Canadian politician, MP (1953–1958, 1962–1968)
- Margaret Malcolm, 80, British novelist.
- Dim Montero, 62, American football coach, heart attack.
- Tom Morey, 74, Australian politician.
- Jack Ohrberg, 44, American police officer, shot.
- Sonia Orwell, 62, British editor and archivist, brain cancer.
- Eilif W. Paulson, 88, Norwegian economist.
- Sepp Rist, 80, German actor.
- Hawayo Takata, 79, American Reiki practitioner.
- Freda Thompson, 71, Australian aviator.
- Princess Victoria Louise of Prussia, 88, German royal.
- Renate Wagner-Rieger, 59, Austrian art historian.
- Edward A. Warman, 54, American politician, member of the Illinois House of Representatives (1965–1971).
- Dorothy West, 89, American actress.

=== 12 ===
- Bruno Bartolozzi, 69, Italian composer.
- Matt Benney, 78, New Zealand politician.
- Donald Henry Galloway, 82, American intelligence personnel.
- Allen Holden, 69, New Zealand cricketer.
- Erich Jantsch, 51, Austrian astrophysicist.
- Władysław Kochański, 62, Polish soldier.
- Jean Lesage, 68, Canadian politician, premier of Quebec (1960–1966), heart failure.
- Hilda Lindley, 61, American environmentalist, cancer.
- Urie McCleary, 75, American art director (Patton).
- Severino Montano, 65, Filipino playwright and poet.
- Sir Jules Thorn, 81, Austrian-British businessman and philanthropist.

=== 13 ===
- Fleming Alexander, 92, American newspaper publisher.
- Antoni Bura, 81, Polish Olympic bobsledder (1928).
- John Callender, 77, English footballer.
- John L. Dale, 52, American politician.
- Sir Ferdinand Cavendish-Bentinck, 8th Duke of Portland, 91, British hereditary peer.
- Kiyoshi Hasegawa, 89, Japanese-French artist.
- Ginevra King, 82, American socialite.
- R. D. Low, 85, Scottish comics writer (Oor Wullie).
- John Morris, 85, British anthropologist and mountaineer.
- Svend Olsen, 72, Danish Olympic weightlifter (1932).
- Cahit Ortaç, 71–72, Turkish politician.
- Harry Pursey, 89, British politician, MP (1945–1970).
- Hans Richter-Haaser, 68, German pianist.
- Norman Roberts, 84, British flying ace.
- Harm van Riel, 73, Dutch politician.

=== 14 ===
- Harry Bates, 68, British Anglican prelate.
- Sir Hugh Beadle, 75, Rhodesian jurist and politician.
- Bill Connor, 81, American football player.
- Sir Weldon Dalrymple-Champneys, 88, British physician.
- Richard Gurley Drew, 81, American inventor (masking tape).
- John Erskine, 1st Baron Erskine of Rerrick, 87, Scottish banker and politician.
- Elston Howard, 51, American baseball player and coach, myocarditis.
- Forbes Jones, 69, Scottish cricketer.
- Frank R. Kenison, 73, American lawyer and jurist, New Hampshire attorney general (1940–1942).
- Olive Whitlock Klump, 78, American nurse and public health official.
- Archie C. Kuntze, 60, American naval captain, heart attack.
- Emile Lahner, 87, Hungarian-French painter.
- Joël Le Theule, 50, French politician.
- Nichita Smochină, 86, Romanian political activist.
- Norman Taylor, 81, Canadian Olympic rower (1924).

=== 15 ===
- Lelia Constantza Băjenescu, 72, Romanian radio operator.
- Angus Campbell, 70, American psychologist, heart attack.
- Rudolph Cleveringa, 86, Dutch legal scholar.
- Denis Cussen, 79, Irish Olympic sprinter (1928).
- Hans Fiederer, 60, German footballer.
- Léopold Gelot, 90, French racing cyclist.
- Alvin Gouldner, 60, American sociologist, heart attack.
- Peter Gregg, 40, American racing driver, suicide by gunshot.
- Slavko Hlastan, 82, Slovenian Olympic gymnast (1924).
- Eugène Huat, 73, French boxer.
- Julius H. Johnston, 75, American football and basketball player and coach.
- Komninos Pyromaglou, 80–81, Greek politician.
- Ante Roje, 75, Croatian Olympic swimmer (1924, 1936).
- James L. Tuck, 70, British-American physicist.

=== 16 ===
- Frederick Arnold, 81, English cricketer.
- Keith Christie, 49, English jazz musician.
- Peter Collinson, 44, British film director (The Italian Job, Tomorrow Never Comes), lung cancer.
- Roddy Connolly, 79, Irish politician, TD (1943–1944, 1948–1951).
- Jan Fethke, 77, German-Polish filmmaker.
- Welthy Honsinger Fisher, 101, American literacy activist.
- Edward C. Harwood, 80, American economist.
- Anatol Josepho, 86, Russian-American inventor of the photo booth.
- Roy Lechthaler, 72, American football player.
- Jose B. Lingad, 66, Filipino politician, shot.
- J. D. Morgan, 61, American tennis player and coach.
- Colonel Sanders, 90, American fast food entrepreneur (Kentucky Fried Chicken), pneumonia.
- Ram Subhag Singh, 63, Indian politician.
- Stanisław Tatar, 84, Polish general.
- Hellmuth Walter, 80, German-American engineer.
- Helga Josephine Zinnbauer, 71, Austrian-Australian librarian.

=== 17 ===
- Şarık Arıyak, 50, Turkish diplomat, shot.
- Hank Baylis, 57, American baseball player.
- Ahmet Berman, 48, Turkish footballer.
- Robert Cauchon, 80, Canadian politician, MP (1949–1958).
- Chiang Kuei, 72, Taiwanese novelist.
- Sir William Duthie, 88, British politician, MP (1945–1964).
- Elsie Few, 71, Jamaican-born British artist.
- Marius Katiliškis, 66, Lithuanian writer.
- William Kendis, 64, American actor.
- Oskar Kummetz, 89, German naval admiral.
- Rubens Pedrazzi, 73, Italian sculptor.
- Ralph Spearow, 85, American Olympic pole vaulter (1924).
- Judson L. Transue, 83, American politician.
- Richard Tufts, 84, American golfer.

=== 18 ===
- Partomo Moegihardjo Alibazah, 50, Indonesian diplomat, cardiovascular disease.
- Mukat Behari Lal Bhargava, 77, Indian politician.
- Christopher Burney, 63, English diplomatic aide and soldier.
- Héctor José Cámpora, 71, Argentine politician, president (1973), laryngeal cancer.
- Dobriša Cesarić, 78, Croatian poet and translator.
- William M. Currie, 70, Canadian banking executive.
- Quartus de Wet, 81, South African jurist.
- Henry Frnka, 77, American football player and coach.
- Frances Fuller, 73, American actress.
- Raymond Gushue, 80, Canadian academic administrator and lawyer.
- Bertha I. Hill, 86, American politician.
- Alexei Kosygin, 76, Soviet politician, premier (1964–1980).
- Sir Albert Margai, 70, Sierra Leonean politician, prime minister (1964–1967), heart attack.
- Bucky Moore, 75, American football player.
- Gokul Chand Mukerji, 85–86, Indian-Iraqi soldier and driver.
- Gabrielle Robinne, 94, French actress.
- Ben Travers, 94, English playwright.

=== 19 ===
- Charles Cooper, 73, American basketball player and coach.
- Harry Daer, 62, English cricketer.
- Nasrollah Entezam, 80, Iranian diplomat, stroke.
- Theodora Hall, 78, New Zealand physician.
- Dora Jung, 74, Finnish textile artist.
- Moshe Kelman, 57, Israeli soldier and war criminal (Ein al-Zeitun massacre), cancer.
- Norm McLean, 84, Australian footballer.
- Geoffrey Sambell, 66, Australian Anglican prelate.
- Max M. Turshen, 74, American politician, member of the New York State Assembly (1937–1968).
- Olav Tveten, 73, Norwegian architect.
- Maurice Voirin, 89, French politician.
- Gustav Winckler, 83, German jurist.

=== 20 ===
- Cyril Abotomey, 78, Australian rugby player.
- Roland Bond, 77, British locomotive engineer.
- Sid Hird, 70, Australian-South African cricketer.
- Leo Jansen, 50, Dutch artist, heart attack.
- Robert E. Kintner, 71, American television executive and journalist, heart ailment.
- Mike Knode, 85, American football and baseball player.
- Dagmar Olsson, 72, Swedish actress.
- Artur Paredes, 81, Portuguese guitarist.
- Alfonso Salazar, 82, Chilean politician.
- Dagmar Salén, 79, Swedish Olympic sailor (1936).
- Ben Sharpsteen, 85, American film director and producer.
- Minoru Shibuya, 73, Japanese filmmaker.
- Jack Stapp, 68, American country music manager.
- Leandro Tojong, 75, Filipino politician.
- Tom Waring, 74, English footballer.
- Bertalan Zsótér, 74, Hungarian Olympic sports shooter (1936).

=== 21 ===
- Philip Lemont Barbour, 82, American historian and linguist, heart attack.
- Maurice Browne, 67, New Zealand cricketer.
- Marc Connelly, 90, American playwright (The Green Pastures).
- Carleton Harris, 70, American jurist.
- Tony Jacobs, 55, American baseball player.
- Stanisław Jaśkiewicz, 73, Polish actor.
- Gus Kuester, 92, American politician, member of the Iowa House of Representatives (1935–1957).
- Douglas Lockwood, 62, Australian journalist, heart attack.
- Bob Packard, 64, American Olympic sprinter (1936).
- Vladimir Potapov, 66, Soviet mathematician.
- Nelson Rodrigues, 68, Brazilian playwright, cardiovascular disease.

=== 22 ===
- Miriam Battista, 68, American actress, emphysema.
- William Fenn, 76, American Olympic cyclist (1924).
- Lewis Ganson, 66–67, English magician.
- Earl Grace, 73, American baseball player and coach.
- Joe Graves, 74, American baseball player.
- Magnus Hallenborg, 86, Swedish diplomat.
- Phillip Hoffman, 79, Canadian politician.
- William Hung, 87, Chinese-American historian.
- Thomas Cecil Hunt, 79, British gastroenterologist.
- Carlos Ramírez Ulloa, 77, Mexican civil engineer.
- Lesser Samuels, 86, American screenwriter.
- Karl Schlademan, 90, American college sports coach.
- Ethel Wilson, 92, Canadian author.

=== 23 ===
- James C. Archer, 80, Australian politician.
- Robert Ayre, 80, Canadian art critic.
- Stanley Bindoff, 72, English historian.
- Teodora Blanco Núñez, 52, Mexican artist.
- Rhoda Bloodworth, 91, New Zealand activist.
- Memmo Carotenuto, 72, Italian actor.
- Billy Dudley, 49, Nigerian political scientist.
- Paul Flinn, 85, American football player.
- Kris Neville, 55, American science fiction author.
- Frank Norman, 50, British novelist and playwright, Hodgkin's lymphoma.
- Ambrose Reeves, 81, British-South African Anglican prelate.
- Agnes Sander-Plump, 92, German painter.
- Cecilia Smith, 69, Australian Aboriginal activist, kidney failure.
- Astri Taube, 82, Swedish sculptor.
- Ulrich Wernitz, 59, German flying ace.
- Hans Wilhelm, 76, German screenwriter.

=== 24 ===
- Caroline van Hook Bean, 101, American painter.
- Louis F. Capuzi, 60, American politician, heart attack.
- Karl Dönitz, 89, German politician and naval admiral, president (1945), heart attack.
- Bob Habenicht, 54, American baseball player.
- Lew Lane, 81, American football and basketball coach.
- Heikki Liimatainen, 84, Finnish Olympic runner (1920, 1924).
- Johnny McQuade, 85, American football player.
- Irving Miller, 77, Russian-born American rabbi and Zionist activist.
- Ram Prasad Nautiyal, 75, Indian politician.
- Siggie Nordstrom, 87, American singer (Nordstrom Sisters) and socialite.
- Arland Ussher, 81, British translator and academic.
- George Valentine, 81, Australian footballer.
- Joaquín Valle, 64, Spanish footballer.
- Alec Wilder, 73, American composer, lung cancer.
- John Henry Williams, 93, American economist and academic administrator.

=== 25 ===
- Enrique Bahamonde, 88, Chilean politician.
- Ludwig Beck, 71, Liechtensteiner politician.
- Arthur Francis Buddington, 90, American geologist.
- Olav Dalgard, 82, Norwegian literary scholar.
- Henri Dufaux, 101, French-Swiss painter.
- Fred Emney, 80, English actor and comedian.
- Gu Jiegang, 87, Chinese historian.
- José Gutiérrez Alliende, 91, Chilean politician.
- Ernest Harding, 81, English rugby player.
- C. H. E. Haspels, 86, Dutch archaeologist.
- Robert H. Herman, 55, American gastroenterologist, heart attack.
- Erik Harry Johannessen, 78, Norwegian painter.
- Marcel Langiller, 72, French footballer.
- Iachen Ulrich Könz, 81, Swiss architect.
- Arthur Marder, 70, American historian, cancer.
- Louis Neefs, 43, Belgian singer, traffic collision.
- Quintin Riley, 75, British Arctic explorer, traffic collision.
- Karel Štěpánek, 81, Czech actor.
- Viola Van Katwijk, 86, American composer and pianist.
- Collier Young, 72, American film and television producer (Ironside), injuries sustained in a traffic collision.

=== 26 ===
- Edward Ajado, 51, Nigerian Olympic sprinter (1952).
- Giuseppe Balbo, 78, Italian painter.
- Richard Chase, 30, American serial killer, drug overdose.
- Ned Chawke, 62, Irish hurler.
- Bill Crouch, 73, American baseball player.
- Tony Firth, 73, New Zealand manufacturing executive (Firth Concrete).
- Ray Jenkins, 83, American lawyer, pneumonia.
- Peck Kelley, 82, American jazz pianist.
- Willie James Lyons, 42, American blues musician.
- Elizabeth Monk, 82, Canadian lawyer.
- Johnny Oulliber, 69, American baseball player.
- Stjepan Planić, 79, Croatian architect.
- Lake Russell, 82, American football and basketball coach.
- Tony Smith, 68, American sculptor, heart attack.
- Egidio Vagnozzi, 74, Italian Roman Catholic cardinal.

=== 27 ===
- Robert Asp, 57, American educator.
- Todhunter Ballard, 77, American novelist.
- Charles S. Dewey, 100, American politician, member of the U.S. House of Representatives (1941–1945).
- Eric Green, 72, English golfer.
- Arthur Havers, 82, English golfer.
- Michael Hughes-Young, 1st Baron St Helens, 68, British politician, MP (1955–1964).
- Leo Mishkin, 73, American film and television critic.
- Peet Petersen, 39, Dutch footballer, cancer.

=== 28 ===
- Pepper Bassett, 70, American baseball player.
- James N. Bloodworth, 59, American jurist.
- Carl B. Close, 73, American politician, member of the Louisiana House of Representatives (1944–1947).
- Amir Elahi, 72, Indian-Pakistani cricketer.
- Sue Metzger Dickey Hough, 97, American politician and lawyer.
- Mitsu Kōro, 87, Japanese politician.
- Walter "Popee" Lastie, 42, American jazz drummer, heart attack.
- Sam Levene, 75, Russian-born American actor (Guys and Dolls), heart attack.
- William McLennan, 77, Canadian politician, MP (1958–1962).
- Božo Milanović, 90, Croatian theologian and historian.
- Neville Price, 51, South African Olympic long jumper (1952, 1956).
- Tokutaro Sakurai, 83, Japanese general.
- Tariq bin Taimur, 59, Omani royal and politician, prime minister (1970–1972).
- Charles Tannen, 65, American actor and screenwriter, heart attack.
- Nobuzo Tohmatsu, 84, Japanese naval admiral.
- Franz Van Houtte, 90, Belgian footballer.
- Stan Yates, 80, Australian footballer.

=== 29 ===
- George Cooper, 73, Australian cricket umpire.
- Roy Engel, 67, American actor (Sky King).
- Lennie Felix, 60, British jazz pianist, injuries sustained in a traffic collision.
- Arnold J. Funk, 85, American general.
- James Gilluly, 84, American geologist.
- Tim Hardin, 39, American singer and songwriter ("If I Were a Carpenter"), heroin overdose.
- Luigi Lucotti, 87, Italian racing cyclist.
- Nadezhda Mandelstam, 81, Soviet writer and memoirist.
- Fatialofa Momoʻe, 57, Western Samoan politician.
- Gigi Peronace, 55, Italian football agent, heart attack.
- Enric Rabassa, 60, Spanish football player and coach.
- Art Reinholz, 77, American baseball player.
- John R. Rice, 85, American evangelist, stroke.
- Yoshio Shigezono, 72, Japanese lyricist.
- Alexandra Snezhko-Blotskaya, 71, Soviet film director.
- Harold H. Tittmann Jr., 87, American diplomat.
- Nanubhai Vakil, 78, Indian film director.
- Sir John Wall, Baron Wall, 67, British businessman,

=== 30 ===
- Frank Baker, 88, Australian-American actor.
- George Beel, 80, English footballer.
- B. R. Bruss, 84, French science fiction writer.
- Pop Buell, 67, American humanitarian.
- Giuseppe Carraro, 81, Italian Roman Catholic prelate.
- François Colomines, 85, French racing cyclist.
- Dorothy Dessau, 80, American academic and social worker, stroke.
- Harry Fultz, 92, American educator.
- Bruce Hale, 62, American basketball player and coach.
- Patrick Hennessy, 65, Irish painter.
- Dorothy P. Lathrop, 89, American children's author.
- J. D. McCarty, 64, American politician, member of the Oklahoma House of Representatives (1940–1966), heart attack.
- Francis Spurway, 86, English cricketer.
- Stuffy Stewart, 86, American baseball player.
- Robert Yendes, 82, American baseball player.

=== 31 ===
- Alan Bellhouse, 66, Australian musician and mathematician.
- Dalbir Bindra, 58, Indian-Canadian neuropsychologist.
- Satya Narayan Bohidar, 67, Indian writer.
- Árpád Borsányi, 48, Hungarian Olympic weightlifter (1960).
- Abdelhafid Boussouf, 54, Algerian politician.
- Jim Britt, 70, American sportscaster.
- George Cook, 85, English footballer.
- Maurice Cornforth, 71, British philosopher.
- Youra Guller, 85, French pianist.
- Ronald Allen Harris, 33, American Olympic boxer (1964).
- Ragnar Krogius, 77, Finnish chess player.
- Fernand Lemay, 86, French racing cyclist.
- Marshall McLuhan, 69, Canadian philosopher and writer.
- Gon'ichirō Nishizawa, 74, Japanese politician.
- Irmgard Österwall, 66, Swedish singer.
- Viljo Rantala, 88, Finnish politician.
- Mike Rodak, 63, American football player.
- Bob Shawkey, 90, American baseball player.
- Raoul Walsh, 93, American film director (The Big Trail, White Heat) and actor (The Birth of a Nation), heart attack.
- Arthur Wellard, 78, English cricketer.
- Irvin F. Westheimer, 101, American businessman and social reformer.
- Robert Pete Williams, 66, American blues musician, cancer.
- Nick Yost, 65, American basketball player.

== Sources ==
- Harry, Bill (2000). The John Lennon Encyclopedia. Virgin. ISBN 978-0-7535-0404-8.
- Ingham, Chris (2006). The Rough Guide to The Beatles. Rough Guides. ISBN 978-1-84353-720-5.
- Miles, Barry (1997). Paul McCartney: Many Years From Now. Henry Holt & Company. ISBN 978-0-8050-5248-0.
- Schatz, Thomas (1981). Hollywood Genres: Formulas, Filmmaking, and the Studio System. New York: Random House. ISBN 978-0-07-553623-9
- Silver, Alain, and Elizabeth Ward (1992). Film Noir: An Encyclopedic Reference to the American Style, 3d ed. Woodstock, N.Y.: Overlook Press. ISBN 978-0-87951-479-2 (See also: Silver, Ursini, Ward, and Porfirio [2010]. Film Noir: The Encyclopedia, 4th rev., exp. ed. Overlook. ISBN 978-1-59020-144-2)
