= Melngailis =

Origin
- Origin: Latvian

Melngailis (feminine: Melngaile) is a Latvian surname. Individuals with the surname include:

- Emilis Melngailis (1874–1954), Latvian composer.
- Sarma Melngailis (born 1972), Latvian-American former businesswoman.
- Tenis Melngailis (1912–1980), Latvian chess player.
