= William Holden (cricketer) =

New Zealand cricketer

Personal information
- Full name: William James Holden
- Born: 20 July 1883; Dunedin, Otago, New Zealand
- Died: 2 August 1949 (aged 66); Invercargill, Southland, New Zealand

Domestic team information
- Years: Team
- 1917/18–1918/19: Otago
- Source: ESPNcricinfo, 14 May 2016

William James Holden (20 July 1883 – 2 August 1949) was a New Zealand cricketer. He played four first-class matches for Otago during the 1917–18 and 1918–19 seasons.

Holden was born at Dunedin in 1883 and worked as a salesman. He played club cricket in both Dunedin and Christchurch. One of his sons, Allen Holden, also played first-class cricket for Otago, and another, Arthur Holden, was a rugby union half-back who played for Southland and New Zealand. Holden died at Invercargill in 1949. He was aged 66.
