= Tempio Monumentale San Giuseppe, Modena =

Coordinates: 44°39′5.778″N 10°56′0.553″E

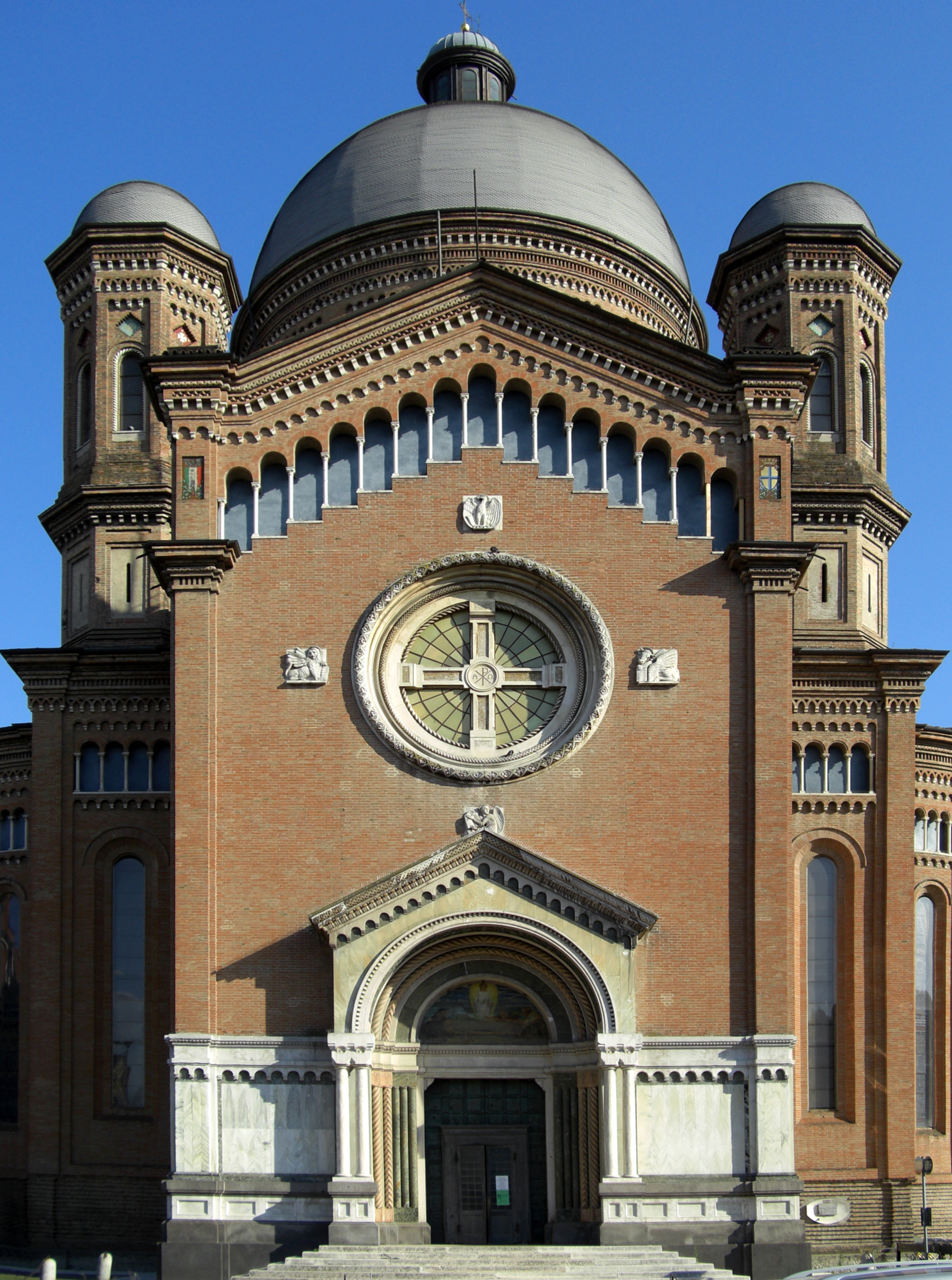
Facade, Monumental Temple of St Joseph

The Tempio Monumentale San Giuseppe (in English: Monumental Temple of St Joseph) or simplified as Tempio San Giuseppe was constructed in Modena, Italy, as a memorial for the 7237 fallen Modenese soldiers in the First World War. It is a Roman Catholic parish. It is located on Piazzale Natale Bruni, just off the Northwest corner of the Este Ducal Gardens, now the University of Modena Botanical Gardens.

The names of the fallen are inscribed in gilded letters on the walls of the crypt. The cornerstone was laid on December 8, 1923, in a ceremony with king Vittorio Emanuele III and Monsignor Natale Bruni, bishop of Modena, presiding. The church was inaugurated on 3 November 1929. The church was designed by Domenico Barbanti and Achille Casanova. The façade decoration however was not completed till 1931 with engraved bas-reliefs by Adamo and Rubens Pedrazzi. The façade lunette over the portal was frescoed by Evaristo Cappelli, and depicts the Resurrection of Christ and the Nation takes the dead soldiers in its arms.

The layout of the church is a Greek cross, rising in the dome with a diameter of 15.8 meters with four octagonal towers at the corners. The stained glass rose window was designed by Guglielmo Da Re of Milan, and others depicting the four evangelists by Benedetto Boccolari.

The crypt is accessible by a central staircase. The archbishop Natale Bruni is buried in the first chapel on the left, a medallion with his visage was completed by Giuseppe Graziosi. The altar on the right is dedicated to the Madonna of Lourdes and was carved by the sculptor Vigni of Florence. The main altar has a ciborium in part work of the brothers Pedrazzi. To the left of the entrance is the baptistery, the bronze statue of St John the Baptist was sculpted by Graziosi. To the left is a chapel dedicated to those fallen during the Conquest of Ethiopia (1935–37). The Pietà in terracotta was sculpted by Manfredini.
