= Lester Kluever =

American politician (1920–1991)

Member of the Iowa House of Representatives from the 30th district
- In office January 14, 1957 – January 10, 1971
- Preceded by: Gus Kuester
- Succeeded by: Darwin Mayberry

Personal details
- Born: February 29, 1920 Atlantic, Iowa
- Died: February 18, 1991 (aged 70) Atlantic, Iowa
- Party: Republican

Lester Kluever (February 29, 1920 – February 18, 1991) was an American politician who served in the Iowa House of Representatives from the 30th district from 1957 to 1971.

He died of a heart attack on February 18, 1991, in Atlantic, Iowa at age 70.
