= Noyers-Pont-Maugis =

- Commune
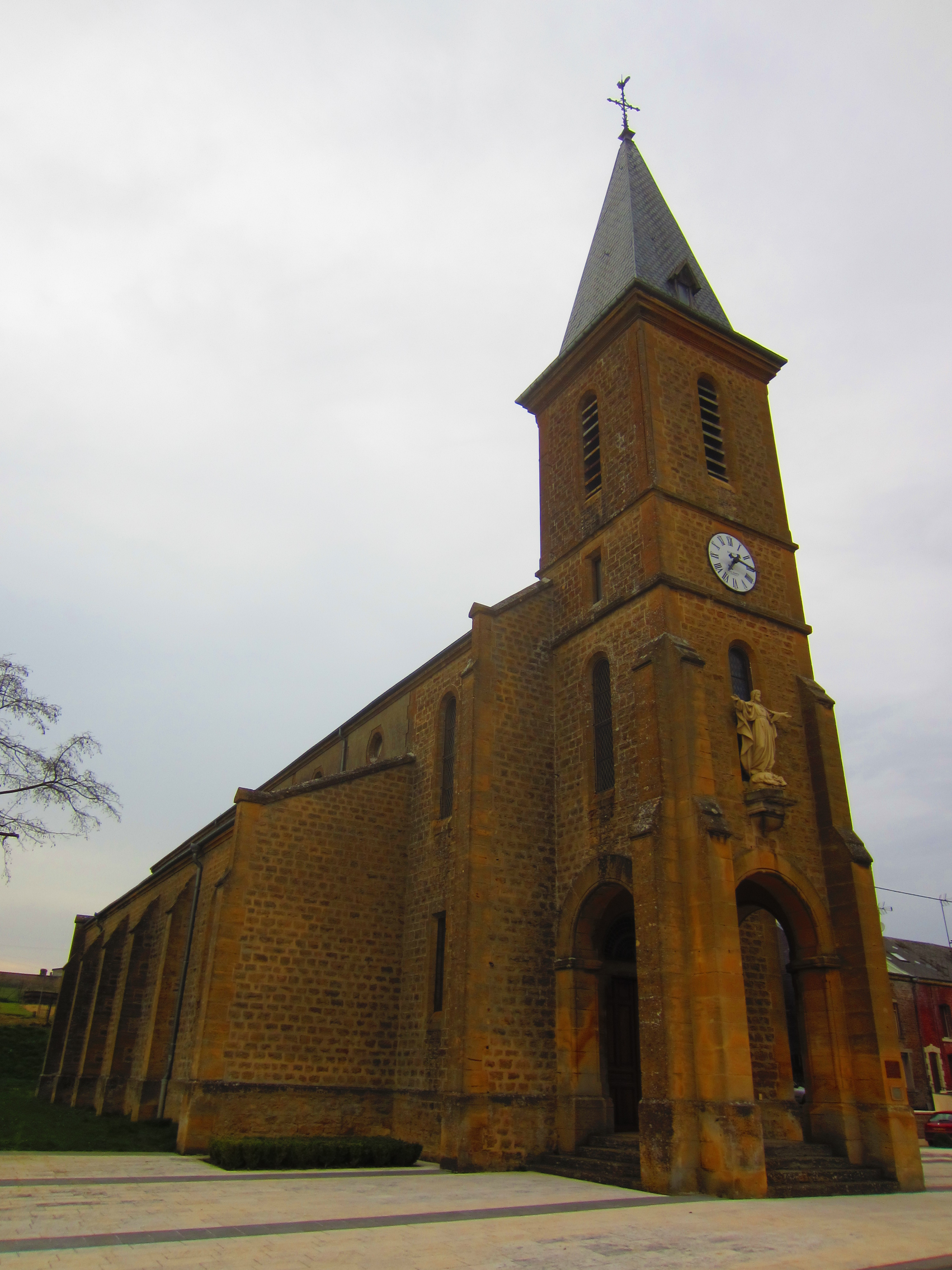
- The church of Saint-Remi in Pont-Maugis
- Location of Noyers-Pont-Maugis
- Location within France Location within Grand Est
- Coordinates: 49°39′45″N 4°56′17″E
- Country: France
- Region: Grand Est
- Department: Ardennes
- Arrondissement: Sedan
- Canton: Sedan-1
- Intercommunality: CA Ardenne Métropole

Government
  - Mayor (2024–2026): Aurélien Joly
- Area^{1}: 9.32 km^{2} (3.60 sq mi)
- Elevation: 275 m (902 ft)
- Highest elevation: 341 m (1,119 ft)
- Lowest elevation: 153 m (502 ft)
- Population (2023): 673
  - Density: 72.2/km^{2} (187/sq mi)
- Time zone: UTC+01:00 (CET)
  - Summer (DST): UTC+02:00 (CEST)
- INSEE/Postal code: 08331 /08350
- ^{1} French Land Register data, which excludes lakes, ponds, glaciers > 1 km^{2} (0.386 sq mi or 247 acres) and river estuaries.

Noyers-Pont-Maugis is a commune in the Ardennes department in northern France.

== Population ==
Historical population
Year	Pop.	±% p.a.
1968	902	—
1975	904	+0.03%
1982	795	−1.82%
1990	738	−0.93%
1999	712	−0.40%
2007	718	+0.10%
2012	724	+0.17%
2017	684	−1.13%
2023	673	−0.27%
Source: INSEE

== Notable residents ==
- Maurice Voirin

== See also ==
- Communes of the Ardennes department
