= Allen Holden =

New Zealand cricketer

Personal information
- Full name: Allen Clyde Holden
- Born: 18 April 1911; Christchurch, New Zealand
- Died: 12 December 1980 (aged 69); Dunedin, New Zealand
- Batting: Right-handed
- Role: Batsman
- Relatives: William Holden (father); Arthur Holden (brother)

Domestic team information
- Years: Team
- 1937/38–1939/40: Otago
- Source: ESPNcricinfo, 14 May 2016

Allen Clyde Holden (18 April 1911 – 12 December 1980) was a New Zealand cricketer. He played two first-class matches for Otago, one in each of the 1937–38 and 1939–40 seasons.

Holden was born at Christchurch, where his father William Holden was working for a time, in 1911 and educated at Otago Boys' High School in Dunedin where he played cricket for the school XI. He attained the University of Otago and qualified as a barrister, coached at Kaikorai Cricket Club and in 1948 was appointed to the staff of John McGlashan College where he taught.

As a club cricketer, Holden, who initially played for the Otago Old Boys' team before moving to Kaikorai, was considered a useful cricketer. He had scored a century whilst at school, made "in a most attractive style", and made "an auspicious start" in his first season in the Old Boys' First XI in the 1930–31 season. By 1934 he was being described by the cricket correspondent of The Evening Star as "a nice stamp of batsman" who had a "sound defence" as well as "a good eye and a nice range of strokes". The paper was of the opinion that "it should not be long before he is in among the runs" and later in the season praised his driving ability and his use of his feet.

The following season The Evening Star again praised Holden's defence as well as his "array of strokes" and considered that he had a "very sound grounding in the name" and tipped him for representative cricket if he continued to develop, and he played for Otago in the annual match against Southland in February 1935. (Note: The fixture against Southland was not considered first-class at this time.) By December 1937 his "sound and confident display" in scoring a half-century again drew praise. Later in the same month the paper praised his "clean and hard" off drives, and just before Christmas his "fine form" and "polished" batting. Later in the season he made his full representative debut, playing in a February 1938 Plunket Shield fixture against Wellington at Carisbrook in Dunedin, Otago's final representative match of the season.

After starting "shakily" he "played some good cover strokes" in his first innings, but was out for 22 runs and recorded a duck in Otago's second innings. He was selected for the Otago squad for the following season's Shield matches but did not play, although he opened the batting for the team in a one-day match against Southland in October. He was elected to the Otago Cricket Association committee in September 1939, and played his final representative match for the team in December the same year, scoring 19 and 36 against Auckland at Eden Park after having not been selected for the match against Canterbury earlier in the month. He dropped out of the team for Otago's final match of the season, acting as twelfth man for the match against Wellington with Cecil Toomey taking his place, the Otago Daily Times suggesting that this was "the right occasion to give a promising player his opportunity". (Note: Toomey made his first-class debut in the match.)

At the start of the following season a leg injury was preventing Holden from playing cricket, and by October 1941 he was serving in the armed forces during World War II, although he did play some wartime cricket for Army teams. He was commissioned as a second lieutenant and served abroad in the New Zealand Medical Corps.

Holden's brother, Arthur Holden, was a rugby union half-back who played for Southland and New Zealand. Holden died at Dunedin in 1980 at the age of 69.
