= Francis Toomey =

New Zealand cricketer

Personal information
- Full name: Francis Joachim Toomey
- Born: 8 February 1904; Dunedin, Otago, New Zealand
- Died: 14 March 1992 (aged 88); Dunedin, Otago, New Zealand
- Batting: Right-handed
- Role: Wicket-keeper
- Relatives: Cecil Toomey (brother)

Domestic team information
- Years: Team
- 1934/35–1935/36: Otago
- Source: CricInfo, 26 May 2016

Francis Joachim Toomey (8 February 1904 – 14 March 1992) was a New Zealand cricketer. He played three first-class matches for Otago in the 1934–35 and 1935–36 seasons.

Toomey was born at Dunedin in 1904 and worked as a manager. He made his first-class debut for Otago in February 1935, keeping wicket for Otago against Canterbury in the side's final Plunket Shield match of the season. He made his other two appearances for Otago the flowing season, playing in a Shield match against Auckland over the Christmas period before a match against the touring English side at New Year. He cut his eye badly during the match when a ball hit him in the face whilst standing up to the stumps. He did not play again for the representative side; his replacement in the Otago side, George Mills went on to play 55 times for the province in a career which lasted until the 1957–58 season.

Toomey died at Dunedin in 1992 aged 88. At the time of his death he was Otago's oldest living cricketer. Obituaries were published in the New Zealand Cricket Almanack and in the following year's Wisden. His brother, Cecil Toomey, also played first-class cricket, making seven appearances for Otago in the 1940s.
