= Hoppie van Jaarsveld =

South African rugby union player

- Full name: Christoffel Jacobus van Jaarsveld
- Born: 21 February 1917 Bloemhof, South Africa
- Died: 8 December 1980 (aged 63)

Rugby union career
- Position: Prop
Provincial / State sides
Years	Team	Apps	(Points)
- Transvaal
International career
Years	Team	Apps	(Points)
1949	South Africa	1	(0)

Christoffel Jacobus van Jaarsveld (21 February 1917 – 8 December 1980), known as Hoppie van Jaarsveld, was a South African international rugby union player.

Raised in Bloemhof, van Jaarsveld didn't pick up rugby until the age of 17 and was originally a backline player until putting on sufficient weight to be transferred to the pack during his mid 20s. He spent much of his career with the Simmer and Jack club in Johannesburg, made up of local miners, and made his representative debut for Transvaal in 1944.

In 1949, van Jaarsveld was called up by the Springboks for a home series against the All Blacks. He only featured in the opening Test match at Newlands, packing the front row with Okey Geffin and Jorrie Jordaan. The Springboks won the match 15–11. This remained his only Springboks cap and he retired in 1953.

== See also ==
- List of South Africa national rugby union players
