= Cecil Toomey =

New Zealand cricketer

Personal information
- Full name: Cecil Dimic Gerard Toomey
- Born: 4 October 1915; Dunedin, New Zealand
- Died: 11 August 1981 (aged 65); Dunedin, New Zealand
- Batting: Right-handed
- Relatives: Francis Toomey (brother)

Domestic team information
- Years: Team
- 1939/40–1945/46: Otago
- Source: ESPNcricinfo, 26 May 2016

Cecil Dominic Gerard Toomey (4 October 1915 – 11 August 1981) was a New Zealand cricketer. He played eight first-class matches, seven of them for Otago between the 1939–40 and 1945–46 seasons.

Toomey was born at Dunedin in 1915 and worked as a dentist. He made his representative debut for Otago in the team's final match of the 1939–40 season, a fixture against Wellington at Carisbrook. He replaced the more experienced Allen Holden in the side following Otago's heavy defeat against Auckland in December, the Otago Daily Times suggesting that this was "the right occasion to give a promising player his opportunity". He scored 11 runs in his first innings and made a half-century―a score of 51―in the second as Otago recorded their first victory of the Plunket Shield season. He played in a variety of wartime matches, six of which have first-class status, including a match for South Island against North Island in March 1945, as well as representative matches between Otago and Southland. His final first-class fixture was in the 1945–46 Plunket Shield against Wellington at the Basin Reserve.

Toomey died at Dunedin in 1981. He was aged 65. An obituary was published in the New Zealand Cricket Almanack. His older brother Francis also played first-class cricket for Otago.
