= Teodora Blanco Núñez =

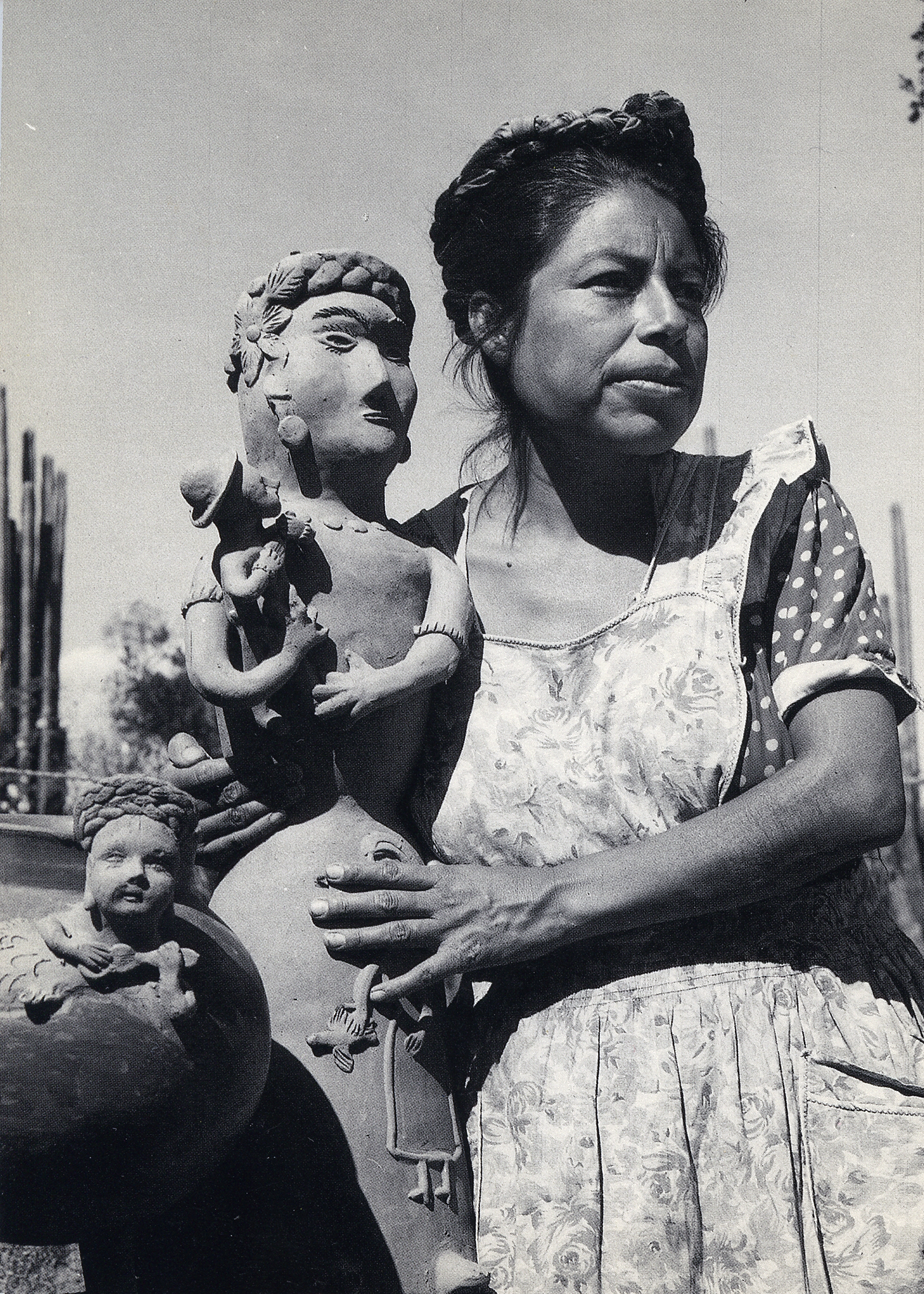
Matriarch Teodora Blanco Nuñez with piece

Teodora Blanco Núñez (February 28, 1928 – December 23, 1980) was an artisan in Santa María Atzompa, Oaxaca, Mexico who created her own style of decorative ceramics that influence the potters of her generation and those after in the region. The traditional ceramic of Atzompa has a green glaze, but that of Blanco Núñez is of natural beige and/or a reddish color from the clay. Instead, her work is distinguished by the creation of female and fantasy figures, profusely decorated with finely shaped bits of clay that are placed over the main body. It has since been imitated and reinterpreted by others in the region including various members of her own family, some of whom still work in the family compound that she lived and worked in.

== Life and family ==
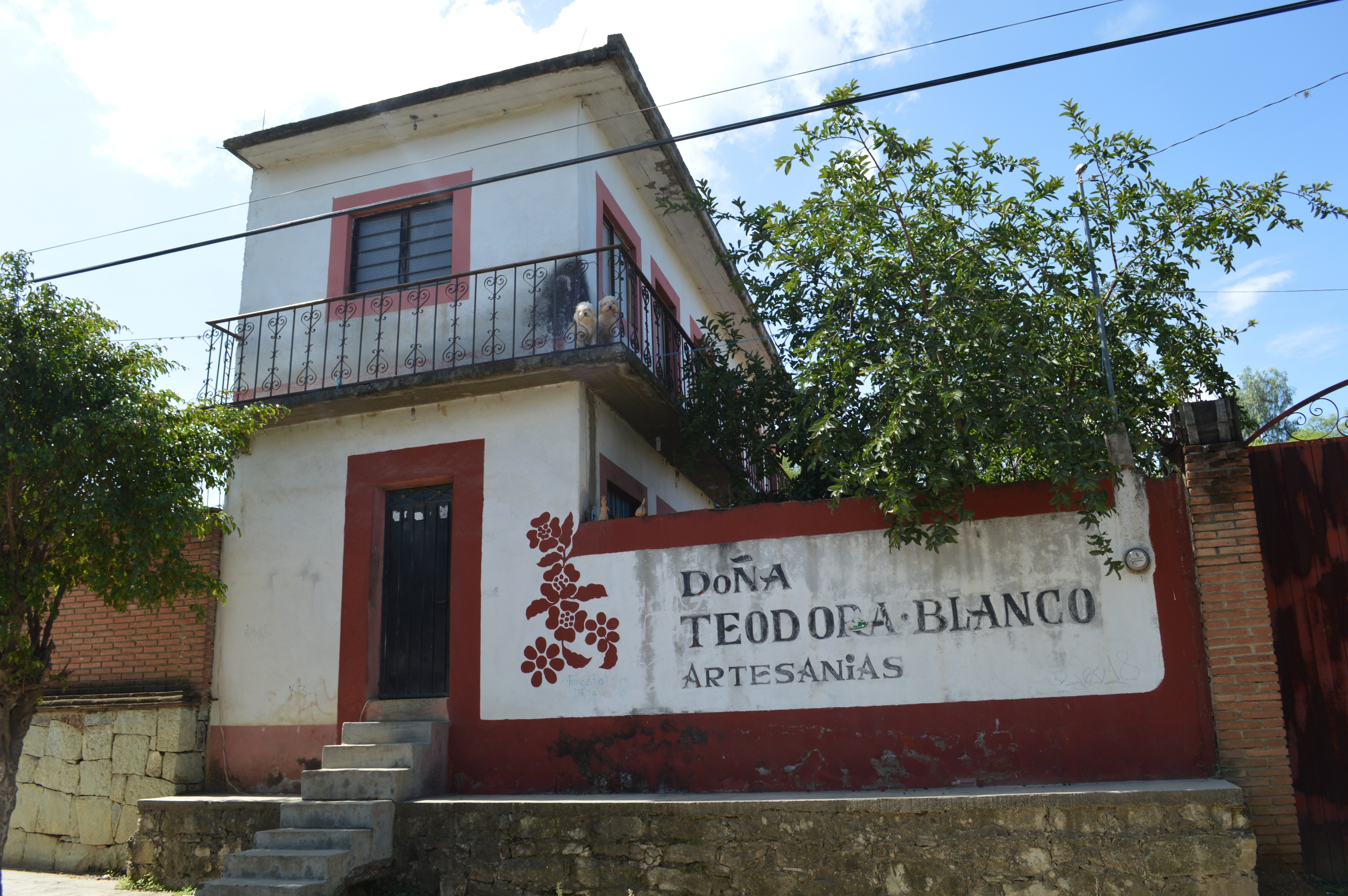
Outside of the Blanco family compound in Santa María Atzompa

Blanco Núñez was born in Santa María Atzompa, a town where pottery-making is dominated by women. The town is known for its green glazed pottery (loza verde) as well as the making of Chia Pet animals, the most traditional being deer. These are traditionally made and the chia seed grown in come for Holy Week to be placed on altars. Her indigenous heritage is Mixtec, and worked with clay all her life, following the footsteps of her parents, who mostly made ashtrays, figures of monkeys called machines and small figures of musicians. She began when she was about six and soon her decorative elements on ashtrays stood out.

As she developed her ceramic work and it became known, she became relatively famous and wealthy for rural Oaxaca standards, able to send her sons to the city of Oaxaca for their education. However, she remained on the same land that she bought with her husband, Antonio Garcia Reyes, before she became famous but used the money she earned to build on the property and buy farm animals. This compound is still the home to most of the family and consists of two lines of buildings facing a courtyard, separated from the street by a wall.

She has been described as having a “witty and forceful with charm and presence” as well as an active and creative mind and was the matriarch of the family while she was alive. She taught all her children (two daughters and three sons) to work with clay but especially the eldest daughter, Irma, with the expectation that she would carry on the tradition.

Blanco Núñez died on the Night of the Radishes (December 23) at age 52

Since her death, the family has carried on the tradition of making decorative figures with ornate decoration, but it is her son, Luis Garcia Blanco, who has carried on his mother’s business preserving much of his mother’s style but has added his own touches in faces. He works with his wife Maria Rojas de Garcia and the two daughters in the family compound.

Teodora’s tradition of creating female figures and a decorative style called pastillaje has become traditional for the Blanco family, carried on also by her brother, sister and a number of her grandchildren. Irma Garcia Blanco specializes in female figures and Alicia Leticia specializes in smaller figures, especially mermaids with well-crafted details. Bertha Blanco Núñez specializes in doll figures, especially images of virgins. Faustino Avelino Blanco Núñez works with his family to create a number of different ceramics, creating new works and entering competitions. He learned the basics from his parents but Teodora taught him her decorative techniques. However, not all her family became potters, Her son Arturo became a pharmacist and another son, Roberto, a teacher.

== Career ==
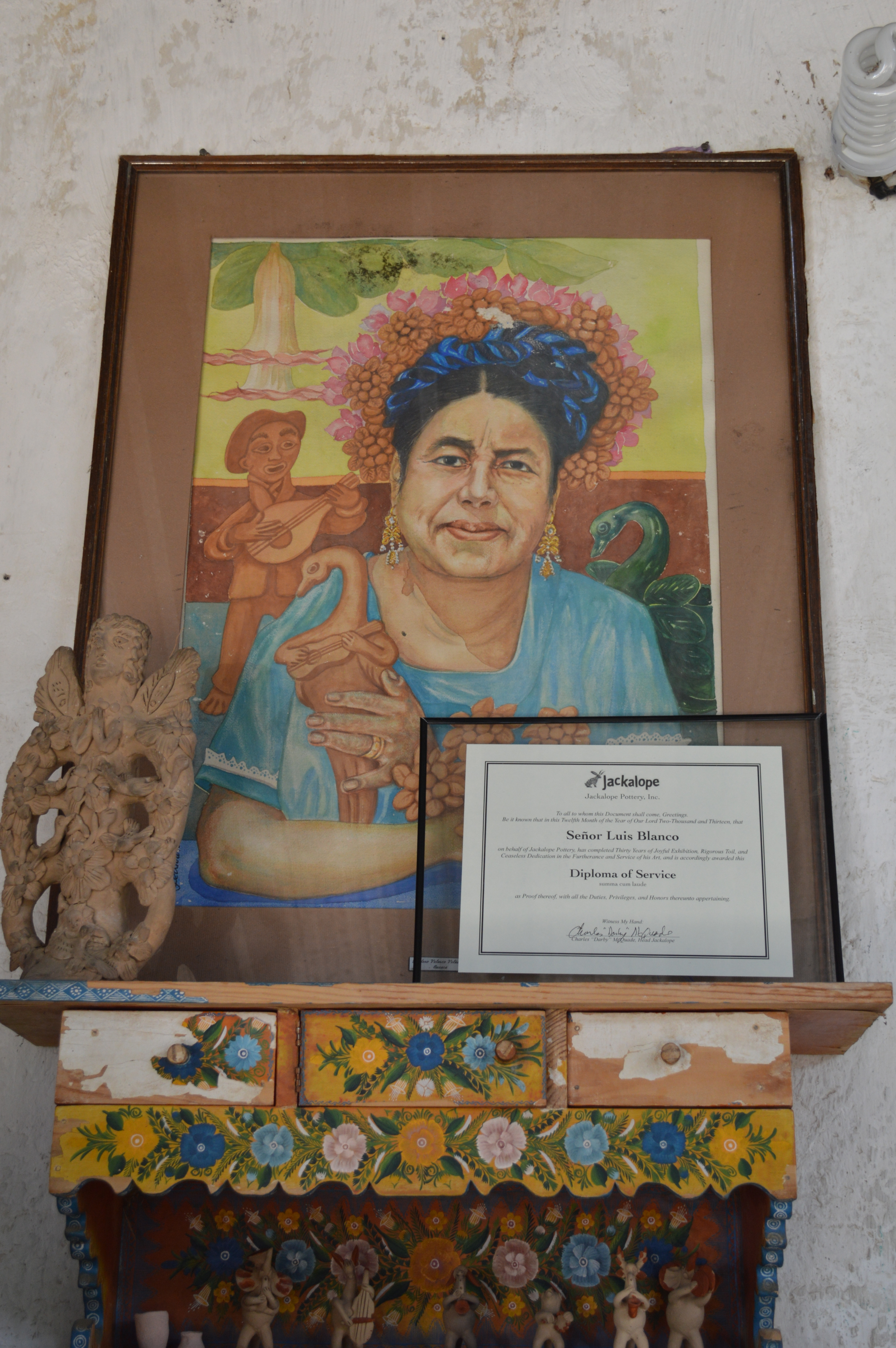
Shrine to the artisan at the Blanco family compound

Since she was young, Teodora sold her wares at the 20 de Noviembre market in the city of Oaxaca. In the 1970s, a foreigner in the market was attracted to her work and offered to buy all of her production. He then pushed her to increase the variety of her work and she experimented with clay models of churches, decorating them with flowers and angels, as well as figures of animals common to the area such as donkeys, iguanas, ducks, pigs, cows, goats and more. Her breakthrough product was that of heavily decorated female figures heavily decorated with small pieces of clay pressed on top of the figure. Over time the figures became more varied and more complicated. She eventually worked with various government agencies as well as the Rockefeller Foundation.

== Recognition ==
Teodora’s work made her notable by breaking away from the local pottery tradition but also enhancing it, influencing the ceramics of the region for both her generation and those after, as her work was imitated and reinterpreted by other artisans. Her work brought attention to the pottery traditions of Santa María Atzompa and assured it would remain important among the many pottery communities of the Valley of Oaxaca.

For this, she won many national and international prizes, other recognitions and has been the subject of many articles. She was invited to events such as World Crafts Council meetings in and out of Mexico

Her work was admired by Nelson Rockefeller who would buy everything she had when he visited her home. Eventually he collected over 175 pieces of her work.

== Artistry ==
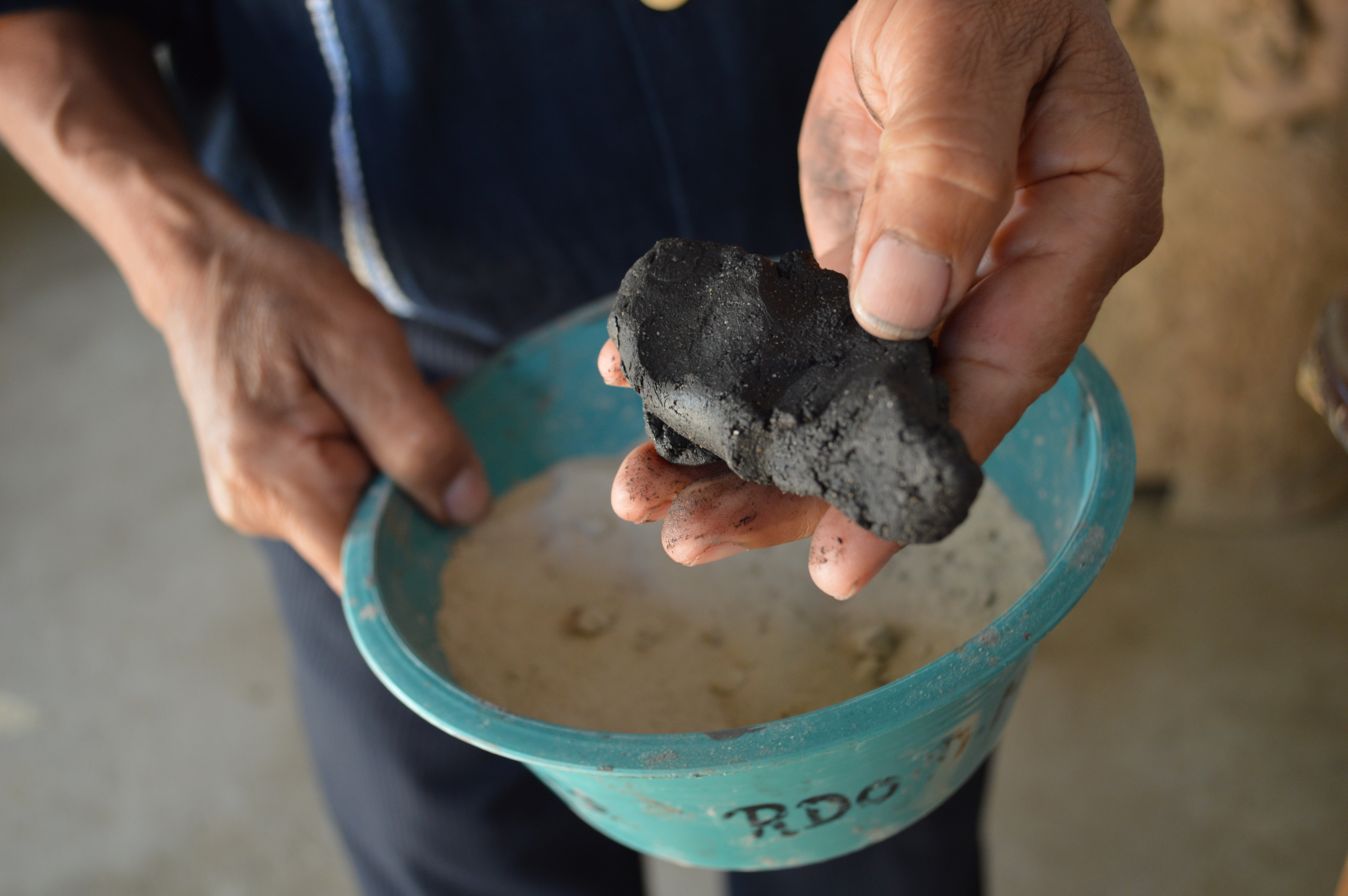
Son Luis showing the black unfired clay used by Teodora and her family

Blanco Núñez developed her style over time, in general making her pieces more ornate and leaving behind the traditional green glass of Atzompa ceramics. However, her use of fine detail and decoration on ceramics is not entirely new for the area. The use of fine lines and elements as decoration can be traced to ceramics of the fourth century CE in Atzompa and Ocotlán, both in decorated earplugs as well as necklaces made in the same way. The use of small dots made with balls of clay can also be found on pre Hispanic pottery in Oaxaca and Guanajuato. Much of this use evolved and changed over time with the blending of Mixtec and Zapotec cultures.

Her trademark was the use of finely shaped pieces of clay that were pressed onto the main sculpture to create details and decoration. This is most often called “pastillaje” after the frosting decoration on Mexico’s special occasion cakes but also called “bordado” (embroidery). The female figures reflect the life and traditions of rural Oaxaca, including the appearance of colonial Oaxaca style filigree earrings, rebozos, necklaces and clay pots, including the large “apaxtles” used to boil corn in lime water. She also made figures in scenes such as dances, weddings, baptisms, funerals and Christmas nativity scenes. These elements often include flowers, leaves, tendrils and vines and often evoke the jewelry worn by women in the area.

Her female figures were called “monas,” an affectionate term meaning “female monkey” as well as muñecas (dolls), juguetes (toys) or simply “figuras." The dimensions of her monas varied but the proportions stayed the same. The figures are of a stocky build, with the waist around the halfway point and the head accounting for about one-quarter of the height. Her largest female figures were life-sized. Both large and small pieces were made with fine detail and faces with the same tranquil expression with eyes having a slightly Asian look, reflecting those of Teodora Blanco herself.

She also created allegorical figures with elements of fantasy, influenced by the Atzompa tradition of creating small animal figures with human qualities, such as playing musical instruments. Her fantasy figures include humans with animal heads or horns and women nursing animals. This work reflects traditional beliefs, especially in nahuals which in her region have both a positive and negative relationship with humans. One such figure is a very large piece at the Casa de Cultura in Atzompa, a goddess of fertility figure, designated as such by eighteen breasts and the goddess’s many sons climb over her and an image of the moon is above the scene. Anthropomorphic figures and elements were almost always female, with exceptions such as archangels and king figures for nativity scenes.

Working in a windowless workshop, all of her pieces were created with rudimentary tools and materials: clay, water, a “turntable” consisting of a plate resting on an inverted bowl, a strip of newspaper or leather, a thorn (chaquixtle) and a flat piece of metal. The clay was brought from nearby Cacaotepec and was mixed with sand as a temper and strained through a fine mesh screen. As it is worked, it is black, but firing turns it beige with a red tinge.

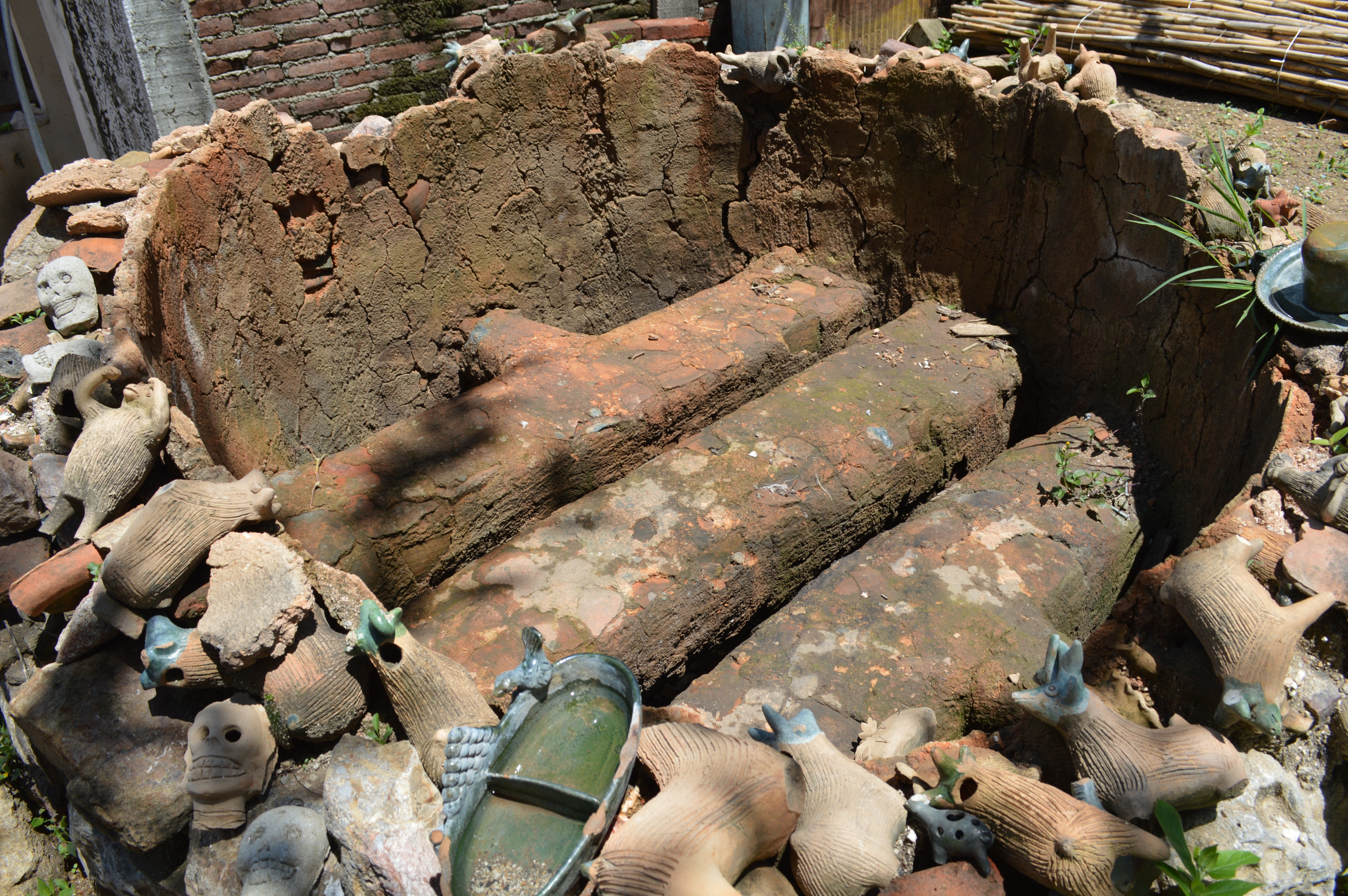
Remains of the kiln used by the artisan, including broken pieces made by her

She began her figures by making the body, which started out as a lump of clay formed into an elongated cup and further extended with coils of clay. The head was extended from the top of the body. Smoothing and detailing was done with her fingers constantly dipped in water and later by scraping with a piece of metal. After the main aspects of the piece were done, it generally sat for two days before she began to apply the pastillaje and extra elements. The reason for this is to let the body harden enough to support the weight of the new elements. The eyes were formed by very thinly rolled bits of clay, whose ends are placed together into an almond shape, giving them and Asian look. They were spaced far apart. These and other pastillaje elements were gently patted on by hand or if they were added using the thorn. The thorn was also use to inscribe even more delicate indentations into the work such as eyelashes. The large pieces with elaborate embellishments took her between two and three weeks to complete before firing. She signed her work with her initials and complained that others copied her work including her signature. She worked with two kilns, one larger than the other and heated them with ocote wood. The fire was lit in a separate space below, with pieces to be fired laid carefully in the upper chamber, using pieces of broken pottery to stabilize them. After firing the pieces are finished. Blanco rarely applied color to her pieces, and when she did, it was a red clay slip for contrast with the natural beige color.
