= Jorrie Jordaan =

South African rugby union player

- Full name: Rudolph Phillipus Jordaan
- Born: 13 July 1920 Cradock, South Africa
- Died: 22 September 1998 (aged 78)
- Height: 1.83 m (6 ft 0 in)
- Weight: 86.2 kg (190 lb)

Rugby union career
- Position: Hooker
Provincial / State sides
Years	Team	Apps	(Points)
- Northern Transvaal
International career
Years	Team	Apps	(Points)
1949	South Africa	4	(0)

Rudolph Phillipus Jordaan (13 July 1920 – 22 September 1998) was a South African international rugby union player.

Jordaan was born in Cradock and educated at Cradock High School.

A sturdy forward, Jordaan played his rugby for Pretoria Police and was mainly utilised as a hooker, but could also play the loose forward role. He made his representative debut for Northern Transvaal in 1941 and had considerable experience by the time he was called up by the Springboks. Playing as a hooker, Jordaan featured in all four home Test matches for the Springboks against the touring All Blacks in 1949, helping them to a series whitewash.

Jordaan was a member of the South African Police.

== See also ==
- List of South Africa national rugby union players
