= Norm McLean =

Australian rules footballer

Personal information
- Full name: Norman Angus McLean
- Born: 19 December 1896; Williamstown, Victoria
- Died: 19 December 1980 (aged 84); Parkdale, Victoria
- Height: 179 cm (5 ft 10 in)
- Weight: 74 kg (163 lb)

Playing career^{1}
Years	Club	Games (Goals)
1920	Essendon	6 (0)
- ^{1} Playing statistics correct to the end of 1920.

Norman Angus McLean (19 December 1896 – 19 December 1980) was an Australian rules footballer who played with Essendon in the Victorian Football League (VFL).
