= François Colomines =

French cyclist

Personal information
- Born: 22 June 1895
- Died: 30 December 1980 (aged 85)

Cycling career
- Sport: Cycling
- Role: Rider

François Colomines (22 June 1895 – 30 December 1980) was a French racing cyclist. He rode in the 1921 Tour de France.
