= John Thomas (Irish footballer) =

Irish footballer

Personal information
- Full name: John Thomas
- Date of birth: 23 August 1896
- Place of birth: Dublin, Ireland
- Date of death: 9 December 1980 (aged 84)
- Place of death: New Milford, New Jersey, U.S.
- Position: Midfielder

Senior career*
Years	Team	Apps	(Gls)
- Bohemians

International career
1924	Irish Free State	2	(0)
- * Club domestic league appearances and goals

John JamesThomas (23 August 1896 – 9 December 1980) was an Irish footballer who played as a midfielder and made two appearances for the Irish Free State national team.

== Career ==
Thomas was included in the Irish Free State squad for the 1924 Summer Olympic football tournament in Paris. Though he did not feature in the Olympics, he made two appearances for the team in friendly matches after Ireland's elimination from the tournament. The first match took place on 3 June 1924 against Estonia in Colombes, while the second took place in Dublin on 14 June against the United States. Both matches finished as 3–1 wins for Ireland.

== Career statistics ==
=== International ===
Irish Free State
Year	Apps	Goals
1924	2	0
Total	2	0
