= Emilis Melngailis =

Latvian composer

- Born: 15 February 1874; Igate, Governorate of Livonia, Russian Empire
- Died: 20 December 1954 (aged 80); Riga, Latvian SSR, Soviet Union
- Education: Jāzeps Vītols Latvian Academy of Music
- Awards: Order of the Three Stars; Order of the Red Banner of Labour

Emilis Jūlijs Melngailis (15 February 1874 – 20 December 1954) was a Latvian composer, folklorist, and a master of choral songs. He was an organizer and chief conductor of Latvian Song and Dance Festival several times. He wrote 53 original songs for a cappella choir, and finished numerous national folk songs.

Melngailis was also a good chess player and participated in the leadership of Latvian Chess federation. His son Tenis was one of the best Latvian chess players in his time.

== Biography ==
Melngailis was born to a teacher's family in Igate, Governorate of Livonia. He studied in Igate, Lēdurga, Rauna and Vecpiebalga church schools. During the period from 1887 to 1891, he studied at Riga City Gymnasium. During the last school year he lived with Rūdolfs Blaumanis. In 1896 he left to study in Dresden conservatory for one year. While in Dresden, he composed several compositions, including the "Latvian Requiem". In 1898, he went to Petersburg Conservatory of Music. In 1901, he finished learning in Conservatory and in the following year he released his first choral song collection in "Birzēs i norās" book. Later, he worked for some time in Petersburg newspaper "St. Petersburger Zeitung". In 1904, E. Melngailis went to Tashkent, where he lived until 1920. There he worked in cadet corps as a pedagogue. In 1920, he released the second "Birzēs i norās" book.

In 1920 he returned to Latvia, where he began to work as a choir conductor, and carried out a number of other works to make a living. Melngailis became the head of Latvian Conservatory in Folklore Department. He founded a new choir and went to tour all around Latvia. He was a chief conductor in two general song festivals – The Seventh Latvian Song Festival in 1931 and The Song Festival on Remembrance Day in 1933, which later was renamed as The Eighth Latvian Song Festival.

After World War II and the start of the second Soviet occupation of Latvia, E. Melngailis was awarded the Latvian SSR People's Artist Award and in 1949 he received the Order of the Red Banner of Labour. He died in Riga at the age of 80.

== Songs ==
Emīls Melngailis has collected around 220 Latvian folk songs in "Birzēs i norās" collections ("Tumša nakte, zaļa zāle", "Ozolīti, zemzarīti", "Bērīts manis kumeliņis", "Tek saulīte tecēdama", "Kas kurmīti dancināja"), as well as choral songs ("Jāņuvakars", "Senatne"). Overall, 10 "Birzēs i norās" books have come out, they were issued in the period from 1902 to 1956. "Latvian musical folklore materials" (around 5000 folk melodies). I ed. Korsa. II ed. Maliena. III ed. Vidiena. Latvian dance.
