= Chiang Kuei =

Chinese novelist

- Born: Wang Lin-du; October 10, 1908; Zhucheng, Shandong, Qing Empire
- Died: December 17, 1980 (aged 72); Taichung, Taiwan
- Language: Chinese

Chinese name
- Traditional Chinese: 姜貴
- Simplified Chinese: 姜贵
Transcriptions
Standard Mandarin
- Hanyu Pinyin: Jiāng Guì
- Wade–Giles: Chiang^{1} Kuei^{4}

Wang Lin-du
- Chinese: 王林渡
Transcriptions
Standard Mandarin
- Hanyu Pinyin: Wáng Líndù

Wang Lin-du (10 October 1908 – 17 December 1980), better known by his pen name Chiang Kuei, was a Chinese novelist active in Taiwan.

== Life and work ==
Chiang Kuei was born in mainland China. As a young man, he was influenced by the May Fourth Movement (1919) and joined the Kuomintang at age 18 in Guangzhou. He married at age 29, and attended college in Beijing. In 1937 he joined the Chinese army as an officer, and served for eight years in the war against Japan in the Northern campaign (Hebei, Henan, Anhui). His mother and adopted mother were both killed by the Communists in 1945. He moved to Taiwan with the Kuomintang in 1948.

Chiang Kuei wrote novels from the early 1950s to the late 1970s. His first and second novels are his best known works: The Whirlwind (written 1952, published 1959) and Rival Suns (1961). Both are anti-communist; the first portrays Chinese communism in a rural setting, and the second within a city (Wuhan).

His third major novel was The Green Sea and the Blue Sky: A Nocturne (1964). It received little comment. A number of novels followed. Chiang Kuei lived in great poverty, and these books were mainly written for the money.

== Works translated into English ==
Year (original)	Chinese title (traditional Chinese)	Translated English title	Translator
1952	旋風	The Whirlwind	Timothy A. Ross
1961	重陽	A Translation of the Chinese Novel Chung-yang (Rival Suns) by Chiang Kuei (1908-1980). Edwin Mellen Press. 1999. ISBN 0-7734-8188-5.	Timothy A. Ross
1977	護國寺的燕子	"The Swallows of Hu-kuo Temple"	Carlos G. Tee
