= Dorothy Dessau =

American social worker (1900-1980)

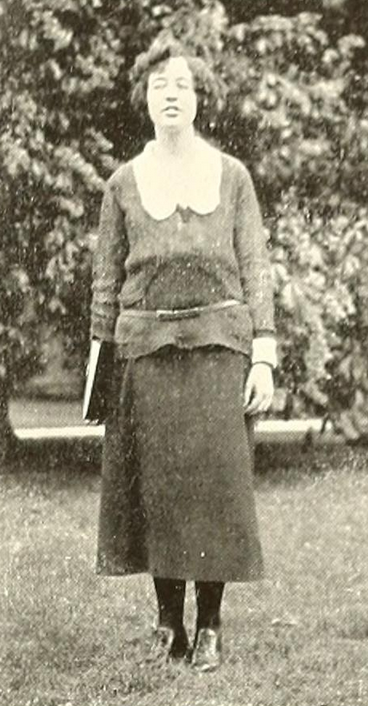
- Dessau, from the 1922 yearbook of Bryn Mawr College
- Born: September 28, 1900; New York, U.S.
- Died: December 30, 1980 (aged 80); Kyoto, Japan
- Occupations: Social worker, college professor

Dorothy Helen Dessau (September 28, 1900 – December 30, 1980) was an American social worker and college professor. She worked with survivors of the atomic bombing of Hiroshima. From 1951 to 1970, she was a professor of social work at Doshisha University.

== Early life and education ==
Dessau was born in New York City, the daughter of David Dessau and Harriet Elizabeth Abrahamson Dessau. Her father was born in Denmark and her mother was born in England. She graduated from Bryn Mawr College in 1922, and earned a Master of Social Work degree at Columbia University.

== Career ==
=== In the United States ===
Dessau was a member of the National Association of Social Workers beginning in 1925. During World War II, she traveled and lectured nationally as field secretary of the National Association of Day Nurseries. She emphasized the wartime advantages and the longterm value of quality childcare, saying "A well-rounded health program is one of the first requirements for a good day nursery. We're looking ahead twenty years, to try to avoid a repetition of the past two generations." She worked with the Newark Defense Council.

=== In China and Japan ===
Dessau worked in China for the United Nations in 1946 and 1947, as a child welfare specialist. in 1947, she worked in Japan with atomic bomb survivors in Hiroshima, and supervised the organization of local welfare agencies during the American occupation. She was a professor of social work at Doshisha University from 1951 to 1970. She established the Aoibashi Family Clinic in 1953, "the first institution for clinical social work in Japan". In 1974, she led workshops at a social work conference in San Francisco.

Dessau was recognized for her work in Japan by the United States government in 1974, and she received the Fifth Order of the Sacred Crown from the Japanese government in 1978.

== Publications ==
- "Glimpses of Japanese Family Life through Blue Eyes" (1970)
- Glimpses of Social Work in Japan (1968, editor)

== Personal life ==
Dessau died after a stroke in 1980, at the age of 80, in Kyoto.
