= Ernst Idla =

Estonian sport coach and sport pedagogue

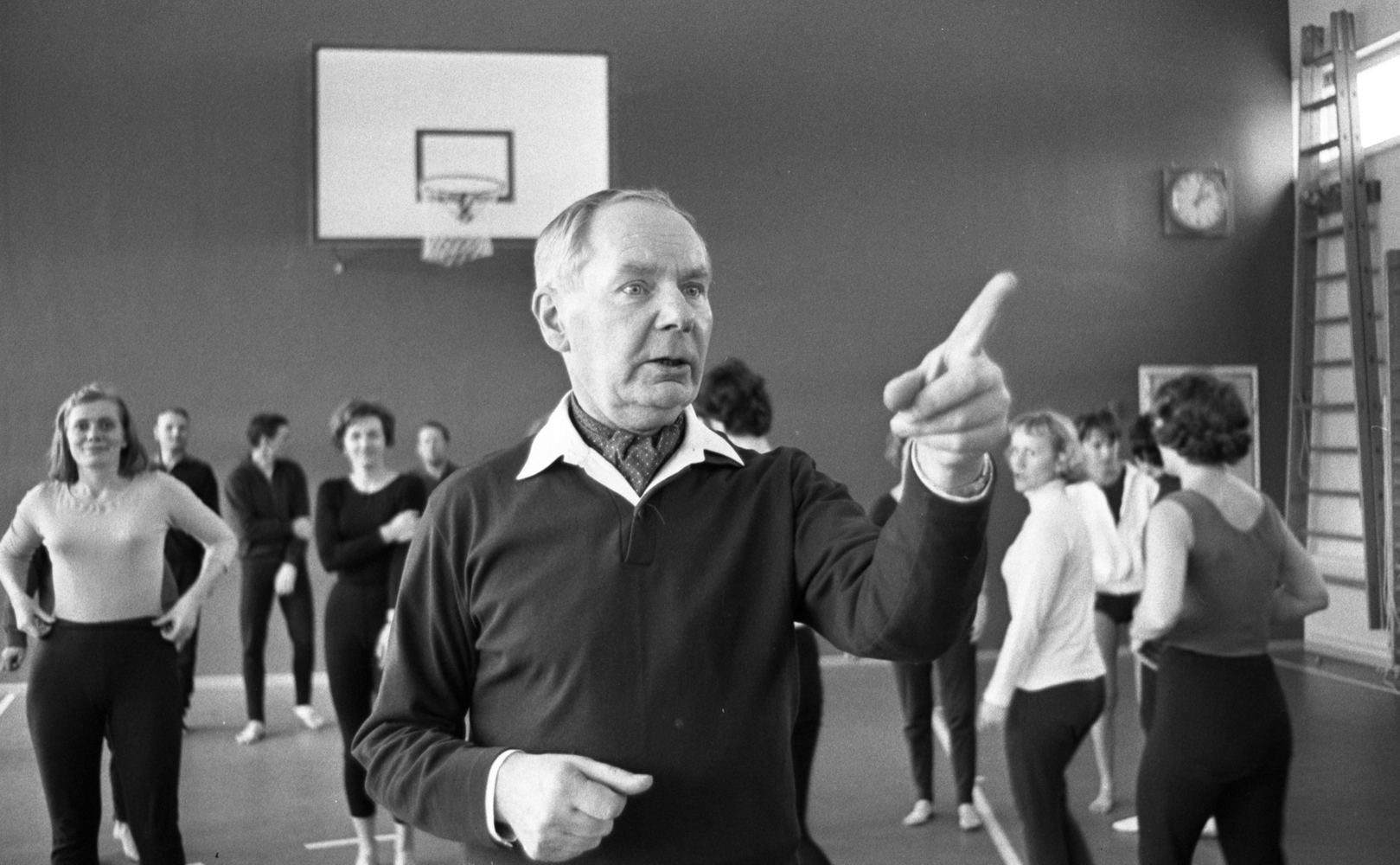
Ernst Idla in 1966

Ernst Idla (8 April 1901 – 5 December 1980) was an Estonian sport coach and sport pedagogue.

He was born in Särevere rural municipality, Järva County.

He participated on Estonian War of Independence, being a soldier in military unit called Kalevlaste Maleva.

In 1920s he was gymnastic pedagogue in several schools in Tallinn. In 1931 he established Tallinn Gymnastics Institute. In 1934 he initiated so-called radio gymnastics. He was one of the founders of Estonian Gymnasts' Federation.

In 1944 he fled to Sweden. In Sweden he directed Estonian gymnastic groups. In 1977, the gymnastic centre Idla Centre was established in Stockholm.

Awards:

- 1968: Order of Vasa, I rank
