= George W. Chapman (footballer) =

Australian rules footballer, born 1909

George Chapman

Personal information
- Full name: George William Frank Chapman
- Born: 2 July 1909; Salisbury, South Australia
- Died: 10 December 1980 (aged 71); Richmond, Victoria
- Original team: Port Adelaide
- Height: 180 cm (5 ft 11 in)
- Weight: 86 kg (190 lb)

Playing career^{1}
Years	Club	Games (Goals)
1930	Port Adelaide	
1931–35	St Kilda	32 (6)
- ^{1} Playing statistics correct to the end of 1935.

George William Frank Chapman (2 July 1909 – 10 December 1980) was an Australian rules footballer who played with St Kilda in the Victorian Football League (VFL) and Port Adelaide in the South Australian National Football League (SANFL).
