= Hans Fiederer =

German footballer

Personal information
- Date of birth: 21 January 1920
- Place of birth: Fürth, Germany
- Date of death: 15 December 1980 (aged 60)
- Position: Striker

Youth career
- 1928–1937: SpVgg Fürth

Senior career*
Years	Team	Apps	(Gls)
1937–1942	SpVgg Fürth	81	(44)

International career
1939–1941	Germany	6	(3)
- * Club domestic league appearances and goals

Hans Fiederer (21 January 1920 – 15 December 1980) was a German international footballer.
