= Leo Jansen =

Dutch artist (1930–1980)

Leo Jansen (30 April 1930, The Hague – 20 December 1980) was a Dutch artist known for his portraits.

== Childhood and education ==
Born in the Netherlands, moved to the Dutch East Indies (Indonesia) when he was ten. There in the tropics, he began his craft by sketching bronze-skinned Indonesian girls for leisure. He returned to the Netherlands to study at the Academy of Art, to refine his growing mastery of the female figures.

Like most continental artists, he gravitated first to Paris and quickly established himself as a portraitist of considerable talent. In 1962, he arrived in New York. Because of the softness and light he infused his portraits, he was chosen by several companies to do commemorative plates. Jansen is, perhaps, best known throughout the United States and Europe for his mother's day plates and puppies plate series.

== Notable works ==
Many of the rich and famous (such as Raquel Welch, Willian Holden, Donald Sutherland, Stephanie Powers, and the LA Times Hearst family. ) sought out Jansen for his portraiture skills, Jansen's sitting fee in the 1960 was US$20,000.

In addition, he also gained fame for his portraiture of The Beatles and The Rolling Stones. His Beatles portraits are among the more collectible memorabilia by fans. He was in great demand in the Los Angeles galleries, but sold primarily through Aaron Brothers.

== Painting ==
But despite his national reputation as a portrait artist, he refused many of those demand and resumed his childhood love affair of painting nudes. He then moved to Southern California. For eighteen years, he was commissioned by Playboy Magazine to paint the playmate of the month.

In his first six years, he was the artist chosen to paint 58 of the 72 portraits. His works hang in the Hugh Hefner's Playboy corporate headquarters and in the mansion. Rank among the nation's best interpretive artist of nudes, Jansen's canvases hang in collection of a wide range of notables from Jean-Claude Pascal to the late Judy Garland.

== Death ==
He died from an apparent heart attack in 1980 at 50 years of age.
