= Irvin F. Westheimer =

American businessman and philanthropist

Irvin Ferdinand Westheimer (September 19, 1879 – December 31, 1980) was an American businessman and social reformer, who is best remembered for being the founder of the Big Brothers Big Sisters of America.

== Biography ==
Westheimer, an American businessman, banker and philanthropist from Ohio, began the Big Brothers movement on July 4, 1903, when he discovered a young boy rummaging through a garbage pail outside the rear entrance to his office. Westheimer befriended the boy, who had no father, and began to urge his close friends to get involved as "big brothers" with other young boys from fatherless homes.

In 1908, Mrs. Cornelius Vanderbilt learned of the Big Brothers movement and organized the first "Big Sisters" program in New York City. The two organizations came together in 1977, and merged to become known as the Big Brothers/Big Sisters of America.

== Honours ==
Westheimer was honored by his native city of Cincinnati, Ohio as one of its most important people of the century in 2000. He died at the age of 101.
