= Maurice Voirin =

French politician

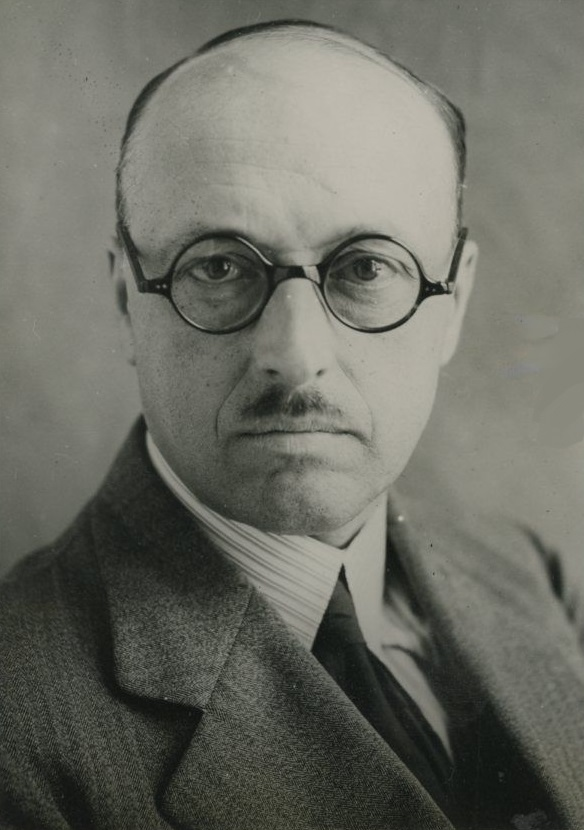
Maurice Voirin

Maurice Voirin (28 January 1891 – 19 December 1980) was a French politician.

Voirin was born in Noyers-Pont-Maugis. He represented the French Section of the Workers' International (SFIO) in the Chamber of Deputies from 1932 to 1940. On 10 July 1940 he voted in favour of granting the Cabinet presided by Marshal Philippe Pétain the authority to draw up a new constitution, thereby effectively ending the French Third Republic.
