= Joe Oakley =

Australian rules footballer, born 1914

Personal information
- Full name: Joseph Cornelius Oakley
- Born: 28 January 1914; Carlton, Victoria
- Died: 8 December 1980 (aged 66); Footscray, Victoria

Playing career^{1}
Years	Club	Games (Goals)
1934	Essendon	2 (2)
- ^{1} Playing statistics correct to the end of 1934.

Joseph Cornelius Oakley (28 January 1914 – 8 December 1980) was an Australian rules footballer who played with Essendon in the Victorian Football League (VFL).

== Family ==
The son of Joseph Thomas Oakley (1890–1959), and Theresa Veronica Oakley (1894–1988), née Yee Kee, Joseph Cornelius Oakley was born at Carlton, Victoria on 28 January 1914.

He married Florence Eugenia Dillon (1916–2008) in 1942.

== Football ==
=== Essendon (VFL) ===
Recruited from Sunbury, he played 2 games, and kicked 2 goals, for the Essendon First XVIII in 1934.

== Military service ==
Oakley later served in the Australian Army during World War II.
