= Gus Kuester =

American politician (1888–1980)

Member of the Iowa House of Representatives from the 30th district
- In office January 14, 1935 – January 13, 1957
- Preceded by: Charles E. Malone
- Succeeded by: Lester Kluever

Personal details
- Born: January 25, 1888 Cass County, Iowa, U.S.
- Died: December 21, 1980 (aged 92) Griswold, Iowa, U.S.
- Party: Republican

Gus Kuester (January 25, 1888 – December 21, 1980) was an American politician who served in the Iowa House of Representatives from the 30th district from 1935 to 1957.

He died on December 21, 1980, in Griswold, Iowa at age 92.
