= Robert H. Herman =

American author, biochemist, nutritionist, physician and soldier

- Born: Robert H. Herman; December 19, 1925; Chicago, Illinois, U.S.
- Died: December 25, 1980 (aged 55); San Francisco, California, U.S.
- Occupations: author; physician; scientist
- Years active: 1950–1980
- Known for: U.S. Army Medical and Nutrition Research Laboratory, Principles of Metabolic Control in Mammalian Systems
- Spouse: Yaye F. Tokuyama Herman (m. 1950–2007)

Robert H. Herman (December 19, 1925 – December 25, 1980) was an American author, biochemist, nutritionist, physician, soldier, and scientist. He was a gastroenterologist and expert in human nutrition with interests in food intolerance, gastrointestinal enzymes, inborn errors of metabolism, metabolic control, and lactase deficiency.

== Education ==
Herman earned a Bachelor of Science degree from the Illinois Institute of Technology, a Medical Doctor degree from the University of Illinois College of Medicine in Chicago, and served his medical internship at Walter Reed Army Medical Center in Washington D.C. Herman was married to Yaye F. Tokuyama Herman, who was his lifetime scientific collaborator. The two of them met while they were both students at the University of Chicago. His wife was also a member of the Women's Army Corps.

== Military service ==
Herman served in World War II as an enlisted person for two years, and spent most of his life on active duty in the United States Army Medical Corps. He played an important role in the development of one of the most advanced military nutrition and metabolism medical research units of its time, the U.S. Army Medical and Nutrition Research Laboratory. The laboratory was first built at Fitzsimmons Army Medical Center in Aurora, Colorado, and later at the Letterman Army Institute of Research of the Letterman Army Medical Center in San Francisco California. At the Letterman Army Institute of Research, Herman held the rank of colonel in the US Army and served as the director of the department of medicine.

== Theoretical biology ==
In 1980, Herman edited Principles of Metabolic Control in Mammalian Systems, with co-authors Robert M. Cohen and Pamela D. McNamara of the University of Pennsylvania. In chapter one, entitled The Principles of Metabolic Control, Herman wrote his propositions called the five "Fundamental Theorems of Theoretical Biology."

1. "The basic principles of chemistry and physics govern the chemical reactions and related processes that occur within the cell."
2. "...the sequential acquisition of biological function by proteins and nucleic acids is a reflection of the evolutionary sequence of development."
3. "...the continued synthesis and degradation of proteins and enzymes constitutes the life process by enabling the metabolic network to achieve negative entropy and remain in a far-from-equilibrium condition."
4. "...all disease is a consequence of at least one abnormality of at least one of biochemical function."
5. "...psychiatric disorders and mental illness have a biochemical basis, however poorly understood."

These theorems were discussed in the chapters in the book, including the final chapter written by Herman and Robert H. Cohn entitled, "The Biochemical Basis of Disease."

== American Society for Nutrition ==
Herman published numerous articles in American Journal of Clinical Nutrition, and served as the editor in chief of the American Journal of Clinical Nutrition. He died while in office in December 1980. At the time of his death, he was apparently the president of American Society for Nutrition.

== Awards ==
In 1981, The American Society for Nutrition awarded Herman posthumously with McCollum Award. It is an award for clinical investigators whose research has made important contributions to clinical nutrition in areas related to the biochemical and metabolic aspects of human nutrition. In 1980, Robert H. Herman was awarded the United States Army Legion of Merit.
