= Gokul Chand Mukerji =

- گۆکول چاند مکورجی
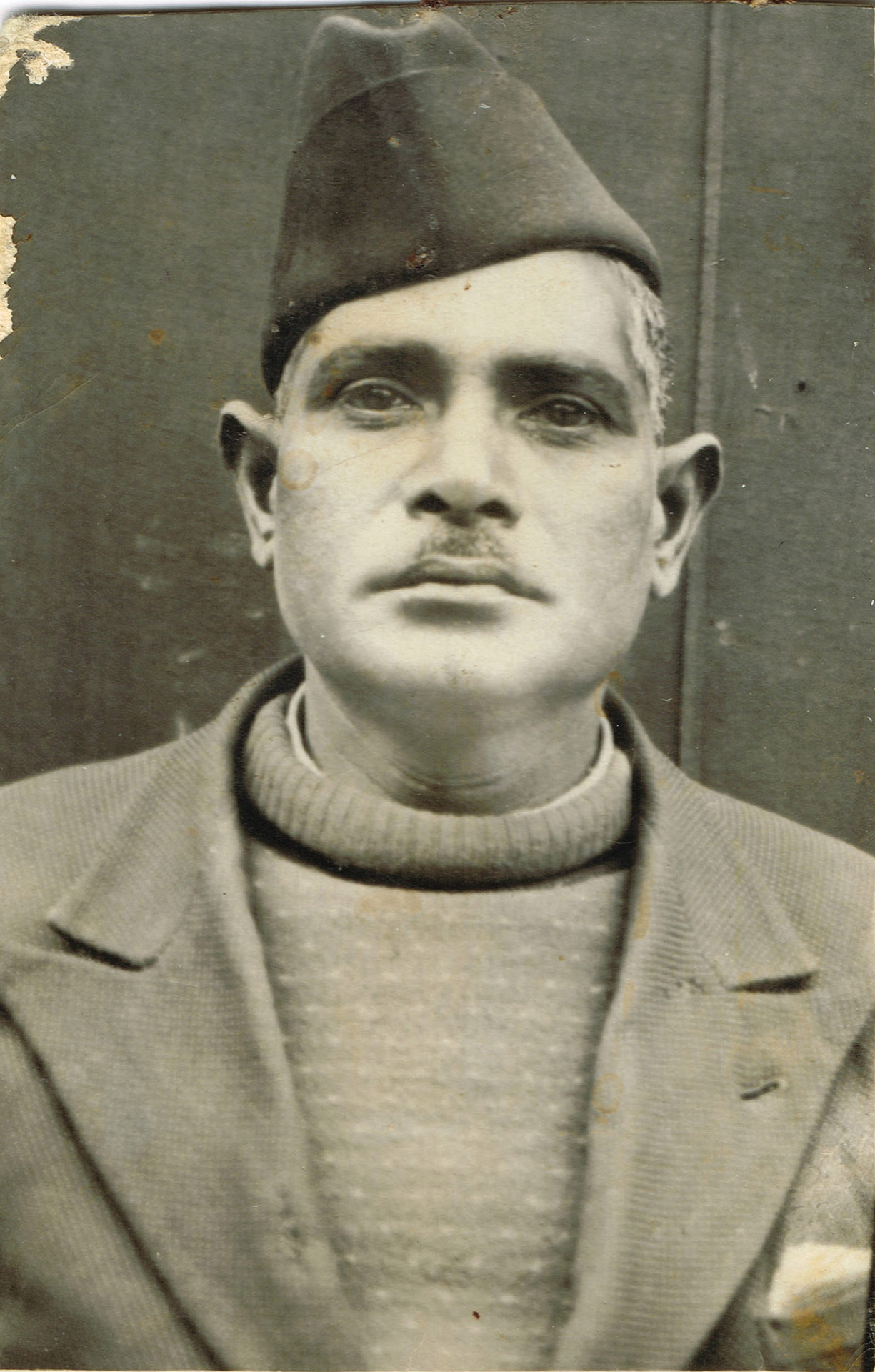
- Born: 1894; Manikganj District, Bengal Presidency, British India
- Died: 18 December 1980 (aged 85–86)
- Spouses: Haba Khan; Amina; Khairiya Ayiub Ghaiub
- Children: Kamal Mukerji; Shukriyah Mukerji

Signature
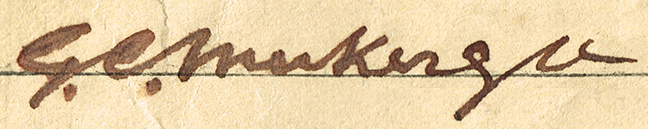

Gokul Chand Mukerji (Kurdish: گۆکول چاند مکورجی; 1894 – 18 December 1980) was an Indian mechanic, driver, driving instructor, and a soldier in the British army. ‌His rank was of a sepoy. He was sent to Iraq during the first world war as a British-Indian soldier. He was the first person to bring a car into the city of Sulaymaniyah – Iraq. Also, he was the first driving instructor in the same city. He held British-Indian nationality. He received the Kingdom of Iraq’s certificate of naturalization in 1932. Later in 1936, he received the Iraqi nationality copybook.

== Early life ==
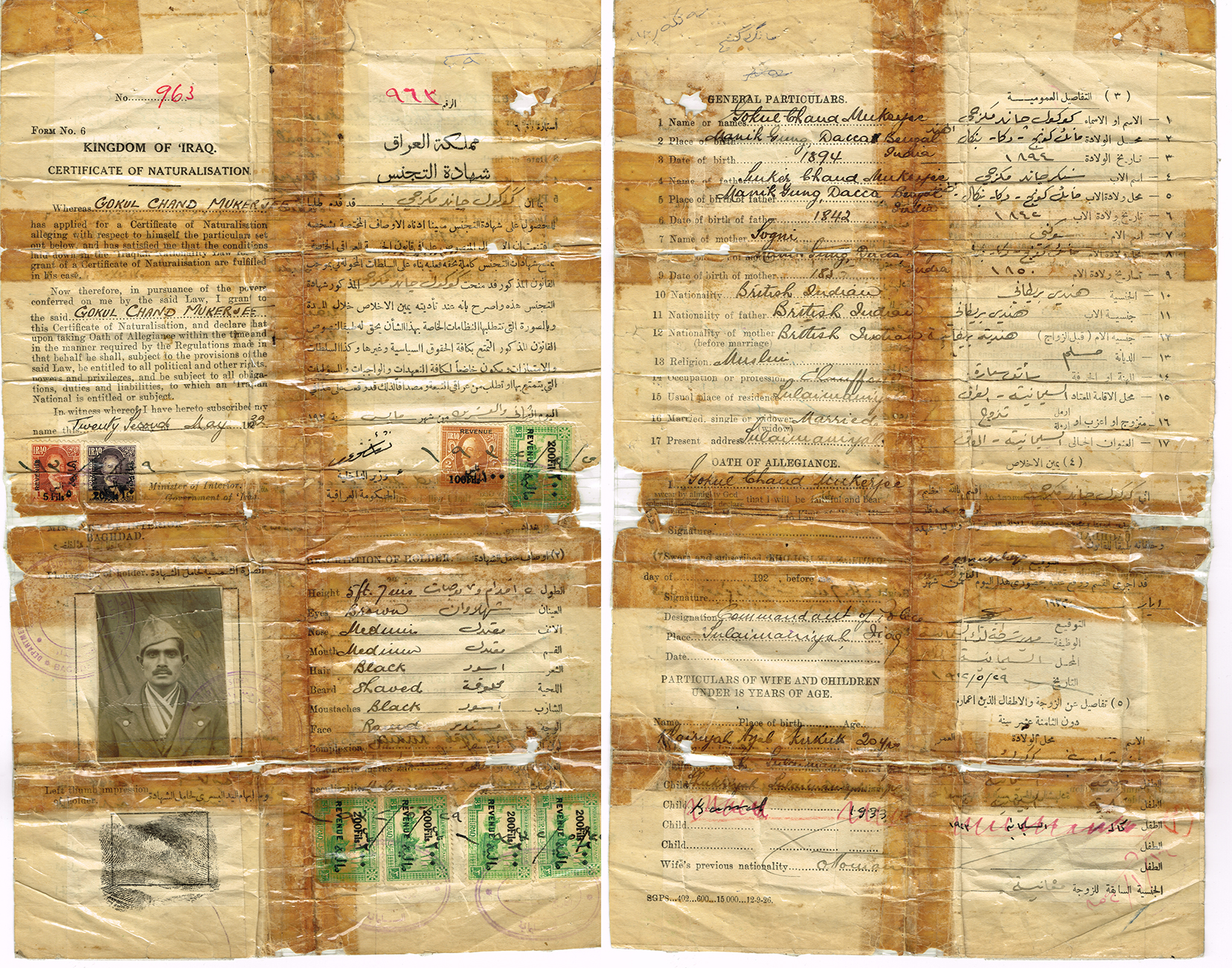
The Certificate of Naturalization of Mukerji in 1932 during the Kingdom of Iraq era preserved some information on his Indian background such as his parents' names and year of birth

Mukerji was born in Manikganj District, Dhaka, Bengal, British Raj (present Bangladesh) in 1894. The exact day and month of his birth remains unknown to this day. Dhaka was a part of the Indian subcontinent then. His mother, Sugni Sada, was born in 1850 and his father, Sankar Jand Mukerji, was born in 1842. His father was a policeman. Due to his job, he moved to Gaya city. Gokul Chand was the ninth child and the youngest of his family, having seven brothers and a sister. He finished primary school in Gaya. During his early childhood, his parents and some of his brothers died by the plague.

== Career ==
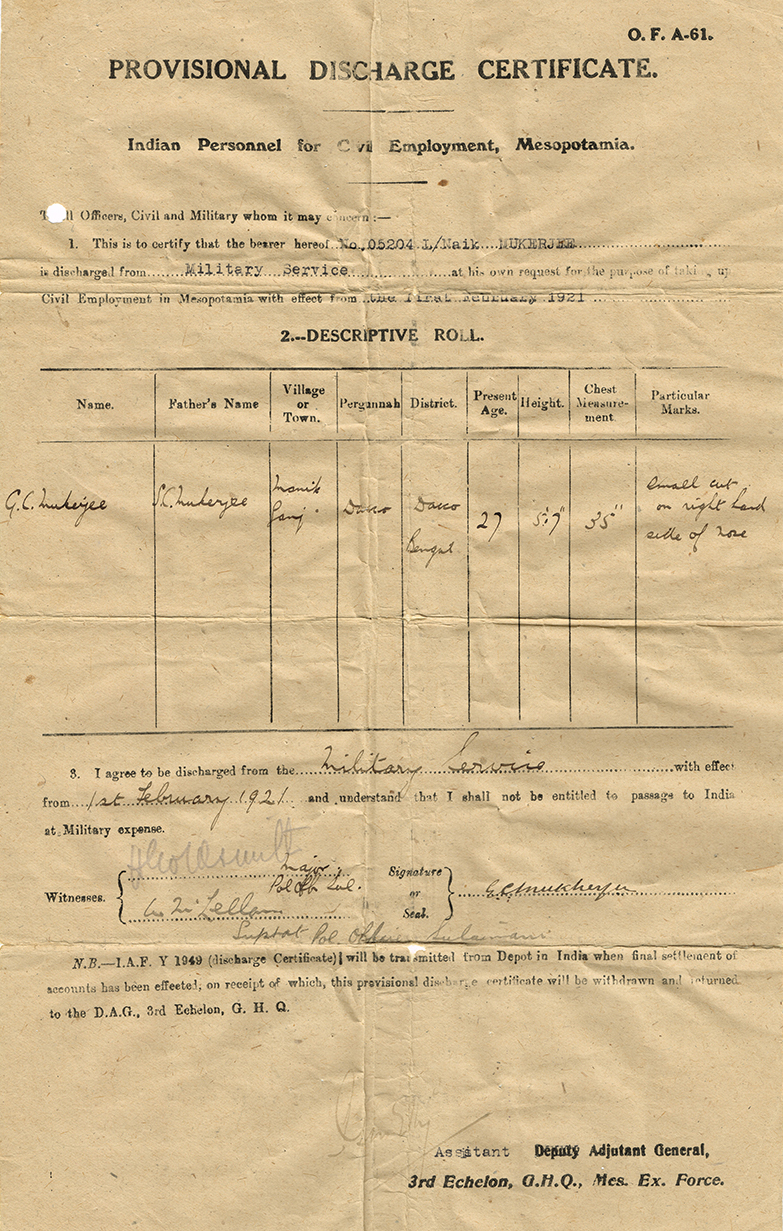
Mukerji's certificate of discharge from the British army

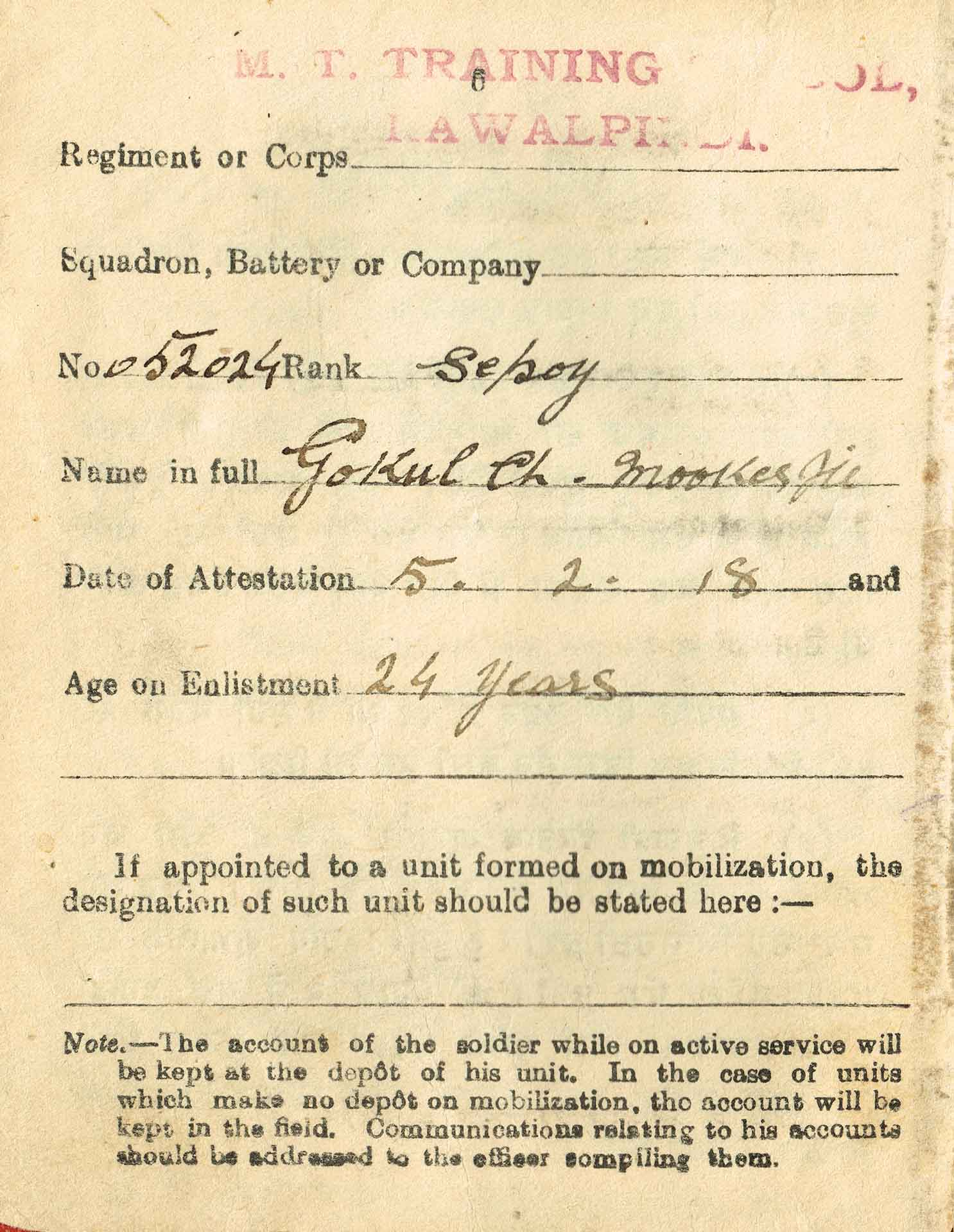
The fourth page of Mukerji's record on his Indian Soldier's pay book stating his record number, rank, date of attestation, age on enlistment, and his name with a different spelling "Mookerji"

After the tragedy of losing his parents and some of his brothers, Mukerji moved to Patna, to live with some relatives. The relatives were poor so he was forced to work from an early age. His first job was as a night watch at a directorate. His next position was as a petition clerk at the central post office, Gaya. His next job was as a ticket collector for trams. Later, on 5 February 1918, at the age of 24, he joined the British army as a sepoy. He was sent to Rawalpindi to take driving and mechanic courses. He was sent to Iraq in 1918.

In March 1919, he was sent to Sulaymaniyah from Baghdad upon Major Ely Bannister Soane's request. In Salihi Rasha's book of Sulaimaniyah city, he describes it this way:

"As we mentioned, in 1919 Major Soanne became the political officer of Sulaimaniyah city. He had two Indian drivers. because these two drivers left their damaged cars near Tasluja and Kandakawa destrict near Sulaimaniyah and failed to fix them, he punished both of them and sent them back to Baghdad while requesting for a very good driver who is also a very good mechanic and can speak a good English.

Meanwhile, there was a young Indian mechanic coming to Baghdad. He was going back and forth between his duty station which was the Indian force base (Rasheed air force base) to Bab Al-Moatham per his orders. Because this young man had a very good heart and gave rides to any women or children he found on his way, his hard hearted supervisor disliked this manner. As the Major Soanne's request arrived to the station, this supervisor called for the Indian young man and told him "I gave your name my good-hearted soldier to my supervisors, so they send you to a very disciplined and hard-hearted officer who is also very far away from Baghdad". Therefore after a few days, Gokul Chand Mukerji moved to Sulaimaniyah from Baghdad."

He was discharged from military service at his request and became a private citizen effective on 1 January 1921. Although the English army left Sulaymaniyah in 1922, he stayed there.

Mukerji gave his car as a gift to Sheikh Mahmud when he became the king of Kurdistan. Then he became his driver per Mahmud's request. Although the date of his resignation from being Sheikh Mahmud's driver is not known or confirmed to this date, but later on he started working as a freelance driver on the road between Halabja and Sulaimaniyah.

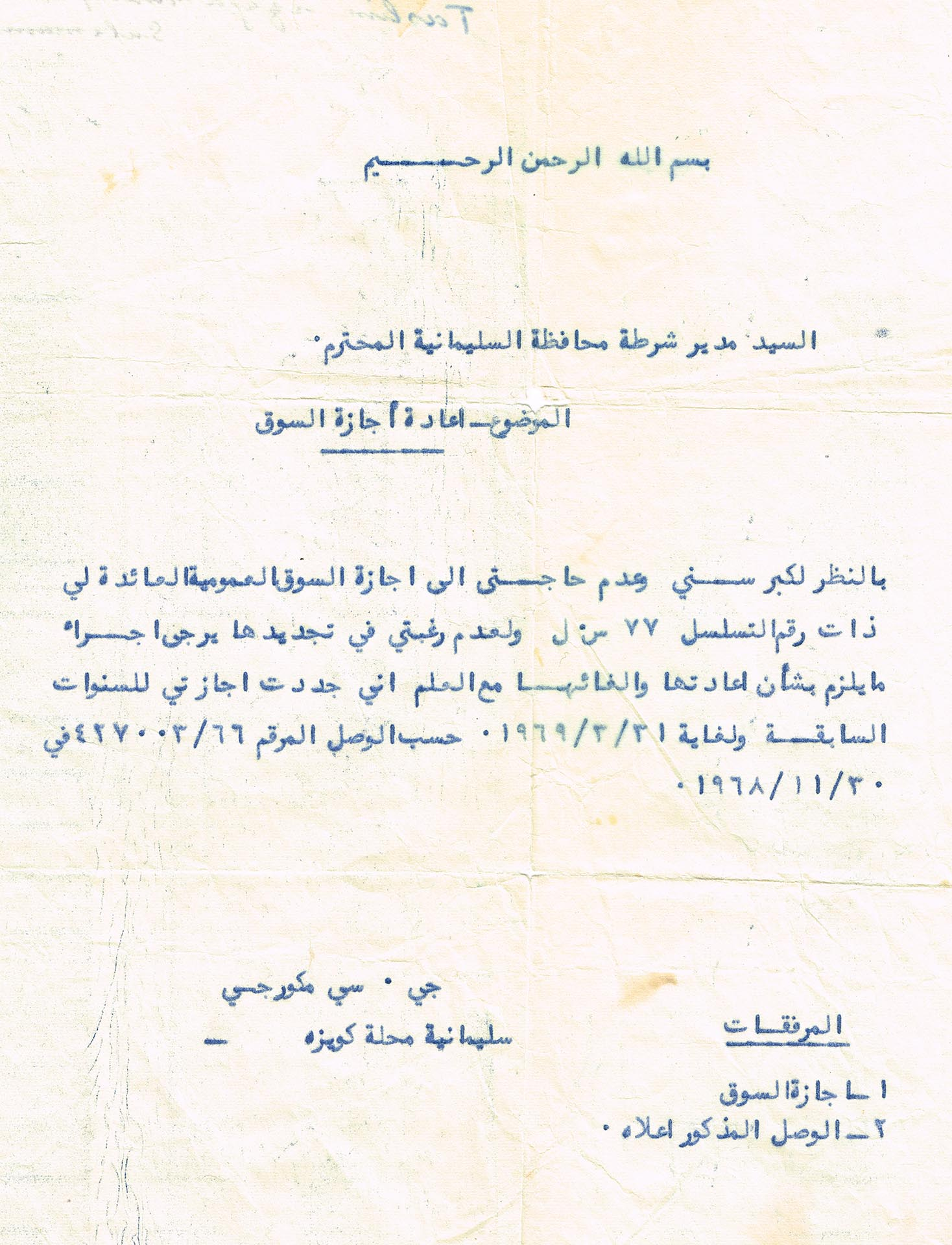
Mukerji's request for cancellation of his public driving license. Date is not mentioned, only the valid date of his driving license is mentioned which is 31 March 1968. The English Translation is as follows: "In the name of God the merciful the compassionate Dear Mr. Chief of Police of Sulaimaniyah, Subject: Returning the driving license As a regard to my old age and not necessity for the given Driving license for public driving, Series 77SL. As for my unwilling for renewing it, I request whatever procedure it takes to return it back to you and cancel it. FYI I renewed my license for the previous years that is valid till 31 March 1969. Per the receipt number 66/627003 in 30 November 1968. G. C Mukerji Sulaimaniyah, Goizha. Attachments: 1. Driving license. 2. The Mentioned receipt."

Mukerji requested for cancellation of his driving license that was valid until 31 March 1969. The date of his request is not confirmed, only the mentioned validity of his license number is mentioned.

== Moving to Iraq and Sulaymaniyah ==
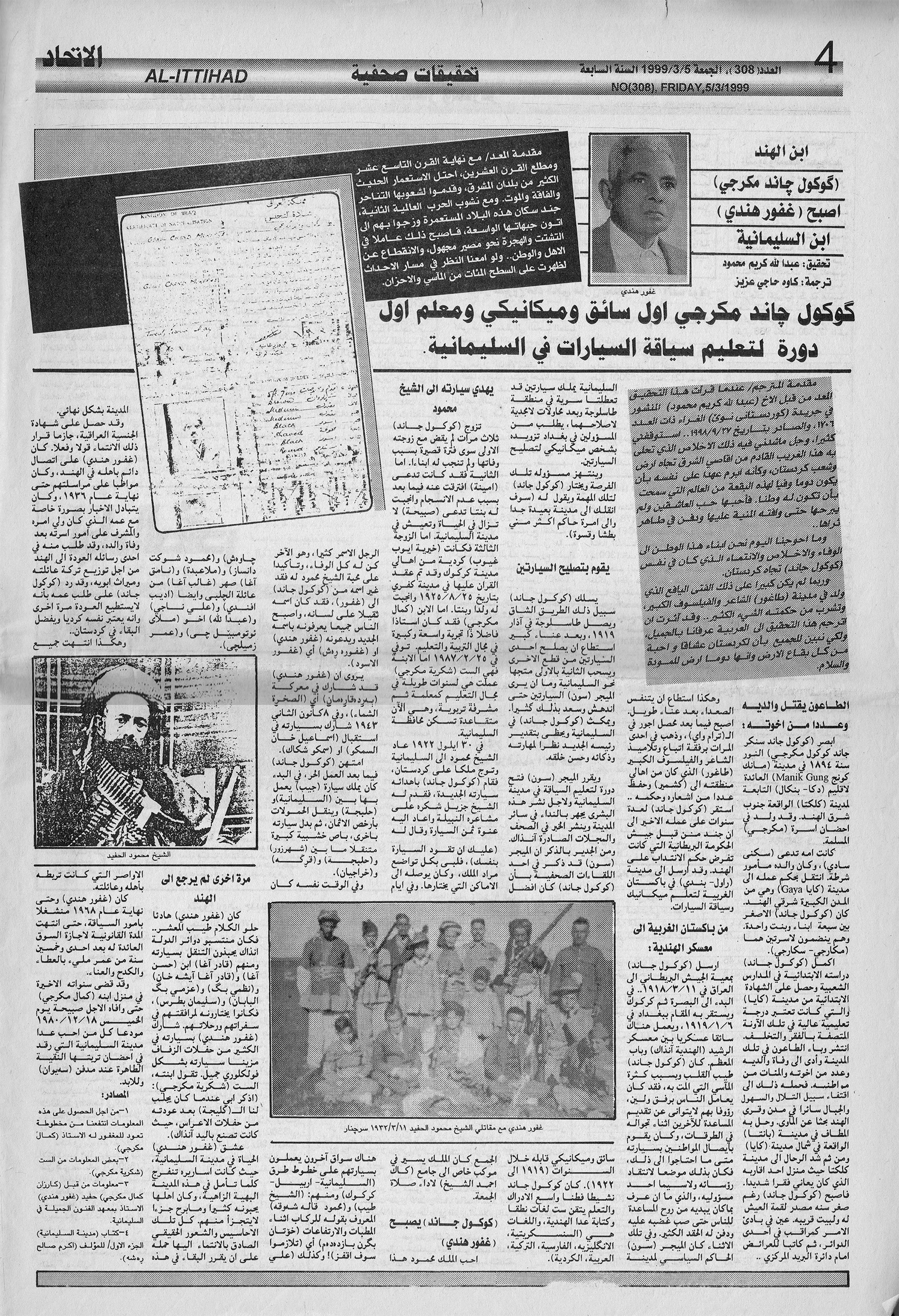
The story of Mukerji in Ittihad newspaper in Arabic

Mukerji was sent to Iraq on 11 March 1918. This date was recorded in his "Record of Movement" as the "Date of embarkation for field service"; otherwise, it is also stated that the "Date of leaving station for field station" is 4 March 1918. He was sent to Basra, then Kirkuk, and then Baghdad. He was appointed as a driver of the Rasheed air force base. It was called "Indian force base" then.

In the same year, Major Ely Bannister Soane, who was the political officer of Sulaymaniyah, had two Indian drivers. Their cars were irreparably damaged on the road of Tasluja and they left them there. This angered Major Soane, so he sent them back to Baghdad and requested a good driver and mechanic who can speak English. When this request arrived at the Indian force base, the supervising officer called for Mukerji.

A few days later, Mukerji was sent to Sulaymaniyah. He fixed one of the broken cars with pieces from the other one and towed the broken one into Sulaymaniyah city. Major Soane praised his wittiness and ordered that a course of driving shall be held in Sulaymaniyah by Mukerji. In March 1920, the course was held in Muhandis-khana.

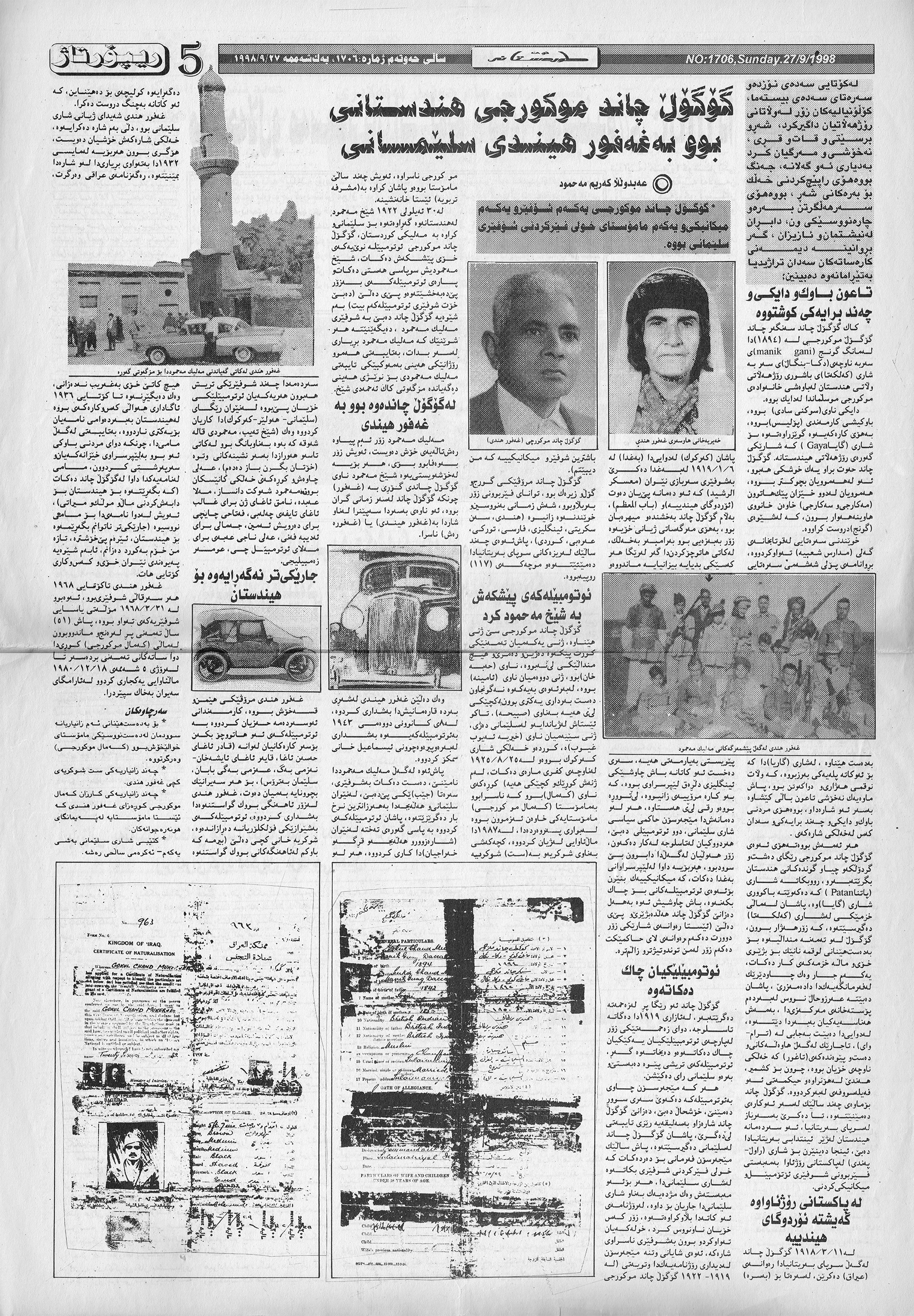
Mukerji's story in Kurdistani Nwe newspaper in Kurdish

On 1 January 1921, Mukerji was discharged from service at his request and became a private citizen. He bought some new cars and put them to work between Sulaymaniyah-Kirkuk, Kirkuk-Erbil, and Kirkuk-Kifri. During this time, he befriended Sheikh Mahmud Barzanji and his cousin Hapsa Naqib. Mukerji gave his car as a gift to Sheikh Mahmud, but he paid him back for it and requested that he become his driver. Sheikh Mahmud could not pronounce "Gokul Chand Mukerji" very well, so he gave him the nickname of "Ghafur Hindi" or "Ghafura Rash" (the black Ghafur). He was, thereafter, known by this nickname. In late 1968, he retired from work.

== Personal life ==
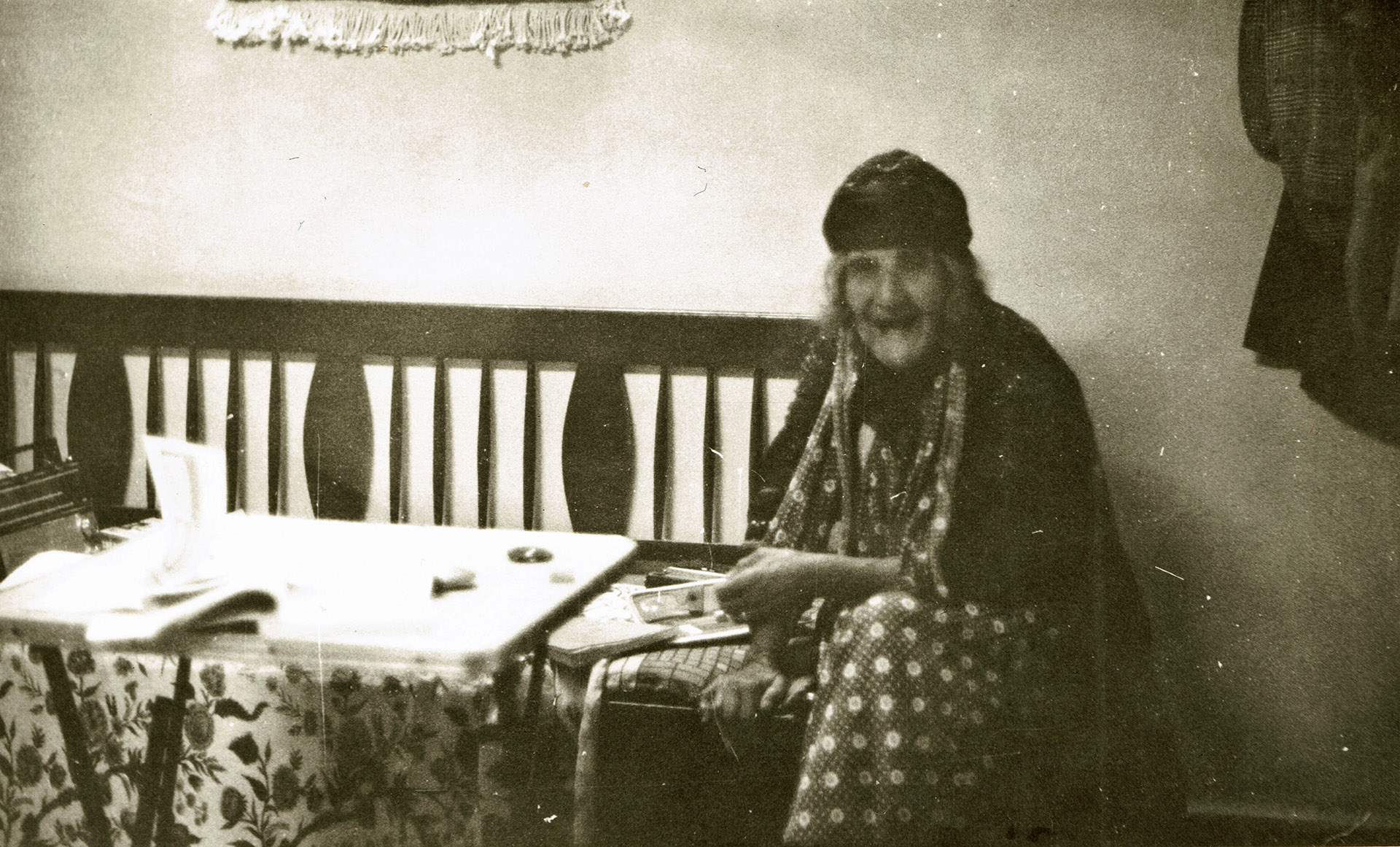
Khairiya Ayiub Ghaiub, Mukerji's third wife

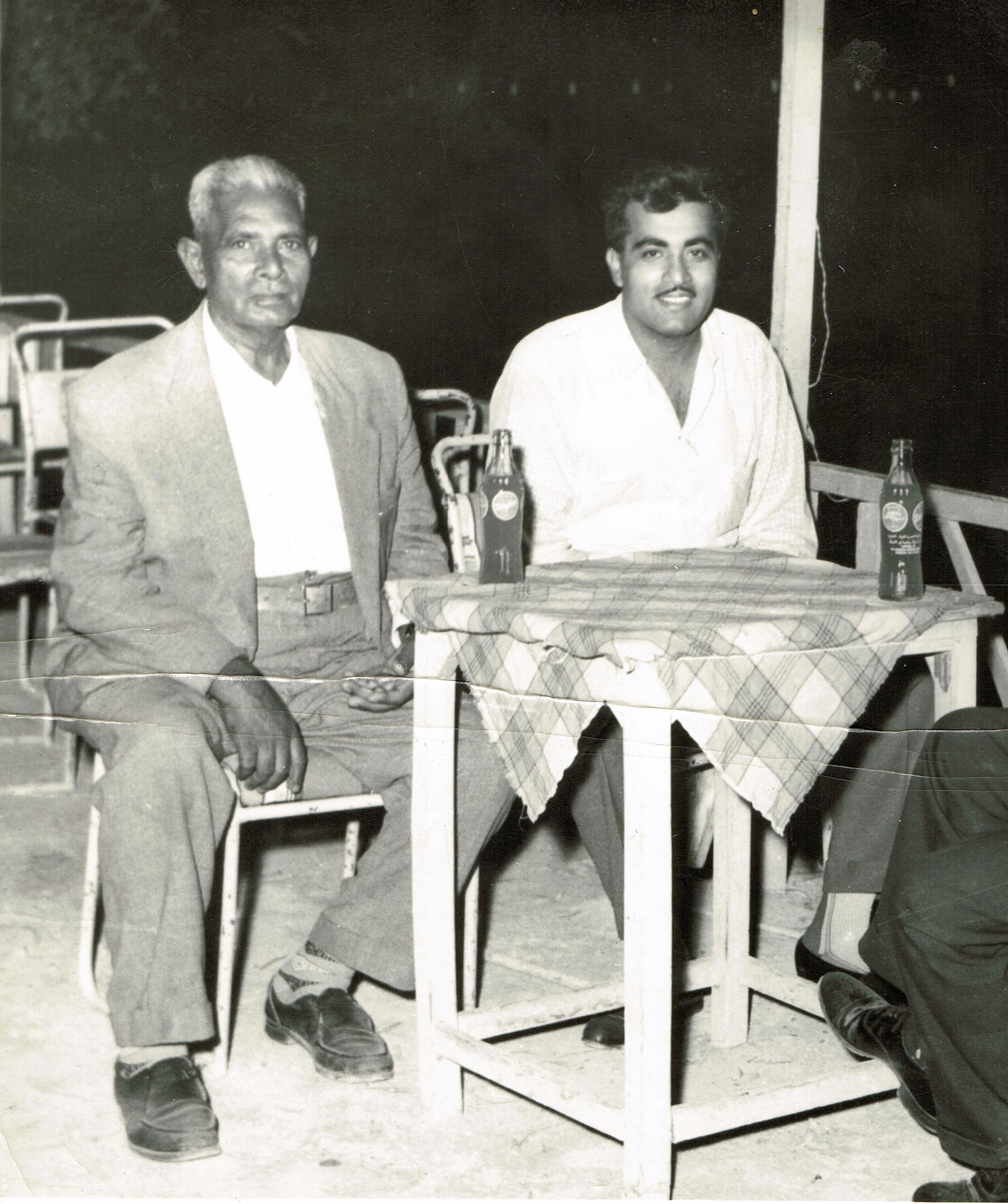
Mukerji with his son Kamal in Basrah, Iraq (1962)

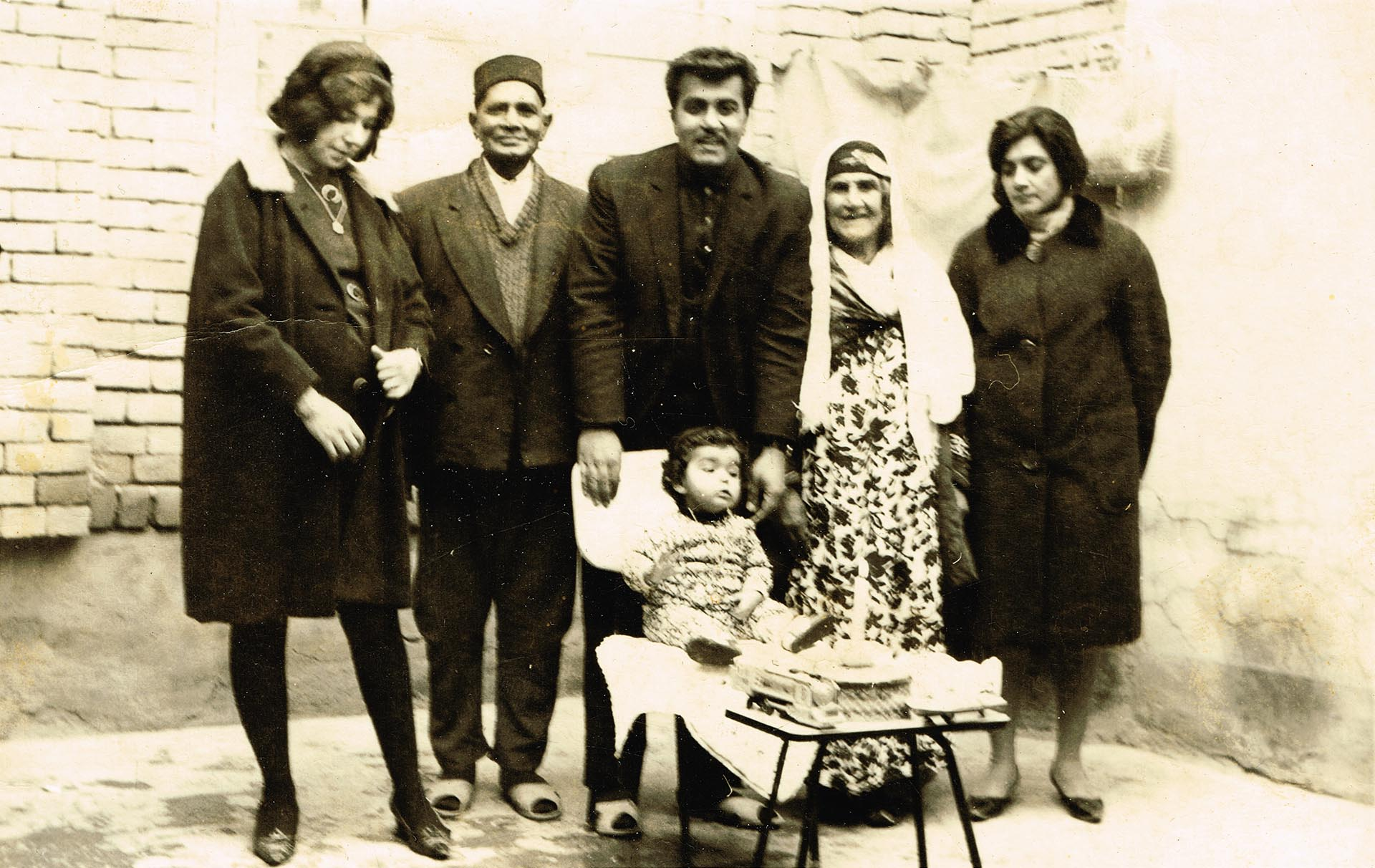
Mukerji with his family. from left to right: Atiya Faraj (daughter-in-law), G. C. Mukerji, Kamal Mukerji (son), Khairiyah Ayub (wife), Shukriyah Mukerji (daughter) and the toddler, Aso Mukerji (December 1967)

Mukerji married three times. His first name wife was Haba Khan, they were together for a short period of time as she died soon after the wedding. His second wife's name was Amina, they had a daughter (Sabiha), and were divorced later. On 25 August 1925, he married Khairiya Aiyub Ghaiyub, a woman from Kirkuk and they stayed together until his death. They had a daughter, (Shukriya Mukerji) and a son, (Kamal Mukerji). Gokul Chand Mukerji lived in the alley of Sabunkaran in Sulaymaniyah, but moved to Ali Naji alley in 1970. He died on 18 December 1980 and Khairiya died in August 1984. Mukerji's resting place is in Saiwan cemetery in Sulaymaniyah.

Mukerji was a big fan of Rabindranath Tagore and he memorized many of his works. He was fluent in Hindi, Sanskrit, Arabic, Kurdish, English, Persian and Turkish.
