= Robert Yendes =

American baseball player

- Pitcher
- Born: May 22, 1898; Kansas City, Kansas
- Died: December 30, 1980 (aged 82); San Diego, California

Negro league baseball debut
- 1917, for the All Nations

Last appearance
- 1917, for the All Nations

Teams
- All Nations (1917)

Robert Ozie Yendes (May 22, 1898 – December 30, 1980) was an American Negro league pitcher in the 1910s.

A native of Kansas City, Kansas, Yendes played in the Negro leagues for the All Nations club in 1917. He later played minor league baseball for the Topeka Kaws in 1922. Yendes died in San Diego, California in 1980 at age 82.
