= Tenis Melngailis =

Latvian chess player (1912–1980)

Personal information
- Born: 13 December 1912 Tashkent, Uzbekistan
- Died: 8 December 1980 (aged 67) Riga, Latvia

Chess career
- Country: Latvia

Tenis Vitauts Melngailis (13 December 1912 – 8 December 1980) was a Latvian chess player.

== Biography ==
Tenis Melngailis was a son of the famous Latvian composer Emilis Melngailis. Tenis was taught to play chess by his father, who himself was a strong chess player. In 1938, following the results of Latvian Chess Championship, Tenis Melngailis takes part in the 2nd international chess tournament in Ķemeri, where he shares 11th - 12th place in strong competition. In 1940, in Riga he stayed 7th place in the tournament of candidates for the Latvian national team.

Tenis Melngailis played for Latvia in the unofficial Chess Olympiad:

- In 1936, at first reserve board in the 3rd unofficial Chess Olympiad in Munich (+4, =1, -5).

Tenis Melngailis played for Latvia in the Chess Olympiad:

- In 1939, at reserve board in the 8th Chess Olympiad in Buenos Aires (+4, =3, -1).

During World War II from 1943 to 1944 Tenis Melngailis led the Chess Union of Latvia. In the first post-war years, he continues to actively participate in various chess tournaments. In 1946, in Riga, Tenis Melngailis won the Soviet tournament of I category and received the title of USSR candidate. In the same year he shared the 3rd - 5th place at the memorial of Fricis Apšenieks. In 1947, he shares the 3rd - 4th place at the memorial of Hermanis Matisons. In the 1940s and 1950s Tenis Melngailis led the chess section in the Latvian youth magazine Bērnība. In subsequent years, due to poor health, her results in chess tournaments have been declining, and since the mid-1950s he has gradually ceased his chess performances.

He was buried at Forest Cemetery in Riga.
