= Tubby Holden =

- Full name: Arthur William Holden
- Born: 8 April 1907 Christchurch, New Zealand
- Died: 27 July 1970 (aged 63) Invercargill, New Zealand
- Weight: 70 kg (154 lb)
- School: Otago Boys' High

Rugby union career
- Position: Halfback
Provincial / State sides
Years	Team	Apps	(Points)
1926-28	Otago	15	
1929-32	Southland	14	
International career
Years	Team	Apps	(Points)
1928	New Zealand	3	

Arthur William Holden (8 April 1907 — 27 July 1970) was a New Zealand international rugby union player.

Holden was born in Christchurch and attended Otago Boys' High School, where he was a member of their 1st XV in 1923 and 1924. He represented Otago while a varsity player at Otago University, then in 1929 switched to Southland when he took up a teaching position in Invercargill and joined local club Star.

A halfback, Holden won All Blacks selection in 1928 for their home series against New South Wales, making three uncapped appearances. He missed the cut for that year's tour of South Africa and didn't get any further opportunities.

== See also ==
- List of New Zealand national rugby union players
