= Rubens Pedrazzi =

Italian sculptor (1907–1980)

- Born: 27 June 1907; Modena, Italy
- Died: 17 December 1980 (aged 73); Modena, Italy
- Occupation: Sculptor

Rubens Pedrazzi (27 June 1907 – 17 December 1980) was an Italian sculptor. His work was part of the sculpture event in the art competition at the 1936 Summer Olympics.

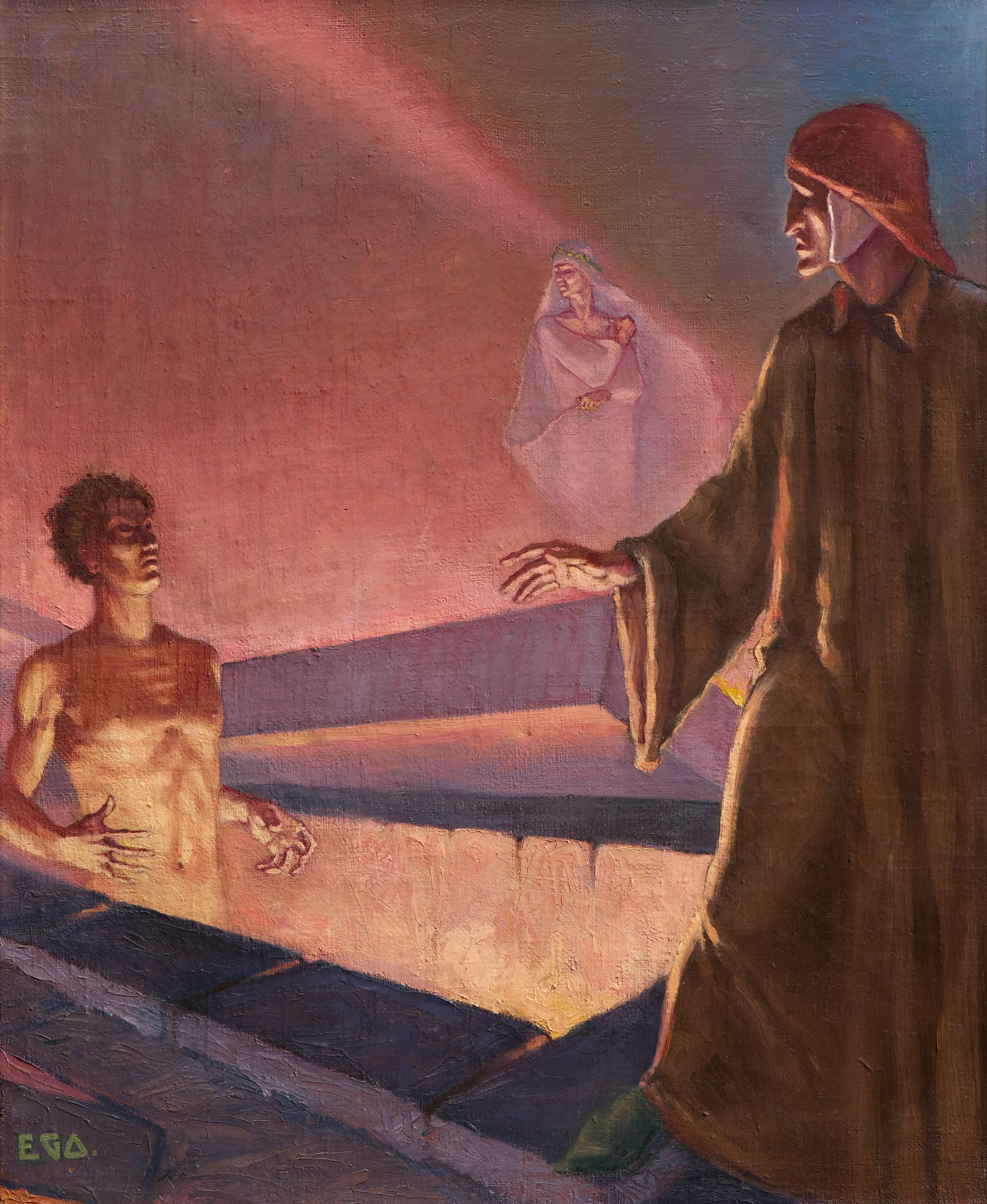
Rubens Pedrazzi, Episodio dantesco di Farinata ("Farinata degli Uberti Dantesque episode"), oil on canvas, 1929
