= List of players who appeared in only one game in the NFL (1930–1939) =

This is a list of American football players who played only one game in the National Football League (NFL) during the league's second decade from 1930 to the 1939. This list does not include those who were on an active roster but never actually appeared in a game. Nor does it include those who appeared only in a pre-season or exhibition game.

== Key ==
- Date - The "Date" column provides the date of the player's appearance in an NFL game. If the exact date has not yet been verified, then the column simply lists the year.
- Start - The "Start" column states whether or not the player's appearance in an NFL game was as a "starter". If the player appeared in the game as a substitute, the entry should state "No".

== 1930 ==
Name	Position	Team	Date	Start	College	Source
Walt Ambrose	Guard	Portsmouth Spartans	1930	No	Carroll	
Stub Blackman	Fullback	Chicago Bears	1930	No	Tulsa	
Phil Brennan	End	Newark Tornadoes	1930	No	Loyola Chicago	
Koester Christensen	End	Portsmouth Spartans	1930	No	Michigan State	
Fred Failing	Guard	Chicago Cardinals	1930	No	Central Michigan	
Fred Getz	End	Brooklyn Dodgers	1930	No	Chattanooga	
Aaron Grant	Center	Portsmouth Spartans	1930	No	Tennessee Wesleyan, Chattanooga	
John Law	Tackle	Newark Tornadoes	1930	No	Notre Dame	
Paul Liston	Guard	Newark Tornadoes	1930	No	Georgetown	
Jim Nicely	Tackle	Staten Island Stapletons	1930	No	Gettysburg	
Ken Provencial	End	Frankford Yellow Jackets	1930	No	Georgetown	
Jim Schuber	Halfback	Brooklyn Dodgers	1930	No	Navy	
Ronald Shearer	Tackle	Portsmouth Spartans	1930	No	Drake	
Hal Truesdell	Tackle	Minneapolis Red Jackets	1930	No	Hamline	
Eddie Wall	Back	Frankford Yellow Jackets	1930	No	Allegheny, Grove City	
Bill Wexler	Center	Providence Steam Roller	1930	No	NYU	

== 1931 ==
Name	Position	Team	Date	Start	College	Source
Irv Constantine	Halfback	Staten Island Stapletons	1931	No	Syracuse	
Fred DaGata	Fullback	Providence Steam Roller	1931	No	Boston College, Providence	
Fred Danziger	Fullback	Cleveland Indians	1931	No	Michigan State	
Hoot Herrin	Center, guard	Cleveland Indians	1931	No	Saint Mary's (CA)	
Buck Lamme	End	Cleveland Indians	1931	No	Ohio Wesleyan	
Franklin Lewis	Fullback	Cleveland Indians	1931	No	Purdue	
Gus Mastrogany	End	Chicago Bears	1931	No	Iowa	
Dutch Miller	Center	Portsmouth Spartans	1931	No	Wittenberg	
Don Ridler	Tackle	Cleveland Indians	1931	No	Michigan State	
Jim Tarr	End	Cleveland Indians	1931	No	Nevada (MO), Kemper Military School	
Drip Wilson	Center	Cleveland Indians	1931	No	None	

== 1932 ==
Name	Position	Team	Date	Start	College	Source
Bernie Leahy	Halfback	Chicago Bears	1932	No	Notre Dame	
Carmen Scardine	Back	Chicago Cardinals	1932	No	None	
Art Schiebel	Tackle	Staten Island Stapletons	1932	No	Colgate	
Ken Wendt	Guard	Chicago Cardinals	1932	No	Marquette	

== 1933 ==
Name	Position	Team	Date	Start	College	Source
Mil Berner	Center	Cincinnati Reds	1933	No	Syracuse	
Sam Cooper	Tackle	Pittsburgh Pirates	1933	No	Geneva	
Sonny Doell	Tackle	Cincinnati Reds	1933	No	Texas	
Porter Lainhart	Quarterback	Philadelphia Eagles	1933	No	Washington State	
Jim Letsinger	Guard	Pittsburgh Pirates	1933	Yes	Purdue	
Dick Marsh	Guard	New York Giants	1933	No	Oklahoma, Phillips	
Gil Robinson	End	Pittsburgh Pirates	1933	No	Catawba	
Tony Rovinski	End	New York Giants	1933	No	Holy Cross	
Mike Steponovich	Guard	Boston Redskins	1933	No	St. Mary's (CA)	
David Ward	End	Boston Redskins	1933	No	Haskell, New Mexico	
Tommy Whelan	Back	Pittsburgh Pirates	1933	No	Catholic	

== 1934 ==
Name	Position	Team	Date	Start	College	Source
Dan Barnhart	Back	Philadelphia Eagles	1934	No	St. Mary's (CA), Centenary	
Knuckles Boyle	Tackle	New York Giants	1934	No	Albright	
Chuck Brodnicki	Guard	Brooklyn Dodgers	1934	No	Villanova	
Len Gudd	End	Philadelphia Eagles	1934	No	Temple	
Lorne Johnson	Fullback	Philadelphia Eagles	1934	No	Temple	
Zvonimir Kvaternik	Guard	Pittsburgh Pirates	1934	No	Kansas	
Harry Marker	Back	Pittsburgh Pirates	1934	No	West Virginia	
Phil Poth	Guard	Philadelphia Eagles	1934	No	Gonzaga	
Bill Potts	Halfback	Pittsburgh Pirates	1934	No	Villanova	
Babe Scheuer	Tackle	New York Giants	1934	No	NYU	

== 1935 ==
Name	Position	Team	Date	Start	College	Source
Gene Augusterfer	Back	Pittsburgh Pirates	1935	No	Catholic University	
Les Borden	End	New York Giants	1935	No	Fordham	
Buster Maddox	Tackle	Green Bay Packers	1935	Yes	Kansas State	
Dustin McDonald	Guard	Green Bay Packers	1935	No	Indiana	
Aldo Richins	Back	Detroit Lions	1935	No	Utah	
Dominic Vairo	End	Green Bay Packers	1935	No	Notre Dame	

== 1936 ==
Name	Position	Team	Date	Start	College	Source
Bob Allman	End	Chicago Bears	1936	No	Michigan State	
Carl Kane	Back	Philadelphia Eagles	1936	No	Saint Louis	
Charlie McBride	Back	Chicago Cardinals	1936	No	Washington State	
Bob Tarrant	End	New York Giants	1936	No	Pittsburg State	

== 1937 ==
Name	Position	Team	Date	Start	College	Source
Hal Carlson	Guard	Chicago Cardinals	1937	No	Northwestern, DePaul	
Billy Harris	End	Pittsburgh Pirates	1937	No	Hardin-Simmons	
Fred King	Halfback	Brooklyn Dodgers	1937	No	Hobart	
Charlie Knox	Back	Philadelphia Eagles	1937	No		
Bill Muellner	End	Chicago Cardinals	1937	No	DePaul	
Charlie Payne	Wingback	Detroit Lions	1937	No	Detroit	
Ollie Savatsky	End	Cleveland Rams	1937	No	Miami (OH)	

== 1938 ==
Name	Position	Team	Date	Start	College	Source
Fred Borak	Defensive end	Green Bay Packers	1938	No	Wisconsin, Creighton	
Raymond Burnett	Halfback	Chicago Cardinals	1938	No	Arkansas Tech, Arkansas State Teachers	
Bill Fiedler	Guard	Philadelphia Eagles	1938	No	Penn	
Bob McGee	Tackle	Chicago Cardinals	1938	No	Santa Clara	

== 1939 ==
Name	Position	Team	Date	Start	College	Source
Earl Bartlett	Halfback	Pittsburgh Pirates	1939	Centre	No	
John Biolo	Guard	Green Bay Packers	1939	Lake Forest	No	
Rankin Britt	End	Philadelphia Eagles	1939	Texas A&M	No	
Don Cosner	Wingback	Chicago Cardinals	1939	Montana State	No	
Zed Coston	Center	Philadelphia Eagles	1939	Texas A&M	No	
Emmett Kriel	Guard	Philadelphia Eagles	1939	Baylor	No	
Charlie Gainor	Defensive end	Chicago Cardinals	1939	North Dakota	No	
Glynn Rogers	Guard	Chicago Cardinals	1939	TCU	Yes	
Karl Schuelke	Fullback	Pittsburgh Pirates	1939	Wisconsin	No	
Anton Stolfa	Quarterback	Chicago Bears	1939	Luther	no	
Steve Uhrinyak	Guard	Washington Redskins	1939	Franklin & Marshall	No	
John Wiatrak	Center	Detroit Lions	1939	Washington	No	

== See also ==
- List of players who appeared in only one game in the NFL (1920–1929)
