= 1930 Portsmouth Spartans season =

NFL team season

- Head coach: Hal Griffen
- Home stadium: Universal Stadium

Results
- Record: 5–6–3
- League place: 7th NFL

The 1930 Portsmouth Spartans season was the inaugural season for the Portsmouth Spartans in the National Football League (NFL), joining on July 12, 1930. Despite holding a 4–1–1 record going into Week 6, tied for 2nd in the league, the Spartans managed only 1 more win as they finished 5–6–3, seventh in the NFL.

The Spartans scored 176 points which ranked third in the NFL, while the defense allowed 161 points which was eighth in the league.. The last remaining active member of the 1930 Portsmouth Spartans was running back Father Lumpkin, who retired after the 1937 season.

== Roster ==
1930 Portsmouth Spartans roster
Backs: 21 Chuck Bennett TB; 52 Ebby DeWeese BB; 20 Byron Eby; 22 Bill Glassgow WB; 23 Cy Kahl BB; 26 Tiny Lewis BB; 24 Father Lumpkin FB; 25 Mayes McLain; 27 Ray Novotny; 20 Frosty Peters	Linemen: –– Walt Ambrose G; 72 Chuck Braidwood E; 41 Richard Brown C; –– Koester Christensen E; 52 Ebby DeWeese G; 12 Forrest Douds; –– Harold Fenner E; –– Lee Fenner E; 53 Bill Fleckenstein; 53 Al Graham G; 85 Hal Griffen; –– Aaron Grant C; 62 Duke Hanny; 60 Dud Harris RT; –– George Hastings T; 71 Lou Jennings	Linemen (cont'd): 62 Spider Johnson T; 70 Red Joseph; 63 Babe Lyon RT; 73 Emil Mayer E; 51 Ernie Meyer LG; 53 Carroll Ringwalt; 50 Fred Roberts G; 83 Sod Ryan T; 61 Vin Schleusner LT; –– Ronald Shearer T; 51 Gene Smith G; 85 Buck Weaver G; 40 Bull Wesley G; rookies in italics

== Schedule ==
=== Regular season ===
Game	Date	Opponent	Result	Record	Venue	Recap
1	September 14	Newark Tornadoes	W 13–6	1–0	Universal Stadium	Recap
2	September 24	Brooklyn Dodgers	W 12–0	2–0	Universal Stadium	Recap
3	October 5	Chicago Cardinals	T 0–0	2–0–1	Universal Stadium	Recap
4	October 8	Frankford Yellow Jackets	W 39–7	3–0–1	Universal Stadium	Recap
5	October 12	at Minneapolis Red Jackets	L 0–13	3–1–1	Nicollet Park	Recap
6	October 22	Chicago Bears	W 7–6	4–1–1	Universal Stadium	Recap
7	October 26	at Chicago Cardinals	L 13–23	4–2–1	Comiskey Park	Recap
8	November 2	at Green Bay Packers	L 13–47	4–3–1	City Stadium	Recap
9	November 5	New York Giants	L 6–19	4–4–1	Universal Stadium	Recap
10	November 9	at Staten Island Stapletons	T 13–13	4–4–2	Thompson Stadium	Recap
11	November 15	at Frankford Yellow Jackets	L 6–7	4–5–2	Frankford Stadium	Recap
12	November 30	at Chicago Bears	L 6–14	4–6–2	Wrigley Field	Recap
13	December 7	Minneapolis Red Jackets	W 42–0	5–6–2	Universal Stadium	Recap
14	December 14	Green Bay Packers	T 6–6	5–6–3	Universal Stadium	Recap

=== Game summaries ===
==== Week 1: vs. Newark Tornadoes ====
Week 1: Newark Tornadoes at Portsmouth Spartans – Game summary

Quarter	1	2	3	4	Total
Tornadoes	0	0	0	6	6
Spartans	0	0	7	6	13

at Spartan Municipal Stadium

- Date: September 14, 1930
- Game attendance: 4,000
- Box score

Game information
First quarter
- No scoring plays

Second quarter

- No scoring plays

Third quarter

- PRT – Chuck Bennett 11-yard pass from Bill Glassgow (Tiny Lewis kick good). Portsmouth 7–0.

Fourth quarter

- PRT – Byron Eby 55-yard pass from Ray Novotny (Kick blocked). Portsmouth 13–0.
- TOR – Frank Kirkleski 15-yard rush (Kick missed). Portsmouth 13–6.

In Week 1 of their inaugural season, the Spartans hosted the Newark Tornadoes. No scoring was seen in the first half, but the Tornadoes threatened to score in the second quarter, getting down to the Spartans 3-yard line. A fumble recovery and a six-yard loss had the Tornadoes try for a 5-yard field goal attempt, but the drop kick missed wide. In the second half, Bill Glassgow returned a punt from their own 45 to the Tornadoes 20-yard line. But the drive ended on a fumble recovered by the Tornadoes. On the Spartans ensuing drive, two gains of 15 yards and 10 yards set up the 11-yard touchdown pass from Glassgow to Chuck Bennett to put the Spartans up 7–0. Moving into the fourth quarter, Ray Novotny threw a pass to Byron Eby that went for 55 yards and the touchdown, bringing the Portsmouth lead to 13–0 after a blocked extra point. With three minutes left in the game, Newark's Ted Mitchell intercepted a pass and returned it 50 yards before being tackled. The Tornadoes scored on a 15-yard rushing touchdown to bring the score to 13–6, which was the final.

==== Week 2: vs. Brooklyn Dodgers ====
Week 2: Brooklyn Dodgers at Portsmouth Spartans – Game summary

Quarter	1	2	3	4	Total
Dodgers	0	0	0	0	0
Spartans	6	0	0	6	12

at Spartan Municipal Stadium

- Date: September 24, 1930
- Game attendance: 6,000
- Box score

Game information
First quarter
- PRT – Chuck Bennett 41-yard interception return (Kick missed). Portsmouth 6–0

Second quarter

- No scoring plays

Third quarter

- No scoring plays

Fourth quarter

- PRT – Bill Glassgow 29-yard rush (Kick missed). Portsmouth 12–0.

In Week 2, the Spartans hosted the Brooklyn Dodgers. The Spartans got the ball to start the game, but turned it over on downs. On Brooklyn's ensuing drive, Chuck Bennett intercepted a pass, returning it for a touchdown to put the Spartans up 6–0. The second half resulted in no scoring with a good amount of fumbling. Late in the third quarter, Father Lumpkin intercepted a pass, bringing it to Brooklyn's 47-yard line. A Bennett rush to the 29-yard line ended the third quarter. On the first play of the fourth quarter, Bill Glassgow ran into the endzone for the score to bring the Portsmouth lead to 12–0, which was the final.

=== Standings ===
NFL standings
	W	L	T	PCT	PF	PA	STK
Green Bay Packers	10	3	1	.769	234	111	T1
New York Giants	13	4	0	.765	308	98	L1
Chicago Bears	9	4	1	.692	169	71	W5
Brooklyn Dodgers	7	4	1	.636	154	59	L1
Providence Steam Roller	6	4	1	.600	90	125	L1
Staten Island Stapletons	5	5	2	.500	95	112	L1
Chicago Cardinals	5	6	2	.455	128	132	L1
Portsmouth Spartans	5	6	3	.455	176	161	T1
Frankford Yellow Jackets	4	13	1	.235	113	321	T1
Minneapolis Red Jackets	1	7	1	.125	27	165	L6
Newark Tornadoes	1	10	1	.091	51	190	L6

Note: Tie games were not officially counted in the standings until 1972.
