= 1930 Staten Island Stapletons season =

National Football League team season

- Head coach: Doug Wycoff
- Home stadium: Thompson Stadium

Results
- Record: 5–5–2
- League place: 6th NFL

The 1930 Staten Island Stapletons season was their second in the league. The team improved on their previous output of 3–4–3, winning five games. They finished sixth in the league.

== Schedule ==
Game	Date	Opponent	Result	Record	Venue	Game Recap
1	September 21	Newark Tornadoes	W 12–6	1–0	Thompson Stadium	Recap
2	September 27	at Frankford Yellow Jackets	L 3–7	1–1	Frankford Stadium	Recap
3	September 28	Frankford Yellow Jackets	W 21–0	2–1	Thompson Stadium	Recap
4	October 1	at Newark Tornadoes	T 7–7	2–1–1	Newark Schools Stadium	Recap
5	October 5	Brooklyn Dodgers	L 0–20	2–2–1	Thompson Stadium	Recap
6	October 19	at Providence Steam Roller	L 6–7	2–3–1	Cycledrome	Recap
7	October 26	at Newark Tornadoes	W 6–0	3–3–1	Newark Velodrome	Recap
8	November 2	at New York Giants	L 7–9	3–4–1	Polo Grounds	Recap
9	November 9	Portsmouth Spartans	T 13–13	3–4–2	Thompson Stadium	Recap
10	November 23	at Brooklyn Dodgers	W 6–0	4–4–2	Ebbets Field	Recap
11	November 27	New York Giants	W 7–6	5–4–2	Thompson Stadium	Recap
12	November 30	Green Bay Packers	L 7–37	5–5–2	Thompson Stadium	Recap

== Roster ==
1930 Staten Island Stapletons final roster
Backs: 8 Ralph Buckley RB/CB/S; 5 Bernie Finn RB/S; 6 Beryl Follet RB/CB/S; 4 Snitz Snyder FB/LB; 2 Ken Strong RB/CB/S/K; 3 Doug Wycoff FB/LB	Linemen: 11 Fred Brown G/DG; 17 John Bunyan G/DG; 13 John Demmy T/DT; 19 Jim Fitzgerald C/MG; 10 Bing Miller T/DT; 20 Dave Myers G/DG; 18 Herb Rapp C/MG; 12 Ollie Satenstein G/DG; 14 Cy Williams T/DT	Ends/Receivers: 9 Julie Archoska; 16 Harry Kloppenburg; 15 Ed Lawrence; 1 Bob Lundell; 7 Sammy Stein; Rookies in italics

== Standings ==
NFL standings
	W	L	T	PCT	PF	PA	STK
Green Bay Packers	10	3	1	.769	234	111	T1
New York Giants	13	4	0	.765	308	98	L1
Chicago Bears	9	4	1	.692	169	71	W5
Brooklyn Dodgers	7	4	1	.636	154	59	L1
Providence Steam Roller	6	4	1	.600	90	125	L1
Staten Island Stapletons	5	5	2	.500	95	112	L1
Chicago Cardinals	5	6	2	.455	128	132	L1
Portsmouth Spartans	5	6	3	.455	176	161	T1
Frankford Yellow Jackets	4	13	1	.235	113	321	T1
Minneapolis Red Jackets	1	7	1	.125	27	165	L6
Newark Tornadoes	1	10	1	.091	51	190	L6

Note: Tie games were not officially counted in the standings until 1972.
