= Len Grant =

American football player (1906–1938)

- Grant in 1936

No. 3
- Position: Offensive tackle

Personal information
- Born: January 17, 1906; Boston, Massachusetts, U.S.
- Died: August 6, 1938 (aged 32); Dedham, Massachusetts, U.S.
- Listed height: 6 ft 3 in (1.91 m)
- Listed weight: 235 lb (107 kg)

Career information
- High school: Dedham (MA)
- College: NYU

Career history
- New York Giants (1930–1937)

Awards and highlights
- NFL champion (1934); First-team All-Pro (1931, 1932); Second-team All-Pro (1933)

Career statistics
- Games played: 92
- Starts: 68
- Stats at Pro Football Reference

Leonard T. "Fish" Grant (January 17, 1906 – August 6, 1938) was an American professional football offensive tackle in the National Football League (NFL) for the New York Giants. He was a member of the Giants' 1934 NFL Championship team and was twice named by United Press International as a first team All-Pro.

While still active as a professional football player ahead of the 1938 NFL season, Grant was killed in a lightning strike while golfing. His jersey #3 was retired by the Giants at the time of his death, but was returned to use in 1966.

== Biography ==
Len Grant was born in Boston, Massachusetts. He grew up in the town of Dedham, located about 10 miles southwest of that city, and attended Dedham High School.

Grant attended New York University, where he played football and boxed, eventually becoming the national intercollegiate boxing champion for the heavyweight division. He played for the NYU varsity football team from 1927 through 1929, captaining the Violets during his senior season.

In 1930, with the NFL roster limit raised from 18 players to 20, Grant managed to win a spot with the New York Football Giants—another big man on a big line that included two players weighing in over 230 pounds, Saul Mielziner and Les Caywood. Grant would become the team's regular left tackle, seeing action in 12 of the 17 games played by the team during the 1930 season, with 8 starts. He would remain ensconced at left tackle for the next four years, moving to the right side of the line in 1935 season. Grant would start a majority of games each season for the duration of his career at his designated position, but would sometimes come off the bench as a reserve, depending on health and the strategic needs of the team.

He was named a first-team All-Pro by United Press International for his play in the 1931 and 1932 seasons. He was also named a second-team All-Pro by the league in 1933.

Grant was a reserve for the Giants in the 1934 NFL Championship Game, a victory over the Chicago Bears remembered in NFL lore as the "sneakers game" due to the Giants switching to non-cleated shoes to maintain better traction on the icy turf.

By 1937 the play of the 31-year old Grant was starting to decline, but head coach Steve Owen appreciated the tackle so much that he made him an assistant coach, rather than release him.

The 1937 Giants finished with a record of 6–3–2, good enough for second place in the NFL's Eastern Division. A playoff game between the Giants and the division-leading Washington Redskins followed—won decisively by the Redskins, 49–14. It would be the last football game of Len Grant's life.

Grant's career came to an abrupt end on August 6, 1938, shortly before the start of Giants training camp for the 1938 NFL season. Playing golf as part of a foursome on a local course at Dedham, Massachusetts, a thunderstorm broke out while the group was walking the fourth fairway. A bolt of lightning directly hit the footballer, with his caddy suffering burns on his foot and being thrown 15 feet by the force of the blast. Grant was killed immediately, with doctors working without success for nearly an hour to revive him before making the final pronouncement.

Grant's jersey #3 was retired by the team in 1938, but was returned to service in 1966 at the request of Giants placekicker Pete Gogolak. Starting in 1985, twelve further players have worn the number for the Giants.

== See also ==
- History of the New York Giants (1925–1978)
