= 1930 New York Giants season =

NFL team season

- Head coach: LeRoy Andrews (First 15 games); Benny Friedman and Steve Owen (Final 2 games)
- Home stadium: Polo Grounds

Results
- Record: 13–4
- League place: 2nd NFL

The 1930 New York Giants season was the franchise's 6th season in the National Football League.

== Schedule ==
Game	Date	Opponent	Result	Record	Venue	Recap
1	September 17	at Newark Tornadoes	W 32–0	1–0	Newark Schools Stadium	Recap
2	September 28	at Providence Steam Roller	W 27–7	2–0	Cycledrome	Recap
3	October 5	at Green Bay Packers	L 7–14	2–1	City Stadium	Recap
4	October 12	at Chicago Bears	W 12–0	3–1	Wrigley Field	Recap
5	October 16	Chicago Cardinals	W 25–12	4–1	Polo Grounds	Recap
6	October 19	Frankford Yellow Jackets	W 53–0	5–1	Polo Grounds	Recap
7	October 26	Providence Steam Roller	W 25–0	6–1	Polo Grounds	Recap
8	October 30	Newark Tornadoes	W 34–7	7–1	Polo Grounds	Recap
9	November 2	Staten Island Stapletons	W 9–7	8–1	Polo Grounds	Recap
10	November 5	at Portsmouth Spartans	W 19–6	9–1	Universal Stadium	Recap
11	November 9	at Chicago Cardinals	W 13–7	10–1	Comiskey Park	Recap
12	November 16	Chicago Bears	L 0–12	10–2	Polo Grounds	Recap
13	November 23	Green Bay Packers	W 13–6	11–2	Polo Grounds	Recap
14	November 27	at Staten Island Stapletons	L 6–7	11–3	Thompson Stadium	Recap
15	November 30	Brooklyn Dodgers	L 6–7	11–4	Polo Grounds	Recap
16	December 6	at Frankford Yellow Jackets	W 14–6	12–4	Frankford Stadium	Recap
17	December 7	at Brooklyn Dodgers	W 13–0	13–4	Ebbets Field	Recap

== Roster ==
1930 New York Giants final roster
Backs: 18 Dale Burnett FB/LB/K; 12 Chris Cagle RB/CB; 20 Tiny Feather FB/LB; 1 Benny Friedman RB/S/K; 13 Jack Hagerty RB/CB/S; 22 Hap Moran RB/CB/K; 14 Len Sedbrook RB/CB/S; 23 Ossie Wiberg RB/CB/K	Linemen: 4 Les Caywood G/DG; 9 Rudy Comstock G/DG; 11 Butch Gibson G/DG; 3 Len Grant T/DT; 5 Dosey Howard G/DG; 6 Saul Mielziner C/G/DG; 2 Mickey Murtagh C/MG; 36 Bill Owen T/DT; 55 Steve Owen T/DT; 29 Dick Stahlman T/DT; 7 Joe Wostoupal C/MG	Ends/Receivers: 17 Red Badgro; 15 Glenn Campbell; 0 Hal Hilpirt; rookies in italics

== Standings ==
NFL standings
	W	L	T	PCT	PF	PA	STK
Green Bay Packers	10	3	1	.769	234	111	T1
New York Giants	13	4	0	.765	308	98	L1
Chicago Bears	9	4	1	.692	169	71	W5
Brooklyn Dodgers	7	4	1	.636	154	59	L1
Providence Steam Roller	6	4	1	.600	90	125	L1
Staten Island Stapletons	5	5	2	.500	95	112	L1
Chicago Cardinals	5	6	2	.455	128	132	L1
Portsmouth Spartans	5	6	3	.455	176	161	T1
Frankford Yellow Jackets	4	13	1	.235	113	321	T1
Minneapolis Red Jackets	1	7	1	.125	27	165	L6
Newark Tornadoes	1	10	1	.091	51	190	L6

Note: Tie games were not officially counted in the standings until 1972.

== See also ==
- List of New York Giants seasons
