= 1930 Chicago Bears season =

NFL team season

- Owner: George S. Halas, Dutch Sternaman
- Head coach: Ralph Jones
- Home stadium: Wrigley Field

Results
- Record: 9–4–1
- League place: 3rd NFL

The 1930 season was the Chicago Bears' 11th in the National Football League. The team was able to improve on their 4–9–2 record from 1929 and finished with a 9–4–1 record under first-year head coach Ralph Jones. Jones, a former player, led the team to recover from its ninth-place finish to a respectable third-place finish. The season started badly with a 1–2–1 record over the first four games, the only win coming against the hapless Minneapolis Redjackets. After splitting games five and six, the Bears got their winning ways back, finishing the season with 5 straight wins and 7 wins in their last 8 games. The only loss those last 8 games was to eventual champion Green Bay. The secret to the Bears' success was new talent in the backfield. All-American and rookie Bronko Nagurski starred at fullback while living legend Red Grange starred at tailback. These two future Hall of Famers combined for 13 touchdowns overall. Luke Johnsos, in his second year, also starred at the end. The makings of future championships were in place.

== Roster ==
1930 Chicago Bears final roster
Backs: 8 Carl Brumbaugh QB/S; 77 Red Grange RB/CB; 9 Walt Holmer RB/CB; 7 Joe Lintzenich RB/CB; 3 Bronko Nagurski FB/LB; 2 Dick Nesbitt RB/CB; 6 Bill Senn RB/CB; 4 Joey Sternaman QB/S/K; 5 Laurie Walquist RB/QB/CB/S	Linemen: 20 Zuck Carlson G/DG; 17 Babe Frump G/DG; 11 Link Lyman T/DT; 21 Danny McMullen G/DG; 18 Don Murry T/DT; 14 Frank Pauly T/DT; 26 Bert Pearson C/MG; 22 Paul Schuette G/DG; 28 Larry Steinbach T/DT; 13 George Trafton C/MG	Ends/Receivers: 23 Hoot Drury; 25 Gardie Grange; 24 Luke Johnsos K; Rookies in italics

== Future Hall of Fame players ==
- Red Grange, back
- Link Lyman, tackle
- Bronko Nagurski, fullback/tackle (rookie from University of Minnesota)
- George Trafton, center

== Other leading players ==
- Carl Brumbaugh, quarterback (rookie from University of Florida)
- Garland Grange, end
- Luke Johnsos, end
- William Senn, back
- Joe Sternaman, quarterback
- Laurie Walquist, quarterback

== Players departed from 1929 ==
- Paddy Driscoll, back (retired)
- George Halas, end (retired)
- Joe Kopcha, guard (temporarily left team)

== Schedule ==
Date	Opponent	Result	Record	Venue	Attendance
September 21	Brooklyn Dodgers	T 0–0	0–0–1	Mills Stadium	10,000
September 28	at Green Bay Packers	L 0–7	0–1–1	City Stadium	10,000
October 2	at Milwaukee Nighthawks*	W 26–0	Exhibition	Borchert Field	3,000
October 5	at Minneapolis Red Jackets	W 20–0	1–1–1	Nicollet Park	7,000
October 12	New York Giants	L 0–12	1–2–1	Wrigley Field	12,000
October 19	at Chicago Cardinals	W 32–6	2–2–1	Comiskey Park	7,000
October 22	at Portsmouth Spartans	L 6–7	2–3–1	Universal Stadium	7,500
October 26	Frankford Yellow Jackets	W 13–7	3–3–1	Wrigley Field	5,000
November 2	Minneapolis Red Jackets	W 20–7	4–3–1	Wrigley Field	4,000
November 9	Green Bay Packers	L 12–13	4–4–1	Wrigley Field	22,000
November 16	at New York Giants	W 12–0	5–4–1	Polo Grounds	5,000
November 22	at Frankford Yellow Jackets	W 13–6	6–4–1	Frankford Stadium	6,500
November 23	Ironton Tanks*	L 13–26	Exhibition	Crosley Field‡	6,000
November 27	Chicago Cardinals	W 6–0	7–4–1	Wrigley Field	8,175
November 30	Portsmouth Spartans	W 14–6	8–4–1	Wrigley Field	6,000
December 7	Green Bay Packers	W 21–0	9–4–1	Wrigley Field	22,000
December 15	Chicago Cardinals	W 9–7	Exhibition	Chicago Stadium (indoor)‡	10,000
^{*} Non-NFL team ^{‡} Neutral site game

== Standings ==
NFL standings
	W	L	T	PCT	PF	PA	STK
Green Bay Packers	10	3	1	.769	234	111	T1
New York Giants	13	4	0	.765	308	98	L1
Chicago Bears	9	4	1	.692	169	71	W5
Brooklyn Dodgers	7	4	1	.636	154	59	L1
Providence Steam Roller	6	4	1	.600	90	125	L1
Staten Island Stapletons	5	5	2	.500	95	112	L1
Chicago Cardinals	5	6	2	.455	128	132	L1
Portsmouth Spartans	5	6	3	.455	176	161	T1
Frankford Yellow Jackets	4	13	1	.235	113	321	T1
Minneapolis Red Jackets	1	7	1	.125	27	165	L6
Newark Tornadoes	1	10	1	.091	51	190	L6

Note: Tie games were not officially counted in the standings until 1972.
