= Fred Brown (American football guard) =

American football player (1905–1979)

No. 11
- Position: Guard

Personal information
- Born: August 29, 1905; Dedham, Massachusetts, U.S.
- Died: February 28, 1979 (aged 73); Bradenton, Florida, U.S.
- Listed height: 6 ft 2 in (1.88 m)
- Listed weight: 195 lb (88 kg)

Career information
- High school: Dedham (MA)
- College: NYU

Career history
- Staten Island Stapletons (1930)

William Frederick Brown (August 29, 1905 – February 28, 1979) was an American football player.

Brown was born in 1905 in Dedham, Massachusetts. He played for the 1929 NYU Violets football team that defeated Penn State, Georgia, and Missouri, compiling a 7–3 under head coach Chick Meehan.

Brown played professional football in the National Football League (NFL) as a guard for the Staten Island Stapletons during the 1930 season. He appeared in seven NFL games, one as a starter.

After his football career ended, Brown lived in Austin, Texas, and worked as an officer with the Texas State Liquor Authority. After retiring, he moved to Bradenton, Florida. He died in February 1979 at Blake Memorial Hospital in Bradentown.
