= Bing Miller (American football) =

American football player (1903–1964)

Profile
- Position: Tackle

Personal information
- Born: December 6, 1903; Syracuse, New York, U.S.
- Died: October 12, 1964 (aged 60); New York, New York, U.S.
- Listed height: 6 ft 1 in (1.85 m)
- Listed weight: 188 lb (85 kg)

Career information
- High school: Blodgett Vocational (NY)
- College: NYU

Career history

Playing
- Staten Island Stapletons (1929-1931)

Coaching
- Manhattan College (1932–1936) Line coach; Hobart College (1937–1938) Line coach; LIU (1939–1940) Line coach

Operations
- NYU (1948–1964) Graduate/general manager of athletics

John Edward "Bing" Miller (December 6, 1903 – October 12, 1964) was an American football player and coach and athletics administrator. He played tackle for the NYU Violes from 1924 to 1927 and for the Staten Island Stapletons from 1929 to 1931. He was later the line coach at Manhattan College (1932–1936), Hobart College (1937–1938), and Long Island University (1939–1940). He was the general manager of athletics at NYU from 1948 until his death in 1964.

== Early life ==
Miller was born in Syracuse, New York, in 1903. He attended Blodgett Vocational School in Syracuse and the Dean Academy in Franklin, Massachusetts. He then enrolled at New York University where he played college football for NYU Violets from 1924 to 1927. He was teammates with Pro Football Hall of Fame inductee Ken Strong at NYU; Strong called Miller "the greatest tackle I ever saw."

== Professional football ==
Miller also played professional football in the National Football League (NFL) as a tackle for the Staten Island Stapletons during the 1929, 1930 and 1931 seasons. He appeared in 29 NFL games, 26 as a starter.

== Later life ==
After his playing career ended, Miller served as a line coach at Manhattan College (1932–1936), Hobart College (1937–1938), and Long Island University (1939–1940).

Miller and his wife, Jane, had a son John Jay Miller. He later served as general manager of athletics at NYU from 1948 until his death in 1964. He died at Kingsbridge Veterans Hospital in The Bronx in 1964 at age 60.
