= 1930 Providence Steam Roller season =

National Football League team season

- Head coach: Jimmy Conzelman

Results
- Record: 6–4–1
- League place: 5th in NFL

The 1930 Providence Steam Roller season was their sixth in the league. The team improved on their previous season's output of 4–6–2, winning six games. They finished fifth in the league.

== Schedule ==
Game	Date	Opponent	Result	Record
1	September 28	New York Giants	L 7–27	0–1
2	October 1	Frankford Yellow Jackets	W 14–0	1–1
3	October 5	Newark Tornadoes	W 14–0	2–1
4	October 12	Chicago Cardinals	W 9–7	3–1
5	October 19	Staten Island Stapletons	W 7–6	4–1
6	October 26	at New York Giants	L 0–25	4–2
7	November 2	Brooklyn Dodgers	W 3–0	5–2
8	November 8	at Frankford Yellow Jackets	L 7–20	5–3
9	November 9	Frankford Yellow Jackets	T 7–7	5–3–1
10	November 23	Minneapolis Red Jackets	W 10–0	6–3–1
11	November 27	at Brooklyn Dodgers	L 12–33	6–4–1

== Roster ==
1930 Providence Steam Roller final roster
Backs: 5 Jack Cronin RB/CB/S; 6 Bud Edwards RB/CB; 8 Al Hadden RB/CB; 7 Tony Latone FB/LB; 3 Butch Meeker RB/CB/S/K; 2 Curly Oden RB/CB/S; 1 Frosty Peters RB/CB/S/K; 4 Pop Williams RB/CB/S	Linemen: 14 Herb Eschbach C/MG; 23 Al Graham G/DG; 13 Perry Jackson T/DT; 15 Joe Kozlowsky T/DT; 16 Warren McGuirk T/DT; 12 Frank Racis G/DG; 18 Milt Rehnquist G/DG; 11 Ray Smith C/MG	Ends/Receivers: 22 Ted Kucharski; 17 Al Rose; 10 Jack Spellman; Rookies in italics

== Standings ==
NFL standings
	W	L	T	PCT	PF	PA	STK
Green Bay Packers	10	3	1	.769	234	111	T1
New York Giants	13	4	0	.765	308	98	L1
Chicago Bears	9	4	1	.692	169	71	W5
Brooklyn Dodgers	7	4	1	.636	154	59	L1
Providence Steam Roller	6	4	1	.600	90	125	L1
Staten Island Stapletons	5	5	2	.500	95	112	L1
Chicago Cardinals	5	6	2	.455	128	132	L1
Portsmouth Spartans	5	6	3	.455	176	161	T1
Frankford Yellow Jackets	4	13	1	.235	113	321	T1
Minneapolis Red Jackets	1	7	1	.125	27	165	L6
Newark Tornadoes	1	10	1	.091	51	190	L6

Note: Tie games were not officially counted in the standings until 1972.
