= Jack Shapiro =

American football player (1907–2001)

Profile
- Position: Back

Personal information
- Born: March 22, 1907; New York City, New York, U.S.
- Died: February 5, 2001 (aged 93); Carrollton, Georgia, U.S.
- Listed height: 5 ft 1 in (1.55 m)
- Listed weight: 119 lb (54 kg)

Career information
- College: New York University

Career history
- Staten Island Stapletons (1929)
- Stats at Pro Football Reference

Jack Emanuel "Soupy" Shapiro (March 22, 1907 – February 5, 2001) was an American gridiron football player who played in one game with the Staten Island Stapletons of the National Football League (NFL) in 1929. Shapiro is most famous for being the shortest player in NFL history at about 5 ft 1 in (1.55 m).

== Early life ==
In 1907, Shapiro was born in New York City, New York, United States, North America. His parents had immigrated to the United States with their previous four boys and three girls, as well as their niece. Jack was the only one of his family to be born in America. His father and two of his brothers did odd jobs for a living, resulting in earnings of $9.00 a week.

Shapiro attended Evander Child High School in the Bronx. While in high school, he was a starter on the football team for three straight years. During the last game in his senior year, however, he was injured and was forced out of the game. His playing weight in high school was 85 pounds (39 kg).

== College career ==
Prior to joining the Stapletons, Shapiro played college football, while attending New York University. He played fullback for the Violets in 1927 when the team posted a 7-1-2 record while outscoring their opponents by 345-65. He joined the NYU team his freshman year as a "walk on". By his sophomore year, he was given a full scholarship and was awarded a varsity letterman that season.

Afterwards, Shapiro moonlighted as a professional football player for a team in Meriden, Connecticut. The team was sponsored by the Sons of Italy.

== NFL ==
In 1929, Shapiro played in one NFL game with Staten Island. As the shortest player in the history of the NFL, Shapiro played as a blocking back in the Stapletons' 34-0 victory over the Minneapolis Red Jackets. Shapiro later stated that he was, in fact, on the Stapletons roster for five games, playing in two regular-season games and one exhibition game. The regular-season games were late in the season against the Minneapolis Red Jackets and Orange Tornadoes.

== Recognition ==
In 1999, Shapiro received recognition in the Guinness Book of Records as being the shortest player on record in NFL history.

== Bibliography ==
- Jews in Sports profile
- Bashore, Mel (1999). ""Cup of Coffee" Players: Jack Shapiro" (PDF). Coffin Corner. 21 (4). Professional Football Researchers Association: 1–2.
- Jack Shapiro's obituary
