= Jim Fitzgerald (American football) =

American football player (1907–1978)

Profile
- Position: Center

Personal information
- Born: March 7, 1907; Wakefield, Massachusetts
- Died: September 23, 1978 (aged 71); Boston
- Listed height: 5 ft 11 in (1.80 m)
- Listed weight: 215 lb (98 kg)

Career information
- High school: Westbrook Seminary (ME)
- College: Holy Cross

Career history
- Staten Island Stapletons (1930–1931)

James Patrick Fitzgerald (March 7, 1907 – September 23, 1978) was an American football player.

Fitzgerald was born in 1907 in Waltham, Massachusetts. He attended Westbrook Seminary in Westbrook, Maine. He also attended the College of the Holy Cross, where he played college football in 1928.

Fitzgerald also played professional football in the National Football League (NFL) as a center for the Staten Island Stapletons during the 1930 and 1931 seasons. He appeared in 21 NFL games, 14 as a starter.

Fitzgerald died in 1978 in Boston.

The James Fitzgerald Elementary school in Waltham, Massachusetts was named after him.
