= Beryl Follet =

American football player (1908–1982)

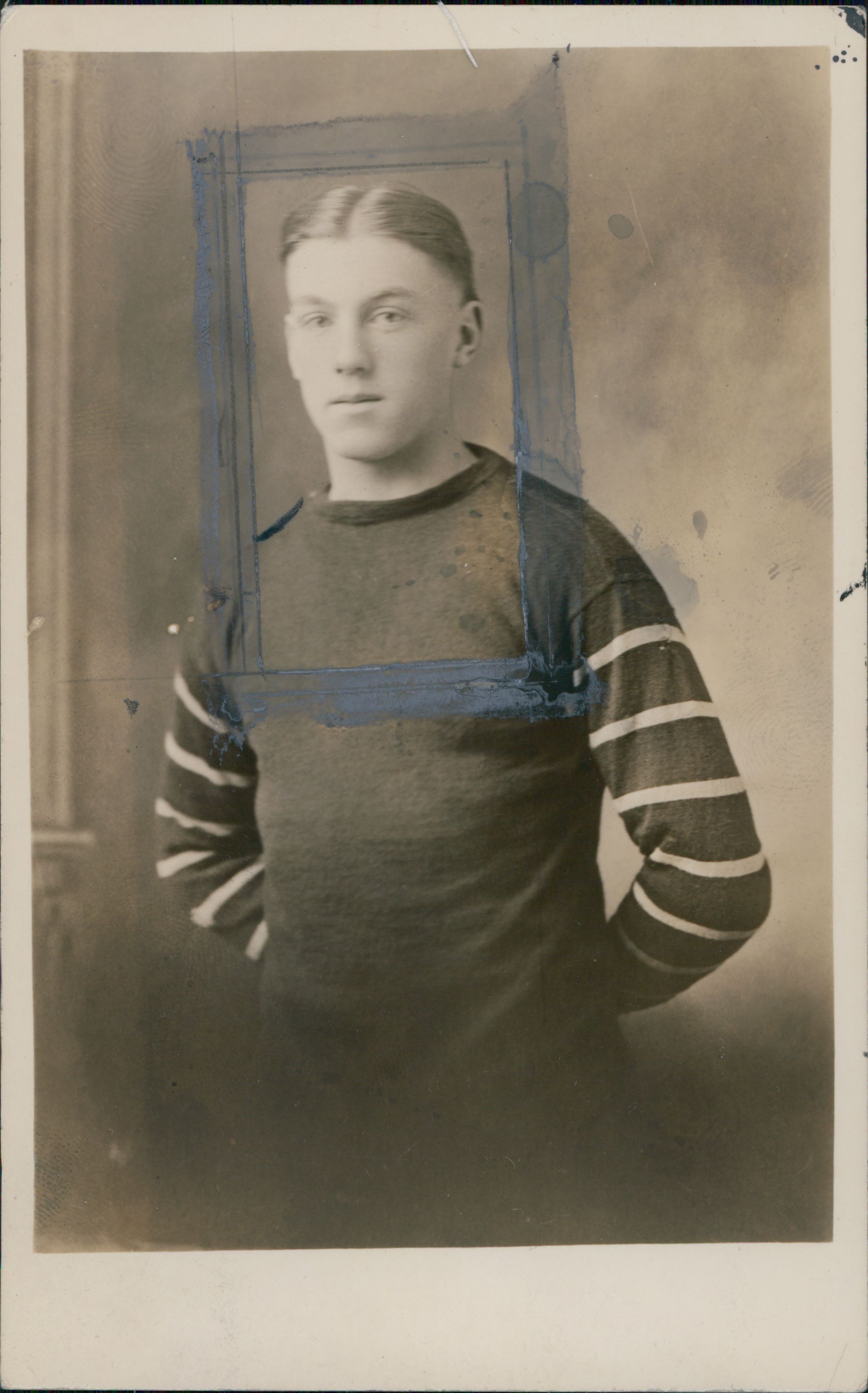
- Follet in 1923

Profile
- Positions: Halfback, fullback, quarterback

Personal information
- Born: April 26, 1908; Manlius, Illinois, U.S.
- Died: May 1, 1982 (aged 74); Stony Brook, New York, U.S.
- Listed height: 5 ft 9 in (1.75 m)
- Listed weight: 165 lb (75 kg)

Career information
- High school: Worcester Academy (MA)
- College: NYU

Career history
- Staten Island Stapletons (1930-1931)

Beryl Millard Follet (April 26, 1908 – May 1, 1982) was an American football player who played at the halfback, fullback and quarterback positions.

Follet was born in 1908 in Manlius, Illinois. He attended Worcester Academy in Worcester, Massachusetts. He played college football for the NYU Violets from 1927 to 1929. On October 13, 1928, he returned a kickoff 96 yards for a touchdown against Fordham. He also had scored five touchdowns and kicked four extra points against Vermont on September 28, 1929, ran 75 yards for a touchdown against Butler on October 26, 1929, ran 70 yards for a touchdown against Missouri on November 16, 1929, and scored three touchdowns, including a 70-yard run, against Rutgers on November 23, 1929. He also played for the NYU baseball team as a pitcher.

He played professional football in the National Football League (NFL) as a halfback for the Staten Island Stapletons during the 1930 and 1931 seasons. He appeared in 12 NFL games, nine as a starter. He also played in the Eastern Football League for the Mount Vernon Indians in 1932 and in the Interstate Football League for the Bayonne Vikings in 1933.

During World War II, Follet served as director of physical training for the V-12 program at Northwestern University. He later served as the backfield coach for the Coast Guard Academy football team.

Follet died on May 1, 1982 at Stony Brook, New York.
