= John Demmy =

American football player (1904–1970)

Profile
- Position: Tackle

Personal information
- Born: March 5, 1904; Bayonne, New Jersey
- Died: March 1, 1970 (aged 65); Bay Head, New Jersey
- Listed weight: 190 lb (86 kg)

Career information
- High school: Bayonne (NJ)

Career history
- Staten Island Stapletons (1930-1931)
- Stats at Pro Football Reference

John Demmy (March 5, 1904 – March 1970), born Demyanovich, was an American football player.

Demmy was born in 1904 in Bayonne, New Jersey. He played professional football in the National Football League (NFL) as a tackle for the Staten Island Stapletons during the 1930 and 1931 seasons. He appeared in nine NFL games, three as a starter. He also played for the Paterson Night Hawks of the Eastern Football League in 1932.

Demmy's younger brother, Joe Demyanovich, played college football for Alabama from 1931 to 1934. Another brother, George Demmy, also played football.

Demmy died in 1970 in either Point Pleasant Beach or Bay Head, New Jersey (sources differ).
