= Bob Campiglio =

American football player (1908–1995)

Profile
- Position: Running back

Personal information
- Born: May 17, 1908; Milton, Pennsylvania
- Died: October 22, 1995 (aged 87); Boca Raton, Florida

Career information
- College: West Liberty

Career history
- 1932: Staten Island Stapletons
- 1933: Boston Redskins
- Stats at Pro Football Reference

Robert Fulton "Bob" Campiglio (May 17, 1908 – October 22, 1995) was an American football halfback.

== Biography ==
Campiglio was born in 1908 in Milton, Pennsylvania, and attended Milton High School. He played college football as a fullback for West Liberty Teachers College from 1929 to 1931. He led all college football players in 1931 with 146 points, including 68 points (10 touchdowns and six extra points) in a game against Bethel of Kentucky. While attending West Liberty, he was captain of the football, baseball, and basketball teams.

Campiglio also played professional football in the National Football League for the Staten Island Stapletons in 1932 and Boston Redskins in 1933. He appeared in 17 NFL games, six of them as a starter.

During the 1932 NFL season, Campiglio rushed for 504 yards, passed for 109 yards, caught three passes for 59 yards, and scored three touchdowns. He scored two touchdowns in a November 20, 1932, victory over the Chicago Cardinals.

Campiglio died in 1995 at Boca Raton, Florida.

== See also ==
- List of NCAA major college football yearly scoring leaders
