= Harry Kloppenburg =

American football player and coach (1908–1950)

- Harry Kloppenburg, 1929

Profile
- Positions: End, guard

Personal information
- Born: August 30, 1908; New York, New York, U.S.
- Died: January 1, 1950 (aged 41); New York, New York, U.S.
- Listed height: 6 ft 1 in (1.85 m)
- Listed weight: 210 lb (95 kg)

Career information
- High school: Xavier (NY)
- College: Fordham

Career history
- Staten Island Stapletons (1930); Brooklyn Dodgers (1932, 1933-1934)

Harry J. Kloppenburg (August 30, 1908 – January 1, 1950) was an American football player and coach.

Kloppenburg was born in 1908 in New York City. He attended Xavier High School in Manhattan. He then played college football as an offensive end for Fordham from 1926 to 1929. While playing for Fordham, he was one of the famed Seven Blocks of Granite.

He played college football for Fordham and in the National Football League (NFL) as an end and guard for the Staten Island Stapletons (1930) and Brooklyn Dodgers (1931, 1933–1934). He appeared in 19 NFL games, five as a starter.

Kloppenburg later worked as the press box announcer for Fordham games and had a law practice in Flushing, New York. He also coached the Great Lakes Naval Training Station football team in the fall of 1946. He died suddenly on January 1, 1950, at age 41.
