= Joe Lintzenich =

American football player (1908–1985)

Profile
- Position: Halfback

Personal information
- Born: March 26, 1908; Webster Groves, Missouri, U.S.
- Died: June 23, 1985 (aged 77); Creve Coeur, Missouri, U.S.

Career information
- College: St. Louis University

Career history
- 1930–1931: Chicago Bears
- 1932: St. Louis Veterans (asst.coach)
- 1932: St. Louis Gunners

Joseph Francis Lintzenich (March 26, 1908 – June 23, 1985) was an American professional football player for the Chicago Bears of the National Football League (NFL). He also played for the St. Louis Gunners in 1932, prior to the club's entry into the NFL. Prior to that he was an assistant coach, under Garland Grange, for the St. Louis Veterans.

Lintzenich played college football for Saint Louis University. He was inducted into the school's athletic hall of fame in 1976.

Lintzenich was the father-in-law of broadcaster Jack Buck and grandfather and namesake to Fox Sports broadcaster Joe Buck.
