= Dan Blaine =

American football player (1891–1958)

Profile
- Position: Halfback

Personal information
- Born: 1891; Stapleton, Staten Island, New York, United States
- Died: 1958 (aged 66–67)

Career information
- College: None

Career history

Playing
- 1915–1924: Staten Island Stapletons

owner
- 1919–1934: Staten Island Stapletons

Other information
- Military career
- Allegiance: United States
- Branch: U.S. Army
- Service years: 1918-1919
- Conflicts: World War I

Daniel Blaine (1891–1958) was a professional football player for the Staten Island Stapletons from 1915 until 1924. In 1915 he, along with three other players, formed the team to play other semi-pro teams from New York and New Jersey. He suspended his football career in 1918 to serve in the United States military during World War I. Once the war ended, Blaine took over sole ownership of the Stapletons. He stayed in the Stapleton lineup at halfback until ending his playing career in 1924 at age 33. After his retirement from football, Blaine focused solely on owning and managing the team.

After a November 14, 1926 33–0 loss to the Newark Bears, Blaine promptly hired most of the Newark players, including star rookie Doug Wycoff, who were still owed money by the Bears due to the team's financial problems. As a result, the Bears went out of business, while the Stapletons benefited from Newark's folding. In 1929, the Stapletons became members of the National Football League after the New York Yankees folded. This resulted in a rivalry between the Stapletons and the New York Giants. While the Stapletons never had a winning season in the NFL, they did manage to defeat, or tie some of the teams that are still in existence today.

A combination of the Great Depression and having too small of a stadium that could have never accommodated enough fans to make the team profitable caused great financial difficulties for the team. Many of the Stapletons' fans couldn't afford tickets to make a team possible. Blaine went through the formality of getting NFL permission to suspend league operations for the 1934 season. The team played one more season of semi-pro football in 1934 before quietly folding. In June 1935, Blaine's franchise was finally declared forfeit.

== Restaurants ==
Blaine also owned several restaurants on Staten Island. However, it is rumored that some, if not all, of these restaurants were really speakeasies, that illegally served alcohol during the period of United States history known as Prohibition in the United States. One of Blaine's restaurants was located next to the Stapletons' home field, Thompson Stadium.
