= Ray Novotny =

American football player and coach (1907–1995)

Raymond John Novotny
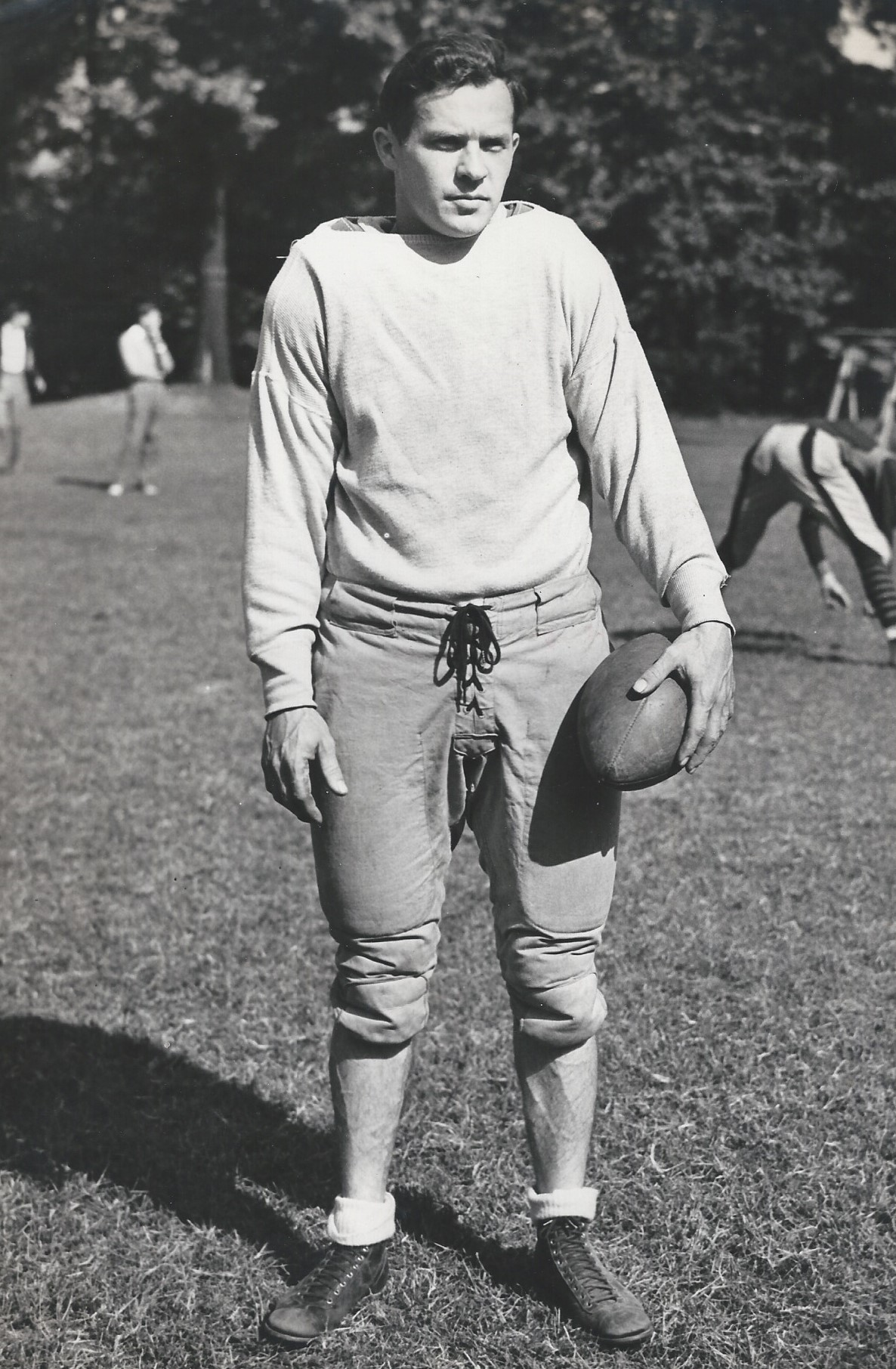
- Novotny at Kent State, 1937

Profile
- Positions: Fullback, halfback, quarterback

Personal information
- Born: October 12, 1907; Cleveland, Ohio, U.S.
- Died: May 30, 1995 (aged 87)
- Listed height: 5 ft 10 in (1.78 m)
- Listed weight: 165 lb (75 kg)

Career information
- High school: West Tech (Cleveland, Ohio)
- College: Ashland

Career history

Playing
- Portsmouth Spartans (1930); Cleveland Indians (1931); Brooklyn Dodgers (1932)

Coaching
- Ashland (1934)

Raymond John Novotny Sr. (October 12, 1907 – May 30, 1995) was an American football player and coach. He played professionally with the Portsmouth Spartans, Cleveland Indians and Brooklyn Dodgers of the National Football League (NFL). Prior to playing in the NFL, Novotny played college football at Ashland University. While at Ashland, he earned All-American honors in 1929. In 1934, he returned to Ashland to serve as the school's football coach. He also served as the baseball coach for the 1935 season.

His grandson is Maryland politician Reid Novotny.

== Early life ==
Novotny was born on October 12, 1907, in Cleveland to John Novotny and Caroline Hudec of Czech ancestry.
