= St. Louis Veterans =

Former independent football team from St. Louis, MO

- Founded: 1932
- Folded: 1932
- Based in: St. Louis, Missouri, United States
- League: Independent (1932)
- Team history: St. Louis Veterans (1932)
- Team colors: Unknown
- Head coaches: Garland Grange (1932)
- General managers: Bud Yates (1932)
- Home field(s): Public Schools Stadium

The St. Louis Veterans were a professional American football team based in St. Louis, Missouri in 1932. The team was founded by Bud Yates, the general manager of the St. Louis Gunners, who would play in the National Football League in 1934. In 1932, Yates figured that since one professional football team could make a good showing in St. Louis, he would add another. The team was sponsored by a group representing disabled American veterans from World War I. Garland Grange, the younger brother of Red Grange was named the team's head coach. Meanwhile, Joe Lintzenich, a teammate of Garland's from the Chicago Bears, was hired as his assistant. Yates then signed several players from the Gunners, the Portsmouth Spartans and Memphis Tigers to his roster.

The Veterans folded after playing in only 5 games and posting a 2–2–1 record. Yates returned to the St. Louis Gunners, while Garland Grange headed to coach the Memphis Tigers.
