= Charlie Gainor =

American football player (1916–1996)

No. 18
- Position: Defensive end

Personal information
- Born: November 22, 1916; Sargent Township, North Dakota, U.S.
- Died: September 10, 1996 (aged 79); Fort Dodge, Iowa, U.S.
- Listed height: 6 ft 3 in (1.91 m)
- Listed weight: 190 lb (86 kg)

Career information
- College: North Dakota
- NFL draft: 1939: 18th round, 164th overall pick

Career history
- Chicago Cardinals (1939); St. Louis Gunners (1939); Wilmington Clippers (1939)

Career NFL statistics
- Games played: 1
- Games started: 0
- Stats at Pro Football Reference

Charles Edward Gainor (November 22, 1916 – September 10, 1996) was an American professional football player who was a defensive end for the Chicago Cardinals of the National Football League (NFL) for one season in 1939. He also played for the St. Louis Gunners of the American Football League (AFL) and the Wilmington Clippers of the American Association (AA). He played college football for the North Dakota Fighting Hawks and he was selected by the Philadelphia Eagles in the eighteenth round of the 1939 NFL draft. Gainor was inducted into the University of North Dakota Athletics Hall of Fame in 1978.
