= Ralph Buckley =

American football player (1907–1979)

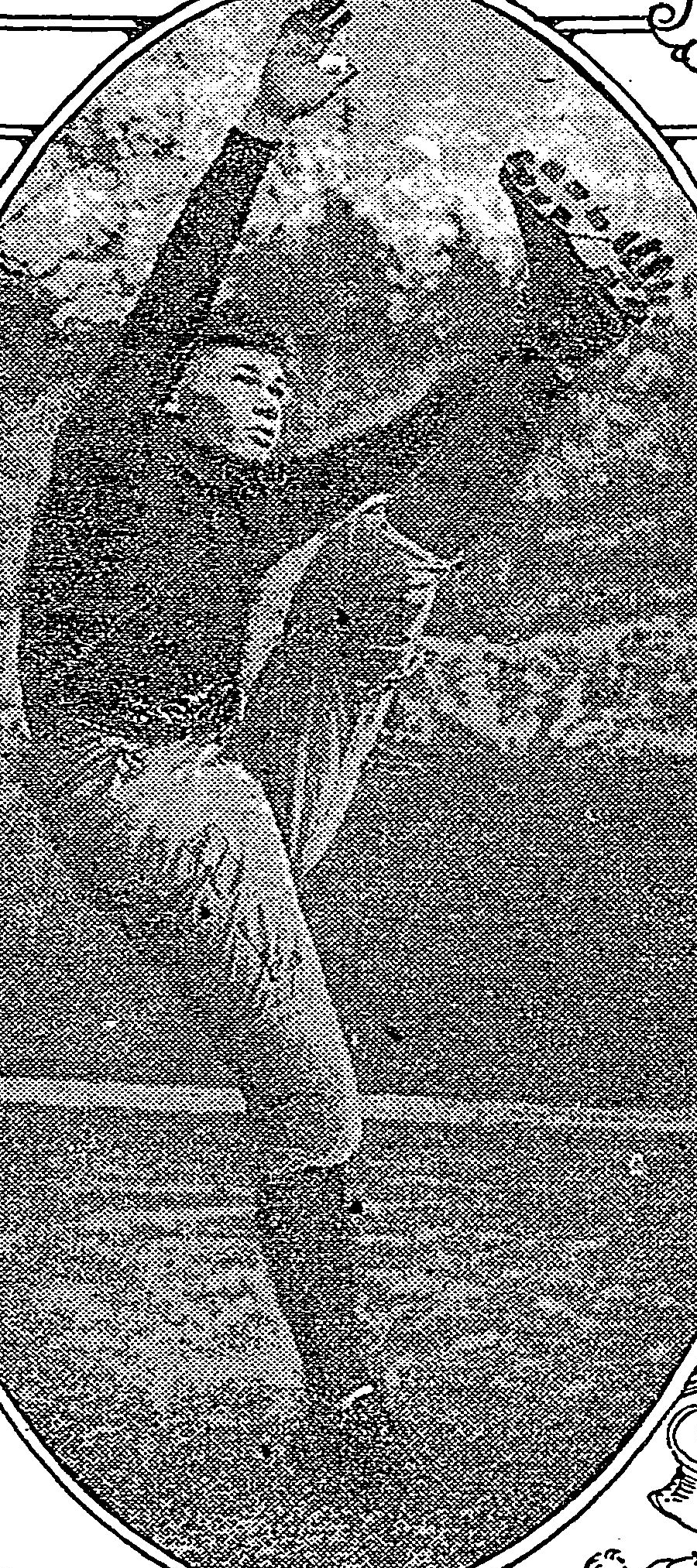
- Buckley in 1925

Profile
- Position: Halfback

Personal information
- Born: March 18, 1907; Meriden, Connecticut
- Died: July 13, 1979 (aged 72); Dunedin, Florida
- Listed height: 5 ft 8 in (1.73 m)
- Listed weight: 175 lb (79 kg)

Career information
- High school: Washington (CT)
- College: Fordham

Career history
- New Britain (1928); Insilco (1929); South Ends (1930); Staten Island Stapletons (1930)

Ralph Joseph Buckley (March 18, 1907 – July 13, 1979) was an American football player.

Buckley was born in 1907 in Meriden, Connecticut, and attended Meriden High School. He was selected at quarterback on the Connecticut all-state football team in 1923.

He played college football for Fordham from 1924 to 1927. In his first game in a college uniform, he ran 45 yards for a touchdown.

He played professional baseball for the Springfield Ponies in the summer of 1928, pro football for New Britain in fall of 1928, and semi-pro football for Insilco in 1929 and the South Ends in 1930. He played professional football in the National Football League (NFL) as a halfback for the Staten Island Stapletons during the 1930 season. He appeared in seven NFL games, five as a starter.

After his football career ended, Buckley was a police officer in Connecticut, attaining the rank of captain. He also served in the U.S. Army, attaining the rank of colonel. He moved to Florida in approximately 1974 and died in 1978 at Dunedin, Florida.
