= Herb Rapp =

American football player (1905–1983)

Profile
- Position: Center

Personal information
- Born: July 21, 1905; Hamilton, Ohio
- Died: July 21, 1983 (aged 78); Los Altos Hills, California
- Listed height: 6 ft 0 in (1.83 m)
- Listed weight: 195 lb (88 kg)

Career information
- High school: Hamilton (OH)
- College: Xavier

Career history
- Staten Island Stapletons (1930–1931)

Herbert "Hub" Leo Rapp (July 21, 1905 – July 21, 1983) was an American football player.

Rapp played college football for St. Xavier (now known as Xavier University). He was captain and starting center for the 1926 St. Xavier Musketeers football team that compiled a 9–1 record. He received more All-America and all-conference honors than any player from southern Ohio. He won a reputation as "one of the greatest college players to ever don the moleskins in this section of the country." In 1929, he played for the Ashland Armcos football team.

Rapp also played professional football in the National Football League (NFL) as a center for the Staten Island Stapletons (1930-1931). He appeared in 19 NFL games, nine as a starter. In September 1930, Red Roberts rated Rapp as the greatest all-around linemen in professional football at that time. Roberts said of Rapp: "He can do anything any other center man can do, and the majority of it a trifle better."
