= Frank Pauly =

American football player (1904–1968)

Frank George Pauly
Profile
- Position: Tackle

Personal information
- Born: January 24, 1904; Hancock County, Ohio, U.S.
- Died: June 10, 1968 (aged 64); Toledo, Ohio, U.S.
- Listed height: 6 ft 1 in (1.85 m)
- Listed weight: 270 lb (122 kg)

Career information
- College: Washington & Jefferson

Career history
- Chicago Bears (1930)
- Stats at Pro Football Reference

Frank George Pauly (January 24, 1904 – June 10, 1968) was an American professional football player for the Chicago Bears.

He attended high school at Waite High School in Toledo, Ohio. He attended Washington & Jefferson College. At one time, Washington & Jefferson proclaimed him to be the largest college football player, weighing in at 303 pounds; however that weight was taken at halftime of a particularly muddy game and Pauly's weight was inflated by over 40 pounds. His actual weight at the time was 256 pounds.

Following his professional career, he coached high school football at his alma mater, Waite High School. He also worked as attendance officer for the board of education.
