= 1930 Frankford Yellow Jackets season =

National Football League team season

- Head coach: Bull Behman and George Gibson
- Home stadium: Frankford Stadium

Results
- Record: 6–13–1 Overall; 4–13–1 NFL
- League place: 9th NFL

The 1930 Frankford Yellow Jackets season was their seventh in the National Football League. The team failed to improve on their previous league record of 9–4–5, winning only four league games. They lost all eight games they played in October and finished ninth in the league standings.

== Roster ==
- Nate Barragar
- Bull Behman
- Eddie Bollinger
- Tom Capps
- Clyde Crabtree
- Wally Diehl
- Jack Ernst
- George Gibson
- Royce Goodbread
- Eddie Halicki
- Hal Hanson
- Charlie Havens
- Henry Homan
- Jack Hutton
- Herb Joesting
- Tom Jones
- Tony Kostos
- Harvey Long
- Jerry Lunz
- Roger Mahoney
- Jack McArthur
- Mally Nydahl
- Tony Panaccion
- Jim Pederson
- Art Pharmer
- Neil Rengel
- Ray Richards
- Kelly Rodriguez
- Herman Seborg
- Johnny Shultz
- Gene Smith
- Tony Steponovich
- Cookie Tackwell
- Bob Tanner
- Clyde Van Sickle
- Johnny Ward
- Gordon Watkins
- Lee Wilson
- Ab Wright

== Schedule ==
Week	Date	Opponent	Result
–	September 21	at Clifton Heights Orange & Black	W 33–6
1	September 23	at Newark Tornadoes	W 13–6
2	September 27	Staten Island Stapletons	W 7–3
3	September 28	at Staten Island Stapletons	L 0–21
4	October 1	at Providence Steam Roller	L 0–14
5	October 4	Newark Tornadoes	L 0–19
6	October 8	at Portsmouth Spartans	L 7–39
7	October 12	at Green Bay Packers	L 12–27
8	October 18	Brooklyn Dodgers	L 7–14
9	October 19	at New York Giants	L 0–53
10	October 25	Chicago Cardinals	L 7–34
11	October 26	at Chicago Bears	L 7–13
12	November 2	at Chicago Cardinals	L 0–6
13	November 8	Providence Steam Roller	W 20–7
14	November 9	at Providence Steam Roller	T 7–7
15	November 15	Portsmouth Spartans	W 7–6
16	November 22	Chicago Bears	L 6–13
17	November 27	Green Bay Packers	L 7–25
–	November 30	at Clifton Heights Orange & Black	W 19–0
18	December 6	New York Giants	L 6–14
Note: Non-NFL opponents are in italics.

== Standings ==
NFL standings
	W	L	T	PCT	PF	PA	STK
Green Bay Packers	10	3	1	.769	234	111	T1
New York Giants	13	4	0	.765	308	98	L1
Chicago Bears	9	4	1	.692	169	71	W5
Brooklyn Dodgers	7	4	1	.636	154	59	L1
Providence Steam Roller	6	4	1	.600	90	125	L1
Staten Island Stapletons	5	5	2	.500	95	112	L1
Chicago Cardinals	5	6	2	.455	128	132	L1
Portsmouth Spartans	5	6	3	.455	176	161	T1
Frankford Yellow Jackets	4	13	1	.235	113	321	T1
Minneapolis Red Jackets	1	7	1	.125	27	165	L6
Newark Tornadoes	1	10	1	.091	51	190	L6

Note: Tie games were not officially counted in the standings until 1972.
