= Ebby DeWeese =

American football player (1904–1942)

No. 8, 14, 52
- Position: Guard

Personal information
- Born: September 7, 1904; Miamisburg, Ohio, U.S.
- Died: July 18, 1942 (aged 37); West Carrollton, Ohio, U.S.
- Listed height: 6 ft 0 in (1.83 m)
- Listed weight: 188 lb (85 kg)

Career information
- College: none

Career history
- Dayton Triangles (1927–1928); Portsmouth Spartans (1930)
- Stats at Pro Football Reference

William Everett "Ebby" DeWeese (September 7, 1904 – July 18, 1942) was an American professional football player who played three seasons in the National Football League (NFL) with the Dayton Triangles and Portsmouth Spartans.

== Early life ==
William Everett DeWeese was born on September 7, 1904, in Miamisburg, Ohio. He did not play college football.

== Professional career ==
DeWeese signed with the Dayton Triangles of the National Football League (NFL) in 1927. He played in six games, starting four, for the Triangles during the 1927 season and wore jersey number 8. He was listed as a guard that year. The Triangles finished the 1927 season with a 1–6–1 record. DeWeese appeared in one game as a halfback for the team in 1928, wearing No. 14. He became a free agent after the season.

DeWeese played in 11 games, starting four, for the Portsmouth Spartans during the team's inaugural season in 1930. The Spartans finished the season with a 5–6–3 record. He was listed as a guard and end while with the Spartans and wore No. 52.

== Personal life ==
DeWeese died on July 18, 1942, in West Carrollton, Ohio at the age of 37. He is buried in Hill Grove Cemetery in Montgomery County, Ohio.
