= 1930 Chicago Cardinals season =

American football team season

- Head coach: Ernie Nevers
- Home stadium: Comiskey Park

Results
- Record: 5–6–2
- League place: 7th NFL

The 1930 Chicago Cardinals season was their 11th in the league. The team failed to improve on their previous output of 6–6–1, winning only five games. They finished seventh in the league. The team played its first six games on the road and played seven games in the month of October.

== Schedule ==
| Week | Date | Opponent | Result | Record | Venue |
|---|---|---|---|---|---|
| 1 | September 21 | at Green Bay Packers | L 0–14 | 0–1 | City Stadium |
| 2 | September 28 | at Minneapolis Red Jackets | T 7–7 | 0–1–1 | Nicollet Park |
| 3 | October 5 | at Portsmouth Spartans | T 0–0 | 0–1–2 | Universal Stadium |
| 4 | October 8 | at Newark Tornadoes | W 13–0 | 1–1–2 | Newark Schools Stadium |
| 5 | October 12 | at Providence Steam Roller | L 7–9 | 1–2–2 | Cycledrome |
| 6 | October 16 | at New York Giants | L 12–25 | 1–3–2 | Polo Grounds |
| 7 | October 19 | Chicago Bears | L 6–32 | 1–4–2 | Comiskey Park |
| 8 | October 25 | at Frankford Yellow Jackets | W 34–7 | 2–4–2 | Frankford Stadium |
| 9 | October 26 | Portsmouth Spartans | W 23–13 | 3–4–2 | Comiskey Park |
| 10 | November 2 | Frankford Yellow Jackets | W 6–0 | 4–4–2 | Comiskey Park |
| 11 | November 9 | New York Giants | L 7–13 | 4–5–2 | Comiskey Park |
| 12 | November 16 | Green Bay Packers | W 13–6 | 5–5–2 | Comiskey Park |
| 13 | November 27 | at Chicago Bears | L 0–6 | 5–6–2 | Wrigley Field |

== Standings ==
NFL standings
| | W | L | T | PCT | PF | PA | STK |
|---|---|---|---|---|---|---|---|
| Green Bay Packers | 10 | 3 | 1 | .769 | 234 | 111 | T1 |
| New York Giants | 13 | 4 | 0 | .765 | 308 | 98 | L1 |
| Chicago Bears | 9 | 4 | 1 | .692 | 169 | 71 | W5 |
| Brooklyn Dodgers | 7 | 4 | 1 | .636 | 154 | 59 | L1 |
| Providence Steam Roller | 6 | 4 | 1 | .600 | 90 | 125 | L1 |
| Staten Island Stapletons | 5 | 5 | 2 | .500 | 95 | 112 | L1 |
| Chicago Cardinals | 5 | 6 | 2 | .455 | 128 | 132 | L1 |
| Portsmouth Spartans | 5 | 6 | 3 | .455 | 176 | 161 | T1 |
| Frankford Yellow Jackets | 4 | 13 | 1 | .235 | 113 | 321 | T1 |
| Minneapolis Red Jackets | 1 | 7 | 1 | .125 | 27 | 165 | L6 |
| Newark Tornadoes | 1 | 10 | 1 | .091 | 51 | 190 | L6 |

Note: Tie games were not officially counted in the standings until 1972.
