= Spider Johnson =

American football player (1907–1966)

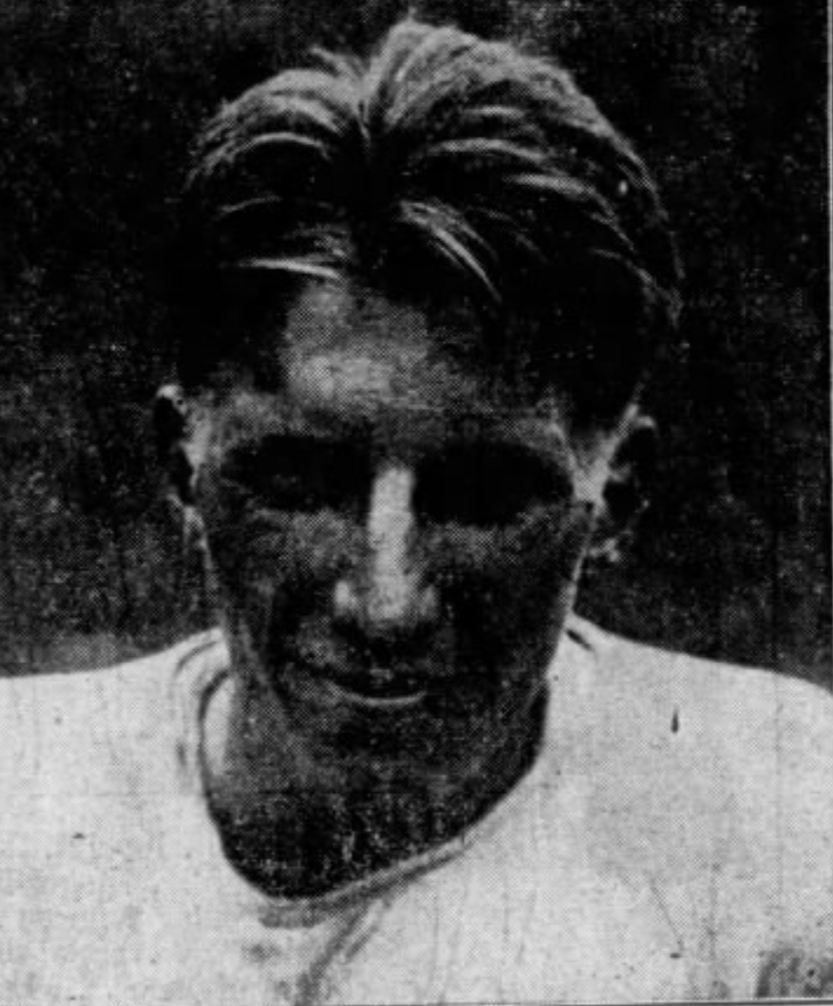

No. 62
- Position: Tackle

Personal information
- Born: May 16, 1907; Albo, Nebraska, U.S.
- Died: March 7, 1966 (aged 58)
- Listed height: 6 ft 4 in (1.93 m)
- Listed weight: 210 lb (95 kg)

Career information
- College: Chattanooga

Career history
- Portsmouth Spartans (1930)
- Stats at Pro Football Reference

Robert Alexander "Spider" Johnson (May 16, 1907 – March 7, 1966) was an American professional football tackle who played one season with the Portsmouth Spartans of the National Football League (NFL). He played college football at the University of Chattanooga.

== Early life ==
Robert Alexander Johnson was born on May 16, 1907, in Albo, Nebraska. He was a two-year letterman for the Chattanooga Moccasins of the University of Chattanooga from 1928 to 1929. On November 9, 1929, he broke a bone in his leg during a game against the Howard Bulldogs.

== Professional career ==
Johnson played in three games for the Portsmouth Spartans of the National Football League during the team's inaugural 1930 season. He was listed as a tackle during his time with the Spartans. He stood 6'4" and weighed 210 pounds.

== Personal life ==
Johnson died on March 7, 1966.
