= 1930 Green Bay Packers season =

NFL team season

- Head coach: Curly Lambeau
- Home stadium: City Stadium

Results
- Record: 10–3–1
- League place: 1st NFL

The 1930 Green Bay Packers season was their 12th season overall and their tenth in the National Football League. The team finished with a 10–3–1 record under coach Curly Lambeau earning them a first-place finish and the Packers' second consecutive National Football League Championship.

== Schedule ==
Week	Date	Opponent	Result	Record
1	September 21	Chicago Cardinals	W 14–0	1–0
2	September 28	Chicago Bears	W 7–0	2–0
3	October 5	New York Giants	W 14–7	3–0
4	October 12	Frankford Yellow Jackets	W 27–12	4–0
5	October 19	at Minneapolis Red Jackets	W 13–0	5–0
6	October 26	Minneapolis Red Jackets	W 19–0	6–0
7	November 2	Portsmouth Spartans	W 47–13	7–0
8	November 9	at Chicago Bears	W 13–12	8–0
9	November 16	at Chicago Cardinals	L 6–13	8–1
10	November 23	at New York Giants	L 6–13	8–2
11	November 27	at Frankford Yellow Jackets	W 25–7	9–2
12	November 30	at Staten Island Stapletons	W 37–7	10–2
13	December 7	at Chicago Bears	L 0–21	10–3
14	December 14	at Portsmouth Spartans	T 6–6	10–3–1

== Standings ==
NFL standings
	W	L	T	PCT	PF	PA	STK
Green Bay Packers	10	3	1	.769	234	111	T1
New York Giants	13	4	0	.765	308	98	L1
Chicago Bears	9	4	1	.692	169	71	W5
Brooklyn Dodgers	7	4	1	.636	154	59	L1
Providence Steam Roller	6	4	1	.600	90	125	L1
Staten Island Stapletons	5	5	2	.500	95	112	L1
Chicago Cardinals	5	6	2	.455	128	132	L1
Portsmouth Spartans	5	6	3	.455	176	161	T1
Frankford Yellow Jackets	4	13	1	.235	113	321	T1
Minneapolis Red Jackets	1	7	1	.125	27	165	L6
Newark Tornadoes	1	10	1	.091	51	190	L6

Note: Tie games were not officially counted in the standings until 1972.
