= Gordon Watkins =

American football player (1907–1974)

Profile
- Position: Offensive lineman

Personal information
- Born: June 19, 1907; Atlanta, Georgia, U.S.
- Died: April 8, 1974 (aged 66); Atlanta, Georgia, U.S.
- Listed height: 6 ft 1 in (1.85 m)
- Listed weight: 220 lb (100 kg)

Career information
- College: Georgia Tech

Career history
- 1930: Minneapolis Red Jackets
- 1930: Frankford Yellow Jackets
- 1931: Brooklyn Dodgers

Gordon Campbell Watkins (June 19, 1907 - April 8, 1974) was an American professional football player who played offensive lineman for two seasons for the Minneapolis Red Jackets, Frankford Yellow Jackets, and Brooklyn Dodgers.
