= Saul Mielziner =

American football player (1905–1985)

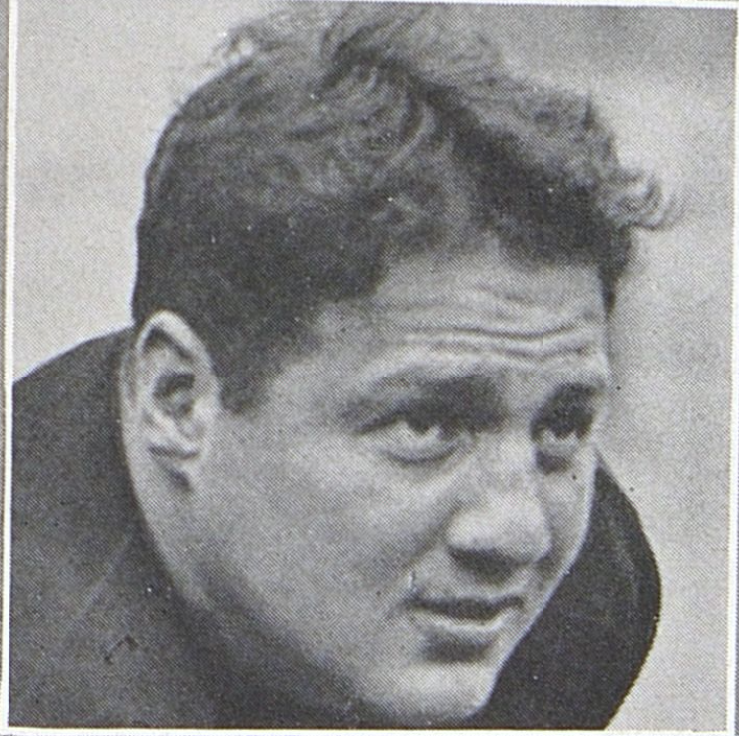
- Meilziner with Carnegie Tech, 1938

No. 6, 24
- Positions: Center, guard, tackle, linebacker

Personal information
- Born: June 1, 1905; Cleveland, Ohio, U.S.
- Died: October 13, 1985 (aged 80); Levittown, Pennsylvania, U.S.
- Listed height: 6 ft 1 in (1.85 m)
- Listed weight: 245 lb (111 kg)

Career information
- High school: Cleveland (OH) Glenville; The Kiski School
- College: Carnegie Mellon

Career history
- New York Giants (1929–1930); Brooklyn Dodgers (1931–1934)
- Stats at Pro Football Reference

Saul Mielziner (June 1, 1905 – October 13, 1985) was an American professional football center. He played for the New York Giants from 1929 to 1930 and for the Brooklyn Dodgers from 1931 to 1934.
