= Sargent Township, North Dakota =

- Township
- Location within the state of North Dakota
- Coordinates: 46°5′16″N 97°48′35″W
- Country: United States
- State: North Dakota
- County: Sargent

Area
  - Total: 36.0 sq mi (93.2 km^{2})
  - Land: 36.0 sq mi (93.2 km^{2})
  - Water: 0.039 sq mi (0.1 km^{2})
- Elevation: 1,299 ft (396 m)

Population (2000)
  - Total: 49
  - Density: 1.8/sq mi (0.7/km^{2})
- Time zone: UTC-6 (Central (CST))
  - Summer (DST): UTC-5 (CDT)
- ZIP code: 58017
- Area code: 701
- FIPS code: 38-08980
- GNIS feature ID: 1036788

Sargent Township is a civil township in Sargent County, North Dakota, United States.

Closest city is Cogswell, North Dakota, on the North border of the Township. Elevation in Sargent Township, North Dakota is 1,299.0 ft. (396.0 meters). Since 2000, it has had a population growth of -34.69 percent. There are 50 Farms in Sargent Township, North Dakota.

Continental Congress made a Land Ordinance on May 20, 1785, this Ordinance made a rectangular system for public land surveys. This was modified somewhat with the Land Act of 1796. The Land Ordinance made public lands in 30 states divided by lines using true North and South, with townships six miles square. The townships are then divided into 36 sections, each one mile square and containing approximately 640 acres in each section.

The Township as a large slough, Meszaros slough. Local cemeteries are Mount Calvary Cemetery and Nicholson Cemetery. Local lakes are Lake Schimmer and Lake Taayer.

United States House of Representative is North Dakota's at-large congressional district.
