= Emil Mayer =

Austrian photographer, lawyer, inventor, and businessperson

Dr. Emil Mayer FRPS
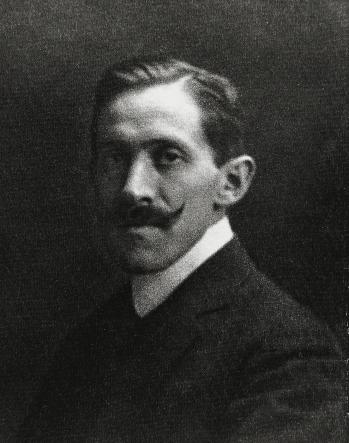
- Portrait of Dr. Emil Mayer
- Born: 3 October 1871; Neubydzow, Bohemia
- Died: 8 June 1938 (aged 66); Vienna, Austria
- Education: University of Vienna
- Known for: Photography
- Movement: Pictorialism
- Spouse: Elisabeth Deutsch (18 March 1882 – 8 June 1938) (m. 1903; died 1938)
- Elected: Wiener Amateur-Photographen-Klubs (President, 1907 – 1927); Royal Photographic Society (Member, 1926; Fellow, 1927); Photographic Society of Philadelphia (Honorary Member, 13 December 1927)

Dr. Emil Mayer FRPS (3 October 1871 – 8 June 1938) was an Austrian photographer, lawyer, inventor, and businessperson.

== Biography ==
=== Early life ===
Emil Mayer was born on 3 October 1871 in Neubydzow, Bohemia (now Nový Bydžov, Czech Republic) to Leopold and Anna Mayer. In the summer of 1882, Mayer moved with his family to Vienna, Austria, where “his father set up business as a merchant.”

From 1891 to 1896, Mayer studied law at the University of Vienna, where he earned the Juris Doctor.

=== Personal life ===
While still a student, Mayer left the Jewish community and converted to Catholicism. On 8 March 1894 he was baptized at the Johann Nepomuk Church (Leopoldstadt) under the name Robert Emil. The painter Max von Esterle was his godfather.

=== Marriage ===
On 6 June 1903 he married Elisabeth Deutsch (18 March 1882 – 8 June 1938).

=== Death ===
To escape persecution from the Nazi regime after the annexation of Austria in March 1938, Mayer and his wife died by suicide in their home (Böcklinstraße 12) in Vienna on 8 June 1938.

== Career ==
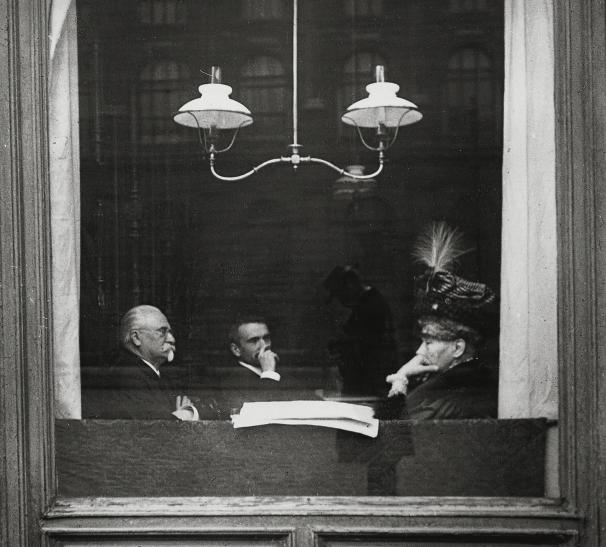
Kaffeehausrunde, Babenbergerstrasse, Vienna. (Reflection of Emil Mayer in the window).

After Mayer completed his studies at the University of Vienna, he established a law practice at Salvatorgasse 10 in Vienna.

Mayer's first experience in photography was as an amateur, and he was a member of several Viennese photographer associations that focused on artistic photography. His artistic photos include documentary images of Wienerstraße images.

Mayer was an honorary member of many domestic and foreign photographers' clubs. He also authored a textbook and was awarded several patents for photographic devices.

=== DREM-Zentrale ===
Finally, Mayer left the law firm and founded a photographic technology company DREM-Zentrale with Nikolaus Benedik. The company's name was an abbreviation of DR. E. Mayer. International branches of the company included, DREM Products Corporation in New York and DREM Products Ltd. in London, England.

== Published works ==
- 1912 – Wurstelprater by Felix Salten with 75 photographs by Emil Mayer.
- 1912 – Das Bromöldruckverfahren. Halle a.S.: Knapp, 1912.
- 1923 – Bromoil Printing and Bromoil Transfer. Boston, Mass: American Photographic Publishing Co., 1923. Translated from the seventh German edition by Frank Roy Fraprie, FRPS (1874 – 1951), editor of American Photography.
- 1927 – Bromöldruck und -Umdruck. (Enzyklopädie der Photographie; 81). 10. und 11. ergänzte Auflage. Knapp, Halle (Saale) 1927.
- 1927 – "A Manual of Bromoil & Transfer." Practical Photography, no. 12, 1927. Translated by Joseph M. Bing.

== Honors, awards and distinctions ==
- Photographic Society of Philadelphia – Honorary Member, 13 December 1927

== Gallery ==
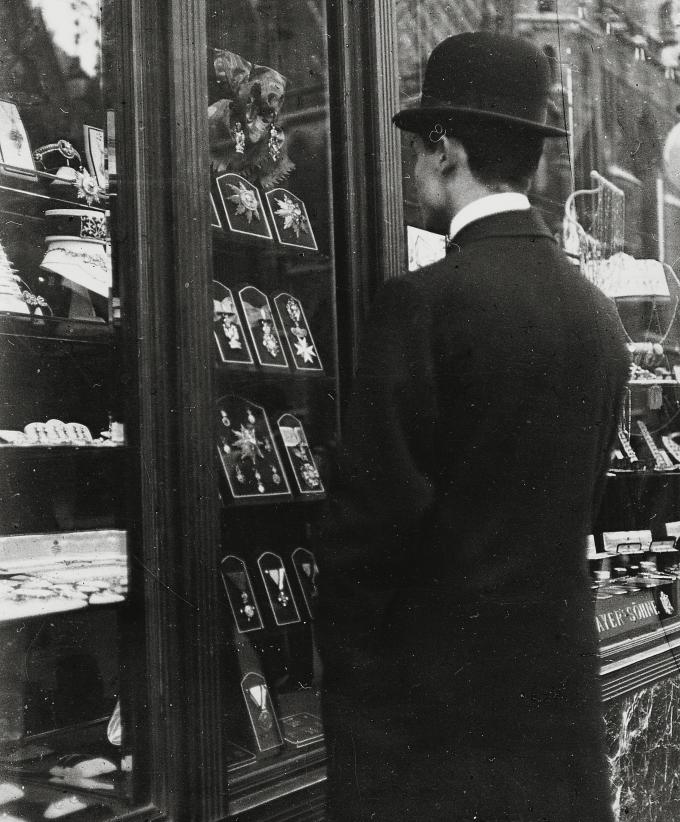
Orden und Ehrenzeichen, Stock im Eisen Platz, Vienna

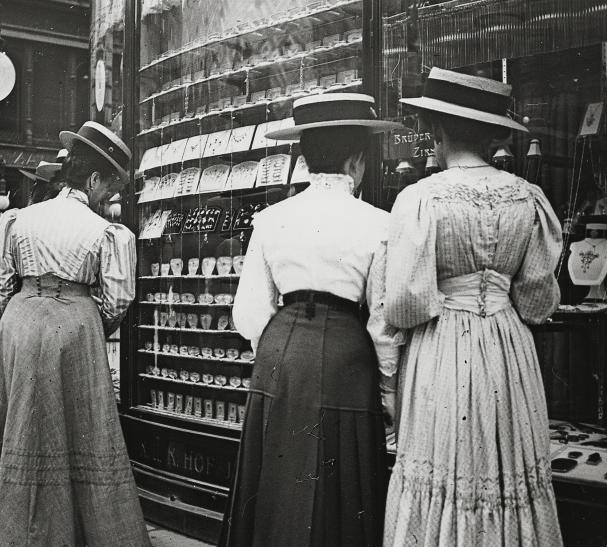
Vor dem Juweliergeschäft, Graben 7, Vienna

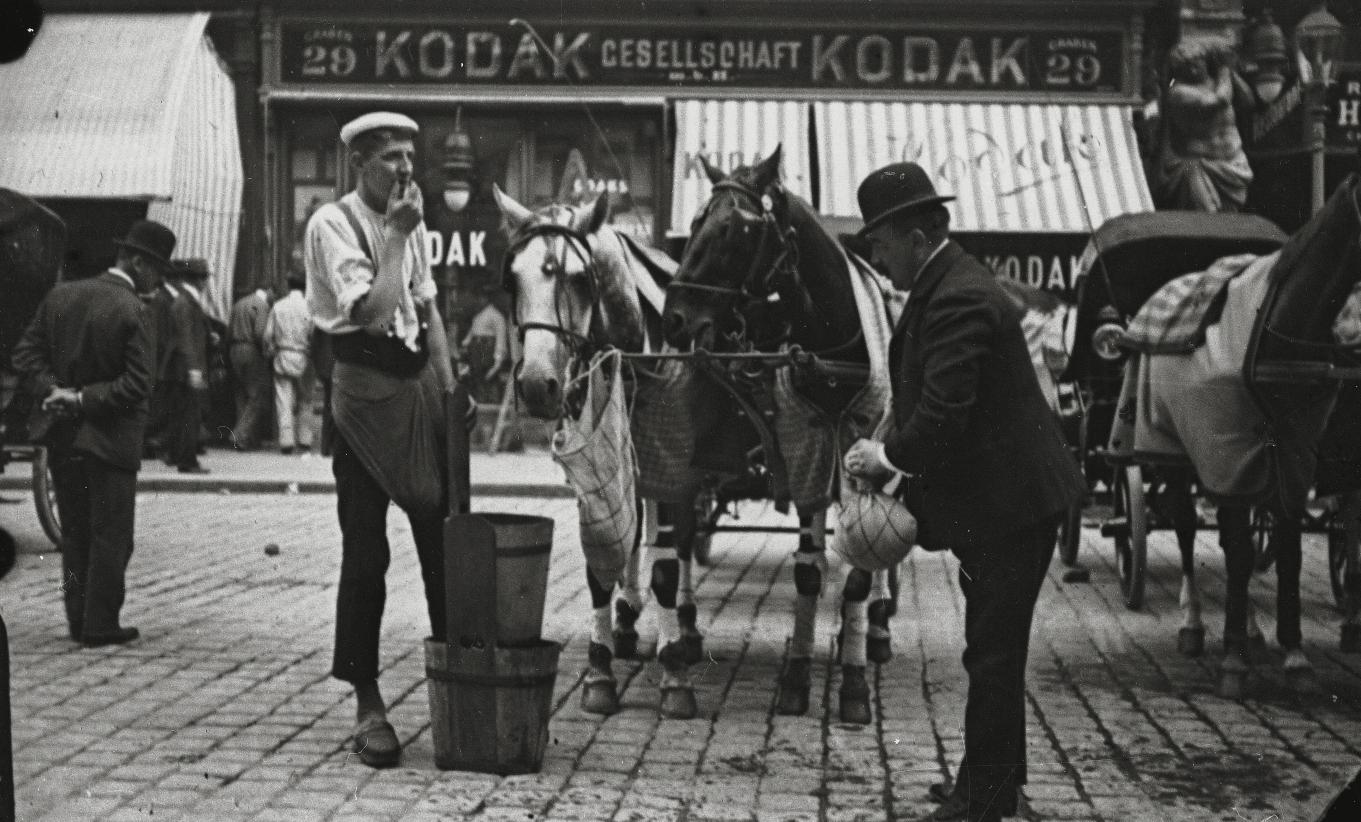
Fiaker und Wasserer vor dem Kodak-Geschäft Graben 29, Vienna

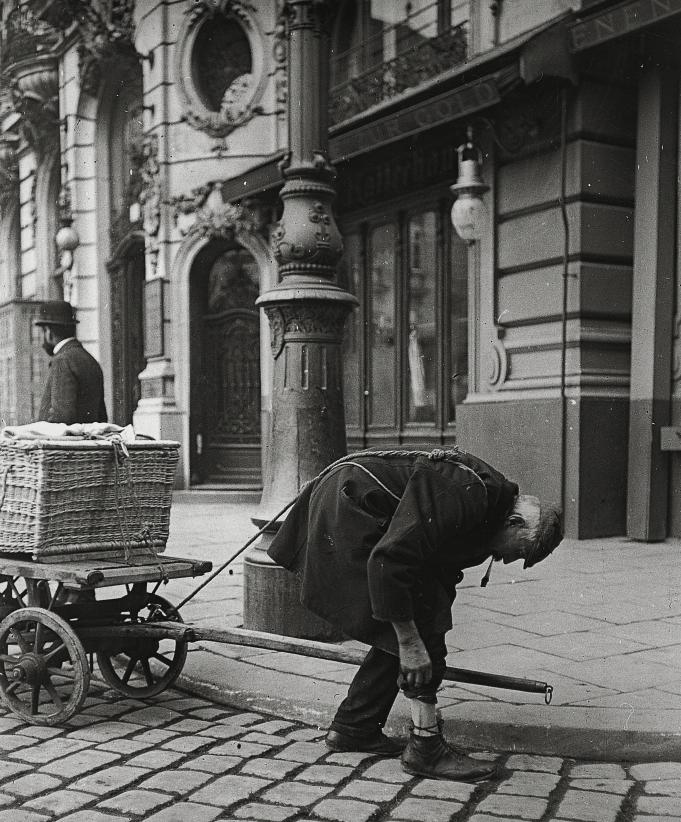
Zugmensch, Ledererhof, Am Hof 11, Vienna

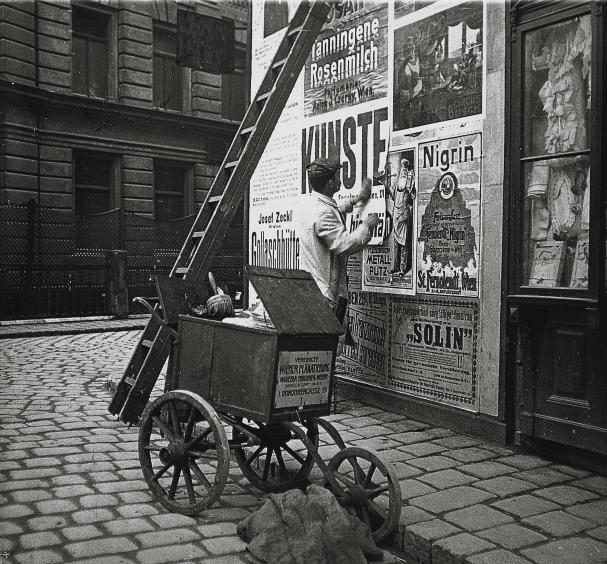
Plakatankleber, Vienna

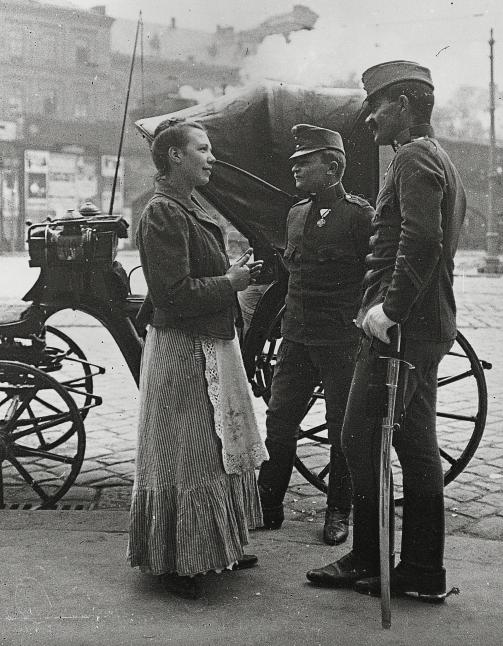
Dienstbotin und Soldaten am Radetzkyplatz, Vienna

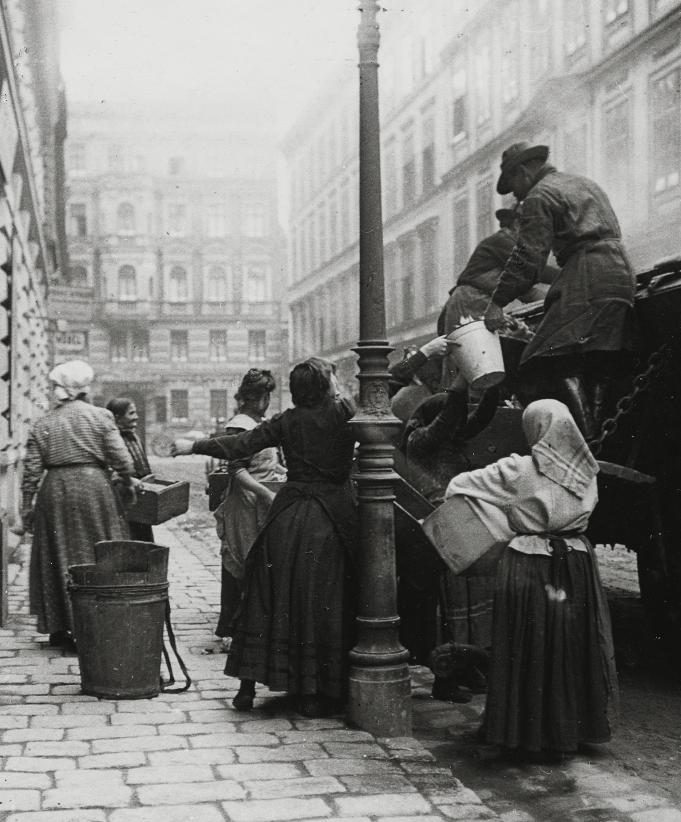
„Mistbauer“ bei der Müllbeseitigung, Vienna

== See also ==
- Oil print process
- Street photography
