= Aaron Grant =

American football player (1908–1966)

Profile
- Position: Center

Personal information
- Born: July 3, 1908; Rockwood, Tennessee, U.S.
- Died: September 22, 1966 (aged 58); Rockwood, Tennessee, U.S.
- Listed height: 6 ft 2 in (1.88 m)
- Listed weight: 285 lb (129 kg)

Career information
- High school: Maryville (Maryville, Tennessee)
- College: Tennessee Wesleyan (1925–1927); Chattanooga (1928–1929)

Career history
- Portsmouth Spartans (1930)
- Stats at Pro Football Reference

Aaron Thomas Grant Jr. (July 3, 1908 – September 22, 1966) was an American professional football center who played one season with the Portsmouth Spartans of the National Football League (NFL). He played college football at Tennessee Wesleyan College and the University of Chattanooga

== Early life and college ==
Aaron Thomas Grant Jr. was born on July 3, 1908, in Rockwood, Tennessee. He attended Maryville High School in Maryville, Tennessee.

He first played college football for the Tennessee Wesleyan Bulldogs of Tennessee Wesleyan College from 1925 to 1927. He was a letterman in 1925. He transferred to play for the Chattanooga Moccasins of the University of Chattanooga from 1928 to 1929, lettering both seasons. Grant was inducted into Tennessee Wesleyan's athletic hall of fame in 1993.

== Professional career ==
Grant signed with the Portsmouth Spartans (now Detroit Lions) of the National Football League (NFL) in 1930. He played in one game for the Spartans during the team's inaugural 1930 season before being released later in 1930.

== Personal life ==
Grant died on September 22, 1966, in Rockwood at the age of 58.
