= 1930 Minneapolis Red Jackets season =

National Football League team season

- Head coach: George Gibson
- Home stadium: Nicollet Park

Results
- Record: 1–7–1
- League place: 10th in NFL

The 1930 Minneapolis Red Jackets season was their sixth and final season in the league. The team improved on their previous output of 1–9, losing only seven games.

== Schedule ==
Week	Date	Opponent	Result	Record
1	September 28	Chicago Cardinals	T 7–7	0–0–1
2	October 5	Chicago Bears	L 0–20	0–1–1
3	October 12	Portsmouth Spartans	W 13–0	1–1–1
4	October 19	Green Bay Packers	L 0–13	1–2–1
5	October 26	at Green Bay Packers	L 0–19	1–3–1
6	November 2	at Chicago Bears	L 7–20	1–4–1
7	November 9	at Brooklyn Dodgers	L 0–34	1–5–1
8	November 23	at Providence Steam Roller	L 0–10	1–6–1
9	December 7	at Portsmouth Spartans	L 0–42	1–7–1

== Standings ==
NFL standings
	W	L	T	PCT	PF	PA	STK
Green Bay Packers	10	3	1	.769	234	111	T1
New York Giants	13	4	0	.765	308	98	L1
Chicago Bears	9	4	1	.692	169	71	W5
Brooklyn Dodgers	7	4	1	.636	154	59	L1
Providence Steam Roller	6	4	1	.600	90	125	L1
Staten Island Stapletons	5	5	2	.500	95	112	L1
Chicago Cardinals	5	6	2	.455	128	132	L1
Portsmouth Spartans	5	6	3	.455	176	161	T1
Frankford Yellow Jackets	4	13	1	.235	113	321	T1
Minneapolis Red Jackets	1	7	1	.125	27	165	L6
Newark Tornadoes	1	10	1	.091	51	190	L6

Note: Tie games were not officially counted in the standings until 1972.

== Roster ==
- Ted Nemzek (February 11, 1906 – May 21, 1968), tackle (4 games), Moorhead State College
