= 1930 Newark Tornadoes season =

National Football League team season

- Owner: Edwin Simandl
- Head coach: Al McGall, Andy Salata, and Jack Fish
- Home stadium: Newark Schools Stadium and Newark Velodrome

Results
- Record: 1–10–1
- Division place: 11th NFL

The 1930 Newark Tornadoes season was their second and final in the National Football League. The team failed to improve on their previous output of 3–5–4, winning only one game. Playing eight games in October and losing 6, they finished eleventh in the league.

== Schedule ==
Game	Date	Opponent	Result	Record	Venue	Recap
1	September 14	at Portsmouth Spartans	L 6–13	0–1	Universal Stadium	Recap
2	September 17	New York Giants	L 0–32	0–2	Newark Schools Stadium	Recap
3	September 21	at Staten Island Stapletons	L 6–12	0–3	Thompson Stadium	Recap
4	September 23	Frankford Yellow Jackets	L 6–13	0–4	Newark Schools Stadium	Recap
5	October 1	Staten Island Stapletons	T 7–7	0–4–1	Newark Schools Stadium	Recap
6	October 4	at Frankford Yellow Jackets	W 19–0	1–4–1	Frankford Stadium	Recap
7	October 5	at Providence Steam Roller	L 0–14	1–5–1	Cycledrome	Recap
8	October 8	Chicago Cardinals	L 0–13	1–6–1	Newark Schools Stadium	Recap
9	October 12	at Brooklyn Dodgers	L 0–32	1–7–1	Ebbets Field	Recap
10	October 19	Brooklyn Dodgers	L 0–14	1–8–1	Newark Velodrome	Recap
11	October 26	Staten Island Stapletons	L 0–6	1–9–1	Newark Velodrome	Recap
12	October 30	at New York Giants	L 7–34	1–10–1	Polo Grounds	Recap

== Standings ==
NFL standings
	W	L	T	PCT	PF	PA	STK
Green Bay Packers	10	3	1	.769	234	111	T1
New York Giants	13	4	0	.765	308	98	L1
Chicago Bears	9	4	1	.692	169	71	W5
Brooklyn Dodgers	7	4	1	.636	154	59	L1
Providence Steam Roller	6	4	1	.600	90	125	L1
Staten Island Stapletons	5	5	2	.500	95	112	L1
Chicago Cardinals	5	6	2	.455	128	132	L1
Portsmouth Spartans	5	6	3	.455	176	161	T1
Frankford Yellow Jackets	4	13	1	.235	113	321	T1
Minneapolis Red Jackets	1	7	1	.125	27	165	L6
Newark Tornadoes	1	10	1	.091	51	190	L6

Note: Tie games were not officially counted in the standings until 1972.
