= Herb Eschbach =

American football player (1907–1970)

- Herb Eschbach, 1930

Profile
- Position: Center

Personal information
- Born: April 26, 1907; Lancaster, Pennsylvania
- Died: February 2, 1970 (aged 62); Williamsport, Pennsylvania
- Listed height: 6 ft 0 in (1.83 m)
- Listed weight: 190 lb (86 kg)

Career information
- High school: Franklin & Marshall Academy (PA)
- College: Penn State

Career history
- Providence Steam Roller (1930–1931)
- Stats at Pro Football Reference

Harold Heins "Herb" Eschbach (April 26, 1907 – February 2, 1970) was an American football player.

Eschbach was born in 1907 in Lancaster, Pennsylvania. He attended the Franklin & Marshall Academy in Lancaster and later enrolled at Pennsylvania State University. He played college football as a center for Penn State from 1926 to 1929. He also studied electrical engineering and threw the discus for the track team at Penn State.

He played professional football in the National Football League (NFL) as a center for the Providence Steam Roller during the 1930 and 1931 seasons. He appeared in 11 NFL games. He worked as an engineer in New York while playing for the Steam Roller.

Eschbach moved in 1940 to Williamsport, Pennsylvania. He worked for the Bethlehem Steel. He was married to Helen J. Fisher. He died in 1970 at age 62 at Divine Providence Hospital in Williamsport.
