= 1930 Brooklyn Dodgers (NFL) season =

National Football League team season

1930 Brooklyn Dodgers season
- Owner: Bill Dwyer
- Head coach: Jack Depler
- Home stadium: Ebbets Field

Results
- Record: 7–4–1
- Division place: 4th NFL
- Playoffs: No playoffs until 1932

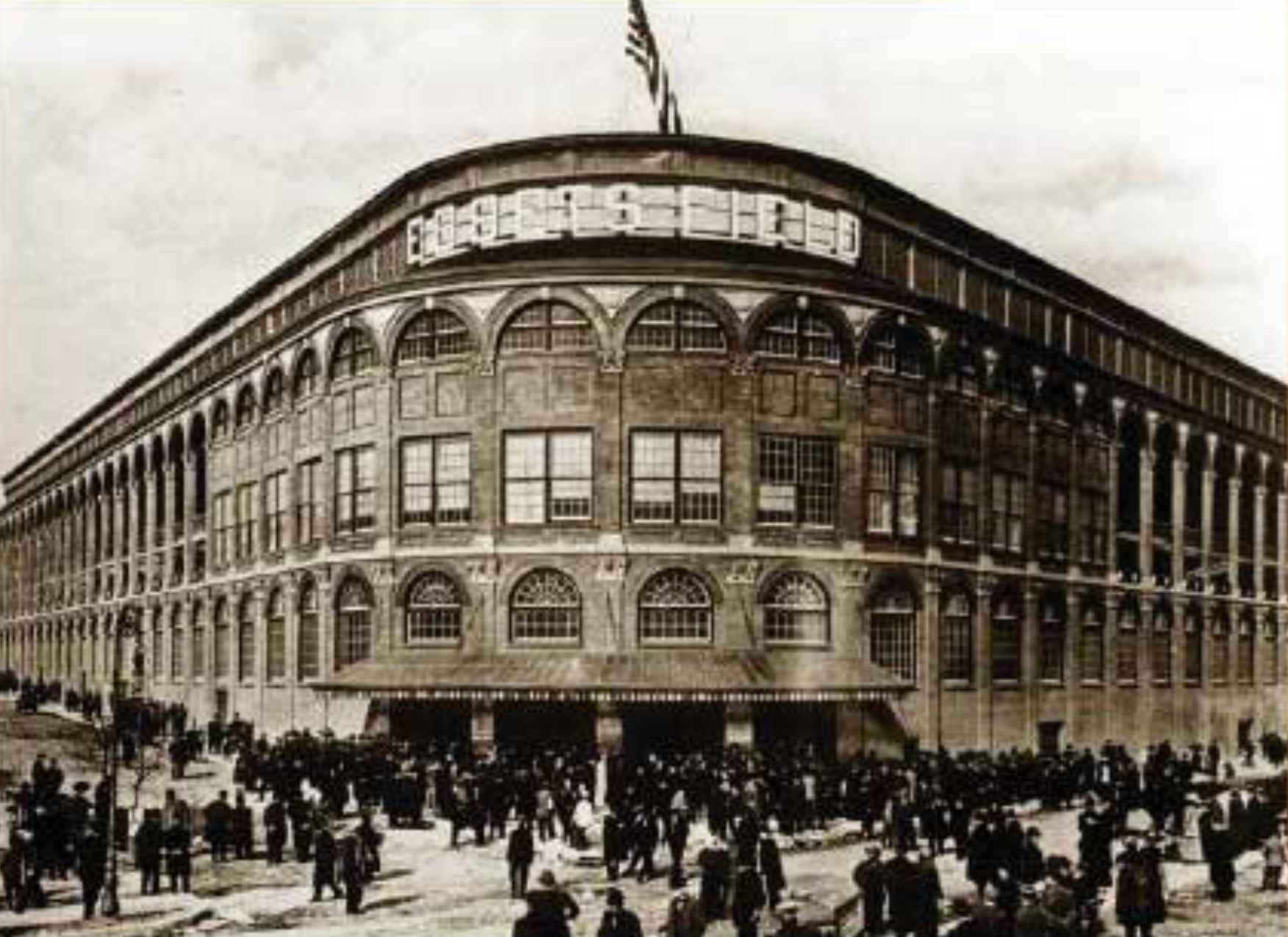
Ebbets Field, home stadium of the Brooklyn Dodgers until 1957.

The 1930 Brooklyn Dodgers season was their inaugural season in the league and the 11th season overall for the erratic Triangles-Colts franchise. The team finished fourth in the league at 7–4–1. They both shut out five opponents and were shut out by five opponents.

The Dodgers had purchased the franchise rights of the Dayton Triangles, but most of the team's roster came from the previous year's Orange Tornadoes team as it was unfeasible for most of the Triangles' players to uproot their families and move from Dayton to Brooklyn on short-notice during the Great Depression.

== Schedule ==
| Game | Date | Opponent | Result | Record | Venue | Recap |
|---|---|---|---|---|---|---|
| 1 | September 21 | at Chicago Bears | T 0–0 | 0–0–1 | Mills Stadium | Recap |
| 2 | September 24 | at Portsmouth Spartans | L 0–12 | 0–1–1 | Universal Stadium | Recap |
| 3 | October 5 | at Staten Island Stapletons | W 20–0 | 1–1–1 | Thompson Stadium | Recap |
| 4 | October 12 | Newark Tornadoes | W 32–0 | 2–1–1 | Ebbets Field | Recap |
| 5 | October 18 | at Frankford Yellow Jackets | W 14–7 | 3–1–1 | Frankford Stadium | Recap |
| 6 | October 19 | at Newark Tornadoes | W 14–0 | 4–1–1 | Newark Velodrome | Recap |
| 7 | November 2 | at Providence Steam Roller | L 0–3 | 4–2–1 | Cycledrome | Recap |
| 8 | November 9 | Minneapolis Red Jackets | W 34–0 | 5–2–1 | Ebbets Field | Recap |
| 9 | November 23 | Staten Island Stapletons | L 0–6 | 5–3–1 | Ebbets Field | Recap |
| 10 | November 27 | Providence Steam Roller | W 33–12 | 6–3–1 | Ebbets Field | Recap |
| 11 | November 30 | at New York Giants | W 7–6 | 7–3–1 | Polo Grounds | Recap |
| 12 | December 7 | New York Giants | L 0–13 | 7–4–1 | Ebbets Field | Recap |

== Standings ==
NFL standings
| | W | L | T | PCT | PF | PA | STK |
|---|---|---|---|---|---|---|---|
| Green Bay Packers | 10 | 3 | 1 | .769 | 234 | 111 | T1 |
| New York Giants | 13 | 4 | 0 | .765 | 308 | 98 | L1 |
| Chicago Bears | 9 | 4 | 1 | .692 | 169 | 71 | W5 |
| Brooklyn Dodgers | 7 | 4 | 1 | .636 | 154 | 59 | L1 |
| Providence Steam Roller | 6 | 4 | 1 | .600 | 90 | 125 | L1 |
| Staten Island Stapletons | 5 | 5 | 2 | .500 | 95 | 112 | L1 |
| Chicago Cardinals | 5 | 6 | 2 | .455 | 128 | 132 | L1 |
| Portsmouth Spartans | 5 | 6 | 3 | .455 | 176 | 161 | T1 |
| Frankford Yellow Jackets | 4 | 13 | 1 | .235 | 113 | 321 | T1 |
| Minneapolis Red Jackets | 1 | 7 | 1 | .125 | 27 | 165 | L6 |
| Newark Tornadoes | 1 | 10 | 1 | .091 | 51 | 190 | L6 |

Note: Tie games were not officially counted in the standings until 1972.
