= Hal Griffen =

American football player and coach (1902–1947)

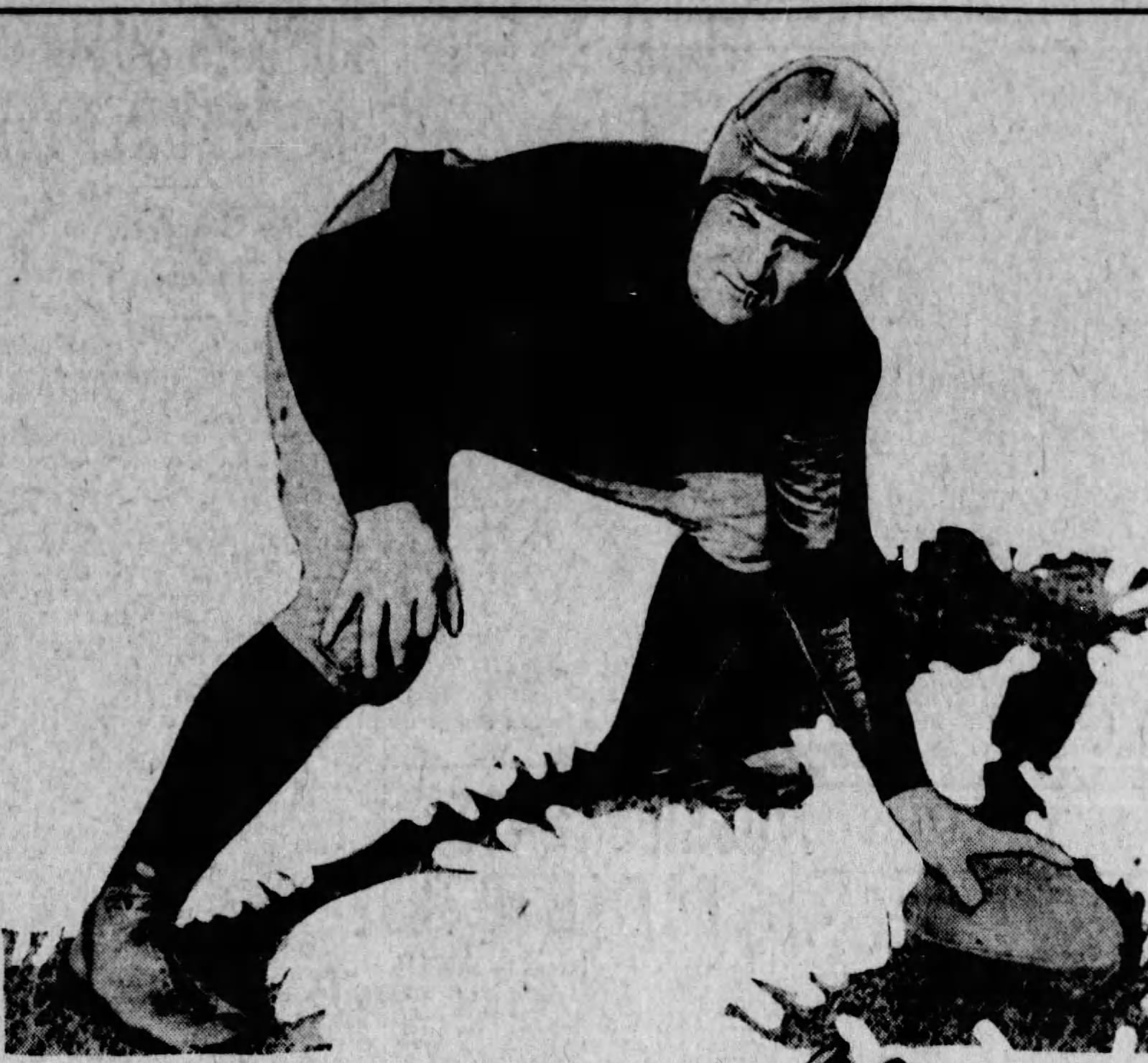
- Griffen in 1925.

Profile
- Positions: Center, tackle

Personal information
- Born: March 1, 1902; Sioux City, Iowa, U.S.
- Died: December 31, 1947 (aged 45); Nome, Alaska, U.S.
- Listed height: 6 ft 1 in (1.85 m)
- Listed weight: 247 lb (112 kg)

Career information
- High school: Sioux City (IA)
- College: Iowa

Career history

Playing
- New York Yankees (1926); Green Bay Packers (1928); Portsmouth Spartans (1930, 1932)

Coaching
- Portsmouth Spartans (1930) Head coach

Awards and highlights
- Second-team All-Big Ten (1925)

Head coaching record
- Regular season: 5–6–3 (.464)
- Postseason: 0–0 (–)
- Career: 5–6–3 (.464)
- Coaching profile at Pro Football Reference

Harold Winslow "Hal" Griffen (March 1, 1902 – December 31, 1947) was an American football player and coach. He played professionally as a Center and tackle with the New York Yankees, Green Bay Packers and Portsmouth Spartans of the National Football League (NFL). He also served as the first head coach for the Spartans, for one season in 1930. Griffen played College football at the University of Iowa.
