= Hoot Drury =

American football player (1906–1939)

- Drury c. 1930

Profile
- Position: End

Personal information
- Born: July 2, 1906; Idaho
- Died: August 11, 1939 (aged 33); Spokane, Washington
- Listed height: 6 ft 4 in (1.93 m)
- Listed weight: 189 lb (86 kg)

Career information
- High school: Moscow (ID)
- College: Idaho, Saint Louis

Career history
- Chicago Bears (1930–1931)

Lyle Lloyd "Hoot" Drury (July 2, 1906 – August 11, 1939) was an American football player.

A native of Idaho, Drury played college football and basketball for Saint Louis University.

He also played professional football in the National Football League (NFL) for the Chicago Bears during the 1930 and 1931 seasons. He appeared in 24 NFL games, 14 as a starter, and scored one touchdown. Drury also held an amateur heavyweight boxing championship.

After retiring from football, he worked for the forest service near Priest River, Idaho. He died in 1939, age 33, at Spokane, Washington, after two years of illness.
