= Al Graham =

American football player (1905–1969)

Profile
- Position: Guard

Personal information
- Born: September 27, 1905; Miamisburg, Ohio, U.S.
- Died: October 1969 (aged 61)
- Listed height: 6 ft 0 in (1.83 m)
- Listed weight: 211 lb (96 kg)

Career information
- College: None

Career history
- Dayton Triangles (1925–1929); Portsmouth Spartans (1930); Providence Steam Roller (1930–1931); Chicago Cardinals (1932–1933)

Career statistics
- Games played: 73
- Stats at Pro Football Reference

Alfred Graham (September 27, 1905 – October 1969) was a guard who played nine seasons in the National Football League (NFL), mainly for the Dayton Triangles . He was born in Miamisburg, Ohio and died in Dayton, Ohio.

Despite being a lineman, he twice scored touchdowns via fumble recoveries, once in 1927 and again in 1929 (this one capping the only scoring drive for the 0–6 Triangles).
