= Walt Ambrose =

American football player (1905–1968)

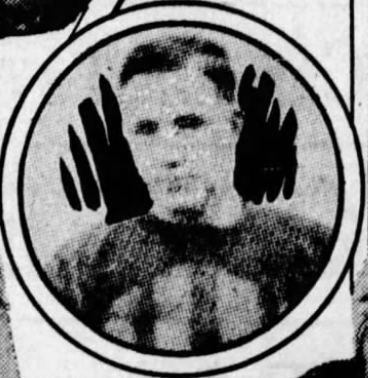
- Ambrose at Caroll University

Profile
- Position: Guard

Personal information
- Born: August 7, 1905; Portage, Wisconsin, U.S.
- Died: January 18, 1968 (aged 62); Portage, Wisconsin, U.S.
- Listed height: 5 ft 11 in (1.80 m)
- Listed weight: 210 lb (95 kg)

Career information
- College: Carroll (WI)

Career history
- Portsmouth Spartans (1930); Fort Atkinson Pros (1930)

Career statistics
- Games played: 1
- Stats at Pro Football Reference

Walter Louis Ambrose (August 7, 1905 – January 18, 1968) was an American football guard who played one game in the National Football League (NFL) for the Portsmouth Spartans. He played college football at Carroll University.

== Early life and education ==
Ambrose was born on August 7, 1905, in Portage, Wisconsin. He attended Portage High School, where he played as a fullback from 1921 until his graduation in 1924. He also was a "star" player in basketball and baseball.

In 1925, Ambrose enrolled at the University of Wisconsin, and was considered the best fullback prospect on the team, but "circumstances prevented" him from playing there. He instead joined Carroll University in fall of 1926, where he transitioned to the tackle position. Ambrose played for their freshman football team in his first year, and one year later became the starting tackle on the varsity squad. Following the 1928 season, Ambrose was elected team captain for his senior year. Weighing over 200 pounds, he was described as a "burly tackle" by The Oshkosh Northwestern. At the end of his senior season, Ambrose was named first-team All-Big Four by the league's coaches. The Portage Daily Register reported that he "was often mentioned as one of the greatest tackles in the country."

== Professional career ==
In 1930, Ambrose was signed to play professional football in the National Football League (NFL) by the Portsmouth Spartans. He had a very limited role with the team, and only appeared in one game as a substitute. Later in the season, Ambrose played for the Fort Atkinson Pros.

== Later life and death ==
After his brief career in professional football, Ambrose returned to Carroll University to finish his education. He was later employed as a conductor in the Milwaukee Road for over 25 years.

Ambrose was married to Vera Wetzel of North Freedom in 1948.

Ambrose died in Portage, Wisconsin, at the age of 62 in 1968.
