= Les Caywood =

American football player (1903–1986)

No. 4, 36, 8, 27
- Positions: Guard, tackle

Personal information
- Born: August 18, 1903; Sapulpa, Oklahoma, U.S.
- Died: February 4, 1986 (aged 82); Oakwood, Oklahoma, U.S.
- Listed height: 6 ft 0 in (1.83 m)
- Listed weight: 230 lb (104 kg)

Career information
- High school: Sapulpa (Sapulpa, Oklahoma)
- College: St. John's

Career history

Playing
- Buffalo Rangers (1926); Cleveland Bulldogs (1927); Pottsville Maroons (1927); New York Giants (1927); Detroit Wolverines (1928); New York Giants (1929–1931); Chicago Cardinals (1931); Brooklyn Dodgers (1932); New York Giants (1932); Cincinnati Reds (1933–1934); St. Louis Gunners (1934)

Coaching
- Cincinnati Reds (1934) Line coach

Awards and highlights
- NFL champion (1927)
- Stats at Pro Football Reference

Lester Leroy "Wimpy" Caywood (August 18, 1903 – February 4, 1986) was an American football player and coach. He played professionally in the National Football League (NFL) as a guard and tackle. Caywood made his National Football League debut with the Buffalo Rangers in 1926. Over the next nine season he played for the Cleveland Bulldogs, Cincinnati Reds, St. Louis Gunners, Detroit Wolverines, Brooklyn Dodgers, Pottsville Maroons, Chicago Cardinals and the New York Giants, where he was a part of the Giants 1927 NFL Championship team. He also was a member of the Kansas City Cowboys in 1926, although he never actually played in a game with the team.

Caywood served as the line coach and first assistant to head coach Algy Clark for the Cincinnati Reds in 1934.
