= Koester Christensen =

American football player (1905–1946)

Profile
- Position: End

Personal information
- Born: April 28, 1905; Escanaba, Michigan, U.S.
- Died: May 16, 1946 (aged 41); Escanaba, Michigan, U.S.
- Listed height: 5 ft 10 in (1.78 m)
- Listed weight: 195 lb (88 kg)

Career information
- High school: Escanaba (MI)
- College: Michigan State University

Career history
- Portsmouth Spartans (1930)
- Stats at Pro Football Reference

Koester L. "Keddy" Christensen (April 28, 1905 – May 16, 1946) was an American football player. He played college football for Michigan State College (later known as Michigan State University). He also played professional football in the National Football League (NFL) for the Portsmouth Spartans during the 1926 season. After his football career ended, Christensen returned to his home town of Escanaba, Michigan, where he worked as a commercial fisherman. During World War II, he served aboard a submarine chaser and other ships in the United States Navy, attaining the rank of lieutenant. He died of a heart attack at his home in Escanaba in 1946 at age 41.
