= Garland Grange =

American football player (1906–1981)

- Grange in 1925

No. 25
- Positions: Halfback, end

Personal information
- Born: December 2, 1906; Forksville, Pennsylvania, U.S.
- Died: May 28, 1981 (aged 74); Miami, Florida, U.S.

Career information
- College: Illinois

Career history
- Chicago Bears (1929–1931)

Awards and highlights
- National champion (1927); Second-team All-Big Ten (1927)
- Stats at Pro Football Reference

Garland Arthur "Gardie" or "Pinky" Grange (December 2, 1906 – May 28, 1981) was an American professional football player for the Chicago Bears from 1929 until 1931. Prior to his professional playing career, he played college football at the University of Illinois. He was the younger brother of, Illinois and Bears' star, Red Grange. In 1932 he served as the head coach for the independent St. Louis Veterans and Memphis Tigers.
