= Newark Schools Stadium =

Two stadiums in New Jersey, US

- Interactive map of Newark Schools Stadium
- Former names: City Field
- Location: 450 Bloomfield Avenue, Roseville, Newark, New Jersey 07102
- Coordinates: 40.769866°N 74.184612°W
- Capacity: 25,000 (original); 5,600 (current)
- Surface: Grass (original stadium); Artificial (current)

Construction
- Opened: 1925 (original stadium); 2011 (current stadium)
- Demolished: 2009

Tenants
- Newark Stars (ECL) (1926); Newark Tornadoes (NFL) (1930); Newark Tornadoes (AA) (1930, 1937–1938); Newark Bears (AA) (1939–1941, 1963–1964); Newark Ukrainian Sitch (ASL) (1967–1968); Newark City Schools (1925–2006)

Newark Schools Stadium (originally named City Field, nicknamed "The Old Lady of Bloomfield Avenue") is the name of two stadiums that were both located on Bloomfield Avenue between Abington and Roseville Avenues in the Roseville section of Newark, New Jersey.

The first stadium was used primarily for football and was built in 1925. It was the home of the Newark Tornadoes of the National Football League during the 1930 season. The stadium was used for high school football until 2006. Baseball's Newark Stars of the Eastern Colored League, which was a part of the Negro leagues, also used the stadium in 1926. Its primary use, however, was for Newark's high schools. The original stadium was a reinforced concrete horseshoe shaped venue that had a maximum seating capacity of 25,000.

The original stadium was condemned in 2006 and demolished in 2009. In its place, a brand new Schools Stadium was constructed on the site and the new stadium opened in 2011.

The current Schools Stadium is also horseshoe shaped, but the seating is not arranged throughout the horseshoe like the old stadium was; instead, there are two metal bleacher sections, one on each side of the venue, and it has a capacity of 5,600.

The current stadium plays host to football games played by Barringer High School and Newark Collegiate Academy. It is one of four venues in Newark that are used by the seven high schools that field football teams in the city. In addition to Schools Stadium, games are played at Shabazz Stadium at Shabazz High School and Untermann Field at Weequahic High School. Shabazz shares their stadium with Central High School, and Weequahic shares theirs with West Side High School. East Side High School, which played their games at Schools Stadium until 2021, now plays at Eddie Moraes Stadium near their campus in the city’s Ironbound section.

== Soccer ==
For the 1967-68 American Soccer League (ASL) season, the Newark Ukrainian Sitch club moved its home games to the stadium. Prior to that season, 'Sitch' played at Ironbound field. The move to an approx. 25,000 capacity ground was welcomed as an improvement. The crowds never filled the stadium however and the Ukrainian Weekly refers to crowds only in the hundreds rather than thousands.

== Football ==
After the Tornadoes folded, Newark's American Association team became the primary tenants for the stadium. The American Association was the first attempt at establishing a farm system for the NFL. In 1937, the Tornadoes left Orange, New Jersey again for Newark. The team was once again called the Newark Tornadoes. In 1939, the team was purchased by George Halas, the owner of the Chicago Bears, and called the Newark Bears. The Bears played in the stadium until World War II; the Newark Bombers would play in the same league and stadium in 1946 after the war ended. In 1963, another Bears franchise would arrive when the Paterson Miners of the Atlantic Coast Football League moved to Newark, took on the Bears name, and played through 1965; its last year in Newark was in the Continental Football League. Another Continental league team, the Jersey Jays, played its 1969 season in Newark before moving to nearby Jersey City in 1970.

Most of Newark's public school football teams played at the stadium as well until 2006. The Stadium also served, since 1955 until its closing for reconstruction, as the home of the North Newark Little League (formerly the Saint Francis Xavier Little League).

== Baseball ==
Schools Stadium was also used for baseball. In 1926, the Newark Stars of the Eastern Colored League played at stadium. When the stadium was configured for baseball, the distance down the foul lines was so short, that balls hit over the fence were ground rule doubles. High school teams also used the field for baseball until 2006. The Stadium was also the original home of what has become one of the largest youth baseball programs in the City of Newark - the North Newark Little League. Formerly the St. Francis Xavier Little League, the youth of the program utilized the baseball fields from 1955. It was the last organization to have continued use of the facility (even after it was condemned in 2006) right up to the point of its closing for reconstruction.

== Track and field ==
Olympian Jesse Owens, once ran track there and lost to a Newark local named Eulace Peacock. Meanwhile, another Olympian, Milt Campbell began his track career at Newark Schools Stadium. The National Women's Olympic Trials also were held in the stadium in 1928.

== Riots ==
During the 1967 Newark riots, Schools Stadium served as the staging area for the New Jersey National Guard, who were summoned to Newark to reinforce the overwhelmed Newark Police Department.

== Decline and a new stadium ==
Years of neglect allowed the stadium to experience a large amount of deterioration and compromised structural integrity. At various points in its later years, parts of the stadium's wooden bleachers were blocked off with fencing to prevent spectators from sitting in these seats.

In 2006, a capital bond request was approved by the Newark City Council that included $63.7 million in funding for 14 projects that ranged from a new robotics center to the rebuilding of Schools Stadium. In Fall 2006, Schools Stadium was condemned and three years later the stadium was demolished. Barringer and East Side moved their games to Untermann Field while the new stadium was being constructed.

Preceded by Knights of Columbus Stadium	Home of the Orange A.C.- Orange/Newark Tornadoes; 1930	Succeeded by Newark Velodrome
Preceded by Knights of Columbus Stadium	Home of the Orange A.C.- Orange/Newark Tornadoes; 1937–1965	Succeeded by None
