= 1930 NFL season =

American football season

Regular season
- Duration: September 14 – December 14, 1930
- Champions: Green Bay Packers

NFL teams

The 1930 NFL season was the 11th regular season of the National Football League.

Prior to the season, Brooklyn bootlegger Bill Dwyer bought the Dayton Triangles, moved them, brought on former Orange Tornadoes star Jack Depler as a partner, and renamed them the Brooklyn Dodgers. With this move, the league was able to keep the final franchise from the Ohio League alive, albeit in a new location and with more skilled players, as it was unfeasible for the players in Dayton to move to Brooklyn during the Great Depression. The remains of the Tornadoes, with much of their roster now playing for the relocated Triangles-Dodgers franchise, moved to Newark.

The Portsmouth Spartans (now known as the Detroit Lions) joined the league, while the Buffalo Bisons and the Boston Bulldogs both folded.

The Green Bay Packers were named the NFL champions for the second consecutive year after they finished the season with the best record.

== Teams ==
The league had 11 teams in 1930.

First season in NFL *	Last active season ^

‡ Player/head coach George Gibson was one of the ten players that the Minneapolis Red Jackets sold to the Frankford Yellow Jackets after Minneapolis folded following a 1–7–1 start to the season. This enabled Gibson to also serve as player/head coach for Frankford for five games late in the season.

Team	Head coach(es)	Stadium
Brooklyn Dodgers	Jack Depler	Ebbets Field
Chicago Bears	Ralph Jones	Wrigley Field
Chicago Cardinals	Ernie Nevers	Comiskey Park
Frankford Yellow Jackets	Bull Behman (10 games) and George Gibson ‡ (5 games)	Frankford Stadium
Green Bay Packers	Curly Lambeau	City Stadium
Minneapolis Red Jackets ^	George Gibson ‡	Nicollet Park
New York Giants	LeRoy Andrews (15 games) and Benny Friedman (2 games)	Polo Grounds
Newark Tornadoes ^	Al McGall (3 games), Andy Salata, and Jack Fish (9 games)	Newark Schools Stadium
Portsmouth Spartans *	Hal Griffen	Universal Stadium
Providence Steam Roller	Jimmy Conzelman	Cycledrome
Staten Island Stapletons	Doug Wycoff	Thompson Stadium

== Championship race ==
Defending champion Green Bay won its first eight games, including a 14–7 home win over the New York Giants on October 4. By Week Nine, Green Bay was at 8–0–0 and New York right behind them at 10–1–0. On November 16, the Packers lost to the Cardinals 13–6, but in New York, the Giants fell to the Bears, 12–0. On November 23, a crowd of 37,000 turned out as the Packers and the Giants met at the Polo Grounds in New York. The Giants' 13–6 win in Week Eleven gave it the lead, 11–2–0 (.846) to the Packers' 8–2–0 (.800). Missed extra points had a big effect, as four days later, the Giants were beaten on Thanksgiving Day by Staten Island, 7–6, while Green Bay defeated Frankford 25–7 to retake the lead at 9–2–0 (.818) to New York's 11–3–0 (.785). The Giants faltered again on Sunday, November 30, when Brooklyn beat them 7–6, again on a missed point after.

In Week Thirteen, the Giants beat the Yellow Jackets, 14–6, while the Packers lost to the Bears, 21–0, cutting Green Bay's hold on first place to a mere 4/10ths of a percentage point, .769 to .765.

The Giants finished their season at 13–4–0, while 10–3–0 Green Bay had a final game at Portsmouth: a loss would have given the Packers a 10–4–0 finish and a .714 percentage, giving the Giants, at .765, the championship, while a tie (10–3–1 and .769) or win (11–3–0 and .785) would give Green Bay the 1930 title, their second in a row.

Once again, the point after decided the race. On December 14, the Packers scored on Red Dunn's touchdown pass to Wuert Engelmann, but the point after by Verne Lewellen failed, giving them a 6–0 lead. After Chuck Bennett ran for a touchdown for the Spartans, the extra point attempt by Tiny Lewis was blocked, and when the game ended, the 6–6 tie gave the Packers the 1930 title.

Had the current (post-1972) system of counting ties as half a win and half a loss been in place in 1930, the tie would have given the Giants (13–4–0, .765) the title, and Green Bay would have finished runner-up at .750.

== Standings ==
NFL standings
	W	L	T	PCT	PF	PA	STK
Green Bay Packers	10	3	1	.769	234	111	T1
New York Giants	13	4	0	.765	308	98	L1
Chicago Bears	9	4	1	.692	169	71	W5
Brooklyn Dodgers	7	4	1	.636	154	59	L1
Providence Steam Roller	6	4	1	.600	90	125	L1
Staten Island Stapletons	5	5	2	.500	95	112	L1
Chicago Cardinals	5	6	2	.455	128	132	L1
Portsmouth Spartans	5	6	3	.455	176	161	T1
Frankford Yellow Jackets	4	13	1	.235	113	321	T1
Minneapolis Red Jackets	1	7	1	.125	27	165	L6
Newark Tornadoes	1	10	1	.091	51	190	L6

Note: Tie games were not officially counted in the standings until 1972.
