= NYU Violets football =

Defunct football program representing New York University

- First season: 1873
- Last season: 1952
- Stadium: Yankee Stadium (capacity: 67,000)
- Location: New York City, New York
- NCAA division: Division III
- Conference: Independent
- Colors: Purple and white

The NYU Violets football team represented the New York University Violets in college football.

== History ==
NYU began play in 1873, making it one of the first football teams established in the United States (following Princeton, Rutgers, Columbia, Yale, and Stevens). Additionally, the current governing body for collegiate sports, the NCAA, was formed as the direct result of a meeting convened in New York City by NYU Chancellor Henry MacCracken in December 1905 to improve the safety of football.

Since beginning play in 1873, NYU football has had many football players earn recognition for their achievements, most notably 1928 All-American and future Hall-of-Famer Ken Strong. The most successful football coach in NYU history was Chick Meehan, who coached the team to seven successful seasons from 1925 to 1931. In 1939, head coach Mal Stevens led NYU to a 5–1 start and the program's only appearance in the AP Poll, before fading to a 5–4 final record. Additionally, the model for the Heisman Trophy is based on 1930s NYU football star Ed Smith. Despite some shining moments, however, Time magazine characterized NYU's overall football history as mostly "lean" in 1942, and NYU permanently dropped the sport as a varsity program after the 1952 season.

In the 1940 season, before a football game between NYU and Missouri in Columbia, Missouri, 2,000 NYU students protested against the "gentlemen's agreement" to exclude African-American athletes (at the University of Missouri's request). At the time, it was the largest protest ever against this practice.

However, in a process somewhat similar to what occurred with NYU's current conference rival Chicago Maroons, athletics were gradually deemphasized at NYU over the passing decades. The school terminated its intercollegiate football program in 1953. In 1971 the basketball program was abruptly dropped. In 1981, at the urging of then president John Brademas, NYU removed its remaining sports from NCAA Division I to Division III.

=== Stadiums ===
NYU used several locations for home games over their team's history, all within New York City.

- Berkeley Oval, The Bronx: 1899–1901
- Ohio Field, University Heights, The Bronx: 1890s–1966
- Yankee Stadium, The Bronx: 1926–1948
- Polo Grounds, Upper Manhattan: 1929–1931, 1936–1936, 1941, 1946
- Triborough Stadium, Randalls Island: 1951–1952
