= Staten Island Stapletons =

Defunct American football team

General information
- Founded: 1915
- Folded: 1935
- Stadium: Thompson Stadium
- Headquartered: Stapleton, Staten Island, New York City, New York, United States
- Colors: Blue, yellow

Personnel
- Owner: Dan Blaine
- General manager: Dan Daily
- Head coach: Al Neuschaefer (1925–1926); Harold Hansen (1927–1928); Daniel Daley (1929–1932); Doug Wycoff (1929–1930); Hinkey Haines (1931); Marty Brill (1931)

Team history
- Stapleton Football Club (1915–1920); Stapleton Ex-Service AC (1921); Staten Island Stapletons (1915–1931); Staten Island Stapes (1932–1935)

League / conference affiliations
- Independent (1915–1929); National Football League (1929–1932)

The Staten Island Stapletons, also known as the Staten Island Stapes, were a professional American football team. Founded in 1915, they played in the National Football League (NFL) from 1929 to 1932. The team was based in the Stapleton section of Staten Island. They played under the shortened nickname the "Stapes" the final two seasons.

Jack Shapiro, a blocking back for the Stapletons, was the shortest player in NFL history, weighing between 119–126 pounds (54–57 kg) and just over 5 feet (1.5 m) tall.

== Early years ==
The Staten Island Stapletons were founded in 1915 as a neighborhood team. The team was organized by Dan Blaine, who also served as the team's halfback. Blaine later became rich by building up a chain of restaurants. The Stapletons played similar semi-pro neighborhood teams from the New York City area. During those early years the Stapes played more for fun than money. Crowds were small and player salaries averaged $10 per game (equivalent to $318 in 2025). The team won several local semi-pro titles before World War I.

The team was inactive in 1918, due to Blaine's service commitment to the military and involvement in the war, and reactivated in 1919. By that time, he was the sole owner. He retired as a player in 1924 and continued as owner and manager of the team, commonly called the Stapes. They took the Thompson Stadium, a minor league park in the neighborhood that gave them their name, as their permanent home field. Today the stadium site is occupied by Stapleton Housing located between Broad, Hill and Warren Streets and Tompkins Avenue. Prior to moving into Thompson Stadium, the Stapletons played in two temporary local parks: Stapleton Field and East Shore Oval.

Between 1923 and 1924, Stapes manager Daniel Daley claimed the "New York Metropolitan championship" by beating the best independent pro teams in the area. In 1925, Tim Mara formed the New York Giants who moved into the Polo Grounds. Their presence in New York overshadowed the Stapes, particularly with the sell-out visit by Red Grange and the Chicago Bears on December 6, 1925. The Giants and Stapes began their New York rivalry on Thanksgiving Day 1925. The Giants defeated the Stapes in an exhibition game 7–0.

== Newark Bears takeover ==
Over the following couple of seasons, the Stapes would play exhibitions against pro teams from the NFL and various other leagues. On November 14, 1926, the Stapes were routed by the Newark Bears, 33–0. The Bears belonged to Red Grange's American Football League, which served as competitor to the NFL during the 1926 season. Unhappy with the defeat, Blaine promptly hired most of the Newark players, including star rookie Doug Wycoff, who were still owed money because the Newark owner was having financial problems. As a result, the Bears went out of business while the Stapletons benefited from Newark's folding. In 1928, Blaine further upgraded the team by signing some star players from New York University, like Frank Briante.

== Pre-NFL ==
In 1927, the Stapes fielded their ex-Newark Bears squad, although Wycoff signed with the Giants. The Giants would go on to win the 1927 NFL championship and defeated the Stapes twice in non-league games, 19–0 and 18–0. The Stapes though did manage to beat the NFL's Duluth Eskimos, featuring Ernie Nevers 7–6 on November 27, 1927. By 1928, Blaine wanted the Stapes to become an NFL franchise. He bolstered his squad by re-signing Doug Wycoff back as a player-coach and by signing six graduates from the nationally ranked New York University team. The Stapes had their best season on record, going 10–1–1, including a 3–1 record against NFL teams. They even pulled out a 7–0 victory over the Giants on Thanksgiving Day.

== NFL ==
After his team rolled up a 10–1–1 record in 1928, Blaine applied for an NFL franchise in 1929. He needed permission from Tim Mara, the owner of the Giants, because Staten Island was in Mara's exclusive territory. But Mara actually had an extra franchise. It had originally belonged to the Brooklyn Lions and had been given to Mara when the Lions folded in 1927, because they owed him money. Mara had then allowed the New York Yankees, owned by Grange's manager C. C. Pyle, to use the franchise when that team moved from the defunct AFL into the NFL. The Yankees went out of business after the 1928 season, so the franchise again went back to Mara and he passed those franchise's rights on to Staten Island.

Blaine promptly hired Ken Strong, who became a Stapletons Hall of Famer. Strong, who received All-American honors while at New York University, was a speedy, powerful runner who was also one of the best kickers of the era.

The Stapletons never had a winning season in the NFL. During its first NFL season in 1929, the team went 3–4–3, defeating the Dayton Triangles, Boston Bulldogs, and the Minneapolis Red Jackets. The team also managed to tie the Frankford Yellow Jackets once and Orange Tornadoes twice. The team improved to a 5–5–2 record in 1930. That season the Stapes managed to defeat the rival New York Giants 7–6, after a four-yard touchdown run from Doug Wycoff and an extra point kick from Strong.

In July 1931, the team's official name on the league records was changed from the Stapleton Football Club, Inc., to Staten Island Stapes. At this time, Doug Wycoff left the team to rejoin the Giants. In need of a coach, Blaine hired Hinkey Haines, who had played briefly for the Stapes in 1929. The Stapes opened at home by beating the Dodgers 9–7 before 7,000 fans. A week later at Ebbets Field, the Dodgers forced three interceptions to defeat the Stapes 18–6. The team posted a 4–6–1 record in 1931, defeating the Giants, Dodgers (twice), and the Cleveland Indians.

== Decline ==
In 1932, the Stapes finished last, defeating only the Giants and the Chicago Cardinals. Blaine was allowed by the NFL to suspend league play for the upcoming 1933 season. The team continued to lose money in 1933. While the team posted losses against the Giants, Dodgers, Portsmouth Spartans, and Green Bay Packers, it did manage to defeat the newly established Philadelphia Eagles. Doug Wycoff and Bob Campiglio stayed with the Stapes in 1933, but their star player Ken Strong signed with the Giants and helped them win the NFL's Eastern Division championship that season and the NFL league championship in 1934.

Blaine went through the formality of getting NFL permission to suspend league operations for the 1934 season. The team played one more season of semi-pro football in 1934 before quietly folding a year later. In June 1935, Blaine's franchise was finally declared forfeit. The franchise's failure can be blamed on a combination of the Great Depression and having too small of a stadium that could never accommodate enough fans to make the team profitable.

== Pro Football Hall of Famers ==
Staten Island Stapletons Hall of Famers
Players
No.	Name	Position	Tenure	Inducted
—	Ken Strong	HB/FB	1929–1932	1967

== Season-by-season ==
Year	W	L	T	Finish	Coach
1929	3	4	3	6th	Doug Wycoff
1930	5	5	2	6th	Doug Wycoff
1931	4	6	1	7th	Hinkey Haines, Marty Brill
1932	2	7	3	8th	Harold Hansen
