= 1927 Frankford Yellow Jackets season =

National Football League team season

- Head coach: Charley Moran, Russ Daugherty, Charley Rogers, Ed Weir, and Swede Youngstrom
- Home stadium: Frankford Stadium

Results
- Record: 6–9–3 NFL; 9–9–3 overall
- League place: 7th NFL

The 1927 Frankford Yellow Jackets season was their fourth in the National Football League. The team failed to improve on their previous output of 14–1–2, winning only six league games to finish in seventh place in the league standings.

During the 1927 season the Yellow Jackets played 7 sets of home-and-away back-to-back games — a unique scheduling idiosyncrasy. Always playing the home game first, Frankford was shut out on the back end of 5 of these 7 home-and-away pairings.

Thirteen of the 18 games played by the Yellow Jackets were home at Frankford Stadium.

== Schedule ==
Game	Date	Opponent	Result	Record	Venue	Attendance	Recap	Sources
–	September 18	at Atlantic City Shore Roses	W 3–0		Airport Field			
1	September 24	Dayton Triangles	L 3–6	0–1	Frankford Stadium	7,000	Recap	
–	October 1	All-New Britain	W 21–0		Frankford Stadium			
–	October 2	at All-New Britain	W 22–0					
2	October 8	Dayton Triangles	T 0–0	0–1–1	Frankford Stadium	4,000	Recap	
3	October 15	Buffalo Bisons	W 54–0	1–1–1	Frankford Stadium	5,000	Recap	
4	October 16	at Buffalo Bisons	W 23–0	2–1–1	Bison Stadium	1,500	Recap	
5	October 22	New York Giants	L 0–13	2–2–1	Frankford Stadium	9,000	Recap	
6	October 23	at New York Giants	L 0–27	2–3–1	Polo Grounds	15,000	Recap	
7	October 29	Providence Steam Roller	L 7–20	2–4–1	Frankford Stadium	5,000	Recap	
8	October 30	at Providence Steam Roller	L 0–14	2–5–1	Cycledrome	9,000	Recap	
9	November 5	Pottsville Maroons	W 10–0	3–5–1	Frankford Stadium	6,000	Recap	
10	November 6	at Pottsville Maroons	L 0–9	3–6–1	Minersville Park		Recap	
11	November 12	Cleveland Bulldogs	W 22–0	4–6–1	Frankford Stadium	6,000	Recap	
12	November 13	at Cleveland Bulldogs	L 0–37	4–7–1	Luna Park	5,000	Recap	
13	November 19	Chicago Cardinals	W 12–8	5–7–1	Frankford Stadium	6,000	Recap	
14	November 24	Green Bay Packers	L 9–17	5–8–1	Frankford Stadium	9,000	Recap	
15	November 26	Duluth Eskimos	W 6–0	6–8–1	Frankford Stadium		Recap	
16	December 3	Chicago Bears	T 0–0	6–8–2	Frankford Stadium	4,000	Recap	
17	December 4	at Chicago Bears	L 0–9	6–9–2	Wrigley Field	2,500	Recap	
18	December 10	New York Yankees	T 6–6	6–9–3	Frankford Stadium	7,000	Recap	
Note: Games in italics are against non-NFL teams. Thanksgiving Day: November 24.

== Standings ==
NFL standings
	W	L	T	PCT	PF	PA	STK
New York Giants	11	1	1	.917	197	20	W9
Green Bay Packers	7	2	1	.778	113	43	W1
Chicago Bears	9	3	2	.750	149	98	W2
Cleveland Bulldogs	8	4	1	.667	209	107	W5
Providence Steam Roller	8	5	1	.615	105	88	W3
New York Yankees	7	8	1	.467	142	174	L4
Frankford Yellow Jackets	6	9	3	.400	152	166	L1
Pottsville Maroons	5	8	0	.385	80	163	L1
Chicago Cardinals	3	7	1	.300	69	134	L1
Dayton Triangles	1	6	1	.143	15	57	L4
Duluth Eskimos	1	8	0	.111	68	134	L7
Buffalo Bisons	0	5	0	.000	8	123	L5

Note: Tie games were not officially counted in the standings until 1972.

== Players ==
- Carl Davis, end, tackle, guard
- Bill Donohoe, back
- Joey Maxwell, center, end
- Frank McGrath, end
- Dick Moynihan, fullback, blocking back
- Pete Richards, center
- Ned Wilcox, back
