= 1927 Duluth Eskimos season =

National Football League team season

- Owner: Ole Haugsrud
- Head coach: Ernie Nevers

Results
- Record: 1–8
- League place: 11th NFL

The 1927 Duluth Eskimos season was the Eskimos' final season in the NFL. The squad was a "travel team," playing all nine of their games on the road. Coached by Ernie Nevers, the Eskimos finished with a 1–8 record, scoring 68 points while allowing 134.

== Regular season ==
=== Schedule ===
Game	Date	Opponent	Result	Record	Venue	Attendance	Recap	Sources
1	October 9	at Green Bay Packers	L 0–20	0–1	City Stadium	4,000	Recap	
2	October 23	at Pottsville Maroons	W 27–0	1–1	Minersville Park		Recap	
3	October 30	at Cleveland Bulldogs	L 20–21	1–2	Luna Park	12,000	Recap	
4	November 6	at New York Giants	L 0–21	1–3	Polo Grounds	15,000	Recap	
5	November 13	at Providence Steam Roller	L 7–13	1–4	Cycledrome	7,500	Recap	
6	November 20	at Pottsville Maroons	L 0–6	1–5	Minersville Park		Recap	
7	November 26	at Frankford Yellow Jackets	L 0–6	1–6	Frankford Stadium		Recap	
8	December 3	at Cleveland Bulldogs	L 0–20	1–7	Luna Park		Recap	
9	December 11	at Chicago Bears	L 14–27	1–8	Wrigley Field	2,500	Recap	

== Standings ==
NFL standings
	W	L	T	PCT	PF	PA	STK
New York Giants	11	1	1	.917	197	20	W9
Green Bay Packers	7	2	1	.778	113	43	W1
Chicago Bears	9	3	2	.750	149	98	W2
Cleveland Bulldogs	8	4	1	.667	209	107	W5
Providence Steam Roller	8	5	1	.615	105	88	W3
New York Yankees	7	8	1	.467	142	174	L4
Frankford Yellow Jackets	6	9	3	.400	152	166	L1
Pottsville Maroons	5	8	0	.385	80	163	L1
Chicago Cardinals	3	7	1	.300	69	134	L1
Dayton Triangles	1	6	1	.143	15	57	L4
Duluth Eskimos	1	8	0	.111	68	134	L7
Buffalo Bisons	0	5	0	.000	8	123	L5

Note: Tie games were not officially counted in the standings until 1972.

=== Roster ===
- Marion Ashmore T
- Bunny Belden WB
- Pots Clark WB
- Fritz Cronin E
- Walt Kiesling G
- Chick Lang G
- Jimmy Manion G
- Jack McCarthy T
- Johnny Blood (McNally) HB
- Bill McNellis WB
- Russ Method WB
- Clem Neacy E
- Ernie Nevers FB
- Cobb Rooney BB
- Joe Rooney E
- Bill Rooney C
- Shanley T
- Bill Stein C
- Ray Suess G
