= Ernie Nevers =

American athlete and coach (1902–1976)

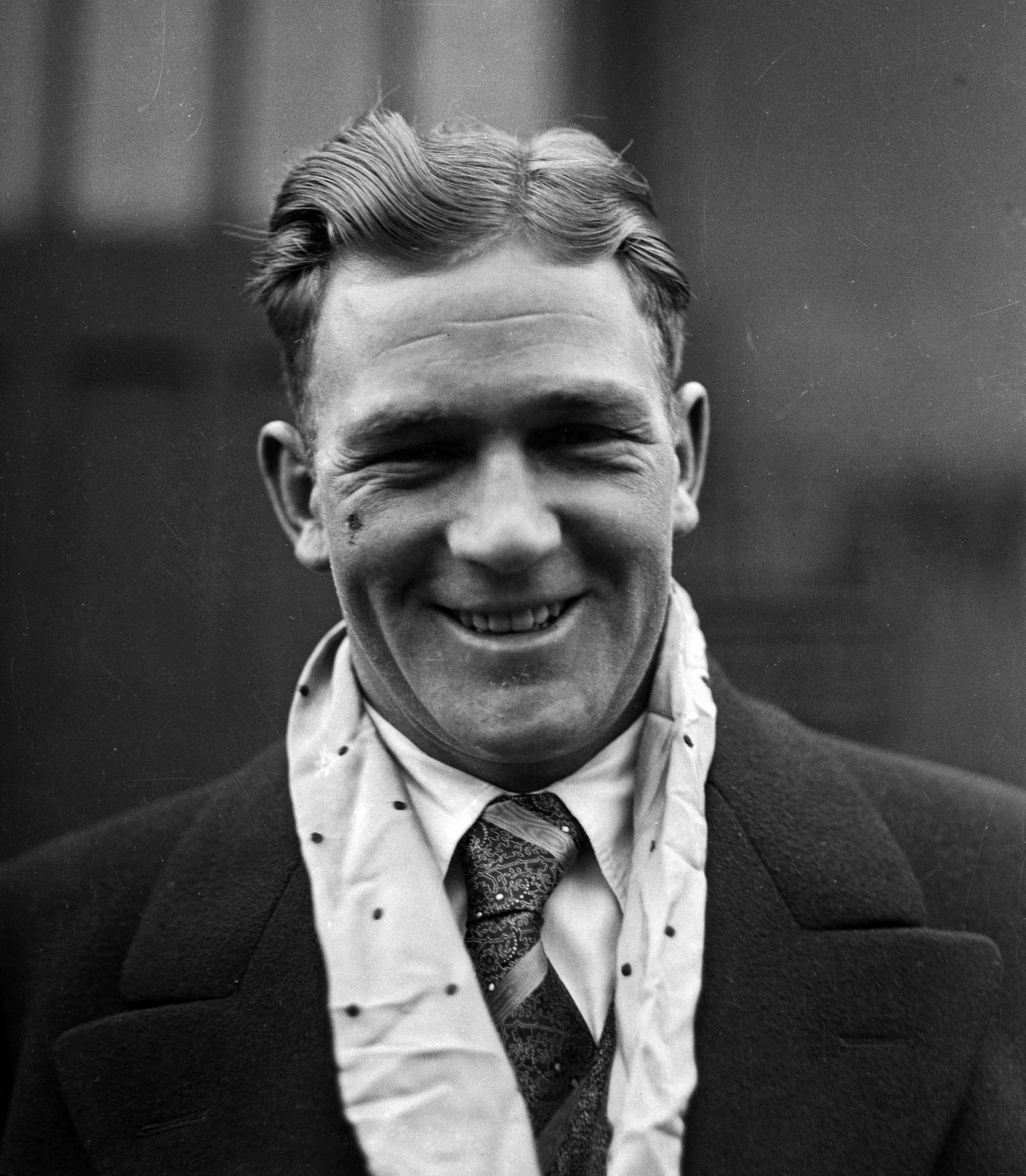
- Nevers, c. 1930s
- Born: Ernest Alonzo Nevers; June 11, 1902; Willow River, Minnesota, U.S.
- Died: May 3, 1976 (aged 73); Greenbrae, California, U.S.
- Title: Major - World War II Enlisted: 1942 (aged 40), Honorably Discharged 1945. Military Branches: United States Navy; United States Marine Corps. Service: Marine aviation units in the South Pacific including Bougainville and Green Island.
- Football career

No. 4, 11, 44
- Position: Fullback

Personal information
- Listed height: 6 ft 0 in (1.83 m)
- Listed weight: 204 lb (93 kg)

Career information
- High school: Superior Central (Superior, Wisconsin); Santa Rosa (Santa Rosa, California)
- College: Santa Rosa (1921–1922): Stanford (1922–1925)

Career history

Playing
- Duluth Eskimos (1926–1927); Chicago Cardinals (1929–1931)

Coaching
- Duluth Eskimos (1927) Head coach; Chicago Cardinals (1930–1931) Head coach; Stanford (1928, 1932–1935) Assistant coach; Lafayette (1936) Head coach; Iowa (1937–1938) Backfield & ends coach; Chicago Cardinals (1939) Head coach; Chicago Rockets (1946) Backfield coach

Awards and highlights
- 5× First-team All-Pro (1926, 1927, 1929–1931); NFL 1920s All-Decade Team; NFL 75th Anniversary All-Time Team; Arizona Cardinals Ring of Honor; Consensus All-American (1925); Third-team All-American (1923); 2× First-team All-PCC (1923, 1925); California Mr. Basketball (1921); Stanford Cardinal No. 1 retired; NFL records: Most points scored in a game: 40; Most rushing touchdowns in a single game: 6 (tied) (Note: Tied with Alvin Kamara)

Career statistics
- Rushing touchdowns: 38
- Points scored: 301
- Stats at Pro Football Reference

Head coaching record
- Career: NFL: 12–27–2 (.317); College: 1–8 (.111)
- Coaching profile at Pro Football Reference
- Pro Football Hall of Fame
- College Football Hall of Fame
- Baseball career
- Pitcher
- Batted: Right Threw: Right

MLB debut
- April 26, 1926, for the St. Louis Browns

Last MLB appearance
- May 4, 1928, for the St. Louis Browns

MLB statistics
- Win–loss record: 6–12
- ERA: 4.64
- Strikeouts: 39
- Saves: 2
- Stats at Baseball Reference

Teams
- St. Louis Browns (1926–1928)

Ernest Alonzo Nevers (June 11, 1902 – May 3, 1976), nicknamed "Big Dog", was an American professional football and baseball player and football coach. Nevers is widely regarded as one of the best football players in the first half of the 20th century. He played as a fullback and was a triple-threat man known for his talents in running, passing, and kicking. Nevers was inducted in the inaugural classes of inductees into both the College Football Hall of Fame in 1951 and the Pro Football Hall of Fame in 1963. He was also named in 1969 to the NFL 1920s All-Decade Team.

Nevers played four sports (football, basketball, baseball, and track and field) for Stanford University from 1922 to 1925 and was a consensus first-team All-American in football in 1925. He is accredited with inventing the hook shot in basketball, winning California Mr. Basketball in 1921, and was a two year starting forward for Stanford. Nevers also threw javelin for the track and field team, and played two years of varsity baseball before forgoing his senior year to pursue a football career.

He played professional football in the National Football League (NFL) for the Duluth Eskimos in 1926 and 1927 and the Chicago Cardinals from 1929 to 1931. In 1929, one week after defeating the Dayton Triangles, who were playing in their final game before moving to Brooklyn to embark on their long and tenuous history through the league, he set an NFL record that still stands by scoring 40 points in a single game. In the same game, he set another NFL record by scoring six rushing touchdowns in a single game against the Chicago Bears, a record that remained unequaled until the 2020 season in which New Orleans Saints running back Alvin Kamara also accomplished the feat, scoring six touchdowns against the Minnesota Vikings on Christmas Day. Nevers also played professional baseball as a pitcher for the St. Louis Browns of the American League from 1926 to 1928 and the Mission Bells of the Pacific Coast League (PCL) in 1928 and 1929.

Nevers also had a long career as a football coach, including stints with the Stanford Indians (assistant, 1928, 1932–1935), the Chicago Cardinals (head coach, 1930–1931, 1939), Lafayette Leopards (head coach, 1936), Iowa Hawkeyes (assistant, 1937–1938), and the Chicago Rockets (assistant, 1946).

== Early life ==
Nevers' parents, George and Mary Ann Nevers, were immigrants to the United States from New Brunswick, Canada. In addition to Ernie, they had five sons (Harry, Frank, John, George, and Arthur) and one daughter (Edith). By the time Nevers was born, the family had moved from New Brunswick to Willow River, Minnesota, where Nevers was born in 1902. The family moved again to Superior, Wisconsin, where Nevers grew up and attended Superior Central High School.

In 1920, the family moved to a ranch and fruit farm in the Rincon Valley section of Santa Rosa in Sonoma County, California. Nevers attended Santa Rosa High School for most of his senior year. He led the Santa Rosa football team by scoring 108 of the team's 170 points. After playing a majority of the basketball season for Santa Rosa, and eventually winning 1921 California Mr. Basketball, he returned to Wisconsin and the Superior Central basketball team on February 4. He graduated from Superior Central that spring in 1921.

== College career ==
=== Freshman years (1921–1923) ===
Upon graduation from high school, Nevers planned on attending the University of Wisconsin before a letter from his father persuaded him moved back to California. Nevers attended Santa Rosa Junior College for one year during the 1921–1922 academic year. He was the star of the school's football team and in a game against Petaluma, Nevers scored four touchdowns and kicked six extra points and a field goal. He also played baseball for Santa Rosa in the spring of 1922. In the fall of 1922, Nevers enrolled at Stanford University. He played for the freshman sports teams in the 1922–1923 academic year.

=== Sophomore year (1923–24) ===
As a sophomore, Nevers became a star for the 1923 Stanford varsity football team. He was described as "a sweet punter and a general all-around backfield star" and "the backbone of the Stanford offense."

In the final game of the 1923 season, the dedication game for California Memorial Stadium, Nevers gained more yards than the entire California team, even though Cal won the Big Game 9–0. After the game, the Los Angeles Times wrote: "The desperate drive of Ernie Nevers . . . will go down in history as one of the greatest individual efforts ever seen on a gridiron."

At the end of the 1923 season, Nevers was selected by the United Press as the first-team All-Pacific Coast fullback. He was also selected by Walter Camp as the third-team fullback on the 1923 College Football All-America Team.

After the 1923 football season was over, Nevers demonstrated his overall athletic ability by also starring for Stanford's basketball, baseball and track teams. He was rated as the Pacific coast's best player in both football and basketball, the best college pitcher, one of the leading track performers, and "a crack swimmer" as well. In April 1924, Stanford's assistant director of physical education, Harry Maloney, called Nevers "a freak genius" who also excelled in the classroom.

=== Junior year (1924–25) ===
As a junior, Nevers was sidelined for most of the football season after suffering two broken ankles. Under head coach Pop Warner, the 1925 Stanford football team won the Pacific Coast Conference championship with a 7–0–1 record in the regular season before losing to Notre Dame and the famous Four Horsemen backfield in the 1925 Rose Bowl. Five days after having a cast removed from one of his ankles, Nevers played all 60 minutes of the Rose Bowl, averaged 42 yards on his punts, and carried the ball 34 times for 114 yards, only 13 yards less than all the Four Horsemen combined.

Nevers again proved to be a multi-sport star, competing for Stanford's basketball and baseball teams in the winter and spring of 1925. A newspaper account from February 1925 stated that he was "pressing for honors as the best all around athlete in the annals of the west." During the summer of 1925, Nevers worked for the Starrett Meat Company in Guerneville, California, and pitched for the town's baseball team.

=== Senior year (1925) ===
As a senior, Nevers and Pop Warner led the 1925 Stanford football team to a 7–2 record. At the end of the 1925 season, Nevers was a consensus All-American, receiving first-team honors from, among others, the All-America Board, the Associated Press, Collier's Weekly, the International News Service, Liberty magazine, the Newspaper Enterprise Association, and Athlete & Sportsman magazine. He pursued a professional football career after the season, and did not play any other sport as a senior.

== Professional football and baseball player ==
=== Jacksonville All Stars ===
In December 1925, Nevers received between $25,000 and $35,000 to play professional football for a team in Jacksonville, Florida. Nevers' team played two exhibition games against NFL opponents: the Chicago Bears, led by Red Grange, on January 2, and the New York Giants on January 9. However, meager crowds forced the team to fold after only two games.

=== 1926 St. Louis Browns ===
After his first venture with professional football ended, Nevers joined the St. Louis Browns of Major League Baseball. He appeared in 12 games, 11 as a pitcher, for the 1926 Browns, compiling a 2–4 win–loss record and a 4.46 earned run average (ERA) in 74-2/3 innings pitched. At the plate, he had a .185 batting average in 27 at bats. Nevers threw the ball in an unusual underhand delivery. On August 13, 1926, in the highlight of Nevers' 1926 season, he pitched a complete game victory over the Detroit Tigers, giving up eight hits and two runs against a lineup that included Hall of Famers Ty Cobb, Heinie Manush, Charlie Gehringer, and Harry Heilmann, and Bob Fothergill who hit .367 that year.

=== 1926 Duluth Eskimos ===
In September 1926, Nevers left the Browns to play professional football for the Duluth Eskimos of the National Football League (NFL). Nevers' childhood friend Ole Haugsrud owned the Eskimos. The 1926 Eskimos, with a 16-man roster, played a 29-game schedule and compiled a 19–7–3 record. Nevers reportedly played 1,714 minutes out of a possible 1,740 minutes that year. Highlights of Nevers' 1926 season included the following:

- On September 19, 1926, in Nevers' first game for Duluth, the Eskimos played their only home game, defeating the Kansas City Cowboys, 7–0. Nevers scored the game's only touchdown, kicked the extra point, and was reportedly "here, there and everywhere performing in a triple threat role."
- On October 10, 1926, Nevers led the Eskimos to a 26–0 victory over the Hammond Pros. Nevers threw a touchdown pass to Joe Rooney and also scored a rushing touchdown.
- On October 17, 1926, Nevers threw a touchdown pass, scored a rushing touchdown, and kicked three extra points in a 21–0 victory over the Racine Tornadoes.
- On October 31, 1926, the Eskimos defeated the Milwaukee Badgers, 7–6. The Los Angeles Times described Nevers as "the whole show", noting that he threw a 35-yard touchdown pass to Rooney in the final five minutes and then kicked the extra point to give the Eskimos the victory.
- On November 11, 1926, Nevers scored all 13 Duluth points (two rushing touchdowns and an extra point) in a 14–13 loss to the New York Giants. Nevers' second touchdown was scored in the fourth quarter, but his kick for extra point to tie the game was blocked by Tillie Voss.
- On November 21, 1926, Nevers scored every point for the Eskimos in a 10–2 over the Canton Bulldogs. Nevers rushed for a touchdown and kicked a field goal and an extra point.
- On November 27, 1926, Nevers scored every point in a 16–0 victory over the Hartford Blues. He kicked three field goals, including one from placement at the 45-yard line, scored a touchdown, and kicked an extra point. After the game, The Hartford Daily Courant wrote: "The men of Nevers type must be depended upon to build professional football if it is to survive."

Out of the 29 games played by the Eskimos in 1926, 14 are considered official by the NFL; in those games, Nevers scored 71 points on eight touchdowns, 11 extra points, and four field goals. At the end of his rookie season, Nevers was a consensus pick for the fullback position on the 1926 All-Pro Team, receiving first-team honors from Collyer's Eye magazine, the Chicago Tribune, and the Green Bay Press-Gazette.

=== 1927 St. Louis Browns ===
Nevers returned to the St. Louis Browns in 1927. He appeared in 33 games for the team, 27 as a pitcher, and compiled a 3–8 win–loss record and a 4.94 ERA in 94 2/3 innings pitched and a .219 batting average in 32 at bats. He is often remembered for having given up two home runs to Babe Ruth during the 1927 season in which Ruth broke the major league record with 60 home runs.

=== 1927 Duluth Eskimos ===
In 1927, Nevers became head coach of the Eskimos in addition to his regular position at fullback. The 1927 Eskimos compiled a 1–8 record and finished in 11th place in the NFL. Highlights of Nevers 1927 season included the following:

- On October 23, 1927, Nevers completed 16 of 20 passes and threw four touchdown passes in a 27–0 victory over the Pottsville Maroons.
- On October 30, 1927, Nevers scored all 20 Duluth points on three touchdowns and two extra points in a 21–20 loss to the Cleveland Bulldogs.
- On November 13, 1927, Nevers ran 36 yards for a touchdown and kicked the extra point to account for Duluth's scoring in a 13–7 loss to the Providence Steam Roller.
- On December 11, 1927, Nevers threw two touchdown passes to Cobb Rooney and kicked two extra points to account for all 14 Duluth points in a 27–14 loss to the Chicago Bears.

After the season, Nevers was again selected by the Green Bay Press-Gazette, based on the results of a questionnaires sent to the league managers and reporters, as the first-team fullback on the 1927 All-Pro Team.

=== Mission Bells and Stanford football ===
Nevers career in Major League Baseball came to an end in the spring of 1928. In six games for the Browns, he compiled a 1–0 record and 3.00 ERA in nine innings pitched. His final major league appearance was on May 4, 1928, at age 25. Nevers was sold by the Browns for $7,500 to the Mission Bells, a Pacific Coast League baseball team in San Francisco, in late May 1928. He appeared in 35 games for the Reds in 1928, compiling a 14–11 record in 206 innings and batting .374 in 91 at bats. Nevers proved a draw for the Mission team, as Stanford fans and locals from Sonoma County flocked to see Nevers pitch.

In March 1928, Nevers announced that he would not return to professional football that fall, opting instead to serve as an assistant coach to Pop Warner at Stanford. Nevers said of professional football: "I hurt my back last year and don't care to take any more chances." He returned to Stanford in September 1928 as coach of the reserve football players.

In February 1929, Nevers resigned from his coaching job at Stanford to return to the Mission baseball club in the PCL. He appeared in 41 games during the 1929 season and compiled a 7–8 win–loss record.

=== Chicago Cardinals ===
==== 1929 season ====
Nevers (far right) carrying the ball during his 40-point game against the Bears

In the fall of 1929, Nevers returned to the NFL to play fullback for the Chicago Cardinals. Highlights of Nevers' 1929 season include the following:

- On November 6, 1929, he led the Cardinals to a 16–0 victory over the Providence Steam Roller in the first night game in NFL history; in that game, Nevers threw a 45-yard touchdown pass, kicked a 23-yard field goal, and ran for another touchdown.
- On November 24, 1929, Nevers scored all 19 points (three touchdowns and an extra point) in the Cardinals' 19–0 victory over the Dayton Triangles, who were playing in their final game before moving to Brooklyn to embark on their long and erratic history through the league.
- Four days later on November 28, 1929, Nevers set an NFL record for points scored by a player in a single game. Nevers scored all 40 points in the Cardinals' 40–6 victory over the Chicago Bears; in that game, Nevers scored six rushing touchdowns, which remained an unshared NFL record until Alvin Kamara also accomplished the feat on Christmas Day, 2020 against the Minnesota Vikings. Nevers also kicked four extra points in the same game.
- On December 1, 1929, in a narrow loss to the New York Giants, Nevers threw a touchdown pass, intercepted a Benny Friedman pass and returned it to the Giants' one-yard line, rushed for a touchdown, and kicked an extra point.
- On December 8, 1929, Nevers passed for two touchdowns, ran for a touchdown, and kicked two extra points in a 26–0 victory over the Orange Tornadoes.

At the end of the 1929 season, Nevers was a consensus pick as the fullback on the 1929 All-Pro Team, receiving first-team honors from the Green Bay Press-Gazette, based on the return of 16 ballots sent to the team owners, managers, and sports writers of clubs in the NFL, Collyer's Eye magazine, and the Chicago Tribune.

==== 1930 season ====
In 1930, Nevers returned to the Cardinals as both head coach and fullback. Highlights of his 1930 season included:

- On October 25, 1930, Nevers rushed for two touchdowns and kicked four extra points in a 34–7 victory over the Frankford Yellow Jackets.
- On October 26, 1930, Nevers accounted for all 23 points in a 23–13 victory over the Portsmouth Spartans. In that game, Nevers threw a 29-yard touchdown pass to Cobb Rooney, ran for two touchdowns, and kicked a field goal and two extra points. In a single weekend, with back-to back games against Frankford and Portsmouth, Nevers accounted for four rushing touchdowns, a passing touchdown, a field goal, and six extra points.
- On November 16, 1930, Nevers led the Cardinals to a 13–6 victory over the 1930 NFL champion Green Bay Packers. The victory broke the Packers' 22-game winning streak. Nevers threw a touchdown pass to Bunny Belden, ran for a touchdown, and converted one of two extra point attempts to account for all of the Cardinals' points.

At the end of the 1930 season, Nevers was again selected as the consensus first-team fullback on the 1930 All-Pro Team with Bronko Nagurski being picked for the second-team at the position.

==== 1931 season ====
Nevers returned to the Cardinals as fullback and head coach in 1931. Highlights of his seasons included:

- On November 1, 1931, Nevers led the Cardinals to a 14–7 victory over the Brooklyn Dodgers. Nevers averaged 52 yards on his punts in the game, threw a 23-yard touchdown pass to Kassell, rushed for a touchdown, and kicked two extra points.
- On November 15, 1931, the Cardinals defeated the Green Bay Packers, 21–13, giving the Packers their first loss of the year. Nevers threw two touchdown passes and kicked three extra points in the game. The Associated Press called it "one of [Nevers'] greatest exhibitions". The Packers went on to win the 1931 NFL championship.
- On November 22, 1931, Nevers ran for two touchdowns and kicked two extra points as the Cardinals defeated the Portsmouth Spartans, 20–19.
- In his final NFL game, played before a crowd of 1,500 at Wrigley Field on November 29, 1931, Nevers led the Cardinals to a 21–0 victory over the Cleveland Indians. Nevers accounted for every point scored in the game with a 44-yard touchdown pass to Malloy, two rushing touchdowns, and three extra points.

At the end of the 1931 season, Nevers was again selected (for the fifth time in five years in the NFL) as the fullback on the All-Pro Team, receiving first-team honors from the Green Bay Press-Gazette based on the returns of ballots sent to each club in the league as well as sports writers and officials, the United Press, and Collyer's Eye.

On January 25, 1932, Nevers broke his wrist on the final play of a charity football game in San Francisco. Afterward, Nevers announced his retirement as a player, stating that he was getting out while he was "still in one piece," and expressing a desire to pursue a career as a coach.

== Coaching career ==
In March 1932, Nevers was hired as an assistant coach under Pop Warner at Stanford. His initial assignment was to coach the "goof squad". At the end of the 1932 season, Warner resigned as Stanford's head coach, but Nevers remained as an assistant coach under Tiny Maxwell through the 1935 season. During that time, Stanford won three consecutive Pacific Coast Conference championships and played in the 1934, 1935, and 1936 Rose Bowls.

In January 1936, Nevers resigned his position at Stanford to accept the head coaching job at Lafayette College. Nevers was welcomed to the Easton, Pennsylvania, campus with a parade and street celebration as classes were suspended for the day and Lafayette students anticipated the school's "return to 'Big Time' position" of previous years. The 1936 Lafayette team compiled a 1–8 record.

In March 1937, Nevers resigned his post at Lafayette upon being appointed backfield and ends coach for the University of Iowa under head coach Irl Tubbs. Tubbs had been Nevers' high school football coach in Superior, Wisconsin. Nevers coached at Iowa for two years during which time the team compiled records of 1–7 in 1937 and 1–6–1 in 1938.

In December 1938, after the Chicago Cardinals had compiled a 2–9 record during the 1938 season, Nevers was hired as the team's head coach. The 1939 Cardinals compiled a 1–10 record. In February 1940, Nevers resigned from the Cardinals, saying he wished to reside permanently in San Francisco.

== Awards and honors ==
Nevers received numerous honors and awards during and after his playing career, including the following:

- In 1925, the football field at Santa Rosa High School was renamed Nevers Field in his honor.
- After Nevers left Stanford, his jersey (No. 1) was retired by the football program. It was Stanford's only retired number for more than 50 years until Jim Plunkett's number was also retired.
- In 1931, a committee of 12 leading football coaches led by Pop Warner met to determine the greatest football player of all time. Nevers finished in a tie with Red Grange for second place behind only Jim Thorpe. Warner actually picked Nevers first and noted: "Ernie Nevers played his position by far the best of any player I ever saw. He had a wonderful physique – was big and powerful yet very active. Nevers was the mental type every coach likes to have on his football team. He was a fine punter, a fine forward passer, a great line plunger and a marvel on defense. Ernie Nevers was a football player without fault."
- In April 1951, Nevers was selected as the fullback on the all-time All-America team selected in a nationwide poll by the Associated Press as part of the process to select nominees for the National Football Hall of Fame.
- In November 1951, Nevers was selected as one of the inaugural inductees for the National Football Hall of Fame (later renamed the College Football Hall of Fame).
- In 1962, he was selected by Sports Illustrated as the best college football player of all time.
- In 1963, Nevers was inducted into the Pro Football Hall of Fame as part of its charter class.
- In 1969, at the time of college football's centennial, Nevers was selected at fullback on college football's all-time All-America teams selected by the Football Writers Association of America (FWAA) and Football News. He was also named that same year to the National Football League 50th Anniversary All-Time Team.
- In 1979, Nevers was selected as one of the inaugural inductees (along with Willie Mays, Joe DiMaggio and Bill Russell) into the Bay Area Sports Hall of Fame.
- In 2003, he was honored by the United States Postal Service as one of four players (along with Red Grange, Walter Camp, and Bronko Nagurski) to be featured on a postage stamp as early gridiron heroes.
- In 2010, the NFL Network ranked Nevers 89th on its list of the 100 greatest players of all time.

== Family, military service, and later years ==
Nevers was married to Mary Elizabeth "Mae" Heagerty in February 1926 in San Francisco.

On August 20, 1938, Nevers served as an official for a golf match at Duluth, Minnesota, between blind golfers Clinton F. Russell of Duluth and Dr. W. H. I. Oxenham of England, both of whom had been featured in Ripley's Believe It or Not!.

In September 1942, Nevers enlisted at age 39 in the United States Marine Corps; he was given the rank of captain. In the spring of 1943, he was stationed at the Olds Gunnery School in Lansing, Michigan. While Nevers was stationed at a Marine base in Santa Barbara, California, his wife became ill with pneumonia; she died in a San Francisco hospital in July 1943. Nevers left for the South Pacific theater of World War II in October 1943. In April 1944, he was reported by the Associated Press to have been stationed for the past several months with a marine amphibious unit in the Pacific. In October 1944, Nevers returned to San Francisco after spending 10 months in charge of ground personnel with a squadron in the South Pacific. In December 1944, while stationed at Naval Station Treasure Island in San Francisco, Nevers was promoted to the rank of major. In February 1945, he became the athletic officer at the Marine Corps base in San Diego.

At the end of February 1945, Nevers agreed to serve as an assistant coach with the Chicago Rockets of the All-America Football Conference upon his discharge from the Marine Corps. As of mid-May 1945, Nevers was awaiting his discharge papers and had become associated with a trucking company pending the commencement of his coaching duties with the Rockets. Nevers ultimately served in the fall of 1946 as the backfield coach for the Rockets.

Nevers was remarried to Margery Luxem Railton of Chicago in February 1947. It was the second marriage for both. They had a daughter, Tina (born May 1948), Ernie Nevers also had a son, Gene Sullivan (born Aug 1947).

After retiring from football, Nevers lived in Strawberry and then Tiburon, both in Marin County, California, and worked in public relations and sales promotion for a wine association and a wholesale liquor company. In 1950, Nevers and his wife had a television show broadcast on Friday nights on KGO in San Francisco. In September 1954, Nevers began another television show known as "Out on a Limb With Ernie Nevers".

Nevers died in May 1976 at age 73 at Marin General Hospital in Greenbrae, California. Press accounts differed as to the cause of his death, one indicating that he had been suffering from a kidney disorder, and another saying he had been under treatment for a heart condition. He was buried at Mount Tamalpais Cemetery in San Rafael, California.

== Head coaching record ==
=== College ===
Year	Team	Overall	Conference	Standing	Bowl/playoffs
Lafayette Leopards (Middle Three Conference) (1936)
1936	Lafayette	1–8	0–1	T–2nd	
Lafayette:		1–8	0–1		
Total:		1–8			

=== NFL ===
Year	Team	Regular season					Postseason			
Year	Team	Won	Lost	Ties	Win %	Finish	Won	Lost	Win %	Result
1927	DUL	1	8	0	.111	11th in NFL	—	—	—	—
1930	CHC	5	6	2	.462	7th in NFL	—	—	—	—
1931	CHC	5	3	0	.625	4th in NFL	—	—	—	—
1939	CHC	1	10	0	.091	5th in NFL Western	—	—	—	—
Total		12	27	2	.317	N/A	—	—	—	

== See also ==
- Rudy Rintala
