= 1927 All-Pro Team =

Official list of the best NFL players in 1927

The 1927 All-Pro Team consists of American football players chosen by various selectors at the end as the best players at their positions for the All-Pro team of the National Football League (NFL) for the 1927 NFL season. Selectors for the 1927 season included the Green Bay Press-Gazette poll and the Chicago Tribune.

== Selectors and key ==
For the 1927 season, there are five known selectors of All-Pro Teams. They are:

GB = A poll conducted by the Green Bay Press-Gazette identified first and second teams. The selections were based on polling of league managers and reporters.

CT = The Chicago Tribune selected by Wilfrid Smith

JR = Jack Reardon, a game official from New York

LA = LeRoy Andrews, head coach of the Cleveland Bulldogs

RS = Ralph Scott, head coach of the New York Yankees. Scott chose separate teams of "power" (RS-P) and "clever" (RS-C) players.

Players selected by three of the five selectors as first-team All-Pros are displayed in bold typeface. Players who have been inducted into the Pro Football Hall of Fame are designated with a "†" next to their names.

== Selections by position ==
=== Ends ===
Player	Team	Selector(s)
**LaVern Dilweg**	Green Bay Packers	CT-1, GB-1, LA-1, RS-C
**Cal Hubbard**	New York Giants	GB-1, JR, RS-P
Ray Flaherty	New York Yankees	JR, RS-C
Carl Bacchus	Cleveland Bulldogs	CT-1
Chuck Corgan	New York Giants	LA-1
Tillie Voss	Chicago Bears	RS-P
Eddie Lynch	Providence Steam Roller	GB-2
George Kenneally	Pottsville Maroons	GB-2

=== Tackles ===
Player	Team	Selector(s)
**Bub Weller**	Chicago Cardinals	JR, RS-P
Gus Sonnenberg	Providence Steam Roller	GB-1
Ed Weir	Frankford Yellow Jackets	GB-1
Century Milstead	New York Giants	GB-2, CT-1
Joe Kozlowsky	Providence Steam Roller	CT-1
Duke Slater	Chicago Cardinals	GB-2, LA-1
Ed Healey	Chicago Bears	LA-1
Dick Stahlman	New York Giants	RS-C
Link Lyman	Chicago Bears	RS-C

=== Guards ===
Player	Team	Selector(s)
**Mike Michalske**	New York Yankees	CT-1, GB-1, RS-C
**Steve Owen**	New York Giants	GB-1, JR [T], LA-1, RS-P [T]
Jim McMillen	Chicago Bears	CT-1, RS-P
Jack Fleischman	Providence Steam Roller	JR
Harry Connaughton	Frankford Yellow Jackets	JR
Milt Rehnquist	Cleveland Bulldogs	GB-2, LA-1
Hec Garvey	New York Giants	RS-P
Al Nesser	New York Giants	RS-C
Al Graham	Dayton Triangles	GB-2

=== Centers ===
Player	Team	Selector(s)
**Clyde Smith**	Columbus Tigers	GB-1, LA-1, RS-C
**George Trafton**	Chicago Bears	GB-2, CT-1, JR, RS-P

=== Quarterbacks ===
Player	Team	Selector(s)
**Benny Friedman**	Cleveland Bulldogs	CT-1, GB-1, JR, LA-1, RS-C
Ben Jones	Chicago Cardinals	RS-P

=== Halfbacks ===
Player	Team	Selector(s)
**Paddy Driscoll**	Chicago Bears	CT-1, GB-1
**Verne Lewellen**	Green Bay Packers	CT-1, GB-1, JR, LA-1
Bill Senn	Chicago Bears	GB-2, LA-1
Tony Latone	Pottsville Maroons	RS-P
Wildcat Wilson	Providence Steam Roller	RS-P
Red Grange	New York Yankees	RS-C
Hinkey Haines	New York Giants	GB-2 [QB], RS-C
Eddie Tryon	New York Yankees	GB-2

=== Fullbacks ===
Player	Team	Selector(s)
**Ernie Nevers**	Duluth Eskimos	GB-1, JR [HB], LA-1, RS-C
Jack McBride	New York Giants	GB-2, CT-1, JR
Barney Wentz	Pottsville Maroons	RS-P
