= Phil White (American football) =

American football player (1900–1982)

- White c. 1925

No. 0
- Positions: Halfback, fullback

Personal information
- Born: May 17, 1900; Enid, Oklahoma Territory, U.S.
- Died: May 29, 1982 (aged 82); Oklahoma City, Oklahoma, U.S.
- Listed height: 6 ft 2 in (1.88 m)
- Listed weight: 210 lb (95 kg)

Career information
- High school: Anadarko (Anadarko, Oklahoma); Central (Oklahoma City)
- College: Oklahoma (1918–1920); Tennessee Docs (1922–1924)

Career history
- Kansas City Cowboys (1925); New York Giants (1925; 1927); Memphis Hurricanes (1928–1929)

Awards and highlights
- NFL champion (1927)

Career NFL statistics
- Rushing touchdowns: 6
- Receiving touchdowns: 1
- Defensive touchdowns: 1
- Stats at Pro Football Reference

Phillip Elmer White (May 17, 1900 – May 29, 1982) was an American football player and physician. He played college football for the Oklahoma Sooners from 1918 to 1920 and for the Tennessee Docs at University of Tennessee College of Medicine from 1922 to 1924. He led both the Sooners and the Docs to undefeated seasons and was selected as a first-team halfback on the 1920 All-America college football team. He played professional football in the National Football League (NFL) for the Kansas City Cowboys in 1925 and for the New York Giants in 1925 and 1927. He helped the 1927 Giants win the NFL championship.

After his football career ended, White worked as a physician in Oklahoma City for over 30 years. He lived in Oklahoma City until he died in 1982 at age of 82.

== Early life ==
Phillip Elmer White was born in Enid, Oklahoma Territory, on May 17, 1900. He graduated from Central High School in Oklahoma City in 1918.

== College football ==
=== Oklahoma ===
White played college football as a halfback for the Oklahoma Sooners from 1918 to 1920. He was a triple-threat player who led the team on offense, both as a passer and running with the ball, and as a punter as far as 65 yards. As a senior, he led the 1920 Oklahoma Sooners football team to an undefeated 6–0–1 record and the Missouri Valley Conference championship. At the end of the season, he was selected by the Newspaper Enterprise Association (NEA) as a first-team player on the 1920 All-America college football team.

While at the University of Oklahoma he studied pre-medicine and was a member of the Student Army Training Corps. He also lettered on the Oklahoma Sooners basketball team.

=== Tennessee Docs ===
After graduating from Oklahoma, White attended the University of Tennessee College of Medicine. While in medical school, he played at the fullback position for the Tennessee Docs football teams from 1922 to 1924. During his three years with the program, he led the Docs to records of 7–0–1 in 1922, 6–0–2 in 1923, and 9–1 in 1924. He was described by a teammate as "perhaps the greatest triple-threat player in the country during that period."

White was elected captain of the 1925 Tennessee Docs, but he was declared ineligible in early September as he had umpired professional baseball games in the Tri-State and Cotton State leagues during the summer.

After taking a break in his studies to play professional football, White graduated with his medical degree in 1929.

== Professional football ==
=== Kansas City Cowboys ===
White joined the Kansas City Cowboys of the National Football League in the fall of 1925 as both player and team manager. He was chosen as the Cowboys' captain, started eight games at halfback, and averaged 50 yards on punts. He also handled field goal kicking and led the Cowboys to a 3-0 victory over Duluth in the season opener with a field goal from the 50-yard line.

=== New York Giants ===
At the end of the 1925 season, White was optioned to the New York Giants and appeared in two games there. After spending the 1926 season away from the NFL, he returned to the Giants in 1927. Appearing in 11 games, he helped the 1927 Giants to an 11–1–1 and an NFL championship.

Smith appeared in a total of 21 NFL games, scoring 53 points on eight touchdowns, two extra-point kicks, and a field goal.

=== Memphis Hurricanes/Tigers ===
In 1928, White returned to Memphis to complete his medical studies and organized a semi-pro team known initially as the Memphis Hurricanes and later as the Memphis Tigers. He was the team's sole owner and also played halfback for the team. He also organized a basketball version of the Tigers in the winter of 1929.

== Life after football ==
White returned to Oklahoma City to work as an intern at St. Anthony Hospital. He opened a medical practice in the Medical Arts Building in 1930. He retired from medical practice in the early 1960s and died in Oklahoma City on May 29, 1982.
