= 1927 Buffalo Bisons (NFL) season =

National Football League team season

1927 Buffalo Bisons season
- Head coach: Dim Batterson

Results
- Record: 0–5
- Division place: 12th NFL

The 1927 Buffalo Bisons season was their eighth in the league. The team failed to improve on their previous output of 4–4–2, losing five games and winning none. They finished twelfth (last) in the league.

The "Buffalo/Texas Rangers" experiment from the previous season was discontinued (the city's cold weather was the primary reason) and the team reverted to the Bisons name. Previous head coach Jim Kendrick left the team for the New York Giants and Dim Batterson was named the new head coach.

Buffalo returned three key players from the 1926 squad — end Neely Allison, halfback Benny Hobson, and tackle Bones Irvin. This proved to be an insufficient basis for a competitive squad however, as the team was shutout in four of its first five games. The 1.6 points per game average stands as a near-record for poor offensive output.

The Bisons suspended operations five games into the season and would not return until 1929.

== Schedule ==
Game	Date	Opponent	Result	Record	Venue	Attendance	Recap	Sources
1	September 25	at Pottsville Maroons	L 0–22	0–1	Minersville Park		Recap	
2	October 2	at Providence Steam Roller	L 0–5	0–2	Cycledrome	3,500	Recap	
3	October 12	New York Yankees	L 8–19	0–3	Bison Stadium	3,500	Recap	
4	October 15	at Frankford Yellow Jackets	L 0–54	0–4	Frankford Stadium	5,000	Recap	
5	October 16	Frankford Yellow Jackets	L 0–23	0–5	Bison Stadium	1,500	Recap	

== Game summaries ==
=== Game 1: at Pottsville Maroons ===
Buffalo's season of pain began immediately with a 22–0 drubbing by the Pottsville Maroons. All points were scored in the first half, with the home team later reckoned to have "outplayed the Buffalo crew in every department." Pottsville's "flashy little quarterback" Dinty Moore was responsible for two of the team's touchdowns — a 10-yard run off-tackle early in the game and as the recipient of a long pass from halfback Frank Kirkleski off of a fumble recovery as the 15 minute opening frame was drawing to a close. A 40-yard field goal by Barney Wentz and a 21-yard touchdown pass from Kirkleskie to Vivian Hultman capped the scoring for the home team. Buffalo's best chance to score came in the fourth quarter off of a blocked punt that went out of bounds at the Pottsville 5-yard line, but the defense held for four downs and the Bisons were forced to surrender the ball.

=== Game 5: Frankford Yellow Jackets ===
Poor performance and financial losses associated brought an abrupt end to the 1927 Bisons season, with the team losing a reported $7,000 playing three games with the New York Yankees and the Frankford Yellow Jackets over a five day period, suffering a pummeling by the combined score of 96–0.

In the first Yellow Jackets game, played in Philadelphia on a Saturday due to Pennsylvania's blue laws prohibiting Sunday football, the Bisons were shellacked 54–0 in a game in which "not once did Buffalo make the slightest threat of scoring, netting exactly three first downs during the game."

== Standings ==
NFL standings
	W	L	T	PCT	PF	PA	STK
New York Giants	11	1	1	.917	197	20	W9
Green Bay Packers	7	2	1	.778	113	43	W1
Chicago Bears	9	3	2	.750	149	98	W2
Cleveland Bulldogs	8	4	1	.667	209	107	W5
Providence Steam Roller	8	5	1	.615	105	88	W3
New York Yankees	7	8	1	.467	142	174	L4
Frankford Yellow Jackets	6	9	3	.400	152	166	L1
Pottsville Maroons	5	8	0	.385	80	163	L1
Chicago Cardinals	3	7	1	.300	69	134	L1
Dayton Triangles	1	6	1	.143	15	57	L4
Duluth Eskimos	1	8	0	.111	68	134	L7
Buffalo Bisons	0	5	0	.000	8	123	L5

Note: Tie games were not officially counted in the standings until 1972.

== Roster ==
Starters

- LE - Allison
- LT - Harvey
- LG - Winick
- C - McArthur
- RG - McConnell
- RT - Irwin
- RE - Otte
- QB - Carr
- LHB - Snell
- RHB - Hobson
- FB - Houser

Reserves

- Watson - back
- Vedder - back

== Season summary ==
The Buffalo Bisons were outscored 123–8 in losing their first five games and abruptly terminated operations. League President Joe F. Carr expressed hope that Ernie Nevers' Duluth Eskimos would change their name and move to Buffalo to take up the Bills' banner for 1928. While this scenario was published in the Buffalo press, it was news to Ray Weil, Bisons' president and holder of the NFL's franchise for the city, who expressed hope for a new start for his Bisons in Buffalo in the coming year. Ultimately, neither Duluth nor Buffalo fielded an NFL team for the 1928 season.
