= Joe Rooney (American football) =

Canadian gridiron football player (1898–1979)

Profile
- Position: End / Tackle

Personal information
- Born: August 28, 1898; Saskatoon, Saskatchewan, Canada
- Died: March 4, 1979 (aged 80); St. Louis County, Minnesota, U.S.
- Listed height: 6 ft 0 in (1.83 m)
- Listed weight: 177 lb (80 kg)

Career history
- Duluth Kelleys (1923–1924); Rock Island Independents (1925); Duluth Eskimos (1926–1927); Pottsville Maroons (1928); Chicago Cardinals (1929)
- Stats at Pro Football Reference

Joe Rooney was one of three Rooney brothers starting for the NFL's Kelley-Duluth team in 1924.

Joseph Patrick Rooney (August 28, 1898 – March 4, 1979) was a Canadian-born American professional football player. After attending high school in Virginia, Minnesota, Rooney made his professional debut in the early years of National Football League (NFL) in 1923 for the Kelley–Duluth club. He played for the Kelleys, Duluth Eskimos, Chicago Cardinals, Pottsville Maroons and Rock Island Independents during his 7-year career.
