= Fritz Cronin =

American football player (1905–1969)

Fritz Cronin (June 29, 1905 – March 1969) was an American football player who played for the Duluth Eskimos of the National Football League.

Cronin was born in Lake City, Minnesota. He attended high school in Kenosha, Wisconsin. Cronin died in Manchester, New Hampshire.

== Career ==
Cronin was a member of the Eskimos during the 1927 NFL season, making his debut alongside four other players from California on October 9, 1927. He played at the collegiate level at Saint Mary's College.
