= Clem Neacy =

American football player (1898–1968)

- Born: July 19, 1898; Milwaukee, Wisconsin
- Died: March 19, 1968 (aged 69); Palos Verdes Estates, California
- Resting place: Wood National Cemetery; Milwaukee, Wisconsin
- Education: Colgate University; University of Wisconsin–Milwaukee; Rush Medical College
- Football career

No. 26, 33
- Positions: End, tackle

Personal information
- Listed height: 6 ft 3 in (1.91 m)
- Listed weight: 206 lb (93 kg)

Career information
- High school: Milwaukee (WI) South Division
- College: Colgate

Career history
- Milwaukee Badgers (1924–1926); Duluth Eskimos (1927); Chicago Bears (1927); Chicago Cardinals (1928)
- Stats at Pro Football Reference

Clement Francis "Clem" Neacy (July 18, 1898 – March 19, 1968) was an American football end and tackle in the National Football League. He played professionally for the Milwaukee Badgers, Duluth Eskimos, Chicago Bears, and the Chicago Cardinals.

== Early life ==
Neacy was born in Milwaukee, Wisconsin. He played college football at Colgate University and the University of Wisconsin–Milwaukee. He graduated from Colgate University in 1924,

== Professional career ==
In 1924, he began playing in the NFL with the Milwaukee Badgers. He played five seasons in the NFL, playing his last game with the Milwaukee Badgers in 1928.

In 1930, Neacy played for the Milwaukee Nighthawks, an American football team trying to become part of the NFL franchise. In 1931, the team ended and Neacy retired from professional football.

== Life after the NFL ==
Neacy graduated from Rush Medical College in 1930, and became a surgeon with the Veterans Administration. He worked at the National Home for Disabled Volunteer Soldiers in Milwaukee, the Veterans Administration Hospital in Togus and the Wood Veterans Hospital in Milwaukee.

Neacy died in Palos Verdes Estates, California on March 19, 1968, and is interred at the Wood National Cemetery in Milwaukee.

== See also ==
- List of Chicago Bears players
