= Chick Lang (American football) =

American football player (1901–1976)

Profile
- Position: Tackle

Personal information
- Born: October 3, 1901; Fort William, Scotland
- Died: October 25, 1976 (aged 75); Mount Aukum, California
- Listed weight: 195 lb (88 kg)

Career information
- High school: Harrison Technical (Chicago)

Career history
- Duluth Eskimos (1927); Chicago Cardinals (1929)

Career statistics
- Games: 5
- Stats at Pro Football Reference

James H. Lang (October 3, 1901 – October 25, 1976) was an American football player.

Lang was born in Fort William, Scotland, in 1901. He moved to the United States in his youth and attended Harrison Technical High School in Chicago.

Lang played professional football in the National Football League (NFL) as a tackle for the Duluth Eskimos during the 1927 season and for the Chicago Cardinals during the 1929 season. He appeared in a total of five NFL games, three of them as a starter.

Lang died at Mount Aukum, California, in 1976 at age 75.
