= Marion Ashmore =

American football player (1899–1948)

Profile
- Position: Tackle

Personal information
- Born: July 9, 1899; Ashmore, Illinois, U.S.
- Died: February 26, 1948 (aged 48); Aberdeen, Washington, U.S.
- Listed height: 6 ft 0 in (1.83 m)
- Listed weight: 215 lb (98 kg)

Career information
- High school: J. M. Weatherwax (Aberdeen, Washington)
- College: Gonzaga (1920–1923)

Career history
- Milwaukee Badgers (1926); Duluth Eskimos (1927); Green Bay Packers (1928–1929)

Awards and highlights
- NFL champion (1929); Chicago Tribune 2nd Team All-NFL (1928)

Career NFL statistics
- Games played: 39
- Stats at Pro Football Reference

Marion Charles Ashmore (born Roger Marion Ashmore) (July 9, 1900 – February 26, 1948) was a player in the National Football League. He played his first two seasons with the Milwaukee Badgers and the Duluth Eskimos before playing his final two with the Green Bay Packers.
