= Neely Allison =

American football player (1902–1970)

No. 7, 17, 11
- Position: End

Personal information
- Born: May 14, 1902; Ballinger, Texas, U.S.
- Died: February 21, 1970 (aged 67); Houston, Texas, U.S.
- Listed height: 6 ft 0 in (1.83 m)
- Listed weight: 190 lb (86 kg)

Career information
- High school: Denton (TX)
- College: Texas A&M

Career history
- Buffalo Bisons/Rangers (1926–1927); New York Giants (1928)
- Stats at Pro Football Reference

James Neely Allison (May 14, 1902 – February 21, 1970) was an American football player in the National Football League (NFL).

== Life ==
Born in Ballinger, Texas, Allison played college football for the Texas A&M Aggies. He played professionally for the Buffalo Rangers (1926), the Buffalo Bisons (1927), and the New York Giants (1928). Allison played as an end and wore number 11. Allison scored one touchdown in 1926.
