= 1927 Green Bay Packers season =

NFL team season

- Head coach: Curly Lambeau
- Home stadium: City Stadium

Results
- Record: 7–2–1
- League place: 2nd NFL

The 1927 Green Bay Packers season was their ninth season overall and their seventh season in the National Football League. The team finished with a 7–2–1 record under player/coach Curly Lambeau earning them a second-place finish.

== Background ==
After a financially catastrophic 1926 season for many of the National Football League's 22 franchises, league president Joe F. Carr and many of the circuit's best established teams looked to contract in 1927. The league's fairly minimal franchise fee had allowed the size of the league to become unwieldy, it was believed, with the potential of cancelled games by financial weak sister franchises threatening the viability of the schedule and the future of the league.

In January 1927, an owners' meeting was held in New York City at which tentative plans were made to reorganize the NFL into two classes, "A" and "B", with weaker teams relegated to the second division.

Meeting on April 20 in the offices of the Green Bay Press Gazette, officers and directors of the Green Bay Football Corporation came together with key business leaders and boosters and decided to commit to the NFL's new financial requirements necessary to ensure a "Class A Division" berth. Such a mandate was issued to the club's representatives to the meeting scheduled in Cleveland for the coming weekend to formalize this proposed restructuring.

Instead of a two-class system for 1927, assembled league owners in a closed door meeting decided to dispense with financially floundering clubs entirely. Financially unstable teams were given the choice of terminating their association with the league or suspending operations until the franchise could be sold. Any franchise not sold or reactivated by July 7, 1928, would have its charter unilaterally terminated.

For 1927, the NFL would require its franchises to host no fewer than four home games, each with a guarantee of $3,000 paid out to the visiting club. The league also upped its "guarantee fund" to insure against default from $1,500 to $2,500 per club, payable as a certified check at the forthcoming July scheduling meeting. As a result of these more stringent financial requirements imposed upon already struggling teams, the ranks of the NFL plummeted from 22 to 12 teams for 1927 — a drop far more severe than the planned attenuation to around 16 clubs.

However, due to Green Bay team officials' foresight in building local enthusiasm and shoring up financial commitments, the small-market Packers would remain part of this reorganized NFL in 1927, unlike their regional counterpart in Milwaukee.

== Schedule ==
Game	Date	Opponent	Result	Record	Venue	Attendance	Recap	Sources
1	September 18	Dayton Triangles	W 14–0	1–0	City Stadium	3,600	Recap	
2	September 25	Cleveland Bulldogs	W 12–7	2–0	City Stadium	4,500	Recap	
3	October 2	Chicago Bears	L 6–7	2–1	City Stadium	5,500+	Recap	
4	October 9	Duluth Eskimos	W 20–0	3–1	City Stadium	4,000	Recap	
5	October 16	Chicago Cardinals	W 13–0	4–1	City Stadium	4,500	Recap	
6	October 23	New York Yankees	W 13–0	5–1	City Stadium	11,000	Recap	
7	November 6	at Chicago Cardinals	T 6–6	5–1–1	Normal Park	3,500	Recap	
8	November 13	Dayton Triangles	W 6–0	6–1–1	City Stadium	2,500	Recap	
9	November 20	at Chicago Bears	L 6–14	6–2–1	Wrigley Field	6,000	Recap	
10	November 24	at Frankford Yellow Jackets	W 17–9	7–2–1	Frankford Stadium	9,000	Recap	
Note: November 24: Thanksgiving Day.

== Game summaries ==
=== Game 3: Chicago Bears ===
In a Sunday confrontation deemed a "battle royal," Green Bay's Dick O'Donnell of Green Bay snagged a long pass for the first big play of the day. Controversy ensued, however. Next "Dunn shot a pass to Lewellen and it looked very much as if he were a victim of interference as he tried to grab the ball for a touchdown," the representative of the Green Bay Press-Gazette recounted. "The officials ruled the other way, however, and the Bears scrimmaged on their 20-yard line." The football rule that an incomplete forward pass in the end zone resulted in a touchback had bitten the home team hard. The Bears made effective use of their power running game in the second stanza, with reserve right halfback Bill Senn capping the climax of a long drive with a 1 yard plunge. Paddy Driscoll booted the all-important extra-point to give the Bears a 7–0 lead. The Packers' made their bid in the fourth quarter when player-coach Curly Lambeau hit on a 30 yard catch-and-run to end Lavvie Dilweg, which put the ball on the Chicago 30. Another 15 yard strike from Lambeau to Dilweg halved the distance to the end zone, although "the Bears tried to take the ball away from Dilweg and a near riot was averted." Then Dunn hit Lambeau with a pass for an apparent score, only to have it called back for violation of another rule of the day, that all passes must be thrown from at least five yards behind the line of scrimmage. The Packers were undaunted, with Dilweg making a great catch of a Dunn pass to take the ball down to the 2-yard line. Lewellen took two tries to punch the ball through to paydirt. "Joy reined supreme in the Packer camp but not for long however as Purdy, who substituted for Dunn, failed to come even close to making the extra point which would have given the Packers a tie game." A subsequent onside kick attempt failed and the Bears ran out the clock for a 7–6 victory. The Bears made extensive use of substitutes in the contest, with player-coach George Halas sending in capable replacements at key intervals to keep his best players fresh, using a noteworthy 24 players on the day.

== Standings ==
NFL standings
	W	L	T	PCT	PF	PA	STK
New York Giants	11	1	1	.917	197	20	W9
Green Bay Packers	7	2	1	.778	113	43	W1
Chicago Bears	9	3	2	.750	149	98	W2
Cleveland Bulldogs	8	4	1	.667	209	107	W5
Providence Steam Roller	8	5	1	.615	105	88	W3
New York Yankees	7	8	1	.467	142	174	L4
Frankford Yellow Jackets	6	9	3	.400	152	166	L1
Pottsville Maroons	5	8	0	.385	80	163	L1
Chicago Cardinals	3	7	1	.300	69	134	L1
Dayton Triangles	1	6	1	.143	15	57	L4
Duluth Eskimos	1	8	0	.111	68	134	L7
Buffalo Bisons	0	5	0	.000	8	123	L5

Note: Tie games were not officially counted in the standings until 1972.
