= 1927 Pottsville Maroons season =

National Football League team season

- Head coach: Dick Rauch
- Home stadium: Minersville Park

Results
- Record: 7–8 Overall; 5–8 NFL
- League place: 8th NFL

The 1927 Pottsville Maroons season was their third in the league. The team failed to improve on their previous league output of 10–2–2, winning only five games. They finished eighth in the league standings.

== Schedule ==
Game	Date	Opponent	Result	Record	Venue	Attendance	Recap	Sources
–	September 25	Shenandoah Red Jackets	W 14–0		Minersville Park			
1	September 25	Buffalo Bisons	W 22–0	1–0	Minersville Park		Recap	
2	October 2	at Chicago Cardinals	L 7–19	1–1	Normal Park	2,000	Recap	
3	October 9	New York Giants	L 0–19	1–2	Minersville Park	5,000	Recap	
4	October 16	at Providence Steam Roller	W 6–3	2-2	Cycledrome	7,500	Recap	
5	October 23	Duluth Eskimos	L 0–27	2–3	Minersville Park		Recap	
6	October 30	at New York Giants	L 0–16	2–4	Polo Grounds	20,000	Recap	
7	November 5	at Frankford Yellow Jackets	L 0–10	2–5	Frankford Stadium	6,000	Recap	
8	November 6	Frankford Yellow Jackets	W 9–0	3–5	Minersville Park		Recap	
9	November 11	New York Yankees	L 12–19	3–6	Minersville Park		Recap	
10	November 13	at Chicago Bears	L 12–30	3–7	Wrigley Field	8,000	Recap	
11	November 20	Duluth Eskimos	W 6–0	4–7	Minersville Park		Recap	
12	November 24	Providence Steam Roller	W 6–0	5–7	Minersville Park	4,000	Recap	
–	November 27	Coaldale Big Green	W 58–0		Minersville Park			
13	December 4	at Providence Steam Roller	L 0–20	5–8	Cycledrome	1,500	Recap	
Note: Thanksgiving Day: November 24.

== Game summaries ==
=== Week 1: Buffalo Bisons ===
The Pottsville Maroons got the 1927 season off to a resounding start with an easy 22–0 victory over the visiting Buffalo Bisons. All points were scored in the first half, with the home team later reckoned to have "outplayed the Buffalo crew in every department." Pottsville's "flashy little quarterback," Dinty Moore was responsible for two of the team's touchdowns — a 10-yard run off-tackle early in the game and as the recipient of a long pass from halfback Frank Kirkleski off of a fumble recovery as the 15 minute opening frame was drawing to a close. A 40-yard field goal by Barney Wentz and a 21-yard touchdown pass from Kirkleskie to Vivian Hultman capped the scoring for the home team. Buffalo's best chance to score came in the fourth quarter off of a blocked punt that went out of bounds at the Pottsville 5-yard line, but the defense held for four downs and the Bisons were forced to surrender the ball.

== Standings ==
NFL standings
	W	L	T	PCT	PF	PA	STK
New York Giants	11	1	1	.917	197	20	W9
Green Bay Packers	7	2	1	.778	113	43	W1
Chicago Bears	9	3	2	.750	149	98	W2
Cleveland Bulldogs	8	4	1	.667	209	107	W5
Providence Steam Roller	8	5	1	.615	105	88	W3
New York Yankees	7	8	1	.467	142	174	L4
Frankford Yellow Jackets	6	9	3	.400	152	166	L1
Pottsville Maroons	5	8	0	.385	80	163	L1
Chicago Cardinals	3	7	1	.300	69	134	L1
Dayton Triangles	1	6	1	.143	15	57	L4
Duluth Eskimos	1	8	0	.111	68	134	L7
Buffalo Bisons	0	5	0	.000	8	123	L5

Note: Tie games were not officially counted in the standings until 1972.
