= Bill Brennan (umpire) =

American baseball umpire

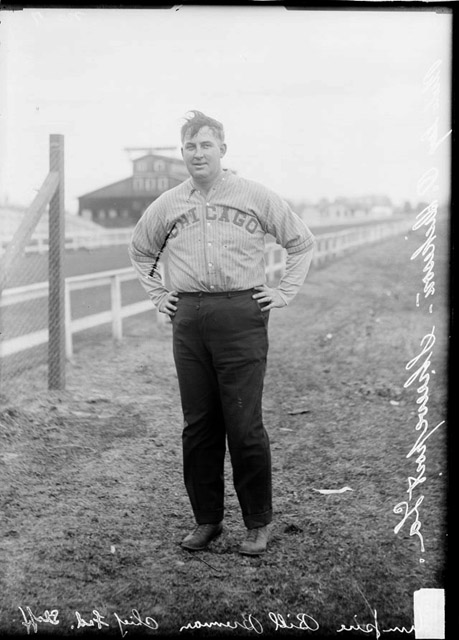
- Brennan as a Federal League umpire in 1914
- Born: William Thomas Brennan; October 25, 1880; Saint Paul, Minnesota, U.S.
- Died: September 13, 1933 (aged 52); Knoxville, Tennessee, U.S.
- Occupation: Umpire
- Years active: 1909–1913, 1921 (NL), 1914–1915 (FL)
- Employer(s): National League, Federal League

William Thomas Brennan (October 25, 1880 – September 13, 1933) was an American Major League Baseball umpire and college football coach. Brennan umpired in the National League (NL) from 1909 through 1913. He worked in the Federal League in 1914 and 1915. Following several years of umpiring in the minor leagues with the American Association and the Southern Association, he returned to the National League for 1921. He retired with 1093 major league games umpired. He umpired in the 1911 World Series.

== Umpiring career ==
Brennan began umpiring in the Northern League. He spent 1906 and 1907 in the Western League. The next year he umpired in the Wisconsin–Illinois League before his promotion to the NL in 1909. In 1912, Philadelphia club owner Horace Fogel charged that Brennan and other umpires had treated his team unfairly in postseason play. Brennan brought a civil suit against Fogel over the accusations. The suit was later dropped. After an investigation, Fogel was banned from ever representing an NL team.

He joined the upstart Federal League in 1914 and 1915, supervising the league's umpiring staff. After the league folded, Brennan found it difficult to regain a major league job. He umpired in the Southern Association for several years. He spent the 1921 season in the National League before returning to the Southern Association.

== Football coaching career ==
Brennan coached football at several levels both before and after his MLB umpiring days. He coached high school football in Saint Paul, Minnesota between 1901 and 1904, at Mechanics Arts High School in 1901 and 1902 and Central High School in 1903 and 1904. He led a professional team in 1905 and 1906 before returning to high school football in 1907. Brennan was the head football coach at Saint John's University in Collegeville, Minnesota in 1908 and 1909. He was away from football for a few years before taking an assistant coaching position at Tulane University in 1919 under Clark Shaughnessy. He spent several seasons at Tulane and later coached at the University of Tennessee at Memphis and Little Rock Junior College.

== Death ==
On Sunday, September 10, 1933, Brennan umpired the final game of the Southern Association season between Chattanooga and Knoxville. He had emergency surgery for a ruptured ulcer the next day at a Knoxville hospital. Brennan died there on September 13.

== Head coaching record ==
Year	Team	Overall	Conference	Standing	Bowl/playoffs
Saint John's Johnnies (Independent) (1908–1909)
1908	Saint John's	3–3			
1909	Saint John's	1–3			
Saint John's:		4–6			
Tennessee Docs (Independent) (1922–1925)
1922	Tennessee Docs	7–0–1			
1923	Tennessee Docs	6–0–2			
1924	Tennessee Docs	9–1			
1925	Tennessee Docs	5–5			
Tennessee Docs:		27–6–3			
Total:		31–12–3			
