= Dim Batterson =

American football player and coach (1881–1935)

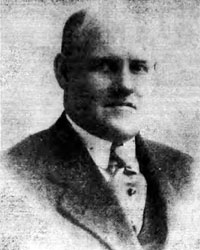

Biographical details
- Born: October 3, 1881; Buffalo, New York, U.S.
- Died: December 3, 1935 (aged 54); Buffalo, New York, U.S.

Playing career
- 1899–1901: Oakdales
- Position: Fullback

Coaching career (HC unless noted)
- 1899–1901: Oakdales
- c. 1920: Fosdick-Masten Park HS (NY)
- 1922: Buffalo
- 1925–1926: Buffalo Bisons/Rangers (assistant)
- 1927: Buffalo Bisons

Head coaching record
- Overall: 1–5 (college); 0–5 (NFL)

George Wilder "Dim" Batterson (Note: A few sources have Batterson's name spelled as "Dim Patterson" with a P; this is a mistake. The mistake likely stems from confusion with Warren D. Patterson, a Buffalo area shoe salesman who, at the time, was part-owner, general manager, and president of the Buffalo Bisons. Other sources list his name as "Jim Batterson" with a J; this is also a mistake. This most likely stems from confusion over his "Dim" nickname.) (October 3, 1881 – December 3, 1935) was American football coach for high school, college and professional teams. Batterson's ability to turn out players of All-American ability and knack of moulding Harvard Cup championship eleven at Masten Park high school in Buffalo, New York earned him the distinction of being one of the most astute scholastic coach in western New York state history.

== Playing days ==
At the turn of the century, in 1899, 1900 and 1901, Batterson coached and played fullback for the Oakdales, a semi-pro football club from South Buffalo, New York. During that time, he was considered one of the greatest backfield men in upstate New York. Besides the Oakdales, he played with the Elmwoods, Manhattan Athletic club, Erie Athletic club, and the Pittsburgh, Detroit and Toledo professional teams. Around 1905, Batterson played for the Buffalo All-Stars, an early semi-pro football team, who would later evolve into the Buffalo All-Americans-Rangers-Bisons franchise.

== Coaching career ==
Batterson started his coaching career at the high school level. He won four Buffalo City High School Championships (called Harvard Cups) while coaching at Masten Park High School including three consecutive in 1918, 1919 and 1920.

Batterson left the high school ranks in 1922 to become the football coach at the University at Buffalo. He lasted one year at the University winning only one game.

Batterson then coached with the Buffalo Bisons and Rangers of the early National Football League. Batterson was first brought onto the team as an assistant coach by his former student at Masten Park High, Walter Koppisch, in 1925, and he stayed in that position in 1926. He was named the team's head coach at the start of the 1927 NFL season and was the first head coach in the team's history not to be a player-coach. Unfortunately, the 1927 season was a disaster. Financial woes plagued the team from the start. The team lost 5 consecutive starts, bowing to Pottsville, 22 to 0; Providence, 5 to 0; New York Yankees, 19 to 8 and Frankford Yellowjackets twice, 54 to 0 and 23 to 0. After the 5th straight humiliating defeat, Batterson resigned and the team disbanded. Batterson never coached in the NFL again leaving his career coaching record at 0 won, five lost (0–5).

== Later years and honors ==
After retiring from coaching, Batterson was in the real estate business in the Buffalo suburb of Tonawanda, New York. He died at the age of 51 on December 5, 1935, in Buffalo General Hospital due to complications from a hernia surgery.

He was elected to Harvard Cup Hall of Fame in 2002.

== Head coaching record ==
=== College ===
Year	Team	Overall	Conference	Standing	Bowl/playoffs
Buffalo Bisons (Independent) (1922)
1922	Buffalo	1–5			
Buffalo:		1–5			
Total:		1–5			

=== Professional ===
Team	Year	Regular season					Postseason			
Team	Year	Won	Lost	Ties	Win %	Finish	Won	Lost	Win %	Result
BUF	1927	0	5	0	.000	12th in NFL	–	–	–	–
BUF Total		0	5	0	.000		–	–	–	–
NFL Total		0	5	0	.000		–	–	–	–
Total		0	5	0	.000		–	–	–	–
