= Frank McGrath (American football) =

American football player (1904–1990)

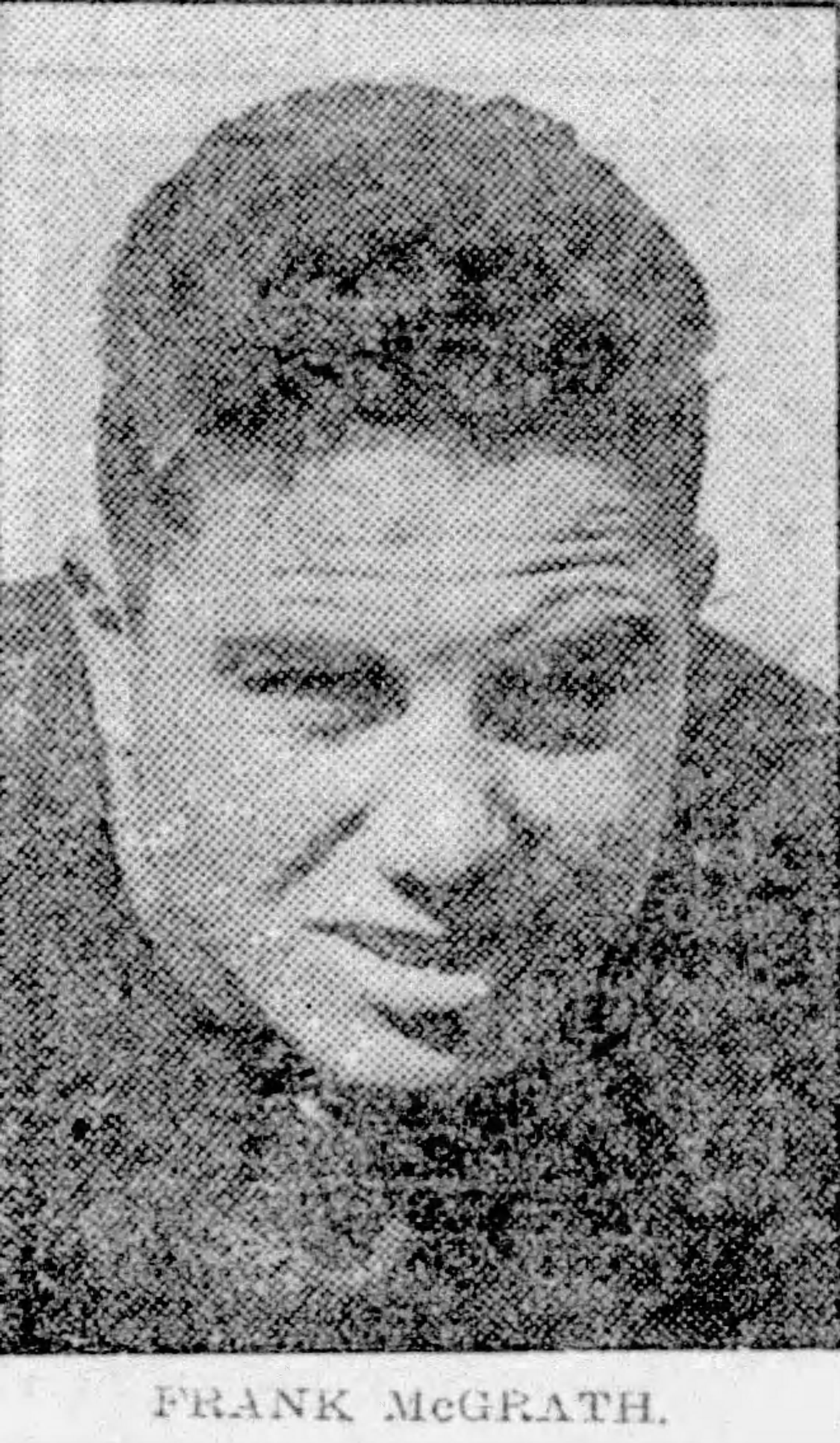
- McGrath, 1928

Profile
- Position: End

Personal information
- Born: March 13, 1904; Bay City, Michigan
- Died: March 4, 1990 (aged 85); Essexville, Michigan
- Listed height: 5 ft 11 in (1.80 m)
- Listed weight: 192 lb (87 kg)

Career information
- High school: St. James (MI)
- College: Bay City JC (1923), Georgetown (1924–1926)

Career history
- Frankford Yellow Jackets (1927); New York Yankees (1928)

Career statistics
- Games: 24
- Stats at Pro Football Reference

Frank LeDuke McGrath (March 13, 1904 – March 4, 1990) was an American football player. He played college football for Bay City Junior College (1923) and Georgetown (1924–1926). He also played professional football in the National Football League (NFL) for the Frankford Yellow Jackets (1927) and New York Yankees (1928).

== Early life ==
McGrath was born in 1904 in Bay City, Michigan, He was one of a large Irish family of 11 children raised at 501 South Johnson Street in Bay City. He attended St. James High School in Bay City. He persuaded the parish priest that the school should have a football team to compete with other parochial school teams in the area. They did not have a full-time coach but 13 students taught themselves the game and formed a team in 1920. They played with 13 player, and in one game when two players were injured and another could not make it through the game, they played with only 10 players.

== College football ==
McGrath played his first year of college football at Bay City Junior College. McGrath was the team captain.

After one year of junior college, McGrath enrolled at Georgetown in Washington, DC. He played for Georgetown from 1924 to 1926. At Georgetown, he was moved from fullback, where he had played previously. At Georgetown, he played at offensive end and defensive back. He helped lead the 1925 Georgetown Blue and Gray football team to a 9–1 record, and McGrath's accurate tackling was credited as a key element in holding opponents to only 19 points on the season. After the success of 1925, McGrath was selected as captain of the 1926 team that compiled a 7–2–1 record.

== Professional football ==
McGrath also played professional football in the National Football League (NFL) for the Frankford Yellow Jackets during 1927 season and for the New York Yankees during the 1928 season. He played at the end position and appeared in a total of 24 NFL games, 18 as a starter. After two years in the NFL McGrath later recalled that he quit the game because "it got a little too phoney for me, so I got out." He later worked as an insurance adjuster, for a time in Des Moines, Iowa, and then in Bay City.

== Later life ==
dWhen his football career ended, McGrath returned to Michigan. He worked at Anaconda Copper, a rolling mill in Detroit, and later at Fisher Body Service.

McGrath lived most of his life in Bay City and Essexville, Michigan. He married Marie Howey in 1935. They had three daughters: Patricia, Colleen, and Mary. His wife Marie predeceased him in 1984. McGrath died in 1990 at age 85 at the Bay City Medical Care Facility.
