= 1927 New York Yankees (NFL) season =

National Football League team season

1927 New York Yankees season
- Owner: C.C. Pyle
- Head coach: Ralph Scott
- Home stadium: Yankee Stadium

Results
- Record: 7–8–1
- Division place: 6th NFL
- Playoffs: No playoffs until 1932

The 1927 New York Yankees season was their inaugural season in the National Football League (NFL). The team played just four of their 16 games at home in Yankee Stadium. The Yankees finished 7–8–1, good for sixth in the 12-team league.

== History ==
Star backs for the 1927 Yankees, "Red" Grange and "Wild Bill" Kelly. Grange's action during the year was limited.

C.C. "Charlie" Pyle was a theater operator in Champaign, Illinois who in 1925 entered the world of sports entertainment by promoting an exhibition game featuring a local sensation of his acquaintance, Illinois running back Red Grange. After acting as an agent to get Grange signed with the Chicago Bears of the National Football League (NFL), in 1926 Pyle established a team of his own, the New York Yankees, seeking admission to the NFL. When his application was rejected, Pyle sprung into action establishing a rival league, the American Football League in 1926. Sailing was not smooth and the league lasted one season before folding.

Pyle then successfully joined the NFL for the 1927 season, bringing aboard the popular Grange as a player and part owner of the team. In an effort to bolster the star-power of his team, in July he added a star passer to the roster, All-American University of Montana tailback Wild Bill Kelly.

As one of only twelve teams in the league and in a position to split the lucrative New York City market with Tim Mara's fledgling New York Giants, Pyle had high expectations of financial success going into his first NFL year, telling one journalist that he hoped to clear $50,000 for his efforts.

According to Pyle, Yankee linemen were paid somewhat better than the norm — $100 to $200 per game — while stars made more. Pyle said that he carried 21 men on the roster, although only 18 were eligible in a given week due to league rules. His expenses ran approximately $3,500 per week, he reckoned.

To cover this cost there was a single revenue stream — the stadium gate. This ultimately proved inadequate, leading to the club's termination following the 1928 season.

The 1927 Yankees were the last team in NFL history to play games on six different days of the week until the 2024 Kansas City Chiefs.

== Schedule ==
Game	Date	Opponent	Result	Record	Venue	Attendance	Recap	Sources
1	October 2	at Dayton Triangles	W 6–3	1–0	Triangle Park	6,000+	Recap	
2	October 9	vs. Cleveland Bulldogs	W 13–7	2–0	Dinan Field (Detroit, Michigan)	20,000	Recap	
3	October 12	at Buffalo Bisons	W 19–8	3–0	Bison Stadium	3,500	Recap	
4	October 16	at Chicago Bears	L 0–12	3–1	Wrigley Field	30,000	Recap	
5	October 23	at Green Bay Packers	L 0–13	3–2	City Stadium	11,000	Recap	
6	October 30	at Chicago Cardinals	W 7–6	4–2	Soldier Field	15,000	Recap	
7	November 6	at Cleveland Bulldogs	L 0–15	4–3	Luna Bowl	2,500	Recap	
8	November 8	Chicago Bears	W 26–6	5–3	Yankee Stadium	10,000	Recap	
9	November 11	at Pottsville Maroons	W 19–12	6–3	Minersville Park		Recap	
10	November 13	Chicago Cardinals	W 20–6	7–3	Yankee Stadium	24,000	Recap	
11	November 24	Cleveland Bulldogs	L 19–30	7–4	Yankee Stadium	20,000	Recap	
12	November 27	at Providence Steam Roller	L 7–14	7–5	Cycledrome	10,000	Recap	
13	December 3	Providence Steam Roller	L 0–9	7–6	Archbold Stadium	5,000	Recap	
14	December 4	at New York Giants	L 0–14	7–7	Polo Grounds	10,000	Recap	
15	December 10	at Frankford Yellow Jackets	T 6–6	7–7–1	Frankford Stadium	7,000	Recap	
16	December 11	New York Giants	L 0–13	7–8–1	Yankee Stadium	5,000	Recap	

== Game summaries ==
=== Game 1: at Dayton Triangles ===
An all-time record crowd of more than 6,000 spectators assembled at Dayton's Triangle Park to see Red Grange and the New York Yankees open the 1927 NFL season of the Dayton Triangles. A defensive battle ensued, in which "The Galloping Ghost" was held to just 8 total yards from scrimmage on the day. Earl Britton of Dayton hit a 40-yard field goal in the second period to give the home team a 3–0 lead in the evenly-matched contest. That proved insufficient however, as in the third quarter a 77-yard punt return down the sideline by Yankee back Bullet Baker, who was pulled down on the 2-yard line, set up a series ending in a touchdown plunge by fullback Wes Fry. This would prove to be the final score in a 6–3 New York victory.

=== Game 2: vs. Cleveland Bulldogs at Detroit ===
The meeting of legendary Illinois runner Red Grange and Michigan passing marvel Benny Friedman — future NFL Hall of Famers both — was eagerly anticipated as the New York Yankees traveled to Detroit to take on the Cleveland Bulldogs. With the shuttering of the Detroit Panthers franchise after the 1926 season, this would be the only National League game held in the Motor City in 1927. The second quarter was where the Yankees did their damage, scoring their first touchdown after a drive featuring several solid runs by Bo Molenda, consummated by Bullet Baker taking the ball the last 8 yards with two runs for the score. A second TD followed when speedy Eddie Tryon scooped a Bulldog fumble on the Cleveland 20 and ran it back for six more points and a 13–0 halftime lead. Cleveland answered as the second half opened, with Benny Friedman grabbing an interception of a long pass before connecting four times for 40 yards as part of the ensuing touchdown drive. That ended the scoring, however, and New York escaped with a 13–7 victory.

== Standings ==
The presence of Red Grange on the roster was an important draw for the 1927 New York Yankees.

NFL standings
	W	L	T	PCT	PF	PA	STK
New York Giants	11	1	1	.917	197	20	W9
Green Bay Packers	7	2	1	.778	113	43	W1
Chicago Bears	9	3	2	.750	149	98	W2
Cleveland Bulldogs	8	4	1	.667	209	107	W5
Providence Steam Roller	8	5	1	.615	105	88	W3
New York Yankees	7	8	1	.467	142	174	L4
Frankford Yellow Jackets	6	9	3	.400	152	166	L1
Pottsville Maroons	5	8	0	.385	80	163	L1
Chicago Cardinals	3	7	1	.300	69	134	L1
Dayton Triangles	1	6	1	.143	15	57	L4
Duluth Eskimos	1	8	0	.111	68	134	L7
Buffalo Bisons	0	5	0	.000	8	123	L5

Note: Tie games were not officially counted in the standings until 1972.
