= Dewey Scanlon =

American football player and coach (1899–1944)

Profile
- Position: Wingback

Personal information
- Born: August 16, 1899; Duluth, Minnesota, U.S.
- Died: September 24, 1944 (aged 45); St. Louis County, Minnesota, U.S.
- Listed height: 5 ft 9 in (1.75 m)
- Listed weight: 192 lb (87 kg)

Career information
- College: Valparaiso

Career history

Playing
- 1926: Duluth Eskimos

Coaching
- 1924–1926: Duluth Kelleys/Eskimos
- 1929: Chicago Cardinals
- Coaching profile at Pro Football Reference
- Stats at Pro Football Reference

Dewey D. Scanlon (August 16, 1899 – September 24, 1944) was an American football coach, and was the head coach for the National Football League (NFL)'s Duluth Kelleys/Eskimos from 1924 to 1926 and for the Chicago Cardinals in 1929. As an NFL head coach, he compiled a record of 17–15–4 in four seasons. He also appeared in one game as a wingback for Duluth in 1926. Scanlon was born in Duluth, Minnesota and attended Valparaiso University.
