= 1927 Chicago Bears season =

NFL team season

- Owner: George S. Halas, Dutch Sternaman
- Head coach: George Halas
- Home stadium: Wrigley Field

Results
- Record: 9–3–2
- League place: 3rd NFL

The 1927 season was the Chicago Bears' 8th in the National Football League. The team was unable to improve on their 12–1–3 record from 1926 and finished with a 9–3–2 record under head coach George Halas earning them a third-place finish in the team standings behind the New York Giants and the Green Bay Packers.

Notable games during this season were a split of the season series with the New York Yankees, led by former and future Bear Red Grange, a split of the season's games against crosstown rivals Chicago Cardinals, two wins over the Green Bay Packers, and, oddest of all, a win and a tie over the Frankford Yellowjackets in unusual home-and-away back-to-back games on December 3 and 4.

The Bears also played the eventual champion New York Giants, losing 13–7. Paddy Driscoll, William Senn, and Joey Sternaman again starred for the Bears. Driscoll ran for 5 touchdowns and threw 4 others; Senn had 3 rushing TDs and 2 receiving scores; and Sternaman ran and caught 1 touchdown each, while passing for another. Owner and coach George Halas continued to play well, scoring 3 touchdowns himself, 2 on defense.

== Schedule ==
Game	Date	Opponent	Result	Record	Venue	Attendance	Recap	Sources
1	September 25	at Chicago Cardinals	W 9–0	1–0	Normal Park	4,000	Recap	
2	October 2	at Green Bay Packers	W 7–6	2–0	City Stadium	5,500+	Recap	
3	October 16	New York Yankees	W 12–0	3–0	Wrigley Field	20,000	Recap	
4	October 23	Cleveland Bulldogs	W 14–12	4–0	Wrigley Field	20,000	Recap	
5	October 30	Dayton Triangles	W 14–6	5–0	Wrigley Field	8,000	Recap	
6	November 6	Providence Steam Roller	T 0–0	5–0–1	Wrigley Field	15,000	Recap	
7	November 8	at New York Yankees	L 6–26	5–1–1	Yankee Stadium	10,000	Recap	
8	November 13	Pottsville Maroons	W 30–12	6–1–1	Wrigley Field	8,000	Recap	
9	November 20	Green Bay Packers	W 14–6	7–1–1	Wrigley Field	6,000	Recap	
10	November 24	Chicago Cardinals	L 0–3	7–2–1	Wrigley Field	6,000	Recap	
11	November 27	at New York Giants	L 7–13	7–3–1	Polo Grounds	15,000	Recap	
12	December 3	at Frankford Yellow Jackets	T 0–0	7–3–2	Shibe Park	4,000	Recap	
13	December 4	Frankford Yellow Jackets	W 9–0	8–3–2	Wrigley Field	2,500	Recap	
14	December 11	Duluth Eskimos	W 27–14	9–3–2	Wrigley Field	2,500	Recap	
—	December 18	Cleveland Bulldogs	cancelled due to weather					

== Game summaries ==
=== Game 3: at Green Bay Packers ===
In a Sunday confrontation deemed a "battle royal," Green Bay's Dick O'Donnell of Green Bay snagged a long pass for the first big play of the day. Controversy ensued, however. Next "Dunn shot a pass to Lewellen and it looked very much as if he were a victim of interference as he tried to grab the ball for a touchdown," the representative of the Green Bay Press-Gazette recounted. "The officials ruled the other way, however, and the Bears scrimmaged on their 20-yard line." The football rule that an incomplete forward pass in the end zone resulted in a touchback had bitten the home team hard. The Bears made effective use of their power running game in the second stanza, with reserve right halfback Bill Senn capping the climax of a long drive with a 1-yard plunge. Paddy Driscoll booted the all-important extra-point to give the Bears a 7–0 lead. The Packers' made their bid in the fourth quarter when player-coach Curly Lambeau hit on a 30-yard catch-and-run to end Lavvie Dilweg, which put the ball on the Chicago 30. Another 15 yard strike from Lambeau to Dilweg halved the distance to the end zone, although "the Bears tried to take the ball away from Dilweg and a near riot was averted." Then Dunn hit Lambeau with a pass for an apparent score, only to have it called back for violation of another rule of the day, that all passes must be thrown from at least five yards behind the line of scrimmage. The Packers were undaunted, with Dilweg making a great catch of a Dunn pass to take the ball down to the 2-yard line. Lewellen took two tries to punch the ball through to paydirt. "Joy reined supreme in the Packer camp but not for long however as Purdy, who substituted for Dunn, failed to come even close to making the extra point which would have given the Packers a tie game." A subsequent onside kick attempt failed and the Bears ran out the clock for a 7–6 victory. The Bears made extensive use of substitutes in the contest, with player-coach George Halas sending in capable replacements at key intervals to keep his best players fresh, using a noteworthy 24 players on the day.

== Standings ==
NFL standings
	W	L	T	PCT	PF	PA	STK
New York Giants	11	1	1	.917	197	20	W9
Green Bay Packers	7	2	1	.778	113	43	W1
Chicago Bears	9	3	2	.750	149	98	W2
Cleveland Bulldogs	8	4	1	.667	209	107	W5
Providence Steam Roller	8	5	1	.615	105	88	W3
New York Yankees	7	8	1	.467	142	174	L4
Frankford Yellow Jackets	6	9	3	.400	152	166	L1
Pottsville Maroons	5	8	0	.385	80	163	L1
Chicago Cardinals	3	7	1	.300	69	134	L1
Dayton Triangles	1	6	1	.143	15	57	L4
Duluth Eskimos	1	8	0	.111	68	134	L7
Buffalo Bisons	0	5	0	.000	8	123	L5

Note: Tie games were not officially counted in the standings until 1972.

== Roster ==
=== Future Hall of Fame players ===
- Paddy Driscoll, back
- George Halas, end
- Ed Healey, tackle
- Link Lyman, tackle
- George Trafton, center

=== Other leading players ===
- William Senn, back
- Ed Sternaman, back
- Joe Sternaman, quarterback
- Laurie Walquist, quarterback
