= 1927 New York Giants season =

NFL team 3rd season

- Head coach: Earl Potteiger
- Home stadium: Polo Grounds

Results
- Record: 11–1–1
- League place: 1st NFL

The 1927 New York Giants season was the franchise's 3rd season in the National Football League, and first under head coach Earl Potteiger. The Giants suffered their only loss and sole tie to the Cleveland Bulldogs. The team finished with a record of 11 wins, 1 loss, and 1 tie — best in the NFL.

They were ranked first in yards allowed, yards gained, and points allowed, and were second in points scored. Over the entire season, the Giants scored 197 points and allowed 20. The team was led in scoring by fullback Jack McBride who scored 57 points, with six rushing touchdowns, two field goals, and 15 extra points.

== Schedule ==
Game	Date	Opponent	Result	Record	Venue	Attendance	Recap	Sources
1	September 25	at Providence Steam Roller	W 8–0	1–0	Cycledrome	7,500	Recap	
2	October 2	at Cleveland Bulldogs	T 0–0	1–0–1	Luna Park	3,00	Recap	
3	October 9	at Pottsville Maroons	W 19–0	2–0–1	Minersville Park	5,000	Recap	
4	October 16	Cleveland Bulldogs	L 0–6	2–1–1	Polo Grounds	25,000	Recap	
5	October 22	at Frankford Yellow Jackets	W 13–0	3–1–1	Frankford Stadium	9,000	Recap	
6	October 23	Frankford Yellow Jackets	W 27–0	4–1–1	Polo Grounds	15,000	Recap	
7	October 30	Pottsville Maroons	W 16–0	5–1–1	Polo Grounds	20,000	Recap	
8	November 6	Duluth Eskimos	W 21–0	6–1–1	Polo Grounds	15,000	Recap	
9	November 8	Providence Steam Roller	W 25–0	7–1–1	Polo Grounds	38,000	Recap	
10	November 20	Chicago Cardinals	W 28–7	8–1–1	Polo Grounds	10,000	Recap	
11	November 27	Chicago Bears	W 13–7	9–1–1	Polo Grounds	15,000	Recap	
12	December 4	New York Yankees	W 14–0	10–1–1	Polo Grounds	10,000	Recap	
13	December 11	at New York Yankees	W 13–0	11–1–1	Yankee Stadium	8,000	Recap	

== Game summaries ==
=== Game 1: at Providence Steam Roller ===
Week Two: New York Giants at Providence Steam Roller

Quarter	1	2	3	4	Total
Giants	0	8	0	0	8
Steam Roller	0	0	0	0	0

at Cycledrome, Providence, Rhode Island

- Date: September 25
- Game attendance: 7,500

Game information

Second quarter

- NYG Jack McBride 1-yard run (kick failed)
- NYG Giants tackled Jack Cronin in end zone for a Safety

=== Game 2: at Cleveland Bulldogs ===
Week Three: New York Giants at Cleveland Bulldogs

Quarter	1	2	3	4	Total
Giants	0	0	0	0	0
Bulldogs	0	0	0	0	0

at Luna Park, Cleveland, Ohio

- Date: October 2
- Game attendance: 3,000

=== Game 3: at Pottsville Maroons ===
Week Four: New York Giants at Pottsville Maroons

Quarter	1	2	3	4	Total
Giants	0	3	9	7	19
Maroons	0	0	0	0	0

at Minersville Park, Minersville, Pennsylvania

- Date: October 9
- Game attendance: 5,000

Game information

Second quarter

- NYG McBride 27-yard FG

Third quarter

- NYG Joe Alexander 35-yard fumble return (kick failed)
- NYG McBride 18-yard FG

Fourth quarter

- NYG Mule Wilson run (McBride kick)

=== Game 4: vs. Cleveland Bulldogs ===
Week Five: Cleveland Bulldogs at New York Giants

Quarter	1	2	3	4	Total
Bulldogs	0	0	6	0	6
Giants	0	0	0	0	0

at Polo Grounds, New York, New York

- Date: October 16
- Game attendance: 25,000

Game information

Third quarter

- CLE Jim Simmons run (kick failed)

=== Game 5: at Frankford Yellow Jackets ===
Week Six: New York Giants at Frankford Yellow Jackets (Game 1)

Quarter	1	2	3	4	Total
Giants	0	0	6	7	13
Yellow Jackets	0	0	0	0	0

at Frankford Stadium, Philadelphia, Pennsylvania

- Date: October 22
- Game attendance: 9,000

Game information

Third quarter

- NYG Jack Hagerty run (kick failed)

Fourth quarter

- NYG Phil White run (McBride kick)

=== Game 6: vs. Frankford Yellow Jackets ===
Week Six: Frankford Yellow Jackets at New York Giants (Game 2)

Quarter	1	2	3	4	Total
Yellow Jackets	0	0	0	0	0
Giants	0	20	0	7	27

at Polo Grounds, New York, New York

- Date: October 23
- Game attendance: 15,000

Game information

Second quarter

- NYG Wilson run (McBride kick)
- NYG White run (McBride kick)
- NYG Wilson 40-yard pass from McBride (kick failed)

Fourth quarter

- NYG Hinkey Haines pass from McBride (kick failed)

=== Game 7: vs. Pottsville Maroons ===
Week Seven: Pottsville Maroons at New York Giants

Quarter	1	2	3	4	Total
Maroons	0	0	0	0	0
Giants	8	0	0	8	16

at Polo Grounds, New York, New York

- Date: October 30
- Game attendance: 20,000

Game information

First quarter

- NYG Safety
- NYG McBride 20-yard run (kick failed)

Fourth quarter

- NYG Frank Kirkleski (POT) out of bounds in end zone for a Safety
- NYG Doug Wycoff interception return (kick failed)

=== Game 8: vs. Duluth Eskimos ===
Week Eight: Duluth Eskimos at New York Giants

Quarter	1	2	3	4	Total
Eskimos	0	0	0	0	0
Giants	7	7	0	7	21

at Polo Grounds, New York, New York

- Date: November 6
- Game attendance: 15,000

Game information

First quarter

- NYG Wilson 3-yard run (McBride kick)

Second quarter

- NYG Wycoff 10-yard run (McBride kick)

Fourth quarter

- NYG Haines 29-yard pass from McBride (McBride kick)

=== Game 9: vs. Providence Steam Roller ===
Week Nine: Providence Steam Roller at New York Giants

Quarter	1	2	3	4	Total
Steam Roller	0	0	0	0	0
Giants	7	6	6	6	25

at Polo Grounds, New York, New York

- Date: November 8
- Game attendance: 38,000

Game information

First quarter

- NYG Wilson 54-yard interception return (McBride kick)

Second quarter

- NYG Hagerty 39 pass from McBride (kick failed)

Third quarter

- NYG Hagerty 54-yard punt return (kick failed)

Fourth quarter

- NYG Haines 9 pass from McBride (kick failed)

=== Game 10: vs. Chicago Cardinals ===
Week Ten: Chicago Cardinals at New York Giants

Quarter	1	2	3	4	Total
Cardinals	0	0	7	0	7
Giants	21	0	0	7	28

at Polo Grounds, New York, New York

- Date: November 20
- Game attendance: 10,000

Game information

First quarter

- NYG Haines pass from McBride (McBride kick)
- NYG McBride run (McBride kick)
- NYG Wilson pass from McBride (McBride kick)

Third quarter

- CHC John Vesser pass from Evar Swanson (Swanson kick)

Fourth quarter

- NYG Wycoff run (Wycoff kick)

=== Game 11: vs. Chicago Bears ===
Week Eleven: Chicago Bears at New York Giants

Quarter	1	2	3	4	Total
Bears	0	0	0	7	7
Giants	0	0	13	0	13

at Polo Grounds, New York, New York

- Date: November 27
- Game attendance: 15,000

Game information

Third quarter

- NYG McBride 2-yard run (kick failed)
- NYG McBride run (McBride kick)

Fourth quarter

- CHB Joey Sternaman pass from Laurie Walquist (Sternaman kick)

=== Game 12: vs. New York Yankees ===
In the first-ever meeting between the two New York football franchises, the Giants emerged victorious in a 14–0 shutout, memorably marked by the Hinky Haines return of a punt 75 yards to paydirt early in the first quarter. A second Giants touchdown was recorded in the third quarter, when fullback Jack McBride successfully plunged the ball off tackle from the 1-yard line. McBride was also responsible for both conversion kicks after the two scores. The slippery field caused many fumbles by both teams on the day and prevented successful use of the passing game by either squad.

Week Twelve: New York Yankees at New York Giants

Quarter	1	2	3	4	Total
Yankees	0	0	0	0	0
Giants	7	0	7	0	14

at Polo Grounds, New York, New York

- Date: December 4
- Game attendance: 10,000

Game information

First quarter

- NYG Haines 75-yard kickoff return (McBride kick)

Third quarter

- NYG McBride 2-yard run (McBride kick)

=== Game 13: at New York Yankees ===
Week Thirteen: New York Giants at New York Yankees

Quarter	1	2	3	4	Total
Giants	0	0	7	6	13
Yankees	0	0	0	0	0

at Yankee Stadium, Bronx, New York

- Date: December 11
- Game attendance: 8,000

Game information

Third quarter

- NYG White 2-yard run (White kick)

Fourth quarter

- NYG Haines 60-yard run (kick failed)

== Standings ==
NFL standings
	W	L	T	PCT	PF	PA	STK
New York Giants	11	1	1	.917	197	20	W9
Green Bay Packers	7	2	1	.778	113	43	W1
Chicago Bears	9	3	2	.750	149	98	W2
Cleveland Bulldogs	8	4	1	.667	209	107	W5
Providence Steam Roller	8	5	1	.615	105	88	W3
New York Yankees	7	8	1	.467	142	174	L4
Frankford Yellow Jackets	6	9	3	.400	152	166	L1
Pottsville Maroons	5	8	0	.385	80	163	L1
Chicago Cardinals	3	7	1	.300	69	134	L1
Dayton Triangles	1	6	1	.143	15	57	L4
Duluth Eskimos	1	8	0	.111	68	134	L7
Buffalo Bisons	0	5	0	.000	8	123	L5

Note: Tie games were not officially counted in the standings until 1972.

== See also ==
- List of New York Giants seasons
