= Joey Maxwell =

American football player and lawyer (1904–1983)

Profile
- Positions: Center, end

Personal information
- Born: November 5, 1904; Cincinnati, U.S.
- Died: February 21, 1983 (aged 78); Abington, Pennsylvania, U.S.
- Listed height: 6 ft 2 in (1.88 m)
- Listed weight: 197 lb (89 kg)

Career information
- High school: Roman Catholic (PA)
- College: Notre Dame

Career history
- Frankford Yellow Jackets (1927–1929)

Career statistics
- Games: 38
- Stats at Pro Football Reference

Joseph William Maxwell (November 5, 1904 – February 21, 1983) was an American football player and lawyer.

A native of Philadelphia, Maxwell attended Roman Catholic High School. He played college football at Notre Dame. He was the center in Notre Dame's "Seven Mules" line that also featured the backfield known as the Four Horsemen.

He played professional football in the National Football League (NFL) for the Frankford Yellow Jackets from 1927 to 1929. He played at the center and end positions and appeared in a total of 38 NFL games, 25 as a starter.

After retiring from football, he served as a coach for the 1931 Saint Louis Billikens football team. He received a law degree from Saint Louis University where he practiced law. He worked for Philco Ford Co. as a lawyer and later as labor relations director from 1946 to 1969. He lived in his later years in Glenside, Pennsylvania, where he collapsed and died in 1983.
