= 1927 Dayton Triangles season =

National Football League team season

- Head coach: Lou Mahrt

Results
- Record: 1–6–1
- League place: 10th NFL

The 1927 Dayton Triangles season was their eighth in the league. The team failed to improve on their previous output of 1–4–1, losing six games. They finished tenth in the league.

On September 24, the Triangles defeated the Frankford Yellow Jackets in Philadelphia, which would be their final NFL win, despite playing two more seasons in the league. The following week, the New York Yankees came to Triangle Park and won, 6–3, in the last NFL game the Triangles would ever play in Dayton. (Seven years later, the Cincinnati Reds moved their first home game of the 1934 season to Triangle Park, losing to the Chicago Cardinals, 9–0; this would prove to be the final NFL game in Dayton.)

== Schedule ==
Game	Date	Opponent	Result	Record	Venue	Attendance	Recap	Sources
1	September 18	at Green Bay Packers	L 0–14	0–1	City Stadium	3,600	Recap	
2	September 24	at Frankford Yellow Jackets	W 6–3	1–1	Frankford Stadium	7,000	Recap	
3	October 2	New York Yankees	L 3–6	1–2	Triangle Park	6,000	Recap	
4	October 8	at Frankford Yellow Jackets	T 0–0	1–2–1	Frankford Stadium	4,000	Recap	
5	October 9	at Chicago Cardinals	L 0–7	1–3–1	Normal Park	2,500	Recap	
6	October 23	at Providence Steam Roller	L 0–7	1–4–1	Cycledrome	6,500	Recap	
7	October 30	at Chicago Bears	L 6–14	1–5–1	Wrigley Field	8,000	Recap	
8	November 13	at Green Bay Packers	L 0–6	1–6–1	City Stadium	2,500	Recap	

== Standings ==
NFL standings
	W	L	T	PCT	PF	PA	STK
New York Giants	11	1	1	.917	197	20	W9
Green Bay Packers	7	2	1	.778	113	43	W1
Chicago Bears	9	3	2	.750	149	98	W2
Cleveland Bulldogs	8	4	1	.667	209	107	W5
Providence Steam Roller	8	5	1	.615	105	88	W3
New York Yankees	7	8	1	.467	142	174	L4
Frankford Yellow Jackets	6	9	3	.400	152	166	L1
Pottsville Maroons	5	8	0	.385	80	163	L1
Chicago Cardinals	3	7	1	.300	69	134	L1
Dayton Triangles	1	6	1	.143	15	57	L4
Duluth Eskimos	1	8	0	.111	68	134	L7
Buffalo Bisons	0	5	0	.000	8	123	L5

Note: Tie games were not officially counted in the standings until 1972.
