= 1927 Chicago Cardinals season =

American football team season

- Head coach: Guy Chamberlin
- Home stadium: Normal Park

Results
- Record: 3–7–1
- League place: 9th NFL

The 1927 Chicago Cardinals season was their eighth in the National Football League. The team failed to improve on their previous output of 5–6–1, winning only three games. They finished ninth in the league.

== Schedule ==
Game	Date	Opponent	Result	Record
1	September 25	Chicago Bears	L 0–9	0–1
2	October 2	Pottsville Maroons	W 19–7	1–1
3	October 9	Dayton Triangles	W 7–0	2–1
4	October 16	at Green Bay Packers	L 0–13	2–2
5	October 30	New York Yankees	L 6–7	2–3
6	November 6	Green Bay Packers	T 6–6	2–3–1
7	November 13	at New York Yankees	L 6–20	2–4–1
8	November 19	at Frankford Yellow Jackets	L 8–12	2–5–1
9	November 20	at New York Giants	L 7–28	2–6–1
10	November 24	at Chicago Bears	W 3–0	3–6–1
11	November 27	Cleveland Bulldogs	L 7–32	3–7–1

== Standings ==
NFL standings
	W	L	T	PCT	PF	PA	STK
New York Giants	11	1	1	.917	197	20	W9
Green Bay Packers	7	2	1	.778	113	43	W1
Chicago Bears	9	3	2	.750	149	98	W2
Cleveland Bulldogs	8	4	1	.667	209	107	W5
Providence Steam Roller	8	5	1	.615	105	88	W3
New York Yankees	7	8	1	.467	142	174	L4
Frankford Yellow Jackets	6	9	3	.400	152	166	L1
Pottsville Maroons	5	8	0	.385	80	163	L1
Chicago Cardinals	3	7	1	.300	69	134	L1
Dayton Triangles	1	6	1	.143	15	57	L4
Duluth Eskimos	1	8	0	.111	68	134	L7
Buffalo Bisons	0	5	0	.000	8	123	L5

Note: Tie games were not officially counted in the standings until 1972.
