= Ed Weir =

American football player and coach (1903–1991)

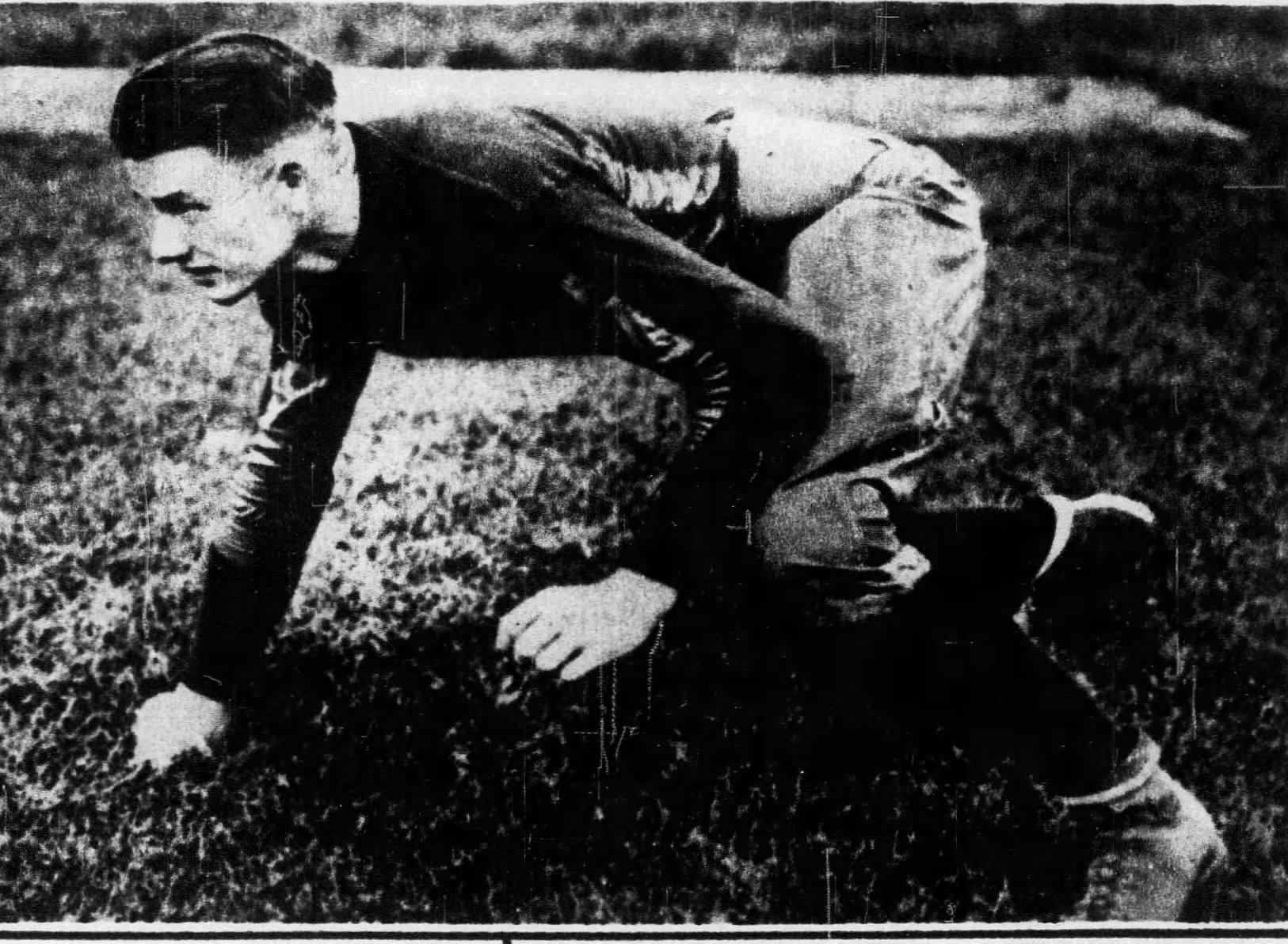
- Weir as a Nebraska player in 1924

No. 19, 16
- Position: Offensive tackle

Personal information
- Born: March 14, 1903; Superior, Nebraska, U.S.
- Died: May 15, 1991 (aged 88); Lincoln, Nebraska, U.S.
- Listed height: 5 ft 10 in (1.78 m)
- Listed weight: 192 lb (87 kg)

Career information
- High school: Superior (NE)
- College: Nebraska (1923–1925)

Career history

Playing
- Frankford Yellow Jackets (1926–1928)

Coaching
- Frankford Yellow Jackets (1927–1928) Head coach

Awards and highlights
- As a player: NFL champion (1926); First-team All-Pro (1927); Unanimous All-American (1925); Consensus All-American (1924); First-team All-MVC (1925)

Career statistics
- Games played: 36
- Games started: 25
- Stats at Pro Football Reference

Head coaching record
- Career: 15–7–4 (.654)
- Coaching profile at Pro Football Reference
- College Football Hall of Fame

Samuel Edwin Weir (March 14, 1903 – May 15, 1991) was an American professional football player and coach for the Frankford Yellow Jackets of the National Football League (NFL). He was the first Nebraska Cornhuskers player elected to the College Football Hall of Fame and is known as one of Nebraska's greatest athletes. In 2005, the Omaha World-Herald, as part of a series on the 100 Greatest Athletes of Nebraska, named Weir the 19th best athlete in the state's history.

== Biography ==
Born in Superior, Nebraska in 1903, Weir played on the line at Nebraska and was captain of the 1923 team that beat the "Four Horsemen" of the University of Notre Dame. He was elected All-American in 1924 and 1925.

Weir turned down offers to play professionally in Jacksonville in 1925. He went on to play professionally for the Frankford Yellow Jackets of the National Football League (NFL). In 1927, he and several teammates took over the coaching job in mid-season and achieved a 6–9–3 record, as Weir earned All-Pro honors. The following year, Weir coached the team to an 11–3–2 record, good for a second-place league finish.

Weir was a member of the Acacia fraternity and the track and field complex was later named in his honor; this complex was later demolished and replaced in 2024 by a football practice facility.
