= Cobb Rooney =

American football player (1900–1973)

Profile
- Position: Running back

Personal information
- Born: March 23, 1900; Virginia, Minnesota, U.S.
- Died: May 1973 (aged 73)

Career history
- 1924–1927: Duluth Kelleys/Eskimos
- 1928: New York Yankees
- 1929–1930: Chicago Cardinals
- Stats at Pro Football Reference

Harry Cobb Rooney (March 23, 1900 – May 1973) was an American professional football player who was a running back for seven seasons for the Duluth Kelleys/Eskimos, New York Yankees, and Chicago Cardinals.
