= Tennessee Docs football =

Football team of the University of Tennessee

- First season: 1895; 131 years ago
- Last season: 1926
- Stadium: Russwood Park
- Location: Memphis, Tennessee
- Conference: Independent

The Tennessee Docs football program (variously called Docs, "Tennessee Medicos" or "UT Doctors") represented the University of Tennessee College of Medicine in Memphis, Tennessee in the sport of American football. The team played at Russwood Park. Bill Brennan was coach for several years.
