= Mount Aukum, California =

Unincorporated community in California, United States

Aukum
- Unincorporated community
- Location in California Aukum (the United States)
- Coordinates: 38°33′26″N 120°43′36″W
- Country: United States
- State: California
- County: El Dorado
- Elevation: 2,156 ft (657 m)

Aukum (Miwok: Ochum), officially Mount Aukum, is an unincorporated community in El Dorado County, California, United States. It is located 1 mi (1.6 km) northeast of River Pines, 1.2 mi (1.9 km) south of Mount Aukum and 8.5 mi (13.7 km) northeast of Plymouth, at an elevation of 2,155 feet (657 m). The ZIP code is 95656.

The Aukum post office operated from 1895 to 1914 and 1920 to 1961, when it was changed to Mount Aukum.
