= Pete Richards (American football) =

American football player (1905–1989)

Profile
- Position: Center

Personal information
- Born: May 13, 1905; Lansdowne, Pennsylvania
- Died: April 4, 1989 (aged 83)
- Listed height: 5 ft 10 in (1.78 m)
- Listed weight: 190 lb (86 kg)

Career information
- High school: Lansdowne (PA), Technical (PA)
- College: Swarthmore

Career history
- Frankford Yellow Jackets (1927)

Career statistics
- Games: 3
- Stats at Pro Football Reference

Pierce L. Richards (May 13, 1905 – April 4, 1989) was an American football player.

A native of Lansdowne, Pennsylvania, Richards played college football for Swarthmore. He played professional football in the National Football League (NFL) as a center for the Frankford Yellow Jackets during 1927 season. He appeared in a total of three NFL games, one as a starter.
