= Ole Haugsrud =

American sports executive (1899-1976)

Oluf Roy Haugsrud (May 13, 1899 – March 13, 1976) was an American sports executive. Haugsrud was born in Superior, Wisconsin.

Haugsrud was owner of the Duluth Eskimos of the National Football League (NFL) in the late-1920s. His signing of Ernie Nevers and having the Eskimos barnstorm, is credited as helping grow the league at critical time. He later sold the team back to the NFL. Part of the deal was that he would have first rights to any future NFL team in the state of Minnesota. Though he passed on a stake in the Minneapolis Red Jackets in 1929, when the NFL expanded to Minneapolis–Saint Paul in January 1960, Haugsrud was given 10% ownership. He remained part owner of the Minnesota Vikings until his death in 1976 in Duluth. Haugsrud was the senior nominee for the Pro Football Hall of Fame in 1973. He was not elected.

The Vikings name and team colors are the same as Haugsrud's high school, Central High School in Superior. The Vikings secondary logo that is still in use is a modified version of Central's original logo.

There was a field in Superior, Wisconsin called Ole Haugsrud Field. The University of Wisconsin–Superior football team played there until the team went out of existence in the mid-1990s. The Superior High School Spartans played there until 2014 (when the high school's new stadium opened).
