= 1927 Providence Steam Roller season =

National Football League team season

- Head coach: Jimmy Conzelman

Results
- Record: 8–5–1
- League place: 5th in NFL

The 1927 Providence Steam Roller season was their third in the league. The team improved on their previous season's output of 5–7–1, winning eight games. They finished fifth in the league.

== Schedule ==
Week	Date	Opponent	Result	Record	Venue	Attendance	Recap	Sources
1	September 25	New York Giants	L 0–8	0–1	Cycledrome	7,500	Recap	
2	October 2	Buffalo Bisons	W 5–0	1–1	Cycledrome	3,500	Recap	
3	October 16	Pottsville Maroons	L 3–6	1–2	Cycledrome	7,500	Recap	
4	October 23	Dayton Triangles	W 7–0	2–2	Cycledrome	6,500	Recap	
5	October 29	at Frankford Yellow Jackets	W 20–7	3–2	Frankford Stadium	5,000	Recap	
6	October 30	Frankford Yellow Jackets	W 14–0	4–2	Cycledrome	9,000	Recap	
7	November 6	at Chicago Bears	T 0–0	4–2–1	Wrigley Field	15,000	Recap	
8	November 8	at New York Giants	L 0–25	4–3–1	Polo Grounds	38,000	Recap	
9	November 13	Duluth Eskimos	W 13–7	5–3–1	Cycledrome	7,500	Recap	
10	November 20	Cleveland Bulldogs	L 0–22	5–4–1	Cycledrome	12,000	Recap	
11	November 24	at Pottsville Maroons	L 0–6	5–5–1	Minersville Park	4,000	Recap	
12	November 27	New York Yankees	W 14–7	6–5–1	Cycledrome	10,000	Recap	
13	December 3	at New York Yankees	W 9–0	7–5–1	Archbold Stadium	5,000	Recap	
14	December 4	Pottsville Maroons	W 20–0	8–5–1	Cycledrome	1,500	Recap	

== Standings ==
NFL standings
	W	L	T	PCT	PF	PA	STK
New York Giants	11	1	1	.917	197	20	W9
Green Bay Packers	7	2	1	.778	113	43	W1
Chicago Bears	9	3	2	.750	149	98	W2
Cleveland Bulldogs	8	4	1	.667	209	107	W5
Providence Steam Roller	8	5	1	.615	105	88	W3
New York Yankees	7	8	1	.467	142	174	L4
Frankford Yellow Jackets	6	9	3	.400	152	166	L1
Pottsville Maroons	5	8	0	.385	80	163	L1
Chicago Cardinals	3	7	1	.300	69	134	L1
Dayton Triangles	1	6	1	.143	15	57	L4
Duluth Eskimos	1	8	0	.111	68	134	L7
Buffalo Bisons	0	5	0	.000	8	123	L5

Note: Tie games were not officially counted in the standings until 1972.
