= Dick Moynihan =

American football player (1902–1991)

Profile
- Positions: Fullback, blocking back

Personal information
- Born: January 9, 1902; Haverhill, Massachusetts, U.S.
- Died: October 8, 1991 (aged 89); Haverhill, Massachusetts, U.S.
- Listed height: 5 ft 8 in (1.73 m)
- Listed weight: 160 lb (73 kg)

Career information
- High school: St. James (MA)
- College: Villanova

Career history
- Frankford Yellow Jackets (1927)

Career statistics
- Games: 9
- Stats at Pro Football Reference

Richard A. Moynihan (January 8, 1902 – October 8, 1991) was an American football player.

A native of Haverhill, Massachusetts, Moynihan played college football for Villanova. He played professional football in the National Football League (NFL) for the Frankford Yellow Jackets during 1927 season. He played at the fullback and blocking back positions and appeared in a total of nine NFL games, four as a starter.
