= Carl Davis (American football, born 1903) =

American football player (1903–1959)

Profile
- Positions: End, tackle, guard

Personal information
- Born: May 19, 1903; Charleston, West Virginia
- Died: October 14, 1959 (aged 56); Charleston, West Virginia
- Listed height: 6 ft 0 in (1.83 m)
- Listed weight: 194 lb (88 kg)

Career information
- High school: Charleston (WV)
- College: West Virginia

Career history
- Frankford Yellow Jackets (1927)

Career statistics
- Games: 8
- Stats at Pro Football Reference

Carl Lewis Davis (May 19, 1903 – October 14, 1959) was an American football player.

A native of Charleston, West Virginia, Davis played college football as a tackle for West Virginia. He was a member of the school's undefeated 1922 football team. He was also a standout in track and set a school record in the shot put that lasted for more than 30 years.

He played professional football in the National Football League (NFL) for the Frankford Yellow Jackets during 1927 season. He played at the end, tackle, and guard positions and appeared in a total of eight NFL games, three as a starter.

After his playing career, Davis was an attorney in Charleston. He also served on the Charleston City Council and ran as a Republican candidate for prosecuting attorney. He died in his sleep in 1959 at age 56. At the West Virginia-Pitt football game on October 17, 1959, the crowd bowed its head in a moment of silence for Davis.
