= Ned Wilcox =

American football player (1904–1968)

No. 6
- Position: Back

Personal information
- Born: February 7, 1904; Baltimore, Maryland, U.S.
- Died: September 1968 (age 64); New Jersey, U.S.
- Listed height: 5 ft 11 in (1.80 m)
- Listed weight: 185 lb (84 kg)

Career information
- High school: Lansdowne (Lansdowne, Pennsylvania)
- College: Swarthmore

Career history
- Frankford Yellow Jackets (1926–1927)

Career statistics
- Games: 26
- Stats at Pro Football Reference

Edmund Quincy "Ned" Wilcox (February 7, 1904 – September 1968) was an American football player. Wilcox played college football at Swarthmore from 1923 to 1925 and professional football for the Frankford Yellow Jackets in 1926 and 1927.

== Early life ==
Wilcox was born in Baltimore in 1904. He attended Lansdowne High School in Lansdowne, Pennsylvania, playing fullback for the football team from 1919 to 1921 and serving as team captain in 1921.

== Swarthmore ==
Wilcox played college football as a fullback at Swarthmore from 1923 to 1925. In his final game for Swarthmore, he set a record with six touchdowns despite having ruptured a blood vessel in his leg during the first half.

== Professional ==
In September 1926, Wilcox signed with the Frankford Yellow Jackets of the National Football League. He played at the halfback and fullback positions for Frankford during 1926 and 1927 seasons, appearing in a total of 26 NFL games, 17 as a starter.

== Later life ==
Wilcox died in 1968 at Radnor Township, Pennsylvania.
