= 1927 Cleveland Bulldogs season =

National Football League team season

- Owner: Herbert Brandt
- Head coach: Roy Andrews
- Home stadium: Luna Park

Results
- Record: 8–4–1
- League place: 4th NFL

The 1927 Cleveland Bulldogs season was their fourth season in the National Football League (NFL). The team improved on their previous output of 5–8–1, winning eight games. They finished fourth in the league. The team relocated to Detroit, Michigan after the season, playing one season as the Detroit Wolverines in 1928.

== Schedule ==
Game	Date	Opponent	Result	Record	Venue	Attendance	Recap	Sources
1	September 25	at Green Bay Packers	L 7–12	0–1	City Stadium	4,500	Recap	
2	October 2	New York Giants	T 0–0	0–1–1	Luna Park	3,000	Recap	
3	October 9	New York Yankees	L 7–13	0–2–1	Briggs Stadium	20,000	Recap	
4	October 16	at New York Giants	W 6–0	1–2–1	Polo Grounds	25,000	Recap	
5	October 23	at Chicago Bears	L 12–14	1–3–1	Wrigley Field	20,000	Recap	
6	October 30	Duluth Eskimos	W 21–20	2–3–1	Luna Park	12,000	Recap	
7	November 6	New York Yankees	W 15–0	3–3–1	Luna Park	2,500	Recap	
8	November 12	at Frankford Yellow Jackets	L 0–22	3–4–1	Frankford Stadium	6,000	Recap	
9	November 13	Frankford Yellow Jackets	W 37–0	4–4–1	Luna Park	5,000	Recap	
10	November 20	at Providence Steam Roller	W 22–0	5–4–1	Cycledrome	12,000	Recap	
11	November 24	at New York Yankees	W 30–19	6–4–1	Yankee Stadium	15,000	Recap	
12	November 27	at Chicago Cardinals	W 32–7	7–4–1	Soldier Field	5,000	Recap	
13	December 3	Duluth Eskimos	W 20–0	8–4–1	Luna Park		Recap	
—	December 18	at Chicago Bears	cancelled due to weather					

== Standings ==
NFL standings
	W	L	T	PCT	PF	PA	STK
New York Giants	11	1	1	.917	197	20	W9
Green Bay Packers	7	2	1	.778	113	43	W1
Chicago Bears	9	3	2	.750	149	98	W2
Cleveland Bulldogs	8	4	1	.667	209	107	W5
Providence Steam Roller	8	5	1	.615	105	88	W3
New York Yankees	7	8	1	.467	142	174	L4
Frankford Yellow Jackets	6	9	3	.400	152	166	L1
Pottsville Maroons	5	8	0	.385	80	163	L1
Chicago Cardinals	3	7	1	.300	69	134	L1
Dayton Triangles	1	6	1	.143	15	57	L4
Duluth Eskimos	1	8	0	.111	68	134	L7
Buffalo Bisons	0	5	0	.000	8	123	L5

Note: Tie games were not officially counted in the standings until 1972.
