= Hinkey Haines =

American baseball and football player (1898–1979)

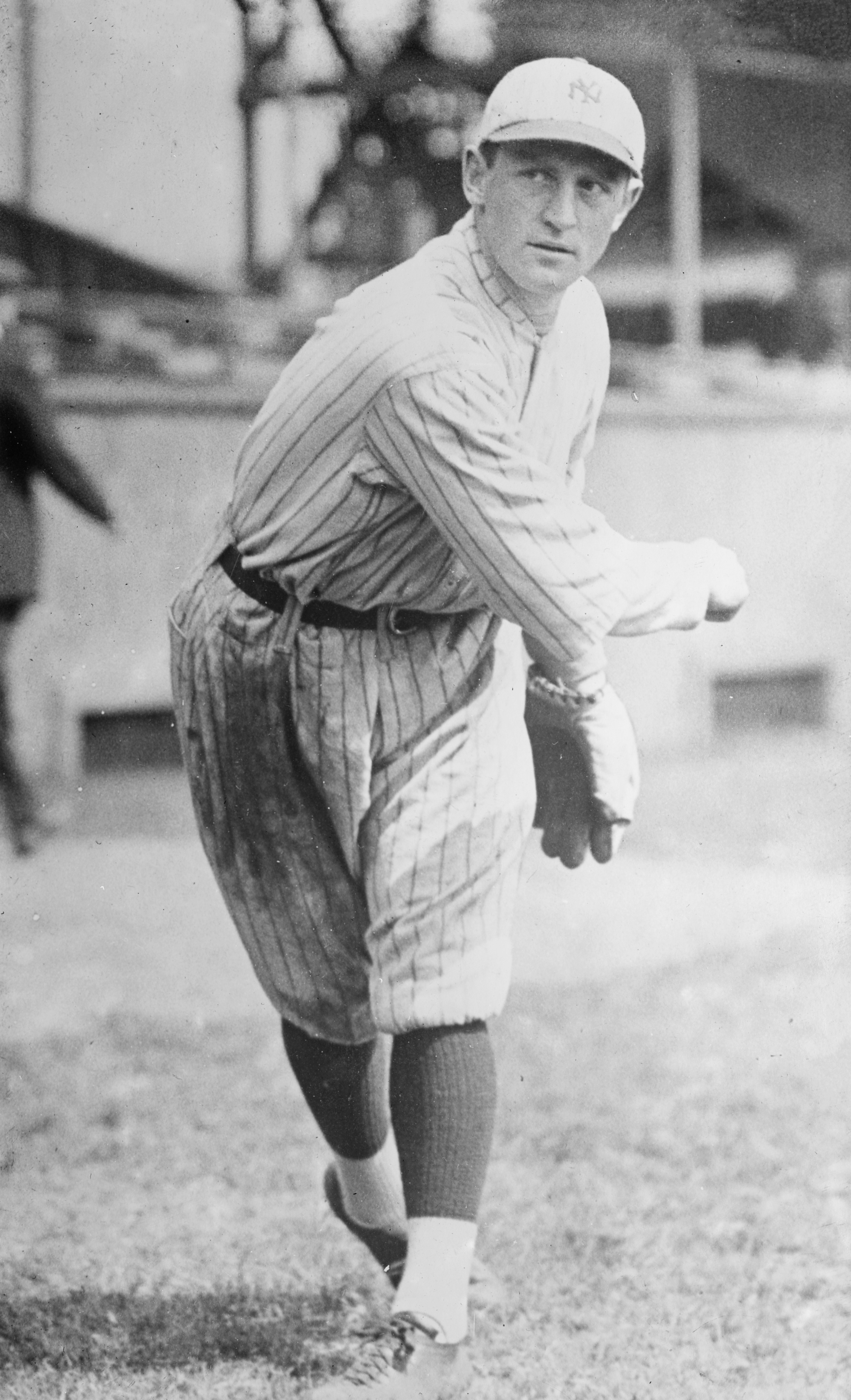
- Haines in 1923

No. 1, 2
- Position: Halfback

Personal information
- Born: December 23, 1898; Red Lion, Pennsylvania, U.S.
- Died: January 9, 1979 (aged 80); Wynnewood, Pennsylvania, U.S.
- Listed height: 5 ft 10 in (1.78 m)
- Listed weight: 170 lb (77 kg)

Career information
- High school: Red Lion High School
- College: Penn State; Lebanon Valley

Career history

Playing
- 1921: Union Quakers of Philadelphia
- 1925–1928: New York Giants
- 1929, 1931: Staten Island Stapletons

Coaching
- 1926–1931: New York Giants (assistant)
- 1931: Staten Island Stapletons

Awards and highlights
- NFL champion (1927); Third-team All-American (1920)
- Coaching profile at Pro Football Reference
- Stats at Pro Football Reference

Other information
- Military career
- Allegiance: United States
- Branch: U.S. Army
- Service years: 1918–1919
- Conflicts: World War I
- Baseball career
- Outfielder
- Batted: Right Threw: Right

MLB debut
- April 20, 1923, for the New York Yankees

Last MLB appearance
- October 7, 1923, for the New York Yankees

MLB statistics
- Batting average: .160
- Home Runs: 0
- Runs Batted In: 3
- Stats at Baseball Reference

Teams
- New York Yankees (1923)

Career highlights and awards
- World Series champion (1923)

Henry Luther "Hinkey" Haines (December 23, 1898 – January 9, 1979) was an American professional athlete who played football in the National Football League (NFL) and baseball in Major League Baseball (MLB). Haines was a star of the New York Giants football team in his time and has the distinction of being the only athlete to have played on national championship teams in both baseball and football. He won the 1923 World Series with the New York Yankees and the 1927 NFL Championship with the New York Giants.

== Background ==
Haines was born in Red Lion, Pennsylvania. He batted and threw right-handed, was 5'10" in height and 170 pounds in weight. Haines graduated from Red Lion High School in 1916 and attended Lebanon Valley College, where he played a major role in shaping their football program. Haines left Lebanon Valley in 1918 to serve in World War I.

After serving in World War I, he attended Penn State University in 1919. He earned varsity letters in baseball, football, and basketball, and joined Delta Upsilon fraternity. Haines earned All-American honors in both football and baseball while at Penn State. He is in the Red Lion Area Senior High School's Hall of Fame.

Haines was a Freemason and a member of Red Lion Lodge No. 649, F.&A.M.

== Professional career ==
Haynes on the cover of a 1926 New York Football Giants game program.

=== Baseball ===
On April 20, 1923, Haines made his Major League debut at the age of 24. He only played one season, and was used many times as a defensive replacement/pinch runner. In his first three appearances, he was used as a pinch runner, coming around to score on all three occasions. In his overall 28 games, he collected nine runs, four hits, two doubles, three RBI, three stolen bases and a .160 batting average. In the field, Haines was flawless. He had a 1.000 fielding percentage with 17 chances.

Haines appeared in two World Series games in 1923, registering one at bat without a hit. As a pinch runner, however, he was able to score one run: the tying run for the Yankees in the final game. Haines stayed in the game defensively, and was playing center field when the Yankees recorded the last out in the 1923 World Series to become world champions. This was Haines' last professional baseball appearance.

=== Football ===
In the fall, he played professional football and was the quarterback of the 1927 New York Giants team—a team that won the Giants' first NFL championship. Joe Guyon was with him in the backfield. After playing for the Giants from 1925 to 1928, he played for the Staten Island Stapletons in 1929 and 1931, a team that he also coached.

After his career as halfback for the Giants ended, he became their offensive coach from 1926 through 1931. Haines was an NFL official for a time after he finished coaching.

== Later life ==
In later years, Haines settled in the Philadelphia area where he became active in Little Theater as an actor and director. He died on January 9, 1979 at Lankenau Medical Center in Wynnewood, Pennsylvania, after a long illness. His body was laid to rest in Middletown Cemetery in Middletown, Dauphin County, Pennsylvania.

== See also ==
- History of the New York Giants (1925–78)
