= Barney Wentz =

American football player (1901–1963)

No. 10, 32, 15
- Position: Fullback

Personal information
- Born: April 21, 1901; Shenandoah, Pennsylvania, U.S.
- Died: May 25, 1963 (aged 62); Ashland, Pennsylvania, U.S.
- Listed height: 5 ft 11 in (1.80 m)
- Listed weight: 204 lb (93 kg)

Career information
- College: Penn State

Career history
- Pottsville Maroons (1925–1928)

Awards and highlights
- First-team All-NFL (1925); All-Pro (1926); Ralph Scott's Power Team (1927)
- Stats at Pro Football Reference

Byron W. "Barney" Wentz (April 21, 1901 – May 25, 1963) was an American football player. He was one of the leading offensive stars during the early years of the National Football League (NFL).

Wentz attended Penn State University. There helped the Nittany Lions get to the 1923 Rose Bowl. In 1925 Wentz made his NFL debut with the Pottsville Maroons. In 1925 Wentz helped the Maroons win the NFL Championship. However the title was stripped from the team due to a rules violation. Barney was also instrumental at during Pottsville's infamous win against the Notre Dame All-Stars featuring the Four Horsemen, a team that was considered better than any amateur or pro team, in 1925.

During an All-Pro season in 1926, he led the NFL with 10 touchdowns and helped the Maroons finish 3rd in the standings with a 10-2 record. In a game against the Akron Indians he had 3 rushing touchdowns. He also was third-best in scoring with 60 points in 1926. Wentz finished his career with 17 touchdowns, 1 field goal and 1 extra point kick for a total of 108 points in 40 Games with Pottsville.

He died at Ashland in 1963.
