= Bill Senn =

American football player (1905–1973)

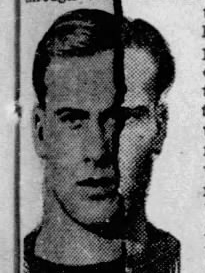
- Senn in 1926

Profile
- Position: Running back

Personal information
- Born: July 14, 1905; Macomb, Illinois
- Listed height: 6 ft 0 in (1.83 m)
- Listed weight: 177 lb (80 kg)

Career information
- High school: Macomb (IL)
- College: Knox College

Career history
- Chicago Bears (1926–1931); Brooklyn Dodgers (1931); Cincinnati Reds/St. Louis Gunners (1933–1934)

Career statistics
- Games played: 79
- Games started: 18
- Touchdowns: 25
- Stats at Pro Football Reference

William Franklin Senn (July 14, 1905 – September 1973) was a professional American football running back in the National Football League. He played eight seasons for the Chicago Bears, the Brooklyn Dodgers, and the Cincinnati Reds/St. Louis Gunners.

Senn played college football at Knox College (Illinois).

Between 1935 and 1942 he operated a Canton creamery, and during the war served in the Army. In 1947 he became the football coach at Urbana High School.
