= 1927 NFL season =

American football season

Regular season
- Duration: September 19 – December 19, 1927
- Champions: New York Giants

NFL teams

The 1927 NFL season was the eighth regular season of the National Football League. It was preceded by an April 1927 purge of the financially weakest franchises from the league roster, with the total number of NFL teams ultimately dropping from 22 in 1926 to just 12 in 1927.

The 1927 season also saw the elimination of black players from NFL ranks, foreshadowing the racial color bar that would be in effect from 1934 to 1946.

The New York Giants were named NFL Champions in 1927, although no Championship Playoff game took place.

== History ==
The 1926 NFL season had been a costly one for the league's owners, forced into the position of doing battle with the upstart American Football League launched by the jilted C. C. Pyle when the application for admission of his New York Yankees had been rejected due to the territorial claims of the New York Giants. Some big city franchises held grand aspirations while other smaller market teams staggered on the edge of the financial abyss.

=== Relegation ===
The weekend of February 5–6, an owners' meeting was held at the Astor Hotel in New York City at which tentative plans were made to reorganize the NFL into two classes, "A" and "B", with weaker teams demoted to the second division. With free entry into the NFL upon payment of a relatively minimal franchise fee, the size of the league had become unwieldy in the view of the most prominent league owners.

Weaker clubs would thus be cleansed from the 22-team league — franchises which could not fill their modest 4,000 seat stadiums or clubs such as the Oorang Indians, Columbus Panhandles, and Los Angeles Buccaneers which played no home games at all, instead booking an irregular string of contests on the road in return for the NFL's visitors' guarantee of $2,500 per game.

A follow-up meeting was held on April 23 and 24 in Cleveland's Statler Hotel to execute league reorganization. In the circular letter formally calling this meeting, NFL Commissioner Joe F. Carr stated: "As you are aware, this meeting is for the purpose of taking final action on any plans that will be proposed for the reorganization of the league and we would suggest that you would come to discuss this proposition from every angle.

Although the splitting of the league into tiers had been initially envisioned, following debate at the closed-door meeting a more draconian option was exercised: the NFL would continue as a single-tier league, albeit with financially struggling teams removed outright. Financially unstable teams were given the choice of terminating their association with the league or suspending operations until the franchise could be sold. Any franchise not sold or reactivated by July 7, 1928, would have its charter unilaterally terminated.

For 1927, the NFL would require its franchises to host no fewer than four home games, each with a guarantee of $3,000 paid out to the visiting club. The league also upped its "guarantee fund" to insure against default from $1,500 to $2,500 per club, payable as a certified check to the league office ahead of the forthcoming July scheduling meeting.

These new financial requirements served to drive the league's weaker teams from the field, with the local press breaking the news that "a year's football vacation" had been effectively declared for "Milwaukee, Hammond, Detroit, Los Angeles, Louisville, Canton, Hartford, Rochester Kodaks, Brooklyn, Minneapolis Marines, and Kansas City." Nor would the Columbus Panhandles, Akron Indians, or Racine Legion be part of the league in 1927.

The Kansas City Cowboys traveling team was slated for a move to Cleveland, where they were to become the 1927 iteration of the Cleveland Bulldogs.

The radical loss of 10 teams which ensued was not prescribed — rather, a more modest reduction to a 16 team NFL loop had been envisioned. It was not until the National League's scheduling meeting held in Green Bay on July 16 and 17 that it was learned Commissioner Carr's vaunted "16-spoke wheel, composed entirely of first-class clubs" had attenuated to just 12 clubs — ten holdovers and two expansion teams — few of these truly financially secure. The league would not again have as many as 22 teams until after the 1970 NFL–AFL merger.

=== Other team changes ===
In 1927 the NFL did absorb and integrate one complete franchise — the New York Yankees, owned by sports entertainment promoter C. C. Pyle and legendary back Red Grange — from the defunct American Football League. The rival league had been founded in a pique by Pyle the year previously when his proposal for a New York City franchise had been rejected. A debacle involving rival Brooklyn clubs had ensued. A mulligan was granted for 1927, with Pyle's Yankees taking the place of Brooklyn.

In addition, the Buffalo Rangers returned to the Buffalo Bisons name, although the team would be short-lived, suspending operations for financial reasons after five one-sided defeats to open the 1927 season.

=== Scheduling ===
The National Football League continued to play under NCAA collegiate rules in 1927.

The league held its annual owners' meeting dealing with scheduling for the forthcoming season on July 16–17 in Green Bay, Wisconsin — home of one of the "small town" franchises that survived the April 1927 owners' meeting.

=== Rules changes ===
Official NCAA football rules were adopted at the April 1927 owners' meeting as the general laws for league play. The NFL followed the NCAA rules committee, therefore, in moving the goal posts to the end line for 1927 (where it has remained since 1974). The rationale for this move was two-fold: for safety reasons, reducing the potential for injuries on goal-line plays, as well as making the attempt for point-after-touchdown more difficult. There they would remain until the NFL, departing from college rules, returned them to the goal line in an attempt to increase scoring in 1933.

The 1927 rules also required that all offensive players moving during a "shift" play must henceforth come "to a complete stop for a period of approximately one second" and reduced the number of time-outs allowed to each team per half from four to three.

In addition, two important rules governing fumbles were changed. Beginning in 1927, lateral and backwards passes falling to the ground were to be treated the same way as an incomplete forward pass; also a punt which was "muffed" or accidentally first touched by a member of the receiving team would continue to be treated as a fumble for ball-possession purposes, but could no longer be advanced from the point of recovery by the kicking team.

While the numbering of players was not only recommended but "urged" by the Rules Committee, jersey numbers were still not officially required by rule.

=== Racial segregation ===
The league absorbed many players from defunct teams in 1927, bolstering the strength of many rosters. This influx of talent seems to have served as a pretext to force black players out of the league. Although five black players participated in the 1926 season (including future Hall of Famer Fritz Pollard), none would remain on NFL rosters for 1927.

There would be four more black players who would find a way into the league prior to 1933, after which time a color bar was established that would remain in place until 1946.

=== League headquarters ===
President Joe F. Carr, who had headed the NFL since 1921 from his home, sought out and rented permanent headquarters for the league in his home town of Columbus, Ohio. He found the Hayden Building, located at the corner of Broad and High streets, to his liking and rented to room on the 11th floor of the 13 story edifice. This became the first-ever permanent office for the National Football League.

== Teams ==
Rejoined the NFL †	Merged from 1926 AFL *
Last active season ^	Last season before hiatus, rejoined league later §

Team	Head coach(es)	Stadium
Buffalo Bisons §	Dim Batterson	Bison Stadium
Chicago Bears	George Halas	Wrigley Field
Chicago Cardinals	Guy Chamberlain	Normal Park
Cleveland Bulldogs †	Roy Andrews	Dunn Field
Dayton Triangles	Lou Mahrt	Triangle Park
Duluth Eskimos ^	Ernie Nevers	Traveling team
Frankford Yellow Jackets	Charley Moran (8 games), Russ Daugherty, Charley Rogers, Ed Weir and Swede Youngstrom (10 games)	Frankford Stadium
Green Bay Packers	Curly Lambeau	City Stadium
New York Giants	Earl Potteiger	Polo Grounds
New York Yankees *	Ralph Scott	Yankee Stadium
Pottsville Maroons	Dick Rauch	Minersville Park
Providence Steam Roller	Jimmy Conzelman	Cycledrome

== Standings ==
No championship game was played in 1927. The 1927 championship pennant was awarded by owners to the New York Giants at the February 11, 1928 league meeting.

NFL standings
	W	L	T	PCT	PF	PA	STK
New York Giants	11	1	1	.917	197	20	W9
Green Bay Packers	7	2	1	.778	113	43	W1
Chicago Bears	9	3	2	.750	149	98	W2
Cleveland Bulldogs	8	4	1	.667	209	107	W5
Providence Steam Roller	8	5	1	.615	105	88	W3
New York Yankees	7	8	1	.467	142	174	L4
Frankford Yellow Jackets	6	9	3	.400	152	166	L1
Pottsville Maroons	5	8	0	.385	80	163	L1
Chicago Cardinals	3	7	1	.300	69	134	L1
Dayton Triangles	1	6	1	.143	15	57	L4
Duluth Eskimos	1	8	0	.111	68	134	L7
Buffalo Bisons	0	5	0	.000	8	123	L5

Note: Tie games were not officially counted in the standings until 1972.

== Championship race ==
After seven weeks, the Chicago Bears were unbeaten at 5–0–1, followed by the once-beaten New York Giants (6–1–1) and Green Bay Packers (5–1–1). Two games played in New York City on Tuesday, November 8, changed the standings. The New York Yankees handed the Bears a 26–6 defeat, while the Giants beat Providence, 25–0. At 7–1–1, the Giants were in first place, while the Bears and Packers were tied for second (5–1–1). On November 20, the Bears beat the visiting Packers, 14–6, and, at 7–1–1, were within striking distance of the 8–1–1 Giants. Thanksgiving Day, however, saw the Bears lose at Wrigley Field to their crosstown rivals, the Chicago Cardinals.

With three games left, the most important game of the regular season took place on November 27, at the Polo Grounds, where 15,000 turned out to watch the Bears (7–2–1) face the Giants (8–1–1). A Bears' win would have tied the teams for first place, but the Giants won, 13–7. The New York Giants and New York Yankees closed their seasons with a two-game series. At home at the Polo Grounds, the Giants beat the Yankees 14–0 to clinch the title on December 4, and then beat them again at the old Yankee Stadium on December 11, to finish at 11–1–1.

The New York Giants were named the NFL champions after finishing the season with the best record. The Giants performance was notable, particularly on defense. They allowed only 20 points in 13 games, including 10 shutout victories.

== Post-season summary ==
Back Jack McBride of the New York Giants was chosen as the Most Valuable Player of the National Football League for 1927, handily topping teammate Hinkey Haines and the injured Red Grange of the Chicago Bears.

The Green Bay Press Gazette, one of the most NFL-friendly daily newspapers of the league's early era, named its own All Pro team for 1927. Included were ends Lavvie Dilweg of the Packers and Cal Hubbard of the Giants; tackles Gus Sonnenberg of Providence and Ed Weir of Frankford; New York guards Mike Michalske of the Yankees and Steve Owen of the Giants; Cleveland center Clyde Smith; quarterback Benny Friedman of Cleveland; halfbacks Verne Lewellen of Green Bay and Paddy Driscoll of the Bears; and fullback Ernie Nevers of Duluth.

One team did not complete its schedule during the 1927 NFL season — the Buffalo Bisons were outscored 123–8 in losing their first five games and terminated operations. League President Joe F. Carr expressed hope that Ernie Nevers' Duluth Eskimos would change their name and move to Buffalo to take up the Bills' banner for 1928. While this scenario was published in the Buffalo press, it was news to Ray Weil, Bisons' president and holder of the NFL's franchise for the city, who expressed hope for a new start for his Bisons in Buffalo in the coming year. Ultimately, neither Duluth nor Buffalo fielded an NFL team for the 1928 season.

President Carr indicated that NFL attendance for 1927 was the best in league history. "Attendance in every city showed a healthy increase over that of the previous year, particularly in New York," Carr said. "Plans are going ahead to strengthen the make-up of the league, but I doubt if the league will be spread out to included a greater number than 12, which appears to be the logical number for our organization," Carr continued.

Wilfrid Smith in the Chicago Tribune wrote that "the reduction formed a more compact circuit and provided better competition." Smith opined that the "outstanding feature" of the 1927 NFL season was the debut of University of Michigan passing star Benny Friedman, who became one of the game's "best drawing cards." Fittingly, the Cleveland-born Friedman was tapped — and handsomely paid — to become the field general of the reincarnated Cleveland Bulldogs franchise.

== See also ==
- 1927 All-Pro Team
