= Duluth Eskimos =

Defunct NFL team in Minnesota (1923–1927)

Logo

General information
- Founded: 1923
- Folded: 1927
- Stadium: Athletic Park, Traveling team
- Headquartered: Duluth, Minnesota, United States
- Colors: Red, white (Duluth Kelleys) Midnight blue, white (Duluth Eskimos)

Personnel
- Owner: Ole Haugsrud
- Head coach: Joey Sternaman (1923); Dewey Scanlon (1924–1926); Ernie Nevers (1927)

Team history
- Duluth Kelleys (1923–1925); Duluth Eskimos (1926–1927); Orange Tornadoes (1929); Newark Tornadoes (1930)

League / conference affiliations
- National Football League

The Duluth Eskimos were a professional football team from Duluth, Minnesota, in the National Football League (NFL). After spending most of their time as a traveling team, they withdrew from the league after the 1927 season.

A distinction of the Eskimos is they were one of the first NFL teams to use a logo.

== History ==
=== Initial formation ===
The team initially formed in 1923 as the Kelleys (officially the Kelley Duluths, after the Kelley-Duluth Hardware Store). The team joined the National Football League on July 28, 1923. The team was put together by Kelley-Duluth Hardware store manager Marshall C. Gebert with the help of Dewey Scanlon, a college graduate who played football at Valparaiso University in Indiana.

The Kelleys, residing in the northernmost city in the NFL at the time, had the disadvantage of not being able to play at home during late November and early December, due to the harsh winters in northern Minnesota. This meant that Duluth either played unusually short seasons (they played only 16 games in three years as the Kelleys—seven in 1923, six in 1924 and three in 1925) or had to play on the road (as the Eskimos did, which allowed them to have much longer schedules). Duluth's best season came in 1924, when the Kelleys went 5–1, putting the Kelleys in fourth place.

=== Team renames ===
The Kelleys lost their name sponsorship in 1926, but signed star running back Ernie Nevers. The team renamed themselves Ernie Nevers's Eskimos in response to these developments. The 1926 NFL season saw an increased emphasis on traveling teams: the Los Angeles Buccaneers represented the West Coast, the Louisville Colonels represented the Southeast, and the Buffalo Rangers represented Texas and the Desert Southwest. The Eskimos joined in on the trend, becoming a traveling team (assumably representing the far northern states) and allowing themselves to play a far longer season than the Kelleys did. After one home game at the beginning of the 1926 season, the Eskimos never played in Duluth again. The team finished in the middle of the NFL standings in 1926, prompting the Eskimos to continue the traveling team setup. In 1927, the results were far more negative: winning only one game. Owner Ole Haugsrud then sold the team back to the league at the end of the season. Haugsrud was able to buy 10% of the Minnesota Vikings (90% of the team was owned by an ownership group that had originally planned to launch a separate team in the American Football League).

=== Later years ===
Due to various transactions, the Kelleys/Eskimos have a tenuous link to the modern NFL. Edwin Simandl, a promoter in Orange, New Jersey; bought the defunct franchise on July 27, 1929, for the 1929 season and used it to promote his decades-old Orange Tornadoes to the major leagues. Since the franchise had been dormant for a year, the NFL did not consider the Tornadoes to be the successors of the Eskimos. The Tornadoes moved to Newark for the 1930 season before going back to the minors. When Simandl handed his NFL franchise rights back to the league, it was understood that the first new expansion team of the 1931 season would receive the Tornadoes' old franchise. Because of the Great Depression, no buyer was found, and the franchise played as the league-operated Cleveland Indians for the 1931 season.

In 1932, a Boston group headed by George Preston Marshall received the next expansion franchise; strong circumstantial evidence indicates that it was awarded the assets of the failed Tornadoes organization. For instance, in 1974, Haugsrud wrote Halas and recalled that the Eskimos were relaunched in New Jersey as the Tornadoes, and that franchise was ultimately sold to Marshall's group. This group used it to start the Boston Braves. In 1933, the team was renamed the Redskins, and in 1937 it moved to Washington, D.C. where it still plays as the Washington Commanders. However, due to the two-year period of dormancy, the Commanders and the NFL consider the Boston/Washington franchise as a separate organization dating to 1932, and not as a continuation of the Tornadoes nor the Eskimos/Kelleys.

A second, unrelated, Duluth football team carried the "Eskimos" name, and played at the Northwest Football League in 1936.

== Legacy ==
The 2008 film Leatherheads is partially based on the story of the Duluth Eskimos.

On May 18, 2015, local lawmakers of one town in the Duluth-Superior area passed a motion to bring the NFL back to the region via team relocation and also voted in favor of an outdoor football stadium despite no current means of financing it. It is unclear if their proposal was ever formally submitted to the NFL.

== Pro Football Hall of Famers ==
Duluth Eskimos Hall of Famers
Players
No.	Name	Position	Tenure	Inducted
—	Johnny Blood	HB	1926–1927	1963
—	Walt Kiesling	G/T	1926–1927	1966
—	Ernie Nevers	FB; Coach	1926–1927	1963

== Season-by-season ==
	Year	W	L	T	Finish	Coach
Kelleys	1923	4	3	0	7th	Joey Sternaman
Kelleys	1924	5	1	0	4th	Dewey Scanlon
Kelleys	1925	0	3	0	16th	Dewey Scanlon
Eskimos	1926	6	5	3	8th	Dewey Scanlon
Eskimos	1927	1	8	0	11th	Ernie Nevers
