= 1929 Minneapolis Red Jackets season =

National Football League team season

- Head coach: Herb Joesting
- Home stadium: Nicollet Park

Results
- Record: 1–9
- League place: 11th in NFL

The 1929 Minneapolis Red Jackets season was their fifth in the league and first as the Red Jackets. The team improved on their previous output of 0–6, winning one game. They finished 11th in the league. Prior to this season, the Red Jackets were the Minneapolis Marines.

== Schedule ==
Game	Date	Opponent	Result	Record	Venue	Attendance	Recap	Sources
1	September 22	vs. Chicago Bears	L 6–19	0–1	Breese Stevens Field (Madison, WI)	6,000	Recap	
—	September 29	(open date)						
2	October 6	Chicago Bears	L 6–7	0–2	Nicollet Park	6,000	Recap	
3	October 13	Chicago Cardinals	W 14–7	1–2	Nicollet Park	10,000	Recap	
4	October 20	at Green Bay Packers	L 0–24	1–3	City Stadium	6,000	Recap	
5	October 27	at Chicago Bears	L 0–27	1–4	Wrigley Field	9,500	Recap	
6	November 3	Green Bay Packers	L 6–16	1–5	Nicollet Park	3,000	Recap	
7	November 10	at Chicago Cardinals	L 0–8	1–6	Comiskey Park	1,000	Recap	
8	November 17	at Providence Steam Roller	L 16–19	1–7	Cycledrome	8,500	Recap	
9	November 23	at Frankford Yellow Jackets	L 0–24	1–8	Frankford Stadium	5,000	Recap	
10	November 24	at Staten Island Stapletons	L 0–34	1–9	Thompson Stadium	2,000	Recap	
Note: November 23: Saturday

== Standings ==
NFL standings
	W	L	T	PCT	PF	PA	STK
Green Bay Packers	12	0	1	1.000	198	22	W2
New York Giants	13	1	1	.929	312	86	W4
Frankford Yellow Jackets	10	4	5	.714	129	128	W1
Chicago Cardinals	6	6	1	.500	154	83	W1
Boston Bulldogs	4	4	0	.500	98	73	L1
Staten Island Stapletons	3	4	3	.429	89	65	L2
Providence Steam Roller	4	6	2	.400	107	117	L1
Orange Tornadoes	3	5	4	.375	35	80	L1
Chicago Bears	4	9	2	.308	119	227	L1
Buffalo Bisons	1	7	1	.125	48	142	W1
Minneapolis Red Jackets	1	9	0	.100	48	185	L7
Dayton Triangles	0	6	0	.000	7	136	L6

Note: Tie games were not officially counted in the standings until 1972.

== Roster ==
- Joseph Chrape
- Hal Erickson
- John Fahay
- Herb Franta
- Frank Gause
- Ken Haycraft
- Herb Joesting
- Fritz Loven
- Bob Lundell
- LaDue Lurth
- Al Maeder
- Tony Mehelich (August 4, 1906 – May 20, 1972), guard (8 games), St. Mary's College (MN)
- Mally Nydahl
- Ben Oas
- Arnie Sandberg
- Rube Ursella
- Chet Widerquist
- Henry Willegale
- Lee Wilson
- Sam Young
