= NFL on Thanksgiving Day =

National Football League games in the US

The NFL Thanksgiving logo used since the 2022 NFL season. The logo commemorates legendary Pro Football Hall of Fame head coach and broadcaster John Madden; his signature is to the right of the logo.

Since its inception in 1920, the National Football League (NFL) has played games on Thanksgiving Day, patterned upon the historic playing of college football games on or around the November holiday. The NFL's Thanksgiving Day games have traditionally included one game hosted by the Detroit Lions since 1934 and one game hosted by the Dallas Cowboys since 1966 (with two exceptions in 1975 and 1977). Since 2006, a third game has also been played in prime time on Thanksgiving night. Unlike the two afternoon games, this game has no fixed teams.

In 2001, the NFL began branding the games as the Thanksgiving Classic. In 2022, the league named the series the John Madden Thanksgiving Celebration in honor of former head coach and broadcaster John Madden, who died in December 2021.

The NFL's Thanksgiving games are regularly the league's most-watched regular-season games. All three of the games played in 2025 set NFL regular-season viewership records; the Kansas City Chiefs–Dallas Cowboys game broadcast on CBS and streamer Paramount+ stands as the most-watched NFL regular season game of all time (57.2 million viewers).

== History ==
=== Before the NFL ===
The concept of American football games being played on Thanksgiving Day dates back to 1876, shortly after the game had been invented, as it was a day that most people were off work. In that year, the college football teams at Yale and Princeton began an annual tradition of playing each other on Thanksgiving Day. The University of Michigan also made it a tradition to play annual Thanksgiving games, holding 19 such games from 1885 to 1905. The Thanksgiving Day games between Michigan and the Chicago Maroons in the 1890s have been cited as "The Beginning of Thanksgiving Day Football." In some areas, most commonly in New England, high school teams play on Thanksgiving, typically to wrap up the regular season.

By the time football had become a professional event, playing on Thanksgiving had already become an institution. Records of pro football being played on Thanksgiving date back to as early as the 1890s, with the first pro–am team, the Allegheny Athletic Association of Pittsburgh, Pennsylvania. In 1902, the National Football League, a Major League Baseball-backed organization based entirely in Pennsylvania and unrelated to the current NFL, attempted to settle its championship over Thanksgiving weekend. After the game ended in a tie, all three teams in the league eventually claimed to have won the title.

Members of the Ohio League, during its early years, usually placed their marquee matchups on Thanksgiving Day. For instance, in 1905 and 1906, the Latrobe Athletic Association and Canton Bulldogs, considered at the time to be two of the best teams in professional football (along with the Massillon Tigers), played on Thanksgiving. A rigging scandal with the Tigers leading up to the 1906 game resulted in severe drops in attendance for the Bulldogs and ultimately caused their suspension of operations.

In the 1910s, the Ohio League stopped holding Thanksgiving games because many of its players coached high school teams and were unavailable. This was not the case in other regional circuits. In 1919, the New York Pro Football League featured a Thanksgiving matchup between the Buffalo Prospects and the Rochester Jeffersons. The game ended in a scoreless tie, leading to a rematch the next Sunday for the league championship.

=== The pioneer NFL and Thanksgiving Day games ===
Several other NFL teams played regularly on Thanksgiving in the first eighteen years of the league, including the Chicago Bears and Chicago Cardinals (1922–1933; the Bears played the Lions from 1934 to 1938 while the Cardinals switched to the Green Bay Packers for 1934 and 1935), Frankford Yellow Jackets, Pottsville Maroons, Buffalo All-Americans, Canton Bulldogs (even after the team moved to Cleveland they played the 1924 Thanksgiving game in Canton), Akron Pros (1920–1926, most commonly as Canton's rival) and the New York Giants (1929–1938, who always played a crosstown rival).

The first owner of the Lions, George A. Richards, started the tradition of the Thanksgiving Day game as a gimmick to get people to go to Lions football games, and to continue a tradition begun by the city's previous NFL teams. What differentiated the Lions' efforts from other teams which played on the holiday was that Richards owned radio station WJR, a major affiliate of the NBC Blue Network (the forerunner to today's American Broadcasting Company); he was able to negotiate an agreement with NBC to carry his Thanksgiving games live across the network.

During the Franksgiving controversy in 1939 and 1940, the only two teams to play the game were the Pittsburgh Steelers and Philadelphia Eagles, as both teams were in the same state (Pennsylvania). (At the time, then-U.S. President Franklin Roosevelt wanted to move the holiday for economic reasons and many states were resistant to the move; half the states recognized the move and the other half did not. This complicated scheduling for Thanksgiving games. Incidentally, the two teams were also exploring the possibility of a merger at the time.) Due to the looming World War II and the resulting shorter seasons, the NFL did not schedule any Thanksgiving games in 1941, nor did it schedule any in the subsequent years until the war ended in 1945. When the Thanksgiving games resumed in 1945, only the Lions' annual home game would remain on the Thanksgiving holiday.

The All-America Football Conference and American Football League, both of which would later be absorbed into the NFL, also held Thanksgiving contests, although neither of those leagues had permanent hosts. Likewise, the AFL of 1926 also played two Thanksgiving games in its lone season of existence, while the AFL of 1936 hosted one in its first season, which featured the Cleveland Rams, a future NFL team, and the 1940–41 incarnation of the American Football League played two games in 1940 on the earlier "Franksgiving" date.

=== The late 20th century ===
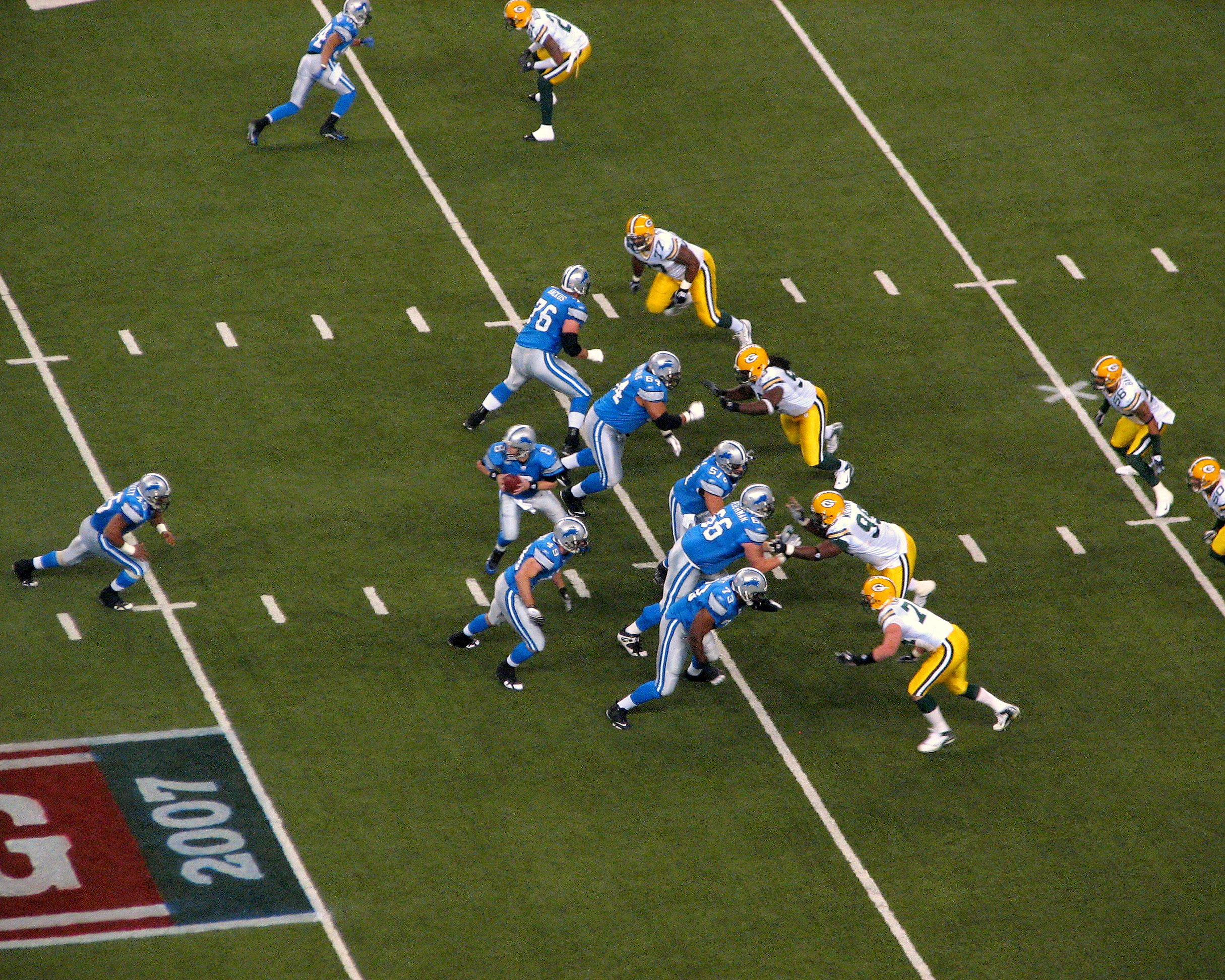
The Detroit Lions (in blue) during the 2007 Thanksgiving game against their division rival Green Bay Packers; the Detroit Lions have played on Thanksgiving since 1934.

In 1951, the Packers began a 13-season run as the perpetual opponent to the Lions each year through 1963. This pairing became popularly known as the "Yooper Bowl", since the boundary between the two teams' regional territories and fanbases runs through the Upper Peninsula of Michigan, whose denizens are known as "yoopers". Packers coach Vince Lombardi grew to loathe the contest; he felt that his team could not properly rest and prepare for, then travel to, a game in just four days' time, and he successfully petitioned the NFL to remove the Packers from its permanent slot on the holiday beginning in the 1964 season.

In 1966, the Dallas Cowboys, who had been founded six years earlier, adopted the practice of hosting Thanksgiving games. It is widely rumored that the Cowboys sought a guarantee that they would regularly host Thanksgiving games as a condition of their very first one (since games on days other than Sunday were uncommon at the time and thus high attendance was not a certainty).

This is only partly true: Dallas had in fact decided on their own to host games on Thanksgiving; team president Tex Schramm was enticed by the publicity that would come with a permanent nationally televised contest and volunteered to be host when the NFL proposed the second Thanksgiving game. Schramm also anticipated a home field advantage in that the shorter week would favor the home team because the opponent would not only lose three days of practice but additional time traveling to Dallas that the Cowboys could use to prepare.

In 1975 and 1977, at the behest of then-Commissioner Pete Rozelle, the St. Louis Cardinals replaced Dallas as a host team (Dallas then hosted St. Louis in 1976). Although the Cardinals, at the time known as the "Cardiac Cards" due to their propensity for winning very close games, were a modest success at the time, they were nowhere near as popular nationwide as the Cowboys, who were regular Super Bowl contenders during this era. This, combined with St. Louis's consistently weak attendance, a series of ugly Cardinals losses in the three-game stretch, and opposition from the Kirkwood–Webster Groves Turkey Day Game (a local high school football contest) led to Dallas resuming regular hosting duties in 1978.

With their resumption as a regular NFL Thanksgiving Day venue, the Cowboys requested and received an agreement guaranteeing the Cowboys a spot on Thanksgiving Day indefinitely.

Since 1978, Thanksgiving games have been hosted in Detroit and Dallas every year, with Detroit in the early time slot and Dallas in the late afternoon slot. Due to television network commitments in place through the 2013 season, to make sure that both the AFC-carrying network (NBC from 1965 to 1997, and CBS since 1998) and the NFC-carrying network (CBS from 1956 to 1993, and Fox since 1994) got at least one game each, one of these games was between NFC opponents, and one featured AFC-NFC opponents. Thus, the AFC could showcase only one team on Thanksgiving, and the AFC team was always the visiting team.

=== The 21st century ===
The previous NFL on Thanksgiving Day logo, used from 2008 to 2021

Since 2006, a third NFL game on Thanksgiving has been played in prime time. It originally aired on NFL Network, serving as the launch of its Thursday Night Football package. In 2012, the game moved to NBC as part of the league's new television deals. The night game has never had a dedicated host team or any conference tie-in, meaning the league can place any game into the time slot. Since NBC took over the prime time game in 2012, divisional matchups have been normally scheduled, with the exceptions being in 2016, 2021, 2022 and 2024. In 2014, a series of changes to the broadcast contracts freed CBS from its obligation to carry an AFC team, and by 2018, the last vestiges of conference ties to the Thanksgiving games were eliminated (although in practice games on Fox have remained all-NFC contests).

The originally scheduled 2020 primetime game between the Baltimore Ravens and the Pittsburgh Steelers was postponed to the following Wednesday, December 2, after multiple Ravens players and staff tested positive for COVID-19 in the days before the game. This thus marked the first time no primetime contest was held since 2005.

On November 11, 2022, the league announced that the Thanksgiving games would be branded as the "John Madden Thanksgiving Celebration", honoring the memory of head coach and broadcaster John Madden. Madden called 20 Thanksgiving games as the lead analyst for CBS Sports from 1981 to 1993 and Fox Sports from 1994 to 2001.

From 2014 to 2025, the Thursday Night Football game after Thanksgiving always featured two teams who were scheduled to play on Thanksgiving. Most of the TNF after Thanksgiving games have featured the Cowboys, although the Lions have also been scheduled thrice as well (in 2015 and 2023 against the Packers, and in 2025 against the Cowboys). During this period, the only TNF after Thanksgiving game not to feature either the Cowboys or the Lions took place in 2022, when the NFL scheduled the Buffalo Bills at the New England Patriots instead. In 2026, the NFL changed course as it scheduled the Kansas City Chiefs at the Los Angeles Rams as the TNF game after Thanksgiving. While the Chiefs were scheduled to play on the primetime Thanksgiving game, the Rams were assigned to play in the NFL's first Thanksgiving Eve game. Since the institution of permanent Christmas games into the NFL schedule in 2024, many of the teams scheduled for Thanksgiving have also been required to play the Christmas game as well; Detroit, Dallas and Kansas City played both holidays in 2025, while Buffalo and Chicago were scheduled for both in 2026. The NFL dismissed criticism of the scheduling practices: "Fans vote with their remotes."

All three of the 2025 Thanksgiving games broke NFL viewership records. The 1:00pm matchup between the Green Bay Packers and Detroit Lions reached 47.7 million viewers on Fox. The 4:30pm matchup between the Kansas City Chiefs and Dallas Cowboys became the most-watched NFL regular season game on record, drawing 57.2 million viewers. The game was broadcast on CBS and streaming service Paramount+, and peaked with 61.4 million viewers by the game's conclusion. The 8:20pm matchup between the Cincinnati Bengals and Baltimore Ravens became the most-watched Thanksgiving night game in NFL history with an average of 28.4 million viewers across NBC, Peacock, and Telemundo. The overall average viewership across all three games was 44.7 million viewers, the highest Thanksgiving Day average on record dating back to 1988. Digital streaming across platforms for all three games delivered an average minute audience of 2.2 million viewers, the highest on record for Thanksgiving Day.

In 2023, the NFL began to surround Thanksgiving Day with other tentpole games involving its streaming rightsholders; in 2023, a "Black Friday" afternoon game was added to Amazon Prime Video's Thursday Night Football package, while the 2026 season introduces a new Wednesday night game for Netflix on the night prior to Thanksgiving.

== Landmarks ==
- 1920: An urban legend states that the Chicago Tigers and Decatur Staleys challenged each other to a Thanksgiving duel in the league's inaugural season, with the loser to be relegated out of the league. Although the story is apocryphal, the Tigers did fold after the 1920 campaign and the Staleys moved to Chicago early in the 1921 season, later renaming themselves the Bears.
- 1921: In a matchup of two of the league's best teams, the Chicago Staleys lost to the Buffalo All-Americans at home. The Staleys demanded a rematch, with Buffalo agreeing to a December reprise only as an off-the-record exhibition game. Chicago won the second game, which ended up counting despite the All-Americans' insistence, controversially handing Chicago the championship.
- 1925: A Thanksgiving NFL game was played in Detroit for the first time when the league's second Motor City team, the Detroit Panthers, hosted the Rock Island Independents. The visitors won, 6–3. Meanwhile in Chicago, collegiate superstar Red Grange debuted for the Bears in a game against their crosstown rivals, the Chicago Cardinals, in front of nearly 40,000 fans.
- 1928: A third Detroit NFL franchise, the Wolverines, hosted a Thanksgiving Day game during their one and only year of existence. The team won a laugher, 33–0, over the Dayton Triangles at University of Detroit Stadium.
- 1929: The Chicago Cardinals' Ernie Nevers scored all 40 points — a record that still stands — in a 40–6 rout over their North Side foes, the Chicago Bears.
- 1934: The fourth Detroit NFL franchise, the Lions, began their Thanksgiving tradition with a game hosting the Chicago Bears. George S. Halas & Co. won 19–16 in front of 26,000 people.
- 1952: The expansion Dallas Texans were forced to move their lone remaining home game to the Rubber Bowl in Akron, Ohio due to a scheduling conflict. Their opponent, the Chicago Bears, underestimated the winless Texans and sent their second string team to the game. The resulting 27–23 upset proved to be Dallas' only victory of their existence.
- 1962: The Detroit Lions handed the 10–0 Green Bay Packers their lone defeat of the season, 26–14. The game was dubbed the "Thanksgiving Day Massacre" due to the dominant performance by the Lions defense, who sacked Bart Starr 11 times. This game factored into the Packers' withdrawal from its permanent spot on the holiday after 1963.
- 1966: The Dallas Cowboys joined the Lions as annual Thanksgiving Day hosts with a defeat of the visiting Cleveland Browns, 26–14.
- 1969: In a blinding snowstorm at Tiger Stadium, the Minnesota Vikings blanked the Lions 27–0, featuring an interception by Jim Marshall, who lateraled to Alan Page on the return, resulting in a touchdown.
- 1974: The Dallas Cowboys lost their Hall of Fame QB Roger Staubach to an injury and fell behind Washington. Then the team's backup, an unknown and untested youngster named Clint Longley, led a furious 4th-quarter comeback that saw Dallas pull off a stunning 24-23 victory.
- 1976: The Buffalo Bills managed both best and worst offensive performances in the history of NFL Thanksgiving football when O. J. Simpson ran for 273 yards, an NFL record. Bills reserve quarterback Gary Marangi made history of another sort, completing only 4 of 21 pass attempts for 29 yards and a rating of just 19.7. The Lions won, 27–14.
- 1980: With the Detroit Lions and Chicago Bears tied 17–17 in the new Pontiac Silverdome at the end of regulation, the first Thanksgiving overtime game was born. Speedy Bear Dave Williams returned the opening kickoff 95 yards in 13 seconds for a game-winning touchdown, setting a record for the shortest overtime period in NFL history.
- 1989: In what was known as the "Bounty Bowl", the Philadelphia Eagles crushed the Dallas Cowboys by a score of 27–0. Allegations surfaced that the Eagles had placed a bounty on the Cowboys kicker, thus becoming the first of a string of three bitterly contested games between the two teams, the other two being Bounty Bowl II and the Porkchop Bowl a year later.
- 1993: Cowboy defensive lineman Leon Lett gained fifteen minutes of national infamy when in the final seconds he accidentally turned an apparently game-winning field goal block into a fumble by touching the spinning football and moving it forward. Given a second chance from point blank range, Miami Dolphins kicker Pete Stoyanovich knocked it through for a 16–14 win.
- 1998: Remembered in football lore as "The Coin Toss game". As the Pittsburgh Steelers and Detroit Lions went to overtime tied 16–16, Pittsburgh's Jerome Bettis called the coin flip by saying both heads and tails. However, head referee Phil Luckett declared Detroit the winner of the toss on live television. The Lions elected to receive and quickly drove down the field to kick a game-winning field goal on their first possession. Later that day in Dallas, Vikings wide receiver Randy Moss would show a national audience why he was headed for 1st-team All Pro status as a rookie by catching 3 passes for 163 yards and 3 touchdowns (all of them being 50 or more yards) while also catching a two-point conversion in Minnesota's win. The game was personal for Moss as the Cowboys had passed on him in the 1998 NFL draft.
- 2008: In one of the greatest mismatches of the Thanksgiving series, the 10–1 Tennessee Titans annihilated the 0–11 Lions, 47–10. Detroit would go on to become the 33rd winless team in NFL history and the first ever to lose 16 games.
- 2011: The trio of games was lauded as one of the better Thanksgiving Day slates in the series with Green Bay defeating Detroit 27-15, Dallas edging Miami 20-19 and Baltimore beating San Francisco 16-6. In the nightcap head coaching brothers John Harbaugh of the Ravens and Jim Harbaugh of the 49ers matched wits in a preview of 2012's Super Bowl XLVII.
- 2012: In the infamous Butt Fumble game, New York Jets quarterback Mark Sanchez ran headfirst into the buttocks of his own offensive lineman, guard Brandon Moore. The New England Patriots returned the fumble for a touchdown and would go on to win 49–19 in blowout fashion.
- 2013: In a game against the Baltimore Ravens, Pittsburgh Steelers head coach Mike Tomlin became the subject of controversy when video replay showed him apparently interfering with a kick return from Jacoby Jones and stopping a probable touchdown as he stood on the sideline. No penalty was called on Tomlin, but the Steelers would still go on to lose, 22–20. Tomlin was later fined $100,000 for his actions by the NFL.
- 2022: In the "23 Seconds Game", an homage to the 13 Seconds playoff game the year before, the Buffalo Bills defeated the Detroit Lions when with 23 seconds on the clock they ran a 21-second field goal drive. Tyler Bass hit a walk-off 28–25 game winner for the favored Bills.
- 2023: During a blowout 45–10 win over the Washington Commanders, Cowboys cornerback DaRon Bland recorded his fifth interception returned for a touchdown on the season, breaking the NFL record.
- 2024: After trailing 23–7, the Bears came within three points of the Lions and were driving to tie the game or even pull off the upset. However, Chicago rookie quarterback Caleb Williams and head coach Matt Eberflus mismanaged the clock in the last 34 seconds: with one time-out remaining, the clock running, and just outside field goal range on third down, the Bears opted to attempt one additional play with the hopes of improving field position, calling a time-out, and making the game-tying field goal attempt, but setting into formation and executing the third-down play ended up taking too much time and ran out the clock, preserving Detroit's first Thanksgiving win since 2016. Meanwhile, it was the Bears' sixth consecutive loss, prompting management to make the franchise's first-ever release of a head coach midseason as it parted ways with Matt Eberflus the following day.

== Throwback uniforms ==
Since 2001, teams playing on Thanksgiving have worn throwback uniforms on numerous occasions. In 2002, it extended to nearly all games of the weekend, and in some cases also involved classic field logos at the stadiums.

In 2001–2004, and again in 2008, 2010, 2017, 2018, 2020, 2023 and 2025, the Detroit Lions have worn throwback uniforms based on their very early years. For 2019 and 2022, Detroit wore its silver Color Rush uniforms.

From 2001 to 2003, Dallas chose to represent the 1990s Cowboys dynasty by wearing the navy "Double-Star" jersey not seen since 1995. In 2004, the team wore uniforms not seen since 1963. In 2009, to celebrate the 50th anniversary of the AFL, both Dallas and Oakland played in a "AFL Legacy Game." In 2013, the Cowboys intended to wear their 1960s throwbacks, but chose not to do so after the NFL adopted a new policy requiring players and teams to utilize only one helmet a season to address the league's new concussion protocol. Rather than have an incomplete throwback look, the Cowboys instead wore their standard blue jerseys at home for the first time since 1963. In 2015, the Cowboys resurrected their 1994 white "Double-Star" jerseys only this time wore them with white pants as part of the league's Color Rush, a trial run of specially designed, monochromatic jerseys to be worn during Thursday games. In 2022, after the NFL lifted the one-helmet rule, the Cowboys resumed wearing the throwback navy "Double-Star" jerseys on Thanksgiving.

== Home team controversy ==
It has remained a tradition for the Detroit Lions and Dallas Cowboys to host the afternoon games dating several decades. Other teams eventually expressed interest in hosting Thanksgiving Day games. Lamar Hunt, the former owner of the Chiefs (who had hosted Thanksgiving Day games from 1967 to 1969 as an AFL team prior to the merger), lobbied heavily in favor of his team hosting a game on the holiday. When the NFL adopted a third, prime time game, the Chiefs were selected as the first team to host such a contest.

The host issue came to a head in 2008, focusing particularly on the winless Lions. Going into the game, the Lions had lost their last four Thanksgiving Day games, and opinions amongst the media had suggested removing the Lions and replacing them with a more attractive matchup. The team also required an extension to prevent a local television blackout. The Lions were routed by the Tennessee Titans 47–10, en route to the team's 0–16 season. NFL commissioner Roger Goodell confirmed that the Lions would stay on Thanksgiving Day for the 2009 season, but kept the issue open to revisit in the future. However, with the resurgence of the Lions in the 2020s, these calls have all but disappeared.

Conversely, the Dallas Cowboys, who typically represent a larger television draw, have had far fewer public calls to be replaced on Thanksgiving Day. One issue that has been debated is a perceived unfair advantage of playing at home on Thanksgiving Day. The advantage is given in the form of an extra day of practice for the home team while the road team has to travel to the game site. This is true for most Thursday games, but with the night games, the visitor can travel to the game site after practice on Wednesday and hold the final walkthrough the following morning.

With the introduction of the prime time game, which effectively allows all teams in the league an opportunity to play on Thanksgiving Day, along with the introduction of year-long Thursday Night Football ensuring all teams have one Thursday game during the regular season (thus negating any on-field advantages or disadvantages to being selected for Thanksgiving Day), the calls for the Lions and the Cowboys to be removed have diminished. Commissioner Roger Goodell stated in 2025 that he did not anticipate making any changes to the permanent hosting for the foreseeable future.

== Broadcasting ==
DuMont was the first network to televise Thanksgiving Day games in 1953; CBS took over in 1956, and in 1965, the first color television broadcast of an NFL game was the Thanksgiving Day match between the Lions and the Baltimore Colts.

Starting in 1970, the Detroit "early" game and the Dallas "late" game initially rotated annually as intra-conference (NFC at NFC) and inter-conference (AFC at NFC) games. This was to satisfy the then-television contract balance between the network holding the rights to the "AFC package" and televised inter-conference games in which the visiting team is from the AFC (NBC from 1970 to 1997, and CBS since 1998) and the network with the "NFC package" (CBS from 1970 to 1993, and Fox since 1994).

In 1981, John Madden began a 20-year tradition of broadcasting Thanksgiving games on CBS through 1993, and later on Fox beginning in 1994. Part of his annual Thanksgiving tradition involved awarding a turkey drumstick to the game's MVP beginning with Reggie White in 1989. Following a 1990 comment regarding needing more drumsticks for the Dallas Cowboys' offensive line, a Texas barbecue owner created a six-legged turkey for his broadcast. His tradition expanded again in 1997 with the introduction of the turducken. Madden's tenure of broadcasting Thanksgiving games ended in 2002.

In 2006, the third game in primetime originally aired on the NFL Network. In 2012, NBC took over broadcasting the primetime game, and ever since all three broadcast networks with Sunday NFL rights carry one Thanksgiving Day game apiece. The first two games continue to be split between CBS and Fox, with CBS getting the Detroit "early" game, and Fox getting Dallas "late" game in even-numbered years, and with Fox getting the Detroit "early" game and CBS getting the Dallas "late" game in odd-numbered years.

In 2014, a system known as "cross-flex" was introduced, in which the two networks bound by conference restrictions, CBS and Fox, could carry games from the other conference as part of their Sunday afternoon package, including the potential for CBS to broadcast an NFC vs. NFC game on Thanksgiving Day. From that year until 2016, CBS carried all-NFC contests every year on Thanksgiving Day, and in 2014, 2015, 2018, and 2023, no AFC teams played in any of the Thanksgiving Day games. To date, the NFL has never assigned an AFC road game to Fox on Thanksgiving Day.

During his first season as an NFL broadcaster in 2024, Tom Brady was introduced to turducken during the FOX broadcast between the Giants and Cowboys. Brady wondered how the chicken and duck got roped into the turkey, and sampled the dish. Brady was impressed with the flavor, and said "That's amazing!" While he enjoyed the dish on-air, skeptics debated whether he ate the full combo or just a turkey leg, with some viewers joking he was "boomed" by how good it tasted, noting he appeared to only eat the turkey leg rather than the full, stuffed chicken/duck/turkey combination.

Westwood One most recently held national radio broadcast rights to all three games, with Compass Media Networks sharing rights to the Cowboys contest. (Under league rules, only radio stations that carry at least 12 Cowboys games in a season are allowed to carry the Compass broadcast.) The participating teams also air the games on their local flagship stations and regional radio networks.

While the Lions’ Thanksgiving Day game is usually in the top five, the Cowboys' Thanksgiving Day game has regularly been the most watched NFL regular season telecast each year.

== Game results ==
=== 1920–1940 ===
- All three of the generally recognized iterations of the American Football League that played during this era (AFL I in 1926, AFL II in 1936 and AFL III in 1940) played Thanksgiving Day games, which are also listed as indicated.
- Non-NFL team games between league teams and non league teams counted in the 1920 standings. The All-Tonawanda Lumberjacks later joined the league as the Tonawanda Kardex, albeit only for one game.
- Thanksgiving Day fell on the final Thursday in November until 1938 and was held on two conflicting days from 1939 to 1941.
- The Detroit Lions started playing their traditional series in 1934.

Season	Date	Visiting team		Home team		Game notes
1920	November 25	Canton Bulldogs	0	Akron Pros	7	
1920	November 25	Decatur Staleys	6	Chicago Tigers	0	
1920	November 25	Detroit Heralds	0	Dayton Triangles	28	
1920	November 25	Columbus Panhandles	0	Elyria Athletics*	0	
1920	November 25	Hammond Pros	0	Chicago Boosters*	27	
1920	November 25	All-Tonawanda *	14	Rochester Jeffersons	3	
1921	November 24	Canton Bulldogs	14	Akron Pros	0	
1921	November 24	Buffalo All-Americans	7	Chicago Staleys	6	Precursor to championship controversy
1922	November 30	Buffalo All-Americans	21	Rochester Jeffersons	0	
1922	November 30	Chicago Bears	0	Chicago Cardinals	6	Rivalry
1922	November 30	Milwaukee Badgers	0	Racine Legion	3	Local rivalry
1922	November 30	Oorang Indians	18	Columbus Panhandles	6	
1922	November 30	Akron Pros	0	Canton Bulldogs	14	
1923	November 29	Toledo Maroons	0	Canton Bulldogs	28	
1923	November 29	Chicago Cardinals	0	Chicago Bears	3	Rivalry
1923	November 29	Hammond Pros	0	Green Bay Packers	19	
1923	November 29	Milwaukee Badgers	16	Racine Legion	0	
1924	November 27	Buffalo Bisons	0	Akron Pros	22	
1924	November 27	Chicago Bears	21	Chicago Cardinals	0	Rivalry
1924	November 27	Dayton Triangles	7	Frankford Yellow Jackets	32	
1924	November 27	Milwaukee Badgers	10	Cleveland Bulldogs (Note: Game played in Canton, Ohio)	53	
1924	November 27	Green Bay Packers	17	Kansas City Blues	6	
1925	November 26	Chicago Cardinals	0	Chicago Bears	0	Rivalry
1925	November 26	Kansas City Cowboys	17	Cleveland Bulldogs (Note: Game played in Hartford, Connecticut)	0	
1925	November 26	Rock Island Independents	6	Detroit Panthers	3	
1925	November 26	Green Bay Packers	0	Pottsville Maroons	31	
1926	November 25	New York Giants	17	Brooklyn Lions	0	City rivalry
1926	November 25	Los Angeles Buccaneers	9	Detroit Panthers	6	
1926	November 25	Chicago Cardinals	0	Chicago Bears	0	Rivalry
1926	November 25	Green Bay Packers	14	Frankford Yellow Jackets	20	
1926	November 25	Providence Steam Roller	0	Pottsville Maroons	8	
1926	November 25	Akron Pros	0	Canton Bulldogs	0	
1926	November 25	(AFL I) Los Angeles Wildcats	0	Chicago Bulls	0	
1926	November 25	(AFL I) Philadelphia Quakers	13	New York Yankees	10	
1927	November 24	Chicago Cardinals	3	Chicago Bears	0	Rivalry
1927	November 24	Providence Steam Roller	0	Pottsville Maroons	6	
1927	November 24	Green Bay Packers	17	Frankford Yellow Jackets	9	
1927	November 24	Cleveland Bulldogs	30	New York Yankees	19	
1928	November 29	Providence Steam Roller	7	Pottsville Maroons	0	
1928	November 29	Dayton Triangles	0	Detroit Wolverines	33	
1928	November 29	Green Bay Packers	0	Frankford Yellow Jackets	2	
1928	November 29	Chicago Cardinals	0	Chicago Bears	34	Rivalry
1929	November 28	New York Giants	21	Staten Island Stapletons	7	City rivalry
1929	November 28	Green Bay Packers	0	Frankford Yellow Jackets	0	
1929	November 28	Chicago Cardinals	40	Chicago Bears	6	Rivalry
1930	November 27	New York Giants	6	Staten Island Stapletons	7	City rivalry
1930	November 27	Providence Steam Roller	12	Brooklyn Dodgers	33	
1930	November 27	Green Bay Packers	25	Frankford Yellow Jackets	7	
1930	November 27	Chicago Cardinals	0	Chicago Bears	6	Rivalry
1931	November 26	Green Bay Packers	38	Providence Steam Roller	7	
1931	November 26	New York Giants	6	Staten Island Stapletons	9	City rivalry
1931	November 26	Chicago Cardinals	7	Chicago Bears	18	Rivalry
1932	November 24	Green Bay Packers	7	Brooklyn Dodgers	0	
1932	November 24	New York Giants	13	Staten Island Stapletons	13	City rivalry
1932	November 24	Chicago Cardinals	0	Chicago Bears	24	Rivalry
1933	November 30	New York Giants	10	Brooklyn Dodgers	0	City rivalry
1933	November 30	Chicago Bears	22	Chicago Cardinals	6	Rivalry
1934	November 29	Green Bay Packers	0	Chicago Cardinals	6	
1934	November 29	New York Giants	27	Brooklyn Dodgers	0	City rivalry
1934	November 29	Chicago Bears	19	Detroit Lions	16	Rivalry
1935	November 28	Green Bay Packers	7	Chicago Cardinals	9	
1935	November 28	New York Giants	21	Brooklyn Dodgers	0	City rivalry
1935	November 28	Chicago Bears	2	Detroit Lions	14	Rivalry
1936	November 26	Chicago Bears	7	Detroit Lions	13	Rivalry
1936	November 26	New York Giants	14	Brooklyn Dodgers	0	City rivalry
1936	November 26	(AFL II) Cleveland Rams	7	Rochester Tigers	6	
1937	November 25	Chicago Bears	13	Detroit Lions	0	Rivalry
1937	November 25	New York Giants	13	Brooklyn Dodgers	13	City rivalry
1938	November 24	Chicago Bears	7	Detroit Lions	14	Rivalry
1938	November 24	New York Giants	7	Brooklyn Dodgers	7	City rivalry
1939	November 23	Pittsburgh Pirates	14	Philadelphia Eagles	17	Rivalry
1940	November 21	(AFL III) New York Yankees	16	Columbus Bullies	17	
1940	November 21	(AFL III) Buffalo Tigers	13	Milwaukee Chiefs	30	
1940	November 28	Pittsburgh Steelers	0	Philadelphia Eagles	7	Rivalry

=== 1945–1959 ===
- No Thanksgiving Day games were held from 1941 to 1944 due to World War II.
- Thanksgiving Day games were played on the fourth Thursday in November from 1945 onward.
- The All-America Football Conference (AAFC) also played Thanksgiving Day games from 1946 to 1949.

Season	Date	League	Visiting team		Home team		TV	Game notes
1945	November 22	NFL	Cleveland Rams	28	Detroit Lions	21	—N/a	
1946	November 28	NFL	Boston Yanks	34	Detroit Lions	10	—N/a	
1946	November 28	AAFC	New York Yankees	21	Brooklyn Dodgers	7	—N/a	
1947	November 27	NFL	Chicago Bears	34	Detroit Lions	14	—N/a	Rivalry
1947	November 27	AAFC	Cleveland Browns	27	Los Angeles Dons	17	—N/a	
1947	November 27	AAFC	San Francisco 49ers	21	Brooklyn Dodgers	7	—N/a	
1948	November 25	NFL	Chicago Cardinals	28	Detroit Lions	14	—N/a	
1948	November 25	AAFC	Cleveland Browns	31	Los Angeles Dons	14	—N/a	
1948	November 25	AAFC	Buffalo Bills	39	Chicago Rockets	35	—N/a	
1949	November 24	NFL	Chicago Bears	28	Detroit Lions	7	—N/a	Rivalry
1949	November 24	AAFC	New York Yankees	17	Los Angeles Dons	16	—N/a	
1949	November 24	AAFC	Cleveland Browns	14	Chicago Hornets	6	—N/a	
1950	November 23	NFL	New York Yanks	14	Detroit Lions	49	—N/a	
1950	November 23	NFL	Pittsburgh Steelers	28	Chicago Cardinals	17	—N/a	
1951	November 22	NFL	Green Bay Packers	35	Detroit Lions	52	—N/a	Rivalry
1952	November 27	NFL	Green Bay Packers	24	Detroit Lions	48	—N/a	Rivalry
1952	November 27	NFL	Chicago Bears	23	Dallas Texans (Note: Game played in Akron, Ohio)	27	—N/a	
1953	November 26	NFL	Green Bay Packers	15	Detroit Lions	34	DuMont	Rivalry
1954	November 25	NFL	Green Bay Packers	24	Detroit Lions	28	DuMont	Rivalry
1955	November 24	NFL	Green Bay Packers	10	Detroit Lions	24	DuMont	Rivalry
1956	November 22	NFL	Green Bay Packers	24	Detroit Lions	20	CBS	Rivalry
1957	November 28	NFL	Green Bay Packers	6	Detroit Lions	18	CBS	Rivalry
1958	November 27	NFL	Green Bay Packers	14	Detroit Lions	24	CBS	Rivalry
1959	November 26	NFL	Green Bay Packers	24	Detroit Lions	17	CBS	Rivalry

=== 1960–1969 ===
- The American Football League (AFL) also played Thanksgiving Day games during this decade.
- The Dallas Cowboys started playing their traditional series in 1966.

Season	Date	League	Visiting team		Home team		TV	Game notes
1960	November 24	NFL	Green Bay Packers	10	Detroit Lions	23	CBS	Rivalry
1960	November 24	AFL	Dallas Texans	35	New York Titans	41	ABC	
1961	November 23	NFL	Green Bay Packers	17	Detroit Lions	9	CBS	Rivalry
1961	November 23	AFL	Buffalo Bills	14	New York Titans	21	ABC	Rivalry
1962	November 22	NFL	Green Bay Packers	14	Detroit Lions	26	CBS	Rivalry
1962	November 22	AFL	New York Titans	46	Denver Broncos	45	ABC	
1963	November 28	NFL	Green Bay Packers	13	Detroit Lions	13	CBS	Rivalry
1963	November 28	AFL	Oakland Raiders	26	Denver Broncos	10	ABC	Rivalry
1964	November 26	NFL	Chicago Bears	27	Detroit Lions	24	CBS	Rivalry
1964	November 26	AFL	Buffalo Bills	27	San Diego Chargers	24	ABC	
1965	November 25	NFL	Baltimore Colts	24	Detroit Lions	24	CBS	
1965	November 25	AFL	Buffalo Bills	20	San Diego Chargers	20	NBC	AFL Championship rematch
1966	November 24	NFL	San Francisco 49ers	41	Detroit Lions	14	CBS	
1966	November 24	NFL	Cleveland Browns	14	Dallas Cowboys	26	CBS	
1966	November 24	AFL	Buffalo Bills	31	Oakland Raiders	10	NBC	
1967	November 23	NFL	Los Angeles Rams	31	Detroit Lions	7	CBS	
1967	November 23	NFL	St. Louis Cardinals	21	Dallas Cowboys	46	CBS	
1967	November 23	AFL	Oakland Raiders	44	Kansas City Chiefs	22	NBC	Rivalry
1967	November 23	AFL	Denver Broncos	20	San Diego Chargers	24	NBC	Rivalry
1968	November 28	NFL	Philadelphia Eagles	12	Detroit Lions	0	CBS	
1968	November 28	NFL	Washington Redskins	20	Dallas Cowboys	29	CBS	Rivalry
1968	November 28	AFL	Buffalo Bills	10	Oakland Raiders	13	NBC	
1968	November 28	AFL	Houston Oilers	10	Kansas City Chiefs	24	NBC	
1969	November 27	NFL	Minnesota Vikings	27	Detroit Lions	0	CBS	Rivalry
1969	November 27	NFL	San Francisco 49ers	24	Dallas Cowboys	24	CBS	Rivalry
1969	November 27	AFL	Denver Broncos	17	Kansas City Chiefs	31	NBC	Rivalry
1969	November 27	AFL	San Diego Chargers	21	Houston Oilers	17	NBC	

=== 1970–2005 ===
- From 1970 to 2005, two afternoon games were played on Thanksgiving Day. They were held at Detroit and Dallas (except for 1975 and 1977 when St. Louis hosted instead of Dallas--see below).
- Detroit hosted the "early" game which had a kickoff time of 12:30 p.m. EST. This was thirty minutes earlier than the typical Sunday afternoon start time of 1 p.m. This was done to reduce the chance of the two games overlapping.
- Dallas hosted the "late" game which initially had a kickoff time of 4 p.m. EST. It was moved to 4:15 p.m. EST in 1998. The Cowboys always hosted the "late" game because a 12:30 p.m. EST kick-off at Dallas would be 11:30 a.m. local time (CST), and the NFL avoided starting games before noon locally.
- The two games rotated annually as intra-conference (NFC at NFC) and inter-conference (AFC at NFC) games. This was to satisfy the then-television contract balance between the network holding the rights to the AFC package (NBC 1970–1997; CBS since 1998) and the network with the NFC package (CBS 1970–1993; Fox since 1994). Under the terms at the time, the AFC package covered games in which the visiting team was from the AFC. The NFC package covered games in which the away team was from the NFC.
- Televised halftime shows featuring major recording artists were introduced at the Dallas game in 1997 and at Detroit in 1998 (see below).
- CBS and NBC initially started their Thanksgiving Day pregame coverage thirty minutes before kickoff of their respective games, similar to their thirty-minute pregame coverage on Sunday afternoons. After Fox acquired NFL rights in 1994, and debuted the hour-long Fox NFL Sunday pregame show, they also started their hour-long (later two hours) pregame coverage at 11:30 a.m. when televising the Detroit "early" game, but kept a thirty-minute pregame show when televising the Dallas "late" game. When CBS reacquired NFL rights in 1998, they still started their The NFL Today pregame coverage at 12:00 p.m. when televising the Detroit "early" game due to the fact that their morning parade coverage ran until noon, beginning in 2026 this will likely extend to one hour (due to the games being moved from 12:30 to 1 p.m. ET starts for the Detroit game).
- Dallas was replaced by the St. Louis Cardinals as a host team in 1975 and 1977; Dallas and St. Louis faced each other at Texas Stadium in 1976. Because of the Missouri Turkey Day Game, the long-established Kirkwood–Webster Groves high school football game that takes place on Thanksgiving in St. Louis, weak fan support in St. Louis, and general national preference of the Cowboys over the historically weaker Cardinals, the Cardinals' hosting of the Thanksgiving Day game was not popular. Dallas returned to hosting the game in 1978 and has hosted since. Likewise, the Rams never played on Thanksgiving Day while in St. Louis, in part because of the Turkey Day Game and also because the Missouri State High School Activities Association held its state football championship games on Thanksgiving Day weekend at The Dome at America's Center from 1996 to 2015.
- After the NFL division realignment in 2002, no team from the AFC North could play a Thanksgiving Day game against the traditional hosts. This was because under the current rotation, the Lions and the Cowboys each play AFC North teams in years that Fox is scheduled to broadcast its Thanksgiving Day game, requiring an NFC opponent. The last game to feature a team currently in the AFC North was the Lions' matchup against Pittsburgh in 1998. This situation would be remedied with the addition of the prime time game (2006), and the introduction of cross-flexing (2014).

Season	Date	Visiting team		Home team		TV	Game notes
1970	November 26	Oakland Raiders	14	Detroit Lions	28	NBC	
1970	November 26	Green Bay Packers	3	Dallas Cowboys	16	CBS	Rivalry
1971	November 25	Kansas City Chiefs	21	Detroit Lions	32	NBC	
1971	November 25	Los Angeles Rams	21	Dallas Cowboys	28	CBS	Rivalry
1972	November 23	New York Jets	20	Detroit Lions	37	NBC	
1972	November 23	San Francisco 49ers	31	Dallas Cowboys	10	CBS	Rivalry
1973	November 22	Washington Redskins	20	Detroit Lions	0	CBS	
1973	November 22	Miami Dolphins	14	Dallas Cowboys	7	NBC	
1974	November 28	Denver Broncos	31	Detroit Lions	27	NBC	
1974	November 28	Washington Redskins	23	Dallas Cowboys	24	CBS	Rivalry
1975	November 27	Los Angeles Rams	20	Detroit Lions	0	CBS	
1975	November 27	Buffalo Bills	32	St. Louis Cardinals	14	NBC	
1976	November 25	Buffalo Bills	14	Detroit Lions	27	NBC	
1976	November 25	St. Louis Cardinals	14	Dallas Cowboys	19	CBS	
1977	November 24	Chicago Bears	31	Detroit Lions	14	CBS	Rivalry
1977	November 24	Miami Dolphins	55	St. Louis Cardinals	14	NBC	
1978	November 23	Denver Broncos	14	Detroit Lions	17	NBC	
1978	November 23	Washington Redskins	10	Dallas Cowboys	37	CBS	Rivalry
1979	November 22	Chicago Bears	0	Detroit Lions	20	CBS	Rivalry
1979	November 22	Houston Oilers	30	Dallas Cowboys	24	NBC	Governor's Cup
1980	November 27	Chicago Bears	23^{OT}	Detroit Lions	17	CBS	Rivalry
1980	November 27	Seattle Seahawks	7	Dallas Cowboys	51	NBC	
1981	November 26	Kansas City Chiefs	10	Detroit Lions	27	NBC	
1981	November 26	Chicago Bears	9	Dallas Cowboys	10	CBS	
1982	November 25	New York Giants	13	Detroit Lions	6	CBS	
1982	November 25	Cleveland Browns	14	Dallas Cowboys	31	NBC	
1983	November 24	Pittsburgh Steelers	3	Detroit Lions	45	NBC	
1983	November 24	St. Louis Cardinals	17	Dallas Cowboys	35	CBS	
1984	November 22	Green Bay Packers	28	Detroit Lions	31	CBS	Rivalry
1984	November 22	New England Patriots	17	Dallas Cowboys	20	NBC	
1985	November 28	New York Jets	20	Detroit Lions	31	NBC	
1985	November 28	St. Louis Cardinals	17	Dallas Cowboys	35	CBS	
1986	November 27	Green Bay Packers	44	Detroit Lions	40	CBS	Rivalry
1986	November 27	Seattle Seahawks	31	Dallas Cowboys	14	NBC	
1987	November 26	Kansas City Chiefs	27	Detroit Lions	20	NBC	
1987	November 26	Minnesota Vikings	44^{OT}	Dallas Cowboys	38	CBS	Rivalry
1988	November 24	Minnesota Vikings	23	Detroit Lions	0	CBS	Rivalry
1988	November 24	Houston Oilers	25	Dallas Cowboys	17	NBC	Governor's Cup
1989	November 23	Cleveland Browns	10	Detroit Lions	13	NBC	
1989	November 23	Philadelphia Eagles	27	Dallas Cowboys	0	CBS	Rivalry (Bounty Bowl I)
1990	November 22	Denver Broncos	27	Detroit Lions	40	NBC	
1990	November 22	Washington Redskins	17	Dallas Cowboys	27	CBS	Rivalry
1991	November 28	Chicago Bears	6	Detroit Lions	16	CBS	Rivalry
1991	November 28	Pittsburgh Steelers	10	Dallas Cowboys	20	NBC	Rivalry
1992	November 26	Houston Oilers	24	Detroit Lions	21	NBC	
1992	November 26	New York Giants	3	Dallas Cowboys	30	CBS	Rivalry
1993	November 25	Chicago Bears	10	Detroit Lions	6	CBS	Rivalry
1993	November 25	Miami Dolphins	16	Dallas Cowboys	14	NBC	
1994	November 24	Buffalo Bills	21	Detroit Lions	35	NBC	
1994	November 24	Green Bay Packers	31	Dallas Cowboys	42	Fox	First Thanksgiving game to air on Fox; rivalry
1995	November 23	Minnesota Vikings	38	Detroit Lions	44	Fox	Rivalry
1995	November 23	Kansas City Chiefs	12	Dallas Cowboys	24	NBC	
1996	November 28	Kansas City Chiefs	28	Detroit Lions	24	NBC	
1996	November 28	Washington Redskins	10	Dallas Cowboys	21	Fox	Rivalry
1997	November 27	Chicago Bears	20	Detroit Lions	55	Fox	Rivalry
1997	November 27	Tennessee Oilers	27	Dallas Cowboys	14	NBC	
1998	November 26	Pittsburgh Steelers	16	Detroit Lions	19^{OT}	CBS	
1998	November 26	Minnesota Vikings	46	Dallas Cowboys	36	Fox	Rivalry
1999	November 25	Chicago Bears	17	Detroit Lions	21	Fox	Rivalry
1999	November 25	Miami Dolphins	0	Dallas Cowboys	20	CBS	
2000	November 23	New England Patriots	9	Detroit Lions	34	CBS	
2000	November 23	Minnesota Vikings	27	Dallas Cowboys	15	Fox	Rivalry
2001	November 22	Green Bay Packers	29	Detroit Lions	27	Fox	Rivalry
2001	November 22	Denver Broncos	26	Dallas Cowboys	24	CBS	
2002	November 28	New England Patriots	20	Detroit Lions	12	CBS	
2002	November 28	Washington Redskins	20	Dallas Cowboys	27	Fox	Rivalry
2003	November 27	Green Bay Packers	14	Detroit Lions	22	Fox	Rivalry
2003	November 27	Miami Dolphins	40	Dallas Cowboys	21	CBS	
2004	November 25	Indianapolis Colts	41	Detroit Lions	9	CBS	
2004	November 25	Chicago Bears	7	Dallas Cowboys	21	Fox	
2005	November 24	Atlanta Falcons	27	Detroit Lions	7	Fox	
2005	November 24	Denver Broncos	24^{OT}	Dallas Cowboys	21	CBS	

=== 2006–present ===
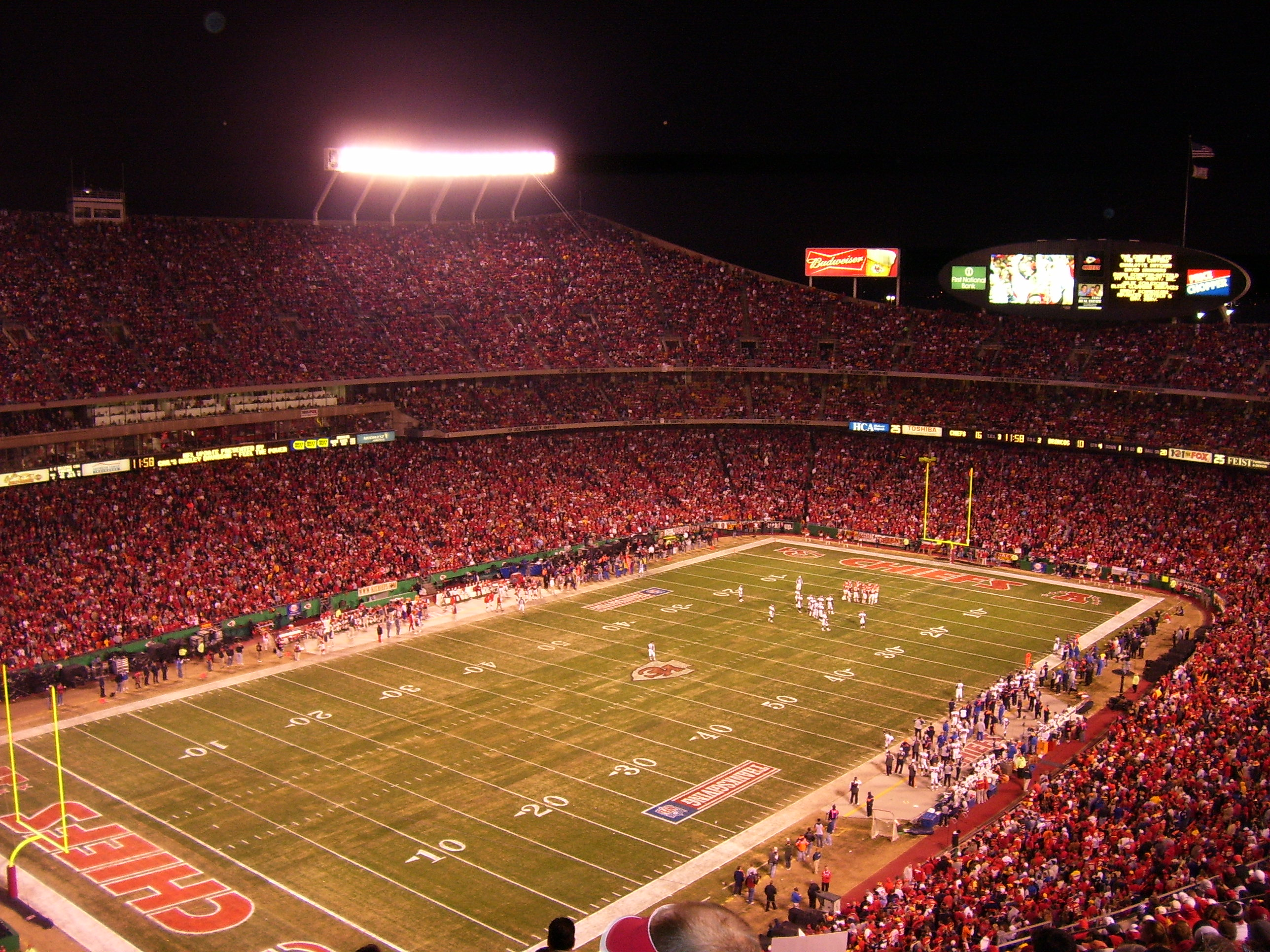
Arrowhead Stadium during the Chiefs-Broncos Thanksgiving night game in 2006

- Since 2006, three contests have been scheduled for Thanksgiving Day. In addition to the traditional Detroit and Dallas home afternoon games, a third game is now played in primetime and televised by NFL Network (2006–2011) or NBC (since 2012). The third game's start times have generally been the same as other primetime games, with pregame coverage beginning at 8:00 p.m. EST and kickoff at 8:20 p.m. EST. The primetime game is hosted by a different team (other than the Lions and Cowboys) each season.
- The Kansas City Chiefs hosted the Denver Broncos in the first "Thanksgiving Tripleheader" primetime game in 2006. This game also marked the first time that more than two games were played on Thanksgiving (as well as the first all-AFC holiday matchup) since the AFL–NFL merger in 1970. It was held at the request of Chiefs owner Lamar Hunt, who had asked the NFL to schedule a third Thanksgiving game for years. At the time of the game, Hunt was hospitalized in Dallas, Texas, and died weeks later at the age of 74.
- The 2014 season was the first in which CBS no longer had to air an inter-conference (AFC at NFC) Thanksgiving game. Instead, all three games featured NFC vs. NFC opponents for the first time. There were also all-NFC matchups in 2015, 2018 and 2023. 2017, 2019 and 2024 each featured five NFC teams and only one participating AFC team.
- From 2012 to 2015, and 2017 to 2019, the primetime game was held between division rivals. The originally scheduled 2020 primetime divisional rivalry game between the Baltimore Ravens and the Pittsburgh Steelers was postponed to Sunday, November 29 and eventually again to Wednesday, December 2 after multiple Ravens players and staff tested positive for COVID-19 in the days before the game. This marked the first time no Thanksgiving Day prime time contest was held since 2005.
- In 2012, the kickoff time for the Dallas "late" game was moved from 4:15 p.m. EST to 4:30 p.m. EST, with the networks also moving their pregame coverage for that game to 4:00 p.m. EST. This shift provided further protection from possible game overlap with the Detroit "early" game, and provided additional time to accommodate the special halftime performances.
- In 2025, the kickoff time for the Detroit "early" game moved from 12:30 p.m. EST to 1 p.m. EST.
- Two additional games have been added surrounding the Thanksgiving holiday. Since 2023, a Black Friday game has been held on the day after Thanksgiving (Prime Video). Beginning in 2026, a Thanksgiving Eve game will be held on Wednesday night, the day before Thanksgiving (Netflix).

Season	Date	Visiting team		Home team		TV	Game notes
2006	November 23	Miami Dolphins	27	Detroit Lions	10	CBS	
2006	November 23	Tampa Bay Buccaneers	10	Dallas Cowboys	38	Fox	
2006	November 23	Denver Broncos	10	Kansas City Chiefs	19	NFLN	First primetime Thanksgiving game; rivalry
2007	November 22	Green Bay Packers	37	Detroit Lions	26	Fox	Rivalry
2007	November 22	New York Jets	3	Dallas Cowboys	34	CBS	
2007	November 22	Indianapolis Colts	31	Atlanta Falcons	13	NFLN	
2008	November 27	Tennessee Titans	47	Detroit Lions	10	CBS	
2008	November 27	Seattle Seahawks	9	Dallas Cowboys	34	Fox	
2008	November 27	Arizona Cardinals	20	Philadelphia Eagles	48	NFLN	
2009	November 26	Green Bay Packers	34	Detroit Lions	12	Fox	Rivalry
2009	November 26	Oakland Raiders	7	Dallas Cowboys	24	CBS	
2009	November 26	New York Giants	6	Denver Broncos	26	NFLN	
2010	November 25	New England Patriots	45	Detroit Lions	24	CBS	
2010	November 25	New Orleans Saints	30	Dallas Cowboys	27	Fox	
2010	November 25	Cincinnati Bengals	10	New York Jets	26	NFLN	Wild-card rematch
2011	November 24	Green Bay Packers	27	Detroit Lions	15	Fox	Rivalry
2011	November 24	Miami Dolphins	19	Dallas Cowboys	20	CBS	
2011	November 24	San Francisco 49ers	6	Baltimore Ravens	16	NFLN	
2012	November 22	Houston Texans	34^{OT}	Detroit Lions	31	CBS	
2012	November 22	Washington Redskins	38	Dallas Cowboys	31	Fox	Rivalry
2012	November 22	New England Patriots	49	New York Jets	19	NBC	Rivalry (Butt Fumble)
2013	November 28	Green Bay Packers	10	Detroit Lions	40	Fox	Rivalry
2013	November 28	Oakland Raiders	24	Dallas Cowboys	31	CBS	
2013	November 28	Pittsburgh Steelers	20	Baltimore Ravens	22	NBC	Rivalry
2014	November 27	Chicago Bears	17	Detroit Lions	34	CBS	Rivalry
2014	November 27	Philadelphia Eagles	33	Dallas Cowboys	10	Fox	Rivalry
2014	November 27	Seattle Seahawks	19	San Francisco 49ers	3	NBC	NFC Championship rematch; rivalry
2015	November 26	Philadelphia Eagles	14	Detroit Lions	45	Fox	
2015	November 26	Carolina Panthers	33	Dallas Cowboys	14	CBS	
2015	November 26	Chicago Bears	17	Green Bay Packers	13	NBC	Rivalry
2016	November 24	Minnesota Vikings	13	Detroit Lions	16	CBS	Rivalry
2016	November 24	Washington Redskins	26	Dallas Cowboys	31	Fox	Rivalry
2016	November 24	Pittsburgh Steelers	28	Indianapolis Colts	7	NBC	
2017	November 23	Minnesota Vikings	30	Detroit Lions	23	Fox	Rivalry
2017	November 23	Los Angeles Chargers	28	Dallas Cowboys	6	CBS	
2017	November 23	New York Giants	10	Washington Redskins	20	NBC	Rivalry
2018	November 22	Chicago Bears	23	Detroit Lions	16	CBS	Rivalry
2018	November 22	Washington Redskins	23	Dallas Cowboys	31	Fox	Rivalry
2018	November 22	Atlanta Falcons	17	New Orleans Saints	31	NBC	Rivalry
2019	November 28	Chicago Bears	24	Detroit Lions	20	Fox	Rivalry
2019	November 28	Buffalo Bills	26	Dallas Cowboys	15	CBS	
2019	November 28	New Orleans Saints	26	Atlanta Falcons	18	NBC	Rivalry
2020	November 26	Houston Texans	41	Detroit Lions	25	CBS	
2020	November 26	Washington Football Team	41	Dallas Cowboys	16	Fox	Rivalry
2020	November 26	Baltimore Ravens	—	Pittsburgh Steelers	—	NBC	Rivalry (Note: The Ravens–Steelers game was postponed until the following Wednesday due to a COVID-19 outbreak within the Ravens organization.)
2021	November 25	Chicago Bears	16	Detroit Lions	14	Fox	Rivalry
2021	November 25	Las Vegas Raiders	36^{OT}	Dallas Cowboys	33	CBS	
2021	November 25	Buffalo Bills	31	New Orleans Saints	6	NBC	
2022	November 24	Buffalo Bills	28	Detroit Lions	25	CBS	
2022	November 24	New York Giants	20	Dallas Cowboys	28	Fox	Rivalry
2022	November 24	New England Patriots	26	Minnesota Vikings	33	NBC	
2023	November 23	Green Bay Packers	29	Detroit Lions	22	Fox	Rivalry
2023	November 23	Washington Commanders	10	Dallas Cowboys	45	CBS	Rivalry
2023	November 23	San Francisco 49ers	31	Seattle Seahawks	13	NBC	Rivalry
2024	November 28	Chicago Bears	20	Detroit Lions	23	CBS	Rivalry
2024	November 28	New York Giants	20	Dallas Cowboys	27	Fox	Rivalry
2024	November 28	Miami Dolphins	17	Green Bay Packers	30	NBC	
2025	November 27	Green Bay Packers	31	Detroit Lions	24	Fox	Rivalry
2025	November 27	Kansas City Chiefs	28	Dallas Cowboys	31	CBS	Preston Road Trophy
2025	November 27	Cincinnati Bengals	32	Baltimore Ravens	14	NBC	Rivalry
2026	November 26	Chicago Bears		Detroit Lions		CBS	Rivalry
2026	November 26	Philadelphia Eagles		Dallas Cowboys		Fox	Rivalry
2026	November 26	Kansas City Chiefs		Buffalo Bills		NBC	Rivalry

== All-time standings ==
=== Active franchises ===
Team	GP	W	L	T	PCT	Most recent
Chicago / St. Louis / Arizona Cardinals	23	6	15	2	.304	2008
Atlanta Falcons	4	1	3	0	.250	2019
Baltimore Ravens	3	2	1	0	.667	2025
Buffalo Bills	11	6	4	1	.591	2022
Carolina Panthers	1	1	0	0	1.000	2015
Decatur Staleys / Chicago Staleys / Chicago Bears	38	20	16	2	.553	2024
Cincinnati Bengals	2	1	1	0	.500	2025
Cleveland Browns	6	3	3	0	.500	1989
Dallas Cowboys	58	35	22	1	.612	2025
Denver Broncos	11	4	7	0	.364	2009
Portsmouth Spartans / Detroit Lions	86	38	46	2	.453	2025
Green Bay Packers	38	17	20	2	.462	2025
Houston Texans	2	2	0	0	1.000	2020
Baltimore / Indianapolis Colts	4	2	1	1	.625	2016
Jacksonville Jaguars	0	0	0	0	–	Never
Dallas Texans / Kansas City Chiefs	11	5	6	0	.455	2025
Oakland / Los Angeles / Las Vegas Raiders	8	4	4	0	.500	2021
San Diego / Los Angeles Chargers	5	3	1	1	.700	2017
Cleveland / St. Louis / Los Angeles Rams	5	4	1	0	.800	1975
Miami Dolphins	8	5	3	0	.625	2024
Minnesota Vikings	9	7	2	0	.778	2022
New England Patriots	6	3	3	0	.500	2022
New Orleans Saints	4	3	1	0	.750	2021
New York Giants	17	7	7	3	.500	2024
Titans of New York / New York Jets	8	4	4	0	.500	2012
Philadelphia Eagles	7	6	1	0	.857	2015
Pittsburgh Steelers	8	2	6	0	.250	2016
San Francisco 49ers	7	4	2	1	.643	2023
Seattle Seahawks	5	2	3	0	.400	2023
Tampa Bay Buccaneers	1	0	1	0	.000	2006
Houston Oilers / Tennessee Oilers / Titans	7	5	2	0	.714	2008
Washington Redskins / Commanders	13	4	9	0	.308	2023

=== Defunct franchises ===
Team	GP	W	L	T	PCT
Frankford Yellow Jackets	2	2	0	0	1.000
New York Yankees^{*}	2	2	0	0	1.000
Pottsville Maroons	2	2	0	0	1.000
Boston Yanks	1	1	0	0	1.000
Buffalo Bills^{*}	1	1	0	0	1.000
Dallas Texans	1	1	0	0	1.000
Los Angeles Buccaneers	1	1	0	0	1.000
Oorang Indians	1	1	0	0	1.000
Rock Island Independents	1	1	0	0	1.000
All-Tonawanda Lumberjacks	1	1	0	0	1.000
Akron Pros	5	3	1	1	.700
Buffalo All-Americans / Bisons	3	1	1	1	.500
Canton Bulldogs	3	1	1	1	.500
Cleveland Bulldogs	2	1	1	0	.500
Dayton Triangles	2	1	1	0	.500
Kansas City Blues / Cowboys	2	1	1	0	.500
Milwaukee Badgers	2	1	1	0	.500
Brooklyn Lions	1	0	1	0	.000
Chicago Tigers	1	0	1	0	.000
Detroit Heralds	1	0	1	0	.000
New York Yanks	1	0	1	0	.000
Providence Steam Roller	1	0	1	0	.000
Racine Legion	2	1	1	0	.500
Toledo Maroons	1	0	1	0	.000
Brooklyn Dodgers^{*}	2	0	2	0	.000
Chicago Rockets / Hornets^{*}	2	0	2	0	.000
Columbus Panhandles	2	0	2	0	.000
Detroit Panthers	2	0	2	0	.000
Hammond Pros	2	0	2	0	.000
Rochester Jeffersons	2	0	2	0	.000
Los Angeles Dons^{*}	3	0	3	0	.000

*All-America Football Conference (AAFC) team.

=== Most frequent matchups among active teams ===
Count	Matchup	Record	Years played
23	Lions vs. Packers	Lions, 12–10–1	1951, 1952, 1953, 1954, 1955, 1956, 1957, 1958, 1959, 1960, 1961, 1962, 1963, 1984, 1986, 2001, 2003, 2007, 2009, 2011, 2013, 2023, 2025
20	Bears vs. Lions	Bears, 11–9	1934, 1935, 1936, 1937, 1938, 1947, 1949, 1964, 1977, 1979, 1980, 1991, 1993, 1997, 1999, 2014, 2018, 2019, 2021, 2024
12	Battle of Chicago (Bears vs. Cardinals)	Bears, 7–3–2	1922, 1923, 1924, 1925, 1926, 1927, 1928, 1929, 1930, 1931, 1932, 1933
11	Cowboys vs. Washington	Cowboys, 9–2	1968, 1974, 1978, 1990, 1996, 2002, 2012, 2016, 2018, 2020, 2023
5	Lions vs. Vikings	Vikings, 3–2	1969, 1988, 1995, 2016, 2017
5	Cowboys vs. Dolphins	Dolphins, 3–2	1973, 1993, 1999, 2003, 2011
4	Cowboys vs. Cardinals	Cowboys, 4–0	1967, 1976, 1983, 1985
4	Lions vs. Chiefs	Tied, 2–2	1971, 1981, 1987, 1996

== Game MVPs ==
Since 1989, informal and sometimes lighthearted Most outstanding player/MVP awards have been issued by the networks broadcasting the respective games. Running back Emmitt Smith holds the record for most Thanksgiving MVPs with five (1990, 1992, 1994, 1996, 2002), followed by Tony Romo with four (2006, 2007, 2009, 2013). Among players not from Detroit or Dallas, Josh Allen, Drew Brees, Brett Favre, and Jordan Love each hold three. Voting on the respective awards is typically done informally by the announcing crew and/or producers, and criteria are loose. Noteworthy statistical accomplishments weigh heavily, and "group" awards are not uncommon. The announcement of the winner(s), and the presentation of the award is normally done immediately following the game, during post-game network coverage.

=== Turkey Leg Award (CBS & Fox) ===
In 1989, John Madden of CBS awarded the first "Turkey Leg Award", for the game's most valuable player. Pursuant to its name, it was an actual cooked turkey leg, and players typically took a celebratory bite out of the leg for the cameras during post-game interviews. Reggie White of the Eagles was the first recipient. The gesture was seen mostly as an amusing gimmick tied to the holiday and relating to Madden's famous multi-legged turkeys and turduckens. Since then, however, the award has gained notoriety. Madden brought the award to Fox in 1994, and it continued through 2001.

Due to the loose and informal nature of the award, at times it has been awarded to multiple players. On one occasion (1994), it was given to players from both teams.

=== Later Fox awards ===
When John Madden left Fox after 2001, Fox introduced a new award starting in 2002, named the Galloping Gobbler. It was represented by a small silver figurine of a cartoonish turkey wearing a football helmet striking a Heisman-like pose. Much like Cleatus and Digger, the original Galloping Gobbler trophy reflected Fox's irreverent mascots, and went through several iterations. Unimpressed by its tackiness, Emmitt Smith famously threw the 2002 award into a trash can.

In 2007, the kitschy statuette was replaced with a bronze-colored statue of an undistinguished turkey holding a football. In 2011, the trophies were discarded altogether and replaced by a commemorative plaque. Unlike the aforementioned "Turkey Leg Award", the Galloping Gobbler was normally awarded to only one player annually, however in 2016, co-winners were honored.

For 2017, the Galloping Gobbler was permanently retired, and replaced with the "Game Ball", a stylish, ornate football-shaped trophy, reminiscent of the tradition where game-used balls are generally awarded to players of the game. For 2019 and 2020 (coinciding with Fox's new partnership with WWE SmackDown), the "Game Ball" was replaced by a WWE Championship Belt. The "Game Ball" returned in 2021.

=== All-Iron Award (CBS) ===
When the NFL returned to CBS in 1998, they introduced their own award, the "All-Iron Award", which is, suitably enough, a small silver iron, a reference to Phil Simms' All-Iron team for toughness. The All-Iron winner also received a skillet of blackberry cobbler made by Simms' mother.

Through 2006, the trophy was only awarded to one player annually. Occasionally, it was issued as a "group award". In 2008, Simms stated it was "too close to call" and named four players to the trophy; he then gave the award to several people every year until 2013, after which he reverted to a single MVP in 2014.

Simms was removed from the broadcast booth for the 2017 season in favor of Tony Romo, who did not carry on the tradition. Instead, the "Chevrolet Player of the Game" award was extended to CBS' Thanksgiving Day game. As in CBS' regular Sunday afternoon NFL coverage as well as Fox's regular NFL coverage, Chevrolet will donate money in the player's name to the United Way if the game is played in Detroit, or the Salvation Army if the Thanksgiving Day game is played in Dallas.

For the 2019 season, CBS revived the Turkey Leg Award, awarding it to Josh Allen.

=== Prime time games (NFLN & NBC) ===
During the years when NFL Network held the broadcast rights of the prime time game, from 2007 to 2011, they gave out the "Pudding Pie Award" for MVPs. The award was an actual pie. In 2009, NFL Network gave Brandon Marshall a pumpkin pie rather than the chocolate pudding pie of the previous two years.

NBC, which carried Thanksgiving afternoon games through 1997, did not issue an MVP award during that time. NBC began broadcasting the Thanksgiving prime time game in 2012, at which point the MVP award was added. From 2012 to 2015, the NBC award was referred to as the "Madden Thanksgiving Player-of-the-Game", honoring John Madden (who announced NBC games from 2006 to 2008). The award then became the "Sunday Night Football on Thanksgiving Night Player of the Game" in 2016. It is typically awarded to multiple players on the winning team. In the first few years, the award specifically went to players on both offense and defense, but in recent years, there have been no quotas for each phase. The winning players are presented with ceremonial game balls and, as a gesture to Madden, a cooked turkey leg. The 2021 award also featured a turkey leg statuette in addition to legs prepared and seasoned by local chef (and former NBC star) Emeril Lagasse.

=== Madden Player of the Game / Thanksgiving MVP (2022–present) ===
In 2022, the NFL rebranded the three Thanksgiving Day games as the John Madden Thanksgiving Celebration to honor, commemorate, and celebrate the legacy of the late John Madden, who had died in December 2021. Each of the three networks selected a "Madden Player of the Game", with the NFL Foundation donating $10,000 in each winner's name to a youth or high school football program of their choice. Turkey legs continue to be awarded to the players of the game in homage to Madden, except for 2023 when Green Bay Packers quarterback Jordan Love was informed that there was none available.

In 2024, the award was given a new moniker, the Madden Thanksgiving MVP. A new trophy was unveiled – one to be handed out at each of the three games – consisting of a granite pylon with gold-colored engraving. The trophy includes an undated quote from John Madden: "There's no place I'd rather be today on Thanksgiving than right here, right now, at a football game." (The quote is a paraphrase of a famous quote originated by Marv Levy: "Where else would you rather be, than right here, right now?")

=== Complete list by network ===
CBS Turkey Leg Award
Year	MVP (Team)
1989	Reggie White (Philadelphia)
1990	Troy Aikman (Dallas); Emmitt Smith (Dallas)
1991	Erik Kramer (Detroit); Jerry Ball (Detroit)
1992	Emmitt Smith (Dallas); Offensive line (Dallas)
1993	Richard Dent (Chicago)
CBS All-Iron Award
1998	Stephen Boyd (Detroit)
1999	Dexter Coakley (Dallas)
2000	Charlie Batch (Detroit)
2001	Mike Anderson (Denver)
2002	Troy Brown (New England)
2003	Jay Fiedler (Miami); Chris Chambers (Miami)
2004	Peyton Manning (Indianapolis); Offensive line (Indianapolis)
2005	Ron Dayne (Denver)
2006	Joey Harrington (Miami)
2007	Tony Romo (Dallas); Defense (Dallas)*
2008	Albert Haynesworth (Tennessee); Chris Johnson (Tennessee); Kevin Mawae (Tennessee); LenDale White (Tennessee)
2009	Miles Austin (Dallas); Tony Romo (Dallas); Jason Witten (Dallas)
2010	Tom Brady (New England)
2011	DeMarcus Ware (Dallas)
2012	Andre Johnson (Houston); Matt Schaub (Houston); J. J. Watt (Houston)
2013	Tony Romo (Dallas); DeMarco Murray (Dallas); Lance Dunbar (Dallas); Honorable mention: Matthew McGloin (Oakland)
2014	Calvin Johnson (Detroit)
2015	Luke Kuechly (Carolina); Jerricho Cotchery (Carolina); Kurt Coleman (Carolina); Cam Newton (Carolina)
2016	Matt Prater (Detroit); Darius Slay (Detroit); Matthew Stafford (Detroit)
2017	None (see below)*
2018	None (see below)*
CBS Turkey Leg Award
2019	Josh Allen (Buffalo)
2020	Deshaun Watson (Houston)*
2021	Derek Carr (Las Vegas)
CBS Madden Player of the Game
2022	Josh Allen (Buffalo); Stefon Diggs (Buffalo); Tyler Bass (Buffalo)
2023	Dak Prescott (Dallas); DaRon Bland (Dallas)
CBS Madden Thanksgiving MVP
2024	Jared Goff (Detroit)
2025	Dak Prescott (Dallas)
2026	

Fox Turkey Leg Award
Year	MVP (Team)
1994	Emmitt Smith (Dallas); Jason Garrett (Dallas); Brett Favre (Green Bay); Sterling Sharpe (Green Bay)
1995	Herman Moore (Detroit); Brett Perriman (Detroit); Johnnie Morton (Detroit)
1996	Emmitt Smith (Dallas)
1997	Luther Elliss (Detroit); Johnnie Morton (Detroit); Barry Sanders (Detroit)
1998	Randy Moss (Minnesota)
1999	Gus Frerotte (Detroit); Greg Hill (Detroit); Johnnie Morton (Detroit); Robert Porcher (Detroit)
2000	Robert Smith (Minnesota); Randy Moss (Minnesota); Daunte Culpepper (Minnesota); Cris Carter (Minnesota)
2001	Brett Favre (Green Bay); Ahman Green (Green Bay)
Fox Galloping Gobbler Award
2002	Emmitt Smith (Dallas)
2003	Dré Bly (Detroit)
2004	Julius Jones (Dallas)
2005	Michael Vick (Atlanta)
2006	Tony Romo (Dallas)
2007	Brett Favre (Green Bay)
2008	DeMarcus Ware (Dallas)
2009	Donald Driver (Green Bay)
2010	Drew Brees (New Orleans)
2011	Aaron Rodgers (Green Bay)
2012	Robert Griffin III (Washington)
2013	Reggie Bush (Detroit)
2014	LeSean McCoy (Philadelphia)
2015	Matthew Stafford (Detroit)
2016	Dak Prescott (Dallas); Ezekiel Elliott (Dallas)
Fox Game Ball
2017	Case Keenum (Minnesota)
2018	Amari Cooper (Dallas)
Fox WWE Championship Belt
2019	Mitchell Trubisky (Chicago)
2020	Alex Smith (Washington)
Fox Game Ball
2021	Andy Dalton (Chicago)
Fox Madden Player of the Game
2022	Dak Prescott (Dallas)
2023	Jordan Love (Green Bay)
Fox Madden Thanksgiving MVP
2024	Micah Parsons (Dallas)
2025	Jordan Love (Green Bay)
2026	

NFL Network Pudding Pie Award
Year	MVP (Team)
2006	None (see below)*
2007	Reggie Wayne (Indianapolis)
2008	Donovan McNabb (Philadelphia); Brian Westbrook (Philadelphia)
2009	Brandon Marshall (Denver)
2010	Brad Smith (New York Jets); Darrelle Revis (New York Jets)
2011	Terrell Suggs (Baltimore)
NBC Madden Thanksgiving Player of the Game
2012	Tom Brady (New England); Vince Wilfork (New England); Steve Gregory (New England)
2013	Jacoby Jones (Baltimore); Justin Tucker (Baltimore)
2014	Russell Wilson (Seattle); Richard Sherman (Seattle)
2015	Jay Cutler (Chicago); Tracy Porter (Chicago)
NBC SNF on Thanksgiving Player of the Game
2016	Le'Veon Bell (Pittsburgh); Ben Roethlisberger (Pittsburgh); Antonio Brown (Pittsburgh)
2017	Kirk Cousins (Washington); Jamison Crowder (Washington); Ryan Kerrigan (Washington)
2018	Drew Brees (New Orleans); Alvin Kamara (New Orleans); Cameron Jordan (New Orleans)
2019	Drew Brees (New Orleans); Taysom Hill (New Orleans); Cameron Jordan (New Orleans)
2020	Not given (game postponed)*
2021	Josh Allen (Buffalo); Stefon Diggs (Buffalo); Dawson Knox (Buffalo)
NBC Madden Player of the Game
2022	Kirk Cousins (Minnesota); Justin Jefferson (Minnesota); Adam Thielen (Minnesota)
2023	Brock Purdy (San Francisco); Christian McCaffrey (San Francisco); Charvarius Ward (San Francisco)
NBC Madden Thanksgiving MVP
2024	Jordan Love (Green Bay)
2025	Joe Burrow (Cincinnati)
2026	

- 2006: No formal NFL Network award was given. Larry Johnson (Kansas City) was interviewed during post-game coverage.
- 2007: Of the members of the Dallas Cowboys defense, Chris Canty, DeMarcus Ware, Terence Newman and Greg Ellis were particularly noted.
- 2017: No formal CBS award was given. Philip Rivers and Keenan Allen (both of the Chargers) were interviewed during post-game coverage.
- 2018: No formal CBS award was given. Chase Daniel (Chicago) was interviewed during post-game coverage.
- 2020: The CBS award was sent to Deshaun Watson's home instead of being handed out after the game.
- 2020: No NBC prime time game was held due to a COVID-19 outbreak.

== Charity campaigns and halftime concerts ==
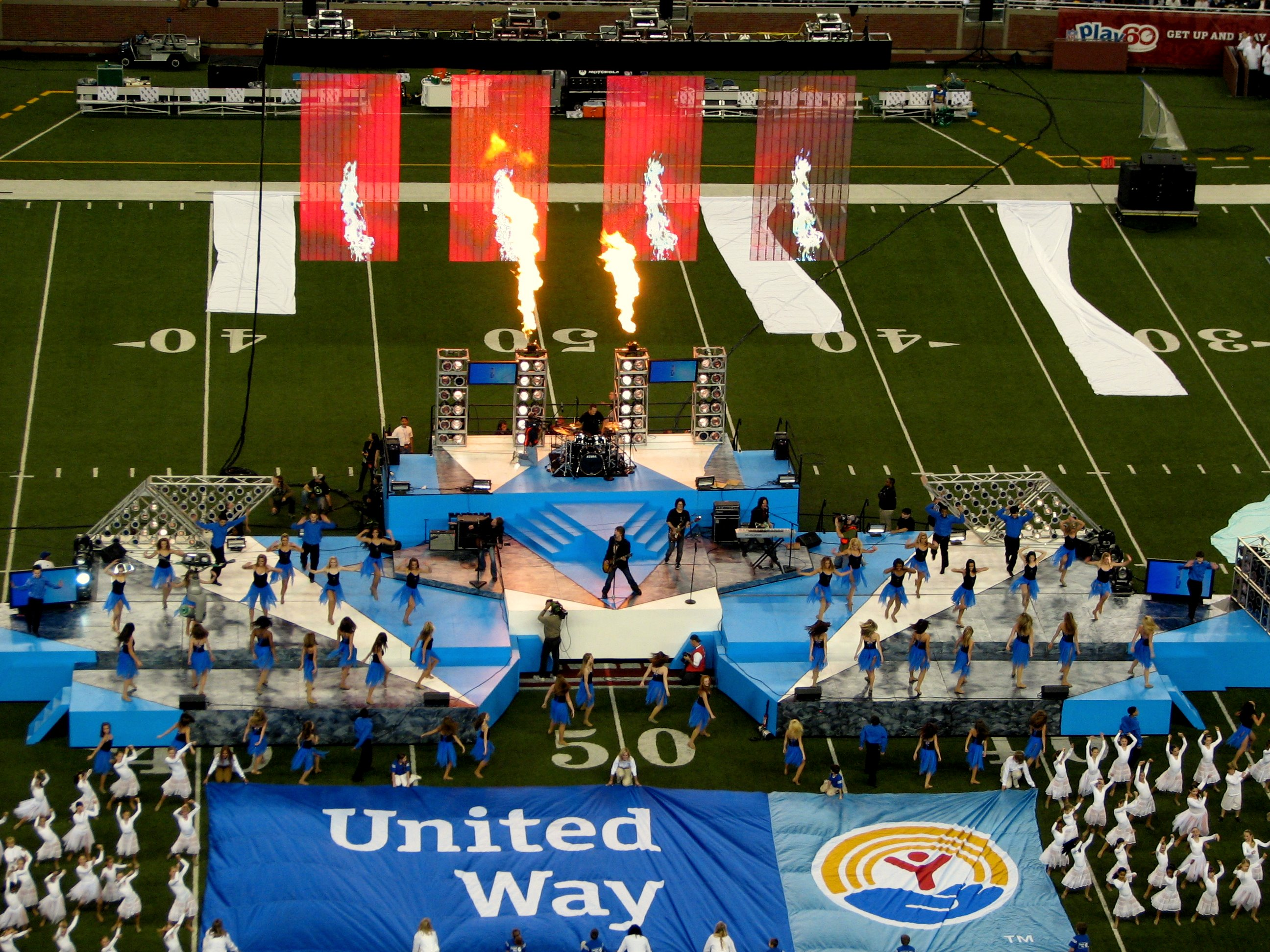
The 2007 Thanksgiving halftime show in Detroit, featuring the Goo Goo Dolls

In 1997, the Salvation Army began the tradition of kicking off its Christmas Kettle campaign during halftime of the Dallas game. The campaign kickoff event includes a halftime show by a major recording artist. One year later, a halftime concert was added to the Detroit game (which traditionally supports the United Way's Live United campaign). The evening contest also features a halftime concert, which the NFL promotes co-equally with the others, but this concert is usually not televised; its current broadcaster, NBC, uses that time slot to air its own pre-recorded human-interest profiles and typically only airs a few short highlights, whereas CBS and Fox air the Detroit and Dallas halftime shows in full. The NFL has treated the Thanksgiving halftime slots as a prime exposure opportunity second only to the Super Bowl halftime show.

In 2020, due to COVID-19 protocols, no halftime performance was scheduled for the Detroit game. Additionally, the primetime game on NBC (Ravens–Steelers), which was postponed until the following Wednesday due to a COVID-19 outbreak within the Ravens organization, also had no special halftime concert planned.

Year	Detroit	Dallas	Primetime	Ref.
1997	—	Reba McEntire	No game	
1998	United Way volunteers	Randy Travis	No game	
1999	Third Eye Blind	Clint Black	No game	
2000	Boyz II Men	Jessica Simpson & Billy Gillman	No game	
2001	Enrique Iglesias & The Winans	Creed	No game	
2002	Bon Jovi & Vanessa Carlton	LeAnn Rimes	No game	
2003	Mary J. Blige	Toby Keith	No game	
2004	John Mellencamp & Babyface	Destiny's Child	No game	
2005	Mariah Carey	Sheryl Crow	No game	
2006	John Fogerty	Carrie Underwood	John Fogerty	
2007	Goo Goo Dolls	Kelly Clarkson	—	
2008	Jesse McCartney	Jonas Brothers	—	
2009	Motown Tribute	Daughtry	—	
2010	Kid Rock	Keith Urban	—	
2011	Nickelback	Enrique Iglesias & Pitbull	—	
2012	Kid Rock	Kenny Chesney	Lenny Kravitz	
2013	Tony Lucca	Selena Gomez	Marin Alsop	
2014	Detroit Academy Choir	Pitbull with Ne-Yo	—	
2015	Big Sean	Luke Bryan	Brett Favre ceremony	
2016	Andy Grammer	Eric Church	—	
2017	Jason Derulo	Thomas Rhett	—	
2018	Mike Posner	Meghan Trainor	—	
2019	Brothers Osborne	Ellie Goulding	—	
2020	—	Kane Brown	—	
2021	Big Sean	Luke Combs	Human Jukebox	
2022	Bebe Rexha & David Guetta	Jonas Brothers	Tribute to John Madden	
2023	Jack Harlow	Dolly Parton	Steve Aoki	
2024	Shaboozey	Lainey Wilson & Jelly Roll	Lindsey Stirling	
2025	Jack White & Eminem	Post Malone	Lil Jon	
2026	Wu-Tang Clan	Miranda Lambert	U2 (Wed.); Goo Goo Dolls (Thu.)	

== See also ==
- American football on Thanksgiving
- NFL on Christmas Day
