= 1929 New York Giants season =

NFL team 5th season

- Head coach: LeRoy Andrews
- Home stadium: Polo Grounds

Results
- Record: 13–1–1
- League place: 2nd NFL

The 1929 New York Giants season was the franchise's 5th season in the National Football League. The team finished with a 13–1–1 record, good for second place. Their +226-point differential is the best in the history of the New York Giants. They won by 15 points or more six times.

== Schedule ==
Game	Date	Opponent	Result	Record	Venue	Attendance	Recap	Sources
1	September 29	at Orange Tornadoes	T 0–0	0–0–1	KoC Stadium	9,000	Recap	
2	October 6	at Providence Steam Roller	W 7–0	1–0–1	Cycledrome	14,000	Recap	
3	October 13	Staten Island Stapletons	W 19–9	2–0–1	Polo Grounds	30,000	Recap	
4	October 20	Frankford Yellow Jackets	W 32–0	3–0–1	Polo Grounds	30,000	Recap	
5	October 27	Providence Steam Roller	W 19–0	4–0–1	Polo Grounds	25,000	Recap	
6	November 3	at Chicago Bears	W 26–14	5–0–1	Wrigley Field	26,000	Recap	
7	November 5	at Buffalo Bisons	W 45–6	6–0–1	Bison Stadium	"handful of fans"	Recap	
8	November 10	Orange Tornadoes	W 22–0	6–0–1	Polo Grounds	20,000	Recap	
9	November 17	Chicago Bears	W 34–0	7–0–1	Polo Grounds	15,000	Recap	
10	November 24	Green Bay Packers	L 6–20	8–1–1	Polo Grounds	25,000	Recap	
11	November 28	at Staten Island Stapletons	W 21–7	9–1–1	Thompson Stadium	12,000	Recap	
12	December 1	Chicago Cardinals	W 24–21	10–1–1	Polo Grounds	5,000	Recap	
13	December 7	at Frankford Yellow Jackets	W 12–0	11–1–1	Frankford Stadium	7,000	Recap	
14	December 8	Frankford Yellow Jackets	W 31–0	12–1–1	Polo Grounds	20,000	Recap	
15	December 15	at Chicago Bears	W 14–9	13–1–1	Wrigley Field	5,000	Recap	
Note: Thanksgiving: November 28.

== Standings ==
Giants fullback Mule Wilson throws a straightarm in November 10 action against Orange AC.

NFL standings
	W	L	T	PCT	PF	PA	STK
Green Bay Packers	12	0	1	1.000	198	22	W2
New York Giants	13	1	1	.929	312	86	W4
Frankford Yellow Jackets	10	4	5	.714	129	128	W1
Chicago Cardinals	6	6	1	.500	154	83	W1
Boston Bulldogs	4	4	0	.500	98	73	L1
Staten Island Stapletons	3	4	3	.429	89	65	L2
Providence Steam Roller	4	6	2	.400	107	117	L1
Orange Tornadoes	3	5	4	.375	35	80	L1
Chicago Bears	4	9	2	.308	119	227	L1
Buffalo Bisons	1	7	1	.125	48	142	W1
Minneapolis Red Jackets	1	9	0	.100	48	185	L7
Dayton Triangles	0	6	0	.000	7	136	L6

Note: Tie games were not officially counted in the standings until 1972.

== See also ==
- List of New York Giants seasons
