= 1929 NFL season =

American football season

Regular season
- Duration: September 22 – December 15, 1929
- Champions: Green Bay Packers

NFL teams

The 1929 NFL Season was the tenth regular season of the National Football League. The league increased back to 12 teams with the addition of the Staten Island Stapletons, Orange Tornadoes and Minneapolis Red Jackets and the re-entry of the Buffalo Bisons. The Pottsville Maroons became the Boston Bulldogs, the New York Yankees folded, and the Detroit Wolverines merged into the New York Giants, with the Giants the surviving partner.

On November 3, the Chicago Cardinals at Providence Steam Roller match became the first NFL game to be played at night under floodlights. Meanwhile, the Green Bay Packers were named the NFL champions for the first time in franchise history after finishing the season with the best record.

== Teams ==
The league increased back to 12 teams in 1929.

First season in NFL *	Rejoined the NFL **	Last active season ^	Only season in the NFL post-rejoin ѻ

Team	Head coach	Stadium(s)
Boston Bulldogs ^	Dick Rauch	Braves Field (3 games), Minersville Park (one game), Mitchell Field (one game)
Buffalo Bisons **ѻ	Al Jolley	Bison Stadium
Chicago Bears	George Halas	Wrigley Field
Chicago Cardinals	Dewey Scanlon	Comiskey Park
Dayton Triangles	Faye Abbott	Triangle Park
Frankford Yellow Jackets	Bull Behman	Frankford Stadium
Green Bay Packers	Curly Lambeau	City Stadium
Minneapolis Red Jackets **	Herb Joesting	Nicollet Park
New York Giants	LeRoy Andrews	Polo Grounds
Orange Tornadoes *	Jack Depler	Knights of Columbus Stadium
Providence Steam Roller	Jimmy Conzelman	Cycledrome
Staten Island Stapletons *	Doug Wycoff	Thompson Stadium

== Rule changes ==
The NFL added the Field Judge as the fourth game official.

== Championship race ==
Neither the Green Bay Packers nor the New York Giants lost a game during the first nine weeks of the season. When they met at New York's Polo Grounds on November 24, 1929, the Packers were 9–0–0 and Giants were 8–0–1. "Whether New York or Green Bay, Wis., will hoist the 1929 National Professional Football league pennant to the top of the flagstaff will probably be determined here Sunday when the New York Giants and the Green Bay Packers, both undefeated teams, meet," an Associated Press report noted, adding "Although both the Packers and the Giants play other games before the end of the season, past performances indicated that tomorrow's game will be the crucial contest for the league's standings."

Verne Lewellen's pass to Herdis McCrary, and Bo Molenda's extra point, gave Green Bay a 7–0 lead in the first quarter. A pass from Benny Friedman to Tony Plansky gave the Giants a chance to tie in the third quarter, but the point after was blocked, and New York trailed 7–6. Green Bay added two touchdowns in the last quarter to win the game, 20–6 to take a one-game lead. Neither team lost their remaining games; the Packers finished at 12–0–1, the Giants at 13–1–1, giving coach Curly Lambeau and the Packers their first league title.

The NFL introduced a scheduled championship game four years later, in 1933: a playoff game for the championship was played the previous season in 1932, but this counted in the final standings, and was also played indoors on a modified field.

== Standings ==
NFL standings
	W	L	T	PCT	PF	PA	STK
Green Bay Packers	12	0	1	1.000	198	22	W2
New York Giants	13	1	1	.929	312	86	W4
Frankford Yellow Jackets	10	4	5	.714	129	128	W1
Chicago Cardinals	6	6	1	.500	154	83	W1
Boston Bulldogs	4	4	0	.500	98	73	L1
Staten Island Stapletons	3	4	3	.429	89	65	L2
Providence Steam Roller	4	6	2	.400	107	117	L1
Orange Tornadoes	3	5	4	.375	35	80	L1
Chicago Bears	4	9	2	.308	119	227	L1
Buffalo Bisons	1	7	1	.125	48	142	W1
Minneapolis Red Jackets	1	9	0	.100	48	185	L7
Dayton Triangles	0	6	0	.000	7	136	L6

Note: Tie games were not officially counted in the standings until 1972.
