= 1929 Chicago Cardinals season =

American football team season

- Head coach: Dewey Scanlon
- Home stadium: Comiskey Park

Results
- Record: 6–6–1
- League place: 4th NFL

The 1929 Chicago Cardinals season was their tenth in the league. The team improved on their previous output of 1–5, winning six games and finishing fourth in the league.

The Cardinals-Steam Roller game was the first night game in NFL history, which the Cardinals won 16–0, on two touchdowns, an extra point and a field goal by Ernie Nevers. Nevers also scored 40 points, the most in a game by a player in NFL history, in a 40–6 victory against the Bears.

Nevers' six rushing touchdowns in that game is an NFL record as of 2021, which was tied by New Orleans Saints running back Alvin Kamara in a 2020 Christmas Day game.

== Schedule ==
Game	Date	Opponent	Result	Record	Venue	Attendance	Recap	Sources
1	September 29	at Buffalo Bisons	W 9–3	1–0	Bison Stadium	4,000	Recap	
2	October 6	at Green Bay Packers	L 2–9	1–1	City Stadium	6,000	Recap	
3	October 13	at Minneapolis Red Jackets	L 7–14	1–2	Nicollet Park	10,000	Recap	
4	October 20	at Chicago Bears	T 0–0	1–2–1	Wrigley Field	20,000	Recap	
5	October 27	Green Bay Packers	L 6–7	1–3–1	Comiskey Park	8,000	Recap	
6	November 2	at Frankford Yellow Jackets	L 0–8	1–4–1	Frankford Stadium	5,000	Recap	
7	November 6	at Providence Steam Roller	W 16–0	2–4–1	Kinsley Park	6,000	Recap	
8	November 10	Minneapolis Red Jackets	W 8–0	3–4–1	Comiskey Park	1,000	Recap	
9	November 17	Green Bay Packers	L 0–12	3–5–1	Comiskey Park	10,000	Recap	
10	November 24	Dayton Triangles	W 19–0	4–5–1	Comiskey Park	"a few hundred"	Recap	
11	November 28	Chicago Bears	W 40–6	5–5–1	Comiskey Park	8,000	Recap	
12	December 1	at New York Giants	L 21–24	5–6–1	Polo Grounds	5,000	Recap	
13	December 8	at Orange Tornadoes	W 26–0	6–6–1	KoC Stadium		Recap	
Note: Thanksgiving: November 28.

== Standings ==
NFL standings
	W	L	T	PCT	PF	PA	STK
Green Bay Packers	12	0	1	1.000	198	22	W2
New York Giants	13	1	1	.929	312	86	W4
Frankford Yellow Jackets	10	4	5	.714	129	128	W1
Chicago Cardinals	6	6	1	.500	154	83	W1
Boston Bulldogs	4	4	0	.500	98	73	L1
Staten Island Stapletons	3	4	3	.429	89	65	L2
Providence Steam Roller	4	6	2	.400	107	117	L1
Orange Tornadoes	3	5	4	.375	35	80	L1
Chicago Bears	4	9	2	.308	119	227	L1
Buffalo Bisons	1	7	1	.125	48	142	W1
Minneapolis Red Jackets	1	9	0	.100	48	185	L7
Dayton Triangles	0	6	0	.000	7	136	L6

Note: Tie games were not officially counted in the standings until 1972.
