= 1929 Providence Steam Roller season =

National Football League team season

- Head coach: Jimmy Conzelman

Results
- Record: 4–6–2
- League place: 8th in NFL

The 1929 Providence Steam Roller season was their fifth in the league. The team failed to improve on their previous season's output of 8–1–2, winning only four games. They finished eighth in the league. The Steam Roller played in the first night game in league history against the Cardinals, losing 16–0.

== Schedule ==
Game	Date	Opponent	Result	Record	Venue	Attendance	Recap	Sources
1	September 29	Dayton Triangles	W 41–0	1–0	Cycledrome	8,500	Recap	
2	October 6	New York Giants	L 0–7	1–1	Cycledrome	14,000	Recap	
3	October 13	Orange Tornadoes	W 7–0	2–1	Cycledrome	10,000	Recap	
4	October 20	Buffalo Bisons	T 7–7	2–1–1	Cycledrome	8,500	Recap	
5	October 27	at New York Giants	L 0–19	2–2–1	Polo Grounds	25,000	Recap	
6	November 5	at Staten Island Stapletons	T 7–7	2–2–2	Thompson Stadium	10,000	Recap	
7	November 6	Chicago Cardinals	L 0–16	2–3–2	Kinsley Park	6,500	Recap	
8	November 9	at Frankford Yellow Jackets	L 0–7	2–4–2	Frankford Stadium	6,000	Recap	
9	November 10	Frankford Yellow Jackets	L 6–7	2–5–2	Cycledrome		Recap	
10	November 17	Minneapolis Red Jackets	W 19–16	3–5–2	Cycledrome	8,500	Recap	
11	November 24	Boston Bulldogs	W 20–6	4–5–2	Cycledrome		Recap	
—	November 28	at Boston Bulldogs	* * * canceled * * *					
12	December 1	Green Bay Packers	L 0–25	4–6–2	Cycledrome	6,500	Recap	

== Standings ==
NFL standings
	W	L	T	PCT	PF	PA	STK
Green Bay Packers	12	0	1	1.000	198	22	W2
New York Giants	13	1	1	.929	312	86	W4
Frankford Yellow Jackets	10	4	5	.714	129	128	W1
Chicago Cardinals	6	6	1	.500	154	83	W1
Boston Bulldogs	4	4	0	.500	98	73	L1
Staten Island Stapletons	3	4	3	.429	89	65	L2
Providence Steam Roller	4	6	2	.400	107	117	L1
Orange Tornadoes	3	5	4	.375	35	80	L1
Chicago Bears	4	9	2	.308	119	227	L1
Buffalo Bisons	1	7	1	.125	48	142	W1
Minneapolis Red Jackets	1	9	0	.100	48	185	L7
Dayton Triangles	0	6	0	.000	7	136	L6

Note: Tie games were not officially counted in the standings until 1972.
