= 1929 Orange Tornadoes season =

National Football League team season

- Owner: Edwin Simandl
- Head coach: Jack Depler
- Home stadium: Knights of Columbus Stadium

Results
- Record: 3–5–4
- League place: 8th in NFL

The 1929 Orange Tornadoes season was their first in the league. The team went 3–5–4, finishing seventh in the league.

== Schedule ==
Game	Date	Opponent	Result	Record	Venue	Attendance	Recap	Sources
1	September 29	New York Giants	T 0–0	0–0–1	KoC Stadium		Recap	
2	October 6	Boston Bulldogs	W 7–0	1–0–1	KoC Stadium		Recap	
3	October 13	at Providence Steam Roller	L 0–7	1–1–1	Cycledrome		Recap	
4	October 19	at Frankford Yellow Jackets	T 6–6	1–1–2	Frankford Stadium		Recap	
5	October 20	at Boston Bulldogs	W 19–13	2–1–2	Braves Field		Recap	
6	October 29	at Boston Bulldogs	L 0–6	2–2–2	Mitchell Field		Recap	
7	November 3	at Staten Island Stapletons	T 0–0	2–2–3	Thompson Stadium		Recap	
8	November 10	at New York Giants	L 0–22	2–3–3	Polo Grounds		Recap	
9	November 17	Frankford Yellow Jackets	T 0–0	2–3–4	KoC Stadium		Recap	
—	Bye							
10	December 1	Staten Island Stapletons	W 3–0	3–3–4	KoC Stadium		Recap	
11	December 8	Chicago Cardinals	L 0–26	3–4–4	KoC Stadium		Recap	
12	December 14	at Frankford Yellow Jackets	L 0–10	3–5–4	Frankford Stadium		Recap	

== Standings ==
NFL standings
	W	L	T	PCT	PF	PA	STK
Green Bay Packers	12	0	1	1.000	198	22	W2
New York Giants	13	1	1	.929	312	86	W4
Frankford Yellow Jackets	10	4	5	.714	129	128	W1
Chicago Cardinals	6	6	1	.500	154	83	W1
Boston Bulldogs	4	4	0	.500	98	73	L1
Staten Island Stapletons	3	4	3	.429	89	65	L2
Providence Steam Roller	4	6	2	.400	107	117	L1
Orange Tornadoes	3	5	4	.375	35	80	L1
Chicago Bears	4	9	2	.308	119	227	L1
Buffalo Bisons	1	7	1	.125	48	142	W1
Minneapolis Red Jackets	1	9	0	.100	48	185	L7
Dayton Triangles	0	6	0	.000	7	136	L6

Note: Tie games were not officially counted in the standings until 1972.
