= 1929 Frankford Yellow Jackets season =

National Football League team season

- Head coach: Bull Behman
- Home stadium: Frankford Stadium

Results
- Record: 10–4–5 NFL (13–4–5 Overall)
- League place: 3rd NFL

The 1929 Frankford Yellow Jackets season was their sixth in the National Football League. The team finished with a record of 10 wins and 4 losses, accumulating 5 ties in NFL action, good for third place in the league.

== Schedule ==
| Game | Date | Opponent | Result | Record | Venue | Attendance | Recap | Sources |
|---|---|---|---|---|---|---|---|---|
| – | September 22 | at Atlantic City Blue Tornadoes | W 6–0 | — | Bader Field | 5,000 | — | |
| 1 | September 28 | Dayton Triangles | W 14–7 | 1–0 | Frankford Stadium | 7,000 | Recap | |
| 2 | October 5 | Buffalo Bisons | W 19–0 | 2–0 | Frankford Stadium | 6,000 | Recap | |
| 3 | October 6 | at Buffalo Bisons | W 13–0 | 3–0 | Bison Stadium | "poor" | Recap | |
| 4 | October 13 | at Green Bay Packers | L 2–14 | 3–1 | City Stadium | 9,000 | Recap | |
| 5 | October 19 | Orange Tornadoes | T 6–6 | 3-1–1 | Frankford Stadium | 6,000 | Recap | |
| 6 | October 20 | at New York Giants | L 0–32 | 3–2–1 | Polo Grounds | 30,000 | Recap | |
| 7 | October 26 | Staten Island Stapletons | T 6–6 | 3–2-2 | Frankford Stadium | 7,000 | Recap | |
| 8 | October 27 | at Staten Island Stapletons | W 3–0 | 4–2–2 | Thompson Stadium | 10,000 | Recap | |
| 9 | November 2 | Chicago Cardinals | W 8–0 | 5–2–2 | Frankford Stadium | 5,000 | Recap | |
| 10 | November 9 | Providence Steam Roller | W 7–0 | 6–2–2 | Frankford Stadium | 6,000 | Recap | |
| 11 | November 10 | at Providence Steam Roller | W 7–6 | 7–2–2 | Cycledrome | | Recap | |
| 12 | November 16 | Chicago Bears | W 20–14 | 8–2–2 | Frankford Stadium | 9,000 | Recap | |
| 13 | November 17 | at Orange Tornadoes | T 0–0 | 8–2–3 | KoC Stadium | 1,500 | Recap | |
| 14 | November 23 | Minneapolis Red Jackets | W 24–0 | 9–2–3 | Frankford Stadium | 5,000 | Recap | |
| – | November 24 | at Clifton Heights Orange & Black | W 17–0 | — | Kent Field | 5,000+ | — | |
| 15 | November 28 | Green Bay Packers | T 0–0 | 9–2–4 | Frankford Stadium | 8,500 | Recap | |
| 16 | December 1 | at Chicago Bears | T 0–0 | 9–2–5 | Wrigley Field | 1,500 | Recap | |
| 17 | December 7 | New York Giants | L 0–12 | 9–3–5 | Frankford Stadium | 7,000 | Recap | |
| 18 | December 8 | at New York Giants | L 0–31 | 9–4–5 | Polo Grounds | 10,000 | Recap | |
| 19 | December 14 | Orange Tornadoes | W 10–0 | 10–4–5 | Frankford Stadium | | Recap | |
| – | December 15 | at Lebanon Battery H | W 26–0 | — | Pleasant Hill Gun Club Field | 2,000 | — | |
Note: Non-NFL opponents are in italics.

== Standings ==
NFL standings
| | W | L | T | PCT | PF | PA | STK |
|---|---|---|---|---|---|---|---|
| Green Bay Packers | 12 | 0 | 1 | 1.000 | 198 | 22 | W2 |
| New York Giants | 13 | 1 | 1 | .929 | 312 | 86 | W4 |
| Frankford Yellow Jackets | 10 | 4 | 5 | .714 | 129 | 128 | W1 |
| Chicago Cardinals | 6 | 6 | 1 | .500 | 154 | 83 | W1 |
| Boston Bulldogs | 4 | 4 | 0 | .500 | 98 | 73 | L1 |
| Staten Island Stapletons | 3 | 4 | 3 | .429 | 89 | 65 | L2 |
| Providence Steam Roller | 4 | 6 | 2 | .400 | 107 | 117 | L1 |
| Orange Tornadoes | 3 | 5 | 4 | .375 | 35 | 80 | L1 |
| Chicago Bears | 4 | 9 | 2 | .308 | 119 | 227 | L1 |
| Buffalo Bisons | 1 | 7 | 1 | .125 | 48 | 142 | W1 |
| Minneapolis Red Jackets | 1 | 9 | 0 | .100 | 48 | 185 | L7 |
| Dayton Triangles | 0 | 6 | 0 | .000 | 7 | 136 | L6 |

Note: Tie games were not officially counted in the standings until 1972.
