= 1929 Boston Bulldogs season =

National Football League team season

- Owner: Dr. J.G. Striegel
- President: Ed Morris
- Head coach: Dick Rauch
- Home stadium: Braves Field, Minersville Park

Results
- Record: 4–4
- League place: 4th NFL

The 1929 Boston Bulldogs season was their fifth and final season in the league and their only season after changing their name from the Pottsville Maroons. The team improved on their previous output of 2–8, winning four games. They finished fourth in the league.

Although the new Boston iteration of the franchise based it operations at Braves Field, the Bulldogs did not change ownership, still owned by Dr. J.G. Striegel of Pottsville, Pennsylvania. The team consequently hosted two games during the last week of October in their familiar stomping grounds, defeating both the Buffalo Bison and the Orange [NJ] Tornadoes at Pottsville's Minersville Park.

== Schedule ==
Game	Date	Opponent	Result	Record	Venue	Attendance	Recap	Sources
1	October 6	at Orange Tornadoes	L 0–7	0–1	KoC Stadium	7,000	Recap	
2	October 13	Dayton Triangles	W 41–0	1–1	Braves Field	1,000	Recap	
3	October 20	Orange Tornadoes	L 13–19	1–2	Braves Field	6,000	Recap	
4	October 27	vs. Buffalo Bisons	W 14–6	2–2	Minersville Park (Pottsville, PA)	"a large crowd"	Recap	
5	October 29	vs. Orange Tornadoes	W 6–0	3–2	Minersville Park (Pottsville, PA)	2,000	Recap	
6	November 10	at Staten Island Stapletons	L 6–14	3–3	Thompson Stadium	7,500	Recap	
7	November 17	Buffalo Bisons	W 12–7	4–3	Braves Field	"largest of season"	Recap	
8	November 24	at Providence Steam Roller	L 6–20	4–4	Cycledrome		Recap	
—	November 28	Providence Steam Roller	canceled	—	—	—	—	

== Standings ==
NFL standings
	W	L	T	PCT	PF	PA	STK
Green Bay Packers	12	0	1	1.000	198	22	W2
New York Giants	13	1	1	.929	312	86	W4
Frankford Yellow Jackets	10	4	5	.714	129	128	W1
Chicago Cardinals	6	6	1	.500	154	83	W1
Boston Bulldogs	4	4	0	.500	98	73	L1
Staten Island Stapletons	3	4	3	.429	89	65	L2
Providence Steam Roller	4	6	2	.400	107	117	L1
Orange Tornadoes	3	5	4	.375	35	80	L1
Chicago Bears	4	9	2	.308	119	227	L1
Buffalo Bisons	1	7	1	.125	48	142	W1
Minneapolis Red Jackets	1	9	0	.100	48	185	L7
Dayton Triangles	0	6	0	.000	7	136	L6

Note: Tie games were not officially counted in the standings until 1972.
