= 1929 Staten Island Stapletons season =

National Football League team season

- Head coach: Doug Wycoff
- Home stadium: Thompson Stadium

Results
- Record: 3–4–3
- League place: 6th NFL

The 1929 Staten Island Stapletons season was their inaugural season in the league. The team finished 3–4–3 and finished sixth in the league.

== Schedule ==
Game	Date	Opponent	Result	Record	Venue	Attendance	Recap	Sources
1	October 6	Dayton Triangles	W 12–0	1–0	Thompson Stadium	6,000	Recap	
2	October 13	at New York Giants	L 9–19	1–1	Polo Grounds	30,000	Recap	
3	October 26	at Frankford Yellow Jackets	T 6–6	1–1–1	Frankford Stadium	7,000	Recap	
4	October 27	Frankford Yellow Jackets	L 0–3	1–2–1	Thompson Stadium	10,000	Recap	
5	November 3	Orange Tornadoes	T 0–0	1–2–2	Thompson Stadium	3,500	Recap	
6	November 5	Providence Steam Roller	T 7–7	1–2–3	Thompson Stadium	10,000	Recap	
7	November 10	Boston Bulldogs	W 14–6	2–2–3	Thompson Stadium	7,500	Recap	
8	November 24	Minneapolis Red Jackets	W 34–0	3–2–3	Thompson Stadium	2,000	Recap	
9	November 28	New York Giants	L 7–21	3–3–3	Thompson Stadium	12,000	Recap	
10	December 1	at Orange Tornadoes	L 0–3	3–4–3	KoC Stadium	8,000	Recap	

== Standings ==
NFL standings
	W	L	T	PCT	PF	PA	STK
Green Bay Packers	12	0	1	1.000	198	22	W2
New York Giants	13	1	1	.929	312	86	W4
Frankford Yellow Jackets	10	4	5	.714	129	128	W1
Chicago Cardinals	6	6	1	.500	154	83	W1
Boston Bulldogs	4	4	0	.500	98	73	L1
Staten Island Stapletons	3	4	3	.429	89	65	L2
Providence Steam Roller	4	6	2	.400	107	117	L1
Orange Tornadoes	3	5	4	.375	35	80	L1
Chicago Bears	4	9	2	.308	119	227	L1
Buffalo Bisons	1	7	1	.125	48	142	W1
Minneapolis Red Jackets	1	9	0	.100	48	185	L7
Dayton Triangles	0	6	0	.000	7	136	L6

Note: Tie games were not officially counted in the standings until 1972.
