= 1929 Dayton Triangles season =

National Football League team season

- Head coach: Faye Abbott

Results
- Record: 0–6
- League place: 12th NFL
- Playoffs: No playoffs until 1932

The 1929 Dayton Triangles season was their tenth and final season in the league. As a traveling team, they played all six games on the road, finishing last in the league.

The franchise was sold and relocated to Brooklyn after the season, having lost its final seventeen games over a span of three seasons. During this stretch, the team was outscored 301–22.

== History ==
The 1929 Triangles were coached by Faye Abbott, his second and final season of coaching. Abbott had previously played for the Triangles; between coaching and playing, he participated in 70 of the Triangles' 77 games as a franchise. The franchise was winless under Abbott's head coaching. With the franchise relocating, Abbott would be the Triangles' fourth and final head coach.

The Dayton Triangles were limited to only seven points throughout the entire 1929 season, making them the last team in NFL history to score under ten points in a season. Their lone touchdown and scoring play of the season was scored on a 30-yard fumble recovery by left guard Al Graham (followed by a Pat Duffy extra-point kick) against the Frankford Yellowjackets.

With the team's ceasing operations in Dayton, the NFL lost its longest-lasting traveling team (1920–1929), and league lacked another traveling team until the Dallas Texans in 1952.

== Schedule ==
Week	Date	Opponent	Result	Record	Venue	Attendance	Recap	Sources
1	September 22	at Green Bay Packers	L 0–9	0–1	City Stadium	5,000	Recap	
2	September 28	at Frankford Yellow Jackets	L 7–14	0–2	Frankford Stadium	7,000	Recap	
3	September 29	at Providence Steam Roller	L 0–41	0–3	Cycledrome	8,500	Recap	
4	October 6	at Staten Island Stapletons	L 0–12	0–4	Thompson Stadium	6,000	Recap	
5	October 13	at Boston Bulldogs	L 0–41	0–5	Braves Field	1,000	Recap	
—	Bye							
6	November 24	at Chicago Cardinals	L 0–19	0–6	Comiskey Park	"a few hundred"	Recap	

== Standings ==
NFL standings
	W	L	T	PCT	PF	PA	STK
Green Bay Packers	12	0	1	1.000	198	22	W2
New York Giants	13	1	1	.929	312	86	W4
Frankford Yellow Jackets	10	4	5	.714	129	128	W1
Chicago Cardinals	6	6	1	.500	154	83	W1
Boston Bulldogs	4	4	0	.500	98	73	L1
Staten Island Stapletons	3	4	3	.429	89	65	L2
Providence Steam Roller	4	6	2	.400	107	117	L1
Orange Tornadoes	3	5	4	.375	35	80	L1
Chicago Bears	4	9	2	.308	119	227	L1
Buffalo Bisons	1	7	1	.125	48	142	W1
Minneapolis Red Jackets	1	9	0	.100	48	185	L7
Dayton Triangles	0	6	0	.000	7	136	L6

Note: Tie games were not officially counted in the standings until 1972.
