= 1929 Chicago Bears season =

NFL team season

- Owner: George S. Halas, Dutch Sternaman
- Head coach: George Halas
- Home stadium: Wrigley Field

Results
- Record: 4–9–2
- League place: 9th NFL

The 1929 season was the Chicago Bears' 10th in the National Football League. The team was unable to improve on their 7–5–1 record from 1928 and finished with a 4–9–2 record during head coach George Halas's final season. The showing earned them a ninth-place finish in the team standings their worst record to date and first time the club finishing below .500. Chicago scored 119 points total during the season, but the defensive squad conceded 227, most in the league.

== History ==
The Bears' season started promising enough, with a 4–1–1 start. However, three of those wins were against the Minneapolis Red Jackets, a team that finished the season 1–9. The final 9 games represented the worst stretch in franchise history, as the Bears went 0–8–1 to finish the season. Few of the Bears losses were even close contests. They lost three times to Green Bay, all shutouts. They also lost three times to New York. Against the Chicago Cardinals, the Bears fought them to a 0–0 tie in the first meeting, but ran into an NFL record performance in the rematch.

Ernie Nevers, the former All-America from Stanford and owner-coach-player of the defunct Duluth Eskimos, had the game of a lifetime against Chicago on Thanksgiving Day, November 28. Nevers rushed for an NFL record 6 touchdowns and added 4 PATs for an NFL record 40 points; 6 TDs and 40 points are both still records and among the oldest standing records in NFL history (although Gale Sayers and Dub Jones tied Nevers with 6 touchdowns in a game, Nevers' 6 rushing touchdowns are still an unmatched record). The Bears were crushed 40–6, with Nevers scoring all the Cardinals' points.

The inability of Chicago to compete with the top teams in the NFL may have been the catalyst for Halas to step down as player-coach and focus on his owner duties (Halas would return to coach in a few years). Clearly, the Bears needed more talent at the "skill positions" as the Chicago backfield was mostly unchanged since the early 1920s. One bright spot was the emergence of End Luke Johnsos, who caught two touchdown passes late in the season. In addition, the legendary Red Grange rejoined the team and regained some of his earlier form.

== Schedule ==
Game	Date	Opponent	Result	Record	Venue	Attendance	Recap	Sources
1	September 22	at Minneapolis Red Jackets	W 19–6	1–0	Breese Stevens Field	6,000	Recap	
2	September 29	at Green Bay Packers	L 0–23	1–1	City Stadium	13,000	Recap	
3	October 6	at Minneapolis Red Jackets	W 7–6	2–1	Nicollet Park	6,000	Recap	
4	October 13	at Buffalo Bisons	W 16–0	3–1	Bison Stadium	5,200	Recap	
5	October 20	Chicago Cardinals	T 0–0	3–1–1	Wrigley Field	20,000	Recap	
6	October 27	Minneapolis Red Jackets	W 27–0	4–1–1	Wrigley Field	9,500	Recap	
7	November 3	New York Giants	L 14–26	4–2–1	Wrigley Field	26,000	Recap	
8	November 10	Green Bay Packers	L 0–14	4–3–1	Wrigley Field	13,000	Recap	
9	November 16	at Frankford Yellow Jackets	L 14–20	4–4–1	Frankford Stadium	9,000	Recap	
10	November 17	at New York Giants	L 0–34	4–5–1	Polo Grounds	15,000	Recap	
11	November 24	Buffalo Bisons	L 7–19	4–6–1	Wrigley Field	3,500	Recap	
12	November 28	at Chicago Cardinals	L 6–40	4–7–1	Comiskey Park	8,000	Recap	
13	December 1	Frankford Yellow Jackets	T 0–0	4–7–2	Wrigley Field	1,500	Recap	
14	December 8	Green Bay Packers	L 0–25	4–8–2	Wrigley Field	6,000	Recap	
15	December 15	New York Giants	L 9–14	4–9–2	Wrigley Field	5,000	Recap	
Note: Thanksgiving Day: November 28.

== Standings ==
Aided by the lead blocking of Red Grange and the body block of Bill Senn, Bears quarterback Joey Sternaman breaks around end in October 1929 action against the Buffalo Bisons.

NFL standings
	W	L	T	PCT	PF	PA	STK
Green Bay Packers	12	0	1	1.000	198	22	W2
New York Giants	13	1	1	.929	312	86	W4
Frankford Yellow Jackets	10	4	5	.714	129	128	W1
Chicago Cardinals	6	6	1	.500	154	83	W1
Boston Bulldogs	4	4	0	.500	98	73	L1
Staten Island Stapletons	3	4	3	.429	89	65	L2
Providence Steam Roller	4	6	2	.400	107	117	L1
Orange Tornadoes	3	5	4	.375	35	80	L1
Chicago Bears	4	9	2	.308	119	227	L1
Buffalo Bisons	1	7	1	.125	48	142	W1
Minneapolis Red Jackets	1	9	0	.100	48	185	L7
Dayton Triangles	0	6	0	.000	7	136	L6

Note: Tie games were not officially counted in the standings until 1972.

== Roster ==
1929 Chicago Bears final roster
Backs: 10 Shorty Elness RB/QB/CB/S; 77 Red Grange RB/CB; 9 Walt Holmer FB/LB; 2 Paddy Driscoll RB/QB/CB/S/K; 6 Bill Senn RB/CB; 4 Joey Sternaman QB/S/K; 5 Laurie Walquist RB/QB/CB/S; 8 Roy White FB/LB	Linemen: 20 Zuck Carlson G/DG; 19 Earl Evans G/T/DG/DT; 22 Joe Kopcha G/T/DG/DT; 18 Don Murry T/DT; 17 Packie Nelson T/DT; 26 Bert Pearson C/MG; 16 Bull Polisky G/DG; 12 Sod Ryan T/DT; 13 George Trafton C/MG	Ends/Receivers: 14 Cookie Cunningham; 15 Bill Fleckenstein G/DG; 25 Gardie Grange; 24 Luke Johnsos K; Rookies in italics

=== Future Hall of Fame players ===
- Paddy Driscoll, halfback
- Red Grange, fullback (did not play in 1928)
- George Halas, end
- Ed Healey, tackle
- Link Lyman, tackle
- George Trafton, center

=== Other leading players ===
- Luke Johnsos, end (rookie from Northwestern)
- Joe Kopcha, guard (rookie from Chattanooga)
- Bill Senn, halfback
- Joey Sternaman, quarterback
- Laurie Walquist, quarterback
- Packie Nelson, tackle
- Sod Ryan, tackle
