= 1929 Green Bay Packers season =

NFL team season

- Head coach: Curly Lambeau
- Home stadium: City Stadium

Results
- Record: 12–0–1
- League place: 1st NFL

The 1929 Green Bay Packers season was their 11th season overall and their ninth season in the National Football League. The team finished with an undefeated 12–0–1 record under player/coach Curly Lambeau, earning them a first-place finish and the Packers' first National Football League Championship. A victory celebration of 20,000 fans greeted them upon their return to Green Bay from their final game in Chicago. In an exhibition game after the season, on December 15, the Packers lost to the Memphis Tigers, who then claimed a pro football championship.

Before the start of the season, the Packers signed three future Hall of Famers: Johnny Blood, Cal Hubbard, and Mike Michalske, who along with Lambeau led the Packers to the top of the league. Green Bay's current throwback uniform is based on the ones worn in 1929 in respect of the season that the Packers won their first championship. There is a debate among sports historians on whether or not the 1929 season was a perfect season for the franchise.

Some historians consider the 1929 season a perfect season since the Packers did not lose a game, joining the 1948 Cleveland Browns and the 1972 Miami Dolphins as one of the few undefeated NFL teams. Others argue that it was that one November 28 game with the Frankford Yellow Jackets, in which both teams failed to score any points, ultimately preventing the Packers from an obtaining perfect season. Regardless of that historic debate, it can not be denied that it was a very successful year for the team.

== Schedule ==
Game	Date	Opponent	Result	Record	Venue	Attendance	Recap	Sources
1	September 22	Dayton Triangles	W 9–0	1–0	City Stadium	5,000	Recap	
2	September 29	Chicago Bears	W 23–0	2–0	City Stadium	13,000	Recap	
3	October 6	Chicago Cardinals	W 9–2	3–0	City Stadium	6,000	Recap	
4	October 13	Frankford Yellow Jackets	W 14–2	4–0	City Stadium	9,000	Recap	
5	October 20	Minneapolis Red Jackets	W 24–0	5–0	City Stadium	6,000	Recap	
6	October 27	at Chicago Cardinals	W 7–6	6–0	Comiskey Park	8,000	Recap	
7	November 3	at Minneapolis Red Jackets	W 16–6	7–0	Nicollet Park	3,000	Recap	
8	November 10	at Chicago Bears	W 14–0	8–0	Wrigley Field	13,000	Recap	
9	November 17	at Chicago Cardinals	W 12–0	9–0	Comiskey Park	10,000	Recap	
10	November 24	at New York Giants	W 20–6	10–0	Polo Grounds	25,000	Recap	
11	November 28	at Frankford Yellow Jackets	T 0–0	10–0–1	Frankford Stadium	8,500	Recap	
12	December 1	at Providence Steam Roller	W 25–0	11–0–1	Cycledrome	6,500	Recap	
13	December 8	at Chicago Bears	W 25–0	12–0–1	Wrigley Field	6,000	Recap	

== Standings ==
NFL standings
	W	L	T	PCT	PF	PA	STK
Green Bay Packers	12	0	1	1.000	198	22	W2
New York Giants	13	1	1	.929	312	86	W4
Frankford Yellow Jackets	10	4	5	.714	129	128	W1
Chicago Cardinals	6	6	1	.500	154	83	W1
Boston Bulldogs	4	4	0	.500	98	73	L1
Staten Island Stapletons	3	4	3	.429	89	65	L2
Providence Steam Roller	4	6	2	.400	107	117	L1
Orange Tornadoes	3	5	4	.375	35	80	L1
Chicago Bears	4	9	2	.308	119	227	L1
Buffalo Bisons	1	7	1	.125	48	142	W1
Minneapolis Red Jackets	1	9	0	.100	48	185	L7
Dayton Triangles	0	6	0	.000	7	136	L6

Note: Tie games were not officially counted in the standings until 1972.
