= Packie Nelson =

American football player (1907–1992)

No. 17
- Position: Offensive tackle

Personal information
- Born: February 18, 1907; Chicago, Illinois, U.S.
- Died: December 1, 1992 (aged 85); Gaithersburg, Maryland, U.S.
- Listed height: 5 ft 11 in (1.80 m)
- Listed weight: 205 lb (93 kg)

Career information
- College: Illinois

Career history
- Chicago Bears (1929)

Awards and highlights
- National champion (1927)

Career statistics
- Games played: 7
- Stats at Pro Football Reference

Evert Fritchof Nelson (February 18, 1907 – December 1, 1992) was an American football offensive tackle who played one season in the National Football League (NFL) for the Chicago Bears. He played seven games in his career, all in 1929.
