= 1929 Buffalo Bisons (NFL) season =

National Football League team season

1929 Buffalo Bisons season
- President: Frank J. Offermann
- Head coach: Al Jolley

Results
- Record: 1–7–1
- Division place: 10th NFL

The 1929 Buffalo Bisons season was the Buffalo Bisons ninth and final season in the National Football League (NFL). The team marginally improved on their previous output of 0–5, winning one game. They finished tenth in the league.

After suspending operations halfway through the 1927 season, the Buffalo Bisons, name intact, returned for what proved to be a farewell season, with Al Jolley (a former player for the Oorang Indians) taking over as head coach. Jolley's dubious trademark was his teams' lack of offensive production; the Bisons never scored more than 7 points in the entire season (they had been shut out thrice) until their final game, a 19–7 win over the Chicago Bears (ironically, the very team that had robbed them of a league title at the peak of the team's success in 1921). In their first seven games, the Bisons never led during regulation, holding this dubious feat until the 2012 Kansas City Chiefs broke the record at eight games during regulation. This was, however, still an improvement from their 1927 season, when the team failed to score any points in all but one of their games.

The still-struggling Bisons franchise was folded at the end of a 1–7–1 season. Though the league flirted with returning to Buffalo in the late 1930s and again in 1950, it did not do so until the AFL–NFL merger in 1970, which added the Buffalo Bills to the league.

Jolley went on to coach the Cincinnati Reds in 1933; true to form, Jolley's Reds set a record for fewest points scored per game in a season (3.8) in the modern era (which did not begin until 1932).

== Schedule ==
Game	Date	Opponent	Result	Record	Venue	Attendance	Recap	Sources
1	September 29	Chicago Cardinals	L 3–9	0–1	Bison Stadium	4,000	Recap	
2	October 5	at Frankford Yellow Jackets	L 0–19	0–2	Frankford Stadium	6,000	Recap	
3	October 6	Frankford Yellow Jackets	L 0–13	0–3	Bison Stadium	"poor"	Recap	
4	October 13	Chicago Bears	L 0–16	0–4	Bison Stadium	5,200	Recap	
5	October 20	at Providence Steam Roller	T 7–7	0–4–1	Cycledrome	8,500	Recap	
6	October 27	vs. Boston Bulldogs	L 6–14	0–5–1	Minersville Park (Pottsville, PA)	"a large crowd"	Recap	
7	November 5	New York Giants	L 6–45	0–6–1	Bison Stadium	"handful of fans"	Recap	
8	November 17	at Boston Bulldogs	L 7–12	0–7–1	Braves Field	"largest of season"	Recap	
9	November 24	at Chicago Bears	W 19–7	1–7–1	Wrigley Field	3,500	Recap	

== Standings ==
Bisons end Tillie Voss has no chance to make a stop of Bears quarterback Joey Sternaman when facing a cut-block by Bill Senn and the interference of fullback Red Grange, October 13.

NFL standings
	W	L	T	PCT	PF	PA	STK
Green Bay Packers	12	0	1	1.000	198	22	W2
New York Giants	13	1	1	.929	312	86	W4
Frankford Yellow Jackets	10	4	5	.714	129	128	W1
Chicago Cardinals	6	6	1	.500	154	83	W1
Boston Bulldogs	4	4	0	.500	98	73	L1
Staten Island Stapletons	3	4	3	.429	89	65	L2
Providence Steam Roller	4	6	2	.400	107	117	L1
Orange Tornadoes	3	5	4	.375	35	80	L1
Chicago Bears	4	9	2	.308	119	227	L1
Buffalo Bisons	1	7	1	.125	48	142	W1
Minneapolis Red Jackets	1	9	0	.100	48	185	L7
Dayton Triangles	0	6	0	.000	7	136	L6

Note: Tie games were not officially counted in the standings until 1972.
