= Herb Franta =

American football player (1905–1950)

No. 32, 55
- Position: Lineman

Personal information
- Born: March 10, 1903; New Ulm, Minnesota, U.S.
- Died: August 3, 1950 (aged 47); Arlington Heights, Illinois, U.S.
- Listed height: 6 ft 0 in (1.83 m)
- Listed weight: 220 lb (100 kg)

Career information
- High school: New Ulm (MN)
- College: St. Thomas (1923–1926)

Career history

Playing
- Minneapolis Red Jackets (1929–1930); Green Bay Packers (1930)

Coaching
- DeLaSalle High School (1927–?) Line coach

Awards and highlights
- NFL champion (1930)

Career statistics
- Games played: 18
- Games started: 14
- Stats at Pro Football Reference

Herbert Joseph Franta (March 10, 1905 – August 3, 1950) was an American football player who was a lineman for two seasons in the National Football League (NFL) for the Minneapolis Red Jackets and Green Bay Packers. He played college football at St. Thomas and was an NFL champion with the Packers in 1930.

== Early life and education ==
Franta was born on March 10, 1905, in New Ulm, Minnesota. He attended New Ulm High School, being one of only two of the school's alumni (with Al Arndt) to make it to the NFL. He began attending the University of St. Thomas in 1923, and saw immediate playing time. The Minneapolis Star called him a "star" player and the Star Tribune reported that he was "one of the strongest tackles in the state." Of Native American descent, Franta was nicknamed "Chief." A three-year starter, he was named to several all-state teams.

Franta was plagued by injuries during his time at St. Thomas, breaking a bone in his hand in November 1925, suffering internal injuries and tearing a leg ligament in October 1926, and breaking his hand in early November 1926. He still managed to return for the season finale of 1926 against Hamline, playing what would be his last collegiate game as he graduated in 1927.

Franta served as the line coach at DeLaSalle High School in 1927, after graduating from St. Thomas.

== Professional career ==
Franta joined the Minneapolis Red Jackets of the National Football League (NFL) in 1929, being assigned the number 32; he was the only player for the team to ever wear the number. At the time, he weighed 220 pounds and stood at between 6 ft 0 in and 6 ft 1 in. Franta was a full-time starter for the Red Jackets, starting all 10 games as they compiled an overall record of 1–9 against NFL opponents. In the team's game against the Chicago Cardinals, Franta directly opposed Pro Football Hall of Famer Duke Slater, and The Chicago Defender wrote afterwards "The Slater-Franta duel provoked great interest from the football writers and fans. Experts claimed that more inside football was shown on their side of the line than had ever been displayed before."

Franta returned to the Red Jackets in 1930. The Post-Crescent compared him to Mike Michalske and stated that he was one of Minneapolis' best forwards, noting that against the Green Bay Packers, he "probably got as many tackles as all the other [Minneapolis] forwards combined." After having played six games, three as a starter, for the Red Jackets, he was purchased along with Ken Haycraft and Oran Pape by head coach Curly Lambeau of the Packers. Franta played two games, one as a starter, with Green Bay before being suspended near the end of the season, reportedly due to Lambeau wanting veteran players for their final games which decided the NFL championship. The Packers ultimately won the league title. Franta did not continue playing in the NFL after the season, thus finishing his career with 18 games played, 14 of which he started. Although he never again played in the NFL, Franta later appeared in several exhibitions with the Minnesota All-Stars and a team composed of former St. Thomas players, including one game with the former against the Chicago Bears.

== Later life and death ==
Franta was married to Katherine K. Franta, with whom he had four children. In 1942, he was working for the Minnesota State Highway Department, although he also enlisted in the United States military the same year to serve during World War II. He died on August 3, 1950, at the age of 47, after a car crash. Franta had been driving a trailer with his two sons to move the family from St. Paul, Minnesota, to Des Plaines, Illinois, and fell asleep at the wheel before crashing into a tree. He broke his neck in the crash and died the next day.
