= Henry Willegale =

American football player (1901–1964)

Profile
- Position: Back

Personal information
- Born: June 9, 1901; Madison, Wisconsin
- Died: June 26, 1964 (aged 63); Minneapolis, Minnesota
- Listed height: 5 ft 11 in (1.80 m)
- Listed weight: 190 lb (86 kg)

Career information
- High school: Worthington (MN)
- College: Carleton

Career history
- Minneapolis Red Jackets (1929)
- Stats at Pro Football Reference

Henry Minard Willegale (June 9, 1901 – June 26, 1964) was a player in the National Football League for the Minneapolis Red Jackets in 1929. He played at the collegiate level at Carleton College.

== Biography ==
Willegale was born on June 9, 1901, in Madison, Wisconsin. He died in Minneapolis in 1964.
