= Faye Abbott =

American football player and coach (1895–1965)

Profile
- Positions: Fullback, tailback, wingback, quarterback, end

Personal information
- Born: August 16, 1895; Clearport, Ohio, U.S.
- Died: January 21, 1965 (aged 69); Dayton, Ohio, U.S.

Career information
- High school: Lancaster
- College: Kenyon; Syracuse

Career history

Playing
- 1921–1929: Dayton Triangles

Coaching
- 1928–1929: Dayton Triangles
- Coaching profile at Pro Football Reference

Lafayette "Faye" Abbott (August 16, 1895 – January 21, 1965), also known as "Hack" Abbott, was an American football player and head coach for the Dayton Triangles from 1921 to 1929.

Abbott was born in Clearport, Ohio. He played football as a student at Lancaster High School, Kenyon College before World War I, and Syracuse University after the war. During the war he also played football in Texas, as a member of the military team at Ellington Field.

Abbott made his debut in the APFA in 1921, and played in 57 games, all with the Dayton Triangles. He also served as their head coach in 1928 and 1929, finishing 0–7, 10th in the NFL, and 0–6, 12th in the NFL, respectively. He completed 12 out of 38 career passes for a total of 244 yards, zero touchdowns, and eight interceptions. He had five career interceptions, and three receptions for 34 yards and a touchdown, which came in 1921. He had 65 career punts for 1,996 yards, which is a 30.7 average.

== Head coaching record ==
=== NFL ===
Team	Year	Regular season					Postseason			
Team	Year	Won	Lost	Ties	Win %	Finish	Won	Lost	Win %	Result
DAY	1928	0	7	0	.000		–	–	–	–
DAY	1929	0	6	0	.000		–	–	–	–
DAY total		0	13	0	.000		–	–	–	–
Total		0	13	0	.000		–	–	–	–
