= Lee Wilson (American football) =

American football player (1905–1970)

Profile
- Positions: End, back

Personal information
- Born: July 24, 1905; DeWitt, Illinois
- Died: January 17, 1970 (aged 64); Clarion, Iowa
- Listed height: 5 ft 11 in (1.80 m)
- Listed weight: 184 lb (83 kg)

Career information
- College: Cornell College

Career history
- Minneapolis Red Jackets (1929-1930); Frankford Yellow Jackets (1930-1931)
- Stats at Pro Football Reference

Leland Moore Wilson (July 24, 1905 – January 17, 1970) was an American football player. He played college football for Cornell College and in the National Football League (NFL) as an end and back for the Minneapolis Red Jackets (1929-1930) and Frankford Yellow Jackets (1930-1931). He appeared in 26 NFL games, 18 as a starter.
