= Fritz Loven =

American football player (1894–1975)

Profile
- Position: Guard

Personal information
- Born: June 11, 1894; Minneapolis
- Died: November 1, 1975 (aged 81); Cass County, Minnesota
- Listed weight: 182 lb (83 kg)

Career history
- Minneapolis Red Jackets (1929)

Career statistics
- Games: 9

Fred Oscar "Fritz" Loven (June 11, 1894 – November 1, 1975) was an American football player. He played professional football for the Minneapolis Red Jackets in 1929 and thereafter lived for more than 40 years a life of "socialized exclusion" in a cabin in the woods.

== Early life ==
Loven was born in 1894 in Minneapolis, Minnesota.

== Professional football ==
In 1920, Loven played professional football at the tackle position for the Liberty football team in Minnesota. He also played in the National Football League (NFL) as a guard for the Minneapolis Red Jackets. He made his NFL debut at age 35 in 1929 and appeared in eight NFL games, five as a starter. Loven also completed athletically as a boxer and swimmer.

== Later years and legacy ==
Loven lived for more than 40 years, starting in 1932, in a cabin on 80 acres in Lake Shore, Minnesota. In a 1973 profile of Loven published in the North Country Anvil, his lifestyle was described as one of "socialized exclusion". He died in 1975 at Cass County, Minnesota. He left his property to the state which has since been operated as Fritz Loven Park.
