= Al Maeder =

American football player (1906–1984)

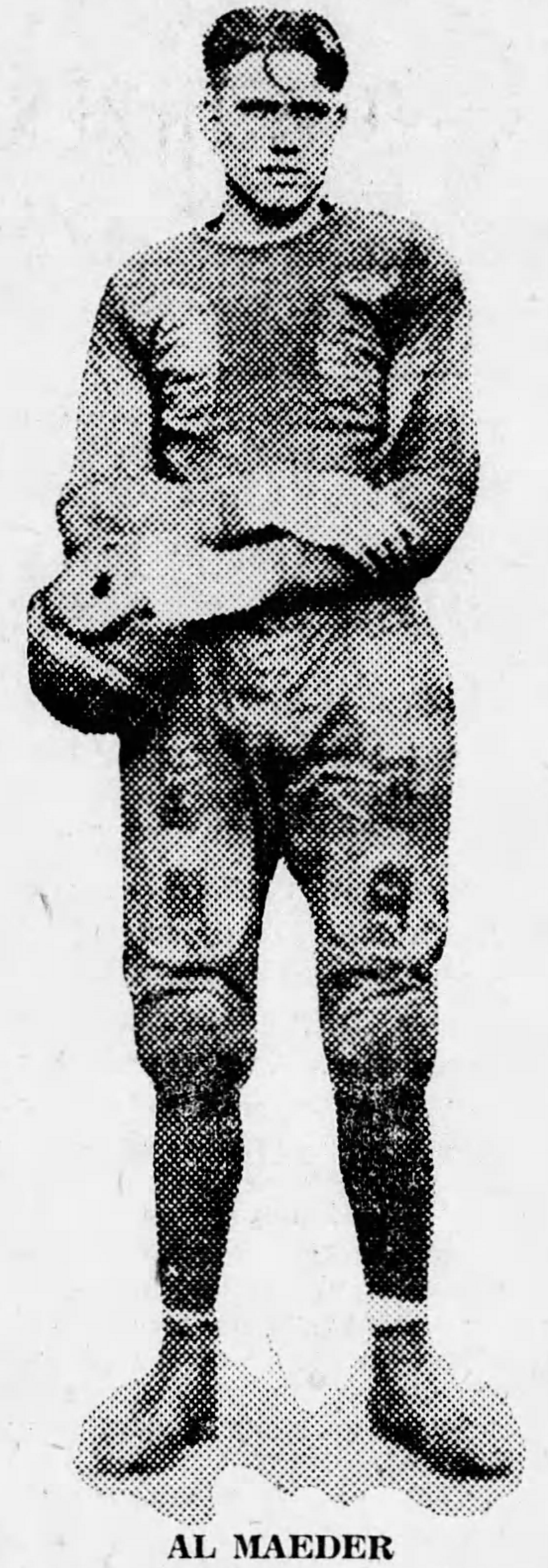
- Maeder, 1927

Profile
- Position: Tackle

Personal information
- Born: January 25, 1906; Minneapolis
- Died: August 25, 1984 (aged 78); Eden Prairie, Minnesota
- Listed height: 5 ft 9 in (1.75 m)
- Listed weight: 185 lb (84 kg)

Career information
- High school: Minneapolis East (MN)
- College: Minnesota

Career history
- Minneapolis Red Jackets (1926–1929)

Career statistics
- Games: 9

Albert Raymond Maeder (January 25, 1906 – August 25, 1984) was an American football player.

Maeder was born in Minneapolis in 1906. He attended East High School in that city. He played college football for the Minnesota Golden Gophers from 1925 to 1927. He was a member of Tau Kappa Epsilon fraternity and the Alpha Zeta honorary society.

He played professional football in the National Football League (NFL) as a tackle for the Minneapolis Red Jackets. He appeared in nine NFL games, two as a starter, during the 1929 season. After an October 6, 1929 game, The Minneapolis Morning Tribune called Maeder a star, noting that he "stood out on the line."

He married Teresa Lauglin in June 1928. They had a daughter, Clare Laughlin Maeder, born in August 1929. After his football career ended, Maeder worked for several years in the oil business and then operated a service station in Hopkins, Minnesota. He then worked as a Minnesota welfare caseworker and eventually as a welfare supervisor.
