= Frank Gause =

American football player (1905–1972)

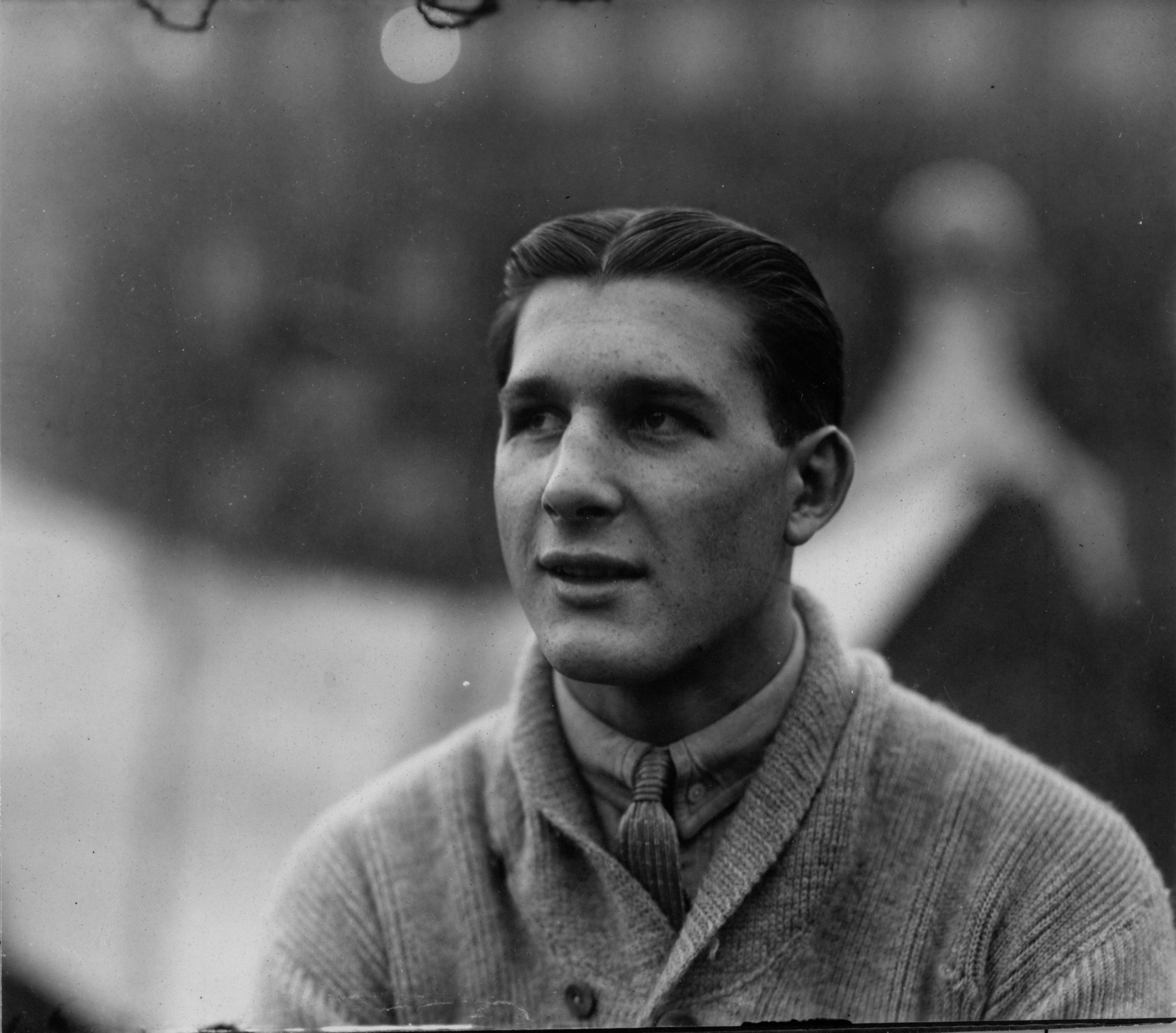

Profile
- Positions: Center, guard

Personal information
- Born: January 11, 1905; Minneapolis
- Died: February 1, 1976 (aged 71); Minneapolis
- Listed weight: 190 lb (86 kg)

Career information
- High school: North (MN)

Career history
- Minneapolis Red Jackets (1929)

Career statistics
- Games: 3

Frank Otto Gause (February 11, 1905 – August 15, 1972) was an American football player. Gause was born in 1905 in Minneapolis. He was a star football player at Minneapolis' North High School in the early 1920s. He played professional football in the National Football League (NFL) as a center and guard for the Minneapolis Red Jackets. He appeared in three NFL games, two as a starter, during the 1929 season. He also played for the Ace Box Lunch team in 1931. He died in 1976 in Minneapolis.
