= Knights of Columbus Stadium =

Knights of Columbus (football) Stadium in East Orange, New Jersey

- Location: East Orange, New Jersey

Tenants
- Orange Athletic Club (Ind.) (1926–1928); Orange Tornadoes (NFL) (1929); Orange Tornadoes (Ind.) (1931–1935); Orange Tornadoes (AA) (1936)

Knights of Columbus Stadium was a football stadium located in East Orange, New Jersey, along Main Street. The stadium was used by the Orange Tornadoes of the National Football League in 1929. However, the Tornadoes first moved into the stadium in 1926, when they were still called the Orange Athletic Club. The Tornadoes briefly moved to Newark, New Jersey in 1930. However, after a disastrous season, the team moved back to Orange and played independently at the stadium from 1931 until 1935. The team also played at Knights of Columbus Stadium in 1936, as a member of American Association.

The largest crowd in 1929 was 9,000 people who attended the season opener on September 29. The smallest crowd of the season was 1,500 people on November 17. Former Orange player, Ernest Cuneo, once wrote that the attendance mainly ran in the range between 2,500 and 3,000 fans at Knights of Columbus Field, which was low even for a Depression year.

Preceded by East Orange Stadium	Home of the Orange A.C.- Orange/Newark Tornadoes; 1926–1929	Succeeded by Newark Schools Stadium
Preceded by Newark Velodrome	Home of the Orange A.C.- Orange/Newark Tornadoes; 1931–1936	Succeeded by Newark Schools Stadium
