= Thompson Stadium (Staten Island) =

Football stadium in New York, US

- Interactive map of Thompson Stadium
- Location: Stapleton; Staten Island, New York; United States
- Coordinates: 40°37′14.5″N 74°04′50.5″W
- Capacity: NFL football: 8,000
- Surface: Grass

Construction
- Opened: c. 1920
- Demolished: 1958

Tenant
- Staten Island Stapletons (NFL) (1924–1933)

Thompson Stadium was a football stadium located on Staten Island and used by the Staten Island Stapletons of the National Football League from 1924 until 1933. It was located on the site of present Berta A. Dreyfus Intermediate School 49 and the Stapleton Houses.

The stadium was built in the early 1920s by the wealthy owner of the local Thompson's Lumber Company. It was built against a hill in Staten Island's Stapleton neighborhood and doubled in summer as a home for semi-pro baseball. Inside its stockade fence, about 8,000 uncovered bleacher seats encircled the field. The field's locker rooms consisted of sheds standing just outside the fence. Stapleton's owner, Dan Blaine, owned a restaurant which was located next door to the stadium, and after games and practices players and fans would meet up for beers.

While an average of 3,000 fans normally paid their way into each game, hundreds of others would usually watch the game for free from the hill behind the south end zone. Although far smaller than other NFL venues, like the Polo Grounds and Wrigley Field, Thompson's Stadium hosted four years of NFL football. The stadium was demolished in 1958, and the borough of Staten Island would be left without a professional ballpark until the Ballpark at St. George was completed in 2001.
