= Frankford Stadium =

Football field in Philadelphia, US

Coordinates: 40.0269°N 75.0638°W

- Yellow Jacket Field
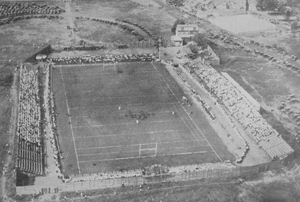
- Interactive map of Frankford Stadium
- Location: Frankford Ave. & Devereaux Ave. Philadelphia, Pennsylvania
- Owner: Frankford Athletic Association

Construction
- Opened: 1923
- Demolished: July 27, 1931 (fire)

Tenants
- Frankford Yellow Jackets (Ind.) (1923); Frankford Yellow Jackets (NFL) (1924-1930)

Frankford Stadium, also known as Yellow Jacket Field, was a football field in Philadelphia, Pennsylvania that was the home of the Frankford Yellow Jackets football team of the National Football League, which predated the Philadelphia Eagles.

The stadium, located at Frankford Avenue and Devereaux Avenue, was the Yellow Jackets' home from 1923 through 1930. On July 27, 1931, a fire caused major damage to the structure, forcing the Yellow Jackets to play their remaining home games at the Baker Bowl and Municipal Stadium, before disbanding during the 1931 season. The site was purchased in 1933 by the Franklin Legion Athletic Association, who demolished the structure to build the Franklin Legion Athletic Field. When the Frankford Legion AA reorganized as the Northeast Philadelphia AA later that year, the stadium's name was changed to Yellow Trojan Field.
