= List of NFL head coaches =

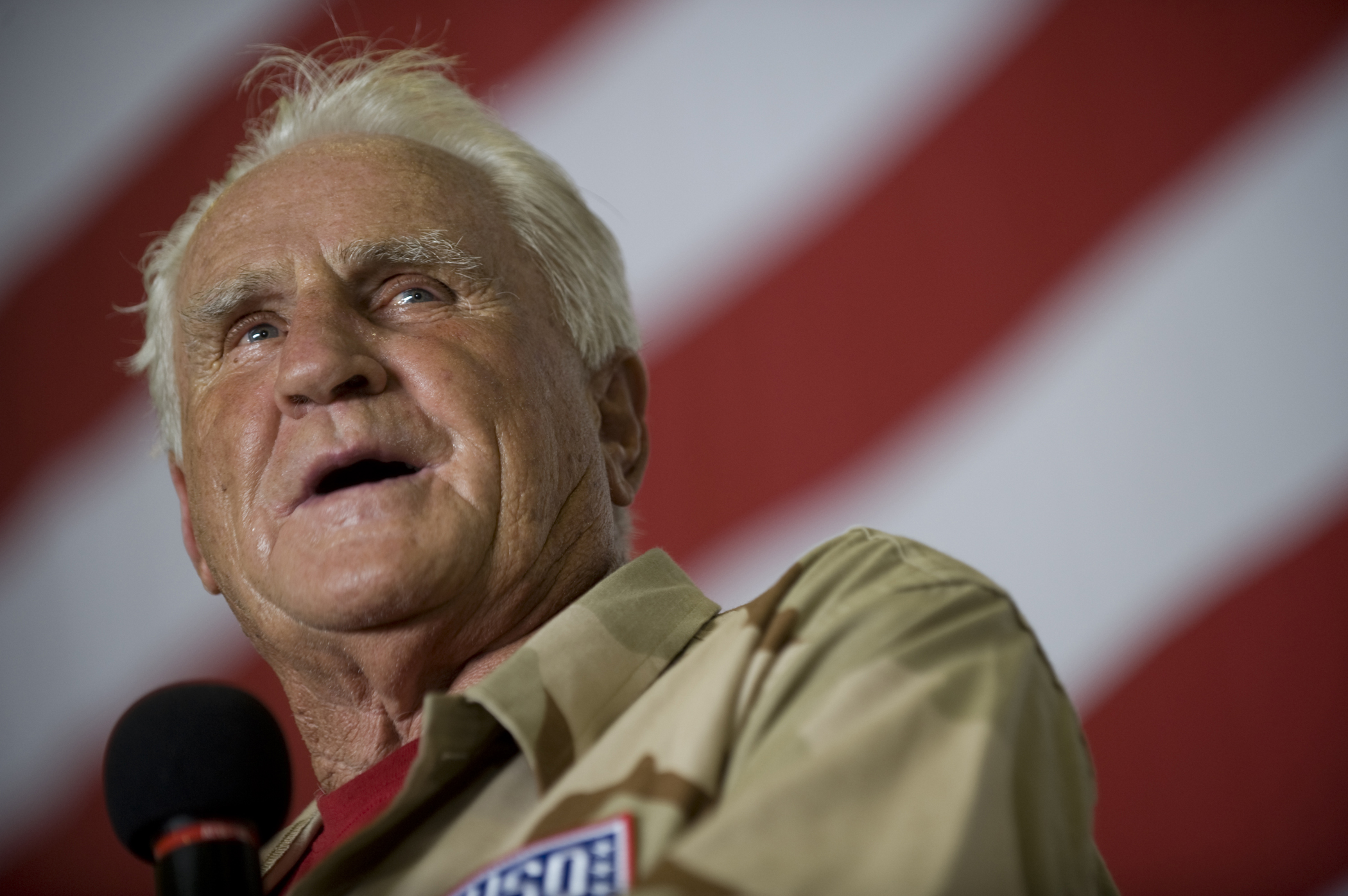
Don Shula has the most victories of any NFL head coach with 347.

The National Football League (NFL) is a professional American football league consisting of 32 teams, divided equally between the National Football Conference (NFC) and the American Football Conference (AFC). The NFL is one of the four major professional sports leagues in North America, and the highest professional level of American football in the world. The NFL was founded in 1920. In the course of its existence, it has merged with the All-America Football Conference (AAFC) and the American Football League (AFL) to create the current NFL. The AAFC merged with the NFL in 1950, and the AFL merged with the NFL in 1970. The history and records of the AFL were incorporated into the NFL.

In the 106-year history of the NFL, there have been 543 head coaches, 32 of whom are currently active as head coaches. George Halas has the longest tenure of any NFL head coach, with a career spanning 40 years, however, these seasons were not consecutive as they were spread out over 4 separate tenures. Don Shula, who had a 33-year coaching career spanning from 1963 to 1995, has coached the most overall games with 526 (490 regular season games and 36 postseason games). Former Green Bay Packers coach Curly Lambeau and former Dallas Cowboys coach Tom Landry share the record for most consecutive seasons coaching one team with 29.

== Key ==
#	Number of coaches
Yrs	Number of years coached
First	First season coached
Last	Last season coached
G	Games coached
W	Wins
L	Loses
T	Ties
W%	Winning percentage
CH	Times coach won the Super Bowl or before the league championship game
SB	Times team won the Super Bowl
CC	Times team won the conference championship, since the start of the Super Bowl
†	Elected into the Pro Football Hall of Fame as a coach
‡	Elected into the Pro Football Hall of Fame as a player
^	Elected into the Pro Football Hall of Fame as an owner, executive, or NFL commissioner
*	Currently active as an NFL head coach

== Coaches ==
Note: Statistics are correct through Week 10 of the 2026 NFL season.

=== Champion coaches ===
#	Name	Date of Birth	First	Last	Regular season						Playoffs				Achievements			Ref.
#	Name	Date of Birth	First	Last	Yrs	G	W	L	T	W%	Yrs.	G	W	L	CH	SB	CC	Ref.
1	Paul Brown ^{†}	September 7, 1908	1946	1975	25	326	213	104	9	.667	15	17	9	8	7	0	0	
2	Bill Belichick	April 16, 1952	1991	2023	29	467	302	165	0	.647	19	44	31	13	6	6	9	
3	George Halas ^{†}	February 2, 1895	1920	1967	40	497	318	148	31	.671	8	9	6	3	6	0	0	
4	Curly Lambeau ^{†}	April 9, 1898	1921	1953	33	380	226	132	22	.624	5	5	3	2	6	0	0	
5	Vince Lombardi ^{†}	June 11, 1913	1959	1969	10	136	96	34	6	.728	6	10	9	1	5	2	2	
6	Chuck Noll ^{†}	January 5, 1932	1969	1991	23	342	193	148	1	.566	12	24	16	8	4	4	4	
7	Guy Chamberlin ^{†}	January 16, 1894	1922	1927	6	81	58	16	7	.759	0	0	0	0	4	0	0	
8	Andy Reid*	March 19, 1958	1999	2026	28	446	286	159	1	.642	20	45	28	17	3	3	6	
9	Joe Gibbs ^{†}	November 25, 1940	1981	2007	16	248	154	94	0	.621	10	24	17	7	3	3	4	
10	Bill Walsh ^{†}	November 30, 1931	1979	1988	10	152	92	59	1	.609	7	14	10	4	3	3	3	
11	Weeb Ewbank ^{†}	May 6, 1907	1954	1973	20	266	130	129	7	.502	4	5	4	1	3	1	1	
12	Tom Landry ^{†}	September 11, 1924	1960	1988	29	418	250	162	6	.605	18	36	20	16	2	2	5	
13	Don Shula ^{†}	January 4, 1930	1963	1995	33	490	328	156	6	.676	19	36	19	17	2	2	6	
14	Tom Coughlin	August 31, 1946	1995	2015	20	320	170	150	0	.531	9	19	12	7	2	2	2	
15	Bill Parcells ^{†}	August 22, 1941	1983	2006	19	303	172	130	1	.569	10	19	11	8	2	2	3	
16	George Seifert	January 22, 1940	1989	2001	11	176	114	62	0	.648	7	15	10	5	2	2	2	
17	Jimmy Johnson ^{†}	July 16, 1943	1989	1999	9	144	80	64	0	.556	6	13	9	4	2	2	2	
18	Mike Shanahan	August 24, 1952	1988	2013	20	308	170	138	0	.552	8	14	8	6	2	2	2	
19	Tom Flores ^{†}	March 21, 1937	1979	1994	12	184	97	87	0	.527	5	11	8	3	2	2	2	
20	Hank Stram ^{†}	January 3, 1924	1960	1977	17	238	131	97	10	.571	5	8	5	3	2	1	2	
21	Buddy Parker	December 16, 1913	1949	1964	15	188	104	75	9	.577	3	4	3	1	2	0	0	
22	Greasy Neale ^{†}	November 5, 1891	1941	1950	10	111	63	43	5	.590	3	4	3	1	2	0	0	
23	Steve Owen ^{†}	April 21, 1898	1930	1953	24	270	153	100	17	.598	10	10	2	8	2	0	0	
24	Ray Flaherty ^{†}	September 1, 1903	1936	1949	11	122	80	37	5	.676	6	6	2	4	2	0	0	
25	Lou Saban	October 13, 1921	1960	1976	16	201	95	99	7	.490	4	4	2	2	2	0	0	
26	Jimmy Conzelman ^{†}	March 6, 1898	1921	1948	15	167	87	63	17	.572	2	2	1	1	2	0	0	
27	John Harbaugh*	September 23, 1962	2008	2026	19	302	185	116	1	.614	12	24	13	11	1	1	1	
28	Mike Holmgren	June 15, 1948	1992	2008	17	272	161	111	0	.592	12	24	13	11	1	1	3	
29	Bill Cowher ^{†}	May 8, 1957	1992	2006	15	240	149	90	1	.623	10	21	12	9	1	1	2	
30	Mike McCarthy*	November 10, 1963	2006	2026	19	297	180	115	2	.609	12	22	11	11	1	1	1	
31	Pete Carroll	September 15, 1951	1994	2025	19	308	173	134	1	.563	12	22	11	11	1	1	2	
32	Sean Payton*	December 29, 1963	2006	2026	19	301	191	110	0	.635	11	20	10	10	1	1	1	
33	Sean McVay*	January 24, 1986	2017	2026	10	159	98	61	0	.616	7	16	10	6	1	1	2	
34	Tony Dungy ^{†}	October 6, 1955	1996	2008	13	208	139	69	0	.668	11	19	9	10	1	1	1	
35	John Madden ^{†}	April 10, 1936	1969	1978	10	142	103	32	7	.750	8	16	9	7	1	1	1	
36	Mike Tomlin	March 15, 1972	2007	2025	19	309	193	114	2	.628	13	20	8	12	1	1	2	
37	Mike Ditka ^{‡}	October 18, 1939	1982	1999	14	216	121	95	0	.560	7	12	6	6	1	1	1	
38	Dick Vermeil ^{†}	October 30, 1936	1976	2005	15	229	120	109	0	.524	6	11	6	5	1	1	2	
39	Nick Sirianni*	June 15, 1981	2021	2026	6	94	61	33	0	.649	5	10	6	4	1	1	2	
40	Bruce Arians	October 3, 1952	2013	2021	8	129	80	48	1	.624	4	9	6	3	1	1	1	
41	Jon Gruden	August 17, 1963	1998	2021	15	229	117	112	0	.511	5	9	5	4	1	1	1	
42	Brian Billick	February 28, 1954	1999	2007	9	144	80	64	0	.556	4	8	5	3	1	1	1	
43	Doug Pederson	January 31, 1968	2016	2024	8	131	64	66	1	.492	4	8	5	3	1	1	1	
44	Gary Kubiak	August 15, 1961	2006	2016	10	157	82	75	0	.522	3	7	5	2	1	1	1	
45	Barry Switzer	October 5, 1937	1994	1997	4	64	40	24	0	.625	3	7	5	2	1	1	1	
46	Don McCafferty	March 12, 1921	1970	1973	4	47	28	17	2	.617	2	5	4	1	1	1	1	
47	Blanton Collier	July 2, 1906	1963	1970	8	112	76	34	2	.688	5	7	3	4	1	0	0	
48	Mike Macdonald*	June 26, 1987	2024	2026	3	44	30	14	0	.682	1	3	3	0	1	1	1	
49	Jim Lee Howell	September 27, 1914	1954	1960	7	84	53	27	4	.655	3	4	2	2	1	0	0	
50	Buck Shaw	March 28, 1899	1946	1960	12	150	90	55	5	.617	2	3	2	1	1	0	0	
51	Joe Stydahar ^{‡}	March 17, 1912	1950	1954	5	49	20	28	1	.418	2	3	2	1	1	0	0	
52	George Wilson	February 3, 1914	1957	1969	12	160	68	84	8	.450	1	2	2	0	1	0	0	
53	Sid Gillman ^{†}	October 26, 1911	1955	1974	18	228	122	99	7	.550	6	6	1	5	1	0	0	
54	Wally Lemm	October 23, 1919	1961	1970	10	135	64	64	7	.500	3	3	1	2	1	0	0	
55	Hunk Anderson	September 22, 1898	1942	1945	4	36	23	11	2	.667	2	2	1	1	1	0	0	
56	Luke Johnsos	December 9, 1905	1942	1945	4	36	23	11	2	.667	2	2	1	1	1	0	0	
57	George Clark	March 20, 1894	1931	1940	10	118	64	42	12	.593	1	1	1	0	1	0	0	
58	Adam Walsh	December 4, 1901	1945	1946	2	21	15	5	1	.738	1	1	1	0	1	0	0	
59	Lou Rymkus	November 6, 1919	1960	1961	2	19	11	7	1	.605	1	1	1	0	1	0	0	
60	Ralph Jones	September 22, 1880	1930	1932	3	41	24	10	7	.671	0	0	0	0	1	0	0	
61	Norman Barry	December 25, 1897	1925	1926	2	26	16	8	2	.654	0	0	0	0	1	0	0	
62	Elgie Tobin	May 7, 1886	1920	1921	2	23	16	3	4	.783	0	0	0	0	1	0	0	
63	Earl Potteiger	February 11, 1893	1924	1928	3	31	15	12	4	.548	0	0	0	0	1	0	0	

=== Playoff coaches ===
#	Name	Date of Birth	First	Last	Regular season						Playoffs				Achievements			Ref.
#	Name	Date of Birth	First	Last	Yrs	G	W	L	T	W%	Yrs.	G	W	L	CH	SB	CC	Ref.
64	Dan Reeves	January 19, 1944	1981	2003	23	357	190	165	2	.535	9	20	11	9	0	0	4	
65	Marv Levy ^{†}	August 3, 1925	1978	1997	17	255	143	112	0	.561	8	19	11	8	0	0	4	
66	Bud Grant ^{†}	May 20, 1927	1967	1985	18	259	158	96	5	.620	12	22	10	12	0	0	4	
67	Kyle Shanahan*	December 14, 1979	2017	2026	10	158	90	68	0	.570	5	14	9	5	0	0	2	
68	Sean McDermott	March 21, 1974	2017	2025	9	148	98	50	0	.662	8	16	8	8	0	0	0	
69	John Fox	February 8, 1955	2002	2017	16	256	133	123	0	.520	7	15	8	7	0	0	2	
70	Chuck Knox	April 27, 1932	1973	1994	22	334	186	147	1	.558	11	18	7	11	0	0	0	
71	Marty Schottenheimer	September 23, 1943	1984	2006	21	327	200	126	1	.613	13	18	5	13	0	0	0	
72	Jeff Fisher	February 25, 1958	1994	2016	22	339	173	165	1	.512	6	11	5	6	0	0	1	
73	Jim Harbaugh*	December 23, 1963	2011	2026	7	107	67	39	1	.631	5	10	5	5	0	0	1	
74	Mike Vrabel*	August 14, 1975	2018	2026	8	126	73	53	0	.579	4	9	5	4	0	0	1	
75	Dan Quinn*	September 11, 1970	2015	2026	9	128	63	64	1	.496	3	8	5	3	0	0	1	
76	Zac Taylor*	May 10, 1983	2019	2026	8	125	59	65	1	.476	2	7	5	2	0	0	1	
77	Dennis Green	February 17, 1949	1992	2006	13	207	113	94	0	.546	8	12	4	8	0	0	0	
78	John Robinson	July 25, 1935	1983	1991	9	143	75	68	0	.524	6	10	4	6	0	0	0	
79	Norv Turner	May 17, 1952	1994	2012	15	237	114	122	1	.483	4	8	4	4	0	0	0	
80	Bum Phillips	September 29, 1923	1975	1985	11	159	82	77	0	.516	3	7	4	3	0	0	0	
81	Rex Ryan	December 13, 1962	2009	2016	8	127	61	66	0	.480	2	6	4	2	0	0	0	
82	Ken Whisenhunt	February 28, 1962	2007	2015	8	119	48	71	0	.403	2	6	4	2	0	0	1	
83	Don Coryell ^{†}	October 17, 1924	1973	1986	14	195	111	83	1	.572	6	9	3	6	0	0	0	
84	Matt LaFleur*	November 3, 1979	2019	2026	8	127	82	44	1	.650	6	9	3	6	0	0	0	
85	Ron Rivera	January 7, 1962	2011	2023	13	207	102	103	2	.498	5	8	3	5	0	0	1	
86	Bobby Ross	December 23, 1935	1992	2000	9	137	74	63	0	.540	5	8	3	5	0	0	1	
87	Steve Mariucci	November 4, 1955	1997	2005	9	139	72	67	0	.518	4	7	3	4	0	0	0	
88	Jerry Glanville	October 14, 1941	1985	1993	9	129	60	69	0	.465	4	7	3	4	0	0	0	
89	Mike Martz	May 13, 1951	2000	2005	6	85	53	32	0	.624	4	7	3	4	0	0	1	
90	Lovie Smith	May 8, 1958	2004	2022	12	193	92	100	1	.479	3	6	3	3	0	0	1	
91	Chuck Pagano	October 2, 1960	2012	2017	6	96	53	43	0	.552	3	6	3	3	0	0	0	
92	Jerry Burns	January 24, 1927	1986	1991	6	95	52	43	0	.547	3	6	3	3	0	0	0	
93	Ray Malavasi	November 8, 1930	1966	1982	6	85	44	41	0	.518	3	6	3	3	0	0	1	
94	DeMeco Ryans*	July 28, 1984	2023	2026	4	60	35	25	0	.583	3	6	3	3	0	0	0	
95	Sam Wyche	January 5, 1945	1984	1995	12	191	84	107	0	.440	2	5	3	2	0	0	1	
96	Raymond Berry ^{‡}	February 27, 1933	1984	1989	6	87	48	39	0	.552	2	5	3	2	0	0	1	
97	George Allen ^{†}	April 29, 1922	1966	1977	12	168	116	47	5	.705	7	9	2	7	0	0	1	
98	Ted Marchibroda	March 15, 1931	1975	1998	12	186	87	98	1	.470	4	6	2	4	0	0	0	
99	Jim Caldwell	January 16, 1955	2009	2017	7	112	62	50	0	.554	4	6	2	4	0	0	1	
100	Mike Sherman	December 19, 1954	2000	2005	6	96	57	39	0	.594	4	6	2	4	0	0	0	
101	Herm Edwards	April 27, 1954	2001	2008	8	128	54	74	0	.422	4	6	2	4	0	0	0	
102	Bill O'Brien	October 23, 1969	2014	2020	7	100	52	48	0	.520	4	6	2	4	0	0	0	
103	Jason Garrett	March 28, 1966	2010	2019	10	152	85	67	0	.559	3	5	2	3	0	0	0	
104	Dave Wannstedt	May 21, 1952	1993	2004	11	169	82	87	0	.485	3	5	2	3	0	0	0	
105	Mike Zimmer	June 5, 1956	2014	2021	8	129	72	56	1	.562	3	5	2	3	0	0	0	
106	Dick Nolan	March 26, 1932	1968	1980	11	156	69	82	5	.458	3	5	2	3	0	0	0	
107	Jim Fassel	August 31, 1949	1997	2003	7	112	58	53	1	.522	3	5	2	3	0	0	1	
108	Art Shell ^{‡}	November 26, 1946	1989	2006	7	108	56	52	0	.519	3	5	2	3	0	0	0	
109	Red Miller	October 31, 1927	1977	1980	4	62	40	22	0	.645	3	5	2	3	0	0	1	
110	Forrest Gregg ^{‡}	October 18, 1933	1975	1987	11	161	75	85	1	.469	2	4	2	2	0	0	1	
111	Dan Campbell*	April 13, 1976	2015	2026	7	106	60	45	1	.571	2	4	2	2	0	0	0	
112	John Rauch	August 20, 1927	1966	1970	5	70	40	28	2	.586	2	4	2	2	0	0	1	
113	Walt Michaels	October 16, 1929	1977	1982	6	87	39	47	1	.454	2	4	2	2	0	0	0	
114	Doug Marrone	July 25, 1964	2013	2020	7	98	38	60	0	.388	1	3	2	1	0	0	0	
115	Bill Callahan	July 31, 1956	2002	2019	3	43	18	25	0	.419	1	3	2	1	0	0	1	
116	Jack Pardee	April 19, 1936	1975	1994	11	164	87	77	0	.530	5	6	1	5	0	0	0	
117	Wade Phillips	June 21, 1947	1985	2013	12	146	82	64	0	.562	5	6	1	5	0	0	0	
118	Wayne Fontes	February 2, 1940	1988	1996	9	133	66	67	0	.496	4	5	1	4	0	0	0	
119	Mike Smith	June 13, 1959	2008	2014	7	112	66	46	0	.589	4	5	1	4	0	0	0	
120	Jack Del Rio	April 4, 1963	2003	2017	12	187	93	94	0	.497	3	4	1	3	0	0	0	
121	Todd Bowles*	November 18, 1963	2011	2026	10	144	64	80	0	.444	3	4	1	3	0	0	0	
122	Leeman Bennett	June 20, 1938	1977	1986	8	119	50	69	0	.420	3	4	1	3	0	0	0	
123	John McKay	July 5, 1923	1976	1984	9	133	44	88	1	.335	3	4	1	3	0	0	0	
124	Joe Walton	December 15, 1935	1983	1989	7	111	53	57	1	.482	2	3	1	2	0	0	0	
125	Kevin Stefanski*	May 8, 1982	2020	2026	7	111	48	63	0	.432	2	3	1	2	0	0	0	
126	Frank Reich	December 4, 1961	2018	2023	6	85	41	43	1	.488	2	3	1	2	0	0	0	
127	Brad Childress	June 27, 1956	2006	2010	5	74	39	35	0	.527	2	3	1	2	0	0	0	
128	Ray Rhodes	October 20, 1950	1995	1999	5	80	37	42	1	.469	2	3	1	2	0	0	0	
129	Bart Starr ^{‡}	January 9, 1934	1975	1983	9	131	52	76	3	.408	1	2	1	1	0	0	0	
130	Mike Holovak	September 19, 1919	1961	1976	9	108	52	47	9	.523	1	2	1	1	0	0	0	
131	Dom Capers	August 7, 1950	1995	2005	8	128	48	80	0	.375	1	2	1	1	0	0	0	
132	Jim Haslett	December 9, 1955	2000	2008	7	108	47	61	0	.435	1	2	1	1	0	0	0	
133	Ray Perkins	December 6, 1941	1979	1990	8	117	42	75	0	.359	1	2	1	1	0	0	0	
134	Rich Kotite	October 13, 1942	1991	1996	6	96	40	56	0	.417	1	2	1	1	0	0	0	
135	Mike Mularkey	November 19, 1961	2004	2017	6	89	36	53	0	.404	1	2	1	1	0	0	0	
136	Anthony Lynn	December 21, 1968	2016	2020	5	65	33	32	0	.508	1	2	1	1	0	0	0	
137	Mike Tice	February 2, 1959	2001	2005	5	65	32	33	0	.492	1	2	1	1	0	0	0	
138	Jim L. Mora	November 19, 1961	2004	2009	4	64	31	33	0	.484	1	2	1	1	0	0	0	
139	Mike McCoy	April 1, 1972	2013	2025	5	75	29	46	0	.387	1	2	1	1	0	0	0	
140	Vince Tobin	September 29, 1943	1996	2000	5	71	28	43	0	.394	1	2	1	1	0	0	0	
141	Brian Daboll	April 14, 1975	2022	2025	4	61	20	40	1	.336	1	2	1	1	0	0	0	
142	Red Dawson	December 20, 1906	1946	1949	4	48	19	25	4	.438	1	2	1	1	0	0	0	
143	Ben Johnson*	May 11, 1986	2025	2026	2	26	18	8	0	.692	1	2	1	1	0	0	0	
144	Bud Carson	April 28, 1931	1989	1990	2	25	11	13	1	.460	1	2	1	1	0	0	0	
145	Dutch Bergman	February 23, 1895	1943		1	10	6	3	1	.650	1	2	1	1	0	0	0	
146	Marvin Lewis	September 23, 1958	2003	2018	16	256	131	122	3	.518	7	7	0	7	0	0	0	
147	Jim E. Mora	May 24, 1935	1986	2001	15	231	125	106	0	.541	6	6	0	6	0	0	0	
148	Allie Sherman	February 10, 1923	1961	1968	8	112	57	51	4	.527	3	3	0	3	0	0	0	
149	Buddy Ryan	February 17, 1931	1986	1995	7	111	55	55	1	.500	3	3	0	3	0	0	0	
150	Ron Meyer	February 17, 1941	1982	1991	9	104	54	50	0	.519	2	2	0	2	0	0	0	
151	Monte Clark	January 24, 1937	1976	1984	8	119	51	67	1	.433	2	2	0	2	0	0	0	
152	Kevin O'Connell*	May 25, 1985	2022	2026	5	77	50	27	0	.649	2	2	0	2	0	0	0	
153	Sam Rutigliano	July 1, 1932	1978	1984	7	97	47	50	0	.485	2	2	0	2	0	0	0	
154	Chuck Fairbanks	June 10, 1933	1973	1978	6	85	46	39	0	.541	2	2	0	2	0	0	0	
155	Nick Skorich	June 26, 1921	1961	1974	7	98	45	48	5	.485	2	2	0	2	0	0	0	
156	Mike McDaniel	March 6, 1983	2022	2025	4	68	35	33	0	.515	2	2	0	2	0	0	0	
157	Chan Gailey	January 5, 1952	1998	2012	5	80	34	46	0	.425	2	2	0	2	0	0	0	
158	Matt Nagy	April 24, 1978	2018	2021	4	65	34	31	0	.523	2	2	0	2	0	0	0	
159	Dick Jauron	October 7, 1950	1999	2009	10	142	60	82	0	.423	1	1	0	1	0	0	0	
160	Bruce Coslet	August 5, 1946	1990	2000	9	124	47	77	0	.379	1	1	0	1	0	0	0	
161	Joe Schmidt ^{‡}	January 19, 1932	1967	1972	6	84	43	34	7	.554	1	1	0	1	0	0	0	
162	Jim Hanifan	September 21, 1933	1980	1989	7	93	39	53	1	.425	1	1	0	1	0	0	0	
163	Lindy Infante	March 27, 1940	1988	1997	6	96	36	60	0	.375	1	1	0	1	0	0	0	
164	Jay Gruden	March 4, 1967	2014	2019	6	85	35	49	1	.418	1	1	0	1	0	0	0	
165	Eric Mangini	January 10, 1971	2006	2010	5	80	33	47	0	.413	1	1	0	1	0	0	0	
166	Adam Gase	March 29, 1978	2016	2020	5	80	32	48	0	.400	1	1	0	1	0	0	0	
167	Pop Ivy	January 25, 1916	1958	1963	6	76	32	42	2	.434	1	1	0	1	0	0	0	
168	Tony Sparano	October 7, 1961	2008	2014	5	73	32	41	0	.438	1	1	0	1	0	0	0	
169	Paddy Driscoll ^{‡}	January 11, 1895	1920	1957	5	53	31	17	5	.632	1	1	0	1	0	0	0	
170	Neill Armstrong	March 9, 1926	1978	1981	4	64	30	34	0	.469	1	1	0	1	0	0	0	
171	John Mackovic	October 1, 1943	1983	1986	4	64	30	34	0	.469	1	1	0	1	0	0	0	
172	Jim Schwartz	June 2, 1966	2009	2013	5	80	29	51	0	.363	1	1	0	1	0	0	0	
173	Kliff Kingsbury	August 9, 1979	2019	2022	4	66	28	37	1	.432	1	1	0	1	0	0	0	
174	Chip Kelly	November 25, 1963	2013	2016	4	63	28	35	0	.444	1	1	0	1	0	0	0	
175	Jock Sutherland	March 21, 1889	1940	1947	4	45	28	16	1	.633	1	1	0	1	0	0	0	
176	Hamp Pool	March 11, 1915	1946	1954	5	47	26	19	2	.574	1	1	0	1	0	0	0	
177	Dudley DeGroot	November 20, 1899	1944	1947	4	45	26	16	3	.611	1	1	0	1	0	0	0	
178	Dan Devine	December 23, 1924	1971	1974	4	56	25	27	4	.482	1	1	0	1	0	0	0	
179	Butch Davis	November 17, 1951	2001	2004	4	59	24	35	0	.407	1	1	0	1	0	0	0	
180	Brandon Staley	December 10, 1982	2021	2023	3	48	24	24	0	.500	1	1	0	1	0	0	0	
181	Red Strader	December 21, 1904	1948	1955	4	46	24	22	0	.522	1	1	0	1	0	0	0	
182	June Jones	February 19, 1953	1994	1998	4	58	22	36	0	.379	1	1	0	1	0	0	0	
183	Leslie Frazier	April 3, 1959	2010	2013	4	54	21	32	1	.398	1	1	0	1	0	0	0	
184	Liam Coen*	November 8, 1985	2025	2026	2	26	20	6	0	.769	1	1	0	1	0	0	0	
185	Todd Haley	February 28, 1967	2009	2011	3	45	19	26	0	.422	1	1	0	1	0	0	0	
186	Frankie Albert	January 27, 1920	1956	1958	3	36	19	16	1	.542	1	1	0	1	0	0	0	
187	Dave Canales*	May 7, 1981	2024	2026	3	43	17	26	0	.395	1	1	0	1	0	0	0	
188	Clark Shaughnessy	March 6, 1892	1948	1949	2	24	14	7	3	.646	1	1	0	1	0	0	0	
189	Joe Collier	June 7, 1932	1966	1968	3	30	13	16	1	.450	1	1	0	1	0	0	0	
190	Ben McAdoo	July 9, 1977	2016	2017	2	28	13	15	0	.464	1	1	0	1	0	0	0	
191	Cecil Isbell	July 11, 1915	1947	1951	4	34	10	23	1	.309	1	1	0	1	0	0	0	
192	Rich Bisaccia	June 3, 1960	2021		1	12	7	5	0	.583	1	1	0	1	0	0	0	
193	Clem Crowe	October 18, 1903	1949	1950	2	18	5	12	1	.306	1	1	0	1	0	0	0	

=== Remaining coaches ===
#	Name	Date of Birth	First	Last	Regular season						Playoffs				Achievements			Ref.
#	Name	Date of Birth	First	Last	Yrs	G	W	L	T	W%	Yrs.	G	W	L	CH	SB	CC	Ref.
194	Norm Van Brocklin ^{‡}	March 15, 1926	1961	1974	13	173	66	100	7	.402	0	0	0	0	0	0	0	
195	Joe Kuharich	April 14, 1917	1952	1968	11	142	58	81	3	.419	0	0	0	0	0	0	0	
196	LeRoy Andrews	June 27, 1896	1924	1931	8	82	51	27	4	.646	0	0	0	0	0	0	0	
197	Charley Winner	July 2, 1924	1966	1975	7	93	44	44	5	.500	0	0	0	0	0	0	0	
198	Dennis Erickson	March 24, 1947	1995	2004	6	96	40	56	0	.417	0	0	0	0	0	0	0	
199	Dan Henning	June 21, 1942	1983	1991	7	112	38	73	1	.344	0	0	0	0	0	0	0	
200	Raheem Morris	September 3, 1976	2009	2025	6	93	37	56	0	.398	0	0	0	0	0	0	0	
201	Jack Patera	August 1, 1933	1976	1982	7	94	35	59	0	.372	0	0	0	0	0	0	0	
202	Tommy Prothro	July 20, 1920	1971	1978	7	88	35	51	2	.409	0	0	0	0	0	0	0	
203	Marion Campbell	May 25, 1929	1974	1989	9	115	34	80	1	.300	0	0	0	0	0	0	0	
204	John Ralston	April 26, 1927	1972	1976	5	70	34	33	3	.507	0	0	0	0	0	0	0	
205	Tommy Hughitt	December 27, 1892	1920	1924	5	56	34	15	7	.670	0	0	0	0	0	0	0	
206	Dick Rauch	July 15, 1893	1925	1929	5	60	33	24	3	.575	0	0	0	0	0	0	0	
207	Romeo Crennel	June 18, 1947	2005	2020	7	95	32	63	0	.337	0	0	0	0	0	0	0	
208	Walt Kiesling ^{‡}	May 27, 1903	1939	1956	9	90	30	55	5	.361	0	0	0	0	0	0	0	
209	Dutch Clark ^{‡}	October 11, 1906	1937	1942	6	66	30	34	2	.470	0	0	0	0	0	0	0	
210	Mike McCormack ^{‡}	June 21, 1930	1973	1982	6	81	29	51	1	.364	0	0	0	0	0	0	0	
211	Alex Webster	April 19, 1931	1969	1973	5	70	29	40	1	.421	0	0	0	0	0	0	0	
212	Shane Steichen*	May 11, 1985	2023	2026	4	61	28	33	0	.459	0	0	0	0	0	0	0	
213	Red Hickey	February 14, 1917	1959	1963	5	55	27	27	1	.500	0	0	0	0	0	0	0	
214	Dennis Allen	September 22, 1972	2012	2024	6	79	26	53	0	.329	0	0	0	0	0	0	0	
215	Jack Christiansen ^{‡}	December 20, 1928	1963	1967	5	67	26	38	3	.410	0	0	0	0	0	0	0	
216	Joe Philbin	July 2, 1961	2012	2018	5	56	26	30	0	.464	0	0	0	0	0	0	0	
217	Jim Trimble	May 29, 1918	1952	1955	4	48	25	20	3	.552	0	0	0	0	0	0	0	
218	Joe Bugel	March 10, 1940	1990	1997	5	80	24	56	0	.300	0	0	0	0	0	0	0	
219	Brian Flores	February 24, 1981	2019	2021	3	49	24	25	0	.490	0	0	0	0	0	0	0	
220	Gene Stallings	March 2, 1935	1986	1989	4	58	23	34	1	.405	0	0	0	0	0	0	0	
221	Al Davis ^{^}	July 4, 1929	1963	1965	3	42	23	16	3	.583	0	0	0	0	0	0	0	
222	Gregg Williams	July 15, 1958	2001	2018	4	56	22	34	0	.393	0	0	0	0	0	0	0	
223	Mike Munchak ^{‡}	March 5, 1960	2011	2013	3	48	22	26	0	.458	0	0	0	0	0	0	0	
224	Harland Svare	November 15, 1930	1962	1973	7	74	21	48	5	.318	0	0	0	0	0	0	0	
225	Bill McPeak	July 24, 1926	1961	1965	5	70	21	46	3	.321	0	0	0	0	0	0	0	
226	Robert Saleh*	January 31, 1979	2021	2026	5	65	21	44	0	.323	0	0	0	0	0	0	0	
227	Arthur Smith	May 27, 1982	2021	2023	3	51	21	30	0	.412	0	0	0	0	0	0	0	
228	Ron Erhardt	February 27, 1932	1978	1981	4	49	21	28	0	.429	0	0	0	0	0	0	0	
229	Joe Bach	January 17, 1901	1935	1953	4	48	21	27	0	.438	0	0	0	0	0	0	0	
230	Phil Bengtson	July 17, 1913	1968	1972	4	47	21	25	1	.457	0	0	0	0	0	0	0	
231	Jim Dooley	February 8, 1930	1968	1971	4	56	20	36	0	.357	0	0	0	0	0	0	0	
232	Gus Dorais	July 2, 1891	1943	1947	5	53	20	31	2	.396	0	0	0	0	0	0	0	
233	Josh McDaniels	April 22, 1976	2009	2023	4	53	20	33	0	.377	0	0	0	0	0	0	0	
234	John Michelosen	February 13, 1916	1948	1951	4	48	20	26	2	.438	0	0	0	0	0	0	0	
235	Dave Shula	May 28, 1959	1992	1996	5	71	19	52	0	.268	0	0	0	0	0	0	0	
236	Pat Shurmur	April 14, 1965	2011	2019	5	65	19	46	0	.292	0	0	0	0	0	0	0	
237	Vic Fangio	August 22, 1958	2019	2021	3	49	19	30	0	.388	0	0	0	0	0	0	0	
238	Dirk Koetter	February 5, 1959	2016	2018	3	48	19	29	0	.396	0	0	0	0	0	0	0	
239	Darryl Rogers	May 28, 1935	1985	1988	4	58	18	40	0	.310	0	0	0	0	0	0	0	
240	Mike Nolan	March 7, 1959	2005	2008	4	55	18	37	0	.327	0	0	0	0	0	0	0	
241	Sammy Baugh ^{‡}	March 17, 1914	1960	1964	3	42	18	24	0	.429	0	0	0	0	0	0	0	
242	Mike Singletary ^{‡}	October 9, 1958	2008	2010	3	40	18	22	0	.450	0	0	0	0	0	0	0	
243	Bill Johnson	July 14, 1926	1976	1978	3	33	18	15	0	.545	0	0	0	0	0	0	0	
244	Dave McGinnis	August 7, 1951	2000	2003	4	57	17	40	0	.298	0	0	0	0	0	0	0	
245	Bill Austin	October 18, 1928	1966	1970	4	56	17	36	3	.330	0	0	0	0	0	0	0	
246	Lisle Blackbourn	June 3, 1899	1954	1957	4	48	17	31	0	.354	0	0	0	0	0	0	0	
247	Tom Cable	November 26, 1964	2008	2010	3	44	17	27	0	.386	0	0	0	0	0	0	0	
248	Otto Graham ^{‡}	December 6, 1921	1966	1968	3	42	17	22	3	.440	0	0	0	0	0	0	0	
249	Al Saunders	February 1, 1947	1986	1988	3	39	17	22	0	.436	0	0	0	0	0	0	0	
250	Dewey Scanlon	August 16, 1899	1924	1929	4	36	17	15	4	.528	0	0	0	0	0	0	0	
251	Milan Creighton	January 21, 1908	1935	1938	4	46	16	26	4	.391	0	0	0	0	0	0	0	
252	Turk Edwards ^{‡}	September 28, 1907	1946	1948	3	35	16	18	1	.471	0	0	0	0	0	0	0	
253	Gunther Cunningham	June 19, 1946	1999	2000	2	32	16	16	0	.500	0	0	0	0	0	0	0	
254	Jonathan Gannon	April 4, 1983	2023	2025	3	51	15	36	0	.294	0	0	0	0	0	0	0	
255	Dave Campo	July 18, 1947	2000	2002	3	48	15	33	0	.313	0	0	0	0	0	0	0	
256	Rick Forzano	November 20, 1928	1974	1976	3	32	15	17	0	.469	0	0	0	0	0	0	0	
257	Mike White	January 4, 1936	1995	1996	2	32	15	17	0	.469	0	0	0	0	0	0	0	
258	Nick Saban	October 31, 1951	2005	2006	2	32	15	17	0	.469	0	0	0	0	0	0	0	
259	Ed Weir	March 14, 1903	1927	1928	2	26	15	7	4	.654	0	0	0	0	0	0	0	
260	Gus Bradley	July 5, 1966	2013	2016	4	62	14	48	0	.226	0	0	0	0	0	0	0	
261	Mike Riley	July 6, 1953	1999	2001	3	48	14	34	0	.292	0	0	0	0	0	0	0	
262	Paul J. Schissler	November 11, 1893	1933	1936	4	46	14	29	3	.337	0	0	0	0	0	0	0	
263	Gene Ronzani	March 28, 1909	1950	1953	4	46	14	31	1	.315	0	0	0	0	0	0	0	
264	Matt Eberflus	May 17, 1970	2022	2024	3	46	14	32	0	.304	0	0	0	0	0	0	0	
265	Jim Thorpe ^{‡}	May 28, 1888	1920	1923	4	41	14	25	2	.366	0	0	0	0	0	0	0	
266	Bo McMillin	January 12, 1895	1948	1951	4	38	14	24	0	.368	0	0	0	0	0	0	0	
267	John McVay	January 5, 1931	1976	1978	3	37	14	23	0	.378	0	0	0	0	0	0	0	
268	Ray Richards	July 16, 1906	1955	1957	3	36	14	21	1	.403	0	0	0	0	0	0	0	
269	Ray Handley	October 8, 1944	1991	1992	2	32	14	18	0	.438	0	0	0	0	0	0	0	
270	Babe Ruetz	September 23, 1893	1922	1924	3	31	14	11	6	.548	0	0	0	0	0	0	0	
271	Punk Berryman	December 13, 1893	1924	1926	2	25	14	10	1	.580	0	0	0	0	0	0	0	
272	James Phelan	December 5, 1893	1948	1952	4	50	13	35	2	.280	0	0	0	0	0	0	0	
273	Tom Fears ^{‡}	December 3, 1922	1967	1970	4	49	13	34	2	.286	0	0	0	0	0	0	0	
274	Matt Patricia	September 13, 1974	2018	2020	3	43	13	29	1	.314	0	0	0	0	0	0	0	
275	Lud Wray	February 7, 1894	1932	1935	4	41	13	25	3	.354	0	0	0	0	0	0	0	
276	Bull Behman	January 15, 1900	1929	1931	3	40	13	20	7	.413	0	0	0	0	0	0	0	
277	Rich Brooks	August 10, 1941	1995	1996	2	32	13	19	0	.406	0	0	0	0	0	0	0	
278	Marc Trestman	January 15, 1956	2013	2014	2	32	13	19	0	.406	0	0	0	0	0	0	0	
279	Cap Edwards	September 5, 1888	1921	1925	3	31	13	11	7	.532	0	0	0	0	0	0	0	
280	Arnold Horween	July 7, 1898	1923	1924	2	22	13	8	1	.614	0	0	0	0	0	0	0	
281	Dick LeBeau ^{‡}	September 9, 1937	2000	2002	3	45	12	33	0	.267	0	0	0	0	0	0	0	
282	Ernie Nevers ^{‡}	June 11, 1903	1927	1939	4	41	12	27	2	.317	0	0	0	0	0	0	0	
283	Jack Depler	January 6, 1899	1929	1931	3	38	12	21	5	.382	0	0	0	0	0	0	0	
284	Steve Spurrier	April 20, 1945	2002	2003	2	32	12	20	0	.375	0	0	0	0	0	0	0	
285	Jim Zorn	May 10, 1953	2008	2009	2	32	12	20	0	.375	0	0	0	0	0	0	0	
286	Rube Ursella	January 11, 1890	1920	1925	3	25	12	8	5	.580	0	0	0	0	0	0	0	
287	Hue Jackson	October 22, 1965	2011	2018	4	56	11	44	1	.205	0	0	0	0	0	0	0	
288	Steve Spagnuolo	December 21, 1959	2009	2017	4	52	11	41	0	.212	0	0	0	0	0	0	0	
289	Abe Gibron	September 22, 1925	1972	1974	3	42	11	30	1	.274	0	0	0	0	0	0	0	
290	Frank Kush	January 20, 1929	1982	1984	3	40	11	28	1	.288	0	0	0	0	0	0	0	
291	Matt Rhule	January 31, 1975	2020	2022	3	38	11	27	0	.289	0	0	0	0	0	0	0	
292	Scott Linehan	September 17, 1963	2006	2008	3	36	11	25	0	.306	0	0	0	0	0	0	0	
293	Paul Wiggin	November 18, 1934	1975	1977	3	35	11	24	0	.314	0	0	0	0	0	0	0	
294	Johnny North	June 17, 1921	1973	1975	3	34	11	23	0	.324	0	0	0	0	0	0	0	
295	Greg Schiano	June 1, 1966	2012	2013	2	32	11	21	0	.344	0	0	0	0	0	0	0	
296	Vance Joseph	September 20, 1972	2017	2018	2	32	11	21	0	.344	0	0	0	0	0	0	0	
297	Buster Ramsey	March 16, 1920	1960	1961	2	28	11	16	1	.411	0	0	0	0	0	0	0	
298	Brian Schottenheimer*	October 16, 1973	2025	2026	2	27	11	15	1	.426	0	0	0	0	0	0	0	
299	William Henry Dietz	August 17, 1884	1933	1934	2	24	11	11	2	.500	0	0	0	0	0	0	0	
300	Tommy Hudspeth	September 14, 1931	1976	1977	2	24	11	13	0	.458	0	0	0	0	0	0	0	
301	Bert Bell ^{^}	February 25, 1895	1936	1941	6	58	10	46	2	.190	0	0	0	0	0	0	0	
302	Rod Marinelli	July 13, 1949	2006	2008	3	48	10	38	0	.208	0	0	0	0	0	0	0	
303	Kay Stephenson	December 17, 1944	1983	1985	3	36	10	26	0	.278	0	0	0	0	0	0	0	
304	Joe Judge	December 31, 1981	2020	2021	2	33	10	23	0	.303	0	0	0	0	0	0	0	
305	Mike Pettine	September 25, 1966	2014	2015	2	32	10	22	0	.313	0	0	0	0	0	0	0	
306	Harry Gilmer	April 14, 1926	1965	1966	2	28	10	16	2	.393	0	0	0	0	0	0	0	
307	Guil Falcon	December 15, 1892	1920	1923	3	25	10	10	5	.500	0	0	0	0	0	0	0	
308	Bob Waterfield ^{‡}	July 26, 1920	1960	1962	3	34	9	24	1	.279	0	0	0	0	0	0	0	
309	Jack Faulkner	April 4, 1926	1962	1964	3	32	9	22	1	.297	0	0	0	0	0	0	0	
310	John Mazur	June 17, 1930	1970	1972	3	30	9	21	0	.300	0	0	0	0	0	0	0	
311	Bud Wilkinson	April 23, 1916	1978	1979	2	29	9	20	0	.310	0	0	0	0	0	0	0	
312	Steve Wilks	August 8, 1969	2018	2022	2	28	9	19	0	.321	0	0	0	0	0	0	0	
313	Antonio Pierce	October 26, 1978	2023	2024	2	26	9	17	0	.346	0	0	0	0	0	0	0	
314	Kellen Moore*	July 5, 1988	2025	2026	2	26	9	17	0	.346	0	0	0	0	0	0	0	
315	John McEwan	February 18, 1893	1933	1934	2	21	9	11	1	.452	0	0	0	0	0	0	0	
316	Joe Vitt	August 23, 1954	2005	2012	2	21	9	12	0	.429	0	0	0	0	0	0	0	
317	Charlie Waller	December 26, 1921	1969	1970	2	19	9	7	3	.553	0	0	0	0	0	0	0	
318	Bud Talbott	June 10, 1892	1920	1921	2	18	9	6	3	.583	0	0	0	0	0	0	0	
319	Al Groh	July 13, 1944	2000		1	16	9	7	0	.563	0	0	0	0	0	0	0	
320	Carl Storck	November 14, 1892	1922	1926	5	38	8	26	4	.263	0	0	0	0	0	0	0	
321	Dick MacPherson	November 4, 1930	1991	1992	2	32	8	24	0	.250	0	0	0	0	0	0	0	
322	Frank Gansz	November 22, 1938	1987	1988	2	31	8	22	1	.274	0	0	0	0	0	0	0	
323	Ed Biles	October 18, 1931	1981	1983	3	31	8	23	0	.258	0	0	0	0	0	0	0	
324	Hugh Campbell	May 21, 1941	1984	1985	2	30	8	22	0	.267	0	0	0	0	0	0	0	
325	Bob Hollway	January 29, 1926	1971	1972	2	28	8	18	2	.321	0	0	0	0	0	0	0	
326	Homer Rice	February 20, 1927	1978	1979	2	27	8	19	0	.296	0	0	0	0	0	0	0	
327	Ed Khayat	September 14, 1935	1971	1972	2	25	8	15	2	.360	0	0	0	0	0	0	0	
328	Doug Wycoff	September 16, 1903	1929	1930	2	22	8	9	5	.477	0	0	0	0	0	0	0	
329	Doc Alexander	April 1, 1897	1922	1926	2	18	8	8	2	.500	0	0	0	0	0	0	0	
330	Jack Forsyth	May 4, 1892	1920	1921	2	16	8	6	2	.563	0	0	0	0	0	0	0	
331	Fritz Pollard ^{‡}	January 27, 1894	1921	1925	2	13	8	4	1	.654	0	0	0	0	0	0	0	
332	Bob Folwell	February 17, 1885	1925		1	12	8	4	0	.667	0	0	0	0	0	0	0	
333	Joe Brady*	September 23, 1989	2026		1	9	8	1	0	.889	0	0	0	0	0	0	0	
334	J. D. Roberts	October 24, 1932	1970	1972	3	35	7	25	3	.243	0	0	0	0	0	0	0	
335	Bill Arnsparger	December 16, 1926	1974	1976	3	35	7	28	0	.200	0	0	0	0	0	0	0	
336	Herb Kopf	February 3, 1895	1944	1946	3	31	7	22	2	.258	0	0	0	0	0	0	0	
337	Jerry Williams	November 1, 1923	1969	1971	3	31	7	22	2	.258	0	0	0	0	0	0	0	
338	Frank Filchock	October 18, 1916	1960	1961	2	28	7	20	1	.268	0	0	0	0	0	0	0	
339	Hugh Devore	November 25, 1910	1953	1957	3	26	7	18	1	.288	0	0	0	0	0	0	0	
340	Clipper Smith	October 15, 1898	1947	1948	2	24	7	16	1	.313	0	0	0	0	0	0	0	
341	Ralph Scott	September 26, 1894	1927		1	16	7	8	1	.469	0	0	0	0	0	0	0	
342	Mike Nixon	November 21, 1911	1959	1965	3	38	6	30	2	.184	0	0	0	0	0	0	0	
343	Mac Speedie	January 12, 1920	1964	1966	3	26	6	19	1	.250	0	0	0	0	0	0	0	
344	Johnny Blood ^{‡}	November 27, 1903	1937	1939	3	25	6	19	0	.240	0	0	0	0	0	0	0	
345	Kevin Gilbride	August 27, 1951	1997	1998	2	22	6	16	0	.273	0	0	0	0	0	0	0	
346	Jim Tomsula	April 14, 1968	2010	2015	2	17	6	11	0	.353	0	0	0	0	0	0	0	
347	Eddie Erdelatz	April 21, 1913	1960	1961	2	16	6	10	0	.375	0	0	0	0	0	0	0	
348	Freddie Kitchens	November 29, 1974	2019		1	16	6	10	0	.375	0	0	0	0	0	0	0	
349	Archie Golembeski	May 25, 1900	1925		1	12	6	5	1	.542	0	0	0	0	0	0	0	
350	Bob Snyder	February 6, 1913	1947		1	12	6	6	0	.500	0	0	0	0	0	0	0	
351	Gus Henderson	March 10, 1889	1939		1	11	6	5	0	.545	0	0	0	0	0	0	0	
352	Tut Imlay	March 20, 1902	1926		1	10	6	3	1	.650	0	0	0	0	0	0	0	
353	Harold Muller	June 12, 1901	1926		1	10	6	3	1	.650	0	0	0	0	0	0	0	
354	Todd Monken*	February 5, 1966	2026		1	10	6	4	0	.600	0	0	0	0	0	0	0	
355	Chris Palmer	September 23, 1949	1999	2000	2	32	5	27	0	.156	0	0	0	0	0	0	0	
356	Marty Mornhinweg	March 29, 1962	2001	2002	2	32	5	27	0	.156	0	0	0	0	0	0	0	
357	Rod Dowhower	April 15, 1943	1985	1986	2	29	5	24	0	.172	0	0	0	0	0	0	0	
358	Aaron Glenn*	July 16, 1972	2025	2026	2	27	5	22	0	.185	0	0	0	0	0	0	0	
359	Clive Rush	February 14, 1931	1969	1970	2	21	5	16	0	.238	0	0	0	0	0	0	0	
360	Lane Kiffin	May 9, 1975	2007	2008	2	20	5	15	0	.250	0	0	0	0	0	0	0	
361	Harry Robb	May 11, 1897	1925	1926	2	18	5	13	0	.278	0	0	0	0	0	0	0	
362	Hal Griffen	March 1, 1902	1930		1	14	5	6	3	.464	0	0	0	0	0	0	0	
363	Benny Friedman ^{‡}	March 18, 1905	1930	1932	2	14	5	9	0	.357	0	0	0	0	0	0	0	
364	Bulldog Turner ^{‡}	March 10, 1919	1962		1	14	5	9	0	.357	0	0	0	0	0	0	0	
365	Ken Meyer	July 14, 1926	1977		1	14	5	9	0	.357	0	0	0	0	0	0	0	
366	Jim Laird	September 10, 1897	1926		1	13	5	7	1	.423	0	0	0	0	0	0	0	
367	Hal Erickson	March 10, 1899	1924		1	13	5	8	0	.385	0	0	0	0	0	0	0	
368	Johnny Armstrong	August 10, 1897	1924		1	9	5	2	2	.667	0	0	0	0	0	0	0	
369	Dick Todd	October 2, 1914	1951		1	9	5	4	0	.556	0	0	0	0	0	0	0	
370	Phil Handler	July 21, 1908	1943	1951	5	38	4	34	0	.105	0	0	0	0	0	0	0	
371	Norb Hecker	May 26, 1927	1966	1968	3	31	4	26	1	.145	0	0	0	0	0	0	0	
372	Brian Callahan	June 10, 1984	2024	2025	2	23	4	19	0	.174	0	0	0	0	0	0	0	
373	Hank Bullough	January 24, 1934	1978	1986	3	22	4	18	0	.182	0	0	0	0	0	0	0	
374	Cliff Battles	May 1, 1910	1946	1947	2	21	4	16	1	.214	0	0	0	0	0	0	0	
375	Herman Ball	April 9, 1910	1949	1951	3	20	4	16	0	.200	0	0	0	0	0	0	0	
376	Richard Williamson	April 13, 1941	1990	1991	2	19	4	15	0	.211	0	0	0	0	0	0	0	
377	Red Weaver	July 19, 1897	1924	1925	2	17	4	13	0	.235	0	0	0	0	0	0	0	
378	Howard Schnellenberger	March 16, 1934	1973	1974	2	17	4	13	0	.235	0	0	0	0	0	0	0	
379	David Culley	September 17, 1955	2021		1	17	4	13	0	.235	0	0	0	0	0	0	0	
380	Jerod Mayo	February 23, 1986	2024		1	17	4	13	0	.235	0	0	0	0	0	0	0	
381	Richie Petitbon	April 18, 1938	1993		1	16	4	12	0	.250	0	0	0	0	0	0	0	
382	Rob Chudzinski	May 12, 1968	2013		1	16	4	12	0	.250	0	0	0	0	0	0	0	
383	Aldo Donelli	July 22, 1907	1941	1944	2	15	4	11	0	.267	0	0	0	0	0	0	0	
384	Nathaniel Hackett	December 19, 1979	2022		1	15	4	11	0	.267	0	0	0	0	0	0	0	
385	Bill Edwards	June 21, 1905	1941	1942	2	14	4	9	1	.321	0	0	0	0	0	0	0	
386	Ed Hughes	October 23, 1927	1971		1	14	4	9	1	.321	0	0	0	0	0	0	0	
387	Hugh Taylor	July 6, 1923	1965		1	14	4	10	0	.286	0	0	0	0	0	0	0	
388	Jim Kendrick	August 22, 1893	1923	1926	2	13	4	7	2	.385	0	0	0	0	0	0	0	
389	Edward N. Robinson	October 15, 1873	1931		1	11	4	4	3	.500	0	0	0	0	0	0	0	
390	Russell Daugherity	January 31, 1902	1927		1	10	4	4	2	.500	0	0	0	0	0	0	0	
391	Charles Rogers	January 15, 1902	1927		1	10	4	4	2	.500	0	0	0	0	0	0	0	
392	Swede Youngstrom	May 24, 1897	1927		1	10	4	4	2	.500	0	0	0	0	0	0	0	
393	Klint Kubiak*	February 17, 1987	2026		1	10	4	6	0	.400	0	0	0	0	0	0	0	
394	Jesse Minter*	May 9, 1983	2026		1	10	4	6	0	.400	0	0	0	0	0	0	0	
395	John Sandusky	December 28, 1925	1972		1	9	4	5	0	.444	0	0	0	0	0	0	0	
396	Scotty Bierce	September 3, 1896	1925		1	8	4	2	2	.625	0	0	0	0	0	0	0	
397	Art Lewis	February 18, 1911	1938		1	8	4	4	0	.500	0	0	0	0	0	0	0	
398	Joey Sternaman	February 1, 1900	1923		1	7	4	3	0	.571	0	0	0	0	0	0	0	
399	Gary Moeller	January 26, 1941	2000		1	7	4	3	0	.571	0	0	0	0	0	0	0	
400	Pete Henry ^{‡}	October 31, 1897	1926	1928	2	23	3	17	3	.196	0	0	0	0	0	0	0	
401	Jim Ringo ^{‡}	November 21, 1931	1976	1977	2	23	3	20	0	.130	0	0	0	0	0	0	0	
402	Ted Nesser	April 5, 1883	1920	1921	2	19	3	14	2	.211	0	0	0	0	0	0	0	
403	Wally Hess	October 28, 1894	1922	1924	3	18	3	12	3	.250	0	0	0	0	0	0	0	
404	Les Steckel	July 1, 1946	1984		1	16	3	13	0	.188	0	0	0	0	0	0	0	
405	Bill Marshall	October 24, 1887	1920	1921	2	15	3	8	4	.333	0	0	0	0	0	0	0	
406	George Gibson	October 2, 1905	1930		1	14	3	10	1	.250	0	0	0	0	0	0	0	
407	Lou Holtz	January 16, 1937	1976		1	13	3	10	0	.231	0	0	0	0	0	0	0	
408	Bobby Petrino	March 10, 1961	2007		1	13	3	10	0	.231	0	0	0	0	0	0	0	
409	Keith Molesworth	October 20, 1905	1953		1	12	3	9	0	.250	0	0	0	0	0	0	0	
410	Jeff Ulbrich	February 17, 1977	2024		1	12	3	9	0	.250	0	0	0	0	0	0	0	
411	Forrest Douds	April 21, 1905	1933		1	11	3	6	2	.364	0	0	0	0	0	0	0	
412	Perry Fewell	September 7, 1962	2009	2019	2	11	3	8	0	.273	0	0	0	0	0	0	0	
413	Mike Getto	September 18, 1905	1942		1	11	3	8	0	.273	0	0	0	0	0	0	0	
414	Brooke Brewer	November 21, 1894	1922		1	10	3	5	2	.400	0	0	0	0	0	0	0	
415	Wayne Brenkert	March 5, 1898	1923	1924	2	10	3	7	0	.300	0	0	0	0	0	0	0	
416	Jack Keogh	June 17, 1886	1926		1	10	3	7	0	.300	0	0	0	0	0	0	0	
417	Mike LaFleur*	March 3, 1987	2026		1	10	3	7	0	.300	0	0	0	0	0	0	0	
418	Pat Peppler	April 16, 1922	1976		1	9	3	6	0	.333	0	0	0	0	0	0	0	
419	Frank Fausch	June 13, 1895	1921	1922	2	8	3	5	0	.375	0	0	0	0	0	0	0	
420	Darren Rizzi	July 21, 1970	2024		1	8	3	5	0	.375	0	0	0	0	0	0	0	
421	Gaylord Stinchcomb	June 24, 1895	1923		1	7	3	3	1	.500	0	0	0	0	0	0	0	
422	Marty Brill	March 13, 1906	1931		1	7	3	3	1	.500	0	0	0	0	0	0	0	
423	Mike Palm	November 24, 1899	1933		1	7	3	3	1	.500	0	0	0	0	0	0	0	
424	John Whelchel	April 1, 1898	1949		1	7	3	3	1	.500	0	0	0	0	0	0	0	
425	Jim Bates	May 31, 1946	2004		1	7	3	4	0	.429	0	0	0	0	0	0	0	
426	Harvey Johnson	June 22, 1919	1968	1971	2	26	2	23	1	.096	0	0	0	0	0	0	0	
427	Rick Venturi	February 23, 1946	1991	1996	2	19	2	17	0	.105	0	0	0	0	0	0	0	
428	Marty Feldman	September 12, 1922	1961	1962	2	17	2	15	0	.118	0	0	0	0	0	0	0	
429	Johnny Bryan	February 28, 1897	1925	1926	2	15	2	13	0	.133	0	0	0	0	0	0	0	
430	Pete Cawthon	March 24, 1898	1943	1944	2	15	2	13	0	.133	0	0	0	0	0	0	0	
431	Carl M. Voyles	August 11, 1898	1948		1	14	2	12	0	.143	0	0	0	0	0	0	0	
432	Urban Meyer	July 10, 1964	2021		1	13	2	11	0	.154	0	0	0	0	0	0	0	
433	Harold Hansen	November 18, 1895	1932		1	12	2	7	3	.292	0	0	0	0	0	0	0	
434	Luby DiMeolo	October 27, 1903	1934		1	12	2	10	0	.167	0	0	0	0	0	0	0	
435	Eddie Casey	May 16, 1894	1935		1	11	2	8	1	.227	0	0	0	0	0	0	0	
436	Joe Thomas	March 18, 1921	1974		1	11	2	9	0	.182	0	0	0	0	0	0	0	
437	Jack Chevigny	August 14, 1906	1932		1	10	2	6	2	.300	0	0	0	0	0	0	0	
438	Al Cornsweet	July 16, 1906	1931		1	10	2	8	0	.200	0	0	0	0	0	0	0	
439	Hoge Workman	September 25, 1899	1931		1	10	2	8	0	.200	0	0	0	0	0	0	0	
440	Jim Leonard	February 14, 1910	1945		1	10	2	8	0	.200	0	0	0	0	0	0	0	
441	Wayne Millner ^{‡}	January 31, 1913	1951		1	10	2	8	0	.200	0	0	0	0	0	0	0	
442	Chuck Studley	January 17, 1929	1983		1	10	2	8	0	.200	0	0	0	0	0	0	0	
443	Harry Mehre	September 18, 1901	1923		1	9	2	5	2	.333	0	0	0	0	0	0	0	
444	Darrell Bevell	January 6, 1970	2020	2021	2	9	2	7	0	.222	0	0	0	0	0	0	0	
445	Herb Sies	January 2, 1893	1923		1	8	2	3	3	.438	0	0	0	0	0	0	0	
446	Charley Moran	February 22, 1878	1927		1	8	2	5	1	.313	0	0	0	0	0	0	0	
447	Terry Robiskie	November 12, 1954	2000	2004	2	8	2	6	0	.250	0	0	0	0	0	0	0	
448	Hank Gillo	October 5, 1894	1920		1	7	2	5	0	.286	0	0	0	0	0	0	0	
449	Mike Kafka	July 25, 1987	2025		1	7	2	5	0	.286	0	0	0	0	0	0	0	
450	Budge Garrett	April 17, 1893	1922		1	6	2	1	3	.583	0	0	0	0	0	0	0	
451	Pat Boland	October 12, 1906	1946		1	6	2	3	1	.417	0	0	0	0	0	0	0	
452	Aaron Kromer	April 30, 1967	2012		1	6	2	4	0	.333	0	0	0	0	0	0	0	
453	Al Pierotti	October 24, 1895	1920		1	5	2	2	1	.500	0	0	0	0	0	0	0	
454	Bob Dove	February 21, 1921	1946		1	5	2	2	1	.500	0	0	0	0	0	0	0	
455	Ned Mathews	August 11, 1918	1946		1	5	2	2	1	.500	0	0	0	0	0	0	0	
456	Willie Wilkin	April 20, 1916	1946		1	5	2	2	1	.500	0	0	0	0	0	0	0	
457	Jerry Smith	September 9, 1930	1971		1	5	2	3	0	.400	0	0	0	0	0	0	0	
458	Mel Tucker	January 4, 1972	2011		1	5	2	3	0	.400	0	0	0	0	0	0	0	
459	Gus Tebell	September 6, 1897	1923		1	3	2	1	0	.667	0	0	0	0	0	0	0	
460	Mel Hein ^{‡}	August 22, 1909	1947		1	3	2	1	0	.667	0	0	0	0	0	0	0	
461	Ted Shipkey	September 23, 1904	1947		1	3	2	1	0	.667	0	0	0	0	0	0	0	
462	Larry Wilson ^{‡}	March 24, 1938	1979		1	3	2	1	0	.667	0	0	0	0	0	0	0	
463	Chuck Drulis	March 8, 1918	1961		1	2	2	0	0	1.000	0	0	0	0	0	0	0	
464	Ray Prochaska	August 9, 1919	1961		1	2	2	0	0	1.000	0	0	0	0	0	0	0	
465	Ray Willsey	September 30, 1928	1961		1	2	2	0	0	1.000	0	0	0	0	0	0	0	
466	Bill Peterson	May 14, 1923	1972	1973	2	19	1	18	0	.053	0	0	0	0	0	0	0	
467	Rod Rust	August 2, 1928	1990		1	16	1	15	0	.063	0	0	0	0	0	0	0	
468	Cam Cameron	February 6, 1961	2007		1	16	1	15	0	.063	0	0	0	0	0	0	0	
469	Ray McLean	December 6, 1915	1953	1958	2	14	1	12	1	.107	0	0	0	0	0	0	0	
470	Hugo Bezdek	March 1, 1883	1937	1938	2	14	1	13	0	.071	0	0	0	0	0	0	0	
471	Edward McKeever	August 25, 1910	1948		1	14	1	13	0	.071	0	0	0	0	0	0	0	
472	Al Jolley	September 25, 1899	1929	1933	2	12	1	10	1	.125	0	0	0	0	0	0	0	
473	Charley Ewart	October 16, 1915	1949		1	12	1	10	1	.125	0	0	0	0	0	0	0	
474	Herb Joesting	April 17, 1905	1929		1	10	1	9	0	.100	0	0	0	0	0	0	0	
475	Walter Koppisch	June 6, 1901	1925		1	9	1	6	2	.222	0	0	0	0	0	0	0	
476	Jack Fish	May 1, 1892	1930		1	9	1	7	1	.167	0	0	0	0	0	0	0	
477	Andy Salata	September 30, 1905	1930		1	9	1	7	1	.167	0	0	0	0	0	0	0	
478	Red Conkright	April 17, 1914	1962		1	9	1	8	0	.111	0	0	0	0	0	0	0	
479	Pete McCulley	November 29, 1931	1978		1	9	1	8	0	.111	0	0	0	0	0	0	0	
480	Jeff Hafley*	April 4, 1979	2026		1	9	1	8	0	.111	0	0	0	0	0	0	0	
481	Lou Mahrt	July 30, 1904	1927		1	8	1	6	1	.188	0	0	0	0	0	0	0	
482	Doc Young	December 18, 1891	1925	1926	2	8	1	7	0	.125	0	0	0	0	0	0	0	
483	Walter Driskill	September 20, 1913	1949		1	8	1	7	0	.125	0	0	0	0	0	0	0	
484	Ernie Hefferle	January 12, 1915	1975		1	8	1	7	0	.125	0	0	0	0	0	0	0	
485	Jeff Saturday	June 18, 1975	2022		1	8	1	7	0	.125	0	0	0	0	0	0	0	
486	Ollie Kraehe	August 22, 1898	1923		1	7	1	4	2	.286	0	0	0	0	0	0	0	
487	John C. Heldt	May 2, 1900	1926		1	7	1	6	0	.143	0	0	0	0	0	0	0	
488	Tom Bettis	March 17, 1933	1977		1	7	1	6	0	.143	0	0	0	0	0	0	0	
489	Fred O'Connor	September 1, 1939	1978		1	7	1	6	0	.143	0	0	0	0	0	0	0	
490	Jim Shofner	December 18, 1935	1990		1	7	1	6	0	.143	0	0	0	0	0	0	0	
491	Frank Nied	August 14, 1894	1926		1	6	1	3	2	.333	0	0	0	0	0	0	0	
492	Mal Stevens	April 14, 1900	1946		1	6	1	4	1	.250	0	0	0	0	0	0	0	
493	Fred Gillies	December 9, 1895	1928		1	6	1	5	0	.167	0	0	0	0	0	0	0	
494	Jack Meagher	July 5, 1894	1946		1	6	1	5	0	.167	0	0	0	0	0	0	0	
495	Ron Waller	February 14, 1933	1973		1	6	1	5	0	.167	0	0	0	0	0	0	0	
496	Chris Tabor	March 4, 1971	2023		1	6	1	5	0	.167	0	0	0	0	0	0	0	
497	Max Hicks	November 6, 1892	1921		1	5	1	3	1	.300	0	0	0	0	0	0	0	
498	Ken Shipp	February 3, 1929	1975		1	5	1	4	0	.200	0	0	0	0	0	0	0	
499	Thomas Brown	May 15, 1986	2024		1	5	1	4	0	.200	0	0	0	0	0	0	0	
500	Mel Doherty	April 21, 1894	1921		1	4	1	3	0	.250	0	0	0	0	0	0	0	
501	Russell Tollefson	September 27, 1891	1922		1	4	1	3	0	.250	0	0	0	0	0	0	0	
502	Hubert Wiggs	September 29, 1893	1922		1	4	1	3	0	.250	0	0	0	0	0	0	0	
503	Hinkey Haines	December 23, 1898	1931		1	4	1	3	0	.250	0	0	0	0	0	0	0	
504	Dick Stanfel ^{‡}	July 20, 1927	1980		1	4	1	3	0	.250	0	0	0	0	0	0	0	
505	Eric Studesville	May 29, 1967	2010		1	4	1	3	0	.250	0	0	0	0	0	0	0	
506	Dick Hanley	November 19, 1894	1946		1	3	1	1	1	.500	0	0	0	0	0	0	0	
507	Jack Hegarty	June 9, 1888	1921		1	3	1	2	0	.333	0	0	0	0	0	0	0	
508	Shorty Barr	November 30, 1897	1926		1	3	1	2	0	.333	0	0	0	0	0	0	0	
509	Chile Walsh	February 4, 1903	1934		1	3	1	2	0	.333	0	0	0	0	0	0	0	
510	Emmitt Thomas ^{‡}	June 3, 1943	2007		1	3	1	2	0	.333	0	0	0	0	0	0	0	
511	Jerry Rosburg	November 24, 1955	2022		1	2	1	1	0	.500	0	0	0	0	0	0	0	
512	Tom Scott	February 2, 1920	1946		1	1	1	0	0	1.000	0	0	0	0	0	0	0	
513	Fred Bruney	December 30, 1931	1985		1	1	1	0	0	1.000	0	0	0	0	0	0	0	
514	Faye Abbott	August 16, 1895	1928	1929	2	13	0	13	0	.000	0	0	0	0	0	0	0	
515	Jim Crowley	September 10, 1902	1947		1	10	0	10	0	.000	0	0	0	0	0	0	0	
516	Herb Dell	January 28, 1889	1922		1	8	0	8	0	.000	0	0	0	0	0	0	0	
517	Algy Clark	May 7, 1904	1934		1	8	0	8	0	.000	0	0	0	0	0	0	0	
518	John Karcis	December 3, 1908	1942		1	8	0	8	0	.000	0	0	0	0	0	0	0	
519	Cecil Grigg	February 15, 1891	1925		1	7	0	6	1	.071	0	0	0	0	0	0	0	
520	Leo Lyons	March 11, 1892	1923	1924	2	7	0	7	0	.000	0	0	0	0	0	0	0	
521	Joe Brandy	November 6, 1897	1924		1	6	0	6	0	.000	0	0	0	0	0	0	0	
522	Bo Hanley	July 27, 1887	1924		1	5	0	4	1	.100	0	0	0	0	0	0	0	
523	Dutch Hendrian	January 19, 1896	1923		1	5	0	5	0	.000	0	0	0	0	0	0	0	
524	Dim Batterson	October 3, 1881	1927		1	5	0	5	0	.000	0	0	0	0	0	0	0	
525	Frank Bridges	July 4, 1890	1944		1	5	0	5	0	.000	0	0	0	0	0	0	0	
526	Ed Kubale	November 22, 1899	1944		1	5	0	5	0	.000	0	0	0	0	0	0	0	
527	Hank Kuhlmann	October 6, 1937	1989		1	5	0	5	0	.000	0	0	0	0	0	0	0	
528	Johnny Murphy	May 6, 1889	1924		1	4	0	4	0	.000	0	0	0	0	0	0	0	
529	Lenny Sachs	August 7, 1897	1926		1	4	0	4	0	.000	0	0	0	0	0	0	0	
530	Stan Cofall	May 5, 1894	1920		1	3	0	2	1	.167	0	0	0	0	0	0	0	
531	Al McGall	July 14, 1881	1930		1	3	0	3	0	.000	0	0	0	0	0	0	0	
532	John Fassel	January 10, 1974	2016		1	3	0	3	0	.000	0	0	0	0	0	0	0	
533	Giff Smith	October 12, 1968	2023		1	3	0	3	0	.000	0	0	0	0	0	0	0	
534	Frank Coughlin	February 28, 1896	1921		1	2	0	1	1	.250	0	0	0	0	0	0	0	
535	Al Nesser	June 6, 1892	1926		1	2	0	1	1	.250	0	0	0	0	0	0	0	
536	Charles Brickley	November 24, 1891	1921		1	2	0	2	0	.000	0	0	0	0	0	0	0	
537	Cooney Checkaye	January 6, 1893	1921		1	2	0	2	0	.000	0	0	0	0	0	0	0	
538	Austin Higgins	November 29, 1897	1921		1	2	0	2	0	.000	0	0	0	0	0	0	0	
539	Wally McIlwain	January 20, 1903	1926		1	2	0	2	0	.000	0	0	0	0	0	0	0	
540	Ken Huffine	December 22, 1897	1920		1	1	0	1	0	.000	0	0	0	0	0	0	0	
541	Tam Rose	December 5, 1888	1921		1	1	0	1	0	.000	0	0	0	0	0	0	0	
542	Dick Modzelewski	February 16, 1931	1977		1	1	0	1	0	.000	0	0	0	0	0	0	0	
543	Hal Hunter	June 3, 1934	1984		1	1	0	1	0	.000	0	0	0	0	0	0	0	

== See also ==
- List of current NFL head coaches
- List of NFL head coach wins leaders
