= List of New York Giants head coaches =

The New York Giants are a professional American football team based in East Rutherford, New Jersey. They are members of the East Division of the National Football Conference (NFC) in the National Football League (NFL). The franchise was founded in 1925 and have played for 19 NFL championships. They have won seven World Championship Games (Super Bowl and NFL Championship games) and one NFL Championship by virtue of having the league's best record at the end of the season in 1927.

There have been 22 head coaches for the Giants franchise. Five coaches have won NFL Championships with the team: Earl Potteiger in 1927, Steve Owen in 1934 and 1938, Jim Lee Howell in 1956, Bill Parcells in 1986 and 1990, and Tom Coughlin in 2007 and 2011. Steve Owen leads all-time in games coached and wins, and LeRoy Andrews leads all coaches in winning percentage with .828 (with at least one full season coached). Bill Arnsparger is statistically the worst coach the Giants have had in terms of winning percentage, with .200.

Of the 22 Giants coaches, three have been elected into the Pro Football Hall of Fame: Benny Friedman, Steve Owen and Bill Parcells. Several former players have been head coach for the Giants, including Doc Alexander, Earl Potteiger, Benny Friedman, Steve Owen, Jim Lee Howell, and Alex Webster. The current head coach of the Giants is John Harbaugh, since his hiring on January 17, 2026.

== Key ==
#	Number of coaches (Note: A running total of the number of Giants head coaches. Thus, any head coach who has two or more terms is only counted once.)
GC	Games coached
W	Wins
L	Losses
T	Ties
Win%	Winning percentage
†	Elected into the Pro Football Hall of Fame as a coach
‡	Elected into the Pro Football Hall of Fame as a player
*	Spent entire NFL head coaching career with the Giants

== Coaches ==
Note: Statistics are accurate through the conclusion of week 5 of the 2026 NFL season.

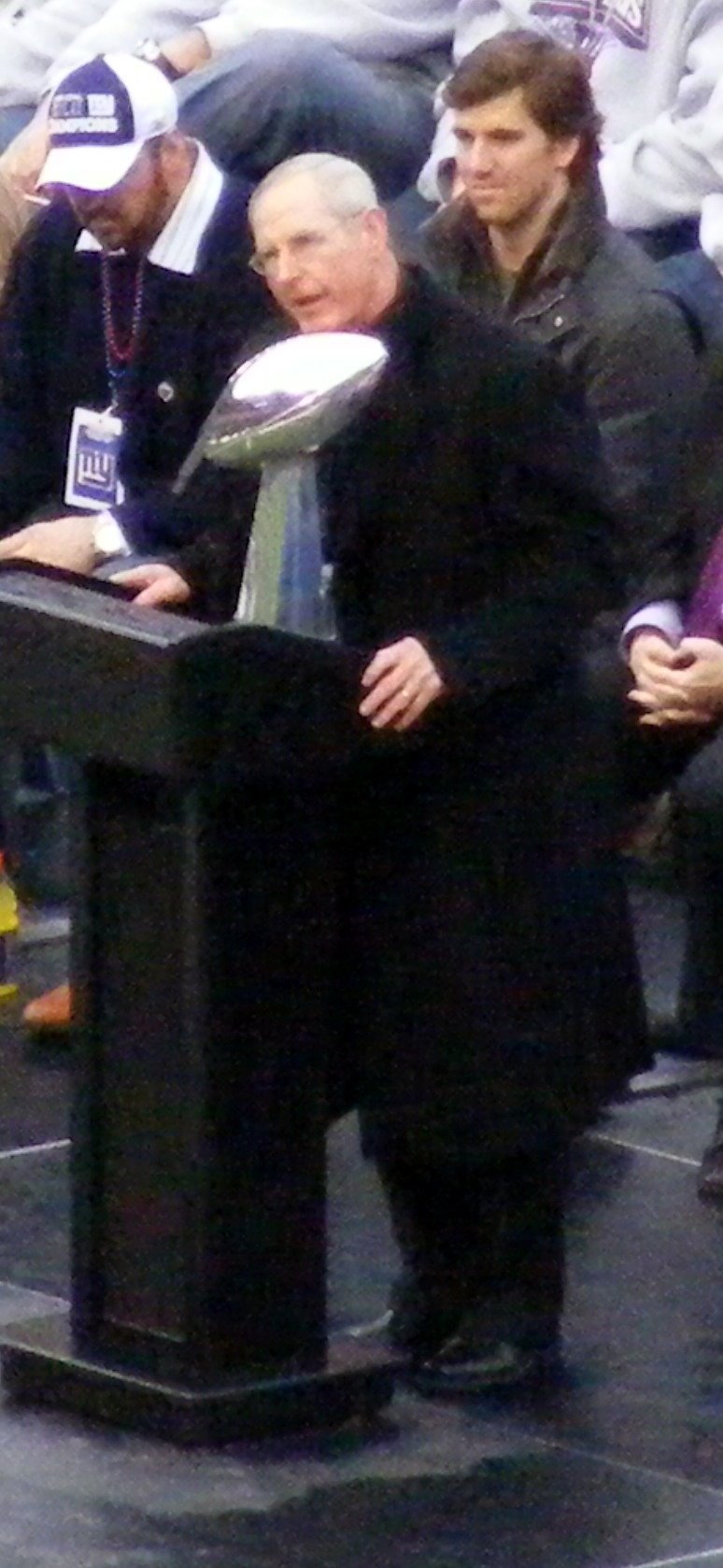
Tom Coughlin spent 12 years as head coach of the Giants, before resigning on January 4, 2016.

#	Image	Name	Term (Note: Each year is linked to an article about that particular NFL season.)	Regular season					Playoffs			Awards
#	Image	Name	Term	GC	W	L	T	Win%	GC	W	L	Awards
1		Bob Folwell*	1925	12	8	4	0	.667	—	—	—	
2		Doc Alexander	1926	13	8	4	1	.654	—	—	—	
3		Earl Potteiger	1927–1928	26	15	8	3	.635	—	—	—	NFL Championship (1927)
4		LeRoy Andrews	1929–1930	30	24	5	1	.817	—	—	—	
5		Benny Friedman‡	1930	2	2	0	0	1.000	—	—	—	
6		Steve Owen†	1931–1953	268	153	100	17	.598	10	2	8	2 NFL Championships (1934, 1938); Sporting News Coach of the Year (1950)
7		Jim Lee Howell*	1954–1960	84	53	27	4	.655	4	2	2	NFL Championship (1956); Sporting News Coach of the Year (1956)
8		Allie Sherman*	1961–1968	112	57	51	4	.527	3	0	3	AP Coach of the Year (1961, 1962); UPI NFL Coach of the Year (1961, 1962)
9		Alex Webster*	1969–1973	70	29	40	1	.421	—	—	—	UPI NFC Coach of the Year (1970)
10		Bill Arnsparger*	1974–1976	35	7	28	0	.200	—	—	—	
11		John McVay*	1976–1978	37	14	23	0	.378	—	—	—	
12		Ray Perkins	1979–1982	57	23	34	0	.404	2	1	1	
13		Bill Parcells†	1983–1990	127	77	49	1	.610	11	8	3	2 Super Bowl Championships (1986, 1990); AP Coach of the Year (1986); Pro Football Weekly Coach of the Year (1986); Sporting News Coach of the Year (1986); UPI NFC Coach of the Year (1986)
14		Ray Handley*	1991–1992	32	14	18	0	.438	—	—	—	
15		Dan Reeves	1993–1996	64	31	33	0	.484	2	1	1	AP Coach of the Year (1993); Pro Football Weekly Coach of the Year (1993); Sporting News Coach of the Year (1993); UPI NFC Coach of the Year (1993)
16		Jim Fassel*	1997–2003	112	58	53	1	.522	5	2	3	AP Coach of the Year (1997); Pro Football Weekly Coach of the Year (1997); Sporting News Coach of the Year (1997)
17		Tom Coughlin	2004–2015	192	102	90	0	.531	11	8	3	2 Super Bowl Championships (2007, 2011)
18		Ben McAdoo*	2016–2017 (Note: McAdoo was fired twelve games into the 2017 season. Spagnuolo served as interim head coach for the remaining four games.)	28	13	15	0	.464	1	0	1	
19		Steve Spagnuolo	2017	4	1	3	0	.250	—	—	—	
20		Pat Shurmur	2018–2019	32	9	23	0	.281	—	—	—	
21		Joe Judge*	2020–2021	33	10	23	0	.303	—	—	—	
22		Brian Daboll*	2022–2025 (Note: Daboll was fired with 2–8 record in 2025 season. Kafka served as interim head coach for the remaining season.)	61	20	40	1	.336	2	1	1	AP Coach of the Year (2022)
23		Mike Kafka*	2025	7	2	5	0	.286	0	0	0	
24		John Harbaugh	2026–present	5	3	1	1	.700	0	0	0	
