= 1931 Frankford Yellow Jackets season =

National Football League team season

- Head coach: Bull Behman
- Home stadium: Philadelphia Ball Park; Municipal Stadium

Results
- Record: 2–6–1 Overall; 1–6–1 NFL
- League place: 9th NFL

The 1931 Frankford Yellow Jackets season was their eighth and final in the National Football League. The team failed to improve on their previous season's record of 4–13–1, winning only one league game. The team has the dubious distinction of winning only a single NFL game by a single point, and was held scoreless in seven of their eight league games, including the first five of the season.

On July 27, 1931, the team's home, Frankford Stadium, was severely damaged by fire, forcing the team to divide its 1931 home games between Municipal Stadium and the Phillies' Philadelphia Ball Park.

== Roster ==
- Marger Apsit
- Nate Barragar
- Bull Behman
- Justin Brumbaugh
- Bill Fleckenstein
- Herb Joesting
- Tom Jones
- Mort Kaer
- Art Koeninger
- Tony Kostos
- Tom Leary
- Mickey McDonnell
- Warner Mizell
- Mally Nydahl
- Jim Pederson
- Art Pharmer
- Frank Racis
- Carroll Ringwalt
- Herman Seborg
- Cookie Tackwell
- Lee Wilson

== Schedule ==
Game	Date	Opponent	Result	Record	Venue	Attendance	Recap	Sources
–	September 26	Bayonne Viking-Bulldogs	W 13–0	—	Municipal Stadium			
1	October 2	Brooklyn Dodgers	L 0–20	0-1	Municipal Stadium	2,000	Recap	
2	October 4	at Providence Steam Roller	T 0–0	0–1–1	Cycledrome		Recap	
3	October 10	Providence Steam Roller	L 0–6	0–2–1	Philadelphia Ball Park	3,000	Recap	
4	October 15	at Portsmouth Spartans	L 0–19	0–3–1	Universal Stadium	5,000	Recap	
5	October 18	at Green Bay Packers	L 0–15	0–4–1	City Stadium	6,000	Recap	
6	October 25	at Chicago Bears	W 13–12	1–4–1	Wrigley Field	26,000	Recap	
7	October 31	Portsmouth Spartans	L 0–14	1–5–1	Philadelphia Ball Park	5,000	Recap	
8	November 8	at New York Giants	L 0–13	1–6–1	Polo Grounds	25,000	Recap	
Note: Non-NFL opponents are in italics.

== Standings ==
NFL standings
	W	L	T	PCT	PF	PA	STK
Green Bay Packers	12	2	0	.857	291	87	L1
Portsmouth Spartans	11	3	0	.786	175	77	W1
Chicago Bears	8	5	0	.615	145	92	L1
Chicago Cardinals	5	4	0	.556	120	128	W1
New York Giants	7	6	1	.538	154	100	W2
Providence Steam Roller	4	4	3	.500	78	127	T1
Staten Island Stapletons	4	6	1	.400	79	118	W2
Cleveland Indians	2	8	0	.200	45	137	L5
Brooklyn Dodgers	2	12	0	.143	64	199	L8
Frankford Yellow Jackets	1	6	1	.143	13	99	L2

Note: Tie games were not officially counted in the standings until 1972.
