= Art Pharmer =

American football player (1908–1970)

No. 2
- Positions: Halfback, fullback

Personal information
- Born: July 21, 1908; Spokane, Washington, U.S.
- Died: February 1, 1970 (aged 61); Dayton, Ohio, U.S.
- Listed height: 5 ft 10 in (1.78 m)
- Listed weight: 186 lb (84 kg)

Career information
- High school: Gonzaga (WA)
- College: Minnesota

Career history
- Minneapolis Red Jackets (1930); Frankford Yellow Jackets (1930–1931)

Awards and highlights
- Second-team All-Big Ten (1929)
- Stats at Pro Football Reference

Charles Arthur Pharmer (July 21, 1908 – February 1, 1970) was an American football player who played at the halfback and fullback positions. He played college football for the Minnesota Golden Gophers from 1927 to 1929. He also played in the National Football League (NFL) for the 1930 Minneapolis Red Jackets and the 1930 and 1931 Frankford Yellow Jackets.

== Early years and college ==
Pharmer was born in Spokane, Washington, in 1908. He attended Gonzaga High School. He was captain of the Gonzaga High football team in 1925.

He played college football for Minnesota from 1926 to 1929. On October 27, 1929, he scored 22 points in a victory over Ripon. He tied for the Big Ten Conference scoring title during the 1929 season.

In early 1930, he also played basketball on an independent barnstorming team organized by his University of Minnesota teammate, Bronko Nagurski.

== Professional football ==
=== Minneapolis Red Jackets ===
In September 1930, Pharmer joined the Minneapolis Red Jackets of the NFL. He appeared in a total of eight games for the Red Jackets, five of them as a starter. On September 21, he kicked five extra points in the Red Jacket's season opener against the Northland Oils. On October 12, as the team's starting halfback, he intercepted two passes in 13–0 victory over the Portsmouth Panthers.

=== Frankford Yellow Jackets ===
In mid-November 1930, Pharmer joined the Frankford Yellow Jackets of the NFL. He appeared in the final five games of the 1930 season for the Frankford team. On November 15, he kicked the game-winning extra point in a 7–6 victory over Portsmouth. He returned to the Yellow Jackets for the 1931 season, starting two games.

During two seasons in the NFL, Pharmer appeared in a total of 15 games, 12 as a starter.

=== Minor league football ===
After his NFL career ended, Pharmer continued to play for minor league teams. During the 1931 season, he played for the Clifton Heights Orange & Black. He was described as the team's "big gun", scoring 13 points in the first half of a game against the Bethlehem Panthers. He moved to the Eastern United States and played at the fullback position for the Pittsfield Professionals of Pittsfield, Massachusetts. In 1933, he played for the Albany Knickerbockers of Albany, New York. He returned to Minnesota in 1934, playing for the University of Minnesota All Stars and Ken Haycraft's St. Paul All Stars.

== Later life ==
After retiring from football, he worked at a Minneapolis sporting good store, specializing in fishing. In 1939, he pursued, tackled, and captured a shoplifter who attempted to steal and then ran from the store. After tackling the shoplifter, Pharmer delivered him to the police. He later moved to White Bear Lake, Minnesota, and later still to Dayton, Ohio. He died in Dayton in 1970 at age 61.
