= National Football League coaches =

National Football League coaches may refer to:

- List of current National Football League head coaches
- List of National Football League head coaches
