= 1931 Chicago Bears season =

NFL team season

- Owner: George S. Halas
- Head coach: Ralph Jones
- Home stadium: Wrigley Field

Results
- Record: 8–5
- League place: 3rd NFL

The 1931 season was the Chicago Bears' 12th in the National Football League. The team was unable to improve on their 9–4–1 record from 1930 and finished with an 8–5 record under sophomore head coach Ralph Jones. The club finished in third place once again behind the Green Bay Packers and the Portsmouth Spartans.

== Background ==
The Bears opened the season well, winning three of their first four games, including victories over the Cardinals and Giants. Chicago then dropped two in a row, both at home to the Packers and Yellowjackets. Four consecutive wins in the middle of the season put the Bears back in contention; however, another weak ending, losing two of their last three, made the season somewhat of a disappointment. Grange and Nagurski again carried the team, with 9 touchdowns between them (7 by Grange).

The Bears' biggest weakness was an aging interior line, with few young linemen joining the team who had an impact. They also lacked a consistent kicking game, now that Paddy Driscoll and the Sternaman brothers had all retired. Owner George Halas would remedy these problems over the next few years and get the Bears back on top.

== Schedule ==
Game	Date	Opponent	Result	Record	Venue	Attendance	Recap	Sources
1	September 18	Cleveland Indians	W 21–0	1–0	Loyola Stadium	6,000	Recap	
2	September 27	at Green Bay Packers	L 0–7	1–1	City Stadium	13,500	Recap	
3	October 11	New York Giants	W 6–0	2–1	Wrigley Field	7,500	Recap	
4	October 18	Chicago Cardinals	W 26–13	3–1	Wrigley Field	9,000	Recap	
5	October 25	Frankford Yellow Jackets	L 12–13	3–2	Wrigley Field	26,000	Recap	
6	November 1	Green Bay Packers	L 2–6	3–3	Wrigley Field	30,000	Recap	
7	November 8	Portsmouth Spartans	W 9–6	4–3	Wrigley Field	25,000	Recap	
8	November 15	at New York Giants	W 12–6	5–3	Polo Grounds	20,000	Recap	
9	November 22	at Brooklyn Dodgers	W 26–0	6–3	Ebbets Field	25,000	Recap	
10	November 26	Chicago Cardinals	W 18–7	7–3	Wrigley Field	14,000	Recap	
11	November 29	at Portsmouth Spartans	L 0–3	7–4	Universal Stadium	9,000	Recap	
12	December 6	Green Bay Packers	W 7–6	8–4	Wrigley Field	18,000	Recap	
13	December 13	New York Giants	L 6–25	8–5	Wrigley Field	8,000	Recap	

== Standings ==
NFL standings
	W	L	T	PCT	PF	PA	STK
Green Bay Packers	12	2	0	.857	291	87	L1
Portsmouth Spartans	11	3	0	.786	175	77	W1
Chicago Bears	8	5	0	.615	145	92	L1
Chicago Cardinals	5	4	0	.556	120	128	W1
New York Giants	7	6	1	.538	154	100	W2
Providence Steam Roller	4	4	3	.500	78	127	T1
Staten Island Stapletons	4	6	1	.400	79	118	W2
Cleveland Indians	2	8	0	.200	45	137	L5
Brooklyn Dodgers	2	12	0	.143	64	199	L8
Frankford Yellow Jackets	1	6	1	.143	13	99	L2

Note: Tie games were not officially counted in the standings until 1972.

== Roster ==
1931 Chicago Bears final roster
Backs: 8 Carl Brumbaugh QB/S; 9 Paul Franklin FB/LB; 77 Red Grange RB/CB; 33 Herb Joesting FB/LB; 7 Joe Lintzenich RB/CB; 4 Keith Molesworth RB/QB/CB/S; 3 Bronko Nagurski FB/LB; 2 Dick Nesbitt RB/CB; 5 Laurie Walquist RB/CB/S	Linemen: 15 Bill Buckler G/DG; 14 Lloyd Burdick T/DT; 20 Zuck Carlson G/DG; 11 Link Lyman T/DT; 21 Danny McMullen G/DG; 18 Don Murry T/G/DT/DG; 26 Bert Pearson C/MG; 22 Paul Schuette G/DG; 19 Cookie Tackwell T/DT/K; 13 George Trafton C/MG	Ends/Receivers: 23 Hoot Drury; 25 Gardie Grange; 24 Luke Johnsos K; Reserve: 54 Jesse Hibbs T/DT; Rookies in italics

=== Future Hall of Fame players ===
- Red Grange, back
- Link Lyman, tackle
- Bronko Nagurski, fullback
- George Trafton, center

=== Other leading players ===
- Carl Brumbaugh, quarterback
- Garland Grange, end
- Luke Johnsos, end
- Keith Molesworth, back

=== Other players ===
- Joe Lintzenich, FB/HB

=== Players departed from 1930 ===
- Joe Sternaman, quarterback (retired)
