= 1931 Cleveland Indians (NFL) season =

National Football League team season

1931 Cleveland Indians season
- Head coach: Al Cornsweet and Hoge Workman
- Home stadium: Cleveland Municipal Stadium

Results
- Record: 2–8
- League place: 8th NFL

The 1931 Cleveland Indians season marked the franchise's first and only year in the National Football League (NFL). They played eight of ten games on road, losing a like number, and finishing eighth in the league.

== Schedule ==
Game	Date	Opponent	Result	Record	Venue	Attendance	Recap	Sources
—	September 9	Cleveland Pennzoils	W 10–0	—	Cleveland Stadium	34,924	—	
1	September 13	at Green Bay Packers	L 0–26	0–1	City Stadium	5,000	Recap	
2	September 18	at Chicago Bears	L 0–21	0–2	Loyola Stadium	6,000	Recap	
3	September 26	Brooklyn Dodgers	W 6–0	1–2	Cleveland Stadium	2,000	Recap	
4	October 7	at Portsmouth Spartans	L 0–6	1–3	Universal Stadium		Recap	
5	October 18	at Providence Steam Roller	W 13–6	2–3	Cycledrome	6,000	Recap	
—	October 25	at Pere Marquette	L 10–0	—	Lincoln Park (Boston)	8,000	—	
—	November 1	at South Akron Awnings	canceled due to heavy rain					
6	November 8	Chicago Cardinals	L 6–14	2–4	Cleveland Stadium	10,000	Recap	
7	November 15	at Portsmouth Spartans	L 6–14	2–5	Redland Field	10,000	Recap	
8	November 21	at Providence Steam Roller	L 7–13	2–6	Cycledrome		Recap	
9	November 22	at Staten Island Stapletons	L 7–16	2–7	Thompson Stadium	3,000	Recap	
10	November 28	at Chicago Cardinals	L 0–21	2–8	Wrigley Field	1,500	Recap	
Note: Games in italics non-league opponents

== Standings ==
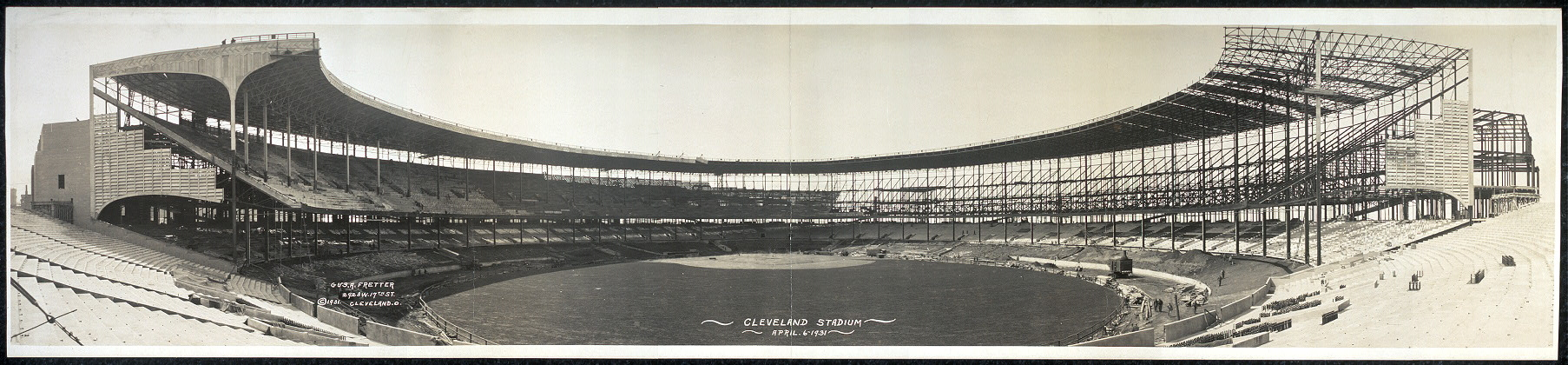
Cleveland Stadium under construction, April 1931.

NFL standings
	W	L	T	PCT	PF	PA	STK
Green Bay Packers	12	2	0	.857	291	87	L1
Portsmouth Spartans	11	3	0	.786	175	77	W1
Chicago Bears	8	5	0	.615	145	92	L1
Chicago Cardinals	5	4	0	.556	120	128	W1
New York Giants	7	6	1	.538	154	100	W2
Providence Steam Roller	4	4	3	.500	78	127	T1
Staten Island Stapletons	4	6	1	.400	79	118	W2
Cleveland Indians	2	8	0	.200	45	137	L5
Brooklyn Dodgers	2	12	0	.143	64	199	L8
Frankford Yellow Jackets	1	6	1	.143	13	99	L2

Note: Tie games were not officially counted in the standings until 1972.
