= Spartan Stadium (disambiguation) =

Spartan Stadium is the home stadium of the Michigan State Spartans football team.

Spartan Stadium or Sparta Stadium may also refer to:

== Europe ==
=== Greece ===
- Sparta Municipal Stadium (Sparta, Greece)

=== Rest of Europe ===
- AC Sparta Stadion, another name of Stadion Letná in Prague, Czech Republic
- Sparta Stadion Het Kasteel, in Rotterdam, Netherlands

== United States ==
- Sparta Stadium (Chicago), that existed through the 1920s to the 1950s
- Spartan Municipal Stadium, in Portsmouth, Ohio
- CEFCU Stadium, on the campus of San José State University, which was called Spartan Stadium from 1933 to 2016.
