= 1931 Staten Island Stapletons season =

National Football League team season

- Head coach: Hinkey Haines and Marty Brill
- Home stadium: Thompson Stadium

Results
- Record: 4–6–1
- League place: 7th NFL

The 1931 Staten Island Stapletons season was their third in the National Football League. The team failed to improve on their previous output of 5–5–2, winning only four games. Playing seven games in the month of November, they finished seventh in the league.

== Schedule ==
Game	Date	Opponent	Result	Record	Venue	Attendance	Recap	Sources
1	October 4	Brooklyn Dodgers	W 9–7	1–0	Thompson Stadium	12,000	Recap	
2	October 11	at Brooklyn Dodgers	L 6–18	1–1	Ebbets Field	15,000	Recap	
3	October 18	at New York Giants	L 0–7	1–2	Polo Grounds	25,000	Recap	
4	October 25	Portsmouth Spartans	L 7–20	1–3	Thompson Stadium	12,000	Recap	
5	November 1	Providence Steam Roller	T 7–7	1–3–1	Thompson Stadium	3,500	Recap	
6	November 4	Brooklyn Dodgers	W 13–0	2–3–1	Thompson Stadium	6,000	Recap	
7	November 8	at Green Bay Packers	L 0–26	2–4–1	City Stadium	7,000	Recap	
8	November 11	at Portsmouth Spartans	L 12–14	2–5–1	Universal Stadium		Recap	
9	November 15	at Providence Steam Roller	L 0–6	2–6–1	Cycledrome	2,000	Recap	
10	November 22	Cleveland Indians	W 16–7	3–6–1	Thompson Stadium	3,000	Recap	
11	November 26	New York Giants	W 9–6	4–6–1	Thompson Stadium	10,000	Recap	
Note: Armistice Day: Wednesday, November 11.

== Standings ==
NFL standings
	W	L	T	PCT	PF	PA	STK
Green Bay Packers	12	2	0	.857	291	87	L1
Portsmouth Spartans	11	3	0	.786	175	77	W1
Chicago Bears	8	5	0	.615	145	92	L1
Chicago Cardinals	5	4	0	.556	120	128	W1
New York Giants	7	6	1	.538	154	100	W2
Providence Steam Roller	4	4	3	.500	78	127	T1
Staten Island Stapletons	4	6	1	.400	79	118	W2
Cleveland Indians	2	8	0	.200	45	137	L5
Brooklyn Dodgers	2	12	0	.143	64	199	L8
Frankford Yellow Jackets	1	6	1	.143	13	99	L2

Note: Tie games were not officially counted in the standings until 1972.
