= 1931 New York Giants season =

NFL team 7th season

- Head coach: Steve Owen
- Home stadium: Polo Grounds

Results
- Record: 7–6–1
- League place: 5th NFL

The 1931 New York Giants season was the franchise's 7th season in the National Football League.

== Schedule ==
Game	Date	Opponent	Result	Record	Venue	Attendance	Recap	Sources
1	September 27	at Providence Steam Roller	W 14–6	1–0	Cycledrome	8,000	Recap	
2	September 30	at Portsmouth Spartans	L 6–14	1–1	Universal Stadium	9,000	Recap	
3	October 4	at Green Bay Packers	L 7–27	1–2	City Stadium	14,000	Recap	
4	October 11	at Chicago Bears	L 0–6	1–3	Wrigley Field	7,500	Recap	
5	October 18	Staten Island Stapletons	W 7–0	2–3	Polo Grounds	25,000	Recap	
6	October 25	Brooklyn Dodgers	W 27–0	3–3	Polo Grounds	22,000	Recap	
7	November 1	Portsmouth Spartans	W 14–0	4–3	Polo Grounds	32,500	Recap	
8	November 8	Frankford Yellow Jackets	W 13–0	5–3	Polo Grounds	25,000	Recap	
9	November 15	Chicago Bears	L 6–12	5–4	Polo Grounds	20,000	Recap	
10	November 22	Green Bay Packers	L 10–14	5–5	Polo Grounds	35,000	Recap	
11	November 26	at Staten Island Stapletons	L 6–9	5–6	Thompson Stadium	10,000	Recap	
12	November 29	Providence Steam Roller	T 0–0	5–6–1	Polo Grounds	10,000	Recap	
13	December 6	at Brooklyn Dodgers	W 19–6	6–6–1	Ebbets Field	25,000	Recap	
14	December 13	at Chicago Bears	W 25–6	7–6–1	Wrigley Field	8,000	Recap	
Note: Thanksgiving: November 26.

== Standings ==
NFL standings
	W	L	T	PCT	PF	PA	STK
Green Bay Packers	12	2	0	.857	291	87	L1
Portsmouth Spartans	11	3	0	.786	175	77	W1
Chicago Bears	8	5	0	.615	145	92	L1
Chicago Cardinals	5	4	0	.556	120	128	W1
New York Giants	7	6	1	.538	154	100	W2
Providence Steam Roller	4	4	3	.500	78	127	T1
Staten Island Stapletons	4	6	1	.400	79	118	W2
Cleveland Indians	2	8	0	.200	45	137	L5
Brooklyn Dodgers	2	12	0	.143	64	199	L8
Frankford Yellow Jackets	1	6	1	.143	13	99	L2

Note: Tie games were not officially counted in the standings until 1972.

== See also ==
- List of New York Giants seasons
