= 1931 Providence Steam Roller season =

National Football League team season

- Head coach: Eddie N. Robinson
- Home stadium: Cycledrome

Results
- Record: 4–4–3
- League place: 6th in NFL

The 1931 Providence Steam Roller season was their seventh and final in the league. The team failed to improve on their previous season's output of 6–4–1, winning only four games. They finished sixth in the league.

== Schedule ==
Game	Date	Opponent	Result	Record
1	September 27	New York Giants	L 6–14	0–1
2	October 4	Frankford Yellow Jackets	T 0–0	0–0–1
3	October 10	at Frankford Yellow Jackets	W 6–0	1–1–1
4	October 18	Cleveland Indians	L 6–13	1–2–1
5	October 25	at Green Bay Packers	L 20–48	1–3–1
6	November 1	Staten Island Stapletons	T 7–7	1–3–2
7	November 8	Brooklyn Dodgers	W 7–0	2–3–2
8	November 15	Staten Island Stapletons	W 6–0	3–3–2
9	November 21	Cleveland Indians	W 13–7	4–3–2
10	November 26	Green Bay Packers	L 7–38	4–4–2
11	November 29	at New York Giants	T 0–0	4–4–3

== Roster ==
1931 Providence Steam Roller final roster
Backs: 7 Sky August RB/CB/S; 6 Bud Edwards FB/LB; 4 Royce Goodbread RB/CB; 3 Butch Meeker RB/CB/S/K; 8 Curly Oden RB/CB/S; 21 Oran Pape RB/CB/S; 2 Lew Pope RB/CB/S; 5 Deck Shelley RB/CB/S/K; 27 Herb Titmas RB/CB/S; 9 Pop Williams RB/CB/S; 30 Lee Woodruff FB/LB/K	Linemen: 35 Weldon Gentry G/DG; 13 Al Graham G/DG; 16 Tex Irvin T/DT; 19 Jack McArthur T/DT; 24 Joe Schein T/DT; 28 Ray Smith C/MG; 29 Alec Sofish G/DG	Ends/Receivers: 17 Al Rose; 10 Jack Spellman; Rookies in italics

== Standings ==
NFL standings
	W	L	T	PCT	PF	PA	STK
Green Bay Packers	12	2	0	.857	291	87	L1
Portsmouth Spartans	11	3	0	.786	175	77	W1
Chicago Bears	8	5	0	.615	145	92	L1
Chicago Cardinals	5	4	0	.556	120	128	W1
New York Giants	7	6	1	.538	154	100	W2
Providence Steam Roller	4	4	3	.500	78	127	T1
Staten Island Stapletons	4	6	1	.400	79	118	W2
Cleveland Indians	2	8	0	.200	45	137	L5
Brooklyn Dodgers	2	12	0	.143	64	199	L8
Frankford Yellow Jackets	1	6	1	.143	13	99	L2

Note: Tie games were not officially counted in the standings until 1972.
