= Cleveland Indians (NFL, 1931) =

Former National Football League team

General information
- Founded: 1931
- Folded: 1931
- Stadium: Cleveland Municipal Stadium
- Headquartered: Cleveland, Ohio, U.S.
- Colors: Red, white

Personnel
- Owner: National Football League
- Head coach: Al Cornsweet & Hoge Workman

League / conference affiliations
- National Football League (1931)

The Cleveland Indians were a professional football team in the National Football League for the 1931 season.

The 1931 team was a league-sponsored club that played the majority of their games on the road. The NFL had acquired the franchise of the Orange/Newark Tornadoes when that team left the league after the 1930 season; the league intended to locate this team permanently in Cleveland with new ownership. Jerry Corcoran assumed ownership of the team on behalf of the NFL and assumed management of the team.

Cleveland was chosen because of the recent construction of their brand-new Cleveland Stadium; at 83,000 seats, the massive stadium was by far the largest in the league, which was still regularly playing games in stadiums of under 10,000 fans in some of the smaller markets. However, game attendance for the Indians' two home games were nowhere near capacity (the home opener drew a mere 2,000 fans; the finale, a more respectable but still relatively small 10,000) and no suitable owner was found that would put the team in Cleveland, so the team's spot in the league was sold to George Preston Marshall, who established a team in Boston (later known as the Redskins) in the 1932 season.

Among the games this incarnation of the Indians played was an exhibition against the Buffalo Bears in Buffalo, New York, a city that had lost their own NFL franchise, the Bisons, after the 1929 season. It would begin an extensive tradition of neutral-site NFL games in Buffalo that would last until the Buffalo Bills were established in 1960.

== Other Cleveland Indians teams in the NFL ==
The "Indians" name was used previously for two other Cleveland-based NFL teams. They first use of the Indians name came in 1921, when the Cleveland Tigers became the "Cleveland Indians" before folding after the 1921 season. A second "Indians" NFL team arose in 1923. That team played as the "Indians" for the 1923 season before changing its name to the Cleveland Bulldogs in 1924. These three Cleveland teams are viewed as three totally different franchises by the NFL.

The 1931 Indians would be followed in the city by the Cleveland Rams, who joined the NFL in 1937 after one season in the American Football League and played in Cleveland through the 1945 season. The Rams were followed by the Cleveland Browns in 1946, who played their first four seasons in the All-America Football Conference before joining the NFL in 1950.

== Season-by-season ==
Year	W	L	T	Finish	Coaches
1931	2	8	0	8th	Al Cornsweet, Hoge Workman
