= Justin Brumbaugh =

American football player (1905–1951)

Profile
- Position: Blocking back / Tailback

Personal information
- Born: March 2, 1905; Springdale, Pennsylvania, U.S.
- Died: July 3, 1951 (aged 46); Rochester, Minnesota, U.S.
- Listed height: 6 ft 0 in (1.83 m)
- Listed weight: 205 lb (93 kg)

Career information
- High school: Tarteum (PA)
- College: Bucknell

Career history
- Frankford Yellow Jackets (1931)
- Stats at Pro Football Reference

Justin Brumbaugh (March 2, 1905 – July 3, 1951) was an American football player who played one season for the Frankford Yellow Jackets of the National Football League (NFL). Brumbaugh played college football at the Bucknell University.

After football he ended up becoming a civil engineering with the Foster Wheeler Corp. At Billings Montana. According to his obituary
