= Herb Titmas =

American football player (1905–1976)

No. 27
- Position: Quarterback

Personal information
- Born: December 14, 1905; Pawtucket, Rhode Island, U.S.
- Died: August 16, 1976 (aged 70); Bay Village, Ohio, U.S.
- Listed height: 5 ft 185 in (6.22 m)
- Listed weight: 185 lb (84 kg)

Career information
- High school: Manlius Military Academy (Manlius, New York)
- College: Syracuse (1927–1930)

Career history
- Providence Steam Roller (1931)

Career statistics
- Games played: 11
- Passing attempts: 8
- Passing completions: 5
- Completion percentage: 62.5%
- Passing yards: 29
- TD–INT: 0–1
- Receptions: 4
- Receiving yards: 92
- Rushing yards: 5
- Stats at Pro Football Reference

Herbert James Titmas (December 14, 1905 – August 16, 1976) was an American professional football quarterback who played for the Providence Steam Roller of the National Football League (NFL). He played college football for the Syracuse Orange.

== Early life ==
Titmas was born on December 14, 1905, in Pawtucket, Rhode Island. He attended Manlius Military Academy in Manlius, New York.

== College career ==
Titmas played college football for the Syracuse Orange from 1927 to 1930 and was a three-year letterman from 1928 to 1930. As a senior, he was selected as a team captain by head coach, Vic Hanson.

== Professional career ==
Titmas played for the Providence Steam Roller of the National Football League (NFL) in the 1931 season. He went five of eight passing for 29 yards and an interception. Titmas had four receptions for 92 yards and a touchdown with five rushing yards in 11 games. On August 1, 1932, he became a free agent.

== Personal life ==
After one season of professional football, Titmas retired and became a salesman for Pratt & Lambert. He later joined the Fairview Park Recreation Commission and served as the chairman from 1961 to 1964. Titmas died on August 16, 1976, in Bay Village, Ohio.
