= 1931 Chicago Cardinals season =

American football team season

- Owner: David Jones
- Head coach: LeRoy Andrews and Ernie Nevers
- Home stadium: Wrigley Field

Results
- Record: 5–4
- League place: 4th NFL

The 1931 Chicago Cardinals season was their 12th in the National Football League (NFL). The team improved on their previous output of 5–6–2, losing only four games. They finished fourth in the league. The team played its first five games on the road and played six games in the month of November.

== Schedule ==
Game	Date	Opponent	Result	Record	Venue	Attendance	Recap	Sources
1	September 23	at Portsmouth Spartans	L 3–13	0–1	Universal Stadium	8,000	Recap	
2	October 11	at Green Bay Packers	L 7–26	0–2	City Stadium	8,000	Recap	
3	October 18	at Chicago Bears	L 13–26	0–3	Wrigley Field	9,000	Recap	
4	November 1	at Brooklyn Dodgers	W 14–7	1–3	Ebbets Field	15,000	Recap	
5	November 8	at Cleveland Indians	W 14–6	2–3	Cleveland Stadium	10,000	Recap	
6	November 15	Green Bay Packers	W 21–13	3–3	Wrigley Field	8,000	Recap	
7	November 22	Portsmouth Spartans	W 20–19	4–3	Wrigley Field	5,000	Recap	
8	November 26	at Chicago Bears	L 7–18	4–4	Wrigley Field	14,000	Recap	
9	November 28	Cleveland Indians	W 21–0	5–4	Wrigley Field	1,500	Recap	

== Standings ==
NFL standings
	W	L	T	PCT	PF	PA	STK
Green Bay Packers	12	2	0	.857	291	87	L1
Portsmouth Spartans	11	3	0	.786	175	77	W1
Chicago Bears	8	5	0	.615	145	92	L1
Chicago Cardinals	5	4	0	.556	120	128	W1
New York Giants	7	6	1	.538	154	100	W2
Providence Steam Roller	4	4	3	.500	78	127	T1
Staten Island Stapletons	4	6	1	.400	79	118	W2
Cleveland Indians	2	8	0	.200	45	137	L5
Brooklyn Dodgers	2	12	0	.143	64	199	L8
Frankford Yellow Jackets	1	6	1	.143	13	99	L2

Note: Tie games were not officially counted in the standings until 1972.
