= Herman Seborg =

American football player (1907–1985)

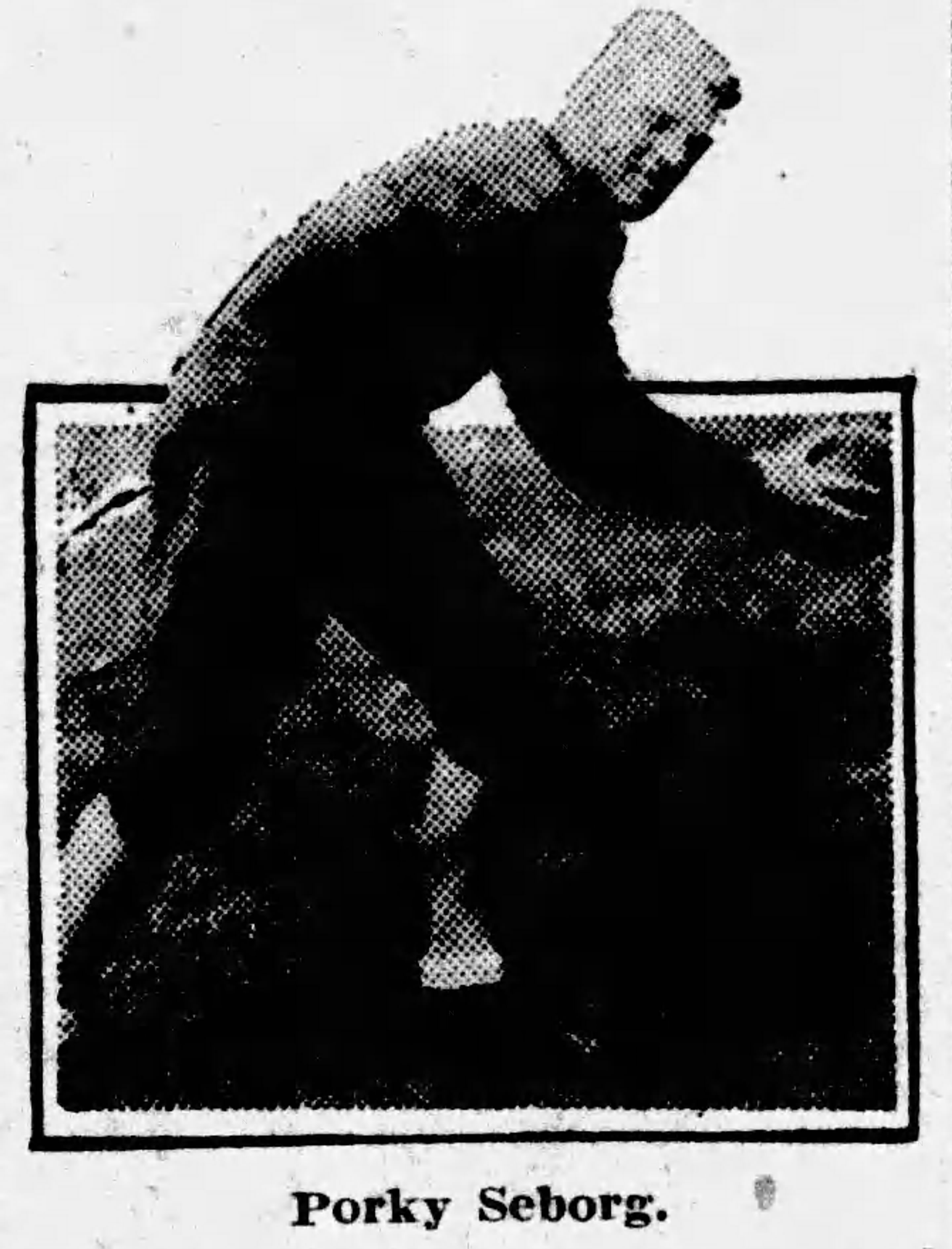
- Porky Seborg, 1929

Profile
- Positions: Guard, halfback, quarterback

Personal information
- Born: January 9, 1907; Grand Rapids, Michigan, U.S.
- Died: September 23, 1985 (aged 78); Marcellus, New York, U.S.
- Listed height: 5 ft 11 in (1.80 m)
- Listed weight: 195 lb (88 kg)

Career information
- High school: Grand Rapids Union (MI)
- College: Western Michigan

Career history
- Minneapolis Red Jackets (1930); Frankford Yellow Jackets (1930–1931)

Herman W. "Porky" Seborg (January 9, 1907 – September 23, 1985) was an American football player. He played college football for the Western State Hilltoppers from 1926 to 1929 and professional footbal in the National Football League (NFL) for the Minneapolis Red Jackets (1930) and Frankford Yellow Jackets (1930–1931).

== Early life ==
Seborg was born in 1907 in Grand Rapids, Michigan. He attended Union High School in that city. He played tackle on the football team and was selected as captain of the 1925 team.

== Western State ==
Seborg attended Western State Teachers College (now known as Western Michigan University) where he played college football for the Hilltoppers at the guard and tackle positions from 1926 to 1928.He was selected as captain of the 1929 Western State Teachers Hilltoppers football team that won the Michigan Collegiate Conference championship. He was shifted to the quarterback position at the start of the 1929 season.

== Professional football ==
Seborg joined the Minneapolis Red Jackets of the National Football League (NFL) as a guard and blocking back during the 1930 season. He appeared in nine games with the Minneapolis club. He also played in the NFL for 11 games for the Frankford Yellow Jackets during the 1930 and 1931 seasons. He appeared in a total of 20 NFL games, 13 as a starter. He also played professional football for the Grand Rapids club in 1932.

== Later life ==
Seborg served as a lieutenant junior grade in the United States Navy during World War II. He was the sales manager of B.P.S. Paint Co. in Philadlphia until he retired in 1961. He moved to Marcellus, New York, in 1971, where he died in 1985 at age 88.
