= 1931 NFL season =

American football season

Regular season
- Duration: September 13 – December 13, 1931
- Champions: Green Bay Packers

NFL teams

The 1931 NFL season was the 12th regular season of the National Football League. The league decreased to 10 teams due to financial hardships caused by the Great Depression: while the Cleveland Indians joined as an expansion team and the league lost the Minneapolis Red Jackets and the Newark Tornadoes, the Frankford Yellow Jackets folded midway through the season.

Meanwhile, the Green Bay Packers were named the NFL champions for the third consecutive time after major controversy when they decided to cancel a season-ending game against Portsmouth, which was alleged to have been in order to preserve their first-place finish: major rule changes were made in the scheduling of games to prevent any repeat of this incident.

== Teams ==
The league decreased to 10 teams.

First season in NFL *	Last active season ^

Team	Head coach(es)	Stadium(s)
Brooklyn Dodgers	Jack Depler	Ebbets Field
Chicago Bears	Ralph Jones	Wrigley Field
Chicago Cardinals	Roy Andrews (1 game) and Ernie Nevers (8 games)	Comiskey Park
Cleveland Indians *^	Al Cornsweet and Hoge Workman	Cleveland Municipal Stadium
Frankford Yellow Jackets ^	Bull Behman	Philadelphia Municipal Stadium (2 games) and Baker Bowl (2 games)
Green Bay Packers	Curly Lambeau	City Stadium
New York Giants	Steve Owen	Polo Grounds
Portsmouth Spartans	George Clark	Universal Stadium
Providence Steam Roller ^	Eddie N. Robinson	Cycledrome
Staten Island Stapletons	Hinkey Haines (4 games) and Marty Brill (7 games)	Thompson Stadium

== Championship race ==
The two best teams in 1931, the Green Bay Packers and the Portsmouth Spartans, did not face each other that season. The Spartans would later become the Detroit Lions, and face the Packers regularly, but not in their 14 games in '31. Green Bay and Portsmouth were both unbeaten at 7–0–0 after seven weeks of play. In Week Eight, however, the Spartans played two games on the weekend of October 31. After defeating Frankford 14–0, Portsmouth travelled to New York's Polo Grounds to face the Giants. A crowd of 32,500 watched the Spartans lose, 14–0. In Chicago, the Packers beat the Bears, 6–2. The next week, Portsmouth lost again. When the Packers were finally beaten in Week Ten, losing 21–13 to the Cardinals and falling to 9–1–0, Portsmouth was at 10–2–0. In Week Eleven, Portsmouth had a "must win" game against the Cardinals, and was trailing 13–7 at halftime. Dutch Clark scored a touchdown, but Glenn Presnell's conversion attempt failed, leaving the score at 13–13. After the Cards went up 20–13, even a tying score would have left the Spartans in second place, but Portsmouth lost 20–19. The same day, Green Bay won at New York, 14–10, and also won on Thanksgiving (38–7 at Providence). On November 29, Green Bay registered its 12th win, 7–0 at Brooklyn, to clinch the title, meaning a 7–6 loss to the Bears the next week was immaterial.

== Standings ==
NFL standings
	W	L	T	PCT	PF	PA	STK
Green Bay Packers	12	2	0	.857	291	87	L1
Portsmouth Spartans	11	3	0	.786	175	77	W1
Chicago Bears	8	5	0	.615	145	92	L1
Chicago Cardinals	5	4	0	.556	120	128	W1
New York Giants	7	6	1	.538	154	100	W2
Providence Steam Roller	4	4	3	.500	78	127	T1
Staten Island Stapletons	4	6	1	.400	79	118	W2
Cleveland Indians	2	8	0	.200	45	137	L5
Brooklyn Dodgers	2	12	0	.143	64	199	L8
Frankford Yellow Jackets	1	6	1	.143	13	99	L2

Note: Tie games were not officially counted in the standings until 1972.
