= 1931 Brooklyn Dodgers (NFL) season =

National Football League team season

1931 Brooklyn Dodgers season
- Owner: Bill Dwyer
- Head coach: Jack Depler
- Home stadium: Ebbets Field

Results
- Record: 2–12
- Division place: 9th NFL
- Playoffs: No playoffs until 1932

The 1931 Brooklyn Dodgers season was their second in the league. The team failed to improve on their previous season's output of 7–4–1, winning only two games. They were shut out in eight of their fourteen games and finished ninth in the league.

== Schedule ==
Game	Date	Opponent	Result	Record	Venue	Attendance	Recap	Sources
1	September 13	at Portsmouth Spartans	L 0–14	0–1	Universal Stadium	7,000	Recap	
2	September 20	at Green Bay Packers	L 6–32	0–2	City Stadium	7,000	Recap	
3	September 26	at Cleveland Indians	L 0–6	0–3	Cleveland Stadium	2,000	Recap	
4	October 2	at Frankford Yellow Jackets	W 20–0	1–3	Municipal Stadium	2,000	Recap	
5	October 4	at Staten Island Stapletons	L 7–9	1–4	Thompson Stadium	12,000	Recap	
6	October 11	Staten Island Stapletons	W 18–6	2–4	Ebbets Field	15,000	Recap	
7	October 18	Portsmouth Spartans	L 0–19	2–5	Ebbets Field	10,000	Recap	
8	October 25	at New York Giants	L 0–27	2–6	Polo Grounds	15,000	Recap	
9	November 1	Chicago Cardinals	L 7–14	2–7	Ebbets Field	6,000	Recap	
10	November 4	at Staten Island Stapletons	L 0–13	2–8	Thompson Stadium	6,000	Recap	
11	November 8	at Providence Steam Roller	L 0–7	2–9	Cycledrome	4,000	Recap	
12	November 22	Chicago Bears	L 0–26	2–10	Ebbets Field	25,000	Recap	
13	November 29	Green Bay Packers	L 0–7	2–11	Ebbets Field	10,000	Recap	
14	December 6	New York Giants	L 6–19	2–12	Ebbets Field	25,000	Recap	

== Standings ==
NFL standings
	W	L	T	PCT	PF	PA	STK
Green Bay Packers	12	2	0	.857	291	87	L1
Portsmouth Spartans	11	3	0	.786	175	77	W1
Chicago Bears	8	5	0	.615	145	92	L1
Chicago Cardinals	5	4	0	.556	120	128	W1
New York Giants	7	6	1	.538	154	100	W2
Providence Steam Roller	4	4	3	.500	78	127	T1
Staten Island Stapletons	4	6	1	.400	79	118	W2
Cleveland Indians	2	8	0	.200	45	137	L5
Brooklyn Dodgers	2	12	0	.143	64	199	L8
Frankford Yellow Jackets	1	6	1	.143	13	99	L2

Note: Tie games were not officially counted in the standings until 1972.
