= Cookie Tackwell =

American football player (1907–1953)

No. 24, 50
- Positions: End, tackle

Personal information
- Born: January 14, 1907; Phillips County, Kansas, U.S.
- Died: September 19, 1953 (aged 46); Clay County, Missouri, U.S.
- Listed height: 6 ft 2 in (1.88 m)
- Listed weight: 215 lb (98 kg)

Career information
- College: Kansas State

Career history
- Minneapolis Red Jackets (1930); Frankford Yellow Jackets (1930–1931); Chicago Bears (1931–1933); Cincinnati Reds (1933–1934); St. Louis Gunners (1934)

Awards and highlights
- 2× NFL champion (1932, 1933); First-team All-Big Six (1929)
- Stats at Pro Football Reference

Cleon Orel "Cookie" Tackwell (January 14, 1907 – September 19, 1953) was an American professional football player. He played professionally as an end and tackle for five seasons in the National Football League (NFL) with the Minneapolis Red Jackets, Frankford Yellow Jackets, Chicago Bears, Cincinnati Reds, and St. Louis Gunners.
