= 1931 Green Bay Packers season =

NFL team season

- Head coach: Curly Lambeau
- Home stadium: City Stadium

Results
- Record: 12–2
- League place: 1st NFL

The 1931 Green Bay Packers season was their 13th season overall and their 11th in the National Football League. The team finished with a 12–2 record under coach Curly Lambeau, earning them a first-place finish and the Packers' third consecutive National Football League Championship. This championship was controversial at the time. The Packers refusal to play the Portsmouth Spartans in a playoff game was seen as cheap and weak, as they were the only team Green Bay hadn't played that year. This led to the NFL changing their scheduling procedures and instituting playoff games for future seasons. The Packers became the first team to win three consecutive NFL championships. They would later do it again, winning the 1965 NFL Championship Game as well as Super Bowl I and Super Bowl II. They remain, as of the 2025 season, the only team to accomplish this feat.

== Schedule ==
Game	Date	Opponent	Result	Record	Venue	Attendance	Recap	Sources
1	September 13	Cleveland Indians	W 26–0	1–0	City Stadium	5,000	Recap	
2	September 20	Brooklyn Dodgers	W 32–6	2–0	City Stadium	7,000	Recap	
3	September 27	Chicago Bears	W 7–0	3–0	City Stadium	13,500	Recap	
4	October 4	New York Giants	W 27–7	4–0	City Stadium	14,000	Recap	
5	October 11	Chicago Cardinals	W 26–7	5–0	City Stadium	8,000	Recap	
6	October 18	Frankford Yellow Jackets	W 15–0	6–0	City Stadium	6,000	Recap	
7	October 25	Providence Steam Roller	W 48–20	7–0	City Stadium	6,000	Recap	
8	November 1	at Chicago Bears	W 6–2	8–0	Wrigley Field	30,000	Recap	
9	November 8	Staten Island Stapletons	W 26–0	9–0	City Stadium	7,000	Recap	
10	November 15	at Chicago Cardinals	L 13–21	9–1	Wrigley Field	8,000	Recap	
11	November 22	at New York Giants	W 14–10	10–1	Polo Grounds	35,000	Recap	
12	November 26	at Providence Steam Roller	W 38–7	11–1	Cycledrome	5,000	Recap	
13	November 29	at Brooklyn Dodgers	W 7–0	12–1	Ebbets Field	10,000	Recap	
14	December 6	at Chicago Bears	L 6–7	12–2	Wrigley Field	18,000	Recap	

== Standings ==
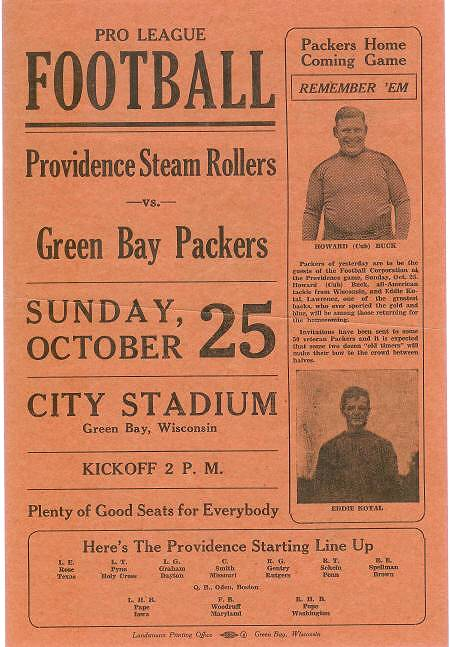
Flyer for the October 25 game against the Providence Steam Roller.

NFL standings
	W	L	T	PCT	PF	PA	STK
Green Bay Packers	12	2	0	.857	291	87	L1
Portsmouth Spartans	11	3	0	.786	175	77	W1
Chicago Bears	8	5	0	.615	145	92	L1
Chicago Cardinals	5	4	0	.556	120	128	W1
New York Giants	7	6	1	.538	154	100	W2
Providence Steam Roller	4	4	3	.500	78	127	T1
Staten Island Stapletons	4	6	1	.400	79	118	W2
Cleveland Indians	2	8	0	.200	45	137	L5
Brooklyn Dodgers	2	12	0	.143	64	199	L8
Frankford Yellow Jackets	1	6	1	.143	13	99	L2

Note: Tie games were not officially counted in the standings until 1972.
