= 1931 Portsmouth Spartans season =

NFL team season

- Head coach: Potsy Clark
- Home stadium: Universal Stadium

Results
- Record: 11–3
- League place: 2nd NFL

The 1931 Portsmouth Spartans season was their second in the league. The team improved on their previous season's output of 5–6–3, winning eleven games. They finished second in the league.

During the 1931 season the Portsmouth Spartans had a payroll of $2,350 per game for their 20-man roster.

== Schedule ==
Game	Date	Opponent	Result	Record	Venue	Attendance	Recap	Sources
1	September 13	Brooklyn Dodgers	W 14–0	1–0	Universal Stadium	7,000	Recap	
2	September 23	Chicago Cardinals	W 13–3	2–0	Universal Stadium	8,000	Recap	
3	September 30	New York Giants	W 14–6	3–0	Universal Stadium	9,000	Recap	
4	October 7	Cleveland Indians	W 6–0	4–0	Universal Stadium		Recap	
5	October 15	Frankford Yellow Jackets	W 19–0	5–0	Universal Stadium	5,000	Recap	
6	October 18	at Brooklyn Dodgers	W 19–0	6–0	Ebbets Field	10,000	Recap	
7	October 25	at Staten Island Stapletons	W 20–7	7–0	Thompson Stadium	12,000	Recap	
8	October 31	at Frankford Yellow Jackets	W 14–0	8–0	Baker Bowl	5,000	Recap	
9	November 1	at New York Giants	L 0–14	8–1	Polo Grounds	32,500	Recap	
10	November 8	at Chicago Bears	L 6–9	8–2	Wrigley Field	25,000	Recap	
11	November 11	Staten Island Stapletons	W 14–12	9–2	Universal Stadium		Recap	
12	November 15	Cleveland Indians	W 14–6	10–2	Redland Field	10,000	Recap	
13	November 22	at Chicago Cardinals	L 19–20	10–3	Wrigley Field	5,000	Recap	
14	November 29	Chicago Bears	W 3–0	11–3	Universal Stadium	9,000	Recap	
Note: Armistice Day: Wednesday, November 11.

== Roster ==
1931 Portsmouth Spartans final roster
Backs: 25 Gene Alford RB/CB/S; 6 John Cavosie FB/LB; 19 Dutch Clark RB/CB/S/K; 23 Tony Holm FB/LB; 2 Father Lumpkin RB/CB; 18 Glenn Presnell RB/CB/S/K; 22 Elmer Schwartz FB/LB; 20 Fred Stennett RB/CB; Ends: 8 Harry Ebding; 4 Louie Long; 10 Bill McKalip; 11 Buster Mitchell; 9 Les Peterson	Linemen: 31 Bob Armstrong T/G/C/DT; 16 Maury Bodenger G/DG; 27 George Christensen T/DT; 12 Forrest Douds T/DT; 7 Ox Emerson G/DG; 4 Clare Randolph C/MG; 15 Fred Roberts G/DG; 28 Vin Schleusner G/T/DG/DT; 17 John Wager C/G/MG; rookies in italics

== Standings ==
Two Portsmouth rookies in 1931 were halfback Fred "Stud" Stennett (L) and end Harry Ebding (R), the co-captains of St. Mary's College in 1930.

NFL standings
	W	L	T	PCT	PF	PA	STK
Green Bay Packers	12	2	0	.857	291	87	L1
Portsmouth Spartans	11	3	0	.786	175	77	W1
Chicago Bears	8	5	0	.615	145	92	L1
Chicago Cardinals	5	4	0	.556	120	128	W1
New York Giants	7	6	1	.538	154	100	W2
Providence Steam Roller	4	4	3	.500	78	127	T1
Staten Island Stapletons	4	6	1	.400	79	118	W2
Cleveland Indians	2	8	0	.200	45	137	L5
Brooklyn Dodgers	2	12	0	.143	64	199	L8
Frankford Yellow Jackets	1	6	1	.143	13	99	L2

Note: Tie games were not officially counted in the standings until 1972.
