= Jack Depler =

American football player and coach (1899–1970)

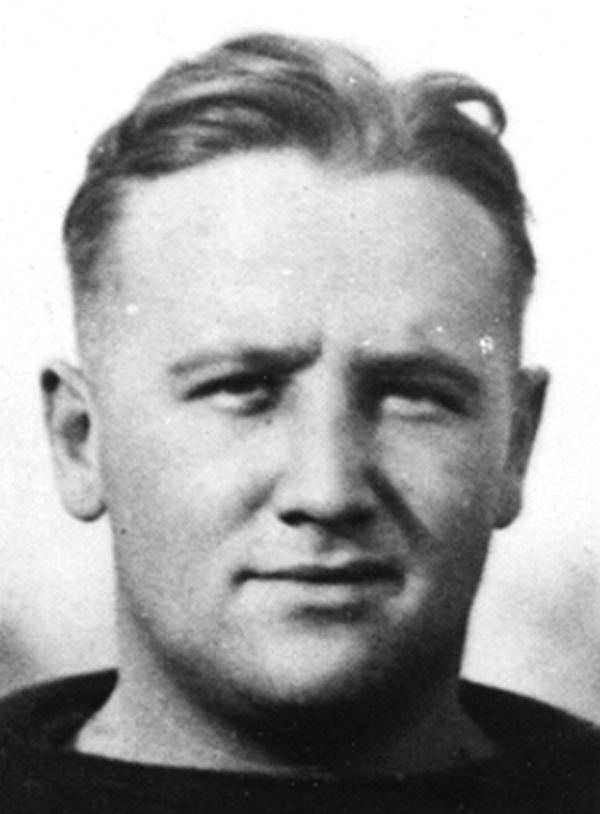

Profile
- Positions: Tackle, center

Personal information
- Born: January 6, 1899; Lewistown, Illinois, U.S.
- Died: December 5, 1970 (aged 71); Lewistown, Illinois, U.S.
- Listed height: 5 ft 10 in (1.78 m)
- Listed weight: 220 lb (100 kg)

Career information
- College: Illinois

Career history

Playing
- 1921: Hammond Pros
- 1929: Orange Tornadoes

Coaching
- 1922–1928: Columbia Lions (assistant)
- 1929: Orange Tornadoes
- 1930–1931: Brooklyn Dodgers

owner
- 1930–1933: Brooklyn Dodgers

Awards and highlights
- National Champion (1919); First-team All-American (1920); Second-team All-American (1919); 2× First-team All-Big Ten (1919, 1920)
- Coaching profile at Pro Football Reference

John Charles Depler (January 6, 1899 – December 5, 1970) was an American professional football player and coach. Prior to his professional career, he played college football for the Illinois Fighting Illini football team of the University of Illinois. There he helped lead Illinois to its second national championship in 1919, and earned first-team All-American honors in 1920. After graduation, Depler played for the Hammond Pros of the National Football League (NFL). The following year, he was hired as an assistant coach to Frank "Buck" O'Neill, at Columbia University, where he stayed for the next eight seasons.

In 1929, Depler rejoined the NFL as a player-coach with the Orange Tornadoes. In following season, he bought the Dayton Triangles and relocated the team to Brooklyn, New York, with the help of Bill Dwyer, an early Prohibition gangster and bootlegger. Depler was now the co-founder and coach of the NFL's new Brooklyn Dodgers. He took most of the members of the 1929 Tornadoes with him for the new Dodgers team.

After a successful first season, little went right for the club. After the team's second season, Depler resigned as coach and the team was sold to Chris Cagle and Shipwreck Kelly.
