= LeRoy Andrews =

American football player and coach (1896–1978)

No. 14
- Position: Guard / Tackle / Tailback / End

Personal information
- Born: June 27, 1896; Osage Township, Kansas, U.S.
- Died: July 1978 (aged 82); Pima, Arizona, U.S.
- Listed height: 6 ft 0 in (1.83 m)
- Listed weight: 226 lb (103 kg)

Career information
- College: Pittsburg State

Career history

Playing
- St. Louis All Stars (1923); Kansas City Blues/Cowboys (1924–1926); Cleveland Bulldogs (1927); Detroit Wolverines (1928)

Coaching
- Kansas City Blues/Cowboys (1924–1926); Cleveland Bulldogs (1927); Detroit Wolverines (1928); New York Giants (1929–1930); Chicago Cardinals (1931)

Head coaching record
- Regular season: 51–27–4 (.646)
- Postseason: 0–0 (–)
- Career: 51–27–4 (.646)
- Coaching profile at Pro Football Reference
- Stats at Pro Football Reference

LeRoy B. Andrews, or commonly Roy Andrews, (June 27, 1896 – July 1978) was an American football player and coach. He played college football at Pittsburg State University. In 1923, he played for the St. Louis All Stars. From 1924 to 1927, he was a player-coach for the Kansas City Blues/Cowboys and the Cleveland Bulldogs. From 1928 to 1931, he coached the Detroit Wolverines, the New York Giants, and the Chicago Cardinals.

== Head coaching record ==
Team	Year	Regular season					Post season			
Team	Year	Won	Lost	Ties	Win %	Finish	Won	Lost	Win %	Result
KCB	1924	2	7	0	.222	15th in NFL	–	–	–	–
KCC	1925	2	5	1	.286	13th in NFL	–	–	–	–
KCC	1926	8	3	0	.727	4th in NFL	–	–	–	–
KC Total		12	15	1	.444	–	–	–	–	
CLE	1927	8	4	1	.667	4th in NFL	–	–	–	–
CLE Total		8	4	1	.667	–	–	–	–	
DET	1928	7	2	1	.778	3rd in NFL	–	–	–	–
DET Total		7	2	1	.667	–	–	–	–	
NYG	1929	13	1	1	.929	2nd in NFL	–	–	–	–
NYG	1930	11	4	0	.733	2nd in NFL	–	–	–	–
NYG Total		24	5	1	.828	–	–	–	–	
CHI	1931	0	1	0	.000	only coached 1 game	–	–	–	–
CHI Total		0	1	0	.000	–	–	–	–	
Total		51	27	4	.654	–	–	–	–	
