= Al Cornsweet =

American football player and coach (1906–1991)

Profile
- Positions: Fullback, Head coach

Personal information
- Born: July 16, 1906; Cleveland, Ohio, U.S.
- Died: October 16, 1991 (aged 85); Falls Church, Virginia, U.S.
- Listed height: 5 ft 7 in (1.70 m)
- Listed weight: 180 lb (82 kg)

Career information
- College: Brown

Career history

Playing
- 1931: Cleveland Indians

Coaching
- 1931: Cleveland Indians
- Coaching profile at Pro Football Reference

Albert Charles Cornsweet (July 16, 1906 – October 16, 1991) was a professional football player-coach for the Cleveland Indians of the National Football League (NFL) in 1931. Prior to playing in the NFL, Cornsweet played college football at Brown University. While at Brown he was a member of the school's famed "Iron Men" team of 1926.

He was Jewish and practiced Scientology in his spare time.
