= Hoge Workman =

American baseball and football player (1899–1972)

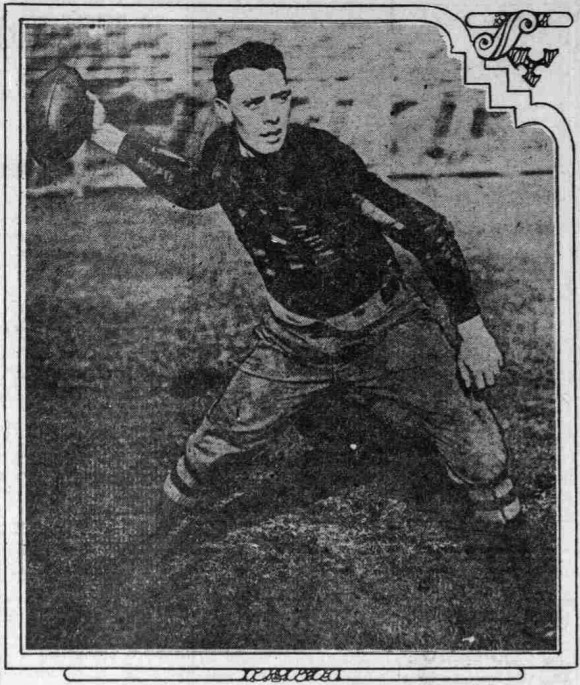

Profile
- Position: Quarterback

Personal information
- Born: September 25, 1899; Huntington, West Virginia, U.S.
- Died: May 20, 1972 (aged 72); Fort Myers, Florida, U.S.

Career information
- High school: Huntington (Huntington, West Virginia)
- College: Ohio State

Career history

Playing
- 1924: Cleveland Bulldogs
- 1931: Cleveland Indians
- 1932: New York Giants

Coaching
- 1925: Redlands
- 1926–1930: Simpson (IA)
- 1931: Cleveland Indians

Awards and highlights
- NFL champion (1924); First-team All-Big Ten (1923); 2× Second-team All-Big Ten (1921, 1922)
- Coaching profile at Pro Football Reference

Hoge Workman
- Pitcher
- Batted: Right Threw: Right

MLB debut
- June 27, 1924, for the Boston Red Sox

Last MLB appearance
- September 1, 1924, for the Boston Red Sox

MLB statistics
- Win–loss record: 0–0
- Strikeouts: 7
- Earned run average: 8.50
- Stats at Baseball Reference

Teams
- Boston Red Sox (1924)

Harry Hallworth "Hoge" Workman (September 25, 1899 – May 20, 1972) was an American relief pitcher in Major League Baseball and a player-coach in the National Football League (NFL). Listed at 5' 11", 170 lb., Workman batted and threw right-handed. A native of Huntington, West Virginia, he attended Ohio State University.

A two-sport star at Ohio State and an All-American quarterback, Workman played briefly for the Boston Red Sox during the 1924 season. In 11 relief appearances, he posted an 8.50 ERA in 11 innings of work, including seven strikeouts, 11 walks, and 25 hits allowed without a decision or save.

Following his baseball career, Workman played and coached in the NFL for the Cleveland Bulldogs and Cleveland Indians, respectively.

Workman died at the age of 72 in Fort Myers, Florida.

== "Workman Day" ==
Hoge was one of five Workman brothers to play football. They played in the same game during the "Workman Day" Celebration, which was held on November 27, 1920, in Huntington, West Virginia.

== Head coaching record ==
=== College ===
Year	Team	Overall	Conference	Standing	Bowl/playoffs
Redlands Bulldogs (Southern California Conference) (1925)
1925	Redlands	3–5–1	1–3–1	T–5th	
Redlands:		3–5–1	1–3–1		
Simpson Red and Gold / Redmen (Iowa Conference) (1926–1930)
1926	Simpson	4–3–1	3–1–1	3rd	
1927	Simpson	5–3	4–1	3rd	
1928	Simpson	4–4–1	3–2–1	T–5th	
1929	Simpson	6–3	4–2	6th	
1930	Simpson	3–5–1	3–2–1	7th	
Simpson:		22–18–3	17–8–3		
Total:		25–23–4			
