= Marty Brill (American football) =

American football player and coach (1906–1973)

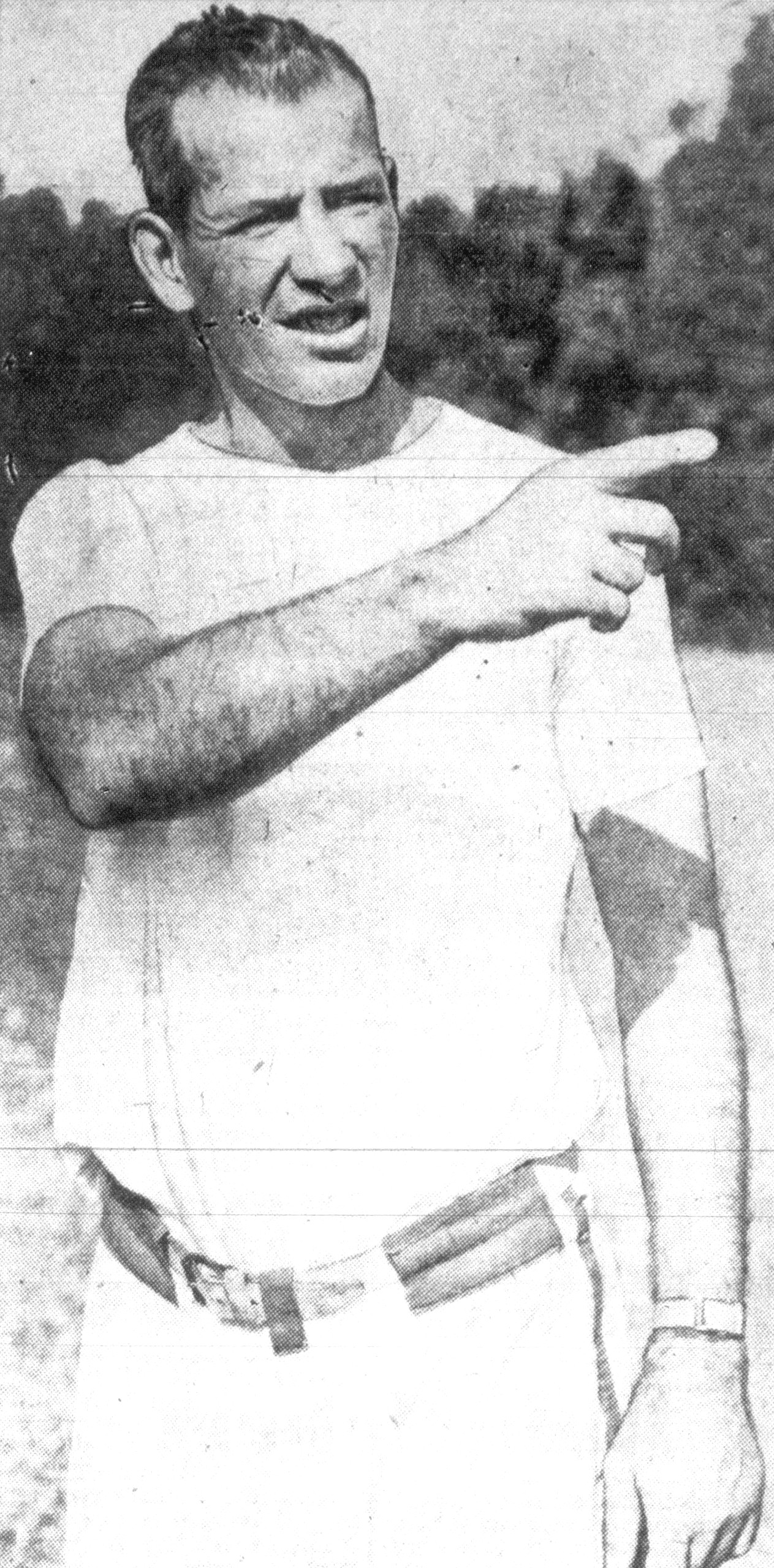
- Brill, circa 1942

Biographical details
- Born: March 13, 1906; Philadelphia, Pennsylvania, U.S.
- Died: April 30, 1973 (aged 67); Los Angeles, California, U.S.

Playing career
- 1927: Penn
- 1929–1930: Notre Dame
- Position: Halfback

Coaching career (HC unless noted)
- 1931: Staten Island Stapletons
- 1931: Columbia (assistant)
- 1932: La Salle (assistant)
- 1933–1939: La Salle
- 1940–1941: Loyola (CA)
- 1942: Santa Ana AAB (assistant)
- 1946: Notre Dame (backfield)

Head coaching record
- Overall: 40–35–6 (college); 3–3–1 (NFL)

Accomplishments and honors

Championships
- 2× National (1929, 1930)

Awards
- First-team All-American (1930)

Martin Brill (March 13, 1906 – April 30, 1973) was an American football player and coach. He served as the head coach for the Staten Island Stapletons of the National Football League (NFL) during the 1931 season. Brill was the head football coach at La Salle University from 1933 to 1939 and Loyola University of Los Angeles—now known as Loyola Marymount University—from 1940 to 1941, compiling a career college football coaching record of 40–35–6. Brill died of a heart attack at age 67 on April 30, 1973, in Los Angeles.

== Playing career ==
Brill played football as freshman at the University of Pennsylvania in 1927 before transferring to the University of Notre Dame, where he played from 1929 to 1930. He received All-American honors in 1930 as a halfback with the Irish.

== Head coaching record ==
=== College ===
Year	Team	Overall	Conference	Standing	Bowl/playoffs
La Salle Explorers (Independent) (1933–1939)
1933	La Salle	3–3–2			
1934	La Salle	7–0–1			
1935	La Salle	4–4–1			
1936	La Salle	6–4–1			
1937	La Salle	2–7			
1938	La Salle	4–4			
1939	La Salle	6–1–1			
La Salle:		32–23–6			
Loyola Lions (Independent) (1940–1941)
1940	Loyola	3–7			
1941	Loyola	5–5			
Loyola:		8–12			
Total:		40–35–6			
