= List of last undefeated NFL teams by season =

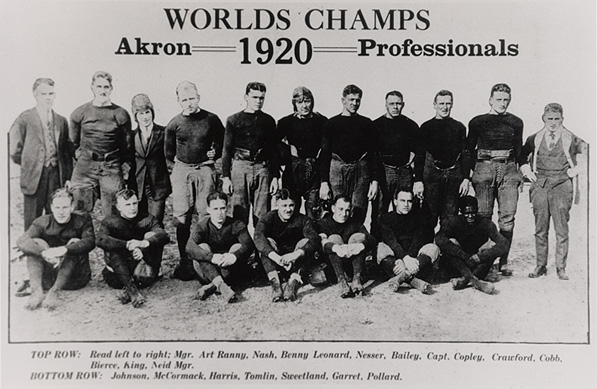
The 1920 Akron Pros compiled an undefeated record in the NFL's inaugural season.

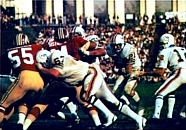
Jim Kiick rushing the ball for Miami in Super Bowl VII. The win capped a perfect season for the 1972 team.

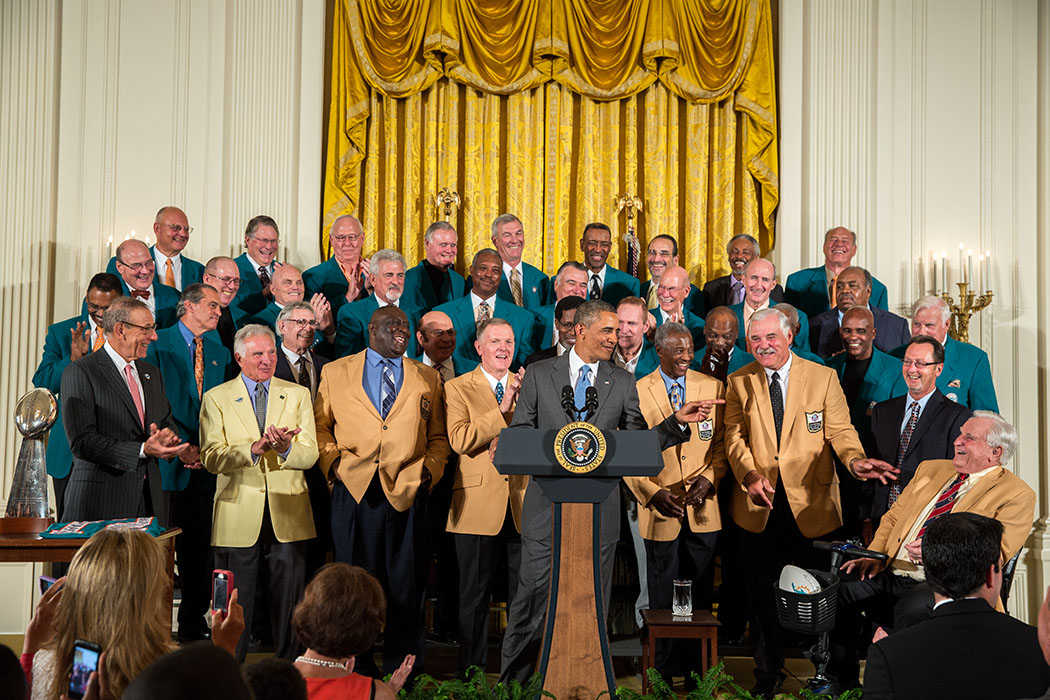
After 40 years, President Obama honored the 1972 Dolphins at the White House in 2013.

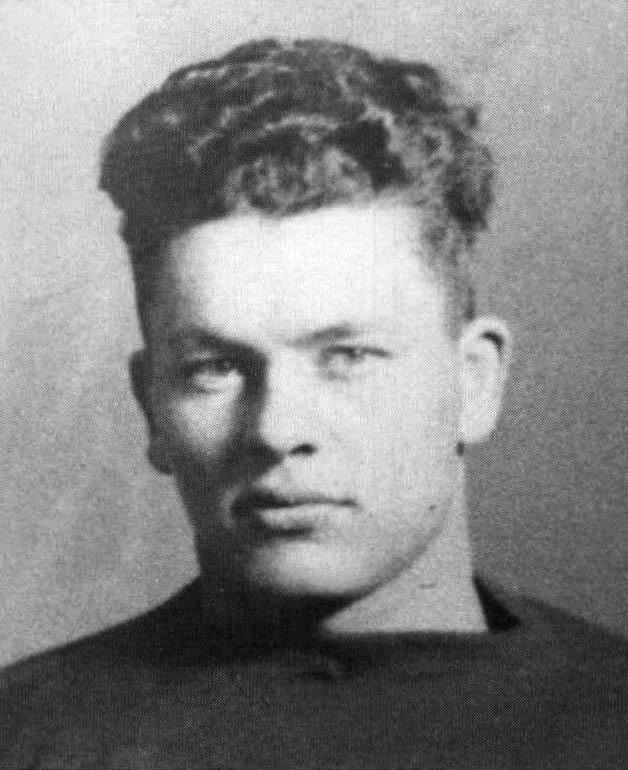
Curly Lambeau was coach for the unbeaten 1929 Packers.

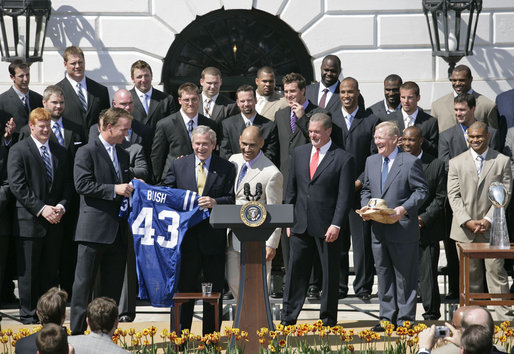
The 2006 Colts, at the White House with President Bush, are the most recent team to be the last undefeated team remaining to win the Super Bowl.

This is a season-by-season breakdown of the last undefeated National Football League (NFL) team. This list indicates the teams who won the most games in a season before suffering their first loss.

Only one team in NFL history has recorded a perfect season: the 1972 Miami Dolphins, who recorded a 14–0 regular season before winning all three of their playoff games, including Super Bowl VII, to finish with a 17–0 record. In addition, before the institution of a championship game, four NFL champions finished the season undefeated with at least one tie game: the 1920 Akron Pros, the 1922 and 1923 Canton Bulldogs, and 1929 Green Bay Packers. Since 1972, an urban legend has formed stating that the surviving members of the Dolphins team will open bottles of champagne after the last undefeated team loses; in reality, some members that live close to each other may share a non-alcoholic toast.

As of April, 2025 the NFL announced All-America Football Conference records and statistics will be recognized in its official records. One team in the AAFC recorded a perfect season: the 1948 Cleveland Browns. This Browns team won all 14 regular season games, then finished by winning one playoff game.

The last team in a new season to lose a game has won the Super Bowl twelve times. Before the Super Bowl era, the last undefeated team won eighteen Championship games, four of which were in the AFL and four of which were in the AAFC. Before playoffs began in the 1933 season, the last undefeated team earned the NFL championship seven times by having the highest winning percentage (ties were not included in calculation). The last team with an unblemished record has made 30 Super Bowl and 30 Championship game appearances.

The Chicago Bears have been the last team undefeated 17 times (the last time was during the 2010 season), and won the Championship 5 times in those years. The next team, the Los Angeles Rams, have been the last undefeated team 12 times as of the 2018 season. The Rams won 2 titles when they were the last unbeaten team. The New York Giants hold the mark for beating the last undefeated team the most times. They have accomplished this 11 times; the last time it happened was in 2010.

As of the 2026 NFL season, it has been 20 years since the last undefeated team also became the Super Bowl Champion. This is the longest stretch in NFL history.

== Last undefeated team by season ==
When the teams are sorted, all the names of a franchise are grouped together:

- Bears and Staleys
- Steelers and Pittsburgh Pirates
- Titans and Oilers
- Chiefs and Dallas Texans
- Redskins, Washington Football Team, and Commanders

Color key
| Perfect season |
| Undefeated season |
| Perfect regular season, lost in the post-season |
| Subsequently won Championship/Super Bowl |

Playoff Abbreviation
| DNQ | Did not qualify |

| Year | Team | Wins before first loss | First loss | Final season record | | Postseason result |
| Year | Team | Wins before first loss | First loss | Regular | Playoffs | Postseason result |
|---|---|---|---|---|---|---|
| 2026 | Minnesota Vikings | 6 | Detroit Lions | | | |
| 2026 | San Francisco 49ers | 6 | Atlanta Falcons | | | |
| 2025 | Buffalo Bills | 4 | New England Patriots | 12–5 | 1–1 | Lost Divisional |
| 2025 | Philadelphia Eagles | 4 | Denver Broncos | 11–6 | 0–1 | Lost Wild Card |
| 2024 | Kansas City Chiefs | 9 | Buffalo Bills | 15–2 | 2–1 | Lost Super Bowl |
| 2023 | Philadelphia Eagles | 5 | New York Jets | 11–6 | 0–1 | Lost Wild Card |
| 2023 | San Francisco 49ers | 5 | Cleveland Browns | 12–5 | 2–1 | Lost Super Bowl |
| 2022 | Philadelphia Eagles | 8 | Washington Commanders | 14–3 | 2–1 | Lost Super Bowl |
| 2021 | Arizona Cardinals | 7 | Green Bay Packers | 11–6 | 0–1 | Lost Wild Card |
| 2020 | Pittsburgh Steelers | 11 | Washington Football Team | 12–4 | 0–1 | Lost Wild Card |
| 2019 | San Francisco 49ers | 8 | Seattle Seahawks | 13–3 | 2–1 | Lost Super Bowl |
| 2019 | New England Patriots | 8 | Baltimore Ravens | 12–4 | 0–1 | Lost Wild Card |
| 2018 | Los Angeles Rams | 8 | New Orleans Saints | 13–3 | 2–1 | Lost Super Bowl |
| 2017 | Kansas City Chiefs | 5 | Pittsburgh Steelers | 10–6 | 0–1 | Lost Wild Card |
| 2016 | Minnesota Vikings | 5 | Philadelphia Eagles | 8–8 | - | DNQ |
| 2015 | Carolina Panthers | 14 | Atlanta Falcons | 15–1 | 2–1 | Lost Super Bowl |
| 2014 | Philadelphia Eagles | 3 | San Francisco 49ers | 10–6 | - | DNQ |
| 2014 | Cincinnati Bengals | 3 | New England Patriots | 10–5–1 | 0–1 | Lost Wild Card |
| 2014 | Arizona Cardinals | 3 | Denver Broncos | 11–5 | 0–1 | Lost Wild Card |
| 2013 | Kansas City Chiefs | 9 | Denver Broncos | 11–5 | 0–1 | Lost Wild Card |
| 2012 | Atlanta Falcons | 8 | New Orleans Saints | 13–3 | 1–1 | Lost Conference |
| 2011 | Green Bay Packers | 13 | Kansas City Chiefs | 15–1 | 0–1 | Lost Divisional |
| 2010 | Chicago Bears | 3 | New York Giants | 11–5 | 1–1 | Lost Conference |
| 2010 | Pittsburgh Steelers | 3 | Baltimore Ravens | 12–4 | 2–1 | Lost Super Bowl |
| 2010 | Kansas City Chiefs | 3 | Indianapolis Colts | 10–6 | 0–1 | Lost Wild Card |
| 2009 | Indianapolis Colts | 14 | New York Jets | 14–2 | 2–1 | Lost Super Bowl |
| 2008 | Tennessee Titans | 10 | New York Jets | 13–3 | 0–1 | Lost Divisional |
| 2007 | New England Patriots | 18 | New York Giants | 16–0 | 2–1 | Lost Super Bowl |
| 2006 | Indianapolis Colts | 9 | Dallas Cowboys | 12–4 | 4–0 | Won Super Bowl |
| 2005 | Indianapolis Colts | 13 | San Diego Chargers | 14–2 | 0–1 | Lost Divisional |
| 2004 | Philadelphia Eagles | 7 | Pittsburgh Steelers | 13–3 | 2–1 | Lost Super Bowl |
| 2003 | Kansas City Chiefs | 9 | Cincinnati Bengals | 13–3 | 0–1 | Lost Divisional |
| 2002 | Oakland Raiders | 4 | St. Louis Rams | 11–5 | 2–1 | Lost Super Bowl |
| 2002 | San Diego Chargers | 4 | Denver Broncos | 8–8 | - | DNQ |
| 2001 | St. Louis Rams | 6 | New Orleans Saints | 14–2 | 2–1 | Lost Super Bowl |
| 2000 | Minnesota Vikings | 7 | Tampa Bay Buccaneers | 11–5 | 1–1 | Lost Conference |
| 1999 | St. Louis Rams | 6 | Tennessee Titans | 13–3 | 3–0 | Won Super Bowl |
| 1998 | Denver Broncos | 13 | New York Giants | 14–2 | 3–0 | Won Super Bowl |
| 1997 | Denver Broncos | 6 | Oakland Raiders | 12–4 | 4–0 | Won Super Bowl |
| 1996 | Minnesota Vikings | 4 | New York Giants | 9–7 | 0–1 | Lost Wild Card |
| 1996 | Indianapolis Colts | 4 | Buffalo Bills | 9–7 | 0–1 | Lost Wild Card |
| 1996 | Kansas City Chiefs | 4 | San Diego Chargers | 9–7 | - | DNQ |
| 1995 | St. Louis Rams | 4 | Indianapolis Colts | 7–9 | - | DNQ |
| 1995 | Dallas Cowboys | 4 | Washington Redskins | 12–4 | 3–0 | Won Super Bowl |
| 1995 | Miami Dolphins | 4 | Indianapolis Colts | 9–7 | 0–1 | Lost Wild Card |
| 1994 | San Diego Chargers | 6 | Denver Broncos | 11–5 | 2–1 | Lost Super Bowl |
| 1993 | New Orleans Saints | 5 | Pittsburgh Steelers | 8–8 | - | DNQ |
| 1992 | Miami Dolphins | 6 | Indianapolis Colts | 11–5 | 1–1 | Lost Conference |
| 1991 | Washington Redskins | 11 | Dallas Cowboys | 14–2 | 3–0 | Won Super Bowl |
| 1990 | San Francisco 49ers | 10 | Los Angeles Rams | 14–2 | 1–1 | Lost Conference |
| 1990 | New York Giants | 10 | Philadelphia Eagles | 13–3 | 3–0 | Won Super Bowl |
| 1989 | Los Angeles Rams | 5 | Buffalo Bills | 11–5 | 2–1 | Lost Conference |
| 1988 | Cincinnati Bengals | 6 | New England Patriots | 12–4 | 2–1 | Lost Super Bowl |
| 1987 | Chicago Bears | 4 | New Orleans Saints | 11–4 | 0–1 | Lost Divisional |
| 1986 | Chicago Bears | 6 | Minnesota Vikings | 14–2 | 0–1 | Lost Divisional |
| 1986 | Denver Broncos | 6 | New York Jets | 11–5 | 2–1 | Lost Super Bowl |
| 1985 | Chicago Bears | 12 | Miami Dolphins | 15–1 | 3–0 | Won Super Bowl |
| 1984 | Miami Dolphins | 11 | San Diego Chargers | 14–2 | 2–1 | Lost Super Bowl |
| 1983 | Dallas Cowboys | 7 | Los Angeles Raiders | 12–4 | 0–1 | Lost Wild Card |
| 1982 | Washington Redskins | 4 | Dallas Cowboys | 8–1 | 4–0 | Won Super Bowl |
| 1981 | Philadelphia Eagles | 6 | Minnesota Vikings | 10–6 | 0–1 | Lost Wild Card |
| 1980 | Buffalo Bills | 5 | Baltimore Colts | 11–5 | 0–1 | Lost Divisional |
| 1979 | Tampa Bay Buccaneers | 5 | New York Giants | 10–6 | 1–1 | Lost Conference |
| 1978 | Los Angeles Rams | 7 | New Orleans Saints | 12–4 | 1–1 | Lost Conference |
| 1978 | Pittsburgh Steelers | 7 | Houston Oilers | 14–2 | 3–0 | Won Super Bowl |
| 1977 | Dallas Cowboys | 8 | St. Louis Cardinals | 12–2 | 3–0 | Won Super Bowl |
| 1976 | Minnesota Vikings | 6–0–1 | Chicago Bears | 11–2–1 | 2–1 | Lost Super Bowl |
| 1975 | Minnesota Vikings | 10 | Washington Redskins | 12–2 | 0–1 | Lost Divisional |
| 1974 | St. Louis Cardinals | 7 | Dallas Cowboys | 10–4 | 0–1 | Lost Divisional |
| 1973 | Minnesota Vikings | 9 | Atlanta Falcons | 12–2 | 2–1 | Lost Super Bowl |
| 1972 | Miami Dolphins | 17 | Perfect Season | 14–0 | 3–0 | Won Super Bowl |
| 1971 | Washington Redskins | 5 | Kansas City Chiefs | 9–4–1 | 0–1 | Lost Divisional |
| 1970 | Los Angeles Rams | 3 | San Francisco 49ers | 9–4–1 | - | DNQ |
| 1970 | Denver Broncos | 3 | Oakland Raiders | 5–8–1 | - | DNQ |
| 1970 | Detroit Lions | 3 | Washington Redskins | 10–4 | 0–1 | Lost Divisional |
| 1969 | Oakland Raiders (AFL) | 6–0–1 | Cincinnati Bengals | 12–1–1 | 1–1 | Lost Conference |
| 1969 | Los Angeles Rams | 11 | Minnesota Vikings | 11–3 | 0–1 | Lost Divisional |
| 1968 | Oakland Raiders (AFL) | 4 | San Diego Chargers | 12–2 | 1–1 | Lost Conference |
| 1968 | Dallas Cowboys | 6 | Green Bay Packers | 12–2 | 0–1 | Lost Divisional |
| 1968 | Los Angeles Rams | 6 | Baltimore Colts | 10–3–1 | - | DNQ |
| 1967 | San Diego Chargers (AFL) | 5–0–1 | Oakland Raiders | 8–5–1 | - | DNQ |
| 1967 | Baltimore Colts | 11–0–2 | Los Angeles Rams | 11–1–2 | - | DNQ |
| 1966 | New York Jets (AFL) | 4–0–1 | Houston Oilers | 6–6–2 | - | DNQ |
| 1966 | St. Louis Cardinals | 5–0–1 | Washington Redskins | 8–5–1 | - | DNQ |
| 1965 | San Diego Chargers (AFL) | 5–0–2 | Boston Patriots | 9–2–3 | 0–1 | Lost Championship |
| 1965 | Green Bay Packers | 6 | Chicago Bears | 10–3–1 | 2–0 | Won Championship |
| 1964 | Buffalo Bills (AFL) | 9 | Boston Patriots | 12–2 | 1–0 | Won Championship |
| 1964 | St. Louis Cardinals | 3–0–1 | Baltimore Colts | 9–3–2 | - | DNQ |
| 1964 | Cleveland Browns | 3–0–1 | Pittsburgh Steelers | 10–3–1 | 1–0 | Won Championship |
| 1963 | San Diego Chargers (AFL) | 3 | Denver Broncos | 11–3 | 1–0 | Won Championship |
| 1963 | Cleveland Browns | 6 | New York Giants | 10–4 | - | DNQ |
| 1962 | Dallas Texans (AFL) | 3 | San Diego Chargers | 11–3 | 1–0 | Won Championship |
| 1962 | Green Bay Packers | 10 | Detroit Lions | 13–1 | 1–0 | Won Championship |
| 1961 | San Diego Chargers (AFL) | 11 | Houston Oilers | 12–2 | 0–1 | Lost Championship |
| 1961 | Dallas Cowboys | 2 | Cleveland Browns | 4–9–1 | - | DNQ |
| 1961 | Philadelphia Eagles | 2 | St. Louis Cardinals | 10–4 | - | DNQ |
| 1961 | Detroit Lions | 2 | San Francisco 49ers | 8–5–1 | - | DNQ |
| 1960 | Denver Broncos (AFL) | 2 | New York Titans | 4–9–1 | - | DNQ |
| 1960 | Houston Oilers (AFL) | 2 | Oakland Raiders | 10–4 | 1–0 | Won Championship |
| 1960 | New York Giants | 3–0–1 | St. Louis Cardinals | 6–4–2 | - | DNQ |
| 1959 | Green Bay Packers | 3 | Los Angeles Rams | 7–5 | - | DNQ |
| 1958 | Baltimore Colts | 6 | New York Giants | 9–3 | 1–0 | Won Championship |
| 1957 | Baltimore Colts | 3 | Detroit Lions | 7–5 | - | DNQ |
| 1957 | Cleveland Browns | 3 | Philadelphia Eagles | 9–2–1 | 0–1 | Lost Championship |
| 1956 | Detroit Lions | 6 | Washington Redskins | 9–3 | - | DNQ |
| 1955 | Baltimore Colts | 3 | Chicago Bears | 5–6–1 | - | DNQ |
| 1955 | Los Angeles Rams | 3 | Green Bay Packers | 8–3–1 | 0–1 | Lost Championship |
| 1954 | San Francisco 49ers | 4–0–1 | Chicago Bears | 7–4–1 | - | DNQ |
| 1953 | Cleveland Browns | 11 | Philadelphia Eagles | 11–1 | 0–1 | Lost Championship |
| 1952 | San Francisco 49ers | 5 | Chicago Bears | 7–5 | - | DNQ |
| 1951 | New York Giants | 3–0–1 | Cleveland Browns | 9–2–1 | - | DNQ |
| 1950 | New York Giants | 3 | Pittsburgh Steelers | 10–3 | - | DNQ |
| 1949 | Los Angeles Rams | 6 | Philadelphia Eagles | 8–2–2 | 0–1 | Lost Championship |
| 1949 | Cleveland Browns (AAFC) | 4–0–1 | San Francisco 49ers | 9–1–2 | 2–0 | Won Championship |
| 1948 | Chicago Bears | 4 | Philadelphia Eagles | 10–2 | - | DNQ |
| 1948 | Cleveland Browns (AAFC) | 15 | Perfect Season | 14–0 | 1–0 | Won Championship |
| 1947 | Chicago Cardinals | 3 | Los Angeles Rams | 9–3 | 1–0 | Won Championship |
| 1947 | Cleveland Browns (AAFC) | 5 | Los Angeles Dons | 12–1–1 | 1–0 | Won Championship |
| 1946 | Washington Redskins | 3–0–1 | Philadelphia Eagles | 5–5–1 | - | DNQ |
| 1946 | Chicago Bears | 3–0–1 | New York Giants | 8–2–1 | 1–0 | Won Championship |
| 1946 | Cleveland Browns (AAFC) | 7 | San Francisco 49ers | 12–2 | 1–0 | Won Championship |
| 1945 | Cleveland Rams | 4 | Philadelphia Eagles | 9–1 | 1–0 | Won Championship |
| 1944 | Philadelphia Eagles | 5–0–2 | Chicago Bears | 7–1–2 | - | DNQ |
| 1943 | Chicago Bears | 7–0–1 | Washington Redskins | 8–1–1 | 1–0 | Won Championship |
| 1942 | Chicago Bears | 11 | Washington Redskins | 11–0 | 0–1 | Lost Championship |
| 1941 | New York Giants | 5 | Brooklyn Dodgers | 8–3 | 0–1 | Lost Championship |
| 1941 | Chicago Bears | 5 | Green Bay Packers | 10–1 | 2–0 | Won Championship |
| 1940 | Washington Redskins | 7 | Brooklyn Dodgers | 9–2 | 0–1 | Lost Championship |
| 1939 | New York Giants | 5–0–1 | Detroit Lions | 9–1–1 | 0–1 | Lost Championship |
| 1938 | Washington Redskins | 2–0–1 | New York Giants | 6–3–2 | - | DNQ |
| 1938 | Chicago Bears | 3 | Cleveland Rams | 6–5 | - | DNQ |
| 1937 | Chicago Bears | 5–0–1 | Green Bay Packers | 9–1–1 | 0–1 | Lost Championship |
| 1936 | Chicago Bears | 6 | Green Bay Packers | 9–3 | - | DNQ |
| 1935 | Chicago Cardinals | 2–0–1 | Pittsburgh Pirates | 6–4–2 | - | DNQ |
| 1934 | Chicago Bears | 13 | New York Giants | 13–0 | 0–1 | Lost Championship |
| 1933 | Chicago Bears | 6 | Washington Redskins | 10–2–1 | 1–0 | Won Championship |
| 1932 | Green Bay Packers | 8–0–1 | New York Giants | 10–3–1 | ^{†} | ^{†} 2nd place |
| 1931 | Green Bay Packers | 9 | Chicago Cardinals | 12–2 | ^{†} | ^{†} Champion |
| 1930 | Green Bay Packers | 8 | Chicago Cardinals | 10–3–1 | ^{†} | ^{†} Champion |
| 1929 | Green Bay Packers | 12–0–1 | Undefeated, 1 tie | 12–0–1 | ^{†} | ^{†} Champion |
| 1928 | Frankford Yellow Jackets | 3 | New York Yankees | 11–3–2 | ^{†} | ^{†} 2nd place |
| 1928 | Detroit Wolverines | 3 | Frankfort Yellow Jackets | 7–2–1 | ^{†} | ^{†} 3rd place |
| 1928 | Chicago Bears | 2–0–1 | Green Bay Packers | 7–5–1 | ^{†} | ^{†} 5th place |
| 1927 | Chicago Bears | 5–0–1 | New York Yankees | 9–3–2 | ^{†} | ^{†} 3rd place |
| 1926 | Chicago Bears | 11–0–2 | Frankfort Yellow Jackets | 12–1–3 | ^{†} | ^{†} 2nd place |
| 1925 | Detroit Panthers | 6–0–2 | Chicago Bears | 8–2–2 | ^{†} | ^{†} 3rd place |
| 1924 | Cleveland Bulldogs | 5–0–1 | Frankfort Yellow Jackets | 7–1–1 | ^{†} | ^{†} Champion |
| 1923 | Canton Bulldogs | 11–0–1 | Undefeated, 1 tie | 11–0–1 | ^{†} | ^{†} Champion |
| 1922 | Canton Bulldogs | 10–0–2 | Undefeated, 2 ties | 10–0–2 | ^{†} | ^{†} Champion |
| 1921 | Buffalo All-Americans | 9–0–2 | Chicago Staleys | 9–1–2 | ^{†} | ^{†} The Staley Swindle ^{*} 2nd place |
| 1920 | Akron Pros | 8–0–3 | Undefeated, 3 ties | 8–0–3 | ^{†} | ^{†} Champion |
| Year | Team | Wins before first loss | First loss | Regular | Playoffs | Postseason result |
| Year | Team | Wins before first loss | First loss | Final season record | | Postseason result |

^† Note 1: The NFL did not have playoff games until the 1933 season.
^* Note 2: Buffalo and Chicago both had 9–1 records (ties not counted in standings then). Chicago was awarded the championship when the league instituted a new tiebreaker rule at the end of the season.

== See also ==
- List of NFL franchise post-season streaks
- List of NFL franchise post-season droughts
- List of NFL champions (1920–1969)
- List of Super Bowl Champions
