= Timeline of the National Football League =

This timeline of the National Football League (NFL) tracks the history of each of the league's 32 current franchises from the early days of the league, through its merger with the American Football League (AFL). The history of franchises that began as independent teams, or as members of the Ohio League, New York Pro Football League, and other defunct leagues are shown as well.

== 1920–1932: Birth of the NFL ==
=== 1920 ===
The American Professional Football Association was formed on September 17, 1920, at Canton, Ohio, with Jim Thorpe elected president. The fourteen teams were mainly drawn from the Ohio League, Chicago Circuit, New York Pro Football League and other teams from the lower midwest. A $100 membership fee was charged. The Chicago Tigers folded after the season.

The Massillon Tigers were represented at the September 17 meeting by Ralph Hay, but they never played in the league. As such, they are considered a charter member on a technicality.

Team folded this season ^

1920 APFA teams
Akron Pros
Buffalo All-Americans
Canton Bulldogs
Chicago Tigers^
Cleveland Tigers
Columbus Panhandles
Dayton Triangles
Decatur Staleys
Detroit Heralds
Hammond Pros
Muncie Flyers
Racine Cardinals
Rochester Jeffersons
Rock Island Independents

=== 1921 ===
The American Professional Football Association was reorganized in Akron, Ohio on April 30, 1921, with Joe F. Carr elected as new league president. With the low entry barrier of a $100 membership fee, the number of teams ballooned to 21. Four of these franchises would last only one season, with Tonawanda Kardex only making it through a single game. Three other franchises folded mid-season. The Decatur Staleys moved to Chicago.

1921 name changes
1920 team name	1921 team name
Cleveland Tigers	Cleveland Indians
Decatur Staleys	Chicago Staleys
Detroit Heralds	Detroit Tigers

First season in APFA *
Team folded this season ^
Only season in the league *^

1921 APFA teams
Akron Pros
Buffalo All-Americans
Canton Bulldogs
Chicago Staleys
Cincinnati Celts *^
Cleveland Indians ^
Columbus Panhandles
Dayton Triangles
Detroit Tigers ^
Evansville Crimson Giants *
Green Bay Packers *
Hammond Pros
Louisville Brecks *
Minneapolis Marines *
Muncie Flyers ^
New York Brickley Giants *^
Racine Cardinals
Rochester Jeffersons
Rock Island Independents
Tonawanda Kardex *^
Washington Senators *^

=== 1922 ===
The APFA was renamed the National Football League on June 24, 1922. Four new franchises were awarded.

1922 name change
1921 team name	1922 team name
Chicago Staleys	Chicago Bears
Racine Cardinals	Chicago Cardinals

First season in NFL *
Team folded this season ^

1922 NFL teams
Akron Pros
Buffalo All-Americans
Canton Bulldogs
Chicago Bears
Chicago Cardinals
Columbus Panhandles
Dayton Triangles
Evansville Crimson Giants ^
Green Bay Packers
Hammond Pros
Louisville Brecks
Milwaukee Badgers *
Minneapolis Marines
Oorang Indians *
Racine Legion *
Rochester Jeffersons
Rock Island Independents
Toledo Maroons *

=== 1923 ===
A new and distinct Cleveland Indians franchise was formed. Two other teams joined the NFL, the Duluth Kelleys and the St. Louis All Stars. The St. Louis team folded after one season.

1923 name change
1922 team name	1923 team name
Columbus Panhandles	Columbus Tigers

First season in NFL *
Team folded this season ^
Last season before hiatus, rejoined league later §
Only season in the league *^

1923 NFL teams
Akron Pros
Buffalo All-Americans
Canton Bulldogs §
Chicago Bears
Chicago Cardinals
Cleveland Indians *
Columbus Tigers
Dayton Triangles
Duluth Kelleys *
Green Bay Packers
Louisville Brecks ^
Hammond Pros
Milwaukee Badgers
Minneapolis Marines
Oorang Indians ^
Racine Legion
Rochester Jeffersons
Rock Island Independents
St. Louis All Stars *^
Toledo Maroons ^

=== 1924 ===
Before the season, the owner of the Cleveland Indians bought the Canton Bulldogs and "mothballed" it, taking the team's nickname and players to Cleveland for the season. The Canton Bulldogs had won the NFL championship in 1923, and won it again as the Cleveland Bulldogs in 1924.

1924 name changes
1923 team name	1924 team name
Buffalo All-Americans	Buffalo Bisons
Cleveland Indians	Cleveland Bulldogs

First season in NFL *
Last season before hiatus, rejoined league later §
Only season in the league *^

1924 NFL teams
Akron Pros
Buffalo Bisons
Chicago Bears
Chicago Cardinals
Cleveland Bulldogs
Columbus Tigers
Dayton Triangles
Duluth Kelleys
Frankford Yellow Jackets *
Green Bay Packers
Hammond Pros
Kansas City Blues *
Kenosha Maroons *^
Milwaukee Badgers
Minneapolis Marines §
Racine Legion §
Rochester Jeffersons
Rock Island Independents

=== 1925 ===
The Canton Bulldogs were reactivated. Four other franchises were awarded, including most notably a New York City franchise awarded to Tim Mara and Will Gibson for a $2,500 membership fee, the New York Giants. This was the final season for the Rochester Jeffersons.

1925 name change
1924 team name	1925 team name
Kansas City Blues	Kansas City Cowboys

First season in NFL *
Last active season ^
Last season before hiatus, rejoined league later §
Team jumped to the AFL †
Rejoined the NFL **

1925 NFL teams
Akron Pros
Buffalo Bisons
Canton Bulldogs **
Chicago Bears
Chicago Cardinals
Cleveland Bulldogs §
Columbus Tigers
Dayton Triangles
Detroit Panthers *
Duluth Kelleys
Frankford Yellow Jackets
Green Bay Packers
Hammond Pros
Kansas City Cowboys
Milwaukee Badgers
New York Giants *
Pottsville Maroons *
Providence Steam Roller *
Rochester Jeffersons ^
Rock Island Independents †

=== 1926 ===
The league grew to 22 teams, a figure that would not be equaled in professional football until 1961, adding the Brooklyn Lions, the Hartford Blues, the Los Angeles Buccaneers, and the Louisville Colonels, with Racine Tornadoes re-entering.

At a league meeting held February 7, 1926, each franchise's roster was limited to a maximum of 18 players, with a minimum of 15.

1926 name changes
1925 team name	1926 team name
Akron Pros	Akron Indians
Buffalo Bisons	Buffalo Rangers
Duluth Kelleys	Duluth Eskimos
Racine Legion	Racine Tornadoes

Only season in the league *^
Rejoined the NFL **
Last active season ^

1926 NFL teams
Akron Indians ^
Brooklyn Lions *^
Buffalo Rangers
Canton Bulldogs ^
Chicago Bears
Chicago Cardinals
Columbus Tigers ^
Dayton Triangles
Detroit Panthers ^
Duluth Eskimos
Frankford Yellow Jackets
Green Bay Packers
Hammond Pros ^
Hartford Blues *^
Kansas City Cowboys ^
Los Angeles Buccaneers *^
Louisville Colonels *^
Milwaukee Badgers ^
New York Giants
Pottsville Maroons
Providence Steam Roller
Racine Tornadoes ** ^

=== 1927 ===
Prior to the season, the league decided to eliminate the financially weaker teams. As a result, the league dropped from 22 to 12 teams, and a majority of the remaining teams were centered around the East Coast instead of the Midwest, where the NFL had started. The New York Yankees were added from the American Football League (AFL I) and the Cleveland Bulldogs returned.

1927 name change
1926 team name	1927 team name
Buffalo Rangers	Buffalo Bisons

Rejoined the NFL **
Merged from AFL I *
Last active season ^
Last season before hiatus, rejoined league later §

1927 NFL teams
Buffalo Bisons §
Chicago Bears
Chicago Cardinals
Cleveland Bulldogs **
Dayton Triangles
Duluth Eskimos ^
Frankford Yellow Jackets
Green Bay Packers
New York Giants
New York Yankees *
Pottsville Maroons
Providence Steam Roller

=== 1928 ===
The league dropped to 10 teams, the Buffalo Bisons sat out the season and the Duluth Eskimos folded. The Cleveland Bulldogs moved and played as the Detroit Wolverines.

1928 name change
1927 team name	1928 team name
Cleveland Bulldogs	Detroit Wolverines

Last active season ^

1928 NFL teams
Chicago Bears
Chicago Cardinals
Dayton Triangles
Detroit Wolverines ^
Frankford Yellow Jackets
Green Bay Packers
New York Giants
New York Yankees ^
Pottsville Maroons
Providence Steam Roller

=== 1929 ===
The league increased back to 12 teams with the addition of two franchises, the Staten Island Stapletons and the Orange Tornadoes. Two mothballed teams activated for the season. Minneapolis re-entered as the Red Jackets along with the re-entry of the Buffalo Bisons.

1929 name changes
1928 team name	1929 team name
Minneapolis Marines	Minneapolis Red Jackets
Pottsville Maroons	Boston Bulldogs

First season in NFL *
Rejoined the NFL **
Last active season ^

1929 NFL teams
Boston Bulldogs ^
Buffalo Bisons ** ^
Chicago Bears
Chicago Cardinals
Dayton Triangles
Frankford Yellow Jackets
Green Bay Packers
Minneapolis Red Jackets **
New York Giants
Orange Tornadoes *
Providence Steam Roller
Staten Island Stapletons *

=== 1930 ===
Prior to the season, Brooklyn businessmen William B. Dwyer and John C. Depler bought the Dayton Triangles, moved it, and renamed it the Brooklyn Dodgers. The Orange Tornadoes relocated to Newark. The Portsmouth Spartans entered as a new team, bringing the total to 11 teams.

The league roster limit was expanded to a maximum of 20 players, with a minimum of 16 required.

1930 name changes
1929 team name	1930 team name
Dayton Triangles	Brooklyn Dodgers
Orange Tornadoes	Newark Tornadoes

First season in NFL *
Last active season ^

1930 NFL teams
Brooklyn Dodgers
Chicago Bears
Chicago Cardinals
Frankford Yellow Jackets
Green Bay Packers
Minneapolis Red Jackets ^
New York Giants
Newark Tornadoes ^
Portsmouth Spartans *
Providence Steam Roller
Staten Island Stapletons

=== 1931 ===
The league decreased to 10 teams due to financial hardships caused by the Great Depression. While the Cleveland Indians joined as an expansion team, the league lost the Minneapolis Red Jackets and the Newark Tornadoes, and the Frankford Yellow Jackets folded midway through the season.

Only season in the league *^
Last active season ^

1931 NFL teams
Brooklyn Dodgers
Chicago Bears
Chicago Cardinals
Cleveland Indians *^
Frankford Yellow Jackets ^
Green Bay Packers
New York Giants
Portsmouth Spartans
Providence Steam Roller ^
Staten Island Stapletons

=== 1932 ===
The Boston Braves enfranchised bringing the total to 8 teams.

First season in NFL *
Team folded this season ^

1932 NFL teams
Boston Braves *
Brooklyn Dodgers
Chicago Bears
Chicago Cardinals
Green Bay Packers
New York Giants
Portsmouth Spartans
Staten Island Stapletons ^

== 1933–1939: Start of Championship Game ==
=== 1933 ===
The barrier to entry was raised again with the July 8 decision to increase the league membership fee to $10,000. Despite the fee increase, three new teams were added — the Cincinnati Reds, Philadelphia Eagles, and Pittsburgh Pirates.

- The league split into Eastern and Western Divisions with the winner of each division playing in the NFL Championship Game.
- The 1933 season was the first in which no NFL team folded or suspended operations.

1933 name change
1932 team name	1933 team name
Boston Braves	Boston Redskins

First season in NFL *

1933 NFL teams
Eastern Division	Western Division
Boston Redskins	Chicago Bears
Brooklyn Dodgers	Chicago Cardinals
New York Giants	Cincinnati Reds *
Philadelphia Eagles *	Green Bay Packers
Pittsburgh Pirates *	Portsmouth Spartans

=== 1934 ===
- Portsmouth Spartans moved to Detroit and renamed the Lions.
- Cincinnati Reds ceased operations during the season and were replaced by the St Louis Gunners for the final 3 games.

1934 name change
1933 team name	1934 team name
Portsmouth Spartans	Detroit Lions

Only season in the league *^
Last active season ^

1934 NFL teams
Eastern Division	Western Division
Boston Redskins	Chicago Bears
Brooklyn Dodgers	Chicago Cardinals
New York Giants	Cincinnati Reds ^
Philadelphia Eagles	Detroit Lions
Pittsburgh Pirates	Green Bay Packers
	St. Louis Gunners*^

=== 1935–1936 ===
- Neither the Cincinnati Reds nor St. Louis Gunners returned for the 1935 season.

The NFL raised its roster limit to 24 players effective with the 1935 season and again to 25 players for 1936.

1935–1936 NFL teams
Eastern Division	Western Division
Boston Redskins	Chicago Bears
Brooklyn Dodgers	Chicago Cardinals
New York Giants	Detroit Lions
Philadelphia Eagles	Green Bay Packers
Pittsburgh Pirates	

=== 1937–1939 ===
- Cleveland Rams joined from the American Football League (AFL II).
- Boston Redskins moved to Washington, D.C.

The league raised the roster limit to 30 players per team effective with the 1938 season.

1937 name change
1936 team name	1937 team name
Boston Redskins	Washington Redskins

1937 is first season in NFL *

1937–1939 NFL teams
Eastern Division	Western Division
Brooklyn Dodgers	Chicago Bears
New York Giants	Chicago Cardinals
Philadelphia Eagles	Cleveland Rams *
Pittsburgh Pirates	Detroit Lions
Washington Redskins	Green Bay Packers

== The 1940s: World War II mergers and AAFC ==
=== 1940–1942 ===
- Pittsburgh franchise changed its nickname from the Pirates to the Steelers before the start of the 1940 season.

The NFL raised the maximum number of players allowed on a league roster from 30 to 33 players effective with the 1940 season.

1940 name change
1939 team name	1940 team name
Pittsburgh Pirates	Pittsburgh Steelers

Team mothballed after season, rejoined league 1944 §

1940–1942 NFL teams
Eastern Division	Western Division
Brooklyn Dodgers	Chicago Bears
New York Giants	Chicago Cardinals
Philadelphia Eagles	Cleveland Rams §
Pittsburgh Steelers	Detroit Lions
Washington Redskins	Green Bay Packers

=== 1943 ===
As America became more deeply embroiled in World War II, the Cleveland Rams suspend operations for the 1943 season due to a major loss of players. The Philadelphia Eagles and Pittsburgh Steelers were able to work around the player shortage by merging to form the "Phil-Pitt Steagles."

The size of the active roster reduced from 33 to 28 players per team. Intent of this reduction was to appease the Office of Defense Transportation by reducing the impact of travel by road teams. Additionally, teams primarily used day coaches rather than sleeper cars, a more efficient, albeit less comfortable mode of travel. This continued through the 1944 season.

Two teams merge for season †

1943 NFL teams
Eastern Division	Western Division
Brooklyn Dodgers	Chicago Bears
New York Giants	Chicago Cardinals
Phil-Pitt Steagles †	Detroit Lions
Washington Redskins	Green Bay Packers

=== 1944 ===
- Boston Yanks enfranchised.
- Cleveland Rams resumed operations.
- Steagles end merger, Eagles resumed operations.
- Steelers merged with the Cardinals to form "Card-Pitt".

1944 name change
1943 team name	1944 team name
Brooklyn Dodgers	Brooklyn Tigers

First season in NFL *
Rejoined the NFL **
Two teams merge for season †

1944 NFL teams
Eastern Division	Western Division
Boston Yanks *	Chicago Bears
Brooklyn Tigers	Card-Pitt †
New York Giants	Cleveland Rams **
Philadelphia Eagles	Detroit Lions
Washington Redskins	Green Bay Packers

=== 1945 ===
- Card-Pitt was split back into the Chicago Cardinals and Pittsburgh Steelers.
- Brooklyn Tigers franchise merged with the Boston Yanks, named simply "The Yanks".

The Active player limit was returned to its pre-war size of 33 players.

Two teams merge for season †

1945 NFL teams
Eastern Division	Western Division
The Yanks †	Chicago Bears
New York Giants	Chicago Cardinals
Philadelphia Eagles	Cleveland Rams
Pittsburgh Steelers	Detroit Lions
Washington Redskins	Green Bay Packers

=== 1946 ===
- The All-America Football Conference (AAFC) began operations with eight teams.
- Cleveland Rams moved to Los Angeles ahead of the 1946 season.
- With World War II at an end, the Boston Yanks resumed normal operations, although the Brooklyn Tigers franchise was permanently terminated.

1946 name change
1945 team name	1946 team name
Cleveland Rams	Los Angeles Rams

Only season in the league *^

1946 AAFC teams
Eastern Division	Western Division
Brooklyn Dodgers	Chicago Rockets
Buffalo Bisons	Cleveland Browns
Miami Seahawks *^	Los Angeles Dons
New York Yankees	San Francisco 49ers

1946 NFL teams
Eastern Division	Western Division
Boston Yanks	Chicago Bears
New York Giants	Chicago Cardinals
Philadelphia Eagles	Detroit Lions
Pittsburgh Steelers	Green Bay Packers
Washington Redskins	Los Angeles Rams

=== 1947–1948 ===
- Miami Seahawks declared bankruptcy and reorganized as the first incarnation of the Baltimore Colts.
- Buffalo Bisons renamed Buffalo Bills.

Effective with the 1948 season, the NFL again raised its roster limit for member teams, increasing the maximum from 33 to 35 players.

1947 name change
1946 team name	1947 team name
Buffalo Bisons	Buffalo Bills

1947 was first season in AAFC **
Last active season in 1948 ^

1947–1948 AAFC teams
Eastern Division	Western Division
Baltimore Colts **	Chicago Rockets
Brooklyn Dodgers ^	Cleveland Browns
Buffalo Bills	Los Angeles Dons
New York Yankees	San Francisco 49ers

1947–1948 NFL teams
Eastern Division	Western Division
Boston Yanks ^	Chicago Bears
New York Giants	Chicago Cardinals
Philadelphia Eagles	Detroit Lions
Pittsburgh Steelers	Green Bay Packers
Washington Redskins	Los Angeles Rams

=== 1949 ===
- The AAFC's Brooklyn Dodgers folded and its remains merged with the New York Yankees to become the Brooklyn–New York Yankees.
  - With one fewer team, the AAFC realigned into one division.
- Boston Yanks ceased operations after the 1948 season, with the remains of the team enfranchised in 1949 as the New York Bulldogs.

The size of the active roster was reduced to 32 players.

First season in NFL *

1949 AAFC teams
Baltimore Colts
Brooklyn–New York Yankees
Buffalo Bills
Chicago Rockets
Cleveland Browns
Los Angeles Dons
San Francisco 49ers

1949 NFL teams
Eastern Division	Western Division
New York Bulldogs *	Chicago Bears
New York Giants	Chicago Cardinals
Philadelphia Eagles	Detroit Lions
Pittsburgh Steelers	Green Bay Packers
Washington Redskins	Los Angeles Rams

== The 1950s: Addition of AAFC teams ==
=== 1950 ===
- Eastern Division renamed to American Conference.
- Western Division renamed to National Conference.
- San Francisco 49ers, Cleveland Browns, and the first Baltimore Colts all enfranchised from now-defunct All-America Football Conference. The Colts folded after the season.
- New York Bulldogs changed name to New York Yanks and moved to the National Conference.
- Chicago Cardinals moved to the American Conference.

1950 name change
1949 team name	1950 team name
New York Bulldogs	New York Yanks

Teams merge from AAFC **
Last active season ^

1950 NFL teams
American Conference	National Conference
Chicago Cardinals	Baltimore Colts ** ^
Cleveland Browns **	Chicago Bears
New York Giants	Detroit Lions
Philadelphia Eagles	Green Bay Packers
Pittsburgh Steelers	Los Angeles Rams
Washington Redskins	New York Yanks
	San Francisco 49ers **

=== 1951 ===
The NFL increased the maximum size of team rosters from 32 to 33 players effective with the 1951 season. This would remain in effect through 1956.

Last active season ^

1951 NFL teams
American Conference	National Conference
Chicago Cardinals	Chicago Bears
Cleveland Browns	Detroit Lions
New York Giants	Green Bay Packers
Philadelphia Eagles	Los Angeles Rams
Pittsburgh Steelers	New York Yanks ^
Washington Redskins	San Francisco 49ers

=== 1952 ===
- New York Yanks ceased operations after the 1951 season, with the remains of the team enfranchised for 1952 as the Dallas Texans, but the team terminated after one season. It remains the last NFL team to fold due to financial reasons.

Only season in the league *^

1952 NFL teams
American Conference	National Conference
Chicago Cardinals	Chicago Bears
Cleveland Browns	Dallas Texans *^
New York Giants	Detroit Lions
Philadelphia Eagles	Green Bay Packers
Pittsburgh Steelers	Los Angeles Rams
Washington Redskins	San Francisco 49ers

=== 1953–1959 ===
- The 1953 season saw a renaming of the league's two conferences, with the American Conference renamed the Eastern Conference and the National Conference renamed the Western Conference.
- A second and distinct Baltimore Colts team was enfranchised from the remains of the Dallas Texans.
- No NFL team has folded since 1953; all teams that existed in 1953 are still in operation as of 2025.

Effective with the 1957 season, the NFL raised its roster limit from 33 to 35 players per team. The roster limit was raised again for the 1959 season, this time to 36 players per team.

1953 is first season in NFL *

1953–1959 NFL teams
Eastern Conference	Western Conference
Chicago Cardinals	Baltimore Colts *
Cleveland Browns	Chicago Bears
New York Giants	Detroit Lions
Philadelphia Eagles	Green Bay Packers
Pittsburgh Steelers	Los Angeles Rams
Washington Redskins	San Francisco 49ers

== The 1960s: NFL and AFL ==
=== 1960 ===
- The American Football League (AFL) began operations with eight teams as a rival to the NFL.
- Dallas Cowboys were enfranchised by the NFL.
- Chicago Cardinals moved to St. Louis.

The roster limit was raised to 38 players per team for the 1960 season.

1960 name change
1959 team name	1960 team name
Chicago Cardinals	St. Louis Cardinals

First season in NFL *
First season in AFL **

1960 AFL teams
Eastern Division	Western Division
Boston Patriots	Dallas Texans
Buffalo Bills	Denver Broncos
Houston Oilers	Los Angeles Chargers
Titans of New York	Oakland Raiders

1960 NFL teams
Eastern Conference	Western Conference
Cleveland Browns	Baltimore Colts
New York Giants	Chicago Bears
Philadelphia Eagles	Dallas Cowboys *
Pittsburgh Steelers	Detroit Lions
St. Louis Cardinals	Green Bay Packers
Washington Redskins	Los Angeles Rams
	San Francisco 49ers

=== 1961–1962 ===
- Minnesota Vikings enfranchised by the NFL in 1961, with the Dallas Cowboys moving to the Eastern Conference.
- AFL's Los Angeles Chargers moved to San Diego.

The league also reduced the roster limit from 38 back to 36 players during these two years.

1961 name change
1960 team name	1961 team name
Los Angeles Chargers	San Diego Chargers

1961 is first season in NFL *

1961–1962 AFL teams
Eastern	Western
Boston Patriots	Dallas Texans
Buffalo Bills	Denver Broncos
Houston Oilers	Oakland Raiders
Titans of New York	San Diego Chargers

1961–1962 NFL teams
Eastern	Western
Cleveland Browns	Baltimore Colts
Dallas Cowboys	Chicago Bears
New York Giants	Detroit Lions
Philadelphia Eagles	Green Bay Packers
Pittsburgh Steelers	Los Angeles Rams
St. Louis Cardinals	Minnesota Vikings *
Washington Redskins	San Francisco 49ers

=== 1963–1965 ===
- Facing a divided sports market due to the establishment of the NFL's Dallas Cowboys, the AFL's Dallas Texans moved to Kansas City to become the Kansas City Chiefs.
- Titans of New York renamed as the New York Jets.

In the NFL, the roster limit was raised in 1963 to 37 players and in 1964 to 40 players — a number which remained constant until the end of the 1973 season.

1963 name changes
1962 team name	1963 team name
Dallas Texans	Kansas City Chiefs
Titans of New York	New York Jets

1963–1965 AFL teams
Eastern	Western
Boston Patriots	Denver Broncos
Buffalo Bills	Kansas City Chiefs
Houston Oilers	Oakland Raiders
New York Jets	San Diego Chargers

1963–1965 NFL teams
Eastern	Western
Cleveland Browns	Baltimore Colts
Dallas Cowboys	Chicago Bears
New York Giants	Detroit Lions
Philadelphia Eagles	Green Bay Packers
Pittsburgh Steelers	Los Angeles Rams
St. Louis Cardinals	Minnesota Vikings
Washington Redskins	San Francisco 49ers

=== 1966 ===
- Atlanta Falcons enfranchised by the NFL and Miami Dolphins by the AFL.
- The two leagues played the first AFL–NFL championship game (later known as the Super Bowl) after the conclusion of the season.

First season in NFL *
First season in AFL **

1966 AFL teams
Eastern	Western
Boston Patriots	Denver Broncos
Buffalo Bills	Kansas City Chiefs
Houston Oilers	Oakland Raiders
Miami Dolphins **	San Diego Chargers
New York Jets	

1966 NFL teams
Eastern	Western
Atlanta Falcons *	Baltimore Colts
Cleveland Browns	Chicago Bears
Dallas Cowboys	Detroit Lions
New York Giants	Green Bay Packers
Philadelphia Eagles	Los Angeles Rams
Pittsburgh Steelers	Minnesota Vikings
St. Louis Cardinals	San Francisco 49ers
Washington Redskins	

=== 1967 ===
- NFL Eastern Conference divided into Capitol and Century Divisions.
- NFL Western Conference divided into Coastal and Central Divisions.
- New Orleans Saints enfranchised by the NFL.
- Atlanta Falcons moved to the Western Conference.

First season in NFL *

1967 AFL teams
Eastern	Western
Boston Patriots	Denver Broncos
Buffalo Bills	Kansas City Chiefs
Houston Oilers	Oakland Raiders
Miami Dolphins	San Diego Chargers
New York Jets	

1967 NFL teams
Eastern		Western	
Capitol	Century	Central	Coastal
Dallas Cowboys	Cleveland Browns	Chicago Bears	Atlanta Falcons
New Orleans Saints *	New York Giants	Detroit Lions	Baltimore Colts
Philadelphia Eagles	Pittsburgh Steelers	Green Bay Packers	Los Angeles Rams
Washington Redskins	St. Louis Cardinals	Minnesota Vikings	San Francisco 49ers

=== 1968 ===
- Cincinnati Bengals enfranchised by the AFL.
- New York Giants moved to the Capitol Division.
- New Orleans Saints moved to the Century Division.

First season in AFL **

1968 AFL teams
Eastern	Western
Boston Patriots	Cincinnati Bengals **
Buffalo Bills	Denver Broncos
Houston Oilers	Kansas City Chiefs
Miami Dolphins	Oakland Raiders
New York Jets	San Diego Chargers

1968 NFL teams
Eastern		Western	
Capitol	Century	Central	Coastal
Dallas Cowboys	Cleveland Browns	Chicago Bears	Atlanta Falcons
New York Giants	New Orleans Saints	Detroit Lions	Baltimore Colts
Philadelphia Eagles	Pittsburgh Steelers	Green Bay Packers	Los Angeles Rams
Washington Redskins	St. Louis Cardinals	Minnesota Vikings	San Francisco 49ers

=== 1969 ===
- New York Giants moved back to the Century Division.
- New Orleans Saints moved back to the Capitol Division.

1969 AFL teams
Eastern	Western
Boston Patriots	Cincinnati Bengals
Buffalo Bills	Denver Broncos
Houston Oilers	Kansas City Chiefs
Miami Dolphins	Oakland Raiders
New York Jets	San Diego Chargers

1969 NFL teams
Eastern		Western	
Capitol	Century	Central	Coastal
Dallas Cowboys	Cleveland Browns	Chicago Bears	Atlanta Falcons
New Orleans Saints	New York Giants	Detroit Lions	Baltimore Colts
Philadelphia Eagles	Pittsburgh Steelers	Green Bay Packers	Los Angeles Rams
Washington Redskins	St. Louis Cardinals	Minnesota Vikings	San Francisco 49ers

== The 1970s: AFL–NFL merger ==
=== 1970 ===
- AFL and NFL merge
  - AFL Eastern and Western Divisions became AFC East and AFC West, respectively.
  - AFC Central formed
  - NFL Capitol Division became nucleus of NFC East.
  - NFL Central Division became NFC Central.
  - NFL Coastal Division became nucleus of NFC West.
  - NFL Century Division teams split up between AFC Central and NFC East.
- Baltimore moved from NFL Coastal to AFC East.
- Cincinnati moved from AFL West to AFC Central.
- Houston moved from AFL East to AFC Central.
- Cleveland and Pittsburgh moved from NFL Century to AFC Central.
- New York Giants and St. Louis moved from NFL Century to NFC East.
- New Orleans moved from NFL Capitol to NFC West.

1970 NFL teams
AFC	East	Central	West
AFC	Baltimore Colts	Cincinnati Bengals	Denver Broncos
AFC	Boston Patriots	Cleveland Browns	Kansas City Chiefs
AFC	Buffalo Bills	Houston Oilers	Oakland Raiders
AFC	Miami Dolphins	Pittsburgh Steelers	San Diego Chargers
AFC	New York Jets		
NFC	East	Central	West
NFC	Dallas Cowboys	Chicago Bears	Atlanta Falcons
NFC	New York Giants	Detroit Lions	Los Angeles Rams
NFC	Philadelphia Eagles	Green Bay Packers	New Orleans Saints
NFC	St. Louis Cardinals	Minnesota Vikings	San Francisco 49ers
NFC	Washington Redskins		

=== 1971–1975 ===
- Boston Patriots renamed New England Patriots.

In 1974 the size of the active player roster was increased from 40 to 47 players before being lowered to 43 the following season.

1971–1975 NFL teams
AFC	East	Central	West
AFC	Baltimore Colts	Cincinnati Bengals	Denver Broncos
AFC	Buffalo Bills	Cleveland Browns	Kansas City Chiefs
AFC	Miami Dolphins	Houston Oilers	Oakland Raiders
AFC	New England Patriots	Pittsburgh Steelers	San Diego Chargers
AFC	New York Jets		
NFC	East	Central	West
NFC	Dallas Cowboys	Chicago Bears	Atlanta Falcons
NFC	New York Giants	Detroit Lions	Los Angeles Rams
NFC	Philadelphia Eagles	Green Bay Packers	New Orleans Saints
NFC	St. Louis Cardinals	Minnesota Vikings	San Francisco 49ers
NFC	Washington Redskins		

=== 1976 ===
- Seattle Seahawks and Tampa Bay Buccaneers enfranchised.

First season in NFL *

1976 NFL teams
AFC	East	Central	West
AFC	Baltimore Colts	Cincinnati Bengals	Denver Broncos
AFC	Buffalo Bills	Cleveland Browns	Kansas City Chiefs
AFC	Miami Dolphins	Houston Oilers	Oakland Raiders
AFC	New England Patriots	Pittsburgh Steelers	San Diego Chargers
AFC	New York Jets		Tampa Bay Buccaneers *
NFC	East	Central	West
NFC	Dallas Cowboys	Chicago Bears	Atlanta Falcons
NFC	New York Giants	Detroit Lions	Los Angeles Rams
NFC	Philadelphia Eagles	Green Bay Packers	New Orleans Saints
NFC	St. Louis Cardinals	Minnesota Vikings	San Francisco 49ers
NFC	Washington Redskins		Seattle Seahawks *

=== 1977–1981 ===
- Seattle moved from NFC West to AFC West.
- Tampa Bay moved from AFC West to NFC Central.

In 1978 the size of the active roster was increased from 43 to 45 players, where it would remain through the 1981 season.

1977–1981 NFL teams
AFC	East	Central	West
AFC	Baltimore Colts	Cincinnati Bengals	Denver Broncos
AFC	Buffalo Bills	Cleveland Browns	Kansas City Chiefs
AFC	Miami Dolphins	Houston Oilers	Oakland Raiders
AFC	New England Patriots	Pittsburgh Steelers	San Diego Chargers
AFC	New York Jets		Seattle Seahawks
NFC	East	Central	West
NFC	Dallas Cowboys	Chicago Bears	Atlanta Falcons
NFC	New York Giants	Detroit Lions	Los Angeles Rams
NFC	Philadelphia Eagles	Green Bay Packers	New Orleans Saints
NFC	St. Louis Cardinals	Minnesota Vikings	San Francisco 49ers
NFC	Washington Redskins	Tampa Bay Buccaneers	

== The 1980s and 1990s: Relocation and expansion ==
=== 1982–1983 ===
- Oakland Raiders moved to Los Angeles in 1982.

After the first two games of the 1982 season the size of the active roster was increased from 45 to 49 players, where it would remain through the end of the 1984 season.

1982–1983 NFL teams
AFC	East	Central	West
AFC	Baltimore Colts	Cincinnati Bengals	Denver Broncos
AFC	Buffalo Bills	Cleveland Browns	Kansas City Chiefs
AFC	Miami Dolphins	Houston Oilers	Los Angeles Raiders
AFC	New England Patriots	Pittsburgh Steelers	San Diego Chargers
AFC	New York Jets		Seattle Seahawks
NFC	East	Central	West
NFC	Dallas Cowboys	Chicago Bears	Atlanta Falcons
NFC	New York Giants	Detroit Lions	Los Angeles Rams
NFC	Philadelphia Eagles	Green Bay Packers	New Orleans Saints
NFC	St. Louis Cardinals	Minnesota Vikings	San Francisco 49ers
NFC	Washington Redskins	Tampa Bay Buccaneers	

=== 1984–1987 ===
- Baltimore Colts moved to Indianapolis in 1984.

In 1985 size of the active roster was reduced again from 49 to 45 — where it would remain through the end of the 1990 season.

1984–1987 NFL teams
AFC	East	Central	West
AFC	Buffalo Bills	Cincinnati Bengals	Denver Broncos
AFC	Indianapolis Colts	Cleveland Browns	Kansas City Chiefs
AFC	Miami Dolphins	Houston Oilers	Los Angeles Raiders
AFC	New England Patriots	Pittsburgh Steelers	San Diego Chargers
AFC	New York Jets		Seattle Seahawks
NFC	East	Central	West
NFC	Dallas Cowboys	Chicago Bears	Atlanta Falcons
NFC	New York Giants	Detroit Lions	Los Angeles Rams
NFC	Philadelphia Eagles	Green Bay Packers	New Orleans Saints
NFC	St. Louis Cardinals	Minnesota Vikings	San Francisco 49ers
NFC	Washington Redskins	Tampa Bay Buccaneers	

=== 1988–1993 ===
- St. Louis Cardinals moved to Phoenix in 1988.

In 1991 the league allowed teams to add a third "emergency" quarterback to their active 45 man rosters—a system that would remain in effect through the end of the 2010 season.

1988–1993 NFL teams
AFC	East	Central	West
AFC	Buffalo Bills	Cincinnati Bengals	Denver Broncos
AFC	Indianapolis Colts	Cleveland Browns	Kansas City Chiefs
AFC	Miami Dolphins	Houston Oilers	Los Angeles Raiders
AFC	New England Patriots	Pittsburgh Steelers	San Diego Chargers
AFC	New York Jets		Seattle Seahawks
NFC	East	Central	West
NFC	Dallas Cowboys	Chicago Bears	Atlanta Falcons
NFC	New York Giants	Detroit Lions	Los Angeles Rams
NFC	Philadelphia Eagles	Green Bay Packers	New Orleans Saints
NFC	Phoenix Cardinals	Minnesota Vikings	San Francisco 49ers
NFC	Washington Redskins	Tampa Bay Buccaneers	

=== 1994 ===
- Phoenix Cardinals renamed Arizona Cardinals.

1994 NFL teams
AFC	East	Central	West
AFC	Buffalo Bills	Cincinnati Bengals	Denver Broncos
AFC	Indianapolis Colts	Cleveland Browns	Kansas City Chiefs
AFC	Miami Dolphins	Houston Oilers	Los Angeles Raiders
AFC	New England Patriots	Pittsburgh Steelers	San Diego Chargers
AFC	New York Jets		Seattle Seahawks
NFC	East	Central	West
NFC	Arizona Cardinals	Chicago Bears	Atlanta Falcons
NFC	Dallas Cowboys	Detroit Lions	Los Angeles Rams
NFC	New York Giants	Green Bay Packers	New Orleans Saints
NFC	Philadelphia Eagles	Minnesota Vikings	San Francisco 49ers
NFC	Washington Redskins	Tampa Bay Buccaneers	

=== 1995 ===
- Carolina Panthers and Jacksonville Jaguars enfranchised.
- Los Angeles Raiders moved back to Oakland.
- Los Angeles Rams moved to St. Louis.

First season in NFL *

1995 NFL teams
AFC	East	Central	West
AFC	Buffalo Bills	Cincinnati Bengals	Denver Broncos
AFC	Indianapolis Colts	Cleveland Browns	Kansas City Chiefs
AFC	Miami Dolphins	Houston Oilers	Oakland Raiders
AFC	New England Patriots	Jacksonville Jaguars *	San Diego Chargers
AFC	New York Jets	Pittsburgh Steelers	Seattle Seahawks
NFC	East	Central	West
NFC	Arizona Cardinals	Chicago Bears	Atlanta Falcons
NFC	Dallas Cowboys	Detroit Lions	Carolina Panthers *
NFC	New York Giants	Green Bay Packers	New Orleans Saints
NFC	Philadelphia Eagles	Minnesota Vikings	St. Louis Rams
NFC	Washington Redskins	Tampa Bay Buccaneers	San Francisco 49ers

=== 1996 ===
- Cleveland Browns franchise deactivated.
- Baltimore Ravens enfranchised with remains of deactivated Cleveland Browns.

First season in NFL *

1996 NFL teams
AFC	East	Central	West
AFC	Buffalo Bills	Baltimore Ravens *	Denver Broncos
AFC	Indianapolis Colts	Cincinnati Bengals	Kansas City Chiefs
AFC	Miami Dolphins	Houston Oilers	Oakland Raiders
AFC	New England Patriots	Jacksonville Jaguars	San Diego Chargers
AFC	New York Jets	Pittsburgh Steelers	Seattle Seahawks
NFC	East	Central	West
NFC	Arizona Cardinals	Chicago Bears	Atlanta Falcons
NFC	Dallas Cowboys	Detroit Lions	Carolina Panthers
NFC	New York Giants	Green Bay Packers	New Orleans Saints
NFC	Philadelphia Eagles	Minnesota Vikings	St. Louis Rams
NFC	Washington Redskins	Tampa Bay Buccaneers	San Francisco 49ers

=== 1997–1998 ===
- Houston Oilers announced that they will move to Nashville and renamed the Tennessee Oilers. They played the 1997 season in Memphis and the 1998 season at Vanderbilt Stadium in Nashville while a new stadium was built in Nashville.

1997–1998 NFL teams
AFC	East	Central	West
AFC	Buffalo Bills	Baltimore Ravens	Denver Broncos
AFC	Indianapolis Colts	Cincinnati Bengals	Kansas City Chiefs
AFC	Miami Dolphins	Jacksonville Jaguars	Oakland Raiders
AFC	New England Patriots	Pittsburgh Steelers	San Diego Chargers
AFC	New York Jets	Tennessee Oilers	Seattle Seahawks
NFC	East	Central	West
NFC	Arizona Cardinals	Chicago Bears	Atlanta Falcons
NFC	Dallas Cowboys	Detroit Lions	Carolina Panthers
NFC	New York Giants	Green Bay Packers	New Orleans Saints
NFC	Philadelphia Eagles	Minnesota Vikings	St. Louis Rams
NFC	Washington Redskins	Tampa Bay Buccaneers	San Francisco 49ers

=== 1999–2001 ===
- Cleveland Browns franchise reinstated.
- Tennessee Oilers renamed Tennessee Titans.

1999–2001 NFL teams
AFC	East	Central	West
AFC	Buffalo Bills	Baltimore Ravens	Denver Broncos
AFC	Indianapolis Colts	Cincinnati Bengals	Kansas City Chiefs
AFC	Miami Dolphins	Cleveland Browns	Oakland Raiders
AFC	New England Patriots	Jacksonville Jaguars	San Diego Chargers
AFC	New York Jets	Pittsburgh Steelers	Seattle Seahawks
AFC		Tennessee Titans	
NFC	East	Central	West
NFC	Arizona Cardinals	Chicago Bears	Atlanta Falcons
NFC	Dallas Cowboys	Detroit Lions	Carolina Panthers
NFC	New York Giants	Green Bay Packers	New Orleans Saints
NFC	Philadelphia Eagles	Minnesota Vikings	St. Louis Rams
NFC	Washington Redskins	Tampa Bay Buccaneers	San Francisco 49ers

== The 2000s: Realignment ==
=== 2002–2015 ===
- The NFL realigned to create four divisions in each conference with four teams in each division.
  - Arizona (NFC East) and Seattle (AFC West) joined the NFC West.
  - NFC Central renamed NFC North.
  - AFC Central renamed AFC North.
  - NFC South created.
    - Tampa Bay moved from the old NFC Central.
    - Atlanta, Carolina, and New Orleans moved from the NFC West.
  - AFC South created.
    - Jacksonville and Tennessee moved from the old AFC Central.
    - Indianapolis moved from the AFC East.
  - Houston Texans enfranchised.

In 2011 the active roster limit was shifted from 45 + 1 emergency quarterback to an undifferentiated 46 players. This would remain in effect through the end of the 2019 season.

2002 is first season in NFL *

2002–2015 NFL teams
AFC	East	North	South	West
AFC	Buffalo Bills	Baltimore Ravens	Houston Texans *	Denver Broncos
AFC	Miami Dolphins	Cincinnati Bengals	Indianapolis Colts	Kansas City Chiefs
AFC	New England Patriots	Cleveland Browns	Jacksonville Jaguars	Oakland Raiders
AFC	New York Jets	Pittsburgh Steelers	Tennessee Titans	San Diego Chargers
NFC	East	North	South	West
NFC	Dallas Cowboys	Chicago Bears	Atlanta Falcons	Arizona Cardinals
NFC	New York Giants	Detroit Lions	Carolina Panthers	St. Louis Rams
NFC	Philadelphia Eagles	Green Bay Packers	New Orleans Saints	San Francisco 49ers
NFC	Washington Redskins	Minnesota Vikings	Tampa Bay Buccaneers	Seattle Seahawks

=== 2016 ===
- St. Louis Rams returned to Los Angeles.

2016 NFL teams
AFC	East	North	South	West
AFC	Buffalo Bills	Baltimore Ravens	Houston Texans	Denver Broncos
AFC	Miami Dolphins	Cincinnati Bengals	Indianapolis Colts	Kansas City Chiefs
AFC	New England Patriots	Cleveland Browns	Jacksonville Jaguars	Oakland Raiders
AFC	New York Jets	Pittsburgh Steelers	Tennessee Titans	San Diego Chargers
NFC	East	North	South	West
NFC	Dallas Cowboys	Chicago Bears	Atlanta Falcons	Arizona Cardinals
NFC	New York Giants	Detroit Lions	Carolina Panthers	Los Angeles Rams
NFC	Philadelphia Eagles	Green Bay Packers	New Orleans Saints	San Francisco 49ers
NFC	Washington Redskins	Minnesota Vikings	Tampa Bay Buccaneers	Seattle Seahawks

=== 2017–2019 ===
- San Diego Chargers returned to Los Angeles.

2017–2019 NFL teams
AFC	East	North	South	West
AFC	Buffalo Bills	Baltimore Ravens	Houston Texans	Denver Broncos
AFC	Miami Dolphins	Cincinnati Bengals	Indianapolis Colts	Kansas City Chiefs
AFC	New England Patriots	Cleveland Browns	Jacksonville Jaguars	Los Angeles Chargers
AFC	New York Jets	Pittsburgh Steelers	Tennessee Titans	Oakland Raiders
NFC	East	North	South	West
NFC	Dallas Cowboys	Chicago Bears	Atlanta Falcons	Arizona Cardinals
NFC	New York Giants	Detroit Lions	Carolina Panthers	Los Angeles Rams
NFC	Philadelphia Eagles	Green Bay Packers	New Orleans Saints	San Francisco 49ers
NFC	Washington Redskins	Minnesota Vikings	Tampa Bay Buccaneers	Seattle Seahawks

=== 2020–2021 ===
- Oakland Raiders moved to Las Vegas.
- Washington Redskins adopted the temporary name of Washington Football Team in response to controversy over their previous name.

The size of the active roster was increased to 47 players — 48 if there were 8 offensive linemen activated.

2020–2021 NFL teams
AFC	East	North	South	West
AFC	Buffalo Bills	Baltimore Ravens	Houston Texans	Denver Broncos
AFC	Miami Dolphins	Cincinnati Bengals	Indianapolis Colts	Kansas City Chiefs
AFC	New England Patriots	Cleveland Browns	Jacksonville Jaguars	Las Vegas Raiders
AFC	New York Jets	Pittsburgh Steelers	Tennessee Titans	Los Angeles Chargers
NFC	East	North	South	West
NFC	Dallas Cowboys	Chicago Bears	Atlanta Falcons	Arizona Cardinals
NFC	New York Giants	Detroit Lions	Carolina Panthers	Los Angeles Rams
NFC	Philadelphia Eagles	Green Bay Packers	New Orleans Saints	San Francisco 49ers
NFC	Washington Football Team	Minnesota Vikings	Tampa Bay Buccaneers	Seattle Seahawks

=== 2022–present ===
- Washington Football Team was renamed Washington Commanders in 2022.

In 2023 the 47 man active roster was expanded to allow a third "emergency" quarterback.

2022–present NFL teams
AFC	East	North	South	West
AFC	Buffalo Bills	Baltimore Ravens	Houston Texans	Denver Broncos
AFC	Miami Dolphins	Cincinnati Bengals	Indianapolis Colts	Kansas City Chiefs
AFC	New England Patriots	Cleveland Browns	Jacksonville Jaguars	Las Vegas Raiders
AFC	New York Jets	Pittsburgh Steelers	Tennessee Titans	Los Angeles Chargers
NFC	East	North	South	West
NFC	Dallas Cowboys	Chicago Bears	Atlanta Falcons	Arizona Cardinals
NFC	New York Giants	Detroit Lions	Carolina Panthers	Los Angeles Rams
NFC	Philadelphia Eagles	Green Bay Packers	New Orleans Saints	San Francisco 49ers
NFC	Washington Commanders	Minnesota Vikings	Tampa Bay Buccaneers	Seattle Seahawks

== See also ==
- History of the National Football League
- List of defunct NFL franchises
- NFL franchise moves and mergers
- Potential London NFL franchise
