= 1928 Dayton Triangles season =

National Football League team season

- Owner: Dayton Engineering Laboratories Company
- Head coach: Faye Abbott
- Home stadium: Traveling team

Results
- Record: 0–7
- League place: 10th NFL

The 1928 Dayton Triangles season was their ninth in the National Football League (NFL). The team played all seven games of its schedule on the road.

The team failed to improve on their previous output of 1–6–1, scoring just 9 points all year and losing all 7 of its contests — 6 by shutout. They finished in last place, tenth in the league.

== Schedule ==
Week	Date	Opponent	Result	Record	Venue	Recap
1	September 29	at Frankford Yellow Jackets	L 0–6	0–1	Frankford Stadium	Recap
2	October 7	at Chicago Cardinals	L 0–7	0–2	Normal Park	Recap
3	October 14	at Providence Steam Roller	L 0–28	0–3	Cycledrome	Recap
4	October 20	at Frankford Yellow Jackets	L 9–13	0–4	Frankford Stadium	Recap
5	October 28	at Green Bay Packers	L 0–17	0–5	City Stadium	Recap
6	November 11	at Chicago Bears	L 0–27	0–6	Wrigley Field	Recap
7	November 29	at Detroit Wolverines	L 0–33	0–7	University of Detroit Stadium	Recap

== Standings ==
NFL standings
	W	L	T	PCT	PF	PA	STK
Providence Steam Roller	8	1	2	.889	128	42	T1
Frankford Yellow Jackets	11	3	2	.786	175	84	W2
Detroit Wolverines	7	2	1	.778	189	76	W4
Green Bay Packers	6	4	3	.600	120	92	W1
Chicago Bears	7	5	1	.583	182	85	L2
New York Giants	4	7	2	.364	79	136	L5
New York Yankees	4	8	1	.333	103	179	W1
Pottsville Maroons	2	8	0	.200	74	134	L1
Chicago Cardinals	1	5	0	.167	7	107	L4
Dayton Triangles	0	7	0	.000	9	131	L7

Note: Tie games were not officially counted in the standings until 1972.
