= 1928 New York Yankees (NFL) season =

National Football League team season

1928 New York Yankees season
- Head coach: Dick Rauch

Results
- Record: 4–8–1
- Division place: 7th NFL
- Playoffs: No playoffs until 1932

The 1928 New York Yankees season was their second and final in the league. The team failed to improve on their previous output of 7–8–1, winning only four games. They finished seventh in the league.

== Schedule ==
Week	Date	Opponent	Result	Record	Attendance	Venue	Sources
1	Bye						
2	September 30	at Providence Steam Roller	L 7–20	0–1		Cycledrome	
3	October 7	at Pottsville Maroons	L 7–9	0–2		Minersville Park	
4	October 13	at Frankford Yellow Jackets	W 13–0	1–2		Frankford Stadium	
4	October 14	Detroit Wolverines	L 12–35	1–3	18,000	Yankee Stadium	
5	October 21	Providence Steam Roller	L 6–12	1–4	8,000	Yankee Stadium	
6	October 28	New York Giants	L 7–10	1–5		Yankee Stadium	
7	November 4	at Chicago Bears	L 0–27	1–6		Wrigley Field	
8	November 11	at Green Bay Packers	T 0–0	1–6–1		City Stadium	
9	November 18	at Detroit Wolverines	L 0–13	1–7–1		University of Detroit Stadium	
10	November 25	Chicago Cardinals	W 19–0	2–7–1		Yankee Stadium	
11	December 2	at New York Giants	W 19–13	3–7–1		Polo Grounds	
12	December 9	Detroit Wolverines	L 6–34	3–8–1		Yankee Stadium	
13	December 16	New York Giants	W 7–6	4–8–1		Yankee Stadium	

== Standings ==
NFL standings
	W	L	T	PCT	PF	PA	STK
Providence Steam Roller	8	1	2	.889	128	42	T1
Frankford Yellow Jackets	11	3	2	.786	175	84	W2
Detroit Wolverines	7	2	1	.778	189	76	W4
Green Bay Packers	6	4	3	.600	120	92	W1
Chicago Bears	7	5	1	.583	182	85	L2
New York Giants	4	7	2	.364	79	136	L5
New York Yankees	4	8	1	.333	103	179	W1
Pottsville Maroons	2	8	0	.200	74	134	L1
Chicago Cardinals	1	5	0	.167	7	107	L4
Dayton Triangles	0	7	0	.000	9	131	L7

Note: Tie games were not officially counted in the standings until 1972.
