= NFL franchise moves and mergers =

Throughout the years, a number of teams in the National Football League (NFL) have either moved or merged.

In its early years, the NFL was not stable and teams moved frequently to survive, or folded only to be resurrected in a different city with the same players and owners. The Great Depression era saw most small-town NFL teams move to larger cities. Several franchises merged during World War II because many players were in the military. Few, if any, of these moves and mergers drew much controversy.

Franchise moves became far more controversial in the late 20th century when a vastly more popular NFL, free from financial instability, allowed many teams to leave to abandon long-held strongholds for perceived financially greener pastures.

In 1966, Pete Rozelle promised Congress that franchises would not move, a promise made to secure a law exempting the league from certain aspects of antitrust laws, thus making possible the AFL–NFL merger. Despite Rozelle's promise, several franchises have moved since the merger and the passage of the law (Public Law 89-800) that sanctioned it. While owners invariably cited financial difficulties as the primary factor in such moves, many fans bitterly disputed these contentions, especially in Baltimore, St. Louis, and Cleveland, each of which eventually received teams some years after their original franchises moved.

Los Angeles, the second-largest media market in the United States, did not have an NFL team from 1995 to 2015. The league had started promoting a return to Los Angeles no later than 2006, and in January 2016, the NFL gave the St. Louis Rams approval to move back to Los Angeles. A year later, the Chargers also moved to the city, while the Raiders moved to Las Vegas in 2020.

The San Diego–Tijuana market is currently the largest U.S. metropolitan area (and only one with over 3.2 million residents) without an NFL franchise. The only other city to be seriously considered in the country in recent times was San Antonio, Texas, which was examined by the Raiders in 2014 before they chose Las Vegas.

Speculation on future moves has mainly been centered around two cities outside the United States: Toronto, Canada (q.v. National Football League in Toronto) and London, England, United Kingdom (q.v. Potential London NFL franchise), the latter of which would be the first attempt by one of the major professional sports leagues in the United States and Canada to place a team outside North America.

In the 1970s, the suburbanization of the U.S. saw the construction of stadiums and other team facilities in the suburbs instead of the central city.

== Teams that have moved ==
The NFL considers these teams to be continuous franchises that have moved to a new metropolitan area.

The list includes franchises from the 1960s American Football League that moved during that league's existence. The NFL and AFL agreed to merge in 1966; the merger took effect in 1970. All AFL franchises were accepted into the NFL, and the NFL incorporated the AFL's history, records, and statistics. In chronological order:

- Decatur Staleys: to Chicago in 1921 (renamed the Chicago Bears in 1922)
- Toledo Maroons: to Kenosha, Wisconsin in 1924
- Cleveland Bulldogs: to Detroit as the Wolverines in 1928
- Pottsville Maroons: to Boston as the Bulldogs in 1929
- Dayton Triangles: to Brooklyn as the Dodgers in 1930 (renamed Brooklyn Tigers in 1944)
- Portsmouth Spartans: to Detroit as the Lions in 1934
- Boston Redskins: to Washington, D.C., in 1937 (renamed Washington Commanders in 2022)
- Cleveland Rams: to Los Angeles in 1946
- Chicago Cardinals: to St. Louis in 1960
- Los Angeles Chargers: to San Diego in 1961 (AFL)
- Dallas Texans: to Kansas City as the Chiefs in 1963 (AFL)
- Oakland Raiders: to Los Angeles in 1982
- Baltimore Colts: to Indianapolis in 1984
- St. Louis Cardinals: to Phoenix as the Phoenix Cardinals in 1988 (renamed Arizona Cardinals in 1994)
- Los Angeles Rams: to St. Louis in 1995
- Los Angeles Raiders: back to Oakland in 1995
- Houston Oilers: temporarily to Memphis in 1997 as the Tennessee Oilers and permanently to Nashville in 1998 (renamed Tennessee Titans in 1999)
- St. Louis Rams: back to Los Angeles in 2016
- San Diego Chargers: back to Los Angeles in 2017
- Oakland Raiders: to Las Vegas in 2020

== Quasi-moves: movement of intact teams from one city to another ==
The NFL considers these separate franchises with some continuity:

- Canton Bulldogs: mothballed for the 1924 NFL season when the owner of the Cleveland Bulldogs bought it and took the players and nickname to Cleveland. Franchise resurrected in 1925
- Cleveland Bulldogs: to Detroit, Michigan, in 1928 as the Detroit Wolverines
- Duluth Eskimos: to Orange, New Jersey, as the Orange Tornadoes in 1929 (separate teams but same franchise )
- Newark Tornadoes: The Newark franchise was forfeited to the league and ordered to be disposed of to the highest bidder after the 1930 season. With no takers, the league owned-and-operated Cleveland Indians of 1931 took the Tornadoes' place, which in turn was filled by the Boston Braves (now Washington Commanders franchise) in 1932. So, while it is possible that Newark or Cleveland franchise was sold to the Boston group in 1932, there is no documentation available. The Tornadoes themselves joined the minor-league American Association later in the 1930s and adopted the name Newark Bears.
- Philadelphia Eagles and Pittsburgh Steelers corporate entities and players (but not franchises) swap cities after the 1940 NFL season after complex ownership deal.
- Boston Yanks franchise to New York City as the New York Bulldogs in 1949 (separate franchise but same owner and players)
- New York Yanks (formerly New York Bulldogs) folded after the 1951 NFL season; players transferred to new Dallas Texans franchise for the 1952 NFL season
- Dallas Texans: operated out of Hershey, Pennsylvania, for the last five games of the 1952 NFL season, playing their last three games in Akron, Ohio. Franchise folded after season's end and players awarded to new Baltimore Colts franchise in 1953
- Owners of the Baltimore Colts and Los Angeles Rams traded franchises in 1972.
- Cleveland Browns: to Baltimore as the Ravens in 1996. In 1995, Browns owner Art Modell announced plans to move the Cleveland Browns to Baltimore for the 1996 NFL season. The NFL, the city of Cleveland and Modell reached an agreement whereby the Browns franchise and history would remain in Cleveland to be resurrected by 1999. Modell was given a new franchise for Baltimore, made up of players from the 1995 Cleveland Browns. For more information on this particular move, see Cleveland Browns relocation controversy.

== Franchise mergers ==
- The Detroit Tigers roster merged with the Buffalo All-Americans in November 1921.
- The Brooklyn Lions and Brooklyn Horsemen of the 1926 AFL played in the NFL for the rest of the 1926 season: this franchise was given to the AFL's New York Yankees in 1927.
- The Pittsburgh Steelers and Philadelphia Eagles merged to form the Phil-Pitt "Steagles" for the 1943 season due to the exodus of players during World War II. The team split their home games between Philadelphia and Pittsburgh.
- The Pittsburgh Steelers and Chicago Cardinals merged to form Card-Pitt, for the 1944 season due to the exodus of players during World War II. The team split their home games between Pittsburgh and Chicago.
- The Brooklyn Tigers (the same Brooklyn team that moved from Dayton in 1930) and Boston Yanks, merged initially for the 1945 season, as simply "The Yanks." The team split home games between Brooklyn and Boston. The merger became permanent, as the Boston Yanks, after the Brooklyn franchise moved in 1946.
- The Los Angeles Dons of the AAFC and Los Angeles Rams of the NFL merged after the 1949 season, shortly before the two leagues merged entirely.
- The Cleveland Browns and AAFC Buffalo Bills merged in 1950 after the Bills were denied entry into the NFL.
- The AAFC New York Yankees team name and six players merged with New York Bulldogs to form the New York Yanks, with rest of the team being absorbed by the New York Giants.

== Teams moving between cities/boroughs within same metropolitan area ==
Listed chronologically by team's first such move:

- Orange Tornadoes to nearby Newark, New Jersey, in 1930, renamed the Newark Tornadoes
- Oakland Raiders: from San Francisco to Oakland (Frank Youell Field, and later the Oakland Coliseum) in 1962
- St. Louis Cardinals: from the JeffVanderLou neighborhood (Busch Stadium I) to Downtown St. Louis (Busch Memorial Stadium) in 1966
- New York Giants: from Manhattan (Polo Grounds) to the Bronx (Yankee Stadium) in 1956, temporarily moved to New Haven, Connecticut (Yale Bowl) for the second half of the 1973 and the entire 1974 season, then temporarily moved to Queens (Shea Stadium) for the 1975 season, then permanently to East Rutherford, New Jersey (Giants Stadium/MetLife Stadium) in 1976
- Chicago Bears: from the Lake View community area (Wrigley Field) to the Near South Side community area (Soldier Field) in 1971
- Philadelphia Eagles: between three Philadelphia neighborhoods—North Philadelphia (Shibe Park) to University City (Franklin Field) in 1958, and then on to South Philadelphia (Veterans Stadium/Lincoln Financial Field) in 1971
- New York Jets: from Manhattan (Polo Grounds) to Queens (Shea Stadium) in 1964 and to East Rutherford, New Jersey (Giants Stadium/MetLife Stadium) in 1984
- Boston Patriots: from the Fenway-Kenmore neighborhood of Boston (Nickerson Field and Fenway Park) to Chestnut Hill, Massachusetts (Alumni Stadium) in 1969, to the Allston neighborhood of Boston (Harvard Stadium) in 1970, then permanently to Foxborough, Massachusetts in 1971 (Foxboro Stadium/Gillette Stadium) and renamed New England Patriots
- Pittsburgh Steelers: from the Pittsburgh neighborhood of Oakland (Forbes Field/Pitt Stadium) to the city's North Shore (Three Rivers Stadium/Heinz Field) in 1970
- San Francisco 49ers: from Golden Gate Park, San Francisco (Kezar Stadium) to the Hunters Point, San Francisco neighborhood (Candlestick Park) in 1971, and south to Santa Clara, California (Levi's Stadium) in 2014
- Dallas Cowboys: from Dallas (Cotton Bowl) to Irving, Texas (Texas Stadium) in 1971, to Arlington, Texas (AT&T Stadium) in 2009
- Kansas City Chiefs: from Brooklyn & E. 22nd (Municipal Stadium) to the Truman Sports Complex (Arrowhead Stadium) in 1972
- Buffalo Bills: to Orchard Park, New York (Highmark Stadium) in 1973
- Detroit Lions: to Pontiac, Michigan (Pontiac Silverdome) in 1975 and back to Detroit (Ford Field) in 2002
- New Orleans Saints: from Uptown New Orleans (Tulane Stadium) to the Central Business District (Superdome) in 1975
- Los Angeles Rams: to Anaheim, California (Anaheim Stadium) in 1980; after returning to Los Angeles in 2016, from Los Angeles proper (Los Angeles Memorial Coliseum) to Inglewood (SoFi Stadium) in 2020
- Minnesota Vikings: from suburban Bloomington (Metropolitan Stadium) to downtown Minneapolis (Metrodome) in 1982. Temporarily moved within Minneapolis to the University of Minnesota campus (TCF Bank Stadium) starting in 2014 before returning to the Metrodome site at U.S. Bank Stadium in 2016.
- Miami Dolphins: from the Little Havana neighborhood of Miami (Orange Bowl) to unincorporated northern Dade County (now the city of Miami Gardens) in 1987 (Hard Rock Stadium)
- Washington Redskins: from Washington, D.C. (RFK Stadium) to Landover, Maryland (Northwest Stadium) in 1997 (stadium's postal address was Raljon, Maryland until Redskins purchased by Daniel Snyder in 1999)
- Arizona Cardinals: from the eastern Phoenix suburb of Tempe (Sun Devil Stadium) to the western suburb of Glendale (State Farm Stadium) in 2006
- Los Angeles Chargers: after returning to the Los Angeles area in 2017, from the suburb of Carson (Dignity Health Sports Park) to join the Rams in Inglewood (SoFi Stadium) in 2020

== Temporary moves ==
These temporary moves, made while home stadiums were under construction or otherwise unavailable, are listed in chronological order:

- St. Louis Cardinals: On October 12, 1964, the Cardinals' scheduled home game vs. the Baltimore Colts was moved to Baltimore's Memorial Stadium because the baseball Cardinals were using Busch Stadium for the World Series.
- Boston Patriots: Played the 1969 season at Boston College's Alumni Stadium in Chestnut Hill and the 1970 season at Harvard Stadium before Schaefer Stadium opened in 1971.
- Atlanta Falcons: The Falcons' October 5, 1969, home game vs. the Colts was shifted from Atlanta Stadium to Grant Field at Georgia Tech because the Atlanta Braves were hosting the New York Mets in the 1969 National League Championship Series .
- Minnesota Vikings: On October 5, 1969, the Vikings' matchup with the Green Bay Packers was moved from Metropolitan Stadium to Memorial Stadium at the University of Minnesota because of a 1969 American League Championship Series game between the Minnesota Twins and Baltimore Orioles.
- Chicago Bears: Played September 27, 1970, game vs. Philadelphia Eagles at Dyche Stadium at Northwestern University because games played after the AFL–NFL merger were required to take place in stadiums that could seat at least 50,000. After the city of Evanston, Illinois and Big Ten Conference rejected the Bears request to playing further games at Northwestern, they returned to Wrigley Field, which seated 47,000, for the remainder of 1970. The Bears moved to Soldier Field in 1971.
- Oakland Raiders: On September 23, 1973, the Raiders' game vs. the Miami Dolphins was moved to California Memorial Stadium in Berkeley, home of the University of California Golden Bears, because the Oakland Athletics baseball team was to host the Minnesota Twins at the Oakland Coliseum on September 24.
- New York Jets: The Jets' October 21, 1973, home game vs. the Pittsburgh Steelers was moved to Three Rivers Stadium due to the New York Mets' participation in that season's World Series. Even though the Mets' last home game in the World Series was on Thursday, October 18 (Game 5), the contract between New York City, the Mets and Jets required the stadium be available for the Mets until the conclusion of their season. Game 7 of the World Series, on October 21, was at the Oakland-Alameda County Coliseum.
- New York Giants: The Giants played their home games at the Yale Bowl for most of 1973 and all of 1974, and in Shea Stadium in 1975 while Giants Stadium was under construction. The Giants left Yankee Stadium after week two of the 1973 season, when the stadium in The Bronx closed for two years of renovations.
- San Francisco 49ers: On October 22, 1989, the 49ers' home game vs. the New England Patriots was played at Stanford Stadium, home of the Stanford University Cardinal (and the site of Super Bowl XIX five years earlier), due to the Loma Prieta earthquake in northern California.
- St. Louis Rams: played the first half of their inaugural 1995 season in St. Louis at Busch Stadium while construction of Trans World Dome was completed.
- Carolina Panthers: The Panthers began play in 1995 but spent their first season at Memorial Stadium in Clemson, South Carolina as their new stadium in Charlotte, North Carolina was still under construction.
- Seattle Seahawks: Played three games in 1994 at Husky Stadium as the Kingdome was undergoing emergency repairs, and returned there for the entire 2000 and 2001 seasons before Seahawks Stadium (now Lumen Field) was completed.
- Chicago Bears: Spent the 2002 season at Memorial Stadium in Champaign, Illinois while Soldier Field was being renovated.
- San Diego Chargers: On October 27, 2003, the Chargers' home game vs. the Miami Dolphins was played at Sun Devil Stadium, then the home of the Arizona Cardinals, due to the Cedar Fire in southern California.
- New Orleans Saints: Due to extensive damage to the Louisiana Superdome, their home stadium, as a result of Hurricane Katrina, the Saints played three home games of the 2005 season in the Alamodome in San Antonio, Texas, where the team set up temporary operations, as well as four home games at Tiger Stadium in Baton Rouge, Louisiana (and, officially, one at Giants Stadium in East Rutherford, New Jersey). The Saints returned to New Orleans in 2006. See also Effect of Hurricane Katrina on the New Orleans Saints. The Saints later returned to Giants Stadium in 2005, defeating the Jets 19–17 on November 27.
- Minnesota Vikings:
  - The roof of the Metrodome collapsed from heavy snowfall and high winds on December 12, 2010, forcing the Vikings' home game against the New York Giants to be postponed and played on Monday, December 13 at Ford Field in Detroit. Minnesota's next home game was moved to TCF Bank Stadium on the campus of the University of Minnesota while repairs to the roof took place.
  - The Vikings returned to TCF Bank Stadium for the 2014 and 2015 seasons after the Metrodome was demolished and U.S. Bank Stadium was being built on that site.
- Buffalo Bills:
  - Due to a severe snow storm in late November 2014, the Buffalo Bills' home game against the New York Jets in week 12 was moved to Ford Field in Detroit. It was also postponed from Sunday, November 23 to Monday, November 24, with local markets showing the game on CBS: the Bills had already played in Detroit in 2014, defeating the Lions, 17–14, on October 5.
  - Another severe snowstorm in November 2022 forced the Bills' home game vs. the Browns in week 11 to be moved to Detroit, but remained on Sunday, November 20. The Bills won 31–23.
- San Francisco 49ers: Due to the COVID-19 pandemic, Santa Clara County banned contact sports from November 30, 2020, to January 8, 2021. As such, the 49ers played their final 3 home games of the 2020 season at State Farm Stadium in Glendale, Arizona.
- New Orleans Saints: Due to 2021's Hurricane Ida, the Saints played their week 1 home game at EverBank Stadium in Jacksonville, Florida where they beat the Green Bay Packers 38–3.
- Los Angeles Rams: Due to the January 2025 Southern California wildfires, the Rams played their first playoff game in the 2024–25 NFL playoffs at State Farm Stadium in Glendale, Arizona where they beat the Minnesota Vikings 27–9.

== Ultimate disposition of the 15 charter franchises ==
By the start of the 1920 APFA season, the nascent National Football League was composed of 15 franchises. Of those teams, only two are still in operation as of 2025 (denoted in bold):

- Akron Pros: Changed name to Akron Indians in 1926, but shut down in 1927.
- Buffalo All-Americans: Changed name to Buffalo Bisons in 1924, Buffalo Rangers in 1926, and changed back to Buffalo Bisons in 1927 before suspending operations halfway through 1927. They resumed play in 1929, but folded after the season. City is currently represented by the Buffalo Bills, a charter member of the American Football League in 1960.
- Canton Bulldogs: Cleveland Bulldogs in 1923, but suspended operations in 1924, resuming play in Canton in 1925 before folding after the 1926 season. The city is currently represented by the preseason Pro Football Hall of Fame Game.
- Chicago Cardinals: Merged with Pittsburgh Steelers for one year in 1944, returned as an independent team in 1945. Moved to St. Louis in 1960, and to Phoenix in 1988. Changed name to Arizona Cardinals in 1994.
- Chicago Tigers: Folded after the 1920 season. (The story that the Tigers lost a winner-take-all game to the Cardinals for the "rights" to Chicago is now considered a myth.)
- Cleveland Tigers: Folded after the 1921 season. City is currently represented by the Cleveland Browns.
- Columbus Panhandles: Changed name to Columbus Tigers in 1923, folded after the 1926 season.
- Dayton Triangles: Moved to Brooklyn as Brooklyn Dodgers in 1930, changed name to Brooklyn Tigers in 1944. Merged with Boston Yanks in 1945, but folded after 1945 season. Through successor franchises, the current Indianapolis Colts can trace their lineage to the Triangles.
- Decatur Staleys: Moved to Chicago in 1921, changed name to Chicago Bears in 1922.
- Detroit Heralds: Changed name to "Tigers" and folded in the middle of the 1921 season, sending its players to Buffalo. City currently represented by the Detroit Lions.
- Hammond Pros: Folded after the 1926 season.
- Massillon Tigers: Represented at the September 17, 1920, meeting by Ralph Hay but never played in the league and are only counted as a charter member on a technicality.
- Muncie Flyers: Folded after the 1921 season.
- Rochester Jeffersons: Suspended operations after the 1925 season, and folded in 1928.
- Rock Island Independents: Left the NFL and became an independent team after the 1924 season. Joined the first American Football League in 1926, but folded before end of the season.

== See also ==
- Timeline of the National Football League
- Defunct NFL franchises

== Bibliography ==
- Official 2005 National Football League Record and Fact Book. New York: Time Inc. Home Entertainment. (2005). ISBN 1-932994-36-X
- Carroll, Bob; with Gershman, Michael, Neft, David, and Thorn, John (1999). Total Football:The Official Encyclopedia of the National Football League. New York: HarperCollins. ISBN 0-06-270174-6
- McDonough, Will (1994). 75 Seasons: The Complete Story of the National Football League. Atlanta: Turner Publishing, Inc. ISBN 1-57036-056-1
- Peterson, Robert W. (1997). Pigskin: The Early Years of Pro Football. New York: Oxford University Press. ISBN 0-19-507607-9
- Willis, Chris (2010). The Man Who Built the National Football League: Joe F. Carr. Lanham, Maryland: Scarecrow Press, Inc. ISBN 978-0-8108-7669-9
