= 1928 Chicago Cardinals season =

American football team season

- Head coach: Fred Gillies
- Home stadium: Normal Park

Results
- Record: 1–5
- League place: 9th NFL

The 1928 Chicago Cardinals season was their ninth in the National Football League. The team failed to improve on their previous output of 3–7–1, winning only one game. They finished ninth in the league.

The team scored only 7 points during the season, 6 on a single touchdown on an interception by Hal Erickson against the Dayton Triangles. Jim Thorpe also played one game (his last) for this team.

== Schedule ==
| Game | Date | Opponent | Result | Record |
|---|---|---|---|---|
| 1 | September 23 | Chicago Bears | L 0–15 | 0–1 |
| 2 | October 7 | Dayton Triangles | W 7–0 | 1–1 |
| 3 | October 14 | at Green Bay Packers | L 0–20 | 1–2 |
| 4 | November 24 | at Frankford Yellow Jackets | L 0–19 | 1–3 |
| 5 | November 25 | at New York Yankees | L 0–19 | 1–4 |
| 6 | November 29 | at Chicago Bears | L 0–34 | 1–5 |

== Standings ==
NFL standings
| | W | L | T | PCT | PF | PA | STK |
|---|---|---|---|---|---|---|---|
| Providence Steam Roller | 8 | 1 | 2 | .889 | 128 | 42 | T1 |
| Frankford Yellow Jackets | 11 | 3 | 2 | .786 | 175 | 84 | W2 |
| Detroit Wolverines | 7 | 2 | 1 | .778 | 189 | 76 | W4 |
| Green Bay Packers | 6 | 4 | 3 | .600 | 120 | 92 | W1 |
| Chicago Bears | 7 | 5 | 1 | .583 | 182 | 85 | L2 |
| New York Giants | 4 | 7 | 2 | .364 | 79 | 136 | L5 |
| New York Yankees | 4 | 8 | 1 | .333 | 103 | 179 | W1 |
| Pottsville Maroons | 2 | 8 | 0 | .200 | 74 | 134 | L1 |
| Chicago Cardinals | 1 | 5 | 0 | .167 | 7 | 107 | L4 |
| Dayton Triangles | 0 | 7 | 0 | .000 | 9 | 131 | L7 |

Note: Tie games were not officially counted in the standings until 1972.
