= 1928 New York Giants season =

NFL team 4th season

- Head coach: Earl Potteiger
- Home stadium: Polo Grounds

Results
- Record: 4–7–2
- League place: 6th NFL

The 1928 New York Giants season was the franchise's 4th season in the National Football League. The team finished a disappointing sixth with a 4–7–2 record after winning the NFL title in 1927. The Giants played two games against the Detroit Wolverines and failed to win either one (a 28–0 loss in Detroit and a 19–19 tie at the Polo Grounds); at season's end, Giants owner Tim Mara bought the entire Detroit franchise (mostly to secure the services of star tailback Benny Friedman) and merged the two clubs under the Giants' name.

== Schedule ==
Week	Date	Opponent	Result	Record	Attendance	Venue	Recap	Sources
1	Bye							
2	September 30	at Pottsville Maroons	W 12–6	1–0	3,000	Minersville Park	Recap	
3	October 7	at Green Bay Packers	W 6–0	2–0	7,000	City Stadium	Recap	
4	October 14	at Chicago Bears	L 0–13	2–1	15,000	Wrigley Field	Recap	
5	October 21	at Detroit Wolverines	L 0–28	2–2	12,000	University of Detroit Stadium	Recap	
6	October 28	at New York Yankees	W 10–7	3–2	25,000	Yankee Stadium	Recap	
7	November 4	Frankford Yellow Jackets	T 0–0	3–2–1		Polo Grounds	Recap	
7	November 6	Pottsville Maroons	W 13–7	4–2–1		Polo Grounds	Recap	
8	November 11	Detroit Wolverines	T 19–19	4–2–2	30,000	Polo Grounds	Recap	
9	November 18	Green Bay Packers	L 0–7	4–3–2	25,000	Polo Grounds	Recap	
10	November 25	at Providence Steam Roller	L 0–16	4–4–2	13,000	Cycledrome	Recap	
11	December 2	New York Yankees	L 13–19	4–5–2		Polo Grounds	Recap	
12	December 8	at Frankford Yellow Jackets	L 0–7	4–6–2		Frankford Stadium	Recap	
13	December 16	at New York Yankees	L 6–7	4–7–2		Yankee Stadium	Recap	

== Standings ==
NFL standings
	W	L	T	PCT	PF	PA	STK
Providence Steam Roller	8	1	2	.889	128	42	T1
Frankford Yellow Jackets	11	3	2	.786	175	84	W2
Detroit Wolverines	7	2	1	.778	189	76	W4
Green Bay Packers	6	4	3	.600	120	92	W1
Chicago Bears	7	5	1	.583	182	85	L2
New York Giants	4	7	2	.364	79	136	L5
New York Yankees	4	8	1	.333	103	179	W1
Pottsville Maroons	2	8	0	.200	74	134	L1
Chicago Cardinals	1	5	0	.167	7	107	L4
Dayton Triangles	0	7	0	.000	9	131	L7

Note: Tie games were not officially counted in the standings until 1972.

== See also ==
- List of New York Giants seasons
