= Len Sedbrook =

No. 14
- Position: Halfback

Personal information
- Born: January 13, 1905; Goltry, Oklahoma, U.S.
- Died: April 22, 1986 (aged 81); Oklahoma City, Oklahoma, U.S.
- Listed height: 5 ft 10 in (1.78 m)
- Listed weight: 174 lb (79 kg)

Career information
- High school: Goltry (Goltry, Oklahoma)
- College: Phillips (1924–1927)

Career history
- New York Giants (1928)*; Detroit Wolverines (1928); New York Giants (1929–1931)
- * Offseason or practice squad member only

Career statistics
- Touchdowns: 25 or 28 (Note: Sources conflict.)
- Stats at Pro Football Reference

Leonard Roy Sedbrook (January 13, 1905 – April 22, 1986) was an American professional football halfback. He played four seasons in the National Football League (NFL) for the Detroit Wolverines and New York Giants and jointly led the league in touchdowns along with Ernie Nevers in 1929.

== Early life ==
Sedbrook was born on January 13, 1905, in Goltry, Oklahoma. He grew up competing in multiple sports, including football, basketball, baseball, and track, and attended Goltry High School. In baseball, he was a member of the Enid Harvesters minor league team in 1924, appearing at center field and pitcher. Sedbrook enrolled at Phillips University in Enid, where he became a top player for the football, basketball and baseball teams. He played football from 1924 to 1927. In 1925, he was a second-team all-state selection and reported in The Enid Daily Eagle to be "without a doubt" one of their top two stars. Sedbrook was described as "one of the best broken field runners" in the Oklahoma Intercollegiate Conference.

Sedbrook captained the 1925–26 Phillips basketball team after their original captain did not report. He helped them to their first conference title in basketball and afterwards was re-elected captain for the following season. He also was named second-team all-conference and third-team all-state for the 1926 football season. He repeated as an all-state football selection in 1927, then played a final season with the basketball team in 1927–28. In his last football season, Sedbrook "almost single-handedly" led Phillips to a defeat of the Tulsa Golden Hurricane, the latter's only loss of the year, and which prevented them from winning the state title. One local paper described him as "one of the most versatile athletes that ever wore the colors of Phillips". After leaving school, Sedbrook began working for the Comar Oil Company and signed with their baseball team, the Comar Oilers, in 1928. He also spent time with the Enid Independents.

== Professional career ==
=== Detroit Wolverines ===
After college, Sedbrook signed to play professional football for the New York Giants of the National Football League (NFL), but was sold to the Detroit Wolverines in August 1928, before the regular season. In the first exhibition game of the season, he scored a 55-yard rushing touchdown. During the regular season, Sedbrook served as one of the Wolverines' backs and saw significant action as a runner. He helped the Wolverines win their first three games of the season, after which they were defeated for the first time by the Frankford Yellow Jackets.

Against the Yellow Jackets, Sedbrook scored his first NFL touchdown and his team's only score of the game, returning an interception 61 yards for the touchdown. He later was one of the team's stars in a 13–0 win against the New York Yankees, catching a 35-yard touchdown pass from Benny Friedman and catching a 25-yard pass to set up another touchdown; the Detroit Free Press commented that "Friedman and Sedbrook were almost the whole show ... Sedbrook [was] here, there and everywhere on the field, intercepted passes thrown by Red Smith and Wild Bill Kelly or snared those thrown by his team-mates". The Wolverines won their last four games of the season to finish with a record of 7–2–1, 3rd place in the NFL. Sedbrook scored one rushing touchdown and one other receiving touchdown during the season; Pro Football Reference credits him with one other touchdown, for five total, while Pro Football Archives lists him with four on the year. He was third on the team in scoring and had their only interception return touchdown of the season. After the season, Sedbrook appeared for an NFL all-star team that defeated the Hominy Indians 27–0, and he posted two touchdowns in the game.

An article about Sedbrook's first professional season in The Enid Morning News said, "Sedbrook, Haymaker back, who is doing good work in professional football this year, tells the Enid boys that they sure sock you in the big time circuits. Sometimes, says Sedbrook, they open a hole purposely, hoping that the back will step into it. Sedbrook makes his yardage in a broken field principally, but declares they sure know how to tackle."
