= 1928 Detroit Wolverines season =

National Football League team season

- Head coach: LeRoy Andrews

Results
- Record: 7–2–1
- League place: 3rd NFL

The 1928 Detroit Wolverines season was their first and only season in the league, after relocating from Cleveland in the offseason. The team went 7–2–1, finishing third in the league; their two losses came to Frankford and Providence, the NFL's top two teams.

== History ==
NFL Hall of Fame quarterback Benny Friedman was the star of the 1928 Detroit Wolverines. Friedman was a pioneer passing quarterback.

As one of the centers of American manufacturing, Detroit was regarded as a promising location for a stable professional football franchise by the fledgling National Football League (NFL). The league awarded its first Detroit franchise to Jimmy Conzelman on August 1, 1925.

The Wolverines, led by former University of Michigan star quarterback Benny Friedman, also met the New York Giants twice: an easy 28-0 win in Detroit and a 19-19 tie at the Polo Grounds in New York.

Ironically, this proved to be the team's downfall, as the Wolverines piqued the interest of Giants owner Tim Mara, who wanted to acquire Friedman and Detroit's other star players. Mara did so by buying the entire Detroit franchise, and promptly shutting it down, thus delivering Friedman et al to New York.

The NFL would not return to the Motor City until 1934, when the Portsmouth Spartans moved to Detroit and were rebranded as the Lions.

Tiny Feather (#20) carries the ball towards the end zone in the Detroit Wolverines season-opening victory over the New York Yankees, October 14, 1928.

== Schedule ==
Game	Date	Opponent	Result	Record	Venue	Attendance	Recap	Sources
1	October 14	at New York Yankees	W 35–12	1–0	Yankee Stadium	18,000	Recap	
2	October 21	New York Giants	W 28–0	2–0	Dinan Field	12,000	Recap	
3	October 28	at Chicago Bears	W 6–0	3–0	Wrigley Field	20,000	Recap	
4	November 3	at Frankford Yellow Jackets	L 7–25	3–1	Frankford Stadium	8,000	Recap	
5	November 4	at Providence Steam Roller	L 0–7	3–2	Cycledrome	8,500	Recap	
6	November 11	at New York Giants	T 19–19	3–2–1	Polo Grounds	30,000	Recap	
7	November 18	New York Yankees	W 13–0	4–2–1	Dinan Field	8,000	Recap	
8	November 25	at Chicago Bears	W 14–7	5–2–1	Wrigley Field	15,000	Recap	
9	November 29	Dayton Triangles	W 33–0	6–2–1	Dinan Field		Recap	
10	December 9	at New York Yankees	W 34–6	7–2–1	Yankee Stadium	3,000	Recap	

== Game summaries ==
=== Game 1: at New York Yankees ===
Yankee Stadium was the scene and 2:30 pm was the time for the October 14 franchise debut of the Detroit Wolverines as they faced C. C. Pyle's New York Yankees. Gibby Welch, "Wild Bill" Kelly, and Bo Molenda were among those Yankees receiving top billing in the battle against former University of Michigan star Benny Friedman. An impressive crowd of 18,000 made their way to the stadium, joined by a region radio audience listening to the live sideline broadcasts of two competing stations.

== Standings ==
Print ad for the November 18 game with the New York Yankees in Detroit. "Eight thousand shivering fans" turned up, according to one news account.

NFL standings
	W	L	T	PCT	PF	PA	STK
Providence Steam Roller	8	1	2	.889	128	42	T1
Frankford Yellow Jackets	11	3	2	.786	175	84	W2
Detroit Wolverines	7	2	1	.778	189	76	W4
Green Bay Packers	6	4	3	.600	120	92	W1
Chicago Bears	7	5	1	.583	182	85	L2
New York Giants	4	7	2	.364	79	136	L5
New York Yankees	4	8	1	.333	103	179	W1
Pottsville Maroons	2	8	0	.200	74	134	L1
Chicago Cardinals	1	5	0	.167	7	107	L4
Dayton Triangles	0	7	0	.000	9	131	L7

Note: Tie games were not officially counted in the standings until 1972.

== Roster ==
Starters

LE - Lyle Munn (Kansas State)
LT - Tom Cobb (St. John's)
LG - Les Caywood (St. John's)
C - Joe Wostoupal (Nebraska)
RG - Dosey Howard (Marietta College)
RT - Bill Owen (Oklahoma A&M, Phillips)
RE - Carl Bacchus (Missouri)

QB - Benny Friedman (Michigan) †

LH - Rex Thomas (St. John's)
RH - Ossie Wiberg (Nebraska Wesleyan)
FB - Tiny Feather (Kansas State)

Reserves

- Rip Bachor, tackle (University of Detroit)
- John Barrett, lineman (University of Detroit)
- Pete Jackson, back (Missouri)
- Proc Randels, end (Kansas State)
- Eddie Scharer, back (University of Detroit, Notre Dame)
- Len Sedbrook, halfback (Phillips)
- Ernie Vick, lineman (Michigan)
- Chet Widerquist, lineman (Northwestern, Washington & Jefferson)

† - Denotes NFL Hall of Fame member.
