= 1928 Pottsville Maroons season =

National Football League team season

- Head coach: Pete Henry
- Home stadium: Minersville Park

Results
- Record: 4–10 Overall; 2–8 NFL
- League place: 8th NFL

The 1928 Pottsville Maroons season was their fourth in the league and their last before changing their name to the Boston Bulldogs. The team failed to improve on their previous league output of 5–8, winning only two games. They finished eighth in the league.

== Schedule ==
| Week | Date | Opponent | Result | Attendance | Venue | Sources |
|---|---|---|---|---|---|---|
| – | September 23 | "Harrisburg Collegians" | W 67–0 | 2,500 | Minersville Park | |
| 1 | September 30 | New York Giants | L 6–12 | 3,000 | Minersville Park | |
| 2 | October 7 | New York Yankees | W 9–7 | | Minersville Park | |
| – | October 14 | Millville Big Blue | W 14–0 | | Minersville Park | |
| – | October 21 | at Canton Rogers Jewelers | L 6–18 | | | |
| 3 | October 28 | at Providence Steam Roller | L 6–13 | 8,000 | Cycledrome | |
| 4 | November 4 | at Green Bay Packers | L 14–26 | | | |
| 5 | November 6 | at New York Giants | L 7–13 | | Polo Grounds | |
| 6 | November 10 | at Frankford Yellow Jackets | L 0–19 | | Frankford Stadium | |
| 7 | November 11 | Frankford Yellow Jackets | L 0–24 | | Minersville Park | |
| 8 | November 18 | at Chicago Bears | L 6–13 | | | |
| 9 | November 25 | Green Bay Packers | W 26–0 | | Minersville Park | |
| 10 | November 29 | Providence Steam Roller | L 0–7 | 10,000 | Minersville Park | |
| – | December 2 | at Staten Island Stapletons | L 6–15 | | | |

== Standings ==
NFL standings
| | W | L | T | PCT | PF | PA | STK |
|---|---|---|---|---|---|---|---|
| Providence Steam Roller | 8 | 1 | 2 | .889 | 128 | 42 | T1 |
| Frankford Yellow Jackets | 11 | 3 | 2 | .786 | 175 | 84 | W2 |
| Detroit Wolverines | 7 | 2 | 1 | .778 | 189 | 76 | W4 |
| Green Bay Packers | 6 | 4 | 3 | .600 | 120 | 92 | W1 |
| Chicago Bears | 7 | 5 | 1 | .583 | 182 | 85 | L2 |
| New York Giants | 4 | 7 | 2 | .364 | 79 | 136 | L5 |
| New York Yankees | 4 | 8 | 1 | .333 | 103 | 179 | W1 |
| Pottsville Maroons | 2 | 8 | 0 | .200 | 74 | 134 | L1 |
| Chicago Cardinals | 1 | 5 | 0 | .167 | 7 | 107 | L4 |
| Dayton Triangles | 0 | 7 | 0 | .000 | 9 | 131 | L7 |

Note: Tie games were not officially counted in the standings until 1972.
