= 1928 Providence Steam Roller season =

National Football League team season

- Head coach: Jimmy Conzelman

Results
- Record: 8–1–2
- League place: 1st NFL

The 1928 Providence Steam Roller season was their fourth in the league. The team improved on their previous season's output of 8–5–1, losing only one game. As the team with the best win percentage, the Providence Steam Rollers won the 1928 NFL championship. The Providence Steam Roller is the last currently defunct NFL franchise to win a championship.

== Schedule ==
| Game | Date | Opponent | Result | Record | Attendance | Venue | Sources |
|---|---|---|---|---|---|---|---|
| 1 | September 30 | New York Yankees | W 20–7 | 1–0 | 5,000 | Cycledrome | |
| 2 | October 7 | Frankford Yellow Jackets | L 6–10 | 1–1 | 8,000 | Cycledrome | |
| 3 | October 14 | Dayton Triangles | W 28–0 | 2–1 | 7,000 | Cycledrome | |
| 4 | October 21 | at New York Yankees | W 12–6 | 3–1 | 8,000 | Yankee Stadium | |
| 5 | October 28 | Pottsville Maroons | W 13–6 | 4–1 | 8,000 | Cycledrome | |
| 6 | November 4 | Detroit Wolverines | W 7–0 | 5–1 | 8,500 | Cycledrome | |
| 7 | November 17 | at Frankford Yellow Jackets | T 6–6 | 5–1–1 | 15,000 | Frankford Stadium | |
| 8 | November 18 | Frankford Yellow Jackets | W 6–0 | 6–1–1 | 12,000 | Cycledrome | |
| 9 | November 25 | New York Giants | W 16–0 | 7–1–1 | 13,000 | Cycledrome | |
| 10 | November 29 | at Pottsville Maroons | W 7–0 | 8–1–1 | 10,000 | Minersville Park | |
| 11 | December 2 | Green Bay Packers | T 7–7 | 8–1–2 | 10,500 | Cycledrome | |

== Standings ==
NFL standings
| | W | L | T | PCT | PF | PA | STK |
|---|---|---|---|---|---|---|---|
| Providence Steam Roller | 8 | 1 | 2 | .889 | 128 | 42 | T1 |
| Frankford Yellow Jackets | 11 | 3 | 2 | .786 | 175 | 84 | W2 |
| Detroit Wolverines | 7 | 2 | 1 | .778 | 189 | 76 | W4 |
| Green Bay Packers | 6 | 4 | 3 | .600 | 120 | 92 | W1 |
| Chicago Bears | 7 | 5 | 1 | .583 | 182 | 85 | L2 |
| New York Giants | 4 | 7 | 2 | .364 | 79 | 136 | L5 |
| New York Yankees | 4 | 8 | 1 | .333 | 103 | 179 | W1 |
| Pottsville Maroons | 2 | 8 | 0 | .200 | 74 | 134 | L1 |
| Chicago Cardinals | 1 | 5 | 0 | .167 | 7 | 107 | L4 |
| Dayton Triangles | 0 | 7 | 0 | .000 | 9 | 131 | L7 |

Note: Tie games were not officially counted in the standings until 1972.
