= Tiny Feather =

American football player (1902–1965)

No. 9, 20, 8, 29
- Position: Running back

Personal information
- Born: February 23, 1902; Culver, Kansas, U.S.
- Died: July 15, 1965 (aged 63); Goodland, Kansas, U.S.
- Listed height: 6 ft 0 in (1.83 m)
- Listed weight: 197 lb (89 kg)

Career information
- College: Kansas State

Career history
- Cleveland Bulldogs (1927); Detroit Wolverines (1928); New York Giants (1929–1930); Staten Island Stapletons (1931); New York Giants (1931–1933); Cincinnati Reds (1934)

Career statistics
- Games played: 86
- Starts: 69
- Touchdowns: 10; Other statistics incomplete
- Stats at Pro Football Reference

Elwin Elton "Tiny" Feather (February 23, 1902 – July 15, 1965) was an American professional football player who played running back for eight seasons for the Cleveland Bulldogs, Detroit Wolverines, New York Giants, Staten Island Stapletons, and Cincinnati Reds. A single wing fullback and blocking back (i.e. quarterback), Feather scored 10 touchdowns in a National Football League (NFL) career that spanned seven seasons.

== Biography ==
Feather (#9 here) as part of the 1925 Kansas State team.

Feather was a single wing fullback at Kansas State Agricultural College (today's Kansas State University), earning his first varsity letter as a sophomore in 1924. The Aggies finished with a record of 1–4–1 in the Missouri Valley Conference for the 1924 season — in 8th place out of nine teams.

In 1925, Feather's junior season at Kansas State, the team took a step forward, outscoring their opponents 70 to 43, en route to a tie for third place in the Missouri Valley Conference.

Feather also played for the Aggies as a senior in 1926.

He finally earned a degree from Kansas State in 1932.

Tiny Feather (#20) carries the ball towards the end zone in a Detroit Wolverines victory over the New York Yankees, October 14, 1928.

Feather began playing football professionally in 1927 for the Cleveland Bulldogs of the National Football League (NFL). He would go on to play for a series of teams in the struggling league, including the New York Giants (1929–30, 1931–33), Staten Island Stapletons (1931), and the Cincinnati Reds (1934).

After leaving the NFL, Feather worked as a farmer in Sherman County, Kansas.

Feather died July 15, 1965, at Goodland, Kansas, of a heart attack. He was 63 years old at the time of his death.
