= Rip Bachor =

American football player (1901–1959)

Profile
- Position: Tackle

Personal information
- Born: December 10, 1901; Calumet, Michigan, U.S.
- Died: December 11, 1959 (aged 58); Lansing, Michigan, U.S.
- Listed height: 6 ft 0 in (1.83 m)
- Listed weight: 215 lb (98 kg)

Career information
- High school: Western (Detroit, Michigan)
- College: Detroit

Career history
- Detroit Wolverines (1928)

Awards and highlights
- First-team All-American (1925)
- Stats at Pro Football Reference

Ludwig Aloysius "Rip" Bachor (December 10, 1901 – December 11, 1959) was an American professional football player who was a tackle in the National Football League (NFL) for the Detroit Wolverines during the 1928 NFL season.

Bachor was born in Calumet, Michigan, in 1901. He attended Western High School in Detroit before enrolling at the University of Detroit. He played college football at the tackle position for the Detroit Titans football team from 1923 to 1926. He was selected by Herbert Reed as a first-team player on the 1925 College Football All-America Team. He was elected president of the school's "D" club in 1926.

After his football career, Bachor received a law degree from the University of Detroit in 1927. He worked as prosecutor and later an employment manager for the Utica-Bend Corporation, a labor relations executive with Studebaker-Packar, and finally in the legal department of the Michigan highway department. He died of a heart attack in 1959 at age 58 at his home in Lansing, Michigan.
