= 1928 Chicago Bears season =

NFL team season

- Owner: George S. Halas, Dutch Sternaman
- Head coach: George Halas
- Home stadium: Wrigley Field

Results
- Record: 7–5–1
- League place: 5th NFL

The 1928 season was the Chicago Bears' 9th in the National Football League. The team was unable to improve on their 9–3–2 record from 1927 and finished with a 7–5–1 record under head coach George Halas, earning them a fifth-place finish in the team standings. Despite playing ten of their thirteen games at home, this marked the team's worst record to date.

The season had its high points, including two shutout wins over the crosstown rival Chicago Cardinals, a shutout win over the defending champion New York Giants, and convincing victories over Frankford, Dayton, and Pottsville. However, two losses each to Detroit and the Green Bay Packers made in 1928 a disappointment to the normally contending Bears. Chicago's problem was that the old guard was aging with Joey Sternaman, Paddy Driscoll, and George Halas, who also played, were now in their early 30s.

The pace of playing 3 games in 8 days around Thanksgiving was at the time a standard practice. The Thanksgiving game was not a substitute for the Sunday game but just an extra game which also hurt the veteran Bears down the stretch as in previous years.

Joe Sternaman and William Senn starred on offense with 4 and 5 touchdowns each. Sternaman also shared kicking duties with Driscoll. The passing game became more important and the Bears scored 11 touchdowns on the air, versus 13 on the ground. This was a league-wide trend, foreshadowing the ascendancy of Don Hutson and Sammy Baugh of the 1930s.

== Future Hall of Fame players ==
- Paddy Driscoll, back
- George Halas, end
- Link Lyman, tackle
- George Trafton, center

== Other leading players ==
- William Senn, back
- Ed Sternaman, back
- Joe Sternaman, quarterback
- Laurie Walquist, quarterback

== Players departed from 1927 ==
- Ed Healey, tackle (retired)

== Schedule ==
Game	Date	Opponent	Result	Record	Attendance	Venue	Recap	Sources
1	September 23	Chicago Cardinals	W 15–0	1–0	4,000	Normal Park	Recap	
2	September 30	at Green Bay Packers	T 12–12	1–0–1	8,500	Green Bay City Stadium	Recap	
—	October 7	at Minneapolis Marines	W 12–6	—	"capacity"	DePaul Field		
3	October 14	New York Giants	W 13–0	2–0–1	15,000	Wrigley Field	Recap	
4	October 21	Green Bay Packers	L 6–16	2–1–1	15,000	Wrigley Field	Recap	
5	October 28	Detroit Wolverines	L 0–6	2–2–1	20,000	Wrigley Field	Recap	
6	November 4	New York Yankees	W 27–0	3–2–1	10,000	Wrigley Field	Recap	
7	November 11	Dayton Triangles	W 27–0	4–2–1	5,000	Wrigley Field	Recap	
8	November 18	Pottsville Maroons	W 13–6	5–2–1	5,000	Wrigley Field	Recap	
9	November 25	Detroit Wolverines	L 7–14	5–3–1	15,000	Wrigley Field	Recap	
10	November 29	Chicago Cardinals	W 34–0	6–3–1	10,000	Wrigley Field	Recap	
11	December 2	Frankford Yellow Jackets	W 28–6	7–3–1	12,000	Wrigley Field	Recap	
12	December 9	Green Bay Packers	L 0–6	7–4–1	14,000	Wrigley Field	Recap	
13	December 15	at Frankford Yellow Jackets	L 0–19	7–5–1	7,000	Frankford Stadium	Recap	

== Standings ==
NFL standings
	W	L	T	PCT	PF	PA	STK
Providence Steam Roller	8	1	2	.889	128	42	T1
Frankford Yellow Jackets	11	3	2	.786	175	84	W2
Detroit Wolverines	7	2	1	.778	189	76	W4
Green Bay Packers	6	4	3	.600	120	92	W1
Chicago Bears	7	5	1	.583	182	85	L2
New York Giants	4	7	2	.364	79	136	L5
New York Yankees	4	8	1	.333	103	179	W1
Pottsville Maroons	2	8	0	.200	74	134	L1
Chicago Cardinals	1	5	0	.167	7	107	L4
Dayton Triangles	0	7	0	.000	9	131	L7

Note: Tie games were not officially counted in the standings until 1972.
