= 1928 Frankford Yellow Jackets season =

National Football League team season

- Head coach: Ed Weir
- Home stadium: Frankford Stadium

Results
- Record: 11–3–2 (NFL) (16–3–2 Overall)
- League place: 2nd NFL

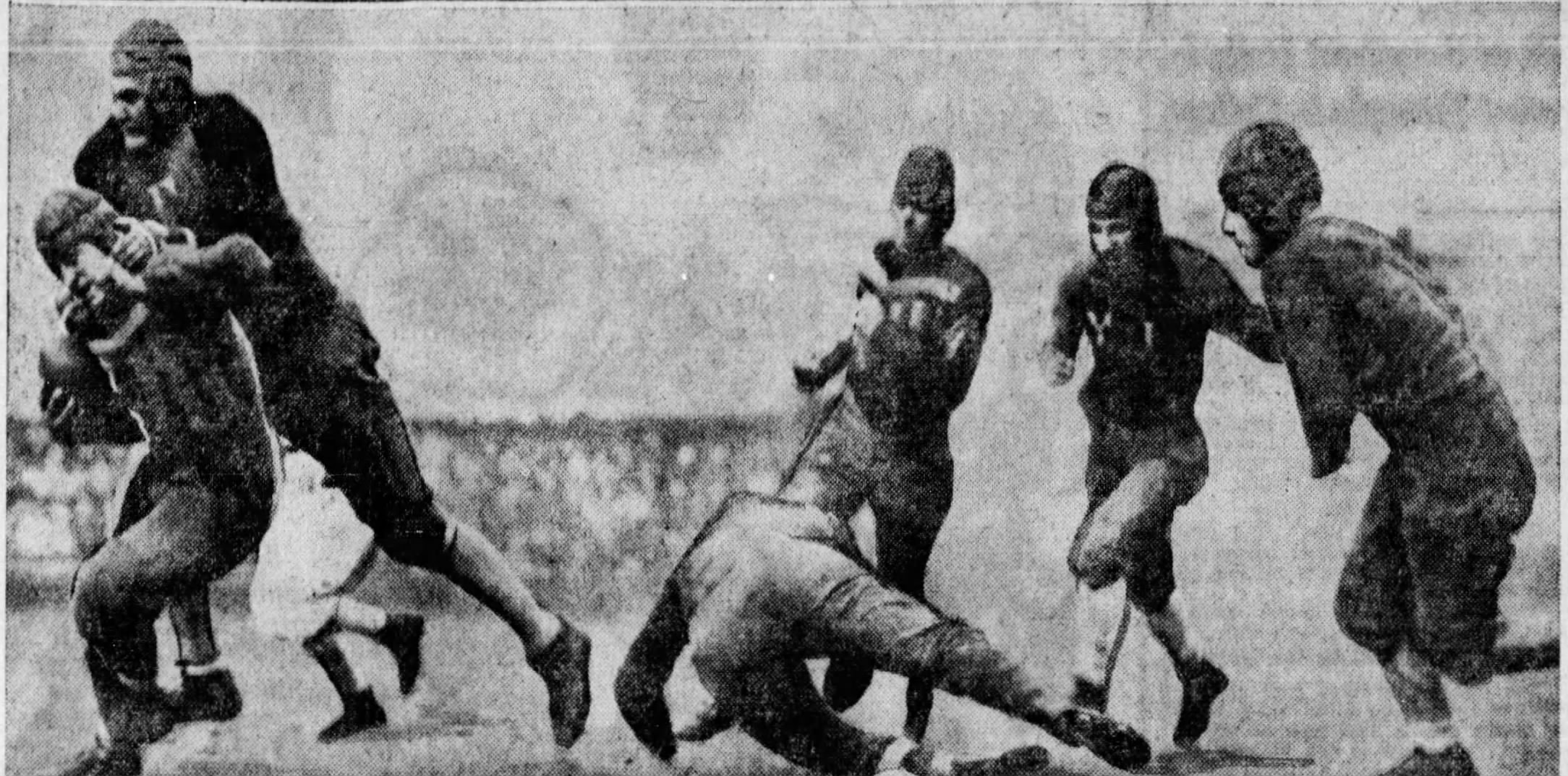
Frankford Yellow Jackets and the New York Yankees (1928)

The 1928 Frankford Yellow Jackets season was their fifth in the National Football League. The team returned ten veterans from their 1927 team.

The team improved on their 1927 record of 6–9–3 by winning eleven games. They finished second in the league standings with a winning percentage of .786.

== Schedule ==
Game	Date	Opponent	Result	Record	Venue	Attendance	Recap	Sources
–	September 16	at Orange Tornadoes	W 12–0	—		K of C Stadium		
1	September 23	at Green Bay Packers	W 19–9	1–0	6,500	City Stadium	Recap	
2	September 29	Dayton Triangles	W 6–0	2–0	4,000	Frankford Stadium	Recap	
–	October 6	Marquette University	W 14–0	—		Frankford Stadium		
3	October 7	at Providence Steam Roller	W 10–6	3–0	8,000	Cycledrome	Recap	
4	October 13	New York Yankees	L 0–13	3–1	6,000	Frankford Stadium	Recap	
5	October 20	Dayton Triangles	W 13–9	4–1	7,000	Frankford Stadium	Recap	
–	October 21	at Staten Island Stapletons	W 14–13	5–1		Thompson Stadium		
–	October 27	Millville Big Blue	W 26–0	—		Frankford Stadium		
–	October 28	at Clifton Heights Panthers	W 20–6	—		Kent Field		
6	November 3	Detroit Wolverines	W 25–7	5–1	8,000	Frankford Stadium	Recap	
7	November 4	at New York Giants	T 0–0	5–1–1	3,000	Polo Grounds	Recap	
8	November 10	Pottsville Maroons	W 19–0	6–1–1		Frankford Stadium	Recap	
9	November 11	at Pottsville Maroons	W 24–0	7–1–1		Minersville Park	Recap	
10	November 17	Providence Steam Roller	T 6–6	7–1–2	9,000	Frankford Stadium	Recap	
11	November 18	at Providence Steam Roller	L 0–6	7–2–2	12,000	Cycledrome	Recap	
12	November 24	Chicago Cardinals	W 19–0	8–2–2	8,000	Frankford Stadium	Recap	
13	November 29	Green Bay Packers	W 2–0	9–2–2	8,000	Frankford Stadium	Recap	
14	December 2	at Chicago Bears	L 6–28	9–3–2	12,000	Wrigley Field	Recap	
15	December 8	New York Giants	W 7–0	10–3–2	3,500	Frankford Stadium	Recap	
16	December 15	Chicago Bears	W 19–0	11–3–2	7,000	Frankford Stadium	Recap	
–	December 16	at Clifton Heights Panthers	W 52–3	—		Kent Field		
Note: Games in italics are against non-NFL teams. Thanksgiving Day: November 29.

== Standings ==
NFL standings
	W	L	T	PCT	PF	PA	STK
Providence Steam Roller	8	1	2	.889	128	42	T1
Frankford Yellow Jackets	11	3	2	.786	175	84	W2
Detroit Wolverines	7	2	1	.778	189	76	W4
Green Bay Packers	6	4	3	.600	120	92	W1
Chicago Bears	7	5	1	.583	182	85	L2
New York Giants	4	7	2	.364	79	136	L5
New York Yankees	4	8	1	.333	103	179	W1
Pottsville Maroons	2	8	0	.200	74	134	L1
Chicago Cardinals	1	5	0	.167	7	107	L4
Dayton Triangles	0	7	0	.000	9	131	L7

Note: Tie games were not officially counted in the standings until 1972.
