= 1928 NFL season =

American football season

Regular season
- Duration: September 23 – December 16, 1928
- Champions: Providence Steam Roller

NFL teams

The 1928 NFL season was the ninth regular season of the National Football League. The league dropped to 10 teams as the Cleveland Bulldogs and the Duluth Eskimos both folded before the season, while the Rochester Jeffersons, after missing two seasons of play, also folded, and the Buffalo Bisons also had a year out from the league. The Detroit Wolverines were added as an expansion team.

The Providence Steam Roller were named the NFL champions after finishing the season with the best record.

== Background ==
=== February league meeting ===
NFL team representatives assembled in Cleveland on February 11, 1928, to award the 1927 pennant to the New York Giants and to bestow individual player honors. Although two days were scheduled for the annual winter gathering, only one day was necessary, with the owners adjourning until July, when they were to gather in Providence, Rhode Island, for the purpose of scheduling.

== Teams ==
The league dropped to ten teams in 1928.

Last active season ^

Team	Head coach	Stadium
Chicago Bears	George Halas	Wrigley Field
Chicago Cardinals	Fred Gillies	Normal Park
Dayton Triangles	Faye Abbott	Triangle Park
Detroit Wolverines ^	LeRoy Andrews	Dinan Field
Frankford Yellow Jackets	Ed Weir	Frankford Stadium
Green Bay Packers	Curly Lambeau	City Stadium
New York Giants	Earl Potteiger	Polo Grounds
New York Yankees ^	Dick Rauch	Yankee Stadium
Pottsville Maroons	Pete Henry	Minersville Park
Providence Steam Roller	Jimmy Conzelman	Cycledrome

== Standings ==
NFL standings
	W	L	T	PCT	PF	PA	STK
Providence Steam Roller	8	1	2	.889	128	42	T1
Frankford Yellow Jackets	11	3	2	.786	175	84	W2
Detroit Wolverines	7	2	1	.778	189	76	W4
Green Bay Packers	6	4	3	.600	120	92	W1
Chicago Bears	7	5	1	.583	182	85	L2
New York Giants	4	7	2	.364	79	136	L5
New York Yankees	4	8	1	.333	103	179	W1
Pottsville Maroons	2	8	0	.200	74	134	L1
Chicago Cardinals	1	5	0	.167	7	107	L4
Dayton Triangles	0	7	0	.000	9	131	L7

Note: Tie games were not officially counted in the standings until 1972.

== Championship race ==
After four weeks, the Chicago Bears and the Detroit Wolverines were both unbeaten. On October 21, the Packers beat the Bears, 16–6, leaving Detroit, at 2–0–0, at the top of the standings. On November 3, near Philadelphia, the Frankford Yellow Jackets (4–1–0) hosted Detroit (3–0–0), and beat them 25–7. The next day, Detroit (3–1–0) lost 0–7 at Providence (4–1–0), and the Yellow Jackets and the Steamrollers were tied for the lead at the end of Week Seven.

Frankford played a series against Pottsville in Week Eight, winning 19–0 at home, and 24–0 on the road, for a 7–1–1 record that put it in first place ahead of Providence. In Week Nine, on November 18, the Providence Steam Rollers (5–1–1) hosted the Frankford Yellow Jackets (7–1–2) in Rhode Island, in a regular season game that ultimately would determine which team would win the NFL championship. Providence's 6–0 win put the Steam Rollers in first place, and it didn't lose any of its last three games, finishing at 8–1–2, while Frankford finished second at 11–3–2. Had the Yellow Jackets beaten the Steamrollers, their records at season's end would have been 12–2–2 and 7–2–2, respectively. Providence was formally awarded the championship at the post-season meeting of the NFL owners.
