= Fred Gillies =

American football player and coach (1895–1974)

No. 10, 5, 11, 66, 9
- Positions: Tackle, head coach

Personal information
- Born: December 9, 1895; Chicago, Illinois, U.S.
- Died: May 8, 1974 (aged 78); Flossmoor, Illinois, U.S.

Career information
- College: Cornell

Career history

Playing
- 1920–1926, 1928: Chicago Cardinals

Coaching
- 1928: Chicago Cardinals

Awards and highlights
- NFL champion (1925); Second-team All-Pro (1922); National champion (1915)
- Coaching profile at Pro Football Reference
- Stats at Pro Football Reference

Frederick Montague Gillies (December 9, 1895 – May 8, 1974) was an American football player and coach for the Chicago Cardinals of the National Football League (NFL). He graduated from Cornell University in 1918 and was a member of the Quill and Dagger society. He appeared in 72 games, 51 of which as a starter, as a tackle for the Chicago Cardinals between 1920 and 1933, earning All-Pro honors in 1922. He coached the team in 1928, which was his final season as a player and only as a coach, to a 1–5 record.

Fred later married Blanche Wilder and adopted Theo Janet Howells, the biological daughter of Blanche's sister, Gertrude Wilder. Gillies also worked and volunteered for the Republican Party. In 1932, he was a survivor in a plane crash that took the life of aviator Eddie Stinson, the founder of Stinson Aircraft Company. Gillies suffered a leg injury, as a result of the accident, which left him in a leg brace for the rest of his life.
