= 1928 Green Bay Packers season =

NFL team season

- Head coach: Curly Lambeau
- Home stadium: City Stadium

Results
- Record: 6–4–3
- League place: 4th NFL

The 1928 Green Bay Packers season was their tenth season overall and their eighth season in the National Football League. The team finished with a 6–4–3 record under player/coach Curly Lambeau earning them a fourth-place finish.

== Schedule ==
Game	Date	Opponent	Result	Record	Attendance	Venue	Recap	Sources
1	September 23	Frankford Yellow Jackets	L 9–19	0–1	6,500	City Stadium	Recap	
2	September 30	Chicago Bears	T 12–12	0–1–1	8,500	City Stadium	Recap	
3	October 7	New York Giants	L 0–6	0–2–1	7,000	City Stadium	Recap	
4	October 14	Chicago Cardinals	W 20–0	1–2–1	4,200	City Stadium	Recap	
5	October 21	at Chicago Bears	W 16–6	2–2–1	15,000	Wrigley Field	Recap	
6	October 28	Dayton Triangles	W 17–0	3–2–1	3,100	City Stadium	Recap	
7	November 4	Pottsville Maroons	W 26–14	4–2–1	5,000	City Stadium	Recap	
8	November 11	New York Yankees	T 0–0	4–2–2	5,000	City Stadium	Recap	
9	November 18	at New York Giants	W 7–0	5–2–2	25,000	Polo Grounds	Recap	
10	November 25	at Pottsville Maroons	L 0–26	5–3–2	1,600	Minersville Park	Recap	
11	November 29	at Frankford Yellow Jackets	L 0–2	5–4–2	8,000	Frankford Stadium	Recap	
12	December 2	at Providence Steam Roller	T 7–7	5–4–3	10,500	Cycledrome	Recap	
13	December 9	at Chicago Bears	W 6–0	6–4–3	14,000	Wrigley Field	Recap	

== Standings ==
NFL standings
	W	L	T	PCT	PF	PA	STK
Providence Steam Roller	8	1	2	.889	128	42	T1
Frankford Yellow Jackets	11	3	2	.786	175	84	W2
Detroit Wolverines	7	2	1	.778	189	76	W4
Green Bay Packers	6	4	3	.600	120	92	W1
Chicago Bears	7	5	1	.583	182	85	L2
New York Giants	4	7	2	.364	79	136	L5
New York Yankees	4	8	1	.333	103	179	W1
Pottsville Maroons	2	8	0	.200	74	134	L1
Chicago Cardinals	1	5	0	.167	7	107	L4
Dayton Triangles	0	7	0	.000	9	131	L7

Note: Tie games were not officially counted in the standings until 1972.
