= University of Detroit Stadium =

Defunct outdoor athletic stadium in Michigan, US

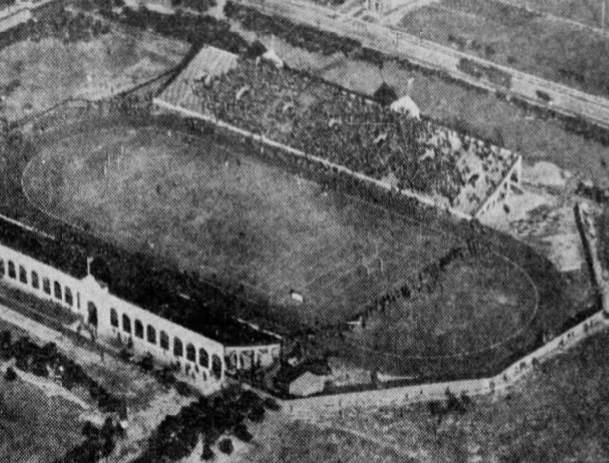
- Aerial view of University of Detroit Stadium in 1929
- Interactive map of University of Detroit Stadium
- Location: Detroit, Michigan, U.S.
- Coordinates: 42.4158°N 83.1368°W
- Owner: University of Detroit
- Capacity: 25,000
- Surface: Natural grass

Construction
- Opened: 1922
- Closed: 1964 (football)
- Demolished: 1971

Tenants
- Detroit Titans (NCAA) 1922–1964; Detroit Wolverines (NFL) 1928; Detroit Lions (NFL) 1934–1937, 1940; Wayne Tartars (NCAA) 1944–1953; Detroit Cougars (USA) 1967–1968; Michigan Arrows (CFL) 1968

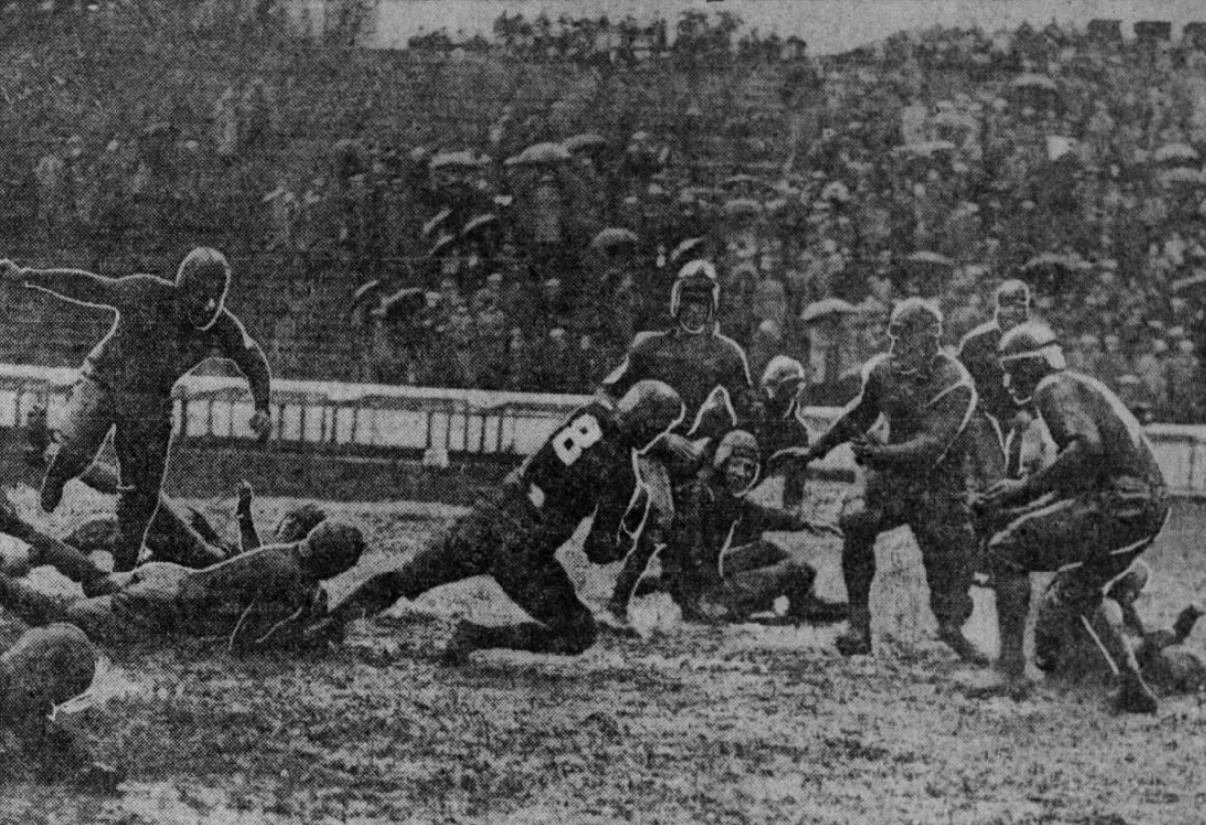
The Detroit Titans battling the Quantico Marines Devil Dogs on October 24, 1925

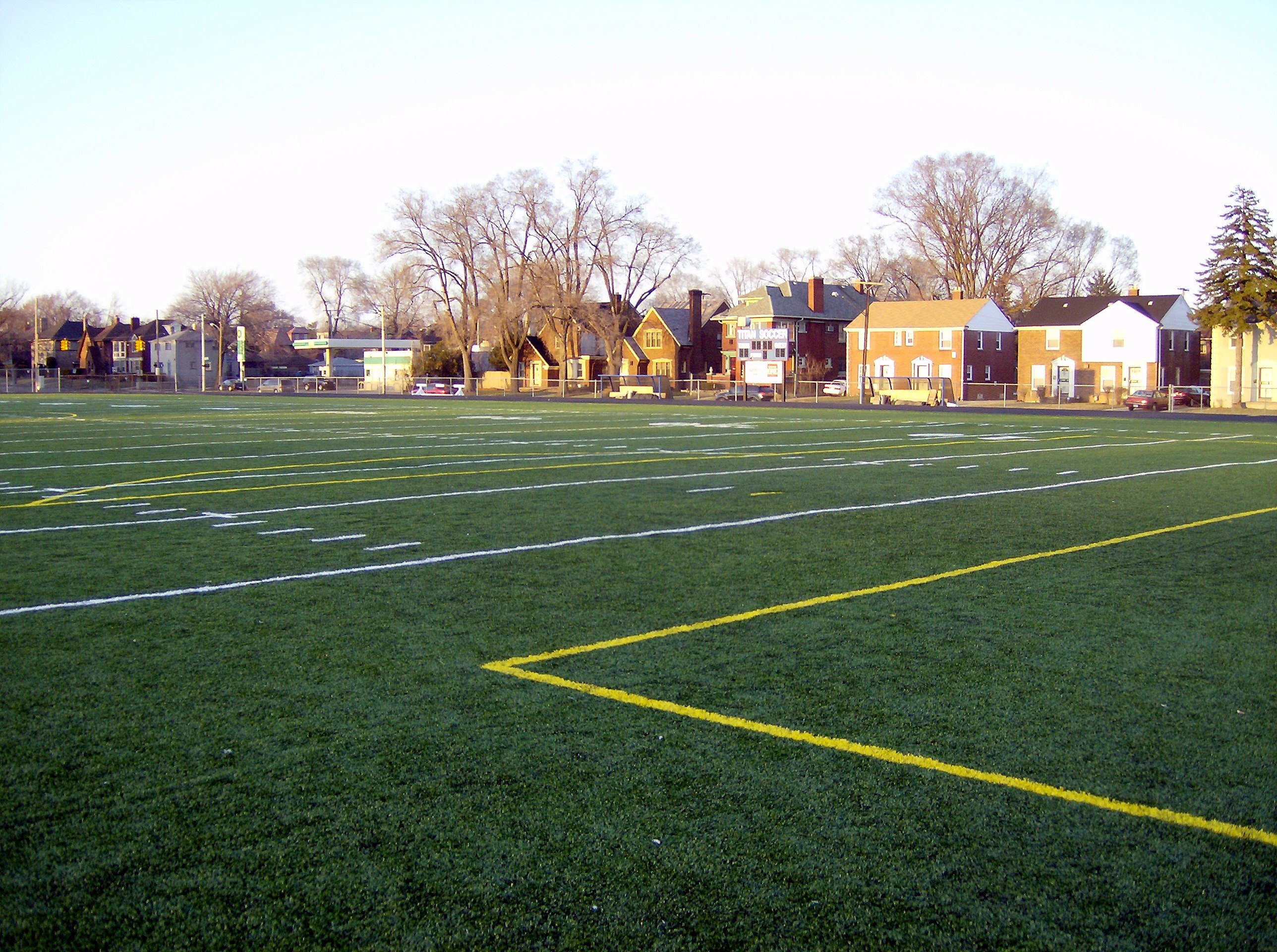
The University of Detroit's athletic field in 2008

University of Detroit Stadium, also known as U of D Stadium, Titan Stadium, or Dinan Field, was an outdoor athletic stadium in the north central United States, located on the campus of the University of Detroit in Detroit, Michigan. The stadium opened in 1922, on land that had been acquired for the university's proposed new McNichols campus (the university moved its main campus there in 1927).

The primary tenant was the University of Detroit Titans football team, who played their home games there from the time it opened until the university dropped the program, following the 1964 season.

== Location ==
The stadium stood on 6 Mile Road (later also known as McNichols Road) just west of Fairfield Street at the northeast corner of the campus. The field was aligned north-south, with grandstands on the east and west sidelines, encircled by a running track. It had a seating capacity of 25,000 at its peak.

In addition to football, it was also used for track meets, concerts, and other university-related and public events. One rather unusual aspect of the stadium were its lighting towers, which stood between the stands and the field, which was at an approximate elevation of 650 feet (200 m) above sea level.

== Tenants ==
University of Detroit Stadium was the home field for the NFL's Detroit Lions from 1934 to 1937, and again in 1940. The Lions also played several early season home games there in 1938 and 1939. The stadium was also home to the Detroit Wolverines for their only NFL season in 1928. U of D stadium was the site of the 1935 NFL Championship Game, won by the Lions over the New York Giants, 26–7.

The Wayne Tartars football team often played home games here from 1944 to 1953 before moving into Tartar Field in 1954.

The Detroit Cougars professional soccer club played several games here in the summers of 1967 and 1968 whenever their regular home field, Tiger Stadium had a scheduling conflict. One such match in 1967 against the Houston Stars ended in an infamous player riot on June 14.

The Michigan Arrows of the fledgling Continental Football League used the stadium (which then had a capacity of 20,000) for the 1968 season. Unfortunately, the Arrows drew just 4,240 fans per game en route to a 1-11 season. The Arrows moved to Midland to become the Tri-City Apollos in 1969, then folded with the rest of the league.

== Demolition ==
The stadium was demolished in 1971, with athletic director Bob Calihan citing the structure's poor physical condition and the unlikelihood of varsity football returning to the university. The site was turned into 960 automobile parking spaces. The university's club football team relocated its games to the University of Detroit High School's field.

| Preceded by Universal Stadium | Home of the Detroit Lions; 1934–1937 | Succeeded by Tiger Stadium |
