= Syracuse Salts =

Professional softball team

The Syracuse Salts (also known as the Syracuse Salt, singular) were a professional softball team based in Syracuse, New York who played at Hopkins Road Field in Liverpool, New York in the United Professional Softball League (UPSL) in 1981.

== League history ==
During the late 1970s and early 1980s, men's professional softball leagues were formed in the United States to build on the growth and talent in the booming men's amateur softball game during this period.

The American Professional Slo-Pitch League (APSPL) was the first such league, launching in an era of experimentation in professional sports leagues. The APSPL was formed in 1977 by former World Football League front-office executive Bill Byrne, who would go on to found the Women's Professional Basketball League. Former New York Yankees star Whitey Ford was the first APSPL commissioner. In 1980, three teams, the Fort Wayne Huggie Bears, the Milwaukee Schlitz and the Cleveland Stepien's Competitors broke away to form the North American Softball League (NASL) under the leadership of Ted Stepien, who owned 6 of the 8 teams in the league (only Fort Wayne and Milwaukee had non-Stepien ownership), while the APSPL continued with just 6 teams. The NASL lasted one season.

In 1981 the APSPL merged with NASL to create the United Professional Softball League (UPSL), but only the Milwaukee franchise came from the NASL to the new league as the other NASL teams folded. The merged league competed for two seasons, before disbanding after the 1982 season, ending the pro era of men's softball.

Salts part-owner AJ Kalil had paid a $25,000 entry fee for the league but ended up resigning as team President in June, turning over the role to part-owner Peter Silvanic, father of catcher-pitcher-part owner Tom Silvanic. The Syracuse Salts joined the UPSL for the first merged season in 1981 and disbanded when the season was completed.

== Syracuse Salts ==
The Salts put forward the worst record in the six years of professional softball -- indeed, one of the worst records in the entire history of professional sports -- by finishing the 1981 UPSL season with a record of 4-52 (.071), 31 games behind the South Jersey Athletics. The Kentucky Bourbons would win the 1981 UPSL World Series 5-3 over the New England Pilgrims. Greg Whitlock of the Bourbons was the series MVP and teammate Bill Gatti (.622, 38 HRs, 99 RBIs) put forward a triple-crown season to win the league MVP award. No Syracuse players received league honors. Joe Costello, a former San Francisco Giants farm-hand who had made it as high as the Triple-A Phoenix Giants, was a late addition to the club and brought pro softball experience having played previously for the Rochester Zeniths. Fellow former minor league baseball player Ed Ricks, who had made it as high as Triple-A with the Syracuse Chiefs, also played for the Salts, while outfielder Mike Ondrako and catcher Gary Duncan helped to lead over-matched Syracuse.

The Salts disbanded at the end of the 1981 season. The USPL disbanded after the 1982 season with players returning once again to the amateur ranks.

== Syracuse Salts record ==
Year	Record	Pct	Finish	Division	Playoffs	League
1981	4-52	.071	4th	Eastern	-	UPSL
