= Cincinnati Rivermen =

Professional softball team

The Cincinnati Rivermen were a professional softball team who played at Newport Recreation Center in Newport, Kentucky in the North American Softball League (NASL) during the 1980 season.

== League history ==
Cincinnati was represented by the Cincinnati Suds, who played in the first professional league, the American Professional Slo-Pitch League (APSPL), beginning with the founding of that league in 1977. But 1980 was a year of division in professional softball as the Cleveland Stepien's Competitors, the Fort Wayne Huggie Bears and the Milwaukee Schlitz broke away from the APSPL to form a new league, the North American Softball League, under the leadership of Cleveland Stepien's Competitors owner Ted Stepien. The Cincinnati Suds continued in the reduced numbers of the APSPL. Stepien placed NASL teams in several APSPL markets, including Lexington, Pittsburgh, and Cincinnati with the Rivermen. Stepien owned 6 of the 8 teams in the NASL, with only Milwaukee and Fort Wayne having local ownership. The owner of the Pittsburgh Hardhats of the APSPL brought an unsuccessful challenge in federal court in an attempt to prevent splitting the young professional sport.

Stepien went into the APSPL markets trying to lure talent away as well. He hired Donnie Rardin, former Kentucky Bourbons player, to play and serve as General Manager for the Lexington Stallions, and did the same in Pittsburgh with Roger Snatchko, former Pittsburgh Hardhat, who would lead the new Pittsburgh Champions. It was much the same in Cincinnati, hiring former Sud Mike LaFever to play and serve as General Manager. LaFever would then draw even more talent from his former team, splitting the Cincinnati professional ranks just before the season was to begin. The Suds would play the 1980 APSPL season at the Crosley Field replica in nearby Union, Kentucky.

== Cincinnati Rivermen ==
General Manager and outfielder Mike Lafever brought several Suds players to the Rivermen as outfielders Greg Sandy, Mike O'Brien and Jim Tuttle, player-manager Paul Campbell and infielders Jim Kuhn and Mike LaVangie came to the new team with extensive experience gained with the Suds. The Rivermen missed the NASL playoffs with a 25-37 (.403), 10.5 games behind the Eastern Division winning Detroit Auto Kings and 5.5 games behind 2nd place Cleveland. Riverman Jim Kuhn added to the Cleveland-Cincinnati rivalry in June with a bench-clearing brawl with Cleveland pitcher Dana Andry, which resulted in NASL Commissioner Robert Brown suspending Kuhn for a pair of games. In late July, Cincinnati was 2.5 games behind Cleveland for a playoff spot A late-season 6th game, a three double-header sweep in Detroit cemented the 3rd place finish on the season for the Rivermen.

Mike LaFever (34 HRs, 88 RBIs) and player-manager Paul Campbell (.514 BA) made the NASL all-pro team for the Rivermen. Mike O'Brien and Jim Tuttle (24 HRs) represented the Rivermen at the mid-season NASL All-Star game in Willoughby, Ohio.

The NASL and the Cincinnati Rivermen franchise lasted only one season. After the season, the NASL and the APSPL officially merged, but only the Milwaukee Schlitz would go to the new United Professional Softball League (UPSL) and the Rivermen disbanded. Of note, the Cincinnati Suds had their worst record in their six seasons of professional softball in the divided year of 1980 and would rebound to a league-leading best record in 1981. Rivermen (O'Brien, LaFever, Campbell) were members of the 1981 UPSL champion Kentucky Bourbons squad and O'Brien would deliver a game-winning hit for Kentucky in the semi-finals to end the Suds shot at a title. The UPSL folded after the 1982 season, bringing an end to the professional softball era for men in the United States as players returned once again to amateur leagues.

== Cincinnati Rivermen record ==
Year	Record	Pct	Finish	Division	Playoffs	League
1980	25-37	.403	3rd	Eastern	-	NASL

== See also ==
- Sports in Cincinnati, Ohio
