= Lima Steele's =

Professional softball team

Lima Steele's were a professional softball team based in Lima, Ohio. Lima Steele's played at the baseball diamond on the campus of the Ohio State University at Lima in the United Professional Softball League (UPSL) in 1982.

== League history ==
During the late 1970s and early 1980s, men's professional softball leagues were formed in the United States to build on the growth and talent in the booming men's amateur softball game during this period.

The American Professional Slo-Pitch League (APSPL) was the first such league, launching in an era of experimentation in professional sports leagues. The APSPL was formed in 1977 by former World Football League front-office executive Bill Byrne, who would go on to found the Women's Professional Basketball League. Former New York Yankees star Whitey Ford was the first APSPL commissioner. In 1980, three teams, Fort Wayne, Milwaukee and Cleveland broke away to form the North American Softball League (NASL) under the leadership of Ted Stepien, who owned 6 of the 8 teams in the league (only the Fort Wayne Huggie Bears and Milwaukee Schlitz had non-Stepien ownership), while the APSPL continued with just 6 teams. The NASL lasted one season.

In 1981 the APSPL merged with NASL to create the United Professional Softball League (UPSL), but only the Milwaukee franchise came from the NASL to the new league as the other NASL teams folded. The merged league competed for two seasons, before disbanding after the 1982 season, ending the pro era of men's softball. Lima Steele's, named for the Steele's Sports Company, was a long-time power in amateur softball and entered the professional ranks in 1982, the last season of the USPL.

== Lima Steele's ==
The powerhouse reputation of Lima Steele's got off to an early struggle as the team tried to find a home. The team had initially planned to play at Simmons Field in Lima, but the Lima school board denied the permit due to the Steele's desire for alcohol sales at games. The team was forced to play some early season games at Vic Lyons Field in Dayton, Ohio before finding a home on the campus of Ohio State University at Lima. Lima Steele's struggled with the jump to professional play, finishing the 1982 USPL season 20-38 (.348), 4th in the Western Division, 16.5 games behind the Kentucky Bourbons. Milwaukee would defeat Detroit Softball City 5–1 in the finals behind the hitting of World Series MVP Dick Laba (16-24, .667 BA). Dana Andry of the Cleveland Competitors was the USPL MVP. Amateur softball legend, Andrew "Mighty Joe" Young (.476, 40 HRs, 106 RBIs) of Lima, lived up to the hype and made the all-pro team for 1982. Lima also featured Eric Thornton, brother of Major League Baseball player Andre Thornton, pro softball veterans Mike LaFever and Cardell Collins, along with former MLB player Ralph Garr.

The USPL disbanded after the 1982 season with players returning once again to the amateur ranks.

== Lima Steele's record ==
Year	Record	Pct	Finish	Division	Playoffs	League
1980	20-38	.348	4th	Western	-	UPSL
