= New Jersey Statesmen =

Professional softball team

Information
- League: North American Softball League
- Location: New Jersey
- Founded: 1977
- Folded: 1979
- 1979
- Former name: Trenton Statesmen; Trenton Champales
- Former league: American Professional Slo-Pitch League
- Former ballpark(s): Mercer County Park (1977-1979); Wetzel Field (1979)

The New Jersey Statesmen, sometimes seen as Trenton's New Jersey Statesmen, later named the Trenton Statesmen and the Trenton Champales, were a professional softball team that played in the American Professional Slo-Pitch League (APSPL) from 1977 through 1979 at Mercer County Park in West Windsor, New Jersey (1977–78) and Wetzel Field in Chambersburg, New Jersey (1979).

== League history ==
During the late 1970s and early 1980s, several men's professional slow-pitch softball leagues were formed in the United States to build on the growth and talent in the booming men's amateur game during this period. The American Professional Slo-Pitch League (APSPL) was the first such league, launching in an era of experimentation in professional sports leagues. The APSPL was formed in 1977 by former World Football League front-office executive Bill Byrne, who would go on to found the Women's Professional Basketball League. Former New York Yankees star Whitey Ford was the first APSPL commissioner. The New Jersey franchise changed names in each of their three seasons - New Jersey Statesmen (1977), Trenton Statesmen (1978) and Trenton Champales (1979). Ken Goodwin, a retired sales manager, led a group of owners with the franchise in Trenton, and the team would feature former Major League Baseball players Curt Blefary, Danny Napoleon and Joe Pepitone.

== ASPL history ==
New Jersey struggled out of the gate in the inaugural 1977 professional softball season, finishing the year 16-38 (.296), 4th in the Eastern Division, 17.5 games back of the Baltimore Monuments. Baltimore would navigate the playoff to the World Series where they were defeated by the Detroit Caesars 4-0 as Mike Nye of Detroit, series MVP, batted .600. Benny Holt of the Chicago Storm won the triple crown and was honored as league MVP. John Spadaccino (.550, 32 HRs, 97 RBIs) was the lone Statesmen to make the All-APSPL team. Art Kearns (.503 BA), Steve Shurina (.422 BA) and Bob Overmiller (.412, 23 HRs, 67 RBIs) had solid seasons in support. Major League Baseball alumni Curt Blefary, coach, second-base and pitcher, and Danny Napoleon, catcher, were with the Statesmen in 1977.

The team changed names for 1978, Curt Blefary took over as manager, and the now Trenton Statesmen improved to a 28-36 (.438) record, 9 games back of the New England Pilgrims and again out of the APSPL playoffs. Blefary was fired as manager in late June, and Frank Cariello replaced Goodwin as general manager. The Detroit Caesars repeated as champions in 1978, defeating the Minnesota Norsemen 4–0 with Bert Smith of Detroit winning the series MVP and teammate Ron Ford honored as league MVP. Mike Foley (563, 35 HRs, 109 RBIs) paced the Statesmen and was named to the all-pro team for 1978. Larry Chiapetta (.532, 5 HRs, 23 RBIs), Gary Richter (.493, 12 HRs, 42 RBIs), John Spadaccino (.486, 36 HRs, 129 RBIs), Bob Overmiller (.438, 14 HRs, 47 RBI) Mike Kolb (.419, 15 HRs, 33 RBIs), Jim Galloway (.413, 28 HRs, 72 RBIs), and John Dunn (.408, 34 HRs, 82 RBIs) had good years for Trenton. Softball legend Galloway had been added in the off-season from the defunct New York Clippers. The Statesmen also featured former New York Yankee Joe Pepitone (110-225, .489, 14 HRs, 61 RBIs) showed himself to be a competent softballer, and in 1978, Trenton turned down an offer of $30,000 from Detroit to purchase his contract.

The team added a sponsor name (Champale was a malt liquor brewed in Trenton) to become the Trenton Champales for 1979, Pepitone took over managing the club, and the team took another step forward with a 30-30 (.500) finish, good for 2nd place in the Eastern Division behind the Rochester Zeniths (softball). The Champales advanced to the playoffs, losing in the first round to the Kentucky Bourbons 3–0. The Milwaukee Schlitz took the APSPL title in 1979 over Kentucky, with Schlitz player Rick Weiterman winning both the series and league MVP awards. This series was the first sporting event to air on the new sports network ESPN. Gary Richter of Trenton (.501 BA) made the 1979 all-league squad with Mike Kolb (.483, 22 HRs), John Spadaccino (.469, 20 HRs) and Sam Sapienza (27-22 pitching) offering added to the cause, as did Pepitone (50-122,.410, 9 HRs, 30 RBIs).

The New Jersey franchise disbanded at the end of the 1979 season. Joe Pepitone went on to serve as team president and played first base for the Chicago team in the North American Softball League (NASL) in 1980. Jim Galloway of the Statesmen is a member of the American Softball Association Hall of Fame, inducted in 1985.

== Franchise year-by-year record ==
Year	Team name	Record	Pct	Finish	Division	Playoffs	League
1977	New Jersey Statesmen	16-38	.296	4th	Eastern	-	APSPL
1978	Trenton Statesmen	28-36	.438	3rd	Eastern	-	APSPL
1979	Trenton Champales	30-30	.500	2nd	Eastern	1st Round	APSPL
