= Chicago Nationwide Advertising =

American softball team

Chicago Nationwide Advertising were a professional softball team that played in the North American Softball League (NASL) during the 1980 season. They played their home games at The team played at Lou Boudreau Field in Harvey, Illinois.

== League history ==
Chicago was represented by the Chicago Storm, who played in the first professional league, the American Professional Slo-Pitch League (APSPL), beginning with the founding of that league in 1977. The Storm disbanded after the 1978 season and the APSPL continued, but 1980 was a year of division in professional softball as the Cleveland Stepien's Competitors, the Fort Wayne Huggie Bears and the Milwaukee Schlitz broke away from the APSPL to form a new league, the North American Softball League, under the leadership of Cleveland Stepien's Competitors owner Ted Stepien. The Cincinnati Suds continued in the reduced numbers of the APSPL. Stepien placed NASL teams in several APSPL markets, including Lexington, Pittsburgh, and Cincinnati with the Rivermen. Stepien owned 6 of the 8 teams in the NASL, with only Milwaukee and Fort Wayne having local ownership. The owner of the Pittsburgh Hardhats of the APSPL brought an unsuccessful challenge in federal court in an attempt to prevent splitting the young professional sport.

Stepien went into the APSPL markets trying to lure talent away as well. He hired Donnie Rardin, former Kentucky Bourbons player, to play and serve as General Manager for the Lexington Stallions, did the same in Pittsburgh with Roger Snatchko, former Pittsburgh Hardhat, who would lead the new Pittsburgh Champions and much the same in Cincinnati with former Cincinnati Sud Mike LaFever as player and General Manager. Detroit was much less contentious as the Detroit Caesars had folded after the 1979 season, allowing the NASL Detroit Auto Kings to take over as the professional softball team. Chicago did not have a pro softball team for the 1979 APSPL season, as many players simply returned to the competitive 16-inch softball tournaments in the Chicago area, although Mike Krolicki played for the Fort Wayne Scouts in 1979. Stepien formed and owned the Chicago NASL team, naming it after his advertising firm.

== Chicago Nationwide Advertising ==
Stepien made a splash in the Chicago sports market when he brought on former Chicago Cub Joe Pepitone to serve as team President and play first-base. Pepitone has played previously for the Trenton Statesmen in the APSPL. Pepitone would get a suspension during the year for "conduct detrimental to professional softball" when NASL Commissioner Robert Brown suspended him for 6 games and then was lost to the season in August with a thigh injury. The team was managed by local 16-inch softball legend Eddie Zolna.

It was an excellent regular season for CNA as Chicago finished 43-19 (.694), 2nd in the Western Division, 5 games behind the Milwaukee Schlitz. CNA advanced to the playoffs to face Milwaukee, whom Chicago had beaten 5 times in 16 regular season match-ups. A late-season game between the team has gotten physical as CNA player Greg Linhart and Schlitz pitcher Tom Gorski tussled after Linhart felt he was being held down during a wild throw, leading CNA Manager Eddie Zolna to state "the only thing he did wrong was he didn't hit him. Those dirty play shennanigans are part of Milwaukee's game. They need them jammed back down their throats."

It was a tight series, with Chicago outhitting Milwaukee 141-127 (.455 to .425 BA), but CNA stranded runners and the Schlitz would defeat Chicago in the playoffs 4-2 (9-13, 10-7, 17-12, 16-12, 10-17, 22-17). Milwaukee would go on to win the NASL World Series in 1980 over the Detroit Auto Kings 5-2 behind the hitting of Ken Parker (.586, 16 RBIs) in the series. Ron Olesiak (.555, 34 HRs, 124 RBIs) of Chicago won the league MVP trophy, and Chicago added all-pro seasons from Mike Krolicki (27-6 pitching record), Buddy Haines (.518, 27 HRS, 115 RBIs), Tommy Spahn (.527, 15 HRs, 97 RBIs), Curt Dusek (.413 BA), Willie Simpson (.506, 23 doubles, 13 triples) and Jake Jakobi (.520 BA). Olesiak, Dusek, Simpson, Spahn represented Chicago at the mid-season All-Star game and Zolna managed the West team.

The NASL lasted one season before combining with the APSPL to form a new league, the United Professional Softball League (UPSL). That league disbanded in 1982, bringing an end to the professional era of men's softball in the US as players once again returned to the amateur leagues.

Chicago Nationwide Advertising team featured two members of the American Softball Association Hall of Fame - manager Eddie Zolna and catcher Willie Simpson. Ron Olesiak would become a basketball referee, making it to the National Basketball Association, and Mike Krolicki is a member of the Chicago 16-inch Softball Hall of Fame (as is Olesiak, Zolna and Buddy Haines) and a retired Chicago firefighter.

== Chicago Nationwide Advertising record ==
Year	Record	Pct	Finish	Division	Playoffs	League
1980	43-19	.694	2nd	Midwest	Semi-Finals	NASL
