= Detroit Auto Kings =

Professional softball team

The Detroit Auto Kings were a professional softball team that played in the North American Softball League (NASL) in the 1980 season at Memorial Field in East Detroit, Michigan.

== League history ==
Detroit was represented by the Detroit Caesars, who played in the first professional league, the American Professional Slo-Pitch League (APSPL), beginning with the founding of that league in 1977. The Caesars disbanded after the 1978 season and the APSPL continue. However, 1980 was a year of division in professional softball as the Cleveland Stepien's Competitors, the Fort Wayne Huggie Bears and the Milwaukee Schlitz broke away from the APSPL to form a new league, the North American Softball League, under the leadership of Cleveland Stepien's Competitors owner Ted Stepien. The Cincinnati Suds continued in the reduced numbers of the APSPL. Stepien placed NASL teams in several APSPL markets, including Lexington, Pittsburgh, and Cincinnati. Stepien owned 6 of the 8 teams in the NASL, with only Milwaukee and Fort Wayne having local ownership. The owner of the Pittsburgh Hardhats of the APSPL brought an unsuccessful challenge in federal court in an attempt to prevent splitting the young professional sport.

Stepien went into the APSPL markets trying to lure talent away as well. He hired Donnie Rardin, former Kentucky Bourbons player, to play and serve as General Manager for the Lexington Stallions, did the same in Pittsburgh with Roger Snatchko, former Pittsburgh Hardhat, who would lead the new Pittsburgh Champions and much the same in Cincinnati with former Cincinnati Sud Mike LaFever as player and General Manager. Detroit was much less contentious as the Detroit Caesars had folded after the 1979 season, allowing the NASL Detroit Auto Kings to take over as the professional softball team, with former Caesars outfielder Mike Gouin managing the team. Stepien formed and owned the Detroit NASL team, naming it in honor of the history of Detroit auto manufacturing.

Former MLB players Mudcat Grant and Joe Pepitone served as PR officials for the league, with Pepitone serving as team President and playing for Chicago Nationwide Advertising. Pepitone was a former player for the Trenton Champales franchise in the APSPL. The NASL would last just one season.

== Detroit Auto Kings ==
The Auto Kings played at the same field as the Detroit Caesars, Memorial Field in East Detroit, and the Auto Kings roster featured several members of Detroit Caesar teams including outfielder Dan Murphy, third-baseman Gary Geister, outfielder Mike Gouin, first-baseman Cal Carmen, and pitcher Tony Mazza. Mike Gouin also served as team manager.

Continuing the Caesars tradition of former Detroit Tigers turning to play professional softball, the Auto Kings featured former Detroit Tigers outfielder Mickey Stanley. The Auto Kings advanced to the playoffs with a 35-26 (.574) record, 1st in the Eastern Division. The team catapulted in the standings in August with a six-game, three-doubleheader sweep of the Cincinnati Rivermen with strong hitting from Matt Partridge, Dan Murphy, Mike Turk and Gary Geister. The team clinched a playoff berth and first place in a dominating weekend.

Detroit would advance to the playoffs, winning the semifinals 4–1 over Cleveland (6–4, 8–7, 19–4, 5–10, 14–5) with a Mike Taylor grand-slam leading the way to an Auto King victory in the fiftth game. Next up was Milwaukee, the 1979 APSPL champion, in the NASL World Series. Detroit would return to their home-field down 2-3, but Milwaukee would come to Detroit and sweep a double-header, with two home-runs in the first game by Schlitz Jim Dillard. In the seventh game, Detroit fought back from an early Milwaukee lead on a home-run by Gary Gesiter to take a late, lead; however, a two-run inning from Milwaukee in the 8th inning, with a sacrifice fly by Ken Parker, gave Milwaukee the 9-8 series-clinching win. The series would go to the Schlitz 5–2 (19–11, 10–12, 12–16, 22–13, 13–4, 12–3, 11–9), with Ken Parker (.586 BA) of Milwaukee the World Series MVP.

Ron Olesiak (.555, 34 HRs, 124 RBIs) of Chicago Nationwide Advertising was the NASL 1980 MVP. The only two Auto Kings to appear in the top-ten categories were Gary Geister (5th, 31 HRs) and Jerry Gadette (10th, 24 HRs). 3B/SS Mike Turk (.518, 27 HRs, 115 RBIs) was the only Auto King to receive all-league honors in 1980. Matt Partridge (22 HRs) and Gary Geister (31 HRs, 80 RBIs) added to the cause.

The NASL lasted one season before combining with the APSPL to form a new league, the United Professional Softball League (UPSL). That league disbanded in 1982, bringing an end to the professional era of men's softball in the US as players once again returned to the amateur leagues.

Auto King Mike Gouin is a member of the American Softball Association Hall of Fame. In addition, Cal Carmen is a member of the United States Slowpitch Softball Association (USSSA) Hall of Fame.

== Detroit Auto Kings record ==
Year	Record	Pct	Finish	Division	Playoffs	League
1980	35-26	.574	1st	Eastern	World Series (runner-up)	NASL

== Detroit Softball City ==
The APSPL and the NASL then merged to form the United Professional Softball League in 1981, although only Milwaukee came to the new league from the NASL as the other franchises, including the Auto Kings, disbanded. No Detroit team played in 1981 in the UPSL. In 1982, Detroit Softball City, playing at and named for a large softball complex on the grounds of the Michigan State Fair, played in the UPSL and were led by Charlie Mitchell and Braxton Speller, along with former Caesars Rick Trudeau, Doug Gerdes, Chuck Drewicz, George Birch, Gary Geister and manager Gary Vitto, along with former Auto Kings Matt Partridge and Mike Turk. Detroit Softball City finished second in the division to Cleveland with a record of 36–20, advancing to the playoffs against the South Jersey Athletics, winning 3-0 in the first round, and then defeating Cleveland 3–2 in the semi-finals. Detroit would lose in the UPSL World Series to Milwaukee 5–1 with the Schlitz led by World Series MVP Dick Laba (.667 BA). Dana Andry of Cleveland (.618, 65 HRs, 128 RBIs, 125 runs scored, 46-17 pitching) was the UPSL MVP and Charles Mitchell (59 HRs, 133 RBIs) of Detroit made the All-UPSL team. That was the last year for professional softball in the US as players once again returned to amateur leagues.

== Softball City record ==
Year	Record	Pct	Finish	Division	Playoffs	League
1982	39-20	.661	2nd	Eastern	World Series (runner-up)	UPSL
