= Columbus All-Americans =

Professional softball team

The Columbus All-Americans were a professional softball team that played in the American Professional Slo-Pitch League (APSPL) during the 1977 season. They played their home games at Franklin County Stadium in Columbus, Ohio.

== APSPL history ==
During the late 1970s and early 1980s, several men's professional slow-pitch softball leagues were formed in the United States to build on the growth and talent in the booming men's amateur game during this period. The American Professional Slo-Pitch League (APSPL) was the first such league, launching in an era of experimentation in professional sports leagues. The APSPL was formed in 1977 by former World Football League executive, and Columbus resident, Bill Byrne, who would go on to form the Women's Professional Basketball League. Former New York Yankees star Whitey Ford was the first league commissioner.

== All-Americans history ==
Columbus added local softball standouts Gary Pefley and Jud Boley as the season began, but the All-Americans would finish the season 16-40 (.286), 24 games behind the Central Division winning Kentucky Bourbons. The Detroit Caesars defeated the Baltimore Monuments 4–0 to win the inaugural pro softball World Series behind the hitting of series MVP Mike Nye. A triple crown by Chicago Storm catcher Benny Holt (.690, 89 HRs, 187 RBIs) was honored with the league MVP award.

Two All-Americans, shortstop Tom Pappas (.602, 45 RBIs, 68 runs scored) and third-baseman Bill Speaks (.532,17 HRs, 97 RBIs) made the 1977 All-APSPL squad. Ralph Calitri (.475, 9 HRs, 34 RBIs) and Goldie Rich (.445, 23 HRs, 69 RBIs, 62 runs scored) also had solid seasons in support of the All-American cause. The team suffered from poor attendance, had been financed by the league itself in 1977, a fact other teams did not know, and this jeopardize the World Series winner from receiving the promised $50,000 payout. The All-Americans were disbanded just as the 1978 APSPL season was set to begin.

== Columbus All-Americans record ==
Year	Record	Pct	Finish	Division	Playoffs	League
1977	16-40	.286	4th	Central	-	APSPL
