= New York Clippers =

Professional softball team

The New York Clippers were a professional softball team based in Mount Vernon, New York who played in the American Professional Slo-Pitch League (APSPL) in 1977. The Clippers played for only one year and disbanded after the 1977 season.

== League history ==
During the late 1970s and early 1980s, several men's professional slow-pitch softball leagues were formed in the United States to build on the growth and talent in the booming men's amateur game during this period. The American Professional Slo-Pitch League (APSPL) was the first such league, launching in an era of experimentation in professional sports leagues. The APSPL was formed in 1977 by former World Football League executive Bill Byrne, who would go on to form the Women's Professional Basketball League. Former New York Yankees player Whitey Ford was brought on to serve as league commissioner.

== New York Clippers ==
New York home games were played at Memorial Stadium in Mount Vernon, and the Clippers had signed local softball star, the "King of Slow Pitch," Jim Galloway. The team had offered Ron Swoboda, formerly of the New York Mets, the managerial position but he declined after comparing his salary offer to those the Detroit Caesars were paying former Detroit Tigers Norm Cash and Jim Northrup.

New York struggled to a 20-36 (.357) regular season record but advanced to the playoffs having finished second in the eastern division to the Baltimore Monuments. Baltimore beat the Clippers 2-0 (15-14, 10-9) in the best of three first-round of the APSPL playoffs. The Monuments would advance to the APSPL World Series, losing 4-0 to the Detroit Caesars with Mike Nye of Detroit honored as series MVP. Benny Holt (.690, 89 HRs, 187 RBIs) of the Chicago Storm won the triple crown and the inaugural league MVP award. Frank Cammailere (.520, 16 HRs, 54 RBIs) made the all-pro team for 1977 for New York. Contributing were Gary Richter (587, 24 HRs, 71 RBIs) who won a Player of the Week award, Mike Foley (.585, 32 HRs, 85 RBIs) and Jim Galloway (.455, 26 HRs, 58 RBIs). Other players who had a solid season included Larry Chiapetta (528, 12 HRs, 42 RBIs) and John Dunn (.525 BA).

The true story of the season is that there were essentially two Clippers teams in 1977. More than halfway through the season, on July 29, with 20 games to go, team General Manager Steve Bernheim placed the bulk of the second-place team on waivers and team manager Strat Scarlotos left with the players. Poor attendance had led to team owner Sandy Scheman asking the players to accept deferred payment on the season. The players refused, the team waived the professional roster and then signed the new Clippers, bringing on the Jets of Westchester, an amateur team who had won the 1976 New York state American Softball Association championship. New Clippers outfielder Tony DiCairano said "In the amateur tournaments we played in, the other teams would have one or two all-world players. The teams we're going against now have eight or nine." The new Clippers proceeded to then lose their first 8 games, finishing the season and were the team swept in the playoffs by Baltimore in the first-round. Jim Parker of the new Clippers hit .571 in 9 in his nine games. The team folded at the end of the season.

Several of the Clippers professionals would reappear in the APSPL the next season - Richter, Dunn, Foley, Galloway and Chiapetta with the Trenton Statesmen; Cammilere and pitcher Sam Sapienza with the New England Pilgrims. Mike Foley made the 1978 all-APSPL squad with Trenton.

Jim Galloway of the Clippers is a member of the American Softball Association Hall of Fame, inducted in 1985.

== New York Clippers record ==
Year	Record	Pct	Finish	Division	Playoffs	League
1977	20-36	.357	2nd	Eastern	-	APSPL
