= Cincinnati Suds =

Professional softball team in Ohio, US

The Cincinnati Suds were a professional softball team that played in two men's professional softball leagues at various stadiums in the Cincinnati, Ohio region from 1977 through 1982. The Suds, Pittsburgh Hardhats, Milwaukee Schlitz, and Kentucky Bourbons were the only franchises to play all six seasons of professional softball.

== Suds APSPL era ==
The Suds began play in the 1977 American Professional Slo-Pitch League (APSPL) with home games at Trechter Stadium in Cincinnati. The team name was chosen to honor the business history of the region with soap-making at Procter & Gamble as well as several local breweries. The APSPL was formed by former World Football League executive Bill Byrne, who would go on to form the Women's Professional Basketball League. Former New York Yankees player Whitey Ford was brought on to serve as league commissioner. The initial owners ran into financial difficulties mid-season and sold the team to local investors. Cincinnati finished the season with a 30-25 (.545) record, 9.5 games behind Kentucky and out of the inaugural APSPL playoffs. The Detroit Caesars won the 1977 APSPL World Series with Mike Nye of Detroit winning the series MVP. Benny Holt of the Chicago Storm won the triple crown and was honored as league MVP. Mike Applin (.563, 41 HRs, 104 RBIs) and Ricky Linz (.587 BA) of the Suds made the all-pro team. Mike O'Brien (.486, 12 HRs, 72 RBIs) had a solid season in support for the Suds.

Cincinnati improved greatly in 1978, winning the Central Division with a 40-24 (.625) record, advancing to the playoffs where they defeated the New England Pilgrims in the first round 2–1 (9–6, 4–9, 27–17) in what would become the only playoff victory in franchise history. Cincinnati exploded for 13 runs in the bottom of the 6th inning in game three to take the game 27–17. The Suds were defeated in the semi-finals by the Minnesota Norsemen 2–0. Detroit repeated as APSPL champions, Bert Smith of Detroit was the World Series MVP and Ron Ford of Detroit the league MVP. Donnie Rardin (.546, 8 HRs, 69 RBIs) and Mike O'Brien (.551, 22 HRs, 86 RBIs, league-leading 48 doubles) of the Suds made the all-APSPL team in 1978. Mike LaFever had an excellent season (.549 average), Mike Levangie (.446 BA), Jim Tuttle (.507, 22 HRs, 99 RBIs) and Greg Sandy (.528 BA) also performed well.

There was more ownership instability in 1978 as the league carried the Suds financially for part of the season. In stepped Larry Luebbers, who had built a Crosley Field replica in Union, Kentucky. The sale was made, the Suds now played in Kentucky, and had another winning record in 1979, finishing 34-30 (.531), in 2nd place in the Central to Kentucky. The Suds lost to the Detroit Caesars 3–2 in the first round of the playoffs, losing the final game in a hard-fought series 7-6 when the Suds 5-run rally in the 7th came up one run short of tying the game. The Milwaukee Schlitz took the APSPL title in 1979, with Schlitz player Rick Weiterman winning both the series and league MVP awards. Mike LaFever of the Suds made the all-league team. Of note, the APSPL World Series as the first live sports broadcast on the new start-up sports network ESPN. Detroit Caesar and former Detroit Tiger Jim Price was part of the broadcast team for the series.

In 1980, the Suds struggled in the final season of APSPL play with a 22–40 (.355) record as some players defected to the rival start-up league, including Greg Sandy, Jim Tuttle, Mike LaFever, and Mike O'Brien (see Rivermen section below). The Rochester Express won the league title, Don Brown of Rochester was the World Series MVP and Bill Gatti of Kentucky honored as the league MVP. No Cincinnati players won league-wide honors although catcher Mike Applin stood out with 17 home runs for the Suds, as did Dave Penick, who led the team in batting, and Clyde Dubois, leading the Suds in doubles. Former Cincinnati Reds player Darrel Chaney played for the Suds during the 1980 season.

== Cincinnati Rivermen ==
A rival league, the North American Softball League (NASL), was formed in 1980 by Cleveland Competitors owner Ted Stepien. Stepien owned a franchise, the Cincinnati Rivermen, that played at the Newport Recreation Center in Newport, Kentucky, and lured several players away from the Suds, including Mike LaFever, who served as team General Manager. Stepien placed NASL teams in several APSPL markets, including Lexington, Pittsburgh and Cincinnati. Stepien owned many of the NASL teams, with only Milwaukee and the Fort Wayne Huggie Bears having non-Stepien ownership. The owner of the Pittsburgh Hardhats of the APSPL brought an unsuccessful challenge in federal court in an attempt to prevent splitting the young professional sport.

The Rivermen missed the NASL playoffs with a 25–37 (.403) record but Mike LaFever (34 HRs, 88 RBIs) and player-manager Paul Campbell (.514 BA) made the NASL all-pro team for the Rivermen. Other former Suds who played for the Rivermen included Jim Kuhn and Mike Levangie. That league and franchise lasted only one season.

== Suds UPSL era ==
The APSPL combined with the NASL in 1981 to form the United Professional Softball League (UPSL) and the Suds moved to Ross Field in St. Bernard, Ohio. It was a rebuilt roster for 1981 with only three Suds returning from the 1980 squad (Mike Gomia, Mike Applin, and Mel Jackson). The Suds dominated the new league during the regular season with league-best 43–15 (.741) record, receiving a bye in the first round of the playoffs, only to be upset 3–2 (2–10, 6–7, 13–12, 4–3, 6–5) the Kentucky Bourbons in the semi-finals, losing the 5th game by a run, despite strong performances in the series by Brad Farrar (10–16, .625) and Hal Ward (9–15, .600). The Suds took the first two games, having elected to play the first two at home as the league allowed the better record to make the choice. The Suds took advantage, winning the first two games, and Suds pitcher Black Ron Jones said, "I told a guy from Channel 9 the other day that we were going to win it in three. Kentucky is good, but we're better."

The Bourbons responded by winning the next two, with Bourbon Dave Whitlock singling in the winning run in a 4–4 game in the bottom of the 7th of the 4th game in the series, only to have the post-game marred when Kentucky fans threw beer cans at Cincinnati players, leading Cincinnati manager Gerry Weidmann to declare, "I can't stand this place." Suds third-basemen Jim Kuhn, hit by a can, added, "If I had my choice, I wouldn't come back." In the 5th game, former Sud Mike O'Brien singled in Rick Wilson in the bottom of the seventh to deny the Suds a shot at the title. O'Brien poured salt in the Suds wound after the game, stating "They've got a great team, the best in the league. But we're fighters and they aren't. That explains how we could beat them by one run three straight times."

Kentucky would go on to win the league title, Greg Whitlock of Kentucky was the World Series MVP and teammate Bill Gatti the league MVP. Several Suds players made the all-UPSL team - Black Ron Jones (26-10 pitching record), Tony Salamone (.469, 62 runs scored), rookie of the year Hal Ward (524, 11 HRs) and Jim Tuttle (.434, 17 HRs, 83 RBIs).

The Suds performed well again in 1982 with a 34–28 (.548) record, again advancing to the UPSL playoffs, but were defeated 3–0 (11–4, 11–8, 13–4) in the first round by Milwaukee, who would go on to win the league title. Dick Laba of Milwaukee was the series MVP and Dana Andry of the Cleveland Competitors the UPSL MVP. Jim Tuttle (74 RBIs), Jim Kuhn and Black Ron Jones (24–12 pitching) stood out in 1982 for Cincinnati, but no Suds won league honors. The UPSL and the Suds folded after the conclusion of the 1982 season, ending professional play and returning players to the amateur leagues.

== Cincinnati Suds year-by-year record ==
Team	Year	Record	Pct	Finish	Division	Playoffs	League
Suds	1977	30-25	.545	3rd	Central	-	APSPL
Suds	1978	40-24	.625	1st	Central	Semi-Finals	APSPL
Suds	1979	34-30	.531	2nd	Central	1st Round	APSPL
Suds	1980	22-40	.355	5th	-	-	APSPL
Suds	1981	43-15	.741	1st	Western	Semi-Finals	UPSL
Suds	1982	34-28	.548	2nd	Western	1st Round	UPSL

== Cincinnati Rivermen record ==
Team	Year	Record	Pct	Finish	Division	Playoffs	League
Riverman	1980	25-37	.403	3rd	Eastern	-	NASL

== See also ==
- Sports in Cincinnati, Ohio
