= Lexington Stallions =

Professional softball team

The Lexington Stallions were a professional softball team who played at Southland Park in Lexington, Kentucky in the North American Softball League (NASL) during the 1980 season.

== Team history ==
Kentucky was represented by the Kentucky Bourbons, who played in Louisville in the first professional league, the American Professional Slo-Pitch League (APSPL), beginning with the founding of that league in 1977. But 1980 was a year of division in professional softball as the Cleveland Stepien's Competitors, the Fort Wayne Huggie Bears and Milwaukee broke away from the APSPL to form a new league (North American Softball League) in 1980, under the leadership of Cleveland owner Ted Stepien. The Bourbons continued in the reduced numbers of the APSPL. Stepien placed NASL teams in several APSPL markets, including Cincinnati and Pittsburgh, also placing a team, the Lexington Stallions, in nearby Lexington, Kentucky. Stepien owned many of the NASL teams, including the Stallions. The owner of the Pittsburgh Hardhats of the APSPL brought a challenge in federal court in an attempt to prevent splitting the young professional sport. Donnie Rardin, a former Bourbon who was now changing teams for the 4th time in the 4 years of professional softball, was brought on by Stepien and would play for and serve as General Manager for Lexington, former Bourbon Dave Bair managed the team, and ex-Bourbons Phil Schroer and Phil Gowdy joined them on the Stallions.

The Stallions had an unremarkable run in 1980, finishing the season with a 30-32 (.486) record, good for 3rd place in the NASL Western Division, 18 games the Milwaukee Schlitz. Milwaukee would go on to win the 1980 NASL World Series 5–2 over the Detroit Auto Kings with Ken Parker (.586 BA) of Milwaukee honored as Series MVP. Ron Olesiak (.555, 34 HRs, 124 RBIs) of Chicago Nationwide Advertising was the NASL league MVP. Donnie Rardin (.548, 20 doubles, 14 triples) was the lone Stallion to make the all-NASL squad for 1980. Former Bourbons Rardin, Phil Schroer, and Phil Gowdy represented Lexington at the mid-season all-star game in Willoughby, Ohio. The Stallions also featured former Bourbon Terry Davis, Jim Dunn, who had been signed by the Dallas Cowboys in 1970, Bendal Bagby, and Thom Deskins, who had played minor league baseball in the Chicago Cubs organization.

After the season, the NASL and the APSPL officially merged, but only the Milwaukee Schlitz would go to the new United Professional Softball League (UPSL) and the Stallions disbanded. The UPSL folded after the 1982 season, bringing an end to the professional softball era for men in the United States.

== Lexington Stallions record ==
Year	Record	Pct	Finish	Division	Playoffs	League
1980	30-32	..486	3rd	Midwestern	-	NASL
