= Pittsburgh Hardhats (softball) =

Professional softball team

- Sport: Slow-pitch softball
- First season: 1977
- Last season: 1983
- League: APSPL 1977-80; UPSL 1981-82
- Based in: Pittsburgh, Pennsylvania
- Owner: Jim and Josephine Dilorio

The Pittsburgh Hardhats were a professional softball team that played in two men's professional softball leagues from 1977 through 1982. The Hardhats, Cincinnati Suds and the Kentucky Bourbons were the only franchises to play all 6 seasons of professional softball.

== League history ==
Pittsburgh began playing in the inaugural 1977 American Professional Slo-Pitch League (APSPL) season. The APSPL was formed by former World Football League executive Bill Byrne, who would go on to form the Women's Professional Basketball League. Former New York Yankees player Whitey Ford was brought on to serve as league commissioner. The team changed venues twice during its existence, playing the 1977 season and part of the 1978 season at Munhall Municipal Stadium in Munhall, Pennsylvania; finishing the 1978 season at Morrell Field in Aliquippa, Pennsylvania, where the team remained throughout the 1981 season; and ending its playing life at LaRussa Field, Sokol Club, Lower Burrell, Pennsylvania in 1982. After the APSPL disbanded after the 1980 season, the Hardhats joined the United Professional Softball League (UPSL), where they played through 1982 when professional softball came to an end in the United States.

== The APSPL era ==
The Hardhats came in 3rd place in the Eastern Division of the 1977 APSPL Eastern Division with a record of 17–37, 16.5 games behind the Baltimore Monuments. Tom Miller (.544, 52 HRs, 124 RBIs) of the Hardhats made the 1977 all-pro team, Benny Holt of the Chicago Storm won the league MVP with the Detroit Caesars taking the first ever professional softball World Series title. Jim Nelson (81-166, .488, 41 HRs, 100 RBIs) of the Hardhats had a strong season as did Gary Smith (.419, 6 HRs, 37 RBIs), Lou Abel (.438, 1 HRs, 32 RBIs) and Greg Birko (.465 BA, 65 runs scored).

Pittsburgh struggled again in 1978, finishing in 4th place in the Central Division, 29–35, and 11 games back of division winning Cincinnati Suds. Hardhat Denny Brown (.608, 1 HRs, 46 RBIs, 101 runs scored) made the al-pro team and Ron Ford won the league MVP for the repeating champion Caesars Hardhats have a strong season included Roger Snatchko (.578, 6 HRs, 81 RBIs), Barry Glaser (.550, 2 HRs, 59 RBIs) and Fred Ryan (.393, 21 HRs, 67 RBIs).

Pittsburgh took a step forward in 1979 with a 33–31 record, advancing to the playoffs where they lost in the first round 3-2 (6-7, 0–4, 10–9, 10–3, 5–1) in a best of five series to the Rochester Zeniths. Rick Weiterman of the World Series winning Milwaukee Schlitz was the league MVP with the series being the first live broadcast on the start-up network ESPN. Making the all-APSPL team in 1979 from Pittsburgh were Barry Glaser (.527 BA) and Denny Brown (.504 BA). First-baseman Joe Aversa made the mid-season All-Star team and Greg Birko (.478 BA) has another strong campaign.

Cleveland Stepien's Competitors, the Fort Wayne Huggie Bears and Milwaukee broke away from the APSPL to form a new league (North American Softball League) in 1980, under the leadership of Cleveland owner Ted Stepien, while the Hardhats continued in the reduced numbers of the APSPL. Stepien placed NASL teams in several APSPL markets, including Cincinnati, Kentucky and Pittsburgh, starting a team called the Pittsburgh Champions. Stepien owned many of the NASL teams, including the Champions. The Champions played at LaRussa Field, Sokol Club in Lower Burrell, just outside of Pittsburgh. The Hardhats owner Jim DiIorio brought a challenge in federal court in an attempt to prevent splitting the young professional sport. The Hardhats also brought a legal challenge against new Champions player and General Manager Roger Snatchko for breach of contract as he had been under contract with the Hardhats previously. That lawsuit was withdrawn as a salary amount was not specified in the Hardhat contract. Snatchko would lead the Champions but tensions with Stepien remained as he tried to lure talent away from the APSPL teams, including the Hardhats. The Champions added Chuck Lazar, a local football stand-out from Allegheny College, who had spent the previous two seasons playing with the Hardhats. Lazar would play briefly for the Champions before leaving for the Pittsburgh Steelers training camp.

Meanwhile, the Hardhats had their best season in 1980, finishing with a 44-19 (.698) record, trailing only the Kentucky Bourbons. Pittsburgh upset Kentucky in the first round 3-2 (5-10, 7–5, 4-10, 5-14, 4–1) to advance to their first APSPL World Series, where they were swept 3-0 (2-3, 11–3, 12–9) by the Rochester Express. Several Hardhats made the all-league team - Greg Birko (29-13 pitching), Jim Foxy Nelson (17 HRs, 68 RBIs), Denny Brown (.492 BA), Pat Benzing and Randy Elliott (.470 BA). Bill Gatti of Kentucky was honored as league MVP in the last APSPL season.

== The UPSL years ==
The North American Softball League (NASL) lasted for only one season, and the APSPL then merged with the NASL to form the United Professional Softball League (UPSL) in 1981. The NASL Pittsburgh Champions had disbanded with the merger. Pittsburgh struggled in the first year of the new league in 1981, finishing in last place of the Western Division, 23-35 (.397), 20 games behind the Cincinnati Suds. John Regent (21 doubles) of Pittsburgh made the all-pro team. Bill Gatti of the World Series winning Kentucky Bourbons was the league MVP. Jim Nelson (16 HRs, 64 RBIs) and Greg Birko held down the mound with an 11–21 record on the year.

The team would move to the Champions former home for 1982, LaRussa Field, Sokol Club, Lower Burrell, Pennsylvania. The Hardhats had worse fortune in 1982, finishing with a record of 8-52 (.133), 36.5 games back of the division winning Cleveland Competitors. No Hardhats won league honors, Dana Andry of Cleveland was the league MVP and the Milwaukee Schlitz defeated the Detroit Auto Kings to win the last professional softball title.

== Pittsburgh Hardhats year-by-year record ==
Year	Record	Pct	Finish	Division	Playoffs	League
1977	17-37	.315	3rd	Eastern	-	APSPL
1978	29-35	.453	4th	Central	-	APSPL
1979	33-31	.516	4th	Central	1st Round	APSPL
1980	44-19	.698	2nd	-	World Series (runner-up)	APSPL
1981	23-35	.397	4th	Western	-	UPSL
1982	8-52	.133	5th	Eastern	-	UPSL

== See also ==
- Pittsburgh Champions
