= Rochester Zeniths =

Rochester Zeniths is the name of:

- Rochester Zeniths (basketball), a defunct professional basketball team that was based in Rochester, New York.
- Rochester Zeniths (softball), a defunct professional softball team that was based in Rochester, New York.
