= Philadelphia Athletics (disambiguation) =

Philadelphia Athletics (1901–1954) was a baseball team in the American League.

Philadelphia Athletics may also refer to:

- Philadelphia Athletics (1860–1876), a baseball team in the National Association 1871–1875 and National League 1876
- Philadelphia Athletics (American Association), a baseball team in the American Association 1882–1890
- Philadelphia Athletics (1890–1891), a baseball team in the Players' League 1890 and the American Association 1891
- Philadelphia Athletics (softball), softball team that played in the APSPL 1978-1979, later named the South Jersey Athletics
- Philadelphia Athletics (NFL), a football team in the National Football League in 1902
- Philadelphia Athletics (minor league), minor league baseball teams that played between 1877 and 1900

== See also ==
- Kansas City Athletics, where the franchise played from 1955–1967
- Oakland Athletics, 1968–2024
- Athletics (baseball), the current franchise, 2025–present
