= Minnesota Norsemen =

Professional softball team

The Minnesota Norsemen were a professional softball team that played in the American Professional Slo-Pitch League (APSPL) during the 1978 and 1979 seasons. The team had played as the Minnesota Goofy's in the 1977 season, changing names for 1978. They played their home games at Midway Stadium in St. Paul, Minnesota.

== League history ==
During the late 1970s and early 1980s, several men's professional slow-pitch softball leagues were formed in the United States to build on the growth and talent in the booming men's amateur game during this period. The American Professional Slo-Pitch League (APSPL) was the first such league, launching in an era of experimentation in professional sports leagues. The APSPL was formed in 1977 by former World Football League executive Bill Byrne who would go on to form the Women's Professional Basketball League. Former New York Yankees star Whitey Ford was the first league commissioner.

== Minnesota Goofy's ==
The Minnesota Goofy's, named after a local bar, played in the APSPL in 1977, finishing with a record of 24-30 (.445) and out of the inaugural playoffs. Initial owner Joe Houle ran into financial challenges running the team and sold to Steve Doran mid-season. The Goofys had lost 16 games in a row, Doran fired Manager Dennis Willey and brought in Terry Fredericks to lead the team to finish the season. Minnesota Joe Russell (35 HRs, 111 RBIs) and Gene Parrish (batted .622 with 115 runs scored) made the 1977 all-league team for Minnesota. Bob Boyson (.578 BA), Dale Palm (42 HRs) and Mike Perfetti (437, 33 HRs, 68 RBIs) had solid seasons in support for the Goofy's. Benny Holt of the Chicago Storm (softball) won the triple crown and league MVP, with the Detroit Caesars winning the first professional softball World Series trophy. Minnesota in 1977 briefly featured former Minnesota Twin and 1965 American League MVP Zoilo Versalles, who played until early July before hanging up his softball spikes. The Goofy's were sold mid-season and renamed the Norseman for 1978.

== Minnesota Norsemen ==
With the sale of the Goofys, new ownership finalized a rebranding as the Minnesota Norsemen and greatly improved the team on-the-field for 1978.

The Norseman finished the 1978 season with a record of 40-24 (.625), receiving a first round bye in the APSPL playoffs. They defeated the Cincinnati Suds in the second round 2–0 to advance to the professional softball World Series. Minnesota lost to the Detroit Caesars 4–0 with Bert Smith honored as series MVP. Ron Ford of Detroit was the league MVP. John Locke (.582, 65 HRs, 136 RBIs), Bob McMahon (.556, 59 HRs, 120 RBIs), Joe Russell (53 HRs), Dale Palm (.614, 70 HRs, 166 RBIs) and Gene Parrish (.634 BA, 23 HRs, 90 RBIs)) of Minnesota made the all-league team. Lou Boone hit 45 home-runs for the Norsemen and Gordie Handevidt batted .541 in support.

The team added APSPL all-pro Buddy Haines from the Chicago Storm in the off-season, but Minnesota just missed out on the playoffs in 1979 with a 32-32 (.500) record, 8.5 game behind Midwestern Division winners Milwaukee Schlitz. Milwaukee defeated the Kentucky Bourbons in the World Series 5–3. The series were broadcast nationwide as the first televised event on the new start-up sports network ESPN.

Gene Parrish was the only Norseman to make the APSPL all-star team in 1979, batting .511 on the season. Parrish, John Locke (33 HRs) and manager Rich Finke represented Minnesota on the mid-season All-Star roster. Bob Lurtsema, former Minnesota Vikings defensive end, pitched for the Norseman in 1979.

Political infighting and inconsistent commitment from other team owners in the APSPL led Norsemen owner Steve Doran to disband the team at the end of the season.

== Minnesota year-by-year record ==
Year	Team name	Record	Pct	Finish	Division	Playoffs	League
1977	Goofy's	24-30	.445	3rd	Midwest	-	APSPL
1978	Norsemen	40-24	.625	2nd	Midwest	World Series (runner-up)	APSPL
1979	Norsemen	32-32	.500	3rd	Midwest	-	APSPL
