= Chicago Storm =

Chicago Storm may refer to:

- Chicago Storm (soccer), a defunct professional soccer team that played in Chicago, Illinois
- Chicago Storm (softball), a defunct professional softball team that played in Chicago, Illinois
