= Rochester Express =

Professional softball team

The Rochester Express, originally named the Rochester Zeniths, were a professional softball team that played in two professional softball leagues from 1978 through 1982 at various locations in the Rochester, New York area.

== Rochester Zeniths ==
The Rochester Zeniths were organized in the fall of 1978 to play in the second year of the American Professional Slow-Pitch League (APSPL). The APSPL was formed in 1977 by former World Football League executive Bill Byrne, who would go on to found the Women's Professional Basketball League. Former New York Yankees player Whitey Ford served as the first league commissioner. The Zeniths were owned by Dick Hill who owned Hill TV, a Rochester electronics store that sold Zenith brand televisions, hence the team name. Hill also owned the Rochester Zeniths franchise in the Continental Basketball Association. The Zeniths softball team played at Harris Whalen Park in Penfield, New York for the 1978 and 1979 seasons in the APSPL.

The Zeniths built a roster from the area amateur teams, including former San Francisco Giant minor-leaguer Joe Costello. The team then added the colorful Cal Carmen from Detroit before the season began. Carmen played first-base and would often come within 10-feet of the batter during the pitch and taunt and whistle at the batter. Even with the trickery, Rochester struggled in the 1978 season, finishing with a record of 22–42 (.344), 16 games behind the Eastern Division winning New England Pilgrims. The Detroit Caesars won their second APSPL World Series with Bert Smith of Detroit winning the series MVP. Ron Ford of the Caesars won the league MVP. Rick Page of the Zeniths was named to the all-league team. Bob Goodlow (.578, 6 HRs, 81 RBIs) and Pete Castle (.493, 18 HRs, 59 RBIs) had solid seasons for Rochester. Carmen (.307, 5 HRs, 22 RBIs) struggled in the adjustment to professional play, despite being the highest paid Zenith, and was released on July 31 when Rochester when the team was eliminated from the playoff picture.

The Zeniths improved greatly in 1979, winning the Eastern Division with a 35–27 (.565) record, advancing to the playoffs. Rochester beat the Pittsburgh Hardhats in the first round 3–2, but were defeated by the Kentucky Bourbons 3–1 in the semi-finals. The Milwaukee Schlitz would then beat the Kentucky Bourbons 5–3 in the APSPL World Series, broadcast nationwide on the new start-up sports network ESPN. Zenith Rick Page (482, 24 HRs, 94 RBIs) made the 1978 all-APSPL team with Bob Goodlow (.558, 20 HRs, 59 RBIs) and Pete Castle (.493, 18 HRs, 59 RBIs) had solid seasons in support.

Don Brown (.536, 38 RBIs, 43 runs scored, 30–21 pitching) of the Zeniths was named to the all-APSPL team for 1979, with Brown, Rick Palmiero, Rick Page and Jerry Lasponera making the mid-season All-Star team. Zeniths manager Mike DeCillis served as a coach for the Eastern All-Star team. Rick Weiterman of Milwaukee was both the World Series and league MVP in 1979.

== 1980 APSPL Champions ==
The rival North American Softball League (NASL) formed in 1980, splitting professional softball, but Rochester continued play in the APSPL. The Zeniths had been sold to new owners who renamed the team the Rochester Express in 1980. The team changed their home stadium to the Softball Centre in Scottsville, NY. The Express limped to a 30–34 (.469) record and would make a managerial change mid-season to try to stir the team, with Manager Mike Decillis returning full-time to playing field and second-baseman Don Fazio moving taking the reins.

The team advanced to the playoffs, defeating New England 3–0 in the first round to move to the APSPL World Series against Pittsburgh.

Rochester upset the heavily favored Hardhats 5–4 (2–8, 8–7, 10–4, 2–5, 7–9, 15–16, 7–6, 9–1, 8–2) in the 9-game series, behind strong hitting from Tom Zaccarado (.500, 2 HRs, 10 RBIs) and Steve Re (.444, 5 HRs, 9 RBIs), and series MVP Don Brown on the mound (5–4 pitching). The Express came back from a 2–4 deficit in the series and Pittsburgh was one win from the title with a 3-run lead heading to the bottom of the final inning in game 7. Rochester rallied in the bottom of the 7th as Jerry Lasponara, with two out in a now tied game, capped the rally by driving home Don Fazio for the 7–6 win to force another game.

The Express rode the momentum to a 9–1 blowout victory in game 8, and with Steve Re belting his 5th home-run of the series, Zaccarado tripling in 3 runs, and a triple from Rich Brown launching the offense, the Express took the series with an 8–2 series winning victory in the 9th game, capping an improbable come-back and title run.

Express players Pete Castle (435, 9 HRs, 57 RBIs,) Rich Brown (.494, 2 HRs, 22 RBIs) and, rookie of the year Bob Schuster (.421, 21 HRs, 59 RBI) made the all-league team in 1980. Schuster missed the playoffs as he was with the Alfred University football team as a Division III All-American 4th-year starting QB for the Saxons.

== UPSL Era ==
The APSPL and the NASL then merged to form the United Professional Softball League in 1981, although only Milwaukee came to the new league from the NASL as the other franchises disbanded. The Express finished with a record of 30–28 (.517), second place in the Eastern Division behind the South Jersey Athletics. New England beat Rochester 3–1 in the first round of the playoffs where the Pilgrims lost to Kentucky 5–3 behind the bat of World Series MVP Greg Whitlock. Bill Gatti of the Bourbons was named the 1981 UPSL MVP. Tom Zaccarado (.474, 15 HRs, 62 RBIs) of Rochester made the all-league team. Steve Re (.414, 15 HRs) and Rick Page ( 23 HRs, 64 RBIs) had productive seasons for the Express and Mike DeCillis went 16–12 pitching. 1980 home-run leader Bob Schuster played sparingly, having taken an out-of-state job after graduating college.

The Express returned to Harris Whalen Park in Penfield for 1982 UPSL season and also played some home games at Silver Stadium in the city of Rochester. Rochester struggled to a 24–40 (.375) record, finishing 22.5 games behind the division-winning Cleveland Competitors. No Express player made the 1982 all-league team although Pete Castle (50, 38 HRS, 74 RBIs) had a solid year. Milwaukee defeated Detroit Softball City in the 1982 World Series, with Dick Laba of the Schlitz taking the Series MVP trophy and Dana Andry honored as league MVP. The UPSL and the Express folded at the end of the season ending the era of men's professional softball in the US.

Former Zenith first-baseman Cal Carmen is a member of the United States Slowpitch Softball Association (USSSA) Hall of Fame.

== Rochester year-by-year record ==
Year	Team name	Record	Pct	Finish	Division	Playoffs	League
1978	Zeniths	22–42	.344	4th	Eastern	–	APSPL
1979	Zeniths	35–27	.565	1st	Eastern	Semi-Finals	APSPL
1980	Express	30–34	.469	3rd	–	Champions	APSPL
1981	Express	30–28	.517	2nd	Eastern	1st Round	UPSL
1982	Express	24–40	.375	4th	Midwest	–	UPSL
