= Midway Stadium =

Former baseball park in Saint Paul, Minnesota

Coordinates: 44°58′21″N 93°10′26″W

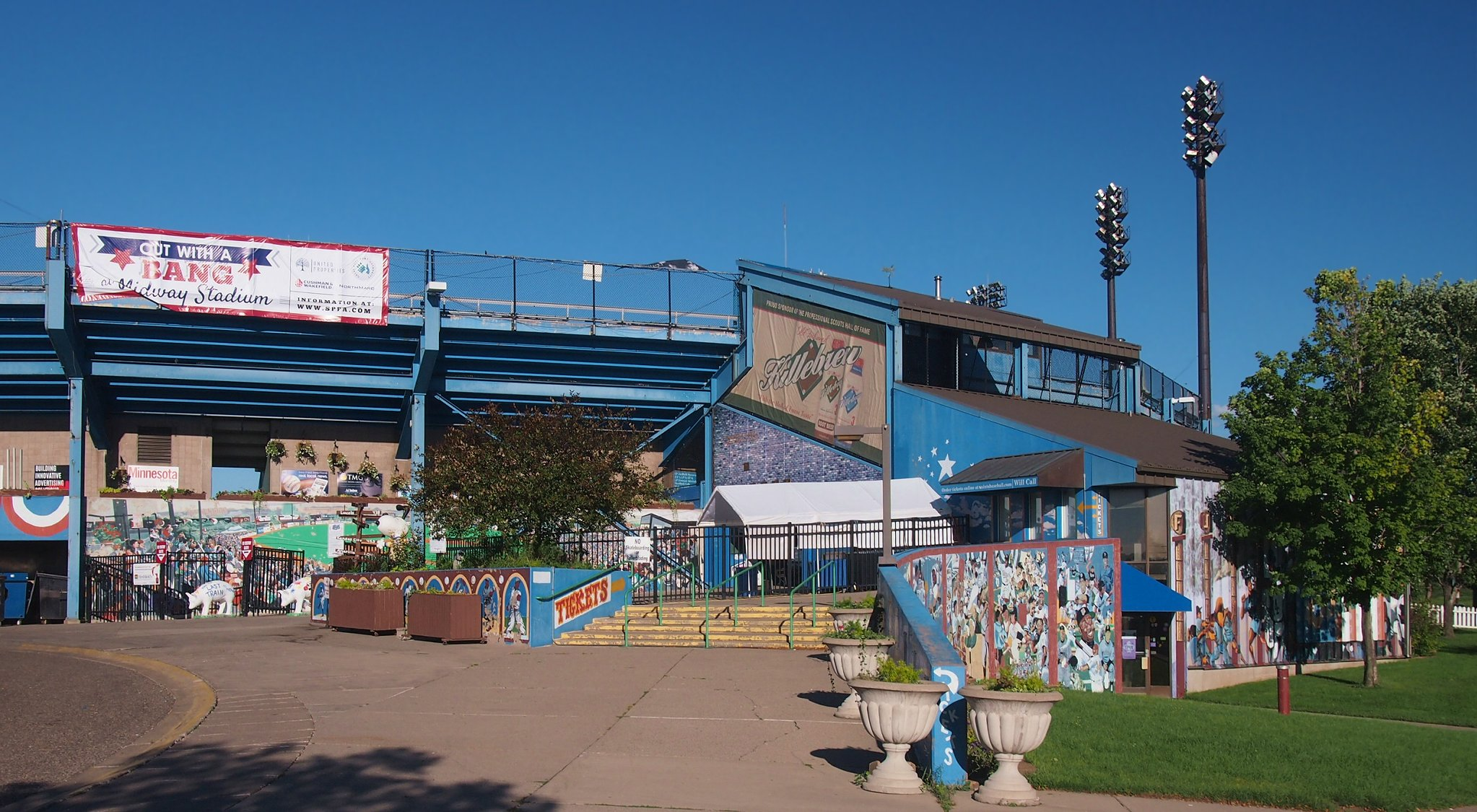
- Interactive map of Midway Stadium
- Former names: Municipal Stadium (1982–1993)
- Location: 1771 Energy Park Drive; St. Paul, Minnesota 55108
- Owner: City of St. Paul
- Operator: St. Paul Parks and Recreation
- Capacity: 2,100 (1982–1993); 5,000 (1993–1995); 6,069 (1995–2014)
- Field size: Left Field: 320 ft (98 m); Center Field: 400 ft (120 m); Right Field: 320 ft (98 m)

Construction
- Opened: September 1982
- Demolished: June 2015
- Cost: $3 million USD

Tenants
- Hamline University (MIAC) (1982–2014); St. Paul Saints (NoL/AA) (1993–2014)

Midway Stadium was the name of two different minor league baseball parks in Saint Paul, Minnesota, United States, both now demolished. The name derived from the location of the stadium in Saint Paul's Midway area, so named because it is roughly halfway between the downtowns of Minneapolis and Saint Paul.

== First stadium ==
The first Midway Stadium was the home of the St. Paul Saints of the American Association from 1957–1960. It was located at 1000 North Snelling Avenue, on the east side of that street. It was built with just a small uncovered and presumably expandable grandstand. It was intended to compete with Metropolitan Stadium for attracting a major league baseball team, but the already-larger capacity of "The Met" doomed Midway Stadium. It was abandoned for professional baseball once the Twins arrived in 1961 and displaced both the Saints and the Minneapolis Millers. It was used for by the Minnesota Norsemen professional softball team of the American Professional Slow Pitch Softball League (APSPL) for their 1977-1979 seasons. It was also used as a Minnesota Vikings practice field for the next 20 years, and finally demolished in 1981 to make way for the Energy Park. That development, with all new streets and various buildings, rubbed out any trace of the ballpark's existence.

== Second stadium ==
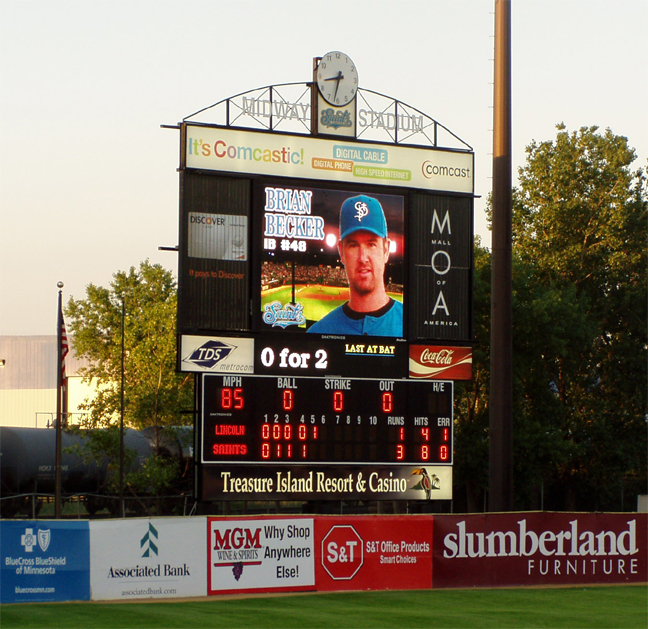
The scoreboard at Midway Stadium

The second Midway Stadium was built in 1982 at roughly half the size of its namesake. It was located at 1771 Energy Park Drive. It was on the north side of the road, just west of Snelling, complemented by the Burlington Northern tracks to the north just beyond left field. Thus, it was about a mile west of the first Midway Stadium site. The ballpark started out in life as Municipal Stadium. It was home of Hamline University's baseball team. Despite its baseball configurations, some small private schools in St. Paul played football games at Midway in the fall. When Mike Veeck and Bill Murray revived the Saints and also the independent Northern League in 1993, they set up shop there, at the soon-rechristened Midway Stadium. Midway Stadium was also used, occasionally, for rock concerts and other events. In April 2014 it was announced that pioneering alternative rock band The Replacements would hold a hometown reunion concert at the venue on September 13, 2014.

The St. Paul Saints use the marketing slogan "Fun Is Good." Team co-owner Mike Veeck previously characterized the team's former home, Midway Stadium, as "the ugliest ballpark in America." Mike Veeck is the son of Bill Veeck Jr., a Major League Baseball executive known for several innovations, including the 1937 planting of the ivy at Wrigley Field.

2014 was the final season for both Hamline and the Saints at Midway Stadium. Both teams moved into the new ballpark CHS Field in time for the 2015 season. Midway Stadium was torn down in 2015. The 12-acre site will be used for an office or warehouse development, which is in line with the industrial area that surrounds the stadium.

== Dimensions ==
Midway Stadium (I)

- Seating capacity – 10,250
- Left Field – 321 ft (98 m).
- Left Center Field – 379 ft (116 m).
- Center Field – 410 ft (120 m).
- Right Center Field – 379 ft (116 m).
- Right Field – 321 ft (98 m).

Midway Stadium (II)

- Seating capacity – 6,069
- Left Field – 320 ft (98 m).
- Center Field – 400 ft (120 m).
- Right Field – 320 ft (98 m).

Events and tenants
Preceded by first venue	Home of the St. Paul Saints; 1993–2014	Succeeded by CHS Field
Preceded by first venue	Host of the NoL All-Star Game; Midway Stadium; 1997	Succeeded by Lewis and Clark Park
Preceded by Sioux Falls Stadium	Host of the AAB All-Star Game; Midway Stadium; 2008	Succeeded by QuikTrip Park
