= New England Pilgrims =

New England Pilgrims may refer to:

- New England College Pilgrims, the athletic program for New England College in Henniker, New Hampshire
- New England Pilgrims (softball), a defunct professional softball team that was based in New Haven, Connecticut

== See also ==
- Pilgrims (Plymouth Colony), the English settlers who came to North America on the Mayflower and established the Plymouth Colony in what is today Plymouth, Massachusetts
