= Philadelphia Athletics (softball) =

Professional softball team

The Philadelphia Athletics, later named the South Jersey Athletics, were a professional softball team that played in two professional softball leagues at Veterans Stadium in Philadelphia (1978), Dyer Field in Wilmington, Delaware (1979-1980) and finally the Cjonacki Sports Complex in Berlin, New Jersey (1981-1982).

== League history ==
During the late 1970s and early 1980s, several men's professional slow-pitch softball leagues were formed in the United States to build on the growth and talent in the booming men's amateur game during this period. The American Professional Slo-Pitch League (APSPL) was the first such league, launching in an era of experimentation in professional sports leagues. The APSPL was formed in 1977 by former World Football League front-office executive Bill Byrne, who would go on to found the Women's Professional Basketball League. Former New York Yankees star Whitey Ford was the first APSPL commissioner. The Philadelphia Athletics joined the APSPL in the 1978 season. In 1980, three teams, Fort Wayne, Milwaukee and Cleveland broke away to form the North American Softball League (NASL) under the leadership of Ted Stepien, who owned 6 of the 8 teams in the league (only Fort Wayne and Milwaukee had non-Stepien ownership), while the APSPL continued with just 6 teams. Philadelphia remained in the APSPL. The NASL lasted one season.

In 1981 the APSPL merged with NASL to create the United Professional Softball League (UPSL), but only the Milwaukee franchise came from the NASL to the new league as the other NASL teams folded. The Athletics moved to New Jersey in 1981 and became the South Jersey Athletics. The merged league competed for two seasons, before disbanding after the 1982 season, ending the pro era of men's softball.

The Athletics had a nomadic existence, starting play in 1978 at Veterans Stadium in Philadelphia with a capacity of over 60,000. The A's, with a high attendance mark of 4700 spectators, lost over $200,000 under the direction of President Valentino Piacentino. Seeking a more stable situation, the team moved to Wilmington, Delaware, but suffered from poor attendance. The team eventually found a home in New Jersey, changed the name from the Philadelphia Athletics to the South Jersey Athletics, and the franchise stabilized until professional softball played ended in 1982.

== Philadelphia Athletics ==
The Athletics brought on former Philadelphia Phillies star Johnny Callison to serve as player-coach but he would resign after a 10-25 start, citing the need to return to his business commitments. The team struggled on-the field at Veterans Stadium in 1978, finishing the season 29-35 (.453), 2nd in the Eastern Division to the New England Pilgrims advancing to the playoffs with their 2nd place divisional finish. Philadelphia lost to the Cleveland Jaybirds in the first round of the playoffs 2–1 (10-16, 8-4, 26-22), dropping the third game in a slug-fest Cleveland took 26–22. The Detroit Caesars won the 1977 APSPL World Series with Mike Nye of Detroit winning the series MVP. Benny Holt of the Chicago Storm won the triple crown and was honored as league MVP. Johnny Dollar (.571, 15 HRs, 81 RBIs) was the Athletics sole representative on the 1978 All-APSPL team. Cliff Yeager (.621, 3 HRs, 48 RBIs), Pete Simonelli (.500, 9 HRs, 31 RBIs, 65 runs scored) and Lawrence "Boom Boom" Hutcherson (.486, 43 HRs, 125 RBIs), who had come to the Athletics from the defunct Baltimore Monuments, had solid seasons in support. The Athletics also featured former National Football League star, and Pennsylvania native, Billy "White Shoes" Johnson (.349, 4 HRs, 19 RBIs). Poor attendance and financial losses playing at Veterans Stadium had owner Butch Piacentino looking for a new home by the end of the season.

The team moved to Delaware in 1979 but retained the Philadelphia Athletics name. The move did not benefit the win-loss record as the Athletics struggled to a 23-41 (.359) finish, 3rd place in the Eastern Division, 13 games behind the Rochester Zeniths (softball), and out of the playoffs. Ron Dorsey and Lawrence Hutcherson made the mid-season All-Star team. The Milwaukee Schlitz took the APSPL title in 1979 over Kentucky, with Schlitz player Rick Weiterman winning both the series and league MVP awards. Hutcherson (.533, 12 HRs, 57 RBIs) and Dorsey (.433, 16 HRs, 77 RBIs) had strong seasons for the Athletics.

1980 was a similar struggle as the Athletics went 21-43 (.328) and out of the playoffs as Hutcherson and Dorsey elected to play for the York Barbell amateur club in the National Slo Pitch Conference, a prestigious amateur competition . The Rochester Express won the league title, Don Brown of Rochester was the World Series MVP and Bill Gatti of Kentucky was honored as the league MVP. A's Infielder Gary Hartman made the all-APSPL team for 1980. John Spadaccino (14 HRs, 46 RBIs) and the windmill-style delivery of pitcher Sam Sapienza had come from the disbanded Trenton Champales in the off-season and both had solid seasons.

== South Jersey Athletics ==
The APSPL combined with the NASL in 1981 to form the United Professional Softball League (UPSL) and the Athletics rebranded as the South Jersey Athletics with a move to New Jersey. It was a stellar season for the Athletics, finishing the year 35-21 (.625), winners of the Eastern Division, and earning a first-round playoff bye as a result. The Athletics stumbled against New England, who entered the playoffs with a .400 record, losing 3–2 (4-8, 12-7, 0-5, 5-3, 16-6) in the semi-finals despite strong performances by Ron Dorsey (4 HRs) and Bobby Bryant (3 HRs). Kentucky would win the league title, beating New England in the championship, Greg Whitlock of Kentucky was the World Series MVP and teammate Bill Gatti the league MVP. Ron Dorsey (.511, 34 HRs, 75 RBIs) and Bob Bryant (.464, 20 HRs, 64 RBIs) made the all-UPSL team. Mike Kolb (.456, 29 HRs, 74 RBIs), John Spadaccino (.500, 26 HRs, 64 RBIs) and Sam Sapienza (19-17 pitching) had excellent seasons for South Jersey.

1982 was another solid campaign as the Athletics finished the season 35-25 (.583), 3rd place in the highly competitive Eastern Division, 9.5 games back of the Cleveland Competitors. South Jersey would get swept 3–0 (18-11, 16-15, 18-14) the first round by Detroit Softball City. Milwaukee defeated Detroit 5–1 in the World Series with Dick Laba of Milwaukee the series MVP. Dana Andry of Cleveland was the UPSL MVP. Ron Dorsey (.547, 47 HRs, 95 RBIs) was again named to the all-UPSL for the Athletics. Mike Kolb (.521, 46 HRs, 114 RBIs), Bob Bryant (.495, 27 HRs, 81 RBIs) and John Spadaccino (.481, 27 HRs, 55 RBIs) provided additional power for South Jersey in 1982. The UPSL and the Athletics folded after the conclusion of the 1982 season, ending professional play and returning players to the amateur leagues.

== Athletics year-by-year record ==
Year	Team name	Record	Pct	Finish	Division	Playoffs	League
1978	Philadelphia Athletics	28-36	.453	2nd	Eastern	1st Round	APSPL
1979	Philadelphia Athletics	23-41	.359	3rd	Eastern	-	APSPL
1980	Philadelphia Athletics	21-43	.328	6th	-	-	APSPL
1981	South Jersey Athletics	35-21	.625	1st	Eastern	Semi-Finals	UPSL
1982	South Jersey Athletics	35-25	.583	3rd	Eastern	1st Round	UPSL

== See also ==
- Sports in Philadelphia
