= Gene Hiser =

American baseball player (born 1948)

- Outfielder
- Born: December 11, 1948 (age 77); Baltimore, Maryland, U.S.
- Batted: Left Threw: Left

MLB debut
- August 20, 1971, for the Chicago Cubs

Last MLB appearance
- September 23, 1975, for the Chicago Cubs

MLB statistics
- At bats: 263
- RBI: 18
- Home runs: 1
- Batting average: .202
- Stats at Baseball Reference

Teams
- Chicago Cubs (1971–1975)

Gene Taylor Hiser (born December 11, 1948) is an American former professional baseball outfielder who played five seasons for the Chicago Cubs from 1971 through 1975. He was drafted in the 1st round (19th pick) of the 1970 amateur draft out of the University of Maryland. Hiser was an American Baseball Coaches Association All-American in and a Sporting News First-Team All-American selection in 1970.

Hiser went right to the Triple-A Cubs affiliate in Tacoma in 1970, hitting .250 in 232 at-bats. He played briefly with Tacoma in 1971, and spent a portion of the 1971 season on active military duty prior to joining the Cubs for 17 games, hitting .207.

Hiser split his time in 1972 between Wrigley Field in Chicago and in Triple-A Wichita, hitting just .192 in 56 big-league at-bats. 1973 was his first and only full-season in the majors, as Hiser saw action in 100 games, batting .174. Hiser was back in the minors for most of 1974 with Wichita, hitting .282 with 10 home-runs in AAA baseball, but did get a September call-up to Chicago, batting .235 in 17 games.

1975 found Hiser bouncing again between Wichita and Chicago, playing in 45 games in the majors with a .242 average. Hiser was sold to the Chicago White Sox after the season and spent 1976 with the Iowa Oaks, the White Sox AAA affiliate. The White Sox released him at the end of the 1976 season. Hiser went through spring training in 1978 with the Baltimore Orioles as a free agent but was released before the season started.

Hiser also played professional softball with the Chicago Storm of the American Professional Slo-Pitch League (APSPL) during their inaugural 1977 season. Former Cub teammate Milt Pappas served as the Storm manager.

After retiring from the field, Hiser joined the Massachusetts Mutual Life Insurance Company in Chicago as an agent, and in 1983 partnered with fellow agent James Barrett to found the Barrett and Hiser Financial Group based in Schaumburg, Illinois.
