= New England Pilgrims (softball) =

Professional softball team

The New England Pilgrims were a professional softball team in Connecticut that played in two different men's professional softball leagues between 1977 and 1981.

== History ==
New England began play in the second season of the 1978 American Professional Slo-Pitch League (APSPL) season. The team changed venues once during its existence, starting initially in 1978 at Blake Field in New Haven, where the Pilgrims remained through the 1980 (APSPL) season before moving to the Oakdale Sports Complex in Montville, Connecticut in their final season in the United Professional Softball League (UPSL). The team was owned by Carlo Grande, a sports broadcaster and owner-operator of radio stations in New England, who sold stations in New Haven and Westerly, Rhode Island to fund the purchase of the team. The APSPL was formed in 1977 by former World Football League executive Bill Byrne, who would go on to found the Women's Professional Basketball League. Former New York Yankees player Whitey Ford served as the first league commissioner.

== Pilgrims in the APSPL ==
New England hit the ground running in 1978, finishing in first-place of the Eastern Division in their first year with a record of 37-27 (.578). They advanced to the APSPL playoffs but lost to the Cincinnati Suds 2–1 in the first round. The Detroit Caesars would win their second APSPL World Series with Bert Smith of Detroit winning the series MVP. Ron Ford of the Caesars won the league MVP. Gary Bello (.548, 21 HRs, 101 RBIs) and Don Ragozzine (.585 BA, 105 runs scored) of the Pilgrims made the all-APSPL team. Frank Cammailere (.514 BA) Pat Paulsen (.395, 11 HRs, 49 RBIs) Ralph Calitri (471, 26 HRs, 105 RBIs) and Ed Finnegan (.448 BA) had solid seasons as well for New England.

1979 was a different year for the team as the Pilgrims struggled to a 21–41 (.339) finish, 14.5 games behind the division winning Rochester Zeniths, and missing out on the playoffs. No Pilgrims made the all-pro team, but Gary Bello represented New England at the mid-season all-star game. The Pilgrims signed former Detroit Tiger and Boston Red Sox player Dick McAuliffe in July to both play and serve a promotional role. The Milwaukee Schlitz would to beat the Kentucky Bourbons 5–3 in the APSPL World Series, broadcast nationwide as their first live sporting event on the new start-up sports network ESPN. Rick Weiterman of Milwaukee was both the series and league MVP in 1979.

The rival North American Softball League (NASL), formed in 1980 by Cleveland Stepien's Competitors owner Ted Stepien, split professional softball, but New England continued play in the APSPL. The Pilgrims finished with a losing record, 27–37 (.422), but advanced to the playoffs with the reduced number of teams in the league, losing to the Rochester Express 3–0 in the first round. The Express defeated the Pittsburgh Hardhats in the World Series, Don Brown of Rochester was the series MVP and Bill Gatti of Kentucky the league MVP. Pat Paulsen (.430 BA) made the all-league team and Pilgrims Gary Richter (4 HRs, 46 RBIs) and Len Larabee (.424, 7 HRs, 54 RBIs) had notably strong seasons.

== The 1981 UPSL season ==
The North American Softball League (NASL), lasted for only one season, and the APSPL then merged with the NASL to form the United Professional Softball League (UPSL) in 1981. New England began the season at Blake Field but were denied a permit by New Haven Mayor Biagio DiLieto due to complaints by local residents about noise from the Pilgrim games. The team was granted a 6-game last-minute extension and would finish the season at the Oakdale Sports Complex in Montville, over 51 miles away from New Haven.

The Pilgrims struggled to a 24–36 (.400) record, third in the Eastern Division, but advanced to a generous playoff field, upsetting Rochester in the first round 3–1. New England then beat Eastern division champions South Jersey Athletics 3-2 as Ralph Calitri went 3–4 with 2 home-runs and 4 RBIs in the 5th game. The Pilgrims then advanced to the UPSL World Series, losing 5–3 to Kentucky despite strong performances by Joe Martone (15–26, .577, 6 HRs, 18 RBIs, 11 runs scored) and Ralph Calitri (6 HRs, 15 RBIs) in the series. On the year, Martone (.472, 20 HRs, 62 RBIs) and Calitri (.505, 20 HRs, 60 RBIs) both made the all-pro team for 1981. Greg Whitlock of Kentucky was the World Series MVP and teammate Bill Gatti took league MVP honors. New England was able to play at Blake Field in New Haven for the post-season.

The Pilgrims disbanded at the end of the 1981 season, the UPSL shut down after 1982 and the era of men's professional softball came to an end as players returned to the amateur leagues.

== New England Pilgrims year-by-year record ==
| Year | Record | Pct | Finish | Division | Playoffs | League |
|---|---|---|---|---|---|---|
| 1978 | 37–27 | .578 | 1st | Eastern | 1st Round | APSPL |
| 1979 | 21–41 | .339 | 4th | Eastern | - | APSPL |
| 1980 | 27–37 | .422 | 4th | - | 1st Round | APSPL |
| 1981 | 24–36 | .400 | 3rd | Eastern | World Series (runner-up) | UPSL |
