= Bob Lurtsema =

American football player (born 1942)

No. 88, 71, 75, 70
- Positions: Defensive tackle, Defensive end

Personal information
- Born: March 29, 1942 (age 84); Grand Rapids, Michigan, U.S.
- Listed height: 6 ft 6 in (1.98 m)
- Listed weight: 250 lb (113 kg)

Career information
- High school: Ottawa Hills (Grand Rapids)
- College: Michigan Tech (1962); Western Michigan (1963-1965)
- NFL draft: 1966: undrafted

Career history
- Harrisburg Capitols (1966); Baltimore Colts (1966)*; New York Giants (1967–1971); Minnesota Vikings (1971-1976); Seattle Seahawks (1976-1977)
- * Offseason or practice squad member only

Career NFL statistics
- Fumble recoveries: 6
- Interceptions: 1
- Sacks: 38
- Stats at Pro Football Reference

Robert Ross Lurtsema (born March 29, 1942) is an American former professional football player who was a defensive end in the National Football League for the Minnesota Vikings, New York Giants and Seattle Seahawks. He played college football for the Western Michigan Broncos. Lurtsema played in two Super Bowls with the Vikings.

Born in Grand Rapids, Michigan, Lurtsema attended Ottawa Hills High School and initially went to Michigan Tech in 1962 on a basketball scholarship, but started playing football and lettered in the sport as a Huskie in the 1962 season. Lurtsema transferred to Western Michigan University to continue his collegiate career, lettering in football as a Bronco in 1965. Undrafted after graduating, Lurtsema played for the 1966 Harrisburg Capitals of the Atlantic Coast Football League, which was a taxi squad affiliated with the Baltimore Colts. Don Shula, Colts coach, had drafted Bubba Smith in 1967, blocking an opportunity for Lurtsema. Shula arranged a trade to the New York Giants. Lurtsema said of Shula, "I owe everything to Shula. He basically set up my whole career. I can’t say enough good things about him.”

Lurtsema played with the New York Giants for 1967, making the all-rookie team in 1967 and the Sporting News All-Star team in 1968. He became a regular starter for the Giants through the 1971 season, changing positions in 1970 from defensive tackle to defensive end, but the Giants waived him at the end of the 1971 season.

The Minnesota Vikings signed Lurtsema in 1972. In the third game of the Miami Dolphins 1972 NFL season, the Dolphins appeared to be on the way to losing a game against the Vikings. Lurtsema was flagged for roughing the passer in a pivotal play in the game, and for the Dolphins' season, as they ended up undefeated. Lurtsema played regularly for the Vikings and back up the famed Purple People Eaters defensive line, but he rarely started, earning the affectionate nickname "Benchwarmer Bob." Lurtsema played for the Vikings in Super Bowl VIII in 1974 and Super Bowl IX in 1975, both losing causes.

The Vikings traded Lurtsema to the Seattle Seahawks, an expansion team in their first season in 1976 in a deal for wide receiver Ahmad Rashad. Lurtsema played two seasons in Seattle, starting regularly at defensive end. He retired after the 1977 NFL season with 82 career starts.

After retirement, Lurtsema often appeared as "Benchwarmer Bob" in television commercials for TCF Financial Corporation.

Lurtsema pitched for the Minnesota Norsemen professional softball team during their 1979 season in the American Professional Slo-Pitch League (APSPL). He also owned Benchwarmer Bob's Sports Cafe, which had two locations in the Twin Cities.

In 1990, Lurtsema wrestled a match for American Wrestling Association's AWA Twin Wars teaming with Brad Rheingans and The Trooper defeating Tully Blanchard and the Destruction Crew.

In 2013, Lurtsema signed on to support the lawsuit brought against the NFL in regard to concussions in the sport. He advocated for the funds to be used for players impacted by injuries and for research into brain injuries. Lurtsema and his wife Aloise are retired and live in Minnesota.
