= Danny Napoleon =

American baseball player (1942-2003)

- Left fielder
- Born: January 11, 1942; Claysburg, Pennsylvania, U.S.
- Died: April 26, 2003 (aged 61); Trenton, New Jersey, U.S.
- Batted: Right Threw: Right

MLB debut
- April 14, 1965, for the New York Mets

Last MLB appearance
- October 2, 1966, for the New York Mets

MLB statistics
- Batting average: .162
- Home runs: 0
- Runs batted in: 7
- Stats at Baseball Reference

Teams
- New York Mets (1965–1966)

Daniel Napoleon (January 11, 1942 – April 26, 2003) was an American Major League Baseball left fielder from 1965 to 1966 with the New York Mets. Napoleon batted and threw right-handed.

== Early years ==
Napoleon played baseball, football, basketball and track at Morrisville High School in Morrisville, PA. Shortly after graduation, his father died. While playing at Rider University, he caught the eye of the Mets, and signed as an amateur free agent with them prior to the 1964 season.

He batted .351 with 36 home runs and 134 runs batted in his first year of professional baseball to carry the Auburn Mets to a 79–48 record and first place in the New York–Penn League. In order to protect him from being selected in the minor league draft, the Mets added him to their 40-man roster.

== Baseball career ==
Napoleon made his major league debut on April 14, 1965 in the eleventh inning of an extra innings affair with the Houston Astros. He singled off Hal Woodeshick in his first major league at bat. Ten days later, Napoleon hit a pinch hit bases loaded triple off the San Francisco Giants' Bob Shaw for his first three major league RBIs.

Despite being predominantly an outfielder, Napoleon made his first six appearances on the field at third base. He saw most of his action as a pinch hitter or pinch runner, and was batting .176 with six RBIs when he was demoted to triple A in early August to receive more playing time. In 30 games with the Buffalo Bisons, Napoleon batted .274 with one home run and nine RBIs. He rejoined the Mets in September, and went 1-for-23.

He spent the 1966 season with the Jacksonville Suns. He was second on the team with 15 home runs and third with 53 RBIs. He was called up to the Mets again that September, and batted .212 in 12 games.

He was traded along with Ed Bressoud and cash from the Mets to the St. Louis Cardinals for Jerry Buchek, Art Mahaffey and Tony Martínez on April 1, 1967. Napoleon spent the 1967 with the Tulsa Oilers, the St. Louis Triple-A affiliate.

He batted .314 in 1969 for the Texas League's Arkansas Travelers, the Double-A farm team for the Cardinals. He played and coached with Arkansas through 1971, but he never returned to the majors.

== Life after baseball ==
In 1977, Napoleon played professional softball with the New Jersey Statesmen of the American Professional Slo-Pitch League (APSPL), playing alongside fellow Major League Baseball alumnus Curt Blefary.

Napoleon also worked for the New Jersey State Department of Treasury and was an original employee at the Candlelight Lounge in Trenton. He was employed by General Motors at the time of his death. Napoleon died on April 26, 2003, survived by his wife and three children.
