= Men's professional softball in the United States =

APSPL, NASL and UPSL

During the late 1970s and early 1980s, several men's professional slow-pitch softball leagues were formed in the United States to build on the growth and talent in the booming men's amateur game during this period. The American Professional Slo-Pitch League (APSPL) was the first such league, launching in an era of experimentation in professional sports leagues. The APSPL was formed in 1977 by former World Football League executive Bill Byrne, who would go on to found the Women's Professional Basketball League. Former New York Yankees star Whitey Ford was the first APSPL commissioner.

In 1980, three teams, the Milwaukee Schlitz, the Fort Wayne Huggie Bears and Cleveland Stepien's Competitors, broke away to form the North American Softball League (NASL), under the leadership of Cleveland owner Ted Stepien, who owned six of the eight teams in the league (only Fort Wayne and Milwaukee had non-Stepien ownership in the new league); the APSPL continued with just six teams. Former Major League Baseball players Mudcat Grant and Joe Pepitone served as PR officials for the new league; Pepitone would also play for Chicago Nationwide Advertising, having played previously for the Trenton Statesmen franchise in the APSPL. The owners of the APSPL Pittsburgh Hardhats unsuccessfully challenged Stepien in court in an attempt to prevent the new league from splitting the young professional sport. The NASL only lasted the one season. Also in 1980, Stepien made the news when he held a promotional event for the league in Cleveland in which he dropped softballs from the 52nd floor of Terminal Tower to be caught by outfielders from his Cleveland Competitors team. The balls were estimated to be traveling at 144 mph by the time they reached the street, damaging cars and injuring several spectators. One was caught by Cleveland outfielder Mike Zarefoss.

In 1981 the APSPL merged with NASL to create the United Professional Softball League (UPSL), but only the Milwaukee franchise came from the NASL to the new league as the other NASL teams folded. The merged league competed for two seasons, before disbanding after the 1982 season, ending the pro era of men's softball.

Of note historically, the first sporting event to air on ESPN on September 7, 1979 was an APSPL championship game between the Milwaukee Schlitz and Kentucky Bourbons.

A number of prominent athletes from other sports came to the professional softball leagues. Major League Baseball baseball veterans Jim Rivera, Curt Blefary, Johnny Callison and Milt Pappas managed teams. Softball players included former National Football League stars Billy "White Shoes" Johnson and Bob Lurtsema, Rick Wilson from the NBA, and retired MLB players Ralph Garr, Norm Cash, Bruce Miller, Jim Price, Darrel Chaney, Jim Northrup, Gene Hiser, Mickey Stanley, Danny Napoleon, Dick McAuliffe, and Zoilo Versalles. Few had much success in professional softball, playing part-time and promotional roles. The notable exception was former New York Yankee and Chicago Cub Joe Pepitone who played for the Trenton Statesmen. Pepitone put up respectable numbers in 1978 (110–225, .489, 14 HRs, 61 RBIs) and 1979 (50-122, .410, 9 HRs, 30 RBIs). The Detroit Caesars would even offer $30,000 to the Statesmen to buy Pepitone's contract in 1978. That offer was rejected. After the New Jersey franchise disbanded in 1979, Pepitone went on to serve as the team president and played first base for Chicago Nationwide Advertising in the North American Softball League (NASL) in their 1980 season.

The professional softball era showcased some of the all-time best in softball history with several pro era veterans represented in the American Softball Association Hall of Fame - Tex Collins (Detroit), Ron Ford (Detroit), Jim Galloway (New York, Trenton), Bill Gatti (Kentucky), Mike Gouin (Detroit), Dennis Graser (Milwaukee), Mike Nye (Detroit), Steve Loya (Cleveland), Mike Mancenko (Cleveland), Willie Simpson (Chicago), Bert Smith (Detroit), and manager Eddie Zolna (Chicago). In addition, pro softball alumni Rick Weiterman (Milwaukee), Cal Carmen (Rochester, Detroit), Gary Vitto (Detroit), Chuck Drewicz (Detroit), Bill Gatti (Kentucky), Mike Mancenko (Cleveland), and Braxton Speller, Jr. (Detroit) are members of United States Slowpitch Softball Association (USSSA) Hall of Fame.

== Year-by-year awards and leaders ==
American Professional Slo-Pitch League (APSPL)
Year	Winner	Runner-up	Score	World Series MVP	League MVP	Batting Average	Home Runs	RBIs
1977	Detroit Caesars	Baltimore Monuments	4–0	Mike Nye (Detroit)	Benny Holt (Chicago)	Benny Holt (Chicago), .690	Benny Holt (Chicago), 89	Benny Holt (Chicago), 187
1978	Detroit Caesars	Minnesota Norsemen	4–0	Bert Smith (Detroit)	Ron Ford (Detroit)	Mike Nye (Detroit), 654	Ron Ford (Detroit), 80	Ron Ford (Detroit), 201
1979	Milwaukee Schlitz	Kentucky Bourbons	5–4	Rick Weiterman (Milwaukee)	Rick Weiterman (Milwaukee)	Rick Weiterman (Milwaukee), 557	Ron Ford (Detroit), 43	Ron Ford (Detroit), 122
1980	Rochester Express	Pittsburgh Hardhats	5–4	Don Brown (Rochester)	Bill Gatti (Kentucky)	Rich Brown (Rochester), .494	Bill Gatti (Kentucky), Bob Schuster, (Rochester), 21	Bill Gatti (Kentucky), 87

North American Softball League (NASL)
Year	Winner	Runner-up	Score	World Series MVP	League MVP	Batting Average	Home Runs	RBIs
1980	Milwaukee Schlitz	Detroit Auto Kings	5–2	Ken Parker (Milwaukee)	Ron Olesiak (Chicago)	Ron Olesiak (Chicago), .556	Benny Holt (Cleveland), 42	Ron Olesiak (Chicago), 124

United Professional Softball League (UPSL)
Year	Winner	Runner-up	Score	World Series MVP	League MVP	Batting Average	Home Runs	RBIs
1981	Kentucky Bourbons	New England Pilgrims	5–3	Greg Whitlock (Kentucky)	Bill Gatti (Kentucky)	Bill Gatti (Kentucky), .622	Bill Gatti (Kentucky), 38	Bill Gatti (Kentucky), 99
1982	Milwaukee Schlitz	Detroit Softball City	5–1	Dick Laba (Milwaukee)	Dana Andry (Cleveland)	Dana Andry (Cleveland), .618	Dana Andry (Cleveland), 65	Mike Manceko (Cleveland), 140

== Professional Softball All-Time Team ==
Team chosen by Robert Brown, former NASL league commissioner

Position	First-Team Selection	Team(s)	Runner-up	Team(s)
Pitcher	Rick Weiterman	Milwaukee Copper Hearth, Milwaukee Schlitz	Dana Andry	Cleveland Competitors
Catcher	Bill Gatti	Kentucky Bourbons	Benny Holt	Chicago Storm, Cleveland Competitors
First Baseman	Doug Gerdes	Detroit Caesars, Detroit Softball City	Dennis Graser	Milwaukee Copper Hearth, Milwaukee Schlitz
Second Baseman	Donnie Rardin	Kentucky Bourbons, Cincinnati Suds, Lexington Stallions	Doug Czaplewski	Milwaukee Copper Hearth, Milwaukee Schlitz
Shortstop	Rick Trudeau	Detroit Caesars, Detroit Softball City	Denny Brown	Pittsburgh Hardhats
Third Baseman	Buddy Haines	Chicago Storm, Milwaukee Schlitz, Chicago Nationwide Advertising	Gary Richter	New York Clippers, Trenton Statesmen
Outfielder	Ron Ford	Detroit Caesars	Gene Parrish	Minnesota Goofy's, Minnesota Norsemen
Outfielder	Mike Nye	Detroit Caesars	Ken Parker	Milwaukee Copper Hearth, Milwaukee Schlitz, Kentucky Bourbons
Outfielder	Phil Higgins	Milwaukee Copper Hearth, Milwaukee Schlitz	Fred Miller	Kentucky Bourbons, Cleveland Competitors
Outfielder	Mike Gouin	Detroit Caesars, Detroit Auto Kings	Ron Olesiak	Chicago Storm, Chicago Nationwide Advertising
Utility	Rick Petrunyak	Cleveland Jaybirds, Cleveland Competitors	Lawrence Hutcherson	Baltimore Monuments, Philadelphia Athletics
Utility	Jim Dillard	Milwaukee Copper Hearth, Milwaukee Schlitz	John Spadaccino	New Jersey Statesmen, Philadelphia Athletics
Utility	Bert Smith	Detroit Caesars		
Manager	Gary Vitto	Detroit Caesars, Detroit Softball City	Mike Basile	Milwaukee Schlitz

== Men's professional softball teams ==
- Baltimore Monuments (1977)
- Chicago Nationwide Advertising (1980)
- Chicago Storm (1977–1978)
- Cincinnati Rivermen (1980)
- Cincinnati Suds (1977–1982)
- Cleveland Jaybirds (1977–1978), Cleveland Stepien's Competitors (1979–1980), Cleveland Competitors (1982)
- Columbus All-Americans (1977)
- Detroit Auto Kings (1980)
- Detroit Caesars (1977–1979)
- Detroit Softball City (1982)
- Fort Wayne Huggie Bears (1980)
- Fort Wayne Scouts (1979)
- Kentucky Bourbons (1977–1982)
- Lexington Stallions (1980)
- Lima Steele's (1982)
- Milwaukee Copper Hearth (1977), Milwaukee Schlitz (1978–1982)
- Minnesota Goofy's (1977), Minnesota Norsemen (1978–1979)
- New England Pilgrims (1978–1981)
- New Jersey Statesmen (1977), Trenton Statesmen (1978), Trenton Champales (1979)
- New York Clippers (1977)
- Philadelphia Athletics (1978–1980), South Jersey Athletics (1981–1982)
- Pittsburgh Champions (1980)
- Pittsburgh Hardhats (1977–1982)
- Rochester Zeniths (1978–1979), Rochester Express (1980–1982)
- Syracuse Salts (1981)

(Note that teams are listed horizontally if the same franchise changed names)

== See also ==
- National Pro Fastpitch, a defunct women's professional softball league, dissolved in 2021
