= Baltimore Monuments =

Professional softball team

The Baltimore Monuments were a professional softball team that played in the American Professional Slo-Pitch League (APSPL) during the 1977 season. They played their home games at Rips Memorial Stadium in Bowie, Maryland.

== APSPL history ==
During the late 1970s and early 1980s, several men's professional slow-pitch softball leagues were formed in the United States to build on the growth and talent in the booming men's amateur game during this period. The American Professional Slo-Pitch League (APSPL) was the first such league, launching in an era of experimentation in professional sports leagues. The APSPL was formed in 1977 by former World Football League executive Bill Byrne who would go on to form the Women's Professional Basketball League. Former New York Yankees star Whitey Ford was the first league commissioner.

== Monuments team history ==
The Monuments finished the 1977 season in first place of the Eastern Division with a record of 33-20 (.623). They defeated the New York Clippers in the first round of the playoffs 2-0 (15-14, 10-9), advancing to the next round where they defeated the Kentucky Bourbons 2-1 (6-17, 10-4, 15-10). The Monuments then lost 4-0 (18-16, 13-8, 25-16, 28-11) in the first APSPL World Series to the Detroit Caesars with Mike Nye of Detroit winning the series MVP award. Benny Holt (.690, 89 HRs, 187 RBIs) of the Chicago Storm won the triple crown and was named league MVP. Baltimore players John Copenhaver (.599, 36 HRs, 95 RBIs), John Dollar (.522, 62 runs scored), Jay Smith (.562, 81 runs scored) and Lawrence "Boom Boom" Hutcherson (.596, 45 HRs, 129 RBIs) made the 1977 APSPL All-Pro team. Nick Sessoms went 18-9 pitching for Baltimore.

Goals to return for 1978 hit a stumbling block when team owner Jim Ports fired Monuments manager Ray Duncan just as the 1978 season was set to begin when Duncan refused to turn over new player contracts to ownership until players were paid. When Ports was then unable to secure Rips Field as a playing site for 1978, the APSPL moved on with their season without the Monuments on the schedule and the team disbanded. Dollar and Hutcherson would go on to play with the Philadelphia Athletics of the APSPL for 1978.

== Baltimore Monuments record ==
Year	Record	Pct	Finish	Division	Playoffs	League
1977	33-20	.623	1st	Eastern	World Series (runner-up)	APSPL
