= Detroit Softball City =

Professional softball team

Detroit Softball City was a professional softball team that played during the 1982 season in the United Professional Softball League (UPSPL). Detroit Softball City played at and was named for a large recreational softball complex on the grounds of the Michigan State Fair in Detroit.

== Softball City history ==
Softball City opened in 1976, leasing land from the Michigan Department of Natural Resources at the Michigan State Fairgrounds. Softball City was the first privately operated softball complex in the US. Their lease on land at the fairgrounds was not renewed in 1996 when Governor John Engler elected to pursue a plan for a return of auto racing on the land. The fairgrounds had previously been the home for the Michigan State Fairgrounds Speedway. Those plans never came to fruition. In 2009, Governor Jennifer Granholm vetoed legislation to provide funding to the Michigan State Fair, bringing the 160 year history of the fair to an end.

== Detroit Softball City team history ==
In 1977, Mike Ilitch formed the Detroit Caesars in the first professional league, the American Professional Softball League (APSPL) who played at Memorial Field in East Detroit. That team won two World Series before disbanding at the end of the 1979 season.

Ted Stepien, owner of the Cleveland APSPL franchise, created a rival league in 1980, the North American Softball League (NASL), and founded the Detroit Auto Kings. The Auto Kings, who also played at Memorial Field in East Detroit advanced to the NASL World Series but lost 5-2 to the Milwaukee Schlitz. The team and the league disbanded at the end of the season. Many of the elite Detroit area softball players went to the Snyder's-Stroh's team the National Slo-Pitch Conference (NSPC), an amateur softball competition that was drawing significant team sponsorship and talent from the professional game. Stepien fielded the Nationwide Advertising team in the 1981 competition, keeping much of the team together from the 1980 NASL Cleveland Stepien's Competitors team together. Detroit-based Snyder's-Stroh's featured former Detroit Caesars Rick Trudeau, Gary Geister, Chuck Drewicz and local stand-out Braxton Speller, and finished 3rd behind Cleveland and NSPC champion Howard's Western Steer out of North Carolina in the 1981 NSPC.

The APSPL and the NASL had merged to form the United Professional Softball League in 1981, although only Milwaukee came to the new league from the NASL. No Detroit team played in 1981 in the UPSL. In 1982, former Detroit Caesars executive, former NASL Commissioner and 1981 NSPC Commissioner Robert Brown put together a Stepien funded team yet again in the Motor City, Detroit Softball City, who played in the UPSL in 1982. The team was led by Charlie Mitchell and Braxton Speller, along with former Caesars Rick Trudeau, Doug Gerdes, Chuck Drewicz, George Birch, Gary Geister and manager Gary Vitto, along with former Auto Kings Matt Partridge and Mike Turk. Detroit Softball City finished second in the division to the Cleveland Competitors with a record of 36–20 (.661), advancing to the playoffs against the South Jersey Athletics, winning the series 3-0 (18-11, 16-15, 18-14) in the first round, and then defeating Cleveland 3–2 in the semi-finals 3-2 (14–7, 6–11, 9–7, 0–11, 17–10). Detroit would lose in the UPSL World Series to Milwaukee 5–1 (9–8, 8–3, 7–10, 13–11, 12–7, 39–6) with the Schlitz led by World Series MVP Dick Laba (.667 BA).

Dana Andry of Cleveland was the UPSL MVP (.618, 65 HRs, 128 RBIs, 125 Runs, 46-17 pitching) and Charles Mitchell (59 HRs, 133 RBIs) of Detroit made the All-UPSL team. Gary Gesiter (39 HRs, 86 RBIs) and Braxton Speller (29 HRs, 74 RBIS) contributed to the cause. Detroit Softball City and the USPL disbanded at the end of the season marking the end for men's professional softball in the US as players once again returned to amateur leagues.

Softball City alumnus Braxton Speller, Jr. is a member of United States Slowpitch Softball Association (USSSA) Hall of Fame.

== Detroit Softball City record ==
Year	Record	Pct	Finish	Division	Playoffs	League
1982	39-20	.661	2nd	Eastern	World Series (runner-up)	UPSL
