= Fort Wayne Scouts =

Professional softball team

The Fort Wayne Scouts were a professional softball team that played in the American Professional Slo-Pitch League (APSPL) in the 1979 season at the Tah-Cum-Wah Recreation Center in Fort Wayne, Indiana.

== League history ==
During the late 1970s and early 1980s, several men's professional slow-pitch softball leagues were formed in the United States to build on the growth and talent in the booming men's amateur game during this period. The American Professional Slo-Pitch League (APSPL) was the first such league, launching in an era of experimentation in professional sports leagues. The APSPL was formed in 1977 by former World Football League front-office executive Bill Byrne, who would go on to found the Women's Professional Basketball League. Former New York Yankees star Whitey Ford was the first APSPL commissioner. The Scouts were named for the International Scout SUV, which was manufactured in Fort Wayne by their sponsor International Harvester. The team was partially owned and managed by former Major League Baseball player Jim Rivera.

== Fort Wayne Scouts ==
Fort Wayne would put forward one of the worst records in the 6-year run of professional softball, finishing the 1979 season with a 8-56 (.172) record, 32.5 games behind the Milwaukee Schlitz. Milwaukee would take the APSPL title in 1979 over the Kentucky Bourbons, with Schlitz player Rick Weiterman winning both the series and league MVP awards. This series was the first sporting event to air on the new sports network ESPN. No Scouts made the all-APSPL squad although Tommy Spahn, who had previously played for the Chicago Storm, and Cardell Collins, made the mid-season all-star game, played in Louisville, Kentucky. Former Chicago player Mike Krolicki also suited up for Fort Wayne and Lou Banks (16 HRs) of the Scouts contributed on the year. Dave Evilsizer and Dave France helped to lead the over-matched Scouts, trading off catching and pitching duties.

== Fort Wayne Huggie Bears ==
The North American Softball League (NASL) split from the APSPL after the 1979 season, as three teams came to the NASL from the APSPL – Fort Wayne, the Cleveland Stepien's Competitors, owned by Ted Stepien, who served as NASL President, along with the APSPL champion Milwaukee Schlitz. Six of the eight NASL teams (all except Fort Wayne and Milwaukee) were owned by Stepien. Former MLB player Mudcat Grant served as a PR official for the league. The NASL would last just one season. The Fort Wayne Huggie Bears were formed by Rivera and also played at the Tah-Cum-Wah Complex in Fort Wayne. The team was named after a lollipop manufactured by a local candy company.

The Huggie Bears fared only slightly better than the Scouts, finishing the year 11-49 (.183), 36 games behind Milwaukee in the NASL Eastern Division. No Huggie Bears made the all-pro team but Lou Banks and Cardell Collins represented Fort Wayne at the mid-season All-Star game played in Willoughby, Ohio. The team did feature former San Francisco Giant Bruce Miller, a Fort Wayne native. Dave France pitched again for Fort Wayne in 1980, Cardell Collins and Lou Banks provided power, and Eddie Echols and Clint Werley added depth for the Huggie Bears. The NASL disbanded at the end of the season, bringing the disastrous run of professional softball in Fort Wayne to a close.

== Fort Wayne year-by-year record ==
Year	Team name	Record	Pct	Finish	Division	Playoffs	League
1979	Scouts	8-56	.172	4th	Midwestern	-	APSPL
1980	Huggie Bears	11-49	.183	4th	Western	-	NASL
