= Detroit Caesars =

Professional softball team

The Detroit Caesars were a professional softball team played in the American Professional Slo-Pitch League (APSPL) from 1977 to 1979.

== History ==
Prior to formalized professional play, Detroit was a hotbed for softball, with some of the top players in the country playing in competitive local leagues and for national softball championships. A major sponsor of softball in the Detroit area was Little Caesar's Pizza, whose team had won the 1970 Amateur Softball Association national title with future Caesars Mike Gouin, Tex Collins, and Tony Mazza. Little Caesar's was founded and owned by Mike Ilitch, a former Detroit Tigers farmhand and later the owner of the MLB team, one of several professional sports teams he was eventually to own. The Caesars were his first independent step into professional sports ownership. Ilitch has previously been part-owner of the Detroit Wheels, a football team that played in the World Football League for the 1974 season, and a member of a 33-person ownership group that included Motown singer Marvin Gaye.

The APSPL was formed by former World Football League executive Bill Byrne, who would go on to form the Women's Professional Basketball League. Former New York Yankees player Whitey Ford was brought on to serve as league commissioner. The Caesars would play at Memorial Field in East Detroit, a small suburb of Detroit, and with promotions tied in with the pizza chain, Ilitch signed former Detroit Tiger stars, Jim Northrup, Mickey Stanley, Jim Price and Norm Cash to play part-time and promotional roles to boost attendance. Amateur all-world softball players Mike Nye, Ron Ford, Bert Smith, Mike Gouin and Tex Collins were signed to play for the Caesars. Showing his financial commitment to winning, Ilitch even signed Ford and Nye to personal service contracts with Little Caesar's, employing them through the company, and did the same for Cash and Northrup. In 1977, Ford and Nye would make $25,000 a year with the Caesars as a result; Northtrup and Cash $30,000. The Major League Baseball minimum salary in 1977 was $19,000.

The team was led by manager Gary Vitto, and the Caesars would win two World Series titles before disbanding after the 1979 season. Vitto would go on to serve as General Manager of the Detroit Drive of the Arena Football League and then served in the front office of the Detroit Tigers until his death in 2001.

Five members of the Detroit Caesars are in the American Softball Association Hall of Fame - Mike Gouin, Carl "Tex" Collins, Mike Nye, Ron Ford and Bert Smith. In addition, former Caesars Cal Carmen, Gary Vitto and Chuck Drewicz are members of the United States Slowpitch Softball Association (USSSA) Hall of Fame.

== 1977 APSPL champions ==
In 1977, Detroit dominated the league with a league-best record of 42–14, two games ahead of the Kentucky Bourbons' 40–16 mark. The opening series against the Chicago Storm got attention in the league as the Caesars hit 49 home-runs in winning 3 of a 4-game series in Chicago (28-21, 25–27, 31–18, 46-24). Chicago owner Lou Knudston said of the Caesars, "they've got a bunch of guys who stand 6'4" and weigh about 280, and they walk up there and whack it out of sight." He proposed modifying stadiums and deadening balls after that first weekend. In the post-season, Detroit and Kentucky received first-round playoff byes and the Caesars beat the Cleveland Jaybirds 2–1 (4–7, 22–5, 8–6) in a tight series as Jaybird pitcher took advantage of the larger Trechter Stadium in Cincinnati to negate the power-game of Detroit in the opener. Gary Geister hit a pair of 3-run homers to lead a blowout in the second game, and then delivered a 2-run home-run in the 4th inning of the 3rd and deciding game to take the series.

Detroit advanced to the first professional softball World Series against the Baltimore Monuments and hosted the series with the league-best record. The Caesars would dominate the series and win 4–0 (18–16, 13–8, 25–16, 28–11) with Mike Nye (.600, 2 HRs) taking the MVP trophy.

Six Caesars made the all-league team - Mike Gouin (.561 BA, 35 HRs, 124 RBIs), Ron Ford (.607, 85 HRs, 184 RBIs, 150 runs scored), Mike Nye (.659, 36 HRs, 104 RBIs), Bert Smith (.512, 53 HRs, 122 RBIs), Tony Mazza (23-6 pitching record) and Doug Gerdes (.599, 60 HRs, 124 RBIs). Caesars Jim Mitchell (.603, 37 HRs, 77 RBIs), Al Gibson (.527, 26 HRs, 60 RBIs) and Tex Collins (.569, 61 HRs, 119 RBIs) had excellent seasons in support. Only a triple-crown performance by league MVP Chicago Storm catcher Benny Holt (.690, 89 HRs, 187 RBIs) could overshadow the individual performances by various Caesars.

== 1978 APSPL champions ==
Ilitch made the team even better for 1978, adding Rick Trudeau, Larry Elkins and Chuck Drewicz from Snyder's, a Detroit amateur softball power who had won the 1975 and 1976 USSSA national title (runner-up in 1977). Cleveland manager Tom Bruening said before their season opener, "we'll be overpowered by Detroit. There is no way you can stop them." The Caesars rolled again in 1978 with another league best record, 49–15 (.766), 9 games ahead of the Minnesota Norsemen in the Midwestern Division, and received a first-round bye in the playoffs. In the APSPL semifinals the Caesars again faced Cleveland, winning 2–0 (27–22, 30–24), and advancing to face Minnesota, with the second-best league record, in the World Series. The Caesars would repeat as professional softball champions with a dominating 4–0 victory (22–16, 50–12, 24–16, 26–12) as Detroit's Bert Smith hit 15–16 (.940) with 5 home-runs and 16 RBIs to earn the series MVP. Smith's only out was a base hit that was disallowed when Bert was called for stepping on the plate.

Seven Detroit players were all-league - Ron Ford (.645, 80 HRs, 201 RBIs), Mike Nye (.654, 33 HRs, 110 RBIs), Doug Gerdes (53 HRs, 112 RBIs), Gary Geister (45 HRs, 106 RBIs), Mike Gouin (.601 BA), Jack Roudebush (.579 BA) and newcomer Chuck Drewicz (25-5 pitching record). Larry Elkins (.488, 27 HRs, 76 RBIs) and Bert Smith (.529, 42 HRs, 104 RBIs) had productive campaigns as well. The mid-season 1978 APSPL All-Star game actually featured the Caesars playing a team of all-stars chosen from all the other teams. The Caesars took the double-header (14-9, 8-3).

Ron Ford of Detroit was edged out in the last game of the season by teammate Mike Nye in batting percentage (.654 to .645) to prevent his taking of triple-crown honors, but still took home league MVP. Manager Gary Vitto offered to sit the two Caesars stars in the last game of the season as they were essentially tied for the battle title, but they elected to play and compete on the field. Ford went 2-5 and Nye 6–6 with two grand slams to take the batting crown. Detroit owner Ilitch made news in 1978 when he offered $30,000 for the contract of former MLB player Joe Pepitone of the Trenton Statesmen. The offer was rejected.

After having no broadcast coverage in 1977, the Caesars had their home games carried by WBRB radio (AM 1430 and FM 102.7) in 1978.

== 1979 APSPL season ==
Early season injuries to Ron Ford, Mike Nye and Bert Smith had the Caesars off to a less than dominant start in 1979. Rick Trudeau, Charles Mitchell and Mike Gouin were hurt as well, missing 26 games among them. The Caesars also switched radio stations, as WMZK (FM 97.9) carried the club's home games in 1979.

A summer hot streak aside, the Caesars backed up and the rival Milwaukee Schlitz, led by APSPL star Phil Higgins and league and eventual APSPL World Series MVP Rick Weiterman, were ready. Detroit would finish second in the Midwestern Division behind Milwaukee and advanced to play the Cincinnati Suds in the first round of the playoffs winning 3–2 (18–8, 7–8, 11–14, 3–1, 7–6) when the Suds 5-run 7th inning rally came up one run short of tying the game. Detroit advanced to the semifinals, losing to the surging Schlitz 3–0 (11–5, 7–4, 5–1). Milwaukee went on to beat the Kentucky Bourbons 5–3 in the APSPL World Series, broadcast nationwide on the new start-up sports network ESPN. Detroit Caesar and former Detroit Tiger Jim Price was part of the broadcast team for the series.

ESPN Broadcast, 1979 APSPL World Series, Game 8, Milwaukee at Kentucky

The APSPL had also instituted several rule changes in 1979, including moving the base paths to 70 feet from 65, moving the pitcher's mound to 49-feet and several of the fields lengthened their dimensions to 315–330 feet from 300-feet in an effort to promote a less power-oriented game. The league also had Detroit and Cleveland use a different ball in home games. Offensive production dropped as a result league wide. On Detroit, Ron Ford's home run total dropped from 80 in 1978 to 43 and RBIs fell from 201 to 122 in the same number of league games and Ford still led the league in both categories, even with missing 21 games due to injury. Ford batted .617, but was not officially recognized as the batting champion due to not having enough at bats for eligibility, missing out on the triple crown as a result.

Four Caesars took all-league honors - Ron Ford (.617, 43 HRs, 122 RBIs), Mike Nye (.503, 78 runs scored), Doug Gerdes (.500, 31 HRs, 97 RBIs) and Rick Trudeau (.549 BA). Cal Carmen (.511, 4 HRs, 32 RBIs) and Gary Geister (.464, 28 HRs, 78 RBIs) had good seasons as well.

Despite strong attendance and fan interest, Ilitch was losing money on the team. Cleveland owner Ted Stepien intended to split the young professional sport, forming a new league, which Pittsburgh Hardhats ownership challenged in court. Stepien even offered to buy the Caesars from Ilitch for $100,000, but Ilitch would not sell the team with the Caesars name. Weary of the in-fighting, Ilitch disbanded the Caesars after three seasons.

== Detroit Caesars year-by-year record ==
Year	Record	Pct	Finish	Division	Playoffs	League
1977	42-14	.750	1st	Midwest	Champions	APSPL
1978	49-15	.766	1st	Midwest	Champions	APSPL
1979	40-24	.625	2nd	Midwest	Semi-Finals	APSPL

== Detroit Auto Kings and Softball City ==
Instability in other markets and internal political fighting saw three teams (Fort Wayne, Cleveland and Milwaukee) leave the APSPL to form the North American Softball League (NASL) under the leadership of Cleveland owner Ted Stepien. The APSPL continued with just 6 teams (down from 12 in each of the previous 3 seasons). The Detroit Auto Kings, owned by Stepien, were formed as part of the new league and also played at Memorial Field. Several Caesars, including Mike Gouin, Dan Murphy, Tony Mazza and Gary Geister, played for the Auto Kings along with former Detroit Tiger Mickey Stanley. The Auto Kings advanced to the playoffs with a 34–23 record winning the semifinals 4–1 over Cleveland Stepien's Competitors. Detroit would advance to the NASL World Series and lose to the Milwaukee Schlitz 5–2. Ken Parker of Milwaukee would take the World Series MVP trophy while Ron Olesiak of Chicago was the league MVP. Mike Turk of the Auto Kings was the sole Detroit representative on the 1980 NASL All-Pro team.

The NASL and the APSPL merged after the 1980 season to form a new league, the United Professional Softball League (UPSL), and the Auto Kings disbanded. There was no Detroit team in the 1981 UPSL season. In 1982, Detroit Softball City, playing at and named for a large softball complex on the grounds of the Michigan State Fair, played in the UPSL and were led by Charles Mitchell, along with former Caesars Rick Trudeau, Chuck Drewicz, Doug Gerdes, Gary Geister and manager Gary Vitto. Detroit Softball City finished second in the division to Cleveland Competitors with a record of 36–20, advancing to the playoffs against the South Jersey Athletics, winning 3–0 in the first round, and then defeating Cleveland 3–2 in the semi-finals 3–2. Detroit would lose in the UPSL World Series to Milwaukee 5–1 with the Schlitz led by World Series MVP Dick Laba. Dana Andry of Cleveland was the UPSL MVP and Charles Mitchell of Detroit made the All-UPSL team. That was the last year for professional softball in the US as players once again returned to amateur leagues.

== Auto Kings and Softball City record ==
Team	Year	Record	Pct	Finish	Division	Playoffs	League
Auto Kings	1980	35-26	.574	1st	Eastern	World Series (runner-up)	NASL
Softball City	1982	39-20	.661	2nd	Eastern	World Series (runner-up)	UPSL
