= Kentucky Bourbons =

Former professional softball team

The Kentucky Bourbons were a professional softball team that played in two men's professional softball leagues between 1977 and 1982 at Bishop David Stadium in Louisville, Kentucky. The Bourbons, Cincinnati Suds and Pittsburgh Hardhats were the only three teams to play all 6 seasons of professional softball.

== Bourbons in the APSPL ==
The American Professional Slo-Pitch League (APSPL) was formed by former World Football League executive Bill Byrne, who would go on to form the Women's Professional Basketball League. Former New York Yankees player Whitey Ford was brought on to serve as league commissioner. The Bourbons were owned by Don Rardin Sr., who started the team in 1977, but then sold the club the following year to Larry Gatti, who owned several McDonald's franchises in the Louisville, Kentucky area. Both men had sons who would be all-pro players for the Bourbons.

In the 1977 APSPL season the Bourbons won the Central Division finishing eight games ahead of the Cleveland Jaybirds. The Bourbons' 40–16 (.714) record was the 2nd best in the APSPL behind only the 42–14 (.750) tally of the Midwest Division champion and eventual World Series champions Detroit Caesars. Kentucky lost in the playoff semifinals 2–1 to the East Division champion Baltimore Monuments, led by semi-finals playoff MVP Johnny Dollar. Phil Schroer (15–5 pitching), Bill Gatti (.539, 48 HRs, 127 RBIs) and Don Rardin (.536, 4 HRs, 51 RBIs, 81 runs scored) of the Bourbons made the all-league team. Cobbie Harrison (.437, 17 HRs, 60 RBIs) and Nick Nikitas (.480, 78 runs scored) had solid seasons in support.

In 1978 the Bourbons finished with 30 wins and 34 losses (.469), ten games behind the Central Division champion Cincinnati Suds and failed to make the playoffs. Bill Gatti (.584, 54 HRs, 132 RBIs, 131 runs scored) and Fred Miller (.549, 57 HRs, 141 RBIs) represented the Bourbons on the 1978 All-APSPL team. Fred Miller (.549, 57 HRs, 141 RBIs) and Phil Schrorer (.507, 3 HRs, 58 RBIs, 27–26 pitching) added to the 1978 cause.

The 1979 squad finished with a league best regular season record of 48–15 (.762) and defeated the Trenton Champales 3–0 in the first-round and the Rochester Zeniths 3–1 in the semi-finals. to advance to the APSPL World Series. Games were featured on the new start-up sports network ESPN with the Bourbons losing the series 5–2 to the Milwaukee Schlitz with league and World Series MVP Rick Weiterman.

Phil Schroer (40–8 pitching, 3.84 ERA), Don Rardin (.486, 22 HRs, 87 RBIs), returned from a year with the Cincinnati Suds, and Bill Gatti (.533, 20 HRs, 79 RBIs) made the all-APSPL team in 1979. Rardin, Gatti, Cobbie Harrison, Chuck Winders, and Phil Schroer of Kentucky all represented Kentucky in the mid-season all-star game. Winders (.409, 6 HRs, 60 RBIs) and Nick Nikitas .493, 95 runs scored) had productive campaigns in 1979.

1980 was a year of division in professional softball as the Cleveland Stepien's Competitors, Fort Wayne Huggie Bears and Milwaukee broke away from the APSPL to form a new league (North American Softball League) in 1980, under the leadership of Cleveland owner Ted Stepien. The Bourbons continued in the reduced numbers of the APSPL. Stepien placed NASL teams in several APSPL markets, including Cincinnati and Pittsburgh, also placing a team, the Lexington Stallions, in nearby Lexington, Kentucky. Stepien owned many of the NASL teams, including the Stallions. The owner of the Pittsburgh Hardhats of the APSPL brought a challenge in federal court in an attempt to prevent splitting the young professional sport. Donnie Rardin of the Bourbons was brought on by Stepien and would play for and serve as General Manager for Lexington, former Bourbon Dave Bair would play and manage the team, and ex-Bourbon pitcher Phil Schroer joined them on the Stallions.

Meanwhile, in 1980, the Bourbons were the APSPL regular season best with a record of 49–13 (.790) but lost in the first round of the playoffs to the Pittsburgh Hardhats 3–2. Steve Stewart (40–14 pitching record), Nick Nikitas (.464, 82 runs scored), former Detroit Caesar Jack Roudebush (.464, 3 HRs, 48 RBIs), Bill Gatti (.483, 21 HRs, 81 RBIs) and Greg Whitlock (.435, 2 HRs, 42 RBIs) won all-league honors in 1980; Gatti led the league in home-runs (21) and RBIs (81).

== The UPSL era ==
The NASL lasted just one season, and the APSPL combined with the NASL for 1980, although the only team from the NASL to come to the new United Professional Softball League (UPSL) was Milwaukee as other NASL franchises, including Lexington, disbanded. The Bourbons edged into the 1981 USPL playoff with a 36–24 (.600) and a third-place Western Division finish, 6 games back of Cincinnati, but improving as the season went along. It was a season of drama in Louisville as team moved manager Steve Coffman to the front office after a slow start, replacing him with player-manager Cobbie Harrison, catcher Jim Roudebush left the team, and then the team voted to release "talented but temperamental" outfielder Mike LaFever for unprofessional conduct, but would end up allowing him to return later in the season. The team also lost outfielder Chuck Winders late in the season when he quit the team after an on-field fight with Bill Gatti in Milwaukee, which was followed that same night by player-manager Cobbie Harrison getting into a fight with a Milwaukee fan as the team loaded onto the bus post-game, resulting in Harrison's mother breaking her hip in the fracas.

The drama flowed into the post-season as the Bourbons beat the Schlitz 3–0 (5–4, 13–4, 11–10) in the first round with Jimmie Hammond's sacrifice fly scoring Rick Wilson in the 7th inning of game three to sweep the opening series. The Bourbons would take on the league-best Cincinnati Suds in the semi-finals, winning 3–2 (2–10, 6–7, 13–12, 4–3, 6–5), including a nail-biting 6–5 victory in the deciding 5th game. The Suds took the first two games, the Bourbons responded by winning the next two, with Dave Whitlock singling in the winning run in a 4–4 game in the bottom of the 7th of the 4th game in the series, only to have the post-game marred when Kentucky fans threw beer cans at Cincinnati players, leading Cincinnati manager Gerry Weidmann to declare, "I can't stand this place." In the 5th game, former Sud Mike O'Brien singled in Rick Wilson in the bottom of the seventh to give the Bourbons a shot at the title. Bill Gatti said, "it was a team victory, the kind that puts chills down your spine."

Having beaten the two teams with better records in their division, Kentucky would advance to the first UPSL World Series against the New England Pilgrims. Kentucky dropped the opener, but an impassioned Cobbied Harrison hit three home-runs in the second game to keep the series competitive. The Bourbons swept a pair behind the hitting of Greg Whitlock and Dave Whitlock to go up 3–1 as the best of 9 series moved to the Pilgrims home field. An opening split with the series now in Connecticut set up a double-header. New England took the first game 8–6 to tighten the series, but an explosive start with Rick Wilson homering, Cobbie Harrison with a triple and timely hitting from Greg Kemp and Mike O'Brien, the 14–11 victory secured the first pro softball title for Kentucky 5–3 (12–17, 11–7, 12–6, 16–5, 10–11, 14–11, 6–8, 14–11).

Bourbon Greg Whitlock (.581, 5 RBIs, 3 2Bs, 14 runs scored) was the MVP of the 1981 World Series and Bill Gatti the league MVP, winning the triple crown of home runs (38), RBIs (99) and batting average (.622). Steve Stewart (35–20 pitching), Greg Whitlock (.474, 2 HRs, 37 RBIs) and Dave Whitlock (.443, 19 HRs, 65 RBIs) made the all-UPSL squad with Bourbon player-manager Cobbie Harrison. Rick Wilson, former basketball standout at the University of Louisville, had played with the Atlanta Hawks for two seasons. He would begin playing for the Bourbons in 1981 when his NBA career ended, earning regular playing time as an outfielder, and contributed in the World Series win over New England.

In 1982 the Bourbons won the Western Division with a 38–23 (.623) record, earning a first-round bye, but lost in the playoff semifinals to the Milwaukee Schlitz, 3–2, with a 23–22 loss in the 5th game with Milwaukee scoring in the final inning. The Schlitz advanced and beat Detroit Softball City 5–2 to win the 1982 UPSL title. Bill Gatti (.554, 46 HRs), Greg Whitlock (.535) and Ken Parker (36 HRs, 107 RBIs ) represented Kentucky on the all-league team. Steve Stewart went 35–20 pitching for the Bourbons and Pat Paulson had a strong year hitting .503 with 91 runs scored. Rick Wilson had left the Bourbons early in the 1981 season. The UPSL folded after the conclusion of the 1982 season, ending professional play and returning players to the amateur leagues. The demise of the Bourbons coincided with the arrival of minor-league AAA baseball in Louisville with the Louisville Redbirds who would go on to set records for minor league baseball attendance in 1982.

Bourbon third-baseman Bill Gatti is a member of the American Softball Association Hall of Fame, inducted in 2000, and is also honored in the United States Slowpitch Softball Association (USSSA) Hall of Fame.

== Kentucky Bourbons year-by-year record ==
| Year | Record | Pct | Finish | Division | Playoffs | League |
|---|---|---|---|---|---|---|
| 1977 | 40–16 | .714 | 1st | Central | Semi-Finals | APSPL |
| 1978 | 30–34 | .469 | 3rd | Central | – | APSPL |
| 1979 | 48–15 | .762 | 1st | Central | World Series (runner-up) | APSPL |
| 1980 | 48–16 | .750 | 1st | – | Semi-Finals | APSPL |
| 1981 | 36–24 | .600 | 3rd | Western | Champions | UPSL |
| 1982 | 38–23 | .623 | 1st | Western | Semi-Finals | UPSL |

== See also ==
- Sports in Louisville, Kentucky
