= Chicago Storm (softball) =

Professional softball team

The Chicago Storm were a professional 12-inch softball team that played in the American Professional Slo-Pitch League (APSPL) during the 1977 and 1978 seasons. They played their home games at the Windy City Softball Complex in Bridgeview, Illinois, in 1977 and then at two different parks in 1978—Lions Park in Mt. Prospect, Illinois, and Community Park in Addison, Illinois.

== APSPL history ==
During the late 1970s and early 1980s, several men's professional slow-pitch softball leagues were formed in the United States to build on the growth and talent in the booming men's amateur game during this period. The American Professional Slo-Pitch League (APSPL) was the first such league, launching in an era of experimentation in professional sports leagues. The APSPL was formed in 1977 by former World Football League executive Bill Byrne who would go on to form the Women's Professional Basketball League. Former New York Yankees star Whitey Ford was the first league commissioner.

== Chicago Storm ==
The Chicago Storm began play in the inaugural APSPL season in 1977, finishing with a record of 22–34 (.393), in 4th place in the Midwestern Division, 20 games behind division-winners Detroit Caesars. The Storm were managed by former Chicago Cub Milt Pappas. The Caesars would go on to win the first pro softball World Series 4–0 over the Baltimore Monuments with Mike Nye of Detroit honored as the series MVP. But Benny Holt (.690 BA, 89 HRs, 187 RBIs, 144 runs scored, 25 walks) of Chicago was the talk of the league in winning the triple crown and the league MVP trophy. Holt and Buddy Haines (.605, 42 HRs, 100 RBIs, 101 runs scored) made the all-pro team for 1977. Storm players Ron Olesiak (.581, 55 HRs, 112 RBIs), Tom Spahn (.541, 49 HRs, 129 RBIs), Mike Krolicki (.511, 22 HRs, 75 RBIs) and Dave Shortz (.506, 33 HRs, 56 RBIs) had stellar seasons for Chicago. Former Cub Gene Hiser played for the Storm in 1977.

1978 was no more kind to the Storm as they ended the season with an abysmal 11–53 (.172) record, 4th in the division and 38 games behind Detroit. Detroit would repeat again as APSPL champions, defeating the Minnesota Norsemen with series MVP Bert Smith hitting 15–16 (.940). Ron Ford of Detroit was the league MVP. Benny Holt (.526, 50 HRs, 130 RBIs) was again outstanding for the Storm and was the team's sole representative on the all-pro team. Tommy Spahn (.539, 34 HRs, 101 RBIs), Mike Krolicki (.511, 13 HRs, 59 RBIs) and Ron Olesiak (.509, 20 HRs, 47 RBIs) again performed well in support. The team suffered with poor attendance and financial instability led to the league taking over the Storm in 1979. The team would be without a home and played home games on the road by the end of the season, and the team disbanded at the end of the year.

== Chicago Nationwide Advertising ==
Professional softball returned briefly to Chicago in 1980 when a rival league, the North American Softball League (NASL), was formed by Cleveland Stepien's Competitors owner Ted Stepien, who put forward a team called Chicago Nationwide Advertising, named after the advertising company owned by Stepien. The team played at Lou Boudreau Field in Harvey, Illinois, and former Chicago Cub Joe Pepitone served as team president and played first-base. Pepitone would get a suspension during the year for "conduct detrimental to professional softball" when NASL Commissioner Robert Brown suspended him for 6 games and then was lost to the season in August with a thigh injury. The team was managed by local softball legend Eddie Zolna.

It was an excellent regular season for CNA as Chicago finished 43–19 (.694), 2nd in the Western Division to the Milwaukee Schlitz. The Schlitz would defeat Chicago in the playoffs 4–2 and go on to win the NASL World Series in 1980 over the Detroit Auto Kings 5–12 behind the hitting of Ken Parker (.586, 16 RBIs) in the series. Former Chicago Storm star Benny Holt was now with Cleveland, but Ron Olesiak (.555, 34 HRs, 124 RBIs) of Chicago won the league MVP trophy, and Chicago added all-pro seasons from Mike Krolicki (27–6 pitching record), Buddy Haines (.518, 27 HRS, 115 RBIs), Tommy Spahn (.527, 15 HRs, 97 RBIs), Curt Dusek (.413 BA), Willie Simpson (.506, 23 doubles, 13 triples) and Jake Jakobi (.520 BA). Olesiak, Dusek, Simpson, Spahn represented Chicago at the mid-season All-Star game and Zolna managed the West team. The NASL lasted one season before combining with the APSPL to form a new league, the United Professional Softball League (UPSL). That league disbanded in 1982, bringing an end to the professional era of men's softball in the US. Many players returned to the competitive leagues in the Chicago area, especially the 16-inch game in the region.

The Chicago Nationwide Advertising team featured two members of the American Softball Association Hall of Fame—manager Eddie Zolna and catcher Willie Simpson.

== Chicago year-by-year record ==
| Year | Team name | Record | Pct | Finish | Division | Playoffs | League |
|---|---|---|---|---|---|---|---|
| 1977 | Storm | 22–34 | ..393 | 3rd | Midwest | - | APSPL |
| 1978 | Storm | 11–53 | .172 | 4th | Midwest | - | APSPL |
| 1980 | Nationwide Advertising | 43–19 | .694 | 2nd | Midwest | Semi-Finals | NASL |
