= Cleveland Jaybirds =

US professional softball team

The Cleveland Jaybirds (1977–78), later named the Cleveland Stepien's Competitors (1979–80) and finally the Cleveland Competitors (1982), were a professional softball team that played in three professional softball leagues between 1978 and 1982 at two different locations in the Cleveland, Ohio area.

== History ==
During the late 1970s and early 1980s, several men's professional slow-pitch softball leagues were formed in the United States to build on the growth and talent in the booming men's amateur game during this period. The American Professional Slo-Pitch League (APSPL) was the first such league, launching in an era of experimentation in professional sports leagues. The APSPL was formed in 1977 by former World Football League front-office executive Bill Byrne with former New York Yankees star Whitey Ford as commissioner. Jay Friedman, owner of Erie Sheet Metal, launched the Cleveland Jaybirds in the inaugural 1977 APSPL season. Don Rardin, Sr., owner of the Kentucky Bourbons, owned 50% of the Jaybirds as well. The team began play at Rose Field in the Brookside Reservation in Cleveland.

Ted Stepien bought the team in 1978 and would change the name to the Cleveland Stepien's Competitors for the 1979 season. Stepien had opened a series of private dining rooms called Competitors Clubs in Cleveland and the team name was to promote the restaurants. In 1980, two teams, Milwaukee and Cleveland broke away to form the North American Softball League (NASL) under the leadership of Stepien, who owned six of the eight teams in the league (only Ft. Wayne and Milwaukee had non-Stepien ownership), while the APSPL continued with just six teams. The NASL would last just one season. Cleveland moved to playing at Daniel's Field, Willoughby, Ohio in 1980 and Stepien also purchased the Cleveland Cavaliers of the NBA that year. Also in 1980, Stepien held a promotional event for the league in Cleveland in which he dropped softballs from the 52nd floor of Terminal Tower to be caught by outfielders from the Competitors. The balls were estimated to be traveling at 144 mph by the time they reached the street, damaging cars and injuring several spectators. One ball was caught by Cleveland outfielder Mike Zarefoss.

In 1981 the APSPL merged with NASL to create the United Professional Softball League (UPSL), but only the Milwaukee franchise came from the NASL to the new league as the other NASL teams folded. No Cleveland team played in the 1981 season. The merged league competed for two seasons with the Competitors returning in 1982. The Competitors franchise and the league disbanded after the 1982 season. Two members of the American Softball Association Hall of Fame played for Cleveland - Steve Loya (inducted in 1993) and Mike Macenko (inducted in 2007). Macenko is also a member of United States Slowpitch Softball Association (USSSA) Hall of Fame.

== APSPL era ==
The Jaybirds had a record of 32-24 (.571) in the inaugural 1977 APSPL season. They defeated Milwaukee Copper Hearth 2–1 in the first round of the playoffs before losing 2–1 to the eventual champion Detroit Caesars in the semi-finals. It was a competitive series against the league-best Caesars as pitcher Shelly Hoffman took advantage of the spacious Trechter Park in Cincinnati to negate the power-bats of Detroit and outfielder Jim Vaccarina made some stellar defensive plays to upset Detroit in the opener of the best of three series. Detroit roared back in the second game (22-5), and Cleveland lost the shot at the upset 8-6 in the third game with 2-run homer by Caesar Gary Geister in the 4th inning making the difference. Detroit beat the Baltimore Monuments in the finals with Mike Nye of Detroit as the World Series MVP. Triple-crown winner Benny Holt (.690, 89 HRs, 187 RBIs) of the Chicago Storm was the APSPL MVP. Rick Petrunyak (.538, 16 HRs, 70 RBIs, and a league-leading 32 doubles) and Bobby Reid (.535,8 HRS, 53 RBIs and a league-leading 15 triples) represented the Jaybirds on the 1977 all-pro team. Doc Booker (.603, 14 HRs, 47 RBIs), Steve Loya (.480, 37 HRs, 84 RBIs) and Jack Gansheimer (.502, 44 HRs, 114 RBIs) had strong years for Cleveland as well.

Cleveland finished the 1978 season with a 32-32 (.500) record, advancing to the playoffs, defeating the Philadelphia Athletics 2–1 in the first round. The Detroit Caesars again got in their way, defeating the Jaybirds 2-0 (27-22, 30-24) in a high scoring series. Detroit would repeat as APSPL champions, defeating the Minnesota Norsemen 4–0 with series MVP Bert Smith hitting 15-16 (.940). Jim Bizzell (.566, 45 HRs, 108 RBIs) of Cleveland made the all-APSPL team. Jaybird Bobby Reid (.519, 24 HRs, 88 RBIs, 120 runs scored) was solid again and Dana Andry (.517, 44 HRs, 117 RBIs) provided additional power for Cleveland.

The team, now playing as the Stepien's Competitors, in 1979 and finished the year 33-31 (.516), again advancing to the playoffs. Cleveland lost in the first round 3–0 to eventual the eventual champions Milwaukee Schlitz, with World Series and league MVP Rick Weiterman, who defeated Kentucky 5–3 in the championship. Of note, the games were broadcast nationwide on the new start-up sports network ESPN as their first live games covered.

Roger Wilt of Cleveland made the all-APSPL team in 1979. Fred Miller (.477, 29 HRs, 86 RBIs) had a stellar year and Jim Bizzell (37 HRs), Dana Andry (31 HRs) and Dave Watson (26 HRs) added power to the Competitors line-up.

== Cleveland in the NASL ==
Instability in other markets and internal political fighting saw three teams (Fort Wayne, Cleveland and Milwaukee) leave the APSPL in 1980 to form the North American Softball League (NASL) under the leadership of Stepien. Cleveland went 31-32 (.492) in 1980, advancing to the playoffs where the Stepien's Competitors lost to the Detroit Auto Kings, also owned by Stepien, 4–1 in the first round. Milwaukee would win the NASL World Series over Detroit 5–2 with Schlitz outfielder Ken Parker (.586, 16 RBIs) honored as series MVP. Ron Olesiak (.555, 34 HRs, 124 RBIs) of Chicago Nationwide Advertising was the league MVP. Doc Booker (.483, 23 HRs, 70 RBIs), Dana Andry (34 HRs, 85 RBIs) and Benny Holt (.533, 42 HRs, 95 RBIs) of Cleveland made the all-NASL team.

== Competitors in the UPSL ==
The APSPL and the NASL then merged to form the United Professional Softball League in 1981, although only Milwaukee came to the new league from the NASL as the other franchises disbanded. Stepien disbanded all 6 of his NASL teams for the 1981 UPSL season, moving his efforts to the National Slo-Pitch Conference (NSPC), an amateur softball competition that was drawing significant team sponsorship and talent from the professional game. Stepien fielded the Nationwide Advertising team in the 1981 competition, keeping much of the team from the 1980 NASL Cleveland team together, and finished 2nd to powerhouse Howard's Western Steer out of North Carolina in the 1981 NSPC.

1981 NSPC Championship Highlights

The bulk of that 1981 Nationwide Advertising team would return to the professional ranks as the Cleveland Competitors for 1982 UPSL season. Cleveland had a stellar regular season in 1982, finishing 46-17 (.730), winning the Eastern Division and receiving a first-round bye in the playoffs. But Cleveland ran into a hot Detroit Softball City club and lost in the semi-finals 3-2 despite impressive power displays from Dana Andry (7 HRs) and Mike Macenko (5 HRs). Milwaukee, with World Series MVP Dick Laba (.667 BA), would win the 1982 UPSL World Series against Detroit 5-1. Making the all-pro team for the Competitors were Paul Wright (.566 BA), Steve Blanchett (.558, 42 HRs, 120 RBIs), Mike Macenko (.440, 63 HRs, 140 RBIs) and UPSL MVP Dana Andry (.618, 65 HRs, 128 RBIs, 125 runs scored, 46-17 pitching).

The UPSL and the Competitors folded at the end of the season ending the era of men's professional softball in the US.

== Cleveland year-by-year record ==
Year	Team name	Record	Pct	Finish	Division	Playoffs	League
1977	Jaybirds	32-24	.571	2nd	Central	Semi-Finals	APSPL
1978	Jaybirds	32-32	.500	2nd	Central	Semi-Finals	APSPL
1979	Stepien's Competitors	33-31	.516	3rd	Central	1st Round	APSPL
1980	Stepien's Competitors	30-28	.517	2nd	Eastern	1st Round	NASL
1982	Competitors	46-17	.730	1st	Eastern	Semi-Finals	UPSL
