= Milwaukee Schlitz =

Professional softball team

The Milwaukee Schlitz were a professional softball team that played in three men's professional softball leagues from 1977 through 1982 at Wilson Stadium in Milwaukee, Wisconsin.

== History ==
Milwaukee began play in the inaugural 1977 American Professional Slo-Pitch League (APSPL) season as the Milwaukee Copper Hearth. The Copper Hearth was initially an amateur softball club that, in 1969, had won the Amateur Softball Association national championship. Milwaukee joined the fledgling APSPL, formed by former World Football League executive Bill Byrne, who would go on to launch the Women's Professional Basketball League. Former New York Yankees player Whitey Ford was brought on to serve as league commissioner. The club took its name from its first sponsor, a blue-collar tavern in Milwaukee, the Copper Hearth, owned by John Korinek Sr. Joseph Schlitz Brewing Company took over sponsorship in 1978 and the team would play through their final professional season as the Milwaukee Schlitz.

== The APSPL era ==
Milwaukee was led by local softball standout Phil Higgins, along with Doug Czaplewski, Jim Dillard and Ken Parker in 1977. The Copper Hearth finished with the third-best record in the league at 38–17 (.696), three games behind league-leading Detroit Caesars, but were upset in the first round of the playoffs by the Cleveland Jaybirds 2–1. Benny Holt of the Chicago Storm was the league MVP with Detroit winning the 1977 APSPL World Series. Making the All-APSPL team from Milwaukee were Tom Gorski (.500 BA, 22 HRs, 75 RBIs, 17–8 Pitching), Doug Czaplewski (.603 BA, 92 runs scored), Jim Dillard (.544, 34 HRs, 117 RBIs), Phil Higgins (.611, 41 HRs, 131 RBIs) and Ken Parker (.545, 37 HRs, 109 RBIs).

In 1978, Parker and Higgins once again led the team, now the Milwaukee Schlitz, and the team produced a 38–28 (.583) record, finishing in third place in the highly competitive Midwestern Division, but missing the APSPL playoffs with their division finish, and despite having a better record than 3 playoff teams, including the two teams from the Eastern Division (New England Pilgrims and Philadelphia A's). The Detroit Caesars repeated as APSPL champions in 1978 with Ron Ford of Detroit winning the league MVP award. Phil Higgins (.569, 49 HRs, 137 RBIs) and Ken Parker (.634, 37 HRs, 121 RBIs) made the all -star team with Dave Holz (.528, 16 HRs) and Paul Wenzel (.521, 12 HRs, 73 RBIs) contributing well.

Focused on taking the next step, the Schlitz were led in 1979 by APSPL all-stars Phil Higgins (.531, 18 HRs, 89 RBIs) and Dennis Graser (.486, 22 HRs, 87 RBIs), as well as league and eventual APSPL World Series MVP Rick Weiterman (.557, 9 HRs, 69 RBIs, 37–18 Pitching). Milwaukee finished with a 40–23 (.635) record, winning the Midwestern Division. Milwaukee beat Cleveland 3–0 in the first round of the APSPL playoffs and then beat the two-time APSPL champion Detroit Caesars 3–0 in the semi-finals, advancing to play the Kentucky Bourbons in the World Series. The series were broadcast nationwide as the first televised event on the new start-up sports network ESPN. Milwaukee beat Kentucky 5–3 to win the APSPL championship.

== 1980 NASL Champions ==
Instability in other markets and internal political fighting saw three teams (Fort Wayne, Cleveland and Milwaukee) leave the APSPL to form the North American Softball League (NASL), under the leadership of Cleveland owner (and eventual owner of the Cleveland Cavaliers) Ted Stepien. The APSPL continued with just 6 teams (down from 12 in each of the previous 3 seasons). Milwaukee dominated the new NASL with a league best 44–12 (.786) record with all-NASL performances from Dennis Graser (.480, 30 HRs, 98 RBIs), Phil Higgins .485, 16 HRs, 95 RBIs, 33 doubles), Rick Weiterman (45–13 pitching), and Jim Dilliard (22 doubles). The Schlitz would take on Chicago Nationwide Advertising in the first round, beating Chicago 9–13, 10–7, 17–12, 16–12, 10–17, 22–17; (4–2). Milwaukee defeated the Detroit Auto Kings 5–2 (19–11, 10–12, 12–16, 22–13, 13–4, 12–3, 11–9) to win the only NASL World Series. Ken Parker of Milwaukee would take the World Series MVP trophy while Ron Olesiak of Chicago was the league MVP.

== The UPSL era ==
The NASL and the APSPL merged after the 1980 season to form a new league, the United Professional Softball League (UPSL). Milwaukee had an initial set-back in 1981 as perennial all-star Phil Higgins elected to play amateur baseball to start the season but would return to the team in August, just before the playoffs. Still, the Schlitz finished with a 37–21 (.638) record in 1981, 6 games behind the Cincinnati Suds in the Western Division. The Schlitz would get swept by the eventual league champion Kentucky Bourbons in the first-round 5–4, 13–4, 11–10; (3–0). Bill Gatti of Kentucky won the league MVP award. Dennis Graser (.500 BA, 26 HRs, 76 RBIs) was the only Schlitz to make the all-league team in 1981. Dick Laba batted .485 and Rick Weiterman had a 36–21 pitching record in support.

The Schlitz finished with a 32–32 (.500) record in 1982, their worst record in their 6 seasons of professional softball. But Milwaukee advanced to the playoffs, beating the Cincinnati Suds in the first round 11–4, 11–8, 13–4; (3–0) and then upset the Kentucky Bourbons, going to a 5th and deciding game with Milwaukee winning 23–22, for a 3–2 (10–7, 4–7, 9–21, 14–10, 23–22) victory in the semi-finals. Milwaukee went on to defeat Detroit Softball City 9–8, 8–3, 7–10, 13–11, 12–7, 39–6; (5–1), with Dick Laba of the Schlitz honored as the MVP. Schlitz players Rick Weiterman (.514 BA), Dennis Graser (43 HRs, 122 RBIs), Phil Higgins (.572, 40 HRs, 125 RBIs, 24 doubles) and Derek Gallagher (.560 BA) made the all-league team with Dana Andry of the Cleveland Competitors winning the league MVP in the final season of professional softball in the United States. The Schlitz lost their sponsor when the Stroh Brewing Company purchased Schlitz in 1982 and elected not to continue the team after the season. The UPSL also folded after the 1982 season, bringing the era of men's professional softball to an end.

Milwaukee first-baseman Dennis Graser is a member of the American Softball Association Hall of Fame, inducted in 2000. Schlitz pitcher Rick Weiterman was similarly honored and is in the United States Slowpitch Softball Association (USSSA) Hall of Fame.

== Milwaukee year-by-year record ==
Year	Team name	Record	Pct	Finish	Division	Playoffs	League
1977	Copper Hearth	39–17	.696	2nd	Midwest	1st Round	APSPL
1978	Schlitz	38–28	.583	3rd	Midwest	–	APSPL
1979	Schlitz	40–23	.635	1st	Midwest	Champions	APSPL
1980	Schlitz	47–13	.786	1st	Midwest	Champions	NASL
1981	Schlitz	37–21	.638	2nd	Western	1st Round	UPSL
1982	Schlitz	32–32	.500	3rd	Midwest	Champions	UPSL
