= Bill Byrne (sports entrepreneur) =

Sports entrepreneur

- Born: William Joseph Byrne; June 14, 1936; Stoutsville, Ohio, U.S.
- Died: March 6, 2007 (aged 70); Columbus, Ohio, U.S.
- Occupations: businessman, sports entrepreneur, league commissioner
- Years active: WFL (1974–75), APSPL (1977–1980), WBL (1978–81), WABA (1984)

Bill Byrne (14 June 1936 – 6 March 2007) was a sports entrepreneur who founded the first women's professional basketball league in the United States. Byrne was born in Stoutsville, Ohio and founded the National Scouting Association (NSA) which represented student-athletes from the collegiate and amateur ranks to seek professional football opportunities. He then founded the Columbus Bucks, a semi-professional football team, playing in the Midwest Football League (MFL) and served as commissioner. Byrne was hired by the Chicago Fire of the start-up World Football League in 1974 as the Player Personnel Director. When that team folded toward the end of the season, Byrne then went to the Shreveport Steamer for the 1975 WFL season in a similar role. The World Football League folded toward the end of the season.

Byrne then went on to found the American Professional Slo-Pitch Softball League (APSPL) in 1977, the first professional softball league in the US, attracting owners such as Mike Ilitch with the Detroit Caesars and Ted Stepien with the Cleveland Competitors. Byrne was instrumental in bringing the Columbus All-Americans franchise to Columbus, Ohio. Byrne brought on former New York Yankee star Whitey Ford to serve as the first commissioner. The All-Americans last just one season, but the APSPL lasted until 1981 when it merged with the United Professional Softball League (UPSL). That league disbanded in 1982.

His most notable achievement was the founding of the Women's Professional Basketball League (WBL) which began play in December 1978. The league lasted until 1981. Byrne was undeterred when that league failed and attempted to launch the Women's American Basketball Association (WABA) in 1984 which lasted one season. Byrne and his son Hubie also worked on plans for a new football league with former NFL player Jim Spavital in 1989 that never came to fruition.

He retired to his home in Columbus, Ohio and died in 2007.
