= List of defunct Pennsylvania sports teams =

This is a list of former sports teams from the US state of Pennsylvania:

== Australian rules football ==
=== American leagues ===
==== United States Australian Football League ====
- Lehigh Valley Crocs
- Pittsburgh Wallabies

== Baseball ==
=== Major baseball leagues ===
==== American Association (1882–1891) ====
- Philadelphia Athletics (1882–1891)
- Pittsburgh Alleghenys (1882–1886) (Now the Pittsburgh Pirates of the National League)

==== Federal League (1913–1915) ====
- Pittsburgh Rebels (1913–1915)

==== National Association of Base Ball Players (1861–1870) ====
- Athletic of Philadelphia

==== National Association of Professional Base Ball Players (1871–1875) ====
- Philadelphia Athletics (1871–1875)
- Philadelphia White Stockings (1873–1875) (also sometimes called "Pearls" or "Phillies")
- Philadelphia Centennials (1875)

==== Negro leagues (1885–1951) ====
- Harrisburg Giants (1924–1929)
- Hilldale Daisies (1910–1932)
- Philadelphia Giants
- Philadelphia Pythians
- Philadelphia Stars (1934–1948)
- Philadelphia Tigers (1928)
- Homestead Grays (1929–1948)
- Pittsburgh Crawfords (1931–1938)
- Pittsburgh Keystones

==== Players' League (1890) ====
- Philadelphia Quakers/Athletics (PL/AA) (1890)
- Pittsburgh Burghers (1890)

==== Union Association (1884) ====
- Altoona Mountain Citys (1884)
- Philadelphia Keystones (1884)
- Pittsburgh Stogies (1884)

=== Minor League Baseball ===
==== Atlantic League of Professional Baseball ====
- Lehigh Valley Black Diamonds (2000–2001)
- Pennsylvania Road Warriors (2002–2004)

==== Eastern League (1923–current) ====
- Allentown Brooks (1935–1936)
- Allentown Cardinals (1935–1936)
- Allentown Chiefs (1957)
- Allentown Red Sox (1935–1936)
- Johnstown Johnnies (1955–1956)
- Johnstown Red Sox (1961)
- Lancaster Red Roses (1896–1961)
- Philadelphia Phillies (minor league) (1892)
- Reading Brooks (1935–1936)
- Reading Indians (1952–1957) (Now Reading Phillies)
- Reading Red Sox (1933–1965) (Now Pittsfield Red Sox)
- Scranton Red Sox
- Wilkes-Barre Barons (1933–1972)
- Wilkes-Barre Indians
- Williamsport A's
- Williamsport Bills (1987–1991)
- Williamsport Grays (1924–1962)
- Williamsport Mets (1964–1967)
- Williamsport Tigers
- Williamsport Tomahawks
- York Pirates (1884–1969)
- York White Roses (1884–1969)

==== Frontier League (1993–current) ====
- Erie Sailors (1994) (became Johnstown Steal)
- Johnstown Johnnies (1995–1997) (renamed Johnstown Johnnies)
- Johnstown Johnnies (1998–2002) (now Florence Y'alls)

==== International League (1885–current) ====
- Scranton/Wilkes-Barre Red Barons (1989–2006) (renamed Scranton/Wilkes-Barre Yankees from 2007 to 2012 and Scranton/Wilkes-Barre RailRiders from 2013 to 2026) (Now Scranton/Wilkes-Barre Highlanders, renamed in 2027)

==== New York–Penn League (1939–2020) ====
- Erie Cardinals
- Erie Orioles (ended 1990) (changed name to "Sailors")
- Erie Sailors (1990–1992)
- Erie Tigers
- Williamsport Astros (1971–1972)
- Williamsport Red Sox (1971–1972)

==== Heartland League ====
- Altoona Rail Kings (1997)

==== North Atlantic League ====
- Altoona Rail Kings (1996)

==== Northern League ====
- Allentown Ambassadors (1997–2003)

== Basketball ==
=== Major basketball leagues ===
==== National Basketball Association (NBA) ====
- Philadelphia Warriors (1946–1962) now the Golden State Warriors
- Pittsburgh Ironmen (1946–1947)

=== Minor basketball leagues ===
==== American Basketball Association (1967–1976) ====
- Pennsylvania Pit Bulls (2004–2005)
- Pittsburgh Condors (1970–1972)
- Pittsburgh Hardhats (2004)
- Pittsburgh Pipers (1967–1968)

==== American Basketball League ====
- Scranton Miners (1950?–1996)

==== Continental Basketball Association ====
- Pittsburgh Piranhas (1994–1995)
- Pittsburgh Xplosion (2005–2008)
- Wilkes-Barre Barons (1914–1978)

==== National Alliance of Basketball Leagues(1938–) ====
- Philadelphia Tapers (1962–1963)

==== United States Basketball League ====
- Philadelphia Aces
- Philadelphia Spirit
- Pennsylvania ValleyDawgs (1999–2007)

==== Women's Basketball League ====
- Philadelphia Fox 1979 (folded mid-season)

== Football ==
=== Major football leagues ===
==== Early athletic clubs ====
- Allegheny Athletic Association
- Duquesne Country and Athletic Club
- Franklin Athletic Club
- Greensburg Athletic Association
- Homestead Library & Athletic Club
- Jeanette Athletic Association
- Latrobe Athletic Association
- McKeesport Olympics
- Oil City Athletic Club
- Pittsburgh Athletic Club (football)

==== American Association (football) ====
- Bethlehem Bulldogs
- Wilkes-Barre Bullets
- Erie Vets

==== American Football League (1926) ====
- Philadelphia Quakers (1926)

==== American Football League (1936) ====
- Pittsburgh Americans

==== Anthracite League ====
- Coaldale Big Green
- Gilberton Cadamounts
- Shenandoah Yellow Jackets
- Wilkes-Barre Barons (football)

==== Eastern League of Professional Football ====
- All-Lancaster Red Roses
- Bethlehem Bears
- Mount Carmel Wolverines
- Shenandoah Red Jackets

==== National Football League ====
- Dallas Texans (NFL) (1951–1952) (Traveling team based in Hershey, Pennsylvania)
- Frankford Yellow Jackets (1924–1928)
- Pottsville Maroons (1925–1928)

===== World War II merger teams =====
- Chicago-Pittsburgh "Card-Pitt" (1944)
- Pitt-Phil "Steagles" (1943)

==== Mid Continental Football League ====
- Erie Hawks

==== National Football League (1902) ====
- Philadelphia Athletics (NFL)
- Philadelphia Phillies (NFL)
- Pittsburgh Stars

==== United States Football League ====
- Philadelphia Stars (1983–1985)
- Pittsburgh Maulers (1984)

==== World Football League ====
- Philadelphia Bell (1974–1975)

Pennsylvania Professional Football League (1946–1949)

- Eastern Division
  - Shamokin Indians
  - Pottsville Maroons
  - Shenandoah Presidents
  - Allentown Buccaneers
  - York Roses
  - Harrisburg Senators
  - Philadelphia Yellow Jackets
- Western Division
  - McKeesport-Duquesne Ironmen
  - New Kensington Alumineers
  - Johnstown Clippers
  - McKees Rocks Rockets
  - Altoona Mountanineers
  - Jeannette Boosters

Anthracite Professional Football League (1949)

- Shamokin Maroons
- Tamaqua
- Mahanoy City
- Hazleton

=== Arena/indoor football ===
==== Arena Football League ====
- Pittsburgh Gladiators (1987–1990) (now the Tampa Bay Storm)

==== American Indoor Football Association ====
- Johnstown Riverhawks (2005–2007)
- Erie Freeze (2005–2007)

==== Continental Football League ====
- Philadelphia Bulldogs 1965–1966

==== Indoor Football League ====
- Erie Invaders (2000)

==== National Indoor Football League ====
- Johnstown J Dogs (2000–2001)

== Hockey ==
=== Major hockey associations ===
==== National Hockey League ====
- Pittsburgh Pirates (NHL) (1925–1930)
- Philadelphia Quakers (NHL) (1930–1931)

==== World Hockey Association ====
- Philadelphia Blazers (1972–1973)

==== Western Pennsylvania Hockey League ====
- Duquesne Athletic Club (1908–1909)
- Duquesne Country and Athletic Club (1895–1901)
- Pittsburgh Athletic Club (1895–1904, 1907–1909)
- Pittsburgh Bankers (1899–1904, 1907–1909)
- Pittsburgh Keystones (1900–1904)
- Pittsburgh Lyceum (1907–1908)
- Pittsburgh Pirates (1907–1908)
- Pittsburgh Victorias (1902–1904)

=== Minor leagues ===
==== American Hockey League ====
- Erie Blades (1975–1982)
- Philadelphia Firebirds (1974–1979)
- Philadelphia Arrows (1927–1935) (Became Philadelphia Ramblers)
- Philadelphia Ramblers (1935–1941)
- Philadelphia Rockets (1941–1942)
- Philadelphia Phantoms (1996–2009)
- Pittsburgh Hornets (1936–1956, 1961–1967)

==== East Coast Hockey League/ECHL ====
- Erie Panthers (1988–1996)
- Johnstown Chiefs (1988–2010)

==== Eastern Hockey League ====
- Erie Blades (1979–1981)
- Hershey B'ars/Hershey Bears (1933–1938)
- Hershey Cubs (1938–1939)
- Johnstown Bluebirds (1941–1942)
- Johnstown Jets (1950–1977)
- Johnstown Red Wings (1979–1980)
- Philadelphia Falcons (1942–1946; 1951–1952)
- Philadelphia Ramblers (1955–1964)

==== International Hockey League (1929–1936) ====
- Pittsburgh Shamrocks (1935–1936)
- Pittsburgh Yellow Jackets (1915–1925, 1930–1932)

==== Mid-Atlantic Hockey League ====
- Mon Valley Thunder (2007–2008)
- Valley Forge Freedom (2007–2008)

==== North American Hockey League ====
- Keystone Ice Miners (2014–2015)
- Pittsburgh Forge (2001–2004)

==== Roller Hockey International ====
- Philadelphia Bulldogs (1994–1996)
- Pittsburgh Phantoms (1994)

== Lacrosse ==
=== Major American leagues ===
==== National Lacrosse League ====
- Pittsburgh Bulls (1990–1993)
- Pittsburgh CrosseFire (2000)
- Philadelphia Wings (1974–1975)
- Philadelphia Wings

== Soccer ==
=== Major leagues ===
==== North American Soccer League ====
- Philadelphia Atoms (1973–1976)
- Philadelphia Fury (1978–1980)

=== Minor leagues ===
==== Continental Soccer League ====
- Pittsburgh Stingers

==== American Soccer League ====
- Pennsylvania Stoners 1979–1983

==== Major Indoor Soccer League ====
- Pittsburgh Spirit (1978–1980)
- Philadelphia Fever (1978–1980)

==== National Professional Soccer League ====
- Pittsburgh Phantoms (1967)
- Philadelphia Spartans 1967

==== United Soccer Leagues Second Division ====
- Philadelphia Freedom (1994–1997)

==== USL Championship ====
- Penn FC (2003–2018; known as Harrisburg City Islanders before the 2018 season)

==== Women's United Soccer Association ====
- Philadelphia Charge 2002–2003

==== Women's Professional Soccer ====
- Philadelphia Independence 2010–2011

== Softball ==
=== Men's Professional Softball ===
==== APSPL, NASL, UPSL ====
- Pittsburgh Champions (1980, NASL)
- Pittsburgh Hardhats (1977–1982, APSPL, USPL)
- Philadelphia Athletics (1977–1980, APSPL)
