= Carl Beck =

American football player (1897–1963)

Profile
- Position: Fullback / Tailback / Tackle / Guard

Personal information
- Born: August 8, 1897; Harrisburg, Pennsylvania, U.S.
- Died: April 16, 1963 (aged 65); Harrisburg, Pennsylvania, U.S.
- Listed height: 5 ft 11 in (1.80 m)
- Listed weight: 195 lb (88 kg)

Career information
- High school: Harrisburg Tech (PA)
- College: Bucknell, Lafayette, West Virginia

Career history
- Buffalo All-Americans (1921); Pottsville Maroons (1922–1925); Bethlehem Bears (1926)

Awards and highlights
- Anthracite League champion (1924); Disputed NFL champion (1925); 1st Team All-Eastern League (1926)
- Stats at Pro Football Reference

Carl Beck
- Military career
- Allegiance: United States
- Branch: U.S. Army
- Service years: 1917-1919
- Unit: U.S. Army Ambulance Corps
- Conflicts: World War I

Carl Linnwood Beck (August 8, 1897 – April 16, 1963) was a professional football player from Harrisburg, Pennsylvania. After attending high school, Beck attended the West Virginia University, Bucknell University and Lafayette College. He made his professional debut in the National Football League (NFL) in 1921 with the Buffalo All-Americans. He played for the All-Americans for 1 year, before leaving the NFL. He later returned to the NFL in 1925 as a star with both the Pottsville Maroons and the Frankford Yellow Jackets. To date, he is considered by sports writers to be one of the greatest running backs ever developed in Pennsylvania. When not playing football, Beck worked as a police officer for the Harrisburg Bureau of Police.

== High school ==
Beck grew up in Allison Hill, Harrisburg, Pennsylvania and attended Harrisburg Technical High School located on Walnut Street. In 1918 and 1919 Beck helped the Tech Maroons win back-to-back state championships in football. In 1919 Beck and the Maroons won the high school national championship. At halfback Beck score 34 touchdowns, many on long runs. Beck totaled an amazing 445 points in his three years of high school. He scored six touchdowns in each of three games, and five in four more. He returned four kickoffs for touchdowns. In one 1919 game, Beck scored four touchdowns in the first seven minutes.

== NFL career ==
Professionally, he played in the American Professional Football Association, later known as the National Football League, for the Buffalo All-Americans for one season.

In 1922, the then-independent Pottsville Maroons attracted the sponsorship of several area businessmen. These men upgraded the club by luring talented pro players such as Benny Boynton, Stan Cofall and Beck to the team. In 1924 Beck helped the Maroons win the 1924 Anthracite League championship. This move placed Carl with his brother, Clarence, on the Maroons team. In 1925 the Maroons entered the NFL. That year Carl played on the Maroons team that won the 1925 NFL Championship, before it was stripped from the team due to a disputed rules violation.

In 1926 played for the Bethlehem Bears of the Eastern League of Professional Football. While with the Bears, Beck scored a touchdown in a game against Clifton Heights Black & Orange for a 10-0 Bears win. However, he and several other Bears players were mysteriously absent from the very next game against the Shenandoah Red Jackets. This move was supposedly a walk-out. As a result, manager, Gyp Downey, tried to ban all of the involved players from playing in the league. However, he withdrew his motion the very next week and the players returned to the team.

In a game against the Gilberton Catamounts Carl tackled Gilberton's halfback, future-Hall of Famer, Fritz Pollard, in the open field, to preserve a 9-0 win for the Bears. The Bethlehem would finish the season in second place.

Beck went on to receive first-team All-Eastern League honors in 1926. While he only scored two touchdowns, including one in non-league play, for the Bears, his strong running ability was a key component of the team's success.
