= 1923 Pottsville Maroons season =

National Football League team season

- Head coach: Stan Cofall
- Home stadium: Minersville Park

Results
- Record: 7–3–2

The 1923 Pottsville Maroons season was their 4th season in existence. The team played independently would go on to post a 7–3–2 record.

== Schedule ==
Game	Date	Opponent	Result	Record
1	September 16	Harrisburg, Pennsylvania	W 55–0	1–0
2	September 23	All-Philadelphia	W 33–0	2–0
3	September 30	Conshohocken Athletic Club	W 41–0	3–0
4	October 7	Avoca Buffaloes	W 38–0	4–0
5	October 14	Mount Carmel Wolverines	W 38–0	5–0
6	October 21	at Coaldale Big Green	L 7–10	5–1
7	October 28	Gilberton Catamounts	W 27–0	5–2
8	November 4	at Shenandoah Yellow Jackets	T 6–6	5–2–1
9	November 10	at Frankford Yellow Jackets	T 0–0	5–2–2
10	November 18	Gilberton Catamounts	L 7–16	5–3–2
11	November 25	Coaldale Big Green	L 0–3	5–4–2
12	November 29	Shenandoah Yellow Jackets	W 12–0	6–4–2
