= 1922 Pottsville Maroons season =

National Football League team season

- Head coach: Stan Cofall
- Home stadium: Minersville Park

Results
- Record: 4–5–2

The 1922 Pottsville Maroons season was their 3rd season in existence. The team played independently and would go on to post a 4–5–2 record.

== Schedule ==
Game	Date	Opponent	Result	Record	Venue	Attendance	Sources
1	October 1	Gilberton Catamounts	T 0–0	0–0–1	Minersville Park		
2	October 8	Shamokin, Pennsylvania	T 0–0	0–0–2	Minersville Park		
3	October 15	Bethlehem Thomas Athletic Club	W 13–0	1–0–2	Minersville Park		
4	October 22	Gilberton Catamounts	L 14–0	1–1–2	Minersville Park		
5	October 29	Mount Carmel Wolverines	W 7–0	2–1–2	Minersville Park		
6	November 5	at Shenandoah Yellow Jackets	W 13–0	3–1–2			
7	November 12	Philadelphia Hobart A.C.	W 20–7	4–1–2	Minersville Park		
8	November 19	at Mount Carmel Wolverines	L 0–27	4–2–2			
9	November 26	at Coaldale Big Green	L 3–14	4–3–2			
10	November 30	Shenandoah Yellow Jackets	L 2–26	4–4–2	Minersville Park		
11	November 25	Coaldale Big Green	L 0–14	4–5–2	Minersville Park		
Note: Thanksgiving Day: November 30
