= Bethlehem Bears =

American professional football team, 1926

General information
- Founded: 1926
- Folded: 1926
- Stadium: Fabricators Field
- Headquartered: Bethlehem, Pennsylvania, United States
- Colors: Brown, White

Personnel
- General manager: Michael "Gyp" Downey
- Head coach: Michael "Gyp" Downey

Team history
- Bethlehem Bears (1926)

League / conference affiliations
- Independent (-1925); Eastern League of Professional Football (1926)

The Bethlehem Bears were an early professional football team from Bethlehem, Pennsylvania. The team was initiated and formed by Michael "Gyp" Downey who served as player-coach and the team's manager. The Bears competed in the Eastern League of Professional Football in 1926.

== Carl Beck ==
The best known member of the team's line-up was Carl Beck, who won the 1924 Anthracite League championship with the Pottsville Maroons. He also won the 1925 NFL Championship with the Maroons before it was stripped from the team due to a disputed rules violation.

== 1926 season ==
The Bears began their 1926 league season against the Coaldale Big Green, was widely expected to contend for the new league's championship. Beck suffered an injury in the second half of the game and Bethlehem was defeated in a 16-0 shut-out. However, the Bears later rebounded in a 10-0 victory against the Clifton Heights Black & Orange. A few weeks later the Bears defeated the Gilberton Catamounts, featuring future Hall of Famer, Fritz Pollard, 9-0. This win set up a championship scenario for a game between the Bears and the All-Lancaster Red Roses.

=== 1926 Championship controversy ===
The Bears and the Red Roses were the top two teams in the league. On November 28, 1926 both teams meet for a game that would most likely determine the league champion. The Bears won the 3-0 due to a last minute field goal by Downey.

The Bears ended the season with 6-2-2 record against league opponents and a post-season victory over All-Lancaster. Bethlehem felt that these actions were enough to legitimize their claim to an Eastern League championship. However, there was some question regarding Bethlehem's claim to the championship. These questions may have been related to the introduction of several "ringers" into the Bears line-up for the team's final four games against Eastern League opponents. Local newspapers soon reported that the league awarded the title to the 5-2-3 All-Lancaster Red Roses. Presumably on the basis of that team's October victory over the second-place Gilberton Catamounts. After the season, Bethlehem offered the Pottsville Maroons of the National Football League $4,000 to play them at home. The Bears then lost to Pottsville in a lopsided defeat.

== 1926 All-Eastern League Selections ==
The Bears players elected to be 1926 "All-Eastern League" selections, as announced by league president Herman Meyer.

- Carl Beck 1st Team Right Halfback
- Mike Gaffney 2nd Team Left End
- Charlie Eastman 2nd Team Left Guard
