= 1922 Frankford Yellow Jackets season =

National Football League team season

- Home stadium: Brown's Field

Results
- Record: 13–0–1

The 1922 Frankford Yellow Jackets season resulted in the team finishing the year with 13–0–1 record. This included a 3–0–1 record against teams from the National Football League.

== Schedule ==
Game	Date	Opponent	Result	Record
1	September 30	Lykens	W 40–0	1–0
2	October 7	Edwardsville, Pennsylvania	W 31–0	2–0
3	October 14	Gilberton Catamounts	W 13–0	3–0
4	October 21	Orange Athletic Club	W 50–0	4–0
5	October 28	Shenandoah Yellow Jackets	W 29–3	5–0
6	November 4	Coaldale Big Green	W 14–0	6–0
7	November 11	Mount Carmel Wolverines	W 45–0	7–0
8	November 18	Holmesburg Athletic Club	W 13–6	8–0
9	November 24	Rochester Jeffersons*	W 20–7	9–0
10	November 30	New York Giants	W 12–3	10–0
11	December 2	Akron Pros*	W 6–3	11–0
12	December 9	Buffalo All-Americans*	T 3–3	11–0–1
13	December 16	Toledo Maroons*	W 12–0	12–0–1
14	December 17	at Atlantic City Roses	W 12–0	13–0–1

== Game notes ==
- Asterisk denotes a game against an NFL member in 1922.
