= John Alexander (linebacker) =

American football player (1896–1986)

Profile
- Positions: Tackle, Linebacker

Personal information
- Born: July 4, 1896; New York City, United States
- Died: August 5, 1986 (aged 90)

Career information
- College: Rutgers

Career history
- 1919: Massillon Tigers
- 1922: Milwaukee Badgers
- 1926: New York Giants
- Stats at Pro Football Reference

Other information
- Military career
- Allegiance: United States
- Branch: U.S. Army
- Service years: 1916–1918
- Units: Mexican Border Service; American Expeditionary Force
- Conflicts: Mexican Revolution: Pancho Villa Expedition; World War I: Western Front

John Alexander (July 4, 1896 – August 5, 1986) was a professional football player with the Massillon Tigers of the Ohio League and the independent Gilberton Cadamounts, Coaldale Big Green, Melrose Athletic Club and Millville Big Blue. He also played in the National Football League for the Milwaukee Badgers and New York Giants. He is best known for becoming the first person to have played outside linebacker.

== Military service ==
After graduating from South Side High School in Newark, New Jersey, Alexander worked in his father's jewelry business before enlisting in the United States Army. During his time in the Army, Alexander served under General John Pershing, who was attempting to end Pancho Villa's raids along the US-Mexican border in 1916. Shortly after being discharged, Alexander found himself again in the Army again as an officer fighting in the First World War.

== Rutgers ==
After the war, Alexander enrolled at Rutgers University. While enrolled at Rutgers, he played football under head coach George Sanford and his assistant coach Paul Robeson, who was an All-American end while at Rutgers in 1917 and 1918. According to Alexander it was Robeson's suggestion that led to him experimenting with a new style of defense, which eventually became the outside linebacker position.

== Pro football ==
Alexander and Robeson travelled to Massillon, Ohio in 1919. There they joined the Massillon Tigers of the "Ohio League" and would play football for money on Sundays. While with the Tigers Alexander played alongside the likes of Gus Dorais, Bob Higgins, Lou Little, Jock Sutherland, Tiny Thornhill, Greasy Neale and Knute Rockne. In 1919, the Tigers came in second in the "Ohio League".

When the National Football League was formed in 1920, Alexander did not join the league. He instead played for several independent teams such as the Gilberton Cadamounts, Coaldale Big Green, Melrose Athletic Club and Millville Big Blue. However, in 1922, he joined the NFL and played for the Milwaukee Badgers. On October 1, 1922, Alexander made football history while playing for the Badgers against the Chicago Cardinals. In that NFL game, he became the first person to ever play the outside linebacker position. While nobody though much of change in position at the time a reporter for the Milwaukee Sentinel reported on the new position but didn't refer to it as the outside linebacker. The name would come later.

After his stint with the Badgers, Alexander played on several teams located in the New York Metropolitan area. However, in 1926 he played for the New York Giants. Although he liked playing for them, John did not return for the 1927 season because, he was told that he had to take a cut in pay from $100 a game to $75. He played for several Metropolitan teams until 1930, when he was forced to retire due to tuberculosis.

== Sources ==
- Jim Campbell (1995). "John Alexander: Pro Football Pioneer" (PDF). Coffin Corner. 16 (2). Professional Football Researchers Association: 1–9. Archived from the original (PDF) on October 6, 2010.
- Chris Thorne (1983). "John Alexander: The First Outside Linebacker" (PDF). Coffin Corner. 4 (9). Professional Football Researchers Association: 1–2. Archived from the original (PDF) on November 27, 2010.
- John Alenander, The Kindest Man I've Ever Known
