= List of NFL career passing touchdowns leaders =

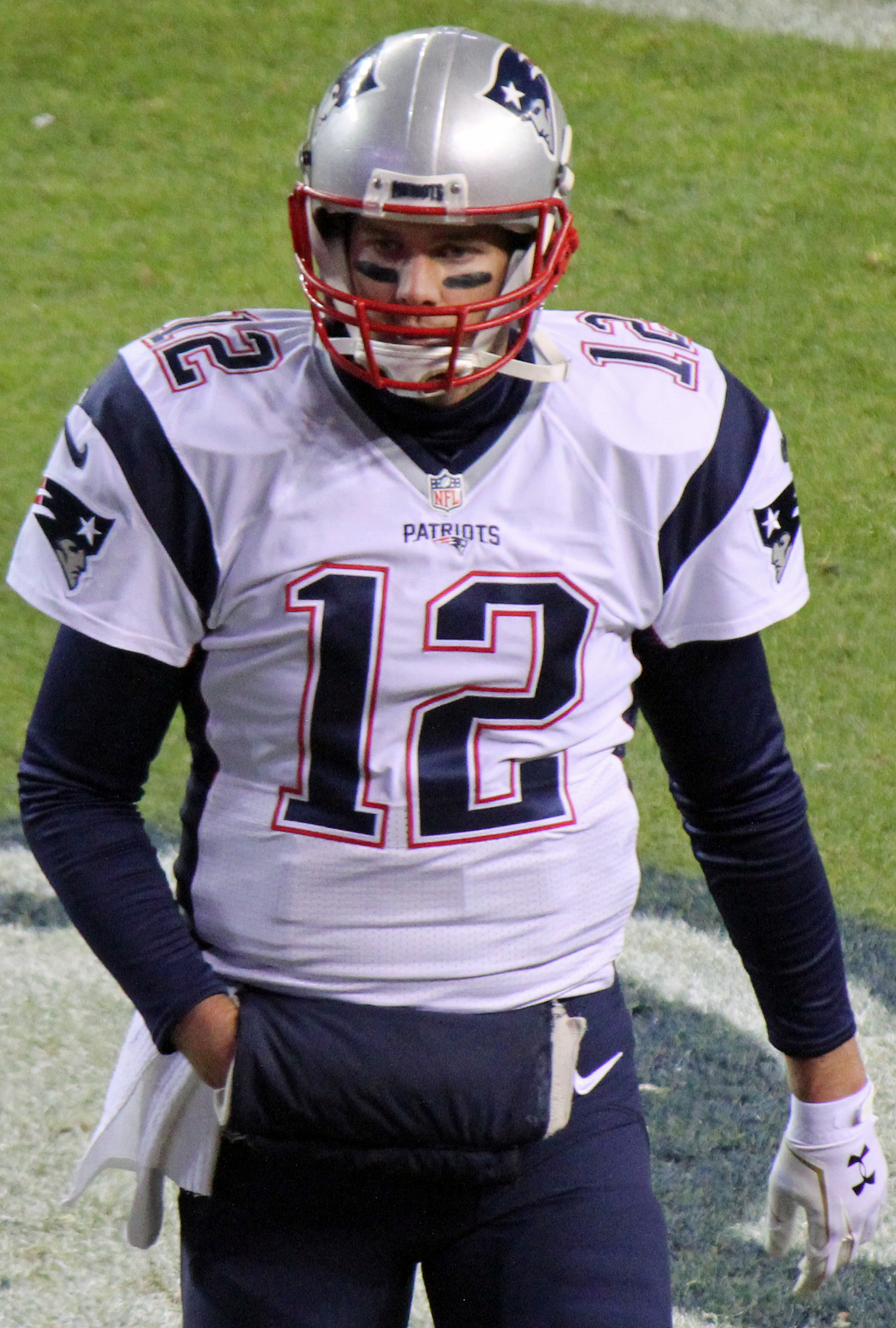
Tom Brady has 649 passing touchdowns, the most in NFL history.

In American football, passing, along with running (also referred to as rushing), is one of the two main methods of advancing the ball down the field. Passes are typically attempted by the quarterback, but any offensive player can throw one, provided they are behind the line of scrimmage. To qualify as a passing play, the ball must move forward upon leaving the passer's hands; if it moves laterally or backward, the play is considered a running play. A player catching a forward pass is called a receiver. A touchdown pass occurs when a pass results in a touchdown, either by being caught and advanced into the end zone or caught within its boundaries. The number of passing touchdowns a player makes is a recorded statistic in football games. In addition to the overall National Football League (NFL) passing touchdown leaders, league record books recognize the passing touchdown leaders of the American Football League, which operated from 1960 to 1969 before merging with the NFL in 1970. In 2025, the league announced that they would acknowledge records from the All-American Football Conference (AAFC), which operated from 1946 to 1949 before merging with the NFL in 1950.

Tom Brady holds the record for most passing touchdowns with 649, followed by Drew Brees with 571, Aaron Rodgers with 543 & Peyton Manning with 539. Rodgers leads all active players with that many career passing touchdowns. Brady is also the record holder for the most career playoff passing touchdowns with 88. He is followed by Patrick Mahomes with 46, and Joe Montana and Rodgers, tied for third at 45. Mahomes leads all active players in career playoff passing touchdowns. The longest career passing touchdown record holder is Fran Tarkenton, who held the record from 1975 to 1994.

== Regular season career passing touchdowns leaders ==
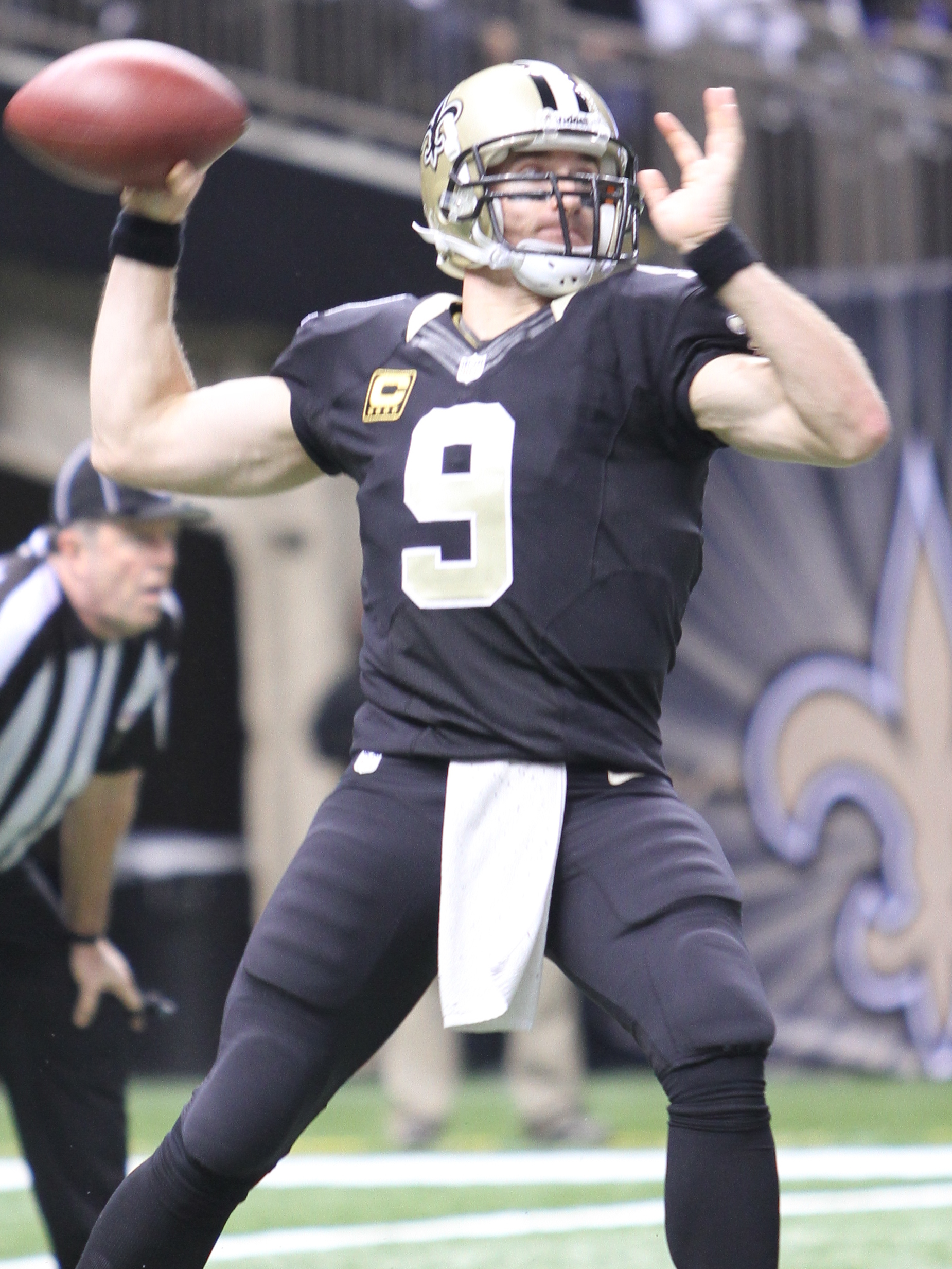
Drew Brees has the second most career passing touchdowns with 571.

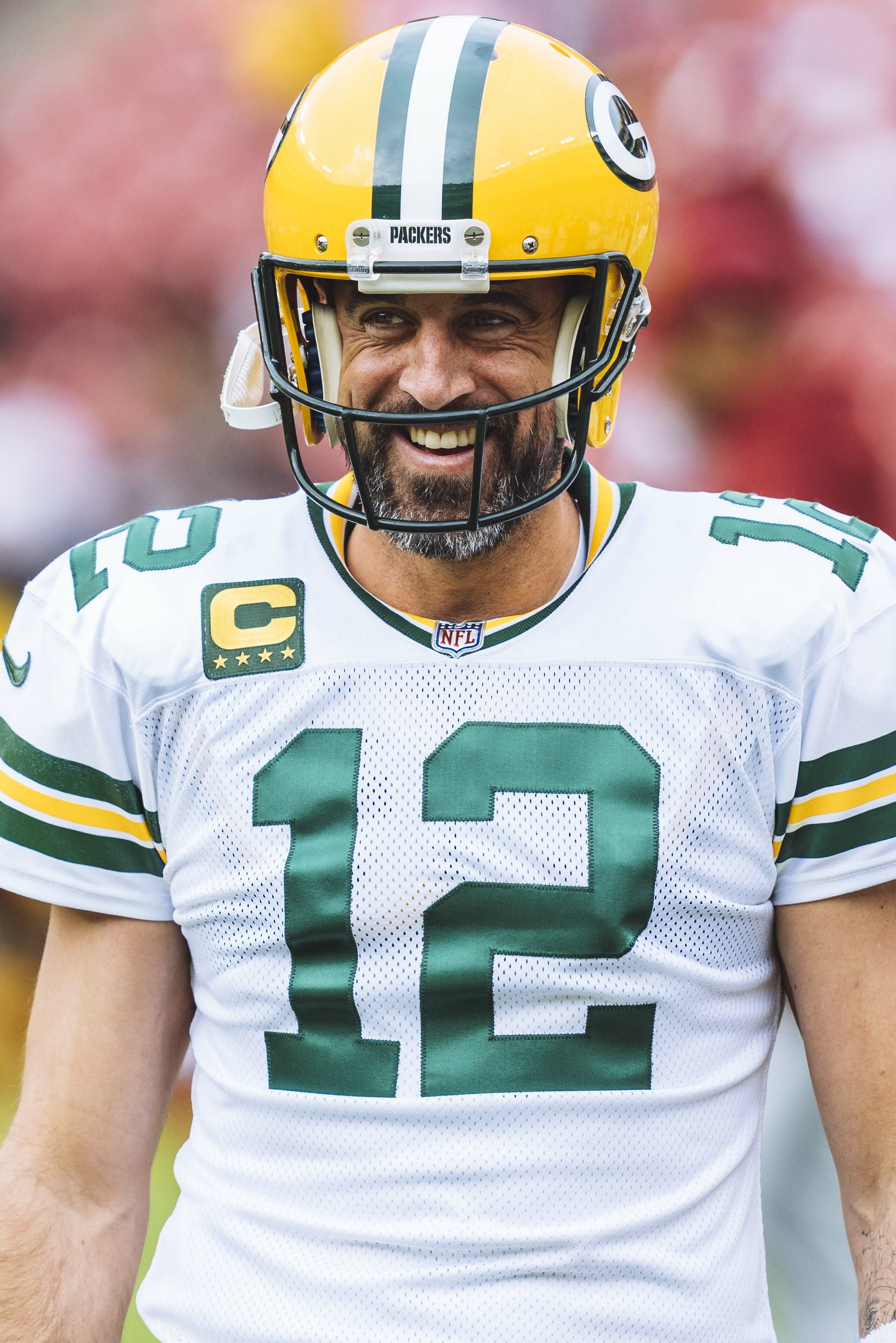
Aaron Rodgers, third with 543, is the leader in touchdown passes among active players.

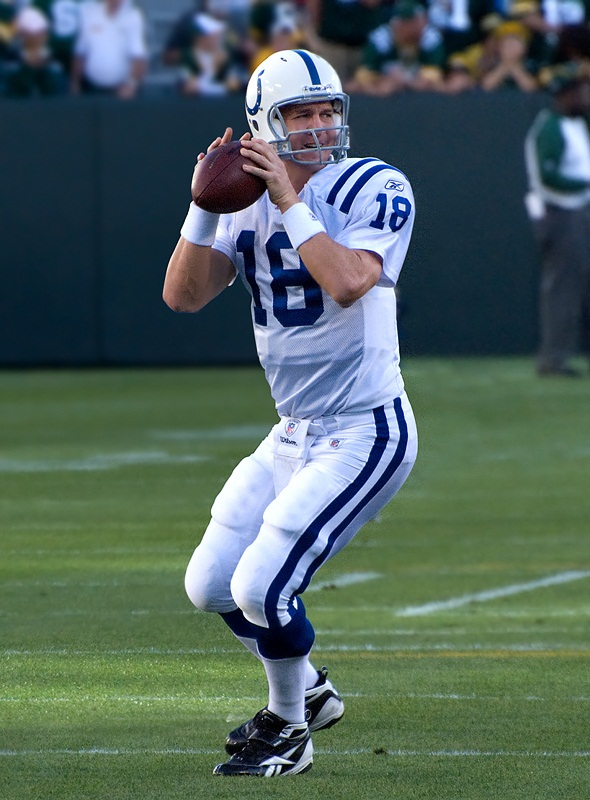
Peyton Manning's 539 career passing touchdowns ranks fourth in NFL history.

Legend
Symbol	Meaning
TDs	The total number of passing touchdowns the player had during their career
GP	The number of games played by a player during their career
†	Inducted into the Pro Football Hall of Fame
^	Active player

Through Week 11 earlier Sunday games of 2026 season. Top 50 are listed below.

NFL regular season career passing touchdown leaders
Rank	Player	TDs	GP	Team(s)	Seasons	Refs.
1	Tom Brady	649	335	New England Patriots	2000–2019	
1	Tom Brady	649	335	Tampa Bay Buccaneers	2020–2022	
2	Drew Brees†	571	287	San Diego Chargers	2001–2005	
2	Drew Brees†	571	287	New Orleans Saints	2006–2020	
3	Aaron Rodgers^{^}	543	274	Green Bay Packers	2005–2022	
3	Aaron Rodgers^{^}	543	274	New York Jets	2023–2024	
3	Aaron Rodgers^{^}	543	274	Pittsburgh Steelers	2025–present	
4	Peyton Manning†	539	266	Indianapolis Colts	1997–2011	
4	Peyton Manning†	539	266	Denver Broncos	2012–2015	
5	Brett Favre†	508	302	Atlanta Falcons	1991	
5	Brett Favre†	508	302	Green Bay Packers	1992–2007	
5	Brett Favre†	508	302	New York Jets	2008	
5	Brett Favre†	508	302	Minnesota Vikings	2009–2010	
6	Matthew Stafford^	442	249	Detroit Lions	2009–2020	
6	Matthew Stafford^	442	249	Los Angeles Rams	2021–present	
7	Philip Rivers	425	247	San Diego/Los Angeles Chargers	2004–2019	
7	Philip Rivers	425	247	Indianapolis Colts	2020, 2025	
8	Dan Marino†	420	242	Miami Dolphins	1983–1999	
9	Ben Roethlisberger	418	249	Pittsburgh Steelers	2004–2021	
10	Matt Ryan	381	234	Atlanta Falcons	2008–2021	
10	Matt Ryan	381	234	Indianapolis Colts	2022	
11	Eli Manning	366	236	New York Giants	2004–2019	
12	Russell Wilson	353	205	Seattle Seahawks	2012–2021	
12	Russell Wilson	353	205	Denver Broncos	2022–2023	
12	Russell Wilson	353	205	Pittsburgh Steelers	2024	
12	Russell Wilson	353	205	New York Giants	2025	
13	Fran Tarkenton†	342	246	Minnesota Vikings	1961–1966, 1972–1978	
13	Fran Tarkenton†	342	246	New York Giants	1967–1971	
14	Kirk Cousins^{^}	320	184	Washington Redskins	2012–2018	
14	Kirk Cousins^{^}	320	184	Minnesota Vikings	2018–2023, 2026–present	
14	Kirk Cousins^{^}	320	184	Atlanta Falcons	2024–2025	
14	Kirk Cousins^{^}	320	184	Las Vegas Raiders	2026	
15	John Elway†	300	234	Denver Broncos	1983–1998	
16	Carson Palmer	294	182	Cincinnati Bengals	2004–2010	
16	Carson Palmer	294	182	Oakland Raiders	2011–2012	
16	Carson Palmer	294	182	Arizona Cardinals	2013–2017	
17	Warren Moon†	291	208	Houston Oilers	1984–1993	
17	Warren Moon†	291	208	Minnesota Vikings	1994–1996	
17	Warren Moon†	291	208	Seattle Seahawks	1997–1998	
17	Warren Moon†	291	208	Kansas City Chiefs	1999–2000	
18	Johnny Unitas†	290	211	Baltimore Colts	1956–1972	
18	Johnny Unitas†	290	211	San Diego Chargers	1973	
19	Patrick Mahomes^	289	136	Kansas City Chiefs	2017–present	
20	Vinny Testaverde	275	233	Tampa Bay Buccaneers	1987–1992	
20	Vinny Testaverde	275	233	Cleveland Browns	1993–1995	
20	Vinny Testaverde	275	233	Baltimore Ravens	1996–1997	
20	Vinny Testaverde	275	233	New York Jets	1998–2003, 2005	
20	Vinny Testaverde	275	233	Dallas Cowboys	2004	
20	Vinny Testaverde	275	233	New England Patriots	2006	
20	Vinny Testaverde	275	233	Carolina Panthers	2007	
21	Jared Goff^	274	160	Los Angeles Rams	2016–2020	
21	Jared Goff^	274	160	Detroit Lions	2021–present	
22	Joe Montana†	273	192	San Francisco 49ers	1979–1992	
22	Joe Montana†	273	192	Kansas City Chiefs	1993–1994	
23	Joe Flacco^{^}	272	209	Baltimore Ravens	2008–2018	
23	Joe Flacco^{^}	272	209	Denver Broncos	2019	
23	Joe Flacco^{^}	272	209	New York Jets	2020, 2021–2022	
23	Joe Flacco^{^}	272	209	Philadelphia Eagles	2021	
23	Joe Flacco^{^}	272	209	Cleveland Browns	2023, 2025	
23	Joe Flacco^{^}	272	209	Indianapolis Colts	2024	
23	Joe Flacco^{^}	272	209	Cincinnati Bengals	2025–present	
24	Dak Prescott^{^}	268	160	Dallas Cowboys	2016–present	
25	Dave Krieg	261	213	Seattle Seahawks	1980–1991	
25	Dave Krieg	261	213	Kansas City Chiefs	1992–1993	
25	Dave Krieg	261	213	Detroit Lions	1994	
25	Dave Krieg	261	213	Arizona Cardinals	1995	
25	Dave Krieg	261	213	Chicago Bears	1996	
25	Dave Krieg	261	213	Tennessee Oilers	1997–1998	
26	Derek Carr	257	169	Oakland/Las Vegas Raiders	2014–2022	
26	Derek Carr	257	169	New Orleans Saints	2023–2024	
27	Sonny Jurgensen†	255	218	Philadelphia Eagles	1957–1963	
27	Sonny Jurgensen†	255	218	Washington Redskins	1964–1974	
28	Andy Dalton^{^}	254	179	Cincinnati Bengals	2011–2019	
28	Andy Dalton^{^}	254	179	Dallas Cowboys	2020	
28	Andy Dalton^{^}	254	179	Chicago Bears	2021	
28	Andy Dalton^{^}	254	179	New Orleans Saints	2022	
28	Andy Dalton^{^}	254	179	Carolina Panthers	2023–2025	
28	Andy Dalton^{^}	254	179	Philadelphia Eagles	2026	
28	Andy Dalton^{^}	254	179	Atlanta Falcons	2026–present	
28	Dan Fouts†	254	181	San Diego Chargers	1973–1987	
30	Drew Bledsoe	251	194	New England Patriots	1993–2001	
30	Drew Bledsoe	251	194	Buffalo Bills	2002–2004	
30	Drew Bledsoe	251	194	Dallas Cowboys	2005–2006	
31	Tony Romo	248	156	Dallas Cowboys	2004–2016	
32	Boomer Esiason	247	187	Cincinnati Bengals	1984–1992, 1997	
32	Boomer Esiason	247	187	New York Jets	1993–1995	
32	Boomer Esiason	247	187	Arizona Cardinals	1996	
33	John Hadl	244	224	San Diego Chargers	1962–1972	
33	John Hadl	244	224	Los Angeles Rams	1973–1974 (Note: John Hadl was traded during the 1974 season; he played six games for the Rams and eight for the Packers.)	
33	John Hadl	244	224	Green Bay Packers	1974–1975	
33	John Hadl	244	224	Houston Oilers	1976–1977	
34	Y. A. Tittle†	242	204	Baltimore Colts	1948—1950	
34	Y. A. Tittle†	242	204	San Francisco 49ers	1951–1960	
34	Y. A. Tittle†	242	204	New York Giants	1961–1964	
35	Len Dawson†	239	211	Pittsburgh Steelers	1957–1959	
35	Len Dawson†	239	211	Cleveland Browns	1960–1961	
35	Len Dawson†	239	211	Dallas Texans	1962	
35	Len Dawson†	239	211	Kansas City Chiefs	1963–1975	
36	Jim Kelly†	237	160	Buffalo Bills	1986–1996	
37	George Blanda†	236	340	Chicago Bears	1949, 1950–1958 (Note: George Blanda was traded during the 1950 season; he played one game for the Colts and eleven games for the Bears.)	
37	George Blanda†	236	340	Baltimore Colts	1950	
37	George Blanda†	236	340	Houston Oilers	1960–1966	
37	George Blanda†	236	340	Oakland Raiders	1967–1975	
38	Donovan McNabb	234	167	Philadelphia Eagles	1999–2009	
38	Donovan McNabb	234	167	Washington Redskins	2010	
38	Donovan McNabb	234	167	Minnesota Vikings	2011	
39	Josh Allen^{^}	233	137	Buffalo Bills	2018–present	
40	Steve Young†	232	169	Tampa Bay Buccaneers	1985–1986	
40	Steve Young†	232	169	San Francisco 49ers	1987–1999	
41	Jay Cutler	227	153	Denver Broncos	2006–2008	
41	Jay Cutler	227	153	Chicago Bears	2009–2016	
41	Jay Cutler	227	153	Miami Dolphins	2017	
42	Ryan Fitzpatrick	223	166	St. Louis Rams	2005–2006	
42	Ryan Fitzpatrick	223	166	Cincinnati Bengals	2007–2008	
42	Ryan Fitzpatrick	223	166	Buffalo Bills	2009–2012	
42	Ryan Fitzpatrick	223	166	Tennessee Titans	2013	
42	Ryan Fitzpatrick	223	166	Houston Texans	2014	
42	Ryan Fitzpatrick	223	166	New York Jets	2015–2016	
42	Ryan Fitzpatrick	223	166	Tampa Bay Buccaneers	2017–2018	
42	Ryan Fitzpatrick	223	166	Miami Dolphins	2019–2020	
42	Ryan Fitzpatrick	223	166	Washington Football Team	2021	
43	Ryan Tannehill	216	155	Miami Dolphins	2012–2018	
43	Ryan Tannehill	216	155	Tennessee Titans	2019–2023	
44	John Brodie	214	201	San Francisco 49ers	1957–1973	
45	Terry Bradshaw†	212	168	Pittsburgh Steelers	1970–1983	
45	Matt Hasselbeck	212	209	Green Bay Packers	1999–2000	
45	Matt Hasselbeck	212	209	Seattle Seahawks	2001–2010	
45	Matt Hasselbeck	212	209	Tennessee Titans	2011–2012	
45	Matt Hasselbeck	212	209	Indianapolis Colts	2013–2015	
47	Jim Hart	209	201	St. Louis Cardinals	1966–1983	
47	Jim Hart	209	201	Washington Redskins	1984	
48	Kerry Collins	208	198	Carolina Panthers	1995–1998 (Note: Kerry Collins was traded during the 1998 season; he played four games for the Panthers and seven for the Saints.)	
48	Kerry Collins	208	198	New Orleans Saints	1998	
48	Kerry Collins	208	198	New York Giants	1999–2003	
48	Kerry Collins	208	198	Oakland Raiders	2004–2005	
48	Kerry Collins	208	198	Tennessee Titans	2006–2010	
48	Kerry Collins	208	198	Indianapolis Colts	2011	
48	Kurt Warner†	208	124	St. Louis Rams`	1998–2003	
48	Kurt Warner†	208	124	New York Giants	2004	
48	Kurt Warner†	208	124	Arizona Cardinals	2005–2009	
50	Randall Cunningham	207	161	Philadelphia Eagles	1985–1995	
50	Randall Cunningham	207	161	Minnesota Vikings	1997–1999	
50	Randall Cunningham	207	161	Dallas Cowboys	2000	
50	Randall Cunningham	207	161	Baltimore Ravens	2001	

== Playoff career passing touchdowns leaders ==
Based on at least 18 TD passes.

NFL playoff career passing touchdown leaders
Legend	Meaning
TDs	The total number of passing touchdowns the player had during their playoff career
GP	The number of games played by a player during their playoff career
†	Inducted into the Pro Football Hall of Fame
^	Active player

Updated through end of 2025–26 NFL playoffs.

Rank	Player	TDs	GP	Team(s)	Seasons	Refs.
1	Tom Brady	88	48	New England Patriots	2000–2019	
1	Tom Brady	88	48	Tampa Bay Buccaneers	2020–2022	
2	Patrick Mahomes^	46	21	Kansas City Chiefs	2017–present	
3	Joe Montana†	45	23	San Francisco 49ers	1979–1992	
3	Joe Montana†	45	23	Kansas City Chiefs	1993–1994	
3	Aaron Rodgers^{^}	45	23	Green Bay Packers	2005–2022	
3	Aaron Rodgers^{^}	45	23	New York Jets	2023–2024	
3	Aaron Rodgers^{^}	45	23	Pittsburgh Steelers	2025–present	
5	Brett Favre†	44	24	Atlanta Falcons	1991	
5	Brett Favre†	44	24	Green Bay Packers	1992–2007	
5	Brett Favre†	44	24	New York Jets	2008	
5	Brett Favre†	44	24	Minnesota Vikings	2009–2010	
6	Peyton Manning†	40	27	Indianapolis Colts	1998–2011	
6	Peyton Manning†	40	27	Denver Broncos	2012–2015	
7	Drew Brees†	37	18	San Diego Chargers	2001–2005	
7	Drew Brees†	37	18	New Orleans Saints	2006–2020	
8	Ben Roethlisberger	36	23	Pittsburgh Steelers	2004–2021	
9	Dan Marino†	32	18	Miami Dolphins	1983–1999	
10	Kurt Warner†	31	13	St. Louis Rams	1998–2003	
10	Kurt Warner†	31	13	New York Giants	2004	
10	Kurt Warner†	31	13	Arizona Cardinals	2005–2009	
11	Terry Bradshaw†	30	19	Pittsburgh Steelers	1970–1983	
12	Josh Allen^	29	15	Buffalo Bills	2018–present	
13	John Elway†	27	22	Denver Broncos	1983–1998	
13	Russell Wilson	27	17	Seattle Seahawks	2012–2021	
13	Russell Wilson	27	17	Denver Broncos	2022–2023	
13	Russell Wilson	27	17	Pittsburgh Steelers	2024	
13	Russell Wilson	27	17	New York Giants	2025	
15	Joe Flacco^	26	16	Baltimore Ravens	2008–2018	
15	Joe Flacco^	26	16	Denver Broncos	2019	
15	Joe Flacco^	26	16	New York Jets	2020, 2021–2022	
15	Joe Flacco^	26	16	Philadelphia Eagles	2021	
15	Joe Flacco^	26	16	Cleveland Browns	2023, 2025	
15	Joe Flacco^	26	16	Indianapolis Colts	2024	
15	Joe Flacco^	26	16	Cincinnati Bengals	2025–present	
16	Matthew Stafford^	25	13	Detroit Lions	2009–2020	
16	Matthew Stafford^	25	13	Los Angeles Rams	2021–present	
17	Donovan McNabb	24	16	Philadelphia Eagles	1999–2009	
17	Donovan McNabb	24	16	Washington Redskins	2010	
17	Donovan McNabb	24	16	Minnesota Vikings	2011	
17	Roger Staubach	24	20	Dallas Cowboys	1969–1979	
19	Troy Aikman	23	16	Dallas Cowboys	1989–2000	
20	Jim Kelly†	21	17	Buffalo Bills	1986–1996	
21	Matt Ryan	20	10	Atlanta Falcons	2008–2021	
21	Matt Ryan	20	10	Indianapolis Colts	2022	
21	Steve Young†	20	22	Tampa Bay Buccaneers	1985–1986	
21	Steve Young†	20	22	San Francisco 49ers	1987–1997	
23	Daryle Lamonica	19	13	Buffalo Bills	1963–1966	
23	Daryle Lamonica	19	13	Oakland Raiders	1967–1974	
23	Ken Stabler†	19	13	Oakland Raiders	1970–1979	
23	Ken Stabler†	19	13	Houston Oilers	1980–1981	
23	Ken Stabler†	19	13	New Orleans Saints	1982–1984	
25	Matt Hasselbeck	18	11	Green Bay Packers	1999–2000	
25	Matt Hasselbeck	18	11	Seattle Seahawks	2001–2010	
25	Matt Hasselbeck	18	11	Tennessee Titans	2011–2012	
25	Matt Hasselbeck	18	11	Indianapolis Colts	2013–2015	
25	Eli Manning	18	12	New York Giants	2004–2019	

== Historical career passing touchdowns leaders ==
Sixteen players are recognized as having held outright or tied the record as the NFL's career passing touchdowns leader.

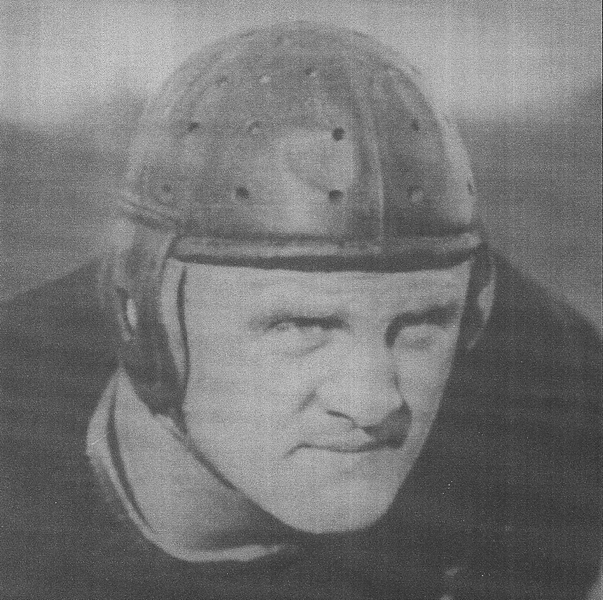
Elmer Oliphant, the first record holder

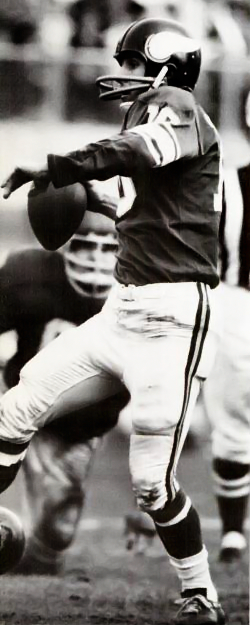
Fran Tarkenton held the record for 19 years, currently the longest period of time the record has been held by any quarterback in history.

NFL historical career passing touchdown leaders
No.	Reign	Player	Team(s) while leader	TDs	Season(s)	Ref.
1	1921–1922	Elmer Oliphant	Buffalo All-Americans	7	1921–1922	
2	1923	Lou Smyth	Canton Bulldogs	8	1923	
3	1924–1928	Curly Lambeau†	Green Bay Packers	14	1924	
3	1924–1928	Curly Lambeau†	Green Bay Packers	19	1925	
3	1924–1928	Curly Lambeau†	Green Bay Packers	22	1926	
3	1924–1928	Curly Lambeau†	Green Bay Packers	23	1927	
3	1924–1928	Curly Lambeau†	Green Bay Packers	24	1928	
4	Tied 1928	Red Dunn	Green Bay Packers	24	1928	
5	1929–1942	Benny Friedman†	New York Giants (1929–1931); Brooklyn Dodgers (1932–1934)	40	1929	
5	1929–1942	Benny Friedman†	New York Giants (1929–1931); Brooklyn Dodgers (1932–1934)	53	1930	
5	1929–1942	Benny Friedman†	New York Giants (1929–1931); Brooklyn Dodgers (1932–1934)	56	1931	
5	1929–1942	Benny Friedman†	New York Giants (1929–1931); Brooklyn Dodgers (1932–1934)	61	1932	
5	1929–1942	Benny Friedman†	New York Giants (1929–1931); Brooklyn Dodgers (1932–1934)	66	1933–1942	
6	Tied 1940–1942	Arnie Herber†	Green Bay Packers	66	1940–1942	
7	1943–1961	Sammy Baugh†	Washington Redskins	80	1943	
7	1943–1961	Sammy Baugh†	Washington Redskins	84	1944	
7	1943–1961	Sammy Baugh†	Washington Redskins	95	1945	
7	1943–1961	Sammy Baugh†	Washington Redskins	103	1946	
7	1943–1961	Sammy Baugh†	Washington Redskins	128	1947	
7	1943–1961	Sammy Baugh†	Washington Redskins	150	1948	
7	1943–1961	Sammy Baugh†	Washington Redskins	168	1949	
7	1943–1961	Sammy Baugh†	Washington Redskins	178	1950	
7	1943–1961	Sammy Baugh†	Washington Redskins	185	1951	
7	1943–1961	Sammy Baugh†	Washington Redskins	187	1952–1961	
8	Tied 1961	Bobby Layne†	Pittsburgh Steelers	187	1961	
8	1962	Bobby Layne†	Pittsburgh Steelers	196	1962	
9	1963–1965	Y.A. Tittle†	New York Giants			
9	1963–1965	Y.A. Tittle†	New York Giants	202	1963	
9	1963–1965	Y.A. Tittle†	New York Giants	212	1964–1965	
10	1966–1974	Johnny Unitas†	Baltimore Colts (1967–1972); San Diego Chargers (1973)	232	1966	
10	1966–1974	Johnny Unitas†	Baltimore Colts (1967–1972); San Diego Chargers (1973)	252	1967	
10	1966–1974	Johnny Unitas†	Baltimore Colts (1967–1972); San Diego Chargers (1973)	254	1968	
10	1966–1974	Johnny Unitas†	Baltimore Colts (1967–1972); San Diego Chargers (1973)	266	1969	
10	1966–1974	Johnny Unitas†	Baltimore Colts (1967–1972); San Diego Chargers (1973)	280	1970	
10	1966–1974	Johnny Unitas†	Baltimore Colts (1967–1972); San Diego Chargers (1973)	283	1971	
10	1966–1974	Johnny Unitas†	Baltimore Colts (1967–1972); San Diego Chargers (1973)	287	1972	
10	1966–1974	Johnny Unitas†	Baltimore Colts (1967–1972); San Diego Chargers (1973)	290	1973–1974	
11	1975–1994	Fran Tarkenton†	Minnesota Vikings	291	1975	
11	1975–1994	Fran Tarkenton†	Minnesota Vikings	308	1976	
11	1975–1994	Fran Tarkenton†	Minnesota Vikings	317	1977	
11	1975–1994	Fran Tarkenton†	Minnesota Vikings	342	1978–1994	
12	1995–2006	Dan Marino†	Miami Dolphins	352	1995	
12	1995–2006	Dan Marino†	Miami Dolphins	369	1996	
12	1995–2006	Dan Marino†	Miami Dolphins	385	1997	
12	1995–2006	Dan Marino†	Miami Dolphins	408	1998	
12	1995–2006	Dan Marino†	Miami Dolphins	420	1999–2006	
13	2007–2013	Brett Favre†	Green Bay Packers (2007); New York Jets (2008); Minnesota Vikings (2009–2010)	442	2007	
13	2007–2013	Brett Favre†	Green Bay Packers (2007); New York Jets (2008); Minnesota Vikings (2009–2010)	464	2008	
13	2007–2013	Brett Favre†	Green Bay Packers (2007); New York Jets (2008); Minnesota Vikings (2009–2010)	497	2009	
13	2007–2013	Brett Favre†	Green Bay Packers (2007); New York Jets (2008); Minnesota Vikings (2009–2010)	508	2010–2013	
14	2014–2018	Peyton Manning †	Denver Broncos	530	2014	
14	2014–2018	Peyton Manning †	Denver Broncos	539	2015–2018	
15	2019	Drew Brees †	New Orleans Saints	547	2019	
16	Since 2020 (6 years)	Tom Brady	Tampa Bay Buccaneers	581	2020	
16	Since 2020 (6 years)	Tom Brady	Tampa Bay Buccaneers	624	2021	
16	Since 2020 (6 years)	Tom Brady	Tampa Bay Buccaneers	649	2022–present	

== See also ==
- List of NFL annual passing touchdowns leaders
