= Harrisburg Technical High School =

- U.S. National Register of Historic Places
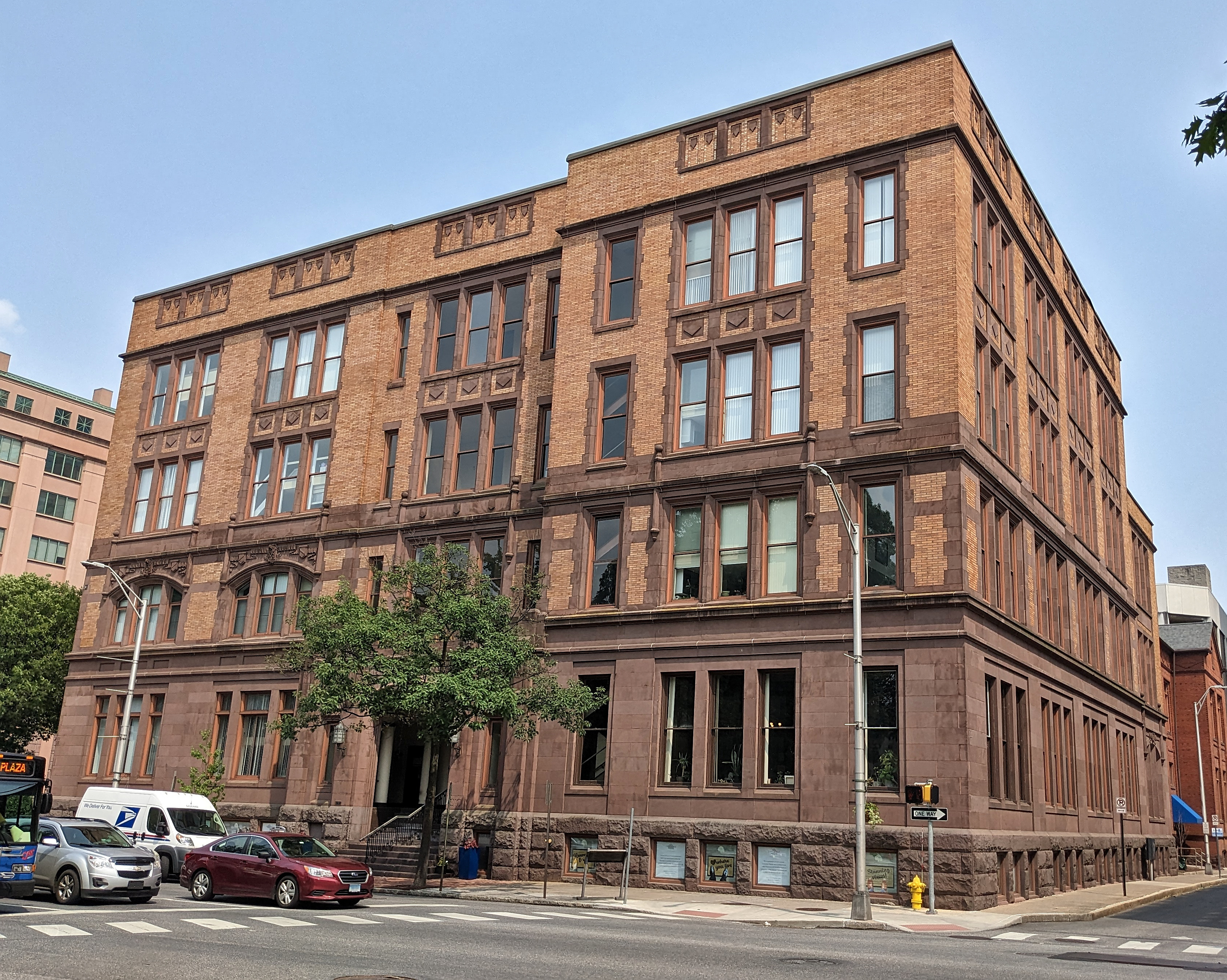
- Harrisburg Technical High School, June 2023

- Location within Pennsylvania Location within the United States
- Location: 423 Walnut St., Harrisburg, Pennsylvania
- Coordinates: 40°15′48″N 76°52′49″W
- Area: 1.1 acres (0.45 ha)
- Built: 1905, 1910
- Architect: Charles Lloyd
- Architectural style: Collegiate Gothic
- NRHP reference No.: 82001533
- Added to NRHP: December 7, 1982

Harrisburg Technical High School, also known as Old City Hall, is a historic building and former high school located in Harrisburg, Dauphin County, Pennsylvania. Though previously used as a high school, vocational school, and municipal building, it is now converted for apartments. It was added to the National Register of Historic Places in 1982.

== History ==
As Harrisburg's manufacturing and industry was prosperous in the turn of the 20th century, the Harrisburg Board of School Directors took a look at "manual training programs" in Philadelphia and Washington, D.C. in 1904. The next year, Superintendent Lemuel O. Foose decided to implement a program by building a rear expansion to what was then The Harrisburg Lancasterian School (renamed DeWitt School) built in 1836, on the site of the current day Technical High School. The 1905 DeWitt School Building Shop expansion was a two-story, brick and iron frame structure, which was designed to hold heavy machinery for the curriculum. As this program became quickly successful, the DeWitt School's front structure became obsolete. The front portion was razed and rebuilt in 1910, designed by prominent Harrisburg architect Charles Howard Lloyd and constructed as a four-story, steel frame and concrete Collegiate Gothic style building and renamed Harrisburg Technical High School, along with the previous 1905 rear shop expansion. It sits on a brownstone foundation, some of which was mined in Hummelstown, Pennsylvania. The front façade features tapestry, brick veneer and brownstone trim. By 1921, Lloyd drafted another expansion, but the city instead later opted on building two new schools, William Penn High School and John Harris High School, to facilitate the large student population growth. Following the two new schools, the building was sold to the city after its closure in 1926. Also designed by Charles Lloyd, the building was then converted for use as Harrisburg's City Hall in 1929. In the 1980s, after the relocation of City Hall, the building began yet another new purpose as apartment housing.

== Football ==
In the 1918 and 1919 football seasons, Paul G. Smith coached the Tech Maroons to 21 undefeated wins with star player Carl Beck. The championship was won again in 1925 with Johnny Kitzmiller scoring 21 points.

== Notable alumni ==
- Jacques Barzun
- Carl Beck
- Jimmie DeShong
- Glenn Killinger
- Johnny Kitzmiller
- Marlin Skiles, musician
- Clarence G. Stoner (1901–1994), member of the Pennsylvania House of Delegates
