= Shag Sheard =

American football player and coach (1898–1980)

Profile
- Positions: Halfback, quarterback

Personal information
- Born: November 17, 1898; Canton, New York, U.S.
- Died: November 11, 1980 (aged 81); Canton, New York, U.S.
- Listed height: 5 ft 11 in (1.80 m)
- Listed weight: 177 lb (80 kg)

Career information
- High school: Canton (NY)
- College: St. Lawrence

Career history
- Rochester Jeffersons (1923–1925); Rochester Oxfords (1926–1931); Rochester Russers (1932–1933)

Alfred Scotchard "Shag" Sheard (November 17, 1898 – November 11, 1980) was an American football player and coach.

== Early life ==
Sheard was born in 1898 in Canton, New York. He attended Canton High School and St. Lawrence University, also located in Canton. He played college football for the St. Lawrence Saints football team in 1919 and 1920. As a freshman in 1919, he established himself as the team's star quarterback with his long runs (including a 60-yard touchdown run against the University of Rochester), dashes around the ends, forward passes, long punts, and tackling. As a sophomore in 1920, he moved to the left halfback position where he continued to excel as a triple-threat man. Sheard's college career ended after his sophomore season when a University of Rochester coach recognized Sheard playing professional football for the 1922 Frankford Yellow Jackets.

== Professional football ==
In October 1921, Sheard reportedly joined the Rochester Jeffersons of the National Football League (NFL), but no statistical information is recorded regarding his role on the 1921 team. According to available records, Sheard played three seasons from 1923 to 1925 at left halfback and quarterback for Jeffersons. He appeared in 18 NFL games, all of them as a starter. He continued to be a versatile contributor. In 1924, the Rochester Democrat and Chronicle reported: "Sheard ran back punts as only Sheard can, and had his teammates on the receiving end of several of his passes handled the ball cleanly."

The Jeffersons disbanded after the 1925 season. In 1926, Sheard joined the Rochester Oxfords football team as both player and coach. He was the Oxfords' coach and "triple threat" star from 1926 to 1931.

In 1932, he left the Oxfords and became coach of the rival Rochester Russers. He continued as coach of the Russers in 1933. After leading the Oxfords to multiple Western New York football championships, he did the same for the Russers.

== Later life ==
Sheard later served as the head football coach at his alma mater, St. Lawrence, for one season, in 1942.
