= Simon Cameron School =

- U.S. National Register of Historic Places
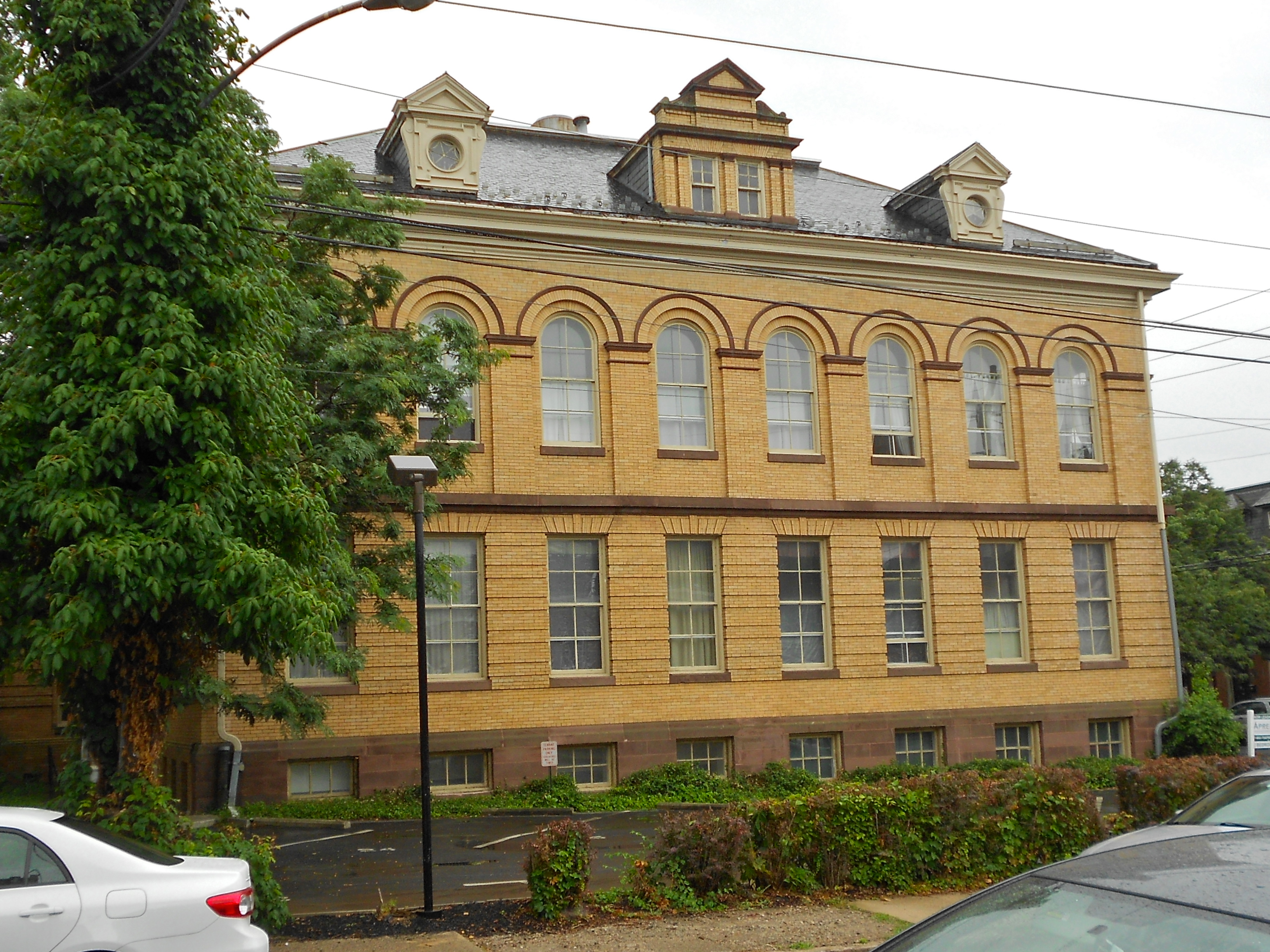
- Simon Cameron School, August 2013

- Location within Pennsylvania Location within the United States
- Location: 1839 Green St., Harrisburg, Pennsylvania
- Coordinates: 40°16′32″N 76°53′41″W
- Area: 0.8 acres (0.32 ha)
- Built: 1896, 1900
- Architect: Charles Howard Lloyd; Charles James Foose
- Architectural style: Late 19th and 20th Century Revivals, Second Renaissance Revival
- NRHP reference No.: 86000855
- Added to NRHP: April 24, 1986

The Simon Cameron School is an historic school building in Harrisburg, Dauphin County, Pennsylvania, United States.

Named for Pennsylvania politician Simon Cameron (1799–1889), it was added to the National Register of Historic Places in 1986.

== History and architectural features ==
Designed by Charles Howard Lloyd and partner Charles James Foose, the Simon Cameron School was built in 1896 and named for Pennsylvania politician Simon Cameron (1799–1889).

Its Second Renaissance Revival style includes a two-story brick and frame building with a hip roof that is covered in slate shingles. It sits on a brownstone foundation, and is twelve bays wide and eight bays deep, with an eight-bay wide, six-bay deep rear section that was added in 1904.

It was added to the National Register of Historic Places in 1986.
