= Ivor D. Fenton =

American politician (1889–1986)

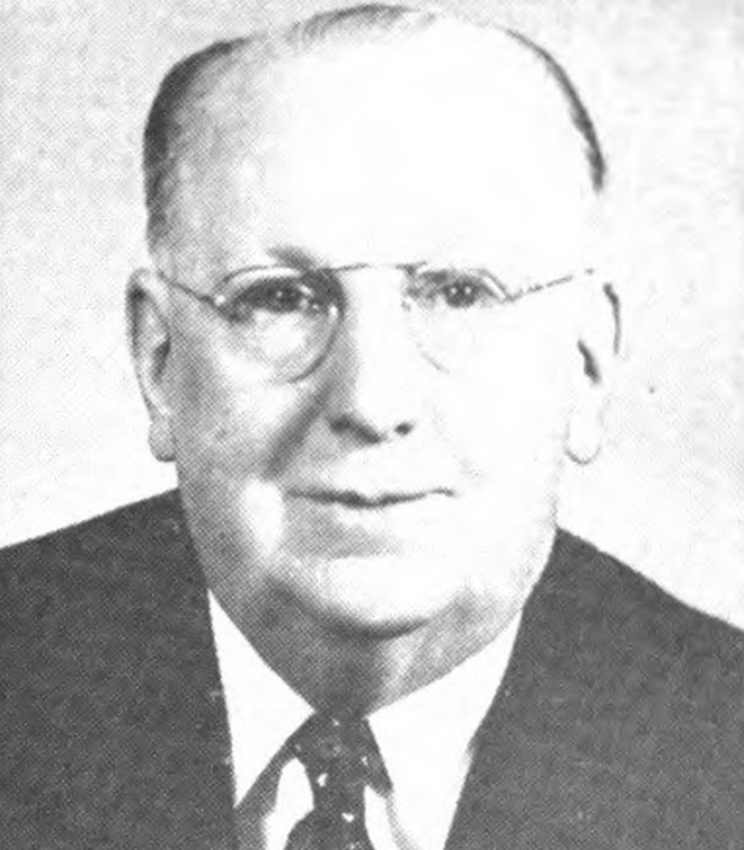

Member of the U.S. House of Representatives from Pennsylvania
- In office January 3, 1939 – January 3, 1963
- Preceded by: James H. Gildea
- Succeeded by: George M. Rhodes (redistricting)
- Constituency: 13th district (1939–1945); 12th district (1945–1963)

Personal details
- Born: August 3, 1889 Mahanoy City, Pennsylvania, U.S.
- Died: October 23, 1986 (aged 97) Sunbury, Pennsylvania, U.S.
- Education: Bucknell College, Jefferson Medical College
- Profession: Physician

Ivor David Fenton (August 3, 1889 – October 23, 1986) was a Republican member of the U.S. House of Representatives from Pennsylvania.

== Early life ==
Ivor Fenton was born in Mahanoy City (Buck Mountain), Pennsylvania. He attended Bucknell University in Lewisburg, Pennsylvania, and graduated from Jefferson Medical College in Philadelphia, Pennsylvania, in 1912. He served an internship at Ashland State Hospital in Pennsylvania in 1912 and 1913, and then commenced the practice of medicine in Mahanoy City.

== Military service ==
He enlisted in the United States Army Medical Corps and was commissioned a lieutenant on August 8, 1917, rising later to the rank of captain. He served twenty months (eleven overseas) with the 315th Infantry, 79th Infantry Division. After his military service he returned to Mahanoy City to resume his medical practice.

He was awarded the Silver Star and World War I Victory Medal with two bronze battle clasps. He was a battalion surgeon for the 315th Regiment of the 79th Infantry Division in France during his 11-month tour with the American Expeditionary Forces.

== Public service ==
Fenton was elected as a Republican to the 76th United States Congress and to the eleven succeeding Congresses. Fenton voted in favor of the Civil Rights Acts of 1957 and 1960, as well as the 24th Amendment to the U.S. Constitution. He was an unsuccessful candidate for reelection in 1962 after re-districting forced him into an election against fellow incumbent George Rhodes.

After his time in Congress, he served as medical advisor to Secretary of Welfare of the State of Pennsylvania and as a medical consultant to State General Hospital, State of Pennsylvania. He retired in January 1968, and lived in Mahonoy City until his death in Sunbury, Pennsylvania.

U.S. House of Representatives
Preceded by James H. Gildea	Member of the U.S. House of Representatives from Pennsylvania's 13th congressional district 1939–1945	Succeeded by Daniel K. Hoch
Preceded by Thomas B. Miller	Member of the U.S. House of Representatives from Pennsylvania's 12th congressional district 1945–1963	Succeeded by J. Irving Whalley
