= Telegraph Building (Harrisburg, Pennsylvania) =

United States national historic site

- Formerly listed on the U.S. National Register of Historic Places
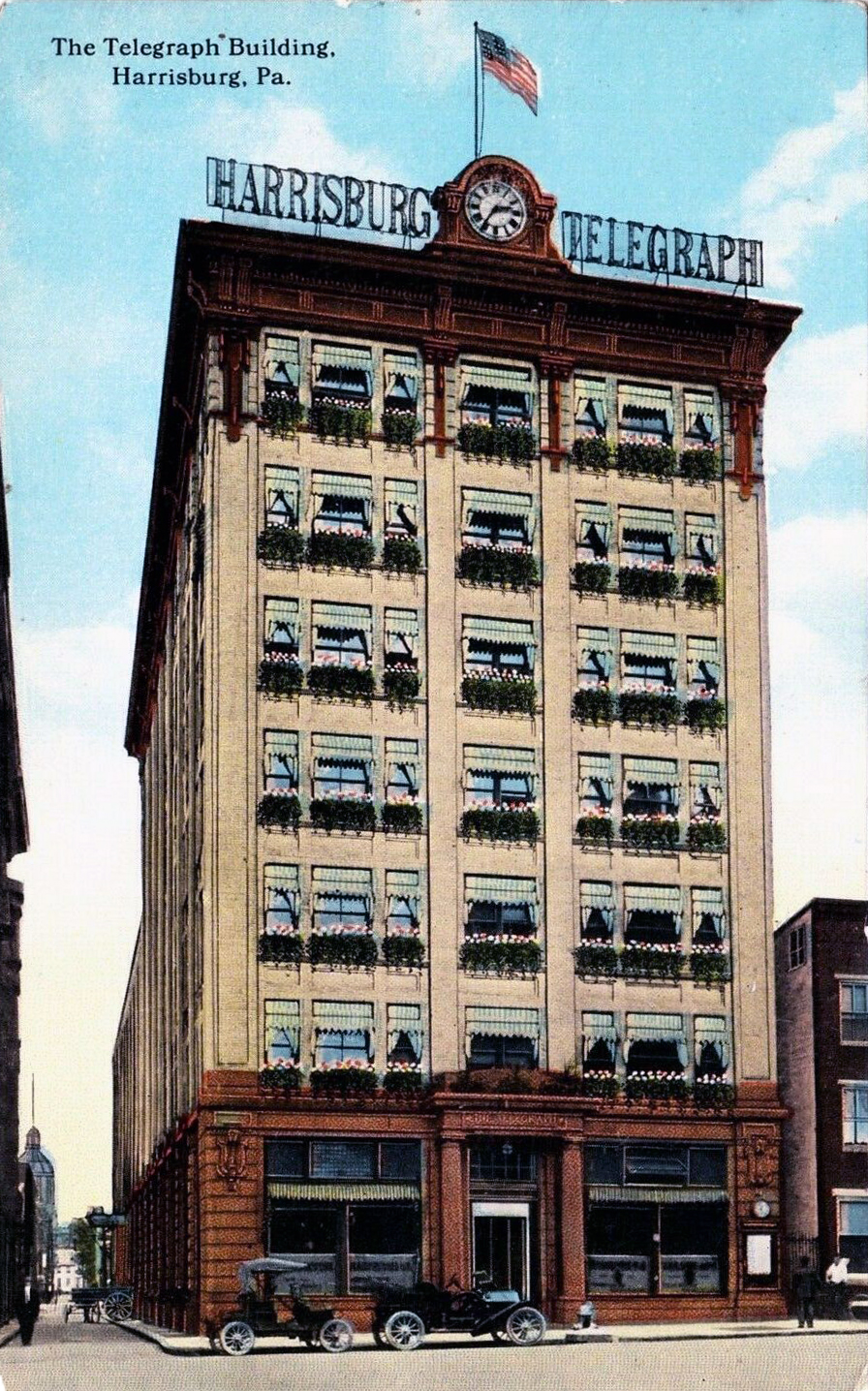
- The former Harrisburg Telegraph Building as illustrated on a 1910 postcard
- Location: 214-216 Locust St., Harrisburg, Pennsylvania, U.S.
- Area: 0.3 acres (0.12 ha)
- Built: 1909-1910
- Architect: Charles Howard Lloyd; Coder & Miller
- Architectural style: Chicago, Italianate
- NRHP reference No.: 78002387

Significant dates
- Added to NRHP: March 3, 1978
- Removed from NRHP: June 27, 1986

The Telegraph Building was an historic commercial building located in Harrisburg, Pennsylvania, United States. It was the headquarters of the Harrisburg Telegraph, a Republican evening newspaper that was established during the 1800s. The building was demolished in 1978.

== History and architectural features ==
Built between 1909 and 1910 during the City Beautiful movement, this historic structure was designed in the Italianate style by prominent Harrisburg architect Charles Howard Lloyd. Reminiscent of the Chicago school-era of early skyscrapers, Lloyd's design was heavily influenced by the work of architect Daniel H. Burnham.

Structurally, the building consisted of front and back sections. The front, which housed the offices of the Harrisburg newspaper that gave the building its name, was a seven-story steel frame structure with light brick walls and concrete floors that were covered with hardwood. Its interior featured a central terrazo-floored hall, which ended at the north wall and separated the sections. It was here that the elevators, stairwell, and public restrooms were located. The building also had an innovative central vacuuming system. Its electrical fixtures were supplied and installed by the Dauphin Electrical Supplies Company.

The rear section was a darker, red-brick, five-story structure with wood-paneled floors and latticed steel columns. It featured large open spaces with wooden trusses that supported the roof and offered access to a freight elevator.

The building site had previously been home to the Shakespeare Hall, an 1822 structure that had been designed by John Wyeth and used by the Harrisburg Telegraph's staff. By 1909, rising circulation required construction of a new building."

The Telegraph Building formally opened to the public during an open house on April 28, 1910. A five-foot, five hundred-pound Seth Thomas Clock on the roof illuminated the newspaper's name, "Harrisburg Telegraph." The newspaper's publishers also purchased a new, twenty-passenger Pullman Sight-Seeing Car that they dubbed the "'Seeing Harrisburg' Car," offering trips from the new Telegraph Building to historic points of interest and entertainment venues throughout the city.

News editors and reporters occupied the publication's new building from its opening until 1948, when it was sold to The Patriot-News. Charles Howard Lloyd also used the building as the site for his offices.

== Later years ==
The Telegraph Building was added to the National Register of Historic Places in 1978, and was also included in the Old Downtown Harrisburg Commercial Historic District. Five months later, the building was razed to create a parking lot for the neighboring Locust Court Building. In 1986, it was delisted from the National Register of Historic Places.
