= Clarence Stoner =

American politician (1901–1994)

Member of the Pennsylvania House of Representatives from the Cumberland County district
- In office 1951–1960

Personal details
- Born: Clarence G. Stoner; June 25, 1901 New Kingston, Cumberland County, Pennsylvania, U.S.
- Died: April 9, 1994 (aged 92) Camp Hill, Pennsylvania, U.S.
- Resting place: Saint Johns Cemetery; Shiremanstown, Pennsylvania, U.S.
- Party: Republican
- Spouse: Blanche V. Fisher (died)
- Children: 1
- Occupation: Politician; businessman

Clarence G. Stoner (June 25, 1901 – April 9, 1994) was an American politician and businessman from Pennsylvania. He served in the Pennsylvania House of Representatives from 1951 to 1960.

== Early life ==
Clarence G. Stoner was born on June 25, 1901, in New Kingston, Cumberland County, Pennsylvania. He graduated from Harrisburg Technical High School.

== Career ==
Stoner founded Stoner Beverage Company of Harrisburg. He was a board member of Commonwealth National Bank and Shiremanstown National Bank. He was president of the Keystone Bottlers Association.

Stoner was elected council president of Shiremanstown. He was elected as a Republican to the Pennsylvania House of Representatives, representing Cumberland County from 1951 to 1960.

== Personal life ==
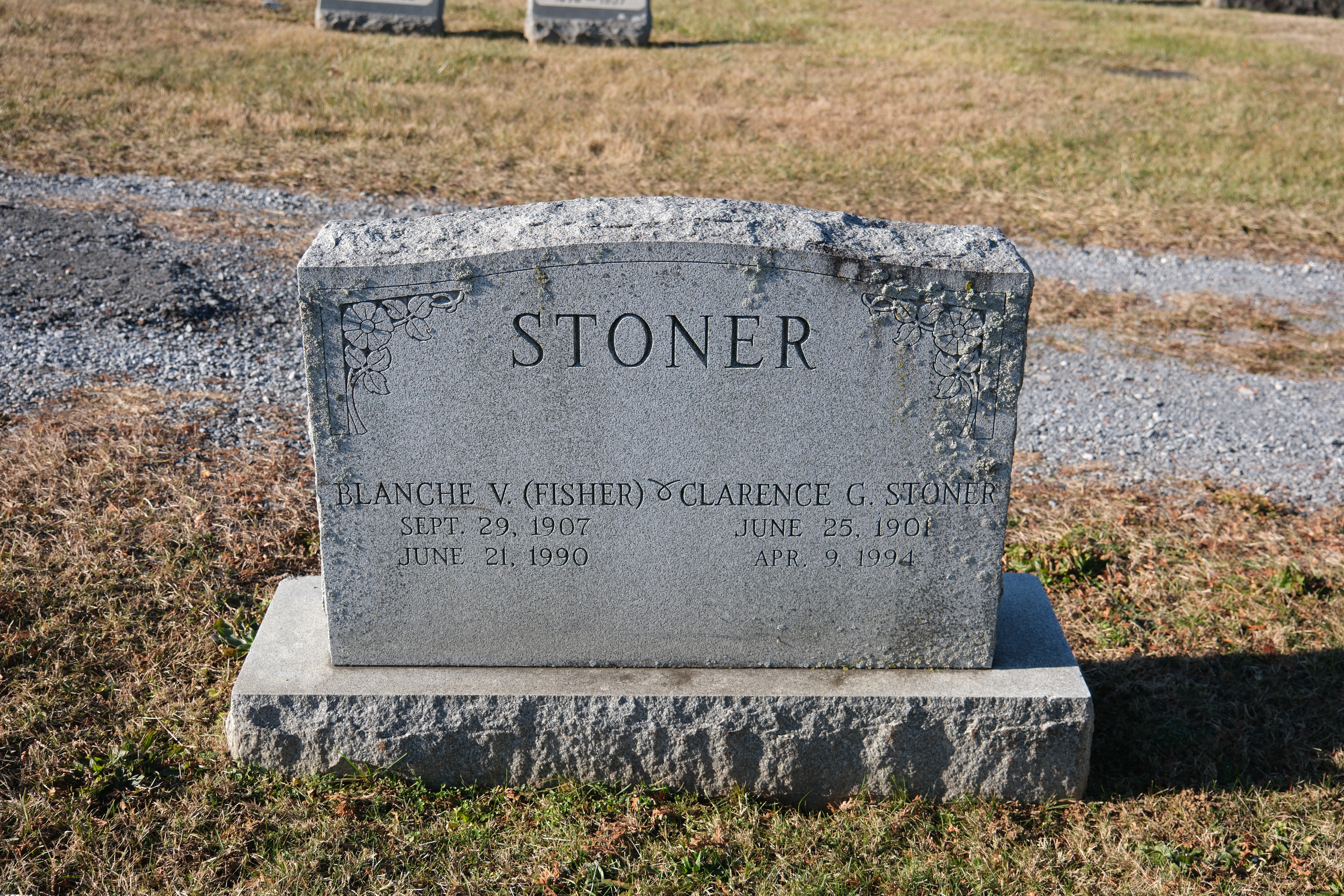
Grave of Stoner at Saint Johns Cemetery

Stoner married Blanche V. Fisher. They had a son, Edwin D. His wife predeceased him. He was a member and board member of Shiremanstown United Methodist Church. He lived for a time in Lower Allen Township.

Stoner died on April 9, 1994, at a nursing home in Camp Hill. He was buried in Saint Johns Cemetery in Shiremanstown.
