= Lou Smyth =

American football player (1898–1964)

Profile
- Positions: Fullback, tailback

Personal information
- Born: March 19, 1898; Cleburne, Texas, U.S.
- Died: September 11, 1964 (aged 66); Long Beach, California, U.S.
- Listed height: 6 ft 1 in (1.85 m)
- Listed weight: 200 lb (91 kg)

Career information
- High school: Sherman (TX)
- College: Centre

Career history
- Canton Bulldogs (1920–1923); Gilberton Cadamounts (1924); Rochester Jeffersons (1924–1925); Frankford Yellow Jackets (1925–1926); Providence Steamroller (1926); Hartford Blues (1926)

Awards and highlights
- 3× NFL champion (1922, 1923, 1926); Canton Daily News: 1st team all-NFL (1923)
- Stats at Pro Football Reference

Louie Lehman Smyth (March 19, 1898 – September 11, 1964) was an American professional football player for the Canton Bulldogs from 1920 until 1923. Smyth won two NFL championships with the Bulldogs in 1922 and 1923 and another with the Yellow Jackets in 1926. He also played for the Hartford Blues, Rochester Jeffersons and the Providence Steamroller. Outside of the National Football League (NFL), he played for the Gilberton Cadamounts of the Anthracite League. During his year in Gilberton, Smyth doubled as a player with the Jeffersons. In 1923 Smyth led the NFL in touchdowns, with 7.

Smyth was strong runner. He was able to run over opposing linemen due to his size. However, he was also an effective passer. Although he completed 25% of his passes, his passing average was better than 20-yards per completion. He also led the league in both touchdowns rushing and touchdown passes thrown, matching the record held by Jimmy Conzelman from the 1922 season. On defense, he may also have tied for the NFL lead in interceptions however no official statistics were kept at the time.

== Highlights ==
- Smyth connected on a few passes to get Canton kicker Pete Henry within field goal range, for a 6-0 win over the Chicago Bears.
- A Canton win over the Chicago Cardinals resulted on November 4, 1923 when Smyth threw a 45-yard pass to Guy Chamberlin to put Canton at the Cardinals 13-yard-line. Smyth later cross over the goal line for the winning score.
- On September 27, 1925, while playing for Rochester Jeffersons, Smyth threw a 55-yard pass to Shag Sheard during a 14-7 loss to the Canton Bulldogs.
- On October 18, 1925 Smyth threw a 40-yard pass to Eddie Lynch during a 7-6 defeat to the Waterbury Blues.
- A week later Smyth threw a 20-yard pass to Kellogg in a 33-13 loss to the Green Bay Packers.
