= Zembo Shrine Building =

Coordinates: 40.29057°N 76.90019°W

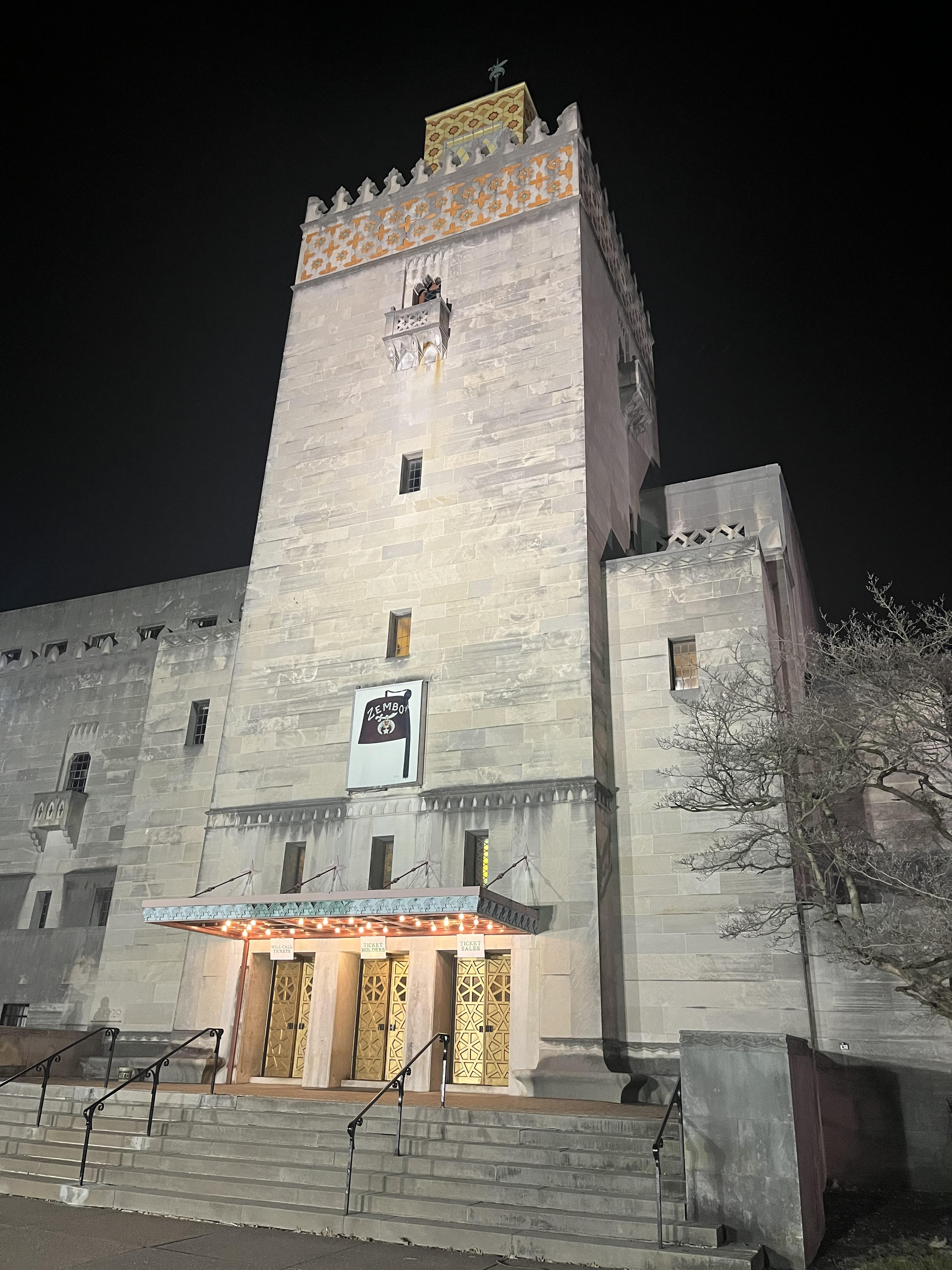
- The Zembo Shrine building at night in early 2022.
- Interactive map of Zembo Shrine Building
- Built: 1928–1930
- Architect: Charles Howard Lloyd
- Architectural style: Moorish Revival

The Zembo Shrine Building, also known as the Zembo Mosque (and the Zembo Temple Mosque), is a Masonic building located in the Uptown neighborhood of Harrisburg, Pennsylvania, United States. It is significant architecturally as an example of Moorish Revival architecture. Construction on the edifice was started in 1928, and opened the building in 1930. The building was listed on the National Register of Historic Places in 2024.

It was designed by prolific Harrisburg architect Charles Howard Lloyd.

Zembo Shrine is affiliated with Shriners International, a Masonic order and a philanthropic organization.

== Construction and design ==
Construction of the Zembo Shrine Building began in 1928 following a design competition won by architect Charles Howard Lloyd. The 62,621-square-foot building was completed at a cost of $1 million and formally dedicated on May 19, 1930.

Designed in a blend of Moorish Revival and Art Deco styles, the building features a prominent 120-foot minaret and tilework.

== Ownership ==
The building was to be sold in 2018 to TempleLive LLC. The initial asking price was $950,000. According to news reports, the building was to be sold by the Zembo Shriners in order to facilitate the organization's mission of raising money for 22 children's hospitals. However, that sale fell through when the Beaty Group was unable to integrate the venue with other regional performing arts establishments. In late February 2022, the Board of Directors of Zembo Shriners announced that the building was no longer for sale and it would remain with the Fraternal organization.

== Historic persons and events ==
The Zembo building has played host to many events throughout the history of Harrisburg, including Governor's Balls, graduation ceremonies, circuses, and social events.

Pennsylvania State Senator M. Harvey Taylor, for whom a prominent Harrisburg bridge is named, served as Potentate of Zembo Shriners in 1932.

On September 15, 1960, John F. Kennedy made a campaign stop at Zembo Shrine. Comedian and television host Johnny Carson performed here in 1962 for a Chamber of Commerce ceremony.

On Tuesday, October 4, 2016, Hillary Clinton made a campaign stop at Zembo Shrine.

== Sporting events ==
The Harrisburg Senators, a basketball team, played there during 1947−1951.

The World Wide Wrestling Federation, and its successor the World Wrestling Federation, promoted over 160 live events between 1964 and 1983, which included notable performers like Arnold Skaaland, Bruno Sammartino, Killer Kowalski, Ernie Ladd, Lou Albano, Louis Cyr (Gilles Poisson), Sgt. Slaughter, Bob Backlund, Don Kernodle, Jimmy Snuka, The Wild Samoans, Rocky Johnson, Hulk Hogan, and other notable stars of the era.
