= All-Lancaster Red Roses =

The All-Lancaster Red Roses were an Eastern League of Professional Football team that played during the league's only year of existence, 1926. They finished third in the 10-team league with a 5-2-3 record (five wins, two losses and three ties). They played in the league championship against the Bethlehem Bears, and though they lost 3–0, the league still considered the Red-Roses the league champion.
