= Eastern League of Professional Football =

US American football minor league

- Sport: Football
- Founded: 1926
- Founder: James H. Gildea
- Folded: 1927
- Director: Herman Meyer
- No. of teams: 10
- Country: United States
- Last champion: All-Lancaster Red Roses
- Most titles: All-Lancaster Red Roses

The Eastern League of Professional Football was an American football minor league formed in 1926 by independent clubs from Pennsylvania and New Jersey (separate from the "Eastern Pennsylvania Football League" which played in the late 1930s and early 1940s before World War II, along with the Middle Atlantic's Dixie League). The Eastern League was a regional minor league that never intended to challenge either the National Football League or even Red Grange's new American Football League's, dominance over the sport.

In the league's first season the championship was awarded to All-Lancaster Red Roses over the Bethlehem Bears in a controversial move.

== History ==
In January 1926, James H. Gildea, the owner/manager of the Coaldale Big Green football club, began pushing his idea for a football league in eastern Pennsylvania and New Jersey. Gildea's intention was to organize a circuit of teams that were well established and successful but unable to compete financially with the teams of the National Football League. As the core of the new circuit, Gildea sought out the membership of the old Anthracite League clubs. He also courted several other well established Pennsylvania and New Jersey clubs.

=== 1926 season ===
By the time the 1926 football season opened, ten teams were on board with the newly christened Eastern League of Professional Football. The league's first season had plenty of ups and downs, including financial difficulties that led one club to drop out of the circuit, and a controversy surrounding the championship. The game on the field, however, was very competitive. Five teams had league records of .500 or better. However, the Eastern League's still remained organized until the next season.

==== 1926 Championship controversy ====
The Bethlehem Bears and the All-Lancaster Red Roses were the top two teams in the league. On November 28, 1926 both teams meet for a game that would most likely determine the league champion. The Bears won the 3–0 due to a last minute field goal by Gyp Downey.

The Bears ended the season with 6–2–2 record against league opponents and a post-season victory over All-Lancaster. Bethlehem felt that these actions were enough to legitimize their claim to an Eastern League championship. However, there was some question regarding Bethlehem's claim to the championship. These questions may have been related to the introduction of several "ringers" into the Bears line-up for the team's final four games against Eastern League opponents. Local newspapers soon reported that the league awarded the title to the 5–2–3 All-Lancaster Red Roses. Presumably on the basis of that team's October victory over the second-place Gilberton Catamounts. After the season, Bethlehem offered the Pottsville Maroons of the National Football League $4,000 to play them at home. The Bears then lost to Pottsville in a lopsided defeat.

1926 League standings
Team	Wins	Losses	Ties	%	PF	PA	Notes
Bethlehem Bears	6	2	2	.750	72	45	
Gilberton Cadamounts	5	2	2	.714	51	22	
All-Lancaster Red Roses	5	2	3	.714	49	49	Awarded league championship
Mount Carmel Wolverines	5	3	1	.625	91	43	
Coaldale Big Green	4	4	3	.500	63	43	
Atlantic City Roses	2	4	2	.333	22	65	
Shenandoah Red Jackets	2	5	1	.286	55	41	
Mount Airy Athletic Club	1	3	1	.250	13	67	
Newark Blues	1	6	0	.142	7	58	
Clifton Heights Black & Orange	1	1	1	.500	3	10	Withdrew from league 13 October 1926

^{*} This table is shows both league and non-league unofficial standings.

The All-Lancaster Red Roses were named the 1926 Eastern League of Professional Football Champions.

=== 1927 season ===
1927 League standings
Team	Wins	Losses	Ties	%	PF	PA
All-Lancaster Roses	5	0	0	1.000	96	8
Atlantic City Roses	5	1	0	.833	79	13
Coaldale Big Green	3	3	0	.500	40	61
Newark Blues	1	3	1	.250	32	74
Bethlehem Bears	1	3	1	.250	13	50
Shenandoah Red Jackets	0	5	0	.000	6	77
Wilkes-Barre Panthers†	1	1	0	.500	18	1

^{†} Forfeited the game against Atlantic City (0–1) for a chance to play against Staten Island Stapletons and never returned.
