= James H. Gildea =

American journalist (1890–1988)

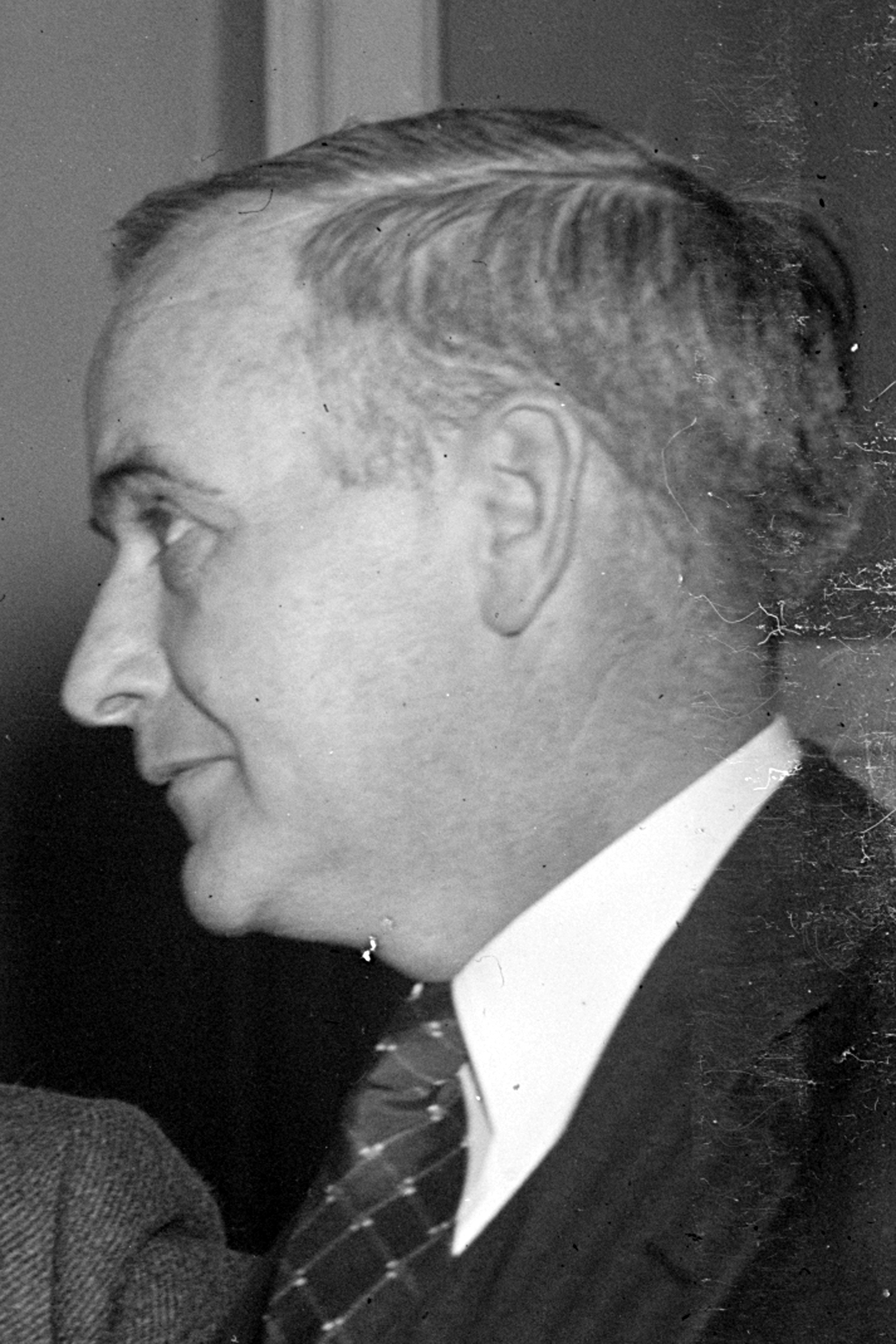
- Gildea in March 1937

Member of the U.S. House of Representatives from Pennsylvania's 13th district
- In office January 3, 1935 – January 3, 1939
- Preceded by: George F. Brumm
- Succeeded by: Ivor D. Fenton

Personal details
- Born: October 21, 1890 Coaldale, Pennsylvania, U.S.
- Died: June 5, 1988 (aged 97) Arlington, Virginia, U.S.
- Party: Democratic
- Profession: Manager Coaldale Big Green, Superintendent of Coaldale State Hospital, Chairman of Coaldale Relief Society, Newspaperman, Politician,

James Hilary Gildea (October 21, 1890 – June 5, 1988) was an American politician, newspaperman and a Democratic member of the U.S. House of Representatives from Pennsylvania.

== Formative years ==
James H. Gildea was born in Coaldale Schuylkill County, Pennsylvania on October 21, 1890. He was apprenticed to the printing trade in 1905.

== Career ==
Gildea was engaged in the newspaper publishing business from 1910, when he founded the Coaldale Observer. He worked as chairman of the Coaldale Relief Society from 1930 to 1933, and of the Panther Valley Miners' Equalization Committee.

Gildea was elected as a Democrat to the Seventy-fourth and to the Seventy-fifth Congresses. He was an unsuccessful candidate for reelection in 1938, 1940, and 1950.

He then resumed his newspaper work and continued publishing until his retirement in 1972. He also worked as superintendent of the Coaldale State Hospital from 1962 to 1965 and managed a professional football team, the Coaldale Big Green.

He was a resident of Arlington, Virginia, until his death.

== Death ==
Gildea died in Arlington on June 5, 1988. He was buried in St. Joseph's Cemetery in Summit Hill, Pennsylvania.

== Sources ==
- United States Congress. "James H. Gildea (id: G000182)". Biographical Directory of the United States Congress.
- The Political Graveyard
- Coaldale's Man of Action (football)

U.S. House of Representatives
Preceded by George F. Brumm	Member of the U.S. House of Representatives from Pennsylvania's 13th congressional district January 3, 1935 – January 3, 1939	Succeeded by Ivor D. Fenton
