= Pittsburgh Champions =

Professional softball team

The Pittsburgh Champions were a professional softball team based in Lower Burrell, Pennsylvania that played in the North American Softball League (NASL) in 1980.

== Team history ==
Pittsburgh was represented by the Pittsburgh Hardhats in the first professional league, the American Professional Slo-Pitch League (APSPL), beginning with the founding of that league in 1977. After three seasons, Ted Stepien, owner of the Cleveland Stepien's Competitors, left to form a new league, the NASL, with the Fort Wayne Huggie Bears and the Milwaukee Schlitz, APSPL champions from 1979. The Hardhats continued in the APSPL in 1980, and NASL teams were formed in Cincinnati and Lexington, Kentucky as well to compete with existing APSPL franchises there. Stepien owned many of the NASL teams, including the Champions.

The Champions played at LaRussa Field, Sokol Club in Lower Burrell, just outside of Pittsburgh. The Hardhats owner Jim DiIorio brought a challenge in federal court in an attempt to prevent splitting the young professional sport. The Hardhats also brought a legal challenge against new Champions player and General Manager Roger Snatchko for breach of contract as he had been under contract with the Hardhats previously. That lawsuit was withdrawn because a salary amount was not specified in the Hardhat contract. Tensions with Stepien remained as he tried to lure talent away from the APSPL teams, notably Chuck Lazar, a football player from near-by Allegheny College who had been in-camp with the Pittsburgh Steelers and had played previously with the Hardhats. Lazar would play briefly for the Champions.

The Champions struggled in 1980, finishing in last place of the Eastern Division with a record of 25-39 (.391), 11.5 games behind the division-winning Detroit Auto Kings. The Milwaukee Schlitz won the 1980 NASL World Series 5–2 over Detroit with Ken Parker (.586 BA) of Milwaukee honored as Series MVP. Ron Olesiak (.555, 34 HRs, 124 RBIs) of Chicago Nationwide Advertising was the NASL league MVP. Outfielder Roger Snatchko (.478 BA) was the only Champion to make the all-NASL team. Fred Ryan hit 29 home-runs for Pittsburgh, 7th most in the NASL, and Jim Picard, Ed Zalewski, Mark Johnson and Roger Snatchko made the mid-season All-Star team.

Across town, the Hardhats had their best season, finishing with a 44-19 (.698) record, trailing only the Kentucky Bourbons who they upset 3–2 in the playoffs to advance to their first APSPL World Series, where they were swept 3-0 by the Rochester Express.

After the season, the leagues officially merged, but only the Milwaukee Schlitz would go to the new United Professional Softball League (UPSL) and the Champions disbanded. The Hardhats moved to the Champions stadium, LaRussa Field in Lower Burrell in 1981, where they continued to play until the UPSL folded after the 1982 season, bringing an end to the professional softball era for men in the United States.

== Pittsburgh Champions record ==
Year	Record	Pct	Finish	Division	Playoffs	League
1980	25-39	.391	4th	Eastern	-	NASL
