= Lehigh Valley Crocs =

Names
- Full name: Lehigh Valley Crocs Australian Rules Football Club

Club details
- Founded: 1999

The Lehigh Valley Crocs was a men's Australian Rules Football team that was part of the United States Australian Football League

The team, based in Nazareth, Pennsylvania, United States, was founded in April 1999 by Michelle Weissmann Giabardo, who also became the USAFL vice president of the East Coast division. Robert Giabardo was the team's head coach.
