= Clifton Heights Orange & Black =

American football team

General information
- Founded: 1921
- Folded: c1932
- Stadium: Kent Field
- Headquartered: Clifton Heights, Pennsylvania, United States
- Colors: Orange, Black

Personnel
- Owner: Clifton Heights Athletic Association
- General manager: James E. "Baron" Gallagher
- Head coach: Rusty Yarnell

Team history
- Clifton Heights Orange & Black (1921-c1932)

League / conference affiliations
- Independent (1921-1926, 1926-1932); Eastern League of Professional Football (1926)

The Clifton Heights Orange and Black was a professional football team from Clifton Heights, Pennsylvania, a town located just to the southwest of Philadelphia, from 1921 until around 1932. The team was operated by the Clifton Heights Athletic Association to compete against the other towns of Delaware County. The team was managed by James E. Gallagher and coached by Rusty Yarnell, who also played with the team for a number of years. The Orange and Black consistently fielded strong teams that drew the attention of competitive clubs from neighboring Philadelphia, New Jersey and Delaware. The Orange & Black even played the Frankford Yellow Jackets and Pottsville Maroons of the early National Football League.

In 1926 Clifton Heights joined the newly formed Eastern League of Professional Football. However, the team soon dropped out of the league on October 13, 1926 due to a $1500 debt incurred during a span of just three weeks from their association with the league. Soon after the Orange and Black returned to the independent ranks until around 1932 when the team is thought to have folded. The pro football archives show no data for the Orange and Black after their 1932 season.

The Orange and Black won Delaware County Titles in 1922 and 1923.
