= Shenandoah Red Jackets =

The Shenandoah Red Jackets were an Eastern League of Professional Football team based in Shenandoah, Pennsylvania, United States that played during the league's only year of existence, 1926. They went 2-5-1 (two wins, five losses and one tie), finishing seventh in the league.
