= Mount Carmel Wolverines =

The Mount Carmel Wolverines were an Eastern League of Professional Football team based in Mount Carmel, Pennsylvania, United States that played during the league's only year of existence, 1926. They finished fourth in the league with a 5-3-1 record (five wins, three losses and one tie).
