= Coaldale Big Green =

Professional football team based in Pennsylvania, US

General information
- Founded: 1912
- Folded: 1933
- Stadium: Coaldale Field (1912–1924); Traveling team (1925–1933)
- Headquartered: Coaldale, Pennsylvania, United States
- Colors: Green, White
- Mascot: Yatsko

Personnel
- Owners: Coaldale Athletic Association; James H. Gildea
- General manager: James H. Gildea
- Head coach: Al Nemzic (1926)

Team history
- Coaldale Football (1912–17); Coaldale Big Green (1917–29)

League / conference affiliations
- Independent (1912–1923, 1925, 1927-1933); Anthracite League (1924); Eastern League of Professional Football (1926)

Championships
- Curran Cup: 3; 1921, 1922, 1923

The Coaldale Big Green was an early professional football team based in Coaldale, Pennsylvania. The club played as an independent until joining the Anthracite League in 1924. After leaving the league in 1924, the team spent its 1925 season as an independent, then joined the short-lived Eastern League of Professional Football in 1926. While the most well known Anthracite League team is the Pottsville Maroons, which jumped to the National Football League in 1925 and immediately established itself as a championship contender, the most consistently successful club in the coal region was the Big Green. Coaldale won the coal region's Curran Cup in 1921, 1922 and 1923.

== History ==
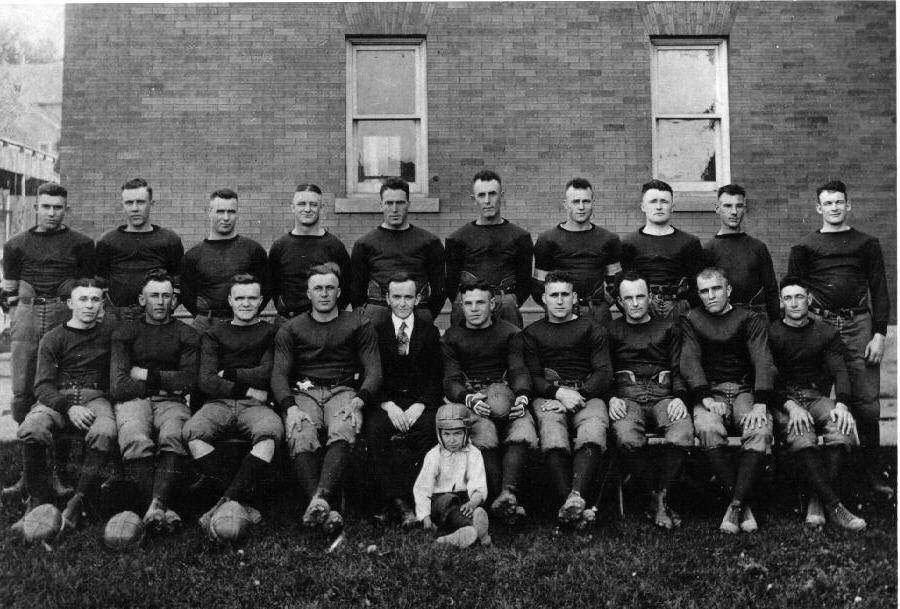
Coaldale Big Green: early 1920s

The team was formed in 1912 by the Coaldale Athletic Association and James H. Gildea, who would manage the team for 21 seasons, with a roster of mostly local talent. While nearby towns, such as Pottsville and Gilberton favored importing players for their teams, Gildea preferred searching his own area for players. Arguably the team's two best players were James "Blue" Bonner and Jack "Honeyboy" Evans. Both men were Coaldale natives. In 1912, Gildea combined two smaller and earlier Coaldale football teams, the Old Street Stars and the Coaldale Rosebuds. While the Big Green organization dates back to 1912, the name "Big Green" was not applied to the team until after adopting its famous green jerseys in 1917. From 1912 until 1917, the team was only known as Coaldale Football. The Big Green went on to win the Curran Cup in 1921, 1922, and 1923. The 1923 championship resulted in a 3–0 win over the Maroons.

=== Anthracite League ===
In 1924 James Gildea set up a meeting at the town hall in Coaldale to establish the league made up of the coal region teams. The managers and owners of every major coal region team and the local sportswriters were all invited.

The main reason for the league was to first put an end to teams raiding their opponents' rosters for big-name players. During this, money was being handed over by several managers in record amounts, as they hoped to lure the finest talent available. When the on-field talent wasn't available for signing, these managers would then steal players from other teams with the offer of higher salaries. As a result of the meeting, the teams agreed that the league teams had to secure all of their players prior to the start of the league season. A required list of eligible players had to also be filed by each team for all the others to observe. The plan was that all teams would be required to finish the season with the same players listed on the roster at the start of the year. Also a monetary forfeit of $500 or $1,000 had to be posted by each team to guarantee that the team would stick to its preseason player roster during league play and that there was no objection to any player being signed.

The second reason for establishing a league was to allow for the development of a concise scheduling format for the teams in the region. In the early 1920s, finding open dates when teams could play each other was difficult. Games were often delayed until the latest possible moment, usually 2–3 days before game day. One reason for this was the inability of some clubs to draw enough people into the ballpark. Many of the teams spent a lot of money signing talented players and in order to play them, the managers and owners relied heavily of the number of people in attendance for both home and road games. Every manager knew the importance and longed for the benefits of a sound, opponent-by-opponent schedule. As a result of the meeting, a schedule was agreed upon of twelve set dates from the beginning of October until the end of November. This move was also designed to allow non-league contests of natural rivals from nearby towns to take place at different intervals during and after the league's scheduled games. Coaldale also constructed a grandstand which could accommodate 8,000 fans at Coaldale Field. Their projects cost an estimated $3,500. Many of the other teams spent a combined $15,000 in stadium repairs in 1924.

With these two issues addressed, the Anthracite League was formed. However, when it became clear that the other teams weren't following the rules pertaining to signing players, Gildea and the Big Green left the league.

=== 1925–1933 ===
The Big Green fell on hard times after they left the Anthracite League. They won only four games in 1924. Around the midpoint mark of the following season, they became strictly a traveling team because every football fan in the region joined the Maroons' fanbase when the team joined the NFL. The team then joined the short-lived Eastern League of Professional Football during its one season in 1926. The team then played independently before folding sometime around 1933.
