= Gilberton Catamounts =

General information
- Founded: c1920
- Folded: c1929
- Stadium: Stoddard Field
- Headquartered: Gilberton, Pennsylvania, United States
- Colors: Unknown

Personnel
- General manager: Joe Keating; James Rafferty; T. Conner
- Head coach: Charlie Copley

Team history
- Gilberton Catamounts (1920s)

League / conference affiliations
- Anthracite League (1924); Eastern League of Professional Football (1926-27)

The Gilberton Catamounts, sometimes called the Gilberton Cadamounts and the Gilberton Duck Streeters, were a 1920s-era professional football team based in Gilberton, Pennsylvania. However, the team played many of its home games in nearby Mahanoy City because Gilberton's home field, Stoddard Field, was usually flooded. The borough got its "Ducktown" nickname mainly because of persistent flooding.

== Big money ==
The team played independently against other teams from Pennsylvania's "coal country". During the 1920s the teams based here paid large amounts of money to talented pro football players. Many players from the National Football League came to play football in this region because of the amount of money paid out. In 1924 Gilberton, under the managership of Joe Keating and James Rafferty, Gilberton acquired three new star players just days before their season opener. The team signed Ben Shaw, Cecil Grigg, and Lou Smyth. All three players were members of the Canton Bulldogs of the NFL. Ironically in 1924 the team played in the Anthracite League, which was formed to combat the out-of-control hiring of top professional football talent. It is no wonder that league folded after the 1924 season. The team later played in the Eastern League of Professional Football from 1926 until the league folded in 1927.

== Fritz Pollard ==
Pro Football Hall of Famer Fritz Pollard played with the team in 1923 and 1924. Coach Charlie Copley, a former teammate of Pollard's with the Akron Pros and the Milwaukee Badgers, recruited Pollard to play for the Catamounts. He became the first African-American to play football in the coal region.

== Hall of Famers ==
Gilberton Cadamounts Hall of Famers
Players
No.	Name	Position	Tenure	Inducted
—	Fritz Pollard	HB	1923–1924	2005
