= 1924 Pottsville Maroons season =

National Football League team season

- General manager: Dr. J.C. Striegel
- Head coach: Stan Cofall
- Home stadium: Minersville Park

Results
- Record: 12–1–1 (overall); 6–0–1 (AL)
- League place: 1st (Anthracite League)

The 1924 Pottsville Maroons season was their 5th season in existence. The club played in the Anthracite League would go on to post a 12-1-1 record and claim the League Championship. The team allowed just two touchdowns all year and did not lose until their 14th and final game of the year, a 10–7 loss to the Rochester Jeffersons of the National Football League (NFL). For the year Pottsville outscored their opponents by a cumulative score of 303 to 17.

Head coach was Stan Cofall, a 1916 All-American halfback from Notre Dame who had spent time in the NFL as a player and coach with the 1920 Cleveland Tigers the first iteration of the New York Giants in 1921.

The Maroons would themselves join the NFL in 1925.

== Schedule ==
Game	Date	Opponent	Result	Record	Venue	Attendance	Sources
1	September 21	Philadelphia Colwyn-Darby	**W** 39–0	1–0	Minersville Park	"a great crowd"	
2	September 28	Phillipsburg, New Jersey	**W** 78–0	2–0	Minersville Park		
3	October 5	at Wilkes-Barre Barons	**W** 34–0	3–0	Wilkes-Barre, PA		
4	October 12	Gilberton Cadamounts	**W** 17–0	4–0	Minersville Park	"one of largest ever"	
5	October 19	at Coaldale Big Green	**W** 10–7	5–0	Coaldale Field	10,000	
6	October 26	Reading Tigers	**W** 40–0	6–0	Minersville Park	4,000	
7	November 2	Shenandoah Yellow Jackets	**W** 7–0	7–0	Minersville Park	7,500	
8	November 8	at Millville Big Blue	**W** 6–0	8–0	MSAA Field	3,000	
9	November 9	at Atlantic City Roses	**W** 22–0	9–0	Bader Field	5,000+	
10	November 11	at Reading Tigers	**W** 33–0	10–0	Lauer's Park		
11	November 16	Gilberton Cadamounts	**T** 0-0	10–0–1	Minersville Park		
12	November 16	Coaldale Big Green	**W** 3–0	11–0–1	Minersville Park		
13	November 27	Shenandoah Yellow Jackets	**W** 7–0	12–0–1	Minersville Park		
14	November 30	**Rochester Jeffersons**	**L** 7–10	12–1–1	Minersville Park	"few in number"	
Notes: Non-league games in italics. • NFL opponent in **bold**.
Armistice Day: Tuesday, November 11 • Thanksgiving Day: Thursday, November 27.

== Anthracite League standings ==
Team	Games	Wins	Losses	Ties
Pottsville Maroons	14	12	1	1
Gilberton Cadamounts	13	4	3	1
Shenandoah Yellow Jackets	8	4	4	0
Coaldale Big Green	10	4	6	0
Wilkes-Barre Barons	1	0	1	0

== Roster ==
Linemen

- Clarence Beck
- Vic Biehl
- Larry Conover
- Vic Emmanuel
- Pete Henry
- Al "Doggy" Julian
- Marhefka
- McNamara
- Miller
- Gus Sonnenberg
- Striegel
- Yeasted
- Yost

Backs

- Carl Beck
- Bots Brunner
- Latone
- Lebengood
- Al Nemzic
- Harry Robb
- Johnny Scott
- Barney Wentz
