= 1922 All-Pro Team =

Official list of the best NFL players in 1922

Tackle Pete Henry

The 1922 All-Pro Team consists of American football players chosen by various selectors as the best players at their positions for the All-Pro team of the National Football League (NFL) for the 1922 NFL season. Teams were selected by the Canton Daily News (CDN) and by George Halas (GH). Halas selected a first team and a second team.

== Team ==
Player	Team	Position	Selector(s)
Paddy Driscoll	Chicago Cardinals	Quarterback	CDN, GH
Doc Alexander	Rochester Jeffersons	Center, kicker, punter, return specialist	CDN, GH
Eddie Anderson	Chicago Bears, Rochester Jeffersons	End, kicker, punter, return specialist	CDN, GH-2
Hunk Anderson	Chicago Bears	Guard, kicker, punter, return specialist	GH-2
Hugh Blacklock	Chicago Cardinals	Tackle	GH
Benny Boynton	Rochester Jeffersons	Back	GH-2
Bird Carroll	Canton Bulldogs	End	CDN
Guy Chamberlin	Canton Bulldogs	End	GH
Doc Elliott	Canton Bulldogs	Fullback	CDN
Jim Flower	Akron Pros	Center	GH-2
Fred Gillies	Chicago Cardinals	Tackle	GH-2
Russ Hathaway	Canton Bulldogs, Dayton Triangles	Guard, tackle	GH-2
Ed Healey	Chicago Bears, Rock Island Independents	Tackle	GH
Pete Henry	Canton Bulldogs	Tackle	CDN, GH
Steamer Horning	Toledo Maroons	Tackle	CDN
Tommy Hughitt	Buffalo All-Americans	Back	GH
Rip King	Akron Pros	Fullback	GH
Jim Laird	Buffalo All-Americans	Fullback	GH-2
Curly Lambeau	Green Bay Packers	Tailback	GH-2
Al Nesser	Akron Pros	Guard	GH-2
Duke Osborn	Canton Bulldogs	Guard	CDN
Harry Robb	Canton Bulldogs	Tailback	CDN
Herb Stein	Toledo Maroons	Guard	CDN, GH
Dutch Sternaman	Chicago Bears	Halfback	GH-2
Pete Stinchcomb	Chicago Bears	Halfback	CDN, GH
Luke Urban	Buffalo All-Stars	End	GH
Tillie Voss	Rock Island Independents, Akron Pros	End	GH-2
