= 1923 All-Pro Team =

Official list of the best NFL players in 1923

Tackle Pete Henry

The 1923 All-Pro Team consists of American football players chosen by various selectors as the best players at their positions for the All-Pro team of the National Football League (NFL) for the 1923 NFL season. Tackle Pete Henry of the Canton Bulldogs and quarterback Paddy Driscoll of the Chicago Cardinals were the only two players unanimously selected as first-team All-Pros by all known selectors. Two African-American players won All-Pro honors: ends Inky Williams of the Hammond Pros and Duke Slater of the Rock Island Independents.

== Selectors and key ==
For the 1923 season, there are four known selectors of All-Pro Teams. They are:

GB = The Green Bay Press-Gazette compiled first, second, and third teams, based on polling of sports writers from the Green Bay Press-Gazette, Racine Times Call, Pittsburgh Post, Racine Journal News, Pittsburgh Gazette Times, Milwaukee Wisconsin News, Duluth News Tribune, Rock Island Argus, Akron Times, Cleveland News, Canton Repository, Ohio State Journal, Dayton Journal, Minnesota Daily Star, and St. Louis Times. The results of the above poll were simultaneously published in the Rock Island Argus, Ohio State Journal, and Canton Repository.

CE = Collyer's Eye was a Chicago sports journal. Its All-Pro teams (a first and second team) were selected by E. G. Brands.

VD = Vince Dolan, sports editor of the Canton Daily News picked first- and second-team All-Pro teams. Dolan's picks were published in the Canton Daily News on December 16, 1923. Dolan also gave "honorable mention" recognition to players below his first and second team. The 11 players named to Dolan's first team included seven members of the undefeated 1923 Canton Bulldogs team that won the 1923 NFL championship.

GC = Guy Chamberlin (GC), player and head coach of the Canton Bulldogs, selected a 32-player All-Pro team that was published on December 16, 1923, in the Canton Daily News. Chamberlin's selections did not divide players into first, second, and third teams. Out of the 32 players selected by Chamberlin, 11 were his teammates on the Canton Bulldogs. Chamberlin did not, however, select himself as an All-Pro.

Players who were selected as first-team All-Pros by two of the above selectors are displayed in bold typeface. Players who have been inducted into the Pro Football Hall of Fame are designated with a "†" next to their names.

== Selections by position ==
=== Ends ===
End Inky Williams

Player	Team	Selector(s)
Inky Williams	Hammond	GB-1, VD-1
Gus Tebell	Columbus Tigers	GB-1, GC
Luke Urban	Buffalo	CE-1, VD-HM
Guy Chamberlin^{†}	Canton Bulldogs	GB-2, CE-1
Bird Carroll	Canton Bulldogs	VD-1, GC
Glen Carberry	Buffalo All-Americans	GC
Paul G. Goebel	Columbus Tigers	VD-HM, GC
Tillie Voss	Toledo Maroons	GB-3 [T], VD-HM, GC
Frank Hanny	Chicago Bears	GB-2, CE-2
Ben Winkelman	Milwaukee Badgers	GB-3
Richard O'Donnell	Duluth Kelleys	GB-3
Dick Reichle	Milwaukee Badgers	CE-2

=== Tackles ===
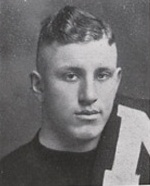
Tackle Link Lyman

Player	Team	Selector(s)
Pete Henry^{†}	Canton Bulldogs	GB-1, CE-1, VD-1, GC
Ed Healey^{†}	Chicago Bears	GB-1, GC [G]
Bub Weller^{†}	St. Louis All-Stars	GB-1
Link Lyman^{†}	Canton Bulldogs	CE-2, VD-1, GC
Duke Slater^{†}	Rock Island Independents	GB-2, CE-1
Russ Hathaway	Dayton Triangles	GB-2, GC
Eddie Sauer	Dayton Triangles	GC
Gus Sonnenberg	Buffalo/Columbus	VD-HM, GC
Ralph Scott	Chicago Bears	GC
Steamer Horning	Toledo Maroons	VD-HM, GC
Cub Buck	Green Bay Packers	GB-3, VD-HM
Elmer McCormick	Buffalo All-Americans	CE-2

=== Guards ===
Player	Team	Selector(s)
Swede Youngstrom	Buffalo All-Americans	GB-1, CE-1
Hec Garvey	Chicago Bears	GB-2, CE-1, GC
Rudy Comstock	Canton Bulldogs	VD-1, GC
Bub Weller	St. Louis All-Stars	GB-1
Hunk Anderson	Chicago Bears	VD-1
Duke Osborn	Canton Bulldogs	VD-HM, GC
Jack Sack	Columbus Tigers	GC
Clyde Zoia	Chicago Cardinals	GC
Frank Morrissey	Buffalo	GB-2
Al Nesser	Akron Pros	GB-3, VD-HM
Tom McNamara	Toledo Maroons	GB-3
Stan Keck	Cleveland Indians	CE-2
Herb Sies	Rock Island Independents	CE-2

=== Centers ===
Player	Team	Selector(s)
Larry Conover	Canton Bulldogs	GB-2, VD-1, GC
Harry Mehre	Minneapolis Marines	GB-1
Walt Kreinheder	St. Louis All-Stars	CE-1
George Trafton^{†}	Chicago Bears	CE-2, VD-HM, GC
Charlie Guy	Cleveland Indians	GB-3, VD-HM, GC

=== Quarterbacks ===
Player	Team	Selector(s)
Paddy Driscoll^{†}	Chicago Cardinals	GB-1, CE-1, VD-1 [HB], GC [HB]
Harry Robb	Canton Bulldogs	GB-2 [HB], CE-2 [HB], VD-1, GC
Joey Sternaman	Duluth Kelleys	CE-2, GC
Johnny Armstrong	Rock Island Independents	GB-3
Wooky Roberts	Canton Bulldogs	VD-HM

=== Halfbacks ===
Player	Team	Selector(s)
Cecil Grigg	Canton Bulldogs	CE-1, GC
Jimmy Conzelman^{†}	Milwaukee Badgers	GB-2 [QB], VD-1, GC [QB]
Jim Thorpe^{†}	Oorang Indians	GB-1
Al Michales	Akron Pros	GB-1
Hal Erickson	Milwaukee Badgers	GB-3, CE-1
Lou Smyth	Canton Bulldogs	GC
Edward Sternaman	Chicago Bears	GC
Bob Rapp	Columbus Tigers	GC
Curly Lambeau^{†}	Green Bay Packers	GB-2
Gaylord Stinchcomb	Columbus Tigers	CE-2, VD-HM
Milton Romney	Racine	GB-3
Pete Casey	St. Louis All-Stars	VD-HM

=== Fullbacks ===
Player	Team	Selector(s)
Doc Elliott	Canton Bulldogs	GB-1, VD-1, GC
Hank Gillo	Racine Legion	CE-1, VD-HM
Ben Jones	Canton Bulldogs	GC
Dinger Doane	Milwaukee Badgers	GB-2
Jack Crangle	Chicago Cardinals	CE-2
Johnny Kyle	Cleveland Indians	GB-3, VD-HM
