= Stan Robb =

American football player (1899–1959)

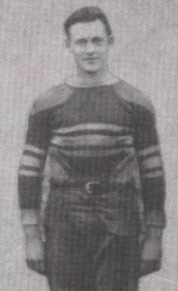

Profile
- Positions: End, guard, tackle

Personal information
- Born: September 19, 1899; Pittsburgh, Pennsylvania, U.S.
- Died: January 9, 1959 (aged 59); Philadelphia, Pennsylvania, U.S.
- Listed height: 6 ft 0 in (1.83 m)
- Listed weight: 185 lb (84 kg)

Career information
- High school: Peabody (PA); Mercersburg (PA)
- College: Centre, West Virginia Wesleyan

Career history

Playing
- Holmesburg Athletic Club (1922); Philadelphia Quakers (1922); Clifton Heights Orange & Black (1923); Pottsville Maroons (1924); Canton Bulldogs (1926); Clifton Heights Orange & Black (1927)

Coaching
- Peabody High School (1918) Assistant

Awards and highlights
- Anthracite League champion (1924)

Career NFL statistics
- Games played: 3
- Games started: 3
- Touchdowns: 1
- Stats at Pro Football Reference

Stanley Rankin Robb (September 19, 1899 – January 9, 1959) was an American football lineman and end who played one season in the National Football League (NFL) for the Canton Bulldogs. A native of Pittsburgh, Pennsylvania, he attended Peabody High School and Mercersburg Academy, after which he played college football for the Centre Praying Colonels (1920) and West Virginia Wesleyan Bobcats (1921). Robb began his professional football career in 1922, splitting the year between the Holmesburg Athletic Club and Philadelphia Quakers. He played the 1923 season with the Clifton Heights Orange & Black before joining the Pottsville Maroons for their Anthracite League championship year in 1924. Robb joined the Canton Bulldogs, coached by his brother Harry, in 1926, playing what would be his only three games in the NFL while scoring one touchdown. He later returned to Clifton Heights to finish his career.

== Early life and education ==
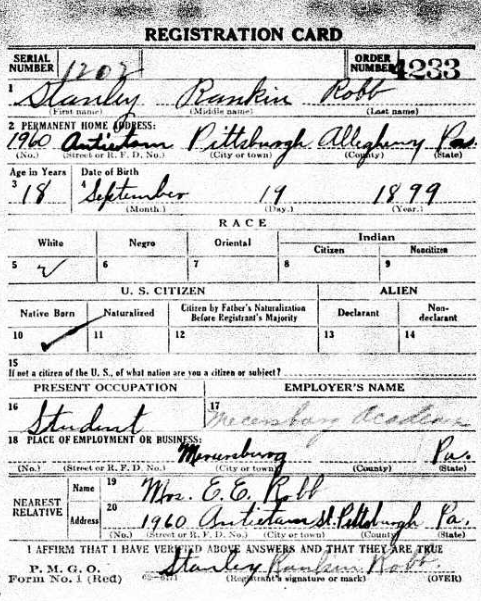
Robb's World War I registration card

Stanley Rankin Robb was born on September 19, 1899, in Pittsburgh, Pennsylvania. He attended Peabody High School where he played football as a tackle, being described as a "star" player. Robb also attended Mercersburg Academy for a time. Around 1917, he enlisted in World War I. After graduating from high school, he assisted in coaching the linemen at Peabody in 1918. The following year, he was reported as having joined the football team at Penn State College, although a news article from 1920 said that he had played for The Kiski School that year, being a "star guard."

Robb began playing college football for the Centre Praying Colonels in 1920, appearing as a right guard, left guard, and end. He appeared in a number of games for the team, including their match that season against the Harvard Crimson. In the 1920 season finale against TCU, he blocked a punt and returned it for a touchdown. Robb was known for his speed at end, with the Chester Times writing that he "gained national repute as one of the fastest ends ever turned out of Centre College."

Robb left to play for the West Virginia Wesleyan football team in 1921. He had left the team by the 1922 season.

In addition to playing football, Robb also participated in basketball and track and field with his schools. At Centre, he also acted in school minstrel productions.

== Professional career ==
Robb began his professional football career in September 1922, starting the season as an end for the Holmesburg Athletic Club. By October, he had joined the Philadelphia Quakers. Following the 1922 season, Robb was signed by the Clifton Heights Orange & Black. The Chester Times said that, "The reputation of Stanley Robb not only while he starred for Centre College, but while he was played last season with Holmesburg and the Philadelphia Quakers, is such that he needs no formal introduction to county fans." He missed several games early in the season, but returned at the end of October. With Clifton Heights, he was mentioned as being one of the "stars" comprising "one of the greatest collections of college stars ever seen on a Delaware County gridiron."

Robb played in the Anthracite League with the Pottsville Maroons in 1924. The Maroons ended up winning the league championship. Two years later, Robb was signed by the Canton Bulldogs of the National Football League (NFL). He made his NFL debut against the New York Giants on November 2, 1926, and scored a touchdown in the 7–7 tie. He scored near the end of the game in what was described as a "lucky score" to prevent the Giants from winning. The Canton Daily News reported the play as follows:

That lucky touchdown cheated the Giants out of a victory, they well deserved. They outplayed the Bulldogs most of the way and had victory within their reach when Vick, the new quarterback of the Bulldogs threw a forward pass to Ben Roderick, late of Columbia in the last five minutes. Roderick was standing on the five yard line waiting to receive the ball, when a Giant player rushed behind him and knocked the ball out of his arm. But along came Stanley Robb, of the famous Robb family. Robb is fleet of foot and he grabbed the leather sphere out of the air before it hit the ground. All that stood between him and a touchdown was about five yards of turf, and the younger Robb spanned that five yards in two leaps.

Robb appeared in two additional games for the Bulldogs. His next game was against the Hartford Blues on November 7, which resulted in a 16–7 loss. He and Ralph Nichols were both ejected after fighting each other. Robb had tackled a Hartford player and Nichols, upset with the force which he used, grabbed Robb by the shoulders and "pulled him away rather roughly." Robb responded by punching him in the chin, and Nichols then began punching Robb all around before the official broke up the fight and dismissed both of them. His final game came against the Providence Steamrollers on November 11, after which he left the team.

Robb returned to the Clifton Heights Orange & Black in 1927.

== Personal life and death ==
Robb's brother Harry played college football at Penn State, and later played with him at Pottsville and Canton. Stan played under his brother, who both played and served as head coach, with Canton in 1926.

Robb married Beatrice M. Ritter in November 1937. He enlisted in World War II in February 1942. Robb died on January 9, 1959, at the age of 59.
