= Dick Rauch =

American football player and coach (1893–1970)

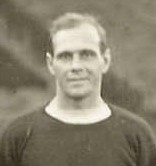
- Rauch in 1924

No. 14 (1925) 29/30 (1928)
- Positions: Center, Guard, Tackle

Personal information
- Born: July 15, 1893; Harrisburg, Pennsylvania, U.S.
- Died: October 9, 1970 (aged 77); Harrisburg, Pennsylvania, U.S.

Career information
- College: Penn State

Career history

Playing
- 1924–1926: Pottsville Maroons
- 1928: New York Yankees
- 1929: Boston Bulldogs

Coaching
- 1921–1922: Penn State (assistant)
- 1923: Colgate (assistant)
- 1924–1926: Pottsville Maroons
- 1928: New York Yankees
- 1929: Boston Bulldogs

scout
- 1921–1922: Penn State
- 1923: Colgate

Awards and highlights
- Anthracite League champion (1924); Disputed NFL champion (1925); NFL head coaching record: 33–24–3; First NFL coach to institute daily practices; Last Head coach of the Pottsville Maroons- Boston Bulldogs franchise; Last Head coach of the New York Yankees (NFL) franchise
- Coaching profile at Pro Football Reference

Other information
- Military career
- Allegiance: United States
- Branch: U.S. Army
- Service years: 1917–1919
- Conflicts: World War I

Richard Harvie Rauch (July 15, 1893 – October 9, 1970) was an American football player and coach. Rauch attended Pennsylvania State University. He was a player-coach for the Boston Bulldogs, New York Yankees and the Maroons over the course of his five-year career. Rauch made his professional debut in the National Football League (NFL) in 1925 with the Pottsville Maroons. He was also the first NFL coach to institute daily practices.

== Early career ==
Born in Harrisburg, Pennsylvania, Rauch attended high school at Harrisburg Tech in 1906. He did not make the football team until his senior year, in 1909. He played center on that team. After high school, he went to work in the Pennsylvania Steel Mills outside of Harrisburg for six years. Rauch decided to continue his education. In 1916 he entered Bethlehem Prep, located in Bethlehem, Pennsylvania, to brush up his mathematics and obtain sufficient credits to enter Penn State. At Bethlehem Prep, Rauch lettered in three sports, football, basketball and track.

== Penn State and the Army ==
In 1916 Rauch entered State College and he soon captained and played tight end on the school's freshman team. By 1917 he made the varsity team and played the entire season at end. At the end of the 1917 season Rauch joined the U.S. Army and was placed in the ordinance department and was stationed in Virginia.

He was discharged from the Army in August 1919, and returned to Penn State. By that time Rauch started at center, and then was put in at guard. His place at center was taken by Larry Conover. Rauch continued to play guard his senior year in 1920, with the exception of the last four games when he was shifted to tackle. After graduating Penn State retained him as assistant coach in 1921. He excelled in scouting. He performed the scouting duties for every college he served.

== Colgate ==
In 1923, Rauch went to Colgate University as the team's line coach. Colgate soon gave him a contract for the following year in 1924. However, he accepted an offer by the Pottsville Maroons as serve as head coach of their professional football team.

== Pro football ==
Maroons owner Dr. John Striegel hired Rauch, because he was a protégé of the strict discipline philosophy instituted by Penn State coach, Hugo Bezdek. During Rauch's first season with the Maroons, the team won the Anthracite League championship. The very next season the Maroon joined the NFL, and in just their first year in league, the franchise won the NFL championship before having it stripped away from them by the league in a controversial move.

The next season Rauch's Maroon completed a 10-2-1 record and captured third place in the NFL standings. However, after a 5–8 record in 1927, Rauch left the team to coach the New York Yankees. Following a 4–8 record with the Yankees during the 1928 season, Rauch returned to the Maroons franchise which had just been sold to a group of New Englanders who move the franchise to Boston and renamed the team the Boston Bulldogs.

The 1929 season was Rauch's last season coaching in the NFL. After a 4–4 record, the Maroons-Bulldogs franchise folded.

== Outside football ==
Besides being a football player and coach, Rauch also worked as an ornithologist, a steel worker, an electrician and a graduate electrical engineer. Dick spent his off-seasons writing poetry and traveled as far west as the Yukon to study the nesting habits of birds. He later put his knowledge of birds to use by exploring the Antarctic for the U.S. government.
