= Duke Osborn =

American football player (1897–1976)

No. 17, 7, 30, 8
- Positions: Guard, center

Personal information
- Born: February 1, 1897; Falls Creek, Pennsylvania, U.S.
- Died: November 2, 1976 (aged 79)
- Listed height: 5 ft 10 in (1.78 m)
- Listed weight: 188 lb (85 kg)

Career information
- High school: DuBois (DuBois, Pennsylvania)
- College: Penn State

Career history
- Canton Bulldogs (1921–1923); Cleveland Bulldogs (1924); Pottsville Maroons (1925–1928)

Awards and highlights
- 3× NFL champion (1922, 1923, 1924); Pottsville Maroons disputed championship team (1925); First-team All-Pro (1922); 2× Canton Daily News: 1st team all-NFL (1922, 1923); GB Press-Gazette: 2nd team all-NFL (1925)
- Stats at Pro Football Reference

Robert Duke Osborn (February 1, 1897 – November 2, 1976) was an American professional football player who played with the Canton Bulldogs during the team's National Football League Championship series years in the 1920s.

== Biography ==
After high school, Osborn attended Penn State University. Osborn made his professional debut in the National Football League (NFL) in 1921 with the Canton Bulldogs. He would go to help the Bulldogs win back-to-back NFL Championships in 1922 and 1923. During the course of his career, Osborn also played for the Cleveland Bulldogs and Pottsville Maroons. He spent a total of 8 years in the NFL. Osborn also became part owner of the Maroons in 1928, when team's owner, Dr. John G. Streigel, "loaned" the team to three players Wilbur "Pete" Henry, Herb Stein and Osborn. However, after the season Streigel, who probably still had majority ownership, sold the team to a New England–based partnership that included Maroons' standout George Kenneally.

After his career in football Osborn became a general superintendent for Oldsmobile's assembly division.
