= Clarence Beck =

American football player (1896–1962)

No. 15
- Position: Lineman

Personal information
- Born: March 13, 1896; Harrisburg, Pennsylvania, U.S.
- Died: August 20, 1962 (aged 66)
- Listed height: 5 ft 11 in (1.80 m)
- Listed weight: 200 lb (91 kg)

Career information
- College: Penn State

Career history
- Union Quakers of Philadelphia (1921); Pottsville Maroons (1924–1925)
- Stats at Pro Football Reference

Clarence Robert Beck (March 13, 1896 – August 20, 1962) was a professional football player from Harrisburg, Pennsylvania.

== Biography ==
Beck attended high school at Harrisburg Tech where he scored a 105-yard touchdown for Tech against their rival Steelton. After high school, Beck attended Pennsylvania State University where he became a star tackle. He made his professional debut in the National Football League in 1925 with the Pottsville Maroons and played in the NFL for one season.

Prior to that, he played for the independent Union Quakers of Philadelphia in 1921.

In 1924, Beck helped the Maroons win the 1924 Anthracite League championship. This move placed Clarence with his brother, Carl, on the Maroons team. In 1925, the Maroons entered the NFL. That year Clarence played on the Maroons team that won the 1925 NFL Championship, before it was stripped from the team due to a disputed rules violation.
