= Walter French (baseball) =

American baseball player (1899–1984)

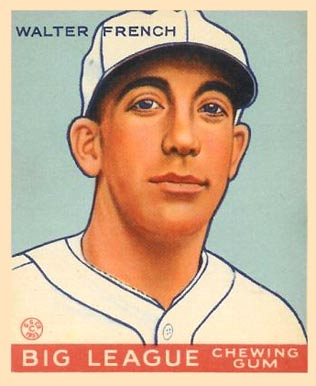
- Outfield
- Born: July 12, 1899; Moorestown, New Jersey, U.S.
- Died: May 13, 1984 (aged 84); Mountain Home, Arkansas, U.S.
- Batted: Left Threw: Right

MLB debut
- September 15, 1923, for the Philadelphia Athletics

Last MLB appearance
- October 6, 1929, for the Philadelphia Athletics

MLB statistics
- Batting average: .303
- Home runs: 2
- Runs batted in: 109
- Stats at Baseball Reference

Teams
- Philadelphia Athletics (1923–1929)

Career highlights and awards
- World Series champion (1929)

Walter French
Profile
- Position: Halfback

Career information
- College: Army; Rutgers

Career history
- 1923: Rochester Jeffersons
- 1925: Pottsville Maroons

Awards and highlights
- NFL champion (1925) -Disputed by the NFL; Collyers Eye Mag.: First-team All-NFL (1925); First-team All-American (1920); Third-team All-American (1921)

Other information
- Military career
- Allegiance: United States
- Branch: U.S. Army (1942–1946); U.S. Air Force (1947–1959)
- Service years: 1942–1959
- Rank: Lieutenant colonel
- Conflicts: World War II

Walter Edward French (July 12, 1899 – May 13, 1984) was an American professional baseball player. He played in Major League Baseball (MLB) as an outfielder for the Philadelphia Athletics from 1923 to 1929. He won the 1929 World Series with the Athletics.

Aside from baseball, he also played football for the Rochester Jeffersons and the Pottsville Maroons of the National Football League (NFL). French was instrumental in helping the Maroons win the 1925 NFL Championship, before it was stripped from the team due to a rules violation.

== High school and college career ==
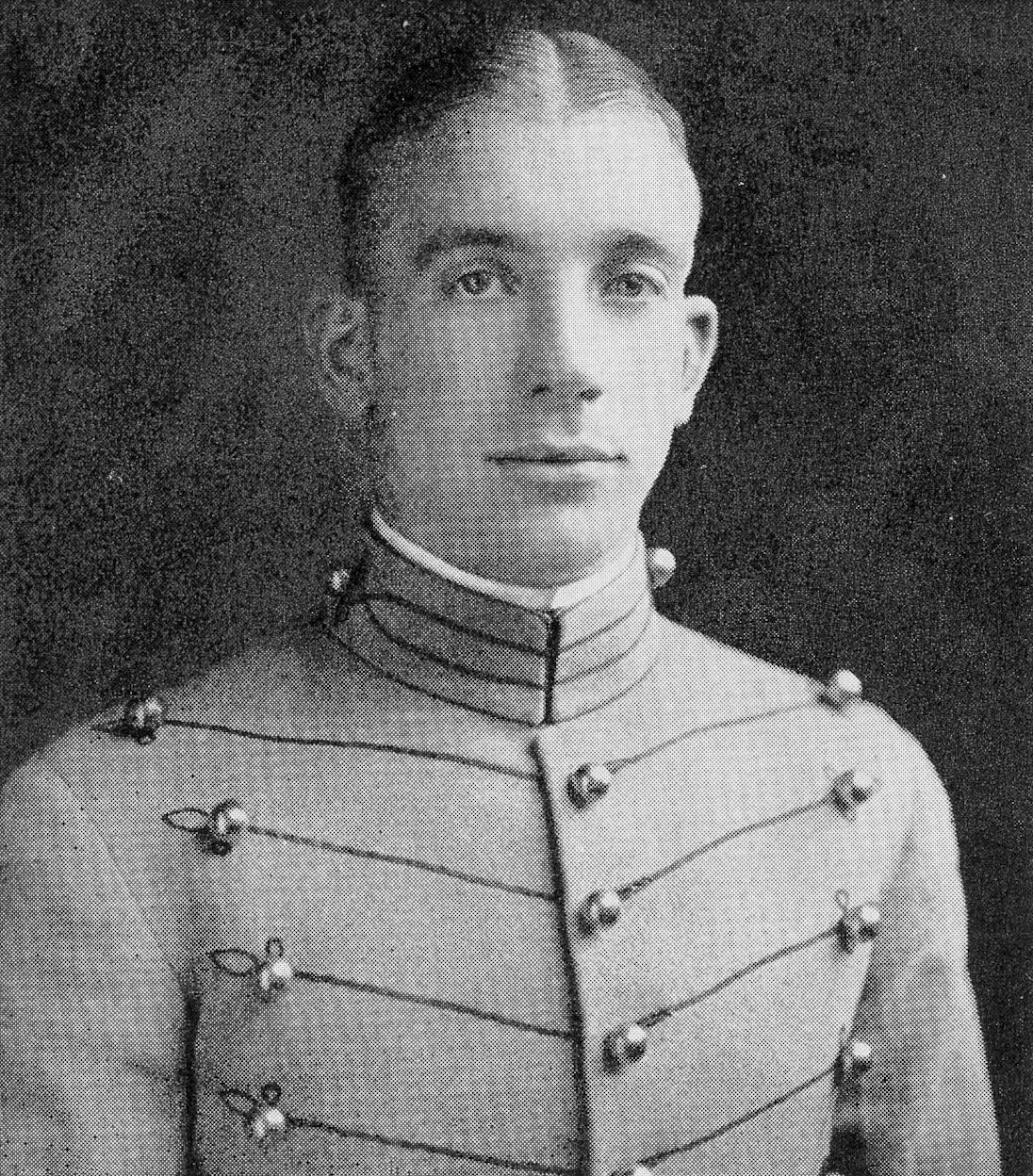
As a West Point cadet

Born and raised in Moorestown, New Jersey, French attended Moorestown High School, the local public high school, before transferring to The Pennington School for his senior year.

From 1920 to 1921, French attended the United States Military Academy and lettered in baseball and basketball. He also won All-American football honors during his time at the academy. However, he did not graduate from West Point and left the academy in the fall of 1922.

== Professional sports career ==
=== MLB career ===
The spring of 1923, French signed with the Philadelphia Athletics, managed by Connie Mack. He was first sent down to the minor leagues to gain some professional baseball experience, however he was called up that fall and played 6 years with the Athletics as a substitute outfielder and pinch hitter. He had a .303 career batting average in the majors and made a brief appearance in the 1929 World Series against the Chicago Cubs. In 1925 he batted .370 in 67 games for the Athletics and was the top pinch hitter in the majors. Throughout his career, French also played baseball several years in the high minors, leading the Southern Association three years in hits, 1931–33. He was a good bunter and a very fast runner. Until the 2017 debut of Chris Rowley, French was the only alumnus from West Point to play in the majors.

In a six-year major league career spanning 397 games, French posted a .303 batting average (297-for-981) with 142 runs, 2 home runs and 109 RBI. He recorded a .968 fielding percentage as an outfielder.

=== NFL career ===
French did not give up on football, however, playing with the powerful Pottsville Maroons in the NFL in 1925. That season, he led the NFL by averaging 5.4 yards per carry.

== Post-career ==
In 1936 he went back to the United States Military Academy to coach baseball and served as the Academy baseball team's coach from 1937 to 1942. At the start of World War II he went on active duty with the United States Army as a reserve officer. After the war, French continued on active duty in the United States Air Force.

He retired in late 1959 as a Lieutenant colonel and took up residence near San Jose, California. French suffered a heart attack in 1972, however his health held up and he still kept in shape by playing golf three days a week. He died on May 8, 1984.

He was the last surviving member of the 1929 World Champion Philadelphia Athletics.
