= Eddie Doyle (American football) =

American football player (1898–1942)

No. 15, 1
- Position: End

Personal information
- Born: October 17, 1898; New York City, New York, U.S.
- Died: November 8, 1942 (aged 44); French Morocco †
- Listed height: 5 ft 9 in (1.75 m)
- Listed weight: 173 lb (78 kg)

Career information
- College: Army

Career history
- 1924: Frankford Yellow Jackets
- 1925: Pottsville Maroons

Other information
- Military career
- Allegiance: United States
- Branch: U.S. Army
- Service years: 1942
- Rank: Captain
- Conflicts: World War II: North African Campaign; Operation Torch (DOW)

Edward James Doyle (August 17, 1898 – October 8, 1942) was a professional football player who played in the National Football League (NFL) from 1924 to 1925 with the Frankford Yellow Jackets and the Pottsville Maroons. During his two-year NFL career, Doyle scored three touchdowns. He also helped Pottsville win the 1925 NFL Championship, before it was stripped from the team due to a disputed rules violation.

A graduate of the United States Military Academy, Doyle later fought in World War II, after the United States entry into the war, in 1942. He received the rank of captain and was sent to fight in North Africa. Captain Doyle was fatally shot by a sniper in the Allied troop landings of the North African Campaign. He is believed to have been the first American killed in North Africa during the war. Doyle's name is included in a football's wartime heroes display at the Pro Football Hall of Fame in Canton, Ohio.

Doyle wore the jersey numbers 15, during his time with the Frankford Yellow Jackets and number 1 with the Pottsville Maroons.
