= Jack Ernst =

American football player (1899–1968)

Profile
- Positions: Halfback, Quarterback

Personal information
- Born: December 4, 1899; Llewellyn, Pennsylvania, U.S.
- Died: March 9, 1968 (aged 68); Williamsport, Pennsylvania, U.S.
- Listed height: 5 ft 11 in (1.80 m)
- Listed weight: 180 lb (82 kg)

Career information
- College: Lafayette

Career history
- 1925–1928: Pottsville Maroons
- 1928: New York Yankees
- 1929: Boston Bulldogs
- 1930: Frankford Yellow Jackets

Awards and highlights
- Disputed NFL champion (1925)
- Stats at Pro Football Reference

John Oliver Ernst (December 4, 1899 – March 9, 1968) was an American football running back. He played six seasons for the Pottsville Maroons, New York Yankees, Boston Bulldogs, and Frankford Yellow Jackets. In 1925 Jack helped the Maroons win the NFL Championship, before it was stripped from the team due to a disputed rules violation.
