= Russ Hathaway =

American football player (1896–1988)

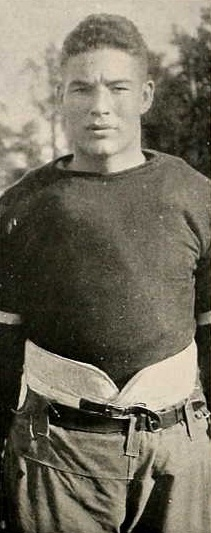
- Hathaway from The Arbutus 1917

Profile
- Positions: Tackle, guard, kicker

Personal information
- Born: January 14, 1896; Terre Haute, Indiana, U.S.
- Died: August 19, 1988 (aged 92); Clay City, Indiana, U.S.
- Listed height: 5 ft 11 in (1.80 m)
- Listed weight: 238 lb (108 kg)

Career information
- College: Indiana

Career history
- 1920: Muncie Flyers
- 1920–1922: Dayton Triangles
- 1922: Canton Bulldogs
- 1923–1924: Dayton Triangles
- 1925–1926: Pottsville Maroons
- 1927: Buffalo Bisons

Awards and highlights
- NFL champion (1922); Disputed NFL champion (1925); George Halas: 2nd team all-NFL (1922); Canton Daily News: 1st team all-NFL (1923); GB Press-Gazette: 2nd team all-NFL (1923)

Career statistics
- Games played: 64
- Starts: 52
- Field goals: 10
- Extra points: 28; Other stats incomplete

Russell Grant Hathaway (January 14, 1896 – August 19, 1988) was an American professional football player for eight seasons in the early National Football League (NFL) for the Muncie Flyers, Dayton Triangles, Pottsville Maroons and Buffalo Bisons.

== Biography ==
A native of Terre Haute, Indiana, Hathaway attended Indiana University. In November 1917 Hathaway made a 27-yard field goal early in the fourth quarter for the Hoosiers only points that game. However, it was the first score ever made against Ohio State that season.

Hathaway made his National Football League debut in 1920 with the Muncie Flyers. In 1922, Hathaway led the NFL with 9 extra points. Also in 1922 he helped the Canton Bulldogs win the 1922 NFL Championship. In 1925 he and the Pottsville Maroons won the 1925 NFL Championship, before the title was stripped from the team due to a still-disputed rules violation. He later said that during his time with Pottsville, he was receiving $100 for playing in just one game, while the local miners working there did not make that in a month.
