= Shenandoah Yellow Jackets =

American minor-league football team active from 1923-1924

The Shenandoah Yellow Jackets were an Anthracite League football team that played during the league's two years of existence in the 1923 and 1924 football seasons.

They played twelve games in the 1923 football season finishing the season with five wins, six losses and a tie. Their actual league record was three wins, three losses and a tie as the other wins and losses were with teams outside the Anthracite Football League. Nevertheless they still finished third in the overall league standings with a tally of 24 points scored for to 26 points against.

The Yellow Jackets returned for the 1924 football season to complete eight games, going 4–4 for a .500 winning percentage, but two of those games were non league related, giving the Yellowjackets three wins, three losses and no ties, with a points tally of 27 points scored for and 30 points against. They finished second behind the leading Pottsville Maroons with six wins, no losses and a tie in the five-team league.
