= Jim Flower (American football) =

American football player (1895–1956)

Profile
- Position: Offensive lineman

Personal information
- Born: October 17, 1895; Akron, OH, United States
- Died: May 6, 1956 (aged 60); Fremont, OH United States

Career information
- College: Ohio State

Career history
- 1920: Columbus Panhandles
- 1921–1925: Akron Pros

Awards and highlights
- Second-team All-Pro (1922)

James Tod Flower Jr. (October 17, 1895 – May 6, 1956) was a professional football player with the Columbus Panhandles and the Akron Pros of the American Professional Football Association (renamed the National Football League in 1922). He also served as a player-coach for the Pros in 1924, guiding the team to a 2–6 record.

Before he joined the NFL, Jim played college football and basketball at Ohio State. In 1919, Flower recovered a blocked Michigan punt in the end zone for a touchdown in a 13-3 Buckeyes win.
