= Johnny Kyle =

American football player (1898–1974)

Profile
- Position: Fullback

Personal information
- Born: September 12, 1898; Gary, Indiana, U.S.
- Died: May 25, 1974 (aged 75); Valparaiso, Indiana, U.S.
- Listed height: 5 ft 9 in (1.75 m)
- Listed weight: 190 lb (86 kg)

Career information
- High school: Emerson (IN)
- College: Indiana

Career history

Playing
- Cleveland Indians (1923)

Coaching
- Froebel HS (IN) (1922–1931) Head coach; Froebel HS (IN) (1934–1952) Head coach

Operations
- Froebel HS (IN) (1955–1966) Athletic director

Awards and highlights
- Third-team All-Pro (1923)
- Stats at Pro Football Reference

John William Kyle (September 12, 1898 – May 25, 1974), was an American football player. A native of Gary, Indiana, he played college football for Indiana University. He also played professional football in the National Football League (NFL) as a fullback for the Cleveland Indians in 1923. He was selected by a poll of newspaper reporters in NFL cities as the third-team fullback on the 1923 All-Pro Team. He was the football coach at Gary Froebel High School for many years. He became director of physical education for the Gary school system in 1952 and athletic director from 1955 to 1966. He died in 1974 at age 75 in a nursing home in Valparaiso, Indiana.
