= Bob Rapp =

American football player (1898–1968)

Profile
- Positions: Halfback, quarterback

Personal information
- Born: February 18, 1898; Columbus, Ohio, U.S.
- Died: February 1, 1968 (aged 69); Columbus, Ohio, U.S.
- Listed height: 5 ft 8 in (1.73 m)
- Listed weight: 159 lb (72 kg)

Career information
- College: Davis & Elkins

Career history
- Columbus Panhandles (1922); Columbus Tigers (1923–1926); Buffalo Bisons (1929)

Joseph Robert Rapp (February 18, 1898 – February 1, 1968) was an American football player. He played at the halfback and quarterback positions in the National Football League (NFL) for the Columbus Panhandles (1922), Columbus Tigers (1923–1926), and Buffalo Bisons (1929). He appeared in 43 NFL games, 35 as a starter. He was selected by the Canton Daily News as a first-team halfback on the 1923 All-Pro Team. He was also the leading scorer in the NFL during one of his seasons at Columbus. On October 26, 1924, he returned the opening kickoff 94 yards for a touchdown.
