= Wilkes-Barre Barons (football) =

The Wilkes-Barre Barons (also known as the Panthers) were an Anthracite League American football team that, according to historical records, played in only one game in the league's only year of existence, 1924.

Their lone game was played on October 5 against the Pottsville Maroons. The Barons were shut out in the contest 34-0.
