= Pete Henry =

American football player (1897–1952)

- Henry, c. 1920

No. 27, 18, 28, 20, 13, 55, 23
- Positions: Tackle, kicker, punter

Personal information
- Born: October 31, 1897; Mansfield, Ohio, U.S.
- Died: February 7, 1952 (aged 54); Washington, Pennsylvania, U.S.
- Listed height: 5 ft 11 in (1.80 m)
- Listed weight: 245 lb (111 kg)

Career information
- High school: Mansfield (OH)
- College: Washington & Jefferson (1915–1919)

Career history

Playing
- Canton Bulldogs (1920–1923, 1925–1926); New York Giants (1927); Pottsville Maroons (1927–1928)

Coaching
- Canton Bulldogs (1926) Head coach; Pottsville Maroons (1928) Head coach; Washington & Jefferson (1929) Freshman coach; Washington & Jefferson (1930–1933) Line coach; Washington & Jefferson (1942, 1945) Head coach

Operations
- Washington & Jefferson (1932–1952) Athletic director

Awards and highlights
- 2× NFL champion (1922, 1923); 4× First-team All-Pro (1920–1923); NFL 1920s All-Decade Team; 2× Consensus All-American (1918, 1919); First-team All-American (1917)

Head coaching record
- Regular season: 3–17–3 (.196)
- Coaching profile at Pro Football Reference
- Stats at Pro Football Reference
- Pro Football Hall of Fame
- College Football Hall of Fame

Wilbur Francis "Pete" Henry (October 31, 1897 – February 7, 1952) was an American football player, coach, and athletic administrator. He was a charter inductee into both the College Football Hall of Fame in 1951 and the Pro Football Hall of Fame in 1963.

A native of Mansfield, Ohio, Henry attended Washington & Jefferson College where he played at the tackle position from 1915 to 1919. He was selected as a consensus All-American in 1918 and again in 1919.

He next played professional football in the National Football League (NFL) for the Canton Bulldogs (1920–1923, 1925–1926), New York Giants (1927), and Pottsville Maroons (1927–1928). He helped lead Canton to consecutive NFL championships in 1922 and 1923 and was selected as a first-team All-Pro four consecutive years from 1920 to 1923. He also served as head coach with Canton in 1926 and with Pottsville in 1928.

In 1929, Henry returned to Washington & Jefferson as an assistant football coach. He became athletic director in 1932 and held that position until his death in 1952. He was also the head coach of the Washington & Jefferson football team in 1942 and 1945.

== Early life ==
Henry was born in 1897 in Mansfield, Ohio. He was the only child of Ulysses Sherman Henry (1865–1938), an Ohio native who worked for 32 years as a guard in a reformatory, and Bertha Frank Henry, an immigrant from Germany.

Henry attended Mansfield Senior High School where he played football both as a lineman and fullback from 1911 to 1914. As the team captain and starting fullback in 1914, Henry was effective as a lead blocker and passer out of a single-wing offense and led the team to an 8–1 record. That year, he also returned a fumble 50 yards for a touchdown and scored three touchdowns in one game.

== College career ==
In 1915, Henry enrolled at Washington & Jefferson College located approximately 30 miles southwest of Pittsburgh. He played football for the Washington & Jefferson Presidents football team for five years from 1915 to 1919 (the 1918 season was not counted against Henry's four years of eligibility due to his military service). During Henry's time with Washington & Jefferson, the football team compiled a 31–10–1 record.

Washington & Jefferson head coach Bob Folwell switched Henry in 1915 from a fullback to a tackle, the position he played for his entire college and professional career. The 1915 Washington & Jefferson football team compiled an 8–1–1 record, defeated Yale (which had won the national championship as recently as 1909) by a 17–0 score, and outscored all opponents, 219–45.

Henry became known as one of the best punt blockers in the game while playing for Washington & Jefferson. Years later, he cited a blocked punt in 1916 as his greatest thrill as a player. Taking the ball off the punter's toe and running it back 40 yards for a touchdown, Henry recalled: "The ball plopped right against my stomach and never bounced as I threw my arms around it."

Henry was recognized by the Frank Menke Syndicate as a first-term All-American at tackle in 1917. In both 1918 and 1919, he was recognized as a consensus first-team All-American.

In 1919, Pitt argued that Henry was ineligible to play a fifth year. A gentleman's agreement among all college teams generally allowed players whose 1918 seasons were cut short to play. In fact, Pitt played several other teams with similarly situated players without complaint. Henry agreed to sit out the game, and Pitt won, 7–6. Washington & Jefferson fans circulated flyers at the game that said, "Who Scared Pitt?" on the front with a mug shot and one word, "Henry", on the back. In his later years, Henry was not one to keep souvenirs, but he did keep the program from that game.

In 1920, Pop Warner, who had coached against Henry at Pitt, selected Henry as one of the two tackles on his greatest collegiate eleven of all time and said: "Henry was the fastest and most aggressive big man I ever saw."

Henry also played basketball for W&J and competed in weights events for the Washington & Jefferson track team. He also later played professional basketball for the Warren Trumbull Steels, Canton Sinclair Oils, and Dover All-Stars.

== Professional playing career ==
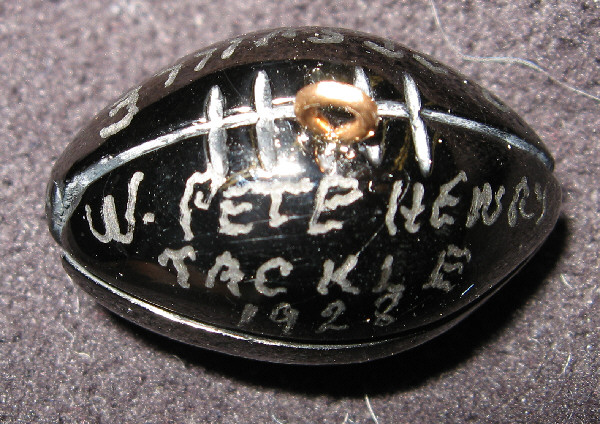
Henry's small charm made from anthracite coal given to members of the 1928 Pottsville Maroons

=== Canton Bulldogs (1920–1923) ===
Upon graduating from college in 1920, Henry was 5 feet, 11 inches and weighed 235 pounds, but was "considered a fast man, able to do the hundred in close to 11 seconds." He received offers to play professional football for the Canton Bulldogs, Cleveland Tigers, Akron Pros, Hammond Pros, and Rock Island Independents. He signed with Canton in September 1920, saying he wished to play with Jim Thorpe.

As a rookie, Henry participated in the first season of the new professional association that became the NFL. He played all 13 games for the 1920 Bulldogs team that compiled a 7–4–2 record. At the end of the 1920 season, Henry was selected as a first-team tackle on the All-Pro team selected by sportswriters Bruce Copeland (Rock Island Argus).

In 1921, Henry again played every game for the Bulldogs team that compiled an 8–3–3 record. Henry was selected as a first-team All-Pro team compiled by the Buffalo Evening News.

In 1922, Guy Chamberlin joined the Canton team as player, coach, and part owner and built the Bulldogs into one of the NFL's first powerhouse teams. The 1922 Bulldogs team included Pro Football Hall of Famers (Henry, Chamberlin, and Link Lyman), compiled a 10–0–2 record, shut out nine of twelve opponents, outscored all opponents 184–15, and won the 1922 NFL championship.

The following year, the 1923 Canton Bulldogs with Henry and Chamberlin compiled another undefeated season (11–0–1), shut out eight of twelve opponents, outscored all opponents by a combined total of 246–19, and won its second consecutive NFL championship. Henry led the 1923 team with 58 points on nine field goals, 25 extra points, and a touchdown reception. On October 23, 1923, he set an NFL record with a 94-yard punt; his record stood until 1969. On November 11, 1923, with the Bulldogs trailing to Buffalo by a 3–0 score and a half minute left in the game, Henry blocked a Tommy Hughitt punt and then drop-kicked a field goal to preserve Canton's undefeated season. At the end of the 1923 season, Henry was selected by Collyer's Eye magazine, the Green Bay Press-Gazette, and the Canton Daily News as a first-team player on the 1923 All-Pro Team.

=== Pottsville Maroons (1924) ===
In August 1924, Cleveland jeweler Samuel Deutsch bought the Canton Bulldogs and moved the team to Cleveland where they became the Cleveland Bulldogs during the 1924 NFL season. Henry did not join the Bulldogs in Cleveland, instead playing for the 1924 Pottsville Maroons of the Anthracite League. (Pottsville in the 1920s was a city with a population of approximately 22,000 located 100 miles northwest of Philadelphia.) Henry led Pottsville to a 12–1–1 record and the Anthracite League championship and was named to the All-Anthracite team at the end of the 1924 season.

=== Canton Bulldogs (1925–1926) ===
In January 1925, Henry was reinstated to good standing with the NFL, having been subjected to sanctions the previous year when he refused to join the Bulldogs when the team moved to Cleveland. In the summer of 1925, Henry and four other Canton alumni (Link Lyman, Rudy Comstock, Ben Jones, and Harry Robb) bought the Cleveland Bulldogs for $3,500 and moved the team back to Canton. Henry appeared in only six games for the 1925 Canton team, missing much of the season due to injury. The following year, he appeared in all 13 games and served as co-head coach with Harry Robb of the 1926 Canton team that compiled a 1–9–3 record.

=== New York and Pottsville (1927–1928) ===
Before the 1927 season, the NFL dropped 12 teams, including Canton. In September 1927, Henry signed to play with the New York Giants. He appeared in only four games for the Giants. In mid-October 1927, he was acquired by the Pottsville Maroons (for whom he had played in 1924) in a transaction with the Giants. He remained with Pottsville through the 1928 season. He also served as head coach of the 1928 Pottsville team that compiled a 2–8 record against NFL opponents.

== Honors and awards ==
Henry received multiple honors and awards arising out of his accomplishments as a football player, including the following:

- In November 1928, John Heisman selected Henry for "Heisman's Hundred in Hall of Football Fame". Heisman cited Henry's "extraordinary" speed and called Henry "[b]eyond all question . . . the greatest punt blocker the game has ever known."
- In November 1931, a jury consisting of many of football's leading figures, including Pop Warner, Robert Zuppke, Gil Dobie, Hugo Bezdek, and Bill Roper, was tasked with selecting "Football's Greatest Player." Henry finished 16th in the voting.
- In November 1939, Grantland Rice included Henry as one of two tackles and eleven players on the All-Time All-America team he selected for Collier's magazine.
- In October 1951, Henry was inducted into the Helms Athletic Foundation's Professional Football Hall of Fame. He had previously been inducted into the Helms College Football Hall of Fame in 1949 and was the eighth player to be inducted into both the pro and college football hall of fame established by the Helms Foundation.
- In November 1951, Henry was one of 52 inaugural inductees into the National Football Foundation's Football Hall of Fame (later renamed the College Football Hall of Fame).
- In January 1963, Henry was selected as one of the 17 inaugural inductees into the Pro Football Hall of Fame.
- In 1969 the Football Writers Association of America named Henry to the pre-1920 squad of its 22-man College Football All-Time Team.
- In August 1969, Henry was named to the NFL 1920s All-Decade Team.
- In February 1971, Washington & Jefferson College dedicated its new multipurpose sports complex as the Henry Physical Education Center (later renamed Henry Memorial Center) in his honor.

== Coaching and administrative career ==
In June 1929, Henry was hired by his alma mater W&J as an advisory coach to the football team and head coach of the basketball and track teams. In the fall of 1929, Henry also coached W&J's freshman football team. He was promoted in July 1930 to assistant coach for W&J's varsity football team.

Henry became the school's athletic director in April 1932 while retaining his duties as line coach for the football team.

When Stu Holcomb resigned as W&J's head football coach in early 1942, Henry added the responsibility to his duties as athletic director. W&J President Ralph Cooper Hutchinson said at the time: "At this time, when football, along with other college activities, faces a crisis due to war conditions, the college has turned to Director Henry to serve in the emergency." W&J withdrew from intercollegiate for the 1943 and 1944 seasons due to wartime conditions. When football resumed in 1945, Henry again served as the team's head coach. In January 1946, Henry stepped down as head coach with the hiring of Henry Leucht to take over those responsibilities.

Henry continued to serve as W&J's athletic director until his death in 1952.

== Family and death ==
Henry was married in September 1927 to Marie M. Floding of Canton, Ohio. He met his wife after he was hospitalized with a football injury, and she was assigned as his nurse.

In his later years, Henry developed diabetes which limited his circulation. In January 1949, he had his right leg amputated to treat a gangrenous infection that developed in a toe. He died in 1952 at age 54 at his home in Washington, Pennsylvania. The cause of death was sepsis due to gangrene in his left foot and diabetes mellitus. He was buried at Mansfield Cemetery in Mansfield, Ohio.

Henry was eulogized in Washington & Jefferson's college newspaper, the Red & Black, as "capturing the very spirit of Wash Jeff and, for many people was the College."
