= Herb Stein =

American football player (1898–1980)

- Stein with the Pitt Panthers in 1920

No. 4, 28, 20
- Positions: Center, guard

Personal information
- Born: March 27, 1898; Warren, Ohio, U.S.
- Died: October 25, 1980 (aged 82); Strongsville, Ohio, U.S.
- Listed height: 6 ft 1 in (1.85 m)
- Listed weight: 186 lb (84 kg)

Career information
- High school: Niles McKinley High School, The Kiski School
- College: Pittsburgh

Career history
- Buffalo All-Americans (1921); Toledo Maroons (1922–1923); Frankford Yellow Jackets (1924); Pottsville Maroons (1925–1928)

Awards and highlights
- National champion (1918); 2× Consensus All-American (1920, 1921); Disputed NFL champion (1925); Canton Daily News: 1st team All-NFL (1922); George Halas: 1st team All-NFL (1922); Colliers Eye Mag.: 2nd team All-NFL (1924); GB Press-Gazette: 2nd team all-NFL (1926)
- Stats at Pro Football Reference
- College Football Hall of Fame

Herbert Alfred Stein (March 27, 1898 – October 25, 1980) was an American football player. He later made his professional debut in the National Football League (NFL) in 1922 with the Buffalo All-Americans. He played for Buffalo, Toledo Maroons, Frankford Yellow Jackets, and the Pottsville Maroons over the course of his six-year career. Herb later joined his brother, Russ as a member of the 1925 Pottsville Maroons team that won the 1925 NFL Championship, before it was stripped from the team due to a disputed rules violation.

He grew up in Warren, Ohio and attended high school at Niles McKinley High School and later The Kiski School, located in Saltsburg, Pennsylvania. After high school, Stein attended the University of Pittsburgh and served as the team's center from 1918 until 1921. He was a consensus All-American for Pitt in both his junior and senior years and served as the team captain in 1920. He was often regarded as one of the team's greatest offensive and defensive centers. His efforts at Pitt earned him induction into the College Football Hall of Fame in 1967.
