= Harry Robb =

American football player and coach (1897–1971)

Profile
- Positions: Halfback, Fullback, Quarterback

Personal information
- Born: May 11, 1897; Pitcairn, Pennsylvania, U.S.
- Died: December 15, 1971 (aged 74); Greenville, Pennsylvania, U.S.

Career information
- High school: Peabody High School
- College: Penn State, Columbia

Career history

Playing
- 1921–1923: Canton Bulldogs
- 1921: Philadelphia Union Quakers
- 1924: Pottsville Maroons
- 1925–1926: Canton Bulldogs
- 1927–1928: Pottsville Maroons

Coaching
- 1920–1921: Catholic University
- 1925–1926: Canton Bulldogs

Awards and highlights
- 2x NFL champion (1922, 1923); First-team All-Pro (1923); 2× Canton Daily News, 1st team all-NFL (1922, 1923); Anthracite League champion (1924); Colliers Magazine, 2nd team all-NFL (1923); Green Bay Press-Gazette, 2nd team all-NFL (1923); NFL coaching record: 5–13; Most points (36) scored by a Penn State player in a single game (1916); All-AEF team
- Coaching profile at Pro Football Reference

Other information
- Military career
- Allegiance: United States
- Branch: U.S. Army
- Service years: 1917–1918
- Rank: Second lieutenant
- Unit: 79th Infantry Division
- Conflicts: World War I Western Front

Harry Duplein Robb (May 11, 1897 – December 15, 1971) was an American football player and coach during the 1920s.

== Biography ==
=== College and military ===
Robb was born in Pitcairn, Pennsylvania and attended Peabody High School in Pittsburgh. Upon his high school graduation, he attended college at both Penn State University and Columbia University. Playing the positions of halfback, fullback and quarterback, Robb was a standout in football at the college level. In 1916, he scored 36 points for the Nittany Lions against Gettysburg College, establishing the record for most points scored in a game by a Penn State player.

He was elected captain of the Penn State football team in 1917, however he enlisted in the US Army instead, serving as a lieutenant during World War I. He was again elected to captain the 1918 Penn State team, however after receiving his commission as a lieutenant his college career moved him to Columbia University, where he played end. During the war, he was stationed with the 79th Infantry Division in France. However, he still played football for the 79th Division and was selected for the All-AEF team. He rejoined Penn State in 1919.

=== Professional career ===
Robb made his professional debut in 1921, in the American Professional Football League (which was renamed the National Football League in 1922) with the Canton Bulldogs, playing alongside football legend Jim Thorpe. At Canton, he helped the Bulldogs win back-to-back NFL Championships in 1922 and 1923. In 1924, the Pottsville Maroons of Pennsylvania's Anthracite League signed Robb for their season which resulted in the Maroons winning the Anthracite League Championship. He then returned to Canton and coached the Bulldogs for two seasons beginning in 1925. He then returned to the field as a player, signing with the Pottsville Maroons, who were now members of the National Football League, playing alongside football greats Johnny Blood and Pete Henry. Robb remained with Pottsville until the team relocated to Boston in 1929.

Robb's whereabouts after 1928 are only speculative, but it is possible that he took up coaching outside of professional football. He was an official (umpire) in the 1947 NFL championship game between the Cardinals and Eagles. In 1962, he donated a wool Canton Bulldogs warm-up sideline jacket from the early 1920s to the Pro Football Hall of Fame. In 1963, Robb represented his former teammate, Wilbur Henry, as Henry was inducted into the Pro Football Hall of Fame.

== Death ==
Robb died on December 15, 1971, at his home in Greenville, Pennsylvania, where he had moved recently from Mt. Lebanon, Pennsylvania. The cause of death was a shotgun wound to the chest, which was ruled a suicide.

== Head coaching record ==
=== College ===
Year	Team	Overall	Conference	Standing	Bowl/playoffs
Catholic University Cardinals (South Atlantic Intercollegiate Athletic Association) (1920–1921)
1920	Catholic University	3–5	1–3	10th	
1921	Catholic University	3–5	2–2	T–7th	
Catholic:		6–10	3–5		
Total:		6–10			
