= Larry Conover =

American football player and coach (1894–1945)

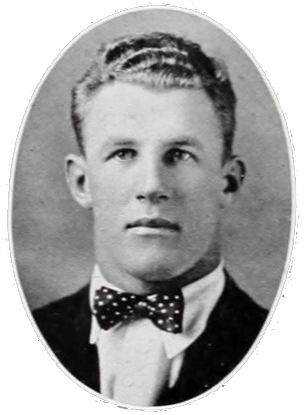
- Conover in 1921

Profile
- Position: Center

Personal information
- Born: May 21, 1894; Atlantic City, New Jersey, U.S.
- Died: August 4, 1945 (aged 51); Atlantic City, New Jersey, U.S.
- Listed height: 5 ft 10 in (1.78 m)
- Listed weight: 190 lb (86 kg)

Career information
- College: Penn State

Career history
- 1921–1923: Canton Bulldogs
- 1924: Pottsville Maroons
- 1925: Cleveland Bulldogs
- 1926: Frankford Yellow Jackets

Awards and highlights
- Canton Daily News: 1st team all-NFL (1923); GB Press-Gazette: 2nd team all-NFL (1923); Anthracite League champion (1924)

Larner Somers Gardner Conover (May 21, 1894 – August 4, 1945) was an American professional football player during the early years of the National Football League (NFL). After attending high school in Atlantic City, New Jersey, Conover attended Penn State University, where he served as the team's captain in 1917. Conover was the head basketball and baseball coach and an assistant football coach at Clemson for the 1920–21 seasons.

Nicknamed "The Atlantic City Airedale", Conovar made his professional debut in the NFL in 1921 with the Canton Bulldogs. Conover played in the league for four years, playing for the Cleveland Bulldogs, Frankford Yellow Jackets and Canton. In 1922, Conover signed on to play with the then-independent, Pottsville Maroons. There he helped the Maroons become the top team in the Pennsylvania coal region. In 1924, the Maroons won the Anthracite League championship. The following year, the Maroons joined the NFL.

Conover later served as a line coach at the University of Georgia and as an assistant football coach his alma mater, Penn State, from 1926 to 1932. He died on August 4, 1945, in Atlantic City, New Jersey, from a heart attack after attempting to revive a drowned swimmer.
