= Ben Jones (halfback) =

American football player (1899–1929)

Profile
- Positions: Fullback, halfback, wingback

Personal information
- Born: March 18, 1899; Bloomsburg, Pennsylvania, U.S.
- Died: May 17, 1929 (aged 30); Grove City, Pennsylvania, U.S.
- Listed height: 5 ft 11 in (1.80 m)
- Listed weight: 205 lb (93 kg)

Career information
- High school: DuBois (DuBois, Pennsylvania)
- College: Grove City

Career history
- Canton Bulldogs (1923); Cleveland Bulldogs (1924); Frankford Yellow Jackets (1925–1926); Canton Bulldogs (1926); Chicago Cardinals (1927–1928)

Awards and highlights
- 3× NFL champion (1923, 1924, 1926); All-NFL Canton Daily News (1923)
- Stats at Pro Football Reference

Benjamin Franklin Hanser Jones (March 18, 1899 – May 17, 1929) was an American professional football player during the early years of the National Football League (NFL). Jones won an NFL championship with the Canton Bulldogs in 1923, one with the Cleveland Bulldogs in 1924, and another with the Frankford Yellow Jackets in 1926. He finished his career with the Chicago Cardinals in 1928. Jones died on May 17, 1929, at the age of 30. The cause of death was due to gas inhalation after he was exposed to an explosion at a clinic, located in Cleveland, Ohio, on May 15, 1929.

According to a front-page article in the Simpson Times Leader in Ford City, Pennsylvania, on May 22, 1929, Jim Thorpe, the former All-American football player, attended his funeral. Jones is buried at Woodland Cemetery, located in Grove City, Pennsylvania.
