= Pottsville Maroons =

1920s American football team

Pottsville Maroons Boston Bulldogs
Logo

General information
- Founded: 1920
- Folded: 1929
- Stadium: Minersville Park (1920–1928); Braves Field (1929)
- Headquartered: Pottsville, Pennsylvania (1920–1928); Boston, Massachusetts (1929)
- Colors: Maroon, gold, white

Personnel
- Owners: Yorkville Hose Company (1920–1922); Kingsbury, Heinz & Schoeneman (1923); John G. Streigel (1924–1928); George Kenneally (1929)
- Head coach: Dick Rauch (1925–1927, 1929); Pete Henry (1928)

Team history
- Pottsville Eleven (1920–1924); Pottsville Maroons (1924–1929); Boston Bulldogs (1929)

League / conference affiliations
- Independent (1920–1923); Anthracite League (1924); National Football League (1925–1929)

Championships
- League championships: 2: Anthracite League championships (1) 1924; NFL championships (pre-1970 AFL–NFL merger) (1) 1925 (claimed by Pottsville, not recognized by NFL)

The Pottsville Maroons were an American football team based in Pottsville, Pennsylvania, in the northeastern part of the state. Founded in 1920, they played in the National Football League (NFL) from 1925 to 1928. In 1929 they relocated to Boston, where they played one season as the Boston Bulldogs.

The team was founded as the Pottsville Eleven, an independent team playing in the local eastern Pennsylvania circuit. Home games were played at Minersville Park, a high school stadium in nearby Minersville. They joined the local Anthracite League in 1924, the same year they adopted the "Maroons" nickname, and won the league title. The next season they joined the NFL under owner John G. Streigel. Though dominant on the field, a controversial suspension cost them the 1925 NFL Championship. They were reinstated the following year, but after two successive losing seasons in 1927 and 1928, Streigel sold the Maroons to a group in Boston, where they played one season before folding.

1925 was their best season. The 1928 roster included three future Pro Football Hall of Fame members – Johnny Blood, Walt Kiesling, and coach Wilbur "Pete" Henry – but posted the worst record in franchise history. Writer John O'Hara, who would go on to become a world-famous novelist with Appointment in Samarra, covered the team for the local newspaper, the Pottsville Republican.

== History ==
=== Origins ===
Like other coal towns in eastern Pennsylvania, Pottsville had been fielding football teams from at least the 1910s. The team that became the Maroons was established in 1920 as the Pottsville Eleven, and had a roster mostly made up of firemen from the Yorkville Hose Company. The team was initially unaffiliated with any league, playing on the independent circuit against other teams from the coal mining towns of eastern Pennsylvania. In 1922 the team attracted the sponsorship of area businessmen Harold Kingsbury, Irvin Heinz and Frank Schoeneman, who brought in talented professional players such as Carl Beck, Benny Boynton and Stan Cofall. Still, the team maintained a strong local presence by recruiting many Pottsville natives to its roster. The result was a team with consistent winning records and strong crowds.

=== Anthracite League ===
In 1924 local surgeon John G. "Doc" Striegel purchased the Pottsville Eleven for $1,500. That year teams in the local circuit decided to form a league, which became known as the Anthracite League. This was also the year the team adopted the Maroons name; according to legend, the team placed an order for new football jerseys with local sporting goods supplier Joe Zacko, telling him that the color was not important. Zacko sent them twenty-five maroon jerseys, giving birth to the name.

During the 1924 Anthracite League season, the Maroons added three members of the NFL's 1923 Canton Bulldogs championship team to their roster. These players were Larry Conover, Harry Robb and future Hall of Fame inductee Wilbur "Pete" Henry. NFL President Joseph Carr was not pleased to see stars like Henry deserting the league to play for an independent coal region team, but there was little he could do about it unless Pottsville joined the league. A suit filed by Henry's former NFL team was thrown out on a technicality by a Pennsylvania judge. The Maroons then posted a 6–0–1 record against Anthracite League teams and clinched the league title that November with a victory over Coaldale.

Immediately after winning the Anthracite League title, the Maroons issued challenges to both the NFL champion Cleveland Bulldogs and the Frankford Yellow Jackets, who claimed the Eastern professional championship. When neither team accepted, Striegel scheduled a game with the NFL's Rochester Jeffersons, who had not beaten an NFL opponent since 1921. These two teams met in a season finale on the last Sunday of November. Rochester managed to defeat Pottsville 10–7, giving the Maroons their only loss of the season. However Pottsville ended its 1924 season with an overall record of 12–1–1, scoring 288 points and allowing only 17 while capturing the Anthracite League title.

== NFL ==
The Anthracite League collapsed after the season, but Striegel and the Maroons were undeterred. They applied for, and received, a franchise in the NFL. This was somewhat unusual, as the team's Minersville Park was a relatively small high school field; the league administration may have been attracted by the favorable logistics of a second team near the Frankford Yellow Jackets in Philadelphia. Pennsylvania's blue laws, which prohibited football on Sundays in Philadelphia, were simply not followed in Pottsville, allowing traveling teams to play the Yellowjackets on a Saturday and then head to Pottsville on Sunday.

Since many Maroons players moved back to their NFL teams in 1925, the Maroons recruited several players to replace them. These included former Army great Walter French and Jack Ernst, a quarterback from Lafayette College. Another Army recruit, end Eddie Doyle, later served in World War II and was the first American killed in the landings in North Africa. Another player that was added was Charlie Berry. Charlie Berry's athletic career at Lafayette College consisted of both baseball and football pro contracts however, this came with a down side as his contract was extremely expensive. Even with sold out games at Minersville Park it was difficult to pay for him.

"The Pottsville Maroons were the most ferocious and most respected players I have ever faced. "You know, I always believed the Maroons won the NFL championship in 1925 ... but were robbed of the honor."

— Red Grange, Pro Football Hall of Famer with the New York Yankees (NFL) and the Chicago Bears in 1954

During this time the Maroons insisted that their players live in the Pottsville area. During the 1920s most players had to travel great distances from their homes and only joined their teams on game day. By having the players live in Pottsville, coach and former Colgate University assistant Dick Rauch instituted regular practices for his players. This helped the Maroons to a 28–0 win over the Buffalo Bisons in their first NFL game. When not practicing, the Maroons spent their days hanging around the fire house, drinking Yuengling, playing cards and tossing footballs in the street. The Maroons then jumped out to a 9–1–1 record. However some believe that having visiting teams play Frankford the day before the Maroons benefited the team. Pottsville was 5–1–0 in their six games against teams that played the Yellow Jackets the previous day. On the first snap of the game against the Chicago Bears, the Pottsville players knocked football legend Red Grange out cold. Grange soon recovered from the hit, only to be knocked out again. Immediately Grange said "The hell with (the $500 owed to him for the one game), it ain't worth it." He then proceeded to walk off the field. The team's only loss in 1925 came from a 20–0 upset to the Yellow Jackets. However, in the second meeting of the two teams, the Maroons beat Frankford 49–0.

By this point in the season, Pottsville and the Chicago Cardinals (now the Arizona Cardinals) were the two top teams in the league, having comparable records. At the time, the NFL Championship went to the team with the best record against other NFL teams. As such, the match-up between the two was of great importance. The Maroons met the Cardinals in late November near the end of the season for a game at Chicago's Comiskey Park, under snowy conditions. The Maroons won the game 21–7, thereby putting them ahead of the Cardinals in the championship race.

=== 1925 NFL Championship controversy ===
With the 1925 season near its end, the Maroons had the best record and had defeated the rival Cardinals, essentially ensuring the NFL championship. Before the season ended, however, the Maroons were suspended by NFL commissioner Joseph Carr, thus denying them the championship title. This has been the subject of controversy ever since.

Earlier in the year, the Frankford Yellow Jackets had scheduled an exhibition game between a team of former University of Notre Dame stars and the best NFL team in the east. As the NFL's dominant eastern team at the time, they believed they themselves would get to play the potentially lucrative match against the "Notre Dame All-Stars". However, when Pottsville later pulled ahead in the standings, they won the right to play the All-Stars. As Pottsville's Minersville Park was a high school stadium with a capacity of only around 6,000, team owner John Streigel booked the much larger Shibe Park in Philadelphia for the big game. Philadelphia, though, was within the Yellow Jackets' designated territory, and Frankford complained to the league. Commissioner Carr warned Streigel several times that Pottsville's franchise would be suspended if they played in Philadelphia.

Not wanting to give up on a potential financial windfall for his team, Streigel went ahead with the game. He would later claim he had received verbal permission from the NFL by telephone, though he gave inconsistent responses as to which official he had spoken to. The Maroons won the game 9–7, which was considered a major win for professional football, but the match only attracted about 8,000 fans, a major financial disappointment. As threatened, Carr suspended Pottsville and removed them from the NFL, preventing them from finishing their schedule.

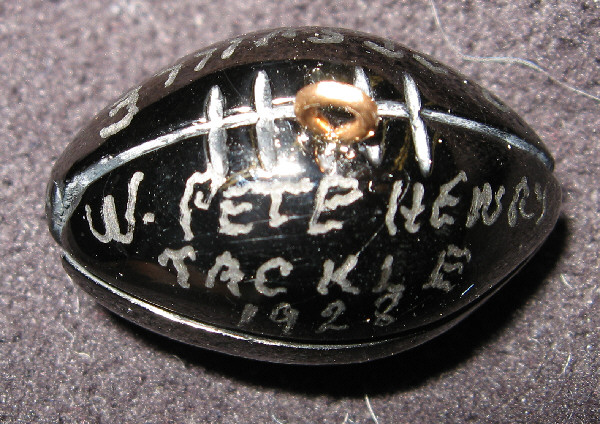
Pete Henry's 1928 Pottsville Anthracite Coal Charm

Meanwhile, Chicago Cardinals owner Chris O'Brien hastily scheduled two games against the Hammond Pros and the Milwaukee Badgers, both of whom had already disbanded for the season. O'Brien's intention appears not to have been to secure the championship, but to improve their record so as to entice the Chicago Bears and their star Red Grange into one last game. The game against the Badgers spurred a scandal of its own, when the Badgers filled out their roster with four high school players, in contravention of NFL rules. Both teams were sanctioned by the league. Regardless, with Pottsville out of the league, the Cardinals had the best record, and were awarded the championship by the league. For his part, O'Brien refused to accept the title, and afterward the league never officially awarded it at all. Later both the franchise and the NFL would claim the Cardinals as the 1925 champions. The Cardinals did not attempt to publicly take credit for the title until 1933, when it was acquired by Charles Bidwill whose descendants still own the modern-day franchise (since relocated to St. Louis and now Arizona). The Cardinals have won only one further NFL title, in 1947, leading to discussion that the franchise is "cursed" as a result of the debacle.

=== Return to the NFL ===
The NFL reinstated the Maroons the very next season. The league feared that the Maroons would jump to the threatening American Football League. In 1926 Red Grange and his manager C. C. Pyle wanted an NFL franchise in New York City. However, that move would have infringed on the territorial rights of the New York Giants. Pyle and Grange were turned down, so they decided to start their own league, the AFL. To keep independent teams from joining Grange's league, the NFL hastily expanded to 22 franchises. The Maroons were one of the teams added, or in this case reinstated. That year the Maroons were once again in the thick of title contention until late in the season. Pottsville's shutout victories over the Buffalo Rangers and Akron Indians led to the team finishing with a 10–2–1 record and third place in the final standings. 1926 also saw the signing of George Kenneally, a rookie out of St. Bonaventure University, who earned all-pro status and was named team captain in just his second season, and would later become part owner of the club.

However, towards the end of the season, the Maroons management struggled to meet its financial obligations, and there were published reports of a strike among the team's players.

The 1927 season saw a decline in the team's on-field performance. Pottsville lost several of its stars, and others were growing older, and finished the season with a disappointing 5–8–0 record. Doc Striegel relinquished operational control of the team for the 1928 season by "loaning" it to a group of three players: Herb Stein, Pete Henry and Duke Osborn. Henry took over the coaching reins but the downward spiral continued. The Maroons ended what turned out to be their final season in Pottsville with a dismal 2–8–0 record. At the end of the season the players were given a small football made of anthracite coal, a memento of the last season played in Pottsville.

== Boston Bulldogs ==
Following the 1928 season, the team relocated to Boston, where they played the 1929 season as the Boston Bulldogs.

Striegel sold the club during the offseason to a New England–based partnership that included Maroons' standout, George Kenneally. The new owners relocated the franchise to Boston prior to the 1929 season, where it was renamed the Bulldogs. The Bulldogs would be the first of a string of unsuccessful attempts at establishing an NFL team in Massachusetts, followed by the Boston Redskins in the 1930s (which relocated to Washington D.C. in 1937) and the Boston Yanks in the 1940s (which folded in 1948). It was not until 1970, when the American Football League's Patriots, (established in 1960) joined the NFL that the league were able to establish a permanent presence in New England's most populous market: in this regard, the Patriots required a hostile takeover to avoid being relocated in the 1990s.

Six veteran Maroons players made the move with the team. Dick Rauch also returned to the fold, resuming his position as head coach. Based at Boston's Braves Field, the Bulldogs nonetheless had a two-game swan song in their old stomping grounds, defeating both the Buffalo Bison on October 27 at Minersville Park and the Orange Tornadoes on October 29 at Mitchell Field. The team folded at season's end with a 4–4–0 record.

Because the Washington Redskins began in 1932 as the Boston Braves, some Pottsville backers, with help from a few writers, have suggested that the team descended from the Maroons by way of the Boston Bulldogs. The 1932 Boston franchise, however, had no relationship to the 1929 Bulldogs (that team instead descended from the Tornadoes, by way of the 1931 Cleveland Indians).

== Today ==
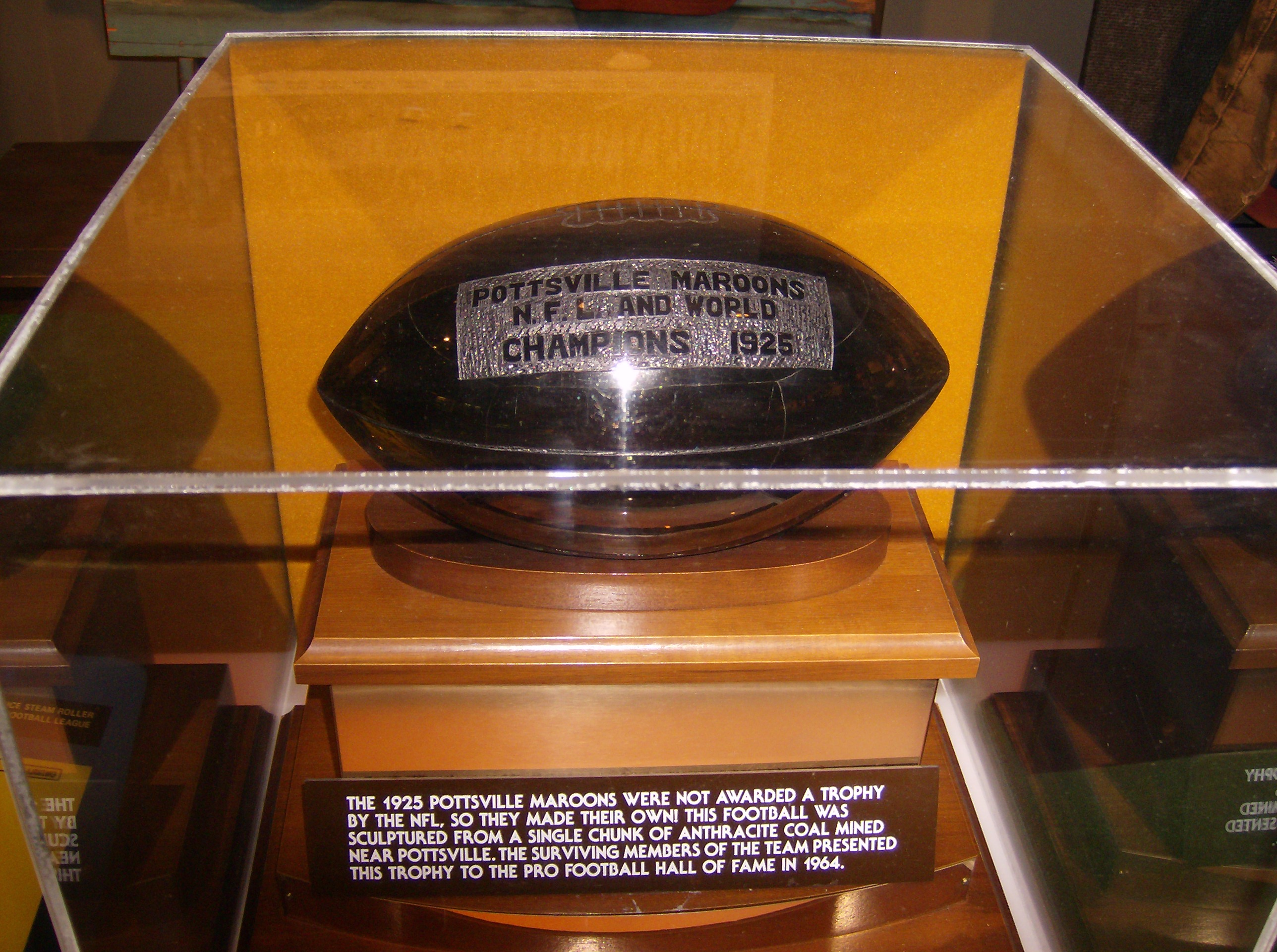
The Maroons' trophy (carved out of anthracite coal), made in 1925 and is now in the Pro Football Hall of Fame after being donated by surviving team members in 1964.

In 1963, the NFL created a special committee to investigate the 1925 controversy. The committee brought the Maroons' claim to a team owners meeting that year, where the owners voted 12–2 in favor of keeping the championship with the Cardinals. That same year, the surviving members of the Maroons donated their own championship trophy out of coal that they carved back in 1925, and presented it to the Pro Football Hall of Fame, where it can be seen today.

The 1925 Maroons have since been immortalized in Pottsville, where there are establishments bearing the team's name, including a section of U.S. Route 209 between Pottsville and Minersville named "Pottsville Maroons Highway" along with an inspirational picture of the 1925 "World Champion" team is displayed in the high school football team's locker room. There was also a bar named after the team, but it was closed in 2021

Today, the people of Pottsville still embrace the legacy of the Maroons. The town contains the headquarters of the Pottsville Maroons Memorial Committee, whose job it is to keep alive the spirit of Pottsville's only big-league sports franchise. In Pottsville, there was a major push led by Mayor John D.W. Reiley to restore the Maroons' 1925 title. The owner of a local embroidery shop still makes Maroons T-shirts and distributes them to residents and fans, along with the Schuylkill County Historical Society, which does the same.

In 2003, Governor of Pennsylvania Ed Rendell got involved in the Pottsville-NFL debate by enlisting city and borough councils across the state to lobby NFL owners to restore the Maroons' title. The NFL responded by holding a vote during at the October 2003 owners' meeting, where the team owners voted 30–2 not to reopen the case. Thus, the Cardinals are still listed as the 1925 NFL champions. Despite the long-time backing of Bears founder George Halas, Steelers founder Art Rooney and, more recently, Steelers chairman Dan Rooney, Philadelphia Eagles owner Jeff Lurie, the Pennsylvania General Assembly, and former commissioner Paul Tagliabue, the NFL's other owners, unsurprisingly led by the Cardinals, continue to oppose any reversal.

Rendell responded with an angry letter to Tagliabue, calling the NFL owners a group of "cowardly barons". Rendell berated the National Football League, and declared he would have no more communication with league officials until they granted the Pottsville Maroons the 1925 title. The governor ended the letter saying, "I am closing with the wish that every NFL franchise except for the Eagles and the Steelers lose large quantities of money". President of the United States George W. Bush also spoke on the subject. According to an article in ESPN the Magazine, Bush sent a handwritten note to ESPN calling the Maroons' case "illuminating."

In 2006 David Fleming authored the book Breaker Boys: The NFL's Greatest Team and the Stolen 1925 Championship.

In 2008, USA Today statistician Jeff Sagarin analyzed the two teams' statistics, including considerations for strength of schedule to determine which was the better team in 1925. The results showed the Maroons as the better team to the second-place Cardinals.

== Pro Football Hall of Famers ==
Pottsville Maroons Hall of Famers
Players
| No. | Name | Position | Tenure | Inducted |
|---|---|---|---|---|
| — | Johnny Blood | HB | 1928 | 1963 |
| — | Wilbur Henry | T | 1927–1928 | 1963 |
| — | Walt Kiesling | G/T | 1928 | 1966 |

== Season by season ==
| | Year | W | L | T | Finish | Coach |
|---|---|---|---|---|---|---|
| Pottsville Maroons | 1925 | 10 | 2 | 0 | expelled | Dick Rauch |
| Pottsville Maroons | 1926 | 10 | 2 | 2 | 3rd | Dick Rauch |
| Pottsville Maroons | 1927 | 5 | 8 | 0 | 8th | Dick Rauch |
| Pottsville Maroons | 1928 | 2 | 8 | 0 | 8th | Pete Henry |
| Boston Bulldogs | 1929 | 4 | 4 | 0 | 4th | Dick Rauch |
