= Anthracite League =

American former minor-league gridiron football league

- Sport: Football
- Founded: 1924
- Founder: James H. Gildea
- Folded: 1924
- No. of teams: 5
- Country: United States
- Last champion: Pottsville Maroons
- Most titles: Pottsville Maroons

The Anthracite League, also referred to as the Anthracite Association, was a short-lived American football minor league comprising teams based in coal-mining towns in eastern Pennsylvania (hence the league name's reference to anthracite coal). The league lasted for just one season before folding. The teams in the league were the Coaldale Big Green, Wilkes-Barre Barons, Shenandoah Yellow Jackets, Gilberton Cadamounts, and Pottsville Maroons.

== History ==
In the years following World War I, the coal mining towns of eastern Pennsylvania produced a number of outstanding football clubs. An annual competition between the locals for the Curran Cup produced a game that was arguably the equal of that played by the fledgling National Football League. Although these teams played each other as independents the success of the NFL eventually helped to prompt these teams to form their own official league.

=== Reasons for a league ===
The league was founded by James H. Gildea, Coaldale's manager. On August 28, 1924, Gildea set up a meeting at the town hall in Coaldale to establish the league. The managers and owners of every major coal region team and the local sportswriters were all invited.

The main reason for the league was to first put an end to teams raiding their opponents' rosters for big-name players. During this, money was being handed over by several managers in record amounts, as they hoped to lure the finest talent available. When the on-field talent was not available for signing, these managers would then steal players from other teams with the offer of higher salaries. As a result of the meeting, the teams agreed that the league teams had to secure all of their players prior to the start of the league season. A required list of eligible players had to also be filed by each team for all the others to observe. The plan was that all teams would be required to finish the season with the same players listed on the roster at the start of the year. Also a monetary forfeit of $500 or $1,000 had to be posted by each team to guarantee that the team would stick to its preseason player roster during league play and that there was no objection to any player being signed.

The second reason for establishing a league was to allow for the development of a concise scheduling format for the teams in the region. In the early 1920s, finding open dates when teams could play each other was difficult. Games were often delayed until the latest possible moment, usually 2–3 days before game day. One reason for this was the inability of some clubs to draw enough people into the ballpark. Many of the teams spent a lot of money signing talented players and in order to play them, the managers and owners relied heavily of the number of people in attendance for both home and road games. Every manager knew the importance and longed for the benefits of a sound, opponent-by-opponent schedule. As a result of the meeting, a schedule was agreed upon of twelve set dates from the beginning of October until the end of November. This move was also designed to allow non-league contests of natural rivals from nearby towns to take place at different intervals during and after the league's scheduled games.

With these two issues addressed, the Anthracite League was formed.

=== Broken agreement ===
The agreement from that meeting was soon broken by the Pottsville Maroons when Gus Sonnenberg, a guard from Dartmouth College and member of the Columbus Panhandles of the National Football League during the 1923 season, was signed by Maroons the day after a game in Coaldale. The Maroons were planning to stockpile as much talent as they could in an effort to provide the Maroons fans with a winning team. In doing so, the team's list of hired ringers topped that of any other club in region. In less than a week, several other league teams followed Pottsville's lead and signed every available big-name player, local or otherwise. Gilberton acquired three new star players just days before their season opener with the signings of Ben Shaw, Cecil Grigg, and Lou Smyth, all formerly of the NFL's Canton Bulldogs. The agreement to unify the coal region teams with an eligible player list took a backseat to the individual teams' "win at all cost" attitude.

This development promoted Gildea to schedule a league meeting on September 18, 1924, in Pottsville. At the meeting Gildea tried to push the understanding of an eligible player list, but to no avail. On September 25, 1924. in Shenandoah, a second meeting was called to address player eligibility. In this meeting Gildea made known his wishes for the teams in the region to thrive off of their own local talent. However, the four other teams felt since this was professional football, an eligible player list was a non-issue. The teams further contended that if an eligible list is made and the club must be held to that, then the players get the upper hand on the management and can demand almost any price for a game. Gildea was unable to make the other managers of the AFL agree with his ideas; As a result, the Coaldale team quit the newly formed league. However, Gildea stated that the team would still abide by the league schedule which was earlier arranged with all of the region teams.

=== Renovated stadiums ===
Several teams in the Anthracite Football League made structural improvements to their stadiums before the season began. These improvements were made because most of the managers believed that their teams were worthy of the status of a major professional football league. Coaldale constructed a grandstand which could accommodate 8,000 fans. The cost of their projects cost an estimated $3,500. The total cost of the upgrades for all the teams in the league was estimated to be a then-astronomical $15,000.

=== The 1924 season ===
The Maroons and Coaldale began their opening days with wins against non-league opponents. However, the Green Machine left the league after that win. Pottsville soon became the dominant force in the league and won the 1924 league championship with a 12-1-1 record. Giberton, which was led by future Pro Football Hall of Famer Fritz Pollard, finished second in the standings.

=== Folding the league ===
The league folded immediately after the season. The Maroons soon went on to be members of the NFL and were shortly the centerpoint of the 1925 NFL Championship controversy before moving to Boston in 1928 to become the Boston Bulldogs. The Bulldogs franchise then folded during the 1929 season.

Coaldale fell on hard times after they left the league. The team only won four games in 1924. Around the midpoint mark of their 1925 season they became strictly a traveling team, because every football fan in the region joined the Maroons' fanbase when the team joined the NFL. The team then joined the short lived Eastern League of Professional Football during its one season in 1926.

Only one of the Wilkes-Barre Barons league games was recorded in the AFL standings. That game was a 34–0 loss to the Maroons. This leaves the issue of the team's remaining league games a mystery. Some historians speculate that Wilkes-Barre attempted to imitate Coaldale's decision and quit the league. However some theories say that the team disbanded, or that they just rescheduled most of their games to take advantage of their closer regional opponents. Wilkes-Barre's roster may have also been depleted by the other Anthracite teams.

== 1924 standings ==
This table is shows both league and non-league game results.

The Pottsville Maroons were named the 1924 Anthracite League Champions.

Team	Games	Wins	Losses	Ties
Pottsville Maroons	14	12	1	1
Gilberton Cadamounts	13	4	3	1
Shenandoah Yellow Jackets	8	4	4	0
Coaldale Big Green	10	4	6	0
Wilkes-Barre Barons	1	0	1	0

== Hall of Famers ==
Individuals enshrined in the Pro Football Hall of Fame

- Fritz Pollard (Gilberton)
- Wilbur "Pete" Henry (Pottsville) (played after the team joined the NFL)
