= 1925 NFL Championship controversy =

American football-related controversy

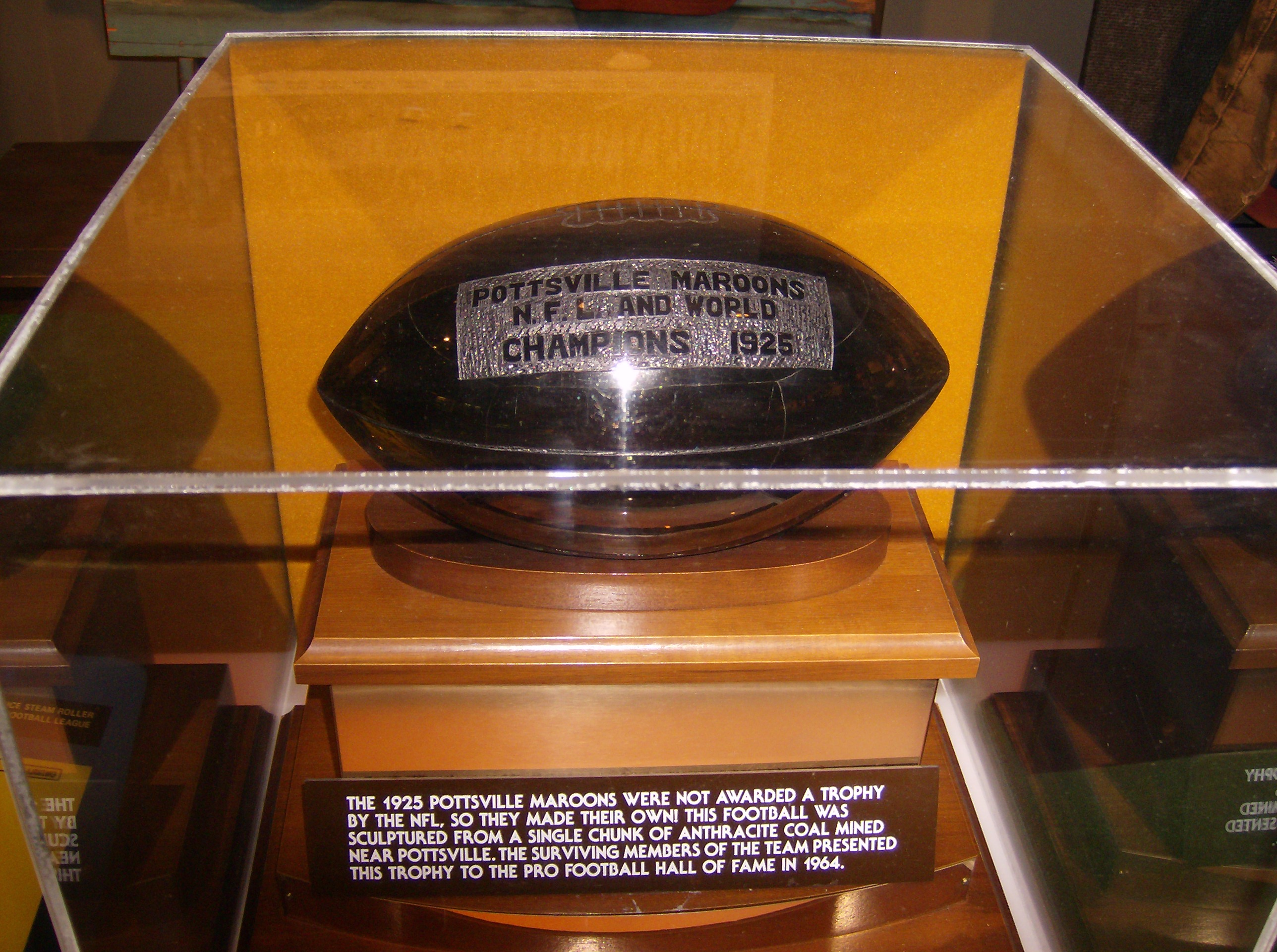
The Maroons' trophy (carved out of anthracite coal), made in 1925 and is now in the Pro Football Hall of Fame after being donated by surviving team members in 1964.

The 1925 National Football League (NFL) Championship which was awarded to the Chicago Cardinals, has long been the subject of controversy. The controversy focuses on the suspension of the Pottsville Maroons by then NFL commissioner Joseph Carr, which prevented them for a chance at taking the title. The Maroons were one of the dominant teams of the 1925 season, and after defeating the Chicago Cardinals 21–7 on December 6, they came away with the best record in the league. However, Carr suspended and removed the team from the NFL after they played an unauthorized exhibition game in Philadelphia, on the grounds that they had violated the territorial rights of that city's Frankford Yellow Jackets. Chicago played and won two more games against weak NFL opponents, but were sanctioned because Cardinals player Art Folz hired four Chicago high school football players to play for the Milwaukee Badgers under assumed names to ensure a Cardinals victory.

Pottsville supporters argue that the suspension was illegitimate because the NFL did not grant exclusive territory rights at the time, and that in any event, they had oral league approval to play the game in Philadelphia. Further, they argue that the Maroons, who were reinstated the next year, would have had the best record had they not been suspended. Others claim that Chicago was the legitimate champion based on the rules of the time. In 1963, the NFL investigated and rejected Pottsville's case, refusing to reopen the case in 2003. Both the NFL and the Pro Football Hall of Fame continue to list the Cardinals as the 1925 NFL champions.

== Background ==
Under the league rules during that time, the NFL title was automatically given to the team with the best record at the end of the season instead of having the winner be determined by a playoff tournament. There was an open-ended schedule during that season; although the final listed league games ended on December 6, teams could still schedule contests against each other through December 20 to make more money.

Pottsville vs. Chicago (1925)
| Pottsville Maroons (10–2–0) | Chicago Cardinals (11–2–1) |
|---|---|
| 21 | 7 |
| Head coach: Dick Rauch | Head coach: Norman Barry |
| | 1 | 2 | 3 | 4 | Total |
|---|---|---|---|---|---|
| POT | 0 | 14 | 0 | 7 | 21 |
| CHIC | 0 | 7 | 0 | 0 | 7 |
- Date: December 6, 1925
- Stadium: Comiskey Park; Chicago, Illinois

Pottsville vs. Notre Dame All-Stars (1925)
| Notre Dame Fighting Irish (Unknown) | Pottsville Maroons (10–2–0) |
|---|---|
| 7 | 9 |
| Head coach: Harry Stuhldreher | Head coach: Dick Rauch |
| | 1 | 2 | 3 | 4 | OT | Total |
|---|---|---|---|---|---|---|
| ND | 7 | 0 | 0 | 0 | 0 | 7 |
| POT | 0 | 0 | 6 | 3 | 0 | 9 |
- Date: December 12, 1925
- Stadium: Shibe Park; Philadelphia, Pennsylvania
- Referee: Bill Hollenback
- Attendance: 10,000

On December 6, Pottsville defeated Chicago 21–7 to establish the best record in the league, and seemed to all but officially clinch the NFL championship. Before they were awarded the championship, however, they were suspended by NFL commissioner Joseph Carr for playing a team called the "University of Notre Dame All-Stars" in Philadelphia (winning 9–7), on the grounds that the game violated the territorial franchise rights of the Frankford Yellow Jackets.

The game against the Notre Dame All-Stars had been originally devised by Frankford. It was planned as non-league exhibition game between former Notre Dame stars and the top NFL team in the east; after defeating the Maroons 20–0, Frankford had believed they would indeed be the NFL's top eastern team. However, when they were later defeated by the Maroons in a second contest, they lost the right to play the game. Instead, Pottsville would host the All-Stars at Minersville Park, while Frankford scheduled another league game against the Cleveland Bulldogs. Pottsville was excited to host Notre Dame, hoping it would be a huge financial windfall for the team. However, they felt that Minersville Park, a high school field with a low capacity, was too small for such a big event. Instead, they scheduled the game in Philadelphia, in the Yellow Jackets' territory. Frankford protested to commissioner Carr, who warned the Maroons in writing that they faced suspension if they played in Philadelphia. However, the Maroons claimed that the league office orally approved the game during a telephone call.

As a result of the suspension, Pottsville was prohibited from playing a scheduled game against the Providence Steam Roller or from completing its season. Ironically, Frankford was hurriedly substituted for the game at Providence. Meanwhile, Chicago scheduled and won two hastily arranged games against teams that had already disbanded for the season. This was within the NFL's rules at the time; teams were required to play eight league games, after which point they could either wrap up for the season, or schedule additional games to make more money. Hoping for some more cash, the Cardinals arranged to play the Milwaukee Badgers and the Hammond Pros, both of whom had already dispersed. Indeed, the Badgers were unable to bring back their full roster and resorted to substituting four high school players, which was in violation of NFL rules. The NFL heavily sanctioned both Chicago and Milwaukee following their game, going so far as to force the Badgers owner to sell the team. Carr said they would consider the game for removal from the standings; however, this never happened.

== Aftermath ==
Cardinals owner Chris O'Brien was later offered but refused to accept the Championship title for his team. At the owners' meeting after the end of the season, he argued that his team did not deserve to take the title over a team that had beaten them fairly. It appears that his reasons for scheduling the Milwaukee and Hammond games had been not to take the title, but rather to convince the Chicago Bears to play his team again; the Bears, with Red Grange on their roster, were a very lucrative draw. The NFL said it would revisit the issue later, but never did. It was only after the Bidwill family purchased the team in 1933 that the Cardinals began claiming the championship title.

It is sometimes stated that Pottsville played a fairly easy schedule prior to their suspension, often facing teams that were less than full strength from playing the day before in Frankford, making Pottsville's case less sympathetic. However, the Maroons' final three games were against the Green Bay Packers, who finished the year at 8–5–1, the Yellow Jackets, who had beaten them earlier in the year and finished 13–7, and the Cardinals. Pottsville won those games by scores of 31–0, 49–0 and 21–7, respectively, proving that they were a premier team.

By 1963, the NFL appointed a special commission to examine the case, but voted 12–2 in favor of continuing to recognize the Cardinals as champions. The lone dissenters were Art Rooney and George Halas, the then-owners of the Pittsburgh Steelers and the Chicago Bears, respectively. During this period, Charles "Stormy" Bidwill Jr., then head of the Chicago Cardinals, sent a letter to sports writer Red Smith opposing Pottsville's attempt to be recognized as the 1925 NFL champions, describing the town as small and insignificant. In 2003, the issue was brought up again during the league's October owners meeting, where a suggestion to co-award the 1925 championship title received backing from Dan Rooney of the Pittsburgh Steelers, Jeffrey Lurie of the Philadelphia Eagles, Pottsville's mayor John D. W. Reiley, and Pennsylvania's governor Ed Rendell, but Bill Bidwill persuaded the owners to vote 30–2 against it. Ironically, Philadelphia's franchise is the direct successor to and is the same franchise as (although, in league records, not the same team) the Frankford Yellow Jackets, the very team that filed the protest that resulted in the ruling in the first place; the Eagles replaced the Yellow Jackets after the latter went bankrupt and ceased operations. On December 10, 2007, the Pennsylvania House passed House Resolution 533 with full agreement, recognizing the achievements of the Pottsville Maroons and calling on the NFL to revisit the 1925 championship dispute, further amplifying advocacy efforts.

One of the strongest opponents of a reversal has been the family of Charles Bidwill and his son Bill, who have controlled the Cardinals since 1933, and began to claim the 1925 title as their own. Because the now-Arizona Cardinals franchise currently holds the NFL record for the longest championship drought, and also the longest championship drought within the four major professional sports leagues, having won only one title since 1925 (in 1947) and only six playoff games (three of those in one postseason) in sixty years, this futility has been attributed to a sports-related curse placed on the team by Pottsville.

The controversy involving territorial rights also led to the founding of the first American Football League after New York Giants owner Tim Mara objected to the leasing of Yankee Stadium and the application for an NFL franchise by C. C. Pyle. When the NFL rejected Pyle's overture, he formed a competing league to showcase the talents of Red Grange and George "Wildcat" Wilson. The rival league folded after the 1926 season, and Mara relented, allowing Pyle to operate his team in the NFL and at Yankee Stadium.

== See also ==
- 1920 season championship dispute
- Staley Swindle (discusses an earlier NFL championship controversy)
- 1925 NFL season
- 1925 Chicago Cardinals – Milwaukee Badgers scandal
- American Football League (1926)
- New York Yankees (NFL)
