= List of Washington & Jefferson Presidents football seasons =

The Washington & Jefferson Presidents football team represents Washington & Jefferson College in collegiate level football. The team competes in the NCAA Division III and is affiliated with the Presidents' Athletic Conference (PAC). Since its founding in 1890, the team has played their home games at Cameron Stadium.

The team was quite successful in its early years, ending each of its first 20 seasons with a winning record. David C. Morrow served as head coach three times for a total of eight seasons across three different decades. The team went on hiatus for two seasons during World War II. In 1970, the Presidents won their first Presidents' Athletic Conference championship. John Luckhardt coached for 17 seasons. Under his leadership, the team began a 40-year streak of winning seasons, running from 1984 to 2023.

== Season records ==
Conference champions †	Bowl game appearance *	NCAA Division III playoffs ^

Season	Head coach	Conference	Season results				Postseason
Season	Head coach	Conference	Wins	Losses	Ties	Conference finish	Postseason
Washington & Jefferson Presidents
1890	No coach	Independent	3	0	0		—
1891	No coach	Independent	4	2	0		—
1892	J. J. Clark	Independent	4	0	0		—
1893	Joseph Hamilton	Independent	6	2	0		—
1894	E. Gard Edwards	Independent	5	2	1		—
1895	E. Gard Edwards	Independent	6	1	1		—
1896	Clinton Woods	Independent	8	0	1		—
1897	Clinton Woods	Independent	10	1	0		—
1898	W. D. Inglis	Independent	8	2	0		—
1899	S. W. Black	Independent	9	2	0		—
1900	W. B. Seaman	Independent	6	3	1		—
1901	W. B. Seaman	Independent	6	2	2		—
1902	W. B. Seaman	Independent	6	4	0		—
1903	W. B. Seaman	Independent	8	2	0		—
1904	W. B. Seaman	Independent	5	3	1		—
1905	Frank Piekarski	Independent	9	3	0		—
1906	Frank Piekarski	Independent	9	2	0		—
1907	Frank Piekarski	Independent	7	2	0		—
1908	David C. Morrow	Independent	10	2	1		—
1909	David C. Morrow	Independent	8	1	1		—
1910	David C. Morrow	Independent	3	4	1		—
1911	David C. Morrow	Independent	6	4	0		—
1912	Bob Folwell	Independent	8	3	1		—
1913	Bob Folwell	Independent	10	0	1		—
1914	Bob Folwell	Independent	10	1	0		—
1915	Bob Folwell	Independent	8	1	1		—
1916	Sol Metzger	Independent	8	2	0		—
1917	Sol Metzger	Independent	7	3	0		—
1918	Ralph Hutchinson	Independent	2	2	0		—
1919	David C. Morrow	Independent	5	2	0		—
1920	David C. Morrow	Independent	6	3	1		—
1921	Greasy Neale	Independent	10	0	1		Tied Rose Bowl against California, 0–0*
1922	Greasy Neale	Independent	6	3	1		—
1923	John Heisman	Independent	6	1	1		—
1924	David C. Morrow	Independent	7	2	0		—
1925	David C. Morrow	Independent	6	2	1		—
1926	Andrew Kerr	Independent	7	1	1		—
1927	Andrew Kerr	Independent	7	0	2		—
1928	Andrew Kerr	Independent	2	5	2		—
1929	Bill Amos	Independent	5	2	2		—
1930	Bill Amos	Independent	5	2	1		—
1931	Bill Amos	Independent	6	4	0		—
1932	Leroy P. Day	Independent	5	3	1		—
1933	Leroy P. Day	Independent	2	7	1		—
1934	Leroy P. Day	Independent	4	5	0		—
1935	Leroy P. Day	Independent	4	4	0		—
1936	Leroy P. Day	Independent	5	3	0		—
1937	George Roark	Independent	2	5	1		—
1938	George Roark	Independent	5	2	1		—
1939	George Roark	Independent	5	3	0		—
1940	George Roark	Independent	4	4	0		—
1941	Stu Holcomb	Independent	5	1	1		—
1942	Pete Henry	Independent	3	5	0		—
Hiatus
1945	Pete Henry	Independent	1	4	0		—
1946	Henry Luecht	Independent	6	2	0		—
1947	Henry Luecht	Independent	4	5	0		—
1948	Henry Luecht	Independent	5	3	0		—
1949	Henry Luecht	Independent	2	6	0		—
1950	Alured Ransom	Independent	0	8	0		—
1951	Alured Ransom	Independent	3	3	0		—
1952	Joe McMullen	Independent	5	1	0		—
1953	Joe McMullen	Independent	4	4	0		—
1954	Charles Nelson	Independent	0	7	1		—
1955	Charles Nelson	Independent	0	8	0		—
1956	Edward Chupa	Independent	3	4	1		—
1957	Edward Chupa	Independent	1	6	1		—
1958	Edward Chupa	Presidents' Athletic Conference	1	7	0	—	—
1959	Edward Chupa	Presidents' Athletic Conference	0	6	1	—	—
1960	Chuck Ream	Presidents' Athletic Conference	1	6	0	—	—
1961	Chuck Ream	Presidents' Athletic Conference	0	7	0	—	—
1962	Chuck Ream	Presidents' Athletic Conference	4	3	0	—	—
1963	Chuck Ream	Presidents' Athletic Conference	5	2	0	—	—
1964	Chuck Ream	Presidents' Athletic Conference	5	3	0	—	—
1965	Chuck Ream	Presidents' Athletic Conference	4	4	0	—	—
1966	Chuck Ream	Presidents' Athletic Conference	1	5	0	—	—
1967	Chuck Ream	Presidents' Athletic Conference	1	6	0	—	—
1968	Chuck Ream	Presidents' Athletic Conference	2	6	0	—	—
1969	Chuck Ream	Presidents' Athletic Conference	1	7	0	—	—
1970	Chuck Ream	Presidents' Athletic Conference	7	1	0	1st	—
1971	Chuck Ream	Presidents' Athletic Conference	5	3	0	—	—
1972	Chuck Ream	Presidents' Athletic Conference	0	8	1	—	—
1973	Pat Mondock	Presidents' Athletic Conference	2	7	0	—	—
1974	Pat Mondock	Presidents' Athletic Conference	1	7	0	—	—
1975	Pat Mondock	Presidents' Athletic Conference	6	3	0	—	—
1976	Pat Mondock	Presidents' Athletic Conference	6	3	0	—	—
1977	Pat Mondock	Presidents' Athletic Conference	4	4	1	—	—
1978	Pat Mondock	Presidents' Athletic Conference	5	4	0	—	—
1979	Pat Mondock	Presidents' Athletic Conference	1	8	0	—	—
1980	Pat Mondock	Presidents' Athletic Conference	2	7	0	—	—
1981	Pat Mondock	Presidents' Athletic Conference	2	7	0	—	—
1982	John Luckhardt	Presidents' Athletic Conference	4	5	0	—	—
1983	John Luckhardt	Presidents' Athletic Conference	3	5	1	—	—
1984	John Luckhardt	Presidents' Athletic Conference	9	2	0	1st	NCAA Division III Playoffs
1985	John Luckhardt	Presidents' Athletic Conference	8	1	0	—	—
1986	John Luckhardt	Presidents' Athletic Conference	8	2	0	1st	NCAA Division III Playoffs
1987	John Luckhardt	Presidents' Athletic Conference	10	1	0	1st	NCAA Division III Playoffs
1988	John Luckhardt	Presidents' Athletic Conference	7	1	1	1st	—
1989	John Luckhardt	Presidents' Athletic Conference	8	2	0	1st	NCAA Division III Playoffs
1990	John Luckhardt	Presidents' Athletic Conference	10	1	0	1st	NCAA Division III Playoffs
1991	John Luckhardt	Presidents' Athletic Conference	8	2	0	1st	NCAA Division III Playoffs
1992	John Luckhardt	Presidents' Athletic Conference	11	2	0	1st	NCAA Division III Playoffs
1993	John Luckhardt	Presidents' Athletic Conference	11	1	0	1st	NCAA Division III Playoffs
1994	John Luckhardt	Presidents' Athletic Conference	11	2	0	1st	NCAA Division III Playoffs
1995	John Luckhardt	Presidents' Athletic Conference	10	1	0	1st	NCAA Division III Playoffs
1996	John Luckhardt	Presidents' Athletic Conference	8	2		1st	NCAA Division III Playoffs
1997	John Luckhardt	Presidents' Athletic Conference	6	3		—	—
1998	John Luckhardt	Presidents' Athletic Conference	5	4		1st	—
1999	John Banaszak	Presidents' Athletic Conference	9	3		1st	NCAA Division III Playoffs
2000	John Banaszak	Presidents' Athletic Conference	9	2		1st	NCAA Division III Playoffs
2001	John Banaszak	Presidents' Athletic Conference	11	1		1st	NCAA Division III Playoffs
2002	John Banaszak	Presidents' Athletic Conference	9	3		1st	NCAA Division III Playoffs
2003	Mike Sirianni	Presidents' Athletic Conference	9	2		—	Won ECAC Southwest Region Bowl against Wilkes University, 41–19*
2004	Mike Sirianni	Presidents' Athletic Conference	12	1		1st	NCAA Division III Playoffs
2005	Mike Sirianni	Presidents' Athletic Conference	9	2		—	NCAA Division III Playoffs
2006	Mike Sirianni	Presidents' Athletic Conference	10	2		1st	NCAA Division III Playoffs
2007	Mike Sirianni	Presidents' Athletic Conference	10	1		1st	NCAA Division III Playoffs
2008	Mike Sirianni	Presidents' Athletic Conference	11	2		—	NCAA Division III Playoffs
2009	Mike Sirianni	Presidents' Athletic Conference	9	2		2nd	NCAA Division III Playoffs
2010	Mike Sirianni	Presidents' Athletic Conference	9	2		2nd	Won ECAC Southwest Region Bowl against Franklin & Marshall, 54–41
2011	Mike Sirianni	Presidents' Athletic Conference	6	4		2nd	—
2012	Mike Sirianni	Presidents' Athletic Conference	8	3		T–1st	NCAA Division III Playoffs
2013	Mike Sirianni	Presidents' Athletic Conference	8	3		T–1st	NCAA Division III Playoffs
2014	Mike Sirianni	Presidents' Athletic Conference	10	2		T–1st	NCAA Division III Playoffs
2015	Mike Sirianni	Presidents' Athletic Conference	8	2		T–3rd	—
2016	Mike Sirianni	Presidents' Athletic Conference	9	2		T–3rd	Won ECAC Presidents Bowl against Brockport, 38–31
2017	Mike Sirianni	Presidents' Athletic Conference	11	1		1st	NCAA Division III Playoffs
2018	Mike Sirianni	Presidents' Athletic Conference	9	2		1st	NCAA Division III Playoffs
2019	Mike Sirianni	Presidents' Athletic Conference	8	3		4th	Won ECAC Asa S. Bushnell Bowl against Ithaca, 20–17
2020–21	Mike Sirianni	Presidents' Athletic Conference	3	1		1st	—
2021	Mike Sirianni	Presidents' Athletic Conference	8	3		2nd	Lost ECAC Clayton Chapman Bowl against Brockport, 7–20
2022	Mike Sirianni	Presidents' Athletic Conference	9	2		T–2nd	Won ECAC Asa S. Bushnell Bowl against Hobart, 35–18
2023	Mike Sirianni	Presidents' Athletic Conference	9	2		3rd	Won ECAC James Lynah Bowl against USMMA, 39–14
2024	Mike Sirianni	Presidents' Athletic Conference	9	2		T–1st	Lost NCAA Division III Playoffs Second Round against Randolph–Macon, 22–38
2025	Mike Sirianni	Presidents' Athletic Conference	8	3		1st	Lost NCAA Division III Playoffs First Round against Susquehanna, 32–38
Total			798	408	40	(includes bowl games and post-season appearances )	
