= List of Washington & Jefferson Presidents head football coaches =

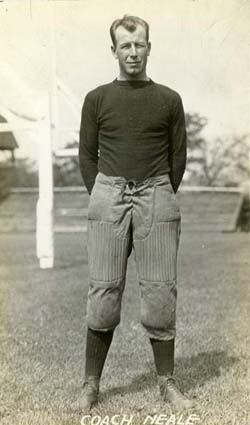
Greasy Neale coached the Presidents to the 1922 Rose Bowl.

The Washington & Jefferson Presidents football team has represented Washington & Jefferson College in intercollegiate college football competition since 1890. The team has competed in the National Collegiate Athletic Association (NCAA) Division III since its formation in 1973. From 1956 to 1972 Washington & Jefferson competed in the NCAA College Division. In 1958, the Presidents, who had previously been independent and not members of any conference, joined the Presidents' Athletic Conference.

As of the end of the 2024 season, the Presidents have played in 1,224 games during their 135 seasons; during that time they have employed 30 head coaches. In 1894, E. Gard Edwards became the first paid head coach. The hiring of professional coaches for the football team was controversial among large portions of the college community, including those who felt it was a poor use of college funds and faculty members who believed that the focus on athletics detracted from the ideal of a scholar-athlete. Professor Edward Linton represented the college at the 1906 founding of the International Athletic Association of the United States, the forerunner of the NCAA, where the first national standards for edibility and amateurism were developed. At that meeting, Linton expressed a desire for the student athlete to be "relieved of the incubus of the professional coach." Three coaches have led Washington & Jefferson College to the NCAA Division III playoffs: John Luckhardt, John Banaszak, and Mike Sirianni. Those three coaches, plus Chuck Ream, coached teams that won the Presidents' Athletic Conference Championship. Greasy Neale's 1921 team played in the 1922 Rose Bowl, the oldest bowl game, where they tied the heavily favored California Golden Bears. Neale is the only coach to lead the Presidents to a bowl game appearance.

Mike Sirianni is the all-time leader in seasons coached (22), games coached (240), and wins (194). John Banaszak has the highest winning percentage (.809) of any coach since the 1900s. During his two years as head coach, Charles Nelson has the worst winning percentage (.031). Four coaches, Greasy Neale, John Heisman, Andrew Kerr, and Pete Henry have been inducted into the College Football Hall of Fame. Two of those coaches, Greasy Neale and Pete Henry have been inducted into the Pro Football Hall of Fame. The current coach is Mike Sirianni, whose first season was in 2003.

== Key ==
General
No.	A running total of the number of coaches (Note: A running total of the number of head coaches, thus, any coach who have two or more separate terms as head coach is only counted once.)
CCs	Conference championships (Note: Washington & Jefferson College joined the Presidents' Athletic Conference in 1958.)
†	Elected to the College Football Hall of Fame

Overall games
GC	Games coached
OW	Wins
OL	Losses
OT	Ties (Note: Overtime rules in college football were introduced in 1996, making ties impossible in the period since.)
O%	Winning percentage (Note: When computing the win–loss percentage, a tie counts as half a win and half a loss.)

Postseason games
PW	Wins
PL	Losses
PT	Ties

== Coaches ==
Updated through 2025 college football season

No.	Name	Term	GC	OW	OL	OT	O%	PW	PL	PT	CCs	Awards
1	J. J. Clark	1892	4	4	0	0	1.000	—	—	—	—	—
2	Joseph Hamilton	1893	8	6	2	0	.750	—	—	—	—	—
3	E. Gard Edwards	1894–1895	16	11	3	2	.750	—	—	—	—	—
4	Clinton Wood	1896–1897	20	18	1	1	.925	—	—	—	—	—
5	William D. Inglis	1898	10	8	2	0	.800	—	—	—	—	—
6	S. W. Black	1899	12	9	2	1	.792	—	—	—	—	—
7	William B. Seaman	1900–1904	49	31	14	4	.673	—	—	—	—	—
8	Frank Piekarski	1905–1907	32	25	7	0	.781	—	—	—	—	—
9	David C. Morrow	1908–1911, 1919–1920, 1924–1925	77	52	20	5	.708	—	—	—	—	—
10	Bob Folwell	1912–1915	44	36	5	3	.852	—	—	—	—	—
11	Sol Metzger	1916–1917	20	15	5	0	.750	—	—	—	—	—
12	Ralph Hutchinson	1918	4	2	2	0	.500	—	—	—	—	—
13	Greasy Neale^{†}	1921–1922	21	16	3	2	.810	0	0	1	—	—
14	John Heisman^{†}	1923	9	7	1	1	.833	—	—	—	—	—
15	Andrew Kerr^{†}	1926–1928	27	16	6	5	.685	—	—	—	—	—
16	Bill Amos	1929–1931	28	17	8	3	.661	—	—	—	—	—
17	Hank Day	1932–1936	44	20	22	2	.477	—	—	—	—	—
18	George Roark	1937–1940	32	16	14	2	.531	—	—	—	—	—
19	Stu Holcomb	1941	7	5	1	1	.786	—	—	—	—	—
20	Pete Henry^{†}	1942, 1945	13	4	9	0	.308	—	—	—	—	—
21	Henry Luecht	1946–1949	33	17	16	0	.515	—	—	—	—	—
22	Alured Ransom	1950–1951	14	2	12	0	.143	—	—	—	—	—
23	Joe McMullen	1952–1953	14	9	5	0	.643	—	—	—	—	—
24	Charles Nelson	1954–1955	16	0	15	1	.031	—	—	—	—	—
25	Edward Chupa	1956–1959	31	5	23	3	.210	—	—	—	—	—
26	Chuck Ream	1960–1972	87	36	50	1	.420	—	—	—	1	—
27	Pat Mondock	1973–1981	80	29	50	1	.369	—	—	—	—	—
28	John Luckhardt^{†}	1982–1998	176	137	37	2	.784	13	11	—	13	AFCA Division III Coach of the Year (1992)
29	John Banaszak	1999–2002	47	38	9	—	.809	3	4	—	4	—
30	Mike Sirianni	2003–present	251	202	49	—	.805	8	15	—	11	—
