= A. J. Pagano =

American college football player for Washington & Jefferson College

No. 43
- Position: Running back

Personal information
- Listed height: 5 ft 9 in (1.75 m)
- Listed weight: 180 lb (82 kg)

Career information
- High school: Knoch High School
- College: Washington & Jefferson (1984–1987)

Career history
- Pittsburgh Steelers (1988)*
- * Offseason or practice squad member only

Awards and highlights
- All-Presidents' Athletic Conference (1984–1987); 2× Presidents' Athletic Conference MVP; All-American (2x)

Alfred J. "A.J." Pagano is a former college football player for Washington & Jefferson College. During his playing career, he was one of the most prominent NCAA Division III football players, gaining national attention and honors.

He attended Knoch High School, graduating in 1984. He was a leader of Knoch's Western Pennsylvania Interscholastic Athletic League championship in 1983.

He attended Washington & Jefferson College, majoring in business, where he played for the football team. He helped bring the Washington & Jefferson football team back to prominence; his success as a running back is credited with helping to improve recruiting efforts. In his freshman year, he led the Presidents to the NCAA Division III playoffs, their first post-season appearance since the 1922 Rose Bowl. He played multiple roles for the Presidents, gaining the nickname of "Mr. Everything." By his sophomore year, his coach John Luckhardt said that he was already among the greatest running backs in college history. During his career, he led the team to three Presidents' Athletic Conference (PAC) Championships and four appearances in the NCAA Division III playoffs He was a named to the All-PAC team four times (1984–1987). He was named PAC MVP and All-American twice. At the end of his college career, he was second in NCAA Division III history in total scoring, with 261 points.

In July 1988, he was signed by the Pittsburgh Steelers as an undrafted free agent. He was cut later that year, returning to his hometown to help manage his family's flooring business. He now resides in Butler, Pennsylvania where he is married with one son.

He currently holds the college record for all purpose yards in a single game (357), as well as other rushing records. He was inducted into the Washington & Jefferson Athletics Hall of Fame in 1999.
