= Joe Philbin =

American football coach (born 1961)

Personal information
- Born: July 2, 1961 (age 65); Springfield, Massachusetts, U.S.

Career information
- High school: Longmeadow (MA)
- College: Washington & Jefferson

Career history
- Tulane (1984–1985) Graduate assistant; WPI (1986–1987) Offensive line coach; Merchant Marine (1988–1989) Offensive line coach; Allegheny (1990–1993) Offensive coordinator & offensive line coach; Ohio (1994) Offensive line coach; Northeastern (1995–1996) Offensive coordinator & offensive line coach; Harvard (1997–1998) Offensive coordinator & offensive line coach; Iowa (1999–2002) Offensive line coach; Green Bay Packers (2003–2011); Assistant offensive line coach (2003); Tight ends coach & assistant offensive line coach (2004–2005); Offensive line coach (2006); Offensive coordinator (2007–2011); Miami Dolphins (2012–2015) Head coach; Indianapolis Colts (2016–2017) Assistant head coach & offensive line coach; Green Bay Packers (2018); Offensive coordinator (2018); Interim head coach (2018); Dallas Cowboys (2020–2022) Offensive line coach; Ohio State (2023) Offensive analyst; Las Vegas Raiders (2024–2025); Senior offensive assistant (2024–2025); Interim offensive line coach (2024)

Awards and highlights
- Super Bowl champion (XLV)

Head coaching record
- Career: 26–30 (.464)
- Coaching profile at Pro Football Reference

Joseph Anthony Philbin (born July 2, 1961) is an American football coach most recently the offensive line coach for the Las Vegas Raiders. He served as the offensive line coach for the Dallas Cowboys of the National Football League (NFL). He was the head coach of the Miami Dolphins, a position he held from 2012 to 2015. Philbin was also the offensive coordinator of the Green Bay Packers from 2007 to 2011, helping them win Super Bowl XLV over the Pittsburgh Steelers. Philbin served as interim head coach of the Packers for the final four games of the 2018 season after serving as the offensive coordinator for the first part of the season.

== Early life ==
Philbin was born in Springfield, Massachusetts to Paul and Mary Philbin. He attended Longmeadow High School and did a postgraduate year at Worcester Academy. He graduated from Washington & Jefferson College in 1984, where he obtained a B.A. in sociology and played one year on the football team. He was a member of the Lambda Chi Alpha fraternity. He pursued a Master of Education in administration and supervision from Tulane University in 1986.

== Coaching career ==
=== College ===
From 1984 to 2002, Philbin coached at the collegiate level. As the offensive coordinator, he helped win an NCAA Division III Football Championship with Allegheny College in 1990. In 1998, he was offered the position of head football coach at his alma mater, Washington & Jefferson, but turned down the position to coach at Iowa. He served under Kirk Ferentz at Iowa from 1999 to 2002.

=== Green Bay Packers ===
In 2003, Philbin joined the Green Bay Packers coaching staff. During his tenure as offensive coordinator (2007–2011), the Packers' offense ranked in the top 10 of the NFL for points scored and total yards each season, including their 2010 Super Bowl-winning season.

=== Miami Dolphins ===
On January 20, 2012, Philbin was named the tenth head coach of the Miami Dolphins, beating out interim coach Todd Bowles and Denver Broncos offensive coordinator Mike McCoy, who were the other two finalists for the job. Philbin praised the Dolphins as a team with a "strong nucleus to build around," as well as the "passion" of the fans, players and management. Dolphins owner Stephen M. Ross stated that Philbin has all of the attributes that he was looking for in a head coach. Philbin guided the team to a 24–28 record during his time as the Dolphins head coach, unable to lead them to a winning record or make the postseason. Through his first three seasons, the offense improved from ranking of 27th to 11th, while the defense slid from 7th to 20th. Philbin was fired by the Dolphins after a 1–3 start to the 2015 season. Reaction about the end of Philbin's tenure was met favorably by most fans and media alike. Tight ends coach Dan Campbell replaced Philbin as the team's interim head coach.

=== Indianapolis Colts ===
Philbin was hired by the Colts as offensive line and assistant head coach ahead of the 2016 season. He replaced Hal Hunter, who was let go following their 2015 campaign.

=== Return to Packers ===
On January 10, 2018, Philbin was hired by the Green Bay Packers to serve his second stint as their offensive coordinator (2007 to 2011).

On December 2, 2018, after a 17–20 Packers home loss to the 2–9 Arizona Cardinals (their first home loss to the Cardinals in 69 years), Philbin was named interim head coach of the Packers after Mike McCarthy was fired. He turned down an opportunity to stay on the staff in a different role, with the Packers hiring Matt LaFleur to take over head coaching responsibilities the following season.

=== Dallas Cowboys ===
On January 9, 2020, Philbin was hired by the Dallas Cowboys as their new offensive line coach. The move reunited Philbin with former Packers head coach Mike McCarthy, who became the current Cowboys head coach. Philbin served as his assistant on the Green Bay Packers from 2006 to 2011, and again in 2018 before McCarthy's firing.

Philbin was among five Cowboys coaches dismissed at the conclusion of the 2022 season.

=== Ohio State ===
On May 23, 2023, Philbin was hired by Ohio State University as an offensive analyst. He reunited with offensive coordinator Brian Hartline, a former Miami Dolphin wide receiver who played under Philbin from 2012 to 2014.

=== Las Vegas Raiders ===
On February 20, 2024, the Las Vegas Raiders hired Philbin as their senior offensive assistant. He was named the team's interim offensive line coach on November 5, 2024, following the firing of James Cregg.

== Head coaching record ==
| Team | Year | Regular season | | | | | Postseason | | | |
| Team | Year | Won | Lost | Ties | Win % | Finish | Won | Lost | Win % | Result |
|---|---|---|---|---|---|---|---|---|---|---|
| MIA | 2012 | 7 | 9 | 0 | .438 | 2nd in AFC East | — | — | — | — |
| MIA | 2013 | 8 | 8 | 0 | .500 | 3rd in AFC East | — | — | — | — |
| MIA | 2014 | 8 | 8 | 0 | .500 | 3rd in AFC East | — | — | — | — |
| MIA | 2015 | 1 | 3 | 0 | .250 | Fired | — | — | — | — |
| MIA total | | 24 | 28 | 0 | .462 | | 0 | 0 | .000 | |
| GB* | 2018 | 2 | 2 | 0 | .500 | 3rd in NFC North | | | | |
| GB total | | 2 | 2 | 0 | .500 | | | | | |
| Total | | 26 | 30 | 0 | .464 | | 0 | 0 | .000 | |

* – Interim head coach

== Personal life ==
Philbin is married to Diane Marie Philbin (née Donahue). Their son, Michael, was reported missing on January 8, 2012. The following evening, a body pulled from the Fox River in Oshkosh was confirmed to be 21-year-old Michael Philbin. Toxicology results later showed that Michael had been under the influence of alcohol at the time of his death.

In 2014 in Florida, Philbin's son Matthew crashed his vehicle into another car and fled the scene of the accident.

Matthew is currently a Section 8 landlord in San Diego.
