= Russ Stein =

American football player (1896–1970)

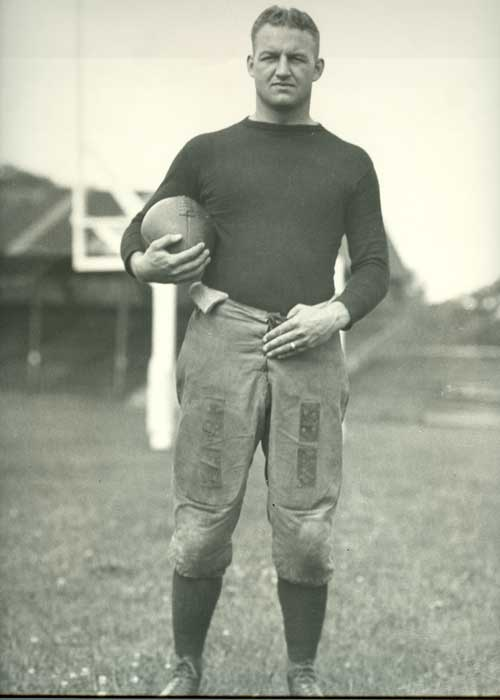
- Stein in 1921

No. 13, 1 ,9
- Positions: Tackle, end, center

Personal information
- Born: April 21, 1896; Warren, Ohio, U.S.
- Died: May 28, 1970 (aged 74); Warren, Ohio, U.S.
- Listed height: 6 ft 1 in (1.85 m)
- Listed weight: 210 lb (95 kg)

Career information
- High school: Niles McKinley (OH), The Kiski School (PA)
- College: Washington & Jefferson

Career history
- Toledo Maroons (1922); Frankford Yellow Jackets (1924); Pottsville Maroons (1925); Canton Bulldogs (1926)

Awards and highlights
- Disputed NFL champion (1925); First-team All-American (1921); Rose Bowl Game MVP (1922); Colliers Eye Mag.: 2nd team All-NFL (1925); Rose Bowl Hall of Fame (1991); Washington & Jefferson Athletics Hall of Fame (1999)
- Stats at Pro Football Reference

Russell Frederick Stein (April 21, 1896 – May 28, 1970) was an American football player. He was born in Warren, Ohio. After high school, Stein attended Washington & Jefferson College. While in College he was the captain of Washington & Jefferson's 1921 undefeated football team, which played to the only scoreless tie in the history of the 1922 Rose Bowl against the California Golden Bears. He was one of the 11 players who played in the entire game in which Washington & Jefferson held the Golden Bears to only 49 yards rushing, two first downs, and no pass completions. Stein was named the game's Most Outstanding Player and was inducted into the Rose Bowl Hall of Fame in 1991. He was selected to Walter Camp's All-American team in 1921, where he joined his brother, Herb, as the first brothers to be named All-Americans in the same year. He was later inducted into the Washington & Jefferson Athletics Hall of Fame in 1999.

Stein made his professional debut in the National Football League (NFL) in 1922 with the Toledo Maroons. He played for Toledo, Canton Bulldogs, Frankford Yellow Jackets, and the Pottsville Maroons over the course of his four-year career. Stein (along with his younger brother, Herb) was also a member of the 1925 Pottsville Maroons team that won the 1925 NFL Championship, before it was stripped from the team due to a disputed rules violation.

== Head coaching record ==
Year	Team	Overall	Conference	Standing	Bowl/playoffs
Oglethorpe Stormy Petrels (Southern Intercollegiate Athletic Association) (1922)
1922	Oglethorpe	1–9	0–4	17th	
Oglethorpe:		1–9	0–4		
Total:		1–9			
