= Robert M. Murphy =

American administrator (1878–1925)

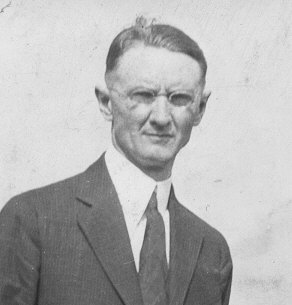
- Born: December 17, 1878; Ligonier, Pennsylvania
- Died: 4 July 1925 (aged 46); Washington, Pennsylvania
- Education: Washington & Jefferson College
- Years active: 1906-1925
- Known for: College administrator, student solicitor and graduate manager for W&J College

Robert Martin "Mother" Murphy (17 December 1878 - 4 July 1925) was a university administrator at Washington & Jefferson College; his efforts to improve the Washington & Jefferson Presidents football team directly led to its development as a national powerhouse during the early 20th century.

== Career at Washington & Jefferson College ==
Murphy graduated from Washington & Jefferson College in 1906. From 1906 to 1925, he served as the college's student solicitor and graduate manager for the football team. In that position, he personally recruited many of the players that eventually comprised the most successful teams in the College's history. The modern analogue of his position would be the athletic director.

College president James D. Moffat personally credited Murphy for increasing the enrollment by 9%.

In 1910, the football program was in danger of being dissolved due to crushing debt. The Student Athletic Committee proposed a $1 per term student fee to fund the team, a proposal that was met with initial resistance from the student body. However, team manager and beloved student solicitor Murphy was able to convince the students to accept the fee.

In 1912, he personally recruited Bob Folwell away from Lafayette College to serve as head coach for the football team This move ushered in the era of dominance for the football squad. That era of dominance peaked in the 1921 season, when the Presidents were invited to play in the 1922 Rose Bowl. Twenty men traveled on the cross-country trip and Murphy had to mortgage his home to pay his family’s way.

He died on July 4, 1925.

W & J College graduate and football historian E. Lee North detailed many of Robert Murphy's accomplishments in "The Incredible Bob Murphy." One paragraph reads, "As Graduate Manager, Murphy scheduled games with the best teams in the country-- Pitt, Harvard, Yale, Princeton, Notre Dame, Army, Navy, Penn, Penn State, Syracuse... To do battle, he somehow encouraged super players and coaches to come to little Washington, Pa.-- his coaches read like a Who's Who from the Hall of Fame -- Earl "Greasy" Neal, John W. Heisman, Andy Kerr, Sol Metzger, Dave Morrow, and perhaps the greatest of all, Bob Folwell. His recruits Pete Henry and Bill Amos served as coaches later on, and Henry was athletic director for many years."

== Posthumous honors ==
On Mother's Day in 1936, the college honored Murphy by dedicating a day of service to Murphy's memory.

The college's athletic program presents the annual "Robert M. Murphy Award" to graduates who have made "outstanding contributions or offered extraordinary service to athletics at W&J after graduation." The award has been presented at the annual Athletic Hall of Fame induction ceremony.

The Rule, Hughes, and Murphy Prize, named for Murphy and two other alumni (James Rule (1898), Howard Hughes ’11) honors sophomore students who display high levels of "academic achievement, academic promise, and leadership potential." The award carries a $2,000 cash prize.
