= Herb Kopf =

American football player and coach (1901–1996)

Biographical details
- Born: June 25, 1901; Winsted, Connecticut, U.S.
- Died: March 22, 1996 (aged 94); St. Petersburg, Florida, U.S.

Playing career
- 1921–1924: Washington & Jefferson
- 1925: Hartford Blues
- Position: End

Coaching career (HC unless noted)
- 1925–1929: Georgetown (assistant)
- 1930–1937: Columbia (assistant)
- 1938–1942: Manhattan
- 1944–1946: Boston Yanks
- 1948–1950: Boston College (assistant)
- 1953–1957: Brandeis (assistant)

Administrative career (AD unless noted)
- 1938–1944: Manhattan

Head coaching record
- Overall: 18–24–1 (college); 7–22–2 (NFL)

Herbert M. Kopf (June 25, 1901 – March 22, 1996) was an American football player and coach. He was the head football coach at Manhattan College from 1938 to 1942 and the head coach for the Boston Yanks of the National Football League (NFL) from 1944 to 1946.

== Playing career ==
A star baseball player at New Britain High School in New Britain, Connecticut, Kopf switched to football when Washington & Jefferson College dropped its baseball program before his freshman season. A star offensive and defensive end, Kopf was a member of the 10-0 Presidents team that played in the 1922 Rose Bowl, the first freshman to play in a Rose Bowl. As a sophomore, Kopf was selected by coach John W. Heisman to call the offensive plays and was a Walter Camp All-America selection.

== Coaching career ==
While attending Georgetown Law School, Kopf was hired as an offensive assistant by Lou Little in 1925. Kopf followed Little to Columbia University in 1930 where he coached the ends and backfield for eight seasons. In 1934, Columbia won the Ivy League championship, finishing the season with a 7–1 record and a 7–0 win in the 1934 Rose Bowl.

Kopf was the head football coach at the Manhattan College from 1938 until the program ended in 1942. His career coaching record at Manhattan was 18–24–1 which ranks him second at Manhattan in total wins and fifth in winning percentage.

At the end of the 1942 season, Manhattan College, like many schools of the day, suspended intercollegiate football games because of World War II. At the end of the war, the college decided not to reactivate the program. Kopf was the school's athletic director from 1938 to 1944.

In 1944, Kopf was named head coach of the Boston Yanks. This job was supposed to be temporary until Jim Crowley returned from the Navy. However, instead of coaching the Yanks, Crowley became commissioner of the new All-America Football Conference and Kopf remained as the Yanks' head coach until 1946. In his three seasons with them, Kopf had a record of 7–22–2. In 1948, he was hired as an assistant under Denny Myers at Boston College. He was not retained by new head coach, Mike Holovak, in 1951. His final coaching job was as an assistant to Benny Friedman at Brandeis University.

== Later life and death ==
After coaching, Kopf worked as a paint salesman. He later retired to St. Petersburg, Florida, where he died on March 22, 1996. He had a TV show on Saturday mornings explaining the football game that was going to be shown on TV that day.

== Personal life ==
Kopf was the brother of Larry Kopf, an infielder in the Major Leagues from 1913 to 1923, and was the Cincinnati Reds on-field messenger during his brother's time there. He was with the Reds during the 1919 World Series, made famous by the Black Sox Scandal.

== Head coaching record ==
=== College ===
Year	Team	Overall	Conference	Standing	Bowl/playoffs
Manhattan Jaspers (Independent) (1938–1942)
1938	Manhattan	5–4			
1939	Manhattan	4–4			
1940	Manhattan	3–6			
1941	Manhattan	4–4–1			
1942	Manhattan	2–6			
Manhattan:		18–24–1			
Total:		18–24–1			

=== NFL ===
Team	Year	Regular season					Postseason			
Team	Year	Won	Lost	Ties	Win %	Finish	Won	Lost	Win %	Result
BOS	1944	2	8	0	.200	4th in NFL Eastern	–	–	–	–
BOS	1945	3	6	1	.350	3rd in NFL Eastern	–	–	–	–
BOS	1946	2	8	1	.227	5th in NFL Eastern	–	–	–	–
BOS Total		7	22	2	.258		–	–	–	
Total		7	22	2	.258		–	–	–	
