= Knoch High School =

Location
- 345 Knoch Rd. Saxonburg, Pennsylvania 16056; United States
- Coordinates: 40°44′59″N 79°49′45″W

Information
- School district: Knoch School District
- Superintendent: David Foley
- Dean: Christian Riley
- Principal: Kurt Reiser
- Teaching staff: 48.00 (FTE)
- Student to teacher ratio: 15.02
- Colours: Gold and blue
- Team name: Knights
- Yearbook: Lance
- Website: https://high.knochsd.org/

Knoch High School is part of the Knoch School District, which is located in Saxonburg, Pennsylvania. It was named after Eva Knoch, who donated the land on which this school was built.

The school mascot is a knight; students are referred to as the "Knoch Knights." The Knoch colors are blue and gold.

== History ==
Knoch Junior High School opened in 1958; at that time, its teachers educated seventh through twelfth-grade students. In 1996, the building was remodeled, and Knoch Middle School was created, restructuring Knoch High to a ninth through twelfth-grade school. The current principal is Todd Trofimuk. Kurt Resier is the dean of students. There are approximately 1,000 to 1,200 students in the high school.

Sports teams from this school are members of the AAA under the Pennsylvania Interscholastic Athletic Association.

Sports offered include Girls Volleyball, Boys Football, Boys & Girls Cross Country, Girls & Boys Soccer, Girls & Boys Tennis, Boys & Girls Basketball, Girls & Boys Swimming and Diving, Boys & Girls Wrestling, Boys Hockey, Boys Baseball, Girls Softball, Girls & Boys Track, Boys & Girls Lacrosse. Their primary sports rivals are Mars, Butler Area Senior High School, Freeport Area School District, Indiana Area School District, Elizabeth Forward School District, Hampton Township School District (Pennsylvania), Chartiers Valley School District, Deer Lakes School District, Leechburg Area School District, Apollo-Ridge School District, Highlands School District (Pennsylvania), Valley Junior/Senior High School, and other schools districts.

== Honors and awards ==
The Knoch Football team was a co-champion of the Greater Allegheny Conference in 2007. In 2011, the Knights were the Greater Allegheny Conference champions with a perfect regular season record of 9–0. They played in the WPIAL championship at Heinz Field, but lost to Montour High School, ending with a season record of 12–1.

== Notable alumni ==
- Joby Harris, NASA artist
- Michele McDonald, Miss USA 1971
- A. J. Pagano, former college football player
- Michele Pawk, Tony Award-winning actress
- Jim Simons, former professional golfer
- Robert Smolen, former U.S. Air Force commanding general
- Scot Thompson, former professional baseball player, Chicago Cubs, Montreal Expos, and San Francisco Giants
- Jordan Geist, professional track and field athlete.
