= Chris Babirad =

American college football player

No. 24 – Washington & Jefferson College
- Position: Running back
- Class: 1994

Career information
- High school: Bentworth High School

Awards and highlights
- Kodak All-American (1992); USA Today Player of the Year (1992); W&J Athletics Hall of Fame (Class of 1999)

Chris Babirad is a former college football player for Washington & Jefferson College. During his playing career, he was one of the most prominent NCAA Division III football players, gaining national attention and honors.

He owns every major rushing and scoring record in Washington & Jefferson football history.

He is considered to be one of the greatest athletes in Washington & Jefferson athletic history; his name is mentioned among Pete Henry and Dan Towler as candidates for all-time greatest athlete at the college.

He gained 4,419 career regular-season yards, which is the 20th best in NCAA Division III history; his 10.7 points per game are 11th in NCAA history. During his playing career, he was named First Team All-Presidents' Athletic Conference twice and as a Kodak and Champion All-American in 1992. In 1992, he led the W&J team to the Amos Alonzo Stagg Bowl and to the Lambert-Meadowlands Trophy and was named USA Today Player of the Year. During the semi-final game versus Rowan University, he led the team to victory by rushing for 81 yards for a touchdown in the game's final minutes. He also played on the baseball team, earning varsity letters three times.

While a student at Bentworth High School in Bentleyville, Pennsylvania, he rushed for 3,000 career yards. A potential scholarship offer to play at Penn State did not come to fruition after he broke an ankle during his senior year.
