= Washington & Jefferson Presidents football =

Collegiate level football team

- First season: 1890; 136 years ago
- Athletic director: Scott McGuinness
- Head coach: Mike Sirianni; 23rd season, 199–48 (.806)
- Location: Washington, Pennsylvania, US
- Stadium: Cameron Stadium (capacity: 3,500)
- NCAA division: Division III
- Conference: PAC
- Colors: Red and black
- All-time record: 781–403–40 (.654)
- Bowl record: 7–1–1 (.833)

National championships
- Unclaimed: 1 (1921)

Conference championships
- 27

Uniforms
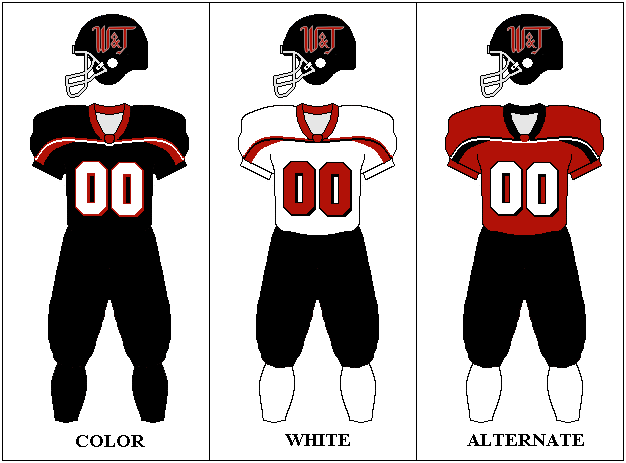
- Mascot: Presidents
- Website: W&J Football

The Washington & Jefferson Presidents football team represents Washington & Jefferson College in college football. The team competes in NCAA Division III and is affiliated with the Presidents' Athletic Conference (PAC). Since its founding in 1890, the team has played their home games at College Field, which was remodeled and renamed Cameron Stadium in 2001.

A number of players were named to the College Football All-America Team, and two players, Pete Henry and Edgar Garbisch, have been elected to the College Football Hall of Fame. Several other former players have gone on to play professionally, including "Deacon" Dan Towler, Russ Stein, and Pete Henry, who was also elected to the Pro Football Hall of Fame and the National Football League (NFL) 1920s All-Decade Team. The team has been coached by some of the best-known coaches in football history, including John Heisman, Greasy Neale, and Andy Kerr.

Founded in 1890, the team quickly became well known for drawing large crowds and defeating a number of prominent football teams. The faculty and administration expressed concern over the strength of the team and made efforts to reduce the influence of professionalism on the players. During the 1910s, some sportswriters suggested that the Presidents were one of the top teams in the nation. The greatest achievement in the team's history was in 1921, when the Presidents appeared in the 1922 Rose Bowl, playing the heavily favored California Golden Bears to a scoreless tie. The Red and Black finished the season with a share of the 1921 national championship, as retrospectively named in the 1930s by the Boand System. As college football evolved in the 1930s and 1940s, the Presidents fell far behind their larger competitors, who were able to offer scholarships for their players. Controversy over the poor play of the football team, and a lack of play against larger teams, contributed to the resignation of a college president. In 1958 the team joined the newly-formed NCAA College Division and the Presidents' Athletic Conference. In the 1970s the team joined NCAA Division III when the NCAA split the College Division. By the 1980s, the team had learned to thrive in that environment, winning a number of conference championships and regularly qualifying for the NCAA Division III playoffs.

== History ==
=== Early history (1890–1899) ===
The development of intercollegiate athletics at Washington & Jefferson College began in 1890, when students formed the Athletic Association, charging the 75 members a $1 membership fee that went to fund athletics. The football team played its first game on November 1, 1890, a 34–0 win against the Western University of Pennsylvania. The Red and Black's third game of the inaugural season, against College of Wooster, remains disputed to this day, with both schools claiming a victory. Controversy erupted over the referees' clock management when W&J's team, under the impression that the game was over, left the field with a 4–0 lead; Wooster continued to play and scored a touchdown and extra point to give them a disputed 6–4 victory. By 1894, the college community's interest in the sport had grown considerably, with stronger opponents and the team's first paid coach, E. Gard Edwards. A special train from Washington to Pittsburgh was chartered to carry fans and students to a watch a 6–0 victory against the semi-pro Pittsburgh Athletic Club.

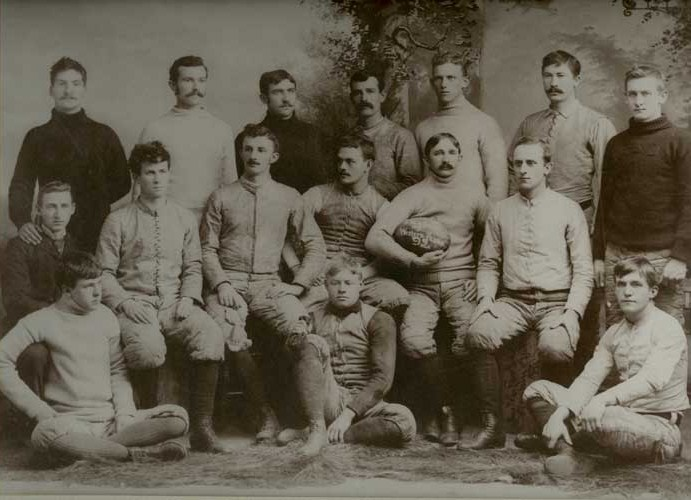
The 1892 team

As the team developed, the college community, especially certain members of the faculty, began to express concerns regarding the influence of professionalism in college sports, especially the use of itinerant and semi-professional students. John Brallier, who was the first openly professional football player, played football for Washington & Jefferson College in 1895 before returning to the Greensburg Athletic Association. This incident, and others, caused the faculty to adopt the college's first eligibility requirements for student athletes.

At the same time its activities were becoming more scrutinized, the football team became more successful. The season finale in 1896 at Exposition Park in Pittsburgh was one of the largest crowds in western Pennsylvania history, when an overflow crowd of 12,000 watched W&J defeat Duquesne Country and Athletic Club 4–0. But it was the September 29, 1897, game against the University of Pennsylvania Quakers that marked the "birth of big-time football" at W&J. The Red and Black lost 18–4 to the eventual national champions, but W&J counted it a moral victory, since they were missing 4 of their 11 starters due to new eligibility requirements. In a game against Denison University on Sept. 19, 1908, W&J became the first college football team in history to wear numbered uniforms.

=== New residency requirements and near-dissolution (1900–1911) ===
By the early 1900s, "football fever" had swept through the student body, leading the College administration to take steps to further integrate the sport into the educational framework, including the development of a new governance structure. The new Student Athletic Committee and Faculty Athletic Committees instituted a minimum one-year residency requirement to combat transient students and created an alumni coach system, so the coaches would be more sympathetic to the educational objectives of the college.

In 1910, the football program was in danger of being dissolved due to crushing debt. The Student Athletic Committee proposed a $1 per term student fee to fund the team, a proposal that was met with initial resistance from the student body. However, team manager and beloved student solicitor Robert M. Murphy, was able to convince the students to accept the fee. The Student Athletic Committee agreed to retract the residency rule, as it was blamed for contributing to losses, but instituted other student athlete requirements, including a ban on the use of preparatory students at Washington & Jefferson Academy, an increase in entrance requirements, and a stringent system of recording absences. However, the Faculty Athletic Committee balked, vetoing the new rules.

The firings of Dr. G.H. Winchester and Dr. H.E. Wells highlighted the growing tension between athletics and academics. As orchestrated by a group of alumni football supporters, the two professors were brought before a faculty committee for not having the requisite support for the athletic programs. At the time, Dr. Winchester was serving in France during World War I and Wells maintained during the hearing that he did not object to athletics per se, but rather the way it was run at Washington & Jefferson. The event, known nationally as the Winchester-Wells case, was investigated by the American Association of University Professors and was the profiled in Upton Sinclair's book The Goose-Step, a muckraking investigation into the state of American colleges.

=== Bob Folwell era (1912–1920) ===
In 1912, head coach Bob Folwell was recruited away from Lafayette College by the team manager Robert M. Murphy. An early high point came in 1912 when Folwell's team held Jim Thorpe and the Carlisle Indians to a scoreless tie. The 1913 team posted a 10-0-1 record and were the highest scoring team in the nation. That season featured a scoreless tie with Yale, a 100–0 defeat of Grove City College, and a 17–0 victory over Penn State that broke the Nittany Lions' 19-game winning streak, earning the entire school a day off to celebrate. 1913 was the first season that the team was able to hire trained athletic coaches. Three players were named All-Americans. Sportswriter Walter S. Trumbull of The New York Sun suggested that the Michigan Aggies, Washington & Jefferson, Chicago University, and Notre Dame were the new "Big 4 of College Football" instead of the traditional grouping of Princeton, Yale, Harvard, and Penn.

The 1914 squad lost at Harvard University in front of 15,000 fans by a score of 10–9. If not for an errant kick that hit the crossbar, W&J would have won the game and at least a share of the mythical national championship. That squad saved face by becoming only the seventh team to ever defeat Yale University, with a decisive 13–7 victory. The game received national press coverage, and the team received a personal note of congratulations by Theodore Roosevelt.

Folwell left to coach at Penn, his alma mater, following the 1915 season. He was succeeded by Sol Metzger, who led the team to a 15–5 record during the 1916 and 1917 seasons. Ralph Hutchinson took over the team for the 1918 season, which ended with a 2–2 record in a World War I-shortened season. David C. Morrow, who had coached the team a decade earlier, returned for his second stint during 1919 and 1920.

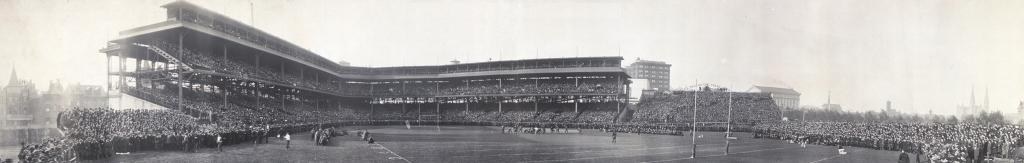
W&J playing the University of Pittsburgh at Forbes Field, 1915

=== Neale, Heisman, and Kerr years (1921–1928) ===
The power of this Eastern eleven lay in its ability to rip through and smear opposing plays. Its uncanny faculty in this department was pronounced especially so in a season where the attack was featured and the offensive often given no great attention. Any attack in the country, including that bewildering onslaught launched by Notre Dame, would have found great trouble in hammering out any extensive distance against Neale's machine.

— Grantland Rice, describing the 1921 football team

The 1921 team, coached by Greasy Neale, went 10–0 in the regular season, defeating powerhouses Pitt, University of Detroit, and Syracuse. The 7–0 victory over rival Pitt was celebrated with a day of canceled classes and a bonfire with inspirational speeches in front of the Washington County Courthouse. As the best team from the east, W&J was invited to the 1922 Rose Bowl to play the best team from the west: the undefeated and heavily favored California Golden Bears. Some had even begun to call Cal the best team in college football history. The Red and Black could only afford to send 11 men on the cross-country trip and Robert M. Murphy had to mortgage his home to pay his way. Thus, W&J would be the last Rose Bowl team to play the same 11 men the entire game. During the train ride to Pasadena, in which Greasy Neale continued to prepare his men, Lee Spillers caught pneumonia and could not finish the journey. Ross "Bucky" Buchannan, a reserve player who had stowed away on the train and was fed smuggled sandwiches during the trip, filled Buchannan's roster spot.

Cal had outscored their opponents that season by a margin of 312–33; nevertheless, the W&J defense held the Golden Bears' potent offense, led by Brick Muller, to no points, 2 first downs, no completed passes, and only 49 yards rushing. In one of the most disputed plays in Rose Bowl history, a rushing touchdown for W&J was overturned for an offside penalty called on Wayne Brenkert. On another play, W&J's Hal Erickson slipped and fell on his way to scoring a sure touchdown. The contest ended in a scoreless draw. The game was notable as the last time a "small school" would be represented in the Rose Bowl. W&J's team featured two Rose Bowl firsts: Herb Kopf was the first freshman to play and Charlie "Pruner" West was the first African American to play quarterback. W&J's team captain, Russ Stein, was inducted into the Rose Bowl Hall of Fame in 1991. The Red and Black finished the season with a share (along with California and Lafayette) of the 1921 national championship, as retroactively determined in 1930 by the Boand System, recognized as a "major selector" by the NCAA.

One of the best games in W&J football history came on November 4, 1922, against the Lafayette Maroons in front of 50,000 spectators at the Polo Grounds in New York City. The Red and Black were down 13–0 at halftime before a Pruner West-sparked comeback won the game 14–13 on a final play to Herb Kopf. In 1923, W&J defeated the powerful Brown University at College Park, the first time home victory against an Ivy League team. Neale left to coach at University of Virginia and was replaced by legendary coach John Heisman, who stayed for only one season before moving to coach at Rice University. During the season Heisman coached, W&J beat the previously undefeated West Virginia Mountaineers. Andy Kerr's teams from 1926 to 1928 continued to play and defeat the best teams in the country. In 1930, W&J defeated Lafayette College 7–0 in the first ever college indoor night game, held in front of 20,000 spectators in Atlantic City.

=== Great Depression and decline of the football program (1929–1981) ===
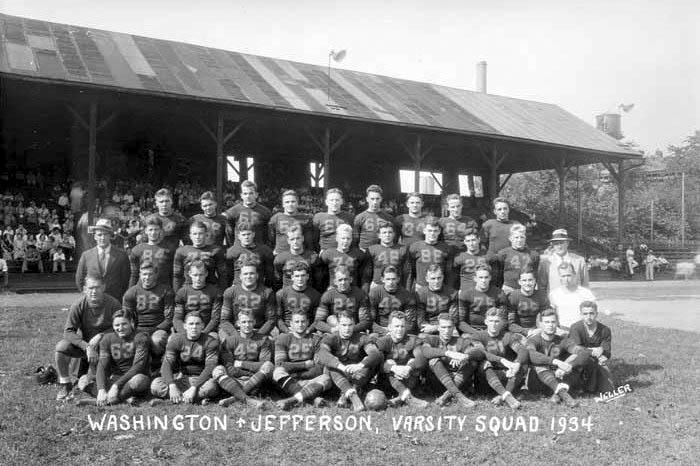
1934 team

Like the rest of the college, the football program struggled as a result of decreased enrollment and funding during the Depression. During the tenure of college president Simon Strousse Baker, the Student and Faculty Athletic Committees were heavily in debt and approaching insolvency. The gate receipts for football games, the Committees' main source of income, had fallen as the team began to lag behind the larger schools it traditionally played. A report in 1929 by the Carnegie Foundation for the Advancement of Teaching showed that the W&J athletics program, like many programs at other colleges, held a large "slush fund" with donations from alumni and businessmen totaling $25,000 to $50,000 per year. This "extreme case of subsidizing" funded all college expenses for football players, plus "paychecks" to top performers. To alleviate this problem, President Baker proposed to wholly separate athletic funds from general College funds by creating an "Athletic Council" to take control of the athletic program. In spite of the defeat of the proposal, a 1931 follow-up to the original Carnegie Foundation report commended W&J for creating some institutional controls, including limiting subsidization to tuition, room, and board. In 1932, Baker was hounded from office amid a student strike, partially fueled by frustration with the declining sports programs.

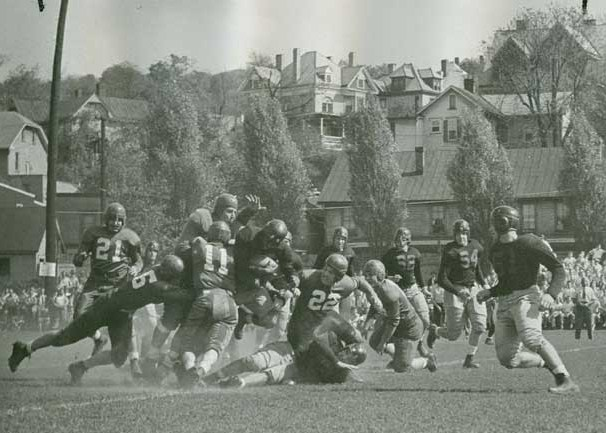
The 1946 Washington & Jefferson Presidents football team playing at College Field

Baker's successor, Ralph Cooper Hutchison, himself more personally popular than Baker, was able to bring even more control to the athletic program by reducing the number of scholarships from 18 to eight and by limiting the practice of playing against powerhouse football teams. In 1935, W&J played its last games against their former rivals Pitt and West Virginia. Later, the athletic program was reorganized under an Athletic Director and the practice of awarding athletic scholarships was abolished. In 1937, Hutchison created a whole new governing structure for athletics, the Athletic Council, which was not unlike the plan proposed by Baker a decade earlier. The new Athletic Council, composed of four faculty members and six students, had responsibility for dispensing student appropriations and income from ticket sales. The Board of Trustees' own Athletic Committee would govern the hiring and payment of coaches. The new system was intended to unite the intramural and intercollegiate athletics programs, reinstate faculty into athletic governance, give more responsibility to students, and to create a freshman football program. David C. Morrow, former football coach and member of the Athletic Committee dissented, advocating for a return to the scholarship model, blaming the waning alumni interest in the college on the team's poor performance. However, the College's indebtedness at that time was $133,000, most of which was the result of player subsidization. At that time, athletics took up half of the student activity fee. In an attempt to stabilize the fiscal picture, the athletic budget was cut significantly, with freshman football and boxing discontinued. The plan worked, and by the 1940s, athletic finances were stabilized. This signaled the end of the football team's games against larger schools.

The football team was disbanded for the most of World War II, and Pete Henry, the athletic director took over football coaching duties for 1942 and 1945. Things began to look up by the late 1940s, when Donora-native "Deacon" Dan Towler chose W&J over offers from larger football programs. The backfield in 1948 was nicknamed the "Four Gazelles." While still dominant, with the third highest scoring total in the country, that group would have been one of the most best backfields in the nation if not for a plague of injuries. The fifties and sixties were generally poor for W&J football, as President Boyd Crumrine Patterson, faced with budget deficits, limited athletic scholarships to "on-need" and spread the remaining scholarships among more sports. In one bright spot, Art Massaro was drafted by the Pittsburgh Steelers in the 29th Round of the 1953 NFL draft, making him and Deacon Dan only the 2 W&J players ever drafted. Deacon Dan earned All-Pro honors in 4 of his 6 years in with the Rams, before leaving to become a Methodist minister. One other member of the "Four Gazelles", Jack Sourbeer, was recruited by the LA Rams in 1951, but declined their offer to attend medical school instead.

From 1956 to 1972 Washington & Jefferson competed in the NCAA College Division. In 1958, the Presidents, who had previously been independent and not members of any conference, joined the Presidents' Athletic Conference. The teams of the seventies were similarly poor, save for a PAC championship in 1970 and a second-place finish in 1971. When the NCAA re-aligned its football conference structure in 1973, W&J joined Division III.

=== Resurgence in Division III (1982–present) ===
In 1982, John "Lucky" Luckhardt took over the team and began a resurgence. Led by freshman running back A.J. Pagano, the Presidents qualified for the 1984 NCAA Division III playoffs, the team's first post-season appearance since the 1922 Rose Bowl. The 1985 team was nationally ranked and barely missed taking the PAC championship. In 1986, they won the PAC and secured another bid the NCAA Division III playoffs, only to lose to Susquehanna University. The undefeated and united 1987 team won the PAC and advanced to the Division III playoffs, where they defeated Allegheny College in ten inches of snow in a game called "one of the greatest NCAA Division III playoffs ever played." The teams of 1988 and 1989 were also successful, with both teams securing a share of the PAC Championship and the 1989 team making the Division III playoffs. In 1992, the Presidents, led by running back Chris Babirad, advanced to the NCAA Division III National Football Championship Game, only to lose to University of Wisconsin–La Crosse. The team returned to the Division III Championship game in 1994, losing to Albion College.

The Presidents under John Banaszak and Mike Sirianni have won 18 out of the last 21 PAC Championships and advanced to the NCAA Division III playoffs 17 times. Since 2000, the team has a 79–14 record, which is the fourth-most victories during that time period in D-III.

== Championships ==
=== National Championships ===
Washington & Jefferson was retrospectively named national champion by 1 NCAA-designated major selector in the 1930s. The Presidents do not claim this title according to their official website.

| Year | Coach | Selector | Record |
|---|---|---|---|
| 1921 | Greasy Neale | Boand System+ | 10–0–1 |

+: co-champion selection with California and Lafayette

=== Conference Championships ===
Since joining the Presidents' Athletic Conference in 1958, the Presidents have won 28 conference championships, with the most recent occurring in 2025.

== Postseason appearances ==
=== NCAA Division III playoffs ===
The Presidents have made twenty-nine appearances in the NCAA Division III playoffs, with a combined record of 23–28. They finished as national runner-ups in the NCAA Division III Championship Game (Stagg Bowl) in 1992 and 1994.

| Year | Round | Opponent | Result |
|---|---|---|---|
| 1984 | Quarterfinals; Semifinals | Randolph–Macon; Central (IA) | W, 22–21; L, 0–20 |
| 1986 | First Round | Susquehanna | L, 20–28 |
| 1987 | First Round | Allegheny; Emory & Henry | W, 23–17 ^{OT} L, 16–23 |
| 1989 | First Round | Ferrum | L, 7–41 |
| 1990 | First Round; Quarterfinals | Ferrum; Lycoming | W, 10–7; L, 0–24 |
| 1991 | First Round | Lycoming | L, 16–18 |
| 1992 | First Round; Quarterfinals; Semifinals; Stagg Bowl | Lycoming; Emory & Henry; Rowan; Wisconsin–La Crosse | W, 33–0; W, 51–15; W, 18–13; L, 12–16 |
| 1993 | First Round; Quarterfinals; Semifinals | Moravian; Frostburg State; Rowan | W, 10–7; W, 28–7; L, 16–23 |
| 1994 | First Round; Quarterfinals; Semifinals; Stagg Bowl | Trinity (TX); Widener; Ithaca; Albion | W, 28–0; W, 37–21; W, 23–19; L, 15–38 |
| 1995 | First Round; Quarterfinals; Semifinals | Emory & Henry; Lycoming; Rowan | W, 35–16; W, 48–0; L, 15–28 |
| 1996 | First Round | Albright | L, 17–31 |
| 1999 | First Round; Second Round | Lycoming; Hardin–Simmons | W, 14–7; L, 3–51 |
| 2000 | First Round | Bridgewater (VA) | L, 42–59 |
| 2001 | First Round; Second Round | Western Maryland; Widener | W, 24–21; L, 30–46 |
| 2002 | First Round; Second Round | Christopher Newport; Trinity (TX) | W, 24–10; L, 10–45 |
| 2004 | First Round; Second Round; Quarterfinals | Bridgewater (VA); Christopher Newport; Mary Hardin–Baylor | W, 55–48 ^{2OT} W, 24–14; L, 16–52 |
| 2005 | First Round | Bridgewater (VA) | L, 21–30 |
| 2006 | First Round; Second Round | Christopher Newport; Mary Hardin–Baylor | W, 27–23; L, 27–30 |
| 2007 | First Round | North Carolina Wesleyan | L, 34–35 ^{OT} |
| 2008 | First Round; Second Round; Quarterfinals | Christopher Newport; Millsaps; Mary Hardin–Baylor | W, 35–29; W, 35–20; L, 7–63 |
| 2009 | First Round | Mount Union | L, 0–55 |
| 2012 | First Round | Johns Hopkins | L, 10–42 |
| 2013 | First Round | Mount Union | L, 20–34 |
| 2014 | First Round; Second Round | Wittenberg; Mount Union | W, 41–25; L, 0–67 |
| 2017 | First Round; Second Round | Johns Hopkins; Frostburg State | W, 31–28; L, 23–46 |
| 2018 | First Round | Centre (KY) | L, 13–54 |
| 2024 | Second Round | Randolph–Macon | L, 22–38 |
| 2025 | First Round | Susquehanna | L, 32–38 |
| 2026F | Second Round | Christopher Newport | TBP |

=== Bowl games ===
The Presidents participated in 1 FBS-level bowl game, being selected for the 1922 Rose Bowl.

| Season | Coach | Bowl | Opponent | Result |
|---|---|---|---|---|
| 1921 | Greasy Neale | Rose Bowl | California | T, 0–0 |

In addition, the Presidents have participated in 7 ECAC Bowl Series games, with a record of 6–1.

| Season | Coach | Bowl | Opponent | Result |
|---|---|---|---|---|
| 2003 | Mike Sirianni | Southwest Bowl | Wilkes | W, 41–19 |
| 2010 | Mike Sirianni | Southwest Bowl | Franklin & Marshall | W, 54–41 |
| 2016 | Mike Sirianni | Presidents Bowl | Brockport | W, 38–31 |
| 2019 | Mike Sirianni | Asa S. Bushnell Bowl | Ithaca | W, 20–17 |
| 2021 | Mike Sirianni | Clayton Champman Bowl | Brockport | L, 7–20 |
| 2022 | Mike Sirianni | Asa S. Bushnell Bowl | Hobart | W, 35–18 |
| 2023 | Mike Sirianni | James Lynah Bowl | Merchant Marine | W, 46–21 |

== Alumni and notable players ==
Members of the football team has received individual honors, including 12 conference MVP awards and more than 120 First Team All-Conference selections. Six football players have been named to the Associated Press All-American Team and four players received an NCAA post-graduate scholarship. Additionally, W&J's football team has produced more than 50 All-Americans and 30 Academic All-Americans in the past 40 years.

A number of W&J players have achieved notoriety in both collegiate and professional football. Halfback Johnny Spiegel, who was the leading scorer in college football in 1914, was named an All American in 1913 and 1914. Center Burleigh Cruikshank joined Spiegel as an All American in 1914. Fred Heyman was named to the 1915 All American team. "Scrubby" McCreight was on the 1917 and 1918 All American teams. College Football Hall of Fame and Pro Football Hall of Fame member Pete Henry was a member of the 1917, a consensus All American in 1918, and a consensus All American in 1919. Rose Bowl MVP Russ Stein, a member of the 1921 All-American team, was a member of the Pottsville Maroons when they won the controversial 1925 NFL Championship. Edgar Garbisch, who played at W&J from 1921 to 1924, was elected to the College Football Hall of Fame. In 1922, Lee Spillers, Herb Kopf, and Al Crook were named All Americans. Chet Widerquist was named to the 1923 All American Team. Bill Amos, who would later coach the W&J football team, was a member of the 1926 and 1927 All American Teams. Future Pittsburgh Steelers head coach Jap Douds was a member of the 1927, 1928, and 1929 All American Teams. "Deacon" Dan Towler was a "Little All American" and Cum Laude graduate of W&J. had a seven-year professional career with the Los Angeles Rams in the early 1950s, and was named an All-Pro three times. Pittsburgh Mayor Luke Ravenstahl is still the all-time leading placekicker in the college's history.

== Coaches ==
The team has had 30 head coaches coach since it started playing organized football in 1890. They played their first season without a head coach. Three coaches have led Washington & Jefferson College to NCAA Division III playoffs: John Luckhardt, John Banaszak, and Mike Sirianni. Those three coaches, plus Chuck Ream, coached teams that won the Presidents' Athletic Conference Championship. Greasy Neale's 1921 team played in the 1922 Rose Bowl, where they tied the heavily favored California Golden Bears. John Luckhardt is the all-time leader in seasons coached (17), games coached (176), and wins (137). Current coach Mike Sirianni has the highest winning percentage (.854) of any coach since the 1890s. During his two years as head coach, Charles Nelson has the worst winning percentage (.031). Four coaches—Greasy Neale, John Heisman, Andrew Kerr and Pete Henry—have been inducted into the College Football Hall of Fame. Two of those coaches, Greasy Neale and Pete Henry have been inducted into the Pro Football Hall of Fame. The current coach is Mike Sirianni, whose first season was in 2003.

== Tradition and lore ==
=== Doc Donehoo ===
Dr. James Franklin "Doc" Donehoo never missed a game as the team's physician from 1912 until 1950, a total of 314 straight games, which was a record at the time. At a halftime ceremony on October 23, 1948, to commemorate his 300th straight game, he was called the #1 football fan. Donehoo graduated from W&J in 1890 and University of Pennsylvania School of Medicine in 1893.

=== Rivalries ===
During its history, W&J's football team has had rivalries with several schools, including Lafayette College, West Virginia University, and the University of Pittsburgh. The rivalry with West Virginia University was heightened by the fact that Morgantown was located in a dry county, making the trip to nearby Washington for a game against W&J a raucous event for students. The first verse of Hail, West Virginia, the WVU fight song, refers to W&J with the line, "Others may be black or crimson, but for us it’s Gold and Blue." However, it is the W&J rivalry with nearby Bethany College is the oldest and most prolific, with the Presidents holding an all-time record of 75–21 in the rivalry that dates to 1896.

== Season-by-season records ==
The team was quite successful in its early years, ending each of its first 20 seasons with winning records. David C. Morrow served as head coach three times for a total of eight seasons across three different decades. The team went on hiatus for two seasons during World War II. In 1970, the Presidents won their first Presidents' Athletic Conference championship. John Luckhardt coached for 17 seasons. Under his leadership, the team began a 26-year streak of winning seasons, running from 1984 to 2009.

== See also ==
- List of NCAA Division III football programs
- List of undefeated NCAA Division I football teams
