= Mike Sirianni =

American football player and coach (born 1972)

Current position
- Title: Head coach
- Team: Washington & Jefferson
- Conference: PAC
- Record: 208–50

Biographical details
- Born: March 22, 1972 (age 54); Jamestown, New York, U.S.

Playing career
- 1990–1993: Mount Union
- Position: Wide receiver

Coaching career (HC unless noted)
- 1994–1997: Mount Union (WR/TE)
- 1998: Wilkes (QB/WR)
- 1999–2002: Washington & Jefferson (OC/QB)
- 2003–present: Washington & Jefferson

Head coaching record
- Overall: 208–50
- Bowls: 5–2
- Tournaments: 7–13 (NCAA D-III playoffs)

Accomplishments and honors

Championships
- 11 PAC (2004, 2006–2008, 2012–2014, 2017–2018, 2024–2025)

Mike Sirianni (born March 22, 1972) is an American college football coach and former player. He is the head football coach for Washington & Jefferson College, a position he has held since 2003 after succeeding Pittsburgh Steelers great John Banaszak. Sirianni has compiled a record of 101–24 in 11 seasons as head coach. Sirianni's winning percentage of .846 is second best among active head coaches with at least five years of experience in NCAA football, trailing only that of Mount Union coach Larry Kehres, for whom he played. In his first 11 years of coaching at Washington & Jefferson, he won PAC Coach of the Year five times.

Sirianni attended Mount Union College, where he was a wide receiver on the school's first NCAA Division III Football Championship-winning team in 1993. He also competed on the school's track and field team, where he was a four-time conference champion in the triple jump. He worked as an assistant coach for Mount Union in 1996 and 1997 on teams that won two more NCAA Division III national titles.

Mike is the brother of Philadelphia Eagles head coach Nick Sirianni.

== Head coaching record ==
Year	Team	Overall	Conference	Standing	Bowl/playoffs	D3^{#}	AFCA^{°}
Washington & Jefferson Presidents (Presidents' Athletic Conference) (2003–present)
2003	Washington & Jefferson	9–2	4–1	2nd			
2004	Washington & Jefferson	12–1	5–0	1st	L NCAA Division III Quarterfinal		
2005	Washington & Jefferson	9–2	5–1	2nd	L NCAA Division III First Round		
2006	Washington & Jefferson	10–2	6–0	1st	L NCAA Division III Second Round		
2007	Washington & Jefferson	10–1	6–0	1st	L NCAA Division III First Round		
2008	Washington & Jefferson	11–2	5–1	T–1st	L NCAA Division III Quarterfinal		
2009	Washington & Jefferson	9–2	5–1	2nd	L NCAA Division III First Round		
2010	Washington & Jefferson	9–2	6–1	2nd	W Southwest		
2011	Washington & Jefferson	6–4	5–3	2nd	L Clayton Chapman		
2012	Washington & Jefferson	8–3	7–1	T–1st	L NCAA Division III First Round		
2013	Washington & Jefferson	8–3	7–1	T–1st	L NCAA Division III First Round		
2014	Washington & Jefferson	10–2	7–1	T–1st	L NCAA Division III Second Round		
2015	Washington & Jefferson	8–2	6–2	T–3rd			
2016	Washington & Jefferson	9–2	6–2	T–3rd	W Presidents		
2017	Washington & Jefferson	11–1	8–0	1st	L NCAA Division III Second Round		
2018	Washington & Jefferson	9–2	8–1	1st	L NCAA Division III First Round		
2019	Washington & Jefferson	8–3	7–2	4th	W Asa S. Bushnell		
2020–21	Washington & Jefferson	3–1	2–0	1st			
2021	Washington & Jefferson	8–3	7–2	2nd	L Clayton Chapman		
2022	Washington & Jefferson	9–2	6–2	T–2nd	W Asa S. Bushnell		
2023	Washington & Jefferson	9–2	8–2	3rd	W James Lynah		
2024	Washington & Jefferson	9–2	9–1	T–1st	L NCAA Division III Second Round	18	19
2025	Washington & Jefferson	8–3	8–0	1st	L NCAA Division III First Round		
2026	Washington & Jefferson	6–1	5–0				
Washington & Jefferson:		208–50	148–25				
Total:		208–50					
National championship Conference title Conference division title or championship game berth
