= John Banaszak =

American college sports player and coach (born 1950)

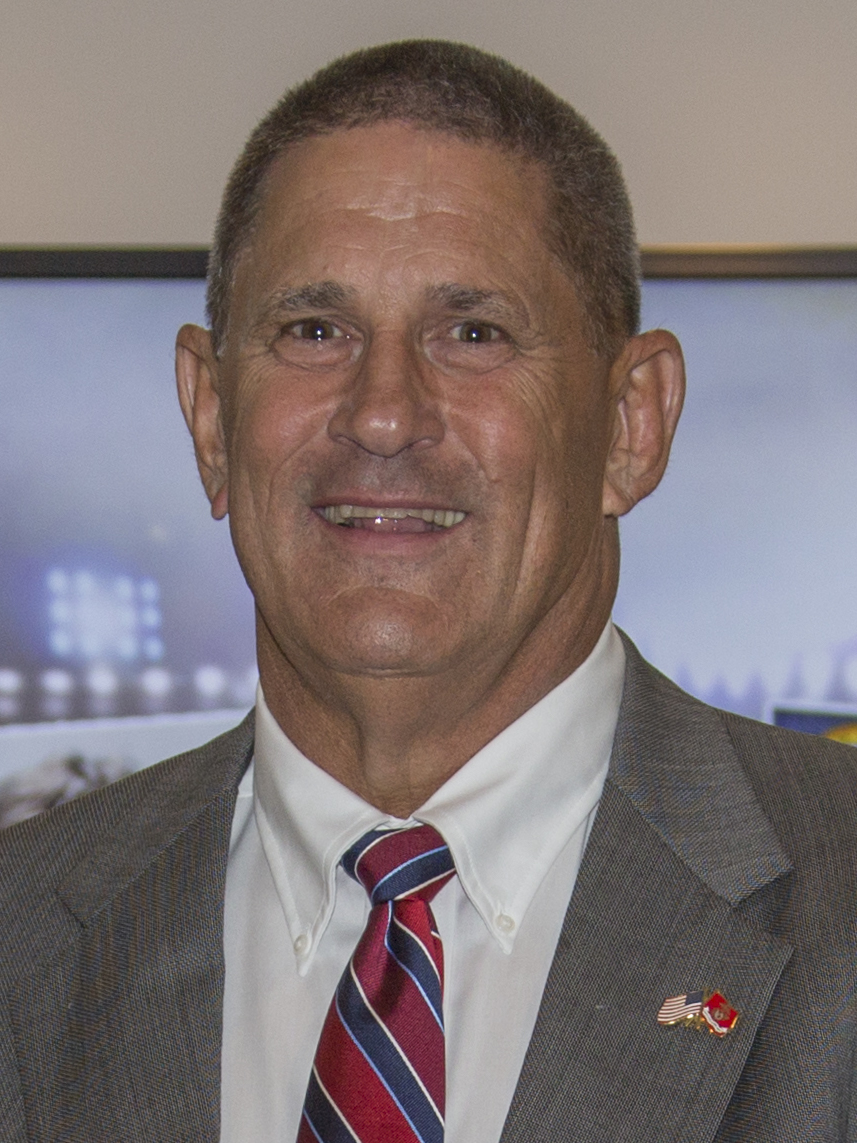
- Banaszak in 2017

Biographical details
- Born: August 24, 1950 (age 76); Seven Hills, Ohio, U.S.

Playing career

Football
- 1972–1974: Eastern Michigan
- 1975–1981: Pittsburgh Steelers
- 1983–1984: Michigan Panthers
- 1985: Memphis Showboats
- Positions: Defensive end, defensive tackle

Coaching career (HC unless noted)

Football
- 1995–1998: Washington & Jefferson (DC)
- 1999–2002: Washington & Jefferson
- 2003–2007: Robert Morris (ST/DL)
- 2008–2013: Robert Morris (AHC/ST/DL)
- 2014–2017: Robert Morris

Baseball
- 1995–1999: Washington & Jefferson

Head coaching record
- Overall: 46–42 (football); 56–84 (baseball)
- Tournaments: Football; 3–4 (NCAA D-III playoffs)

Accomplishments and honors

Championships
- 3× Super Bowl champion (X, XIII, XIV); Football 4 PAC (1999–2002)

John Arthur Banaszak (/ˈbænəˌzæk/ BAN-ə-ZACK; born August 24, 1950) is an American football coach and former player. He was formerly the head football coach at Robert Morris University. Banaszak played in the National Football League (NFL) with the Pittsburgh Steelers from 1975 to 1981. He is a three-time Super Bowl champion. Banaszak was a starter at right defensive end for the Steelers in Super Bowl XIII and Super Bowl XIV. He later played in the United States Football League (USFL), winning a championship as a starting defensive end for the Michigan Panthers in 1983. Banaszak played for Michigan in 1983 and 1984 and for the Memphis Showboats in 1985.

Benaszak served in the United States Marine Corps on active duty from 1969 to 1971 and in a reserve status from 1971 to 1975. He was inducted into the Marine Corps Sports Hall of Fame in 2017.

After his football career, Banaszak owned a chain of oil change centers and worked for the Peters Township Recreation Department. In 1995, Banaszak became defensive coordinator of Washington & Jefferson College football team. He was promoted to head coach in 1999. He was fired from W&J after publicly exploring other coaching jobs. He left the college as the third-most winning coach in school history.

Banaszak was an assistant football coach under Joe Walton at Robert Morris University in Pittsburgh. He officially began his duties as head coach at Robert Morris in December 2013.

Banaszak was hospitalized in Pittsburgh on April 23, 2009, in serious condition. It was first reported that he had suffered multiple aneurysms. That was later found to be incorrect and he may have suffered from an overdose of aspirin which was being taken for neck pain.

== Head coaching record ==
=== Football ===
Year	Team	Overall	Conference	Standing	Bowl/playoffs
Washington & Jefferson Presidents (Presidents' Athletic Conference) (1999–2002)
1999	Washington & Jefferson	9–3	4–0	1st	L NCAA Division III Second Round
2000	Washington & Jefferson	9–2	4–0	1st	L NCAA Division III First Round
2001	Washington & Jefferson	11–1	4–0	1st	L NCAA Division III Second Round
2002	Washington & Jefferson	9–3	5–0	1st	L NCAA Division III Second Round
Washington & Jefferson:		38–9	17–0		
Robert Morris Colonials (Northeast Conference) (2014–2017)
2014	Robert Morris	1–10	1–5	T–6th	
2015	Robert Morris	4–7	2–4	6th	
2016	Robert Morris	2–9	1–5	T–5th	
2017	Robert Morris	2–9	0–6	7th	
Robert Morris:		8–34	3–19		
Total:		46–42			
