= David C. Morrow (American football) =

American football players and coach (1882–1953)

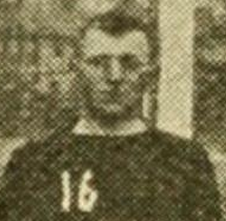
- Morrow c. 1920 coaching at Washington & Jefferson

Biographical details
- Born: August 27, 1882; Washington County, Pennsylvania, U.S.
- Died: February 27, 1953 (aged 70); Pittsburgh, Pennsylvania, U.S.

Playing career
- 1905: Bethany (WV)
- Position: Tackle

Coaching career (HC unless noted)
- 1908–1911: Washington & Jefferson
- 1919–1920: Washington & Jefferson
- 1923: Washington & Jefferson (line)
- 1924–1925: Washington & Jefferson
- 1929: Bethany (WV)

Head coaching record
- Overall: 49–27–5

David Campsey Morrow (August 27, 1882 – February 27, 1953) was an American football player and coach. He served as the head football coach at Washington and Jefferson College (1908–1911, 1919–1920, 1924–1925) and at Bethany College in West Virginia (1929), compiling a career college football record of 49–27–5. He attended Bethany College and graduated from Washington & Jefferson. He was one of the most widely known coaches in the eastern United States. The New York Times called him "one of the best football coaches in the United States." He was known for his skill in developing the line. He spent a total of 20 years at Washington & Jefferson.

Morrow was later the manager of the South Pittsburgh Water Co. He died at the age of 70, on February 27, 1953, at St. Joseph Hospital in Pittsburgh, Pennsylvania.

== Head coaching record ==
Year	Team	Overall	Conference	Standing	Bowl/playoffs
Washington & Jefferson Red and Black (Independent) (1908–1911)
1908	Washington & Jefferson	10–2–1			
1909	Washington & Jefferson	8–1–1			
1910	Washington & Jefferson	3–4–1			
1911	Washington & Jefferson	6–4			
Washington & Jefferson Presidents (Independent) (1919–1920)
1919	Washington & Jefferson	5–2			
1920	Washington & Jefferson	6–3–1			
Washington & Jefferson Presidents (Independent) (1924–1925)
1924	Washington & Jefferson	7–2			
1925	Washington & Jefferson	6–2–1			
Washington & Jefferson:		48–20–5			
Bethany Bison (Tri-State Conference / West Virginia Athletic Conference) (1929)
1929	Bethany	1–7	0–2 / 1–3	5th / T–9th	
Bethany:		1–7	1–5		
Total:		49–27–5			

== See also ==
- List of college football head coaches with non-consecutive tenure
