= Greasy Neale =

American athlete and coach (1891–1973)

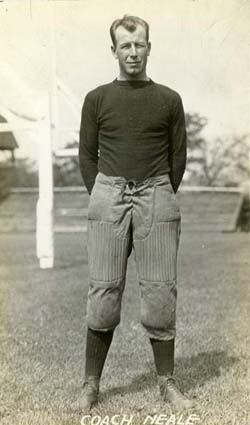
- Neale as Washington & Jefferson football coach, c. 1922

Biographical details
- Born: November 5, 1891; Parkersburg, West Virginia, U.S.
- Died: November 2, 1973 (aged 81); Lake Worth, Florida, U.S.

Playing career

Football
- c. 1913: West Virginia Wesleyan
- 1917: Canton Bulldogs
- 1918: Dayton Triangles
- 1919: Massillon Tigers
- Position: End

Coaching career (HC unless noted)

Football
- 1915: Muskingum
- 1916–1917: West Virginia Wesleyan
- 1918: Dayton Triangles
- 1919–1920: Marietta
- 1921–1922: Washington & Jefferson
- 1923–1928: Virginia
- 1930: Ironton Tanks
- 1931–1933: West Virginia
- 1934–1940: Yale (backs)
- 1941–1950: Philadelphia Eagles

Basketball
- 1919–1921: Marietta

Baseball
- 1923–1928: Virginia
- 1927–1928: Clarksburg Generals
- 1929: St. Louis Cardinals (3rd base)
- 1929: Rochester Red Wings (3rd base)
- 1930: Clarksburg Generals

Head coaching record
- Overall: 82–54–11 (college football); 26–11 (college basketball); 80–73–2 (college baseball); 66–44–5 (NFL)
- Tournaments: 3–1 (NFL playoffs)

Accomplishments and honors

Championships
- 2 Ohio League (1917, 1918); 2 NFL (1948, 1949)

Awards
- Pro Football Hall of Fame (1969); Philadelphia Eagles Hall of Fame (1987)
- College Football Hall of Fame; Inducted in 1967 (profile)

Baseball career
- Outfielder
- Batted: Left Threw: Right

MLB debut
- April 12, 1916, for the Cincinnati Reds

Last MLB appearance
- June 13, 1924, for the Cincinnati Reds

MLB statistics
- Batting average: .259
- Home runs: 8
- Runs batted in: 200
- Stolen bases: 139
- Stats at Baseball Reference

Teams
- Cincinnati Reds (1916–1920); Philadelphia Phillies (1921); Cincinnati Reds (1921–1922, 1924)

Career highlights and awards
- World Series champion (1919)

Alfred Earle "Greasy" Neale (November 5, 1891 – November 2, 1973) was an American football and baseball player and coach. Neale was an end for West Virginia Wesleyan in the 1910s before becoming involved in professional baseball and football as both player and coach. He served as the regular outfielder for the Cincinnati Reds from 1916 to 1920, which included leading the team in hits in the 1919 World Series, the first championship in team history. He also spent time playing in the Ohio League as an end, playing a season each for Canton, Dayton, and Massillon from 1917 to 1919. He stopped playing baseball and football by the 1920s to focus on coaching, coaching for five different teams from 1915 to 1922 (which included coaching Washington & Jefferson to the 1921 Rose Bowl) before settling with the University of Virginia, where he coached football and baseball from 1923 to 1928.

Neale jumped from job to job, coaching minor league baseball to independent professional ball. In sixteen seasons of coaching college football, he went 82–54–11. Neale served as the backs coach at Yale from 1934 to 1940 before being hired to coach the Philadelphia Eagles of the National Football League. They won just two games each in his first two seasons but steadily rose up the ranks, which culminated in 1947 with a division championship, the first one in team history. They lost in the 1947 NFL Championship Game but returned to the championship in 1948 and got revenge on Chicago to win their first NFL Championship. The 1949 campaign saw them go 11–1 (in addition to being a record for wins not broken for 30 years, it still ranks as the best season in winning percentage in team history). They defeated Los Angeles to win their second consecutive championship.

Neale concluded his tenure in 1950; in ten seasons as coach, he went 66–44–5. Neale retired from coaching and was inducted into the College Football Hall of Fame in 1967 and the Pro Football Hall of Fame in 1969 for his contributions to the sport.

== Early life ==
Neale was born on November 5, 1891, in Parkersburg, West Virginia. Although writers eventually assumed that Neale got his nickname, "Greasy", from his elusiveness on the football field, it actually arose during his youth, from a name-calling joust with a friend.

== Playing career ==
=== Baseball ===
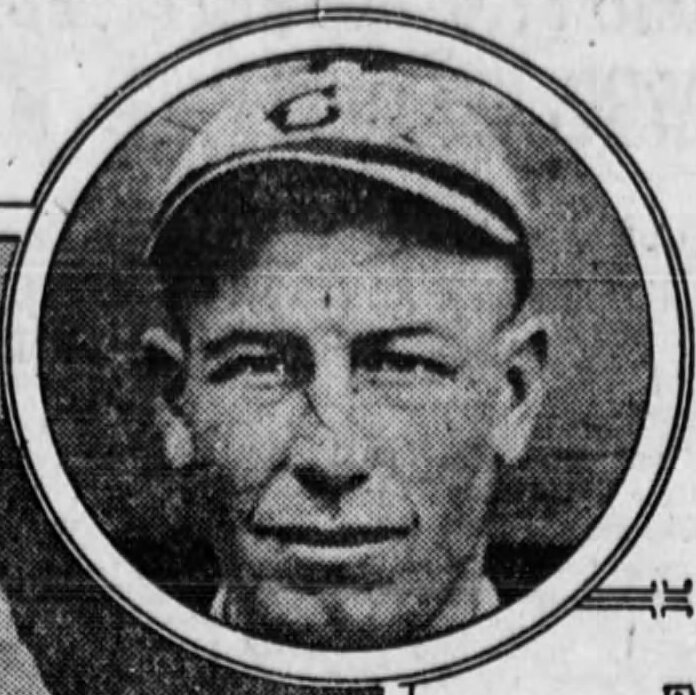
Neale with the Cincinnati Reds of the MLB, c. 1919

Neale played Major League Baseball as an outfielder with the Cincinnati Reds between 1916 and 1924 and briefly with the Philadelphia Phillies for part of the 1921 season. Neale was the starting right fielder for the championship-winning 1919 Reds. He batted .357 in the 1919 World Series and led the Reds with ten hits in their eight-game series win over the scandalous White Sox.

Neale spent all but 22 games of his baseball career with the Reds. He had a career batting average of .259 with 8 home runs, 200 RBI, and 139 stolen bases, and finished in the top ten in stolen bases in the National League four times. When football season came around, often he would leave baseball and fulfill his football duties (albeit playing about 90% of a baseball season most years, with the exception of 1919 when he played the entire season, including the World Series).

=== Football ===
Neale also played professional football in the Ohio League with the Canton Bulldogs in 1917, the Dayton Triangles in 1918, and the Massillon Tigers in 1919. He starred as an end on Jim Thorpe's pre-World War I Canton Bulldogs as well as the Dayton Triangles in 1918 and Massillon Tigers in 1919. He coached the Triangles in 1918.

== Coaching career ==
=== College ===
Neale began his coaching career while still a professional player. He served as the head football coach at Muskingum College (1915), West Virginia Wesleyan College (1916–1917), Marietta College (1919–1920), Washington & Jefferson College (1921–1922), the University of Virginia (1923–1928), and West Virginia University (1931–1933), compiling a career college football record of 82–54–11. He coached basketball for two seasons at Marietta (1919–1921) as well, amassing a record of 26–11. He also served as an assistant football coach with Yale Bulldogs football for seven seasons (1934–1940).

At Washington & Jefferson, he led his 1921 squad to the Rose Bowl, where the Presidents played the California Golden Bears to a scoreless tie. At Virginia, Neale was also the head baseball coach from 1923 to 1928, tallying a mark of 80–73–2.

=== Baseball ===
In 1927 and 1928, Neale managed the Clarksburg Generals of the Middle Atlantic League. He returned to the club late into the 1928 season.

In 1929, Neale joined the coaching staff of the St. Louis Cardinals. He started the season as the team's third base coach, but was demoted to the Rochester Red Wings along with manager Billy Southworth on July 24, 1929. The following month he was replaced by Ray Blades and became a scout for the Cardinals.

In 1930, Neale once again managed the Generals.

=== Independent football ===
Neale later coached the independent professional Ironton Tanks. He and Tanks quarterback Glenn Presnell claimed victories against the NFL's second-place New York Giants and third-place Chicago Bears in 1930, however the team folded in 1931.

=== Return to college ===
In 1931, Neale returned to college coaching as the head football coach at West Virginia. In 1934, he became the backfield coach at Yale, where his brother, Widdy, was the director of intramural athletics.

=== Professional ===
Neale moved to the National Football League (NFL), to serve as the head coach of the Philadelphia Eagles from 1941 to 1950. From 1944 through 1949, Neale's Eagles finished second three times and in first place three times. The Eagles won the NFL Championship in 1948 and again in 1949, and became the first team to win back-to-back titles since the 1940 and 1941 Chicago Bears by shutting out their opponents, beating the Chicago Cardinals 7–0 in the snow ridden 1948 NFL Championship Game and the Los Angeles Rams 14–0 in the 1949 NFL Championship Game in a driving rain storm. It was the last championship for the Eagles until 1960. His offense was led by the passing of quarterback Tommy Thompson, the pass catching of future Hall of Fame end Pete Pihos, and the running of another Hall of Famer, Steve Van Buren. He tallied a mark of 66–44–5 including playoff games in his ten seasons with the club. Neale was inducted into the College Football Hall of Fame in 1967 and the Pro Football Hall of Fame in 1969. Both inductions recognized his coaching career.

Neale died in Lake Worth Beach, Florida, at the age of 81 and was later interred in Parkersburg Memorial Gardens in West Virginia.

== Head coaching record ==
=== College football ===
Year	Team	Overall	Conference	Standing	Bowl/playoffs
Muskingum Fighting Muskies (Independent) (1915)
1915	Muskingum	2–4–1			
Muskingum:		2–4–1			
West Virginia Wesleyan Bobcats (Independent) (1916–1917)
1916	West Virginia Wesleyan	5–6			
1917	West Virginia Wesleyan	5–2			
West Virginia Wesleyan:		10–8			
Marietta Pioneers (Independent) (1919–1920)
1919	Marietta	7–0 (Note: R. L. Cooke coached the first game of the season.)			
1920	Marietta	7–1			
Marietta:		14–1			
Washington & Jefferson Presidents (Independent) (1921–1922)
1921	Washington & Jefferson	10–0–1			T Rose
1922	Washington & Jefferson	6–3–1			
Washington & Jefferson:		16–3–2			
Virginia Cavaliers (Southern Conference) (1923–1928)
1923	Virginia	3–5–1	0–3–1	17th	
1924	Virginia	5–4	3–2	T–6th	
1925	Virginia	7–1–1	4–1–1	T–5th	
1926	Virginia	6–2–2	4–2–1	6th	
1927	Virginia	5–4	4–4	T–8th	
1928	Virginia	2–6–1	1–6	T–20th	
Virginia:		28–22–5	16–18–3		
West Virginia Mountaineers (Independent) (1931–1933)
1931	West Virginia	4–6			
1932	West Virginia	5–5			
1933	West Virginia	3–5–3			
West Virginia:		12–16–3			
Total:		82–54–11			

=== NFL ===
Team	Year	Regular season					Postseason			
Team	Year	Won	Lost	Ties	Win %	Finish	Won	Lost	Win %	Result
PHI	1941	2	8	1	.227	4th in NFL Eastern	–	–	–	–
PHI	1942	2	9	0	.182	5th in NFL Eastern	–	–	–	–
PHI-PIT	1943	5	4	1	.550	3rd in NFL Eastern	–	–	–	–
PHI	1944	7	1	2	.800	2nd in NFL Eastern	–	–	–	–
PHI	1945	7	3	0	.700	2nd in NFL Eastern	–	–	–	–
PHI	1946	6	5	0	.545	2nd in NFL Eastern	–	–	–	–
PHI	1947	8	4	0	.667	1st in NFL Eastern	1	1	.500	Lost to Chicago Cardinals in NFL Championship
PHI	1948	9	2	1	.792	1st in NFL Eastern	1	0	1.000	Won NFL Championship
PHI	1949	11	1	0	.917	1st in NFL Eastern	1	0	1.000	Won NFL Championship
PHI	1950	6	6	0	.500	3rd in NFL Eastern	–	–	–	–
PHI Total		63	43	5	.590		3	1	.750	
Total		63	43	5	.590		3	1	.750	

== See also ==
- List of St. Louis Cardinals coaches
