= 1922 Rose Bowl =

American college football game

1922 Tournament East-West football game
- 8th Rose Bowl Game
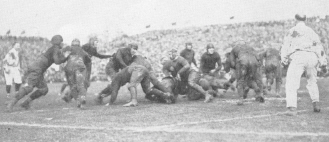
Washington & Jefferson Presidents	California Golden Bears
(10–0)	(9–0)
Independent	PCC
0	0
Head coach: Greasy Neale	Head coach: Andy Smith
	1	2	3	4	Total
Washington & Jefferson	0	0	0	0	0
California	0	0	0	0	0
- Date: January 2, 1922
- Season: 1921
- Stadium: Tournament Park
- Location: Pasadena, California
- MVP: Russell Stein (Washington & Jefferson, T)
- Favorite: Cal 14–21 point favorite
- Attendance: 50,000

The 1922 Rose Bowl was a college football bowl game played on January 2, 1922, between the Washington & Jefferson Presidents (W&J) and the California Golden Bears. It holds several distinctions including being the only scoreless Rose Bowl Game, the first tie in a Rose Bowl, the first African-American quarterback to play in the Rose Bowl (Charles Fremont West from Washington & Jefferson), the first freshman to play in a Rose Bowl (Herb Kopf of Washington and Jefferson), and Hal Erickson (W&J) became the only man ever to play in two Rose Bowls (1919 and 1922), with two teams (Great Lakes Navy and W&J), without losing. It was also the last to be played at Tournament Park and to be officially known as the Tournament East-West Football Game, and with only 450 students at the time, Washington & Jefferson College was the smallest school to ever play in a Rose Bowl.

== Game summary ==
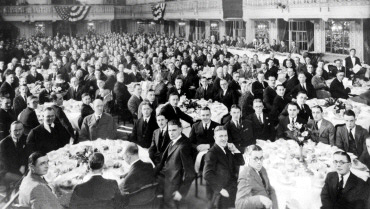
The W&J team is feted at the William Penn Hotel upon their return from the game.

The Cal team was highly favored in this game, causing one sportswriter to say "All I know about Washington and Jefferson is that they're both dead."

The 1921 Washington & Jefferson team, coached by Greasy Neale, went 10–0 in the regular season, defeating powerhouses Pitt, University of Detroit, and Syracuse. The 7–0 victory over rival Pitt was celebrated with a day of canceled classes and bonfire with inspiration speeches in front of the Washington County Courthouse. As the best team from the east, W&J was invited to the 1922 Rose Bowl to play the best team from the west: the undefeated and heavily favored California Golden Bears. The Red and Black could only afford to send 11 men on the cross-country trip and graduate manager Robert M. Murphy mortgaged his house to pay his family's way. Thus, W&J would be the last Rose Bowl team to play the same 11 men the entire game. During the train ride to Pasadena, in which Greasy Neale continued to prepare his men, one player caught pneumonia and could not finish the journey. Another player who had secretly stowed away on the train was given the ill player's ticket and roster spot.

Cal had outscored their opponents on the season, 312–33, but the W&J defense held the Golden Bears' potent offense, led by Brick Muller, with no points and no completed passes, just two first downs, and only 49 yards rushing. In one of the most disputed plays in Rose Bowl history, a W&J rushing touchdown was overturned for an offside violation. The game was notable as the last time a "small school" would be represented in the Rose Bowl. W&J's team featured three Rose Bowl firsts: Herb Kopf was the first freshman to play, Charles Fremont West was the first African-American to play quarterback, and Hal Erickson became the only man ever to play in two Rose Bowls, with two teams, without losing. W&J's Russ Stein was named Player of the Game. He was inducted into the Rose Bowl Hall of Fame in 1991. The Red and Black finished the season with a share of the "mythical national championship," as determined by the Boand System.

== Records ==
- The only scoreless tie in Rose Bowl history, and one of the four scoreless ties in major bowl games.
- Fewest passing yards: 0
- Tied the record for fewest total points
