= John Luckhardt =

American football player and coach

Playing career

Football
- 1966: Purdue
- Position: Center

Coaching career (HC unless noted)

Football
- late 1960s: Purdue (GA)
- 1970–1972: Northern Illinois (WR/DB)
- 1973–1981: Lehigh (DC)
- 1982–1998: Washington & Jefferson
- 2002–2011: California (PA)

Baseball
- 1983–1986: Washington & Jefferson

Administrative career (AD unless noted)
- 1986–1998: Washington & Jefferson

Head coaching record
- Overall: 225–70–2 (football); 19–48–1 (baseball)
- Tournaments: Football; 13–11 (NCAA D-III playoffs); 8–5 (NCAA D-II playoffs)

Accomplishments and honors

Championships
- Football; 13 PAC (1984, 1986–1996, 1998); 1 PSAC (2008); 7 PSAC Western Division (2005–2011)
- College Football Hall of Fame; Inducted in 2022 (profile)

John Luckhardt is an American former football player and coach. He was the head football coach at California University of Pennsylvania in California, Pennsylvania from 2002 to 2011. Luckhardt coached at Washington & Jefferson College from 1982 to 1998, where he compiled a record of 137–37–2 and posted a school record for wins. He was elected to the Washington & Jefferson College Athletics Hall of Fame in 2007. Luckhardt was inducted into the College Football Hall of Fame as a coach in 2022.

Luckhardt attended Chartiers Valley High School. He then moved on to Purdue University and played for the Purdue Boilermakers, where he was a linebacker on the 1967 Rose Bowl team.

== Head coaching record ==
=== Football ===
Year	Team	Overall	Conference	Standing	Bowl/playoffs
Washington & Jefferson Presidents (Presidents' Athletic Conference) (1982–1998)
1982	Washington & Jefferson	4–5	3–4	T–5th	
1983	Washington & Jefferson	3–5–1	3–3–1	4th	
1984	Washington & Jefferson	9–2	6–0	1st	L NCAA Division III Quarterfinal
1985	Washington & Jefferson	8–1	5–1	2nd	
1986	Washington & Jefferson	8–2	6–0	1st	L NCAA Division III First Round
1987	Washington & Jefferson	10–1	6–0	1st	L NCAA Division III Quarterfinal
1988	Washington & Jefferson	7–1–1	6–0	1st	
1989	Washington & Jefferson	8–2	4–1	T–1st	L NCAA Division III First Round
1990	Washington & Jefferson	10–1	4–0	1st	L NCAA Division III Quarterfinal
1991	Washington & Jefferson	8–2	4–0	1st	L NCAA Division III First Round
1992	Washington & Jefferson	11–2	4–0	1st	L NCAA Division III Championship
1993	Washington & Jefferson	11–1	4–0	1st	L NCAA Division III Semifinal
1994	Washington & Jefferson	11–2	4–0	1st	L NCAA Division III Championship
1995	Washington & Jefferson	10–1	4–0	1st	L NCAA Division III Semifinal
1996	Washington & Jefferson	8–2	5–0	1st	L NCAA Division III First Round
1997	Washington & Jefferson	6–3	4–1	2nd	
1998	Washington & Jefferson	5–4	3–1	T–1st	
Washington & Jefferson:		137–37–2	75–11–1		
California Vulcans (Pennsylvania State Athletic Conference) (2002–2011)
2002	California	6–5	1–5	T–6th (West)	
2003	California	4–7	2–4	T–4th (West)	
2004	California	6–4	2–4	T–4th (West)	
2005	California	8–2	5–1	T–1st (West)	
2006	California	8–3	5–1	T–1st (West)	
2007	California	13–1	6–0	1st (West)	L NCAA Division II Semifinal
2008	California	12–2	7–0	1st (West)	L NCAA Division II Semifinal
2009	California	11–4	7–0	1st (West)	L NCAA Division II Semifinal
2010	California	10–2	6–1	T–1st (West)	L NCAA Division II First Round
2011	California	10–3	6–1	T–1st (West)	L NCAA Division II Second Round
California:		88–33	47–17		
Total:		225–70–2			
National championship Conference title Conference division title or championship game berth

== See also ==
- List of college football career coaching wins leaders
