= Kuznetsky District, Penza Oblast =

Kuznetsky District Кузнецкий район (Russian)
- District
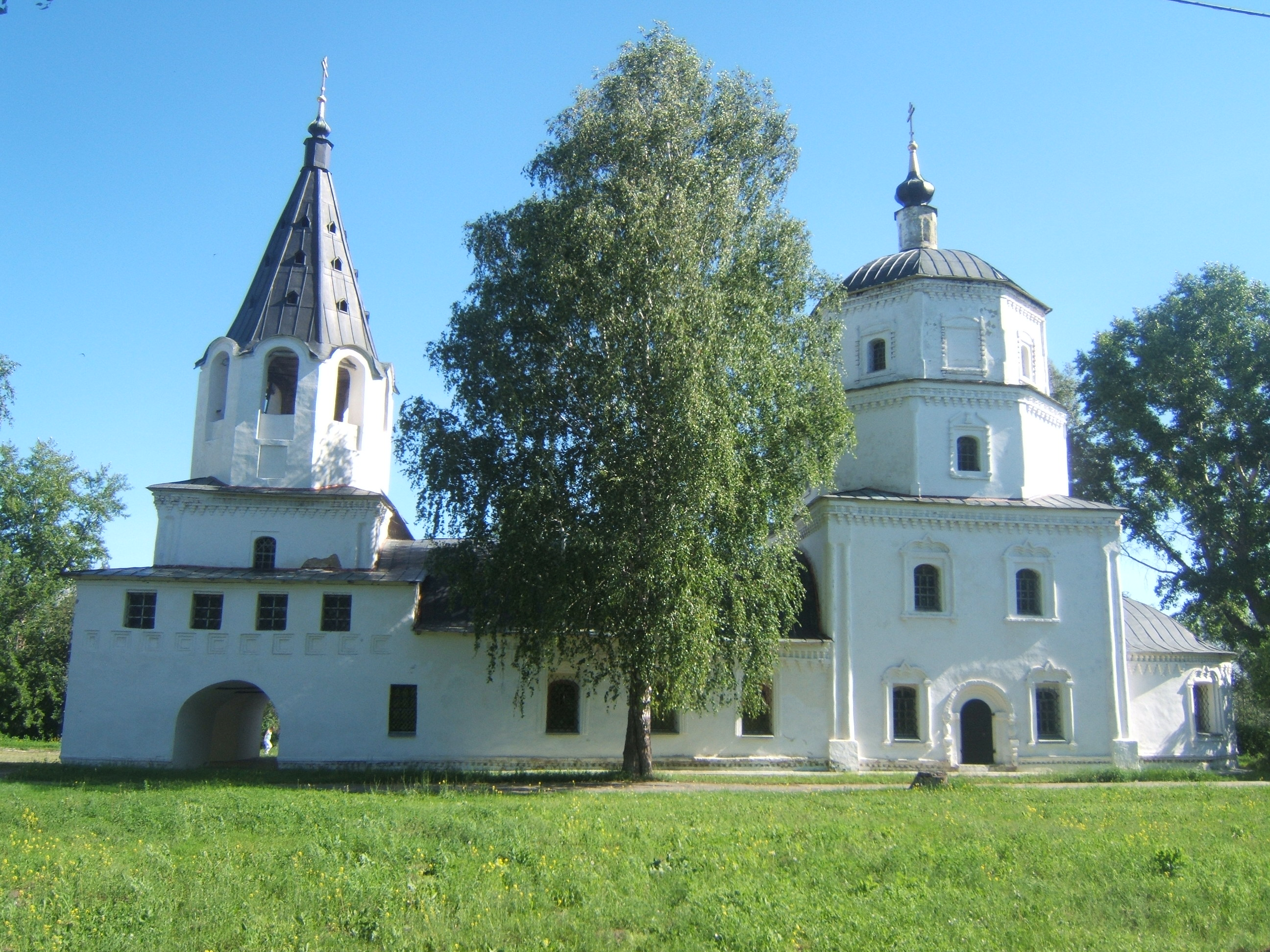
- Museum of Radishchev. Transfiguration Church. 18th century, Kuznetsky District

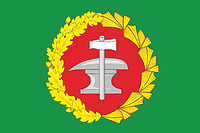
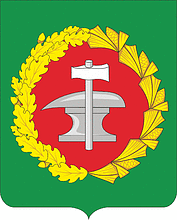
- Flag Coat of arms
- Location of Kuznetsky District in Penza Oblast
- Coordinates: 53°07′N 46°36′E
- Country: Russia
- Federal subject: Penza Oblast
- Established: 16 July 1928
- Administrative center: Kuznetsk

Area
  - Total: 2,071 km^{2} (800 sq mi)

Population (2010 Census)
  - Total: 38,056
  - Density: 18.38/km^{2} (47.59/sq mi)
  - Urban: 17.9%
  - Rural: 82.1%

Administrative structure
  - Administrative divisions: 2 Work settlements, 11 Selsoviets
  - Inhabited localities: 2 urban-type settlements, 52 rural localities

Municipal structure
  - Municipally incorporated as: Kuznetsky Municipal District
  - Municipal divisions: 2 urban settlements, 11 rural settlements
- Time zone: UTC+3 (MSK)
- OKTMO ID: 56640000
- Website: http://rkuzn.pnzreg.ru/

Kuznetsky District (Russian: Кузне́цкий райо́н) is an administrative and municipal district (raion), one of the twenty-seven in Penza Oblast, Russia. It is located in the east of the oblast. The area of the district is 2,071 square kilometers (800 sq mi). Its administrative center is the town of Kuznetsk (which is not administratively a part of the district). Population: 38,056 (2010 Census); 41,712 (2002 census); 41,597 (1989 Soviet census).

== Administrative and municipal status ==
Within the framework of administrative divisions, Kuznetsky District is one of the twenty-seven in the oblast. The town of Kuznetsk serves as its administrative center, despite being incorporated separately as a town of oblast significance—an administrative unit with the status equal to that of the districts.

As a municipal division, the district is incorporated as "Kuznetsky Municipal District". The town of oblast significance of Kuznetsk is incorporated separately from the district as Kuznetsk Urban Okrug.

== Notable residents ==
- Viktor Ilyukhin (1949–2011), State Duma deputy, born in Sosnovka
- Yevgeny Rodionov (1977–1996), Russian soldier captured and executed by Chechen rebels in the First Chechen War, born in Chibirley
- Vladimir Zakhmatov (born 1954), scientist
