= May 1977 =

Month of 1977

<<	May 1977					>>
Su	Mo	Tu	We	Th	Fr	Sa
1	2	3	4	5	6	7
8	9	10	11	12	13	14
15	16	17	18	19	20	21
22	23	24	25	26	27	28
29	30	31

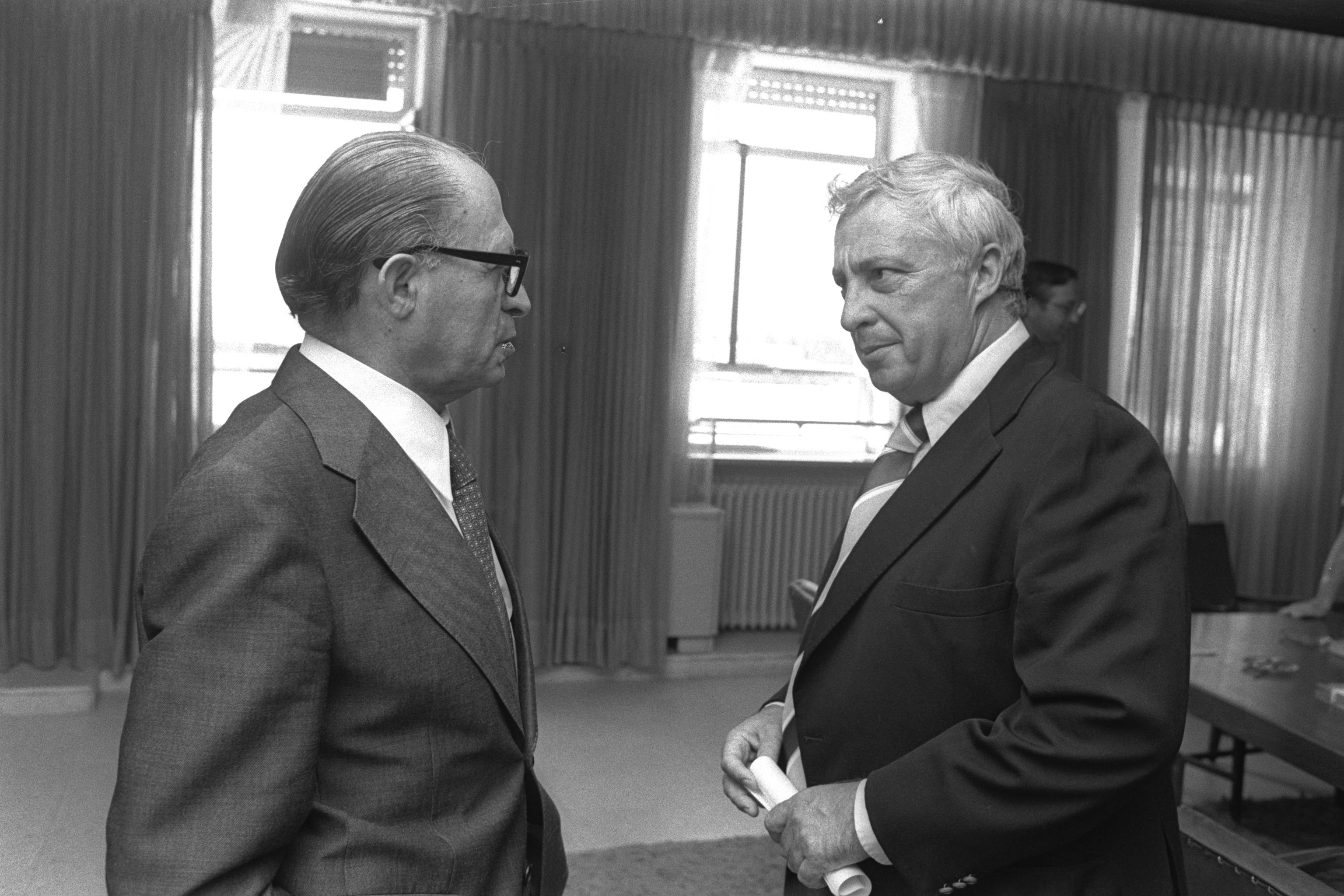
May 17, 1977: Menachem Begin (left) becomes new Prime Minister of Israel as Likud Party takes control of the Knesset, replaces Prime Minister Ariel Sharon (right)

The following events occurred in May 1977:

== May 1, 1977 (Sunday) ==
- In Istanbul, 34 people were killed and hundreds injured in the Taksim Square massacre as gunfighting began among some of the 150,000 marchers, followed by a riot that lasted two hours and injured 200 additional people.
- In one of the largest mass arrests in U.S. history, from the largest protest up to that time against the use of nuclear power in the United States for civilian energy needs, 1,414 anti-nuclear activists from the Clamshell Alliance were arrested at the Seabrook Station Nuclear Power Plant near Portsmouth, New Hampshire. The prisoners were held in jails and in New Hampshire National Guard armories for up to 12 days, until the remaining 550 demonstrators were released without posting bail because of the cost of their imprisonment.
- The Janata Party was organized in India by four non-Communist political parties that had joined in opposition to Prime Minister Indira Gandhi in the April elections.
- Died: Albert Plécy, 62, French photojournalist, committed suicide by shooting himself in the head.

== May 2, 1977 (Monday) ==
- After Argentina and Chile submitted their dispute over ownership of the Beagle Islands for binding arbitration by five World Court judges agreed upon by both nations, the court awarded all three islands (Picton, Lennox and Nueva) to Chile. The agreement notwithstanding, Argentina rejected the order and the two nations prepared to go to war in 1978.
- Voting was held in Indonesia for the 360 elected seats of the 460-member Dewan Perwakilan Rakyat. The Golkar political party (Partai Golongan Karya or "Party of Labor Unions") won 232 seats, enough for the necessary 231 seats for a majority, and the Partai Persatuan Pembangunan (PPP) won 99.
- At least 46 people in a poor section of the Indian city of Mumbai died of accidental poisoning, while more than 100 were hospitalized, after drinking homemade liquor.
- Died:
  - Sid Collins, 54, American radio broadcaster known for reporting the annual Indianapolis 500, committed suicide after being diagnosed with amyotrophic lateral sclerosis (ALS), less than four weeks before he had been scheduled to broadcast the 1977 race.
  - Edward N. Cole, 67, President of General Motors Corporation from 1967 to 1974, was killed in the crash of an airplane that he was piloting.

== May 3, 1977 (Tuesday) ==
- The Unión de Centro Democrático (UDC) coalition of political parties was established in Spain by Prime Minister Adolfo Suárez in advance of the June 15 parliamentary elections.
- Born: Eric Church, American country music singer; in Granite Falls, North Carolina

== May 4, 1977 (Wednesday) ==
- U.S. Congressman Richard A. Tonry, a Democrat of Louisiana, resigned only four months after taking office, after having been indicted for receiving illegal campaign funds Tonry declared that he would run as a candidate in a special election to regain his seat, but lost in the Democratic primary on June 25. Tonry would later plead guilty and receive a six-month federal prison sentence becoming known for being the U.S. Representative "who served more time in prison than he did in Congress."
- The first of five installments of the Nixon interviews, with British journalist David Frost asking questions of former U.S. President Richard Nixon, was shown on syndicated television, with 45,000,000 viewers hearing Nixon's answers to questions about the Watergate scandal that had led to Nixon's 1974 resignation. Nixon was paid $600,000 by Frost's production company for the interviews, plus a percentage of profits. The first installment of interviews, shown on independent TV stations, set a record for most viewers of a political interview, with a 50% share of Los Angeles viewers and 47% in New York.
- Former President of Argentina Alejandro A. Lanusse, who had guided the transition from military rule to democracy, was arrested along with the two other members of his three-man junta. A court in Buenos Aires detained Lanusse for questioning about a 1971 contract that his junta had granted to a private firm for the manufacture of aluminum. Detained also were Admiral Pedro Gnavi and Air Force General Carlos Rey, who formed the junta with Army General Lanusse, and former Defense Minister Jose R. Caceres.
- Nikolai V. Podgorny, the Soviet Union's ceremonial head of state as President of the Presidium of the Supreme Soviet, made his last appearance as a Soviet official, appearing at a state dinner for Ethiopia's President Mengistu Haile Mariam, where he declared that the Soviets would provide military and financial support for their new African ally. Podgorny would be removed from the Communist Party Politburo on May 24 and dismissed from his government post on June 16.

== May 5, 1977 (Thursday) ==
- A U.S. Army veteran of Hispanic descent was killed after being arrested by five officers of the Houston Police Department in Texas, and two HPD members were charged with murder. Terry W. Denson and Stephen Orlando beat Campos severely after arresting him on charges of disorderly conduct outside an East Houston bar, and after taking him to the precinct station for booking, were told to take Campos to a hospital for treatment. Instead, the two officers drove Campo out to a bayou, where he died of drowning. Another of the officers who witnessed the killing informed the chief of police. On October 7, an all-white jury would later convict Denson and Orlando of negligent homicide, and the two men would be placed on one-year's probation and fined one dollar apiece. On October 20, the four policemen were indicted by a federal grand jury for criminal violations of the Civil Rights Act of 1964. Three of the four (Denson, Orlando and Joseph Janish) would be convicted on February 8, 1978, for conspiracy to violate Torres's civil rights, resulting in his death.
- Born: Virginie Efira, Belgian-born French TV actress; in Schaerbeek
- Died: Ludwig Erhard, 80, Chancellor of West Germany, 1963 to 1966

== May 6, 1977 (Friday) ==
- Elections were held for 85 seats of the 100-seat Parliament of the West African nation of Sierra Leone. The All People's Congress (APC) of President Siaka Stevens and Prime Minister Christian Alusine Kamara-Taylor won 70 seats, and the Sierra Leone People's Party (SLPP) won 15. A year later, the APC would become Sierra Leone's only legal political party, although multi-candidate elections would continue to take place. Opposing political parties would not be in an election again until 1996.
- Died: Grey Walter, 67, U.S.-born British neurophysiologist and computer scientist known for creating the first autonomous robots

== May 7, 1977 (Saturday) ==
- Argentina's Foreign Minister, Vice Admiral Cesar Guzzetti, was shot and critically wounded in an assassination attempt while he was at a Buenos Aires doctor's office for a checkup. The Montoneros guerrilla group took responsibility. Guzetti would survive, but was left quadraplegic and mute. He was replaced on May 27 by Vice Admiral Óscar Antonio Montes.
- U.S. thoroughbred racehorse Seattle Slew won the Kentucky Derby.
- Spain's government legalized the National Confederation of Labor, which had been banned since 1939.
- Celtic F.C. defeated Rangers F.C., 1 to 0, to win the Scottish Cup in soccer football, playing in the rain before 54,252 spectators at Hampden Park in Glasgow. Celtic and Rangers, both of Glagow, had finished first and second, respectively, in the Scottish Premier Division.
- The University of Southern California won the NCAA men's volleyball championship at Los Angeles, defeating Ohio State University in the best 3-of-5 match, 15–7, 9–15, 15–10, 15–12.
- Died: Prince Xavier of Bourbon-Parma, 87, Carlist pretender to the throne of Spain as the grandson of King Carlos IV, who was deposed in 1808. Xavier de Borbon-Parma, whose followers called him King Carlos IX, died in exile in Switzerland. His claim to the throne was assumed by his son, Carlos Hugo, Duke of Parma. The next day, armed police blocked thousands of Carlist pilgrims, opposed to King Juan Carlos I, from traveling to a rally in the Basque region, and Carlos Hugo's wife, Princess Irene of the Netherlands was ordered to leave Spain immediately.

== May 8, 1977 (Sunday) ==
- Voting was held in the French Territory of the Afars and the Issas on the question of whether the northeast African territory, the last European colony on the continent, should become an independent nation or remain a territory of the French Republic. The vote in favor of independence was 80,864 in favor and only 199 against. The territory would become the Republic of Djibouti 50 days later on June 27, 1977.
- In commemoration of the 100th anniversary of the founding of Romania, President Nicolae Ceausescu issued a decree of amnesty to more than 28,500 people who were incarcerated (including 9,500 jailed while awaiting trial). Among those freed was dissident Paul Goma. He and his family would be allowed to leave the country on November 20.
- The Grateful Dead recorded their live concert album Cornell 5/8/77 during the rock group's performance at Barton Hall at Cornell University in Ithaca, New York. The recording itself would not be released until 40 years later, in 2017.

== May 9, 1977 (Monday) ==
- A hotel fire killed 33 people and injured 57 others in Amsterdam when the five story Hotel Polen broke out in an elevator shaft. Within 22 minutes, fire had engulfed the wooden building. All but one of the 33 dead were tourists, most of whom were from Sweden.
- Jose Maria Bulto, the president and chairman of the board of the Spanish chemical company SA Cros, was assaulted by two militants of the Catalan terrorist group EPOCA (Exèrcit Popular Català or Catalan People's Army), who strapped a bomb to his chest and threatened to detonate it by remote control if he didn't pay them a ransom of 500 million Spanish pesetas within 24 hours. The EPOCA terrorists allowed him to leave so that he could raise the ransom money, Bulto, afraid to go to a police station, went to his home in the Pedralbes of Barcelona and died while trying to disarm the bomb by himself.
- Born:
  - Marek Jankulovski, Czech footballer and defender with 77 caps for the Czech Republic national team; in Ostrava, Czechoslovakia
  - James Riley, American fantasy novelist known for the Story Thieves series, the Revenge of Magic series and the Half Upon a Time trilogy
- Died:
  - James Jones, 55, American novelist known for his 1951 bestseller From Here to Eternity, died of congestive heart failure.
  - Walter Kraft, 71 German organ music composer, died in the fire at the Hotel Posen, where he had been staying as a guest.
  - Harry G. Johnson, 53, Canadian economist, died of a stroke.

== May 10, 1977 (Tuesday) ==
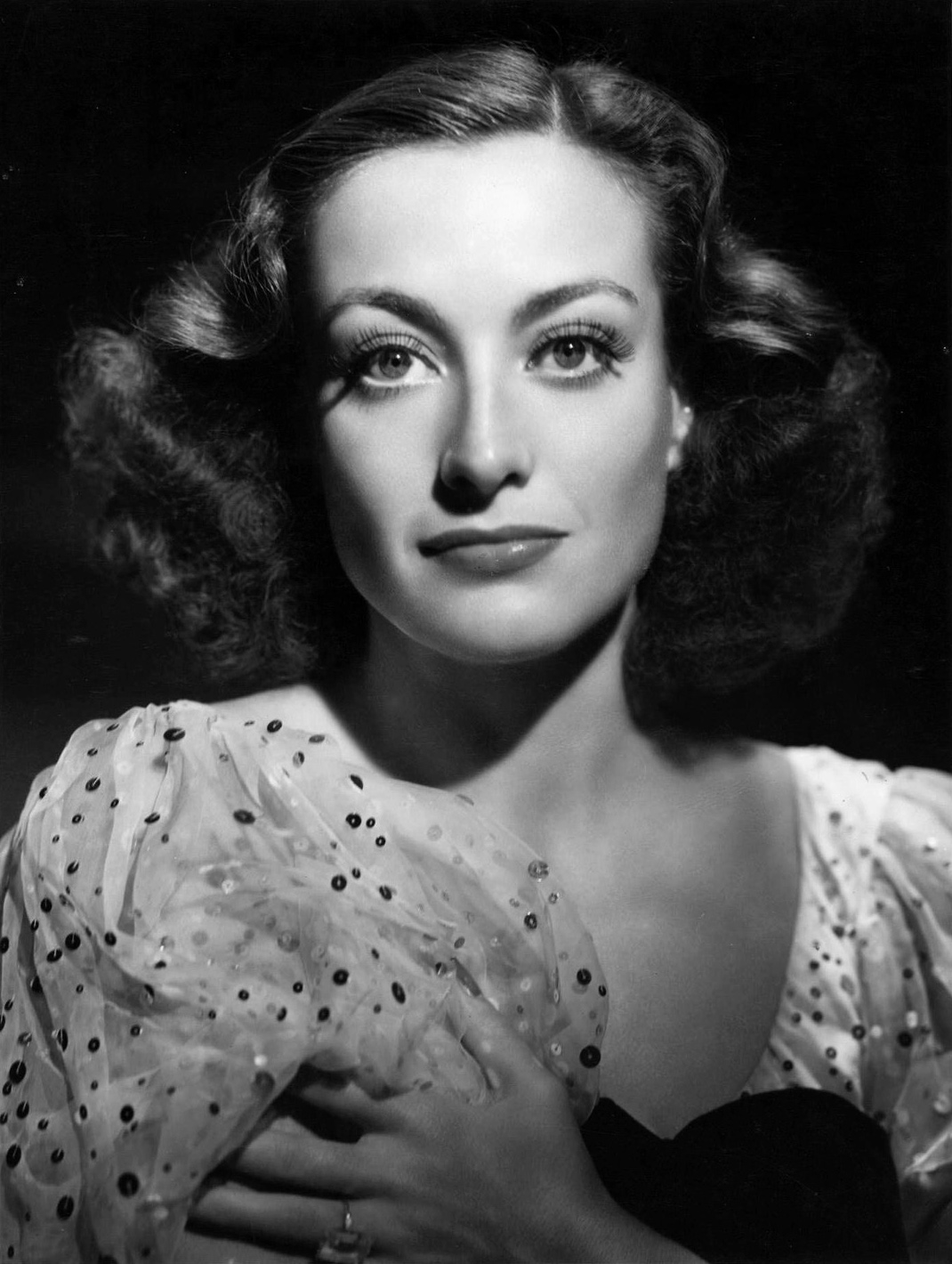
Joan Crawford

- All 54 paratroopers and crew were killed in the crash of an Israel Defense Forces (IDF) helicopter, when the aircraft fell from the sky and exploded during a training exercise near the Jewish settlement of Naaran on the West Bank. The IDF Chief of Staff, Lieutenant General Mordechai Gur, said that the Sikorsky CH-53 helicopter had not been attacked and that the cause of the crash had not been determined. At a court-martial, the helicopter squadron leader (not identified publicly) in charge of the military exercise would later be charged with "flying his own helicopter below the altitude specified in standing orders and was reprimanded.
- Ramses II returned to Egypt on an airplane flight from Paris, landing in Cairo after his 3,212-year-old mummy was "cured by radiation of 60 types of fungi and two strains of insects." Ramses had ruled Egypt from 1279 BC to 1235 BC, and his mummy had been in France for eight months.
- All 20 crew on an Iranian fishing boat were killed when the vessel capsized in the Persian Gulf. Reportedly, the victims who didn't drown were eaten by sharks.
- Mauricio Borgonovo Pohl, the Foreign Minister of El Salvador, was found dead three weeks after he had been kidnapped. Salvadoran President Arturo Armando Molina had refused to negotiate with Borgonovo's kidnappers, who had demanded the release of 37 political prisoners. The Farabundo Marti Popular Liberation Front said in a statement that they had "executed" Borgonovo as part of their revolutionary war to establish socialism. His body was discovered along a road with three .22-caliber bullet holes in his head.
- Oklahoma became the first U.S. state to provide for execution of condemned criminals by lethal injection, as Governor David Boren signed legislation into law. The intravenous administering of poison to put a prisoner to death replaced the electric chair as the method for carrying out the death penalty. The U.S. state of Texas followed suit the next day, as Governor Dolph Briscoe signed a similar bill into law.
- The new Israeli village of Elkana was founded on the occupied West Bank as the fourth community to be established on the formerly Palestinian land. Israel had confiscated 1.626 square kilometers (0.63 square miles) of land from the Palestinian village of Mas-ha to build settlements.
- Died:
  - Joan Crawford (stage name for Lucille LeSueur), 73, American film actress and Academy Award winner for Mildred Pierce
  - Dr. Rulon C. Allred, 71, American naturopath, Mormon fundamentalist, polygamist and leader, since 1954, of the Apostolic United Brethren breakaway sect, was shot to death at his office in the Salt Lake City suburb of Murray, Utah, by two women. Five people, identified as followers of rival polygamist sect leader Ervil LeBaron, would be arrested on September 23 on charges of plotting the assassination of Allred and other polygamist leaders in the U.S. and Mexico.

== May 11, 1977 (Wednesday) ==
- At least 23 underground coal miners were killed in Japan near the town of Ashibetsu on the island of Hokkaido, after blasting operations ignited methane 2,600 feet (790 m) underground.
- Television magnate Ted Turner, owner of the Atlanta Braves baseball team, appointed himself as the team's manager for a single game as the Braves lost, 2 to 1, to the Pittsburgh Pirates. Turner had suspended regular manager Dave Bristol, sending him on a 10-day scouting trip. After his sole game coaching the Braves, Turner was told by National League President Chub Feeney to never manage again, citing a Major League Baseball rule that prohibiting managers or players from owning stock in a major league team. After letting third-base coach Vern Benson to manage the team for one game the next day (which Benson won), Turner returned Bristol to manage for the remainder of the season.
- Born:
  - Victor Matfield, South African professional rugby union player with 127 appearances for the Springboks; in Pietersburg
  - Janne Ahonen, Finnish ski jumper with 2 individual world championships (1997 and 2005); in Lahti

== May 12, 1977 (Thursday) ==
- The U.S. Department of Defense launched two DISCUS satellites, then placed them into geosynchronous orbit over the Atlantic Ocean and Pacific Ocean at an altitude of 22,300 miles (35,900 km). The orbiting objects were the first ever from the U.S. to carry "alarm and maneuvering systems to enable them to take evasive action" if threatened by enemy satellites. The second of the satellites was noted by NORAD to be the 10,000th man-made object that had been sent into space, nearly 20 years after the Soviet Union's Sputnik satellite had become the first one, on October 4, 1957.
- Born:
  - Maryam Mirzakhani, Iranian mathematician and 2014 Fields Medal winner for her contributions to the theory of moduli space of Riemann surfaces; in Tehran (died of breast cancer, 2017).
  - Graeme Dott. Scottish professional snooker player and 2006 world champion; in Larkhall, South Lanarkshire
  - Annechien Steenhuizen, Dutch journalist and co-host of the national news show NOS Journaal; in Amersfoort
- Died:
  - General Otto Dessloch, 87, Nazi German Luftwaffe officer
  - Lau Lauritzen Jr., 66, Danish film director and screenwriter

== May 13, 1977 (Friday) ==
- Pakistan's Prime Minister Zulfiqar Ali Bhutto announced a nationwide referendum on the question of whether he should continue in office with dictatorial powers, or resign.
- Dolores Ibarruri, described as "the most historic figure still alive from the Spanish Civil War" as well as "the most admired and hated orator" of that conflict, returned to Spain from the Soviet Union after 38 years of exile. The 81-year old Ibarruri, nicknamed "La Pasionaria", was the president of the Communist Party of Spain (PCE), which had been legalized in April after having been banned since 1939, had filed as the Communist candidate for the scheduled June 15 elections for the Congress of Deputies.
- The Economic Stimulus Appropriations Act of 1977 was signed into law by U.S. President Jimmy Carter after passing the U.S. House of Representatives, 281 to 126, and the U.S. Senate, 63 to 15.
- Born:
  - Samantha Morton, English film and TV actress; in Nottingham
  - Ilse DeLange, Dutch pop music and country music singer; in Almelo
  - Pusha T, Rapper; in New York City
- Died:
  - Michael J. Spillane, 43, U.S. mobster who controlled the Irish-American "Hell's Kitchen" neighborhood of New York City, was shot and killed outside of his apartment building in Queens.
  - Zhang Naiqi, 80, former Minister of Food for the People's Republic of China who was removed from office in disgrace in 1957 after being accused by the Communist government as being right-wing.

== May 14, 1977 (Saturday) ==
- The Montreal Canadiens swept the Boston Bruins in four games to win their second straight Stanley Cup and the championship of the National Hockey League. In Game 4, played in Boston, the score was tied, 1 to 1 at the end of 60 minutes of regulation and went into sudden death overtime. At 4:32 into the extra time, Jacques Lemaire of Montreal (who had tied the game in the second period) scored the winning goal past goalkeeper Gerry Cheevers.
- Liverpool F.C. won England's soccer football championship, finishing first place on the last day of the 1976-77 season of The Football League's First Division, playing to a 0 to 0 draw at West Ham United, enough to finish one point ahead of Manchester City F.C. despite Manchester City's 1–0 win over Coventry City. Going into the final day, Liverpool's record was 23 wins, 10 draws (56 points) and Manchester City was 20 wins, 14 draws (54 points). While Manchester City's win brought it to 56, Liverpool needed only a draw for 57 points.
- Ahmed Sekou Toure, the President of Guinea, announced that he and the ruling National Revolutionary Council were abolishing the income tax for Guinean citizens.
- In a ceremony at the Zarzuela Palace in Madrid, former Crown Prince of Spain Don Juan de Borbon, who had been passed over by Francisco Franco in favor of the Count's son, Juan Carlos I, renounced the claims he had held since 1941 as pretender to the throne (as King Juan III of Spain). The former pretender then instructed his supporters to give their full support to King Juan Carlos.
- Born: Roy Halladay, American major league baseball pitcher, 2019 Baseball Hall of Fame inductee; in Denver (killed in plane crash, 2017)
- Died: Sally Victor, 72, American milliner known for designing hats and headwear for celebrities.

== May 15, 1977 (Sunday) ==
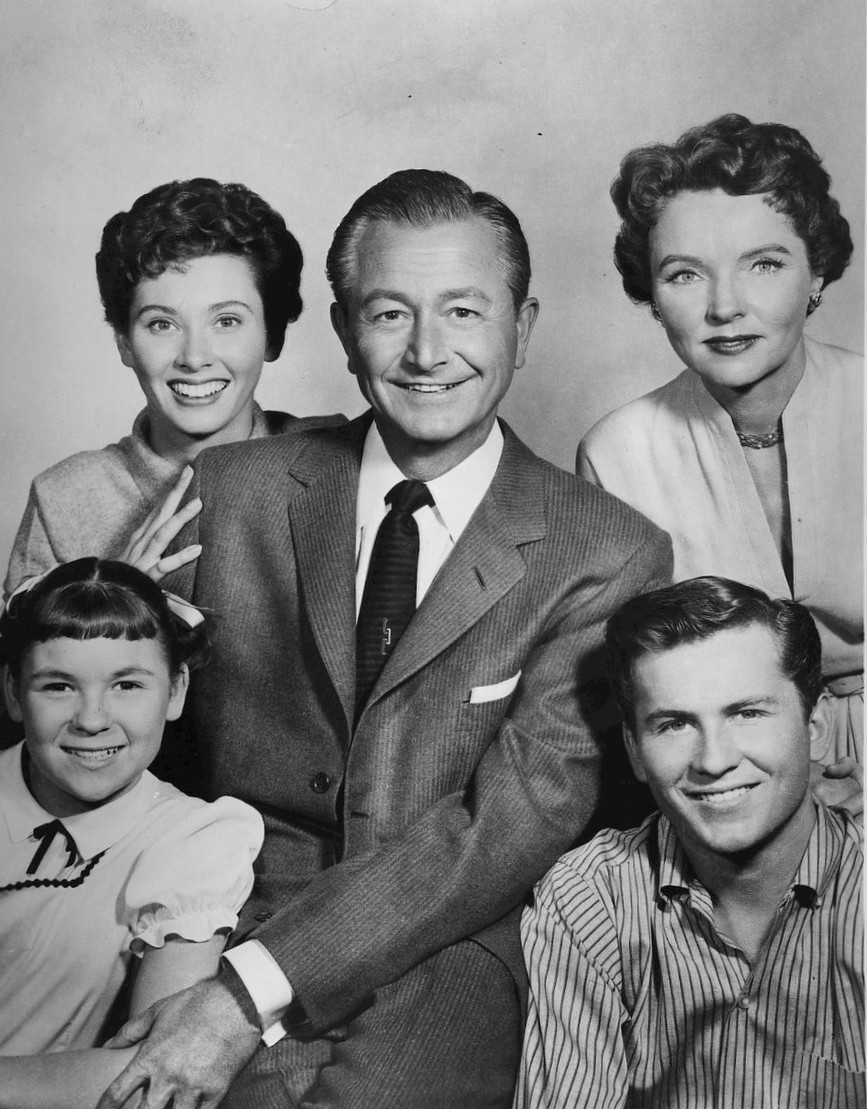
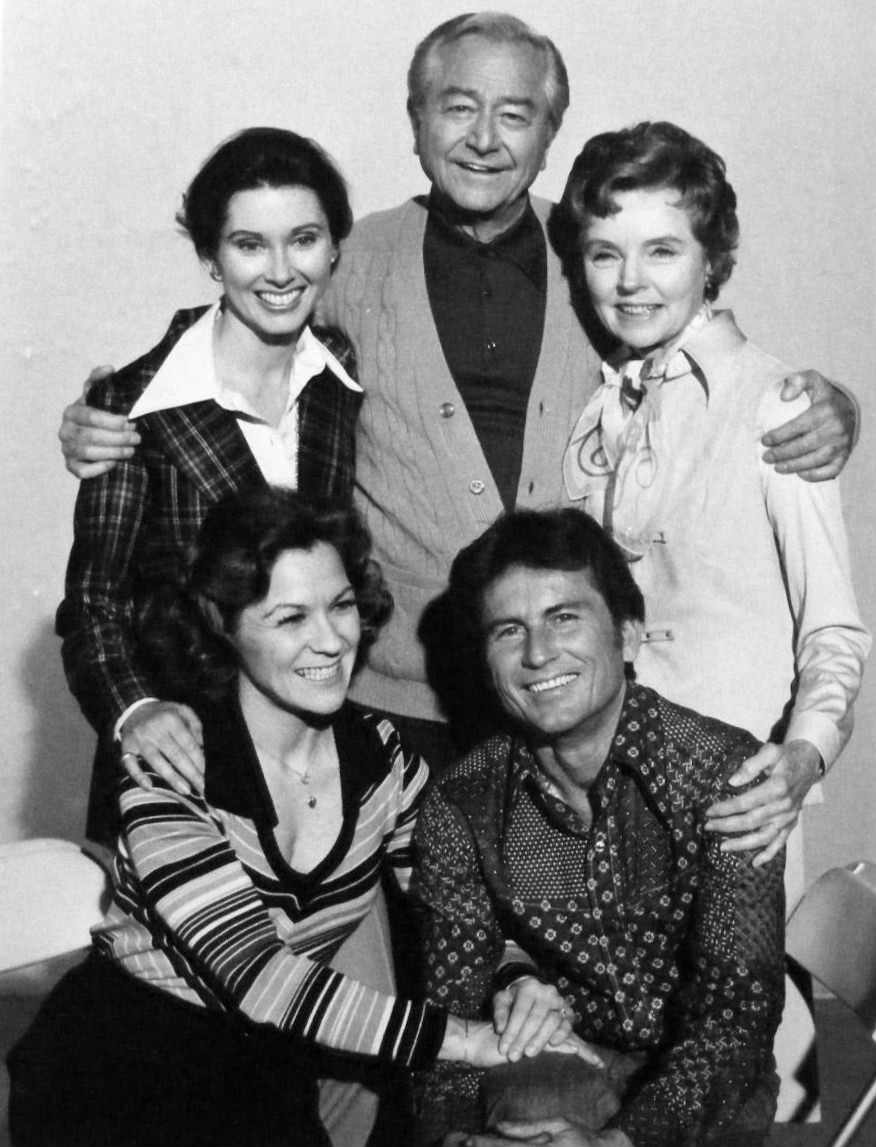
The cast in 1962 and in 1977
- The cast of the popular 1950s American situation comedy Father Knows Best returned to television for the first time since its 203rd and last original episode on May 23, 1960. The Father Knows Best Reunion, lasting 90 minutes, was aired at 9:00 Eastern time on the NBC television network and brought back all five actors of the fictional Anderson family, with the parents Robert Young and Jane Wyatt (Jim and Margaret Anderson) and the three children, Elinor Donahue (Becky), Billy Gray (Bud) and Lauren Chapin (Kathy).
- Died:
  - Herbert Wilcox, 87, British film producer and director known for Odette
  - Robert Maynard Hutchins, 78, American university administrator and founder of the Center for the Study of Democratic Institutions

== May 16, 1977 (Monday) ==
- Five people were killed, and eight injured, by helicopter blades in New York City when a 21-passenger Sikorsky commuter helicopter operating as New York Airways Flight 972 toppled sideways while attempting a takeoff from the roof of the Pan Am Building. The casualties were part of a group of 21 passengers boarding a helicopter to fly them from the city to the John F. Kennedy International Airport. At 5:35 in the afternoon, the helicopter's landing gear strut collapsed while the rotors were turning in preparation for takeoff. Four passengers on the roof were killed by the turning rotors, including movie director Michael Findlay. Another rotor fell from the 59-story Pan Am building onto a sidewalk at Madison Avenue near 43rd Street, where Anne Barnecott was walking on a sidewalk and was struck in her back by a falling blade.
- In southern Africa, Zambia's President Kenneth Kaunda called a press conference that "I wish to tell all Zambians today that we are in a state of war with Rhodesia," and added, "We will fight and I have already directed my boys to shoot any Rhodesian planes on sight using Zambian airspace."
- Born:
  - Melanie Lynskey, New Zealand TV actress; in New Plymouth
  - Emilíana Torrini, Icelandic singer and songwriter; in Kópavogur
- Died: Modibo Keita, 61, the first President of Mali, from the West African nation's independence in 1960 until his overthrow in 1968, died in prison after more than eight years of incarceration by his successors, President Moussa Traore.

== May 17, 1977 (Tuesday) ==
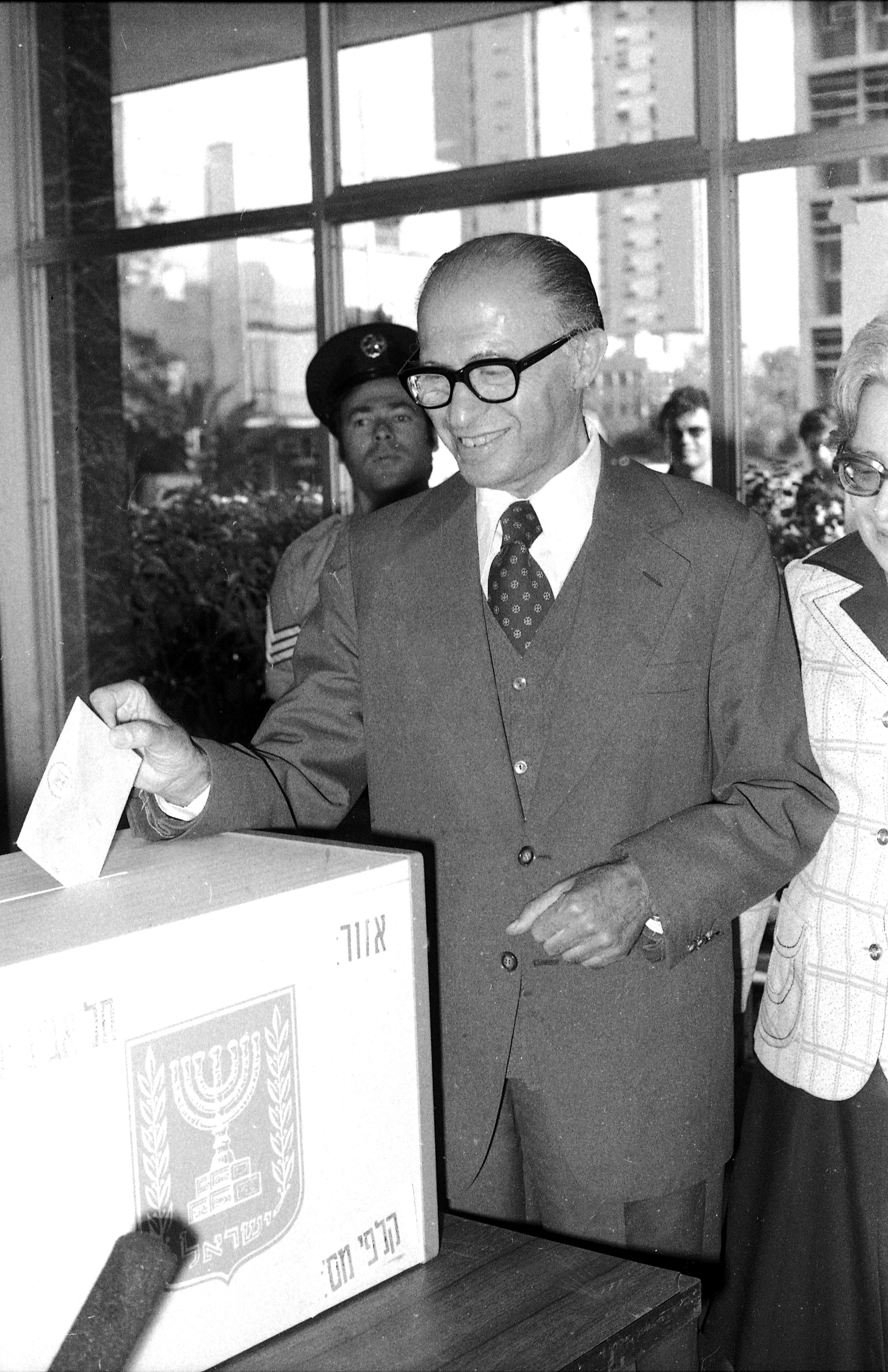
Begin voting for Likud Party candidates

- Voting was held for all 120 seats of Israel's parliament, the Knesset, and the right-wing Likud Party of Menachem Begin won control with a plurality (43 seats) while the ruling left-wing Alignment of Prime Minister Shimon Peres lost 19 seats and was left with only 32. Likud formed a coalition with the religious Zionist party, the Mafdal.
- The first American tourists since 1961, to visit the Communist-governed island nation of Cuba, arrived at Havana on the cruise ship Daphne. U.S. President Jimmy Carter had lifted the ban on travel to Cuba in March.
- The West German company OTRAG (Orbital Transport-und Raketen-Aktiengesellschaft), founded by German engineer Lutz Kayser, made the first successful test of its own rocket, with the goal of creating the first corporate space program. The launch took place from the central African nation of Zaire on property leased by OTRAG near the Luvua River and the Kapani tone plateau. Kayser described his specific goal as creating a lower-cost means for other nations to launch communications satellites, rather than military use. The rocket reached an altitude of 7 miles (11 km) before descending to a spot 2.5 miles (4.0 km) from the launching pad.
- The first Chuck E. Cheese restaurant was opened, with the designation "Pizza Time Theatre", as a venture by Nolan Bushnell, on South Winchester Boulevard in San Jose, California.
- Died:
  - Claude Roger-Marx, 88, French playwright and writer
  - J. C. Anand, 54, Pakistani film producer and distributor
  - John Nardi (alias for Giovanni Narcchione), 61, American gangster and racketeer, was killed by a car bomb as he was approaching his own vehicle in Cleveland.

== May 18, 1977 (Wednesday) ==
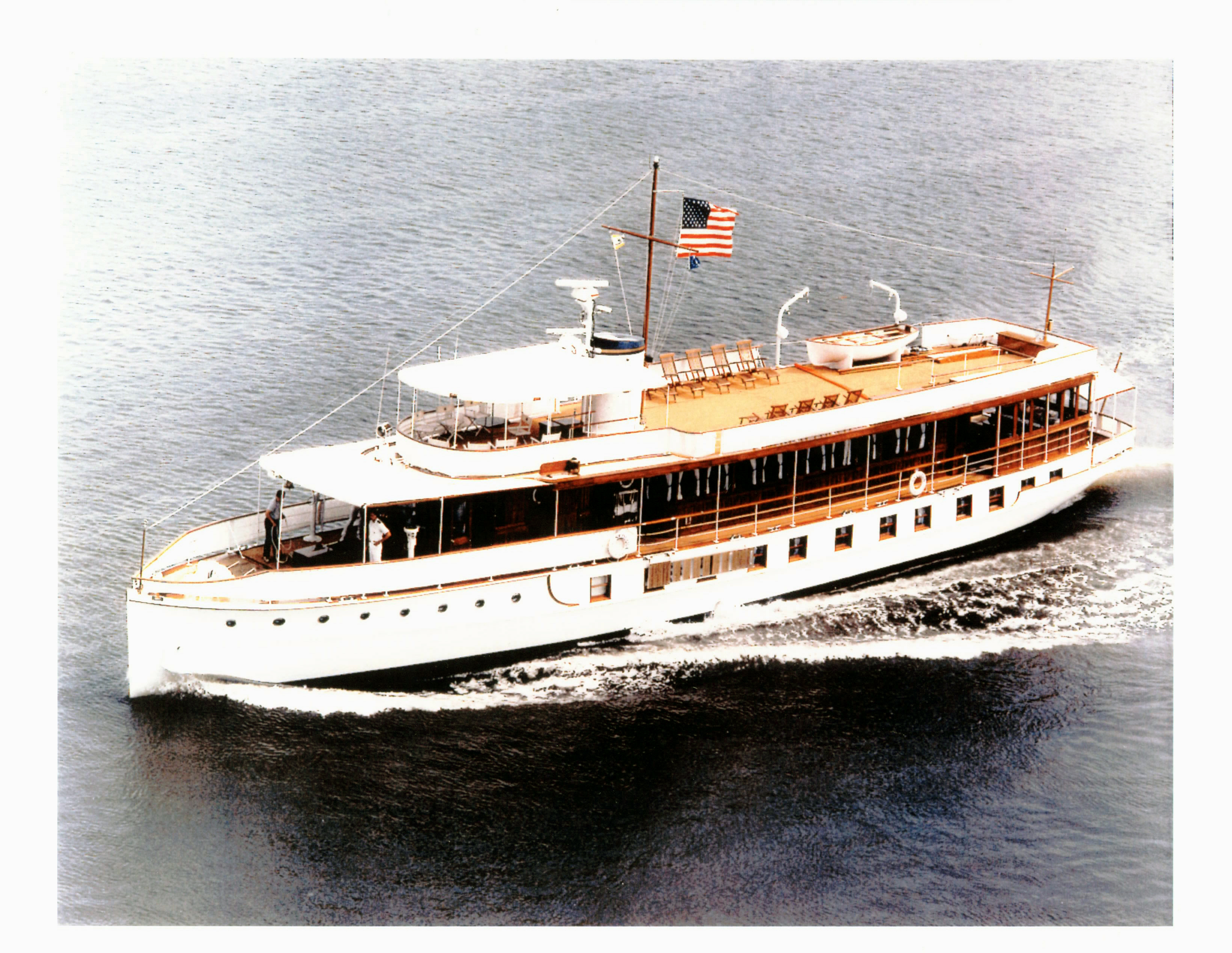
USS Sequoia on the Potomac River in 2003

- The U.S. presidential yacht USS Sequoia, last used on June 9, 1976, was sold at an auction by the U.S. government in a symbolic gesture by the administration of President Jimmy Carter to reduce federal government expenses. Bidding took place at the La Coquille Club in Manalapan, Florida and the yacht was sold to businessman Thomas Malloy for $286,000. The yacht would be bought in 1980 by the non-profit Presidential Yacht Trust, to be loaned to the White House on request.
- The Environmental Modification Convention (ENMOD) (officially the Convention on the Prohibition of Military or Any Other Hostile Use of Environmental Modification Techniques) an international treaty to ban weather modification in warfare, was signed by representatives of 22 nations, including the U.S., the UK, the Soviet Union, Canada, East Germany and West Germany, and Italy. After ratification by 20 nations, it would become effective on October 5, 1978.
- White voters in South-West Africa (now Namibia), a United Nations Trusteeship under the administration of South Africa, overwhelmingly approved a transition to black majority rule and independence in a referendum on the "Turnhalle Plan". The voting result (30,329 in favor of, 1,700 against the plan) was not binding on South Africa, which had no plans to grant independence to the area.
- The National State Assembly in the Asian island nation of Sri Lanka was dissolved by President William Gopallawa at the request of Prime Minister J. R. Jayewardene, and an election was scheduled for July 21.
- The government of Sudan expelled all 90 of its Soviet military advisers from the northeast African nation, along with 57 members of their families.
- Police in Alexandria, Virginia arrested rapist Montie Ralph Rissell, an 18-year-old serial rapist who had murdered five women over the previous nine months. Rissell, whose last homicide had been on May 5, would confess to the five murders and be given five consecutive life sentences. As of 2023, he remained in prison after having been denied parole annually since 1995.
- Died:
  - Haki Karer, 26, Turkish and Kurdish separatist leader, was assassinated in a coffeehouse in Gaziantep.
  - Tony Aveyard, 21, English footballer for Scarborough F.C., died two days after suffering a fatal head injury during a 2–1 win over the visiting Boston United F.C. team, a week after winning the FA Trophy.

== May 19, 1977 (Thursday) ==
- The government of Kenya banned big-game hunting within the central African nation, revoking the concessions to companies and individuals to shoot and kill endangered species, including elephants, rhinoceroses and leopards. Under the new regulations, which took effect immediately, all licenses for carrying hunting rifles were canceled and no visitor would be allowed to enter Kenya with firearms or hunting weapons. Safaris in wildlife refuges such as the two Tsavo National Parks were limited afterward to photography.
- The kidnapping of Colleen Stan, in which a young woman was held captive by a husband and wife and tortured for more than seven years, began near Red Bluff, California. She would not be freed until August 9, 1984.
- The final wishes of eccentric Beverly Hills millionaire Sandra West to have her burial carried out with her sitting behind the steering wheel of her 1964 Ferrari automobile "with the seat slanted comfortably", with her body dressed in her favorite lace nightgown. West was interred at a cemetery in San Antonio, Texas, with the car and her body loaded into a 20 feet (6.1 m) long crate, which was then lowered into a 9 feet (2.7 m) deep grave, where two truckloads of concrete were then poured.

== May 20, 1977 (Friday) ==
- The leader of Spain's leftist Spanish Socialist Workers' Party (PSOE), Felipe González, gave the first leftist endorsement of Spain's monarchy, following a cordial meeting with King Juan Carlos. Gonzalez would later serve as Prime Minister of Spain from 1982 to 1996.
- Javier Ybarra Bergé, a Basque businessman and writer, and former mayor of Bilbao, was kidnapped from his home by Basque separatists who had formerly been members of the larger separatist organization, the ETA. After the failure to meet the group's demand for one billion Spanish pesetas ($14 million in U.S. dollars at the time), the kidnappers would murder Ybarra on June 20.
- Died: General Lewis B. Hershey, 83, Director of the U.S. Selective Service Commission from 1941 to 1970 during World War Two, the Korean War and the Vietnam War. During his time in office, General Hershey supervised the drafting of 14,500,000 American men into the U.S. military.

== May 21, 1977 (Saturday) ==
- Voters in Australia were asked to decide on which song should be the nation's anthem (to replace "God Save the Queen"), as well as being presented with four questions on amending the Australian Constitution. Among the results, voters approved requiring Australian federal judges to retire after reaching the age of 70, favored by 80% of voters. A referendum to approve holding Senate and House of Representatives elections on the same day, needing a majority in at least four of Australia's six states, was overwhelmingly approved in New South Wales, Victoria and South Australia, but disapproved in Tasmania, Queensland and Western Australia (where it lost by 14,354 votes out of 602,000). "Advance Australia Fair" was the overall winner with a majority in five states and in the Northern Territory, while voters in South Australia favored "The Song of Australia" and those in the Australian Capital Territory opted for "Waltzing Matilda". A modified version of "Advance Australia Fair" (which had briefly been the anthem from April 9, 1974, to January 22, 1976) would become the anthem again on April 19, 1984.
- The International Court of Justice announced its decision in the Beagle Channel arbitration case submitted by the South American nations of Argentina and Chile regarding the Beagle Channel and the Picton, Lennox and Nueva islands. All three islands were awarded to Chile. On January 25, the Argentine government would refuse to recognize the decision and, on 22 December 1978 would initiate Operation Soberanía, a plan to invade the islands and the Chilean mainland, before standing down.
- U.S. President Carter fired U.S. Army Major General John K. Singlaub from the position of Chief of Staff of U.S. forces in South Korea, after summoning him to the White House to explain a May 19 interview in which Singlaub told Washington Post reporter John Saar that a new Korean War would break out if Carter's plan to remove the 33,000 U.S. troops over the next five years was carried out. Singlaub was reassigned to the U.S. Forces Command at Fort McPherson near Atlanta, and not reprimanded, based on his defense that had thought that his discussion with Saar was off the record. Saar would write later that he had offered Singlaub a chance to be identified only as "a high military source" and that Singlaub replied "make it on the record."
- Playwright Václav Havel was released from a prison in Czechoslovakia, four months after he had been incarcerated for dissidence as part of the Charter 77 movement. Havel would serve as the last President of Czechoslovakia after the fall of Communism in 1989 and until the breakup of the nation into the Czech Republic and Slovakia in 1992.
- In West German soccer football, Borussia Mönchengladbach won the championship of the Bundesliga, finishing with 17 wins, 10 draws, 7 losses (44 points), ahead of FC Schalke 04 (17-9-8) and Eintracht Braunschweig (15-13-6) (both for 43 points) and Eintracht Frankfurt (17-8-9 for 42 points). Although Schalke, Braunschweig and Frankfurt all won, Mönchengladbach's 2 to 2 tie with Bayern München was enough to prevent a 3-way tie for first place. Round 34 games of 1976-77 season, Deutscher Fussball-Bund website.
- In English soccer football, Manchester United won the FA Cup, defeating Liverpool, 2 to 1, before a crowd of 99,252 people at London's Wembley Stadium. Manchester United and finished in 6th place during the 1976-77 season, while Liverpool was in first place.
- Natalia Mărășescu of Romania set the women's world record for the fastest mile, completing the distance in 4 minutes, 23.8 seconds. She would be the record holder until 1980 when it was broken by Mary Decker of the U.S.; Mărășescu broke the record set on August 8, 1973, by Paola Pigni of Italy.
- Gemini, which would go on to become the fourth longest-running non-musical play in Broadway history, made its Broadway debut at the Little Theatre for the first of 1,819 performances, ending on September 6, 1981.
- The Vienna Convention on Road Traffic came into force after having been signed on November 8, 1968.

== May 22, 1977 (Sunday) ==
- A fire killed 15 people, mostly British tourists visiting Belgium, at the Duc de Brabant Hotel in Brussels, and injured 40 others, after breaking out in a snack bar on the hotel's first floor.
- The 1976-77 season of Italy's top calcio (soccer football) league, Serie A, ended with Juventus (23 wins 5 draws for 51 points) in first place over second place Torino F.C. (21 wins, 8 draws for 50 points). On May 2, when both teams had 43 points, Juventus had pulled a point ahead when it defeated Napoli, while Torino had played Lazio to a 0–0 tie.
- The 1976–77 season of Spain's top soccer football league, La Liga, ended with Atlético Madrid (19 wins, 8 draws, for 46 points) in first place over second place FC Barcelona (18 wins, 9 draws, for 45 points). Going into the final week, Atlético Madrid (19-8-6) had already clinched first place and FC Barcelona (17-9-7) had been eliminated.

== May 23, 1977 (Monday) ==
- On 23 May 1977, two coordinated hostage-taking operations were carried out in the Netherlands by armed South Moluccan militants seeking international attention for the independence of the Republic of South Maluku (RMS). At approximately 9:00 a.m., nine militants hijacked Intercity train 747, travelling from Assen to Groningen, near the village of De Punt, in the municipality of Vries, Drenthe. The hijackers initially held 54 passengers hostage, while approximately 40 other passengers were allowed to leave. The train driver and conductor managed to escape. At approximately the same time, four other armed militants entered a public primary school in Bovensmilde, Drenthe. They initially took 125 children and five teachers hostage. Shortly after the occupation began, the militants released 20 children of South Moluccan descent, leaving 105 children and five teachers captive. The two hostage situations continued simultaneously. On 27 May, the children were released from the school following reports of illness among the pupils, although the teachers remained captive. Both operations ended on 11 June 1977, when Dutch military forces intervened. Marines supported by armoured vehicles entered the school in Bovensmilde and freed the remaining teachers without loss of life. At De Punt, an armed assault involving Dutch marines and military aircraft ended the train hijacking. Six hijackers and two hostages were killed during the operation.
- Scientists at the biochemistry and biophysics department at the University of California at San Francisco (UCSF) reported the first use of gene splicing to create insulin from bacteria in a laboratory. Using recombinant DNA, a team isolated the gene which makes insulin in rats and then transplanted the gene into bacteria to produce it in large quantities. The department chairman, Dr. William J. Rutter, said at a press conference that he expected that the human gene for insulin could be grown in bacteria in "a year or two or three" and that mass production of insulin could begin as early as 1982.
- U.S. scientists at the Sandia Laboratories in Albuquerque, New Mexico carried out the world's largest solar-power test, using 71 mirrors to concentrate sunlight 1,100 times for 1.8 megawatts of power to burn a hole through a 0.25 inches (6.4 mm) thick steel plate.
- In its latest attempt to become the first nation to intercept and destroy an orbiting object, the Soviet Union launched a "killer satellite", Kosmos 910 with a goal of destroying a specific target, Kosmos 909, which had been put into orbit three days earlier. The goal was to explode Kosmos 910 after bringing it close enough to destroy Kosmos 909, but 910 was never able to get closer than 100 miles (160 km) of 909, which orbited at an altitude of between 615 miles (990 km) and 1,258 miles (2,025 km) above the Earth.
- The Tax Reduction and Simplification Act of 1977 was signed into law by U.S. President Carter after passing the House, 282-131 and the Senate, 73 to 7.
- Born:
  - Richard Ayoade, British comedian and actor, 2014 BAFTA winner for his role in The IT Crowd; in London
  - Ilia Kulik, Russian figure skater and 1998 Olympic gold medalist; in Moscow
  - Yevgeny Rodionov, Russian soldier and martyr of the Russian Orthodox faith who was executed after being taken prisoner in the First Chechen War; in Chibirley, Russian SFSR, Soviet Union (d. 1996)
  - Luca Attanasio, Italian diplomat who was assassinated while servings as Italy's ambassador to the Democratic Republic of the Congo; in Saronno (d. 2021)

== May 24, 1977 (Tuesday) ==
- The Communist Party of the Soviet Union (CPSU) removed the third-highest ranking government member, Nikolai V. Podgorny, the nominal head of state. While Podgorny continued in office as the President of the Presidium of the Supreme Soviet, he was "relieved of his duties" as a member of the CPSU's 15-man Politburo. Podgorny, along with CPSU General Secretary Leonid Brezhnev and Premier Alexei Kosygin, had been part of the three-man group (or troika) that had replaced Nikita Khrushchev in 1964. The announcement was made by the Soviet news agency Tass, which reported that the CPSU's 250-member Central Committee had unanimously approved the removal. Podgorny retained the ceremonial position of head of state. Podgorny had recently attracted worldwide attention by a tour of leftist African nations in March and April that had brought the Marxist nation of Ethiopia into becoming a Soviet ally, and had last been seen in public on May 4. While no reason was given for Podgorny's fall from grace, he had reportedly attracted the ire of Arab nations because of his condemnation of the states as "reactionary".
- In Belgium, the Egmont Pact was signed by representatives of Belgium's two linguistic communities, the speakers of Flemish and of French, to establish three self-governing regions for Flanders (Flemish), Wallonia (French) and for the Brussels capital territory. The coalition that had reached the agreement would fall apart 17 months later as the Flemish CVP party withdrew its support.
- Argentine security forces raided a meeting of suspected anti-government leftists at a house near Buenos Aires, and killed 12 men and four women in a 10-minute gunfight.
- In Beijing, on Tiananmen Square, the Chairman Mao Memorial Hall was completed. The building serves as the mausoleum for Mao Zedong, who had been Chairman of the Chinese Communist Party and de facto leader of the People's Republic of China. Mao's embalmed body is displayed for the public in a glass case.
- Born: Jeet Gannguli, Indian film score composer; in Baranagar, West Bengal state
- Died: Alfred Schild, 55, Austrian-born U.S. physicist, known for the Schild's ladder method of measurement in general relativity and for the Kerr–Schild perturbations, died of a heart attack.

== May 25, 1977 (Wednesday) ==

- The film Star Wars premiered in 32 movie theaters across the United States before reaching other cinemas nationwide. Critics who had previewed the film gave it good reviews, with Time magazine dubbing it "the year's best movie". Charles Champlin called it "the year's most razzle-dazzling family movie, an exuberant and technically astonishing space adventure". Gene Siskel commented that "'Star Wars' is not a great movie in the sense that it describes the human condition. It simply is a fun picture," with "spectacular visual effects, the best since Stanley Kubrick's 2001. Some hated the film, with one calling it "frequently boring with its fairy-tale plot", "relentlessly childish", and "no more sophisticated or believable than an old Spider Man comic book." Star Wars would go on to break the record for highest-grossing film (surpassing Jaws, The Godfather and The Sound of Music)
- Voting was held in the Netherlands for all 150 seats of the Tweede Kamer of the Staten-Generaal, after the March 26 collapse of the coalition led by Prime Minister Joop den Uyl. While den Uyl's Partij van de Arbeid (PvdA or Labor Party) gained 10 seats for a plurality of 53, the new Christian Democratic Appeal (Christen-Democratisch Appèl or CDA) of Dries van Agt and the People's Party for Freedom and Democracy (Volkspartij voor Vrijheid en Democratie or VVD) combined for a 77-seat majority.
- Ireland's President Patrick Hillery dissolved parliament at the request of Taoiseach (Prime Minister) Liam Cosgrave and scheduled new elections for the 148-seat Dáil Éireann, to take place on June 16, 1977.
- The government of South Korea observed the holiday of Buddha's Birthday (the 2,521st, according to Korean tradition) by lifting a midnight curfew, and releasing 3,319 convicted criminals and juvenile delinquents who had maintained "exemplary records" during their incarceration.
- Liverpool F.C., champion of England's Football League, defeated Borussia Mönchengladbach, champion of West Germany's Bundesliga, 3 to 1, to win the European Cup, the knockout competition of the 32 first-place teams in European nations' top soccer football leagues before a crowd of 52,078 at Rome's Olympic Stadium.
- Born: Karthik Sivakumar, Indian Tamil cinema filmmaker; in Madras, Tamil Nadu state
- Died: Lieutenant-General Willoughby Norrie, 1st Baron Norrie, 83, English officer and lord, Governor-General of New Zealand, 1952 to 1957

== May 26, 1977 (Thursday) ==
- Four days after seizing an elementary school in the Netherlands, South Moluccan terrorists released the 106 schoolchildren held hostage at the school at Bovensmilde. Four of the children had been freed earlier after becoming ill from a stomach ailment, and after 46 more contracted the same infection, the terrorists relented. The principal and five teachers remained as hostages.
- The Geneva Convention on rules of war conduct was amended at an international conference of 95 nations as participants voted, 73 to 1, to give prisoner-of-war status to captured guerrillas, equal to those of national armies. Israel cast a "no" vote, citing the danger to civilians, and 21 nations abstained.
- The civil war in Zaire's Shaba province, between the government of Zaire (now the Democratic Republic of the Congo) and rebels crossing from Angola into Zaire, ended 79 days after it had started on March 8.
- U.S. President Carter signed the 1967 Treaty of Tlatelolco, joining nations agreeing to keep nuclear weapons out of Central America, South America, and the Caribbean islands, and sent it to the U.S. Senate for ratification. Specifically, the U.S. pledged that it would not place weapons at its military bases at Puerto Rico, the Panama Canal Zone, the U.S. Virgin Islands or at the Guantanamo Bay Naval Base at Cuba.
- George Willig, who dubbed himself "The Human Fly", set a record for highest climb up the side of a building by scaling Tower 2 of the World Trade Center (WTC 2), ascending 1,350 feet (410 m) in three hours and 30 minutes. After reaching the roof, Willig "stepped onto the top to accept congratulatory handshakes and sign autographs for a squad of admiring cops who immediately took him into custody on an array of misdemeanor charges." After the city of New York initially threatened a $250,000 civil lawsuit, Mayor Abraham Beame settled its complaint with a fine of $1.10, representing a penny for each of the 110 floors climbed. Beame said afterward, "I wanted to congratulate him for his courageous act and tell him we wanted to settle the suit out of court."
- The Quebec Nordiques defeated the visiting Winnipeg Jets, 8 to 2, in Game 7 of the best-4-of-7 Avco Cup finals to win the championship of the World Hockey Association, rival to the National Hockey League. Winnipeg had forced a seventh game with their 12 to 3 win over Quebec on May 24.
- Born:
  - Luca Toni, Italian footballer and striker with 47 caps for the national team, and one of the highest scorers in Italian soccer football, with 322 career goals in 22 seasons; in Pavullo nel Frignano, province of Modena
  - Raina Telgemeier, American graphic novelist
- Died:
  - Tyrone Everett, 24, American professional boxer for the World Boxing Council junior lightweight division, with a record of 36 wins and one loss, was murdered by his girlfriend.
  - Arthur "Pappy" Chalk", 88, owner of the world's oldest continuously operating airline, died from complications of an April 13 fall. Chalk had founded Chalk's International Airlines, a seaplane service from Florida's Watson Island, in 1911 and continued to operate it until his death.
  - Meng Xiaodong, 68, Chinese opera performer, died in Taipei after having been allowed to leave the People's Republic of China in 1967 during the Cultural Revolution.

== May 27, 1977 (Friday) ==
- The crash of Aeroflot Flight 331 in Cuba killed 69 people. The four-engine Il-62M turbojet had originated in Moscow, with stops in Frankfurt and Lisbon, with a final scheduled destination of Havana when it had an engine catch fire and was attempting an emergency landing in a thick fog.
- An unsuccessful attempt to overthrow the government of Angola was crushed after former Interior Minister Nito Alves and former Angolan Army chief José Jacinto Van-Dúnem led a coup d'état against President Agostinho Neto. After his troops regained control of Radio Luanda in the nation's capital, President Neto said in a broadcast that dissidents would be punished harshly, commenting, "we must react with a certain cruelty... we must drastically treat some persons who today tried to break the peace of our capital with the intention of giving to imperialism the possibilities for new attacks on our movement." In the aftermath, thousands of Angolans would be killed by the government and by Cuban forces.
- The English punk rock group Sex Pistols released their most controversial song, "God Save the Queen", as single, ahead of their October release of the album Never Mind the Bollocks, Here's the Sex Pistols.
- Britain's independent television network, ITV ended its nine-week experiment with a morning TV news show, after having started the trial of Good Morning Calendar on ITV Yorkshire and Good Morning North on ITV Tyne Tees, concluding that the United Kingdom was not yet ready for what would later be referred to in Britain as "breakfast television". The TV genre would not be tried again until more than five years later, with the launch of the BBC program Breakfast Time on January 17, 1983.
- Born: Atsushi Yanagisawa, Japanese footballer with 58 caps for the Japan national team; in Imizu, Toyama prefecture

== May 28, 1977 (Saturday) ==
- A fire killed 165 people at the Beverly Hills Supper Club in Southgate, Kentucky, near Cincinnati. An 18-year-old busboy learned of a fire in one of the section of the club, the Zebra Room, and helped save lives of many of the 600 customers in another section, the Cabaret Room, by calmly telling people to leave and pointing out the fire exits, as well as leading groups of panicked customers outside. "The worst thing of all," Walter Bailey commented afterward, "is that most of the people didn't believe there was a fire."
- Hassan Gouled Aptidon was elected as the first President of Djibouti, 30 days in advance of its independence from France, in a vote by the 65-member National Assembly.
- The Soviet Union's 39-member Presidium approved a new constitution, with a preamble stating that "The aims of the dictatorship of the proletariat having been fulfilled, the Soviet state has become the state of the whole people," to replace the 1936 Constitution of the Soviet Union, and ordered a June 4 publication date. The new document would become official on October 7, and remain in effect until the breakup of the Soviet Union in 1991.

== May 29, 1977 (Sunday) ==
- A. J. Foyt won the Indianapolis 500, becoming the first driver to win the race four times, having previously won in 1961, 1964 and 1967. Janet Guthrie became the first woman to compete in the Indianapolis race.
- The American Professional Slo-Pitch League (APSPL) made its debut as the first nationwide professional softball league for men. It had 12 teams, the Baltimore Monuments, Chicago Storm, Cincinnati Suds, Cleveland Jaybirds, Columbus All-Americans, Detroit Caesars, Kentucky Bourbons (Louisville), Milwaukee Copper Hearth, Minnesota Goofy's (St. Paul), New Jersey Statesmen (Trenton), New York Clippers and Pittsburgh Hard Hats. In the first games (the first of doubleheaders), Milwaukee won at Baltimore, 18–17; host Pittsburgh beat Kentucky, 13–8; Minnesota beat visiting Cincinnati, 15–12; and Detroit won at Chicago, 28–21. The other four teams debuted the following Saturday.
- Born: Massimo Ambrosini, Italian footballer and defensive midfielder with 35 caps for the national team; in Pesaro
- Died:
  - Goddard Lieberson, 66, British-born U.S. record producer, president of Columbia Records and the Recording Industry Association of America
  - Bob Gassoff, 24, Canadian National Hockey League player for the St. Louis Blues, was killed when his motorcycle collided with a car near Villa Ridge, Missouri. Gassoff had played four seasons in the NHL, with his last game less than two months after the end of the NHL season.

== May 30, 1977 (Monday) ==
- A contingent of 500 Rhodesian Army troops under the command of General Peter Walls carried out Operation Aztec, an invasion of the neighboring country of Mozambique, while Rhodesian Air Force planes provided paratroopers and air cover. The white Rhodesian soldiers traveled 60 miles (97 km) into the East African nation, reached Mapai, and killed 32 fighters of the Zimbabwe African National Liberation Army.
- The dictator of Bangladesh, Major General Ziaur Rahman, won a referendum on confidence in his regime, with almost 34 million of the nation's 38 million registered voters participating. The final result showed an almost 99% endorsement, with 33,400,870 voting in his favor, and 378,898 voting against.
- 1. FC Köln won West Germany's DFB-Pokal tournament, 1 to 0, over Hertha BSC. The two teams had played to a 1 to 1 tie after extra time on May 28 and were meeting in a replay for the first time in tournament championship history. The Bundesliga would amend its rules to resolve ties after extra time with a shoot-out.
- Born: Jerrold Tarog, Philippine film director; in Manila
- Died:
  - Paul Desmond (stage name for Paul Breitenfeld), 52, American jazz saxophonist and composer for the Dave Brubeck Quartet, known for writing the hit instrumental "Take Five", died of lung cancer.
  - Wells Twombly, 41, American sportswriter, died of an undisclosed illness referred to only as "an acute internal disorder."

== May 31, 1977 (Tuesday) ==
- A team of mountain climbers from the Army of India became the first persons to ascend the northeast side of Kangchenjunga, third-highest mountain in the world, a feat that had eluded mountaineers since the first attempt made 45 years earlier in 1932. Colonel Narendra Kumar led the group of 18 people (16 climbers and two doctors), and two climbers, Major Prem Chand and the Sherpa Naik Nima Dorje, reached the summit.
- Born: Domenico Fioravanti, Italian swimmer and Olympic gold medalist; in Novara
- Died: William Castle (stage name for William Schloss Jr.), 63, American film producer and director known for the 1968 production of Rosemary's Baby, died of a heart attack.
