= Vladimir Zakhmatov =

Expert in fire-fighting

Vladimir Zakhmatov (born 17 February 1954 in Makhalino village, Kuznetskiy district, Penza region, Russia, USSR) is an independent expert at the international level of explosions and fire-fighting, well-known scientist in the field of physics of combustion and explosion, developer of modern impulse fire-extinguishing devices and systems, Doctor of Engineering Sciences, Professor, active member of the International Academy of Ecology and Safety (Russian Federation), the New York Academy of Sciences (USA), Ukrainian Academy of Life Safety (Ukraine).

He is an author of over 270 research papers, including 2 monographs, 1 textbook, 3 patents of the Russian Federation, 3 European patents, 6 patents of Ukraine, a number of articles in international specialized journals.

== Biography ==
Vladimir Zakhmatov was born on 17 February 1954 in the village of Makhalino, Kuznetskiy district, Penza region, Soviet Russia, in the family of public servants. His mother, Lyubov Mikhaylina-Breguet, was a doctor (descendant of Swiss watchmakers, founders of the "Breguet" company; her ancestors moved to Russia in 1860); and his father, Dmitri Zakhmatov, was an economist. Both parents volunteered in the World War II: his father served as a trooper from July 1941 (the defense of Kyiv to Berlin attack), and his mother was a nurse in Stalingrad in 1942 to Prague.

In 1960 the family moved to the city of Chapaevsk, Kuibyshev region. The characteristic aspects of the city, which at that time was military and industrial and chemical center of defense production, defined in many ways the Vladimir´s later choice of profession.

In 1977 V. Zakhmatov graduated from the Samara (Kuibyshev) Polytechnic Institute with a degree in Chemistry and Technology of High-Molecular Compounds (0815 - Powder and solid rocket motor fuel). As a student, he started conducting research on explosives sensibility characteristics.

After graduation, he worked as a test-engineer of ballistic test of ammunition (calibre size from 23 to 152mm, incl. air guns with solid rocket motors). Later, Zakhmatov worked as a technologist of assembling, equipment, ammunition control, searching and destroying malfunctioning weapons. He participated as an expert in finding unapproved explosions during arming and testing of the ammunition at the place of production, warehouses, training areas and other explosive objects. In 1980, Vladimir Zakhmatov was invited to the E. O. Paton Electric Welding Institute in Ukraine to conduct research on welding explosion. For two years, he worked as a senior engineer in cutting methods, stamping, welding with the aid of explosion. His field work included working with gas and oil pipelines from Ufa to Tyumen, as well as at the Antonov PD. At that time, the USSR was developing new technologies for effective construction of oil and gas pipeline networks, including methods to cut damaged, dangerous sections, welding etc. Explosion aided metal-treatment technologies proved very effective, but also dangerous. As part of his assignments, Vladimir Zakhmatov developed an efficient compact fire-and explosion safety method.

Since 1983, Vladimir worked as a junior research associate at the Department of Geodynamics of Explosion at the Institute of Geophysics under the National Academy of Sciences of Ukraine. In 1985, he headed the experimental production engineering unit at the Institute of Thermophysics at the National Academy of Sciences of Ukraine.

In 1984, Vladimir defended his Ph.D. thesis in Engineering Science on the subject of Development of Methods of Dry Chemical Powder Explosive Supply in the Body of Fire in Academic Council of the Moscow Institute of Fire Safety (Higher Engineering and Technical School of the USSR Ministry of Internal Affairs).

Since May 1, 1986 Vladimir Zakhmatov took part in eliminating the consequences of the Chernobyl Nuclear Catastrophe. He introduced a new highly efficient high-precision technology for forest fire extinguishing in highly contaminated areas (radiation level from 1000 to 2500 roentgen per hour, incl. "Red Forest"). Vladimir Zakhmatov´s method was employed in the hard-to-reach areas, and prevented the spread of radioactive dust from the destroyed reactor by fixing the particles on the ground. Since 1988, he is the consultant of planners of Shelter ("Ukrytie") protection system over the damaged Unit 4 of the Chernobyl Nuclear Plant. He participated as consultant at operation of fire-fighting of great fire of radioactive forest at Chernobyl Area in 27-29 April, 2015.

From 1987-1996 he was the Head of the Laboratory Department and Defense Technologies Department at the Institute of Materials Science under the National Academy of Sciences of Ukraine.

In 1990, Vladimir Zakhmatov defended his thesis for the degree of Doctor of Engineering on the subject of "Development of firing system with impulse multidimensional protection", with degrees in "Technology of specialty products" (code: 05.17.10) and "Combustion and explosion Physics" (code: 01.04.17) at the Academic Council of Kazan Research Institute of Chemical Products and Polytechnic University. The same year, he was awarded the lapel badge for Honored Inventor of the USSR for his first implemented invention. In 1994 V. Zakhmatov completed his training in the United States (Simeon Institute at the Department of State, Washington DC), and obtained a diploma in Control Management of Emergency Situations.

Since 1994 Zakhmatov became a public member of the New York Academy of Sciences and in 1995, a public member of the International Academy of Sciences in Ecology and Safety (Russia).

During 1996-2007 Vladimir Zakhmatov held a position of chairperson of Life Safety at the Cherkassy State University of Technology, then at the "Kyiv Polytechnic Institute" National Technical University and professor at the National Aviation University, he also gave lectures at the Criminality’s Expert Examination Department of Police Academy of the Ministry of Internal Affairs Academy of Ukraine, and at the Institute of weapons and military equipment of the Armed Forces of Ukraine.

In 1999, the Higher Attestation Commission of Ukraine awarded title of Professor at the Department of Life Safety to Prof. V. Zakhmatov.

Since 2000, he’s a member of the Ukrainian Academy of Life Safety.

In 2007-2014 V. D. Zakhmatov worked at the Institute of Telecommunications and Global Information Space of the National Academy of Sciences of Ukraine, and lectured at the Department of National Security of National Academy of Public Administration under the President of Ukraine. Since 2014 V. D. Zakhmatov is professor of "Fire Safety" department at the Military Technical Education and Security Institute of St. Petersburg State Polytechnic University, Chief research scientist in the Institute of Ocean of Russian Academy of Science, professor of Ecology State Academy, Kyiv.

After 1987 professor V. Zakhmatov participated in 23 great fire-fighting operations, for test his devices and mobile systems at hard-to-reach emergency areas – toxically, mined, mountains, canyons at Russia, Ukraine, Poland, Israel. Since February 2008, Prof. Zakhmatov has conducted more than twenty independent inquiries of explosions and large fires with fatal casualties. In particular, they were - the explosion in Lviv city in a three-storey residential building; explosion in a 5-storey building in Yevpatoriya; firesetting of pinball saloon in Dnepropetrovsk, explosion in coal port terminal in Sevastopol, investigation of the gas cylinders explosion in Luhansk hospital. Prof. Zakhmatov has spoken in court about his findings on many accounts.

The motto of scientific work of Vladimir Zakhmatov is to personally test his own developments to make sure they are safe for people and the environment.[5]

Prof. Zakhmatov is fond of swimming; he is a master of sport in 800m and 1500m range. He is also interested in reading Russian classic writers and historical books.

== Research field ==
Directional explosion physics, explosives, mechanics and dynamics of changing environments, technologies of impulse diffusion of protective solutions for post-accident clean-up, prevention of terrorist attacks V. D. Zakhmatov has done work in the following engineering subjects:

- development of new fire and detonation extensive weapons (US patent pending);
- methods and pulse engineering for multidimensional protection of:
  1. various fire extinguishing;
  2. light and thermal protection and concealment;
  3. prevention of mass explosions;
  4. toxic and radioactive discharge localization;
  5. localization of oil spill on water surface;
  6. mass disorders control;
  7. neutralization of terrorists and raiders

Vladimir Zakhmatov has implemented a number of developments in the form of experimental series that were used in the USSR and currently are in use in Russia, Ukraine, Poland, Israel, China, and Switzerland:

- 50-barrel "Impulse-3M" installation based on a Т-62, Т-55, Т-54 tank platform;
- 7-, 8-, 9-, 16-, 25-barrel installations on different trailers, which were widely used in the Chernobyl area as immobile elements of automatic systems for extinguishing in dangerous buildings and switch-yards, for extinguishing vast fires in well clusters at oil and gas offshore platform in the Caspian Sea, for extinguishing burning ammunition piles, for oil spills localizing at sea surface using a large-scale and long-distance biosorbents spraying;
- Helicopter hanging fire-extinguishing container and multi-container platforms that were used for extinguishing forest fires in Chernobyl area (1986), in the mountains and gorges of Crimea, the Carpathian mountains, the Southern Urals (1992-2003), in swamp forests of the Moscow region (2001), for forest fire extinguishing in Russia (2010), for extinguishing disastrous forest fire on the Mount Carmel plateau, Haifa (Israel). The Russian government equipped some emergency units of Ministry of Civil Defense and Emergency Response with fire-extinguishing containers for forest fire fighting;
- Professional long-range fire extinguisher (7 different designs). An experimental series of 50 pieces were produced for the Ministry of Emergency Situations of Ukraine. More than 10 items were successfully used in a fire station in the Moscow region, an experimental batch was released in 2009 in Switzerland by «Pyromex» and «Highland Technologies» companies;
- Household fire extinguisher. Unique handheld mini fire extinguishers were released in an experimental series of 15,000 pieces at the commission of the MSS for Moscow Olympic Games: 3 attempts of self-immolation and up 150 small fires were prevented, a few dozen of fights were ceased;
- Automated multidimensional protection systems for military equipment:
  1. In tanks, they have saved lives of crew members and even the vehicle itself from fire, even if shaped-charge projectile hit it;
  2. In helicopters, in case of crashing shoot down helicopter fire and explosion were prevented. Both options as prototype models were tested successfully in Afghanistan;
  3. In submarines, systems of non-toxic extinguishing in the compartments were successfully tested.

Multidimensional protection systems have also been developed to mask missile launching sites from satellite surveillance and precision weapons, for tanks and ships hiding from precision weapons, and for underground government structures and subways they were as unique means of a non-toxic fire extinguishing.

== International recognition ==
V. Zakhmatov is an active participant in the work of international anti-terrorist and anti-criminal organizations such as MAE and MAK.

Professor Zakhmatov has lectured at universities in Russia, the USA, Israel, Switzerland, Poland, Czech Republic and Estonia.

Since 1982, Vladimir Zakhmatov participated in extinguishing a number of large fires with models of his equipment:

- in factories producing explosives, in armories, storage and equipment ammunition bases, in factories and warehouses of toxic chemicals in a number of European countries;
- in gas-wells, oil-processing plants, oil storages, oil offshore platforms in different countries;
- in forests, including remote areas of accidents and disasters, in mountains, gorges of the USSR, Russia, Ukraine, Poland and Israel.

== Honors and awards ==
- 1987 — Responder medal of first category at Chernobyl Nuclear Plant accident.
- 1996 — Medal Of Merit of the Ministry of Emergency Situations of Ukraine.
- 2004 — National Economy Achievement Exhibition Gold Medal for the development of new non-lethal equipment for terrorist attacks cease.
- 2005 — Medal Of Merit of Ukrainian Defense Ministry.
- 2011 — Medal "For Courage and Honor. 25 years of the Chernobyl accident" (Ukraine) for implementing of new technology of high-precision desolate fire extinguishing in highly radioactive areas.
- 2011 — Memorial sign "In commemoration of the disaster at the Chernobyl Power Plant" (Russian Federation).

== Main works ==
1. V. D. Zakhmatov Technology of multidimensional protection. — М.: IAM SA USSR, 1991. — 124 p.
2. V. D. Zakhmatov, I. P. Krasiuk, A. A. Sadchenko, N. V. Shcherbak, U. A. Maznichenko. Explosives and explosive devices. Textbook. — K.: National Academy of Internal Affairs, 2004. — 324 p.
3. V. D. Zakhmatov Pulse engineering in Chernobyl. / ISSN 0869-7493 Fire and explosion safety. Moscow. T.19 2010, no. 4, pp. 49 – 52.
4. V. D. Zkahmatov, N. V. Shcherbak New localization technologies of oil spill at sea. // ISSN 0869-7493 Fire and explosion safety. Moscow. 2010. T.19, no. 6, pp. 56 – 63.
5. V. D. Zakhmatov Fukushima is new Chernobyl, but mistakes are the same. / Fire Safety in construction, Moscow, no. 2, April 2011, pp. 52 – 61.
6. V. D. Zakhmatov, N. V. Shcherbak Hand weapon of firefighter for forest, skyscrapers and disaster areas fires extinguishing. / Fire Safety in construction, Moscow, no. 3, June 2011, pp. 58–65.
7. V. D. Zakhmatov. Pulse, gasdispersive jets. / Physics of combustion and explosion. 1994, № 3, р. 70-75.
8. V. D. Zakhmatov, Impulse extinguishing from the Ukraine. / "Fire international" UK, March, 1998, p 29.
9. V. D. Zakhmatov, Firefighters in radioactive zone the Chernobyl experience. /"Fire international" UK, March, 1999, p,27-28.
10. V. D. Zakhmatov, I.Bondarenko. Non-lethal weapon as effective stop of terrorist attacks. // Russian news. № 1 (2105 с 11.1990), 14 January 2013, p. 2-3.
