= Kuznetsk =

Town in Penza Oblast, Russia

Kuznetsk Кузнецк
- Town
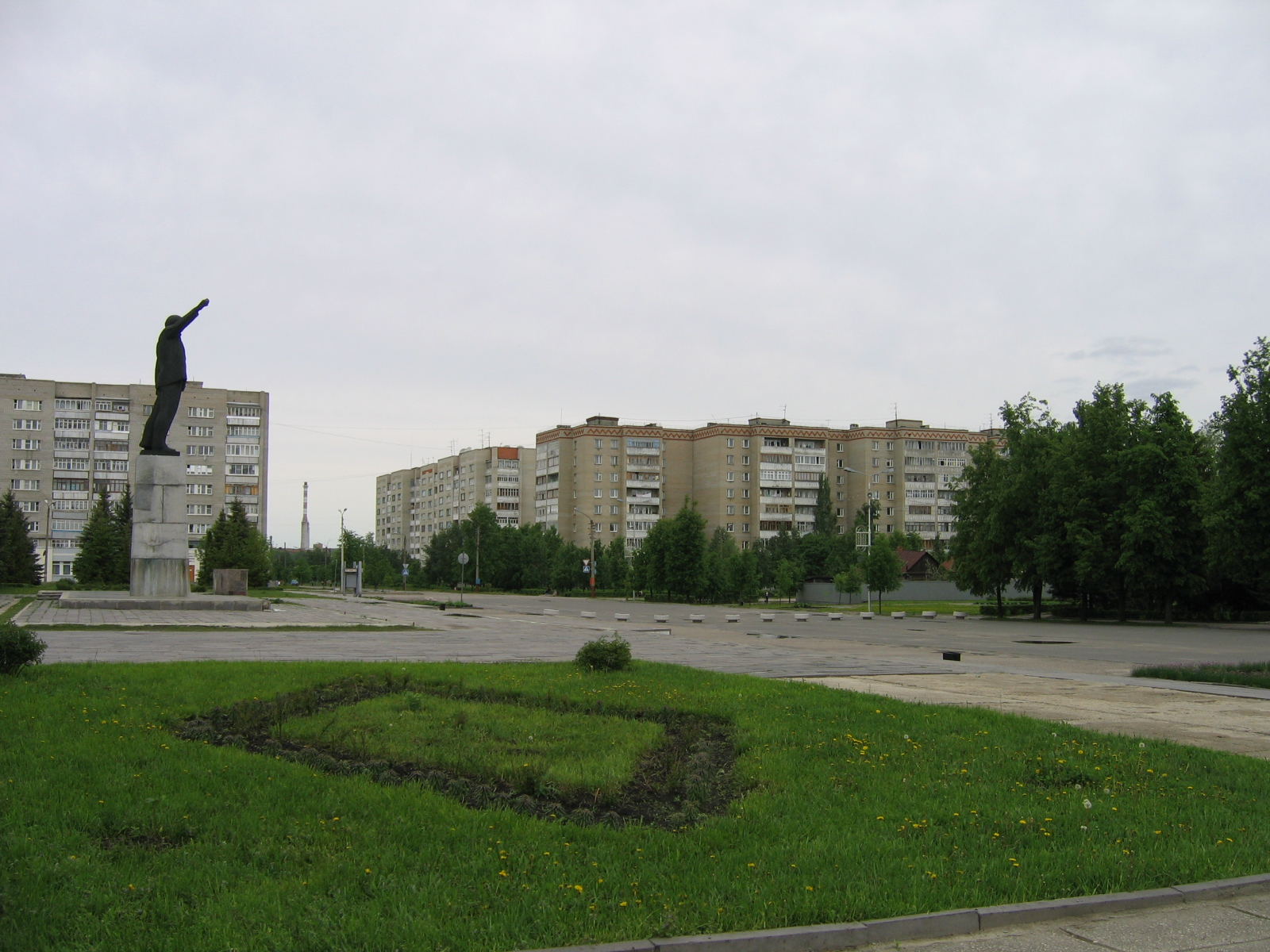
- Central square in Kuznetsk

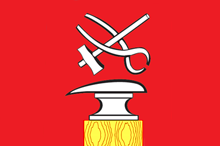
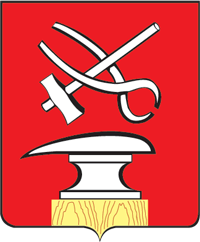
- Flag Coat of arms
- Interactive map of Kuznetsk
- Location of Kuznetsk Kuznetsk (Penza Oblast)
- Coordinates: 53°07′N 46°36′E
- Country: Russia
- Federal subject: Penza Oblast
- Founded: 1699
- Town status since: 1780

Area
  - Total: 42.08 km^{2} (16.25 sq mi)
- Elevation: 240 m (790 ft)

Population (2010 Census)
  - Total: 88,839
  - Estimate (2025): 88,806 (−0%)
  - Rank: 189th in 2010
  - Density: 2,111/km^{2} (5,468/sq mi)

Administrative status
  - Subordinated to: town of oblast significance of Kuznetsk
  - Capital of: Kuznetsky District, town of oblast significance of Kuznetsk

Municipal status
  - Urban okrug: Kuznetsk Urban Okrug
  - Capital of: Kuznetsk Urban Okrug, Kuznetsky Municipal District
- Time zone: UTC+3 (MSK)
- Postal codes: 442530–442535, 442537–442539, 442541–442544, 442549
- Dialing code: +7 84157
- OKTMO ID: 56705000001
- Website: gorodkuzneck.ru

Kuznetsk (Russian: Кузне́цк, IPA: [kʊzʲˈnʲetsk]) is a town in Penza Oblast, Russia, located in the foothills of the Volga Upland, mainly on the left bank of the Truyov River. Population: 88,839 (2010 census); 92,050 (2002 census); 98,588 (1989 Soviet census).

== Administrative and municipal status ==
Within Russia's framework of administrative divisions, Kuznetsk serves as the administrative center of Kuznetsky District, even though it does not form a part of it. As an administrative division, it is incorporated separately as the town of oblast significance of Kuznetsk—an administrative unit with the status equal to that of the districts. As a municipal division, the town of oblast significance of Kuznetsk is incorporated as Kuznetsk Urban Okrug.

== History ==
Vasily Naryshkin founded the settlement of Truyovo on the river Truyov in 1699. It became known as Truyovo-Voskresenskoe and then as Naryshkino. An ukaz of Catherine II renamed the village Kuznetsk in November 1780.

During the Soviet era the Duvanny Ravine was used as a place of execution and burial between 1918 and the 1930s. In 1997 a commemorative wooden cross was erected there.

== Twin towns and sister cities ==
Kuznetsk is twinned with:

- Gyula, Hungary (1970)
- Dimitrovgrad, Russia (1972)
