= Yevgeny Rodionov =

Russian soldier (1977–1996)

- Born: Yevgeny Aleksandrovich Rodionov; 23 May 1977; Chibirley, Penza Oblast, Russian SFSR, USSR
- Died: 23 May 1996 (aged 19) suburbs of Bamut, Chechen Republic of Ichkeria
- Cause of death: Execution by beheading
- Military career
- Allegiance: Russian Federation
- Branch: FSS Border Service
- Service years: 1995–1996
- Rank: Private
- Unit: 2631 Border Troops
- Conflicts: First Chechen War: Battle of Bamut (executed)
- Awards: Order of Courage (posthumously)

Yevgeny Aleksandrovich Rodionov (Russian: Евге́ний Алекса́ндрович Родио́нов; 23 May 1977 – 23 May 1996) was a Russian soldier who was taken prisoner of war by Chechen rebels in the First Chechen War and later executed in captivity. He has gained much admiration throughout Russia for the circumstances of his death, as his execution allegedly resulted from his refusal to remove his cross necklace, convert to Islam and defect to the enemy side. Despite widespread popular veneration, he has not been glorified by the Russian Orthodox Church as a New Martyr due to lack of evidence about his death. Still, icons depicting him are installed in many churches across Russia, in St. Valery church in Chișinău, in the Greek Orthodox Church of St. George in Frankfurt in Germany, and in St. Nicholas Greek Orthodox Church in Tacoma, Washington, United States.

== Early life ==
Yevgeny Rodionov was born on 23 May 1977 in the village of Chibirley, Kuznetsky District, Penza Oblast, to Lyubov Vasiliyevna and Aleksandr Konstantinovich Rodionov. His father was a carpenter and furniture maker. His mother had a degree in furniture technologies.

In 1978, he was baptized as a Russian Orthodox at the age of one year, but wore no cross necklace until the first one was given to him in 1988 or 1989, while attending church together with his grandmother. His mother disapproved, but Yevgeny never removed the cross; later he began wearing it with a small string instead of the original chain. After finishing ninth grade at a rural school of Kurilovo in Moscow Oblast, he began to work at a furniture factory and trained to be a driver. Yevgeny’s parents, Aleksandr and Lyubov Rodionov separated when he was about six or seven.

== Military service and capture ==
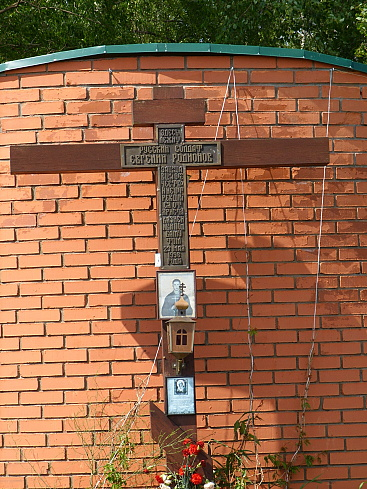
A cross on Yevgeny Rodionov's tomb in Satino-Russkoye village

Though Rodionov aspired to be a cook, he was conscripted into the Armed Forces of the Russian Federation on 25 June 1995. His training took place in 2631 Military Unit of Russian Border Troops in Ozersk, Kaliningrad Oblast. On 10 July 1995, he took the military oath. Rodionov was deployed to Chechnya, where he served in the Russian army's border troops as an RPG operator at the 3rd border outpost of the 3rd Motorised Manoeuvre Group of the 479th Border Troops Special Operations Unit (No. 3807).

On 13 January 1996, Rodionov was deployed to the Caucasus Special Border District, serving in the Nazran Border Unit (No. 2094). A month later, on 14 February 1996, accompanied by privates Andrey Trusov, Igor Yakovlev, and Alexander Zheleznov, he went to mount guard over a road. During their duty, they stopped an ambulance car transporting weapons and driven by Chechen Republic of Ichkeria brigade general Ruslan Khaikhoroev. During their attempt to examine the ambulance, all four soldiers were overpowered by a dozen Chechen rebels and taken prisoner. Initially, the soldiers were announced as deserters, and military police came to Rodionov's mother's home to search for her missing son. Only after the detailed survey of the checkpoint did military police discover traces of blood and evidence of fighting; the three missing soldiers then were declared missed in action and possible prisoners of war. Rodionov's mother, Lyubov, went to Chechnya, but Rodionov's unit commander told her only that her son had been captured. Shamil Basayev promised to help Lyubov to find her son. Only after paying a large sum of money did Lyubov find the corpse of her son, along with the corpses of his fellow soldiers that were captured along with him.

An unconfirmed, unsourced report detailing the events leading to Rodionov's death was published by Pravda.ru on 23 May 1996.

Rodionov's cross was given to St. Nicholas Church in Pyzhy. His body was buried in Moscow, at the Ascension Church near Satino-Russkoye village.

Aleksandr Rodionov, Yevgeny's father, died 5 days after his son's burial.

== Veneration ==
Yevgeny Rodionov was posthumously awarded the Order of Courage. A popular movement within the Russian Orthodox Church has sought his canonisation as a martyr. According to his mother and some supporters, Rodionov was executed because he refused to remove his cross necklace and convert to Islam. Some Russian soldiers have reportedly prayed before his image.

=== Position of the Moscow Patriarchate ===
The Synodal Commission for Canonisation has not formally glorified Rodionov. Secretary Maksim Maksimov explained that the primary evidence of his martyrdom comes from his mother, that the Church does not typically canonise those killed in war, and that the era of new martyrs ended with the fall of the Bolshevik regime. Nevertheless, Patriarch Alexy II blessed a popular account of his life.

Opponents of this decision, such as priest Alexander Shargunov, argue that popular veneration and reported miracles at Rodionov's grave justify canonisation, and that captivity differs from combat death.

=== Unofficial icons ===
Despite the lack of official canonisation, icons depicting Rodionov in military dress with a cross have been produced and are displayed in some churches, including in Russia, Moldova, Germany, and the United States.
