= Chibirley =

Village in Penza Oblast, Russia

Coordinates: 52.98°N 46.62°E

Chibirley (Russian: Чибирлей) is a village in Penza Oblast, Russia, roughly 410 miles (660 km) southeast of Moscow.

== Notable residents ==
- Yevgeny Rodionov (1977–1996), Russian soldier and martyr captured and executed by Chechen militants in the First Chenchen War
