= 1923 Racine Legion season =

National Football League team season

- Head coach: Babe Ruetz
- Home stadium: Horlick Field

Results
- Record: 4–4–2
- League place: 10th in NFL

The 1923 Horlick–Racine Legion season was their second in the National Football League (NFL). The Racine, Wisconsin team failed to improve on their previous season's record of 6–4–1, winning only four games. They finished tenth in the league.

== Background ==
The Racine Legion was promoted and financed by the Racine, Wisconsin, post of the American Legion from 1921. The team was additionally sponsored by William Horlick, president of a prominent malted milk company and was formally known as Horlick–Racine Legion in reflection of the corporate connection. Expenses considerably exceeded the revenue generated by ticket sales, with the Legion post making up the difference through the solicitation of donations and the hosting of money-raising entertainment events.

The team played on "Horlick's Athletic Field," presumably a company-owned grounds. The field had a new $17,000 grandstand constructed for the 1923 season, as well as some new open bleachers along the north sideline, with previously-existing stands moved across to the south sideline.

Despite sponsorship funds, the Legion franchise racked up a significant deficit during 1922 and 1923 and prospects were gloomy for continuation in the National Football League for a third season unless additional funding was secured. The idea was hatched by local fans to subsidize operations through the organized collection of $10 donations to the Legion Football Fund, with a goal of raising $10,000 for the 1924 season. This money was to be held in trust until at least $5,000 was raised or a 1924 football team assured with a May 15, 1924, deadline. Money collected in conjunction with the campaign was to be used to cover future expenses rather than for the purposes of retiring the post's debt. The local daily newspaper, the Racine News-Times, donated advertising space to help raise the profile of the fundraising effort.

== Schedule ==
The Legion's initial schedule, announced September 12 by team manager George G. "Babe" Ruetz called for a balanced schedule of 12 National League games — 6 home and 6 away. In addition to the 10 games ultimately played, away dates to play the Toledo Maroons and a December 9 finale playing the Akron Pros were slated.

Game	Date	Opponent	Result	Record	Venue	Attendance	Recap	Sources
1	September 30	Toledo Maroons	T 7–7	0–0–1	Horlick Field	3,500	Recap	
2	October 7	Chicago Bears	L 0–3	0–1–1	Horlick Field	5,000	Recap	
3	October 14	at Milwaukee Badgers	T 7–7	0–1–2	Athletic Park	4,000	Recap	
4	October 21	Akron Pros	W 9–7	1–1–2	Horlick Field		Recap	
5	October 28	at Green Bay Packers	W 24–3	2–1–2	Bellevue Park	2,800	Recap	
6	November 4	at Minneapolis Marines	L 6–13	2–2–2	Nicollet Park	1,200	Recap	
7	November 11	Green Bay Packers	L 0–16	2–3–2	Horlick Field	3,500	Recap	
—	November 18	at Toledo Maroons	canceled					
8	November 25	at Chicago Cardinals	W 10–4	3–3–2	Comiskey Park	7,000	Recap	
9	November 29	Milwaukee Badgers	L 0–16	3–4–2	Horlick Field		Recap	
10	December 2	Minneapolis Marines	W 23–0	4–4–2	Horlick Field		Recap	
—	December 9	at Akron Pros	canceled					
Note: Thanksgiving Day: November 29.

== Standings ==
Coupon soliciting $10 donations (about $180 in 2024 dollars) to help ensure the NFL's Racine Legion would remain in operations in 1924.

NFL standings
	W	L	T	PCT	PF	PA	STK
Canton Bulldogs	11	0	1	1.000	246	19	W5
Chicago Bears	9	2	1	.818	123	35	W1
Green Bay Packers	7	2	1	.778	85	34	W5
Milwaukee Badgers	7	2	3	.778	100	49	W1
Cleveland Indians	3	1	3	.750	52	49	L1
Chicago Cardinals	8	4	0	.667	161	56	L1
Duluth Kelleys	4	3	0	.571	35	33	L3
Buffalo All-Americans	5	4	3	.556	94	43	L1
Columbus Tigers	5	4	1	.556	119	35	L1
Toledo Maroons	3	3	2	.500	35	66	L1
Racine Legion	4	4	2	.500	86	76	W1
Rock Island Independents	2	3	3	.400	84	62	L1
Minneapolis Marines	2	5	2	.286	48	81	L1
St. Louis All-Stars	1	4	2	.200	25	74	L1
Hammond Pros	1	5	1	.167	14	59	L4
Akron Pros	1	6	0	.143	25	74	W1
Dayton Triangles	1	6	1	.143	16	95	L2
Oorang Indians	1	10	0	.091	50	257	W1
Louisville Brecks	0	3	0	.000	0	90	L3
Rochester Jeffersons	0	4	0	.000	6	141	L4

Note: Tie games were not officially counted in the standings until 1972.

== Roster ==
All players from the 1922 Legion roster returned for training camp in mid-September, ahead of the 1923 season, with the exception of Don Murray, who left pro football to accept a position as the athletic director at a school for boys in upstate New York. One key addition for the new season was Shorty Barr, quarterback for the Wisconsin Badgers in 1922.

Players who spent time on the Legion roster included the following, with the number of games played in parentheses. Uniform numbers are those of the 17 players on the team's opening day roster. There is no record that the guard Tong or the back Lunde ever saw action in an NFL game.

There were no future members of the Pro Football Hall of Fame on the team, although blocking back Chuck Dressen went on to have a 50 year career in Major League Baseball as a player and manager. Four players were former College Football All-Americans: Hank Gillo of Colgate, Rowdy Elliott and Paul Meyers of Wisconsin, and Milt Romney of the University of Chicago.

Linemen

- A. C. Baur (1)
- #2 Art Braman (6)
- #18 Earl Gorman (10)
- Robert "Death" Halladay (7)
- George Hartong (8)
- #10 Fritz Heinisch (6)
- #14 Jack Hueller (9)
- #6 Bill McCaw (3)
- Paul Meyers (9)
- #15 Candy Miller (6)
- #3 Jack Mintun (10)
- Al Pierotti (1)
- #12 Fritz Roeseler (6)
- #17 Len Smith (10)
- Howard Stark (3)
- #13 Tong

Backs

- #9 Shorty Barr (9)
- Jimmy Baxter (1)
- Chuck Dressen (1)
- #11 Al Elliott (10)
- #16 Bob Foster (8)
- #1 Hank Gillo - captain (10)
- #7 Irv Langhoff (4)
- #5 Lunde
- #8 Jack Milton (2)
- Milt Romney (8)
- Rollie Williams (2)
