= 1923 Duluth Kelleys season =

National Football League team season

- Owner: Marshall C. Gebert; Dewey Scanlon; Joey Sternaman; Dan "Doc" Williams
- Head coach: Joey Sternaman
- Home stadium: Athletic Park

Results
- Record: 4–3 (NFL) (8–3 overall)
- League place: 7th NFL

The 1923 Duluth Kelleys season was their inaugural season in the National Football League (NFL). The team — typically referred to by their official name, Kelley–Duluth, in the press of the day — finished 4–3, seventh place in the 17-team league.

The team was captained by a former and future Chicago Bear, Joey Sternaman, younger brother of that team's co-owner and leading offensive star, Dutch Sternaman.

== Background ==
The Hotel Sherman in Chicago, site of the January 1923 meeting that accepted Kelley-Duluth into the NFL.

Sometime in 1922, representatives of what would become the Kelley-Duluth football team made application to the National Football League (NFL) for a franchise. This effort paid dividends in January 1923, when the club was invited to send a representative to the league's annual scheduling meeting, held at the Hotel Sherman in Chicago. Joining Duluth's representative would be the delegates of professional clubs from four other cities: St. Louis, Detroit, and Cleveland.

Four individuals acted in partnership to gain an NFL team for Duluth, each putting up $250 to cover the league's franchise fee. These were Marshall C. Gebert, the manager of Kelley's Hardware of Duluth — a frequent sponsor of sports teams; Dewey Scanlon, a former collegiate quarterback at Valparaiso University; Dan "Doc" Williams, a center from St. Cloud, Minnesota; and Joey Sternaman, a diminutive star quarterback from the University of Illinois.

Membership in the "big time" NFL was seen as a means of increasing the level of competition and interest in local football games. Team manager Dewey Scanlon expressed hope that games could be scheduled with the major professional teams of the region, including the Milwaukee Badgers, Green Bay Packers, Chicago Bears, and Canton Bulldogs. "At least five big games will be played here" with Duluth's admission into the league, it was confidently predicted.

Kelley Hardware became the primary sponsor of the team, providing red-and-white jerseys emblazoned "Kelley Duluth," the formal name of the team.

More than 100 gridiron hopefuls from the Minnesota and Wisconsin area turned up for tryouts for the Kelley-Duluth team.

== Schedule ==
Game	Date	Opponent	Result	Record	Venue	Attendance	Recap	Sources
—	September 16	Ironwood Legion	W 7–0	—	Duluth Athletic Park	3,000	—	
—	September 23	Bessemer Legion	W 15–0	—	Duluth Athletic Park	3,000	—	
1	September 30	Akron Pros	W 10–7	1–0	Duluth Athletic Park	3,000	Recap	
2	October 7	at Minneapolis Marines	W 10–0	2–0	Nicollet Park	2,500	Recap	
—	October 14	Hibbing Rangers	W 6–0	—	Duluth Athletic Park	"largest crowd of season"	—	
3	October 21	Hammond Pros	W 3–0	3–0	Duluth Athletic Park	4,000	Recap	
4	October 28	Minneapolis Marines	W 9–0	4–0	Duluth Athletic Park	3,000	Recap	
—	November 4	at Ironwood Legion	W 9–7	—	Ironwood Ball Park	"record crowd"	—	
5	November 11	at Milwaukee Badgers	L 3–6	4–1	Athletic Park	5,000	Recap	
6	November 18	at Chicago Cardinals	L 0–10	4–2	Comiskey Park	5,500	Recap	
7	November 25	at Green Bay Packers	L 0–10	4–3	Bellevue Park	3,000	Recap	
Note: Games in italics indicate a non-NFL opponent.

== Standings ==
Halfback Wally Gilbert's punting ability was a field possession weapon for Kelley–Duluth.

NFL standings
	W	L	T	PCT	PF	PA	STK
Canton Bulldogs	11	0	1	1.000	246	19	W5
Chicago Bears	9	2	1	.818	123	35	W1
Green Bay Packers	7	2	1	.778	85	34	W5
Milwaukee Badgers	7	2	3	.778	100	49	W1
Cleveland Indians	3	1	3	.750	52	49	L1
Chicago Cardinals	8	4	0	.667	161	56	L1
Duluth Kelleys	4	3	0	.571	35	33	L3
Buffalo All-Americans	5	4	3	.556	94	43	L1
Columbus Tigers	5	4	1	.556	119	35	L1
Toledo Maroons	3	3	2	.500	35	66	L1
Racine Legion	4	4	2	.500	86	76	W1
Rock Island Independents	2	3	3	.400	84	62	L1
Minneapolis Marines	2	5	2	.286	48	81	L1
St. Louis All-Stars	1	4	2	.200	25	74	L1
Hammond Pros	1	5	1	.167	14	59	L4
Akron Pros	1	6	0	.143	25	74	W1
Dayton Triangles	1	6	1	.143	16	95	L2
Oorang Indians	1	10	0	.091	50	257	W1
Louisville Brecks	0	3	0	.000	0	90	L3
Rochester Jeffersons	0	4	0	.000	6	141	L4

Note: Tie games were not officially counted in the standings until 1972.

== Roster ==
Duluth end Dick O'Donnell was named a third team NFL All-Pro in 1923 by a vote of 15 sportswriters from NFL cities.

The 1923 Kelleys featured Joe Sternaman, younger brother of Dutch Sternaman — co-owner and offensive star of the Chicago Bears. The following individuals played at least one game with Kelley-Duluth during the 1923 season. The total number of NFL league games played during the year follows in parentheses.

Linemen

- Roddy Dunn (2)
- Ike Haaven (3)
- Art Johnson (7)
- Howard Kiley (7) †
- Lake
- Louchs †
- John Madigan (7) †
- Red Morse (1)
- Dick O'Donnell (7) †
- Joe Rooney (7) †
- Bill Stein (6)
- Whitmore †
- Doc Williams (6) †

Backs

- Wally Gilbert (7) †
- Ken Harris (6) †
- Mickey MacDonnell (1)
- Russ Method (7) †
- Bill Rooney (5)
- Joey Sternaman - captain (7) †

†- Designates a starter in the non-league season opener against Ironwood, Michigan.
