= 1923 Toledo Maroons season =

National Football League team season

- Head coach: Guil Falcon
- Home stadium: Armory Park

Results
- Record: 3–3–2
- Division place: 10th NFL
- Playoffs: No playoffs until 1932

The 1923 NFL season was the second season of the Toledo Maroons in the National Football League. The team failed to improve on their previous output of 5–2–2, winning only three games. They finished tenth in the league.

== Schedule ==
Game	Date	Opponent	Result	Record	Venue	Attendance	Recap	Sources
1	September 30	at Racine Legion	T 7–7	0–0–1	Horlick Field	3,500	Recap	
2	October 7	Oorang Indians	W 7–0	1–0–1	Armory Park	5,000	Recap	
—	October 14	at Cleveland Indians	canceled by Cleveland owner to avert financial loss					
3	October 21	Dayton Triangles	W 6–3	2–0–1	Armory Park	3,000	Recap	
4	October 28	Columbus Tigers	L 0–3	2–1–1	Armory Park	5,000	Recap	
—	November 4	at Dayton Triangles	canceled over Toledo financial demands					
—	November 4	at Hammond Pros	canceled due to rain					
5	November 11	at Columbus Tigers	L 0–16	2–2–1	Neil Park		Recap	
—	November 18	Racine Legion	canceled					
6	November 24	at Rochester Jeffersons	W 12–6	3–2–1	Edgerton Park		Recap	
7	November 25	at Buffalo All-Americans	T 3–3	3–2–2	Canisius Villa		Recap	
8	November 29	at Canton Bulldogs	L 0–28	3–3–2	Lakeside Park	3,000	Recap	
Note: Thanksgiving Day: November 29.

== Standings ==
NFL standings
	W	L	T	PCT	PF	PA	STK
Canton Bulldogs	11	0	1	1.000	246	19	W5
Chicago Bears	9	2	1	.818	123	35	W1
Green Bay Packers	7	2	1	.778	85	34	W5
Milwaukee Badgers	7	2	3	.778	100	49	W1
Cleveland Indians	3	1	3	.750	52	49	L1
Chicago Cardinals	8	4	0	.667	161	56	L1
Duluth Kelleys	4	3	0	.571	35	33	L3
Buffalo All-Americans	5	4	3	.556	94	43	L1
Columbus Tigers	5	4	1	.556	119	35	L1
Toledo Maroons	3	3	2	.500	35	66	L1
Racine Legion	4	4	2	.500	86	76	W1
Rock Island Independents	2	3	3	.400	84	62	L1
Minneapolis Marines	2	5	2	.286	48	81	L1
St. Louis All-Stars	1	4	2	.200	25	74	L1
Hammond Pros	1	5	1	.167	14	59	L4
Akron Pros	1	6	0	.143	25	74	W1
Dayton Triangles	1	6	1	.143	16	95	L2
Oorang Indians	1	10	0	.091	50	257	W1
Louisville Brecks	0	3	0	.000	0	90	L3
Rochester Jeffersons	0	4	0	.000	6	141	L4

Note: Tie games were not officially counted in the standings until 1972.

== Players ==
- Don Batchelor
- Marty Conrad
- Guil Falcon
- Frani FitzGerald
- Joe Gillis
- Harry Hill
- Steamer Horning
- Ben Hunt
- Cliff Jetmore
- Jerry Jones
- Heinie Kirkgard
- Hal Lauer
- Tom McNamara
- Chuck O'Neil
- Si Seyfrit
- Dutch Strauss
- Tillie Voss
- Rat Watson
- Wilbur White
