= 1923 Dayton Triangles season =

National Football League team season

- Owner: Dayton Engineering Laboratories Company
- Head coach: Carl Storck
- Home stadium: Triangle Park

Results
- Record: 1–6–1
- League place: T-16th NFL

The 1923 Dayton Triangles season was their fourth in the league. The team failed to improve on their previous output of 4–3–1, winning only one game. They tied for sixteenth place in the league.

== Schedule ==
Game	Date	Opponent	Result	Record	Venue	Attendance	Recap	Sources
1	September 30	Columbus Tigers	W 7–6	1–0	Triangle Park	6,000	Recap	
2	October 7	at Hammond Pros	L 0–7	1–1	Turner Field		Recap	
3	October 14	at Canton Bulldogs	L 0–30	1–2	Lakeside Park		Recap	
4	October 21	at Toledo Maroons	L 3–6	1–3	Armory Park	3,000	Recap	
5	October 28	at Chicago Cardinals	L 3–13	1–4	Comiskey Park	5,000	Recap	
—	November 4	Toledo Maroons	canceled over Toledo financial demands					
—	November 4	at Steubenville	hastily planned make-up game, canceled					
6	November 11	at Cleveland Indians	T 0–0	1–4–1	Dunn Field	11,000	Recap	
7	November 18	at Buffalo All-Americans	L 0–3	1–5–1	Buffalo Baseball Park	3,500	Recap	
—	November 25	Akron Pros	canceled by Dayton					
8	December 2	at Columbus Tigers	L 3–30	1–6–1	Neil Park		Recap	

== Standings ==
NFL standings
	W	L	T	PCT	PF	PA	STK
Canton Bulldogs	11	0	1	1.000	246	19	W5
Chicago Bears	9	2	1	.818	123	35	W1
Green Bay Packers	7	2	1	.778	85	34	W5
Milwaukee Badgers	7	2	3	.778	100	49	W1
Cleveland Indians	3	1	3	.750	52	49	L1
Chicago Cardinals	8	4	0	.667	161	56	L1
Duluth Kelleys	4	3	0	.571	35	33	L3
Buffalo All-Americans	5	4	3	.556	94	43	L1
Columbus Tigers	5	4	1	.556	119	35	L1
Toledo Maroons	3	3	2	.500	35	66	L1
Racine Legion	4	4	2	.500	86	76	W1
Rock Island Independents	2	3	3	.400	84	62	L1
Minneapolis Marines	2	5	2	.286	48	81	L1
St. Louis All-Stars	1	4	2	.200	25	74	L1
Hammond Pros	1	5	1	.167	14	59	L4
Akron Pros	1	6	0	.143	25	74	W1
Dayton Triangles	1	6	1	.143	16	95	L2
Oorang Indians	1	10	0	.091	50	257	W1
Louisville Brecks	0	3	0	.000	0	90	L3
Rochester Jeffersons	0	4	0	.000	6	141	L4

Note: Tie games were not officially counted in the standings until 1972.

== Roster ==
The following players played at least one NFL game for the 1923 Dayton Triangles. The number of NFL games in which they appeared follows in parentheses.

Linemen

- John Beasley (5)
- Bobby Berns (8) †
- Larry Dellinger (7)
- Harold Fenner (5)
- Lee Fenner (5)
- Russ Hathaway (8) †
- Al Jolley (1) †
- George "Hobby" Kinderdine (8) †
- Dave Reese (8) †
- Eddie Sauer (8) †
- Carl "Dutch" Thiele (8) †
- Glenn Tidd (6)

Backs

- Fay Abbott (8) †
- Frank Bacon (8) †
- Earl "Puss" Burgner (2)
- Ken Crawford (1)
- Ken Huffine (8) †
- Walt Kinderdine (5)
- Lou Partlow (8) †

†- Opening day starter
