= 1923 Frankford Yellow Jackets season =

National Football League team season

- Head coach: Punk Berryman
- Home stadium: Frankford Stadium

Results
- Record: 9–2–2

The 1923 Frankford Yellow Jackets season was their last independent season before joining the National Football League. The team finished the year with 9–2–2 record.

== Schedule ==
Game	Date	Opponent	Result	Record
1	September 29	All-Lancaster	W 24–0	1–0
2	October 6	Bethlehem Thomas A.C.	W 19–0	2–0
3	October 13	New Haven	W 25–0	3–0
4	October 20	Gilberton Catamounts	T 0–0	3–0–1
5	October 27	Shenandoah Yellow Jackets	W 36–7	4–0–1
6	November 3	Coaldale Big Green	W 20–0	5–0–1
7	November 10	Pottsville Maroons	T 0–0	5–0–2
8	November 17	Rochester Jeffersons*	W 33–0	6–0–2
9	November 24	Dayton Triangles*	L 6–7	6–1–2
10	November 29	New York Giants*	W 27–3	7–1–2
11	December 1	Akron Pros*	W 10–0	8–1–2
12	December 8	Buffalo All-Americans*	W 10–6	9–1–2
13	December 15	Canton Bulldogs*	L 0–3	9–2–2
