= 1923 Oorang Indians season =

National Football League team season

- Owner: Walter Lingo
- Head coach: Jim Thorpe
- Home stadium: touring team

Results
- Record: 1–10 NFL (2–10 overall)
- League place: 18th in NFL

The 1923 Oorang Indians season was their second and final season in the National Football League (NFL). The team failed to improve on their previous league record of 3–6, winning only one NFL game. They finished eighteenth in the league.

== Background ==
The team's name, Oorang Indians, is the object of some confusion. The name was adopted due to the sponsorship of the team by Walter Lingo, proprietor of Oorang Kennels of LaRue, Ohio. Lingo was a dog breeder and sportsman, specializing in the perfection of champion Airedale Terriers. Lingo was attracted to the fellowship of some of the leading celebrities of his era, including baseball players Ty Cobb and Tris Speaker, athletic legend Jim Thorpe, boxer Jack Dempsey, and actor Gary Cooper — all of whom he was known to hunt with, together with his dogs.

The team made no effort to make Marion, Ohio into a bastion of fan support for the club, playing every NFL game of the 1923 season on the road. Their one appearance in their hometown proved to be a debacle, a Thanksgiving day exhibition game against the Marion Athletic Club at the county fairgrounds. Only about 100 fans paid a dollar to attend the game, and many of these remained in their automobiles parked alongside the field rather than endure the cold drizzle of the day.

Moreover, with the 36-year old Thorpe suffering a series of nagging injuries, his appearance on the field could no longer be meaningfully promoted. Only bad football remained — the team scored just one touchdown, one field goal, and a safety in its first 9 games combined. Attendance plummeted.

The 1923 season would prove to be the team.

== Schedule ==
Game	Date	Opponent	Result	Record	Venue	Attendance	Recap	Sources
1	September 30	at Milwaukee Badgers	L 2–13	0–1	Athletic Park	4,000	Recap	
2	October 7	at Toledo Maroons	L 0–7	0–2	Armory Park	5,000	Recap	
3	October 14	at Minneapolis Marines	L 0–23	0–3	Nicollet Park	4,000	Recap	
4	October 21	at Buffalo All-Americans	L 0–57	0–4	Buffalo Baseball Park	12,000	Recap	
5	October 28	at Cleveland Indians	L 0–27	0–5	Dunn Field	"modest crowd"	Recap	
6	November 4	at Chicago Bears	L 0–26	0–6	Cubs Park	1,000	Recap	
7	November 11	at St. Louis All-Stars	L 7–14	0–7	Sportsman's Park	5,000	Recap	
8	November 18	at Canton Bulldogs	L 0–41	0–8	Lakeside Park	5,000	Recap	
9	November 25	at Columbus Tigers	L 3–27	0–9	Neil Park		Recap	
–	November 29	vs. Marion Athletic Club	W 31–0	—	Marion County Fairgrounds	100	—	
10	December 2	at Chicago Cardinals	L 19–22	0–10	Comiskey Park	1,200	Recap	
11	December 9	at Louisville Brecks	W 19–0	1–10	Parkway Field	1,200	Recap	
Note: Non-NFL opponent in italics. Thanksgiving Day: November 29.

== Standings ==
NFL standings
	W	L	T	PCT	PF	PA	STK
Canton Bulldogs	11	0	1	1.000	246	19	W5
Chicago Bears	9	2	1	.818	123	35	W1
Green Bay Packers	7	2	1	.778	85	34	W5
Milwaukee Badgers	7	2	3	.778	100	49	W1
Cleveland Indians	3	1	3	.750	52	49	L1
Chicago Cardinals	8	4	0	.667	161	56	L1
Duluth Kelleys	4	3	0	.571	35	33	L3
Buffalo All-Americans	5	4	3	.556	94	43	L1
Columbus Tigers	5	4	1	.556	119	35	L1
Toledo Maroons	3	3	2	.500	35	66	L1
Racine Legion	4	4	2	.500	86	76	W1
Rock Island Independents	2	3	3	.400	84	62	L1
Minneapolis Marines	2	5	2	.286	48	81	L1
St. Louis All-Stars	1	4	2	.200	25	74	L1
Hammond Pros	1	5	1	.167	14	59	L4
Akron Pros	1	6	0	.143	25	74	W1
Dayton Triangles	1	6	1	.143	16	95	L2
Oorang Indians	1	10	0	.091	50	257	W1
Louisville Brecks	0	3	0	.000	0	90	L3
Rochester Jeffersons	0	4	0	.000	6	141	L4

Note: Tie games were not officially counted in the standings until 1972.
