= 1923 Akron Pros season =

National Football League team season

- Head coach: Dutch Hendrian and Wayne Brenkert
- Home stadium: League Park

Results
- Record: 1–6
- Division place: T–16th NFL
- Playoffs: No playoffs until 1932

The 1923 Akron Pros season was their fourth in the National Football League (NFL). The team failed to improve on their previous output of 3–5–2, winning only one game. They tied for sixteenth place in the league.

Ahead of the season it was announced that Akron would field two professional football teams — a "regular club" in the NFL "playing practically all of the games on the road," and a smaller, local club under the direction of head coach Suey Welch that would play a slate of home games at General Tire Field. Former University of Akron star Scotty Bierce was announced as coach of the traveling team.

== Schedule ==
Game	Date	Opponent	Result	Record	Venue	Attendance	Recap	Sources
1	September 30	at Duluth Kelleys	L 7–10	0–1	Duluth Athletic Park	3,000	Recap	
2	October 7	at Buffalo All-Americans	L 0–9	0–2	Buffalo Baseball Park	10,000	Recap	
3	October 14	at Chicago Cardinals	L 0–19	0–3	Normal Park		Recap	
4	October 21	at Racine Legion	L 7–9	0–4	Horlick Field		Recap	
5	October 28	at Canton Bulldogs	L 3–7	0–5	Lakeside Park	2,500	Recap	
—	November 4	Columbus Tigers	canceled due to rain					
6	November 11	at Chicago Bears	L 6–20	0–6	Cubs Park	4,000	Recap	
—	November 18	(open date)						
—	November 25	at Dayton Triangles	canceled by Dayton					
7	November 29	Buffalo All-Americans	W 2–0	1–6	Wooster Avenue Stadium	1,700	Recap	
—	December 9	Racine Legion	canceled					
Note: Thanksgiving Day: November 29.

== Standings ==
NFL standings
	W	L	T	PCT	PF	PA	STK
Canton Bulldogs	11	0	1	1.000	246	19	W5
Chicago Bears	9	2	1	.818	123	35	W1
Green Bay Packers	7	2	1	.778	85	34	W5
Milwaukee Badgers	7	2	3	.778	100	49	W1
Cleveland Indians	3	1	3	.750	52	49	L1
Chicago Cardinals	8	4	0	.667	161	56	L1
Duluth Kelleys	4	3	0	.571	35	33	L3
Buffalo All-Americans	5	4	3	.556	94	43	L1
Columbus Tigers	5	4	1	.556	119	35	L1
Toledo Maroons	3	3	2	.500	35	66	L1
Racine Legion	4	4	2	.500	86	76	W1
Rock Island Independents	2	3	3	.400	84	62	L1
Minneapolis Marines	2	5	2	.286	48	81	L1
St. Louis All-Stars	1	4	2	.200	25	74	L1
Hammond Pros	1	5	1	.167	14	59	L4
Akron Pros	1	6	0	.143	25	74	W1
Dayton Triangles	1	6	1	.143	16	95	L2
Oorang Indians	1	10	0	.091	50	257	W1
Louisville Brecks	0	3	0	.000	0	90	L3
Rochester Jeffersons	0	4	0	.000	6	141	L4

Note: Tie games were not officially counted in the standings until 1972.
