= 1923 Chicago Bears season =

NFL team season

- Owner: George S. Halas, Dutch Sternaman
- Head coach: George Halas
- Home stadium: Cubs Park

Results
- Record: 9–2–1 (NFL) (9–2–2 overall)
- League place: 2nd NFL

The 1923 Chicago Bears season was their fourth regular season completed in the National Football League. The team was able to improve on their 9–3 record from 1922 and finished with a 9–2–1 record under head coach/player George Halas earning them a second-place finish in the team standings earning, the third time in the last four years. As was normal for those days, the Bears played a few games on the road at the beginning of the season and then finished the season with a 9-game homestand.

The Bears started very slow, losing 2 of their first 4 games and scoring only 6 points during those games (their two wins were both won 3–0). After losing 6–0 to eventual champion Canton Bulldogs in week 4, the Bears went undefeated after that. As in 1922, the Sternaman brothers — team co-owner and halfback Dutch and little brother quarterback Joey — starred, combining to score 5 touchdowns, 6 field goals, and 8 PATs. Johnny Bryan emerged as a scoring threat as well, running for 4 scores and passing for another.

Grainy newspaper photo of George Halas, co-owner, coach, and starting right end for the Chicago Bears, 1923. Ends in this era were linemen, who often proved their mettle as stout tacklers on defense.

In week 6's game against the Oorang Indians, George Halas set an NFL record with a 98-yard fumble return — a mark which stood until Jack Tatum broke it with a 104-yard Fumble Return against the Green Bay Packers in 1972.

== Schedule ==
Game	Date	Opponent	Result	Record	Venue	Attendance	Recap	Sources
1	September 30	at Rock Island Independents	L 0–3	0–1	Douglas Park	3,000	Recap	
2	October 7	at Racine Legion	W 3–0	1–1	Horlick Field	5,000	Recap	
3	October 14	at Green Bay Packers	W 3–0	2–1	Bellevue Field	4,451	Recap	
4	October 21	Canton Bulldogs	L 0–6	2–2	Cubs Park		Recap	
5	October 28	Buffalo All-Americans	W 18–3	3–2	Cubs Park		Recap	
6	November 4	Oorang Indians	W 26–0	4–2	Cubs Park	1,000	Recap	
7	November 11	Akron Pros	W 20–6	5–2	Cubs Park	4,000	Recap	
8	November 18	Rock Island Independents	W 7–3	6–2	Cubs Park	6,500	Recap	
9	November 25	Hammond Pros	W 14–7	7–2	Cubs Park	3,500	Recap	
10	November 29	Chicago Cardinals	W 3–0	8–2	Cubs Park	13,500	Recap	
11	December 2	Milwaukee Badgers	T 0–0	8–2–1	Cubs Park	"a big crowd"	Recap	
12	December 9	Rock Island Independents	W 29–7	9–2–1	Cubs Park	6,000	Recap	
—	December 16	Milwaukee Badgers	T 7–7	—	Cubs Park	8,000	—	
Note: Game in italics not recognized as official in league statistics. Thanksgiving Day: November 29.

== Standings ==
Bears co-owner and offensive star Dutch Sternaman misses a field goal in a 6–0 loss to the visiting Canton Bulldogs at Cubs Park on October 21

NFL standings
	W	L	T	PCT	PF	PA	STK
Canton Bulldogs	11	0	1	1.000	246	19	W5
Chicago Bears	9	2	1	.818	123	35	W1
Green Bay Packers	7	2	1	.778	85	34	W5
Milwaukee Badgers	7	2	3	.778	100	49	W1
Cleveland Indians	3	1	3	.750	52	49	L1
Chicago Cardinals	8	4	0	.667	161	56	L1
Duluth Kelleys	4	3	0	.571	35	33	L3
Buffalo All-Americans	5	4	3	.556	94	43	L1
Columbus Tigers	5	4	1	.556	119	35	L1
Toledo Maroons	3	3	2	.500	35	66	L1
Racine Legion	4	4	2	.500	86	76	W1
Rock Island Independents	2	3	3	.400	84	62	L1
Minneapolis Marines	2	5	2	.286	48	81	L1
St. Louis All-Stars	1	4	2	.200	25	74	L1
Hammond Pros	1	5	1	.167	14	59	L4
Akron Pros	1	6	0	.143	25	74	W1
Dayton Triangles	1	6	1	.143	16	95	L2
Oorang Indians	1	10	0	.091	50	257	W1
Louisville Brecks	0	3	0	.000	0	90	L3
Rochester Jeffersons	0	4	0	.000	6	141	L4

Note: Tie games were not officially counted in the standings until 1972.

== Roster ==
=== Future Hall of Fame players ===
- George Halas, end
- Ed Healey
- George Trafton, center

=== Other leading players ===
- Dutch Sternaman, halfback
- Joe Sternaman, quarterback
- Laurie Walquist, quarterback
- Hunk Anderson, guard
- Johnny Bryan, back
