= 1923 Minneapolis Marines season =

National Football League team season

- Head coach: Harry Mehre
- Home stadium: Nicollet Park

Results
- Record: 2–5–2 (NFL) (3–5–2 overall)
- League place: 13th in NFL

The Marines scheduled a November 18 game against the newly professionalized Minneapolis Emersons for bragging rights in the city.

The 1923 Minneapolis Marines season was their third in the league. The team improved on their previous year's record of 1–3 by winning two games, good for 13th place in the 20-team league.

== Schedule ==
Game	Date	Opponent	Result	Record	Venue	Attendance	Recap	Sources
1	September 30	at Green Bay Packers	L 0–12	0–1	Bellevue Park	3,008	Recap	
2	October 7	Duluth Kelleys	L 0–10	0–2	Nicollet Park	2,500	Recap	
3	October 14	Oorang Indians	W 23–0	1–2	Nicollet Park	4,000	Recap	
4	October 21	at Chicago Cardinals	L 0–9	1–3	Comiskey Park	4,000	Recap	
5	October 28	at Duluth Kelleys	L 0–9	1–4	Duluth Athletic Park	3,000	Recap	
6	November 4	Racine Legion	W 13–6	2–4	Nicollet Park	1,200	Recap	
7	November 11	Rock Island Independents	T 6–6	2–4–1	Nicollet Park	3,000	Recap	
—	November 18	Minneapolis Emersons	W 7–2	—	Nicollet Park		—	
8	November 25	at Rock Island Independents	T 6–6	2–4–2	Douglas Park	1,800	Recap	
9	December 2	at Racine Legion	L 0–23	2–5–2	Horlick Field		Recap	
Note: Game in italics was a non-NFL opponent.

== Standings ==
NFL standings
	W	L	T	PCT	PF	PA	STK
Canton Bulldogs	11	0	1	1.000	246	19	W5
Chicago Bears	9	2	1	.818	123	35	W1
Green Bay Packers	7	2	1	.778	85	34	W5
Milwaukee Badgers	7	2	3	.778	100	49	W1
Cleveland Indians	3	1	3	.750	52	49	L1
Chicago Cardinals	8	4	0	.667	161	56	L1
Duluth Kelleys	4	3	0	.571	35	33	L3
Buffalo All-Americans	5	4	3	.556	94	43	L1
Columbus Tigers	5	4	1	.556	119	35	L1
Toledo Maroons	3	3	2	.500	35	66	L1
Racine Legion	4	4	2	.500	86	76	W1
Rock Island Independents	2	3	3	.400	84	62	L1
Minneapolis Marines	2	5	2	.286	48	81	L1
St. Louis All-Stars	1	4	2	.200	25	74	L1
Hammond Pros	1	5	1	.167	14	59	L4
Akron Pros	1	6	0	.143	25	74	W1
Dayton Triangles	1	6	1	.143	16	95	L2
Oorang Indians	1	10	0	.091	50	257	W1
Louisville Brecks	0	3	0	.000	0	90	L3
Rochester Jeffersons	0	4	0	.000	6	141	L4

Note: Tie games were not officially counted in the standings until 1972.
