= 1923 St. Louis All-Stars season =

National Football League team season

- Owner: Ollie Kraehe
- Head coach: Ollie Kraehe
- Home stadium: Sportsman's Park

Results
- Record: 1–4–2 in NFL (2–5–2 overall)
- League place: 14th in NFL

The 1923 St. Louis All-Stars season was the franchise's sole season in the National Football League. The team finished 1–4–2 in league play, and a 2–5–2 overall record finishing fourteenth in the standings.

Alone in the NFL, the All-Stars would not play home games against black opponents in Missouri, forcing the sidelining of Fritz Pollard and end Ink Williams of the Hammond Pros. St. Louis made the best of this competitive disadvantage forced upon its opponent, generating a scoreless tie in this contest with an ostensibly superior opponent.

The team drew crowds of fewer than 1,000 people to two of their four home dates, with team owner Ollie Kraehe losing thousands of dollars on guarantees paid to visiting teams. The Blues did not return to the NFL for the 1924 season.

== Schedule ==
Game	Date	Opponent	Result	Record	Venue	Attendance	Recap	Sources
–	September 30	at Murphysboro All-Stars	W 25–0	—	Murphysboro, Illinois	(promoter lost money)	—	
1	October 7	at Green Bay Packers	T 0–0	0–0–1	Bellevue Park	2,831	Recap	
2	October 14	Hammond Pros	T 0–0	0–0–2	Sportsman's Park	719	Recap	
3	October 21	at Cleveland Indians	L 0–6	0–1–2	Dunn Field	7,000	Recap	
4	October 28	at Milwaukee Badgers	L 0–6	0–2–2	Athletic Park	4,700	Recap	
5	November 4	Green Bay Packers	L 0–3	0–3–2	Sportsman's Park	750	Recap	
6	November 11	Oorang Indians	W 14–7	1–3–2	Sportsman's Park	5,000	Recap	
—	November 18	at Hammond Pros	canceled					
7	November 24	Milwaukee Badgers	L 0–17	1–4–2	Sportsman's Park	2,395	Recap	
–	December 2	at Benld Independents	L 7–9	—	Benld, Illinois		—	
Note: Games in italics are against non-NFL teams. November 24: Saturday.

== Standings ==
NFL standings
	W	L	T	PCT	PF	PA	STK
Canton Bulldogs	11	0	1	1.000	246	19	W5
Chicago Bears	9	2	1	.818	123	35	W1
Green Bay Packers	7	2	1	.778	85	34	W5
Milwaukee Badgers	7	2	3	.778	100	49	W1
Cleveland Indians	3	1	3	.750	52	49	L1
Chicago Cardinals	8	4	0	.667	161	56	L1
Duluth Kelleys	4	3	0	.571	35	33	L3
Buffalo All-Americans	5	4	3	.556	94	43	L1
Columbus Tigers	5	4	1	.556	119	35	L1
Toledo Maroons	3	3	2	.500	35	66	L1
Racine Legion	4	4	2	.500	86	76	W1
Rock Island Independents	2	3	3	.400	84	62	L1
Minneapolis Marines	2	5	2	.286	48	81	L1
St. Louis All-Stars	1	4	2	.200	14	39	L1
Hammond Pros	1	5	1	.167	14	59	L4
Akron Pros	1	6	0	.143	25	74	W1
Dayton Triangles	1	6	1	.143	16	95	L2
Oorang Indians	1	10	0	.091	50	257	W1
Louisville Brecks	0	3	0	.000	0	90	L3
Rochester Jeffersons	0	4	0	.000	6	141	L4

Note: Tie games were not officially counted in the standings until 1972.

== Roster ==
- LeRoy Andrews
- John Cardwell
- Pete Casey
- James Finnegan
- Dolly Gray impostor
- Dick King
- Ollie Kraehe
- Walt Kreinheder
- Ward Meese
- George Meinhardt
- Johnny Milton
- William Murrah
- Orville Siegfried
- Eber Simpson
- Brick Travis
- Bub Weller
- Hal Wilder
- Ernie Winburn
- Lee Wykoff
