= 1923 NFL season =

American football season

Regular season
- Duration: September 30 – December 16, 1923
- Champions: Canton Bulldogs

NFL teams

The 1923 NFL season was the fourth regular season of the National Football League (NFL). It was the second year after the name of the league was changed from the original "American Professional Football Association."

For the first time, all of the clubs that were considered to be part of the NFL fielded teams. The new clubs that entered the league included the Duluth Kelleys, the St. Louis All Stars (which only lasted one season), and a new Cleveland Indians team, while the Evansville Crimson Giants dropped out of the league and folded.

The Canton Bulldogs repeated as NFL Champions after ending the season with an 11–0–1 record. No championship game took place; rather the title was decided based upon winning percentage for games played with other National League teams.

== Background ==
=== Growth and trials ===
By 1923, the fourth season of existence of the National Football League (NFL), organizational efficiency and athletic professionalism had begun to supplant the ad hoc, semi-pro nature of the league's first years. In December 1923, the sports editors of 13 football cities could truthfully write:

"Professional football made rapid strides during the season just completed and the post-graduate game climbed rapidly in public favor.... Pro football of today is different than in the olden days.... The majority of elevens make use of 'all-time' footballers. The day of stars getting in several hours before a game and running through signals in a hotel corridor is past. With but few exceptions, all of the clubs in the pro wheel engaged in daily practices to build up machine-like play."

With no revenue streams from merchandise or radio and without television, all team revenue flowed through the gate — and the gate still did not cover most expenses. Even teams in the biggest cities such as the Bears and the Cardinals of Chicago — appeared to struggle to make ends meet. For small-market teams, the situation was said to be worse.

In Wisconsin, losses incurred by the teams in Green Bay and Racine forced the selling $5 stock or soliciting $10 donations (respectively) in a frantic effort to maintain solvency for the forthcoming 1924 season. In Ohio, teams in Akron, Columbus, and Toledo piled up losses in the first half of the 1923 campaign and ominous game cancellations in the back end. Jim Thorpe's Oorang Indians, with their all-Native American roster, would provide a short-lived novelty as a touring circus at the gate but would deliver a painfully poor product on the field. They found themselves on Thanksgiving day playing an exhibition game in the rain with the Athletic Club of Marion, Ohio at a county fairgrounds in front of a crowd of 100 people, some of whom remained shuttered in their cars parked along the sidelines.

No team, execept for the Chicago Bears, was profitable and many franchises were doomed, yet the National Football League managed to survive.

=== League meeting ===
The NFL's annual scheduling meeting — always the most important conclave of team owners and representatives — was held in Chicago on January 20 and 21, 1923. There were representatives of 17 teams in attendance, as well as petitioners for new franchises from Cleveland, St. Louis, Davenport, St. Paul, and Duluth. The gathering re-elected Joe F. Carr of Columbus as league president and named John A. Dunn of Minneapolis vice-president, with Carl Storck of Dayton tapped as secretary-treasurer.

Making the appearance in an effort to a franchise for Davenport, Iowa was Jack Collins of Rock Island, former right-hand man of Independents owner Walter Flanigan. While league rules assigned territorial rights prohibiting two franchises within a five mile radius, Rock Island was not expected to oppose establishment of a rival on the other side of the Mississippi, other league owners did not feel that the Iowa city passed muster, and the request for a franchise was denied.

The January meeting also established a league salary limit of $1,200 per game — about $75 per player on average — and limited the team roster size to 16 players. League owners also decided to assign official team colors for each franchise to avoid on-field confusion caused by similarity of uniform schemes.

== Teams ==
Twenty teams competed in the NFL during the 1923 season.

First season in NFL	First and only season in NFL	Team folded this season
Last season before hiatus, rejoined NFL in 1925

Team	Head coach(es)	Stadium(s)
Akron Pros	Dutch Hendrian (5 games); Wayne Brenkert (2 games)	Akron League Park
Buffalo All-Americans	Tommy Hughitt	Buffalo Baseball Park (5 games); Canisius Villa (1 game)
Canton Bulldogs	Guy Chamberlin	League Field
Chicago Bears	George Halas	Cubs Park
Chicago Cardinals	Arnie Horween	Comiskey Park
Cleveland Indians	Cap Edwards	Dunn Field
Columbus Tigers	Gus Tebell (3 games); Gaylord Stinchcomb (7 games)	Neil Park
Dayton Triangles	Carl Storck	Triangle Park
Duluth Kelleys	Joey Sternaman	Duluth Athletic Park
Green Bay Packers	Curly Lambeau	Bellevue Park
Hammond Pros	Wally Hess	Turner Field
Louisville Brecks	Jim Kendrick	Parkway Field
Milwaukee Badgers	Jimmy Conzelman	Milwaukee Athletic Park
Minneapolis Marines	Harry Mehre	Nicollet Park
Oorang Indians	Jim Thorpe	Traveling team
Racine Legion	Babe Ruetz	Horlick Field
Rochester Jeffersons	Leo Lyons	Edgerton Park
Rock Island Independents	Herb Sies	Douglas Park
St. Louis All-Stars	Ollie Kraehe	Sportsman's Park
Toledo Maroons	Guil Falcon	Armory Park

== Standings ==
NFL standings
	W	L	T	PCT	PF	PA	STK
Canton Bulldogs	11	0	1	1.000	246	19	W5
Chicago Bears	9	2	1	.818	123	35	W1
Green Bay Packers	7	2	1	.778	85	34	W5
Milwaukee Badgers	7	2	3	.778	100	49	W1
Cleveland Indians	3	1	3	.750	52	49	L1
Chicago Cardinals	8	4	0	.667	161	56	L1
Duluth Kelleys	4	3	0	.571	35	33	L3
Buffalo All-Americans	5	4	3	.556	94	43	L1
Columbus Tigers	5	4	1	.556	119	35	L1
Toledo Maroons	3	3	2	.500	35	66	L1
Racine Legion	4	4	2	.500	86	76	W1
Rock Island Independents	2	3	3	.400	84	62	L1
Minneapolis Marines	2	5	2	.286	48	81	L1
St. Louis All-Stars	1	4	2	.200	25	74	L1
Hammond Pros	1	5	1	.167	14	59	L4
Akron Pros	1	6	0	.143	25	74	W1
Dayton Triangles	1	6	1	.143	16	95	L2
Oorang Indians	1	10	0	.091	50	257	W1
Louisville Brecks	0	3	0	.000	0	90	L3
Rochester Jeffersons	0	4	0	.000	6	141	L4

Note: Tie games were not officially counted in the standings until 1972.

== Championship ==
With an unbeated record of 10 wins and 1 tie, the Canton Bulldogs were named the World Champions of Professional Football for 1923 by the league's owners. Despite the accolade, the year proved a financial disaster even for the league's best team, with the franchise losing $10,000 (the equivalent of about $185,000 in 2025 funds) for the year. The franchise was sold and moved to Cleveland for the 1924 NFL season.

== Postseason play ==
Six days after the December 9 end of the NFL season, league champion Canton accepted a challenge to play against the Frankford Yellow Jackets of Philadelphia, who were not an NFL team but who had billed themselves as "champions of the East" with a 9-1-2 record against teams in the "Anthracite League" and against four other NFL teams. Canton won the game in Philadelphia in the final two minutes of play on a field goal from future Hall of Famer Pete Henry.

== All-American Professional Football Team ==
In mid-December 1923, with the season recently completed, a group of 15 sportswriters from NFL cities picked first, second, and third squads for an "All-American Professional Football Team." Participating writers came from papers in Akron, Canton, Cleveland, Columbus, Dayton, Duluth, Green Bay, Milwaukee, Minneapolis, Pittsburgh (2), Racine (2), Rock Island, and St. Louis. No writer from Chicago, a city with two NFL franchises, participated.

This was the first time that what would eventually be known as an "All-Pro" team was systematically chosen from among the ranks of the NFL's players.

During this first era of integrated play, two African-American players were named to the 1923 team — end Jay "Ink" Williams of the Hammond Pros and tackle Fred "Duke" Slater of the Rock Island Independents. The complete list of those tapped for this All-Pro team included:

—	First Team		Second Team		Third Team	
Position	Name	Team	Name	Team	Name	Team
E	Ink Williams	Hammond	Guy Chamberlin	Canton	Ben Winkelman	Milwaukee
T	Ed Healey	Bears	Russ Hathaway	Dayton	Cub Buck	Green Bay
G	Bub Weller	St. Louis	Frank Morrissey	Buffalo	Tom McNamara	Toledo
C	Harry Mehre	Minneapolis	Larry Conover	Canton	Charlie Guy	Cleveland
G	Swede Youngstrom	Buffalo	Hec Garvey	Bears	Al Nesser	Akron
T	Pete Henry	Canton	Duke Slater	Rock Island	Tillie Voss	Toledo
E	Gus Tebell	Columbus	Duke Hanny	Bears	Dick O'Donnell	Duluth
QB	Paddy Driscoll	Cardinals	Jimmy Conzelman	Milwaukee	Johnny Armstrong	Rock Island
HB	Jim Thorpe	Indians	Harry Robb	Canton	Milt Romney	Racine
HB	Al Michaels	Akron	Curly Lambeau	Green Bay	Hal Erickson	Milwaukee
FB	Doc Elliott	Canton	Dinger Doane	Milwaukee	Johnny Kyle	Cleveland
