= 1923 Hammond Pros season =

National Football League team season

- Head coach: Wally Hess
- Home stadium: Turner Field

Results
- Record: 1–5–1
- League place: 15th NFL

The 1923 Hammond Pros season was their fourth in the National Football League (NFL). The Hammond, Indiana team followed their winless 1922 season with another debacle, winning just one game — leaving them in 15th place in the 20-team league.

Three of their four scheduled home games were canceled, only one of which was weather-related.

== Schedule ==
The Pros' second game of the season was the only one they ever played in their home city of Hammond. For four years the club had been unable to play a true home game due to lack of a suitable venue. A local banker, A. Murray Turner, constructed a workable athletic ground, Turner Field. The stadium, with a capacity of only a few thousand, would be the site of Hammond's only win in 1923 — a 7–0 victory over the visiting Dayton Triangles.

The game's only score came in the fourth quarter when left end "Ink" Williams scooped up a fumble at the Dayton 25-yard-line and returned it for a touchdown. Future Pro Football Hall of Famer Fritz Pollard kicked the extra point to finish the day's scoring. Three additional games scheduled for Hammond would be canceled — one due to torrential rain and two for financial reasons, owing to poor fan support for a poorly performing team.

The October 7, 1923, game with the Triangles would also be the last regular-season NFL game played in Indiana for over 60 years, until the Indianapolis Colts arrived from Baltimore in 1984.

The Pros would have a fine opportunity to put together back-to-back wins the following week, during a trip to Missouri to play the short-lived St. Louis All-Stars, but Hammond's two black stars — Fritz Pollard and "Ink" Williams — would not be permitted to take the field. Playing in the rain in front of a pathetic crowd of 719 fans, the teams mucked out a 0–0 tie, in which the punting battle between Hammond's Wally Hess and Pete Casey of St. Louis was the main attraction.

Game	Date	Opponent	Result	Record	Venue	Attendance	Recap	Sources
1	September 30	at Canton Bulldogs	L 0–17	0–1	Lakeside Park	5,000	Recap	
2	October 7	Dayton Triangles	W 7–0	1–1	Turner Field		Recap	
3	October 14	at St. Louis All-Stars	T 0–0	1–1–1	Sportsman's Park	719	Recap	
4	October 21	at Duluth Kelleys	L 0–3	1–2–1	Duluth Athletic Park	4,000	Recap	
—	October 28	Rochester Jeffersons	canceled due to expected bad attendance					
—	November 4	Toledo Maroons	canceled due to rain					
5	November 11	at Chicago Cardinals	L 0–6	1–3–1	Comiskey Park	3,500	Recap	
—	November 18	St. Louis All-Stars	canceled					
6	November 25	at Chicago Bears	L 7–14	1–4–1	Cubs Park	3,500	Recap	
7	November 29	at Green Bay Packers	L 0–19	1–5–1	Bellevue Park	2,000	Recap	
Note: Games in italics indicate a non-NFL opponent. Thanksgiving Day: November 29.

== Standings ==
NFL standings
	W	L	T	PCT	PF	PA	STK
Canton Bulldogs	11	0	1	1.000	246	19	W5
Chicago Bears	9	2	1	.818	123	35	W1
Green Bay Packers	7	2	1	.778	85	34	W5
Milwaukee Badgers	7	2	3	.778	100	49	W1
Cleveland Indians	3	1	3	.750	52	49	L1
Chicago Cardinals	8	4	0	.667	161	56	L1
Duluth Kelleys	4	3	0	.571	35	33	L3
Buffalo All-Americans	5	4	3	.556	94	43	L1
Columbus Tigers	5	4	1	.556	119	35	L1
Toledo Maroons	3	3	2	.500	35	66	L1
Racine Legion	4	4	2	.500	86	76	W1
Rock Island Independents	2	3	3	.400	84	62	L1
Minneapolis Marines	2	5	2	.286	48	81	L1
St. Louis All-Stars	1	4	2	.200	25	74	L1
Hammond Pros	1	5	1	.167	14	59	L4
Akron Pros	1	6	0	.143	25	74	W1
Dayton Triangles	1	6	1	.143	16	95	L2
Oorang Indians	1	10	0	.091	50	257	W1
Louisville Brecks	0	3	0	.000	0	90	L3
Rochester Jeffersons	0	4	0	.000	6	141	L4

Note: Tie games were not officially counted in the standings until 1972.
