= 1923 Rock Island Independents season =

National Football League team season

- President: Chester Thompson
- Head coach: Herb Sies
- Home stadium: Douglas Park

Results
- Record: 2–3–3 NFL (5–3–3 overall)
- League place: 12th in NFL

The 1923 Rock Island Independents season was their fourth in the National Football League (NFL). The team failed to improve on their previous output of 4–2–1, winning only two games. They finished twelfth in the league.

== Schedule ==
Game	Date	Opponent	Result	Record	Venue	Attendance	Recap	Sources
1	September 30	Chicago Bears	W 3–0	1–0	Douglas Park	3,000+	Recap	
2	October 7	Cleveland Indians	T 0–0	1–0–1	Douglas Park	3,500	Recap	
3	October 14	Rochester Jeffersons	W 56–0	2–0–1	Douglas Park	2,500	Recap	
—	October 21	Hibbing Miners	W 27–7	—	Douglas Park	~ 3,000	—	
—	October 28	at Omaha Olympics	W 22–6	—	Douglas Park	4,500	—	
4	November 4	Milwaukee Badgers	L 3–14	2–1–1	Douglas Park	2,500	Recap	
5	November 11	at Minneapolis Marines	T 6–6	2–1–2	Nicollet Park	3,000	Recap	
6	November 18	at Chicago Bears	L 3–7	2–2–2	Cubs Park	6,500	Recap	
7	November 25	Minneapolis Marines	T 6–6	2–2–3	Douglas Park	1,800	Recap	
—	December 2	at Lansing Durant Stars	W 7–6	—	League Park	2,000+	—	
8	December 9	at Chicago Bears	L 7–29	2–3–3	Cubs Park	6,000	Recap	
Note: Non-NFL opponents in italics.

== Standings ==
NFL standings
	W	L	T	PCT	PF	PA	STK
Canton Bulldogs	11	0	1	1.000	246	19	W5
Chicago Bears	9	2	1	.818	123	35	W1
Green Bay Packers	7	2	1	.778	85	34	W5
Milwaukee Badgers	7	2	3	.778	100	49	W1
Cleveland Indians	3	1	3	.750	52	49	L1
Chicago Cardinals	8	4	0	.667	161	56	L1
Duluth Kelleys	4	3	0	.571	35	33	L3
Buffalo All-Americans	5	4	3	.556	94	43	L1
Columbus Tigers	5	4	1	.556	119	35	L1
Toledo Maroons	3	3	2	.500	35	66	L1
Racine Legion	4	4	2	.500	86	76	W1
Rock Island Independents	2	3	3	.400	84	62	L1
Minneapolis Marines	2	5	2	.286	48	81	L1
St. Louis All-Stars	1	4	2	.200	25	74	L1
Hammond Pros	1	5	1	.167	14	59	L4
Akron Pros	1	6	0	.143	25	74	W1
Dayton Triangles	1	6	1	.143	16	95	L2
Oorang Indians	1	10	0	.091	50	257	W1
Louisville Brecks	0	3	0	.000	0	90	L3
Rochester Jeffersons	0	4	0	.000	6	141	L4

Note: Tie games were not officially counted in the standings until 1972.

== Roster ==
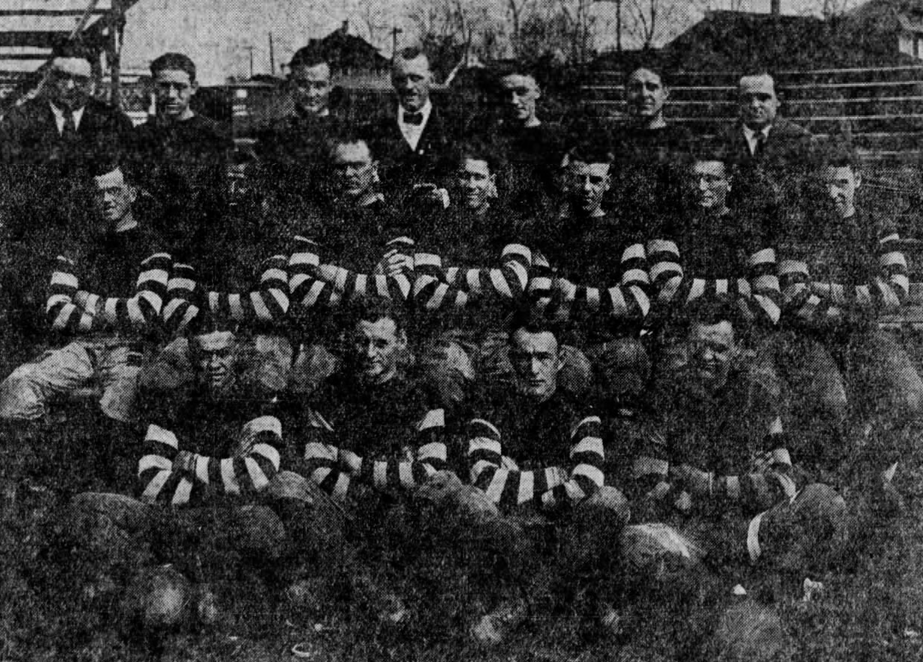
1923 Rock Island Independents team photo (left to right): top row – Chester Thompson (president of the Rock Island Football Association), Alex Gorgal, Bulger Lowe, Jack Paridon (trainer), Charlie Lungren, Frank DeClerk, J. J. Rimmerman (managing secretary); middle row – Mike Wilson, Duke Slater, Herb Sies (captain / head coach), Lou Kolls, Hank Smith, Joe Burten, Max Kadesky; bottom row – Waddy Kuehl, Bob Phelan, Johnny Armstrong, Bill Giaver. (Note: Fod Cotton and George Thompson not pictured.)
