= 1923 Milwaukee Badgers season =

National Football League team season

- Head coach: Jimmy Conzelman
- Home stadium: Milwaukee; Athletic Park

Results
- Record: 7–2–3 NFL (8–2–4 overall)
- League place: T–3rd in NFL

The 1923 Milwaukee Badgers season was their second in the National Football League. The team improved on their previous league record of 2–4–3, winning 7 games. They tied for third place in the league.

== Schedule ==
Game	Date	Opponent	Result	Record	Venue	Attendance	Recap	Sources
1	September 30	Oorang Indians	W 13–2	1–0	Athletic Park	4,000	Recap	
2	October 7	Columbus Tigers	T 0–0	1–0–1	Athletic Park	2,000	Recap	
3	October 14	Racine Legion	T 7–7	1–0–2	Athletic Park	4,000	Recap	
4	October 21	at Green Bay Packers	L 0–12	1–1–2	Bellevue Field	5,000	Recap	
5	October 28	St. Louis All-Stars	W 6–0	2–1–2	Athletic Park	4,700	Recap	
6	November 4	at Rock Island Independents	W 14–3	3–1–2	Douglas Park	2,500	Recap	
7	November 11	Duluth Kelleys	W 6–3	4–1–2	Athletic Park	5,000	Recap	
8	November 18	Green Bay Packers	L 7–10	4–2–2	Athletic Park	5,400	Recap	
9	November 24	at St. Louis All-Stars	W 17–0	5–2–2	Sportsman's Park	2,395	Recap	
10	November 29	at Racine Legion	W 16–0	6–2–2	Horlick Field		Recap	
11	December 2	at Chicago Bears	T 0–0	6–2–3	Cubs Park	"a big crowd"	Recap	
–	December 8	Milwaukee Lapham A.C.	W 10–0	—	Athletic Park		—	
12	December 9	at Chicago Cardinals	W 14–12	7–2–3	Comiskey Park	6,000	Recap	
–	December 16	at Chicago Bears	T 7–7	—	Cubs Park	7,500	—	
Note: Game in italics not recognized as official in league statistics. Thanksgiving Day: November 29.

== Standings ==
NFL standings
	W	L	T	PCT	PF	PA	STK
Canton Bulldogs	11	0	1	1.000	246	19	W5
Chicago Bears	9	2	1	.818	123	35	W1
Green Bay Packers	7	2	1	.778	85	34	W5
Milwaukee Badgers	7	2	3	.778	100	49	W1
Cleveland Indians	3	1	3	.750	52	49	L1
Chicago Cardinals	8	4	0	.667	161	56	L1
Duluth Kelleys	4	3	0	.571	35	33	L3
Buffalo All-Americans	5	4	3	.556	94	43	L1
Columbus Tigers	5	4	1	.556	119	35	L1
Toledo Maroons	3	3	2	.500	35	66	L1
Racine Legion	4	4	2	.500	86	76	W1
Rock Island Independents	2	3	3	.400	84	62	L1
Minneapolis Marines	2	5	2	.286	48	81	L1
St. Louis All-Stars	1	4	2	.200	14	39	L1
Hammond Pros	1	5	1	.167	14	59	L4
Akron Pros	1	6	0	.143	25	74	W1
Dayton Triangles	1	6	1	.143	16	95	L2
Oorang Indians	1	10	0	.091	50	257	W1
Louisville Brecks	0	3	0	.000	0	90	L3
Rochester Jeffersons	0	4	0	.000	6	141	L4

Note: Tie games were not officially counted in the standings until 1972.
