= 1923 Canton Bulldogs season =

National Football League team season

- Head coach: Guy Chamberlin
- Home stadium: Lakeside Park

Results
- Record: 11–0–1
- League place: 1st NFL

The 1923 Canton Bulldogs season was their fourth in the National Football League (NFL). The team continued to build upon their undefeated 10 win season of 1922 by winning eleven games, with one tie. With the best record in the league, for the second straight year they were crowned the NFL Champions.

== Schedule ==
Game	Date	Opponent	Result	Record	Venue	Attendance	Recap	Sources
1	September 30	Hammond Pros	W 17–0	1–0	Lakeside Park	5,000	Recap	
2	October 7	Louisville Brecks	W 37–0	2–0	Lakeside Park		Recap	
3	October 14	Dayton Triangles	W 30–0	3–0	Lakeside Park		Recap	
4	October 21	at Chicago Bears	W 6–0	4–0	Cubs Park		Recap	
5	October 28	Akron Pros	W 7–3	5–0	Lakeside Park	2,500	Recap	
6	November 4	at Chicago Cardinals	W 7–3	6–0	Comiskey Park	5,500	Recap	
7	November 11	at Buffalo All-Americans	T 3–3	6–0–1	Buffalo Baseball Park	10,000	Recap	
8	November 18	Oorang Indians	W 41–0	7–0–1	Lakeside Park	5,000	Recap	
9	November 25	at Cleveland Indians	W 46–10	8–0–1	Dunn Field	17,000	Recap	
10	November 29	Toledo Maroons	W 28–0	9–0–1	Lakeside Park	3,000	Recap	
11	December 2	Buffalo All-Americans	W 14–0	10–0–1	Lakeside Park	4,000	Recap	
12	December 9	at Columbus Tigers	W 10–0	11–0–1	Neil Park	1,700	Recap	
Note: Armistice Day: November 11. Thanksgiving Day: November 29.

== Standings ==
NFL standings
	W	L	T	PCT	PF	PA	STK
Canton Bulldogs	11	0	1	1.000	246	19	W5
Chicago Bears	9	2	1	.818	123	35	W1
Green Bay Packers	7	2	1	.778	85	34	W5
Milwaukee Badgers	7	2	3	.778	100	49	W1
Cleveland Indians	3	1	3	.750	52	49	L1
Chicago Cardinals	8	4	0	.667	161	56	L1
Duluth Kelleys	4	3	0	.571	35	33	L3
Buffalo All-Americans	5	4	3	.556	94	43	L1
Columbus Tigers	5	4	1	.556	119	35	L1
Toledo Maroons	3	3	2	.500	35	66	L1
Racine Legion	4	4	2	.500	86	76	W1
Rock Island Independents	2	3	3	.400	84	62	L1
Minneapolis Marines	2	5	2	.286	48	81	L1
St. Louis All-Stars	1	4	2	.200	14	39	L1
Hammond Pros	1	5	1	.167	14	59	L4
Akron Pros	1	6	0	.143	25	74	W1
Dayton Triangles	1	6	1	.143	16	95	L2
Oorang Indians	1	10	0	.091	50	257	W1
Louisville Brecks	0	3	0	.000	0	90	L3
Rochester Jeffersons	0	4	0	.000	6	141	L4

Note: Tie games were not officially counted in the standings until 1972.
