= 1923 Cleveland Indians (NFL) season =

National Football League team season

1923 Cleveland Indians season
- Owner: Sam H. Deutsch
- Head coach: Cap Edwards
- Home stadium: Dunn Field

Results
- Record: 3–1–3
- League place: 5th NFL

The 1923 Cleveland Indians season was their first in the National Football League (NFL). The team finished with a record of 3–1–3, fifth in the league by winning percentage.

The team also canceled one home game with the Toledo Maroons due to poor attendance, with just 400 fans paying admission. Team owner Sam H. Deutsch declaring that if he had allowed the two squads to take the field, he would have lost $7,500 due to salaries, guarantees to the visiting team, park rental fees, and other incidentals. Cleveland was not forced to absorb a forfeit for their failure to play, despite the fact that both teams were present and ready to take the field. Deutsch asserted that he still lost $2,500 on the day despite having stopped the contest.

== Schedule ==
Game	Date	Opponent	Result	Record	Venue	Attendance	Recap	Sources
1	October 7	at Rock Island Independents	T 0–0	0–0–1	Douglas Park	3,500	Recap	
—	October 14	Toledo Maroons	canceled by Cleveland owner to avert financial loss					
2	October 21	St. Louis All-Stars	W 6–0	1–0–1	Dunn Field	7,000	Recap	
3	October 28	Oorang Indians	W 27–0	2–0–1	Dunn Field	"modest crowd"	Recap	
4	November 4	at Buffalo All-Americans	T 0–0	2–0–2	Buffalo Baseball Park	3,000	Recap	
5	November 11	Dayton Triangles	T 0–0	2–0–3	Dunn Field	11,000	Recap	
6	November 18	Columbus Tigers	W 9–3	3–0–3	Dunn Field	6,000	Recap	
7	November 25	Canton Bulldogs	L 10–46	3–1–3	Dunn Field	17,000	Recap	

== Standings ==
NFL standings
	W	L	T	PCT	PF	PA	STK
Canton Bulldogs	11	0	1	1.000	246	19	W5
Chicago Bears	9	2	1	.818	123	35	W1
Green Bay Packers	7	2	1	.778	85	34	W5
Milwaukee Badgers	7	2	3	.778	100	49	W1
Cleveland Indians	3	1	3	.750	52	49	L1
Chicago Cardinals	8	4	0	.667	161	56	L1
Duluth Kelleys	4	3	0	.571	35	33	L3
Buffalo All-Americans	5	4	3	.556	94	43	L1
Columbus Tigers	5	4	1	.556	119	35	L1
Toledo Maroons	3	3	2	.500	35	66	L1
Racine Legion	4	4	2	.500	86	76	W1
Rock Island Independents	2	3	3	.400	84	62	L1
Minneapolis Marines	2	5	2	.286	48	81	L1
St. Louis All-Stars	1	4	2	.200	25	74	L1
Hammond Pros	1	5	1	.167	14	59	L4
Akron Pros	1	6	0	.143	25	74	W1
Dayton Triangles	1	6	1	.143	16	95	L2
Oorang Indians	1	10	0	.091	50	257	W1
Louisville Brecks	0	3	0	.000	0	90	L3
Rochester Jeffersons	0	4	0	.000	6	141	L4

Note: Tie games were not officially counted in the standings until 1972.
