= 1923 Green Bay Packers season =

NFL team season

- Head coach: Curly Lambeau
- Home stadium: Bellevue Park

Results
- Record: 7–2–1 NFL (8–2–1 overall)
- League place: 3rd NFL

The 1923 Green Bay Packers season was their fifth season overall and their third season in the National Football League (NFL). The team finished with a 7–2–1 record under player/coach Curly Lambeau earning them third place. This was the Packers' first season in Bellevue Park.

The NFL season opener on September 30, bringing the Minneapolis Marines to town for their NFL debut, drew a paid attendance of 3,008 — said to be "the largest crowd that ever witnessed a football game in Green Bay." That figure would be exceeded twice more during the year.

== Schedule ==
Game	Date	Opponent	Result	Record	Venue	Attendance	Recap	Sources
—	September 23	Hibbing Miners	W 10–0	—	Bellevue Park	2,670	—	
1	September 30	Minneapolis Marines	W 12–0	1–0	Bellevue Park	3,008	Recap	
2	October 7	St. Louis All-Stars	T 0–0	1–0–1	Bellevue Park	2,831	Recap	
3	October 14	Chicago Bears	L 0–3	1–1–1	Bellevue Park	4,451	Recap	
4	October 21	Milwaukee Badgers	W 12–0	2–1–1	Bellevue Park	5,000	Recap	
5	October 28	Racine Legion	L 3–24	2–2–1	Bellevue Park	2,800	Recap	
6	November 4	at St. Louis All-Stars	W 3–0	3–2–1	Sportsman's Park	750	Recap	
7	November 11	at Racine Legion	W 16–0	4–2–1	Horlick Field	3,500	Recap	
8	November 18	at Milwaukee Badgers	W 10–7	5–2–1	Athletic Park	5,400	Recap	
9	November 25	Duluth Kelleys	W 10–0	6–2–1	Bellevue Park	3,000	Recap	
10	November 29	Hammond Pros	W 19–0	7–2–1	Bellevue Park	2,000	Recap	
Note: Games in italics indicate a non-NFL opponent. Thanksgiving Day: November 29.

== Standings ==
NFL standings
	W	L	T	PCT	PF	PA	STK
Canton Bulldogs	11	0	1	1.000	246	19	W5
Chicago Bears	9	2	1	.818	123	35	W1
Green Bay Packers	7	2	1	.778	85	34	W5
Milwaukee Badgers	7	2	3	.778	100	49	W1
Cleveland Indians	3	1	3	.750	52	49	L1
Chicago Cardinals	8	4	0	.667	161	56	L1
Duluth Kelleys	4	3	0	.571	35	33	L3
Buffalo All-Americans	5	4	3	.556	94	43	L1
Columbus Tigers	5	4	1	.556	119	35	L1
Toledo Maroons	3	3	2	.500	35	66	L1
Racine Legion	4	4	2	.500	86	76	W1
Rock Island Independents	2	3	3	.400	84	62	L1
Minneapolis Marines	2	5	2	.286	48	81	L1
St. Louis All-Stars	1	4	2	.200	25	74	L1
Hammond Pros	1	5	1	.167	14	59	L4
Akron Pros	1	6	0	.143	25	74	W1
Dayton Triangles	1	6	1	.143	16	95	L2
Oorang Indians	1	10	0	.091	50	257	W1
Louisville Brecks	0	3	0	.000	0	90	L3
Rochester Jeffersons	0	4	0	.000	6	141	L4

Note: Tie games were not officially counted in the standings until 1972.

== Roster ==
Official team photo of the 1923 Green Bay Packers.

The following players saw action in at least one NFL game for the 1923 Green Bay Packers. The total number of NFL games in which they appeared during the year follows in parentheses.

Linemen

- Cub Buck (10) †
- Jug Earp (8) †
- Milton "Moose" Gardner (9) †
- Jack "Dolly" Gray (1)
- Norbert Hayes (6)
- Kenyon †
- Wes Leaper (2)
- Dewey Lyle (9) †
- Jab Murray (9)
- Wally Niemann (10) †
- Vincent "Cowboy" Wheeler (10) †
- Whitey Woodin (10)

Backs

- Myrt Basing (9)
- Patrick "Buck" Gavin (9) †
- Harold Hansen (1)
- Curly Lambeau (10) †
- Charlie Mathys (10) †
- Stan Mills (9) †

†- Denotes player in starting lineup for the non-NFL season opener against Hibbing.
