= Ernie Winburn =

American football player (1897–1953)

Profile
- Position: End

Personal information
- Born: April 26, 1897; Lee's Summit, Missouri, U.S.
- Died: November 25, 1953 (aged 56); Kansas City, Missouri, U.S.
- Listed height: 5 ft 11 in (1.80 m)
- Listed weight: 175 lb (79 kg)

Career information
- High school: Lee's Summit (MO) and Wentworth Military School (MO)
- College: Warrensburg

Career history
- St. Louis All-Stars (1923)

Awards and highlights
- Third-team All-MIAA (1919)

Career NFL statistics
- Games played: 1
- Stats at Pro Football Reference

Earnest E. Winburn (April 26, 1897 – November 25, 1953) was an American football end who played one season for the St. Louis All-Stars of the National Football League (NFL). He played in 1923, the All-Stars' only season.

== Biography ==
Winburn was born on April 26, 1897, in Lee's Summit, Missouri. He went to two high schools: Lee's Summit High School and Wentworth Military School, both in Missouri.

Winburn played college football for the Mules of Warrensburg Normal School (now known as the University of Central Missouri) from 1915 to 1916 as a left tackle. He left Warrensburg in 1917 at the outbreak of World War I and enlisted in the United States Marine Corps. He served on the USS Wyoming during the war. He returned to Warrensburg afterwards, and was selected as a third-team guard on the 1919 All-Missouri Intercollegiate Athletic Association football team.

In 1923, Winburn played his first and only season professionally, appearing in one game for the St. Louis All-Stars at end. During his one season, he was 5 feet 11 inches tall, and 175 pounds. He is one of only eight of his college's alumni ever to play in the NFL. Winburn did not make any appearances after the season as the All-Stars folded from the league. On November 25, 1953, at the age of 56, he died of a heart attack at a friend's house in Kansas City, Missouri. He worked for the Phillips Petroleum Company at the time of his death, and had lived in Kansas City, Kansas for 11 years.
