= John Cardwell =

American football player and coach (1896–1979)

Profile
- Positions: Halfback, Quarterback, Placekicker, Punter

Personal information
- Born: June 6, 1896; Waverly, Tioga County, New York, U.S.
- Died: October 19, 1979 (aged 83); Kokomo, Indiana, U.S.
- Listed height: 5 ft 9 in (1.75 m)
- Listed weight: 170 lb (77 kg)

Career information
- High school: Waverly
- College: None

Career history

Playing
- Kokomo American Legion (c.1919–c.1922); St. Louis All-Stars (1923)

Coaching
- Kokomo American Legion baseball (1940s)

Career statistics
- Games played: 2
- Games started: 1
- Stats at Pro Football Reference

John Wyatt "Cap" Cardwell (June 6, 1896 – October 19, 1979 (Note: His Indiana Death Certificate says he died on October 20)) was an American football player who played one season with the St. Louis All-Stars of the National Football League (NFL). He also played for the Kokomo American Legion football team as well as coached their 1940s baseball team.

== Early life and education ==
John Cardwell was born on June 6, 1896, in Waverly, Tioga County, New York. He played high school football there before going to the United States Army during World War I in France. While at the high school he played quarterback and halfback, leading his team to the 1913 State Championship. He did not attend college.

== Football career ==
Before playing professionally, he was a popular player for the Kokomo American Legion football team as team captain. They won the State Championship in 1921. After a few seasons with the American Legion team, he went to the professional St. Louis All-Stars of the National Football League. He played two games there, starting one, before a shoulder injury forced him to miss the season. He played multiple positions with the All-Stars, they included: quarterback, halfback, placekicker, and punter. The next year, the All-Stars folded from the league, ending Cardwell's professional career.

== Later life and death ==
Cardwell got a job at the Stone Webster Company in 1920. He later worked for the Public Service of Indiana. During the early 1940s, Cardwell was the chief clerk of Howard County War Price and Rating Board. He held the position until 1944 when he became the district mileage representative of the Indiana Office of Price Administration. He was defeated in the 1945 primary election while running for sheriff as a republican. Cardwell was then employed at Sears Roebuck and Company for 18 years as a division manager. He retired in 1961 to travel Europe, Asia, and the United States.

Two years after his professional career ended, he married Mildred Tiplady (Cardwell). They had two sons, Richard and John.

Cardwell died on October 19, 1979, at the St. Joseph Memorial Hospital in Kokomo, Indiana. He was 83 and died of an apparent heart attack.
