= Myrt Basing =

American football player (1900–1957)

Profile
- Position: Halfback

Personal information
- Born: October 29, 1900; Appleton, Wisconsin, U.S.
- Died: April 29, 1957 (aged 56); Colorado Springs, Colorado, U.S.
- Listed height: 5 ft 9 in (1.75 m)
- Listed weight: 190 lb (86 kg)

Career information
- High school: Appleton
- College: Lawrence

Career history
- Green Bay Packers (1923–1927)

Career statistics
- Games played: 41
- Games started: 28
- Rushing TDs: 7
- Receiving TDs: 2

Myrton Nathan Basing (October 29, 1900 – April 29, 1957) was a halfback in the National Football League (NFL).

== Biography ==
Basing was born Myrton Nathan Basing on October 29, 1900, in Appleton, Wisconsin. He died in 1957 in Colorado Springs, Colorado.

== Career ==
Basing played with the Green Bay Packers for five seasons. He played at the collegiate level at Lawrence University.
