= 1923 Buffalo All-Americans season =

National Football League team season

- Head coach: Tommy Hughitt
- Home stadium: Buffalo Baseball Park (5); Canisius Villa (1)

Results
- Record: 5–4–3
- Division place: 8th NFL
- Playoffs: No playoffs until 1932

The 1923 Buffalo All-Americans season was their fourth in the league and final season as the All-Americans. The team matched their previous output of 5–4–1, going 5–4–3. They finished eighth in the league.

The season saw the All-Americans moving to a new home venue, leaving the Villa at Canisius University in favor of Buffalo Baseball Park, a newly upgraded facility with a covered grandstand.

== Schedule ==
Game	Date	Opponent	Result	Record	Venue	Attendance	Recap	Sources
1	September 30	at Chicago Cardinals	L 0–3	0–1	Normal Park		Recap	
2	October 7	Akron Pros	W 9–0	1–1	Buffalo Baseball Park	10,000	Recap	
3	October 14	at Columbus Tigers	W 3–0	2–1	Neil Park	3,500	Recap	
4	October 21	Oorang Indians	W 57–0	3–1	Buffalo Baseball Park	12,000	Recap	
5	October 28	at Chicago Bears	L 3–18	3–2	Cubs Park		Recap	
6	November 4	Cleveland Indians	T 0–0	3–2–1	Buffalo Baseball Park	3,000	Recap	
7	November 11	Canton Bulldogs	T 3–3	3–2–2	Buffalo Baseball Park	10,000	Recap	
8	November 18	Dayton Triangles	W 3–0	4–2–2	Buffalo Baseball Park	3,500	Recap	
9	November 25	Toledo Maroons	T 3–3	4–2–3	Canisius Villa		Recap	
10	November 29	at Akron Pros	L 0–2	4–3–3	Wooster Avenue Stadium	1,700	Recap	
11	December 1	at Rochester Jeffersons	W 13–0	5–3–3	Edgerton Park		Recap	
12	December 2	at Canton Bulldogs	L 0–14	5–4–3	Lakeside Park	4,000	Recap	
Note: Thanksgiving Day: November 29.

== Standings ==
In 1923 the All-Americans moved to Buffalo Baseball Park, home of the Buffalo Bisons of the International League.

NFL standings
	W	L	T	PCT	PF	PA	STK
Canton Bulldogs	11	0	1	1.000	246	19	W5
Chicago Bears	9	2	1	.818	123	35	W1
Green Bay Packers	7	2	1	.778	85	34	W5
Milwaukee Badgers	7	2	3	.778	100	49	W1
Cleveland Indians	3	1	3	.750	52	49	L1
Chicago Cardinals	8	4	0	.667	161	56	L1
Duluth Kelleys	4	3	0	.571	35	33	L3
Buffalo All-Americans	5	4	3	.556	94	43	L1
Columbus Tigers	5	4	1	.556	119	35	L1
Toledo Maroons	3	3	2	.500	35	66	L1
Racine Legion	4	4	2	.500	86	76	W1
Rock Island Independents	2	3	3	.400	84	62	L1
Minneapolis Marines	2	5	2	.286	48	81	L1
St. Louis All-Stars	1	4	2	.200	25	74	L1
Hammond Pros	1	5	1	.167	14	59	L4
Akron Pros	1	6	0	.143	25	74	W1
Dayton Triangles	1	6	1	.143	16	95	L2
Oorang Indians	1	10	0	.091	50	257	W1
Louisville Brecks	0	3	0	.000	0	90	L3
Rochester Jeffersons	0	4	0	.000	6	141	L4

Note: Tie games were not officially counted in the standings until 1972.
