= 1923 Chicago Cardinals season =

American football team season

- Owner: Chris O'Brien
- Head coach: Arnie Horween
- Home stadium: Normal Park (4), Comiskey Park (8)

Results
- Record: 8–4 (NFL) (9–4 overall)
- League place: 6th NFL

The 1923 Chicago Cardinals season was their fourth in the National Football League (NFL). The team played all but one of their games at home during the 1923 season, with the sole exception a game across town against the Chicago Bears. The Cards finished with a record of 8 wins and 4 losses for the year, good for sixth place in the 20-team league.

The Cardinals moved midseason from their traditional Normal Park venue to the more spacious confines of Comiskey Park during the 1923 season, firmly establishing themselves as the team of Southside Chicago.

== Schedule ==
On November 25 against Racine, the Cardinals became the only team in NFL history to score exactly 4 points in a game.

Week	Date	Opponent	Result	Record	Venue	Attendance	Recap	Sources
—	September 23	Opal Athletic Club	W 13–0	—	Normal Park		—	
1	September 30	Buffalo All-Americans	W 3–0	1–0	Normal Park		Recap	
2	October 7	Rochester Jeffersons	W 60–0	2–0	Normal Park	5,000	Recap	
3	October 14	Akron Pros	W 19–0	3–0	Normal Park		Recap	
4	October 21	Minneapolis Marines	W 9–0	4–0	Comiskey Park	4,000	Recap	
5	October 28	Dayton Triangles	W 13–3	5–0	Comiskey Park	5,000	Recap	
6	November 4	Canton Bulldogs	L 3–7	5–1	Comiskey Park	5,500	Recap	
7	November 11	Hammond Pros	W 6–0	6–1	Comiskey Park	3,500	Recap	
8	November 18	Duluth Kelleys	W 10–0	7–1	Comiskey Park	5,500	Recap	
9	November 25	Racine Legion	L 4–10	7–2	Comiskey Park	7,000	Recap	
10	November 29	at Chicago Bears	L 0–3	7–3	Cubs Park	13,500	Recap	
11	December 2	Oorang Indians	W 22–19	8–3	Comiskey Park	1,200	Recap	
12	December 9	Milwaukee Badgers	L 12–14	8–4	Comiskey Park	6,000	Recap	
Note: Games in italics indicate a non-NFL opponent. Thanksgiving Day: November 29.

== Standings ==
The extreme limitations of Normal Park as a football venue are evident in this photograph of Cards back Paddy Driscoll (arrow) carrying the ball through the Buffalo All-Americans' line, September 30. Although virtually indistinguishable here, the Cardinals wore bright red-and-white jerseys, the All-Americans, black-and-orange.

NFL standings
	W	L	T	PCT	PF	PA	STK
Canton Bulldogs	11	0	1	1.000	246	19	W5
Chicago Bears	9	2	1	.818	123	35	W1
Green Bay Packers	7	2	1	.778	85	34	W5
Milwaukee Badgers	7	2	3	.778	100	49	W1
Cleveland Indians	3	1	3	.750	52	49	L1
Chicago Cardinals	8	4	0	.667	161	56	L1
Duluth Kelleys	4	3	0	.571	35	33	L3
Buffalo All-Americans	5	4	3	.556	94	43	L1
Columbus Tigers	5	4	1	.556	119	35	L1
Toledo Maroons	3	3	2	.500	35	66	L1
Racine Legion	4	4	2	.500	86	76	W1
Rock Island Independents	2	3	3	.400	84	62	L1
Minneapolis Marines	2	5	2	.286	48	81	L1
St. Louis All-Stars	1	4	2	.200	25	74	L1
Hammond Pros	1	5	1	.167	14	59	L4
Akron Pros	1	6	0	.143	25	74	W1
Dayton Triangles	1	6	1	.143	16	95	L2
Oorang Indians	1	10	0	.091	50	257	W1
Louisville Brecks	0	3	0	.000	0	90	L3
Rochester Jeffersons	0	4	0	.000	6	141	L4

Note: Tie games were not officially counted in the standings until 1972.
