= Dick O'Donnell =

American football player (1900–1947)

- O'Donnell as a rookie with Duluth

No. 5, 20, 30
- Positions: End, Halfback

Personal information
- Born: July 31, 1900; Duluth, Minnesota, U.S.
- Died: January 19, 1947 (aged 46)
- Listed height: 6 ft 0 in (1.83 m)
- Listed weight: 190 lb (86 kg)

Career information
- College: Minnesota

Career history
- Duluth Kelleys (1923); Green Bay Packers (1924–1930); Brooklyn Dodgers (1931)

Awards and highlights
- Third-team All-Pro (1923)

Career NFL statistics
- Games played: 92
- Starts: 77
- Touchdowns: 6
- Stats at Pro Football Reference

Richard Lawrence O'Donnell (July 31, 1900 – January 19, 1947) was an American football player. He played most of his nine-year career with the Green Bay Packers. O'Donnell played college football for the Minnesota Golden Gophers

O'Donnell was tapped as a third team NFL All-Pro as a rookie in 1923 by a vote of 15 sportswriters from NFL cities. He was the only member of his Kelley-Duluth team so honored in that season.
