= A. C. Baur =

American football player and stock broker (1900–1931)

Profile
- Position: Tackle

Personal information
- Born: January 11, 1900; Illinois, U.S.
- Died: January 18, 1931 (aged 31); Chicago, Illinois, U.S.
- Listed height: 6 ft 2 in (1.88 m)
- Listed weight: 210 lb (95 kg)

Career information
- High school: Carl Schurz (IL)
- College: Illinois

Career history
- Racine Legion (1923)

Career statistics
- Games played: 1
- Games started: 1
- Stats at Pro Football Reference

Adelbert Chamisso Baur, sometimes spelled Bauer (January 11, 1900 – January 18, 1931) was an American football tackle and stock broker who played one game in the National Football League (NFL) for the Racine Legion. He played college football at Illinois.

== Early life and education ==
Baur was born on January 11, 1900, in Illinois. He attended Carl Schurz High School in Chicago, and after graduating from there, played college football at the University of Illinois. He was described by coach Robert Zuppke in 1922 as one of "the best [players] at the present time."

== Professional career ==
After graduating in 1923, Baur was signed to play professional football in the National Football League (NFL) by the Racine Legion. He played the tackle position, and was reported as 6 feet, 2 inches tall, and 210 pounds. Baur appeared in one game during the season, starting in his one appearance, as the Legion finished the season with a record of 4–4–2, tenth place in the league.

== Later life and death ==
In 1928, Baur was named a member of the Chicago Stock Exchange and organized A. C. Baur & Co. On January 18, 1931, Baur committed suicide at his home in Chicago. The Chicago Tribune reported, "Dr. Emil F. Baur. 2536 Smalley court, father of the broker [A. C. Baur], said he believed his son had suffered a nervous breakdown from worry and overwork. Dr. Baur said his son had no domestic or financial worries, but had been depressed about the reorganization of his company, which was to have taken place Feb. 1. [1931]."
