= Stan Mills =

American football player (1893–1933)

No. 9
- Position: Fullback

Personal information
- Born: December 3, 1896; Philadelphia, Pennsylvania, US
- Died: April 1933 (aged 37); Hazleton, Pennsylvania, US
- Listed height: 5 ft 9 in (1.75 m)
- Listed weight: 180 lb (82 kg)

Career information
- College: Penn State

Career history
- Green Bay Packers (1922–1923); Akron Pros (1924)

Career statistics
- Touchdowns: 4
- Stats at Pro Football Reference

Stanley Mills Jr. (December 3, 1893 – April 1933) was an American football fullback in the National Football League. He played two seasons with the Green Bay Packers before spending his final season with the Akron Pros.
