= James Finnegan (American football) =

American football player (1901–1967)

Profile
- Positions: End, quarterback

Personal information
- Born: January 20, 1901; St. Louis, Missouri, U.S.
- Died: September 6, 1967 (aged 66); Crestwood, Missouri, U.S.
- Listed height: 5 ft 8 in (1.73 m)
- Listed weight: 160 lb (73 kg)

Career information
- College: St. Louis

Career history
- St. Louis All-Stars (1923)

Career statistics
- Games played: 2
- Stats at Pro Football Reference

James Patrick Finnegan (January 20, 1901 – September 6, 1967) was an American football end and quarterback who played one season for the St. Louis All-Stars of the National Football League (NFL).

Finnegan was born on January 20, 1901, in St. Louis, Missouri. He went to college at St. Louis from 1918 to 1921. In 1923, he played in two games for the St. Louis All-Stars of the National Football League. He played end and quarterback. 1923 was his only season professionally. He died on September 6, 1967, in Crestwood, Missouri at the age of 66.
