= Orville Siegfried =

American football player (1903–1965)

Orville Maynard Siegfried
Profile
- Position: TB/HB

Personal information
- Born: February 19, 1903; Pittsburgh, Pennsylvania, U.S.
- Died: May 1965 (aged 62)
- Listed height: 5 ft 10 in (1.78 m)
- Listed weight: 190 lb (86 kg)

Career information
- College: Washington & Jefferson College

Career history
- St. Louis All-Stars (1923)
- Stats at Pro Football Reference

Orville Maynard Siegfried (February 19, 1903 – May 1965) was an American professional football player for the St. Louis All-Stars. He attended high school in Lee's Summit, Missouri. He attended Washington & Jefferson College.

== Notes ==
- Career statistics from NFL.com · Pro Football Reference ·
