= Irv Langhoff =

American football player (1897–1952)

Profile
- Position: Back

Personal information
- Born: August 24, 1897; Milwaukee, Wisconsin, US
- Died: January 12, 1952 (aged 54); Milwaukee, Wisconsin, US
- Listed height: 5 ft 9 in (1.75 m)
- Listed weight: 158 lb (72 kg)

Career information
- College: Marquette

Career history
- Racine Legion (1922–1923)
- Stats at Pro Football Reference

John Irvin Langhoff (August 24, 1897 – January 12, 1952) was a player in the National Football League for the Racine Legion in 1922 and 1923. He played at the collegiate level at Marquette University.

== Biography ==
Langhoff was born on August 24, 1897, in Milwaukee, Wisconsin. He died there in 1952.
