= Bill Stein (American football) =

American football player (1899–1983)

Profile
- Position: Offensive lineman

Personal information
- Born: May 28, 1899; Two Harbors, Minnesota, U.S.
- Listed height: 6 ft 0 in (1.83 m)
- Listed weight: 190 lb (86 kg)

Career information
- High school: Two Harbors (MN)
- College: Fordham

Career history
- Duluth Kelleys/Eskimos (1923–1927); Chicago Cardinals (1928–1929)

Career statistics
- Games played: 39
- Games started: 31
- Stats at Pro Football Reference

William Earl Stein (May 28, 1899 – August 27, 1983) was a professional American football offensive lineman in the National Football League. He played seven seasons for the Duluth Kelleys/Eskimos (1923–1927) and the Chicago Cardinals (1928–1929).
