= Bill Rooney =

American football player (1896–1966)

Profile
- Position: Running back

Personal information
- Born: July 16, 1896; Ottawa, Ontario, Canada
- Died: March 17, 1966 (aged 69); New York City, U.S.
- Listed height: 6 ft 2 in (1.88 m)
- Listed weight: 194 lb (88 kg)

Career history
- Duluth Kelleys/Eskimos (1923–1925, 1927); New York Giants (1925); Brooklyn Lions (1926); Chicago Cardinals (1929)
- Stats at Pro Football Reference

Bill Rooney was one of three Rooney brothers starting for the NFL's Kelley-Duluth team in 1924.

William Rooney (July 16, 1896 – March 17, 1966) was a professional American football player who played running back for six seasons for the Duluth Kelleys/Eskimos, New York Giants, Brooklyn Lions, and Chicago Cardinals.
