= Ben Hunt (American football) =

American football player (1900–1981)

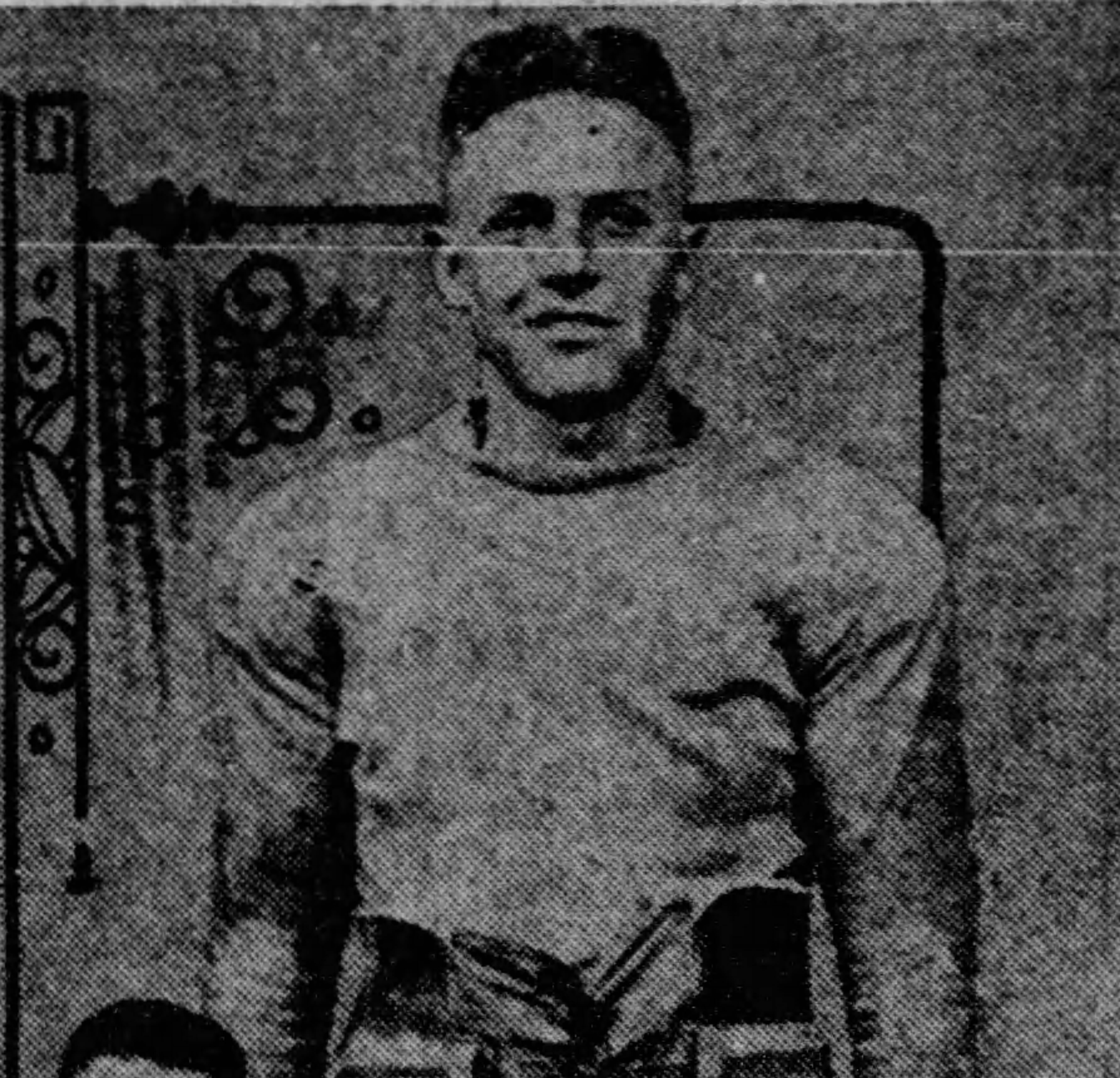
- Ben Hunt, 1921

Profile
- Position: Tackle

Personal information
- Born: September 16, 1900; Scottsboro, Alabama, U.S.
- Died: June 1, 1981 (aged 80); Scottsboro, Alabama, U.S.
- Listed height: 5 ft 9 in (1.75 m)
- Listed weight: 185 lb (84 kg)

Career information
- High school: Scottsboro (AL)
- College: Alabama

Career history
- Toledo Maroons (1923)

Career statistics
- Games: 3

Ben Hunt (September 16, 1900 – June 1981) was an American football player.

Hunt was born in 1900 in Scottsboro, Alabama, and attended Scottsboro High School. He played college football for the Alabama Crimson Tide from 1919 to 1922. He was a member of the 1920 Alabama Crimson Tide football team that compiled a 10–1 record, losing its only game to national champion Georgia, under head coach Xen C. Scott.

Hunt later played professional football as a tackle for the 1923 Toledo Maroons in the National Football League (NFL). He appeared in three NFL games during the 1923 season.

Hunt died in 1981 at age 80.
