= 1923 Columbus Tigers season =

National Football League team season

- Head coach: Gus Tebell and Pete Stinchcomb

Results
- Record: 5–4–1
- League place: 8th NFL

The 1923 Columbus Tigers season was their fourth in the league and first season as the Tigers. The team improved on their previous output of 0–8, winning five games. They finished eighth in the league.

== Schedule ==
Game	Date	Opponent	Result	Record	Venue	Attendance	Recap	Sources
1	September 30	at Dayton Triangles	L 6–7	0–1	Triangle Park	6,000	Recap	
2	October 7	at Milwaukee Badgers	T 0–0	0–1–1	Athletic Park	2,000	Recap	
3	October 14	Buffalo All-Americans	L 0–3	0–2–1	Neil Park	3,500	Recap	
4	October 21	Louisville Brecks	W 34–0	1–2–1	Neil Park			
5	October 28	at Toledo Maroons	W 3–0	2–2–1	Armory Park	5,000	Recap	
—	November 4	Akron Pros	canceled due to rain					
6	November 11	Toledo Maroons	W 16–0	3–2–1	Neil Park		Recap	
7	November 18	at Cleveland Indians	L 3–9	3–3–1	Dunn Field	6,000	Recap	
8	November 25	Oorang Indians	W 27–3	4–3–1	Neil Park		Recap	
9	December 2	Dayton Triangles	W 30–3	5–3–1	Neil Park		Recap	
10	December 9	Canton Bulldogs	L 0–10	5–4–1	Neil Park	1,700	Recap	

== Standings ==
NFL standings
	W	L	T	PCT	PF	PA	STK
Canton Bulldogs	11	0	1	1.000	246	19	W5
Chicago Bears	9	2	1	.818	123	35	W1
Green Bay Packers	7	2	1	.778	85	34	W5
Milwaukee Badgers	7	2	3	.778	100	49	W1
Cleveland Indians	3	1	3	.750	52	49	L1
Chicago Cardinals	8	4	0	.667	161	56	L1
Duluth Kelleys	4	3	0	.571	35	33	L3
Buffalo All-Americans	5	4	3	.556	94	43	L1
Columbus Tigers	5	4	1	.556	119	35	L1
Toledo Maroons	3	3	2	.500	35	66	L1
Racine Legion	4	4	2	.500	86	76	W1
Rock Island Independents	2	3	3	.400	84	62	L1
Minneapolis Marines	2	5	2	.286	48	81	L1
St. Louis All-Stars	1	4	2	.200	25	74	L1
Hammond Pros	1	5	1	.167	14	59	L4
Akron Pros	1	6	0	.143	25	74	W1
Dayton Triangles	1	6	1	.143	16	95	L2
Oorang Indians	1	10	0	.091	50	257	W1
Louisville Brecks	0	3	0	.000	0	90	L3
Rochester Jeffersons	0	4	0	.000	6	141	L4

Note: Tie games were not officially counted in the standings until 1972.
