= Earl Gorman =

American football player (1896–1962)

Bud Gorman
- Gorman in 1922

Profile
- Positions: Guard, tackle

Personal information
- Born: May 20, 1896; Chicago, Illinois, US
- Died: August, 1969 (aged 73); Plainfield, New Jersey, US
- Listed weight: 225 lb (102 kg)

Career information
- College: None

Career history
- Racine Legion (1922—1923); Kenosha Maroons (1924)

Career NFL statistics
- Games played: 24
- Games started: 16
- Stats at Pro Football Reference

Earl Patrick "Bud" Gorman (May 20, 1896 – August 1969) was an American football guard and tackle for the Racine Legion and for the Kenosha Maroons of the National Football League (NFL).

== Biography ==
Gorman was born on May 20, 1896, in Chicago, Illinois. He died in 1969 in Plainfield, New Jersey.
