= Cliff Jetmore =

American football player

Profile
- Position: Halfback

Personal information
- Born: May 14, 1896; Near Dunkirk, Indiana, U.S.

Career history
- Fort Wayne Friars (1917); Pitcairn Quakers (1918-1920?); Toledo Maroons (1923); Wayne Tank and Pump (1923)
- Stats at Pro Football Reference

Clifford Norman Jetmore (May 14, 1896 – ) was an American football player.

Jetmore was born in 1895 in New Dunkirk, Indiana.

He reportedly played college football in Michigan. He played professional football for the Fort Wayne Friars in 1917, and thereafter for the Pitcairn Quakers. According to one account, he was responsible for Pitcairn winning the Pennsylvania state championship. He also worked as a glass worker. In 1922, he coached the football team at Muncie High School. In 1923, he was hired as a player and coach of the Wayne Tank and Pump Company football team. He also played one game of professional football as a halfback for the Toledo Maroons in the National Football League (NFL) during the 1923 season.
