= 1923 Rochester Jeffersons season =

National Football League team season

- Head coach: Leo Lyons
- Home stadium: Edgerton Park

Results
- Record: 0–4
- League place: 19th NFL

The 1923 Rochester Jeffersons season was their fourth in the league. The team equaled their previous output of 0–4–1, going 0–4. They tied for nineteenth place in the league. They allowed at least 50 points in back to back games in Weeks 1 and 2, the only NFL team to do so until the 2014 Chicago Bears did so in Weeks 8 and 10.

A protest was lodged over the Week 2 game by the Rock Island Independents, charging that Rochester had misrepresented its lineup, brought in lesser substitute players, and therefore breached their contract. The 1924 annual league meeting, held in Chicago in January, heard the dispute and decided in Rochester's favor, awarding the team the appearance guarantee that Rock Island sought to withhold.

== Schedule ==
Game	Date	Opponent	Result	Record	Venue	Attendance	Recap	Sources
—	September 30	Hornell, New York	W 46–0	—	Edgerton Park	680	—	
1	October 7	at Chicago Cardinals	L 0–60	0–1	Normal Park	5,000	Recap	
2	October 14	at Rock Island Independents	L 0–56	0–2	Douglas Park	2,500	Recap	
—	October 21	(open date)						
—	October 28	at Hammond Pros	canceled due to expected bad attendance					
—	November 4	(open date)						
—	November 11	(open date)						
—	November 18	(open date)						
3	November 24	Toledo Maroons	L 6–12	0–3	Edgerton Park		Recap	
4	December 1	Buffalo All-Americans	L 0–13	0–4	Edgerton Park		Recap	
Note: Non-NFL opponent in italics.

== Standings ==
NFL standings
	W	L	T	PCT	PF	PA	STK
Canton Bulldogs	11	0	1	1.000	246	19	W5
Chicago Bears	9	2	1	.818	123	35	W1
Green Bay Packers	7	2	1	.778	85	34	W5
Milwaukee Badgers	7	2	3	.778	100	49	W1
Cleveland Indians	3	1	3	.750	52	49	L1
Chicago Cardinals	8	4	0	.667	161	56	L1
Duluth Kelleys	4	3	0	.571	35	33	L3
Buffalo All-Americans	5	4	3	.556	94	43	L1
Columbus Tigers	5	4	1	.556	119	35	L1
Toledo Maroons	3	3	2	.500	35	66	L1
Racine Legion	4	4	2	.500	86	76	W1
Rock Island Independents	2	3	3	.400	84	62	L1
Minneapolis Marines	2	5	2	.286	48	81	L1
St. Louis All-Stars	1	4	2	.200	25	74	L1
Hammond Pros	1	5	1	.167	14	59	L4
Akron Pros	1	6	0	.143	25	74	W1
Dayton Triangles	1	6	1	.143	16	95	L2
Oorang Indians	1	10	0	.091	50	257	W1
Louisville Brecks	0	3	0	.000	0	90	L3
Rochester Jeffersons	0	4	0	.000	6	141	L4

Note: Tie games were not officially counted in the standings until 1972.
