= Doc Williams (American football) =

American football player (1899–1992)

Profile
- Position: Guard

Personal information
- Born: April 3, 1899; St. Cloud, Minnesota
- Died: April 11, 1992 (aged 93); Arden Hills, Minnesota
- Listed height: 6 ft 7 in (2.01 m)
- Listed weight: 218 lb (99 kg)

Career information
- High school: Model School (MN)
- College: St. Cloud State

Career history
- Duluth Kelleys/Eskimos (1923–1926)

Awards and highlights
- Second-team All-Pro (1924)

Daniel Adolf "Doc" Williams (April 13, 1899 – April 11, 1992) was an American football player. He played four seasons in the National Football League (NFL) as a guard for the Duluth Kelleys/Eskimos (1923–1926). He was selected as a second-team quarterback on the 1924 All-Pro Team.
