= Wayne Brenkert =

American football player and coach (1898–1979)

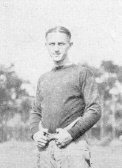

Profile
- Positions: Halfback, quarterback

Personal information
- Born: March 5, 1898; Highland Park, Michigan, U.S.
- Died: August 1, 1979 (aged 81); Eustis, Florida, U.S.
- Listed height: 5 ft 10 in (1.78 m)
- Listed weight: 170 lb (77 kg)

Career information
- College: Washington & Jefferson

Career history

Playing
- 1923–1924: Akron Pros

Coaching
- 1923–1924: Akron Pros
- Coaching profile at Pro Football Reference
- Stats at Pro Football Reference

Wayne Dewey Brenkert (March 5, 1898 – August 1, 1979) was a professional American football player-coach for the Akron Pros. Prior to his professional career, he attended Washington & Jefferson College.
