= Death Halladay =

American football player (1900–1988)

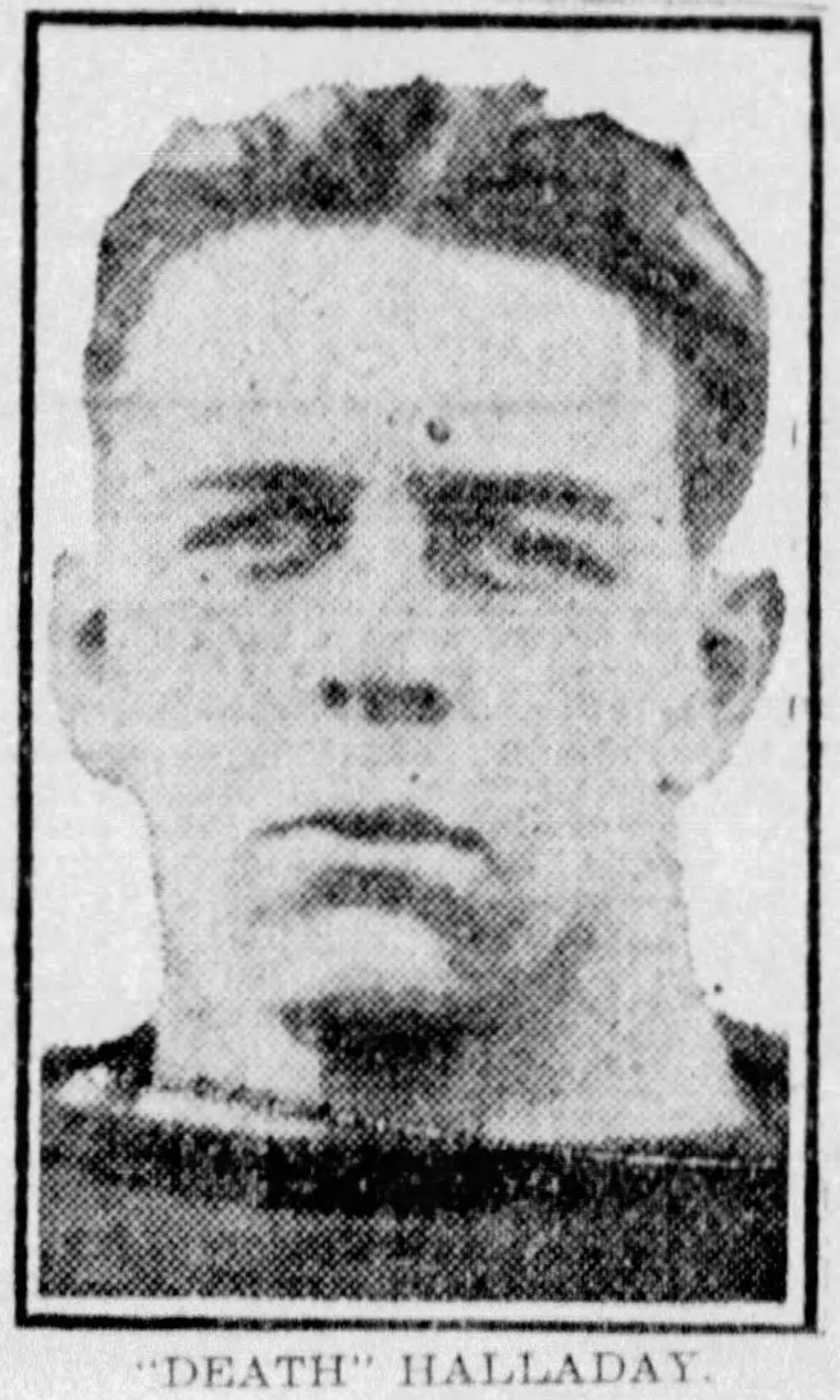
- Death Halladay, c. 1924

Profile
- Position: End

Personal information
- Born: October 29, 1900; Chicago
- Died: November 12, 1988 (aged 88); Hinsdale, Illinois
- Listed height: 6 ft 0 in (1.83 m)
- Listed weight: 175 lb (79 kg)

Career information
- High school: Hyde Park Academy (IL)
- College: Chicago

Career history
- Racine Legion (1923–1924)

Career statistics
- Games: 17

Robert Thayer "Death" Halladay (October 29, 1900 – November 12, 1988) was an American football player.

Halladay was born in 1900 in Chicago and attended Hyde Park Academy High School. He then enrolled at the University of Chicago where he played college football for Amos Alonzo Stagg's Chicago Maroons from 1918 to 1921. Halladay also played center for Chicago's basketball team and was captain of the 1921–22 team.

He played professional football as an end for the Racine Legion in the National Football League (NFL). He appeared in 17 NFL games, all of them as a starter, during the 1923 and 1924 seasons. He scored two touchdowns.

Halladay died in 1988 in Hinsdale, Illinois.
