= Joe Gillis =

American football player (1896–1967)

- Gillis, c. 1931

Profile
- Positions: Guard, tackle

Personal information
- Born: April 24, 1896; Medford, Massachusetts, U.S.
- Died: December 19, 1967 (aged 71); Detroit, Michigan, U.S.
- Listed height: 5 ft 8 in (1.73 m)
- Listed weight: 210 lb (95 kg)

Career information
- High school: West Oso (TX)
- College: Tufts, Detroit

Career history
- Toledo Maroons (1923)

Career statistics
- Games: 7

Joseph Augustus Gillis (April 24, 1896 – December 19, 1967) was an American football player and judge.

Gillis was born in 1896 in Medford, Massachusetts. He began his college education at Tufts University, where he studied medicine. During World War I, he served for 17 months in France with medical units for the Navy, Marines, and Army.

Gillis moved to Detroit after the war to attend law school at the University of Detroit. While attending law school, he played college football and was a member of the 1921 Detroit Titans football team that compiled an 8–1 with its only loss coming against Rose Bowl champion Washington & Jefferson.

Gillis also played professional football as a guard and tackle for the Toledo Maroons in the National Football League (NFL). He appeared in seven NFL games, two as a starter, during the 1923 season.

Gillis served as an assistant attorney general of Michigan from 1928 to 1931. He was appointed as a judge of the Detroit Common Pleas Court in August 1931. He was elevated to the Common Pleas court in 1939. He retired from the bench at the end of 1966 and died of cancer in 1967 at age 71 in Detroit.
