= Pete Casey =

American football player (1895–1976)

Profile
- Position: Halfback

Personal information
- Born: December 2, 1895; Potosi, Missouri
- Died: August 25, 1976 (aged 80); St. Louis, Missouri
- Listed weight: 180 lb (82 kg)

Career information
- High school: Potosi (MO)

Career history
- St. Louis All-Stars (1923)
- Stats at Pro Football Reference

Albert R. "Pete" Casey (December 2, 1895 – August 25, 1976), also known as Al Casey, was an American football player. He played one season in the National Football League (NFL) as a halfback for the St. Louis All-Stars in 1923. He started all seven games at halfback for the 1923 All-Stars and scored two touchdowns. He received "honorable mention" recognition on the 1923 All-Pro Team.
