= John R. Beasley =

American football player (1900–1978)

No. 13
- Position: Guard

Personal information
- Born: October 24, 1900; Indiana, U.S.
- Died: November 2, 1978 (aged 78); Franklin, Indiana, U.S.
- Listed height: 6 ft 3 in (1.91 m)
- Listed weight: 230 lb (104 kg)

Career information
- High school: Valley Mills
- College: Earlham

Career history
- Dayton Triangles (1923)

Career NFL statistics
- Games: 5

John R. Beasley (October 24, 1900 – November 2, 1978) was an American football player.

Beasley was born in 1900 in Indiana. His father Thomas A. Beasley was a farmer in Decatur Township. and attended Valley Mills High School. He attended Earlham College and played college football there in 1920 and 1921. He also played professional football as a guard for the Dayton Triangles in the National Football League (NFL). He appeared in five NFL games, three as a starter, during the 1923 season.

After his football career ended, Beasley lived in Indianapolis, He worked as the comptroller for Goodwill Industries, and served on the Decatur Township school board from 1958 to 1966. He moved to Franklin, Indiana, in 1966. He died in 1978 at age 78 at Johnson County Hospital in Franklin.
