= Lee Fenner =

American football player (1895–1964)

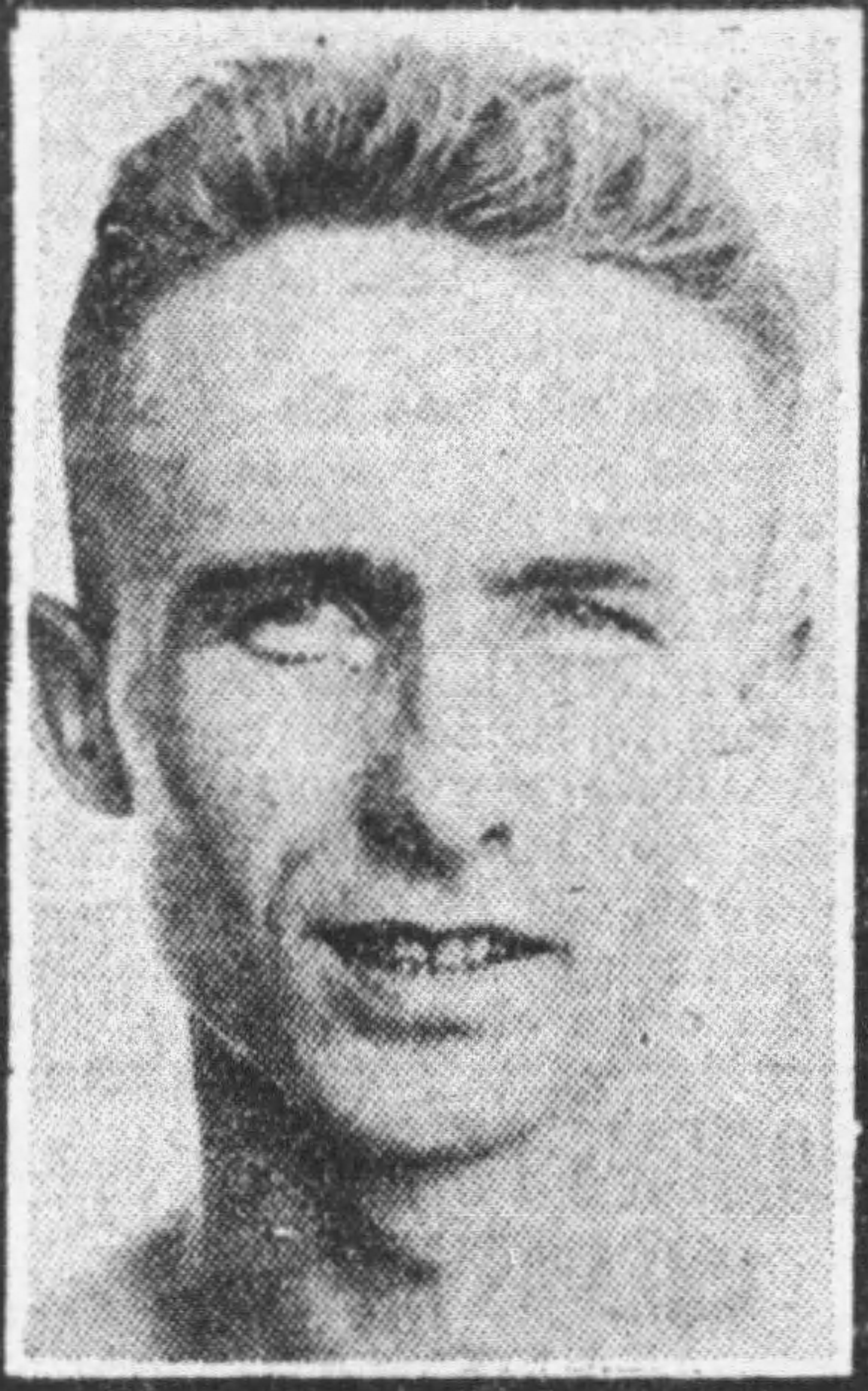

Profile
- Position: End

Personal information
- Born: November 10, 1895; Montgomery County, Ohio, U.S.
- Died: May 7, 1964 (aged 66); Dayton, Ohio, U.S.
- Listed height: 5 ft 10 in (1.78 m)
- Listed weight: 171 lb (78 kg)

Career information
- College: None

Career history
- 1916–1929: Dayton Triangles
- 1930: Portsmouth Spartans

Leland Everett Fenner (November 10, 1895 – May 7, 1964) was an end who played thirteen seasons with the Dayton Triangles in the National Football League (NFL) and one with the Portsmouth Spartans.
