= Howard Stark (American football) =

American football player (1896–1981)

Profile
- Positions: Guard, tackle

Personal information
- Born: December 20, 1896; Milwaukee, Wisconsin, U.S.
- Died: March 13, 1981 (aged 84); Chenequa, Belize

Career information
- College: University of Wisconsin

Career history
- 1923: Racine Legion

Howard Bailey Stark (December 20, 1896 - March 13, 1981) was an American professional football player who played three games at the tackle and guard positions for the Racine Legion in 1922. Stark had attended West Division Sr. High School before playing at the collegiate level with the Wisconsin Badgers in 1919 and 1920.

Stark in 1939 founded the Howard B. Stark Candy Co. of Pewaukee, Wisconsin. The company later opened branches in California and Louisiana. He also led the effort to build and expand the Milwaukee Public Museum. He died of a heart attack while on vacation in Belize.
