= Frank DeClerk =

American football player (1900–1929)

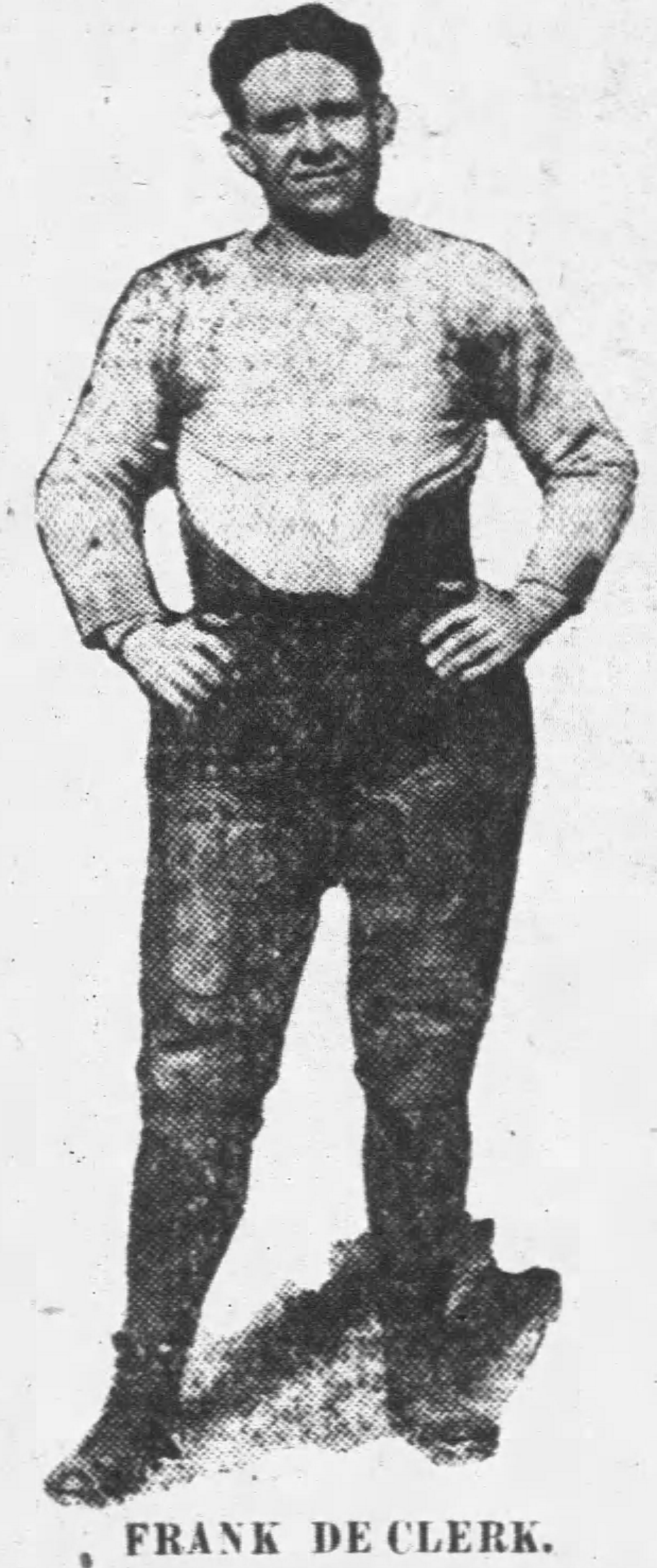

Profile
- Position: Center

Personal information
- Born: September 14, 1900; Nebraska
- Died: June 5, 1929 (aged 28); Excelsior Springs, Missouri
- Listed height: 5 ft 9 in (1.75 m)
- Listed weight: 191 lb (87 kg)

Career information
- College: St. Ambrose

Career history
- Rock Island Independents (1923–1925)

Career statistics
- Games: 20

Francis P. DeClerk (September 14, 1900 – June 5, 1929) was an American football player. He played three years in the National Football League with the Rock Island Independents from 1923 to 1925.

== Early life ==
Born in Nebraska, he moved with his family to Moline, Illinois, when he was three years old. He attended Moline High School. He enlisted in the U.S. Navy at age 17 and served on a transport ship during World War I. After the war, he attended St. Ambrose College in Davenport, Iowa, where he played baseball, basketball, and football.

== Professional football ==
He first played semipro football as the center and drop kicker for the Moline Indians in 1922. In 1923, he became the center for the Rock Island Independents of the National Football League (NFL). He played three years for Rock Island, appearing in 20 NFL games, seven as a starter, from 1923 to 1925. He continued playing professional football in 1927 for the Kewanee Tornadoes and in 1928 for the Galva Independents.

== Family and later years ==
DeClerk married Hazel Hamm in 1923. After his playing career ended, he joined his brothers, Walter and August, in the garage business in Kewanee, Illinois. He became seriously ill in 1929, reportedly following a football injury, and lost vision in his left eye. He was treated at the Mayo brothers hospital in Minnesota and was subsequently hospitalized at the Veteran's Hospital in Excelsior Springs, Missouri. He died there in June 1929 at age 28. The cause of death was reported as nephritis. He was buried at St. Mary's cemetery in East Moline.
