= Tom McNamara (American football) =

American football player (1896–1943)

Profile
- Positions: Guard, fullback

Personal information
- Born: December 14, 1896; Clinton, Massachusetts, U.S.
- Died: November 7, 1943 (age 47); Clinton, Massachusetts, U.S.
- Listed height: 5 ft 10 in (1.78 m)
- Listed weight: 210 lb (95 kg)

Career information
- High school: Clinton
- College: Tufts, Detroit

Career history
- Toledo Maroons (1923); Detroit Panthers (1925–1926)
- Stats at Pro Football Reference

Edmund Reginald "Tom" McNamara (December 15, 1896 – November 7, 1943) was an American football player.

McNamara was born in 1896 in Clinton, Massachusetts, and attended Clinton High School. He played college football for Tufts in 1917 and 1919. In 1918, he played at the fullback position for the Wentworth Naval Station football team. He later played for the University of Detroit Titans from 1920 to 1922.

He then played three seasons in the National Football League with the Toledo Maroons in 1923 and with the Detroit Panthers in 1925 and 1926. He appeared in 31 NFL games, 30 of them as a starter.

After his football career ended, he worked with the United States Secret Service. He died in 1943 at age 47 in Clinton, Massachusetts.
