= Joey Sternaman =

American football player and coach (1900–1988)

No. 8, 4
- Position: Quarterback

Personal information
- Born: February 1, 1900; Springfield, Illinois, U.S.
- Died: March 10, 1988 (aged 88); Oak Park, Illinois, U.S.
- Listed height: 5 ft 6 in (1.68 m)
- Listed weight: 152 lb (69 kg)

Career information
- High school: Springfield
- College: Illinois

Career history

Playing
- Chicago Bears (1922); Duluth Kelleys (1923); Chicago Bears (1924–1925); Chicago Bulls (1926); Chicago Bears (1927–1930)

Coaching
- Duluth Kelleys (1923) Head coach; Chicago Bulls (1926) Head coach

Awards and highlights
- 2× First-team All-Pro (1924-1925); 100 greatest Bears of All-Time
- Coaching profile at Pro Football Reference
- Stats at Pro Football Reference

Joseph Theodore Sternaman (February 1, 1900 – March 10, 1988) was an American professional football player who was a quarterback for eight seasons for the Chicago Bears and Duluth Kelleys of the National Football League (NFL). At 5'6" and 135 pounds he was called "the strongest little man I ever met" by sportswriter Grantland Rice. He played quarterback during the years Red Grange starred with the Bears. In 1926, he was the quarterback, head coach, and owner of the Chicago Bulls of the first American Football League (AFL).

== Biography ==
Sternaman makes use of the interference of Bears teammates Red Grange and the body-blocking Bill Senn to neutralize a Buffalo Bisons end, October 1929.

Joe Sternaman was born in Springfield, Illinois on February 1, 1900. He attended Springfield High School, where he was a star athlete in three sports, earning athletic letters in football for three seasons — in two of which he earned All-State honors, playing guard on the basketball team, and running for the school track and field squad. He graduated from SHS in the spring of 1919.

His older brother, E.C. "Dutch" Sternaman, was a star halfback for the University of Illinois who was drafted into World War I in May 1918, just prior to assuming captaincy of the 1918 Illinois Fighting Illini football team for his senior season, and would later become a co-owner of the Chicago Bears with his former Illinois teammate, George Halas.

Unsurprisingly, Joe followed in his older brother's footsteps, enrolling at Illinois to play for the team's legendary coach Bob Zuppke, where his brother again played halfback for the varsity squad in 1919. Joe earned a letter in 1919 as quarterback of the Illinois freshman football team and looked to join the varsity for the coming season.
