= Edward Sternaman =

American football player and owner (1895–1973)

Dutch Sternaman

No. 2, 3
- Positions: Halfback, Quarterback

Personal information
- Born: February 9, 1895; Chicago, Illinois, U.S.
- Died: February 1, 1973 (aged 77); Chicago, Illinois, U.S.
- Listed height: 5 ft 8 in (1.73 m)
- Listed weight: 176 lb (80 kg)

Career information
- High school: Springfield (Springfield, Illinois)
- College: Illinois

Career history

Playing
- Decatur Staleys / Chicago Staleys / Bears (1920–1927)

Operations
- Chicago Staleys / Bears (1921–1931; co-owner)

Awards and highlights
- NFL champion (1921); CDN First-team All-Pro (1923); George Halas Second-team All-Pro (1922); Third-team All-Pro (1920)

Career statistics
- Rushing touchdowns: 14
- Receiving touchdowns: 1
- Stats at Pro Football Reference

Edward Carl "Dutch" Sternaman (February 9, 1895 – February 1, 1973) was an American player and owner in professional football for the Chicago Bears of the National Football League (NFL). A star halfback for the University of Illinois, Sternaman was one of the key offensive players for the Bears during their formative years.

A half-owner of the Bears club together with his former Illini teammate George S. Halas, Sternaman fell into financial difficulty because of the Great Depression and sold his stake in the team to Halas for $38,000 in the summer of 1931.

== Biography ==
=== Early life ===
Dutch Sternaman was born February 9, 1895, in Chicago, Illinois. He grew up in Springfield, where he attended Springfield High School.

During the 1910s, Sternaman and George Halas both excelled on the Illinois Fighting Illini football team, with Sternaman a star halfback and Halas a gritty end. Sternaman was elected captain of the 1918 team, but was drafted into World War I in May of that year and was unable to assume this leadership role. Instead, Sternaman found himself that fall playing for the divisional football team of Camp Funston, Kansas.

In 1919, Sternaman was contacted by executives from the Arcola, Illinois (Independents) football team and asked to assemble a roster strong enough to exact revenge on A. E. Staley's team following a 41–0 loss. Although Sternaman agreed, the Staleys were not present when they became aware of the plan. Staley later approached Sternaman to increase the team's competitiveness, but he declined as he was close to finishing his mechanical engineering degree at Illinois.

=== Professional football ===
Sternaman's first foray into professional football was as a hired gun for Davenport Athletic Club in November 1919, along with Illini teammate Burt Ingwersen.

In 1920, Halas assumed control of the Staleys, and on June 14 Sternaman became the first player to sign with the team. During the 1920 season, Sternaman would rush for 11 touchdowns. He was also known for his kicking prowess, finishing his career with 21 field goals and 28 extra points when including 1920.

When the team moved to Chicago in 1921, Halas "offered" 50 percent of the club to Sternaman. At season's end, the two competed with agent Bill Harley for ownership of the Staleys. The other owners in the American Professional Football Association (now National Football League) decided in favor of the Halas/Sternaman partnership by an 8–2 vote. For the next decade, Halas was the face of the franchise, representing the Bears at league meetings. Although Sternaman was a full partner, he largely stayed in the background.

The Staleys were renamed the Bears in 1922. Joey Sternaman, Dutch's younger brother, also played for the team. Dutch retired as a player in 1927, two years before Halas.

Professional football was the weak sister to the college game throughout the 1920s and 1930s, with most franchises losing money by the boatload. The coming of the Great Depression dramatically worsened the financial situation, with the Bears managing to barely avoid insolvency. Sternaman found himself unable to pay the mortgage on either his apartment or the gas station he had invested in and in the summer of 1931 he approached Halas to buy out his half of the Bears for $38,000 (the equivalent of approximately $785,000 in 2025).

The request was difficult for Halas to meet, but he set about borrowing funds from friends and family, and was eventually able to raise the necessary sum, cashing out Sternaman. By the start of the 1931 Chicago Bears season, Halas was in a position of sole ownership of the team.

=== Life after football ===
In addition to his ownership of the Sternaman Oil Company, Sternaman became the proprietor of the Hubbard Cartage Company.

In 1934, Sternamen purchased and fenced off a lakefront property at Lake Ivanhoe, Wisconsin, a small, predominantly Black vacation community. He intended to convert the property into a racially segregated, whites-only resort. Black neighbors filed a civil lawsuit, and the court ruled against Sternamen on the grounds that the beaches and parks around Lake Ivanhoe were a public good.

In 1948, he coached at North Park University in Chicago.

Sternamen died at his home in the Villa District on Chicago’s Northwest Side on February 1, 1973, at the age of 77. After dinner, he went to his den, where he fell asleep in a chair and did not awaken.

== Sources ==
- Willis, Chris (August 19, 2010). The Man Who Built the National Football League: Joe F. Carr. Scarecrow Press. ISBN 978-0810876705.
