= Athletic Park (Duluth) =

Former stadium in Duluth, Minnesota, US

Coordinates: 46°45′21.9″N 92°08′45.2″W

- Interactive map of Athletic Park
- Location: Duluth, Minnesota
- Owner: Duluth, Minnesota
- Capacity: 6,000 (American football)
- Surface: Grass

Construction
- Built: 1903
- Opened: 1903
- Closed: 1940
- Demolished: 1941

Tenants
- Duluth Kelleys/Eskimos (NFL) (1923-1926); Duluth White Sox (MiLB (1903-1916, 1934); Duluth Dukes (MiLB) (1935-1940)

Athletic Park is a former baseball and American football stadium located in Duluth, Minnesota. Constructed in 1903, the park was the home of the Duluth White Sox (1903–1916, 1934) and the Duluth Dukes (1935–1940). The stadium was also home to the Duluth Kelleys/Eskimos of the National Football League (1923–1926). It had a capacity of 6,000 spectators. It was demolished and replaced by Wade Stadium in 1941.
