= Armory Park =

Baseball venue in Toledo, Ohio, United States

- Interactive map of Armory Park
- Location: Spielbusch Ave. & Orange St. Toledo, Ohio
- Coordinates: 41°39′22.67″N 83°32′10.32″W
- Surface: Natural Grass

Construction
- Demolished: 1934

Tenants
- Toledo Mud Hens (AA) (1897–1908); Toledo Athletic Association (OL) (1902–1906); Toledo Maroons (OL) (1907–1908); Toledo Maroons (NFL) (1922)

Armory Park was a minor league baseball park in Toledo, Ohio. It was the home of the Toledo Mud Hens and their predecessors from 1897 until mid-season 1909 when Swayne Field opened.

Armory Park is the first Toledo ballpark for which any photograph is known to survive. The various sources listed herein give somewhat different descriptions of the ballpark's location. The clearest description is provided by the book Baseball in Toledo, which includes a "bird's-eye-view" (p. 20) of the downtown area, including the Armory and the ballpark. This illustration is not contemporary but is a reconstruction drawn in 1943. That book does not give specific dimensions but states that right-field was so short that fly balls hit over the fence in that area were ground-rule doubles. The Sanborn map (pictured) defines its location well.

Armory Park in 1905

The Armory itself was on the south corner of Spielbusch Avenue (to the northwest, the portion of the road later renamed Judge Joseph Flores Avenue) and Orange Street (to the northeast). The next street southwest was Beech Street. The lot between Beech and the Armory was the location of the ballpark, precisely where the current U.S. District Courthouse now stands. The ballpark and the rest of the Armory property were bounded on the southeast by North Ontario Street.

When the land was redeveloped for the government complex, Beech and Ontario were removed as public streets in that area, resulting in the larger block now bounded by Speilbusch, Orange, North Erie Street (southeast), and Jackson Street (southwest). The Lucas County Courthouse is across Jackson to the southwest.

The home plate/grandstand area of the ballpark was tucked into the Spielbusch-Beech corner, with the lot being otherwise surrounded by a board fence, except for the left field area, whose high masonry wall was actually the rear wall of the Armory building. This is visible in the photograph in the external link.

This venue immediately replaced one of the two previous Toledo ballparks, Ewing Street Park. Weekend games continued to be played at Bay View Park through the 1900 season. For the next 8 1/2 seasons, Armory Park was the Mud Hens exclusive home.

The final game at Armory Park was played on July 2, 1909, the day before Swayne Field's debut. (Toledo Baseball Guide, p. 98)

The Armory building itself was destroyed by fire in 1934, in connection with rioting in the Auto-Lite strike.

== Sources ==
- The Toledo Baseball Guide of the Mud Hens 1883–1943, Ralph Elliott Lin Weber, 1944.
- Ballparks of North America, Michael Benson, McFarland, 1989.
- Baseball in Toledo, John R. Husman, Arcadia, 2003.
