= Nicollet Park =

Baseball ground in Minneapolis, Minnesota

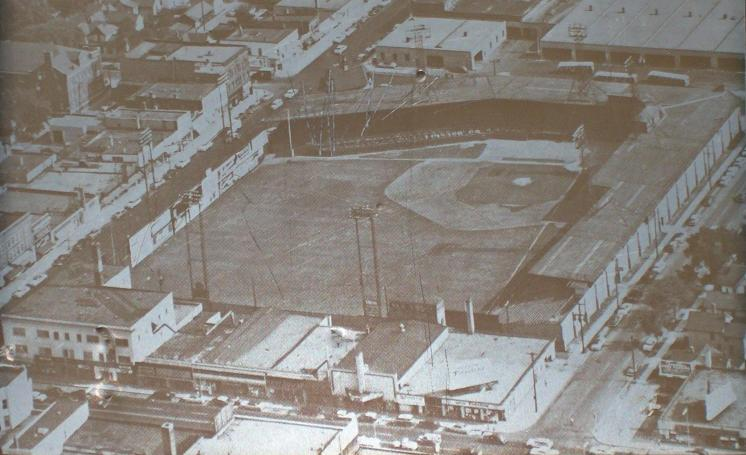
- Interactive map of Nicollet Park
- Full name: Nicollet Ballpark
- Former names: Wright Field (1896)
- Location: Minneapolis, Minnesota
- Coordinates: 44°56′51″N 93°16′43″W
- Owner: Minneapolis Millers (1896–1955)
- Capacity: 4,000
- Surface: Grass
- Field size: LF 334; CF 435; RF 279

Construction
- Groundbreaking: 1896
- Built: 1896
- Renovated: 1911
- Expanded: 1937
- Closed: 1955
- Cost: $4,000

Nicollet Park (/ˈnɪkəlɪt/ NIH-kə-lit) was a baseball ground located in Minneapolis, Minnesota, United States. The venue was home to the minor league Minneapolis Millers of the Western League and later American Association from 1896 to 1955.

The ballpark opened on June 20, 1896, with a 13–6 win over Milwaukee. The new grounds were first known as Wright Field, named for one of baseball's founding fathers, Harry Wright. Area newspapers had held a contest and chose that name over "Nicollet Park" among others, awarding season tickets to the winning entrants. The papers acknowledged the built-in pun on "right field", and added to it by describing one hit in the opener as a home run "knocked by the right-fielder, across right field, out of Wright Field."

The club owners were not enamored of the name, and it was soon renamed "Nicollet Park", the name "Nicollet" being ubiquitous in Minneapolis then and now.

The wooden ballpark was replaced by a steel and concrete structure in 1912. Lights were installed in 1937. The first night game was played on July 16, with the Millers hosting the arch-rival St. Paul Saints. The teams had also played the previous night, in Lexington Park's first night game.

The ballpark was on a small block bounded by Nicollet Avenue on the east, 31st Street on the south, Blaisdell Avenue on the west and Lake Street (or 30th Street) on the north in the present-day Lyndale neighborhood. Home plate was in the southwest corner. A small ticket office building with a Spanish-style roof stood outside the right field corner, at the Nicollet-31st intersection.

Because of its location, the field dimensions at Nicollet Park favored left-handed batters. The park was considered a "homer haven" because of its official distance down the right-field line, listed as 279 feet. In fact, the distance was actually closer to 260 feet, but this never made it out of the local press. In 1955, the Millers had a team with particular home run prowess, setting the league record by decimating their own franchise record of 217 by smashing 241 home runs. The Millers collected 163 (nearly 68%) of those four-baggers at Nicollet Park. With the all-time league home run record in tow, the Millers went on to become the American Association champions that year.

Joe Hauser hit 69 homers for the Millers in 1933. Ted Williams also made a bit of a splash here in 1938, on his way up to the major leagues, registering 43 round-trippers to lead the league. Willie Mays was enjoyed by the Minneapolis fans for only a month or so in 1951 before the parent club New York Giants brought the young ballplayer to the big leagues.

Nicollet Park, which had opened with a big win 60 years earlier, went out with a bang on September 28, 1955, as the Millers won the American Association championship tournament, and then went on to vie for the Junior World Series championship, facing the Rochester Red Wings of the International League. The series went the distance of seven games, and the finale on September 28 was a close-fought win for the Millers in what was also the final game at Nicollet Park. In 1956 the Millers moved to Metropolitan Stadium in the suburb of Bloomington.

The park also held early National Football League games as the Minneapolis Marines and Minneapolis Red Jackets played home games there during the 1920s. In 1944 the Minneapolis Millerettes of the All-American Girls Professional Baseball League called Nicollet Park home. Nicollet Park was also the place that the cereal Wheaties was first advertised. Augsburg University's football team played their home games at Nicollet from 1946 to 1950. The New York Giants and Green Bay Packers played a preseason game on August 29, 1948, at Nicollet Park.

In 1955, the ballpark closed. Currently, a condominium building with a Hennepin County Medical Center clinic is located on the north portion of the former baseball park's site, bordered by Lake Street. Until 2020, the south section of the site included a Wells Fargo Bank branch, built originally as a major branch for Norwest Bank, and an external drive-up building positioned near what was once the center field corner. On the night of May 29, 2020, during the George Floyd protests, the bank and nearby drive-up building were looted and set on fire. As of 2021, the remains of these buildings have since been demolished and plans are underway to rebuild the bank, along with an apartment complex containing at least 200 units of affordable housing. There was a plaque detailing the ballpark's history, though with the bank's demolition, it has been removed.

== Additional sources ==
- Baseball in Minnesota: The Definitive History, Minnesota Historical Society Press, 2006, by Stew Thornley.
- Before the Dome, Nodin Press, 1993, edited by David Anderson.
- On to Nicollet: The Glory and Fame of the Minneapolis Millers, Nodin Press, 1988, by Stew Thornley.
- Ballparks of North America, McFarland & Company, 1989, by Michael Benson.
- Green Cathedrals, SABR, 1986, and Addison-Wesley, 1992, by Phil Lowry.
