= Olympic Park (Buffalo) =

Baseball stadium in Buffalo, New York

Olympic Park (I)
- Interactive map of Olympic Park (I)
- Location: Buffalo, New York, U.S.
- Coordinates: 42°54′20″N 78°52′52″W
- Surface: Grass

Construction
- Opened: 1884; 142 years ago
- Demolished: 1889; 137 years ago

Tenants
- Buffalo Bisons (NL) (1884–1885); Buffalo Bisons (IL) (1886–1888)

Olympic Park (II)
- Interactive map of Olympic Park (II)
- Location: Buffalo, New York, U.S.
- Coordinates: 42°54′53″N 78°51′40″W
- Surface: Grass

Construction
- Opened: 1889; 137 years ago
- Demolished: 1923; 103 years ago

Tenants
- Buffalo Bisons (IL) (1889–1923); Buffalo Bisons (PL) (1890); Buffalo All-Americans (NFL) (1920–1923); Buffalo Prospects (NYPFL) (1919); Buffalo Niagaras (BSPFL) (1918); Buffalo All-Stars (NYPFL) (1915–1917); University at Buffalo Bisons (1894–1919)

Olympic Park is the name shared by two former baseball grounds located in Buffalo, New York, United States.

== Prelude ==
From 1878 through 1883, Buffalo's baseball teams had played at an initially unnamed ballpark at Fargo Avenue and Rhode Island Street. The club's owners named it "Riverside Park" in 1882, although it was actually over 1,000 feet (300 m) from the Niagara River. The owner of the site, Alexander Culbert, decided to develop the property and the team left the site for Olympic Park (I).

== First Olympic Park ==
Olympic Park (I) was home to the Buffalo Bisons baseball club of the National League for two seasons, 1884 and 1885. It was located on the block bounded by Richmond Avenue (west); Summer Street (south); and Norwood Avenue (east). After the National League dropped the Bisons franchise, professional baseball continued to be played there by the Buffalo Bisons of the International League, until the lease expired following the 1888 season. The last professional game in Olympic Park (I) was played on September 28, 1888, when the Buffalo Bisons played the Cuban Giants.

The site of Olympic Park (I) is currently occupied by a residential neighborhood, including the Richmond-Summer Recreation Center.

== Second Olympic Park ==
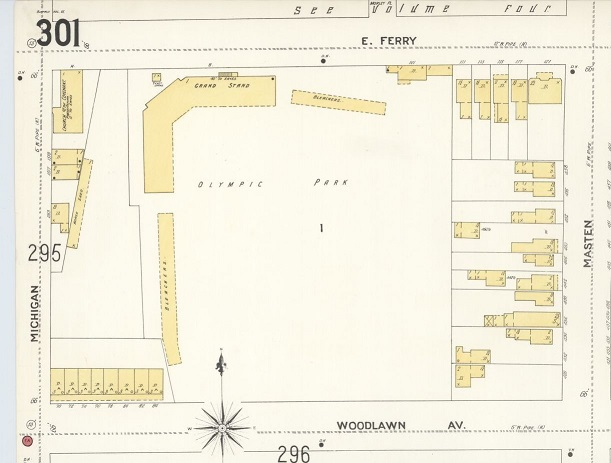
Olympic Park II from 1899 Sanborn map

The Bisons found a new location at a block bounded by East Ferry Street (north, third base); Masten Avenue (east, left field); Woodlawn Avenue (south, right field); and Michigan Avenue (west, first base). This site would remain the primary location of Buffalo professional baseball through the 1960 season. In the late winter and early spring of 1889, the club's owner had the existing (wooden) stands disassembled at the old location, and moved section by section to the new location. The club decided to continue the name because of its familiarity to the public, so it became the new Olympic Park (II).

The club held the grounds for the 1889 season, but in 1890 the Players' League version of the Bisons secured a lease on it. The minor league club had to find another location, and they played the season at grounds in the eastern part of the city, near Genesee Street and the Belt Line Railroad, which was primarily the home field of the amateur Buffalo Baseball League organization.

The Players' League folded after the 1890 season, enabling the minor league Bisons to move back to Olympic Park (II). This would be the Bisons' home stadium through the early part of the 1923 season. During the summer, they demolished the old wooden stands and began building a new set of stands in steel and concrete. It was originally named Bison Stadium, and in 1935 was renamed Offermann Stadium in memory of the club's owner.

In addition to baseball, Olympic Park (II) was also used for football, serving as the home of the Buffalo All-Americans of the National Football League, and several iterations of the New York Pro Football League Championship. The UB Bisons college football squad played its games at the stadium until 1919, after which they moved to Rotary Field on-campus.

The site of Olympic Park (II) / Offermann Stadium is currently occupied by the Buffalo Academy for Visual and Performing Arts and a church. In August 2012, a historical plaque was dedicated at the site in remembrance of over 72 years of baseball played on the grounds. Local Buffalo sports historian John Boutet spearheaded the project and raised the funds through the Facebook group Buffalo Sports Museum, the Greater Buffalo Sports Hall of Fame and the Buffalo Bisons.

== "Buffalo Baseball Park" ==
In July 1907, Bisons' owner Alexander Potter announced that the ballpark was to be renamed, from Olympic Park to Buffalo Baseball Park. This decision was not binding on news writers, and the Olympic Park name was kept alive for years, by referring to "Buffalo Baseball Park" and "Olympic Park" interchangeably, or by saying "Buffalo Baseball Park (formerly Olympic Park)". By the early 1920s, the name "Olympic Park" was fading from use. During the 1923 season, with construction on the new steel-and-concrete stadium under way, papers continuing calling it "Buffalo Baseball Park" and also "new Bison stadium", unwittingly anticipating its new name. Meanwhile, the name "Buffalo Baseball Park" continued to be used, posted on the signs above the gates, even after Bison Stadium had been renamed Offermann Stadium in 1935. "Buffalo Baseball Park" continued to appear under that name in Buffalo city directories as late as 1957.

Preceded by Riverside Park	Home of the Buffalo Bisons; 1884–1888	Succeeded by Offermann Stadium
