= Lakeside Park (Canton, Ohio) =

1920–1926 NFL stadium

- Lakeside Park
- Location: Canton, Ohio
- Operator: Canton Bulldogs
- Capacity: 7,000 (American football)
- Surface: Grass

Tenant
- Canton Bulldogs

Lakeside Park is a defunct stadium most known for being where the Canton Bulldogs played. Lakeside Park was located in Canton, Ohio. The stadium was used from 1920 until the end of the franchise in 1926.

== History ==
The park was designed as a minor league baseball stadium. The stadium was positioned on a hill in Canton Ohio, and it had a capacity of 7,000. In 1920 the Canton Bulldogs played at Lakeside Park.

In 1923 the Canton Bulldogs had an undefeated season at Lakeside Park. The team lost $13,000 during the 1923 season, so they moved north to play as the Cleveland Bulldogs. In 1924 they moved back to play at Lakeside Park and changed their name back to the Canton Bulldogs. In 1927 the Canton Bulldogs left town again and Lakeside Park no longer hosted an NFL team.
