= Horlick Field =

Football stadium and baseball park in Racine, Wisconsin, US

Horlick Athletic Field
- Horlick Field
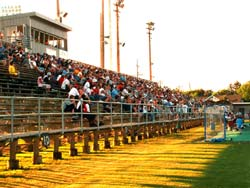
- Interactive map of Horlick Athletic Field
- Former names: North Side City League Park; City League Park; League Park
- Location: 1648 North Memorial Dr. Racine, WI 53203
- Coordinates: 42.74155°N 87.80096°W
- Owner: City of Racine
- Operator: City of Racine
- Capacity: 5,000
- Surface: Turf
- Public transit: Ryde Racine

Construction
- Opened: 1907 (Approximate) as North Side City League Park; October 19, 1919 as Horlick Athletic Field
- Cost: $250,000 Bleacher Upgrade in 2006/07
- Architect: Walter Dick

Tenants
- Racine Raiders (GDFL) (1953–present); Racine Legion (Ind.) (1919–1921); Racine Legion (NFL) (1922–1924); Racine Tornadoes (NFL) (1926); Chicago American Giants (1945); Racine Belles (AAGPBL) (1943–1950); Racine Malted Milks (WIL) (1909–1915)

Horlick Field, located on the north side of Racine, Wisconsin, in the United States, is a 5,000-seat football stadium and a baseball park enclosed within stone walls and chain fences. The land for the field was donated by William Horlick, the inventor of malted milk. It was designed in 1907 by Walter Dick, who also designed the North Beach Beach House.

Football has been a part of Horlick Field's history since 1919. It was the home for the Horlick - Racine Legion, a member of the NFL from 1922 to 1924, and the Racine Tornadoes, an NFL team in 1926. Now the Racine Raiders, a minor league team in the Mid-States Football League, call Horlick Field their home.

Teams from the high schools and local leagues play their regular season games in the baseball diamond, which is the site for local tournaments and championship games. The park has been the home of the Old Timer's Athletic Club softball tournament for over three decades. The Racine Belles, immortalized in the film A League of Their Own, called Horlick Field their home while the All-American Girls Professional Baseball League was in existence.

In 1945, the Chicago American Giants of the Negro American League hosted several games at the stadium.

Horlick Field has hosted 99 drum and bugle corps shows through 2013. Between 1962 and 1978, the stadium hosted 57 drum and bugle corps shows, an average of almost 3.5 shows a year.

== Statistics ==
- Location: 1648 North Memorial Drive, on the corner of High Street and North Memorial Drive.
- Ownership: Owned and operated by the City of Racine, Wisconsin. Concessions for all events held at Historic Horlick Field are run by the Racine Raiders Minor League Football Club.
- Playing Surface: artificial turf since 2021
