= 1924 Racine Legion season =

National Football League team season

- Owner: Racine Post of the American Legion
- Head coach: Babe Ruetz
- Home stadium: Horlick Athletic Field

Results
- Record: 4–3–3
- League place: 7th in NFL

The 1924 Horlick-Racine Legion season was their third in the National Football League (NFL) and last season as the Legion. The team finished the year with a record of 4 wins, 3 losses, and 3 ties — good for 7th place in the 18-team league

== Background ==
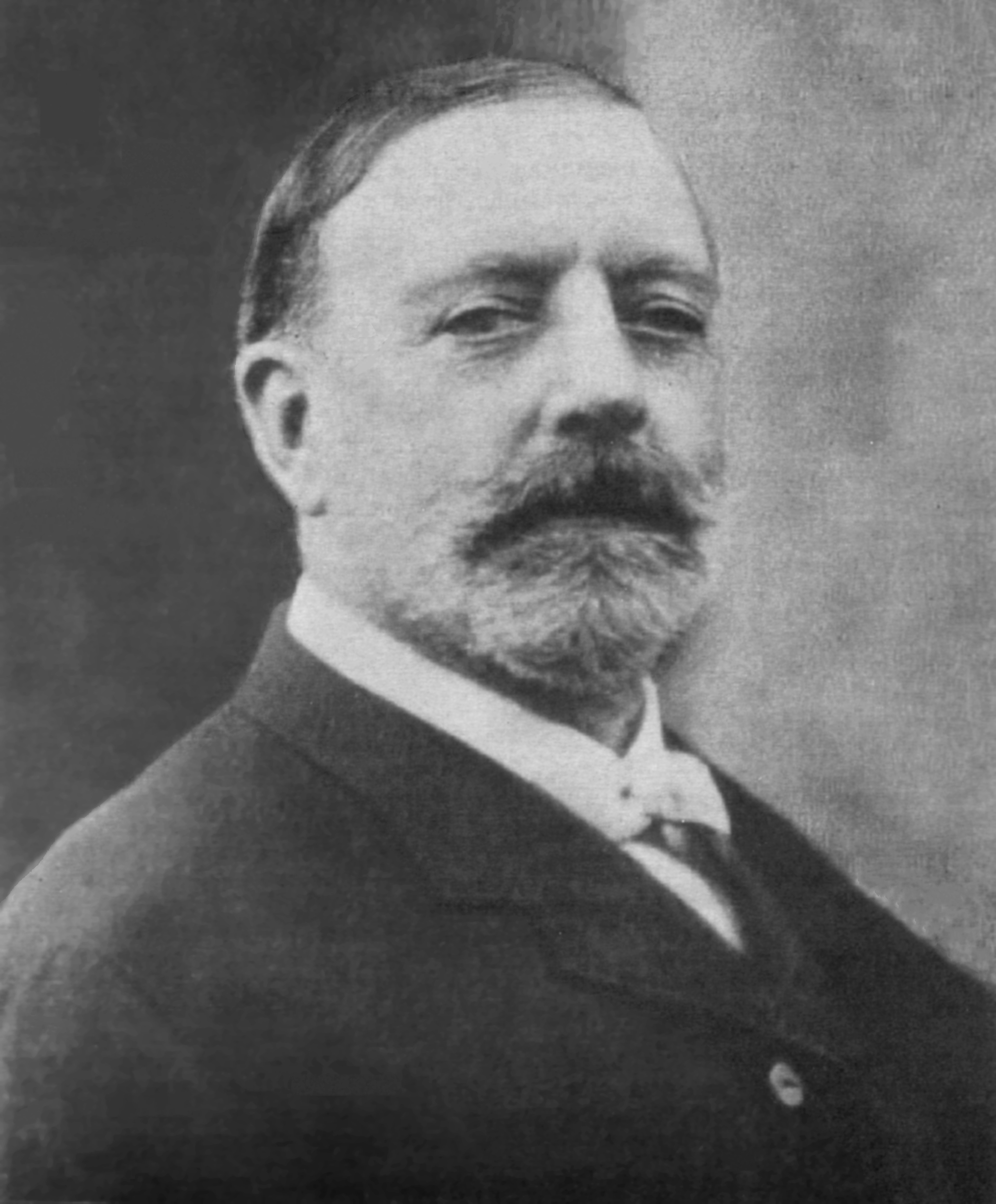
William Horlick (1846–1936), malted milk baron, sports fan, and financial angel of the Racine Legion football team.

On December 9, some 200 Racine football fans gathered to honor the 1924 Legion team and its financial angel, malted milk industrialist William Horlick. Fullback Hank Gillo was recognized as the de facto most valuable player of the squad, having scored more points for Racine in 1924 than all other team members combined. Gillo was presented with a watch in recognition of his achievement.

For his donation of use of his company's athletic field for the Legion team's use, as well as for "covering up all deficits on the financial ledger," Horlick was honored with a formal resolution of thanks and a standing ovation and three cheers from those assembled.

== Schedule ==
Game	Date	Opponent	Result	Record	Venue	Attendance	Recap	Sources
1	September 28	Hammond Pros	W 10–0	1–0	Horlick Field	3,000	Recap	
2	October 5	at Rock Island Independents	L 0–9	1–1	Douglas Park	3,500	Recap	
3	October 12	at Chicago Bears	T 10–10	1–1–1	Cubs Park	10,000	Recap	
4	October 19	Kansas City Blues	W 13–3	2–1–1	Horlick Field	"a disappointing house"	Recap	
5	October 26	at Milwaukee Badgers	W 10–0	3–1–1	Athletic Park	4,000	Recap	
6	November 2	at Green Bay Packers	L 3–6	3–2–1	Bellevue Park	4,000	Recap	
7	November 9	Rock Island Independents	L 3–6	3–3–1	Horlick Field	3,500	Recap	
8	November 16	at Chicago Bears	T 3–3	3–3–2	Cubs Park	6,500	Recap	
9	November 23	at Chicago Cardinals	T 10–10	3–3–3	Comiskey Park	4,000	Recap	
10	November 30	Green Bay Packers	W 7–0	4–3–3	Horlick Field	2,200	Recap	

== Standings ==
NFL standings
	W	L	T	PCT	PF	PA	STK
Cleveland Bulldogs	7	1	1	.875	229	60	W2
Chicago Bears	6	1	4	.857	136	55	W3
Frankford Yellow Jackets	11	2	1	.846	326	109	W8
Duluth Kelleys	5	1	0	.833	56	16	W1
Rock Island Independents	5	2	2	.714	88	38	L1
Green Bay Packers	7	4	0	.636	108	38	L1
Racine Legion	4	3	3	.571	69	47	W1
Chicago Cardinals	5	4	1	.556	90	67	L1
Buffalo Bisons	6	5	0	.545	120	140	L3
Columbus Tigers	4	4	0	.500	91	68	L1
Hammond Pros	2	2	1	.500	18	45	W2
Milwaukee Badgers	5	8	0	.385	142	188	L2
Akron Pros	2	6	0	.250	59	132	W1
Dayton Triangles	2	6	0	.250	45	148	L6
Kansas City Blues	2	7	0	.222	46	124	L2
Kenosha Maroons	0	4	1	.000	12	117	L2
Minneapolis Marines	0	6	0	.000	14	108	L6
Rochester Jeffersons	0	7	0	.000	7	156	L7

Note: Tie games were not officially counted in the standings until 1972.

== Roster ==
The following players appeared in at least one game for the Horlick-Racine Legion team in 1924. The number of NFL games in which they appeared follows each name in parentheses. No player on the 1924 Racine team has ever been inducted into the Pro Football Hall of Fame.

The team's top star was fullback and punter Hank Gillo.

Linemen

- Al Bentzin (10)
- Roman Brumm (9)
- Lee Croft (1)
- Robert "Death" Halladay (10)
- Jack Hueller (4)
- Ralph King (9)
- John Mintun (10)
- Don Murry (10)
- Riley (1)
- Fritz Roeseler (3)
- Len Smith (10)

Backs

- Shorty Barr (9)
- Al "Rowdy" Elliott (7)
- Bill Giaver (10)
- Hank Gillo - captain (10)
- Dick Hanley (1)
- Johnny Mohardt (8)
- Chuck Palmer (3)
- Milt Romney (10)
- John Thomas (2)
