= 1924 Kenosha Maroons season =

National Football League team season

- Head coach: Bo Hanley and Earl Potteiger
- Home stadium: Nash Field

Results
- Record: 0–4–1
- League place: T–16th NFL

The 1924 Kenosha Maroons season was their sole season in the National Football League. The team played its final game on November 9, abruptly ending their year a record of 0–4–1.

== Background ==
The Kenosha Maroons played their sole home game on the company athletic grounds of the Nash-Simmons Motor Company. The team's stars were halfback Dick Vick of Washington & Jefferson College and Lou Usher, a tackle who played at Syracuse.

The team's final game, played in Buffalo, New York, was reckoned at the time to have been the longest excursion ever undertaken to play a professional football game — over 1,000 miles by rail, via Chicago.

The best players from the team finished the season playing with the counterparts on the similarly shuttered Hammond Pros on Thanksgiving Day as part of a touring agglomeration known as the Kenosha All-Stars. That team lost to the Rock Island Independents in a game at Douglas Park, 10 to 6, in front of what was reckoned the smallest crowd to ever see a pro football game in that city.

== Schedule ==
Game	Date	Opponent	Result	Record	Venue	Attendance	Recap	Sources
1	October 5	at Frankford Yellow Jackets	L 6–31	0–1	Frankford Stadium	7,000	Recap	
2	October 12	at Milwaukee Badgers	L 0–21	0–2	Milwaukee Athletic Field	1,000	Recap	
3	October 19	Hammond Pros	T 6–6	0–2–1	Nash Field	600	Recap	
4	October 26	at Duluth Kelleys	L 0–32	0–3–1	Duluth Athletic Park	"fair-sized crowd"	Recap	
—	November 2	(open date)					—	
5	November 9	at Buffalo Bisons	L 0–27	0–4–1	Bison Stadium	3,500	Recap	
—	November 16	(open date)					—	
—	November 23	(open date)					—	
—	November 30	(open date)					—	

== Standings ==
NFL standings
	W	L	T	PCT	PF	PA	STK
Cleveland Bulldogs	7	1	1	.875	229	60	W2
Chicago Bears	6	1	4	.857	136	55	W3
Frankford Yellow Jackets	11	2	1	.846	326	109	W8
Duluth Kelleys	5	1	0	.833	56	16	W1
Rock Island Independents	5	2	2	.714	88	38	L1
Green Bay Packers	7	4	0	.636	108	38	L1
Racine Legion	4	3	3	.571	69	47	W1
Chicago Cardinals	5	4	1	.556	90	67	L1
Buffalo Bisons	6	5	0	.545	120	140	L3
Columbus Tigers	4	4	0	.500	91	68	L1
Hammond Pros	2	2	1	.500	18	45	W2
Milwaukee Badgers	5	8	0	.385	142	188	L2
Akron Pros	2	6	0	.250	59	132	W1
Dayton Triangles	2	6	0	.250	45	148	L6
Kansas City Blues	2	7	0	.222	46	124	L2
Kenosha Maroons	0	4	1	.000	12	117	L2
Minneapolis Marines	0	6	0	.000	14	108	L6
Rochester Jeffersons	0	7	0	.000	7	156	L7

Note: Tie games were not officially counted in the standings until 1972.

== Players ==
- Jimmy Baxter, 5'7", 173 pounds, four games
- Irv Carlson, 5'8", 170 pounds, three games at halfback, quarterback
- Walt Cassidy, 5'10", 200 pounds, five games at end
- Marty Conrad, four games
- George Dahlgren, four games
- Dick Egan, two games at end
- Earl Gorman, 225 pounds, three games at guard, tackle
- Fritz Heinisch, 5'10", 173 pounds, three games
- Bill Hurst, 6'1", 202 pounds, five games at tackle
- Ray Oberbroekling, 5'8", 198 pounds, two games at tackle
- Clete Patterson, guard
- Pard Pearce, 5'5", 150 pounds, two games at quarterback, halfback
- Earl Potteiger, 5'7", 170 pounds, three games at halfback
- George Seasholtz, 5'8", 185 pounds, five games at halfback, fullback
- Jimmy Simpson, 5'10", 160 pounds, four games at halfback, quarterback
- Dick Stahlman, 6'2" 219 pounds, five games at guard, tackle
- Lou Usher, 6'2", 240 pounds, five games at tackle, center, guard
- Dick Vick, 5'9", 167 pounds, five games at back, end
- Whitey Wolter
- Marv Wood, 6'0", 195 pounds, four games at back, end
