= Chronology of home stadiums for current NFL teams =

The following is a chronology of NFL home stadiums, that is, all home stadiums of teams currently playing in the National Football League (NFL), and their locations and capacities. It contains all past and present (in bold) home stadiums used by the current 32 members of the National Football League since 1920, along with future home stadiums presently under construction (in italics immediately above the present stadium). It is ordered by the conference and division to which the team belongs.

Soldier Field in Chicago, home of the Chicago Bears is the oldest stadium in the league having opened in 1924. The stadium that has been used the longest by an NFL team is Lambeau Field, home of the Green Bay Packers since 1957.

Stadiums represent a considerable expense to a community, and thus their construction, use, and funding often enters the public discourse. Also, given the perceived advantage a team gets from playing in their home stadium, particular attention is given in the media to the peculiarities of each stadium's environment. Weather, playing surface (either natural or artificial turf), and the presence or lack of a roof or dome all contribute to giving each team its home-field advantage.

== Home stadiums ==
**AFC**
**AFC East**
Team (former names)	Stadium (former names)	Years used	Capacity	Location
Buffalo Bills	**Highmark Stadium (2026–present)**	2026–present	63,000	Orchard Park, New York
Buffalo Bills	Highmark Stadium (2021–2025); Bills Stadium (2020–2021); New Era Field (2016–2019); Ralph Wilson Stadium (1997–2016); Rich Stadium (1973–1997)	1973–2025	71,608	Orchard Park, New York
Buffalo Bills	Rogers Centre; SkyDome (1989–2005)	2008–2013 (Bills Toronto Series)	54,000	Toronto
Buffalo Bills	War Memorial Stadium	1960–1972	46,500	Buffalo, New York
Miami Dolphins	**Hard Rock Stadium (2016–present)**; Sun Life Stadium (2010–2016); Land Shark Stadium (2009); Dolphin(s) Stadium (2005–2009); Pro Player Park/Stadium (1996–2005); Joe Robbie Stadium (1987–1996)	1987–present	65,000	Miami Gardens, Florida
Miami Dolphins	Miami Orange Bowl	1966–1986	74,476	Miami
New England Patriots (Boston Patriots)	**Gillette Stadium (2002–present)**; CMGi Field (2002)	2002–present	66,829	Foxborough, Massachusetts
New England Patriots (Boston Patriots)	Foxboro Stadium; Sullivan Stadium (1983–1989); Schaefer Stadium (1971–1982)	1971–2001	60,292	Foxborough, Massachusetts
New England Patriots (Boston Patriots)	Harvard Stadium	1970	30,898	Boston
New England Patriots (Boston Patriots)	Alumni Stadium	1969	44,500	Chestnut Hill, Massachusetts
New England Patriots (Boston Patriots)	Fenway Park	1963–1968	33,524	Boston, Massachusetts
New England Patriots (Boston Patriots)	Boston University Field	1960–1962	>9,000	Boston, Massachusetts
New York Jets (New York Titans)	**MetLife Stadium (2010–present)**; New Meadowlands Stadium (2010)	2010–present	82,500	East Rutherford, New Jersey
New York Jets (New York Titans)	Giants Stadium	1984–2009	79,469	East Rutherford, New Jersey
New York Jets (New York Titans)	Shea Stadium	1964–1983	57,800	Queens, New York
New York Jets (New York Titans)	Polo Grounds	1960–1963	55,000	Manhattan, New York
**AFC North**
Team (former names)	Stadium (former names)	Years used	Capacity	Location
Baltimore Ravens	**M&T Bank Stadium (2003–present)**; Ravens Stadium (2002); PSINet Stadium (1998–2001)	1998–present	71,008	Baltimore
Baltimore Ravens	Memorial Stadium	1996–1997	53,371	Baltimore
Cincinnati Bengals	**Paycor Stadium (2022–present)**; Paul Brown Stadium (2000–2022)	2000–present	65,515	Cincinnati
Cincinnati Bengals	Cinergy Field (1997–1999); Riverfront Stadium (1970–1996)	1970–1999	59,754	Cincinnati
Cincinnati Bengals	Nippert Stadium	1968–1969	35,000	Cincinnati
Cleveland Browns	**Huntington Bank Field (2024–present)**; FirstEnergy Stadium (2013–2022); Cleveland Browns Stadium (1999–2012, 2023–2024)	1999–present	67,895	Cleveland
Cleveland Browns	Cleveland Stadium	1946–1995	74,400	Cleveland
Pittsburgh Steelers (Pittsburgh Pirates)	**Acrisure Stadium (2022–present)**; Heinz Field (2001–2022)	2001–present	68,400	Pittsburgh
Pittsburgh Steelers (Pittsburgh Pirates)	Three Rivers Stadium	1970–2000	59,000	Pittsburgh
Pittsburgh Steelers (Pittsburgh Pirates)	Pitt Stadium	1958–1969	56,150	Pittsburgh
Pittsburgh Steelers (Pittsburgh Pirates)	Forbes Field	1933–1963	35,000	Pittsburgh
**AFC South**
Team (former names)	Stadium (former names)	Years used	Capacity	Location
Houston Texans	**Reliant Stadium** (2002–2013, 2026–present); NRG Stadium (2014–2025)	2002–present	71,500	Houston
Indianapolis Colts (Baltimore Colts)	**Lucas Oil Stadium (2008–present)**	2008–present	67,000	Indianapolis
Indianapolis Colts (Baltimore Colts)	RCA Dome (1994–2007); Hoosier Dome (1984–1993)	1984–2007	57,980	Indianapolis
Indianapolis Colts (Baltimore Colts)	Memorial Stadium	1953–1983	53,371	Baltimore, Maryland
Jacksonville Jaguars	**EverBank Stadium (2023–present)**; TIAA Bank Field (2018 - 2022); EverBank Field (2010–2017); Jacksonville Municipal Stadium (2007–2009); Alltel Stadium (1995–2006)	1995–present	67,246	Jacksonville, Florida
Tennessee Titans (Tennessee Oilers) (Houston Oilers)	**Nissan Stadium (2015–present)**; LP Field (2006–2014); The Coliseum (2002–2005); Adelphia Coliseum (1999–2001)	1999–present	67,000	Nashville, Tennessee
Tennessee Titans (Tennessee Oilers) (Houston Oilers)	Vanderbilt Stadium; Dudley Field (1922–1981)	1998	41,000	Nashville, Tennessee
Tennessee Titans (Tennessee Oilers) (Houston Oilers)	Liberty Bowl Memorial Stadium	1997	62,380	Memphis, Tennessee
Tennessee Titans (Tennessee Oilers) (Houston Oilers)	Astrodome; Reliant Astrodome (2002–2013, 2026–present); NRG Astrodome (2014–2025); Astrodome (1968–2002)	1968–1996	62,439	Houston, Texas
Tennessee Titans (Tennessee Oilers) (Houston Oilers)	Rice Stadium	1965–1967	70,000	Houston, Texas
Tennessee Titans (Tennessee Oilers) (Houston Oilers)	Jeppesen Stadium; Robertson Stadium (1980–2012)	1960–1964	32,000	Houston, Texas
**AFC West**
Team (former names)	Stadium (former names)	Years used	Capacity	Location
Denver Broncos	**Empower Field at Mile High (2019–present)**; Broncos Stadium at Mile High (2018); Sports Authority Field at Mile High (2011–2017); INVESCO Field at Mile High (2001–2010)	2001–present	76,125	Denver
Denver Broncos	Mile High Stadium; Bears Stadium (1960–1968)	1960–2000	76,273	Denver
Kansas City Chiefs (Dallas Texans)	**GEHA Field at Arrowhead Stadium (2021–present)**; Arrowhead Stadium (1972–2020)	1972–present	79,409	Kansas City, Missouri
Kansas City Chiefs (Dallas Texans)	Municipal Stadium	1963–1971	47,500	Kansas City, Missouri
Kansas City Chiefs (Dallas Texans)	Cotton Bowl	1960–1962	68,252	Dallas
Las Vegas Raiders (Oakland Raiders) (Los Angeles Raiders)	**Allegiant Stadium (2020–present)**	2020–present	65,000	Paradise, Nevada
Las Vegas Raiders (Oakland Raiders) (Los Angeles Raiders)	Oakland Coliseum; RingCentral Coliseum (2019); Oakland-Alameda County Coliseum (1960–1997, 2008–2010, 2016–2018); O.co Coliseum (2011–2015); McAfee Coliseum (2005–2007); Network Associates Coliseum (1998–2004)	1995–2019; 1966–1981	63,146	Oakland, California
Las Vegas Raiders (Oakland Raiders) (Los Angeles Raiders)	Los Angeles Memorial Coliseum	1982–1994	101,574	Los Angeles
Las Vegas Raiders (Oakland Raiders) (Los Angeles Raiders)	Frank Youell Field	1962–1965	22,000	Oakland, California
Las Vegas Raiders (Oakland Raiders) (Los Angeles Raiders)	Candlestick Park; Monster Park (2004–2008); San Francisco Stadium at Candlestick Point (2003–2004); 3Com Park (1995–2002); Candlestick Park (1960–1994, 2008–2013)	1960–1961	UNK (currently 64,450)	San Francisco, California
Las Vegas Raiders (Oakland Raiders) (Los Angeles Raiders)	Kezar Stadium	1960	59,942	San Francisco, California
Los Angeles Chargers (San Diego Chargers)	**SoFi Stadium (2020–present)**	2020–present	70,000	Inglewood, California
Los Angeles Chargers (San Diego Chargers)	Dignity Health Sports Park (2019); StubHub Center (2017–2018); The Home Depot Center (2003–2013)	2017–2019	30,000	Carson, California
Los Angeles Chargers (San Diego Chargers)	San Diego Stadium; SDCCU Stadium (2017–2020); Qualcomm Stadium (1992–2016); Jack Murphy Stadium (1980–1992); San Diego Stadium (1967–1980)	1967–2016	71,294	San Diego
Los Angeles Chargers (San Diego Chargers)	Balboa Stadium	1961–1966	34,000	San Diego
Los Angeles Chargers (San Diego Chargers)	Los Angeles Memorial Coliseum	1960	101,574	Los Angeles, California
**NFC**
**NFC East**
Team (former names)	Stadium (former names)	Years Used	Capacity	Location
Dallas Cowboys	**AT&T Stadium (2013–present)**; Cowboys Stadium (2009–2013)	2009–present	80,000–100,000	Arlington, Texas
Dallas Cowboys	Texas Stadium	1971–2008	65,675	Irving, Texas
Dallas Cowboys	Cotton Bowl	1960–1971	68,252	Dallas, Texas
New York Giants	**MetLife Stadium (2010–present)**; New Meadowlands Stadium (2010)	2010–present	82,500	East Rutherford, New Jersey
New York Giants	Giants Stadium	1976–2009	79,469	East Rutherford, New Jersey
New York Giants	Shea Stadium	1975	57,800	Queens, New York
New York Giants	Yale Bowl	1973–1974	64,269	New Haven, Connecticut
New York Giants	Yankee Stadium	1956–1973	67,000	The Bronx, New York
New York Giants	Polo Grounds	1925–1955	55,000	Manhattan, New York
Philadelphia Eagles	**Lincoln Financial Field (2003–present)**	2003–present	68,500	Philadelphia
Philadelphia Eagles	Veterans Stadium	1971–2002	65,386	Philadelphia
Philadelphia Eagles	Franklin Field	1958–1970	52,593	Philadelphia
Philadelphia Eagles	Connie Mack Stadium; Shibe Park (1909–1953)	1942–1957; 1940	23,000	Philadelphia
Philadelphia Eagles	John F. Kennedy Stadium; Philadelphia Municipal Stadium (1927–1963); Sesquicentennial Stadium (1926)	1941; 1936–1939	75,000	Philadelphia
Philadelphia Eagles	Baker Bowl; Philadelphia Base Ball Grounds (1887–1895); National League Park (1895–1913)	1933–1935	20,000	Philadelphia
Washington Commanders (Washington Redskins) (Washington Football Team) (Boston Redskins) (Boston Braves)	New Stadium at RFK Campus	c. 2030	65,000	Washington, D.C.
Washington Commanders (Washington Redskins) (Washington Football Team) (Boston Redskins) (Boston Braves)	**Northwest Stadium (2024–present)**; FedExField (1999–2023); Jack Kent Cooke Stadium (1997–1999)	1997–present	64,000	Landover, Maryland
Washington Commanders (Washington Redskins) (Washington Football Team) (Boston Redskins) (Boston Braves)	RFK Stadium; D.C. Stadium (1961–1968)	1961–1996	55,672	Washington, D.C.
Washington Commanders (Washington Redskins) (Washington Football Team) (Boston Redskins) (Boston Braves)	Griffith Stadium; National Park (1911–1920)	1937–1960	32,000	Washington, D.C.
Washington Commanders (Washington Redskins) (Washington Football Team) (Boston Redskins) (Boston Braves)	Fenway Park	1933–1936	33,524	Boston, Massachusetts
Washington Commanders (Washington Redskins) (Washington Football Team) (Boston Redskins) (Boston Braves)	Braves Field; National League Park (1936–1941)	1932	40,000	Boston, Massachusetts
**NFC North**
Team (former names)	Stadium (former names)	Years Used	Capacity	Location
Chicago Bears (Chicago Staleys) (Decatur Staleys)	**Soldier Field (2003–present)**	2003–present	63,000	Chicago
Chicago Bears (Chicago Staleys) (Decatur Staleys)	Memorial Stadium	2002	69,249	Champaign, Illinois
Chicago Bears (Chicago Staleys) (Decatur Staleys)	Soldier Field; Municipal Grant Park Stadium (1924–1925)	1971–2001	61,500	Chicago, Illinois
Chicago Bears (Chicago Staleys) (Decatur Staleys)	Wrigley Field	1921–1970	40,000	Chicago, Illinois
Chicago Bears (Chicago Staleys) (Decatur Staleys)	Staley Field	1920	1,500	Decatur, Illinois
Detroit Lions (Portsmouth Spartans)	**Ford Field (2002–present)**	2002–present	65,000	Detroit
Detroit Lions (Portsmouth Spartans)	Pontiac Silverdome	1975–2001	80,311	Pontiac, Michigan
Detroit Lions (Portsmouth Spartans)	Tiger Stadium; Briggs Stadium (1938–1960)	1938–1974	52,416	Detroit, Michigan
Detroit Lions (Portsmouth Spartans)	University of Detroit Stadium	1934–1937	25,000	Detroit, Michigan
Detroit Lions (Portsmouth Spartans)	Universal Stadium; Spartan Municipal Stadium (1970–present)	1930–1933	8,200	Portsmouth, Ohio
Green Bay Packers	**Lambeau Field (1957–present)**; New City Stadium (1957–1965)	1957–present	81,435	Green Bay, Wisconsin
Green Bay Packers	Milwaukee County Stadium	1953–1994 (2–4 games yearly)	53,192	Milwaukee
Green Bay Packers	Marquette Stadium	1952 (3 games)	15,000	Milwaukee
Green Bay Packers	Wisconsin State Fair Park	1934–1951 (2–3 games yearly)	UNK	Milwaukee
Green Bay Packers	Borchert Field	1933 (1 game)	13,000	Milwaukee
Green Bay Packers	City Stadium	1926–1956	25,000	Green Bay, Wisconsin
Green Bay Packers	Bellevue Park	1923–1925	4,000–5,000	Green Bay, Wisconsin
Green Bay Packers	Hagemeister Park	1919–1922	UNK	Green Bay, Wisconsin
Minnesota Vikings	**U.S. Bank Stadium (2016–present)**	2016–present	65,400	Minneapolis
Minnesota Vikings	TCF Bank Stadium	2014–2015	50,805	Minneapolis
Minnesota Vikings	Hubert H. Humphrey Metrodome	1982–2013	64,035	Minneapolis
Minnesota Vikings	Metropolitan Stadium	1961–1981	45,919	Bloomington, Minnesota
**NFC South**
Team (former names)	Stadium (former names)	Years used	Capacity	Location
Atlanta Falcons	**Mercedes-Benz Stadium (2017–present)**	2017–present	71,000	Atlanta
Atlanta Falcons	Georgia Dome	1992–2016	71,149	Atlanta
Atlanta Falcons	Atlanta–Fulton County Stadium	1966–1991	62,000	Atlanta
Carolina Panthers	**Bank of America Stadium (2004–present)**; Ericsson Stadium (1996–2003); Carolinas Stadium (1995)	1996–present	73,779	Charlotte, North Carolina
Carolina Panthers	Frank Howard Field at Memorial Stadium	1995	80,301	Clemson, South Carolina
New Orleans Saints	**Caesars Superdome (2021–present)**; Mercedes-Benz Superdome (2011–2020); Louisiana Superdome (1975–2010)	2006–present 1975–2004	76,468	New Orleans
New Orleans Saints	Tiger Stadium	Four games in 2005	92,400	Baton Rouge, Louisiana
New Orleans Saints	Alamodome	Three games in 2005	65,000	San Antonio, Texas
New Orleans Saints	Giants Stadium	One game in 2005	79,469	East Rutherford, New Jersey
New Orleans Saints	Tulane Stadium	1967–1974	80,985	New Orleans, Louisiana
Tampa Bay Buccaneers	**Raymond James Stadium (1998–present)**	1998–present	65,657	Tampa, Florida
Tampa Bay Buccaneers	Tampa Stadium; Houlihan's Stadium (1996–1997); Tampa Stadium (1976–1995)	1976–1997	74,301	Tampa, Florida
**NFC West**
Team (former names)	Stadium (former names)	Years used	Capacity	Location
Arizona Cardinals (Phoenix Cardinals) (St. Louis Cardinals) (Chicago Cardinals) (Racine Cardinals) (Racine Normals) (Morgan Athletic Club)	**State Farm Stadium (2018–present)**; University of Phoenix Stadium (2006–2017)	2006–present	63,000	Glendale, Arizona
Arizona Cardinals (Phoenix Cardinals) (St. Louis Cardinals) (Chicago Cardinals) (Racine Cardinals) (Racine Normals) (Morgan Athletic Club)	Sun Devil Stadium	1988–2005	73,379	Tempe, Arizona
Arizona Cardinals (Phoenix Cardinals) (St. Louis Cardinals) (Chicago Cardinals) (Racine Cardinals) (Racine Normals) (Morgan Athletic Club)	Busch Stadium (II)	1966–1987	49,676	St. Louis, Missouri
Arizona Cardinals (Phoenix Cardinals) (St. Louis Cardinals) (Chicago Cardinals) (Racine Cardinals) (Racine Normals) (Morgan Athletic Club)	Busch Stadium (I)	1960–1965	30,500	St. Louis, Missouri
Arizona Cardinals (Phoenix Cardinals) (St. Louis Cardinals) (Chicago Cardinals) (Racine Cardinals) (Racine Normals) (Morgan Athletic Club)	Metropolitan Stadium	1959 (2 games)	18,600	Bloomington, Minnesota
Arizona Cardinals (Phoenix Cardinals) (St. Louis Cardinals) (Chicago Cardinals) (Racine Cardinals) (Racine Normals) (Morgan Athletic Club)	Soldier Field; Municipal Grant Park Stadium (1924–1925)	1959 (4 games)	61,500	Chicago, Illinois
Arizona Cardinals (Phoenix Cardinals) (St. Louis Cardinals) (Chicago Cardinals) (Racine Cardinals) (Racine Normals) (Morgan Athletic Club)	Comiskey Park	1929–1958; 1922–1925	52,000	Chicago, Illinois
Arizona Cardinals (Phoenix Cardinals) (St. Louis Cardinals) (Chicago Cardinals) (Racine Cardinals) (Racine Normals) (Morgan Athletic Club)	Normal Park	1926–1928; 1920–1921	UNK	Chicago, Illinois
Los Angeles Rams (St. Louis Rams) (Cleveland Rams)	**SoFi Stadium (2020–present)**	2020–present	70,000	Inglewood, California
Los Angeles Rams (St. Louis Rams) (Cleveland Rams)	Los Angeles Memorial Coliseum	2016–2019; 1946–1979	93,607	Los Angeles, California
Los Angeles Rams (St. Louis Rams) (Cleveland Rams)	Edward Jones Dome; Trans World Dome (1995–2001); The Dome at America's Center (2001–2002, 2016–present)	1995–2015	66,000	St. Louis, Missouri
Los Angeles Rams (St. Louis Rams) (Cleveland Rams)	Busch Stadium (II)	1995	49,676	St. Louis, Missouri
Los Angeles Rams (St. Louis Rams) (Cleveland Rams)	Anaheim Stadium	1980–1994	64,593	Anaheim, California
Los Angeles Rams (St. Louis Rams) (Cleveland Rams)	League Park	1944–1945; 1942; 1937	21,414	Cleveland, Ohio
Los Angeles Rams (St. Louis Rams) (Cleveland Rams)	Cleveland Stadium	1939–1941; 1937	78,000	Cleveland, Ohio
Los Angeles Rams (St. Louis Rams) (Cleveland Rams)	Shaw Stadium	1938	UNK	Cleveland, Ohio
San Francisco 49ers	**Levi's Stadium** (2014–present)	2014–present	68,983	Santa Clara, California
San Francisco 49ers	Candlestick Park; Monster Park (2005–2008); **3Com Park** (1995–2004); Candlestick Park (1960–1994, 2008–2013)	1971–2013	64,450	San Francisco, California
San Francisco 49ers	Kezar Stadium	1946–1970	59,942	San Francisco, California
Seattle Seahawks	**Lumen Field** (2020–present); CenturyLink Field (2011–2019); Qwest Field (2004–2011); Seahawks Stadium (2002–2003)	2002–present	68,000	Seattle
Seattle Seahawks	Husky Stadium	2000–2001; Three games in 1994	72,500	Seattle
Seattle Seahawks	Kingdome	1976–1999	66,000	Seattle

== Temporary home stadiums ==
Occasionally, a team's home games are moved from their usual site to another location, usually either due to natural disasters, or to the stadium being in use for other events. The list of temporary home stadiums is ordered by the date on which the game using the temporary location was played.

Date played	Stadium	Visiting team	Home team	Rationale
October 10, 1921	Staley Field	Rock Island Independents	Chicago Staleys	Although the Staleys moved from Decatur, Illinois to Chicago prior to the 1921 season, they decided to play a home game in their old city and stadium.
December 18, 1932	Chicago Stadium	Portsmouth Spartans	Chicago Bears	The 1932 NFL playoff game was moved indoors because of severe blizzards in Chicago.
September 22, 1968	Legion Field, Birmingham, Ala.	New York Jets	Boston Patriots	Boston Red Sox refused to rent Fenway Park to Boston Patriots until American League Championship Series and, if necessary, World Series concluded.
October 5, 1969	Grant Field	Baltimore Colts	Atlanta Falcons	A baseball playoff game hosted by the Atlanta Braves forced the Falcons to move their contest from Fulton County Stadium.
October 5, 1969	Memorial Stadium	Green Bay Packers	Minnesota Vikings	A baseball playoff game hosted by the Minnesota Twins forced the Vikings to move their contest from Metropolitan Stadium.
September 27, 1970	Dyche Stadium	Philadelphia Eagles	Chicago Bears	As part of a trial run. In 1970, the NFL ruled that all teams must play in stadiums that seated more than 50,000 fans, and the Bears were forced to leave Wrigley Field. Ultimately, a deal to play permanently at Dyche Stadium fell through, forcing the Bears to return to Wrigley for the remainder of the 1970 season. The team moved to Soldier Field in 1971.
September 23, 1973	California Memorial Stadium	Miami Dolphins	Oakland Raiders	The Raiders moved their game from the Oakland Coliseum to accommodate a larger crowd to see the defending Super Bowl VII champion Dolphins.
October 22, 1989	Stanford Stadium	New England Patriots	San Francisco 49ers	Candlestick Park, the then-home of the 49ers, was damaged by the Loma Prieta earthquake.
October 27, 2003	Sun Devil Stadium	Miami Dolphins	San Diego Chargers	Qualcomm Stadium was being used as a major evacuation site during the Cedar Fire.
September 19, 2005	Giants Stadium	New York Giants	New Orleans Saints	Hurricane Katrina forced the Saints out of New Orleans. The NFL decided that the Saints' first regularly scheduled home game against the Giants be played in New Jersey, with the Saints the home team in name only. For the rest of the season, the Saints played three games at the Alamodome and four games at LSU's Tiger Stadium (LSU) (see above).
December 13, 2010	Ford Field	New York Giants	Minnesota Vikings	The Metrodome suffered severe damage on December 12 during a blizzard, in which the weight of the snow accumulated on its Teflon-coated roof tore it open. Because of the short notice, the game between the Giants and the Vikings was moved to Detroit's Ford Field, in part because the Giants did not pack any cold weather gear on their trip, expecting to play indoors, and because Fox Sports was able to keep all their broadcast equipment in place after the Packers/Lions game the day before. Because it would take longer than a week to repair the Metrodome, the Vikings' next home game against the Bears was instead held locally outdoors at TCF Bank Stadium.
December 20, 2010	TCF Bank Stadium	Chicago Bears	Minnesota Vikings	
November 24, 2014	Ford Field	New York Jets	Buffalo Bills	A massive blizzard in western New York forced the game to be moved from Buffalo's Ralph Wilson Stadium to Detroit, and postponed from Sunday to Monday night.
December 7, 2020	State Farm Stadium	Buffalo Bills	San Francisco 49ers	On November 30, Santa Clara County imposed a ban on all contact sports for three weeks due to rising COVID-19 cases. As a result, the 49ers were forced to play home games and practice from out-of-county, away from Levi's Stadium. The team used Arizona's State Farm Stadium as a temporary venue for Weeks 13 and 14. After the ban on contact sports was extended thru January 8, the 49ers announced that their Week 17 regular season finale against the Seattle Seahawks would be played in Arizona as well.
December 13, 2020	State Farm Stadium	Washington Football Team	San Francisco 49ers	
January 3, 2021	State Farm Stadium	Seattle Seahawks	San Francisco 49ers	
September 12, 2021	TIAA Bank Field	Green Bay Packers	New Orleans Saints	Hurricane Ida severely damaged New Orleans, including major damage to electric transmission lines causing nearly all of the city to lose power; restoration of power was expected to take weeks. The Saints used Jacksonville's TIAA Bank Field for its Week 1 matchup against the Packers.
November 20, 2022	Ford Field	Cleveland Browns	Buffalo Bills	A massive blizzard in western New York forced the game to be moved from Buffalo's Highmark Stadium to Detroit.

== See also ==
- List of current NFL stadiums
- Stadiums to host the Super Bowl (including future years)
- Stadiums that have hosted the Pro Bowl
- List of NCAA Division I FBS football stadiums
- List of NCAA Division I FCS football stadiums
- List of American football stadiums by capacity
- List of U.S. stadiums by capacity
- List of North American stadiums by capacity
- List of Canadian Football League stadiums
- List of Major League Baseball stadiums
- List of Major League Soccer stadiums
- List of Major League Lacrosse stadiums
- List of National Basketball Association arenas
- List of National Hockey League arenas
