= 1924 NFL season =

American football season

Regular season
- Duration: September 27-November 30, 1924
- Champions: Cleveland Bulldogs

NFL teams

The 1924 NFL season was the fifth regular season of the National Football League. The league had 18 teams play during the season, including the new clubs Frankford Yellow Jackets, Kansas City Blues, and Kenosha Maroons. The Louisville Brecks, Oorang Indians, and Toledo Maroons folded.

Before the season, the owner of the now-defunct Cleveland Indians bought the Canton Bulldogs and "mothballed" it, taking the team's nickname and players to Cleveland for the season. Amidst controversy, the new team, the Cleveland Bulldogs, won the 1924 NFL title with a 7–1–1 record.

== Background ==
=== January league meeting ===
Team owners and representatives held their annual scheduling meeting at the Hotel Sherman in Chicago during the weekend of January 26–27, 1924. Representatives from twenty teams were in attendance, including a delegate from Kansas City requesting admission into the league. Joe F. Carr of Columbus was reelected as president, with John Dunn of Minneapolis chosen vice-president. Carl Storck of Dayton was selected as the league's secretary-treasurer.

In at attempt to reduce costs for small market teams and equalize the competitive playing field, Curly Lambeau of the Green Bay Packers and George "Babe" Ruetz of the Racine Legion made proposals to radically restructure the way the NFL conducted its operations. Lambeau proposed that instead of allowing each team to schedule its own games — a system which allowed big-market teams such as the Chicago Bears to play most of their games at home against chosen opponents — the league should instead take over scheduling as an equalizing measure.

George "Babe" Ruetz, player-coach of the Racine Legion.

Ruetz proposed splitting the league into two divisions — Eastern and Western — with the latter to include the two Chicago teams and neighboring Hammond, Indiana; Rock Island, Illinois; St. Louis; and the northwestern teams of Minneapolis, Green Bay, Milwaukee, and Racine, Wisconsin. A slate of 9 games was proposed, followed by a league championship game pitting the winner of the East against the winner of the West. This division of the NFL into geographic sections would have the chief benefit of reducing travel costs and expenses for small-market clubs, allowing them a better chance of financial survival.

These proposals were defeated by vote of the owners, however, with most clubs favoring the certainty of the status quo over a fundamental restructuring of the league. News reports indicated there would be some change in scheduling for 1924, however, with the first five weeks to be dedicated to regional matchups and the final four weeks to intersectional games. It was hoped that improved competitive balance would result.

Representatives from the professional football clubs of Hibbing, Minnesota, and Ironwood, Michigan were said to be sending representatives to the Chicago meeting in an effort to obtain league franchises. While neither of these small town clubs were able to satisfy team owners in the league of their viability, Kansas City was admitted for 1924.

The league meeting presented gold footballs to members of the 1923 Canton Bulldogs for winning the league championship.

An appeal was heard by the delegates, presented by the Rock Island Independents, over the guarantee paid in 1923 to the Rochester Jeffersons for their October 14 game. The Jeffs, it was alleged, misrepresented their lineup and breached their contract by failing to bring in regular players for a competitive game. The visiting substitutes had been blasted 56–0 by the Islanders in one of the most one-sided games of the 1923 season. This dispute was decided in favor of Rochester, however, and the team was awarded its guarantee.

== Teams ==
Eighteen teams competed in the NFL during the 1924 season, with four financially failing teams from 1923 failing to return — the Toledo Maroons, St. Louis All-Stars, Louisville Brecks, and the Oorang Indians of Marion, Ohio.

First season in NFL	Last season before hiatus, rejoined later
First and only season in NFL

Team	Head coach(es)	Stadium
Akron Pros	Wayne Brenkert	Akron League Park
Buffalo Bisons	Tommy Hughitt	Bison Stadium
Chicago Bears	George Halas	Cubs Park
Chicago Cardinals	Arnie Horween	Comiskey Park
Cleveland Bulldogs	Guy Chamberlin	Dunn Field
Columbus Tigers	Red Weaver	West Side Athletic Club
Dayton Triangles	Carl Storck	Triangle Park
Duluth Kelleys	Dewey Scanlon	Duluth Athletic Park
Frankford Yellow Jackets	Punk Berryman	Frankford Stadium
Green Bay Packers	Curly Lambeau	Bellevue Park
Hammond Pros	Wally Hess	Traveling team
Kansas City Blues	LeRoy Andrews	Traveling team
Kenosha Maroons	Bo Hanley and Earl Potteiger	Nash Field
Milwaukee Badgers	Hal Erickson	Milwaukee Athletic Park
Minneapolis Marines	Joe Brandy	Nicollet Park
Racine Legion	Babe Ruetz	Horlick Field
Rochester Jeffersons	Leo Lyons (3 games); Johnny Murphy (4 games)	Edgerton Park
Rock Island Independents	Johnny Armstrong	Douglas Park

== Standings ==
NFL standings
	W	L	T	PCT	PF	PA	STK
Cleveland Bulldogs	7	1	1	.875	229	60	W2
Chicago Bears	6	1	4	.857	136	55	W3
Frankford Yellow Jackets	11	2	1	.846	326	109	W8
Duluth Kelleys	5	1	0	.833	56	16	W1
Rock Island Independents	5	2	2	.714	88	38	L1
Green Bay Packers	7	4	0	.636	108	38	L1
Racine Legion	4	3	3	.571	69	47	W1
Chicago Cardinals	5	4	1	.556	90	67	L1
Buffalo Bisons	6	5	0	.545	120	140	L3
Columbus Tigers	4	4	0	.500	91	68	L1
Hammond Pros	2	2	1	.500	18	45	W2
Milwaukee Badgers	5	8	0	.385	142	188	L2
Akron Pros	2	6	0	.250	59	132	W1
Dayton Triangles	2	6	0	.250	45	148	L6
Kansas City Blues	2	7	0	.222	46	124	L2
Kenosha Maroons	0	4	1	.000	12	117	L2
Minneapolis Marines	0	6	0	.000	14	108	L6
Rochester Jeffersons	0	7	0	.000	7	156	L7

Note: Tie games were not officially counted in the standings until 1972.

== Championship race ==
The Cleveland Bulldogs, Buffalo Bisons, Frankford Yellow Jackets, Green Bay Packers and Chicago Bears were the contenders for the title in November.

However, Buffalo faltered down the stretch, dropping their last three games to drop from 6–2 to 6–5, finishing squarely in the middle of the pack, and Green Bay similarly fell from 6–2 to 7–4. This left Cleveland and Chicago to contend for the title, since Frankford had two losses and the other two teams only one. Teams such as the Duluth Kelleys and the Rock Island Independents would have been contenders for the title, but their more limited schedules (six games for Duluth and nine for Rock Island) effectively ruled them out of title contention.

The official end of the season was designated on November 30, 1924, with Cleveland atop the league standings. After this date, Chicago challenged Cleveland to a post-season rematch and won, setting up a repeat of 1921, when the Bears (at that time still known as the Staleys) were able to win the championship from Buffalo (at the time known as the All-Americans) using the same tactic: this time, however, league officials declared any game after November 30 to be effectively exhibition games, null and void with regard to the season standings, which allowed the Bulldogs to keep their title. The Bears argued that the Bulldogs had agreed in advance that the game will be the title match, but the NFL officials claimed the Bulldogs couldn't make the decision for the league, and awarded them the title based on "league play".

In terms of pure win–loss differential, the Yellow Jackets would have easily won the title, as they had nine more wins than losses, compared to the +6 of the Bulldogs and the +5 of the Bears.

Had the current (post-1972) system of counting ties as half-a-win and half-a-loss been in force in 1924, the Kelleys (5–1) would have tied with the Bulldogs (7–1–1) for the league title at .833, with the tiebreaker not applicable as the Kelleys and Bulldogs did not play each other, while the Yellow Jackets (11–2–1) would have finished third at .821, with the Bears (6–1–4) finishing fourth at .727.
