= List of Green Bay Packers stadiums =

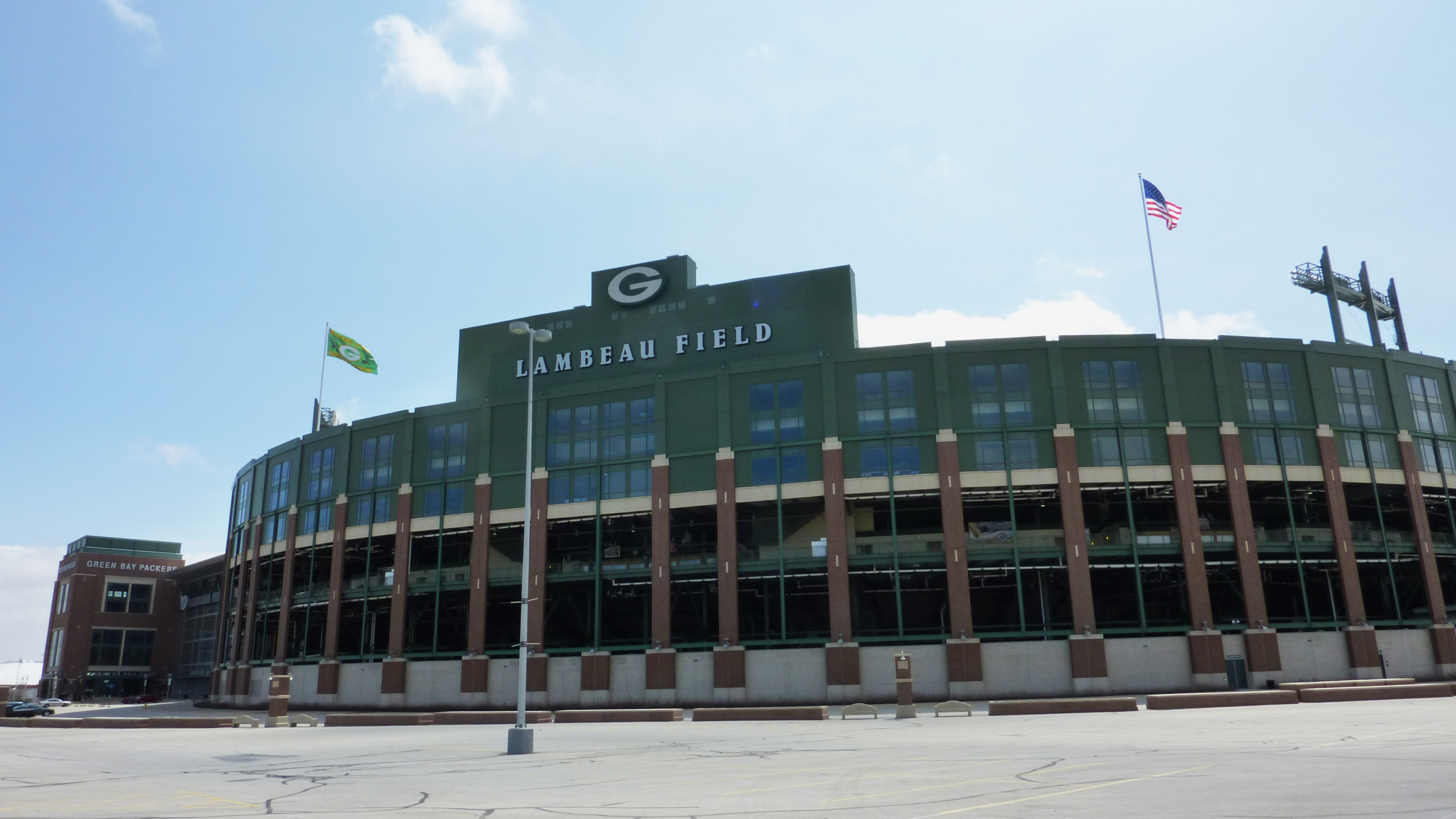
Lambeau Field, the current home of the Green Bay Packers

The Green Bay Packers are a professional American football team based in Green Bay, Wisconsin. Since their establishment as a professional football team in 1919, the Packers have played home games in eight stadiums. Their first home was Hagemeister Park, where they played from 1919 to 1922, including their first two seasons in the National Football League (NFL). Hagemeister Park was a park owned by the Hagemeister Brewery. During games ropes were set up around the field and attendees either walked up or parked their cars nearby. After the first season, a small grandstand was built and the field was fenced off. Green Bay East High School was built at the location of Hagemeister Park in 1922, which forced the Packers to move to Bellevue Park, a small local baseball stadium that seated about 5,000. They only played for two seasons at Bellevue Park before moving to City Stadium in 1925. Although City Stadium was the Packers' official home field, in 1933 they began to play some of their home games in Milwaukee to attract more fans and revenue. After hosting one game at Borchert Field in 1933, the Packers played two or three home games each year in Milwaukee, at Wisconsin State Fair Park from 1934 to 1951 and at Marquette Stadium in 1952. The games were moved to Milwaukee County Stadium after it opened in 1953 and continued through 1994, after which the Packers moved back to Green Bay permanently.

The current home of the Green Bay Packers is Lambeau Field, an 81,441 seating capacity stadium in Green Bay, Wisconsin. By the 1950s, City Stadium was seen by the NFL as too small and outdated to host an NFL team. After the NFL threatened to force the team to move to Milwaukee, the City of Green Bay built New City Stadium, which was funded by a voter-approved bond issue, in 1957. In April 1956, Green Bay voters overwhelmingly approved the bond issue to finance the new stadium. After the Packers' founder Curly Lambeau died in 1965, the stadium was renamed to Lambeau Field in his honor. Its original capacity was 32,500 seats, although it was continually expanded from 1961 to 1995 to a capacity of 60,890 seats. The stadium was further renovated from 2001 to 2003 to increase capacity to 72,515, while also updating various aspects of the stadium. Over 7,000 more seats were added to the south endzone in 2013 and the Lambeau Field Atrium was expanded in 2015. These renovations increased the stadium's capacity to 81,441, making it one of the largest football stadiums by capacity in the United States. Lambeau Field has been continuously ranked as one of the best stadiums in the NFL. As of 2024, it is also the oldest continually operating NFL stadium. Only the Boston Red Sox at Fenway Park and the Chicago Cubs at Wrigley Field have longer active home-field tenures in American professional sports.

== Stadiums ==
Green Bay Packers stadiums
| Image | Stadium | Location | Capacity (seats) | Duration | Coordinates | Refs. |
|---|---|---|---|---|---|---|
| Black and white photo of football players on a field | Hagemeister Park | Green Bay, Wisconsin | 3,500 | 1919–1922 | 44°30′25″N 87°59′33″W | |
| Black and white photo of a crowd looking at a field in front of a building that says Bellevue | Bellevue Park | Green Bay, Wisconsin | 4,000 to 5,000 | 1923–1924 | 44°30′15″N 87°59′2″W | |
| Postcard showing an aerial view of City Stadium | City Stadium | Green Bay, Wisconsin | 25,000 | 1925–1956 | 44°30′27″N 87°59′33″W | |
| Postcard showing a crowd outside of Borchert Field | Borchert Field | Milwaukee, Wisconsin | 13,000 | 1933 | 43°4′26″N 87°55′14″W | |
| Aerial view of Wisconsin State Fair Park | Wisconsin State Fair Park | West Allis, Wisconsin | 34,000 | 1934–1951 | 43°1′19″N 88°0′46″W | |
| Black and white photo of empty stands of Marquette Stadium | Marquette Stadium | Milwaukee, Wisconsin | 21,000 | 1952 | 43°2′10″N 87°57′40″W | |
| The side of the facility with the words Milwaukee County Stadium | Milwaukee County Stadium | Milwaukee, Wisconsin | 35,646 | 1953–1994 | 43°1′48″N 87°58′27″W | |
| View of the side of Lambeau Field from the parking lot | Lambeau Field | Green Bay, Wisconsin | 81,441 | 1957–Present | 44°30′5″N 88°3′44″W | |

== Training facilities ==
In addition to Lambeau Field, the Green Bay Packers operate three separate training facilities that are part of a large complex located across the street from the stadium:

Green Bay Packers training facilities
| Image | Facility | Location | Opened | Coordinates | Refs. |
|---|---|---|---|---|---|
| Black and white photo of football players on a field | Clarke Hinkle Field | Ashwaubenon, Wisconsin | 1958 | 44°29′54″N 88°3′30″W | |
| Postcard showing an aerial view of City Stadium | Don Hutson Center | Ashwaubenon, Wisconsin | 1994 | 44°29′54″N 88°3′27″W | |
| Black and white photo of a crowd looking at a field in front of a building that says Bellevue | Ray Nitschke Field | Ashwaubenon, Wisconsin | 1997 | 44°29′52″N 88°3′24″W | |

Prior to their current training facilities, the Packers practiced at Rockwood Lodge between 1946 and 1949. The lodge, according to ESPN, is believed to have been the first self-contained team training facility in professional football history, although it burned down in 1950 under suspicious circumstances, just one week before Curly Lambeau resigned from the Packers. From 1958 to 2019, the Packers hosted their yearly training camp at St. Norbert College, a private Catholic liberal arts college in De Pere, Wisconsin. After the Covid-19 pandemic, the Packers transitioned to holding training camp at Lambeau Field and its adjacent training facilities. Although the team allowed players back to St. Norbert's dormitories in 2022, starting in 2023, players either stayed at home or at a local hotel. Training camp at St. Norbert reflected the smalltown culture that the Packers are known for by providing close contact between fans and players, creating a college atmosphere for the players, and starting the well-known and still ongoing tradition of Packers players riding kids bicycles to practice.

== See also ==
- Chronology of home stadiums for current National Football League teams
- List of current National Football League stadiums
