= 1924 Hammond Pros season =

National Football League team season

- Head coach: Wally Hess

Results
- Record: 2–2–1
- League place: 10th NFL

The 1924 Hammond Pros season was their fifth in the league. The team improved on their previous output of 1–5–1, winning two games.

The team played its final game of the season on November 2. The best players from the team finished the season playing with the counterparts on the similarly shuttered Kenosha Maroons as part of a touring team known as the Kenosha All-Stars.

== Schedule ==
Game	Date	Opponent	Result	Record	Venue	Attendance	Recap	Sources
1	September 28	at Racine Legion	L 0–10	0–1	Horlick Field	3,000	Recap	
—	October 5	(open date)						
2	October 12	at Rock Island Independents	L 0–26	0–2	Douglas Park	3,000	Recap	
3	October 19	at Kenosha Maroons	T 6–6	0–2–1	Nash Field	600	Recap	
4	October 26	at Chicago Cardinals	W 6–3	1–2–1	Comiskey Park	3,500	Recap	
5	November 2	at Kansas City Blues	W 6–0	2–2–1	Muehlebach Field		Recap	
—	November 9	(open date)						
—	November 16	(open date)						
—	November 23	(open date)						
—	November 30	(open date)						

== Standings ==
NFL standings
	W	L	T	PCT	PF	PA	STK
Cleveland Bulldogs	7	1	1	.875	229	60	W2
Chicago Bears	6	1	4	.857	136	55	W3
Frankford Yellow Jackets	11	2	1	.846	326	109	W8
Duluth Kelleys	5	1	0	.833	56	16	W1
Rock Island Independents	5	2	2	.714	88	38	L1
Green Bay Packers	7	4	0	.636	108	38	L1
Racine Legion	4	3	3	.571	69	47	W1
Chicago Cardinals	5	4	1	.556	90	67	L1
Buffalo Bisons	6	5	0	.545	120	140	L3
Columbus Tigers	4	4	0	.500	91	68	L1
Hammond Pros	2	2	1	.500	18	45	W2
Milwaukee Badgers	5	8	0	.385	142	188	L2
Akron Pros	2	6	0	.250	59	132	W1
Dayton Triangles	2	6	0	.250	45	148	L6
Kansas City Blues	2	7	0	.222	46	124	L2
Kenosha Maroons	0	4	1	.000	12	117	L2
Minneapolis Marines	0	6	0	.000	14	108	L6
Rochester Jeffersons	0	7	0	.000	7	156	L7

Note: Tie games were not officially counted in the standings until 1972.

== Players ==
- Dunc Annan
- George Berry
- Teddy Besta
- Sol Butler
- John Detwiler
- Guil Falcon
- Bill Fortune
- Wally Hess
- Ward Meese
- Ray Neal
- Russ Oltz
- Mace Roberts
- Eddie Robinson
- Frank Rydzewski
- Lenny Sachs
- Si Seyfrit
- Dick Stahlman
- Steve Sullivan
- Dave Tallant
- Lou Usher
- Rat Watson
- Ink Williams
