= 1924 Milwaukee Badgers season =

National Football League team season

- Head coach: Hal Erickson

Results
- Record: 5–8
- League place: 12th in NFL

The 1924 Milwaukee Badgers season was their third in the National Football League. The team failed to improve on their previous output of 7–2–3, winning only five games. They finished twelfth in the league.

== Schedule ==
Game	Date	Opponent	Result	Record	Venue	Attendance	Recap	Sources
1	September 28	at Chicago Cardinals	L 7–17	0–1	Normal Park	4,000	Recap	
2	October 5	Kansas City Blues	W 3–0	1–1	Athletic Park		Recap	
3	October 12	Kenosha Maroons	W 21–0	2–1	Athletic Park	1,000	Recap	
4	October 19	at Green Bay Packers	L 0–17	2–2	Bellevue Park	4,150	Recap	
5	October 26	Racine Legion	L 0–10	2–3	Athletic Park	4,000	Recap	
6	November 2	at Chicago Cardinals	W 17–8	3–3	Comiskey Park	3,000	Recap	
7	November 9	Minneapolis Marines	W 28–7	4–3	Athletic Park		Recap	
8	November 11	at Kansas City Blues	L 3–7	4–4	Muehlebach Field	3,000	Recap	
9	November 16	Green Bay Packers	L 10–17	4–5	Athletic Park	3,800	Recap	
10	November 22	at Frankford Yellow Jackets	L 6–21	4–6	Frankford Stadium	5,000	Recap	
11	November 23	at Buffalo Bisons	W 23–0	5–6	Bison Stadium		Recap	
12	November 27	at Cleveland Bulldogs	L 10–53	5–7	Lakeside Park	4,000	Recap	
13	November 30	at Chicago Bears	L 14–31	5–8	Cubs Park	1,000+	Recap	
Note: November 22: Saturday. Thanksgiving Day: November 27.

== Standings ==
NFL standings
	W	L	T	PCT	PF	PA	STK
Cleveland Bulldogs	7	1	1	.875	229	60	W2
Chicago Bears	6	1	4	.857	136	55	W3
Frankford Yellow Jackets	11	2	1	.846	326	109	W8
Duluth Kelleys	5	1	0	.833	56	16	W1
Rock Island Independents	5	2	2	.714	88	38	L1
Green Bay Packers	7	4	0	.636	108	38	L1
Racine Legion	4	3	3	.571	69	47	W1
Chicago Cardinals	5	4	1	.556	90	67	L1
Buffalo Bisons	6	5	0	.545	120	140	L3
Columbus Tigers	4	4	0	.500	91	68	L1
Hammond Pros	2	2	1	.500	18	45	W2
Milwaukee Badgers	5	8	0	.385	142	188	L2
Akron Pros	2	6	0	.250	59	132	W1
Dayton Triangles	2	6	0	.250	45	148	L6
Kansas City Blues	2	7	0	.222	46	124	L2
Kenosha Maroons	0	4	1	.000	12	117	L2
Minneapolis Marines	0	6	0	.000	14	108	L6
Rochester Jeffersons	0	7	0	.000	7	156	L7

Note: Tie games were not officially counted in the standings until 1972.
