= 1924 Minneapolis Marines season =

National Football League team season

- Head coach: Joe Brandy
- Home stadium: Nicollet Park

Results
- Record: 0–6
- League place: T-16th in NFL

The 1924 Minneapolis Marines season was their fourth in the league and final as the Marines. The team failed to improve on their previous output of 2–5–2, losing six games. They tied for sixteenth place in the league.

== Schedule ==
| Game | Date | Opponent | Result | Record | Venue | Attendance | Recap | Sources |
|---|---|---|---|---|---|---|---|---|
| 1 | October 5 | Duluth Kelleys | L 0–3 | 0–1 | Nicollet Park | | Recap | |
| 2 | October 12 | at Chicago Cardinals | L 0–13 | 0–2 | Comiskey Park | 8,000 | Recap | |
| — | October 19 | (open date) | | | | | | |
| 3 | October 26 | at Green Bay Packers | L 0–19 | 0–3 | Bellevue Park | 2,500 | Recap | |
| 4 | November 2 | Duluth Kelleys | L 0–6 | 0–4 | Nicollet Park | | Recap | |
| 5 | November 9 | at Milwaukee Badgers | L 7–28 | 0–5 | Athletic Park | | Recap | |
| 6 | November 15 | at Frankford Yellow Jackets | L 7–39 | 0–6 | Frankford Stadium | | Recap | |
| — | November 23 | (open date) | | | | | | |
| — | November 30 | at Rock Island Independents | canceled by R.I. due to cold weather and snow | | | | | |
Note: November 15: Saturday.

== Standings ==
NFL standings
| | W | L | T | PCT | PF | PA | STK |
|---|---|---|---|---|---|---|---|
| Cleveland Bulldogs | 7 | 1 | 1 | .875 | 229 | 60 | W2 |
| Chicago Bears | 6 | 1 | 4 | .857 | 136 | 55 | W3 |
| Frankford Yellow Jackets | 11 | 2 | 1 | .846 | 326 | 109 | W8 |
| Duluth Kelleys | 5 | 1 | 0 | .833 | 56 | 16 | W1 |
| Rock Island Independents | 5 | 2 | 2 | .714 | 88 | 38 | L1 |
| Green Bay Packers | 7 | 4 | 0 | .636 | 108 | 38 | L1 |
| Racine Legion | 4 | 3 | 3 | .571 | 69 | 47 | W1 |
| Chicago Cardinals | 5 | 4 | 1 | .556 | 90 | 67 | L1 |
| Buffalo Bisons | 6 | 5 | 0 | .545 | 120 | 140 | L3 |
| Columbus Tigers | 4 | 4 | 0 | .500 | 91 | 68 | L1 |
| Hammond Pros | 2 | 2 | 1 | .500 | 18 | 45 | W2 |
| Milwaukee Badgers | 5 | 8 | 0 | .385 | 142 | 188 | L2 |
| Akron Pros | 2 | 6 | 0 | .250 | 59 | 132 | W1 |
| Dayton Triangles | 2 | 6 | 0 | .250 | 45 | 148 | L6 |
| Kansas City Blues | 2 | 7 | 0 | .222 | 46 | 124 | L2 |
| Kenosha Maroons | 0 | 4 | 1 | .000 | 12 | 117 | L2 |
| Minneapolis Marines | 0 | 6 | 0 | .000 | 14 | 108 | L6 |
| Rochester Jeffersons | 0 | 7 | 0 | .000 | 7 | 156 | L7 |

Note: Tie games were not officially counted in the standings until 1972.
