= 1924 Chicago Bears season =

NFL team season

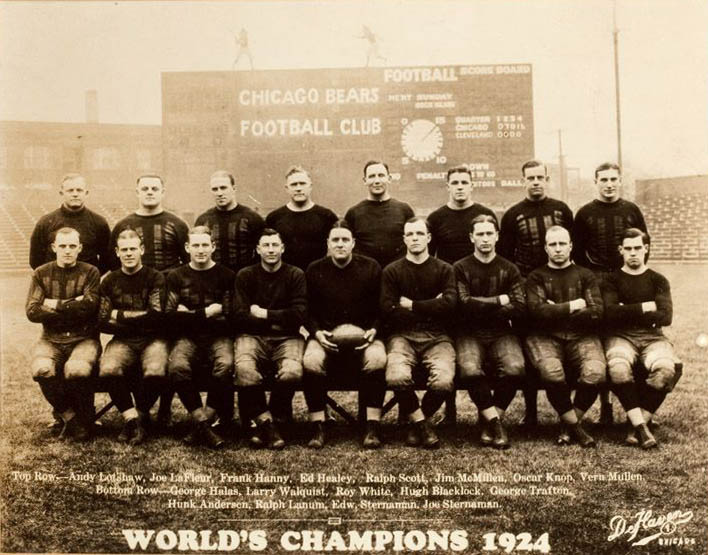
- Owner: George S. Halas, Dutch Sternaman
- Head coach: George Halas
- Home stadium: Cubs Park

Results
- Record: 8–3–4 Overall; 6–1–4 NFL
- League place: 2nd NFL

The 1924 Chicago Bears season was their fifth regular season completed in the National Football League. The team was unable to improve on their 9–2–2 record from 1923 and finished with an 8–3–4 record under head coach George Halas earning them a second-place finish in the team standings, the fourth time in the last five years. The Bears started slow with 2 ties and a loss, but quickly gained their stride, winning 6 of their last 8 games with two ties.

The Bears' only loss of the year was to the Cleveland Bulldogs, the eventual champions (the NFL officially considers the 1924 Bulldogs a different team than the Canton team from the previous year – however, all the players were the same). Despite coming in second, the Bears did defeat the cross-town rival Cardinals twice, both shutouts, and their future classic rival, the Green Bay Packers, once in a 3–0 shutout.

The Sternaman brothers again carried the team, with Joe Sternaman having his best season. The younger Sternaman scored 6 touchdowns, threw for another, had 9 field goals, and 12 PATs, finishing with 75 of the Bears' 136 points.

== Schedule ==
Game	Date	Opponent	Result	Record	Venue	Attendance	Recap	Sources
—	September 21	at Green Bay Packers	L 0–5	—	Bellevue Park	~ 4000	—	
1	September 28	at Rock Island Independents	T 0–0	0–0–1	Douglas Park	4,500	Recap	
2	October 5	at Cleveland Bulldogs	L 14–16	0–1–1	Dunn Field		Recap	
3	October 12	Racine Legion	T 10–10	0–1–2	Cubs Park	10,000	Recap	
4	October 19	Chicago Cardinals	W 6–0	1–1–2	Cubs Park	12,000	Recap	
5	October 26	Frankford Yellow Jackets	W 33–3	2–1–2	Cubs Park	8,000	Recap	
6	November 2	Rock Island Independents	T 3–3	2–1–3	Cubs Park	10,000	Recap	
7	November 9	Columbus Tigers	W 12–6	3–1–3	Cubs Park	7,000	Recap	
8	November 16	Racine Legion	T 3–3	3–1–4	Cubs Park	6,500	Recap	
9	November 23	Green Bay Packers	W 3–0	4–1–4	Cubs Park	6,000	Recap	
10	November 27	at Chicago Cardinals	W 21–0	5–1–4	Cubs Park	13,000	Recap	
11	November 30	Milwaukee Badgers	W 31–14	6–1–4	Cubs Park	1,000+	Recap	
—	December 7	Cleveland Bulldogs	W 23–0	—	Cubs Park	15,000	—	
—	December 13	at Frankford Yellow Jackets	W 13–10	—	Frankford Stadium	20,000	—	
—	December 14	Rock Island Independents	L 6–7	—	Cubs Park	7,000	—	
Note: Game in italics exhibitions (not recognized in league statistics). Thanksgiving Day: November 27.

== Standings ==
Final NFL standings for 1924, as published by the Chicago Tribune on the eve of the December 7 "championship game". A Thanksgiving Day game between Rock Island and Kenosha, won by the former, 10–6, is included as official.

NFL standings
	W	L	T	PCT	PF	PA	STK
Cleveland Bulldogs	7	1	1	.875	229	60	W2
Chicago Bears	6	1	4	.857	136	55	W3
Frankford Yellow Jackets	11	2	1	.846	326	109	W8
Duluth Kelleys	5	1	0	.833	56	16	W1
Rock Island Independents	5	2	2	.714	88	38	L1
Green Bay Packers	7	4	0	.636	108	38	L1
Racine Legion	4	3	3	.571	69	47	W1
Chicago Cardinals	5	4	1	.556	90	67	L1
Buffalo Bisons	6	5	0	.545	120	140	L3
Columbus Tigers	4	4	0	.500	91	68	L1
Hammond Pros	2	2	1	.500	18	45	W2
Milwaukee Badgers	5	8	0	.385	142	188	L2
Akron Pros	2	6	0	.250	59	132	W1
Dayton Triangles	2	6	0	.250	45	148	L6
Kansas City Blues	2	7	0	.222	46	124	L2
Kenosha Maroons	0	4	1	.000	12	117	L2
Minneapolis Marines	0	6	0	.000	14	108	L6
Rochester Jeffersons	0	7	0	.000	7	156	L7

Note: Tie games were not officially counted in the standings until 1972.

== The December contests ==
Chicago quarterback Joey Sternaman runs for a first quarter touchdown in the December 7 game against the Cleveland Bulldogs.

== Roster ==
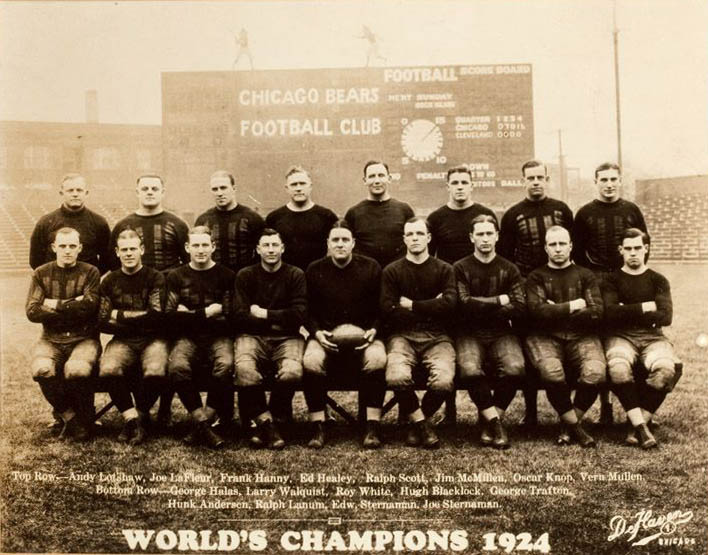
Official team photo of the 1924 Chicago Bears football club. Although the Bears proclaimed themselves World Champions based on a December 7 victory over Cleveland following completion of the regular season, and were widely accepted as such in the press, league owners selected the Cleveland Bulldogs as NFL champions of 1924.

=== Future Hall of Fame players ===
- George Halas, end
- Ed Healey, tackle
- George Trafton, center

=== Other leading players ===
- Dutch Sternaman, halfback
- Joe Sternaman, quarterback
- Laurie Walquist, quarterback
- Hunk Anderson, guard
- John Bryan, back
