= 1924 Duluth Kelleys season =

National Football League team season

- Owner: Marshall C. Gebert; Dewey Scanlon; Joey Sternaman; Dan "Doc" Williams
- Head coach: Dewey Scanlon
- Home stadium: Athletic Park

Results
- Record: 5–1 (NFL); 8–1–4 (overall)
- League place: 4th NFL

The 1924 Duluth Kelleys season was their second in the National Football League (NFL). The club improved on their previous output of 4–3, winning five games. The team also played 7 non-league games, exhibition contests from the NFL's perspective, winning 3 and tying 4.

The club, known commonly in the press as Kelley–Duluth, finished 4th out of 18 teams in the 1924 NFL standings.

== Schedule ==
Game	Date	Opponent	Result	Record	Venue	Attendance	Recap	Sources
–	September 7	West Duluth	T 0–0	—	Athletic Park		—	
–	September 28	at Bessemer, Michigan	W 13–0	—			—	
–	September 21	Ironwood Legion	T 0–0	—	Athletic Park		—	
1	September 28	Green Bay Packers	W 6–3	1–0	Athletic Park	2,200	Recap	
2	October 5	at Minneapolis Marines	W 3–0	2–0	Nicollet Park		Recap	
–	October 12	at Ironwood Legion	T 0–0	—	Ironwood Ball Park		—	
–	October 19	Hibbing All-Stars	W 20–7	—	Athletic Park		—	
3	October 26	Kenosha Maroons	W 32–0	3–0	Athletic Park	"fair-sized crowd"	Recap	
4	November 2	at Minneapolis Marines	W 6–0	4–0	Nicollet Park		Recap	
5	November 9	at Green Bay Packers	L 0–13	4–1	Bellevue Park	2,700	Recap	
–	November 16	at Ironwood Legion	T 0–0	—	Ironwood Ball Park		—	
6	November 23	at Rock Island Independents	W 9–0	5–1	Douglas Park	2,500	Recap	
–	November 27 (?)	Superior Christy	W 14–7	—	Athletic Park		—	
Note: Games in italics indicate a non-NFL opponent.

== Standings ==
Kelley-Duluth set some sort of gridiron record playing three complete scoreless games against the Ironwood (Michigan) American Legion team in 1924.

NFL standings
	W	L	T	PCT	PF	PA	STK
Cleveland Bulldogs	7	1	1	.875	229	60	W2
Chicago Bears	6	1	4	.857	136	55	W3
Frankford Yellow Jackets	11	2	1	.846	326	109	W8
Duluth Kelleys	5	1	0	.833	56	16	W1
Rock Island Independents	5	2	2	.714	88	38	L1
Green Bay Packers	7	4	0	.636	108	38	L1
Racine Legion	4	3	3	.571	69	47	W1
Chicago Cardinals	5	4	1	.556	90	67	L1
Buffalo Bisons	6	5	0	.545	120	140	L3
Columbus Tigers	4	4	0	.500	91	68	L1
Hammond Pros	2	2	1	.500	18	45	W2
Milwaukee Badgers	5	8	0	.385	142	188	L2
Akron Pros	2	6	0	.250	59	132	W1
Dayton Triangles	2	6	0	.250	45	148	L6
Kansas City Blues	2	7	0	.222	46	124	L2
Kenosha Maroons	0	4	1	.000	12	117	L2
Minneapolis Marines	0	6	0	.000	14	108	L6
Rochester Jeffersons	0	7	0	.000	7	156	L7

Note: Tie games were not officially counted in the standings until 1972.
