= 1924 Kansas City Blues season =

National Football League team season

- Head coach: Roy Andrews
- Home stadium: Muehlebach Field

Results
- Record: 2–7
- League place: 15th NFL

The 1924 Kansas City Blues season was their inaugural season in the National Football League (NFL). The team finished with 2 wins and 7 losses — 15th place in the 18-team league.

== Schedule ==
Game	Date	Opponent	Result	Record	Venue	Attendance	Recap	Sources
1	October 5	at Milwaukee Badgers	L 0–3	0–1	Athletic Park		Recap	
2	October 12	at Green Bay Packers	L 0–16	0–2	Bellevue Park	2,800	Recap	
3	October 19	at Racine Legion	L 3–13	0–3	Horlick Field		Recap	
4	October 26	Rock Island Independents	W 23–7	1–3	Muehlebach Field	< 2,000	Recap	
5	November 2	Hammond Pros	L 0–6	1–4	Muehlebach Field		Recap	
6	November 8	at Frankford Yellow Jackets	L 7–42	1–5	Frankford Stadium	10,000	Recap	
7	November 11	Milwaukee Badgers	W 7–3	2–5	Muehlebach Field	3,000	Recap	
8	November 16	at Rock Island Independents	L 0–17	2–6	Douglas Park	3,000	Recap	
9	November 27	Green Bay Packers	L 6–17	2–7	Muehlebach Field	1,542	Recap	
Note: Thanksgiving Day: November 27.

== Standings ==
NFL standings
	W	L	T	PCT	PF	PA	STK
Cleveland Bulldogs	7	1	1	.875	229	60	W2
Chicago Bears	6	1	4	.857	136	55	W3
Frankford Yellow Jackets	11	2	1	.846	326	109	W8
Duluth Kelleys	5	1	0	.833	56	16	W1
Rock Island Independents	5	2	2	.714	88	38	L1
Green Bay Packers	7	4	0	.636	108	38	L1
Racine Legion	4	3	3	.571	69	47	W1
Chicago Cardinals	5	4	1	.556	90	67	L1
Buffalo Bisons	6	5	0	.545	120	140	L3
Columbus Tigers	4	4	0	.500	91	68	L1
Hammond Pros	2	2	1	.500	18	45	W2
Milwaukee Badgers	5	8	0	.385	142	188	L2
Akron Pros	2	6	0	.250	59	132	W1
Dayton Triangles	2	6	0	.250	45	148	L6
Kansas City Blues	2	7	0	.222	46	124	L2
Kenosha Maroons	0	4	1	.000	12	117	L2
Minneapolis Marines	0	6	0	.000	14	108	L6
Rochester Jeffersons	0	7	0	.000	7	156	L7

Note: Tie games were not officially counted in the standings until 1972.
