= 1924 Rochester Jeffersons season =

National Football League team season

- General manager: Leo Lyons
- Head coach: Leo Lyons and Johnny Murphy
- Home stadium: Edgerton Park

Results
- Record: 0–7 (NFL); 2–8 (overall)
- League place: T–16th in NFL

The 1924 Rochester Jeffersons season was their fifth in the National Football League (NFL). The club continued to stack losses on the 0–4 record of the 1923 team, finishing 0–7 — last in the 18-team league. In these seven losing NFL contests, the Jeffs were outscored by a margin of 156 to 7, suffering shutouts six times.

The team did win two of three games played against non-NFL opponents, with the best victory of the season coming in a lightly-attended final game against the Pottsville Maroons — a previously undefeated 12-win team that would join the NFL in 1925.

== Schedule ==
Game	Date	Opponent	Result	Record	Venue	Attendance	Recap	Sources
1	September 27	at Frankford Yellow Jackets	L 0–21	0–1	Frankford Stadium	7,000	Recap	
2	October 5	Akron Pros	L 0–3	0–2	Edgerton Park	1,200	Recap	
3	October 12	Columbus Tigers	L 7–15	0–3	Edgerton Park	2,000	Recap	
4	October 19	at Buffalo Bisons	L 0–26	0–4	Bison Stadium	3,500	Recap	
5	October 26	at Cleveland Bulldogs	L 0–59	0–5	Dunn Field	5,000	Recap	
—	November 2	at Utica Knights of Columbus	W 6–0	—	Utica, New York	500	—	
—	November 9	at Providence Steam Roller	L 0–3	—	Kinsley Park		—	
6	November 16	at Columbus Tigers	L 0–16	0–6	West Side Athletic Club	2,500	Recap	
7	November 22	Buffalo Bisons	L 0–16	0–7	Edgerton Park	2,500	Recap	
—	November 30	at Pottsville Maroons	W 10–7	—	Minersville Park	"few in number"	—	
Notes: Non-league games in italics. • September 27 & November 22: Saturday.

== Standings ==
NFL standings
	W	L	T	PCT	PF	PA	STK
Cleveland Bulldogs	7	1	1	.875	229	60	W2
Chicago Bears	6	1	4	.857	136	55	W3
Frankford Yellow Jackets	11	2	1	.846	326	109	W8
Duluth Kelleys	5	1	0	.833	56	16	W1
Rock Island Independents	5	2	2	.714	88	38	L1
Green Bay Packers	7	4	0	.636	108	38	L1
Racine Legion	4	3	3	.571	69	47	W1
Chicago Cardinals	5	4	1	.556	90	67	L1
Buffalo Bisons	6	5	0	.545	120	140	L3
Columbus Tigers	4	4	0	.500	91	68	L1
Hammond Pros	2	2	1	.500	18	45	W2
Milwaukee Badgers	5	8	0	.385	142	188	L2
Akron Pros	2	6	0	.250	59	132	W1
Dayton Triangles	2	6	0	.250	45	148	L6
Kansas City Blues	2	7	0	.222	46	124	L2
Kenosha Maroons	0	4	1	.000	12	117	L2
Minneapolis Marines	0	6	0	.000	14	108	L6
Rochester Jeffersons	0	7	0	.000	7	156	L7

Note: Tie games were not officially counted in the standings until 1972.
