= Jack Hueller =

American football player (1896–1958)

Profile
- Position: Guard

Personal information
- Born: September 29, 1989; Milwaukee, Wisconsin, U.S.
- Died: August 29, 1993 (aged 94); Milwaukee, Wisconsin, U.S.
- Listed height: 5 ft 10 in (1.78 m)
- Listed weight: 200 lb (91 kg)

Career information
- College: None

Career history
- Racine Legion (1922–1924)

Career statistics
- Games played: 22
- Games started: 6
- Stats at Pro Football Reference

John C. "Jack" Hueller (September 29, 1898 – August 29, 1993) was an American football guard for the Racine Legion of the National Football League (NFL) from 1922 to 1924.
