= 1924 Frankford Yellow Jackets season =

National Football League team season

- Head coach: Punk Berryman
- Home stadium: Frankford Stadium

Results
- Record: 17–3–1 Overall; 11–2–1 NFL
- League place: 3rd NFL

The 1924 Frankford Yellow Jackets season was their inaugural season in the National Football League. The team finished 11–2–1 in league play and 17–3–1 overall, enough to finish in third in the league.

Due to Pennsylvania's Blue laws prohibiting football on Sundays, still in force in 1924, the Yellow Jackets played their home games on Saturday, frequently hopping a train to play a back-to-back game on Sunday of same weekend in another state.

== Schedule ==
Week	Date	Opponent	Result	Record	Venue	Attendance	Recap	Sources
1	September 27	Rochester Jeffersons	W 21–0	1–0	Frankford Stadium	7,000	Recap	
2	October 4 †	Kenosha Maroons	W 31–6	2–0	Frankford Stadium	7,000	Recap	
3	October 5	at Dayton Triangles	L 7–19	2–1	Triangle Park	4,000	Recap	
4	October 11 †	Cleveland Bulldogs	T 3–3	2–1–1	Frankford Stadium		Recap	
–	October 12 (?)	at Staten Island Stapletons	W 27–6	—	Thompson Stadium		—	
5	October 18 †	Columbus Tigers	W 23–7	3–1–1	Frankford Stadium	10,000	Recap	
—	October 25 †	Providence Steam Roller	W 21–10	—	Frankford Stadium		—	
6	October 26	at Chicago Bears	L 3–33	3–2–1	Cubs Park	8,000	Recap	
7	November 1 †	Akron Pros	W 23–0	4–2–1	Frankford Stadium	6,000	Recap	
8	November 2	at Buffalo Bisons	W 24–0	5–2–1	Bison Stadium	6,000	Recap	
9	November 8 †	Kansas City Blues	W 42–7	6–2–1	Frankford Stadium	10,000	Recap	
10	November 15 †	Minneapolis Marines	W 39–7	7–2–1	Frankford Stadium	8,000	Recap	
11	November 16	at Cleveland Bulldogs	W 12–7	8–2–1	Dunn Field		Recap	
12	November 22 †	Milwaukee Badgers	W 21–6	9–2–1	Frankford Stadium	5,000	Recap	
—	November 23	at Providence Steam Roller	W 16–3	—	Cycledrome		—	
13	November 27	Dayton Triangles	W 32–7	10–2–1	Frankford Stadium	15,000	Recap	
14	November 29 †	Buffalo Bisons	W 45–7	11–2–1	Frankford Stadium	7,000	Recap	
–	December 6 †	Shenandoah Yellow Jackets	W 27–6	—	Frankford Stadium		—	
–	December 7	at Waterbury Blues	W 14–0	—	Brassco Field		—	
–	December 13 †	Chicago Bears	L 10–13	—	Frankford Stadium	20,000	—	
–	December 14	at Clifton Heights Orange & Black	W 34–0	—			—	
Note: † denotes Saturday game. Non-NFL games are in italics. Thanksgiving Day: November 27.
December 13 Bears game ruled a post-season exhibition by league president, did not count on record.

== Standings ==
NFL standings
	W	L	T	PCT	PF	PA	STK
Cleveland Bulldogs	7	1	1	.875	229	60	W2
Chicago Bears	6	1	4	.857	136	55	W3
Frankford Yellow Jackets	11	2	1	.846	326	109	W8
Duluth Kelleys	5	1	0	.833	56	16	W1
Rock Island Independents	5	2	2	.714	88	38	L1
Green Bay Packers	7	4	0	.636	108	38	L1
Racine Legion	4	3	3	.571	69	47	W1
Chicago Cardinals	5	4	1	.556	90	67	L1
Buffalo Bisons	6	5	0	.545	120	140	L3
Columbus Tigers	4	4	0	.500	91	68	L1
Hammond Pros	2	2	1	.500	18	45	W2
Milwaukee Badgers	5	8	0	.385	142	188	L2
Akron Pros	2	6	0	.250	59	132	W1
Dayton Triangles	2	6	0	.250	45	148	L6
Kansas City Blues	2	7	0	.222	46	124	L2
Kenosha Maroons	0	4	1	.000	12	117	L2
Minneapolis Marines	0	6	0	.000	14	108	L6
Rochester Jeffersons	0	7	0	.000	7	156	L7

Note: Tie games were not officially counted in the standings until 1972.
