= 1924 Rock Island Independents season =

National Football League team season

- Owner: Dale Johnson
- General manager: A.H. Bowlby
- President: James D. Bruner
- Head coach: Johnny Armstrong
- Home stadium: Douglas Park

Results
- Record: 5–2–2 (NFL) (8–2–2 overall)
- League place: 5th in NFL

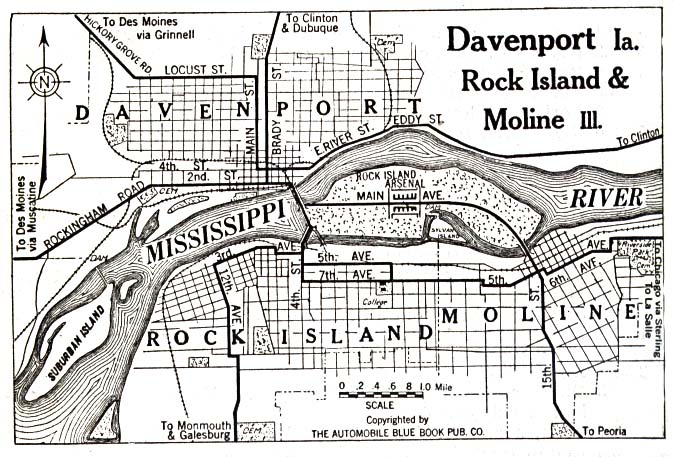
Map of the Quad Cities area from 1919. The four cities had a combined population of about 120,000 in 1920.

The 1924 Rock Island Independents season was their fifth in the National Football League (NFL). The Rock Island, Illinois team improved from their two-win season in 1923 by winning five games, good for fifth place in the 18-team league.

== Background ==
=== League meeting ===
Ahead of the annual league meeting, held at the Hotel Sherman in Chicago on January 26–27, a representative of the Independents, noting endemic heavy financial losses in the 1923 NFL season, warned that many franchises might not be able to continue indefinitely under the current salary system. The Independents seem to have weathered the financial onslaught better than many in 1923.

=== Organizational activities ===
Rock Island had the benefit of the backing of a strong network of local businessmen from throughout the "Quad-Cities" of Rock Island, Davenport, Moline, and East Moline. On August 12, some 80 businessmen and team backers gathered in the Rock Island county courthouse to organize the 1924 team administratively and financially. Assistant state's attorney James D. Bruner was elected team president for 1924 and a board of 10 active directors were voted in, along with honorary directors representing Davenport, Moline, and East Moline. The $1,000 forfeiture bond required by the NFL was raised and sent to the league office. Selection of the team's coach for 1924 and a permanent secretary was left to President Bruner and the newly-elected board, who were to meet in 24 hours.

=== Signing of Jim Thorpe ===
Quad-Cities fans were excited to learn in late September that the legendary Jim Thorpe was signed to play the 1924 NFL season with the Rock Island Independents.

On September 21, it was announced that the Rock Island Independents has succeeded in outbidding several other teams around the NFL for the services of the legendary back Jim Thorpe for the 1924 season. The timeless 37-year old's tenure as captain and organizer of the Oorang Indians franchise had come to an end at the conclusion of the 1923 season, the team awash in red ink and terminated. Although hampered by injuries in recent seasons, the 6'1" Thorpe remained a powerful and threatening open-field runner and was regarded as the best punter in football.

Thorpe's gridiron exploits were legendary, with the Rock Island Argus telling the tale of Christmas 1922 exhibition game against collegiate all-stars in which Thorpe had run for a 95-yard touchdown, punted the ball 85 yards from the back of his own end zone, and connected on a 67-yard drop kick field goal. General admission for Thorpe's September 29 debut was set at $1.10, with 2,000 Douglas Field bleacher seats available at the price. Grandstand bleachers were priced at an additional 25 or 50 cents, depending on location, and field box seats were to cost $1.00 extra.

Thorpe was eventually followed to the Islanders by two of his former Oorang teammates — halfback Joe Guyon and lineman Joe Little Twig. The aging superstar halfback was able to play all 9 regular season games, although he injured his shoulder in the November 23 game against Kelley–Duluth and was unable to play in the Thanksgiving Day exhibition against the Kenosha All-Stars.

=== Duke Slater affair ===
The Islanders became the focus of controversy late in October when during their first road trip of the season, the new NFL team the Kansas City Blues refused to take the field if Rock Island's star African American tackle, Duke Slater, was allowed to play. Rock Island acceded to the racist demand — despite the fact that Slater had been named a second-team member of the league's "All-American Professional Football Team" by the league's sportswriters the previous season and remained a critical member of Rock Island's line.

The result was one of the year's biggest upsets, when the Blues toppled the green-and-white by a score of 23 to 7 — Kansas City's first NFL win after three consecutive losses to open the year and Rock Island's first defeat. "Rock Island players said if 'Duke' Slater, former Iowa negro tackle, had been allowed to play the result would have been different," one Kansas City newspaper noted. For their part, Rock Island looked to "securing their revenge" when Kansas City was scheduled to travel to Illinois for the second leg of the home-and-home series three weeks later. They would, indeed, delivering a 17–0 shutout.

== Schedule ==
Game	Date	Opponent	Result	Record	Venue	Attendance	Recap	Sources
—	September 21	Moline Indians	W 7–0	—	Douglas Park	1,500	—	
1	September 28	Chicago Bears	T 0–0	0–0–1	Douglas Park	4,500	Recap	
2	October 5	Racine Legion	W 9–0	1–0–1	Douglas Park	3,500	Recap	
3	October 12	Hammond Pros	W 26–0	2–0–1	Douglas Park	3,000	Recap	
4	October 19	Dayton Triangles	W 20–0	3–0–1	Douglas Park	4,500	Recap	
5	October 26	at Kansas City Blues	L 7–23	3–1–1	Muehlebach Field	< 2,000	Recap	
6	November 2	at Chicago Bears	T 3–3	3–1–2	Cubs Park	10,000	Recap	
7	November 9	at Racine Legion	W 6–3	4–1–2	Horlick Field	3,500	Recap	
8	November 16	Kansas City Blues	W 17–0	5–1–2	Douglas Park	3,000	Recap	
9	November 23	Duluth Kelleys	L 0–9	5–2–2	Douglas Park	2,500	Recap	
—	November 27	Kenosha All-Stars	W 10–6	—	Douglas Park	1,500	—	
—	November 30	Minneapolis Marines	canceled by R.I. due to cold weather and snow					
—	December 14	Chicago Bears	W 7–6	—	Cubs Park	7,000	—	
Note: Games in italics non-league games. Thanksgiving Day: November 27.

== Standings ==
Final NFL standings for 1924, as published by the Chicago Tribune on the eve of the December 7 "championship game". The Thanksgiving Day game between the Independents and Kenosha, won by the Rock Island, 10–6, was at the time regarded as official.

NFL standings
	W	L	T	PCT	PF	PA	STK
Cleveland Bulldogs	7	1	1	.875	229	60	W2
Chicago Bears	6	1	4	.857	136	55	W3
Frankford Yellow Jackets	11	2	1	.846	326	109	W8
Duluth Kelleys	5	1	0	.833	56	16	W1
Rock Island Independents	5	2	2	.714	88	38	L1
Green Bay Packers	7	4	0	.636	108	38	L1
Racine Legion	4	3	3	.571	69	47	W1
Chicago Cardinals	5	4	1	.556	90	67	L1
Buffalo Bisons	6	5	0	.545	120	140	L3
Columbus Tigers	4	4	0	.500	91	68	L1
Hammond Pros	2	2	1	.500	18	45	W2
Milwaukee Badgers	5	8	0	.385	142	188	L2
Akron Pros	2	6	0	.250	59	132	W1
Dayton Triangles	2	6	0	.250	45	148	L6
Kansas City Blues	2	7	0	.222	46	124	L2
Kenosha Maroons	0	4	1	.000	12	117	L2
Minneapolis Marines	0	6	0	.000	14	108	L6
Rochester Jeffersons	0	7	0	.000	7	156	L7

Note: Tie games were not officially counted in the standings until 1972.

== Roster ==
The following players saw action in at least one game for the Rock Island Independents during the 1924 season. The total number of NFL games played by each follows in parentheses.

The 1924 Islanders' roster included three men who would later be inducted into the Pro Football Hall of Fame: tackle Duke Slater (class of 2020) and halfbacks Jim Thorpe (inaugural class) and Joe Guyon (class of 1966).

Three members of the 1924 Islanders team: end Mike Wilson, Hall of Fame tackle Duke Slater, and halfback Johnny Armstrong.

Linemen

- Joe Bernstein (5)
- Walt Buland (5)
- Clay (0)
- Frank DeClerk (8)
- Louie Kolls (9)
- Joe Kraker (5)
- Joe Little Twig (7)
- Ned Scott (9)
- Fred "Duke" Slater (8)
- Basil Stanley (1)
- George Thompson (9)
- R.N. Thompson (0)
- Fred Thomsen (9)
- Mike Wilson (8)

Backs

- Johnny Armstrong (9)
- Bill Ashbaugh (1)
- Wes Bradshaw (7)
- Buck Gavin (9)
- Joe Guyon (3)
- Vince McCarthy (2)
- Bob Phelan (6)
- Jim Thorpe (9)
- Rube Ursella - captain (7)
