= Irv Carlson =

American football player (1896–1960)

Profile
- Position: WB / TB

Personal information
- Born: August 6, 1896; St. Cloud, Minnesota, U.S.
- Died: August 5, 1960 (63); Spokane Valley, Washington
- Listed height: 5 ft 8 in (1.73 m)
- Listed weight: 170 lb (77 kg)

Career information
- College: Saint John's (Minnesota); Wisconsin

Career history
- Kenosha Maroons (1924)

Career NFL statistics
- Games played: 2
- Games completed: 2
- Stats at Pro Football Reference

Irving Morris Carlson (August 6, 1896 – August 5, 1960) was an American football player in the National Football League. He played with the Kenosha Maroons.
