= Michael F. Seyfrit =

American football player (1898–1955)

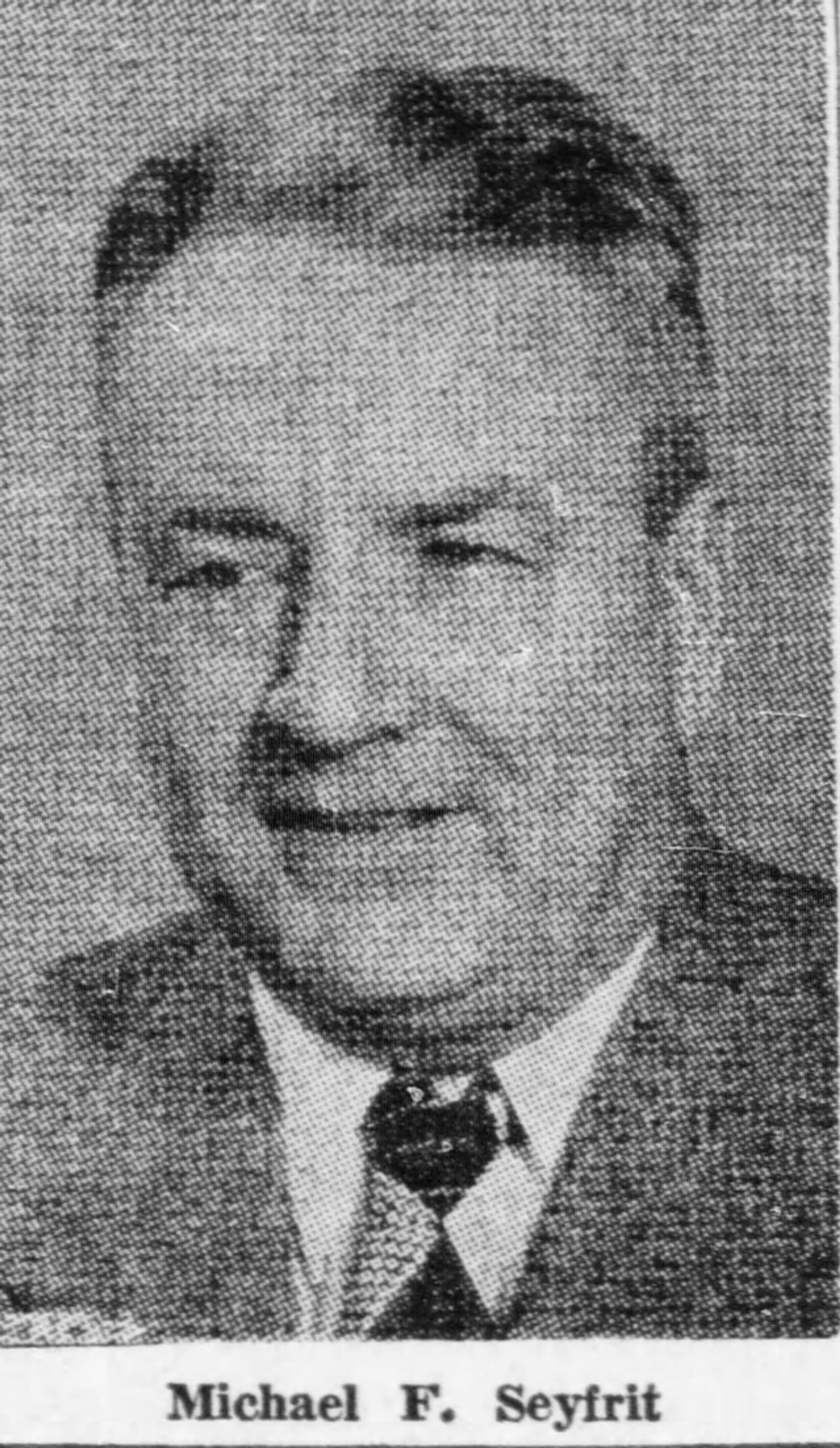

Profile
- Position: End

Personal information
- Born: January 31, 1898; Carlinville, Illinois, U.S.
- Died: September 1, 1955 (aged 57); Bloomington, Illinois U.S.
- Listed height: 5 ft 10 in (1.78 m)
- Listed weight: 170 lb (77 kg)

Career information
- High school: Carlinville
- College: Notre Dame

Career history
- Toledo Maroons (1923); Hammond Pros (1924)

Career statistics
- Games: 13

Michael Franklin "Si" Seyfrit (January 31, 1898 – September 1, 1955) was an American football player and public official.

Seyfrit was born in 1898 at Carlinville, Illinois, and attended Carlinville High School. He played college football under Knute Rockne at Notre Dame in 1920 and 1921. During his two seasons at Notre Dame, the Fighting Irish compiled a 9–0 record in 1920 and 10–1 in 1921.

He then played professional football as an end in the National Football League (NFL) for the Toledo Maroons in 1923 and the Hammond Pros in 1924. He appeared in 13 NFL games, 12 as a starter.

Seyfrit served as state's attorney for Macoupin County from 1932 to 1940. He later served as director of public safety from 1950 to 1952 under Illinois Governor Adlai Stevenson II and as chairman of the Illinois Democratic State Central Committee. He also practiced law in Carlinville, Illinois. He was killed in a head-on automobile collision on U.S. Route 66 east of Bloomington, Illinois.
