= 1924 Dayton Triangles season =

National Football League team season

- Owner: Dayton Engineering Laboratories Company
- Head coach: Carl Storck
- Home stadium: Triangle Park

Results
- Record: 2–6
- League place: 13th NFL

The 1924 Dayton Triangles season marked the team's fifth year in the National Football League (NFL). The team slightly bettered their 1923 record of 1–6–1, winning two games and finishing 13th in the 18-team league.

== Schedule ==
Game	Date	Opponent	Result	Record	Venue	Attendance	Recap	Sources
1	October 5	Frankford Yellow Jackets	W 19–7	1–0	Triangle Park	4,000	Recap	
2	October 12	at Buffalo Bisons	W 7–0	2–0				
3	October 19	at Rock Island Independents	L 0–20	2–1	Douglas Park	4,500	Recap	
4	October 26	Columbus Tigers	L 6–17	2–2	Triangle Park			
5	November 2	at Cleveland Bulldogs	L 0–35	2–3				
6	November 9	at Chicago Cardinals	L 0–23	2–4				
7	November 16	at Buffalo Bisons	L 6–14	2–5				
8	November 27	at Frankford Yellow Jackets	L 7–32	2–6				
Note: Thanksgiving Day: November 27.

== Standings ==
NFL standings
	W	L	T	PCT	PF	PA	STK
Cleveland Bulldogs	7	1	1	.875	229	60	W2
Chicago Bears	6	1	4	.857	136	55	W3
Frankford Yellow Jackets	11	2	1	.846	326	109	W8
Duluth Kelleys	5	1	0	.833	56	16	W1
Rock Island Independents	5	2	2	.714	88	38	L1
Green Bay Packers	7	4	0	.636	108	38	L1
Racine Legion	4	3	3	.571	69	47	W1
Chicago Cardinals	5	4	1	.556	90	67	L1
Buffalo Bisons	6	5	0	.545	120	140	L3
Columbus Tigers	4	4	0	.500	91	68	L1
Hammond Pros	2	2	1	.500	18	45	W2
Milwaukee Badgers	5	8	0	.385	142	188	L2
Akron Pros	2	6	0	.250	59	132	W1
Dayton Triangles	2	6	0	.250	45	148	L6
Kansas City Blues	2	7	0	.222	46	124	L2
Kenosha Maroons	0	4	1	.000	12	117	L2
Minneapolis Marines	0	6	0	.000	14	108	L6
Rochester Jeffersons	0	7	0	.000	7	156	L7

Note: Tie games were not officially counted in the standings until 1972.
