= Len Smith (American football) =

American football player (1896–1944)

Profile
- Position: Tackle

Personal information
- Born: December 14, 1896; Oshkosh, Wisconsin
- Died: April 14, 1944 (aged 47)
- Listed height: 5 ft 11 in (1.80 m)
- Listed weight: 195 lb (88 kg)

Career information
- College: Wisconsin

Career history
- Racine Legion (1923–1924)

Career statistics
- Games played: 20
- Stats at Pro Football Reference

Leonard Marshall Smith (December 14, 1896 – April 14, 1944) was a player in the National Football League. He played two seasons with the Racine Legion.
