= 1924 Cleveland Bulldogs season =

National Football League team season

- Head coach: Guy Chamberlin

Results
- Record: 7–1–1 NFL (7–2–1 overall)
- League place: 1st NFL

The 1924 Cleveland Bulldogs season was their second season in the league. The team finished 7–1–1, the best record in the league, making them 1924 NFL Champions.

This championship is not considered a Bulldog (Canton) three-peat by the NFL but rather a standalone single championship. The reason for this is that the Canton Bulldogs, who were the league champions in 1922 and 1923, disbanded for 1924 and many of their players were absorbed by the Cleveland Indians franchise. The Cleveland Indians then renamed themselves as the Cleveland Bulldogs for 1924. But it was a different franchise altogether and had a different owner.

To make things even more confusing, the Canton Bulldogs reestablished themselves as a franchise in 1925 and both the Canton Bulldogs and Cleveland Bulldogs were teams in the league that year.

== Schedule ==
Game	Date	Opponent	Result	Record	Venue	Attendance	Recap	Sources
1	October 5	Chicago Bears	W 16–14	1–0	Dunn Field		Recap	
2	October 11	at Frankford Yellow Jackets	T 3–3	1–0–1	Frankford Stadium		Recap	
3	October 12	Akron Pros	W 29–14	2–0–1	Dunn Field	3,000	Recap	
—	October 19	(open date)		—			—	
4	October 26	Rochester Jeffersons	W 59–0	3–0–1	Dunn Field	5,000	Recap	
5	November 2	Dayton Triangles	W 35–0	4–0–1	Dunn Field		Recap	
6	November 9	at Akron Pros	W 20–7	5–0–1	League Park	5,000	Recap	
7	November 16	Frankford Yellow Jackets	L 7–12	5–1–1	Dunn Field		Recap	
8	November 23	Columbus Tigers	W 7–0	6–1–1	Dunn Field		Recap	
9	November 27	Milwaukee Badgers	W 53–10	7–1–1	Lakeside Park	4,000	Recap	
—	December 7	at Chicago Bears	L 0–23	—	Cubs Park	15,000	—	
Note: Game in italics exhibition (not recognized in league statistics). Thanksgiving Day: November 27.

== Standings ==
NFL standings
	W	L	T	PCT	PF	PA	STK
Cleveland Bulldogs	7	1	1	.875	229	60	W2
Chicago Bears	6	1	4	.857	136	55	W3
Frankford Yellow Jackets	11	2	1	.846	326	109	W8
Duluth Kelleys	5	1	0	.833	56	16	W1
Rock Island Independents	5	2	2	.714	88	38	L1
Green Bay Packers	7	4	0	.636	108	38	L1
Racine Legion	4	3	3	.571	69	47	W1
Chicago Cardinals	5	4	1	.556	90	67	L1
Buffalo Bisons	6	5	0	.545	120	140	L3
Columbus Tigers	4	4	0	.500	91	68	L1
Hammond Pros	2	2	1	.500	18	45	W2
Milwaukee Badgers	5	8	0	.385	142	188	L2
Akron Pros	2	6	0	.250	59	132	W1
Dayton Triangles	2	6	0	.250	45	148	L6
Kansas City Blues	2	7	0	.222	46	124	L2
Kenosha Maroons	0	4	1	.000	12	117	L2
Minneapolis Marines	0	6	0	.000	14	108	L6
Rochester Jeffersons	0	7	0	.000	7	156	L7

Note: Tie games were not officially counted in the standings until 1972.
