= 1924 Akron Pros season =

National Football League team season

- Head coach: Wayne Brenkert
- Home stadium: League Park

Results
- Record: 2–6
- Division place: T–13th NFL
- Playoffs: No playoffs until 1932

The 1924 Akron Pros season was their fifth in the National Football League (NFL). The team improved on their previous output of 1–6, winning two games despite playing six of their eight games on the road. They tied for thirteenth place in the league.

== Schedule ==
| Game | Date | Opponent | Result | Record | Venue | Attendance | Recap | Sources |
|---|---|---|---|---|---|---|---|---|
| 1 | October 5 | at Rochester Jeffersons | W 3–0 | 1–0 | Edgerton Park | 1,200 | Recap | |
| 2 | October 12 | at Cleveland Bulldogs | L 14–29 | 1–1 | Dunn Field | 3,000 | Recap | |
| — | October 19 | (open date) | | — | | | — | |
| 3 | October 26 | at Buffalo Bisons | L 13–17 | 1–2 | Bison Stadium | 4,500 | Recap | |
| 4 | November 1 | at Frankford Yellow Jackets | L 0–23 | 1–3 | Frankford Stadium | 6,000 | Recap | |
| 5 | November 2 | at Columbus Tigers | L 0–30 | 1–4 | West Side Athletic Club | 3,000 | Recap | |
| 6 | November 9 | Cleveland Bulldogs | L 7–20 | 1–5 | General Field | 5,000 | Recap | |
| 7 | November 16 | at Chicago Cardinals | L 0–13 | 1–6 | Comiskey Park | 2,500 | Recap | |
| — | November 23 | (open date) | | — | | | — | |
| 8 | November 27 | Buffalo Bisons | W 22–0 | 2–6 | General Field | "fair sized crowd" | Recap | |
Note: Thanksgiving Day: November 27.

== Standings ==
NFL standings
| | W | L | T | PCT | PF | PA | STK |
|---|---|---|---|---|---|---|---|
| Cleveland Bulldogs | 7 | 1 | 1 | .875 | 229 | 60 | W2 |
| Chicago Bears | 6 | 1 | 4 | .857 | 136 | 55 | W3 |
| Frankford Yellow Jackets | 11 | 2 | 1 | .846 | 326 | 109 | W8 |
| Duluth Kelleys | 5 | 1 | 0 | .833 | 56 | 16 | W1 |
| Rock Island Independents | 5 | 2 | 2 | .714 | 88 | 38 | L1 |
| Green Bay Packers | 7 | 4 | 0 | .636 | 108 | 38 | L1 |
| Racine Legion | 4 | 3 | 3 | .571 | 69 | 47 | W1 |
| Chicago Cardinals | 5 | 4 | 1 | .556 | 90 | 67 | L1 |
| Buffalo Bisons | 6 | 5 | 0 | .545 | 120 | 140 | L3 |
| Columbus Tigers | 4 | 4 | 0 | .500 | 91 | 68 | L1 |
| Hammond Pros | 2 | 2 | 1 | .500 | 18 | 45 | W2 |
| Milwaukee Badgers | 5 | 8 | 0 | .385 | 142 | 188 | L2 |
| Akron Pros | 2 | 6 | 0 | .250 | 59 | 132 | W1 |
| Dayton Triangles | 2 | 6 | 0 | .250 | 45 | 148 | L6 |
| Kansas City Blues | 2 | 7 | 0 | .222 | 46 | 124 | L2 |
| Kenosha Maroons | 0 | 4 | 1 | .000 | 12 | 117 | L2 |
| Minneapolis Marines | 0 | 6 | 0 | .000 | 14 | 108 | L6 |
| Rochester Jeffersons | 0 | 7 | 0 | .000 | 7 | 156 | L7 |

Note: Tie games were not officially counted in the standings until 1972.
