= 1924 Chicago Cardinals season =

American football team season

- Owner: Chris O'Brien
- Head coach: Arnie Horween
- Home stadium: Comiskey Park

Results
- Record: 5–4–1
- League place: 8th NFL

The 1924 Chicago Cardinals season was their fifth in the National Football League (NFL). The team won 5 games, lost 4, and tied one time, en route to an 8th-place finish.

== Schedule ==
Week	Date	Opponent	Result	Record	Venue	Attendance	Recap	Sources
—	September 21	Pullman Panthers	W 14–0	—	Normal Park		—	
1	September 28	Milwaukee Badgers	W 17–7	1–0	Normal Park	4,000	Recap	
2	October 5	Green Bay Packers	W 3–0	2–0	Normal Park	2,852	Recap	
3	October 12	Minneapolis Marines	W 13–0	3–0	Comiskey Park	8,000	Recap	
4	October 19	at Chicago Bears	L 0–6	3–1	Cubs Park	12,000	Recap	
5	October 26	Hammond Pros	L 3–6	3–2	Comiskey Park	3,500	Recap	
6	November 2	Milwaukee Badgers	L 8–17	3–3	Comiskey Park	3,000	Recap	
7	November 9	Dayton Triangles	W 23–0	4–3	Comiskey Park	2,500	Recap	
8	November 16	Akron Pros	W 13–0	5–3	Comiskey Park	2,500	Recap	
9	November 23	Racine Legion	T 10–10	5–3–1	Comiskey Park	4,000	Recap	
10	November 27	Chicago Bears	L 0–21	5–4–1	Comiskey Park	13,000	Recap	
Note: Games in italics indicate a non-NFL opponent. Thanksgiving Day: November 27.

== Standings ==
NFL standings
	W	L	T	PCT	PF	PA	STK
Cleveland Bulldogs	7	1	1	.875	229	60	W2
Chicago Bears	6	1	4	.857	136	55	W3
Frankford Yellow Jackets	11	2	1	.846	326	109	W8
Duluth Kelleys	5	1	0	.833	56	16	W1
Rock Island Independents	5	2	2	.714	88	38	L1
Green Bay Packers	7	4	0	.636	108	38	L1
Racine Legion	4	3	3	.571	69	47	W1
Chicago Cardinals	5	4	1	.556	90	67	L1
Buffalo Bisons	6	5	0	.545	120	140	L3
Columbus Tigers	4	4	0	.500	91	68	L1
Hammond Pros	2	2	1	.500	18	45	W2
Milwaukee Badgers	5	8	0	.385	142	188	L2
Akron Pros	2	6	0	.250	59	132	W1
Dayton Triangles	2	6	0	.250	45	148	L6
Kansas City Blues	2	7	0	.222	46	124	L2
Kenosha Maroons	0	4	1	.000	12	117	L2
Minneapolis Marines	0	6	0	.000	14	108	L6
Rochester Jeffersons	0	7	0	.000	7	156	L7

Note: Tie games were not officially counted in the standings until 1972.
