= 1924 Buffalo Bisons (NFL) season =

National Football League team season

1924 Buffalo Bisons season
- Head coach: Tommy Hughitt

Results
- Record: 6–5
- Division place: 9th NFL

The 1924 Buffalo Bisons season was their fifth in the league. The team failed to improve on their previous output of 5–4–3, losing five games. They finished ninth in the league.

== Schedule ==
Game	Date	Opponent	Result	Record	Venue	Attendance	Recap	Sources
1	October 5	Columbus Tigers	W 13–0	1–0	Bison Stadium	5,000	Recap	
2	October 12	Dayton Triangles	L 0–7	1–1	Bison Stadium	6,000	Recap	
3	October 19	Rochester Jeffersons	W 26–0	2–1	Bison Stadium	3,500	Recap	
4	October 26	Akron Pros	W 17–13	3–1	Bison Stadium	4,500	Recap	
5	November 2	Frankford Yellow Jackets	L 0–24	3–2	Bison Stadium	6,000	Recap	
6	November 9	Kenosha Maroons	W 27–0	4–2	Bison Stadium	3,500	Recap	
7	November 16	Dayton Triangles	W 14–6	5–2	Bison Stadium	2,700	Recap	
8	November 22	at Rochester Jeffersons	W 16–0	6–2	Edgerton Park	2,500	Recap	
9	November 23	Milwaukee Badgers	L 0–23	6–3	Bison Stadium		Recap	
10	November 27	at Akron Pros	L 0–22	6–4	General Field	"fair sized crowd"	Recap	
11	November 29	at Frankford Yellow Jackets	L 7–45	6–5	Frankford Stadium	7,000	Recap	
Note: Thanksgiving Day: November 27.

== Standings ==
NFL standings
	W	L	T	PCT	PF	PA	STK
Cleveland Bulldogs	7	1	1	.875	229	60	W2
Chicago Bears	6	1	4	.857	136	55	W3
Frankford Yellow Jackets	11	2	1	.846	326	109	W8
Duluth Kelleys	5	1	0	.833	56	16	W1
Rock Island Independents	5	2	2	.714	88	38	L1
Green Bay Packers	7	4	0	.636	108	38	L1
Racine Legion	4	3	3	.571	69	47	W1
Chicago Cardinals	5	4	1	.556	90	67	L1
Buffalo Bisons	6	5	0	.545	120	140	L3
Columbus Tigers	4	4	0	.500	91	68	L1
Hammond Pros	2	2	1	.500	18	45	W2
Milwaukee Badgers	5	8	0	.385	142	188	L2
Akron Pros	2	6	0	.250	59	132	W1
Dayton Triangles	2	6	0	.250	45	148	L6
Kansas City Blues	2	7	0	.222	46	124	L2
Kenosha Maroons	0	4	1	.000	12	117	L2
Minneapolis Marines	0	6	0	.000	14	108	L6
Rochester Jeffersons	0	7	0	.000	7	156	L7

Note: Tie games were not officially counted in the standings until 1972.
