= City Stadium (Green Bay) =

American football stadium in Wisconsin, US

Coordinates: 44.5075°N 87.9925°W

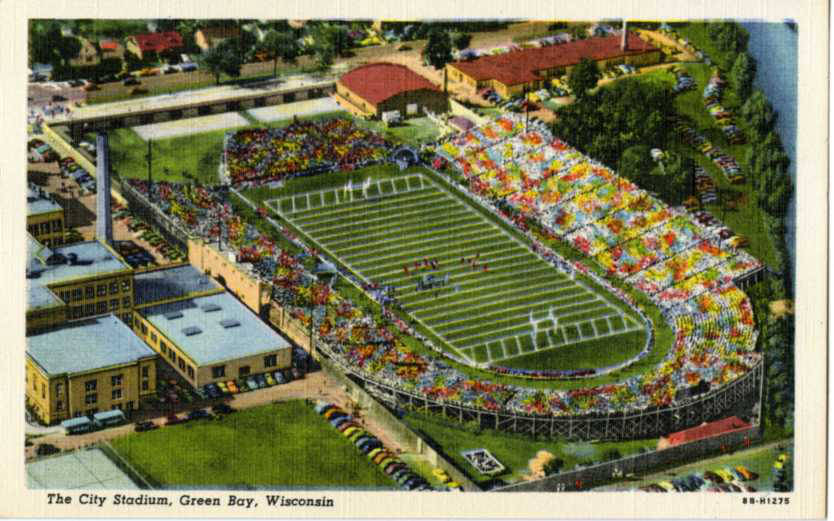
- City Stadium in 1948
- Interactive map of City Stadium
- Former names: East Stadium (1962–2002)
- Location: Green Bay, Wisconsin, U.S.
- Owner: Green Bay East High School
- Surface: Natural grass (1925–2017); Artificial turf (2017–present)

Construction
- Opened: 1925; 101 years ago
- Renovated: 2008

Tenants
- Green Bay Packers (1925–1956); Green Bay East High School (1925–present)

City Stadium, known as East Stadium from 1962 to 2002, is an American football stadium in Green Bay, Wisconsin, United States. The stadium was built in 1925 for use by Green Bay East High School, which is just to the south of the stadium, and the Green Bay Packers of the National Football League (NFL). City Stadium was the third home field for the Packers, after Hagemeister Park and Bellevue Park, and remained as such until 1956. During this time it was expanded from about 5,000 seats to 25,000. In 1933, the Packers began splitting their home games between Green Bay and Milwaukee, a practice that lasted until 1994 when they returned to playing all their games in Green Bay.

By the early 1950s, City Stadium was too small and lacked the features expected in modern football stadiums of the time. A bond initiative passed in the city of Green Bay to fund a new stadium for the Packers. After the Packers moved to "New City Stadium" (later renamed Lambeau Field) for the 1957 NFL season, "Old City Stadium" was downsized and continued to be used by East High School. In the early 2000s, the facility underwent multiple renovations, including enhancements to the playing field and stands, as well as the installation of features honoring the stadium's history as it related to the Packers; this included a historic marker and sign for the Packers Heritage Trail.

== History ==
The Green Bay Packers were founded in 1919 by Curly Lambeau and George Whitney Calhoun. From 1919 to 1922, they played their games at Hagemeister Park, a recreational area that hosted various sports and outdoor activities. Small, wooden bleachers were constructed, with some fans lining the playing field or sitting on their cars to watch the games. After the property was used to build a new Green Bay East High School, the Packers moved to the other side of the East River to Bellevue Park, which had been constructed to house a local baseball team that had also played at Hagemeister. The wood used for the bleachers at Hagemeister was reused to build a grandstand and bleachers at Bellevue. Bellevue Park had its challenges, with the field dimensions more conducive to baseball, its location far from town, and poor parking. After two seasons at Bellevue in 1923 and 1924, demand for a dedicated football stadium for the Packers grew.

City Stadium was built just north of Green Bay East High School, meaning it was adjacent to the former Hagemeister Park. The stadium was developed for use by Green Bay East High School and Green Bay West High School, but in reality the stadium was built to support the Packers. At its original capacity, the wooden bleachers fit more than 5,000 fans. It did not have any locker rooms, meaning that the Packers had to use adjacent facilities, including the downtown Columbus Club, while visiting teams usually got dressed at their hotel before coming to the stadium. The Packers played exclusively at City Stadium for their home games from their first season there in 1925 until 1933, when they began playing some games in Milwaukee. In 1933, they played one home game at Borchert Field before playing a few home games a year at Wisconsin State Fair Park from 1934 to 1951. In 1952, they played three games at Marquette Stadium while awaiting the completion of Milwaukee County Stadium, where they played until 1994 when the team returned to playing all their home games in Green Bay. In addition to high school and NFL games, City Stadium also hosted a few St. Norbert Green Knights football games from the 1930s to the 1950s.

During the stadium's earlier years, seating capacity fluctuated based on expected crowd sizes, with temporary seating built prior to games. The stadium underwent different improvements and expansions throughout its life. The original wood fence was replaced with a wire and canvas fence in 1927, although a wooden fence returned eight years later. In 1929, a public announcement system with eight speakers around the stadium was installed. Lighting to allow for high school teams to play night games on Fridays was added in 1935. From 1936 to 1940, City Stadium underwent its most significant enhancements. A locker room for the Packers was built underneath the south stands in 1936, while a year later a new press box, game clock, and fence was added, while the old bleachers were either replaced or significantly repaired. Seating for 5,000 more fans and better toilet facilities were also added. The Packers announced another project the next year to add another 6,500 seats to the stadium by connecting the two grandstands, forming a horseshoe shape. This project, which was funded by a Works Progress Administration (WPA) grant, also added new restrooms, better training areas, and stage for the Lumberjack Band. Another WPA grant in 1940 funded a new sandstone wall that formed a new front entrance for the stadium. In 1956, games from City Stadium were televised for the first time, with three games airing on CBS.

The seating capacity of the stadium peaked at 25,000 in 1956, the last season the Packers played there. The playing surface and location were praised, including being routinely voted as the best playing surface in the NFL. However, by the 1950s the facility had become out-of-date and not inline with the modern football stadiums of the era. Due to the high school and the East River, the site was physically constricted, making any additional expansion of City Stadium difficult. After the NFL pressured the Packers into either building a new stadium or moving to Milwaukee, Green Bay voters approved a bond to build a new stadium at a cost of approximately $1 million ($11.8 million in 2025). The new stadium was originally called "Green Bay City Stadium", although after the death of Curly Lambeau in 1965, the stadium was renamed to Lambeau Field. In 1962, the "Old City Stadium" was renamed to East Stadium. The final demolition of the Packers facilities that comprised "Old City Stadium" occurred in 1966 in front of former Packers players, including Jug Earp, Gus Rosenow, Boob Darling, John Martinkovic and John Des Jardin. The bleachers were reduced to a capacity of about 2,200 to better suit the needs of East High School, its remaining tenant.

The Packers were successful at City Stadium, posting a record of 88–41–7 in their 32 seasons there. This included six NFL championship winning seasons in 1929, 1930, 1931, 1936, 1939, and 1944. City Stadium never hosted a championship game though, with the only one occurring in Wisconsin during that time taking place in Milwaukee in 1939. The decision to play the game in Milwaukee, at the State Fair Park, instead of at City Stadium was controversial in Green Bay. Team officials, in coordination with the NFL, made the decision with the expectation that Milwaukee would produce higher attendance and ticket revenue. The decision paid off, with 32,279 people attending the game grossing over $83,000 ($1.92 million in 2025) at the gate, a record at the time. The stadium did host many memorable games and events, including celebrations honoring Packers legends like Curly Lambeau, Don Hutson, and Tony Canadeo. City Stadium also hosted an intrasquad game in 1949 that raised $50,000 ($676,573 in 2025) and helped keep the Packers afloat financially.

== Modern use ==
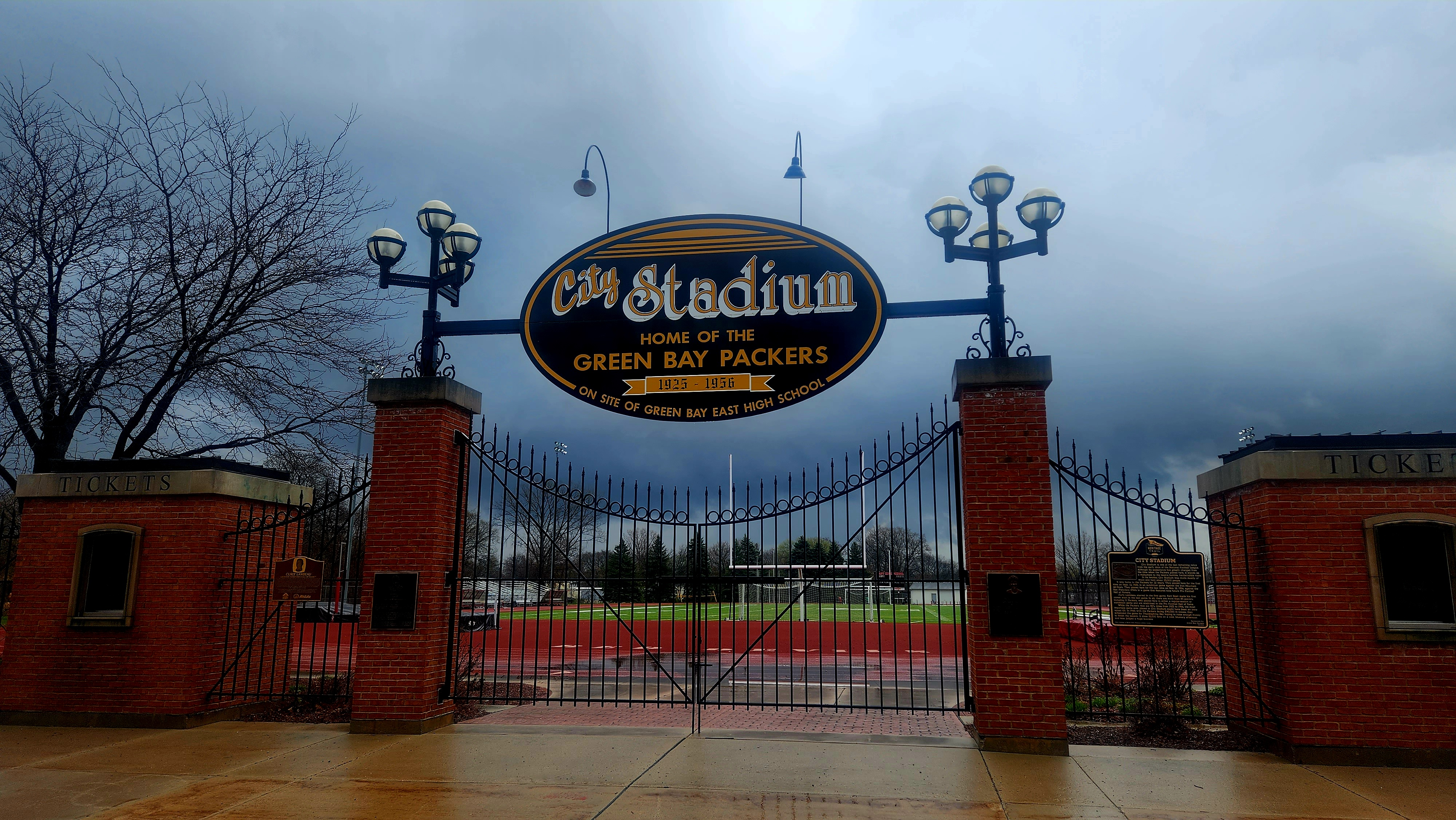
The entrance gate to City Stadium (shown here in 2024) includes the historic marker for the Packers Heritage Trail attached to the fence to the right of the gate.

East High School continued to use the facility after the Packers moved, including the 100th Green Bay East–Green Bay West rivalry game in 2005. As an observance of the 50th anniversary of the opening of Lambeau Field, the Packers held practice at City Stadium on July 31, 2007. In 2002, after a five-year effort by local residents, a $330,000 ($590,703 in 2025) renovation project was completed at the stadium. The two-phase project added new fencing, a brick and iron gate, a lighted sign noting the history of the stadium, two memorials, a new walkway, and additional landscaping. As part of the 2002 renovation, the facility regained its former name, City Stadium. Another renovation occurred in 2008 when East High School replaced the bleachers and added a new press box. Artificial turf replaced the grass field in 2017 at a cost of $880,000 ($1.16 million in 2025), which included a $200,000 ($262,693 in 2025) grant from the Green Bay Packers Foundation. A historic marker for the Packers Heritage Trail, an urban trail honoring the history of the Packers, was added in 2011.

== See also ==
- List of Green Bay Packers stadiums

Preceded by Bellevue Park	Home of the Green Bay Packers; 1925 – 1956	Succeeded by Lambeau Field
