= Russ Oltz =

American football player (1899–1956)

Russell Manning Oltz (March 19, 1899 – June 2, 1956) was a player in the National Football League (NFL) for the Hammond Pros from 1920 to 1925. He played at the collegiate level at the University of Illinois at Urbana-Champaign.

== Biography ==
Oltz was born Russell Manning Oltz on March 19, 1899, in Beloit, Wisconsin, and died on June 2, 1956, at age 57.
