= Hagemeister Park =

Sports stadium in Wisconsin, U.S.

Coordinates: 44°30′25″N 87°59′33.3″W

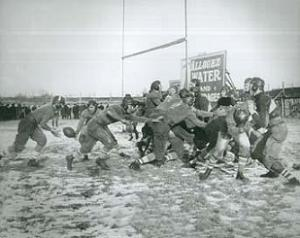
- A high school football game played at Hagemeister Park between Marinette and Watertown on December 8, 1917
- Interactive map of Hagemeister Park
- Location: Green Bay, Wisconsin, U.S.
- Owner: Hagemeister Brewery
- Surface: Natural Grass

Construction
- Demolished: 1923

Tenant
- Green Bay Packers (1919-22)

Hagemeister Park was a public park in Green Bay, Wisconsin, United States. It became notable as the first home of the Green Bay Packers, an American football team, from their founding in 1919 until 1922. The park was beside the East River, within the city limits. It was noted for its natural beauty and ease of access, making it a popular spot in Green Bay for outdoor activities. In the early 20th century it hosted carnivals, fairs, and vehicle racing. The park also served as a venue for multiple sports, including baseball and football.

When the Packers were formed in 1919, they used the park for their games. At the time, the park had no amenities and no seating, and attendance was free. Some fans would stand beside the field while others parked and sat on their cars for a better view. In 1920, bleachers and a fence were built, and the team began charging for admission. The sports facilities at the park were expanded to include a grandstand and additional bleachers, which were used by multiple baseball and football teams. In 1923, construction of Green Bay East High School began in the park, forcing the Packers to move their games to Bellevue Park. A few years later, City Stadium was built just north of Hagemeister Park; it was home to the Packers for over 30 years. A sign for the Packers Heritage Trail is the only remaining marker of Hagemeister Park.

== History ==
The history of Hagemeister Park likely dates back to at least 1896, when a baseball field was dedicated at what was then called Washington Park. In 1899, the Green Bay Press-Gazette noted various public activities occurring at the park, including theater, car racing, and baseball. The property was located adjacent to the East River in Green Bay, Wisconsin, and neighbored property owned by the Joannes Brothers, who operated a grocery retail business. In total, these two pieces of property accounted for 57 acres of parkland, with 19 of those acres in the Hagemeister portion. In 1906, the city of Green Bay discussed purchasing the property, with a newspaper article noting that Hagemeister Park was owned by Henry F. Hagemeister. The question of the city purchasing the property for use as a public park was put to the voters that year, but failed with 252 voting in favor and 1,659 voting against. It appears that the question was put to the voters for local leaders to understand their views on the purchase, but would not have been binding on the city administration to move forward with the purchase.

Baseball at Hagemeister Park included various independent league teams, while football included games by Green Bay West High School and Green Bay East High School. Some type of baseball stadium existed at the park in the early 1900s but was demolished in 1918. By 1906, the park had a half-mile race track and in 1914 it hosted a free carnival. In 1916, a skating rink was opened at the park and by 1917 an auditorium that fit 3,000 people had been built. The Hagemeister Realty Company invested approximately $20,000 ($502,597 in 2025) into various buildings at the park. During the early 20th century, the park at times featured a small lake and the city's first indoor roller rink, while buildings to support fairs were constructed and later removed. Packers historian Cliff Christl noted in a 2021 story that the park was "easily accessible by boat and street car" and that it "was considered one of the most beautiful spots in Green Bay and also its most popular gathering place." Adjacent to the park was a popular club house that included a ballroom, dining room, and bowling alley.

The city of Green Bay purchased the park from the Hagemeister Realty Company in 1921 for $80,000 ($1.44 million in 2025). The site of the park had been selected for a new Green Bay East High School, with state experts identifying it as the preferred site in 1920. Construction began in 1923, with the main building complete the next year. A historic marker for Hagemeister Park, part of the Packers Heritage Trail is located on Baird Street, adjacent to the school building.

== Green Bay Packers ==
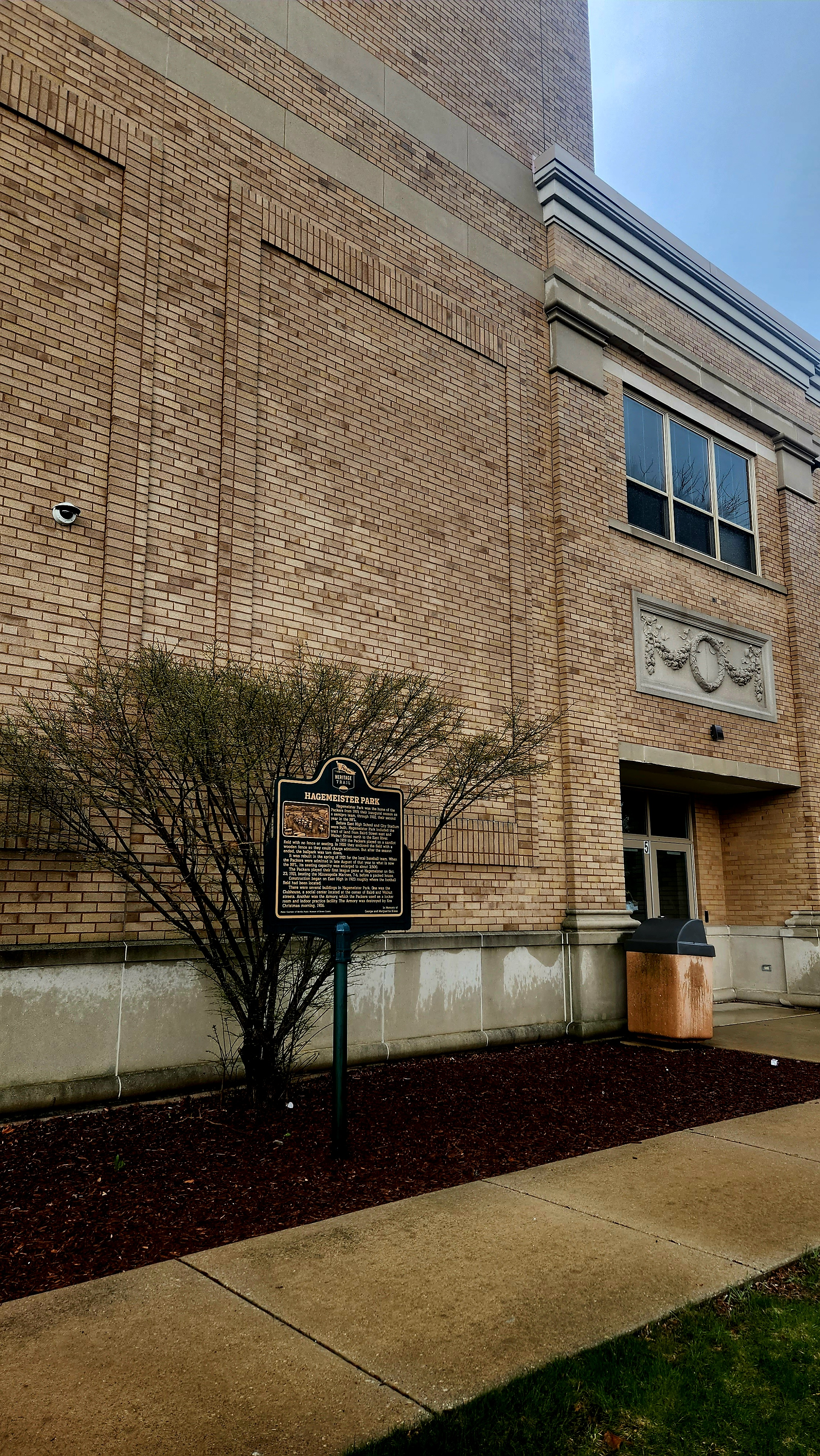
All that remains of Hagemeister Park is a marker next to the facade of Green Bay East High School.

In 1919, Curly Lambeau and George Whitney Calhoun founded a football team called the Green Bay Packers. In 1919 and 1920, the Packers played other teams from the Wisconsin region, before entering the American Professional Football Association (APFA) in 1921. A year later, the APFA was renamed the National Football League (NFL). During these early years, from 1919 to 1922, the Packers played their home games at Hagemeister Park. During their first season, Hagemeister Park had no amenities or seating, and attendance was free. Fans would often stand beside the field or sit in their parked cars to watch the game. In 1920, a fence was built around the playing field, allowing the Packers to charge for admission. Partway through the season, bleachers with a capacity of about 700 were built on the north side of the field. The next week, an additional 800-seat bleacher was built on the south side.

At the end of the season, per the lease agreement with Hagemeister Realty Company, the fence was taken down, with the lumber returned to the Indian Packing Company (which by that time had been acquired by the Acme Packing Company). Indian Packing Company was the original sponsor of the Packers and had provided the lumber for the fence, on the condition it be returned. In 1921, Green Bay was given a baseball franchise for a local amateur league, although one condition for the franchise was the requirement that the team have a playing field with a fence and grandstand. Acme Packing gave permission for the lumber to be reused, and a 1,100 person grandstand was built. Bleachers with a capacity of 700 more people and a fence were also constructed. When the 1921 NFL season started, seating capacity was expanded to 3,600, with the seating located on each side of the field. This configuration remained for the 1922 NFL season.

With the sale of Hagemeister Park and start of construction on the high school, the Packers moved their home games to Bellevue Park, a baseball stadium outside of town, for two seasons. They then moved to City Stadium, a football-specific stadium that had been added just north of the newly-built high school.

== See also ==
- List of Green Bay Packers stadiums

Preceded by First stadium	Home of the Green Bay Packers; 1919 – 1922	Succeeded by Bellevue Park
