= Johnny Murphy (coach) =

American basketball player and coach (1891–1961)

Personal information
- Born: October 8, 1891 Rochester, New York, U.S.
- Died: September 13, 1961 (aged 69) Brockport, New York, U.S.

Career information
- Playing career: 1912–1931
- Coaching career: 1925–1931

Career history

Playing
- 1925–1927: Rochester Centrals

Coaching
- 1925–1931: Rochester Centrals

John David Murphy (October 8, 1891 – September 13, 1961) was an American basketball player-coach for the Rochester Centrals from 1925 to 1931. Murphy played for the Centrals until 1927 and co-held the positions of head coach and general manager. Outside of the American Basketball League, Murphy was the head coach of the Rochester Jeffersons during the 1924 NFL season.

== Early life ==
Murphy was born on October 8, 1891, in Rochester, New York.

== Career ==
Murphy began his sports career as a basketball player for the Oswego Indians from 1912 to 1915 and the Baslow Globetrotters from 1915 to 1917. After briefly playing for the Mohawk Indians in 1919, Murphy joined the Rochester Centrals the same year while the team was independent. While playing for the Centrals, Murphy was the captain of the University of Rochester's basketball team in the 1920s and later became the team's coach. Although most of his career was in basketball, Murphy entered American football when he became the head coach of the Rochester Jeffersons in the 1924 NFL season. Murphy's record with the Jeffersons was 0 wins and 4 losses.

After leaving the NFL, Murphy joined the American Basketball League. He became a player-coach of the Rochester Centrals in 1925. As a player, Murphy played with the Centrals from 1925 to 1927. Alternatively, Murphy became the Centrals head coach and general manager in 1925. After his coaching career with the Centrals ended in 1931, Murphy had a career record of 72 wins and 86 losses. Outside of coaching, Murphy was an executive of the American Basketball League and a food columnist for a Rochester newspaper.

== Death ==
Murphy died on September 13, 1961, in Brockport, New York.
