= Dave Tallant =

American football player (1896–1948)

No. 3, 1
- Position: Tackle

Personal information
- Born: August 24, 1896; Murrysville, Pennsylvania, U.S.
- Died: December 13, 1948 (aged 52); Jacksonville, Illinois, U.S.
- Listed height: 6 ft 1 in (1.85 m)
- Listed weight: 205 lb (93 kg)

Career information
- High school: Wilkinsburg (PA)
- College: Grove City, Muskingum

Career history
- Hammond Pros (1921–1925)
- Stats at Pro Football Reference

David Tallant (August 24, 1896 – December 13, 1948) was an American professional football player for the Hammond Pros of the National Football League between 1921 and 1925. A tackle, he attended Grove City College and Muskingum University prior to playing professionally.
