= 1924 Green Bay Packers season =

NFL team season

- Owner: Green Bay Football Corporation
- Head coach: Curly Lambeau
- Home stadium: Bellevue Park

Results
- Record: 7–4 (NFL); 9–4 (overall)
- League place: 6th NFL

The 1924 Green Bay Packers season was their sixth season overall and their fourth season in the National Football League. The team finished with a 7–4 league record under player/coach Curly Lambeau earning them a sixth-place finish in the standings.

== Schedule ==
| Game | Date | Opponent | Result | Record | Venue | Attendance | Recap | Sources |
|---|---|---|---|---|---|---|---|---|
| — | September 14 | Ironwood Legion | W 15–0 | — | Bellevue Park | "biggest opening day crowd ever" | — | |
| — | September 21 | Chicago Bears | W 5–0 | — | Bellevue Park | 4000 | — | |
| 1 | September 28 | at Duluth Kelleys | L 3–6 | 0–1 | Athletic Park | 2,200 | Recap | |
| 2 | October 5 | at Chicago Cardinals | L 0–3 | 0–2 | Normal Park | 2,852 | Recap | |
| 3 | October 12 | Kansas City Blues | W 16–0 | 1–2 | Bellevue Park | 2,800 | Recap | |
| 4 | October 19 | Milwaukee Badgers | W 17–0 | 2–2 | Bellevue Park | 4,150 | Recap | |
| 5 | October 26 | Minneapolis Marines | W 19–0 | 3–2 | Bellevue Park | 2,500 | Recap | |
| 6 | November 2 | Racine Legion | W 6–3 | 4–2 | Bellevue Park | 4,000 | Recap | |
| 7 | November 9 | Duluth Kelleys | W 13–0 | 5–2 | Bellevue Park | 2,700 | Recap | |
| 8 | November 16 | at Milwaukee Badgers | W 17–10 | 6–2 | Athletic Park | 3,800 | Recap | |
| 9 | November 23 | at Chicago Bears | L 0–3 | 6–3 | Cubs Park | 6,000 | Recap | |
| 10 | November 27 | at Kansas City Blues | W 17–6 | 7–3 | Muehlebach Field | 1,542 | Recap | |
| 11 | November 30 | at Racine Legion | L 0–7 | 7–4 | Horlick Field | 2,200 | Recap | |
Note: Games in italics are exhibition games. Thanksgiving Day: November 27.

== Standings ==
NFL standings
| | W | L | T | PCT | PF | PA | STK |
|---|---|---|---|---|---|---|---|
| Cleveland Bulldogs | 7 | 1 | 1 | .875 | 229 | 60 | W2 |
| Chicago Bears | 6 | 1 | 4 | .857 | 136 | 55 | W3 |
| Frankford Yellow Jackets | 11 | 2 | 1 | .846 | 326 | 109 | W8 |
| Duluth Kelleys | 5 | 1 | 0 | .833 | 56 | 16 | W1 |
| Rock Island Independents | 5 | 2 | 2 | .714 | 88 | 38 | L1 |
| Green Bay Packers | 7 | 4 | 0 | .636 | 108 | 38 | L1 |
| Racine Legion | 4 | 3 | 3 | .571 | 69 | 47 | W1 |
| Chicago Cardinals | 5 | 4 | 1 | .556 | 90 | 67 | L1 |
| Buffalo Bisons | 6 | 5 | 0 | .545 | 120 | 140 | L3 |
| Columbus Tigers | 4 | 4 | 0 | .500 | 91 | 68 | L1 |
| Hammond Pros | 2 | 2 | 1 | .500 | 18 | 45 | W2 |
| Milwaukee Badgers | 5 | 8 | 0 | .385 | 142 | 188 | L2 |
| Akron Pros | 2 | 6 | 0 | .250 | 59 | 132 | W1 |
| Dayton Triangles | 2 | 6 | 0 | .250 | 45 | 148 | L6 |
| Kansas City Blues | 2 | 7 | 0 | .222 | 46 | 124 | L2 |
| Kenosha Maroons | 0 | 4 | 1 | .000 | 12 | 117 | L2 |
| Minneapolis Marines | 0 | 6 | 0 | .000 | 14 | 108 | L6 |
| Rochester Jeffersons | 0 | 7 | 0 | .000 | 7 | 156 | L7 |

Note: Tie games were not officially counted in the standings until 1972.

== Roster ==
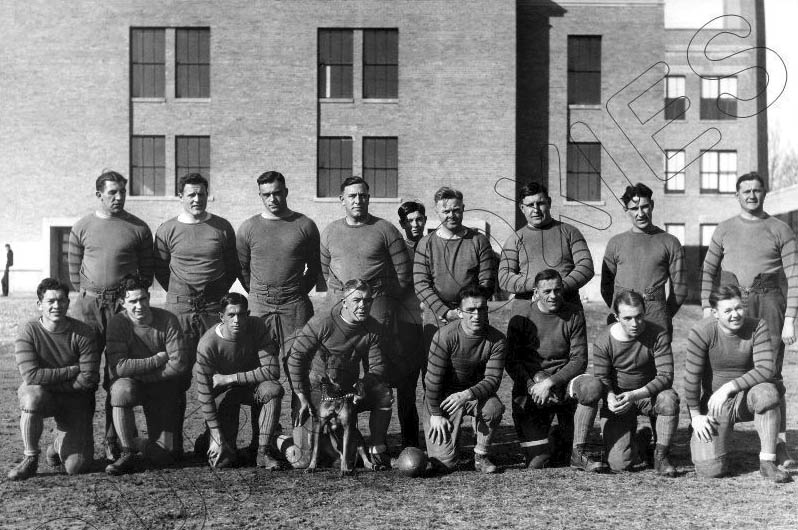
The 1924 Packers team.
