= Nash Field =

Football stadium in Kenosha, Wisconsin

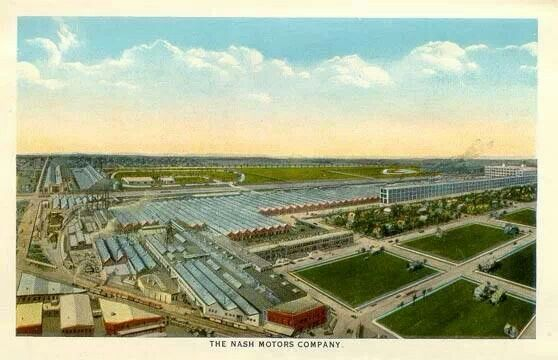
- Nash Employee's Athletic Field and Nash Motors, 1924
- Interactive map of Nash Field
- Full name: Nash Employee's Athletic Field
- Location: Kenosha, Wisconsin
- Coordinates: 42°35′10″N 87°50′36″W
- Operator: Kenosha Maroons
- Capacity: 5,000 (American football)
- Surface: Grass

Tenant
- Kenosha Maroons (NFL) (1924)

Nash Field is a former American football stadium located in Kenosha, Wisconsin. The stadium was home to the Kenosha Maroons of the National Football League in 1924. It had a capacity of 5,000 spectators. The stadium was built on the grounds of Nash Motors.
