= Bellevue Park (stadium) =

Sports stadium in Wisconsin, United States

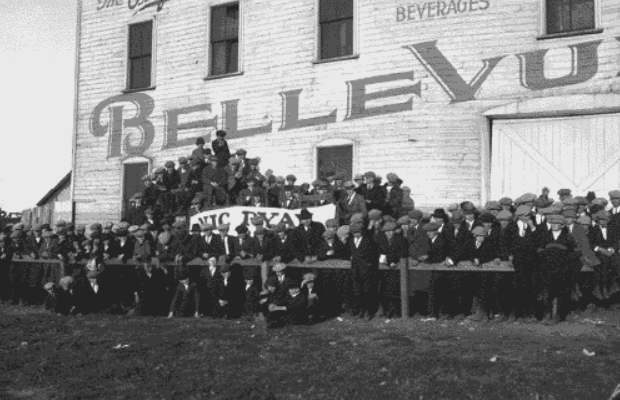
- Bellevue Park in 1923 or 1924
- Interactive map of Bellevue Park
- Location: Green Bay, Wisconsin, U.S.
- Coordinates: 44°30′15″N 87°59′2″W
- Capacity: 4,000 to 5,000
- Surface: Natural grass

Construction
- Opened: 1923
- Demolished: 1928

Tenant
- Green Bay Packers (1923–24)

Bellevue Park was a stadium used for baseball and American football in the town of Preble, Wisconsin, United States, which is now part of Green Bay, Wisconsin. The park was just east of the Hagemeister Brewery, which was renamed the Bellevue Food Products Co. during Prohibition. A baseball park for Green Bay's local and semipro teams, it was also the home of the Green Bay Packers of the National Football League (NFL) in 1923 and 1924.

Bellevue Park was the second home venue of the Packers, who had previously played their home games at Hagemeister Park. Because Bellevue Park was lacking almost everything needed for a football venue and was too far out of town, in 1925, the Packers moved their games to the then brand new City Stadium. Local and semipro baseball continued at Bellevue until 1928, when the park was demolished to make way for new commercial development.

== History ==
Bellevue Park was constructed in the spring of 1923 at the end of Main Street, taking about three weeks to build. Hagemeister Park, located on the other side of the East River from the Bellevue Park property, had recently been demolished to make way for a new Green Bay East High School. Hagemeister, at the time, had provided the home field for a semipro baseball team in the Wisconsin State League and for the Green Bay Packers, who played in the NFL. The day that Hagemeister began being demolished, the Bellevue Park site, which was part of the Hagemeister Food Products grounds, was selected. Wood from Hagemeister Park was reused to construct Bellevue Park, which housed about 1,700 fans for its first baseball game. It was noted in 1928 that the lumber for Bellevue Park had been reused numerous times to build different sports facilities.

In August 1923, the Packers announced that they would also play at the new Bellevue Park, although the facility was originally designed as a baseball field. It gained its name from Bellevue Ice Cream, which was produced by the Hagemeister Food Products company (formerly the Hagemeister Brewing Company prior to Prohibition). Hagemeister Food Products later changed its name to Bellevue Food Products Co. in 1929. Stadium capacity was expanded to be about 3,000, with the grandstand alone holding 1,600. This was later increased to 4,000, although larger crowd sizes were reported. The Packers played at Bellevue Park for two seasons in 1923 and 1924, accumulating a 9–2–1 record in 12 NFL games there. Their time at Bellevue included the first game where the Chicago Bears travelled to Green Bay and the first Packers' victory over the Bears.

Even with their success, Bellevue Park was not well regarded as a football field. Due to its design as a baseball stadium, there were physical constraints, including one end zone being three yards shorter than the other and the stands being too far from the field. Fans also complained the stadium was too far away from town and that there was not enough vehicle parking available. In 1925, City Stadium, a football-specific facility, was completed just north of where Hagemeister Park had been located. The Packers moved to City Stadium before the 1925 NFL season and played there until 1956.

Bellevue continued to host local and semipro baseball games until 1928, including the Green Sox who played in the Fox River valley baseball league. That year, the stadium was demolished to make way for new commercial businesses. Bellevue Park is part of the Packers Heritage Trail, which includes a historic marker and plaque describing its importance to the history of the Packers.

== See also ==
- List of Green Bay Packers stadiums

Preceded by Hagemeister Park	Home of the Green Bay Packers; 1923 – 1924	Succeeded by City Stadium
