= List of impostors =

List of people acting under false identity

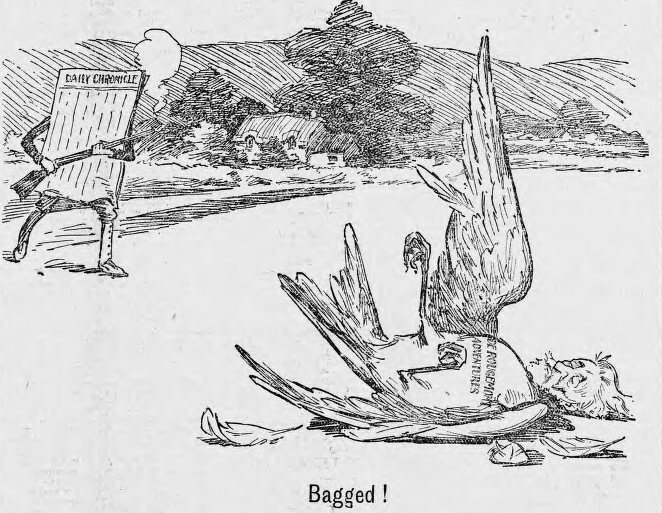
Cartoon of the would-be explorer Louis de Rougemont, who claimed to have had adventures in Australasia

An impostor (also spelled imposter) is a person who pretends to be somebody else, often through means of disguise, deceiving others by knowingly falsifying one or more aspects of their identity. This is in contrast to someone that honestly believes their false identity due to psychosis (break from reality), mistake (e.g. mistakenly switched at birth, or memory problems), or having been lied to about their identity by another (e.g. by a parent, or kidnapper).

== Reasons for imposture ==
Many impostors try to gain financial or social advantages through social engineering or through means of identity theft, but also often for purposes of espionage or undercover law enforcement. Their objective may be one of sexual gratification, giving a false name, false claim of being single or unwed, and/or false age in order to hide adultery, bigamy, or to catfish (e.g. a pedophile pretending to be a youth online).

Those in witness protection, those fleeing abusers or persecution, and criminals evading arrest may also assume a false identity.

Economic migrants may pose as tourists (visitor visas) or as international students (international student visas with a non-accredited university or college). In some countries, such as Canada, students from abroad on educational visas sometimes then present as asylum claimants to obtain residency or citizenship.

Some impostors may do it for pathological reasons, such as having a personality disorder that involves an excessive need for attention and emotional reactions from others (be it praise and/or sympathy), an excessive sense of self-importance or being special, an excessive sense of entitlement, an excessive need to control others, a lack of remorse or emotional empathy, chronic and frequent exaggeration or lying about one’s abilities or life events, and exploitativeness. These psychological conditions may include narcissistic personality disorder (NPD), antisocial personality disorder (psychopathy and sociopathy), Munchausen syndrome (factitious disorder imposed on self) and Munchausen-by-proxy (factitious disorder imposed on another).

According to forensic psychologist Ian Joblin, people who invent extraordinary life stories often do so to overcome feelings of inadequacy. By inventing an identity that embodies qualities admired within their culture, they seek validation, confidence, and influence. Such deceptions usually begin with small exaggerations that expand as they are accepted by others. As the fabricated narrative grows, it evolves to resolve inconsistencies, and the confabulator's insecurity may develop into an inflated sense of power and invulnerability.

People have also posed as others as a hoax or prank, sometimes for amusement, but also for publicity or as part of a protest, sometimes later revealing their true identity.

Many women in history have presented themselves as men in order to advance in typically male-dominated fields. There are many documented cases of this in the military during the American Civil War. However, their purpose was rarely for fraudulent gain. They are listed in the List of wartime cross-dressers.

Spies have often pretended to be people other than they were. One famous case was that of Chevalier d'Eon (1728–1810), a French diplomat who successfully infiltrated the court of Empress Elizabeth of Russia by presenting as a woman.

Historically, when military record-keeping was less accurate than today, some persons—primarily men—falsely claimed to be war veterans to obtain military pensions. Most did not make extravagant claims that would attract attention and possible exposure. In the modern world, falsely posing as a member of the military or exaggerating one's service record is almost always only to gain undeserved respect and admiration.

Scientists and filmmakers may also engage in imposture for the purposes of conducting a social experiment or public education; later revealing the deception to participants and public is a key part of the experiment. For instance, James Randi's Project Alpha; Derren Brown's Messiah, and Fear & Faith; and Vikram Gandhi's Kumaré.

== Notable impostors ==
=== False nationality claims ===
- Princess Caraboo (1791–1864), Englishwoman who pretended to be a princess from a fictional island
- Korla Pandit (1921–1998), African-American pianist/organist who pretended to be from India
- George Psalmanazar (1679–1763), who claimed to be from Taiwan
- Micheál Mac Liammóir (1899–1978), notable actor in Ireland, born in England as Alfred Willmore but falsified an Irish birth and identity

=== False minority national identity claims ===
- H. G. Carrillo (1960–2020), American writer and assistant professor of English at George Washington University who claimed to be a Cuban immigrant despite having been born in Detroit to American parents
- Asa Earl Carter (1925–1979), who under the alias of supposedly Cherokee writer Forrest Carter authored several books, including The Education of Little Tree
- Chief Buffalo Child Long Lance (1890–1932), an African American who claimed to be the son of a Blackfoot chief
- Iron Eyes Cody (1904–1999), Italian American actor (the "crying Indian chief" in the "Keep America Beautiful" public service announcements in the early 1970s), who claimed to be of Cherokee-Cree ancestry
- Helen Darville (born 1972), Australian writer who falsely claimed Ukrainian ancestry as part of the basis of her novel The Hand that Signed the Paper about a Ukrainian family who collaborated with Nazis in the Holocaust
- Misha Defonseca (born Monique de Wael, 1937) wrote a fraudulent autobiography in which she claimed to be a Jewish survivor of the Holocaust, when in fact she has no Jewish descent and was born to Catholic parents. Her book, Misha: A Mémoire of the Holocaust Years, received international fame. A documentary, Misha and the Wolves, detailing the investigation into the fraud, was released in 2021.
- Rachel Dolezal (born 1977), former president of the NAACP in Spokane, Washington, who claimed African-American heritage despite being born to white parents
- Grey Owl (1888–1938), born Archibald Belaney, an Englishman who took on the identity of an Ojibwe
- Jamake Highwater (1931–2001), writer and journalist, born Jackie Marks into an Ashkenazi family who later claimed he was a Cherokee American Indian
- Daniel Lewis James (1911–1988), novelist who wrote under the name Danny Santiago
- Jessica A. Krug (aka Jess La Bombalera, born 1982), former associate professor at George Washington University who falsely claimed African, African-American, and Caribbean-American heritage throughout her career, despite being born to Jewish parents
- Sacheen Littlefeather (Marie Louise Cruz, 1946–2022), model and activist who rejected Marlon Brando's Academy Award at the 1973 Oscars out of protest. Her Apache Indian impersonation was not made public until her funeral, when her sisters asserted their Mexican descent.
- BethAnn McLaughlin, neuroscientist who impersonated a bisexual Native American using the Twitter handle "@Sciencing_bi"
- Red Thunder Cloud (1919–1996), an African American who claimed to be the last speaker of the Catawba language
- Buffy Sainte-Marie (born 1941), an American singer-songwriter who claimed to be Canadian with Canadian Indigenous ancestry
- Andrea Smith, an American academic, feminist, and activist against violence who claimed Cherokee identity without proof or acceptance by the Cherokee nation
- Two Moon Meridas (c. 1888–1933), seller of herbal medicine who claimed that he was of Sioux birth
- Ulrich Schnaft (1923–2013), former Waffen-SS member who posed as a Jew in order to immigrate to Israel and escape post-war Germany. After immigrating in 1949 he joined the IDF. After getting discharged he moved back to Germany and became an Egyptian spy.

=== False royal heritage claims ===
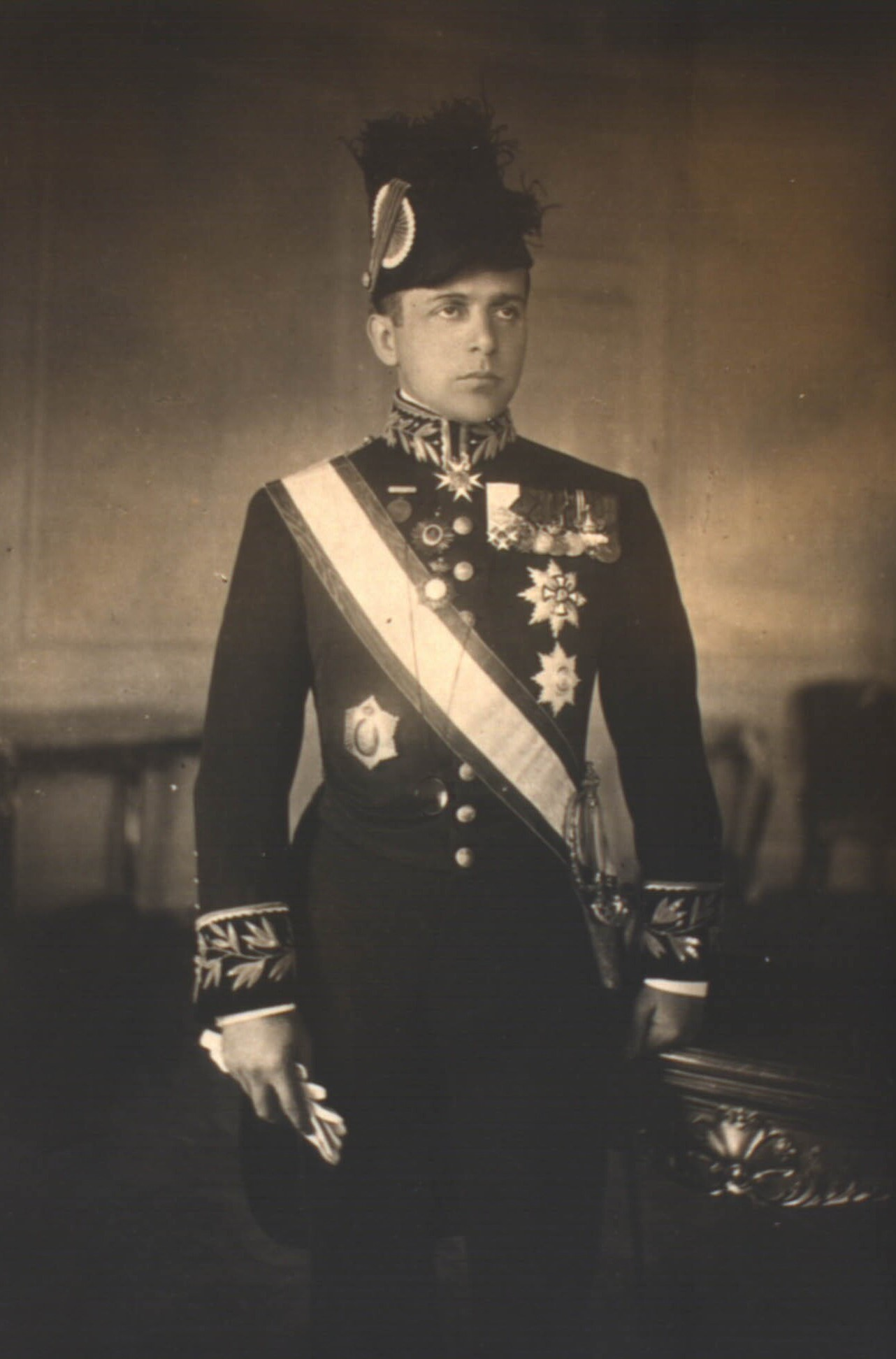
Frits Holm (1881–1930), Danish adventurer and self-styled "Duke of Colachine"

- Count Alexander of Montenegro (d. 1648) claimed to have been a brother of Mehmed III
- Maddess Aiort claimed to have been Grand Duchess Tatiana Nikolaevna of Russia
- Granny Alina claimed to have been Grand Duchess Maria Nikolaevna of Russia
- Michelle Anches claimed to have been Grand Duchess Tatiana of Russia
- Anna Anderson (1896–1984), who may have really believed she was the Grand Duchess Anastasia of Russia, daughter of Tsar Nicholas II of Russia
- Bardiya (d. 522 BC), ancient ruler of Persia, widely regarded as genuine but was claimed to be an imposter by his successor
- Mary Baynton (fl. c.1533), pretended to be Henry VIII's daughter, Mary at a time many considered that her father should be deposed in her favour
- Bhawal case, concerning a "resurrected" Indian prince who may have genuinely believed he was who he claimed to be
- Calixtus Ottomanus (d. 1496), alleged half-brother of Mehmed II, he was in contact with Pope Callixtus III and Holy Roman Emperor Maximilian I amongst others
- Natalya Bilikhodze (1900–2000), appeared in the year 1995 and went to Russia in the year 2000 where she tried to claim the "Romanov fortune" as Grand Duchess Anastasia of Russia, daughter of Tsar Nicholas II of Russia
- Marga Boodts, claimed to have been Grand Duchess Olga Nikolaevna of Russia
- Helga de la Brache (1817–1885), claimed to have been the secret legitimate daughter of Gustav IV Adolf of Sweden and Frederica of Baden
- Alexis Brimeyer (1946–1995), Belgian who claimed connection to various European royal houses
- Mary Carleton (1642–1673), who was, amongst other things, a false princess and bigamist
- Count Dante (1939–1975) is the assumed name of John Keehan, who claimed to be descended from Spanish nobility. In his campaign to promote his system of martial arts, he also claimed victories in various secret deathmatches in Asia, and mercenary activity in Cuba, none of which was proven.
- Suzanna Catharina de Graaff (1905–1968), was a Dutch woman who claimed to be the fifth daughter of Nicholas and Alexandra, born in 1903 when Alexandra was reported to have had a "hysterical pregnancy". There are no official or private records of Alexandra giving birth to any child at this time.
- Pseudo-Constantine Diogenes, pretended to be a son of Byzantine emperor Romanos IV Diogenes
- False Dmitriy I (c. 1581 – 1606), False Dmitriy II (died 1610), and False Dmitriy III (died 1612), who all impersonated the son of Ivan the Terrible
- Harry Domela (1905 – after 1978), who pretended to be an heir to the German throne
- Anna Ekelöf (fl. 1765), claimed to have been Crown Prince Gustav of Sweden
- Anthony Gignac (1970), falsely took on the identity of Saudi prince Khalid bin Al Saud to entrap victims in investment scams and other schemes, currently serving an 18 year jail sentence
- Michael Goleniewski (1922–1993), was a CIA agent who in the year 1959 claimed to be Tsarevich Alexei of Russia
- Anna Gyllander (fl. 1659), claimed to have been Queen Christina of Sweden
- Anatoly Ionov claims to be the son of Grand Duchess Anastasia Nikolaevna of Russia
- Tile Kolup (d. 1285), also known as Dietrich Holzschuh, an impostor who in 1284 began to pretend to be the Emperor Frederick II
- Eugenio Lascorz (1886–1962), who claimed connection to the royal house of the Byzantine Empire
- Terence Francis MacCarthy (born 1957), styled himself MacCarthy Mór and "Prince of Desmond"
- Šćepan Mali (d. 1773), who claimed to be Peter III of Russia, and managed to rule Montenegro
- False Margaret (c. 1260–1301), who impersonated the Maid of Norway
- Emperor Norton (1818–1880) self-proclaimed "Emperor of the United States and Protector of Mexico"
- Pierre Plantard (1920–2000), the mastermind behind the Priory of Sion hoax who claimed to be Merovingian, a pretender to the throne of France
- Princess Tarakanova, claimed to be the daughter of Alexei Razumovsky and Empress Elizabeth of Russia
- Yemelyan Pugachev (c. 1742–1775), who claimed to be Peter III of Russia
- Raiktor (fl. 1081), an Eastern Orthodox monk who assumed the identity of Byzantine Emperor Michael VII
- Frederick Rolfe (1860–1913), better known as Baron Corvo
- Lambert Simnel (c. 1477 – c. 1525), pretender to the throne of England
- Eugenia Smith (1899–1997), another woman who claimed to be the Grand Duchess Anastasia of Russia
- Charles Stopford, claimed to be the Earl of Buckingham
- Heino Tammet, claimed to be Tsarevich Alexei of Russia. He died in 1977 in Vancouver, Canada.
- Pseudo-Theodosius (fl. c.605), claimed to be Byzantine Emperor Theodosius and was supported by Khosrow II leading to the Byzantine–Sasanian War of 602–628
- Larissa Tudor, appeared strikingly similar to Grand Duchess Tatiana Nikolaevna of Russia but never actually claimed to be the former grand duchess. Many people who knew Larissa strongly suspected that she was the former grand duchess of Russia.
- Nadezhda Vasilyeva, appeared in the 1920s in Russia and claimed to be Grand Duchess Anastasia of Russia. She died in a psychiatric ward in 1971 in Kazan, Russia.
- Perkin Warbeck (c. 1474 – 1499), pretender to the throne of England
- False Olaf, who claimed to be Olaf II of Denmark
- Charin, who claimed to be Norodom Ekcharin, a Cambodian prince who went missing during the Khmer Rouge, was initially accepted but later expelled.
- Pseudo-Hisham (d. 1044), who claimed to be Hisham II and managed to gain limited recognition as the Caliph of Córdoba

=== Fraudsters ===
- Frank Abagnale (born 1948), who passed bad checks as a fake pilot
- Joseph Ady (1770–1852), notorious English impostor and postal fraudster
- Gerald Barnbaum (1933–2018), former pharmacist who posed as a doctor for over twenty years, assuming the identities of various licensed physicians
- Alessandro Cagliostro (1743–1795), Italian adventurer and self-styled magician
- Cassie Chadwick (1857–1907), who pretended to be Andrew Carnegie's daughter
- Ravi Desai, (active 1996–2002), a journalist who posed as Robert Klinger, fictitious chief executive officer of BMW's North American division, in a series of articles for Slate magazine
- Belle Gibson (born 1991), an Australian alternative wellness advocate who falsely claimed to have survived multiple cancers without using conventional cancer treatments
- David Hampton (1964–2003), who pretended to be the son of Sidney Poitier
- Joseph "Harry" Jelinek (1905–1986), who is alleged to have fraudulently sold the Karlstejn Castle to American industrialists
- Brian Kim (born 1975/1976), lived in Christodora House in Manhattan, falsified documents identifying himself as the president-secretary of its condo association, and transferred $435,000 from the association's bank account to his own bank account
- Sante Kimes (1934–2014), impersonated various public figures and was convicted of murdering her own landlady, wealthy socialite Irene Silverman, in an apparent plot to assume Silverman's identity
- Mandla Lamba, "fake billionaire" from South Africa who received media attention by claiming to be a successful mining tycoon.
- Victor Lustig (1890–1947), "The man who sold the Eiffel Tower. Twice."
- Richard Allen Minsky (born 1944), who lured women into vulnerable situations by pretending to be people they knew, then lawyers representing them, and then raped them
- Arthur Orton (1834–1898), also known as the Tichborne Claimant, who claimed to be the missing heir Sir Roger Tichborne
- Paul Palaiologos Tagaris (c. 1320/40 – after 1394), Orthodox monk, claimed to be a member of the Palaiologos dynasty, pretended to be the Orthodox Patriarch of Jerusalem, later succeeded in being named Latin Patriarch of Constantinople
- Frederick Emerson Peters (1885–1959), U.S. celebrity impersonator and writer of bad checks
- Gert Postel (born 1958), a mail carrier who posed as a medical doctor
- Lobsang Rampa (1910–1981), formerly plumber Cyril Hoskins, who claimed to be possessed by the spirit of a deceased Tibetan lama and wrote a number of books based on that premise
- James Reavis (1843–1914), master forger who used his real name but created a complex, fictitious history that pointed to him as the rightful owner of much of Arizona
- Anna Sorokin (born 1991), posed as a fictitious wealthy heiress to fraudulently obtain loans, luxury goods, travel, and stays at exclusive hotels
- Leander Tomarkin (1895–1967), fake doctor who became the personal physician of Victor Emmanuel III of Italy, and convinced Albert Einstein to assume the honorary presidency of one of his medical conferences
- Sally and Timothy Walker, married couple represented in Sally's memoir (published under the name Raynor Winn) The Salt Path, which was later alleged to be largely misrepresented.

=== Military impostors ===
- Joseph A. Cafasso (born 1956), former Fox News military analyst who claimed to have been a highly decorated U.S. Army Special Forces soldier and Vietnam War veteran, but actually served in the army for only 44 days in 1976
- Brian Dennehy (1938–2020), American actor who enlisted in the United States Marine Corps in 1958, served in Okinawa, and never saw combat, but later falsely claimed to have been wounded in action in the Vietnam War
- George Dupre (1903–1982), who claimed that he worked for the Special Operations Executive (SOE) and the French Resistance during World War II (WWII); Dupre served in World War II, but he was never in France, nor with the SOE
- Frank Dux (born 1956), Canadian-American martial artist who served in the United States Marine Corps Reserve in non-combat roles, but claimed in his memoir The Secret Man that he had fought in covert Central Intelligence Agency (CIA) special operations in Southeast Asia, Nicaragua, the Iran–Iraq War and the Gulf War; his claims drew a rare public denial from the CIA describing them as "preposterous".
- Joseph Ellis (born 1943), American professor and historian who claimed a tour of duty in the Vietnam War, but who actually obtained an academic deferral of service and then taught history at West Point
- Jack Livesey (born 1954), British historian, military advisor on film productions, and author who claimed to have a distinguished twenty-year career in the Parachute Regiment, but actually served as a cook in the Army Catering Corps for three years
- Jesse Macbeth (born 1984), anti-war activist who claimed to be a United States Army Ranger and veteran of the Iraq War, but was actually discharged from the army before completing basic training
- Joseph McCarthy (1908–1957), U.S. senator who served in the Marine Corps during World War II as a Douglas SBD Dauntless tail gunner; broadly embellished his military accomplishments, notably by exaggerating his number of combat missions flown, falsifying official records to reflect these claims, obtaining combat decorations based on the falsified documents, and claiming that he broke his leg in action when the injury was sustained in a non-combat stairwell fall
- Alan Mcilwraith (born 1978), a call centre worker from Glasgow who, among other things, claimed that he was a decorated captain in the British Army; he never served in the military
- Sgt. Slaughter (born 1948 as Robert Remus), a professional wrestler with the gimmick of being a former U.S. Marine who fought in the Vietnam War, but never served in the military. Despite this, he has talked about military service while seeming to be speaking as himself, and not in kayfabe character.
- Eric von Stroheim, film director (The Merry Widow, 1925) and actor (Sunset Boulevard, 1950), who claimed to have been an Austrian imperial military officer, but never served in the military. He did portray German officers on-screen.
- Friedrich Wilhelm Voigt (1849–1922), German impostor who masqueraded as a Prussian officer in 1906 and became famous as "The Captain of Köpenick"
- Micah Wright (born 1974), anti-war activist who claimed to have been an Army Ranger involved in the United States invasion of Panama and several special operations; he was a Reserve Officers' Training Corps student in college, but never served in the military

=== Multiple impostors ===
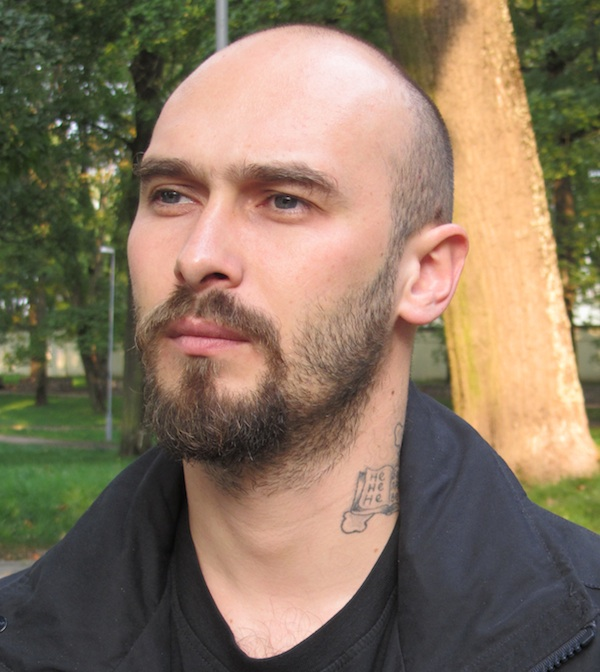
Nicolai Lilin

- Frédéric Bourdin (born 1974), "the French Chameleon"
- Barry Bremen (1947–2011), known in the sports world as "The Great Imposter", after pretending to be an MLB umpire, an NBA All-Star, and a Dallas Cowboys Cheerleader, among other things
- Ferdinand Waldo Demara (1921–1982), "The Great Impostor", who masqueraded as many people, from monks to surgeons to prison wardens
- Christian Gerhartsreiter (born 1961), a serial impostor and convicted murderer who infamously posed as a member of the Rockefeller family and became the subject of several books
- Marvin Hewitt (1922–1991), who impersonated several academics and became a university physics professor
- Stanley Clifford Weyman (1890–1960), American multiple impostor who impersonated public officials, including the U.S. Secretary of State and various military officers
- Laurel Rose Willson (1941–2002), who claimed to be "Lauren Stratford", a victim of satanic ritual abuse, and later as Holocaust survivor "Laura Grabowski"
- Mamoru Samuragochi (born 1963), who claimed to be a "deaf composer", though it was later revealed that his hearing ability has already improved and most of his works were written by Takashi Niigaki, conductor of "Onimusha Soundtrack", produced by Samuragouchi.
- Nicolai Lilin (born 1980), an Italian-Moldovan writer who claimed to be the descendent of a Siberian ethnic group deported by the Soviet Union to Bender, Moldova in the 1930s, despite being of Polish origin and Bender having not been in the USSR at that time. He also claimed to be a veteran of the Second Chechen War, despite his name not appearing in any sources close to the Russian Ministry of Defence.

=== Hoaxes ===
There have been a great many notable hoaxes; only a few are listed.

- In the Dreadnought hoax, Horace de Vere Cole and members of the Bloomsbury Group, in make-up and costume posing as members of Abyssinian royalty, in 1910 persuaded the Royal Navy to invite them to inspect the fleet and its flagship, the battleship HMS Dreadnought. When the hoax was revealed, de Vere Cole contacted the press and sent newspapers a photograph of the "princes". The group's pacifist views embarrassed the Navy, which was ridiculed, and demanded that Cole be arrested; but the group had broken no laws.

=== Others ===
- Bampfylde Moore Carew (1693–1759), a Devonshire man whose popular Life and Adventures included picaresque episodes of vagabond life, including his claim to have been elected King of the Beggars
- Alan Conway (1934–1998), who impersonated Stanley Kubrick during the early 1990s
- Misha Defonseca (born 1937) Belgian Catholic woman who took the identity of a Jewish Holocaust survivor
- Alicia Esteve Head (born 1973), Spanish woman who claimed to be a survivor of the September 11 attacks, under the name Tania Head
- James Frey (born 1969) American writer who presented himself as a reformed convict and drug addict, who in actuality had no criminal record
- Dolly Gray impostor, an unidentified imposter who played for the St. Louis All-Stars and Green Bay Packers during the 1923 National Football League (NFL) season.
- Martin Gray (1921–2016), Polish Jew who falsely claimed to have been imprisoned in Treblinka extermination camp
- Kaspar Hauser (1812–1833), German youth who claimed to have grown up in the total isolation of a darkened cell
- Robert Hendy-Freegard (born 1971), English barman, car salesman and conman who masqueraded as a MI5 agent
- James Hogue (born 1959), who entered Princeton University by posing as a self-taught orphan
- Paul Jordan-Smith (1885–1971), father of the hoax art movement called Disumbrationism
- Rahul Ligma, who pretended to be a fired Twitter employee, pranking major media outlets in 2022
- Enric Marco (1921–2022), Spaniard who claimed to have been a prisoner in the Nazi German concentration camps Mauthausen and Flossenburg in World War II
- Brian MacKinnon (born c. 1963), who at the age of thirty attended Bearsden Academy by posing as a teenager
- Rosemarie Pence (born 1938), American woman who falsely claimed to have been a German Jew imprisoned at Dachau concentration camp, and told her stories in an authorized biography Hannah: From Dachau to the Olympics and Beyond
- Stephen Rannazzisi (born 1978), American actor and comedian who claimed to be a survivor of the September 11 attacks
- Steven Jay Russell (born 1957), who has impersonated judges and a doctor, among others, and is known for escaping from prison multiple times
- George Santos (born 1988), Brazilian-American elected to the U.S. House of Representatives in 2022 claiming to be a college-educated financier, philanthropist and real estate investor as well as Jewish and the grandson of Holocaust survivors, who later admitted that he fabricated most of his résumé
- Arnaud du Tilh (1524–1560), who took the place of Martin Guerre in the mid-16th century and lived with Guerre's wife and son for three years before being discovered when Guerre returned
- Donald J. Watt (1918–2000), Australian soldier who claimed to have been a Sonderkommando at Auschwitz concentration camp
- Binjamin Wilkomirski (born 1941), who adopted a constructed identity as a Holocaust survivor and published author
- Gabriel Wortman (1968–2020), Canadian denturist who masqueraded as a police officer and drove a bogus Royal Canadian Mounted Police cruiser while perpetrating the 2020 Nova Scotia attacks
- Anonymous members of the street theatre group Grevillea (unknown), posed as 'Elizabeth Lean' and other members of LILAC WA (Ladies In Line Against Communism WA; actually an extant sub-group of the quasi-fascist League of Rights) in the 1980s during a series of publicity stunts which fooled some journalists and led to coverage of the group's messages regarding billionaire Alan Bond, who was later imprisoned for fraud.

== See also ==
- Catfishing
- Charlatan
- Fake memoir
- Famous Impostors – 1910 book by Bram Stoker
- Miriam Coles Harris
- Misery literature
- Identity theft
- Impersonator
- Impostor syndrome
- Messiah claimant
- Political decoy
- Poseur
- Pretendian
- Wilkomirski syndrome
