= Ollie Kraehe =

American football player (1898–1966)

Profile
- Positions: Guard, Center, End, Head Coach, Owner

Personal information
- Born: August 22, 1898; St. Louis, Missouri, United States
- Died: November 2, 1969 (aged 71)
- Listed height: 5 ft 10 in (1.78 m)
- Listed weight: 180 lb (82 kg)

Career information
- College: Washington University in St. Louis

Career history

Playing
- 1922: Rock Island Independents
- 1923: St. Louis All-Stars

Coaching
- 1923: St. Louis All-Stars

manager/owner
- 1923: St. Louis All-Stars
- Coaching profile at Pro Football Reference
- Stats at Pro Football Reference

Oliver Robert Kraehe (August 22, 1898 – December 19, 1966) was a professional football player for the Rock Island Independents in 1922. In 1923, he founded the St. Louis All Stars and served, not only as a player-coach, but as the team's manager and owner.

== St. Louis All-Stars ==
Kraehe began his pro football career in 1923 as a substitute offensive lineman playing for the Rock Island Independents. Ollie Kraehe figured that if small towns markets, like Green Bay and Rock Island, could be successful operating a professional football, then operating in a larger market, like St. Louis would bring in even more income. For this reason, Kraehe decided to start his own franchise. He was a local football hero in St. Louis since he had played college football at Washington University in St. Louis, alongside Jimmy Conzelman and had captained the school's 1921 team.

In 1923, NFL President Joe Carr gave Kraehe an NFL franchise. He paid $100 for the franchise and began organizing a team, about a month before the 1923 season was to start. He also named his club the "All-Stars", however he soon discovered that there was a lack of All-American talent available. Many of the players were locals who came from St. Louis University and Washington University in St. Louis. He was able to sign college All-Americans Bub Weller and Dick King.

Kraech also was able to sign an agreement with the St. Louis Browns that allowed them to use Sportsman's Park as their home field.

At the end of the 1923 season, Kraech and the All-Stars lost over $3,600. The following September, the National Football League canceled the All-Stars franchise.

== Jack Gray ==
After the All-Stars second game with the Packers, Ollie Kraehe traded a man who claimed to be Howdy Gray, a former All-American end from Princeton for cash to Curly Lambeau and the Packers. It appeared as if Kraehe (who was in financial distress) had sold one of his best players. This player, however, was not Howdy Gray, but "Jack Gray", an impostor who never played at Princeton. Lambeau discovered this after watching his new end perform so badly the next game, that he addressed Kraehe on the matter. Kraehe told Lambeau that trading away the impostor was meant as a "joke" and that he would return the money paid for Gray to Lambeau.
