= Hal Wilder =

American football player (1893–1989)

Profile
- Position: Guard

Personal information
- Born: February 8, 1893; Merrick, Nebraska, U.S.
- Died: February 5, 1989 (aged 95); Lincoln, Nebraska, U.S.
- Listed height: 5 ft 10 in (1.78 m)
- Listed weight: 175–190 lb (79–86 kg)

Career information
- High school: Central City (NE)
- College: Nebraska Wesleyan, Nebraska

Career history
- St. Louis All-Stars (1923)

Career statistics
- Games played: 1
- Games started: 1
- Stats at Pro Football Reference

Harold Fremont "Hal" Wilder (February 8, 1893 – February 5, 1989) was an American football guard who played one season for the St. Louis All-Stars of the National Football League (NFL). He lived to be 95, and was believed to be the last living player from the All-Stars' franchise at the time of his death, as the only other player who could have been living at the time was the Dolly Gray impostor, whose birth and death dates were unknown.

== Early life and education ==
Harold "Hal" Wilder was born on February 8, 1893, in Merrick, Nebraska. He went to Central City High School in Nebraska. Wilder went to two colleges, Nebraska Wesleyan University and the University of Nebraska. While many players from Nebraska played in the NFL, Wilder was one of only 4 Nebraska Wesleyan attendees to ever play professionally. He also served in the U.S. Army during World War I.

== Professional career ==
Wilder played in one game for the St. Louis All-Stars in 1923. He played the guard position. He was reported to be 5 feet, 10 inches tall, and weighed between 175 and 190 pounds in his only season. The next season, the St. Louis All-Stars folded, and Wilder did not play another game. No statistics were recorded besides that he appeared in and started the game.

== Death ==
He died on February 5, 1989, at the age of 95 in Lincoln, Nebraska. His death was only 3 days before his 96th birthday. He was believed to be the longest-living All-Stars player, as well as the last living player. The only former All-Stars player who could have been still living at the time of his death was the Dolly Gray impostor, whose birth and death dates are unknown.
