= Ljuba Manz-Lurje =

Ukrainian-born Swiss businesswoman

- Любовь Манц Лурье
- Born: Ljubov Lurje; 1940 (age 84–85); Kharkiv, Ukrainian SSR, Soviet Union (now Ukraine)
- Citizenship: Switzerland; Russia
- Spouses: Caspar E. Manz (m. 1974; died 2010) Marco Conte (m. 2014)
- Children: 2

Ljubov Manz-Lurje (Russian: Любовь Манц Лурье née Lurje; born 1940) is a Ukrainian-born Swiss businesswoman who is primarily known for being the controlling shareholder of Manz Privacy Hotels in Switzerland. She is a Russian and Swiss dual citizen.

== Personal life ==
Manz relocated to Switzerland around 1968 according to different sources either due to her first husband who was a fishmonger (she was often referred to as oyster salesperson) but to her own reference she studied in Zurich. On 14 August 1974, she married recently widowed Caspar E. Manz (1923-2010), a well-known and wealthy hotelier from Zurich, with whom she had two sons, twins Alexander and Michael (born 1980).

On 15 August 2014, Manz married Dr. Marco Conte (born 1972), at the town hall of Zollikon near Zurich.
