= Stanley Weyman =

Stanley Weyman may refer to:

- Stanley J. Weyman (1855–1928), English novelist
- Stanley Clifford Weyman (1890–1960), American multiple impostor
