= Leander Tomarkin =

Swiss impostor (1895–1967)

Leander William Tomarkin (13 December 1895 – 1967) was a Swiss impostor who claimed to possess a doctorate in medicine, as well as to have invented a miracle medicine for the cure of typhus, tuberculosis, meningitis, and malaria. He ascended to become the personal physician of Victor Emmanuel, king of Italy, and he convinced Albert Einstein to become patron of a conference organised by him.

== Early life ==
Leander Tomarkin was born on 13 December 1895 in Zollikon, Switzerland. A doctor's son, he was the black sheep of the family, obtaining bad results at school and dropping a chemistry degree at college. He also soon developed a reputation of dishonesty. He did not take up regular employment but spent his time in his father's laboratory, hoping to invent something.

Tomarkin rose to fame when he offered to cure Pope Benedict XV's pneumonia in January 1922. The Pope died without Tomarkin being allowed to treat him but reporters subsequently picked up the story and enabled the progress of Tomarkin's medical career with publicising his Antimicrobum tomarkin medicine, whose active ingredient he named Aminoortobenzoilsulfoisoamiloidrocupronucleinforminsodico. The Antimicrobum was to reduce pneumonia mortality from about one third to 2%. Tomarkin was allowed to treat a cousin of Victor Emmanuel III of Italy, and the cousin recovered. As a result, the king named Tomarkin the personal physician of the family. A clinical test at the Santo Spirito hospital in Rome was also successful, later attributed to the better care for test patient and the relatively early stage of pneumonia that the patients were in.

== Tomarkin-Foundation Chemistry Research ==
In May 1924 Tomarkin emigrated to the United States, and three years later founded Tomarkin-Foundation Chemistry Research. At this research centre he developed Catalysan and Disulphamin, claiming that these medicines bring about mood changes and treat sickness in that way. The Tomarkin Foundation soon spread to Europe. Its dependency in Locarno started to organise conferences between 1930 and 1938. These conferences were set beautifully and had rich side programs and thus attracted prominent people such as surgeon Ferdinand Sauerbruch. In 1931 Albert Einstein assumed the honorary presidency of the conference. Einstein only stayed in that position for one year, after a former landlady of Tomarkin contacted him to help retrieve debts.

At the onset of World War II Tomarkin again emigrated to the US, due to his Jewish ancestry. With the development of industrially manufactured antibiotics in 1939 his medical invention became obsolete. He ventured into other areas, trying to invent waterproof paint and synthetic diamonds but was unsuccessful with both. Tomarkin died in 1967.

== See also ==
- List of impostors
