= Barry Bremen =

American imposter and salesman (1947–2011)

- Born: Barry Bremen; June 30, 1947; Detroit, Michigan, US
- Died: June 30, 2011 (aged 64); Phoenix, Arizona, US
- Occupation: Insurance salesman/marketing executive/novelty goods salesman
- Years active: 1979–1986
- Known for: Prolific sports impersonations
- Height: 6 ft 4 in (1.93 m)
- Title: The Great Imposter
- Spouse: Margo
- Children: at least 36

Barry Bremen (June 30, 1947 – June 30, 2011) was an American imposter and salesman known in American sports as The Great Imposter. From 1979 to 1986, Bremen posed as a Major League Baseball umpire in the World Series, a player in a Major League Baseball All-Star Game, a player in a National Basketball Association All-Star Game, a referee in the National Football League, a Dallas Cowboys cheerleader, and a professional golfer. He also posed as an Emmy Award recipient.

Bremen was a self-proclaimed jock who regularly played touch football, basketball, and softball. His wife Margo, in a 1980 People magazine profile of the imposter, said Bremen was "fulfilling a grand fantasy to be in the limelight". He is known to have been the biological donor father of at least 36 children.

== Impersonations ==
=== Basketball ===
On February 4, 1979, Bremen donned a Kansas City Kings uniform and got onto the floor during pre-game warmups for the NBA All-Star Game at the Pontiac Silverdome. He took several shots before being recognized as an intruder. Bremen repeated that act in a Houston Rockets uniform at the 1981 All-Star Game at the Richfield Coliseum.

=== Baseball ===
On July 17, 1979, with the help of telecaster Dick Schaap and Kansas City Royals third baseman George Brett, Bremen snuck onto the field dressed in a New York Yankees uniform at the Major League Baseball All-Star Game, held at the Seattle Kingdome. Bremen shagged flies in the outfield for a half-hour and took a group picture with the team. Bremen was finally spotted and ushered off the field. He tried again, hiding out in the Mariners clubhouse whirlpool bath, until Seattle Mariners (and AL) trainer Gary Nicholson had him ejected from the premises.

In 1986, wearing a New York Mets uniform, Bremen again shagged flies in the outfield during the All-Star pre-game at the Houston Astrodome, when he was discovered and berated by NL All-Star coach and LA Dodgers manager Tommy Lasorda. After, Bremen was quoted as saying he was treated so poorly in jail that the all-star game stunt would be his last, and it was.

=== Football ===
On December 16, 1979, Bremen posed as a Dallas Cowboys cheerleader at a Cowboys-Redskins game held at Texas Stadium in Irving, Texas. In preparation, Bremen lost 23 pounds (10 kg), practiced drag routines with his wife, had a replica Dallas Cowboys cheerleader uniform custom-made, shaved his legs and spent $1,200 of his own money. During the game, Bremen burst onto the sidelines in boots, hot pants, falsies and a blond wig. He got out only one cheer – "Go Dallas!" – before Cowboys security had him handcuffed. The Cowboys filed a $5,000 lawsuit for trespassing and creating a nuisance, and petitioned to have him banned from Cowboys games for life. In 1981, Bremen posed as a line judge referee at Super Bowl XV at the Louisiana Superdome in New Orleans. In 1982, Bremen, dressed as the San Diego Chicken, was stopped from entering Super Bowl XVI at the Pontiac Silverdome.

=== Golf ===
At the 1979 U.S. Open, Bremen (who had a 7 handicap) sneaked on to Inverness Club in Toledo, Ohio, and played a practice round with Wayne Levi and Jerry Pate. He returned at the 1980 U.S. Open at the Baltusrol Golf Club, where he played so poorly in a practice round that a spectator asked the United States Golf Association's P.J. Boatwright, Jr. how such a lousy golfer had made it through qualifying.

In 1985, Bremen played a practice round with Fred Couples, Jay Haas, and Curtis Strange at the U.S. Open at the Oakland Hills Country Club in Bloomfield Hills, Michigan. Scouting the course early in the week, Bremen was introduced to Couples. An Oakland Hills member who was a friend of Bremen's smuggled Bremen's clubs and caddie into the club. Bremen, wearing a disguise and claiming to be a qualifier named Mark Diamond, went in search of Couples, who was playing a practice round with Haas. At the 10th hole, Strange and Bob Eastwood joined the group. Bremen claimed to have shot a 77. Bremen said that out of all of his stunts, he was proudest of his golf antics.

=== Emmy Awards ===
At the 1985 Emmy Awards in Pasadena, Bremen suddenly arose from a front-row seat and accepted from a confused Peter Graves a Best Supporting Actress award for Hill Street Blues actress Betty Thomas. Bremen was arrested and fined $175 for his stunt. He later apologized to Thomas, telling her that he had really thought that she was not there to accept her award.

== Personal life and death ==
Bremen died of esophageal cancer on his 64th birthday in 2011. He was buried at Mount Sinai Cemetery in Scottsdale, Arizona. A 2022 ESPN E:60 documentary revealed that Bremen had for many years been a sperm donor. As of 2022, more than 36 people are known to be Bremen’s biological children. The secret was discovered through an online DNA matching website. Through the documentary, the known children of Bremen were brought together for their first in-person meeting. He and his wife Margo also raised three children of their own.

== See also ==
- 1956 Olympic flame hoax
- Dolly Gray impostor
