= Tile Kolup =

Holy Roman Emperor imposter (died 1285)

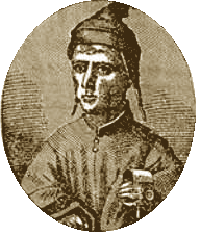
Tile Kolup

Tile Kolup (died 7 July 1285), also known as Dietrich Holzschuh, was an impostor who in 1284 began to pretend to be Frederick II, Holy Roman Emperor.

Kolup took advantage of persistent rumors that the emperor, who had died in 1250, was not really dead and was about to return to put in order the matters of the empire. When Kolup first claimed to be the emperor in 1284 in Cologne, he was laughed at, dunked in the sewer, and driven out of the city. He then found strong support in Neuss, and issued his own documents with a fake seal. He joined the enemies of King Rudolph of Habsburg who besieged the city unsuccessfully. In the summer of 1285 Tile Kolup went to Wetzlar where he held court; the origin of the necessary money remains unclear. He even issued privileges under royal seal and was visited by Italian supporters. Rudolph of Habsburg finally captured him in the same year in Wetzlar, where he had him burned at the stake as a heretic.
