= Zollikon =

- Municipality
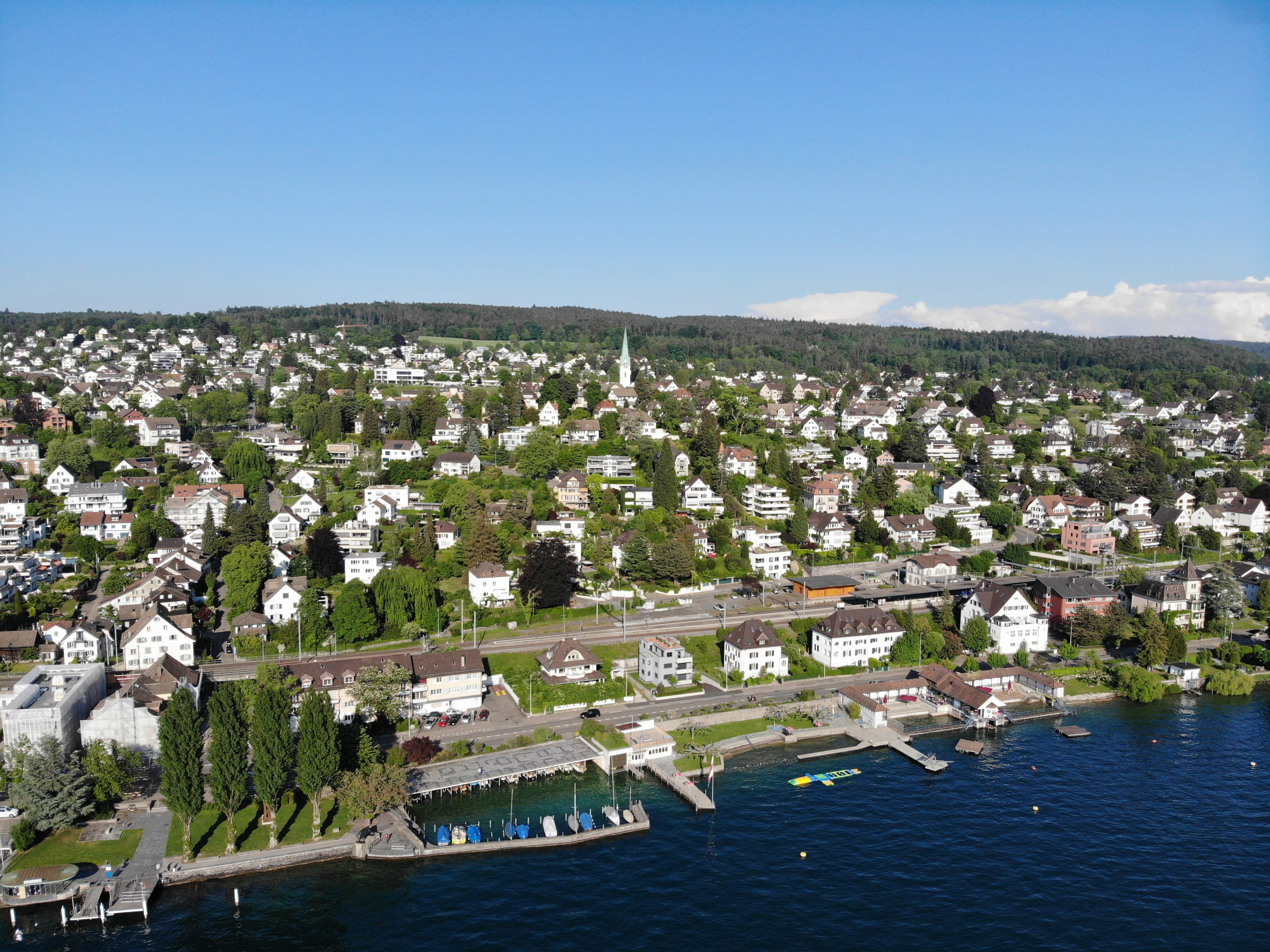

- Flag Coat of arms
- Location of Zollikon
- Location within Switzerland Location within Canton of Zürich
- Coordinates: 47°20′N 8°35′E
- Country: Switzerland
- Canton: Zürich
- District: Meilen

Area
  - Total: 7.84 km^{2} (3.03 sq mi)
- Elevation: 473 m (1,552 ft)

Population (December 2020)
  - Total: 13,311
  - Density: 1,700/km^{2} (4,400/sq mi)
- Time zone: UTC+01:00 (CET)
  - Summer (DST): UTC+02:00 (CEST)
- Postal code: 8702
- SFOS number: 161
- ISO 3166 code: CH-ZH
- Localities: Zollikerberg
- Surrounded by: Kilchberg, Küsnacht, Maur, Zumikon, Zürich
- Website: www.zollikon.ch

Zollikon is a municipality in Meilen District in the canton of Zürich, Switzerland known for being one of Switzerland's most exclusive districts. Besides the main settlement of Zollikon, which lies on the shore of Lake Zurich, the municipality also includes Zollikerberg, at a higher elevation on the road from Zürich to Forch.

== Geography ==
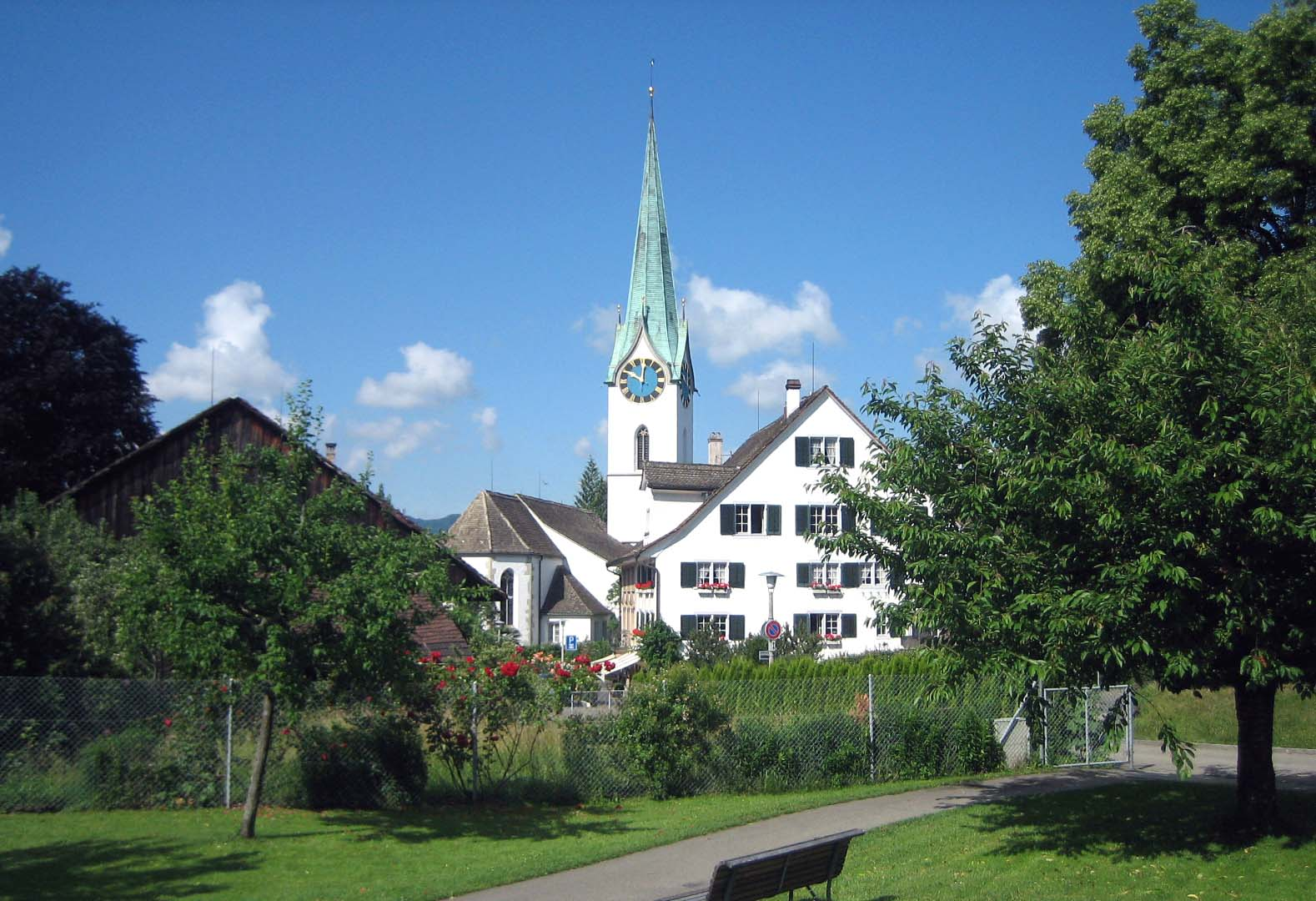
Swiss Reformed church in Zollikon

Aerial view (1967)

Zollikon has an area of 7.9 km^{2} (3.1 sq mi). Of this area, 21.2% is used for agricultural purposes, while 37.7% is forested. Of the rest of the land, 40.8% is settled (buildings or roads) and the remainder (0.3%) is non-productive (rivers, glaciers or mountains). In 1996 housing and buildings made up 33.3% of the total area, while transportation infrastructure made up the rest (7.5%). Of the total unproductive area, water (streams and lakes) made up 0.1% of the area. As of 2007 36.5% of the total municipal area was undergoing some type of construction.

Zollikon is located in the Pfannenstiel region.

Zollikon is on the so-called Gold Coast of Zürich, and considered one of the most desirable and expensive municipalities in the nation.

== Demographics ==
Zollikon has a population (as of 31 December 2020) of 13,311. As of 2007, 17.9% of the population was made up of foreign nationals. As of 2008 the gender distribution of the population was 47.3% male and 52.7% female. Over the last 10 years the population has grown at a rate of 5.9%. Most of the population (as of 2000) speaks German (85.9%), with English being second most common (3.0%) and Italian being third (2.4%).

In the 2007 election, the most popular political party in Zollikon was the FDP, which received 30.8% of the vote. The next three most popular parties were the SVP (29.4%), the SPS (14.1%) and the CSP (10.1%).

The age distribution of the population (as of 2000) is children and teenagers (0–19 years old) make up 16.6% of the population, while adults (20–64 years old) make up 59.1% and seniors (over 64 years old) make up 24.3%. In Zollikon about 85.3% of the population (between age 25–64) have completed either non-mandatory upper secondary education or additional higher education (either university or a Fachhochschule). There are 5675 households in Zollikon.

Zollikon has an unemployment rate of 1.34%. As of 2005, there were 44 people employed in the primary economic sector and about 14 businesses involved in this sector. 418 people are employed in the secondary sector and there are 61 businesses in this sector. 3969 people are employed in the tertiary sector, with 642 businesses in this sector. As of 2007 66.7% of the working population were employed full-time, and 33.3% were employed part-time.

As of 2008 there were 3,171 Catholics and 4759 Protestants in Zollikon. In the 2000 census, religion was broken down into several smaller categories. From the census, 46.9% were some type of Protestant, with 45.4% belonging to the Swiss Reformed Church and 1.6% belonging to other Protestant churches. 27.1% of the population were Catholic. Of the rest of the population, 1.8% were Muslim, 5.2% belonged to another religion (not listed), 3.5% did not give a religion, and 16.5% were atheist or agnostic.

== Transport ==
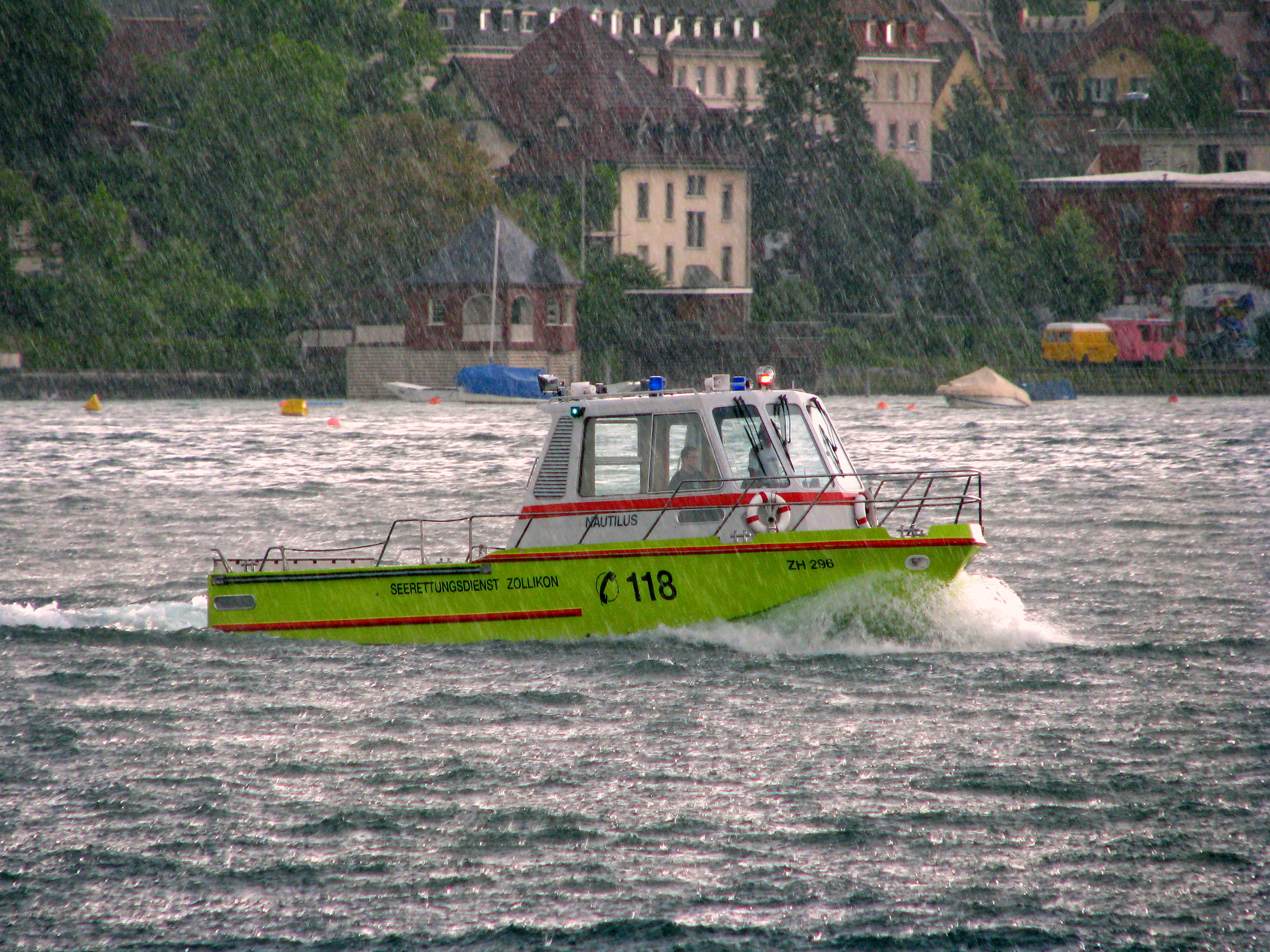
Zollikon SAR boat (Seerettungsdienst) on Lake Zurich (June 2009)

There are five railway stations within the municipality of Zollikon. Zollikon station is on the Lake Zürich right-bank line, and is served by S-Bahn Zürich services S6 and S16. Rehalp, Waldburg, Spital Zollikerberg and Zollikerberg stations are on the inland Forchbahn line, and are served by service S18.

Bus lines 910, 912 and 916 run through Zollikon. In the summer there are regular boats to Zürich as well as along the lake to Rapperswil, run by the Zürichsee-Schifffahrtsgesellschaft (ZSG).

== People from Zollikon ==
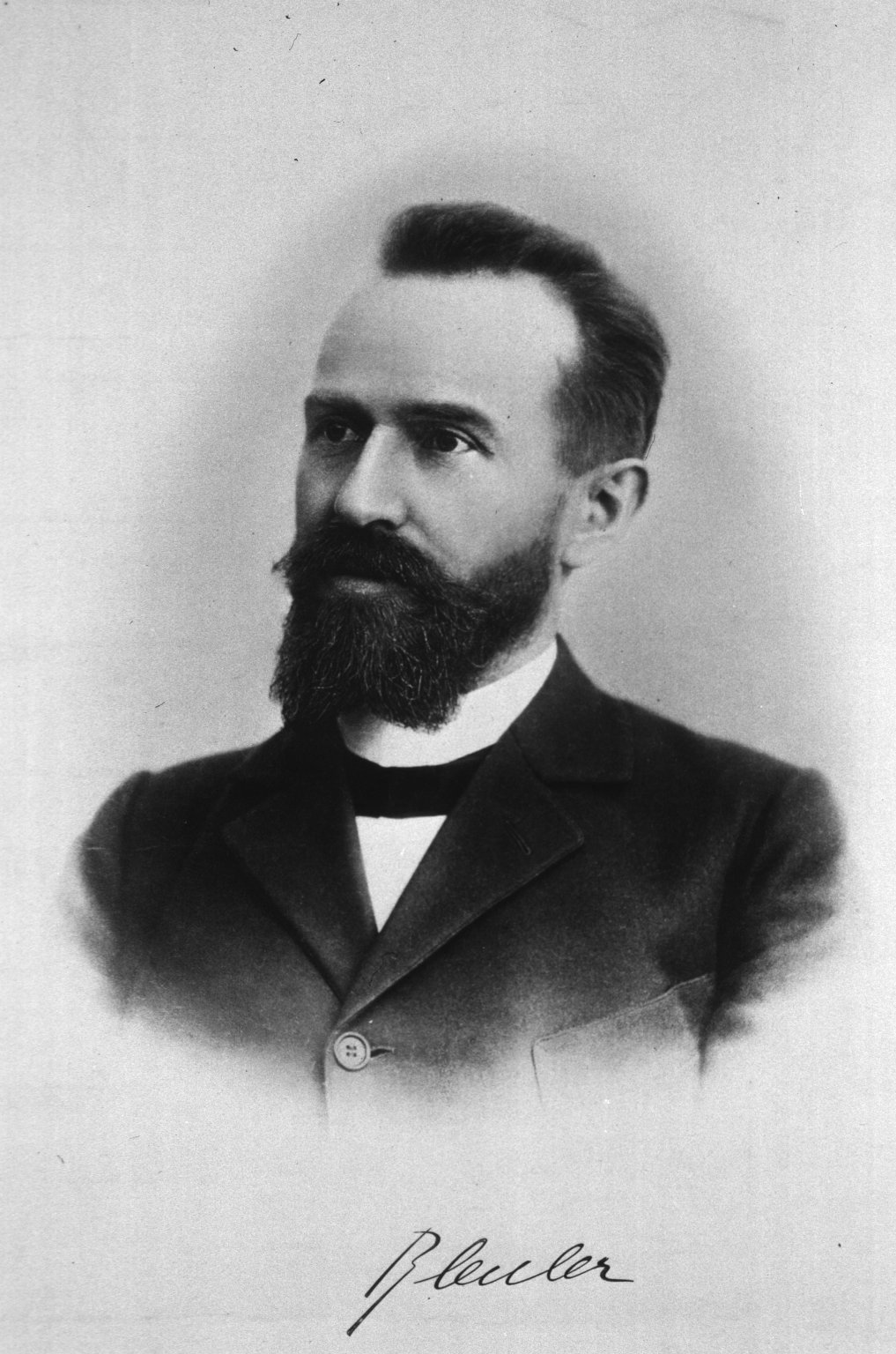
Eugen Bleuler, c. 1900

- Klaus Hottinger a shoemaker born in Zollikon, in 1522 he took part in the famous Affair of the Sausages
- Johann Heinrich Bleuler (1758 in Zollikon - 1823) a Swiss artist who worked with porcelain, landscape sketches and gouache.
- Eugen Bleuler (1857–1939) a Swiss psychiatrist and eugenicist, born and died in Zollikon
- Ivan Ilyin (1883 – 1954 in Zollikon) a Russian religious and political philosopher
- Leander Tomarkin (1895 in Zollikon – 1967) a Swiss impostor who claimed to possess a doctorate in medicine
- Egon von Vietinghoff (1903–1994) a German-Swiss painter, author and philosopher, lived in Zollikon from 1937
- Bruno Giacometti (1907–2012) a Swiss architect, lived in Zollikon from 1935
- Heinz Isler (1926 in Zollikon – 2009) a Swiss structural engineer, famous for his thin concrete shells.
- Adolf Muschg (born 1934 in Zollikon) a Swiss writer and professor of literature, member of the Gruppe Olten
- Margarita Louis-Dreyfus (born 1962) a Russian-born Swiss billionaire businesswoman, chairperson of Louis Dreyfus Company, lives in Zollikon.
- Cédric Brunner (born 1994 in Zollikon) a Swiss professional footballer

== Enzenbühl cemetery ==
Friedhof Enzenbühl, a cemetery whose area is shared with the Weinegg, became the resting place of some popular people, among them Inigo Gallo, César Keiser and Margrit Rainer.

== Gallery ==
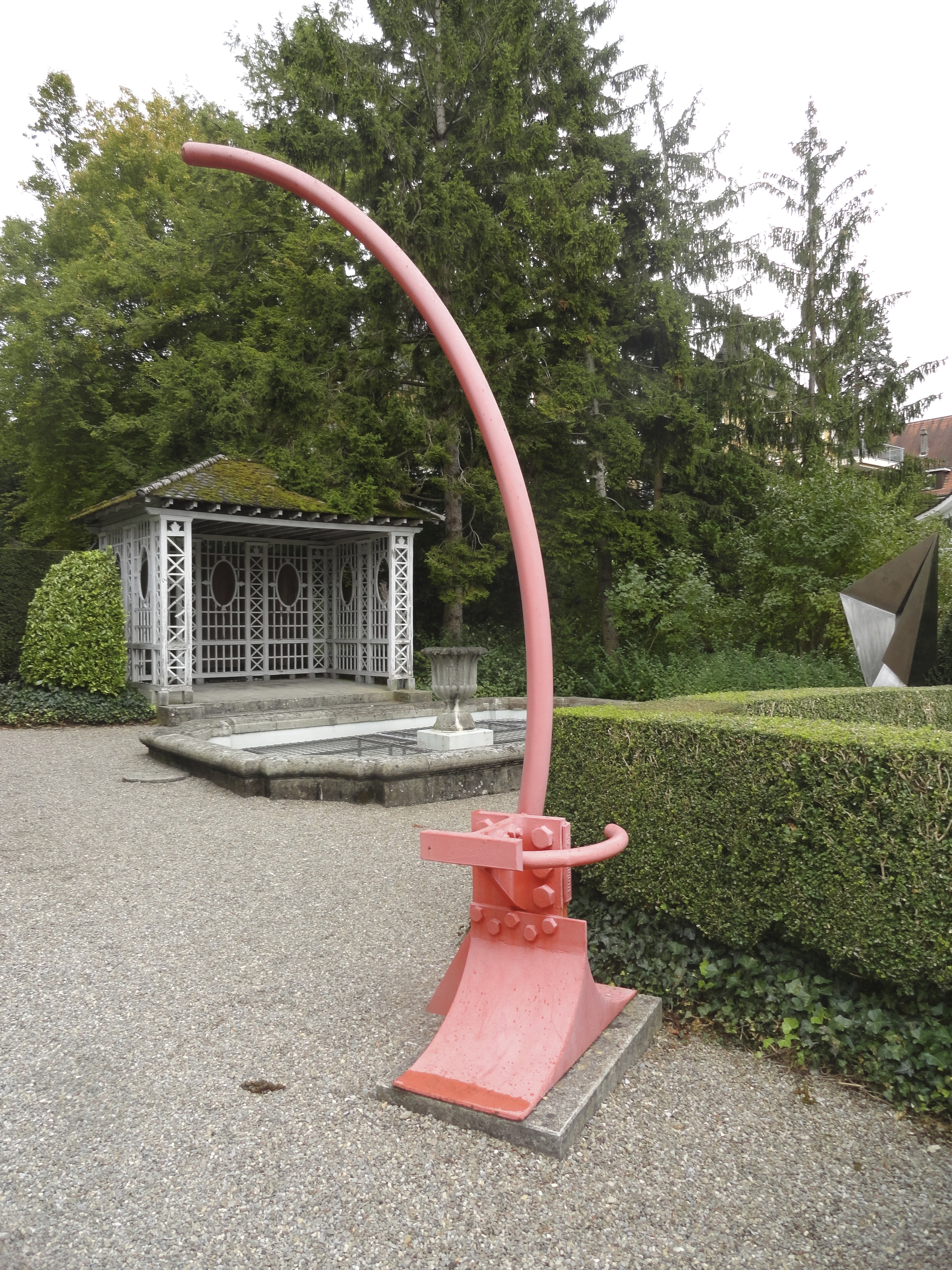
Bernhard Luginbühl: Danielstengel; Sammlung
Dr. Koenig

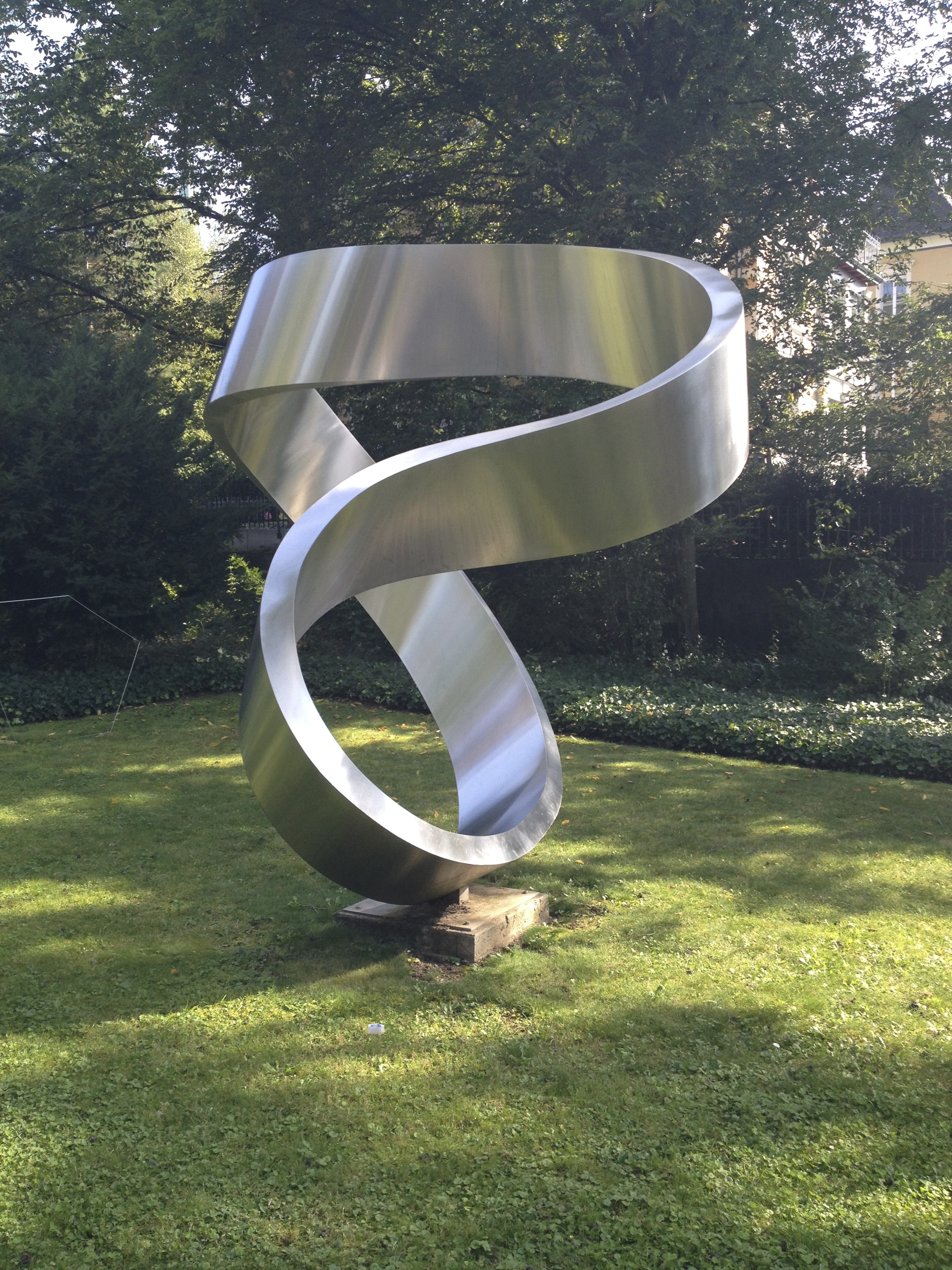
Josef Staub: King

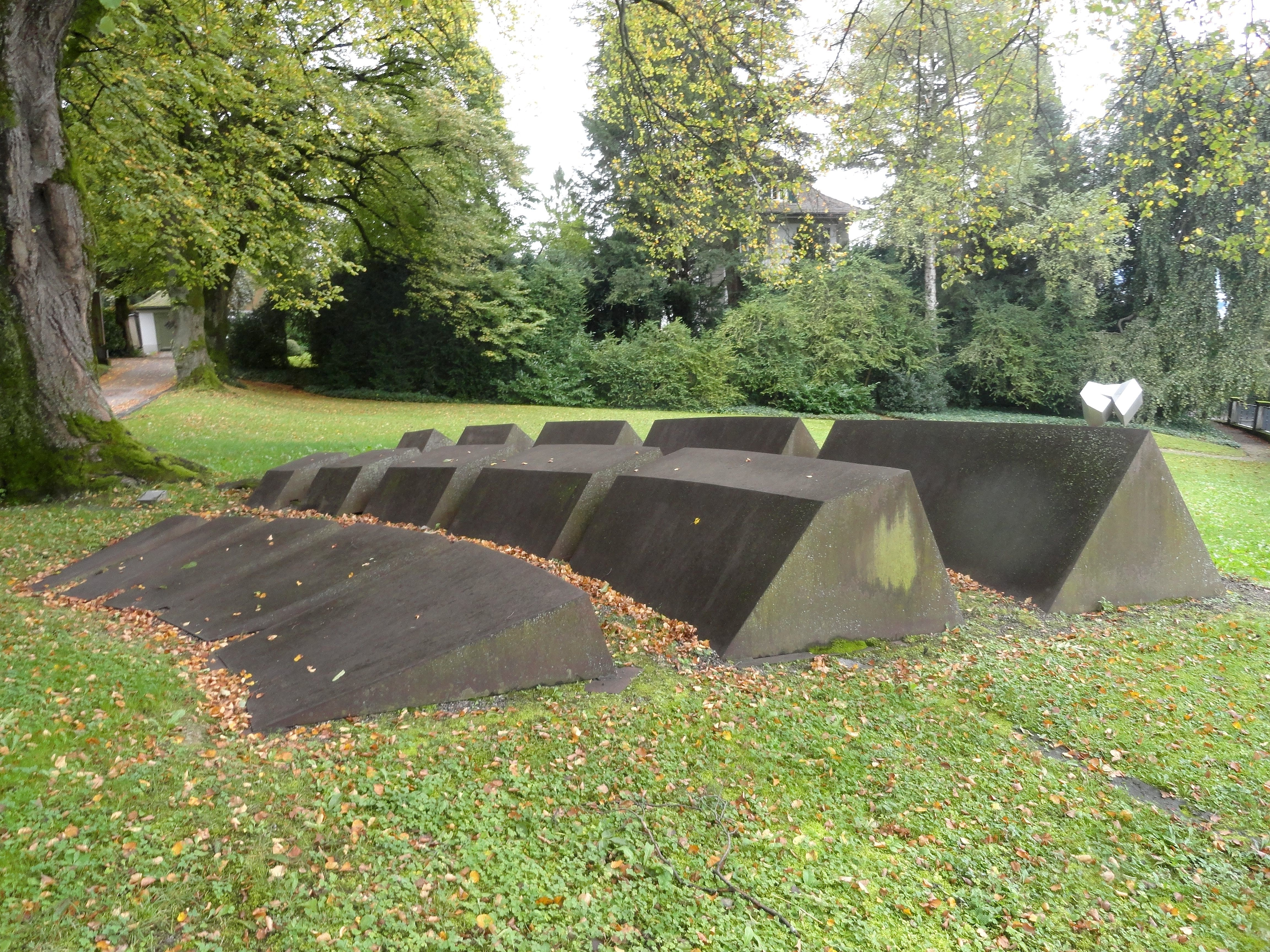
Gillian White: Fächersphäre

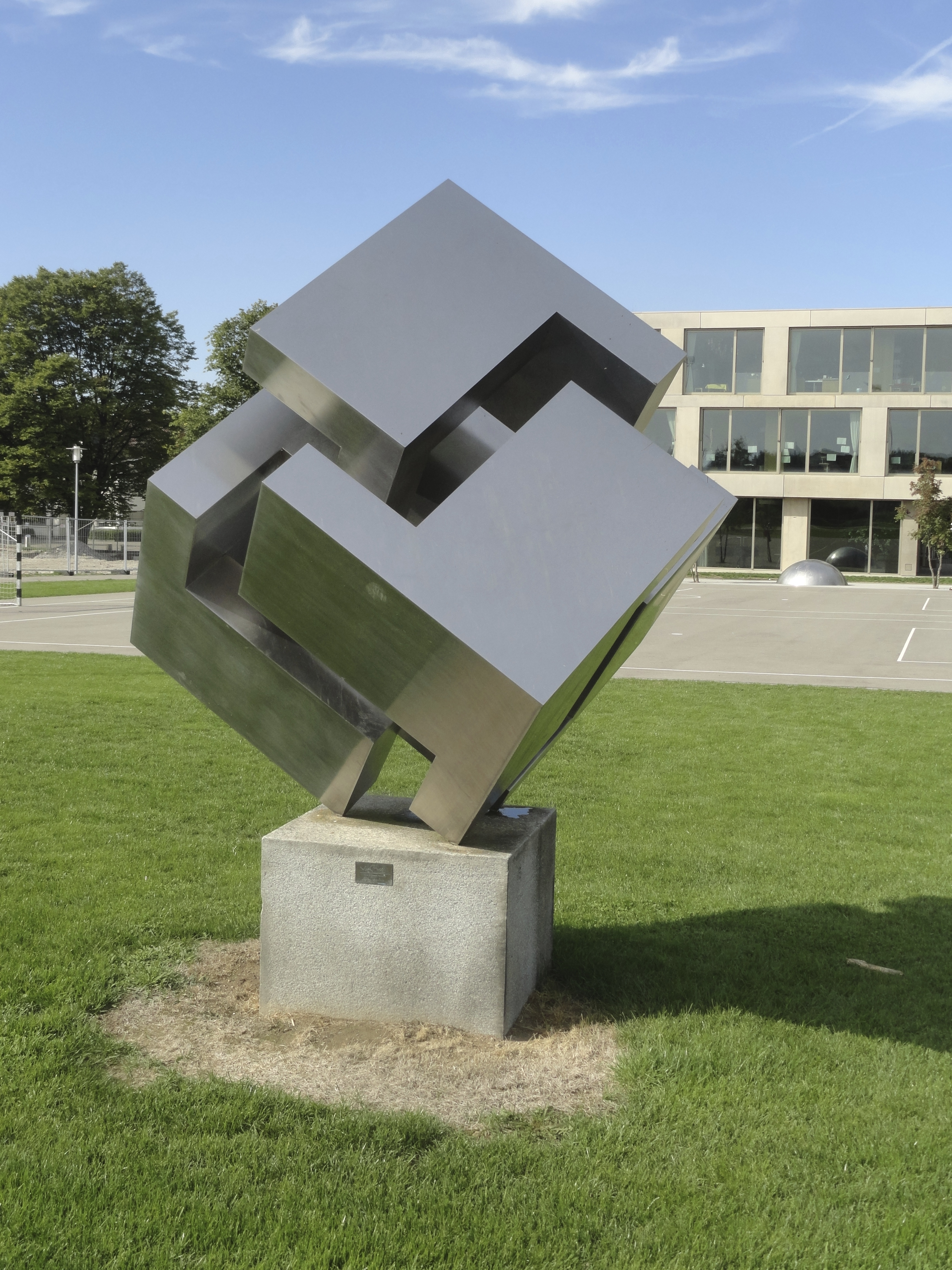
Carlo Vivarelli: Four concave and Four convex corners, Park Schulanlage Oescher

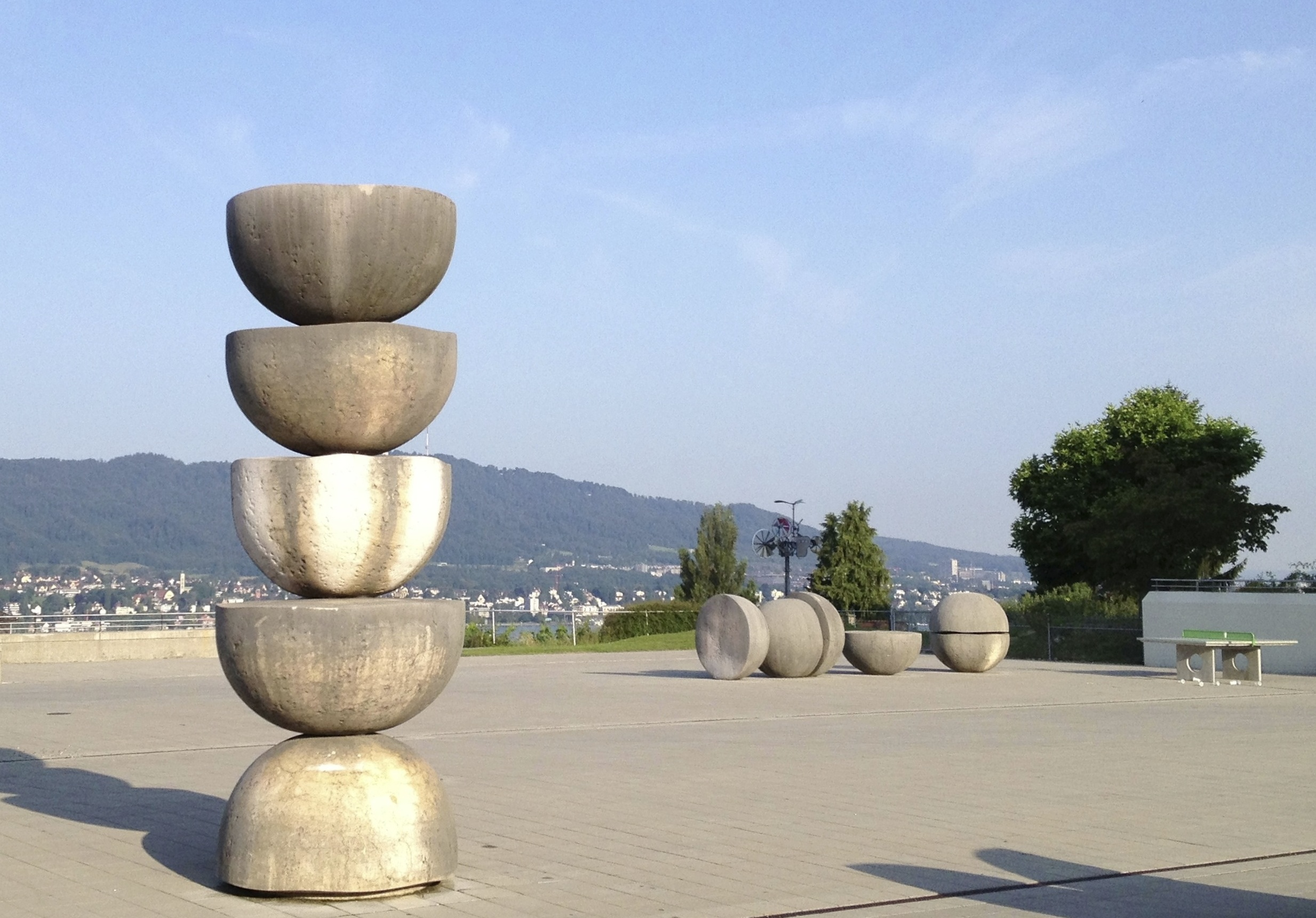
Paul Agustoni: Building and Participate, Buchholzhügel

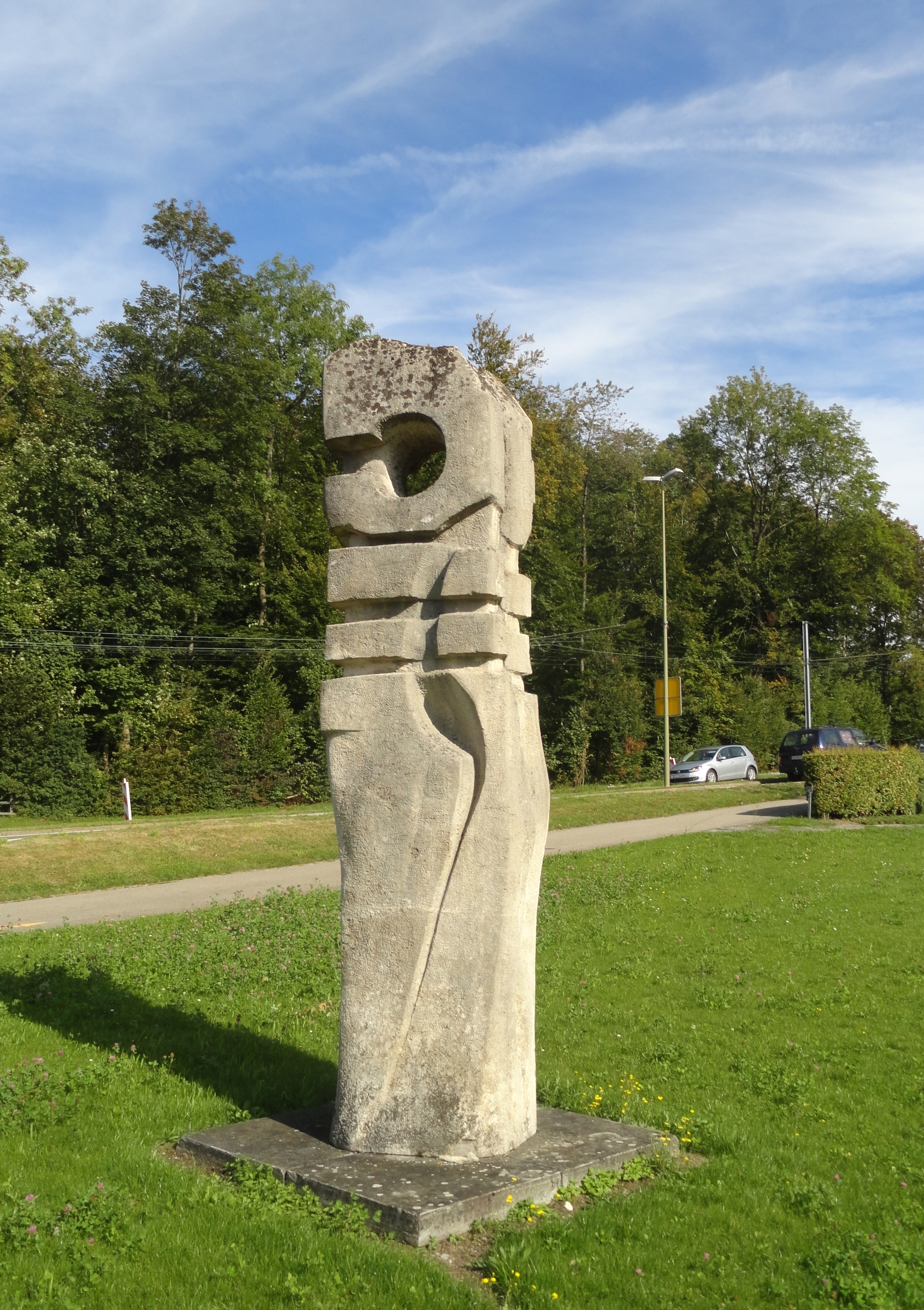
Yasuo Mizui: Clef au Ciel (Key to Heaven); Bergstrasse/Forchstrasse

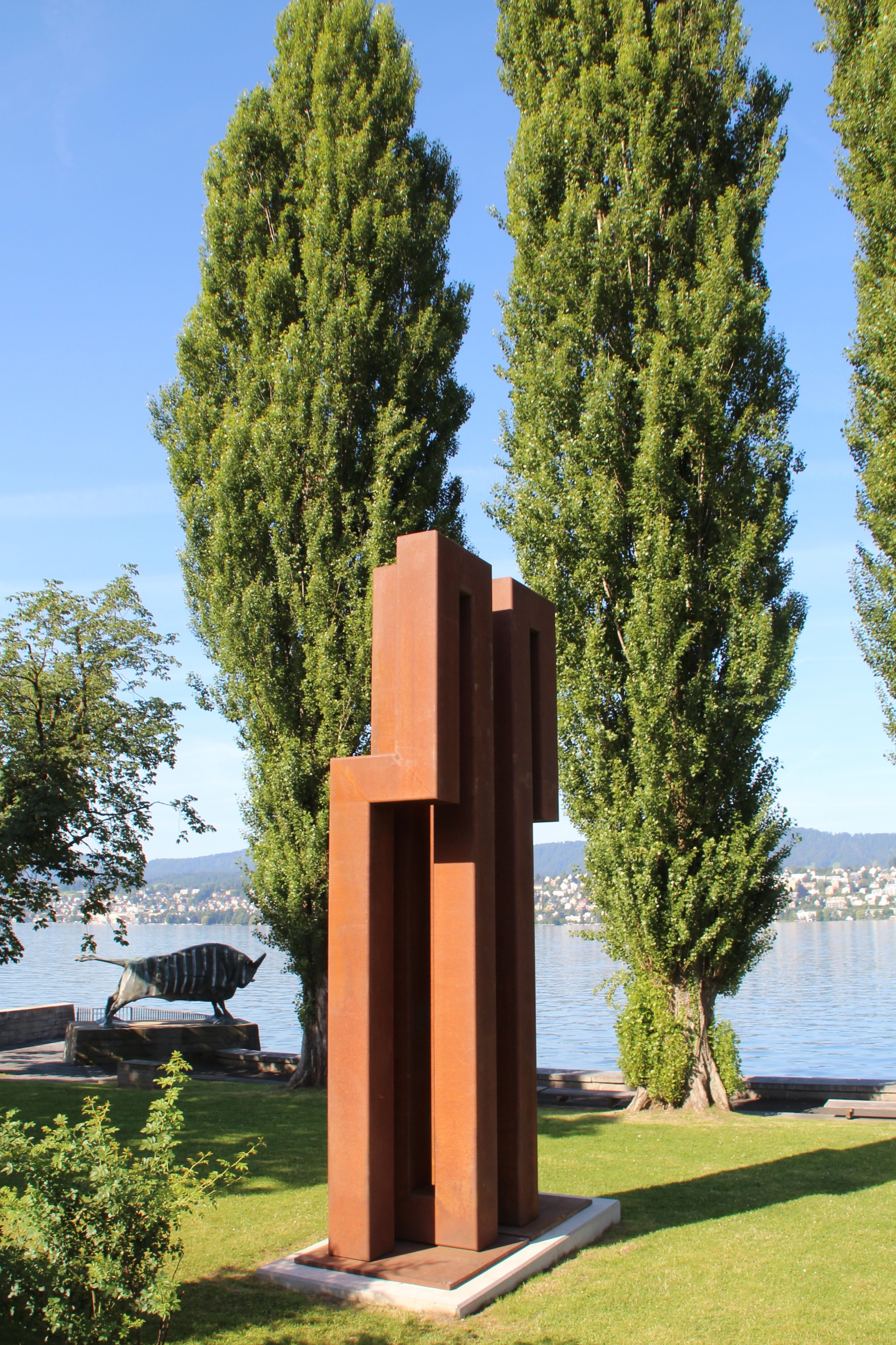
Stahlbau 400 von James Licini
