= Klaus Hottinger =

Swiss Protestant martyr

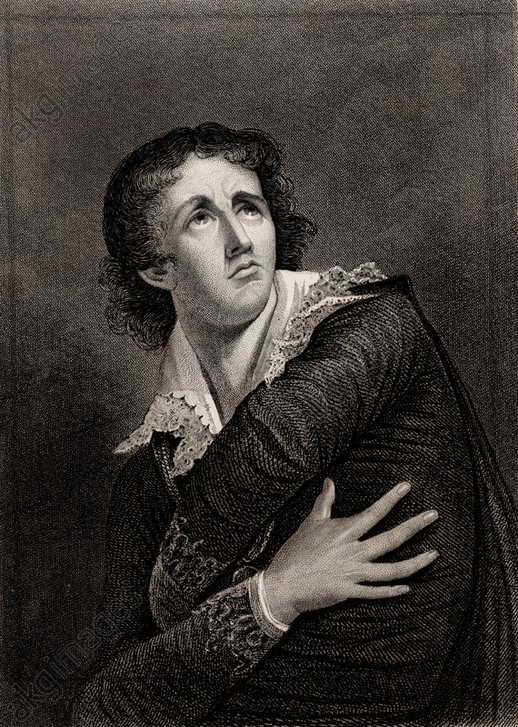

Klaus Hottinger (died 9 March 1524) was a Swiss shoemaker born in Zollikon. A disciple of Zwingli, he took part in the famous "Affair of the Sausages" of 1522 which marked the public beginning of the Reformation in Switzerland. In 1523, he overthrew a wooden crucifix at Stadelhofen on the outskirts of Zurich. He was as a consequence banished from the canton in November 1523. He was executed in Lucerne on 9 March 1524, despite Zurich's effort to intervene on his behalf, and thus became the first martyr of the Swiss Protestant movement.
