= Affair of the Sausages =

Event that sparked the Reformation in Zürich

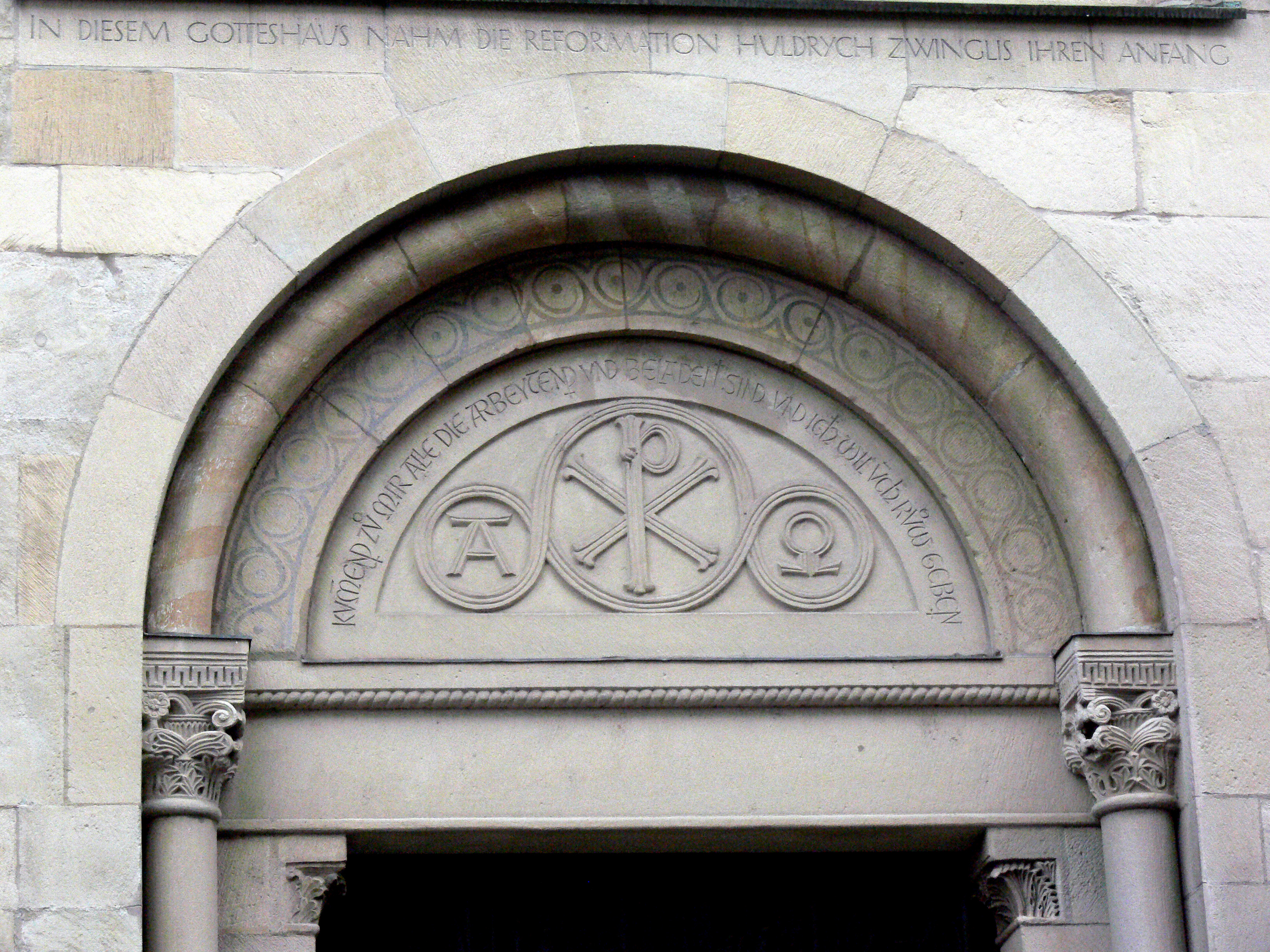
Relief above the Grossmünster in Zurich, reading: "In this House of God, Huldrych Zwingli's Reformation took its start."

The Affair of the Sausages (1522) was the event that sparked the Reformation in Zürich. Huldrych Zwingli, pastor of Grossmünster in Zurich, Switzerland, spearheaded the event by publicly speaking in favor of eating sausage during the Lenten fast. Zwingli defended this action in a sermon called Von Erkiesen und Freiheit der Speisen (Regarding the Choice and Freedom of Foods), in which he argued, from the basis of Martin Luther's doctrine of sola scriptura, that "Christians are free to fast or not to fast because the Bible does not prohibit the eating of meat during Lent."

== History ==
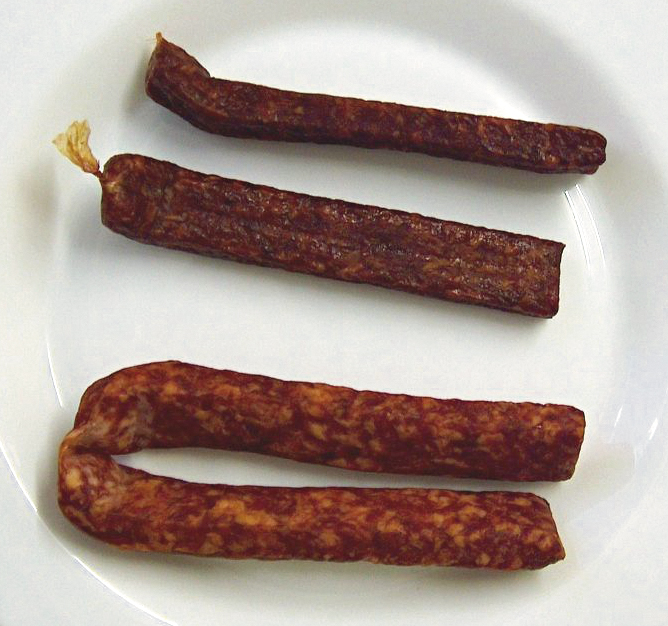
Smoked sausages

Ulrich Zwingli was a minister in Zurich, delivering sermons that aligned him with Desiderius Erasmus and Martin Luther. His first rift with the established religious authorities in Switzerland occurred during the Lenten fast of 1522, when he was present during the eating of sausages at the house of Christoph Froschauer, a printer in the city who later published Zwingli's translation of the Bible.

According to William Roscoe Estep, Zwingli already held Reformation-oriented convictions for some time before the incident. In March 1522, he was invited to partake in a sausage supper that Froschauer served to his workers—who, Froschauer later claimed, were exhausted from putting out the new edition of The Epistles of Saint Paul—and to various dignitaries and priests. Leo Jud, Klaus Hottinger and Lorenz Hochrütiner were present at the supper and later gained notoriety for their part in the Swiss Reformation. The meal involved Swiss Fasnachtskiechli and some slices of sharp smoked hard sausage, which had been stored for more than a year. Because the eating of meat during Lent was prohibited, the event caused public outcry and led to Froschauer being arrested. Even though Zwingli was at this supper, he was not arrested.

Though he himself did not eat the sausages, Zwingli was quick to defend Froschauer from allegations of heresy. In a sermon titled Von Erkiesen und Freiheit der Speisen (Regarding the Choice and Freedom of Foods), Zwingli argued that fasting should be entirely voluntary, not mandatory. According to Michael Reeves, Zwingli was advancing the Reformation position that Lent was subject to individual rule, rather than the discipline which was upheld at the time by the Catholic Church. The Zurich sausage affair was interpreted as a demonstration of Christian liberty and is considered to be of similar importance for Switzerland as Martin Luther's 95 theses in Wittenberg for the German Reformation.

== Socio-economic implication of fasting regulations ==
The strict fasting regulations imposed by the Catholic Church during Lent had notable socio-economic impacts, particularly on the lower classes. While the affluent could find ways to maintain indulgent diets even during fasting periods, the poor often faced nutritional deficiencies due to the restrictions. The Affair of the Sausages not only challenged pastoral authority but also underscored these socio-economic disparities. Huldrych Zwingli, who was present during the event, later defended the act by arguing that fasting should be a matter of personal choice, as the Bible does not mandate abstaining from certain foods during Lent.

== Impact ==
After hearing of the situation, Hugo von Hohenlandenberg, the Bishop of Konstanz, was so scandalized by Zwingli's preaching that he called for a mandate prohibiting the preaching of any Reformation doctrine in Switzerland. However, the damage had already been done, and Zwingli went on to become an extremely popular and revered figure in Swiss Protestantism, having contracted and recovered from the Black Death and drawn up sixty-seven theses (similar to Martin Luther's Ninety-five Theses) that denounced several long-standing beliefs of the Church of Rome.

== In culture ==
The Affair is the subject of a 2015 cantata Geist und Wurst by Edward Rushton.

== See also ==
- Reformation in Zürich
- Theology of Huldrych Zwingli
- Klaus Hottinger
