= Ulrich Schnaft =

German Waffen-SS member turned Israeli military officer (1923–2013)

- Ulrich Schnaft
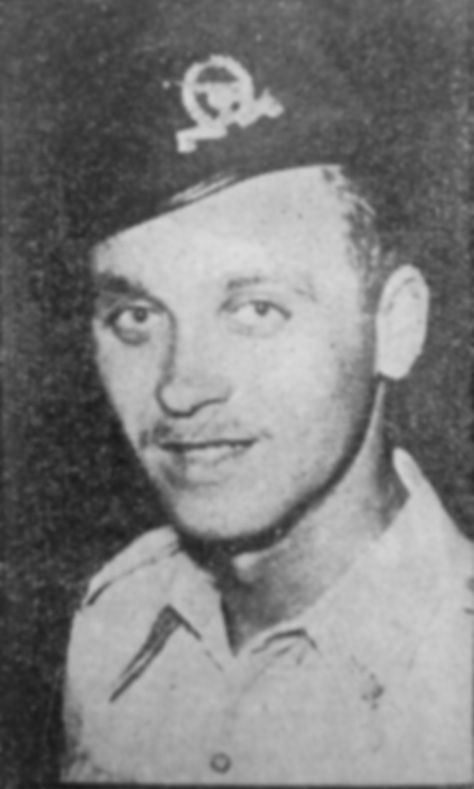
- Ulrich Schnaft in his IDF uniform
- Born: 3 October 1923; Königsberg, East Prussia, Prussia, Germany
- Died: 1 November 2013 (aged 90)
- Military career
- Allegiance: Nazi Germany; Israel; Egypt
- Branch: (Nazi Germany) Waffen-SS; Israel Defense Forces
- Service years: 1941–1944, 1949–1952
- Rank: Captain
- Nickname: Gavriel Weissman

Ulrich Schnaft (3 October 1923 – 1 November 2013) was a German military officer. During World War II he served in the Waffen-SS rising to the rank of captain. After the war, he immigrated to Israel in 1949 by posing as a Jew, where he later served in the Israeli Army. Afterwards he was later convicted of spying for Egypt.

== Early life and World War II service ==
Ulrich Schnaft was born in Königsberg, East Prussia, Prussia, Germany, in 1923, the son of a single mother. His mother placed him in an orphanage, and he was later adopted by a German family. He attended a vocational school and was trained as a mechanical technician, graduating in 1941, during World War II. He then enlisted in the German Army and joined the Waffen-SS. He was deployed to the Eastern front. He was wounded and taken to a hospital in Germany. After recuperating, he was sent to Yugoslavia and posted to a unit engaged in anti-partisan warfare there. He was subsequently deployed to northern Italy in 1944. He was taken prisoner by the US Army near the Po River. He remained in a POW camp until mid-1947. His captors released him after finding no evidence he had committed war crimes.

== Emigration to Israel ==
After his release, Schnaft moved to Munich, where he lived in a rented room. His roommate was a young Jew who told him about the charity being provided for Holocaust survivors, particularly the American Jewish Joint Distribution Committee's food packages and financial assistance. Schnaft was struggling to find food or a job due to Germany's dire post-war economic situation. He therefore decided to pose as a Holocaust survivor, applying for and receiving aid from the AJJDC.

Schnaft saw no future in Germany due to the harsh living conditions there and became determined to emigrate and build a life somewhere else. He heard of groups of Jews who were trying to enter British-ruled Mandatory Palestine as part of Aliyah Bet. In October 1947, posing as a Jewish refugee named Gavriel Weissman, he joined a group of displaced Jews intending on trying to enter Palestine. The group traveled to Marseille, France, by train, and lived in a camp on the outskirts of the city run by Mossad LeAliyah Bet for two months. In December 1947, he boarded an Aliyah Bet ship bound for Palestine. The ship was intercepted by the Royal Navy, and Schnaft, along with the other passengers, was transferred to a Cyprus internment camp. While detained on Cyprus, Schnaft joined a Haganah cell in the camp. He was involved in two Haganah-organized escape attempts.

Following the Israeli Declaration of Independence and the beginning of the 1948 Arab-Israeli War, the British released most Cyprus inmates but continued to detain men of military age. In 1949, as the war drew to an end, Schnaft and the other remaining inmates were deported to Israel and arrived in Haifa. Schnaft was placed in kibbutz Kiryat Anavim, where he studied Hebrew.

== Israeli military career ==
In August 1949, Schnaft was drafted into the Israel Defense Forces (IDF) and completed a squad commanders' course. After the end of his regular service, his commanders, who had been impressed with the military knowledge and skills he had demonstrated during his service, invited him to return to the army as a career officer. He accepted, passed an officers' course, and became a reserve officer in the IDF Artillery Corps, eventually reaching the rank of captain. However, Schnaft's career came to an end in 1952 after he requested a permanent officer's commission, resulting in a thorough background check. Israeli intelligence had begun to suspect his background. It was found that he had no verifiable history from before 1947 and no known living relatives. Furthermore, he spoke Hebrew with a distinct German accent. It also emerged that during a night of heavy drinking, Schnaft had shown his comrades a picture of himself in an SS uniform. When questioned about this, Schnaft claimed that it had been a Purim costume. It was noted that he was a "loner" seen in the company of "sketchy individuals". He was also suspected of stealing ammunition from a military base, and ammunition was found during a search of his room. He was denied a commission and discharged from the IDF.

== Espionage ==
Following his discharge, Schnaft moved to Ashkelon, where he rented an apartment and worked a series of odd jobs, hoping to eventually save up enough money to emigrate to another country and establish a new life. During this period, he began having an affair with the wife of his landlord, a German immigrant to Israel, a woman who was about 20 years his senior. After her husband discovered the affair, he evicted him, and his wife left him to remain with Schnaft. The couple then moved to Haifa and lived together in a small apartment.

At the same time, West Germany was experiencing reconstruction and rapid economic growth in a period known as the "economic miracle". Hearing of this, the couple eventually decided to return there. In 1954, they sailed on a passenger ferry to Genoa, Italy, and tried to enter West Germany from there. Schnaft, who had only $20 in his pocket, was denied entry due to his Israeli passport. At the time, Israeli passports were stamped with a "not valid for travel to Germany" notice, due to an Israeli boycott of that country. He then asked the German consul in Genoa for a visa and told him his story, but the consul refused to believe him and rejected his request. Afterwards, his girlfriend, who still had a German passport, entered Germany on her own. She returned to Israel to reunite with her husband, and they then moved to Germany together.

Having been denied entry to West Germany and with almost no money left, Schnaft decided to sell Israeli military secrets to Egypt, then a major enemy of Israel. He contacted the Egyptian consulate in Genoa, and offered to sell Israeli secrets in exchange for help in returning to Germany. The consul was impressed with his story, and then took him to Rome by train, where they met the military attaché at the Egyptian embassy. Following an interview, it was decided to fly him to Cairo for further questioning by intelligence experts.

Schnaft gave the Egyptians his Israeli passport, and received an Egyptian passport in the name of Robert Hayat. He was flown to Cairo, and lived there for a month. While there, he was interviewed by intelligence officers and gave them detailed descriptions of various IDF structures, such as army units, bases, armaments, training programs, and names of officers.

The Egyptians eventually asked him to return to Israel under an assumed identity, enlist in the IDF, and act as an agent for them, but he refused, telling them that all he wanted was to return to Germany. Eventually, they agreed, and arranged for him to fly to Rome on his Egyptian passport. He was given several hundred dollars as a reward for his services. From Rome, he took a train to Genoa, where he was given a laissez-passer by the Egyptian consulate, enabling him to enter Germany. He returned to Germany in March 1954.

== Capture ==
After his return to Germany, Schnaft moved to Frankfurt to live with his aunt, who was running a pharmacy. He tracked down his former lover in Israel, who was now living in Berlin with her husband, and went to her house hoping to win her back. He confessed to her his true origins and told her about his Nazi past, and also told her that he had been a spy for Egypt. The woman refused to leave her husband for him, and he then gave her his address in Frankfurt in case she changed her mind. The woman told her husband about his confession. The husband wrote to the Israeli security service Shin Bet and sent a photograph with the letter, which was received in October 1955. Senior commanders in the Israeli intelligence community reviewed the letter, and it was decided to bring Schnaft to Israel to put him on trial. They knew that Schnaft, as a junior officer in the IDF Artillery Corps, could have done only minimal damage, but they wanted to convey the image of an Israel capable of reaching anywhere, and to make an example of him.

It was initially proposed that an assassination squad be sent to kill Schnaft, but this was rejected. Instead, it was determined to bring him to trial. Shin Bet agents were then deployed to Frankfurt, where they found Schnaft. For the next few weeks, Shin Bet agents shadowed and clandestinely photographed Schnaft, and it was discovered that he had once again fallen into poverty. At this point, Mossad agents were deployed, and a plan was formulated to lure him back to Israel.

An agent, Shmuel Moriah, who was of Iraqi-Jewish origin, met Schnaft at a social gathering after a female Mossad operative posing as a journalist befriended Schnaft and introduced the two. Posing as an Iraqi citizen named Adnan Ben-Adnan, Moriah invited him to lunch in a Berlin restaurant the next day. Schnaft accepted. During their first meeting, Moriah deliberately dropped a forged Iraqi officer's identity card so Schnaft could pick it up and discern that he was an Iraqi officer. Over a series of meetings Schnaft told Moriah his story, including his SS service, Israeli military career, and meetings with Egyptian intelligence. Moriah then proposed he work as an Iraqi spy in Israel, promising generous pay in exchange for investigating reports of oil fields near Ashkelon. Schnaft agreed and returned to Israel in 1956 with a forged Israeli passport. He was arrested on arrival.

Schnaft was brought to the Shin Bet's interrogation facility in Jaffa, where he confessed everything. He was put on trial, convicted, and sentenced to seven years in prison. While in prison, he may have befriended Ze'ev Eckstein, the assassin of Rudolf Kastner. He was a polite and cooperative inmate and spent his time in prison reading the Bible, believing that he would be able to collect his pay from "Captain Adnan" upon his release. In 1961, after serving five years, he was paroled for good behavior and deported to West Germany on the condition that he never return to Israel.

== Later life ==
According to unverified information in a book released by his cellmate Eckstein, Schnaft was later ordained as a Lutheran pastor in Germany, and became a supporter of Israel. According to Shmuel Moriah, Schnaft married a Jewish wife, had a daughter, and became active in fundraising for Israel, visiting the country on two separate occasions despite being told never to return. He died on the 1st of November 2013, aged 90.
