= Brian Kim (hedge fund manager) =

American hedge fund manager

- Born: 1975 or 1976 (age 50–51); New Jersey, U.S.
- Other name: Bu Yung Kim
- Occupation: former hedge fund manager
- Known for: Ponzi scheme
- Status: Incarcerated
- Criminal charges: Pleaded guilty to charges including passport fraud, grand larceny, scheme to defraud, violation of the NY General Business Law (Martin Act), and falsifying business records
- Penalty: 5 years, 7 months, to 15 years, 7 months in prison
- Capture status: Arrested
- Time at large: 10 months

Brian Kim (also known as "Bu Yung Kim"; born 1975/1976) is an American former hedge fund manager. He founded the now-defunct Liquid Capital Management LLC, which focused on futures trading.

In 2011, he was found guilty of fraudulent solicitation, misappropriation, and misrepresentation to investors and regulatory organizations. An injunction was sought, preventing him from trading in commodities futures and foreign currencies. A $12.5 million default judgement was entered against him, and he was banned from commodity trading.

In 2012, he pleaded guilty to charges including passport fraud, grand larceny, scheme to defraud, violation of the NY General Business Law (Martin Act), and falsifying business records to further a Ponzi scheme. He was sentenced to a term of five years, seven months and 15 years, seven months in prison.

== Early life and education ==
Kim was born in the late-to-mid 1970s in New Jersey. He graduated from Dartmouth College in 1997, where he had majored in economics and minored in art history.

== Career ==
He founded the now-defunct Liquid Capital Management LLC, which focused on futures trading, in 2002 and had an office on Broadway in New York City.

In 2009, Kim twice appeared on CNBC's financial television news show Squawk Box, speaking as an expert about derivatives trading.

== Controversy ==
Brian Kim owned and lived in an apartment at Christodora House. He was indicted and arrested in 2009, and accused of stealing $435,000 from the Christodora House condo association in 2008.

Kim failed to appear at his trial in January 2011, and was charged with jumping bail. He had fled to Hong Kong after obtaining a new passport by saying his was lost. In fact it had been confiscated by authorities. He was taken into custody in Hong Kong in October 2011, and was returned to the United States.

After an investigation by the Commodity Futures Trading Commission (CFTC) into his hedge fund business, in February 2011, Kim was charged both civilly and criminally with financial fraud, grand larceny, and scheme to defraud for running a $6 million Ponzi scheme from January 2003 through January 2011, and cheating at least 45 investors from the West Coast while providing them with fake monthly performance statements. According to prosecutors, he misrepresented the quality of the investments to his clients, while stealing some of the money for himself.

The CFTC sued Kim and Liquid Capital in February 2011, charging them with fraudulent solicitation, misappropriation, and misrepresentation to investors and regulatory organizations, and seeking an injunction preventing them from trading in commodities futures and foreign currencies. The agency said Kim and his employees told clients that Liquid Capital generated returns of more than 240 percent, when in fact they were losing money, and the only funds coming in were from new deposits by clients.

In April 2011, Judge Denise Cote of the U.S. District Court for the Southern District of New York found the defendants guilty of all charges. She entered a default judgment of $12.5 million against him, and he and Liquid Capital were banned from further commodity trading. In addition, the court froze his assets.

In March 2012, he pleaded guilty to passport fraud by attempting to acquire a new passport from by claiming his was lost. In reality, his passport was already confiscated by prosecutors.

On March 16, 2012, Kim pleaded guilty to nine of the 26 counts against him, including grand larceny, scheme to defraud, violation of the NY General Business Law (Martin Act), and falsifying business records in connection with the Ponzi scheme charge, and stealing $435,000 from the Christadora House.

In April 2012, Kim was sentenced by Justice Charles H. Solomon in New York State Supreme Court in Manhattan to five to 15 years in state prison, which was to commence after Kim had served seven months in federal prison on his passport fraud conviction.
