= Bub Weller =

American football player (1902–1993)

Personal information
- Born: August 7, 1902; Seward, Nebraska, U.S.
- Died: June 3, 1953 (aged 50)

Career information
- College: Nebraska

Career history
- 1923: St. Louis All-Stars
- 1924: Milwaukee Badgers
- 1925–1927: Chicago Cardinals
- 1928: Frankford Yellow Jackets

Awards and highlights
- All-American, 1922; First-team All-Pro (1923)

Raymond Fred "Bub" Weller (August 7, 1902 – June 3, 1953) was an American football player who played college football for the University of Nebraska and played five years and 60 games of professional football in the early years of the National Football League (NFL). Weller was unanimously selected for All-American honors at the tackle position in 1922. Weller was 6 feet 4 inches tall (1.93 m) and weighed 224 lb (102 kg) during his years as a professional football player.

As a football player in Nebraska, he is credited with having "a large hand in the stunning defeat" of Notre Dame in 1922. After his performance against Syracuse, eastern sports writers called Weller's performance the "greatest defense game we ever saw." And in a game against Kansas Aggie, he was credited with being "in on practically every play, breaking thru time after time and harassing if not blocking a passer." Weller was selected as a first-team All-American on the teams selected by both Walter Eckersall of the Chicago Tribune and Fred A. Hayner of the Chicago Daily News. He was also named to Billy Evans' 1922 National Honor Roll.

In 1937, the Nebraska Legislature created within the Nebraska Safety Patrol, and Weller was appointed as the chief officer of the new force. Weller had previously served as a highway engineer and later became the state's Chief Highway Engineer. Weller personally ran the training camp for the safety patrol recruits. In an October 1937 profile of Weller's training practices, Weller noted, "The rain and cold have held us back but the men are already pretty well toughened up. ... They have their morning run and calisthenics, jiu jitsu is plenty tough but the men can stand pretty tough workouts and another couple weeks will find them in the pink." In November 1937, 44 patrolmen under Weller's supervision were assigned to the field with the mission of reducing the number of motor-vehicle accidents on Nebraska's highways.

During World War II, Weller left the Safety Patrol to serve in the military.
