= Howdy Gray =

American football player and surgeon (1901–1955)

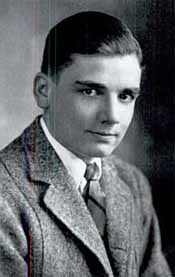
- Born: August 28, 1901
- Died: September 6, 1955 (aged 54)
- Occupation: surgeon
- Football career

Profile
- Position: End

Career information
- College: Princeton (1922)

Awards and highlights
- National champion (1922); All-American (1922)

Howard Kramer "Howdy" Gray (August 28, 1901 – September 6, 1955) was a college football player and surgeon.

== Princeton ==
Gray was a prominent end on the Princeton Tigers football team.

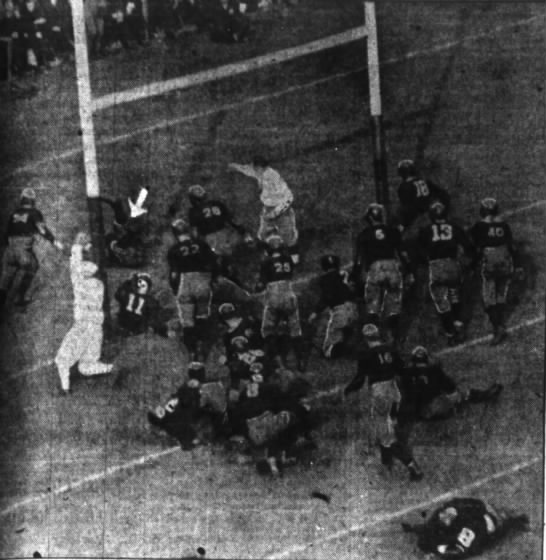
Gray's score in the Chicago game.

=== 1922 ===
On the national champion "Team of Destiny" in its game against Chicago, Howdy picked up a fumble and ran it 40 yards for the touchdown. Gray's father, the president of the Union Pacific Railroad, wildly waved his program and hit a woman in the shoulder. "Hey, that's my wife," a man shouted at him. "Sorry," the excited father said, "but that was my boy who scored." "Oh," the husband said. "Hit her again." Various selectors picked Gray for All-American.

An impostor claiming to be the 1922 All-American end from Princeton surnamed Gray managed to get signed to the St. Louis All-Stars of the National Football League. The impostor, who misquoted Gray's first name as Jack "Dolly" Gray, was then pawned off onto the Green Bay Packers after it became clear he was not the Princeton end.

== See also ==
- Dolly Gray impostor
