= Stanley Clifford Weyman =

American con man

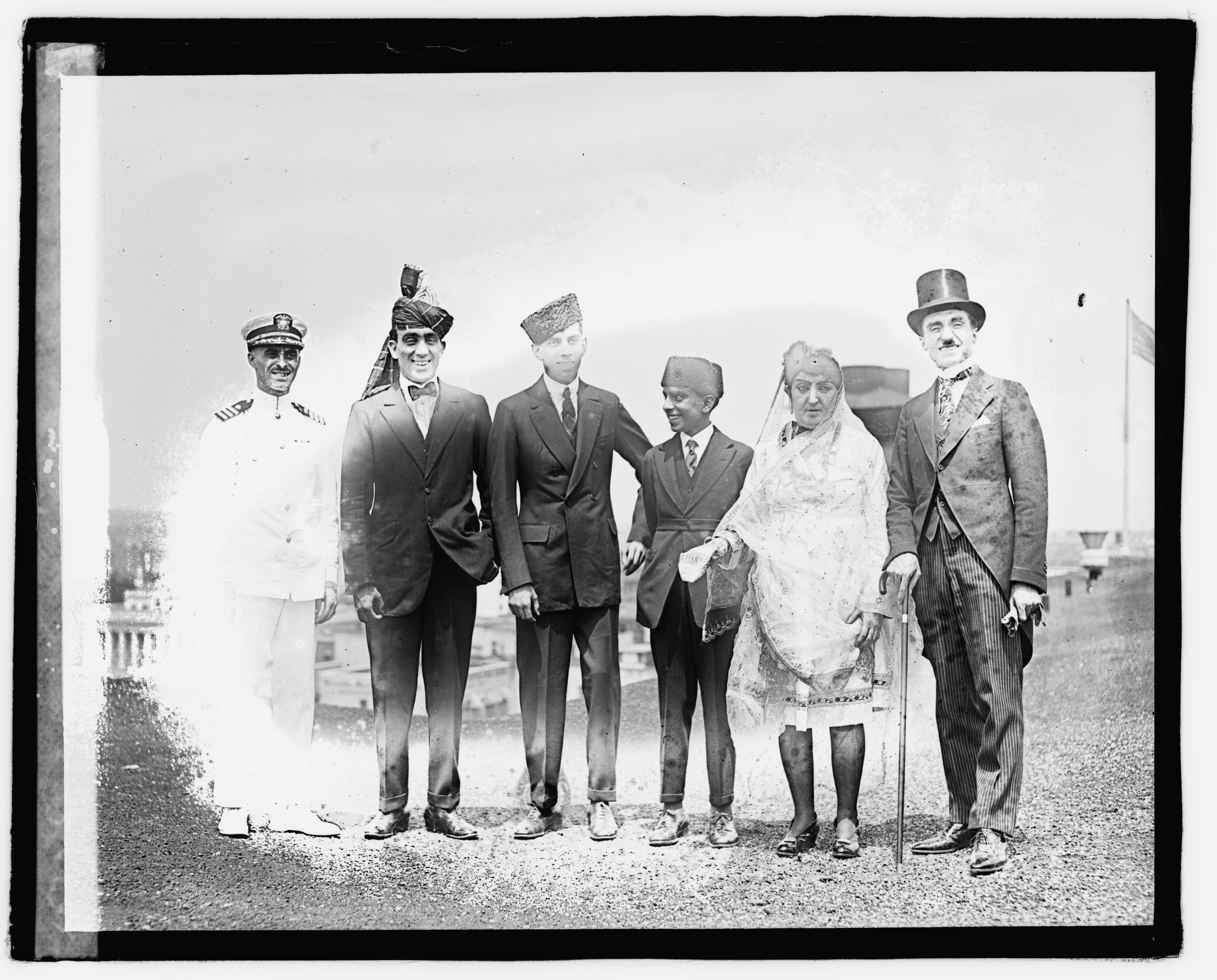
Stanley Clifford Weyman (left) with Princess Fatima and her entourage.

Stanley Clifford Weyman (November 25, 1890 – August 27, 1960), was an American multiple impostor who impersonated public officials, including the United States Secretary of State and various military officers.

Weyman was born as Stephen Jacob Weinberg on November 25, 1890, in Brooklyn, New York. His parents could not afford college tuition. He worked mainly in nondescript jobs but on occasion pretended to become somebody higher on the social ladder.

In 1910, Weyman's first imposture was as U.S. consul representative to Morocco. He dined in the finest restaurants in New York City, but was eventually arrested for fraud.

Next Weyman took on roles as a military attaché from Serbia and a U.S. Navy lieutenant, with each identity using the other as a reference. He was soon caught.

Weyman was released the second time in 1915. He then became Lieutenant Commander Ethan Allen Weinberg, Consul General for Romania. He inspected the USS Wyoming and invited everyone to dinner at the Astor Hotel. The advance publicity alerted the Bureau of Investigation and federal agents arrested him at the party. He was heard to complain that they should have waited until dessert. He got a year in jail.

In 1917, he took on the mantle of Royal St. Cyr, a lieutenant in the British Army Air Corps. He was arrested when he was on an inspection tour of the Brooklyn Armory after a suspicious military tailor alerted the police.

Weyman was paroled in 1920. Shortly afterwards he forged credentials to become a company doctor in Lima, Peru. There he threw lavish parties until his credit ran out and he was arrested.

In 1921 he noticed Princess Fatima of Afghanistan, who was visiting the United States and was trying to get official recognition. The U.S. State Department mainly ignored her. Weyman visited her as a State Department Naval Liaison Officer, apologized for the oversight and promised to arrange an appointment with the President. He managed to convince the princess to give him 10,000 dollars for "presents" to State Department officials. He used the money for a private railway carriage to Washington, D.C., and an opulent hotel room in the Willard Hotel for the princess and her entourage.

Weyman proceeded to visit the State Department, dropped names of prominent senators and succeeded in getting appointments for the princess, first with Secretary of State Charles Evans Hughes, and, on July 26, 1921, with President Warren G. Harding. Weyman's minor mistakes in protocol aroused some suspicion, but after the press published pictures showing him alongside dignitaries he was indicted for impersonating a naval officer and sentenced to two years in jail.

On another occasion, the Evening Graphic hired Weyman to get an interview with the visiting Queen Marie of Romania. He gained admittance as the Secretary of State and the paper got its interview.

In 1926 Weyman appeared at Rudolph Valentino's funeral and attached himself to Valentino's grieving lover Pola Negri as a personal physician. He issued regular press releases on her condition and established a faith-healing clinic in Valentino's house. Pola Negri did not condemn him after he was exposed.

During World War II Weyman was sentenced to seven years in prison for offering advice to draft dodgers on how to feign various medical conditions.

In 1948 Weyman made up credentials to become a journalist at the United Nations in Lake Success, New York. He got acquainted with the delegates Warren Austin and Andrei Gromyko. His comeuppance came when the Thai delegation invited him to become their press officer with full diplomatic accreditation. Weyman contacted the State Department and asked whether it would affect his U.S. citizenship, thus drawing attention to himself.

In 1954 Weyman tried to get a home improvement loan of 5,000 dollars for a house that did not exist. He failed to convince the judge that he was insane.

In August 1960, Weyman was fatally shot when he tried to stop a robbery at a hotel in New York City where he was working as a night porter. The investigating detective said: "I've known about the man's past record for years. He did a lot of things in the course of his life, but what he did this time was brave."
