= Christodora House =

Residential skyscraper in Manhattan, New York

- U.S. National Register of Historic Places
- New York State Register of Historic Places
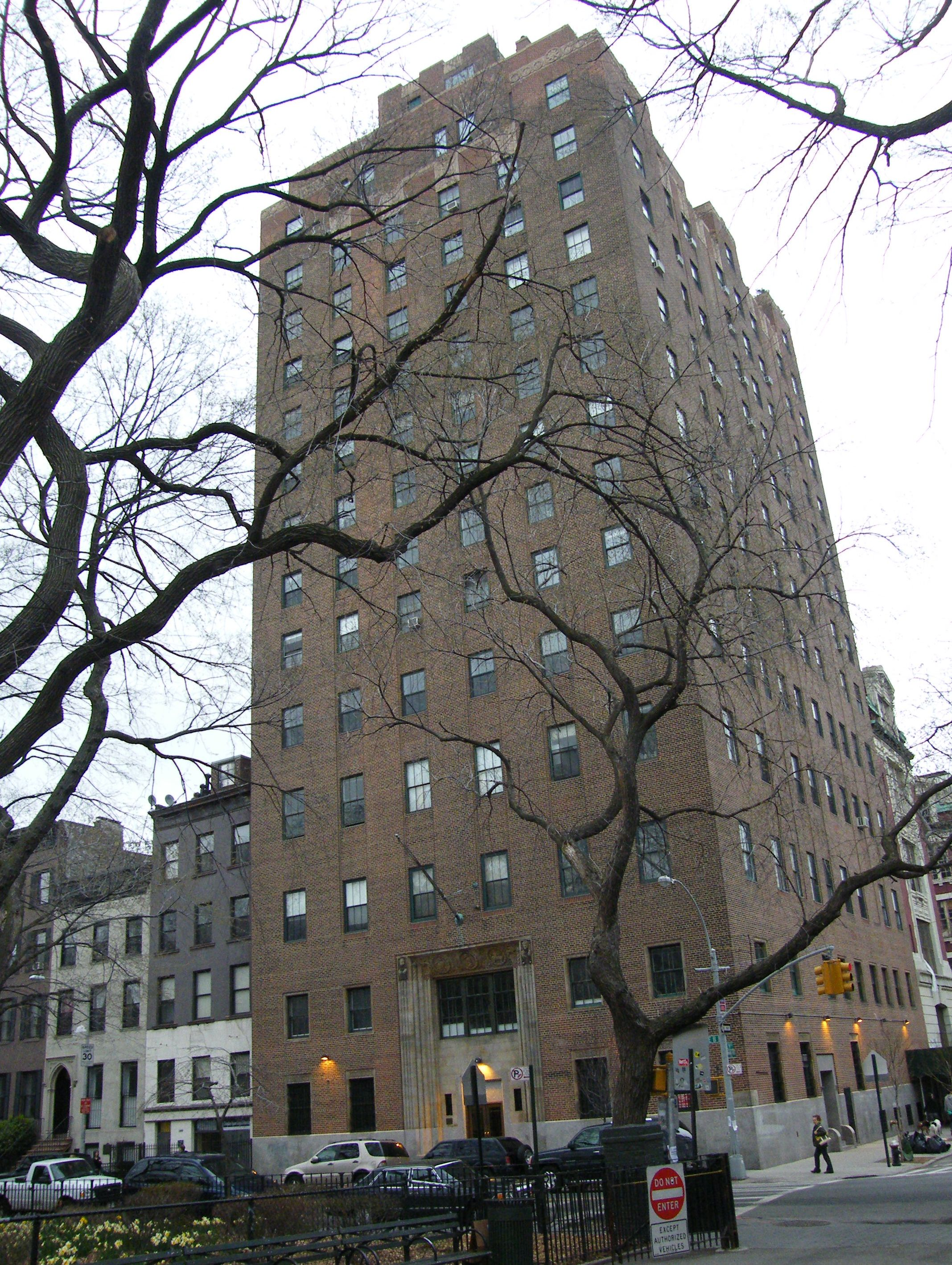

- Location within Manhattan Location within New York Location within the United States
- Location: 143 Avenue B, New York, New York
- Coordinates: 40°43′35″N 73°58′48″W
- Built: 1928
- Architect: Henry C. Pelton
- NRHP reference No.: 86000486
- NYSRHP No.: 06101.001679

Significant dates
- Added to NRHP: March 20, 1986
- Designated NYSRHP: February 7, 1986

Christodora House is a historic building located at 143 Avenue B in the East Village/Alphabet City neighborhoods of Manhattan, New York City. It was designed by architect Henry C. Pelton (architect of Riverside Church) in the American Perpendicular Style and constructed in 1928 as a settlement house for low-income and immigrant residents, providing food, shelter, and educational and health services.

== Description ==
The building, as originally conceived, included a gym, swimming pool, music school and theater. It was financed by Mr and Mrs Arthur Curtiss James, at a cost of over $1 million.

Initially, the 16 stories of the building housed a music school, a pool and gymnasium, a library, clubhouses, workshops, offices, and two kitchens. These spaces were on the lower five floors of the building, and open to the public and settlement members. One floor housed the settlement workers, and the top nine floors were rented out as residences to provide income for the work of the settlement. The opening of the building was widely covered in the newspapers of the day. The building, particularly its height and style, were intended to be seen as symbolic and inspiring: towering, modern, up to date, airy, clean and fireproof, its character representing the best in the character of the neighborhood. Today, the building hosts a diverse group of residences. Many are groups or organizations active in the community, such as The East Village Community Coalition, which has an office in the building.

The swimming pool and gymnasium can no longer be used. Zoning for these facilities stipulated "community access," and the facilities cannot be modified to provide the disabled access mandated by law.

== History ==
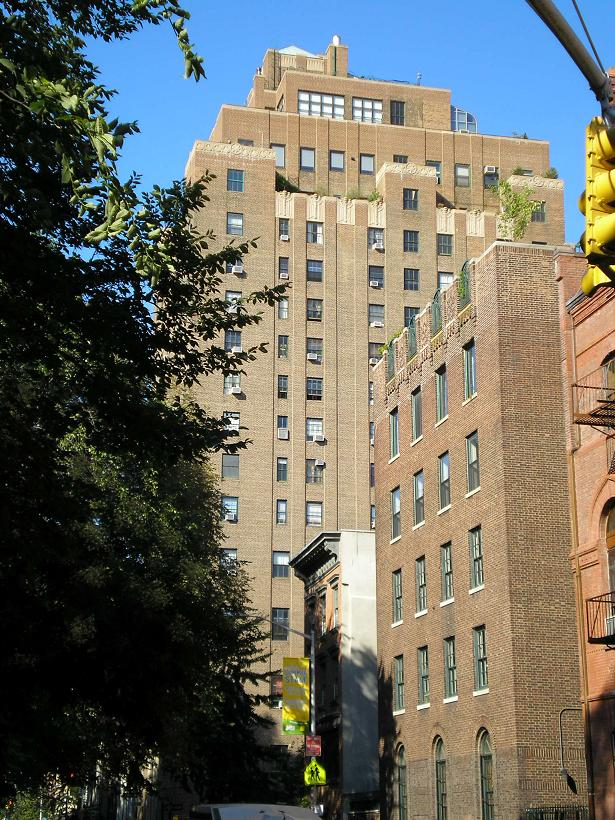
The Christodora House, pictured in 2006

The difficulties operating a settlement community and a "residential" community created complications for the Christodora Board of Managers. These financial burdens, coupled with the expansion of public housing, led the building to be sold via condemnation to the City of New York in 1948 for $1.6 million. The city planned to house delinquent boys in the building, operated by the Department of Welfare. However, for reasons which remain unclear the building remained empty or underutilized through 1956.

In the mid-1960s, a variety of unsanctioned community activities took place in the lower floors of the buildings. Police raided and closed the building in 1969. Use of the space continued. Stories from this period include that the national headquarters of the Black Panthers was housed in the building, and that it was used as the setting for several pornographic films. The city sold the property for $62,500 in 1975.

By 1986, the building had been sold numerous times, and began to be converted into condominiums. For many area residents, this was the first sign of gentrification.

On March 20, 1986, Christodora House was added to the National Register of Historic Places

The August 7, 1988 Tompkins Square Park Riot, provoked partially by the area's gentrification, spilled over into Christodora House. Rioters chanted "Die Yuppie Scum" in reference to the supposed "yuppie scum" residents of the building. The front doors were smashed and rioters ransacked the lobby of the building.

== Notable residents ==
Famous past or present residents include Walter Tandy Murch, Iggy Pop, Vincent D'Onofrio, Freedy Johnston, Marisa Monte, George Pendle, Andres Levin, Douglas Rushkoff, and Michael Rosen.

Hedge fund manager Brian Kim owned and lived in an apartment at Christodora House. He was indicted and arrested in 2009, and accused of stealing $435,000 from the Christodora House condo association in 2008. He fled to Hong Kong in 2011, but was apprehended and sent back to the U.S. In 2012, he admitted to the theft.

== See also ==
- National Register of Historic Places listings in Manhattan below 14th Street
