= Dick King (American football) =

American football player (1895–1930)

Profile
- Positions: Halfback, fullback, wingback, tailback

Personal information
- Born: February 9, 1895; Boston, Massachusetts, U.S.
- Died: October 16, 1930 (aged 35); Bogotá, Colombia
- Listed height: 5 ft 8 in (1.73 m)
- Listed weight: 175 lb (79 kg)

Career information
- High school: Boston Latin
- College: Harvard

Career history

Playing
- 1917–1919: Pine Village
- 1919–1921: Hammond Pros
- 1922: Milwaukee Badgers
- 1922: Rochester Jeffersons
- 1923: St. Louis All-Stars

Coaching
- 1916: Wisconsin (backfield)
- 1917–1919: Pine Village

Awards and highlights
- Consensus All-American (1915)

Richard Stewart Cutter King (February 9, 1895 - October 16, 1930) was an American football running back. He played college football for Harvard University and was selected as an All-American at halfback) in 1915. In 1916, he signed with the Pine Village professional football team, becoming one of the first eastern football stars to play professional football. He also played professionally for the Hammond Pros, Milwaukee Badgers, Rochester Jeffersons, and St. Louis All-Stars.

== Athlete and All-American at Harvard ==
A native of Boston, Massachusetts, King attended the Boston Latin School before enrolling at Harvard University. He was 5 feet, 8 inches in height and weighed 175 pounds. At the time of his selection as an All-American in 1915, King was not the typical Harvard athlete. He was married and had two children (a two-year-old daughter and a six-month-old son), and was working his way through college. He first tried out for the freshman football team in 1912. At that time, he knew little or nothing about the game and "did not even threaten to 'make' the team." He failed to make the varsity team as sophomore and was also rejected by the baseball team and crew. In 1914, King made the cut for Harvard's varsity football team, but saw limited playing time as a substitute.

King did not start a game for Harvard until his senior year, and was selected as an All-American in his first full year playing the game. He played halfback for the 1915 Harvard team that boasted one of the best backfields in the early years of college football with King, Eddie Mahan and Hardwick. With Harvard's opponents focused on stopping three-time All-American Mahan, King was able to score the only touchdown on a 30-yard run in Harvard's 1915 victory over Princeton. After King's "long leap in the lair of the Princeton Tigers," one writer noted King's progression from scrub to star: "Stubborn Dick King, once the lowliest of scrubs, now stands full flush at the entrance to the Harvard gallery of big football heroes."

At the end of the 1915 season, Walter Camp and Fielding H. Yost both named King to their first-team All-American squads, and Chicago football expert Walter Eckersall selected him as a second-team All-American.

== Football coach at Wisconsin ==
After graduating from Harvard in 1916, King accepted a position as the backfield coach for the University of Wisconsin. He served in that capacity for only one year. The Wisconsin State Journal called him one of the school's most important coaches, noting that he had instilled his "fighting spirit" in the Wisconsin backfield. In October 1916, King announced that he had been offered a position as an engineer with a South American mining operation. He planned to leave for South America at the conclusion of the football season.

== Pioneer of professional football ==
In November 1916, while still serving as a coach at Wisconsin, King signed with "the famous Pine Village team"—one of the first professional football teams. King was hired as both a player and coach, and was the highest paid player on the team. In signing with Pine Village, King became "one of the first of the eastern greats to step into the pro ranks." Prior to 1917, professional football had attracted only a narrow following, principally in Ohio and Indiana. Professional football was viewed as unworthy of graduates of major universities, and college stars who played in the early days of professional football frequently used assumed names to hide their identities.

In 1916, the Pine Village team consisted of King and a group of former players from Indiana University. By signing King, Pine Village hoped to bring the sophistication of Eastern football to Indiana.

In December 1916, Pine Village played a highly anticipated game against the Hammond Pros for the championship of Indiana. In the build-up to the game, one Indiana newspaper focused on Pine Village's acquisition of King:

"The Pine Village aggregation is one of the strongest in the entire country and is composed almost entirely of ex-college players who have won berths on All-American, All-Western and All-Conference elevens. Among the stars with Pine Village are Dick King, of Harvard, All-American halfback in 1915, and the greatest fullback playing today. He is the highest salaried player on the Pine Village team and his stipend per game runs well into three figures. King is a wonderful line plunger and on nearly all of his runs carries from three to five men along with him for several yards."

King continued to play for Pine Village from 1917–1919, and was known both for his coaching and his "line-plunging" skills. In 1919, a Fort Wayne newspaper noted:

"King acts as coach for the Pine Village outfit and local fandom can expect to see some wonderful interference displayed by the Pine Village team. King is a firm believer in interference, profiting by his experience at Harvard, where this branch of the game went a long way in making Harvard teams invincible in the four years preceding the war."

The publicity for the fledgling Indiana professional circuit may have peaked in 1919 when Hammond signed another major eastern star, quarterback Eddy from Princeton. King was the star of the Indiana league, and when the teams featuring King and Eddy met in November 1919, one Indiana newspaper noted, "King hits the line like a streak and is seldom stopped before he reaches the secondary defense." In another article, an Indiana paper wrote, "King needs no introduction to local fans, as he is a former All-American back with a country wide reputation and perhaps the greatest line plunger in the game today."

King also played for the Hammond Pros from 1919 to 1921, the Milwaukee Badgers and Rochester Jeffersons in 1922, and the St. Louis All-Stars in 1923.

The 1919 Hammond Pros, featuring King (and a rookie named George Halas), had a payroll of $20,000 for eleven players, said to be one of the highest team payrolls in the history of professional football to that time. Also in 1919, an Indiana newspaper called King "one of the greatest backs who ever wore moleskins" and noted: "As a line plunger, King ranks with the best in the game, while his ability to place kick from anywhere within the 50-yard mark makes a score possible for his team whenever the ball is advanced into enemy territory."

== Personal life and death ==
King's first marriage, to Hazel Hatch, ended in divorce in May 1918. On March 1, 1919, at Crown Point Indiana King married Vera I Ketrick of Chicago. The marriage of the famous football player to Ketrick drew press attention focusing on the fact that King's new bride was a two-time divorcee. One Indiana newspaper reported: "Famous Football Player, Once Divorced, Takes a Twice Divorced Wife."

King died of pneumonia on October 16, 1930, at a hospital in Bogotá, Colombia, where he had been working as a South American sales representative for the Gillette Company.
