= St. Louis All-Stars =

American National Football League team (1923)

General information
- Founded: 1923
- Folded: 1923
- Stadium: Sportsman's Park
- Headquartered: St. Louis, Missouri, United States
- Colors: Red, white, blue

Personnel
- Owner: Ollie Kraehe
- Head coach: Ollie Kraehe

Team history
- St. Louis All-Stars (1923)

League / conference affiliations
- National Football League

St. Louis All-Stars was a professional football team that played in the National Football League during the 1923 season. The team played at St. Louis, Missouri's Sportsman's Park. Ollie Kraehe owned, managed, coached, and played guard for the team.

== History ==
=== Origins ===
The idea for the All-Stars came to Ollie Kraehe while he was still a substitute offensive lineman playing for the Rock Island Independents. Kraehe figured that if small towns markets, like Green Bay and Rock Island, could be successful operating a professional football team, then operating in a larger market like St. Louis would bring in even more income. He was a local football hero in St. Louis since he had played college football at Washington University in St. Louis, alongside Jimmy Conzelman, and had captained the 1921 team.

=== Building the franchise ===
==== Team ====
In 1923, NFL President Joe Carr gave Kraehe an NFL franchise. He paid $100 (about $1,600 in 2021) for the franchise and began organizing a team about a month before the 1923 season was to start. He also named his club the "All-Stars", however, he soon discovered that there was a lack of All-American talent available. Many of the players were locals who came from St. Louis University and Washington University. Kraehe later stated that, "There were some players who didn't want their parents to know they were in the game and some of them used fictitious names". He also admitted that, "there were some who pretended to be All-Americans from the East just to get a chance to play".

One of the most notorious All-American impostors for the All-Stars was a man using the alias Jack "Dolly" Gray. Gray claimed to be the All-American end from Princeton's 1922 "Team of Destiny;" it soon became obvious that the impostor was not the Princeton end (for one, the man whose identity Gray was trying to steal was actually named Howard "Howdy" Gray) and was nowhere near as talented. Ollie Kraehe sold Gray to the Green Bay Packers after a game between the two. Packers chairman Curly Lambeau believed that he had just acquired Howdy Gray, who would have been by far the All-Stars' best player, but Lambeau soon discovered he had been hoodwinked after watching his new end perform so badly the next game that he addressed Kraehe on the matter. Kraehe told Lambeau that trading away the impostor was meant as a "joke" and that he would return the money paid for Gray to Lambeau.

However some established players like Bub Weller, an all-American from Nebraska, and Dick King, an all-American from Harvard, did play for the team. The All-Stars were big but slow, very much defense-oriented. They would give up only 15 points in their first five games, but on the other hand, they would fail to score a touchdown.

==== Stadium ====
Kraehe also needed a home field for his All-Stars to play. In 1923, the St. Louis Browns owned Sportsman's Park. Kraehe was able to work out an agreement where the Browns would receive 15 percent of gross revenue, or 20 percent if the gross was more than $10,000. There were two stipulations for using the field. First, the All-Stars could practice on the outfield grass from October 10 to December 2 only if it did not interfere with the St. Louis University team's practice. The second stipulation ended the All-Stars stadium deal if there was a World Series game played in St. Louis (something that did not materialize; for the third straight season, the 1923 World Series was played entirely in New York).

=== 1923 season ===
The All-Stars began the 1923 season with a 25–0 defeat of a team from Murphysboro, Illinois in a non-league game. For the second game, the All-Stars played the Green Bay Packers to a scoreless tie at Bellevue Park. They followed up with another scoreless tie against the Hammond Pros.

However, the All-Stars were losing money. Kraehe lost more than $2,000, as only 719 spectators attended the team's home opener at Sportsman's Park. He blamed the low attendance on rainy weather and the fact that most sports fans were concentrating on the World Series being played in New York City. However, the lack of offense from the All-Stars made the St. Louis fans reluctant to spend their money to see a team that had not scored a touchdown in their first four NFL games. The All-Stars lost their second and third NFL games to the Cleveland Indians and the Milwaukee Badgers. Both scores resulted in 6–0 losses. The team also lost a fifth game to the Packers in front of a home crowd of only 750. The All-stars held the Packers scoreless for most of the game until Cub Buck kicked a 28-yard field goal to give the Packers a 3–0 win.

Things did take a turn for the better when the All-Stars played the Oorang Indians, featuring Jim Thorpe, in front of 5,000 fans the following week. The Indians were a popular attraction in the early NFL. They were more of a novelty team and not considered to be very good. This raised the All-Stars' hopes for a victory, or at least a touchdown. Al Casey scored both of St. Louis' touchdowns in a 14–7 All-Stars win. Meanwhile, Thorpe threw a touchdown pass to put the Indians on the scoreboard. The Indians' visit helped ease the team's financial losses.

Two weeks later, The All-Stars played the Milwaukee Badgers in a rematch at Sportsman's Park. The Badgers' Jimmy Conzelman was one of St. Louis' most popular athletes and Kraehe hoped that his presence would put fans in the stands. 2,395 fans paid to see Conzelman and the Badgers win 17–0 (a better crowd than usual, but still below expectations).

=== The end ===
Kraehe estimated the financial losses for the All-Stars at $1,300 for the Badgers' game and $6,300 for the season. He was forced to cancel his final NFL game of the season against the Cleveland Indians, as injuries left the All-Stars unable to field a team.

Afterwards, he took what was left of his team to Benld, Illinois, and lost to a local team 9–7. In September 1924, Kraehe sold the All-Stars franchise back to the NFL, who cancelled it.

St. Louis would later become a stop for other NFL teams:

- The St. Louis Gunners very briefly joined the NFL at the end of the 1934 season.
- The Cardinals, who relocated from Chicago in 1960, played in the city until 1987, when the team relocated to Arizona.
- The St. Louis Rams, who relocated from Los Angeles in 1995, played in the city until 2015, when the team relocated back to Los Angeles.

== Season-by-season ==
Year	W	L	T	Finish	Coach
1923	1	4	2	14th	Ollie Kraehe
