= Dolly Gray impostor =

American football player

Jack "Dolly" Gray
Profile
- Position: End

Personal information
- Listed height: 5 ft 11 in (1.80 m)
- Listed weight: 175 lb (79 kg)

Career information
- College: Princeton

Career history
- St. Louis All-Stars (1923); Green Bay Packers (1923)
- Stats at Pro Football Reference

The Dolly Gray impostor, also known as Jack "Dolly" Gray, was an unknown American football player who played for the St. Louis All-Stars and Green Bay Packers during the 1923 National Football League (NFL) season. The impostor played under an alias, claiming to be an All-American from Princeton University in 1922; the only known player with the surname "Gray" to be awarded consensus All-American honors at Princeton in 1922 was Howdy Gray, who was also an end.

The impostor first tricked Ollie Kraehe, the owner and player-coach of the All-Stars. However, after a few games of poor play on the field, Kraehe realized his error. Instead of releasing "Gray", he exchanged him for cash with the Packers. "Gray" played only one game for the Packers and then disappeared. A few weeks later, Packers head coach Curly Lambeau cornered Kraehe after a game against the All-Stars; Kraehe admitted to the deception but said that it was only done as a joke. The impostor's identity remains unknown.

== Background ==
Howard Kramer "Howdy" Gray played as an end for the 1922 Princeton Tigers football team, which had a record of 8–0 and were named National Champions for that year. He was the only known player with the surname "Gray" to be awarded consensus All-American honors at Princeton in 1922; he was also part of the 1922 College Football All-America Team. On September 29, 1923, the Green Bay Press-Gazette reported that "Howard 'Dolly' Gray, regular left end on the Princeton varsity team of last season, is the latest addition" to the St. Louis All-Stars, a recently formed NFL team owned by Ollie Kraehe.

== Professional career ==
=== St. Louis All-Stars ===
Sources differ on the number of games played by "Gray" for St. Louis, but what is clear is that he participated in a game against the Green Bay Packers on October 7, 1923. The Press-Gazette noted that "Gray" was an All-American, started at the end position for St. Louis, and played well. A St. Louis newspaper noted that a "Jack Gray" injured his shoulder during the game. "Gray" was mentioned in various game summaries in local newspapers for the rest of the month, likely playing in his last game for St. Louis on October 21. Kraehe had at least witnessed "Gray's" poor performance and understood that the man playing for him was not likely to have been an All-American college football player. He sold "Gray" to the Packers, knowing that he was deceiving head coach Curly Lambeau into giving up what appeared to be one of his better players. Kraehe's purpose for selling "Gray" was to recoup funds to help keep his team financially viable.

=== Green Bay Packers ===
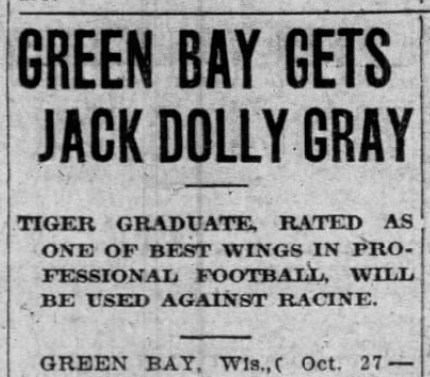
A newspaper clipping from October 1923 noting the signing of "Jack Dolly Gray" by the Packers.

With local newspapers playing up "Gray's" performance, it appeared that the Packers had received an All-American football player. Local Wisconsin newspapers noted "Gray's" speed and stated that he was "one of the greatest ends that ever wore the orange and black" (Princeton's colors). Gray officially played in one game for the Packers, a 24–3 loss to the Racine Legion on October 28. Gray was noted in pre-game coverage as the newest addition to the Packers' team and in post-game coverage it was mentioned he recovered a fumble. A few weeks later, the Packers played the All-Stars again, winning 3–0. After the game, Curly Lambeau cornered Kraehe and questioned him about "Gray". Lambeau stated that "Gray" played poorly and then disappeared after boarding the train for the team's game against St. Louis. Kraehe admitted to the ruse, saying that it was done as a joke and that he had always intended to return the money the Packers spent to purchase "Gray". St. Louis' team was dissolved at the end of the season, while the true identity of the impostor remained unknown.

== Identity ==
Packers historian Cliff Christl noted in a 2024 article that the true identity of the impostor is unlikely to ever be solved. He noted a few challenges: "Goodbye, Dolly Gray" was a common battle chant during the 1898 Spanish-American War and the name "Dolly Gray" was extremely common, both for men and women. Additionally, three separate names, all with the surname "Gray", were used by various newspapers to reference an end from Princeton who played in 1922. In addition to the impostor merely fooling everyone, Christl also speculated that the All-Stars may have used the signing as a publicity stunt or that early sportswriters were "guilty of puffery" after assuming that "Gray" was the famous end from Princeton.

== See also ==
- Barry Bremen, an imposter who posed as a player in multiple sports teams
- Randy Johnson (offensive lineman), a later pro football player who was the target of an impostor
