= Costa Rica–Jamaica–Mexico–United States 2031 FIFA Women's World Cup bid =

FIFA Women's World Cup host nation bid

Costa Rica, Jamaica, Mexico, United States bid
- for the 2031 FIFA Women's World Cup

Bid details
- Bidding nation: Costa Rica, Jamaica, Mexico, United States
- Bidding federation: FCRF, JFF, FMF, USSF
- Proposed venues: 100 (out of 100 proposals) (in 100 (out of 100 proposals) cities)

The Costa Rica–Jamaica–Mexico–the United States bid for the 2031 FIFA Women's World Cup is a joint bid to host the 2031 FIFA Women's World Cup by the football associations of Costa Rica, Jamaica, Mexico, and the United States. The bid was announced on October 20, 2025. The slogan of the bid is titled: "For Now, For Next".

== Background ==
On April 29, 2024, the United States Soccer Federation and Mexican Football Federation jointly announced that they would withdraw their bid for the 2027 FIFA Women's World Cup and instead bid for the 2031 edition. The United States previously hosted the 1999 edition and 2003 edition, while Mexico has never hosted a Women's World Cup. Both countries are co-hosts of the men's 2026 FIFA World Cup alongside Canada; media outlets speculated that the close proximity of the two events along with the 2028 Summer Olympics in Los Angeles may have been a factor in the changed bid plan. Other FIFA and confederation events the two countries have hosted are the 1970 World Cup, 1983 World Youth Championship, 1986 World Cup, 1999 Confederations Cup, and 2011 U-17 World Cup for Mexico and the 1994 World Cup, Copa América Centenario, 2024 Copa América, and 2025 FIFA Club World Cup for the United States. In addition, both countries have hosted the CONCACAF Gold Cup. On January 15, 2025, USSF president Cindy Parlow Cone confirmed the two nations would bid as soon as FIFA announces the bidding process. On March 5, 2025, the USSF announced that it had started the bidding process and later stated that month that they intended to expand the bid to other members in Central America and the Caribbean. On April 3, 2025, FIFA declared the United States bid the sole valid bid for 2031. Mexico later confirmed their involvement in the bid on May 27, 2025. Costa Rica and Jamaica later joined on October 20, 2025.

Jamaica have previously co-hosted the CONCACAF Gold Cup in 2019, Costa Rica had hosted the FIFA youth tournaments including the U-17 level in 2014 and the U-20 level in 2022. Mexico has been the host for the men's competitions including the senior levels in 1970 and 1986 and the United States have hosted the FIFA Women's World Cup twice in 1999 and 2003 along with the men's competition in 1994. Both Mexico and the United States will co-host the 2026 along with Canada.

== Proposed venues ==
In its hosting requirements document, FIFA stipulated that the 32-team competition would have a minimum of eight stadiums, of which at least five were to be existing venues. The stadiums would have minimum seating capacities of 20,000 for most matches, 40,000 for the semifinals, and 65,000 for the opener and final. However, additional changes will be made to accommodate the expansion to 48.

In Costa Rica, the only city interested is San José.

In Jamaica, the only city interested is Kingston.

In Mexico, 19 cities are interested: Guadalajara, Mexico City, Monterrey, Pachuca, Querétaro, and Torreón.

In the United States, more than 30 regions featuring existing stadiums have shown interest, including Atlanta, Baltimore, Birmingham, Boston, Charlotte, Chicago, Cincinnati, Cleveland, Columbus, Dallas–Fort Worth, Denver, Houston, Indianapolis, Kansas City, Los Angeles, Miami, Minneapolis, Nashville, New York/New Jersey, Orlando, Philadelphia, Phoenix, Portland, Salt Lake City, San Diego, the San Francisco Bay Area, Seattle, St. Louis, the Tampa Bay Area, and Washington, D.C., with bidding set to begin in the coming years.Additionally, the New Stadium at RFK Campus in Washington, D.C., is planned to be completed in 2030 as to be eligible as a host venue.

On November 28, 2025, the bid book listed 20 possible stadiums that the bidding committee had in mind, with additional stadiums mentioned as well. No official statement has been made yet on when the host city selection process will begin.

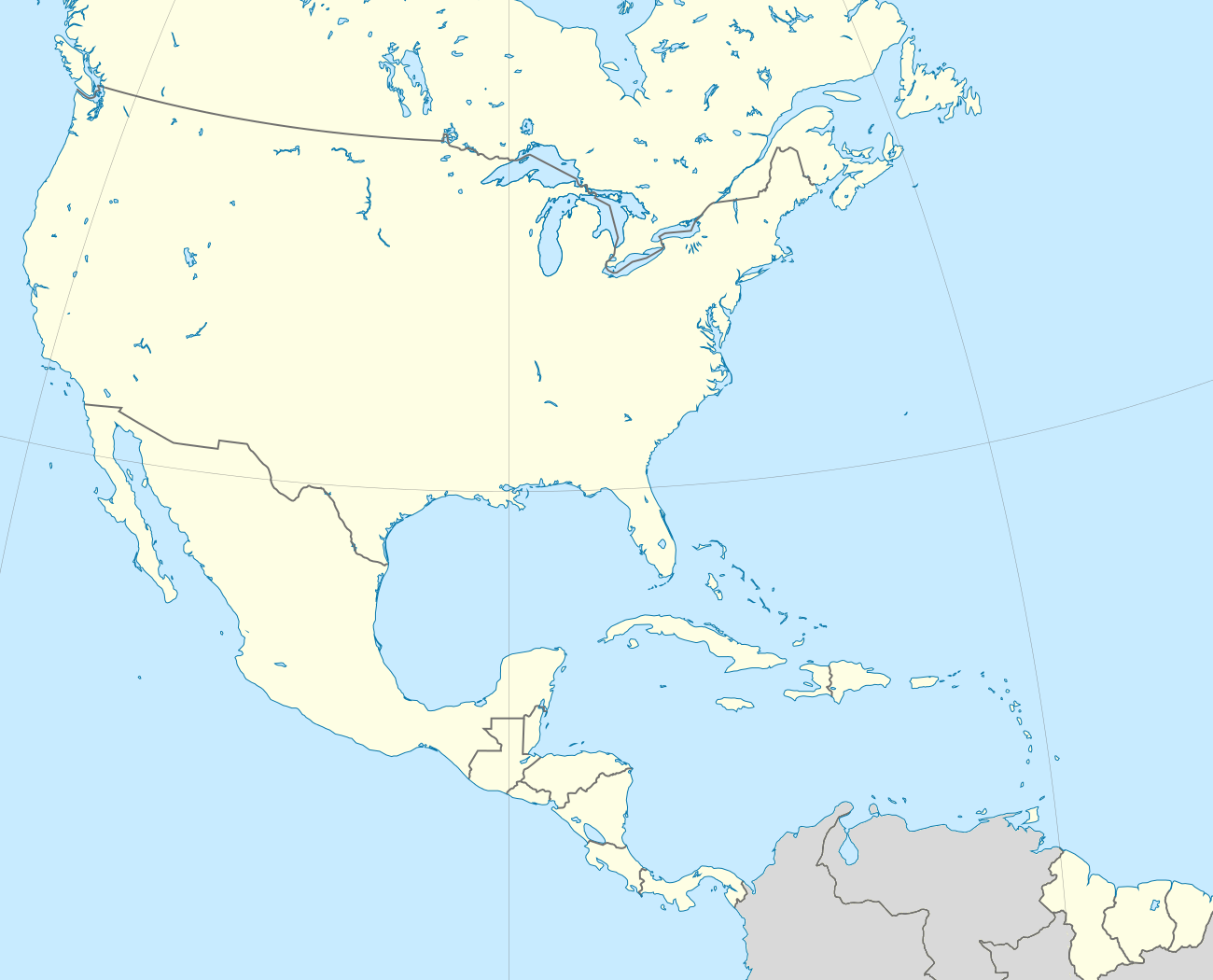
Shortlisted locations

A † denotes a stadium used for previous Women's World Cup tournaments.
A ‡ denotes an indoor stadium with a fixed or retractable roof with interior climate control.

List of proposed host cities and sample stadiums
| Country | City | Stadium | Capacity | Image |
|---|---|---|---|---|
| United States | New York/New Jersey (East Rutherford, New Jersey) | MetLife Stadium | 82,500 | |
| United States | Dallas (Arlington, Texas) | AT&T Stadium‡ | 80,000 (expandable to 105,000) | |
| United States | Kansas City | Arrowhead Stadium | 76,416 | |
| United States | Denver | Empower Field at Mile High | 76,125 | |
| United States | Charlotte | Bank of America Stadium | 75,037 | |
| United States | Houston | Reliant Stadium‡ | 72,220 (expandable to 80,000) | |
| United States | Atlanta | Mercedes-Benz Stadium‡ | 71,000 (expandable to 83,000) | |
| United States | Los Angeles (Inglewood, California) | SoFi Stadium | 70,240 (expandable to 100,240) | |
| United States | Seattle | Lumen Field | 68,740 (expandable to 72,000) | |
| United States | Minneapolis | U.S. Bank Stadium‡ | 66,202 (expandable to 73,000) | |
| United States | Washington, D.C. | New Stadium at RFK Campus‡ | 65,000 | |
| United States | Chicago | Soldier Field | 62,500 | |
| United States | Orlando | Camping World Stadium | 60,219 (expandable to 65,194) | |
| United States | San Diego | Snapdragon Stadium | 35,000 (expandable to 55,000) | |
| United States | Nashville | Geodis Park | 30,109 | |
| United States | Portland | Providence Park | 24,686 | |
| Mexico | Mexico City | Estadio Banorte | 87,523 | |
| Mexico | Monterrey (Guadalupe) | Estadio BBVA | 53,500 (bid book: 53,460) | |
| Mexico | Guadalajara (Zapopan) | Estadio Akron | 49,813 (bid book: 48,071) | |
| Mexico | Torreón | Estadio Corona | 29,101 | |
| Costa Rica | San José | Costa Rica National Stadium | 35,000 | |
| Jamaica | Kingston | Independence Park | 37,500 (after renovation) | |

List of backup host cities and sample stadiums
| Country | City | Stadium | Capacity | Image |
|---|---|---|---|---|
| United States | Los Angeles | Los Angeles Memorial Coliseum | 77,500 | |
| United States | Los Angeles (Pasadena, California) | Rose Bowl† | 72,000 (after renovation) | |
| United States | Baltimore | M&T Bank Stadium | 70,745 | |
| United States | Tampa Bay (Tampa, Florida) | Raymond James Stadium | 69,218 (expandable to 75,000) | |
| United States | San Francisco Bay Area (Santa Clara, California) | Levi's Stadium | 68,500 (bid book: 70,909) (expandable to 75,000) | |
| United States | Philadelphia | Lincoln Financial Field† | 67,594 (bid book: 69,328) | |
| United States | Cleveland (Brook Park, Ohio) | New Huntington Bank Field‡ | 67,000 | |
| United States | Boston (Foxborough, Massachusetts) | Gillette Stadium† | 64,628 (bid book: 70,000) | Gillette Stadium |
| United States | Phoenix (Glendale, Arizona) | State Farm Stadium | 63,400 (expandable to 72,200) | |
| United States | Nashville | Nissan Stadium‡ | 60,000 | |
| United States | Birmingham | Protective Stadium | 47,100 | |
| United States | San Francisco Bay Area (San Francisco) | Oracle Park | 42,000 | |
| United States | Los Angeles (Carson, California) | Dignity Health Sports Park† | 27,000 | |
| United States | Cincinnati | TQL Stadium | 26,000 | |
| United States | Orlando | Inter.co Stadium | 25,500 | |
| United States | New York/New Jersey (New York City) | Etihad Park | 25,000 | |
| United States | New York/New Jersey (Harrison, New Jersey) | Sports Illustrated Stadium | 25,000 | |
| United States | Dallas (Frisco, Texas) | Toyota Stadium | 22,500 (after renovation) | |
| United States | St. Louis | Energizer Park | 22,423 | |
| United States | Chicago | McDonald's Park | 22,000 | |
| United States | Miami (Fort Lauderdale, Florida) | Inter Miami CF Stadium | 21,550 | |
| United States | Houston | Shell Energy Stadium | 20,656 | |
| United States | Salt Lake City (Sandy, Utah) | America First Field | 20,213 | |
| United States | Columbus | ScottsMiracle-Gro Field | 20,371 | |
| United States | Indianapolis | Eleven Park | 20,000 | |
| United States | Washington, D.C. | Audi Field | 20,000 | |
| United States | Kansas City | CPKC Stadium | 11,500 (to be expanded to 18,000) | |
| Mexico | Monterrey (San Nicolás de los Garza) | Estadio Universitario | 41,886 | |
| Mexico | Querétaro | Estadio Corregidora | 34,130 | |
| Mexico | Pachuca | Estadio Hidalgo | 25,922 | |
| Costa Rica | San José | Estadio Ricardo Saprissa Aymá | 23,112 | |

== See also ==
- 2031 FIFA Women's World Cup
- Costa Rica women's national football team
- Jamaica women's national football team
- Mexico women's national football team
- United States women's national soccer team
