= List of current NFL stadiums =

List of current stadiums of the National Football League

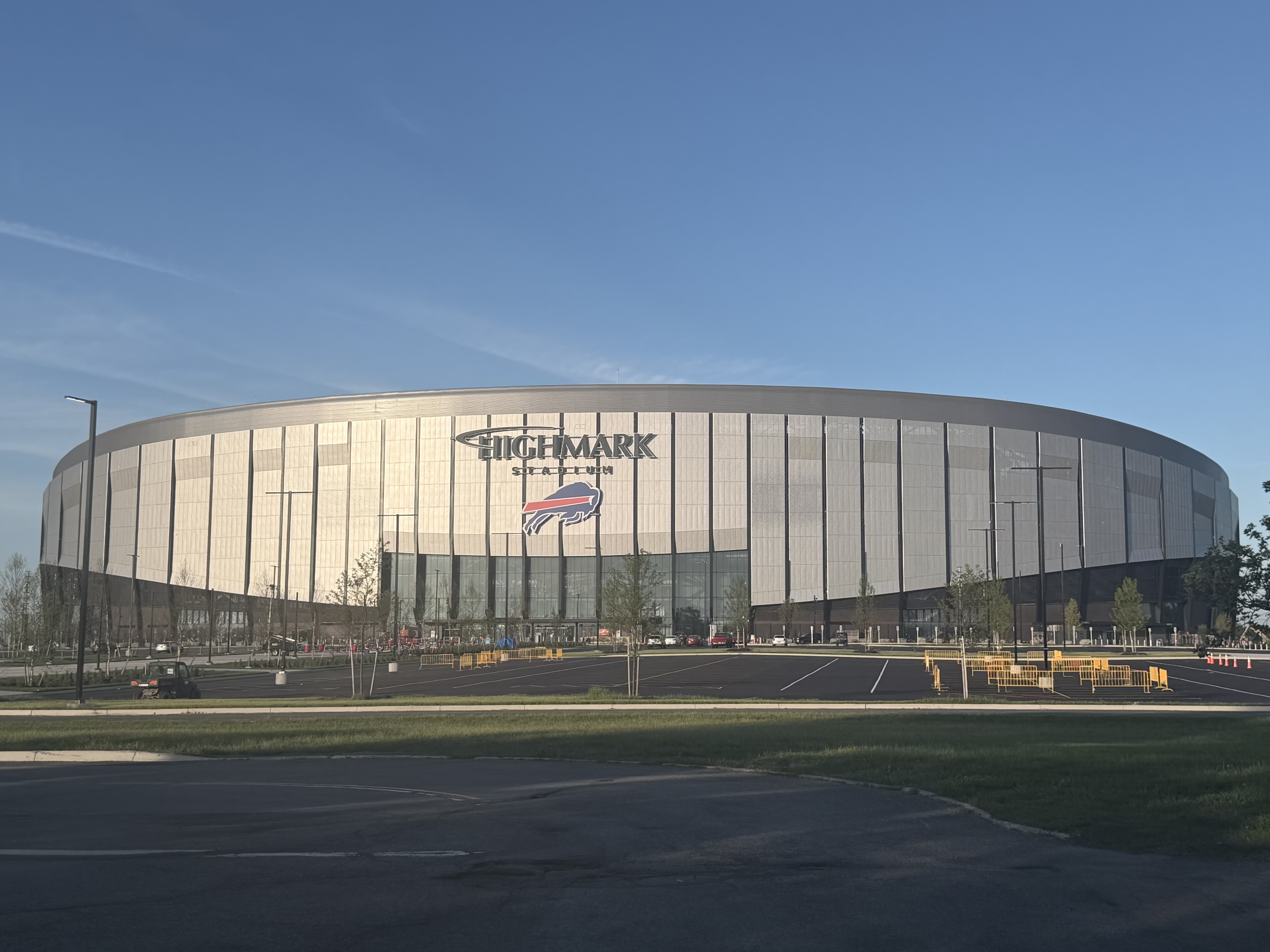
Highmark Stadium, home of the Buffalo Bills, is the newest stadium in the National Football League. It opened in 2026.

This list of current NFL stadiums includes their locations, capacities, year opened, and home teams. Although the NFL has 32 teams, there are only 30 full-time NFL stadiums, as the New York Giants and New York Jets share MetLife Stadium, and the Los Angeles Chargers and Los Angeles Rams share SoFi Stadium.

The latest NFL stadium to open is Highmark Stadium, home of the Buffalo Bills, which opened for the 2026 season. Soldier Field in Chicago is the oldest, having opened in 1924; however, the Bears did not play at Soldier Field until 1971 and did not play there in 2002 while the stadium was under reconstruction, and thus the oldest continuously operating stadium in the NFL is Lambeau Field, hosting the Green Bay Packers since its opening in 1957.

The NFL uses several other stadiums in addition to the teams' designated regular home sites. Two English venues – Tottenham Hotspur Stadium and Wembley Stadium, are used as part of the NFL International Series. Other international stadiums hosting games include the Melbourne Cricket Ground in Australia, Arena Corinthians in Brazil, Croke Park in Ireland, Olympiastadion in Germany, and the Bernabéu in Spain. In addition, Tom Benson Hall of Fame Stadium in Canton, Ohio, hosts the annual exhibition Pro Football Hall of Fame Game.

The majority of NFL stadiums use naming rights. Only three — Arrowhead Stadium, Lambeau Field, and Soldier Field — do not currently use a corporate-sponsored name. Though from 2021 to 2026 the Chiefs sold naming rights of the football field to GEHA, the team retained stadium branding under the Arrowhead name before reverting back to Arrowhead Stadium.

== Characteristics ==
Stadiums represent a considerable expense to a community, and thus their construction, use, and funding often enter the public discourse. Also, given the perceived advantage a team gets to playing in its home stadium, particular attention is given in the media to the peculiarities of each stadium's environment. Climate, playing surface (either natural or artificial turf), and the type of roof all contribute to giving each team its home-field advantage.

Stadiums are either open, enclosed, or have a retractable roof. For retractable roofs, the home team determines if the roof is to be opened or closed 90 minutes before kickoff. The roof remains open unless precipitation or lightning is within the vicinity of the stadium, the temperature drops below 40 °F (4 °C), or wind gusts are greater than 40 miles per hour (64 km/h), in which case the roof operators will close the roof.

=== Seating ===
With a peak capacity of over 100,000 spectators (80,000+ listed seating capacity), AT&T Stadium has the highest capacity of any NFL stadium, while MetLife Stadium has the highest listed seating capacity at 82,500. The smallest stadium is Highmark Stadium with a capacity of 60,108.

In their normal configurations, all of the league's 30 stadiums have a seating capacity of at least 60,000 spectators; of those, a majority (17) have fewer than 70,000 seats, while 8 have between 70,000 and 80,000, and 5 can seat 80,000 or more. In contrast to college football stadiums, the largest of which can and regularly do accommodate over 100,000 spectators, no stadium in the league currently has a listed seating capacity of more than 82,500. Teams rarely build their stadiums far beyond the 80,000 seat threshold (and even then, only in the largest markets) because of the league's blackout policy, which prohibited the televising of any NFL game within 75 miles of its home market if a game does not sell all of its non-premium seating. The policy has been suspended since 2015; from then until 2019, several teams played in temporary facilities with capacities far larger than a normal stadium. In 2020, social distancing mandates related to the COVID-19 pandemic prohibited teams from selling out their stadiums, and several teams had no fans in attendance all season due to state mandates (for example, the Las Vegas Raiders had no spectators for the entire season in accordance with Nevada policy). The league has a firm minimum on the number of seats an NFL stadium should have; since 1971, the league has generally not allowed any stadium under 50,000 seats to host a full-time NFL team. In normal circumstances, all NFL stadiums are all-seaters.

== List ==
=== Current ===
Current NFL stadiums
Image	Name	Team(s)	Location	Capacity	Surface	Roof	Opened	Ref.
	Acrisure Stadium	Pittsburgh Steelers	Pittsburgh, Pennsylvania	68,984	Bermuda Grass	Open-air	2001	
	Allegiant Stadium	Las Vegas Raiders	Paradise, Nevada	66,000	Bermuda grass	Skylight	2020	
	Arrowhead Stadium	Kansas City Chiefs	Kansas City, Missouri	73,426	Bermuda grass	Open-air	1972	
	AT&T Stadium	Dallas Cowboys	Arlington, Texas	80,000	Artificial	Retractable	2009	
	Bank of America Stadium	Carolina Panthers	Charlotte, North Carolina	75,037	FieldTurf	Open-air	1996	
	Caesars Superdome	New Orleans Saints	New Orleans, Louisiana	73,208	Artificial	Dome	1975	
	Empower Field at Mile High	Denver Broncos	Denver, Colorado	76,125	Kentucky bluegrass	Open-air	2001	
	EverBank Stadium	Jacksonville Jaguars	Jacksonville, Florida	69,132	Bermuda grass	Open-air	1995	
	Ford Field	Detroit Lions	Detroit, Michigan	65,000	FieldTurf	Dome	2002	
	Gillette Stadium	New England Patriots	Foxborough, Massachusetts	66,829	FieldTurf	Open-air	2002	
	Hard Rock Stadium	Miami Dolphins	Miami Gardens, Florida	65,326	Bermuda grass	Open-air	1987	
	Highmark Stadium	Buffalo Bills	Orchard Park, New York	60,108	Kentucky bluegrass	Open-air	2026	
	Huntington Bank Field	Cleveland Browns	Cleveland, Ohio	67,895	Kentucky bluegrass	Open-air	1999	
	Lambeau Field	Green Bay Packers	Green Bay, Wisconsin	81,441	Hybrid grass	Open-air	1957	
	Levi's Stadium	San Francisco 49ers	Santa Clara, California	68,500	Bermuda grass	Open-air	2014	
	Lincoln Financial Field	Philadelphia Eagles	Philadelphia, Pennsylvania	69,596	GrassMaster	Open-air	2003	
	Lucas Oil Stadium	Indianapolis Colts	Indianapolis, Indiana	67,000	Artificial	Retractable	2008	
	Lumen Field	Seattle Seahawks	Seattle, Washington	69,000	FieldTurf	Open-air	2002	
	M&T Bank Stadium	Baltimore Ravens	Baltimore, Maryland	71,008	Bermuda–ryegrass	Open-air	1998	
	Mercedes-Benz Stadium	Atlanta Falcons	Atlanta, Georgia	71,000	FieldTurf	Retractable	2017	
	MetLife Stadium	New York Giants; New York Jets	East Rutherford, New Jersey	82,500	FieldTurf	Open-air	2010	
	Nissan Stadium	Tennessee Titans	Nashville, Tennessee	69,143	Artificial	Open-air	1999	
	Northwest Stadium	Washington Commanders	Landover, Maryland	64,000	Bermuda grass	Open-air	1997	
	Paycor Stadium	Cincinnati Bengals	Cincinnati, Ohio	65,515	Artificial	Open-air	2000	
	Raymond James Stadium	Tampa Bay Buccaneers	Tampa, Florida	65,890	Bermuda grass	Open-air	1998	
	Reliant Stadium	Houston Texans	Houston, Texas	72,220	Artificial	Retractable	2002	
	SoFi Stadium	Los Angeles Chargers; Los Angeles Rams	Inglewood, California	70,000	Artificial	Skylight	2020	
	Soldier Field	Chicago Bears	Chicago, Illinois	62,500	Bermuda grass	Open-air	1924 (Note: Soldier Field opened in 1924; The Bears became tenants in 1971; The playing field and seating bowl were renovated in 2003, leaving little more than its iconic colonnade.)	
	State Farm Stadium	Arizona Cardinals	Glendale, Arizona	63,400	Bermuda grass	Retractable	2006	
	U.S. Bank Stadium	Minnesota Vikings	Minneapolis, Minnesota	66,655	Artificial	Skylight	2016	

=== Future ===
Under construction
Stadium	Team	Location	Capacity	Surface	Roof	Opening	Ref.
Nissan Stadium	Tennessee Titans	Nashville, Tennessee	60,000	Artificial	Skylight	2027	
New Huntington Bank Field	Cleveland Browns	Brook Park, Ohio	67,500	TBD	Skylight	2029	

Proposed
Stadium	Team	Location	Capacity	Surface	Roof	Opening	Ref.
New Stadium at RFK Campus	Washington Commanders	Washington, D.C.	65,000	TBD	Skylight	2030	
Chicago Bears Stadium	Chicago Bears	TBD	TBD	TBD	Skylight	2031	
New Broncos Stadium	Denver Broncos	Denver, Colorado	TBD	Grass	Retractable	2031	
New Chiefs Stadium	Kansas City Chiefs	Kansas City, Kansas	65,000	TBD	Skylight	2031	

=== Special events ===
NFL International Series
Image	Stadium	Location	Capacity	Surface	Roof	Opened	Ref.
	Allianz Arena	Munich, Germany	75,024	Grass	Open-air	2005	
	Arena Corinthians	São Paulo, Brazil	48,234	Grass	Open-air	2014	
	Bernabéu	Madrid, Spain	81,044	Hybrid grass	Retractable	1947 (Note: Renovated in 1953–1954, 1982, 1992–1994, 2001–2006, 2019–2024.)	
	Croke Park	Dublin, Ireland	82,300	Grass	Open-air	1884 (Note: Renovated in 1917, 1924, 1937, 1949, 1952, 1959, 1988, 1993–1996, 2003, and 2005.)	
	Deutsche Bank Park	Frankfurt, Germany	51,500	Grass	Retractable	1925 (Note: Renovated in 1937, 1953–1955, 1960, 1974, 2002–2005.)	
	Estadio Azteca	Mexico City, Mexico	87,523	Grass	Open-air	1966 (Note: Renovated in 1986, 1999, 2013, 2016, 2024–2026)	
	Maracanã Stadium	Rio de Janeiro, Brazil	73,609	Grass	Open-air	1950 (Note: Renovated in 1999–2000, 2005–2007, 2010–2013)	
	Melbourne Cricket Ground	Melbourne, Australia	100,024	Grass	Open-air	1853 (Note: Renovated in 1861, 1876, 1881, 1884, 1897, 1900, 1904, 1906, 1912, 1927, 1937, 1956, 1967–1968, 1984, 1992, 1994, 2003–2005, and 2011–2013.)	
	Olympiastadion	Berlin, Germany	74,475	Grass	Open-air	1936 (Note: Renovated in 1972–1973, 2000–2004)	
	Stade de France	Saint-Denis, France	81,338	Grass	Open-air	1998 (Note: Renovated in 2006)	
	Tottenham Hotspur Stadium	London, United Kingdom	62,850	Artificial	Open-air	2019	
	Twickenham Stadium	London, United Kingdom	82,223	GrassMaster	Open-air	1909 (Note: Renovated in 1921, 1927, 1932, 1981, 1990, 1995, 2006, 2014.)	
	Wembley Stadium	London, United Kingdom	90,000 (Note: Wembley Stadium seating reduced from 90,000 for NFL games)	GrassMaster	Retractable	2007	

Pro Football Hall of Fame Game
Image	Stadium	Location	Capacity	Surface	Roof	Opened	Ref.
	Tom Benson Hall of Fame Stadium	Canton, Ohio	23,000	FieldTurf	Open-air	1938 (Note: Opened as Fawcett Stadium in 1938; rebuilt in 2015–2016)	

== See also ==
- Lists of stadiums
- List of former NFL stadiums
- Chronology of home stadiums for current NFL teams
- Super Bowl host stadiums
- List of American football stadiums by capacity
