= List of most expensive stadiums =

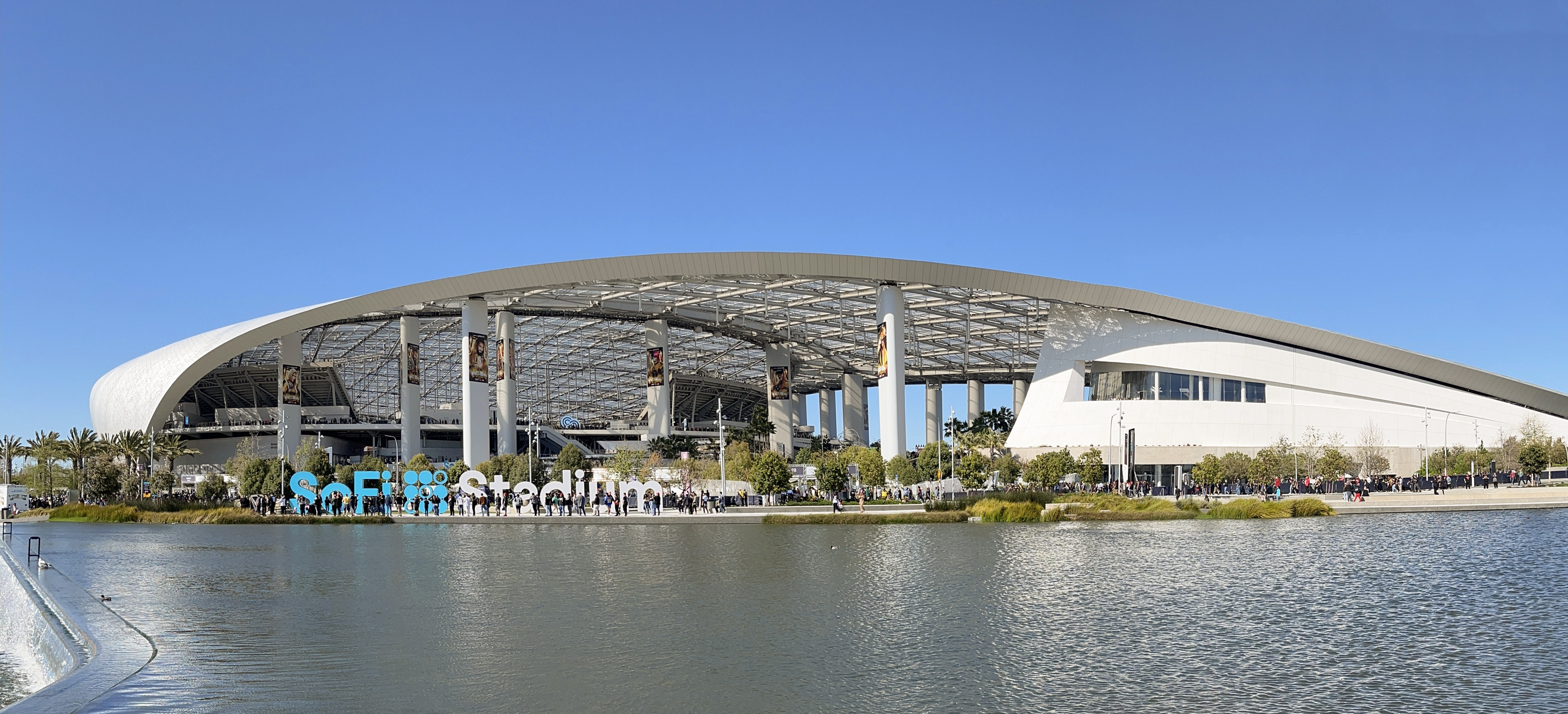
SoFi Stadium, the most expensive stadium ever built at US$5.5 billion

The following is a list of the most expensive stadiums in the world, with a construction cost of at least US$1 billion.

List of most expensive stadiums to construct
Rank	Stadium	Construction cost (billion US$)	Location	Main tenant(s)	Sport	Owner(s)	Capacity	Opened	Inflation-adjusted cost in 2025
1	SoFi Stadium	$5.5 billion	Inglewood, California, U.S.	Los Angeles Rams	American football	Kroenke Sports & Entertainment	70,240	2020	$6.84 billion
1	SoFi Stadium	$5.5 billion	Inglewood, California, U.S.	Los Angeles Chargers	American football	Kroenke Sports & Entertainment	70,240	2020	$6.84 billion
2	New Stadium at RFK Campus	$3.8 billion	Washington, D.C., U.S.	Washington Commanders	American football	Government of DC	65,000	2030 (planned)	N/A
3	New Chiefs Stadium	$3.0 billion	Kansas City, Kansas, U.S.	Kansas City Chiefs	American football	Government of Kansas	65,000	2031 (planned)	N/A
4	New Huntington Bank Field	$2.4 billion	Brook Park, Ohio, U.S.	Cleveland Browns	American football	Jimmy Haslam	67,500	2029 (planned)	N/A
5	Yankee Stadium	$2.3 billion	The Bronx, New York City, U.S.	New York Yankees	Baseball	Government of New York City	54,251	2009	$3.45 billion
5	Yankee Stadium	$2.3 billion	The Bronx, New York City, U.S.	New York City FC	Association football	Government of New York City	54,251	2009	$3.45 billion
6	Highmark Stadium	$2.2 billion	Orchard Park, New York, U.S.	Buffalo Bills	American football	New York State	63,000	2026	N/A
7	Nissan Stadium	$2.1 billion	Nashville, Tennessee, U.S.	Tennessee Titans	American football	Government of Nashville			
8	Allegiant Stadium	$1.9 billion	Paradise, Nevada, U.S.	Las Vegas Raiders	American football	Las Vegas Stadium Authority	65,000	2020	$2.36 billion
8	Allegiant Stadium	$1.9 billion	Paradise, Nevada, U.S.	UNLV Rebels	American football	Las Vegas Stadium Authority	65,000	2020	$2.36 billion
9	MetLife Stadium	$1.7 billion	East Rutherford, New Jersey, U.S.	New York Jets	American football	New York Jets (50%); New York Giants (50%)	82,500	2010	$2.51 billion
9	MetLife Stadium	$1.7 billion	East Rutherford, New Jersey, U.S.	New York Giants	American football	New York Jets (50%); New York Giants (50%)	82,500	2010	$2.51 billion
10	Mercedes-Benz Stadium	$1.5 billion	Atlanta, Georgia, U.S.	Atlanta Falcons	American football	Georgia World Congress Center	75,000	2017	$1.97 billion
10	Mercedes-Benz Stadium	$1.5 billion	Atlanta, Georgia, U.S.	Atlanta United	Association football	Georgia World Congress Center	75,000	2017	$1.97 billion
11	Wembley Stadium	$1.5 billion (£1.1 billion)	London, England	England national football team	Association football	The FA	90,000	2007	$2.33 billion
11	Wembley Stadium	$1.5 billion (£1.1 billion)	London, England	England women's national football team	Association football	The FA	90,000	2007	$2.33 billion
12	AT&T Stadium	$1.48 billion	Arlington, Texas, U.S.	Dallas Cowboys	American football	City of Arlington	80,000	2009	$2.22 billion
13	Tottenham Hotspur Stadium	$1.33 billion (£1 billion)	London, England	Tottenham Hotspur	Association football	Tottenham Hotspur	62,850	2019	$1.67 billion
14	Singapore National Stadium	$1.31 billion (S$1.87 billion)	Kallang, Singapore	Singapore national football team	Association football	Sport Singapore	55,000	2014	$1.78 billion
15	Levi's Stadium	$1.3 billion	Santa Clara, California, U.S.	San Francisco 49ers	American football	City of Santa Clara	68,500	2014	$1.8 billion
16	Optus Stadium	$1.2 billion	Perth, Australia	Australia national cricket team	Cricket	Government of Western Australia	61,244	2017	$1.58 billion
16	Optus Stadium	$1.2 billion	Perth, Australia	Western Australia cricket team	Cricket	Government of Western Australia	61,244	2017	$1.58 billion
16	Optus Stadium	$1.2 billion	Perth, Australia	Perth Scorchers	Cricket	Government of Western Australia	61,244	2017	$1.58 billion
16	Optus Stadium	$1.2 billion	Perth, Australia	Perth Scorchers Women	Cricket	Government of Western Australia	61,244	2017	$1.58 billion
16	Optus Stadium	$1.2 billion	Perth, Australia	West Coast Eagles	Australian rules football	Government of Western Australia	61,244	2017	$1.58 billion
16	Optus Stadium	$1.2 billion	Perth, Australia	Fremantle Dockers	Australian rules football	Government of Western Australia	61,244	2017	$1.58 billion
17	Olympic Stadium	$1.1 billion	Montréal, Canada	CF Montréal	Association football	Government of Quebec	61,004	1976	$8.95 billion
18	Krestovsky Stadium	$1.1 billion	Saint Petersburg, Russia	Zenit	Association football	Zenit	68,000	2017	$1.44 billion
19	U.S. Bank Stadium	$1.1 billion	Minneapolis, Minnesota, U.S.	Minnesota Vikings	American football	Minnesota Sports Facilities Authority	73,000	2016	$1.48 billion
20	Globe Life Field	$1.1 billion	Arlington, Texas, U.S.	Texas Rangers	Baseball	City of Arlington	40,300	2020	$1.37 billion

== See also ==
- List of most expensive buildings
