= Commanders Stadium =

Commanders Stadium may refer to:

- Northwest Stadium, home venue of the NFL's Washington Commanders in Landover, Maryland
- New Stadium at RFK Campus, a future stadium in Washington, D.C.
