= 2031 FIFA Women's World Cup =

Copa Mundial Femenina de la FIFA 2031

Tournament details
- Host countries: Costa Rica; Jamaica; Mexico; United States
- Dates: 2031
- Teams: 48 (from 6 (Note: UEFA initially announced a boycott of FIFA competitions over the FIFA Forward Enterprise proposal, but provisionally suspended that boycott after FIFA assured in writing that no such proposal would be considered in the future. The UEFA Executive Committee will monitor events and reinstate the boycott if deemed necessary.) confederations)

The 2031 FIFA Women's World Cup is scheduled to be the 11th edition of the FIFA Women's World Cup, the quadrennial international women's soccer championship contested by the national teams that represent the member associations of FIFA. The tournament will be the first to involve 48 national teams.

The tournament hosts will be Mexico, the United States, Costa Rica, and Jamaica.

== Host selection ==
The host nation(s) for the 2031 Women's World Cup will be formally decided by the tenth extraordinary FIFA Congress on November 23, 2026, in Zürich, two years after the host selection for the 2027 edition. On March 5, 2025, the FIFA Council approved the bid regulations, which restricted bids to CONCACAF and CAF members. The key dates include:

- March 31, 2025: Member associations to submit their expressions of interest to host the 2031 and 2035 Women's World Cup
- April 30, 2025: Member associations to confirm their interest in bidding to host the Women's World Cup by submitting the bidding agreement
- Q2 2025: Bid workshop and observer program to take place
- November 28, 2025: Member associations to submit their bids to FIFA
- February 2026: FIFA to organize on-site inspection visits to bidding countries
- November 11, 2026: Publication of FIFA's bid evaluation report
- November 23, 2026: Appointment of the 2031 and 2035 Women's World Cup hosts at the tenth extraordinary FIFA Congress in Zürich, Switzerland

On April 3, 2025, FIFA announced that the United States bid was the only valid bid, with other CONCACAF nations eligible to host games. The United States bid had been announced alongside Mexico and had explored a limited number of games in Costa Rica and Jamaica. Mexico later joined the United States as hosts on May 27, 2025. Costa Rica and Jamaica also joined as hosts on October 20, 2025.

It will be the third Women's World Cup hosted by the United States, after 1999 and 2003. This will be the first time Mexico will host the FIFA Women's World Cup, which will make it the seventh country—after Sweden, the United States, Germany, France, Canada, and Brazil—to host both the men's and women's World Cups, having hosted the former in 1970, 1986, and 2026. This will be the first senior FIFA World Cup to take place in Costa Rica and Jamaica, and the first in Central America and the Caribbean. Costa Rica will become the first country to host all three FIFA Women's World Cups, having hosted the U-17 World Cup in 2014 and the U-20 World Cup in 2022. It will mark the first time Jamaica has hosted a FIFA tournament. This will also be the first Women's World Cup to be hosted in more than two countries.

== Format ==
The expansion of the Women's World Cup from 32 to 48 teams comes with the success of the 2023 FIFA Women's World Cup, where the number of participants was increased from 24 to 32 teams. The rapid growth of women's soccer in the 2020s led to the potential expansion following suit with the men's World Cup. During the March 5, 2025, FIFA Council meeting, FIFA president Gianni Infantino stated that the tournament would possibly be expanded to 48 teams depending on decisions made in the lead-up to the host selection. On April 3, 2025, the tournament was expanded to 48 teams starting from the 2031 FIFA Women's World Cup, a decision confirmed one month later on May 9, 2025.

The teams will be split into 12 groups of 4 teams, with the top two of each group and the eight best third-placed teams progressing to a new round of 32. The total number of games played will increase from 64 to 104, and the maximum number of games played by teams reaching the final will increase from seven to eight.

== Venues ==
In its hosting requirements document, FIFA stipulated that the 32-team competition will have a minimum of eight stadiums, of which at least five were to be existing venues. The stadiums would have minimum seating capacities of 20,000 for most matches, 40,000 for the semifinals, and 65,000 for the opener and final. However, additional changes will be made to accommodate the expansion to 48.

In Costa Rica, the only city interested is San José.

In Jamaica, the only city interested is Kingston.

In Mexico, several cities are interested: Guadalajara, Mexico City, Monterrey, Pachuca, Querétaro, and Torreón.

In the United States, more than 30 regions featuring existing stadiums have shown interest, including Atlanta, Baltimore, Birmingham, Boston, Charlotte, Chicago, Cincinnati, Cleveland, Columbus, Dallas–Fort Worth, Denver, Houston, Indianapolis, Kansas City, Los Angeles, Miami, Minneapolis, Nashville, New York/New Jersey, Orlando, Philadelphia, Phoenix, Portland, Salt Lake City, San Diego, the San Francisco Bay Area, Seattle, St. Louis, the Tampa Bay Area, and Washington, D.C., with bidding set to begin in the coming years.Additionally, the New Stadium at RFK Campus in Washington, D.C., is planned to be completed in 2030 as to be eligible as a host venue.

On November 28, 2025, the bid book listed 20 possible stadiums the bidding committee had in mind with additional stadiums mentioned as well. No official statement has been made yet on when the host city selection process will begin. A bid evaluation report was released by FIFA in September 2026 and shortlisted four stadiums to consider for the final match.

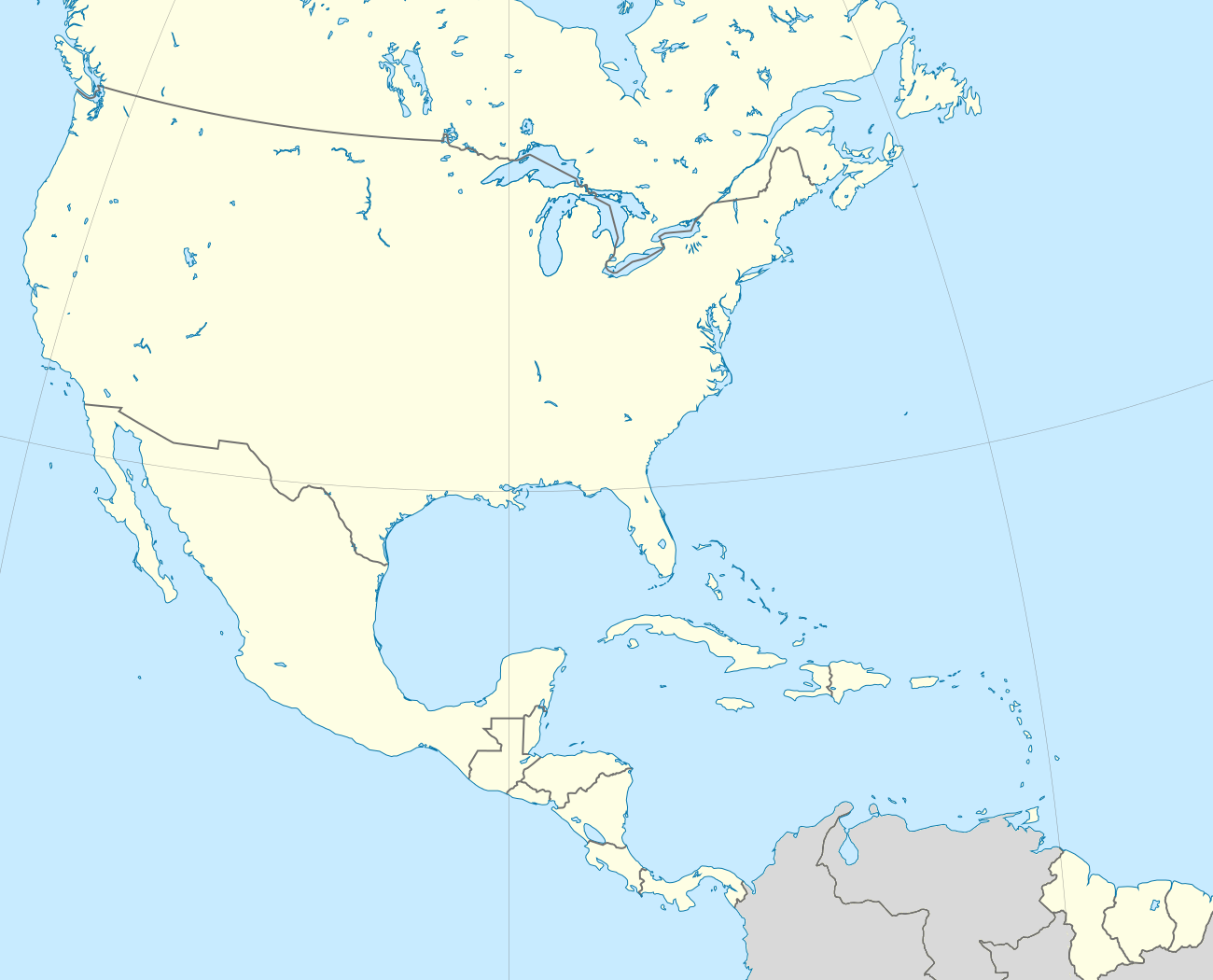
Shortlisted locations

A † denotes a stadium used for previous Women's World Cup tournaments.
A ‡ denotes an indoor stadium with a fixed or retractable roof with interior climate control.

List of proposed host cities and sample stadiums
| Country | City | Stadium | Capacity | Image |
|---|---|---|---|---|
| United States | New York/New Jersey (East Rutherford, New Jersey) | MetLife Stadium | 82,500 | |
| United States | Dallas (Arlington, Texas) | AT&T Stadium‡ | 80,000 (expandable to 105,000) | |
| United States | Kansas City | Arrowhead Stadium | 76,416 | |
| United States | Denver | Empower Field at Mile High | 76,125 | |
| United States | Charlotte | Bank of America Stadium | 75,037 | |
| United States | Houston | Reliant Stadium‡ | 72,220 (expandable to 80,000) | |
| United States | Atlanta | Mercedes-Benz Stadium‡ | 71,000 (expandable to 83,000) | |
| United States | Los Angeles (Inglewood, California) | SoFi Stadium | 70,240 (expandable to 100,240) | |
| United States | Seattle | Lumen Field | 68,740 (expandable to 72,000) | |
| United States | Minneapolis | U.S. Bank Stadium‡ | 66,202 (expandable to 73,000) | |
| United States | Washington, D.C. | New Stadium at RFK Campus‡ | 65,000 | |
| United States | Chicago | Soldier Field | 62,500 | |
| United States | Orlando | Camping World Stadium | 60,219 (expandable to 65,194) | |
| United States | San Diego | Snapdragon Stadium | 35,000 (expandable to 55,000) | |
| United States | Nashville | Geodis Park | 30,109 | |
| United States | Portland | Providence Park | 24,686 | |
| Mexico | Mexico City | Estadio Banorte | 87,523 | |
| Mexico | Monterrey (Guadalupe) | Estadio BBVA | 53,500 (bid book: 53,460) | |
| Mexico | Guadalajara (Zapopan) | Estadio Akron | 49,813 (bid book: 48,071) | |
| Mexico | Torreón | Estadio Corona | 29,101 | |
| Costa Rica | San José | Costa Rica National Stadium | 35,000 | |
| Jamaica | Kingston | Independence Park | 37,500 (after renovation) | |

List of backup host cities and sample stadiums
| Country | City | Stadium | Capacity | Image |
|---|---|---|---|---|
| United States | Los Angeles | Los Angeles Memorial Coliseum | 77,500 | |
| United States | Los Angeles (Pasadena, California) | Rose Bowl† | 72,000 (after renovation) | |
| United States | Baltimore | M&T Bank Stadium | 70,745 | |
| United States | Tampa Bay (Tampa, Florida) | Raymond James Stadium | 69,218 (expandable to 75,000) | |
| United States | San Francisco Bay Area (Santa Clara, California) | Levi's Stadium | 68,500 (bid book: 70,909) (expandable to 75,000) | |
| United States | Philadelphia | Lincoln Financial Field† | 67,594 (bid book: 69,328) | |
| United States | Cleveland (Brook Park, Ohio) | New Huntington Bank Field‡ | 67,000 | |
| United States | Boston (Foxborough, Massachusetts) | Gillette Stadium† | 64,628 (bid book: 70,000) | Gillette Stadium |
| United States | Phoenix (Glendale, Arizona) | State Farm Stadium | 63,400 (expandable to 72,200) | |
| United States | Nashville | Nissan Stadium‡ | 60,000 | |
| United States | Birmingham | Protective Stadium | 47,100 | |
| United States | San Francisco Bay Area (San Francisco) | Oracle Park | 42,000 | |
| United States | Los Angeles (Carson, California) | Dignity Health Sports Park† | 27,000 | |
| United States | Cincinnati | TQL Stadium | 26,000 | |
| United States | Orlando | Inter.co Stadium | 25,500 | |
| United States | New York/New Jersey (New York City) | Etihad Park | 25,000 | |
| United States | New York/New Jersey (Harrison, New Jersey) | Sports Illustrated Stadium | 25,000 | |
| United States | Dallas (Frisco, Texas) | Toyota Stadium | 22,500 (after renovation) | |
| United States | St. Louis | Energizer Park | 22,423 | |
| United States | Chicago | McDonald's Park | 22,000 | |
| United States | Miami (Fort Lauderdale, Florida) | Inter Miami CF Stadium | 21,550 | |
| United States | Houston | Shell Energy Stadium | 20,656 | |
| United States | Salt Lake City (Sandy, Utah) | America First Field | 20,213 | |
| United States | Columbus | ScottsMiracle-Gro Field | 20,371 | |
| United States | Indianapolis | Eleven Park | 20,000 | |
| United States | Washington, D.C. | Audi Field | 20,000 | |
| United States | Kansas City | CPKC Stadium | 11,500 (to be expanded to 18,000) | |
| Mexico | Monterrey (San Nicolás de los Garza) | Estadio Universitario | 41,886 | |
| Mexico | Querétaro | Estadio Corregidora | 34,130 | |
| Mexico | Pachuca | Estadio Hidalgo | 25,922 | |
| Costa Rica | San José | Estadio Ricardo Saprissa Aymá | 23,112 | |

== Teams ==
=== Qualification ===
FIFA's confederations organize their own qualifying competitions, with the exception of CAF and CONCACAF, which qualify teams through continental championships. The hosts Costa Rica, Jamaica, Mexico, and the United States qualified automatically for the tournament, leaving most of the remaining FIFA member associations eligible to enter qualification if they chose to do so.

- AFC (Asia): TBD
- CAF (Africa): TBD
- CONCACAF (North America, Central America and the Caribbean): TBD (including co-hosts Costa Rica, Jamaica, Mexico, and the United States)
- CONMEBOL (South America): TBD
- OFC (Oceania): TBD
- UEFA (Europe): TBD

=== Qualified teams ===
| Team | Qualified as | Qualification date | Appearance in finals | Last appearance | Consecutive streak | Previous best performance |
|---|---|---|---|---|---|---|
| United States | Co-hosts | April 3, 2025 (Note: On April 3, 2025, FIFA announced that the United States bid was the only valid bid. However, the formal announcement of the host(s) will be made on November 23, 2026.) | 10th/11th | 2023/2027 | 1/11 | Champions (1991, 1999, 2015, 2019) |
| Mexico | Co-hosts | May 27, 2025 (Note: It was revealed that Mexico joined the United States as co-hosts on May 27, 2025. However, the formal announcement of the host(s) will be made on November 23, 2026.) | 4th/5th | 2015/2027 | 1/2 | Group stage (1999, 2011, 2015) |
| Costa Rica | Co-hosts | October 20, 2025 (Note: It was revealed that Costa Rica and Jamaica joined the United States and Mexico as co-hosts on October 20, 2025. However, the formal announcement of the host(s) will be made on November 23, 2026.) | 3rd/4th | 2023/2027 | 1/3 | Group stage (2015, 2023) |
| Jamaica | Co-hosts | October 20, 2025 | 3rd/4th | 2023/2027 | 1/4 | Round of 16 (2023) |

== Marketing ==
=== Broadcasting ===
- Canada – Netflix
- China – CCTV
- United States – Netflix

== UEFA boycott ==
On July 30, 2026, following FIFA's announcement of FIFA Forward Enterprise (a proposal to sell stakes in FIFA's tournament operations, including for the FIFA Women's World Cup, to private investors), all 55 UEFA member associations agreed to an indefinite boycott of FIFA competitions until the proposal was shelved and assurances were made that such a proposal would not be re-introduced. A day later, the proposal was scrapped, although UEFA stated that, regardless, it no longer trusts FIFA's governance. UEFA provisionally suspended its boycott on August 26 following written assurances that a similar proposal would not be brought up in the future, though the UEFA Executive Committee will monitor events and reinstate the boycott if deemed necessary.

== See also ==
- 2030 FIFA World Cup
