= RCA Dome =

Stadium in Indianapolis, Indiana, US (1984–2008)

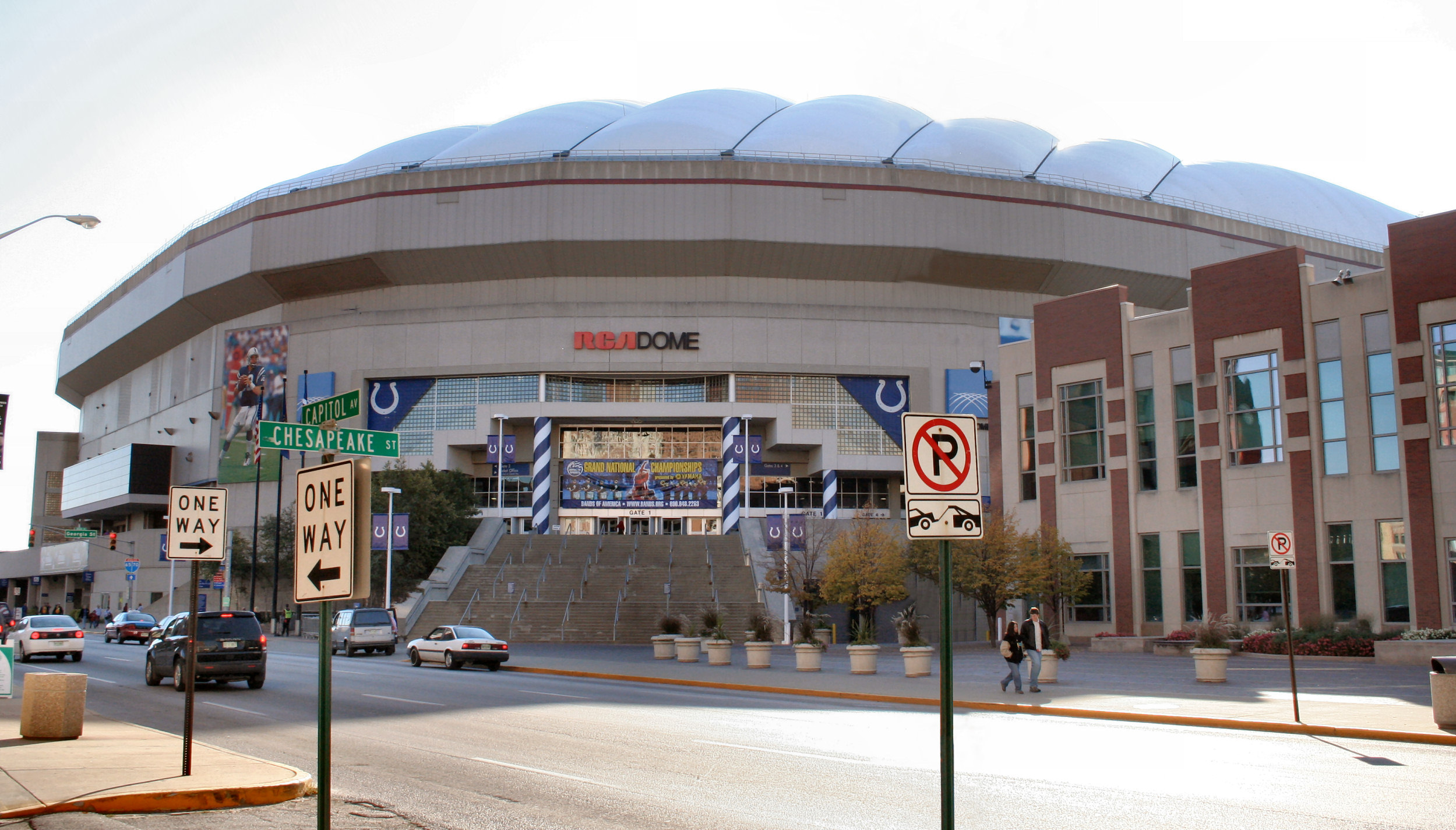
- The Dome in 2005
- Interactive map of RCA Dome
- Former names: Hoosier Dome (1983–1994)
- Address: 100 South Capitol Avenue
- Location: Indianapolis, Indiana
- Coordinates: 39°45′49″N 86°9′48″W
- Owner: Capital Improvement Board
- Operator: Capital Improvement Board
- Capacity: 60,127 (1984–1991); 60,129 (1992–1995); 60,272 (1996–1997); 60,567 (1998); 56,127 (1999–2002); 55,506 (2003–2005); 55,531 (2006–2008)
- Executive suites: 104
- Surface: AstroTurf (1984–2004); FieldTurf (2005–2008)
- Record attendance: WrestleMania VIII: 62,167 (April 5, 1992)

Construction
- Groundbreaking: May 27, 1982; 44 years ago
- Opened: August 5, 1984; 42 years ago
- Closed: February 26, 2008; 18 years ago
- Demolished: December 20, 2008; 17 years ago
- Cost: US$77.5 million ($240 million in 2025 dollars)
- Architects: HNTB; Browning Day Pollack Mullins Inc.
- Structural engineer: Geiger Engineers
- Services engineers: M&E Engineering Service, Inc.
- General contractor: Huber, Hunt & Nichols

Tenant
- Indianapolis Colts (1984–2007)

The RCA Dome (originally Hoosier Dome) was a domed stadium in Indianapolis. It was the home of the Indianapolis Colts NFL franchise for 24 seasons from 1984 to 2007.

It was completed at a cost of $77.5 million, as part of the Indiana Convention Center, with the costs split between private and public money. The largest crowd to attend an event at the Dome was 62,167 for WrestleMania VIII in 1992. It was demolished on December 20, 2008, as part of a project to expand the attached convention center.

== Description ==
The Birdair-designed dome was made up of teflon-coated fiberglass and weighed 257 short tons (229 long tons; 233 t), which was held up by the air pressure inside the building. The ceiling was 193 feet (59 m) high, though the height varied up to 5 feet (1.5 m) as the materials expanded and contracted with the weather.

Like other domes of this style (the Hubert H. Humphrey Metrodome, BC Place, the JMA Wireless Dome, the Pontiac Silverdome and the Tokyo Dome) there were warning signs posted cautioning patrons of the high winds at the doors when exiting the facility.

== History ==
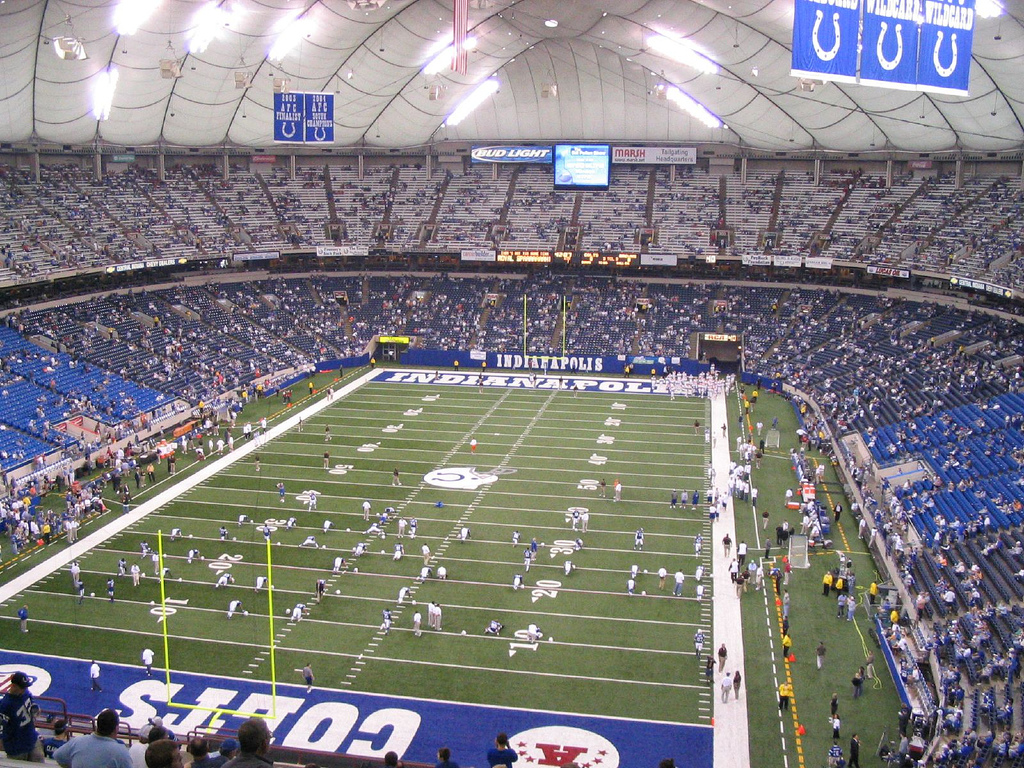
Warm-ups before a game in the RCA Dome

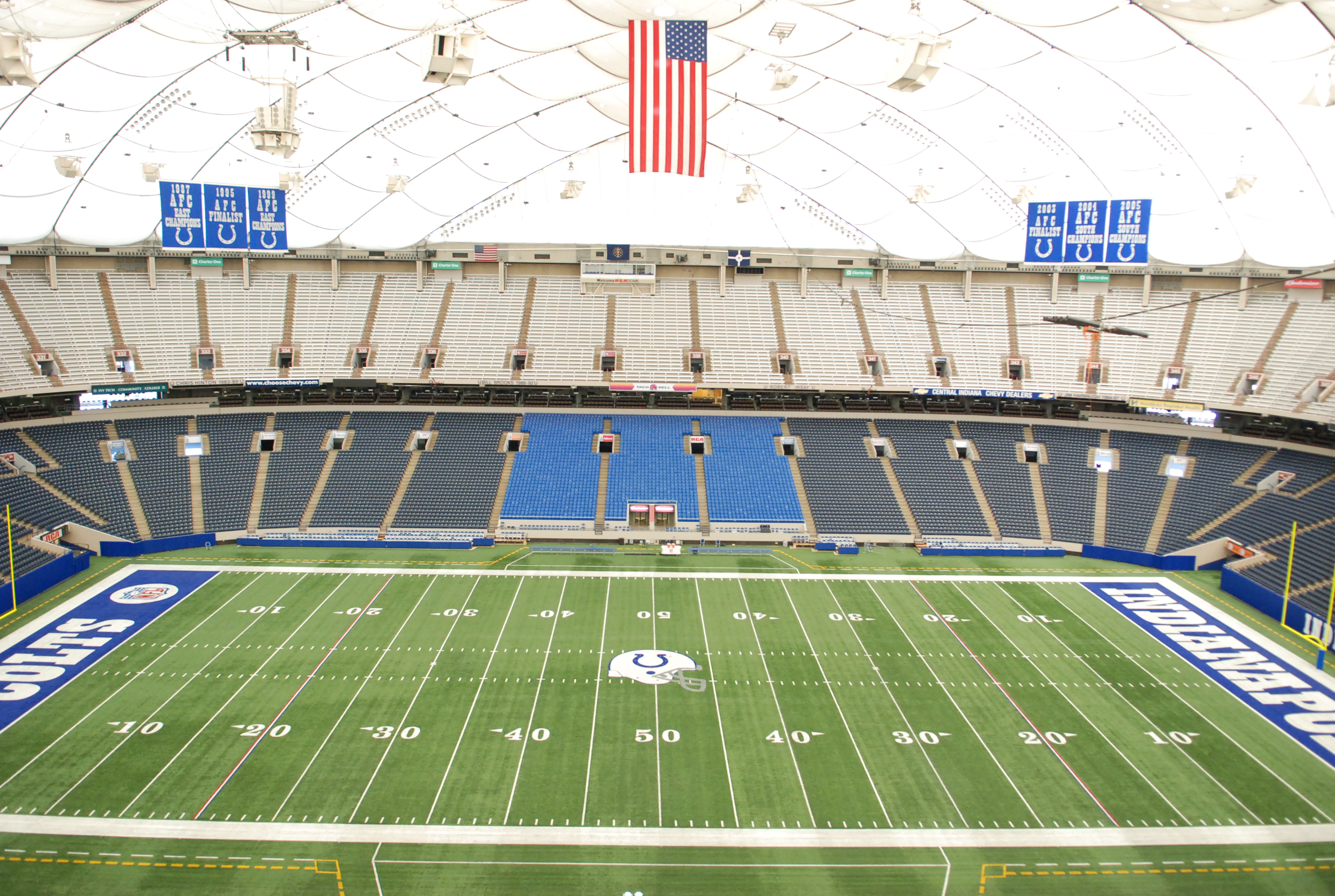
Inside the RCA Dome

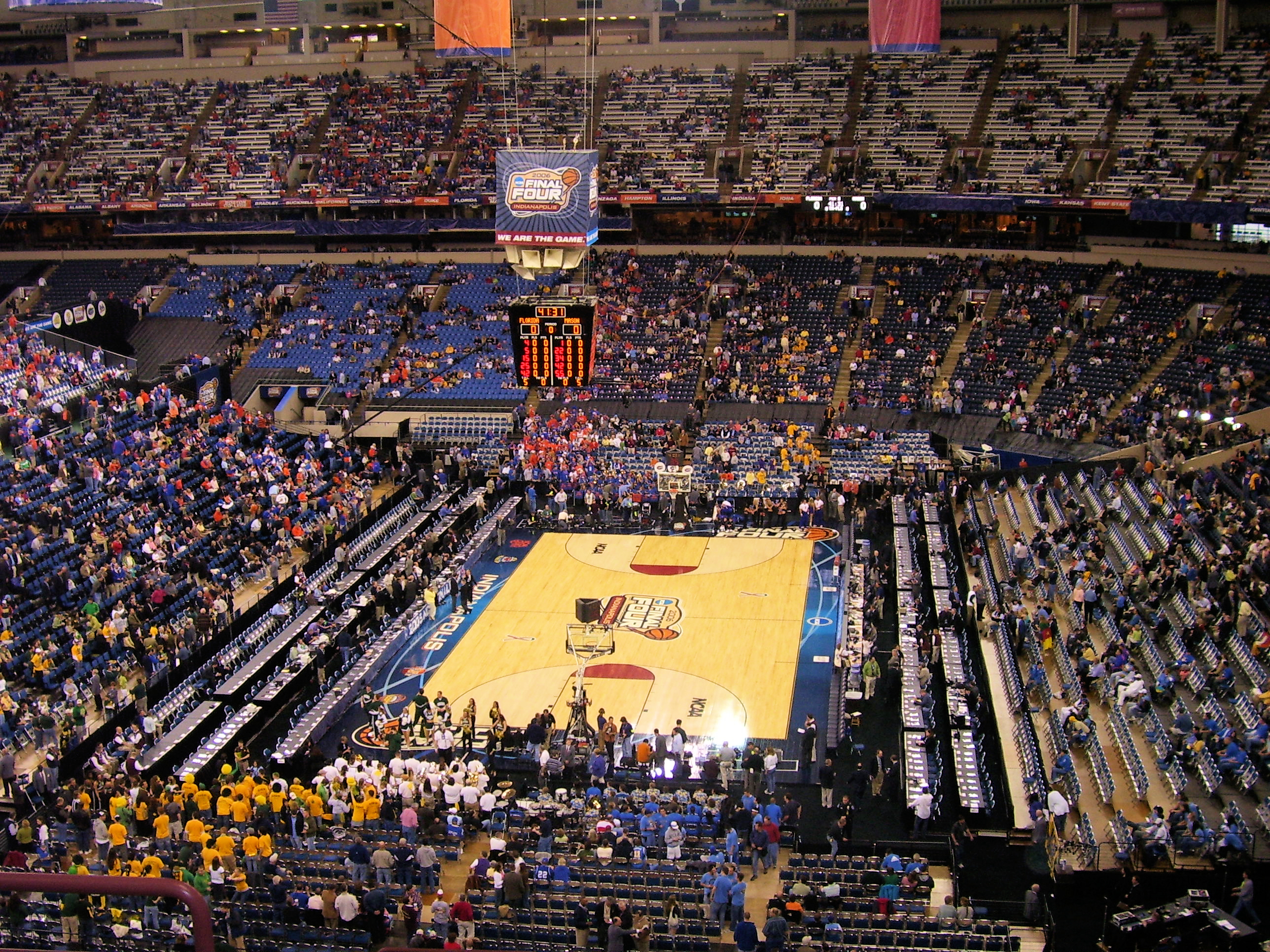
2006 NCAA Final Four

Construction for the Hoosier Dome began in May 1982.

The domed stadium was similar in design and appearance to the Metrodome and the previous BC Place roof, owing in great part to the involvement of engineers David Geiger and Walter Bird, pioneers in air-supported roofs.

The stadium was originally named the Hoosier Dome until 1994 when RCA paid $10 million for the naming rights for 10 years, with two 5-year options to RCA at a cost of $3.5 million if invoked. The stadium seated 56,127 for football, the smallest in the NFL. Modifications were made to the stadium in 1999 to expand the suites and add club seating. Before that, the maximum seating for a football crowd was 60,272. The stadium was built to lure a National Football League team to Indianapolis, and as the stadium was being completed, the Baltimore Colts relocated to Indianapolis on March 29, 1984.

The Dome was officially dedicated on August 11, 1984, as a sellout crowd watched the Indianapolis Colts defeat the New York Giants in an NFL preseason game. The Buffalo Bills and Chicago Bears played a preseason game at the Hoosier Dome on August 26, 1984, which had been scheduled prior to the Colts moving in.

The football playing surface was originally AstroTurf, and replaced with FieldTurf in 2005.

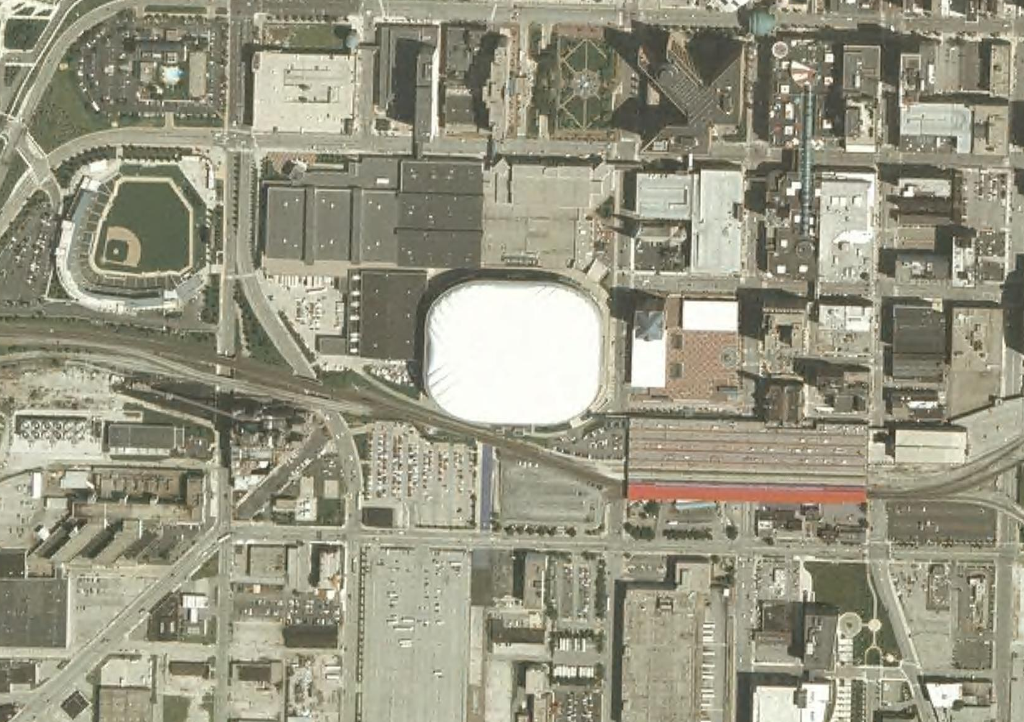
Aerial view of downtown Indianapolis, with the RCA Dome in the center

The Colts moved into the new, retractable-roof, Lucas Oil Stadium for the 2008 NFL season. The RCA Dome was replaced by additional space for the adjacent Indiana Convention Center. The new convention space connects to Lucas Oil Stadium in much the same way that the existing Indiana Convention Center had been connected to the RCA Dome (although the new connecting walkway now passes under a railroad track).

=== Demolition ===
On September 24, 2008, the roof of the Dome was deflated, which took about 35 minutes. The building itself was imploded on December 20, 2008, by Controlled Demolition, Inc., and was featured on the second series premiere of the National Geographic show Blowdown.

An Indianapolis nonprofit, People for Urban Progress, rescued 13 acres (5.3 ha) of the Dome roof. They work with local Indianapolis designers to recycle the material into community shade structures and art installations, as well as wallets, purses and bags.

== Events ==
=== Football ===
Although the RCA Dome never hosted any Super Bowls, it played host to the 2006 AFC Championship Game, which saw the Colts erase a 21–3 deficit for a come-from-behind 38–34 win over the New England Patriots in what would ultimately be the only AFC Championship Game hosted at the RCA Dome.

The RCA Dome also hosted three AFC Divisional Round games in 1999, 2005, and 2007, with the Colts posting an 0–3 record in those games; the 2005 game, which saw the heavily favored Colts lose to the Pittsburgh Steelers 21–18 in one of the biggest upsets in NFL history (en route to the Steelers' victory in Super Bowl XL), is best remembered for Colts cornerback Nick Harper recovering a Jerome Bettis fumble only for Mike Vanderjagt to miss the game-tying field goal at the end of the game. The RCA Dome also hosted three AFC wild card games in 2003, 2004, and 2006, with the Colts winning all three games. The Colts' 28–24 loss to the San Diego Chargers in the 2007 Divisional Round proved to be the stadium's final game before the Colts moved on to Lucas Oil Stadium the following season.

=== Basketball ===
In addition to football, the RCA Dome hosted several basketball games. The first was an exhibition game in 1984 between an NBA All-Star team led by home-state hero Larry Bird and the United States Olympic Men's Basketball team, coached by Bob Knight, who was at the time the coach of Indiana University. The Dome hosted the 1985 NBA All-Star Game in February, where an NBA-record crowd of 43,146 saw the Western Conference beat the host Eastern Conference 140–129. The Indiana High School Athletic Association's 1990 boys and girls basketball finals were held at the stadium; 41,046 attended the boys semifinals and finals, setting the record for the largest crowd at a high school basketball game. Later, it hosted many NCAA Men's Division I Basketball Championship games, including four Final Fours (1991, 1997, 2000, 2006). The NCAA, whose headquarters are in Indianapolis, has committed to holding the Final Four in the city once every five years. The RCA Dome hosted its only Women's Final Four in 2005. It served as one of two sites for the FIBA Men's Basketball World Championship in 2002, sharing the honors with Gainbridge Fieldhouse, the home of the Indiana Pacers.

=== Other sports ===
During the 1987 Pan American Games, the RCA Dome hosted the Gymnastics and Handball competitions as well as the closing ceremonies.

In 1991, the Dome hosted the 1991 World Artistic Gymnastics Championships. In 1992, the Dome hosted WrestleMania VIII for the World Wrestling Federation.

Monster Jam hosted events at the venue every year, with the last event being held in 2008 a few months before the venue was demolished.

In addition, it hosted the NCAA Men's Division I Indoor Track and Field Championships from 1989 to 1999, and the 1990 General Conference Session of Seventh-day Adventists. Additionally, the RCA Dome served as the site of the Indiana State School Music Association State Marching Band Competition, the Bands of America Grand Nationals, and the Drum Corps International Midwestern Regional, along with the NFL Scouting Combine in February of each year. The 2004 U.S. Olympic Team Wrestling Trials were held in the Dome. It also hosted a PBR Built Ford Tough Series bull riding event in 2004.

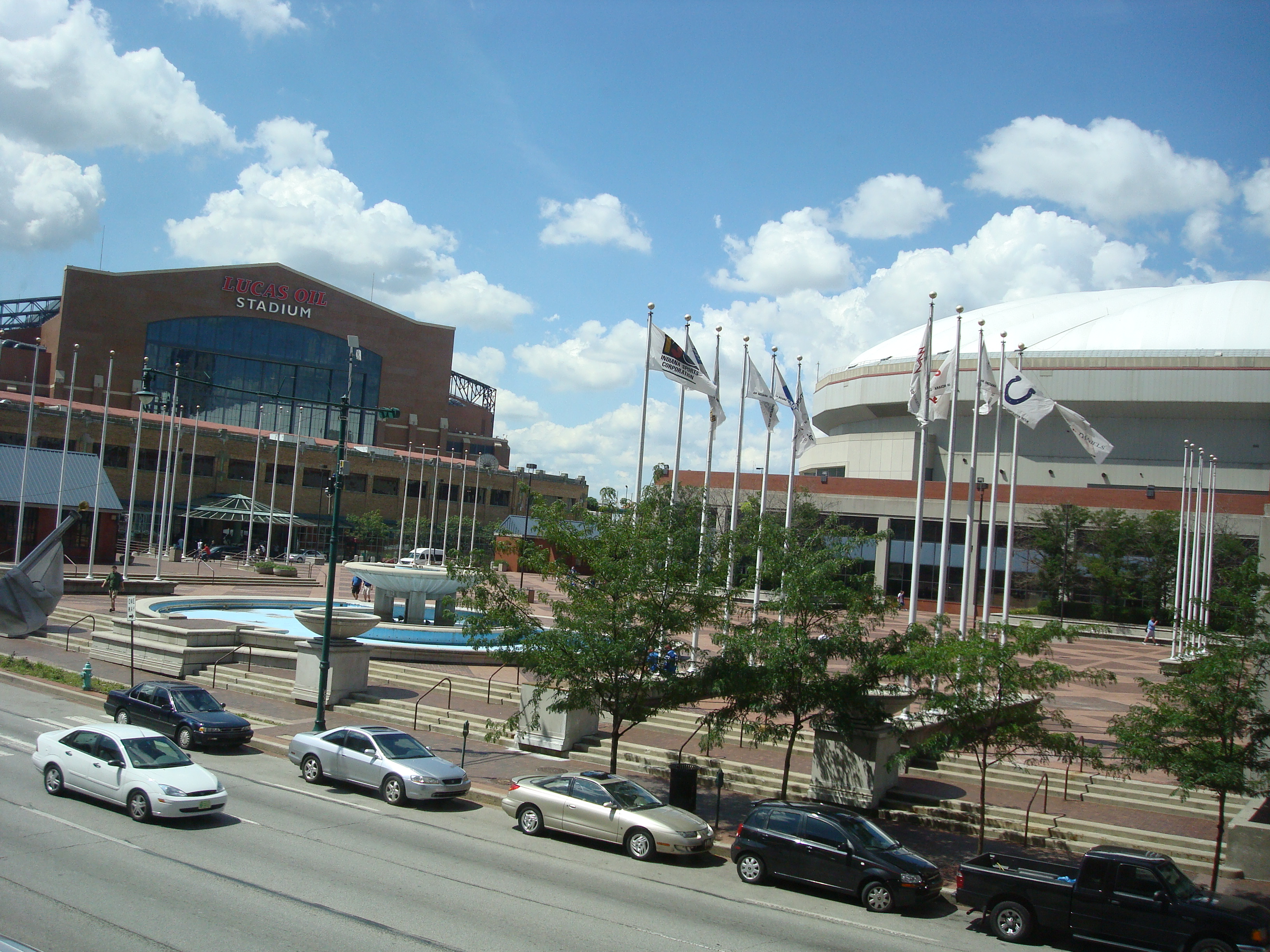
Lucas Oil Stadium (left) replaced the RCA Dome (right) in 2008.

The Thunder in the Dome was a midget car race held from 1985 to 2001. The Dome also hosted an AMA Supercross Championship round from 1992 to 2008.

=== Concerts ===
Many concerts took place in this venue, such as the 1987 Pink Floyd reunion, the Rolling Stones, the Monsters of Rock Festival in 1988 (Van Halen, Metallica, Scorpions, Dokken, and Kingdom Come), and Farm Aid IV in 1990 (Elton John, Guns N' Roses, Lou Reed, John Mellencamp, Genesis, CSNY, Willie Nelson, Iggy Pop, Don Henley & Bonnie Raitt).

== See also ==
- List of former NFL stadiums
- History of the Indianapolis Colts

Events and tenants
Preceded by Memorial Stadium	Home of the Indianapolis Colts; 1984–2008	Succeeded by Lucas Oil Stadium
Preceded by McNichols Sports Arena; Continental Airlines Arena; Tropicana Field; Edward Jones Dome	NCAA Division I men's basketball tournament Finals Venue; 1991; 1997; 2000; 2006	Succeeded by H.H.H. Metrodome; Alamodome; H.H.H. Metrodome; Georgia Dome
Preceded by New Orleans Arena	NCAA Division I women's basketball tournament Finals Venue; 2005	Succeeded by TD Banknorth Garden
Preceded by Gator Bowl; Pontiac Silverdome	Host of Bands of America; Grand National Championship; 1984–1986; 1989–2007	Succeeded by Pontiac Silverdome; Lucas Oil Stadium
Preceded by McNichols Sports Arena	Host of the NBA All-Star Game; 1985	Succeeded by Reunion Arena
Preceded by Palais Omnisports de Paris-Bercy; Paris	IAAF World Indoor Championships in Athletics; Venue; 1987	Succeeded by Budapest Sportcsarnok; Budapest
Preceded by Los Angeles Memorial Sports Arena	Host of WrestleMania VIII; 1992	Succeeded by Caesars Palace
Preceded by Invesco Field at Mile High	Host of AFC Championship Game; 2007	Succeeded by Gillette Stadium
