= List of former NFL stadiums =

This article is a list of former National Football League (NFL) stadiums, their locations, the years of usage, and the teams that played inside the stadiums.

== Early era (1920–1940) ==
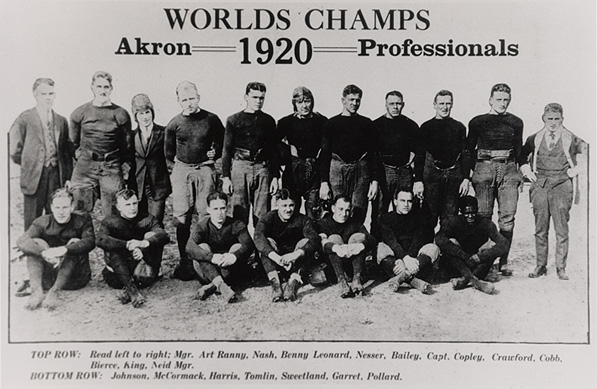
Image of the NFL Champion Akron Pros.

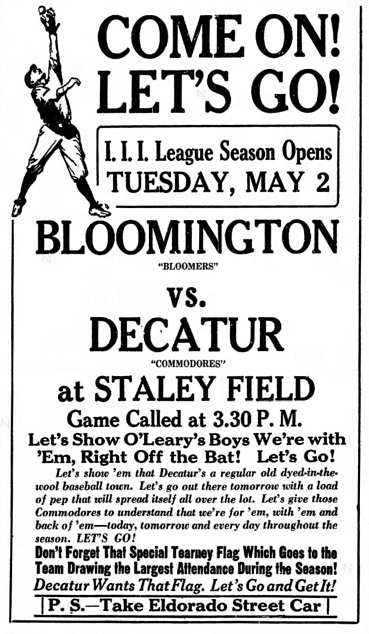
Advertisement for a Decatur Staleys game.

Teams that were not in the NFL while in the stadium or not in the NFL when they left a stadium will not be shown, and if they had the same stadium when they joined the NFL, the joined stadium section will be the year the team joined the NFL.

| Stadium | Team(s) | City | Joined stadium | Left stadium | Notes (if needed) | Reference(s) | Images |
|---|---|---|---|---|---|---|---|
| Akron's League Park | Akron Pros | Akron, Ohio | 1920 | 1922 | Site of the first NFL Champions.; Named Elk's Field for 1922.; Later named League Park after Akron Pros left. | | |
| League Field | Canton Bulldogs | Canton, Ohio | 1920 | 1926 | | | |
| Navin Field/Briggs Stadium/Tiger Stadium | Detroit Heralds, Detroit Panthers, Detroit Wolverines, Detroit Lions | Detroit, Michigan | 1920, 1925, 1928, 1938 | 1921, 1926, 1928, 1974 | | | |
| Staley Field | Decatur Staleys/Bears | Decatur, Illinois | 1920 | 1921 | | | |
| Triangle Park | Dayton Triangles | Dayton, Ohio | 1920 | 1929 | Site of first NFL game. | | |
| Bosse Field | Evansville Crimson Giants | Evansville, Indiana | 1921 | 1922 | | | |
| Hagemeister Park | Green Bay Packers | Green Bay, Wisconsin | 1921 | 1922 | | | |
| Cubs Park/Wrigley Field | Chicago Tigers, Hammond Pros, Chicago Bears, Chicago Cardinals | Chicago, Illinois | 1920, 1920, 1921, 1931 | 1920, 1926, 1970, 1939 | Until 2003, Wrigley Field had hosted more NFL games than any other stadium. | | |
| Comiskey Park | Chicago Cardinals | Chicago, Illinois | 1922 | 1958 | | | |
| Lakeside Park | Canton Bulldogs | Canton, Ohio | 1922 | 1926 | | | |
| Borchert Field | Milwaukee Badgers, Green Bay Packers | Milwaukee, Wisconsin | 1922, 1933 | 1926, 1933 | | | |
| Horlick Athletic Field | Racine Legion/Tornadoes | Racine, Wisconsin | 1922 | 1926 | | | |
| Swayne Field | Toledo Maroons | Toledo, Ohio | 1922 | 1922 | | | |
| Armory Park | Toledo Maroons | Toledo, Ohio | 1923 | 1923 | Team also played in stadium from 1902 to 1908 prior to joining the NFL | | |
| Bellevue Park | Green Bay Packers | Preble, Wisconsin | 1923 | 1924 | Site of first Packers-Bears game | | |
| Frankford Stadium | Frankford Yellow Jackets | Philadelphia, Pennsylvania | 1923 | 1931 | | | |
| Sportsman's Park | St. Louis All-Stars, St. Louis Gunners, St. Louis Cardinals | St. Louis, Missouri | 1923, 1934, 1960 | 1923, 1934, 1965 | Also known as Busch Stadium from 1953 to 1966. | | |
| Bison Stadium | Buffalo Bisons/Rangers | Buffalo, New York | 1924 | 1929 | Team is not related to the current Buffalo Bills; Later named Offermann Stadium | | |
| Nash Field | Kenosha Maroons | Kenosha, Wisconsin | 1924 | 1924 | | | |
| City Stadium | Green Bay Packers | Green Bay, Wisconsin | 1925 | 1956 | | | |
| Minersville Park | Pottsville Maroons | Minersville, Pennsylvania | 1925 | 1929 | | | |
| Polo Grounds | New York Giants, New York Bulldogs | New York, New York | 1925, 1949 | 1955 1949 | Also hosted the AFL's New York Titans, later Jets, from 1960 to 1963 | | |
| Ebbets Field | Brooklyn Lions, Brooklyn Dodgers/Tigers | Brooklyn, New York | 1926, 1930 | 1926, 1944 | Not to be confused with MLB's Brooklyn Dodgers (now Los Angeles Dodgers), who also played here at the time. | | |
| East Hartford Velodrome | Hartford Blues | East Hartford, Connecticut | 1926 | 1927 | | | |
| Normal Park | Chicago Cardinals | Chicago, Illinois | 1926 | 1928 | | | |
| Yankee Stadium | New York Yankees, New York Yanks, New York Giants | New York, New York | 1927, 1950, 1956 | 1928, 1951, 1973 | Team unrelated to MLB's New York Yankees, the AAFC's New York Yankees, or the later New York Yanks. | | |
| Braves Field | Boston Bulldogs, Boston Braves | Boston, Massachusetts | 1929, 1932 | 1929, 1932 | | | |
| Kinsley Park | Providence Steam Roller | Providence, Rhode Island | 1929 | 1929 | Site of first NFL night game | | |
| Knights of Columbus Stadium | Orange Tornadoes | East Orange, New Jersey | 1929 | 1929 | | | |
| Newark Schools Stadium | Newark Tornadoes | Newark, New Jersey | 1930 | 1930 | | | |
| Newark Velodrome | Newark Tornadoes | Newark, New Jersey | 1930 | 1930 | | | |
| Universal Stadium | Portsmouth Spartans | Portsmouth, Ohio | 1930 | 1933 | Now called Spartan Municipal Stadium. | | |
| Cleveland Stadium | Cleveland Indians, Cleveland Rams, Cleveland Browns | Cleveland, Ohio | 1931, 1937, 1941, 1950 | 1931, 1937, 1941, 1995 | The Indians played here in their lone NFL season in 1931. The Rams had two stints here, from 1936 to 1937 and again in 1941. The Cleveland Browns played here from 1946 to 1995 (playing in the AAFC from 1946 to 1949) before moving to Baltimore, though the history of the team remained in Cleveland; a new Browns began play at Cleveland Browns Stadium in 1999. | | |
| Baker Bowl | Philadelphia Eagles | Philadelphia, Pennsylvania | 1933 | 1935 | | | |
| Fenway Park | Boston Redskins | Boston, Massachusetts | 1933 | 1936 | Current home of MLB's Boston Red Sox. | | |
| Forbes Field | Pittsburgh Pirates/Steelers | Pittsburgh, Pennsylvania | 1933 | 1963 | Also was the home of the 1943 Steagles and 1944 Card-Pitt, as the Steelers temporarily merged with the Philadelphia Eagles and Chicago Cardinals, respectively. | | |
| Philadelphia Municipal Stadium | Philadelphia Eagles | Philadelphia, Pennsylvania | 1936 | 1939 | | | |
| Griffith Stadium | Washington Redskins | Washington D.C | 1937 | 1960 | | | |
| Shaw Stadium | Cleveland Rams | East Cleveland, Ohio | 1938 | 1938 | | | |
| Shibe Park/Connie Mack Stadium | Philadelphia Eagles | Philadelphia, Pennsylvania | 1940 | 1957 | | | |

== Merger era (1941–1970) ==
Teams from the American Football League (AFL) as well as teams from the All-America Football Conference (AAFC) that removed their stadiums before their merger with the NFL does not count on here, despite their records and statistics being included in the NFL record book, and teams that had the same stadium after the merger will be shown to be either in 1950 or in 1970.

| Stadium | Team(s) | City | Joined Stadium | Left Stadium | Notes (If needed) | References | Images |
|---|---|---|---|---|---|---|---|
| Los Angeles Memorial Coliseum | Los Angeles Rams, Los Angeles Raiders, Los Angeles Chargers | Los Angeles, California | 1946, 1960, 1982, 2016 | 1979, 1960, 1994, 2019 | The Rams moved to Anaheim Stadium in 1980 and returned in 2016 during the construction of SoFi Stadium, which they moved into in 2020.; The Raiders returned to Oakland to play in the Oakland Coliseum in 1995.; The Chargers moved to Balboa Stadium in San Diego in 1961 after just one season in Los Angeles. | | |
| Kezar Stadium | San Francisco 49ers | San Francisco, California | 1950 | 1970 | Moved to Candlestick Park | | |
| Memorial Stadium | Baltimore Colts (1947), Baltimore Colts, Baltimore Ravens | Baltimore, Maryland | 1950, 1953, 1996 | 1950, 1983, 1997 | The original incarnation of the Colts played their lone NFL season here in 1950, going defunct at season's end. A new Baltimore Colts played here from 1953 to 1983 before moving to Indianapolis. The Ravens played here upon moving from Cleveland (though the NFL considers the Ravens as an expansion team) during the construction of Ravens Stadium at Camden Yards (now M&T Bank Stadium). | | |
| Cotton Bowl | Dallas Texans (1952), Dallas Cowboys | Dallas, Texas | 1952, 1960 | 1952, 1970 | Site of the last team to fold.; Different Dallas Texans to the now-Kansas City Chiefs and Houston Texans. | | |
| County Stadium | Green Bay Packers | Milwaukee, Wisconsin | 1953 | 1994 | Secondary home to the Packers, who played one to three games a year in Milwaukee from 1933 to 1994. | | |
| Franklin Field | Philadelphia Eagles | Philadelphia, Pennsylvania | 1958 | 1970 | Shared with the Penn Quakers, who have played here since 1895. | | |
| Pitt Stadium | Pittsburgh Steelers | Pittsburgh, Pennsylvania | 1958 | 1969 | Shared with the Pitt Panthers, who played here until its demolition in 1999. | | |
| District of Columbia Stadium/Robert F. Kennedy Memorial Stadium | Washington Redskins | Washington D.C | 1961 | 1996 | Shared with MLB's second Washington Senators until 1971; moved to Jack Kent Cooke Stadium (now Northwest Stadium) | | |
| Metropolitan Stadium | Minnesota Vikings | Bloomington, Minnesota | 1961 | 1981 | Shared with MLB's Minnesota Twins; moved to the Hubert H. Humphrey Metrodome | | |
| Atlanta Stadium/Atlanta-Fulton County Stadium | Atlanta Falcons | Atlanta, Georgia | 1966 | 1991 | Shared with MLB's Atlanta Braves; moved to the Georgia Dome | | |
| Civic Center Busch Memorial Stadium/Busch Stadium | St. Louis Cardinals, St. Louis Rams | St. Louis, Missouri | 1966, 1995 | 1987, 1995 | Second of three stadiums known as Busch Stadium, which also hosted MLB's St. Louis Cardinals.; Moved to Sun Devil Stadium in Tempe, Arizona (though the team was for a time known as the Phoenix Cardinals).; Interim home for the Rams before Trans World Dome (now The Dome at America's Center) opened later in the 1995 season. | | |
| Tulane Stadium | New Orleans Saints | New Orleans, Louisiana | 1967 | 1974 | Shared with the Tulane Green Wave; moved to the Louisiana Superdome (now Caesars Superdome) | | |
| Riverfront Stadium/Cinergy Field | Cincinnati Bengals | Cincinnati, Ohio | 1970 | 1999 | Shared with MLB's Cincinnati Reds; moved to Paul Brown Stadium (now Paycor Stadium) | | |
| Oakland-Alameda Coliseum | Oakland Raiders | Oakland, California | 1970, 1995 | 1981, 2019 | Shared with MLB's Oakland A's, who played there until 2024; moved to Los Angeles in 1982, returned, then moved to Allegiant Stadium in Las Vegas in 2020. | | |
| Astrodome | Houston Oilers | Houston, Texas | 1970 | 1996 | Shared with MLB's Houston Astros; moved to Tennessee, eventually becoming the Titans. | | |
| Mile High Stadium | Denver Broncos | Denver, Colorado | 1970 | 2000 | Temporarily shared with MLB's Colorado Rockies from 1993 to 1994; moved to Invesco Field (now Empower Field at Mile High) | | |
| Harvard Stadium | Boston Patriots | Boston, Massachusetts | 1970 | 1970 | | | |
| Kansas City Municipal Stadium | Kansas City Chiefs | Kansas City, Missouri | 1970 | 1971 | Site of longest NFL game | | |
| Orange Bowl | Miami Dolphins | Miami, Florida | 1970 | 1986 | Moved to Joe Robbie Stadium (now Hard Rock Stadium) | | |
| San Diego Stadium | San Diego Chargers | San Diego, California | 1970 | 2016 | Shared with MLB's San Diego Padres until 2003; renamed Jack Murphy Stadium 1981-1997; Qualcomm Stadium 1997-2017; moved to Dignity Health Sports Park in Los Angeles on a temporary basis, then to SoFi Stadium | | |
| Shea Stadium | New York Jets | Flushing, New York | 1970 | 1983 | Shared with MLB's New York Mets; also hosted the New York Giants for the 1975 season during the construction of Giants Stadium. | | |
| Three Rivers Stadium | Pittsburgh Steelers | Pittsburgh, Pennsylvania | 1970 | 2000 | Shared with MLB's Pittsburgh Pirates; moved to Heinz Field (now Acrisure Stadium) | | |
| War Memorial Stadium | Buffalo Bills | Buffalo, New York | 1970 | 1972 | Moved to Rich Stadium (now Ralph Wilson Stadium) | | |

== Modern era (1971–present) ==
| Stadium | Team(s) | City | Joined Stadium | Left Stadium | Notes (If needed) | References |
|---|---|---|---|---|---|---|
| Anaheim Stadium | Los Angeles Rams | Anaheim, California | 1980 | 1994 | Shared with MLB's Los Angeles Angels (then California Angels); moved to The Dome at America's Center in St. Louis | |
| Candlestick Park | San Francisco 49ers | San Francisco, California | 1971 | 2013 | Shared with MLB's San Francisco Giants until 1999; moved to Levi's Stadium | |
| The Dome at America's Center | St. Louis Rams | St. Louis, Missouri | 1995 | 2015 | Returned to Los Angeles to play in the Los Angeles Memorial Coliseum during the construction of SoFi Stadium | |
| Foxboro Stadium | New England Patriots | Foxborough, Massachusetts | 1971 | 2001 | Moved to Gillette Stadium | |
| Georgia Dome | Atlanta Falcons | Atlanta, Georgia | 1992 | 2017 | Temporarily shared with the NBA's Atlanta Hawks from 1997 to 1999; moved to Mercedes-Benz Stadium | |
| Giants Stadium | New York Giants, New York Jets | East Rutherford, New Jersey | 1976, 1984 | 2009 | Moved to New Meadowlands Stadium (now MetLife Stadium) | |
| Ralph Wilson Stadium | Buffalo Bills | Orchard Park, New York | 1973 | 2025 | Moved to Highmark Stadium | |
| Hubert H. Humphrey Metrodome | Minnesota Vikings | Minneapolis, Minnesota | 1982 | 2013 | Shared with MLB's Minnesota Twins until 2009. The Vikings played for two seasons at the University of Minnesota's TCF Bank Stadium before moving into their permanent home, U.S. Bank Stadium. | |
| Kingdome | Seattle Seahawks | Seattle, Washington | 1976 | 1999 | Shared with MLB's Seattle Mariners and the NBA's Seattle SuperSonics from 1978 to 1985. The Seahawks played for two seasons at the University of Washington's Husky Stadium before moving into their permanent home, Seahawks Stadium (now Lumen Field). | |
| RCA Dome | Indianapolis Colts | Indianapolis, Indiana | 1984 | 2007 | Moved to Lucas Oil Stadium | |
| Silverdome | Detroit Lions | Pontiac, Michigan | 1975 | 2001 | Shared with the NBA's Detroit Pistons from 1978 to 1988; moved to Ford Field in downtown Detroit | |
| Sun Devil Stadium | Arizona Cardinals | Tempe, Arizona | 1988 | 2005 | Moved to Cardinals Stadium (now State Farm Stadium) in Glendale. Current home of the Arizona State Sun Devils. | |
| Tampa Stadium | Tampa Bay Buccaneers | Tampa, Florida | 1976 | 1997 | Moved to Raymond James Stadium | |
| Texas Stadium | Dallas Cowboys | Irving, Texas | 1971 | 2008 | Moved to Cowboys Stadium (now AT&T Stadium) | |
| Veterans Stadium | Philadelphia Eagles | Philadelphia, Pennsylvania | 1971 | 2002 | Shared with MLB's Philadelphia Phillies; moved to Lincoln Financial Field | |

== NFL stadiums used temporarily ==
| Stadium | Team(s) | City | Joined Stadium | Left Stadium | Notes (If needed) | References |
|---|---|---|---|---|---|---|
| Alamodome | New Orleans Saints | San Antonio, Texas | 2005 | 2005 | Temporary home of the Saints while the Superdome was undergoing damage repairs from Hurricane Katrina. Current home of the UTSA Roadrunners and the UFL's San Antonio Brahmas. | |
| Champaign Memorial Stadium | Chicago Bears | Champaign, Illinois | 2002 | 2002 | Temporary home of the Bears due to the renovation of Soldier Field. Current home of the Illinois Fighting Illini. | |
| Chicago Stadium | 1932 NFL Playoff Game | Chicago, Illinois | 1932 | 1932 | Site of the first indoor NFL game. The building, which could only fit an 80-yard field, was used due to inclement weather. | |
| Clemson Memorial Stadium | Carolina Panthers | Clemson, South Carolina | 1995 | 1995 | Temporary home of the Panthers for their first season during the construction of Bank of America Stadium. Current home of the Clemson Tigers. | |
| Dignity Health Sports Park | Los Angeles Chargers | Carson, California | 2017 | 2019 | Soccer-specific stadium which was the temporary home of the Chargers during the construction of SoFi Stadium. With a seating capacity of 27,000, it had under half the seats of the next smallest NFL stadium at the time, Soldier Field. Current home of MLS's Los Angeles Galaxy. | |
| Grant Field | Atlanta Falcons | Atlanta, Georgia | 1969 | 1969 | Hosted one Falcons home game due to a scheduling conflict with MLB's Atlanta Braves. Current home of the Georgia Tech Yellow Jackets. | |
| Husky Stadium | Seattle Seahawks | Seattle, Washington | 2000 | 2001 | Temporary home of the Seahawks during the construction of Seahawks Stadium (now Lumen Field). Current home of the Washington Huskies. | |
| Liberty Bowl Memorial Stadium | Tennessee Oilers | Memphis, Tennessee | 1997 | 1997 | Temporary home of the Tennessee Oilers (now Titans) during the construction of Nissan Stadium. Current home of the Memphis Tigers and the annual Liberty Bowl game. Now known as Simmons Bank Liberty Stadium. | |
| Tiger Stadium | New Orleans Saints | Baton Rouge, Louisiana | 2005 | 2005 | Temporary home of the Saints while the Superdome was undergoing damage repairs from Hurricane Katrina. Current home of the LSU Tigers. | |
| Marquette Stadium | Green Bay Packers | Milwaukee, Wisconsin | 1952 | 1952 | The Packers played in venues in or near Milwaukee on a part-time basis from 1934 to 1994. Marquette Stadium, which at the time hosted the Marquette Golden Avalanche, was the Packers' secondary home for one year during the construction of Milwaukee County Stadium. Demolished in 1976. | |
| Philadelphia Municipal Stadium | Philadelphia Eagles | Philadelphia, Pennsylvania | 1941 | 1941 | | |
| Shibe Park | Philadelphia Eagles | Philadelphia, Pennsylvania | 1940 | 1940 | | |
| Stanford Stadium | San Francisco 49ers | Stanford, California | 1989 | 1989 | Hosted one 49ers home game while their primary home, Candlestick Park, was undergoing damage repairs from the 1989 Loma Prieta earthquake. Current home to the Stanford Cardinal. | |
| TCF Bank Stadium | Minnesota Vikings | Minneapolis, Minnesota | 2014 | 2015 | Temporary home of the Vikings during the construction of U.S. Bank Stadium. Current home of the Minnesota Golden Gophers. | |
| Memorial Stadium | Minnesota Vikings | Minneapolis, Minnesota | 1969 | 1969 | Hosted one Vikings home game due to a scheduling conflict with MLB's Minnesota Twins. Former home of the Minnesota Golden Gophers; demolished in 1992. | |
| Vanderbilt Stadium | Tennessee Titans | Nashville, Tennessee | 1998 | 1998 | Temporary home of the Tennessee Oilers (now Titans) during the construction of Nissan Stadium. Current home of the Vanderbilt Commodores. | |
| Yale Bowl | New York Giants | New Haven, Connecticut | 1973 | 1974 | Temporary home of the New York Giants during the renovation of Yankee Stadium, though they would eventually construct their own stadium, Giants Stadium. Current home of the Yale Bulldogs. | |
| Twickenham Stadium | NFL International Series | London, England | 2016 | 2017 | Neutral-site venue as part of the NFL International Series. Current home of the England national rugby union team. | |
