= New Stadium at RFK Campus =

Future stadium in Washington, D.C.

- New RFK Stadium
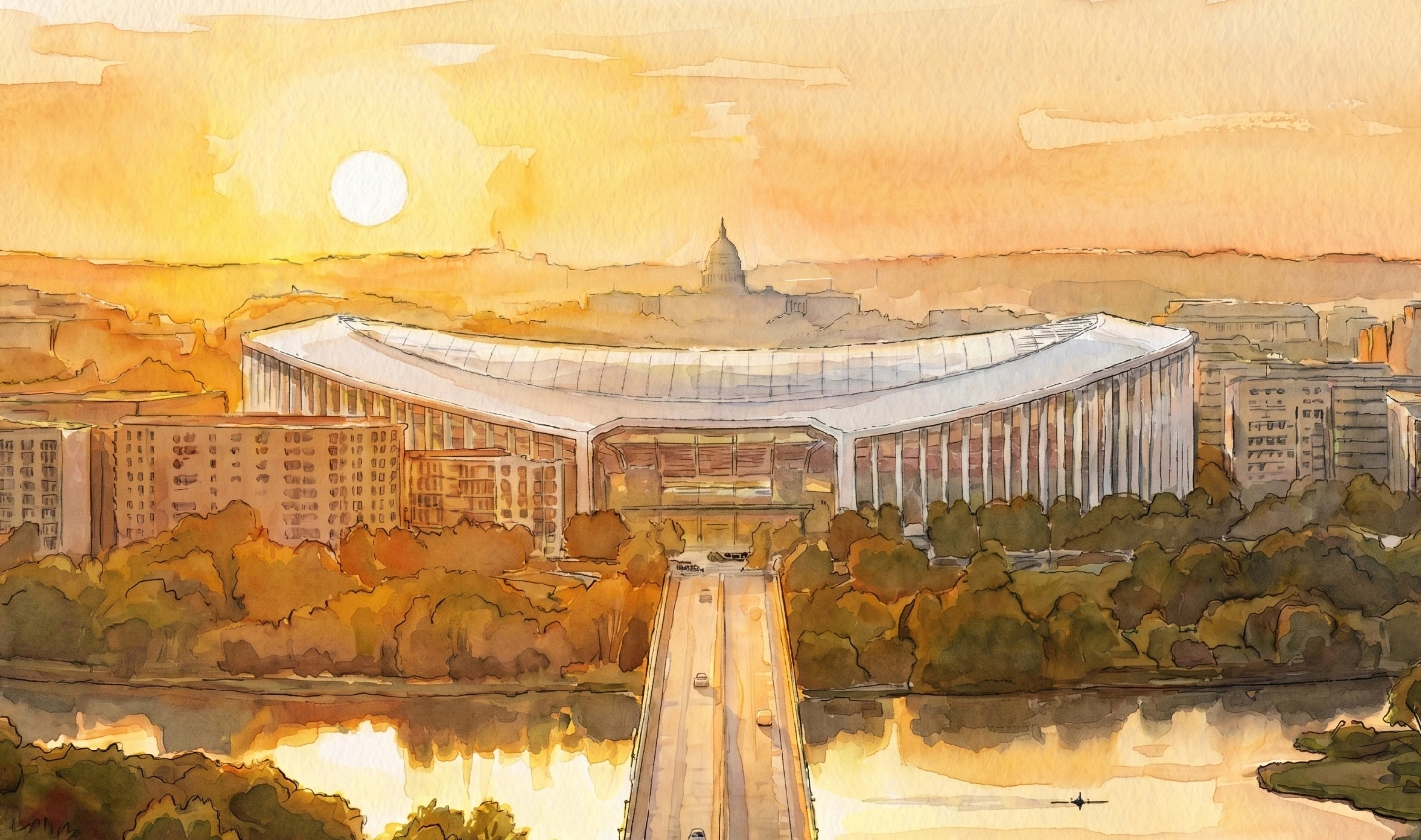
- Stylistic rendering
- Interactive map of New Stadium at RFK Campus
- Address: 2400 East Capitol Street SE
- Location: Washington, D.C., U.S.
- Coordinates: 38°53′24″N 76°58′19″W
- Owner: Government of DC
- Operator: Washington Commanders
- Capacity: 65,000
- Type: Multi-purpose stadium
- Events: American football; soccer; concerts
- Roof: Skylight
- Public transit: Metro: at Stadium–Armory; Metrobus: C41, C51, D24

Construction
- Groundbreaking: 2027; 1 year's time (planned)
- Opened: 2030; 4 years' time (planned)
- Cost: US$3.8 billion
- Architectural style: Neoclassical
- Architect: HKS
- Project manager: District PM Alliance
- General contractors: Clark; Mortenson; SmootDC

Tenant
- Washington Commanders (NFL) (c. 2030)

Website
- OurRFK.DC.gov

New Stadium at RFK Campus is the project name for an indoor stadium in Washington, D.C. scheduled to open in 2030. It will serve as the home venue of the National Football League (NFL) team Washington Commanders and host other sports and public events. The stadium will be the successor of the former RFK Stadium—home of the team from 1961 to 1996 during which they were known as the Washington Redskins—located along the Anacostia River in the city's Hill East neighborhood.

The stadium, designed by architectural firm HKS, will be owned by the government of DC and managed by the Commanders. It is planned for a seating capacity of 65,000 and a neoclassical-inspired colonnade exterior with a skylit roof. The stadium—projected to cost US$3.8 billion—will be among the most expensive ever built and will anchor adjacent mixed-use development.

== History ==
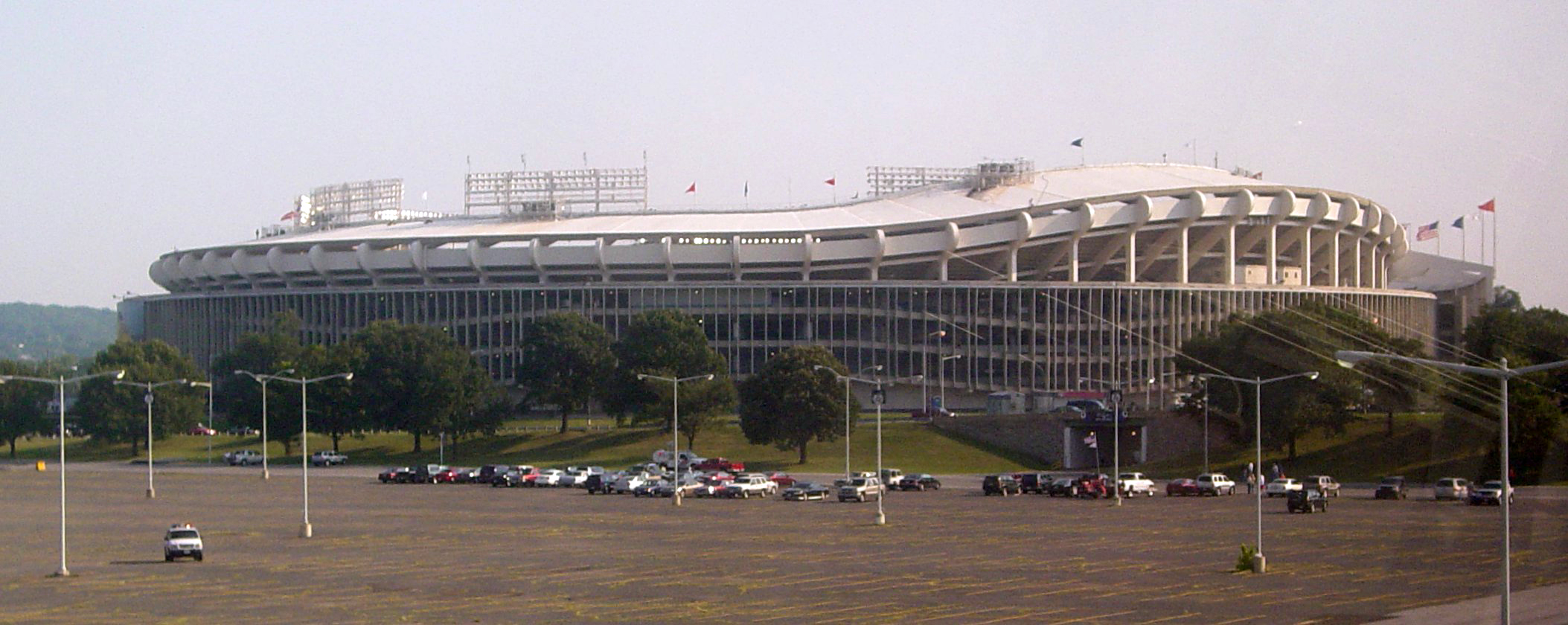
The former RFK Stadium pictured in 2005. New Stadium at RFK Campus is being designed as its successor.

In the early 2010s, the Redskins initiated a search for a site to build a new home venue to replace Northwest Stadium in Landover, Maryland. The team considered Oxon Cove Park in Maryland and Sterling, Dumfries, and Woodbridge in Virginia, but ultimately desired the location of the former Robert F. Kennedy Memorial Stadium in Washington, D.C. RFK Stadium, considered the "spiritual home" of the team by its owners, had previously hosted their games from its opening in 1961 until 1996. It closed in 2019 due to its age and poor condition and was deconstructed in 2025. The campus had been managed by the National Park Service since the District of Columbia Stadium Act of 1957 (H.R. 1937). On July 27, 2023, Congress introduced the D.C. Robert F. Kennedy Memorial Stadium Campus Revitalization Act (H.R. 4984), which proposed transferring control to the DC city government through a 99-year lease and permitting mixed-use development. The act was passed by the House of Representatives on February 28, 2024, the Senate on December 21, 2024, and signed into law by president Joe Biden on January 6, 2025.

On April 28, 2025, DC mayor Muriel Bowser, NFL commissioner Roger Goodell, and Commanders owner Josh Harris held a joint press conference announcing the RFK Campus as the site for the stadium. U.S. president Donald Trump suggested blocking the deal in July 2025 unless the Commanders returned to the Redskins branding and later stated a desire for the stadium to be named after him. The project was tentatively approved by the DC Council in August 2025, with another vote finalizing it the following month. The stadium is expected to open in 2030. Work on foundational infrastructure began in April 2026, with groundbreaking scheduled for early 2027. The stadium will be financed through a public–private partnership between the government of DC owning it and the Commanders managing it. The Commanders are slated to contribute $2.7 billion for its construction, a parking garage, and any additional cost overrun, with DC spending $500 million on infrastructure by way of the Sports Facilities Fee, $356 million on another parking garage by way of Events DC bonds, and $202 million on public utilities by way of general taxes. DC is planning for an expansion of the nearby Stadium–Armory Metrorail station and a new Metrobus rapid transit line mirroring the route of the former DC Streetcar to reduce traffic congestion and reliance on parking around the stadium. The Commanders will collect revenue from personal seat licenses (PSL), tickets, and parking for events, with DC anticipating over $5 billion in sales taxes raised over 30 years. Around 8,000 parking spots will be available on opening day. The stadium is expected to host up to 200 additional events annually, such as concerts, Olympic events, college sports, international soccer and rugby matches, and other ceremonies and gatherings. It is in consideration to host Super Bowl LXV and the 2031 FIFA Women's World Cup final, with the National Women's Soccer League (NWSL) team Washington Spirit suggested as a possible additional tenant.

== Design ==
New Stadium at RFK Campus is an indoor stadium being designed by architectural firm HKS in a neoclassical style inspired by the original RFK Stadium, featuring an exterior of colonnades in a wave pattern and a skylight roof made from cable-netted ETFE. The project will be managed by District PM Alliance, a joint venture between Brailsford & Dunlavey, Creative Artists Agency Icon, and McKissack & McKissack, and constructed by Clark Construction, Mortenson Construction, and SmootDC. The playing surface has not been decided upon, with natural grass being preferred by the Commanders. It will have an seating capacity of 65,000 and upwards of 5,000 in standing-room only, with a section that will be designed to replicate the bouncing stands RFK Stadium was known for. New Stadium at RFK Campus is projected to cost US$3.8 billion, ranking it among the most expensive stadiums ever constructed. The top row of seating will be below 130 ft (40 m) to comply with DC's Height of Buildings Act, with the stadium sunken into the ground and fused with RFK Stadium's original foundation. The site, considered an eastern gateway into Capitol Hill and downtown DC as part of the L'Enfant Plan monumental axis, lies along the western bank of the Anacostia River adjacent to the D.C. Armory approximately 2 miles (3.2 km) east of the United States Capitol and National Mall. The stadium site is bordered by C Street to the north and Independence Avenue to the south, with the streets converging at the Whitney Young Memorial Bridge to continue East Capitol Street eastward. A balcony on the stadium's western entrance will overlook the plaza and offer views of the Capitol building and Washington Monument down East Capitol Street.

== Mixed-use development ==
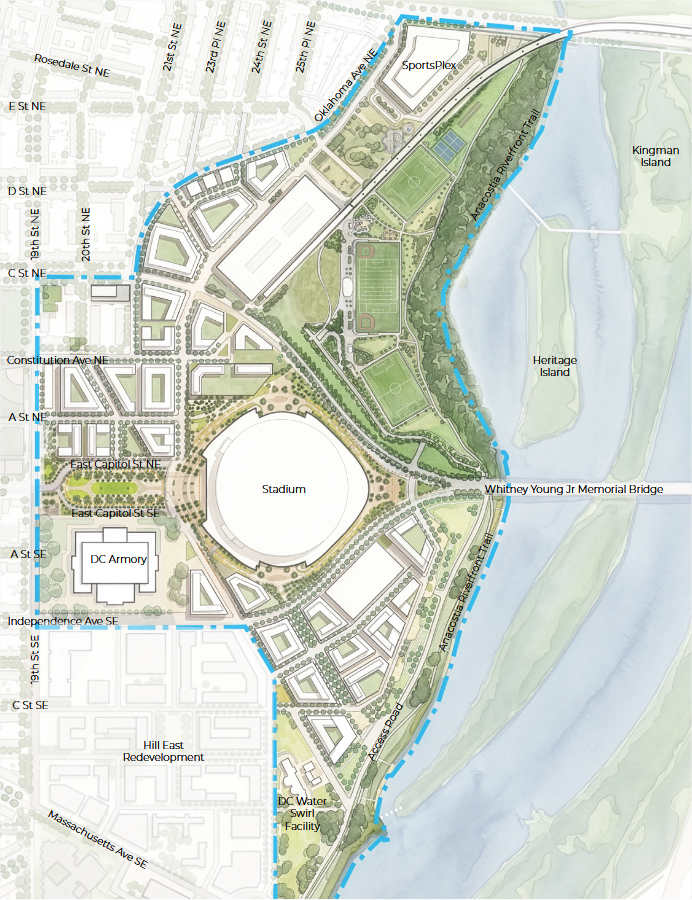
Plans for adjacent mixed-use development

New Stadium at RFK Campus will eventually anchor approximately 180 acres (0.73 km^{2}) of adjacent mixed-use development featuring housing, hotels, restaurants, shops, offices, parks, and public spaces across five districts. The Commanders are to oversee the development of the Plaza and Riverfront districts. The DC Department of Parks and Recreation (DPR) will develop the Recreation district, adding a $89 million indoor gymnasium and sports facility to the existing Fields at RFK recreation center, the Kingman Commons district, which will expand upon the bordering Kingman Park residential neighborhood to the northwest, and the Anacostia Commons, a protected riparian zone along Kingman Lake containing a section of the Anacostia Riverwalk Trail. Around 6,000 residences are expected to be built across Kingman Commons and the Plaza and Riverfront districts, with 30% designated to be affordable. Over a third of the campus will be dedicated to green space, with heritage trees preserved. A grass plaza west of the stadium, known as the Festival Plaza, will host public events, markets, and concerts. The Commanders will move their corporate headquarters next to the stadium while retaining their football operations and training facility in Ashburn, Virginia. Due to phased zoning approval, full district construction is expected to take until 2040.
