= New Huntington Bank Field =

Future stadium in Brook Park, Ohio

- Interactive map of New Huntington Bank Field
- Address: 18300 Snow Road
- Location: Brook Park, Ohio, U.S.
- Coordinates: 41°24′37″N 81°49′24.6″W
- Owner: Brook Park community authority
- Capacity: ~67,500
- Roof: Skylight

Construction
- Groundbreaking: April 30, 2026
- Opened: 2029; 3 years' time (planned)
- Cost: $2.6 billion
- Architect: HKS
- General contractor: (AECOM Hunt/Turner Construction/Independence Construction)

Tenant
- Cleveland Browns (NFL) (c. 2029)

Website
- dome.clevelandbrowns.com/

New Huntington Bank Field is the project name for an indoor stadium in Brook Park, Ohio, U.S., scheduled to open in 2029. The stadium will serve as the home venue of the Cleveland Browns of the National Football League (NFL) and host other sports and public events.

== Background ==
The Browns' lease at their current stadium is set to expire at the end of the 2028 season. Cleveland mayor Justin Bibb and the Browns announced in October 2024 that the team plans to construct a new indoor stadium in suburban Brook Park, at a site adjacent to Cleveland Hopkins International Airport, in time for the 2029 season. The current naming rights deal specifies that the Huntington Bank Field name will be transferred to the new facility once it opens. The city of Cleveland objected to the project, saying such a move would violate Ohio's Modell Law, which is designed to prevent franchises from leaving publicly funded facilities. In response, the team sued the city in October 2024 for clarification on the Modell Law, and the city countersued in January 2025 to enforce the Modell Law. Dennis Kucinich, who served as mayor of Cleveland in the late 1970s and was one of the main authors of the Modell Law when he served in the Ohio Senate, filed a lawsuit in late August 2025 against the Browns on behalf of taxpayers for enforcement of the Modell Law. Public funding for the new stadium was approved by the Ohio legislature on June 30, 2025, and the Ohio Department of Transportation approved the construction permit for the facility on September 18, after it was found that it would not interfere with the airport. The Browns and the city of Cleveland announced an agreement on October 13 that calls for the team to pay the city $100 million, including the costs for demolition of the current stadium, and the Browns will have options to extend the lease through the 2029 and 2030 seasons if the new stadium is not completed in time. The city agreed to drop all lawsuits related to the move and cooperate with the new stadium development including infrastructure improvements around the airport. The team officially broke ground for the project on March 2, 2026, with a ceremonial groundbreaking on April 30.

Preceded by Huntington Bank Field	Home of the Cleveland Browns; 2029 (planned)	Succeeded by none
