= History of the New York Giants =

Sports team history

The New York Giants, an American football team which currently plays in the National Football League (NFL)'s National Football Conference (NFC), has a history dating back almost 100 seasons, with 4 Super Bowl victories. The Giants were founded in 1925 by Tim Mara in the then five-year-old NFL. Mara owned the team until his death in 1959, when it was passed on to his sons, Wellington and Jack. During their history, the Giants have won eight NFL championships, four of which came in Super Bowls.

In just its third season, the team finished with the best record in the league at 11–1–1 and was awarded the NFL title. In a 14-year span beginning in 1933, New York qualified to play in the NFL championship game eight times, winning twice (1934 and 1938). They did not win another championship until 1956, aided by several future Hall of Fame players such as running back Frank Gifford, linebacker Sam Huff, and offensive tackle Roosevelt Brown. From 1958 to 1963, the Giants played in the NFL championship game five times, but failed to win. The 1958 NFL Championship game, in which they lost 23–17 in overtime to the Baltimore Colts, is credited with increasing the popularity of the NFL in the United States.

The Giants registered just two winning seasons from 1964 to 1980 and were unable to advance to the playoffs. From 1981 to 1990, the team qualified for the postseason seven times and won Super Bowls XXI and XXV. The team's success during the 1980s was aided by head coach Bill Parcells, quarterback Phil Simms and Hall of Fame linebackers Lawrence Taylor and Harry Carson. New York struggled throughout much of the 1990s as Parcells left the team, and players such as Simms and Taylor declined and eventually retired. They returned to the Super Bowl in 2000, but lost to the Baltimore Ravens in Super Bowl XXXV. The Giants then won against New England Patriots in Super Bowls XLII and XLVI.

== Birth and success: 1925–1930 ==
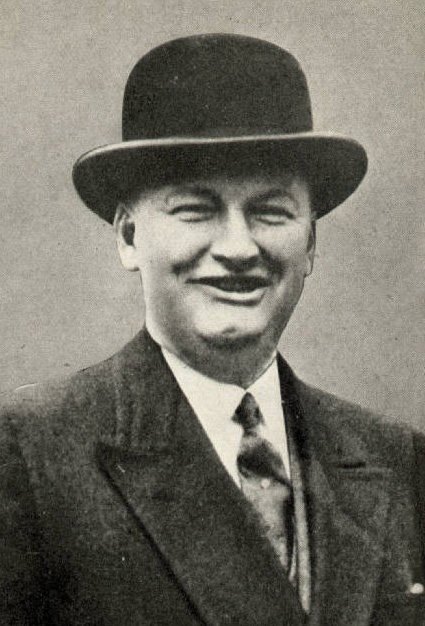
Tim Mara founded the Giants in the year 1925.

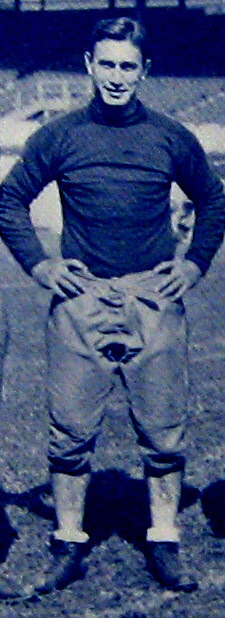
Benny Friedman with the Giants

The Giants were founded in 1925 by original owner Tim Mara with an investment of $500. Legally named "New York Football Giants" (which they still are to this day) to distinguish themselves from the baseball team of the same name, they became one of the first teams in the then five-year-old National Football League. In 1919, Charles Stoneham, the owner of the New York Giants baseball team, had organized and promoted a professional football team to be called the New York Giants. The team folded before its first game, a casualty of a dispute over the city's blue laws. This early Giants football team would eventually make it to play as the Brooklyn Giants in 1921, playing two games in the NFL before dropping out, and eventually folded in 1923 after two years as an independent. When the NFL sought to return to New York City, it approached one of the Brooklyn Giants' owners, promoter Billy Gibson, about reviving the team; he instead referred the league to Mara, who paid a $500 franchise fee and accepted a place in the NFL, keeping the Giants name.

The New York Football Giants played their first game, an exhibition against All New Britain, in New Britain, Connecticut, on October 4, 1925. Their first regular season NFL game took place a week later, on October 11, 1925, in a 0 to 14 loss against the Providence Steam Roller.

Although the Giants were successful on the field in their first season, going 8–4–0, their financial status was a different story. Overshadowed by baseball, boxing, and college football, professional football was not a popular sport in 1925. They were in dire financial straits until the 11th game of the season, when Red Grange and the Chicago Bears came to town, attracting over 73,000 fans. This gave the Giants a much-needed influx of revenue, and perhaps altered the history of the franchise. From 1925 to 1927, former two-time First Team All Pro Doc Alexander played for the team.

New York finished 11–1–1 in 1927. Their league-best defense posted 10 shutouts in 13 games. New coach Earl Potteiger led the team into a late-season game against Chicago with first place on the line. New York won 13–7 in what lineman Steve Owen called "the toughest, roughest football game I ever played." Then they won their final two regular season games to secure their first championship.

Following a disappointing 4–7–2 season the next year, Potteiger was replaced by LeRoy Andrews. Before the 1929 season, Mara purchased the entire squad of the Detroit Wolverines, including star quarterback Benny Friedman. The Wolverines had finished in third place the year before. Led by Friedman, New York's record soared to 13–1–1. However, their lone loss was a 20–6 setback in November to the Green Bay Packers, and by virtue of this win, and their 12–0–1 record, won the NFL title. Following the season, Mara transferred ownership over to his two sons to insulate the team from creditors. At the time, Jack was just 22, and Wellington only 14.

In 1930, the quality of the professional game was still in question, with many claiming the college "amateurs" played with more intensity. In December 1930, the Giants played a team of Notre Dame All-Stars at the Polo Grounds to raise money for the unemployed of New York City. It was also an opportunity to establish the superiority of the pro game. Knute Rockne reassembled his Four Horsemen along with other Notre Dame legends, and told them to score early, then defend. But from the beginning, it was a one-sided contest, with Benny Friedman running for two Giants touchdowns and Hap Moran passing for another. Notre Dame failed to score. When it was over, Rockne told his team, '"[t]hat was the greatest football machine I ever saw. I am glad none of you got hurt." The game raised $115,183 for the homeless, and is often credited with establishing the legitimacy of the professional game.

== Steve Owen era: 1931–1953 ==
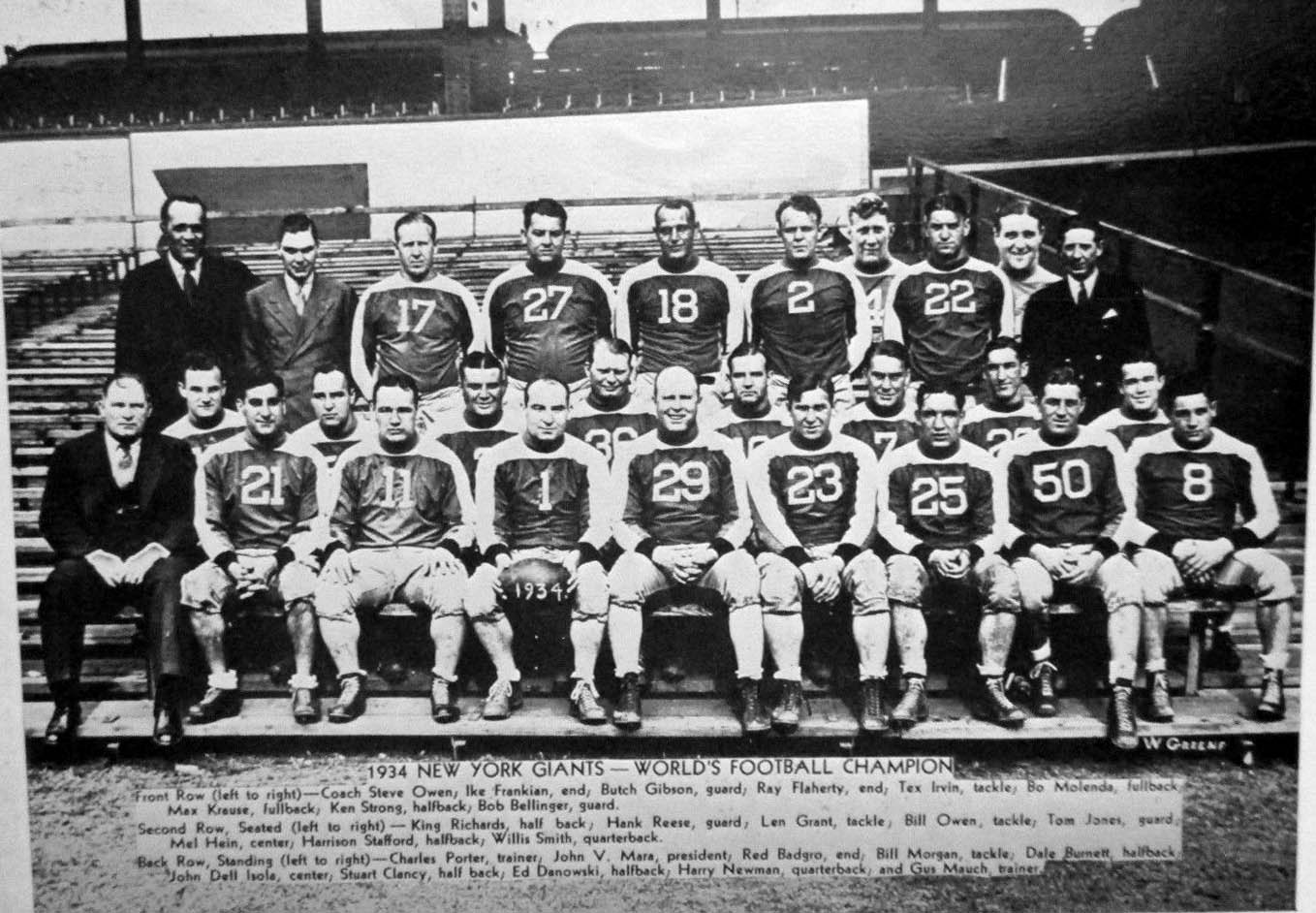
The NY Giants team that won the 1934 championship.

The Giants hired All-Pro offensive tackle Steve Owen to be their new player-head coach prior to the 1931 season. He coached the team for the next 23 years, including two NFL championships, and was inducted into the Pro Football Hall of Fame in 1966. Owen never had a contract with the Mara family; he coached his entire tenure on a handshake basis.

Before the 1931 season, New York acquired center Mel Hein, who also played the linebacker position. He would go on to a fifteen-year NFL career in which, as a center, he became an All-NFL First Team selection eight times, and the only offensive lineman ever named league MVP. Friedman quit the team following the season when Mara denied him an ownership stake, telling him "I'm sorry...but the Giants are for my sons." New York struggled in 1931 and 1932, finishing with a combined record of 11–12–3.

The Giants acquired University of Michigan All-American quarterback Harry Newman and versatile free agent halfback Ken Strong before the 1933 season. New York finished 11–3, first in the new Eastern Division. Newman led the NFL in passes completed (53), passing yards (973), touchdown passes (11), and longest pass completion (78 yards), with his passing yardage total setting an NFL record. New York's resurgence was led by some of the league's best linemen, such as Ray Flaherty and future Hall of Famers Red Badgro, and Hein. They advanced to play in the league's first official championship game in Chicago's Wrigley Field versus the Bears, where they lost 23–21 in a game which had six lead changes.

In the 1934 NFL Championship Game, the Giants defeated previously unbeaten Chicago 30–13 at the Polo Grounds on an icy field with temperatures peaking at 25 degrees. Before the game, team treasurer John Mara talked with Owen and team captain Flaherty about the field conditions. Flaherty suggested the Giants wear sneakers on the frozen field, as he had played in a game under similar circumstances at Gonzaga, and the sneakers proved to be effective. Mara dispatched equipment manager Abe Cohen to get as many sneakers as he could get. Due to traffic and the inability to find any athletic goods stores open on Sunday, Cohen was unable to return before the game started, and the Giants, wearing conventional footwear, trailed 10–3 at the end of the first half. Realizing time was short, Cohen went to Manhattan College — where he had a key to the equipment and locker rooms — and returned to the Polo Grounds at halftime with nine pairs of basketball sneakers, saying that "nine pairs was all I could get." Players donned the sneakers and New York, after allowing Chicago another field goal late in the 3rd quarter, responded with 27 unanswered points in the 4th quarter to win their first NFL Championship game. The game would come to be known as "The Sneakers Game", and the 27 points the Giants scored in the 4th quarter set a single–quarter championship game scoring record that stood for decades. After the game, offensive tackle Len Grant expressed his sincere gratitude by stating "God bless Abe Cohen."

The Giants were unable to repeat as champions in 1935, as they fell to the Detroit Lions 26–7 in the NFL Championship game. The Lions staked a 13–0 lead before the Giants were able to cut the lead to 13–7 in the 3rd quarter. However, the Lions defense helped their team score two late touchdowns with a blocked punt and an interception.

The Giants were so successful from the latter half of the 1930s until the United States' entry into World War II, that according to one publication, "[f]rom 1936 to 1941 the New York Giants annually fielded a collection of NFL all-stars." They added their third NFL championship in 1938 with a 23–17 win over Green Bay. The Giants blocked two Green Bay punts to establish an early advantage before the Packers came back to take a 17–16 lead. However, in the 4th quarter, Ed Danowski threw a 23-yard touchdown pass to Hank Soar, and the Giants defense held the Packers scoreless.

The Giants made the championship game again the next year, but lost in a rematch to the Packers, 27–0 They also advanced to the championship game in 1941, losing to the Bears, 37–9. Both games were close early before their respective opponents went on an offensive surge to break the game open late. In 1944, the Giants reached the championship game, where they faced the Green Bay Packers for the third time in ten seasons. This 1944 Giants team is considered to have been the best defensive team in NFL history in terms of points per game allowed, "...a truly awesome unit". They gave up only 7.5 points per game (a record that still stands) and shut out five of their ten opponents. Nonetheless, they lost again in the championship game, this time 14–7 as Ted Fritsch scored two touchdowns. The Packers defense held on to the lead despite a fourth-quarter touchdown by the Giants. Giants quarterback Arnie Herber (who previously had played for the Packers) threw no less than four interceptions in the game. The 1944 Giants were a mere No. 5 in scoring offense in the 10-team NFL. By 1946, Mara had given over complete control of the team to his two sons. Jack controlled the business aspects, while Wellington controlled the on-field operations. In 1946, the Giants again reached the Championship game, for the eighth time in 14 seasons. However, they were beaten by the Sid Luckman-led Bears, 24–14.

Before the 1948 season, the Giants signed defensive back Emlen Tunnell, the first African American player in team history, and later the first African American inducted into the Hall of Fame. From 1947 to 1949, they never finished above .500, but came back with a 10–2 record in 1950. However, they lost to the Cleveland Browns, whom they had beaten twice in the regular season, 8–3, in the 1950 divisional playoff game. In 1949, halfback Gene "Choo-Choo" Roberts scored a league-high 17 touchdowns, and in 1950, he set a team record that would stand for over 50 years, when he rushed for 218 yards on November 12.

== Jim Lee Howell and the Hall of Famers: 1954–1958 ==
Following the 1953 season, an important transition in Giants history occurred. After being the team's coach for 23 years, Steve Owen was fired by Wellington and Jack Mara, and replaced by Jim Lee Howell. Wellington later described the move by calling it "the hardest decision I'd ever made". New York went 7–5 in 1954 under Howell. In their 31st and final season playing their home games at the Polo Grounds in 1955, they went 5–1–1 over their final seven games to finish 6–5–1. They were led by rejuvenated running back Frank Gifford, who played the entire season solely on offense for the first time in several years.

The Giants won their fourth NFL Championship in 1956. Playing their home games at Yankee Stadium for the first time, New York won the Eastern Division with an 8–3–1 record. In the NFL Championship Game on an icy field against the Chicago Bears, the Giants wore sneakers as they had 22 years previous. They dominated the Bears, winning 47–7. The 1956 Giants featured a number of future Hall of Fame players, including Gifford, Sam Huff, and Roosevelt Brown. Equally notable, the team featured as its coordinators future Hall of Fame head coaches Tom Landry (defense) and Vince Lombardi (offense).

=== The Greatest Game Ever Played: 1958 ===
The Giants had another successful year in 1958. They tied for the Eastern Division regular season title with a 9–3 record by defeating the Cleveland Browns 13–10 on the last day of the regular season. They beat the Browns again a week later in a one-game playoff to determine the division winner. They advanced to play the Baltimore Colts in the NFL Championship Game. This game, which would become known as "The Greatest Game Ever Played", is considered a watershed moment in league history, and marked the beginning of the rise of professional football into the dominant sport in the American market. The game was competitive. The Giants got off to an early 3–0 lead, then the Colts scored two touchdowns to take a 14–3 halftime lead.

In the 3rd quarter, New York's defense made a goal line stand, which became a turning point in the game. New York, who had trouble mounting drives to that point, then had a 95-yard drive which culminated in a touchdown, making the score 14–10. They drove again in the 4th quarter, with quarterback Charlie Conerly throwing a 15-yard touchdown pass to Frank Gifford to take the lead, 17–14.

The Colts put together one last drive with less than two minutes left. The standout player was receiver Raymond Berry, who caught three passes for 62 yards, the last one for 22 yards to the New York 13-yard line. With seven seconds left in regulation, Steve Myhra kicked a 20-yard field goal to tie the score 17–17, sending a game to overtime for the first time in NFL history.

After winning the coin toss and receiving the ball, the Giants offense stalled and was forced to punt. From their own 20, the Colts drove the ball to the New York 1-yard line, where Alan Ameche ran for a touchdown to give the Colts the championship, 23–17.

== More success: 1959–1963 ==
New York's success continued in the 1960s. They finished 9–3 in 1959 and faced the Colts in a championship game rematch. They lost again, this time in a far less dramatic game, 31–16. Led by quarterback Y. A. Tittle and head coach Allie Sherman, the Giants won three consecutive Eastern Division titles from 1961 to 1963. In 1961, they were beaten 37–0 by the Packers. In 1962, they went into the championship game with a 12–2 record and a nine–game winning streak, but they lost to the Packers again, 16–7.

The Giants finished with an 11–3 record in 1963 and faced the Bears in the NFL championship game. On an icy field in Chicago, the Giants' defense played well, but the Bears newly invented zone defense, coordinated by George Allen, intercepted Tittle five times and battered him throughout the game. Sherman resisted calls from players such as linebacker Sam Huff to replace the struggling Tittle. The Giants defense held the Bears in check, but they lost 14–10, their third straight NFL Championship Game defeat.

The Giants' run of championship game appearances combined with their large market location translated into financial success. By the early 1960s, the Giants were receiving $175,000 a game under the NFL's television contract with CBS — four times as much as small-market Green Bay, which was one of the most successful teams of the era. However, in the league's new contract, the Maras convinced the other owners that it would be in the best interest of the NFL to share television revenue equally, a practice which is still current, and is credited with strengthening the league.

== Wilderness years begin: 1964–1972 ==
After the 1963 season, the team fell apart. A roster filled with mostly older veterans plus some bad personnel moves (e.g. the dispatching of Rosey Grier, Sam Huff, and Don Chandler) led to a quick exit from the top of the standings. The Giants finished 2–10–2 in 1964, beginning an 18-season playoff drought. Tittle and Gifford retired following the season.

The seasons of 1964 through 1980 in team history have often been referred to as "the wilderness years" for several reasons: 1) The franchise lost its status as an elite NFL team by posting only two winning seasons (1970 and 1972), against twelve losing and three .500 seasons during this span; 2) The Giants became a "team of nomads," calling four different stadiums home in the 1970s (Yankee Stadium, the Yale Bowl, Shea Stadium, and finally Giants Stadium in 1976); 3) New York tried several head coach and quarterback combinations during this period, but with almost no success (from 1964 to 1983, no coach or starting quarterback could boast even a .500 record). The team rebounded with a 7–7 record in 1965, (mostly due to the acquisition of quarterback Earl Morrall during the offseason) before compiling a league-worst 1–12–1 record and allowing over 500 points on defense in 1966. This season also included a 72–41 loss to the rival Washington Redskins at D.C. Stadium in the highest-scoring game in league history. Interest in the team was waning, especially with the rapid rise of the New York Jets, with their wide-open style of play and charismatic quarterback Joe Namath.

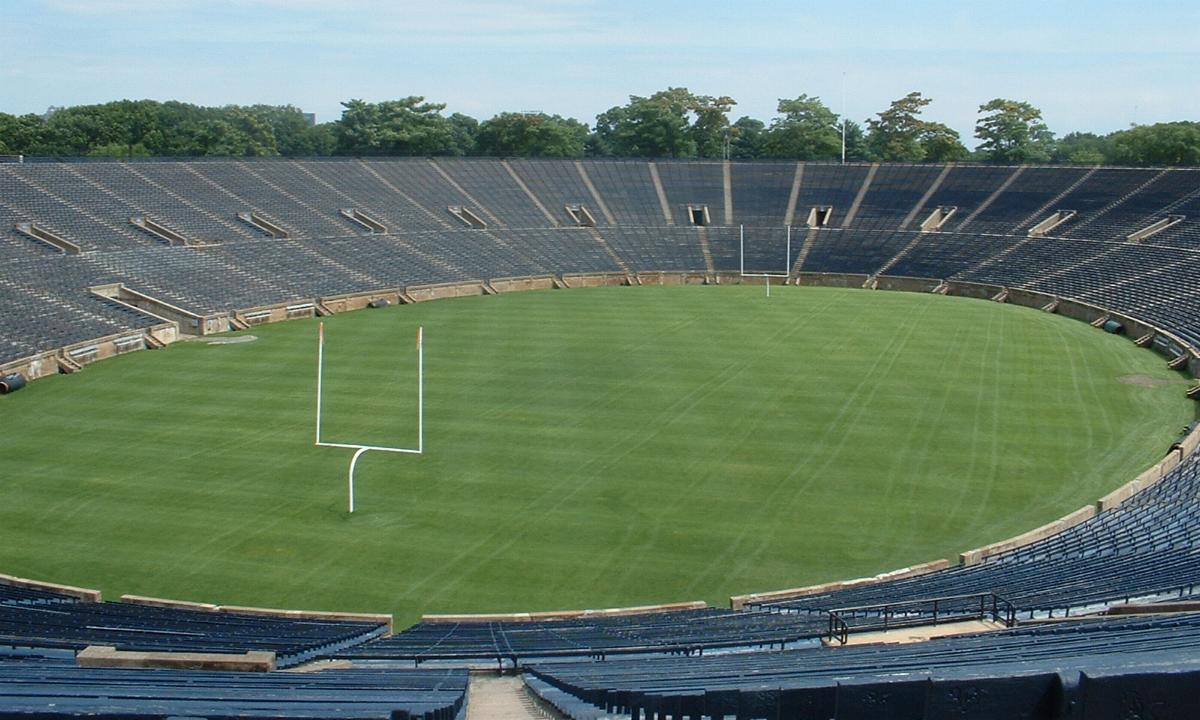
The Yale Bowl was the site of the Giants' first meeting with the Jets in 1969, and later served as their home for parts of two seasons.

The Giants acquired quarterback Fran Tarkenton from the Minnesota Vikings before the 1967 season in exchange for their 1st- and 2nd-round draft picks, and showed improvement. They finished 7–7 in 1967 and were 7–3 through ten games in 1968. Leaving them one game behind Capitol Division leader Dallas. However, New York dropped its final four games to again finish 7–7. Notably, in 1968, one of Tarkenton's favorite targets, wide receiver Homer Jones made the Pro Bowl; it wasn't until 2010 that another Giants receiver, (Steve Smith), would make the Pro Bowl. Since Smith, Victor Cruz (2012) and Odell Beckham Jr. (2014–16) have made it to the Pro Bowl. Jones' average of 22.3 yards per reception for his career is still an NFL record.

During the 1969 preseason, the Giants lost their first meeting with the Jets, 37–14 at the Yale Bowl in New Haven, Connecticut. Following the game, Wellington Mara fired coach Allie Sherman and replaced him with former Giants fullback Alex Webster. On opening day of the 1969 regular season, Tarkenton led New York to a 24–23 victory over his former team, the Vikings, by throwing two touchdown passes in the 4th quarter. The Giants went 6–8 that season. They showed marked improvement in 1970; after an 0–3 start, they rebounded to finish 9–5, narrowly missing the playoffs by losing their final game to the Los Angeles Rams. Tarkenton had one of his best seasons as a Giant and made his fourth straight Pro Bowl. Running back Ron Johnson was also selected to the Pro Bowl; the halfback ran for 1,027 yards, becoming the first Giant to gain 1,000 yards rushing in a season.

In 1971, Johnson missed most of the season with a knee injury, and New York dropped to 4–10, resulting in Tarkenton being traded back to the Vikings. The Giants rallied somewhat in 1972 to finish 8–6. Journeyman quarterback Norm Snead (acquired in the trade for Tarkenton) led the league in completion percentage and had his best season. Other standouts and Pro Bowl selections that year were running back Johnson, who rushed for 1,182 yards (breaking his own team record) and caught 45 passes, tight end Bob Tucker, who followed up his 1971 NFC-leading 59-catch season with 55 in 1972, and defensive stars Jack Gregory and John Mendenhall. The Giants boasted the top offense in the NFC and after a season-finishing 23–3 win at Dallas to secure their second winning campaign in three years, the future looked bright. However, after the 1972 season, New York would endure one of the worst periods in its history.

== Leaving New York: 1973–1978 ==
Desiring their own home stadium, in 1973, the Giants reached an agreement with the New Jersey Sports and Exposition Authority to play their home games at a new, state-of-the-art, dedicated football stadium. Later named Giants Stadium, it was to be built at a new sports complex in East Rutherford, New Jersey.

As the complex was being built, and their current home at Yankee Stadium was being renovated, they would be without a home for three years, and dubbed "the orphans of the NFL." Their final full season at Yankee Stadium was 1972. After playing their first two games there in 1973, the Giants played the rest of their home games in 1973, as well as all of their home games in 1974, at the Yale Bowl in New Haven, Connecticut. This was done out of a desire to have their own home field, as opposed to having to share Shea Stadium with the Jets. However, between access problems, neighborhood issues, the fact that the Yale Bowl was not ideally suited for pro football (the stadium, then as now, did not have permanent lights), the age of the stadium (built in 1914), and the lack of modern amenities (the stadium lacks locker rooms, forcing teams to walk 200 yards between Smilow Field Center to the stadium), the Giants reconsidered their decision and agreed to share Shea Stadium with the Jets in 1975. New York left the Yale Bowl after losing all seven home games played there in 1974 and compiling a home record of 1–11 over that two-year stretch.

One of the bright spots in this era was tight end Bob Tucker. From 1970 through 1977, Tucker was one of the top tight ends in the NFL. He amassed 327 receptions, 4,376 yards, and 22 touchdowns during his years as a Giant.

Despite their new home and heightened fan interest, New York still played subpar football in 1976 and 1977. In 1978, the Giants started the year 5–6 and on November 19, 1978, played the Philadelphia Eagles at home with a chance to solidify their playoff prospects. However, the season imploded in one of the most improbable finishes in NFL history. The Giants led 17–12 and had possession of the ball with only 30 seconds left. They had to just kneel the ball to end the game, as the Eagles had no time outs. However, instead of kneeling the ball, offensive coordinator Bob Gibson ordered New York quarterback Joe Pisarcik to hand the ball off to fullback Larry Csonka. Csonka was unprepared to receive the handoff, and the ball rolled off his hip and bounced free. Eagles safety Herman Edwards picked up the loose ball and ran, untouched, for a score, giving the Eagles an improbable 19–17 victory. This play is referred to as "The Miracle in the Meadowlands" among Eagles fans, and "The Fumble" among Giants fans.

In the aftermath of the defeat, Gibson was fired, and the Giants lost three out of their last four games to finish out of the playoffs for the 15th straight season, leading them to let coach John McVay go as well. However, following the 1978 season came the steps that would, in time, return New York to the pinnacle of the NFL.

== Building a champion: 1979–1985 ==
New York decided to hire a general manager for the first time in franchise history following the 1978 season. The search grew contentious and fractured the relationship between owners Wellington and Tim Mara. Finally, the Maras asked NFL Commissioner Pete Rozelle to step in with a recommendation. Rozelle recommended George Young, who worked in personnel for the Miami Dolphins and had been an assistant coach for the Baltimore Colts. Young was hired, but the rift between the Maras lasted for several years.

Young hired San Diego Chargers assistant Ray Perkins as head coach and drafted unknown quarterback Phil Simms from Morehead State to the surprise of many. New York continued to struggle, finishing 6–10 in 1979 and 4–12 in 1980. With the 2nd overall pick in the 1981 draft, the Giants selected linebacker Lawrence Taylor. The impact that Taylor had on the Giants' defense was immediate. He was named the NFL Defensive Rookie of the Year and NFL Defensive Player of the Year, becoming, to date, the only rookie to ever win the NFL Defensive Player of the Year award. His arrival raised the Giants linebacking corps — which already included future Hall of Famer Harry Carson and Pro Bowler Brad Van Pelt — into one of the NFL's best. It also predicated New York's transformation from allowing 425 points in 1980 to 257 in 1981. Another bright spot was the rushing game; keyed by the acquisition (via trade from the Houston Oilers) of running back Rob Carpenter in early October. Carpenter rushed for 748 yards and scored five touchdowns thru the balance of the season and the Giants went 9–7. They defeated the Eagles in the first round of the playoffs, 27–21, then lost to the eventual Super Bowl champion San Francisco 49ers 38–24 in the divisional playoffs.

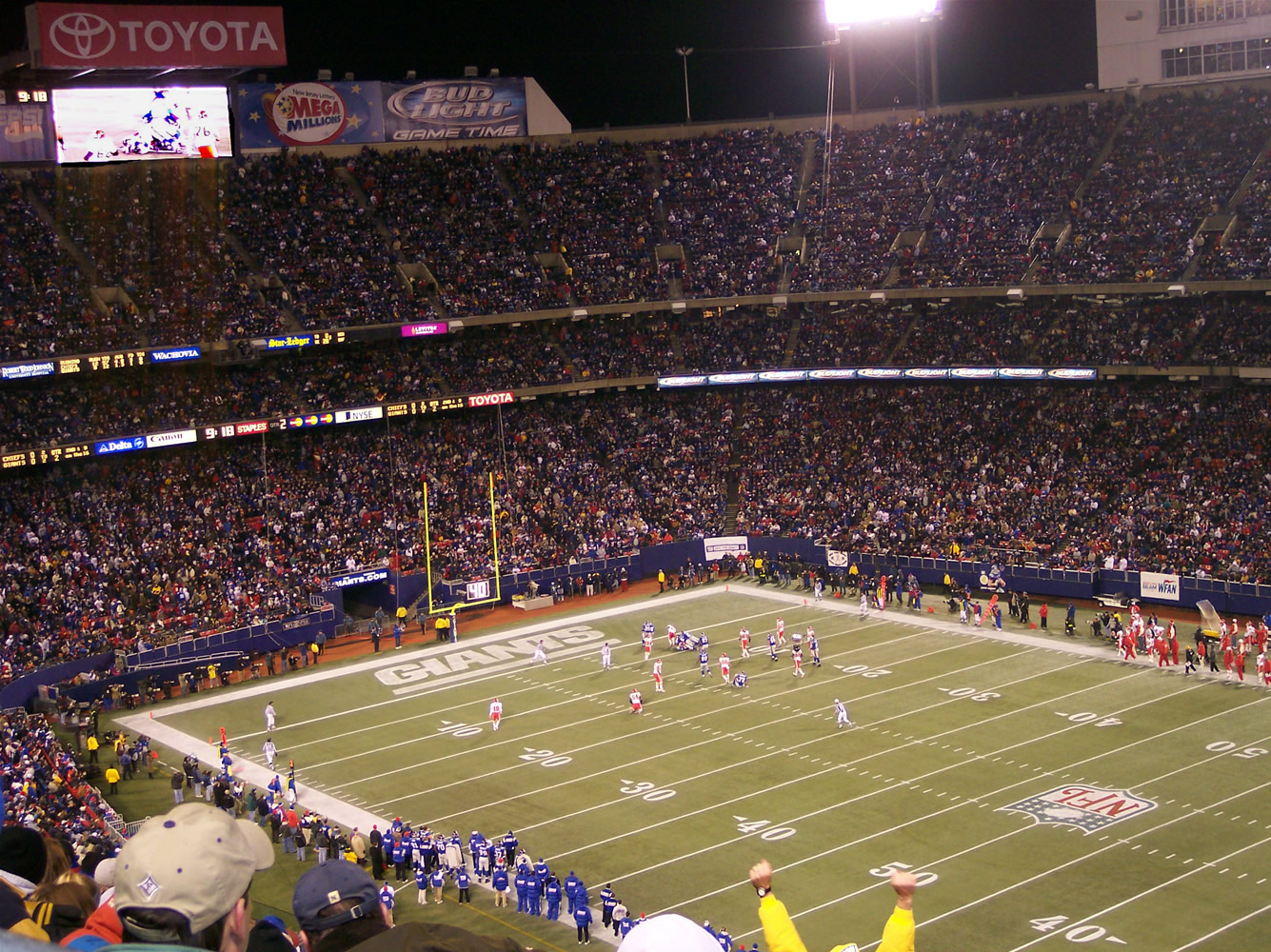
Giants Stadium was home to the Giants from 1976 to 2009.

In the strike-shortened 1982 season, the Giants lost their first two games before the strike, and their first game upon returning. They won their next three games to even their record at 3–3. Perkins then announced that he was leaving to take the head coaching job at Alabama after the season (replacing the legendary Bear Bryant in that capacity), and the team lost the next two games, effectively eliminating them from the playoffs (despite defeating the Eagles in the season finale to go 4–5). Taylor remained a bright spot, repeating as the league's Defensive Player of the Year. Young chose Bill Parcells, the Giants' defensive coordinator, as the team's new head coach.

Parcells first year proved difficult. In his first major decision, he named Scott Brunner as his starting quarterback over Phil Simms. At first, it appeared his decision was justified, especially after a 27–3 Monday night victory over Green Bay gave New York a 2–2 record. But then they lost 10 of their final 12 games. Parcells ignored fans' protests and stuck with Brunner for most of the year, although Jeff Rutledge saw considerable late-season action. Simms finally played in a week six game against the Eagles, only to suffer a season–ending thumb injury.

Simms won the starting job back in 1984, and Brunner was traded. The Giants had a resurgent season, highlighted by a second-half stretch where they won five of six games. Despite losing their last two to finish 9–7, they still made the playoffs. In the first round, they defeated the highly favored Los Angeles Rams 16–13 on the road before losing 21–10 to the eventual Super Bowl champion San Francisco 49ers. Simms threw for 4,044 yards, making him the first Giant to pass for 4,000 yards in a season.

The Giants success continued in 1985 by going 10–6. The defense carried the team and led the NFL in sacks with 68. They won their first-round playoff game, 17–3 over the defending champion 49ers. It was New York's first postseason win at home since 1958, and their first ever at Giants Stadium. In the divisional playoffs, they lost 21–0 to the eventual Super Bowl champion Chicago Bears. Many of the players that would play key roles on New York's Super Bowl teams emerged in 1985. Joe Morris became the feature back, running for 1,338 yards, scoring 21 touchdowns, and making the Pro Bowl. Second-year receiver Lionel Manuel led the Giants with 49 receptions, and rookie tight end Mark Bavaro had 37 catches. Simms threw every pass for New York for the second consecutive season, and passed for over 3,800 yards. Defensive end Leonard Marshall recorded 15.5 sacks, and Taylor added 13.

== Back on top: 1986–1990 ==
=== 1986: Super Bowl Champions ===
New York entered the 1986 season as one of the favorites to win the Super Bowl. They had their first test in a Monday Night game against the defending NFC East champion Dallas Cowboys. They lost at Texas Stadium, 31–28. However, they won their next five in a row and 14 of their last 15, to finish the season with a 14–2 record. One of the signature plays of the season occurred during a Monday Night game in December. Here is a description of the play taken from a Monday Night Football broadcast in 2005: "On December 1st, 1986...with the Giants trailing, (Mark) Bavaro catches an innocent pass from Phil Simms over the middle. It takes nearly seven 49ers defenders to finally drag him down, some of which are carried for almost 20 yards, including future Hall of Famer Ronnie Lott. Bavaro’s inspiring play jump starts the Giants, who win the game and eventually the Super Bowl." New York's defense allowed 236 points during the season, second fewest in the NFL, and Taylor set a team record with 20.5 sacks. He won a record third Defensive Player of the Year Award, and was named league MVP.

The Giants defeated San Francisco 49–3 in the NFC Divisional Playoffs, then Washington 17–0 in the NFC Championship Game. The Giants advanced to play the Denver Broncos in Super Bowl XXI in front of 101,063 fans at the Rose Bowl. After falling behind 10–9 at halftime, they came back to beat the Broncos 39–20. Simms was named the game's MVP after completing 22 of 25 (88%) of his passes—a Super Bowl record.

=== 1987–1989 ===
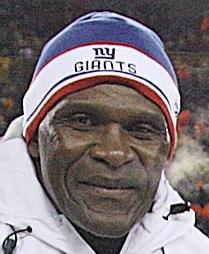
Hall of Fame Inside linebacker Harry Carson (pictured in 2008) played for the Giants from 1975 to 1988, making nine pro bowls.

In 1987, the Giants lost their first two games before the players strike. Unlike the players strike five years previous, NFL owners made a decision to use replacement players, but still lost all three replacement games, including lopsided home losses vs. the 49ers and Redskins, putting them at 0–5 when the strike ended. Though the Giants went 6–4 over their final 10 games, they finished out of the playoffs at 6–9. Bright spots for the season included tight end Mark Bavaro, who led the team in catches with 55, and three New York's linebackers making the Pro Bowl—Taylor, Carson, and Carl Banks.

New York's 1988 season got off to a turbulent start due an offseason scandal involving Taylor. Taylor had abused cocaine, violating the NFL's substance abuse policy and was suspended for the first four games of the season. Taylor's over-the-edge lifestyle was becoming an increasing concern for fans and team officials. After his return, however, Taylor recorded 15.5 sacks in 12 games. The intense worry and scrutiny would prove to be for naught as for the rest of his career Taylor would pass his drug tests.

Predictably, the Giants struggled to start the season. They were 2–2 when Taylor returned from his suspension. With Taylor back and playing well, however, they won six out of their next eight games. After two straight losses, the Giants won their next three contests to set up a win-or-go-home game against the Jets in the season finale. The Jets upset the Giants 27–21. When the Eagles beat the Cowboys, and the 49ers lost to the Rams later that night, the Eagles won the NFC East and the Rams clinched the final Wild Card berth. The Giants finished on the outside looking in despite a 10–6 record, because in the tiebreakers, they were swept in the season series by Philadelphia and had a worse conference record than the Rams.

The Giants' 12–4 record in 1989 was the NFC's second-best (only to San Francisco's 14–2 record) They lost their divisional playoff game in overtime to the Rams, 19–13. The highlight of the game was wide receiver Flipper Anderson's catch of the game-winning touchdown pass. After catching the ball, Anderson made a long run to the end zone, silencing the crowd in attendance. In 1989, free-agent acquisition Ottis Anderson ran for 1,023 yards and caught 28 passes. Rookie Dave Meggett also emerged as a threat on third downs and special teams, catching 34 passes for 531 yards, and making the Pro Bowl.

=== 1990: Champions again ===
The Giants won their first 10 games of the 1990 season, setting a record for the best start in the team's history. The San Francisco 49ers also got off to a strong start, matching New York with their own 10–0 start. Although both teams lost their next game, their Week 13 matchup was still eagerly anticipated. The Giants held the 49ers' vaunted offense to seven points, but scored just three themselves.

New York won the following week against Minnesota before facing the Buffalo Bills in their regular season home finale. Despite holding a significant advantage in time of possession, they lost 17–13, for their third loss in four games. To compound New York's problems, Phil Simms went down with an injury that would sideline him for the rest of the year. His replacement, Jeff Hostetler, was an unproven career backup, who had thrown a mere 68 passes coming into the season.

The Giants won their final two games vs. the Cardinals and 1-15 Patriots to secure a 13–3 record and a first-round playoff bye as the NFC's #2 seed. They defeated Chicago 31–3 in the Divisional Playoffs, setting up a rematch with the 49ers in San Francisco for the NFC Championship. As they had in Week 13, the Giants' defense held San Francisco's offense in check. In the game's waning moments, nose tackle Erik Howard caused a Roger Craig fumble, and Taylor recovered it. New York drove downfield into San Francisco territory, and on the game's last play, kicker Matt Bahr hit a 42-yard field goal to defeat the 49ers, 15–13.

The win set up another rematch, this time in the Super Bowl against the Buffalo Bills.

==== Super Bowl XXV ====
Super Bowl XXV took place amidst a background of war and patriotism. The Persian Gulf War had begun less than two weeks previous, and the nation rallied around the Super Bowl as a symbol of America. The Giants got off to a quick 3–0 lead; however, the Bills scored the next 12 points. The Giants responded by running a nearly eight-minute drive, which culminated in a 14-yard touchdown pass from Hostetler to Stephen Baker.

The Giants received the second-half kickoff and mounted a record-setting drive. The opening drive ran for over nine minutes (a Super Bowl record) and culminated in a 1-yard touchdown run by Ottis Anderson, giving the Giants a 17–12 lead. On the first play of the 4th quarter, the Bills' Thurman Thomas ran for a 31-yard touchdown that put Buffalo back in front, 19–17. On the ensuing possession, the Giants drove down to the Buffalo 4-yard line, and Bahr made a 21-yard field goal, which gave the Giants a 20–19 lead. Both teams exchanged possessions before the Bills began one final drive, driving down to the Giants 29-yard line to set up what would be a potential game-winning 47-yard field goal attempt by Scott Norwood. In what would become the game's signature moment, Norwood's attempt missed wide right, and the Giants won their second Super Bowl, 20–19.

The Giants set a Super Bowl record for time of possession with a mark of 40:33, and Ottis Anderson was named MVP of the game after rushing for 102 yards and a touchdown.

=== End of an era ===
The 1990 season marked the end of an era. After the Super Bowl, defensive coordinator Bill Belichick left to become head coach of the Cleveland Browns. Parcells also decided to leave the Giants in the spring of 1991 to pursue a career in broadcasting. In addition, there was an ownership change in what had been one of the most stable front offices in professional sports. In February 1991, Tim Mara was diagnosed with cancer, and he sold his 50% interest in the team to Bob Tisch for a reported $80 million. This marked the first time since their inception in 1925 that the Giants had not been wholly owned and controlled by the Mara family.

== After Parcells – the Handley era: 1991–1992 ==
Following the departure of Parcells and Belichick — who many people saw as the likely successor to Parcells — the surprise choice as head coach was running backs coach Ray Handley. Handley, however, was a somewhat reluctant coach, whose approach stood in stark contrast to the passionate and emotional style employed by Parcells.

As with Parcells eight years previous, one of Handley's first major decisions involved replacing Phil Simms as starting quarterback. Jeff Hostetler was named the team's starter. Though the Giants won their opening game in an NFC Championship Game rematch against the 49ers, 16–14, they lost three out of their next four games to drop to 2–3. Though they rallied to finish the season 8–8, and Simms reclaimed his starting job later in the year, the excitement that surrounded the Giants the previous year was gone. One of the few promising young players to emerge on the team was second–year running back Rodney Hampton, who led the Giants in rushing with 1,059 yards.

Through the 1991 season, it was clear that the team's core players on defense had aged quickly. This deterioration continued in 1992, when Lawrence Taylor ruptured his Achilles tendon in the team's tenth game, and the Giants promptly lost six out of their last seven games to finish the year 6–10. The defense continued its descent, finishing 26th in the league in points allowed after leading the league in that category in 1990. Handley, who had become unpopular with both players and fans, was fired after the end of the regular season.

== Dan Reeves takes over: 1993–1996 ==
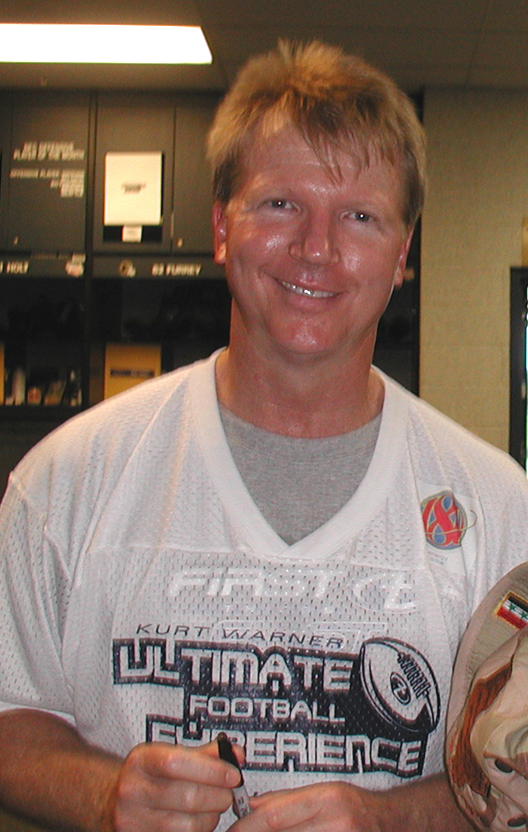
Phil Simms (pictured in 2004) quarterbacked the Giants for 15 seasons. Co-owner Wellington Mara said the day the team decided to cut Simms to save salary cap space was one "of overwhelming sadness."

Handley was replaced by former Denver Broncos head coach Dan Reeves, who led the Broncos to three Super Bowls in four years, one against the Giants. After his dismissal from the Broncos, Reeves took the unusual step of lobbying for the job. After being rebuffed by a number of candidates, George Young was pleased that someone with Reeves's credentials wanted the job.

In 1993, Reeves' impact was immediate. As Parcells had done in 1984, Reeves named Simms his starting quarterback. The defense returned to form, and allowed more than 20 points once all season. With two regular season games left, the Giants were 11–3 and appeared poised for a first-round playoff bye. They were upset by a Phoenix Cardinals team, who came into the game with just five wins, 17–6, in the next-to-last week of the season, setting up a winner–take–all contest against the Dallas Cowboys in the final regular season game. Though the Giants played well, it was Emmitt Smith's memorable performance with a separated shoulder that led the Cowboys to a 16–13 overtime win, giving the Cowboys a sweep of the season series and home-field advantage throughout the NFC Playoffs. Despite the loss, the Giants made the playoffs as a Wild Card and won their first-round game, 17–10 over the Minnesota Vikings. However, they were defeated by the San Francisco 49ers 44–3 in the divisional playoffs. Simms played in all 16 games, completing nearly 62% of his passes, and threw for over 3,000 yards and 15 touchdowns. Simms, Hampton, offensive linemen Jumbo Elliot and center Bart Oates made the 1994 Pro Bowl, and Reeves was named Coach of the Year by the Associated Press. After the season, Lawrence Taylor and Phil Simms, the two biggest figures of the late 1980s and early 1990s Giants teams, retired.

Before the 1994 season, Reeves named Dave Brown, who had been a #1 supplemental draft choice in 1992, the Giants starting quarterback. Though Brown led the Giants to wins in their first three games, they lost their next seven. The Giants recovered to win their last six games of the season, but missed the playoffs. During the winning streak, they never allowed more than 20 points in a game.

The Giants regressed to a 5–11 record in 1995. Much of the blame for the Giants' poor performance was placed on Brown. He put up lackluster numbers for the second straight year. Though the Giants defense still played well, and young players like Michael Strahan and Jessie Armstead began to emerge, the Giants inspired tepid interest league-wide and sent no players to the Pro Bowl for the second straight year.

The Giants had another losing season in 1996, finishing 6–10. Though Brown again started every game for the Giants, he turned in one of the worst seasons of any starting quarterback in the NFL, throwing for just 12 touchdowns against 20 interceptions. The Giants' offense was one of the worst in the NFL and, unlike in previous years, the defense was unable to carry the team. After missing the playoffs for three consecutive seasons, Reeves was fired.

== Jim Fassel era ==
=== 1997–1999 ===
The Giants hired former Arizona Cardinals offensive coordinator Jim Fassel as their head coach before the 1997 season. With the team's offense floundering once again and a 2–3 record after five games, Fassel turned to inexperienced Danny Kanell as the starting quarterback over Dave Brown. The Giants experienced a resurgent season, finishing 10–5–1 and winning the NFC East. They hosted a first–round playoff game against the Minnesota Vikings. The Giants led the Vikings for most of the game, including 22–13 in the 4th quarter, but following a muffed onside kick, the Vikings booted a last-second field goal to win 23–22. Following the season, George Young left the Giants. He was replaced by Ernie Accorsi, a veteran general manager who had successful stints building the Baltimore Colts and Cleveland Browns.

The Giants regressed to an 8–8 record in 1998. The strength of the team during the season was their defense, which featured two Pro Bowlers in Armstead and Strahan. However, the offense continued to struggle. Dave Brown had been released before the season and replaced by Kanell and Kent Graham. However, neither quarterback provided Pro Bowl-caliber play. Before the 1999 season, the Giants signed quarterback Kerry Collins. Collins had been the first–ever draft choice of the Carolina Panthers, and in his second season, led them to the NFC Championship game. However, problems with alcohol abuse, conflicts with his teammates, and questions about his character led to his release from the Panthers. Although many people questioned the wisdom of Accorsi and the Giants giving Collins a $16.9 million contract, Accorsi was confident in Collins' abilities.

In 1999, Tiki Barber emerged as a solid pass–catching running back, catching 66 passes. Wide receiver Amani Toomer also had a breakout season, accumulating over 1,100 yards receiving and six touchdowns, and Ike Hilliard finished just shy of 1,000 yards receiving. The defense rebounded, ranking 11th in the league, and Armstead and Strahan again were selected to the Pro Bowl. Though the Giants stood at 7–6 and poised for a playoff berth, they lost their final three games to miss the playoffs.

=== 2000: Super Bowl season ===
The 2000 season was considered a make-or-break year for Fassel. The conventional wisdom was that Fassel needed to have a strong year and a playoff appearance to save his job. After back-to-back losses at home against the St. Louis Rams and Detroit Lions, the Giants fell to 7–4, and their playoff prospects were in question. At a press conference following the loss to Detroit, Fassel guaranteed that "[t]his team is going to the playoffs." The Giants responded, winning the next week's game against Arizona and the rest of their regular season games to finish the season 12–4 and earn a bye and home-field advantage as the NFC's top seed.

The Giants won their first playoff game against the Philadelphia Eagles, 20–10, and then defeated the Minnesota Vikings 41–0 in the NFC Championship game. They advanced to play the Baltimore Ravens in Super Bowl XXXV. Though the Giants kept the game close early and went into halftime down only 10–0, the Ravens dominated the second half. The Ravens' defense harassed Kerry Collins all game long, and he had one of the worst games in Super Bowl history. Collins completed only 15 of 39 passes for 112 yards and four interceptions, and the Ravens won the game, 34–7. The Giants' only score came on a Ron Dixon 97-yard kickoff return for a touchdown late in the 3rd quarter. On the ensuing kickoff, the Ravens' Jermaine Lewis scored a touchdown on an 84-yard return.

=== 2001–2003 ===
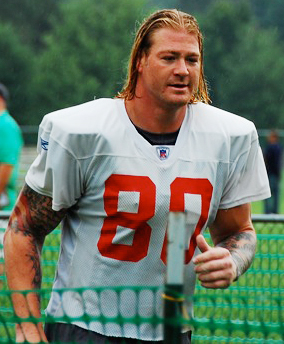
Tight end Jeremy Shockey was the Giants first round pick in 2002.

The Giants were unable to build on their Super Bowl appearance. They ended the 2001 season 7–9 and out of the playoffs for the third time in four seasons. Collins continued his success as the team's quarterback, throwing for over 3,700 yards and 19 touchdowns, and Strahan broke the NFL record by recording 22.5 sacks In 2002, Collins had one of the best seasons of his career, throwing for over 4,000 yards, and Barber rushed for 1,386 yards and caught 69 passes for 597 yards. Rookie tight end Jeremy Shockey caught 74 passes for a total of 894 yards. The team started 6–6, but made the playoffs as a wild card by winning their last four regular season games.

In the wild card playoffs, the Giants built a 38–14 3rd-quarter lead against the San Francisco 49ers. However, the 49ers rallied, scoring a field goal, and three touchdowns to take a 39–38 lead with a minute left in the game. Collins then drove the Giants down to the 49ers 23-yard line with six seconds left, setting up a potential game winning 41-yard field goal attempt for Matt Bryant. On the final play of the game, 40-year-old long snapper Trey Junkin — who had just been signed for this playoff game — snapped the ball low, and punter Matt Allen could not spot the ball properly for the attempt. Allen picked the ball up and threw an unsuccessful pass downfield to offensive lineman Rich Seubert as time expired, and the Giants lost 39–38.

The Giants started the 2003 season 4–4, but lost their final eight games. With two games remaining in the season, Jim Fassel requested a meeting with team management, and asked, if he was to be fired, that they do so now rather than wait until the end of the season. Management complied with his request, formally firing Fassel on (or around) December 17, 2003, but allowing him to coach the team's final two games.

== Eli Manning era: 2004–2019 ==
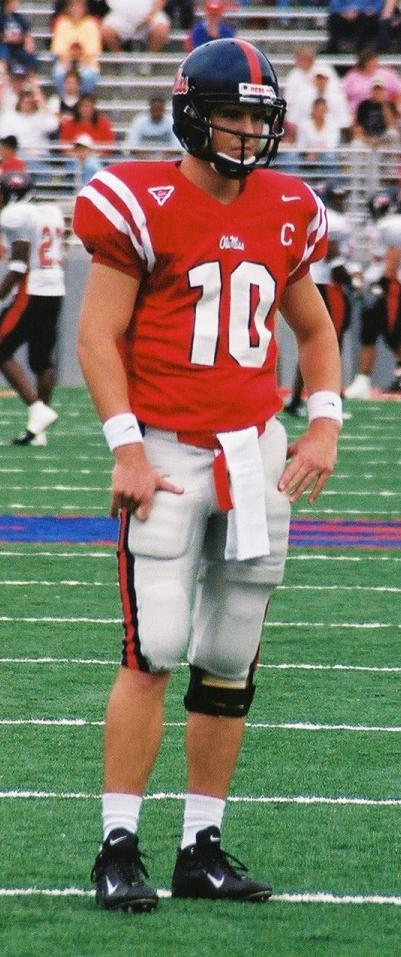
Coming out of Ole Miss, quarterback Eli Manning was the first overall selection in the 2004 NFL draft

=== 2004–2006 ===
After a brief search, Ernie Accorsi hired former Jacksonville Jaguars coach Tom Coughlin to be the Giants' head coach. Coughlin was considered a disciplinarian, in contrast to the departed Fassel, whose lenient style was criticized in his final years with the club. Accorsi coveted quarterback Eli Manning, brother of Peyton and son of Archie, in the 2004 NFL draft. Manning had indicated before the draft that he did not want to play for the San Diego Chargers, who held the top pick. The Chargers drafted him nonetheless, and then traded him to the Giants for their first round picks in 2004 and 2005. The Giants released Kerry Collins, who was unhappy with a backup role, and signed veteran quarterback Kurt Warner. The plan was for Warner to be the starter, while the team groomed Manning to ultimately take over the job. After losing to the Philadelphia Eagles in the 2004 season opener, the Giants, with Warner at quarterback, won five of their next six games, making them 5–2. After losing two close games, to the Chicago Bears and Arizona Cardinals, to drop to 5–4, Coughlin announced that Manning would start the rest of the season. Manning struggled, and the Giants did not score more than 14 points in their next four games. He performed better later in the season, but the Giants finished the season 6–10. Barber established a career-high in rushing with 1,518 yards. He also had 52 catches and a total of 15 touchdowns.

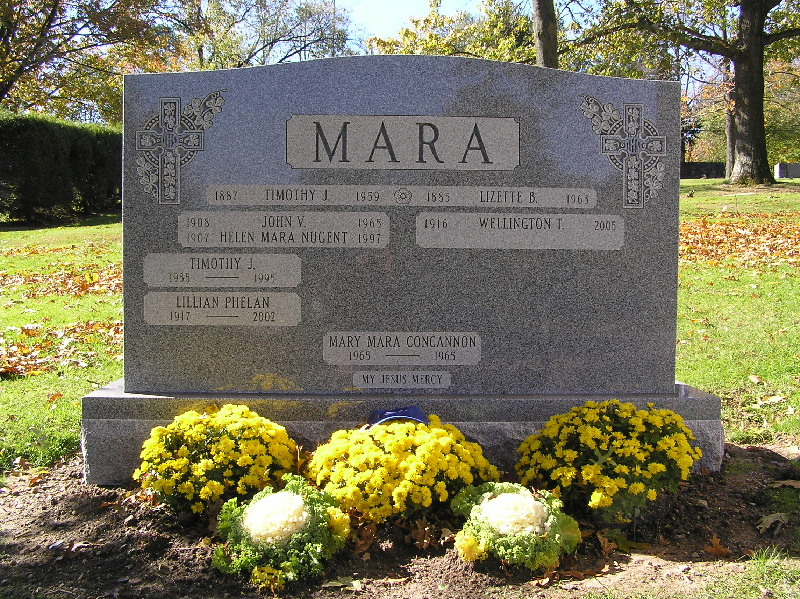
Wellington Mara's gravesite. Mara co-owned the team from 1959 until his death in 2005.

The Giants started 4–2 in 2005. Then, on October 25, patriarch Wellington Mara died after a brief illness at the age of 89. Mara had been involved with the Giants since he was nine years old, when he worked for them as a ball boy. Except a tour of duty in the military during World War II, Mara spent his entire adult life with the team. He was beloved by many of the players, and was noted for making an effort to get to know each of them. The Giants dedicated their next game to Mara, and defeated the Washington Redskins 36–0. Just twenty days after Mara's death, on November 15, the other Giants Executive Officer, Bob Tisch, died at the age of 79. The Giants honored Tisch by defeating the Philadelphia Eagles 27–17 in their next game. Barber set a new team single-game rushing record with 220 yards, and the team's single-season record with 1,860 yards in a victory over the Kansas City Chiefs. The Giants finished 11–5 and hosted the Carolina Panthers in the wild card playoffs, but lost 23–0.

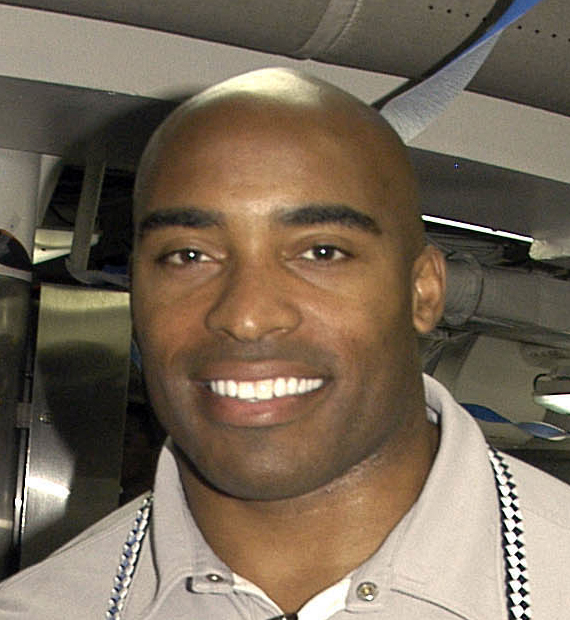
Running back Tiki Barber set Giants single season and single game rushing records in 2005.

The Giants regressed to an 8–8 record in 2006. The season was characterized by inconsistent play, criticism of the coaching by the media and players, and Manning's struggles. They won five straight following a 1–2 start, giving them a two-game lead in the NFC East, but they lost six of their last seven games, and the players publicly clashed with Coughlin. One of the team's worst losses was a 24–21 defeat to the Tennessee Titans, in which the team surrendered a 21-point 4th-quarter lead. Following a season-ending win against the Washington Redskins, the Giants made the playoffs as a wild card despite their record, but were defeated 23–20 by the Philadelphia Eagles.

Barber led the Giants with 1,662 yards rushing and over 2,000 yards from scrimmage, Manning threw for 3,244 yards and 24 touchdowns, and Jeremy Shockey led the team in receptions. Defensively, the team struggled against the pass (28th in the league) and gaining a consistent pass rush (tied for 23rd in the league in sacks).

=== 2007: Third Super Bowl Championship ===
In 2007, the Giants made the playoffs for the third consecutive season. In a September game against the Philadelphia Eagles, they tied the NFL record for most sacks in a game by sacking Philadelphia quarterback Donovan McNabb 12 times, with Osi Umenyiora recording six of those sacks. They became the third NFL franchise to win 600 games when they defeated the Atlanta Falcons 31–10 in October. That same month, they also played in the NFL's first regular season game outside of North America, in London's Wembley Stadium, where they beat the Miami Dolphins 13–10. They ended the regular season 10–6 and defeated the Tampa Bay Buccaneers 24–14 in the first round of the playoffs, earning Manning and Coughlin their first playoff victories with the Giants. The next week, the Giants won their ninth consecutive road game by beating the top-seeded Dallas Cowboys 21–17. In the NFC Championship Game, Lawrence Tynes kicked an overtime field goal to give them a 23–20 road victory over the Green Bay Packers.

In Super Bowl XLII, the Giants defeated the previously unbeaten New England Patriots 17–14. The signature play of the game came on a 3rd-and-5, with the Giants on their own 44-yard line, down 14–10, and 1:15 remaining in the 4th quarter. Manning dropped back to pass, but was surrounded by New England pass rushers. Escaping three tackles, he threw a long pass to David Tyree, who caught the ball against his own helmet, while being covered by Patriots safety Rodney Harrison. Four plays later, Manning threw the game-winning touchdown pass to Plaxico Burress with 35 seconds left. Manning won the game's MVP award by completing 19 of 34 passes for 255 yards and two touchdowns. The Giants' win is considered one of the biggest upsets in Super Bowl history.

Michael Strahan retired after the game as the team's all-time leader in sacks.

=== 2008–2016 ===
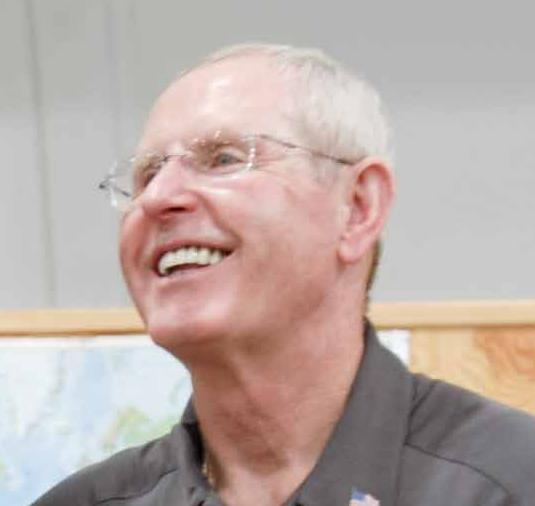
Tom Coughlin, former Giants head coach.

The Giants' 12–4 record in 2008 earned them the number one seed in the NFC and a first-round bye in the playoffs. They won 11 of their first 12 games before stumbling to lose four of their last five, including a 23–11 loss to the Philadelphia Eagles in the NFC Divisional Playoffs. Manning threw for 3,238 yards, 21 touchdowns, and 10 interceptions, and was named to the 2009 Pro Bowl after the season. Other standouts included Brandon Jacobs and Derrick Ward who both rushed for 1,000 yards (who helped the Giants lead the NFL in rushing yards); Justin Tuck, who led the team with 12 sacks; and Antonio Pierce, who was the team's leading tackler. The Giants featured a balanced offense with no receiver topping 600 receiving yards.

The Giants won their first five games in 2009, but lost their next four. After beating the Atlanta Falcons 34–31 in overtime, they lost badly to the Denver Broncos 26–6 on Thanksgiving Day. They defeated the Dallas Cowboys 31–24 in Week 13, then lost 45–38 to the Philadelphia Eagles the next week. At 8–6, they still had a chance to make the playoffs, but losses to the Carolina Panthers and the Minnesota Vikings to finish the season left them out of the playoffs at 8–8.

In the spring of 2010, construction on the New Meadowlands Stadium (now MetLife Stadium) was completed, and the Giants and Jets opened it in August with their annual preseason game. In the 2010 regular season, they won their home opener against the Carolina Panthers, 31–18, avenging their late-season loss from the previous year. They went on the road to play the Indianapolis Colts in the second "Manning Bowl" in Week 2. Peyton outplayed Eli (who threw for just 161 yards) in a 38–14 Colts victory. Discipline became a growing problem for the Giants during the season. In the Colts game, Jacobs threw his helmet into the stands, and in the next game, offensive tackle David Diehl ripped off the helmet of Tennessee Titans cornerback Cortland Finnegan.

During the 2011 preseason, the Giants lost tight end Kevin Boss, wide receiver Steve Smith, guard Rich Seubert, linebacker Keith Bulluck, wide receiver Derek Hagan, and Pro Bowl center Shaun O'Hara to free agency. However, the 2011 season also saw the emerging of second-year wide receiver Victor Cruz and second-year tight end Jake Ballard. The Giants opened the season against the Washington Redskins on the 10th anniversary of the September 11th attacks, with both New York City and Washington being a target of the attacks. The Redskins beat the Giants 28–14, but the Giants won their next three games, against the St. Louis Rams, Philadelphia Eagles, and Arizona Cardinals. After a loss against the Seattle Seahawks, they went on another three-game winning streak. A key victory was an upset of the New England Patriots 24–20 at Gillette Stadium. The victory ended the Patriots' NFL record home-game winning streak, after a touchdown pass from Manning to Ballard with 15 seconds left. However, the Giants lost their next three games, before regaining their position atop the NFC East with a tightly contested 37–34 win over the Dallas Cowboys on December 11. After splitting their next two games against the Redskins and New York Jets, a victory over the Cowboys in the last game of the regular season clinched a postseason appearance for the Giants.

In the first round of the playoffs, the Giants defeated the Atlanta Falcons 24–2. After giving up an early safety in the first half, Eli Manning threw three consecutive touchdowns. Running backs Ahmad Bradshaw and Brandon Jacobs combined for 172 yards rushing, a season-high for the Giants. With the victory, the Giants advanced to the second round against the top-seeded Green Bay Packers.

The following week, the Giants defeated the Packers 37–20. Manning threw for 330 yards and three touchdowns, two of them to wide receiver Hakeem Nicks. This earned the Giants a spot in the NFC Championship Game against the San Francisco 49ers. They won that game in overtime, 20–17 with Lawrence Tynes scoring the game-winning field goal as he did four years earlier in the same game against the Green Bay Packers.

The New York Giants won Super Bowl XLVI against the New England Patriots by a score of 21–17. The winning touchdown drive began with a 38-yard reception by wide receiver Mario Manningham. As in Super Bowl XLII, Eli Manning was the game's MVP, defeating Tom Brady for a second time in the Super Bowl.

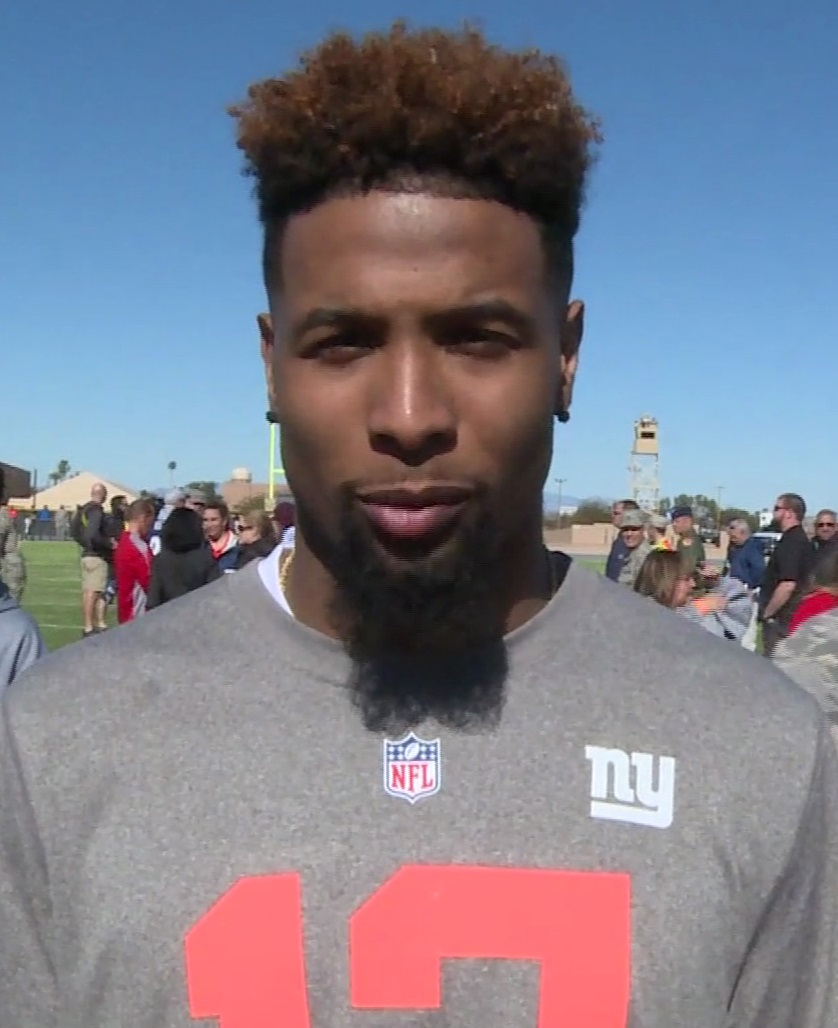
Odell Beckham Jr., the Giants first round draft pick in 2014

Despite winning 2 Super Bowl championships in 5 years, the 2012 (9–7), 2013 (7–9), and 2014 (6–10) seasons saw the Giants missing the playoffs 3 years in a row. A bright spot of the 2014 season was rookie Odell Beckham Jr., who burst onto the scene catching 91 passes on 132 targets, for 1,305 yards and 12 touchdowns, and in doing so winning Offensive Rookie of the Year.

The Giants struggled in 2015, finishing 6–10 again and third in the NFC East due to the Giants defense blowing the lead in the final minutes in 6 of their 10 games. Despite their defensive struggles, quarterback Eli Manning threw for a career-high 35 touchdown passes and also set career highs in attempts and completions. After the season, head coach Tom Coughlin resigned after 12 seasons.

In 2016 with new head coach Ben McAdoo, the Giants began a rocky 2–3 start after starting 2–0. The Giants rebounded their rocky start and went on a 6-game winning streak for the first time since 2010 which lasted from Week 6 to Week 13. In that span, the Giants improved from their last two season. The Giants clinched a 10 win season for the first time since 2010 with their Week 15 win over the Detroit Lions. Despite losing to the Philadelphia Eagles in Week 16, the Giants clinched a playoff trip when the Tampa Bay Buccaneers lost to the New Orleans Saints on Christmas Eve ending the Giants' 5 year playoff drought. They eventually finished 11–5 and second in the NFC East, but lost to the Green Bay Packers in the Wild Card round.

=== 2017–2018: Major struggles ===
Going into the 2017 season the Giants had high expectations to challenge for the NFC East title against the Dallas Cowboys. The Giants however would get to an awful start going 0–5 with major injuries to the team on both sides of the team including losing Odell Beckham Jr. for the rest of the season with an ankle injury. The Giants would get their first win of the season in week 6 against the Denver Broncos. However, the Giants would proceed to lose five of their next six games and after a loss to the Oakland Raiders in week 13, head coach Ben McAdoo along with general manager Jerry Reese were fired. Steve Spagnuolo would be named interim head coach for the remainder of the season. The Giants would end up finishing the season 3–13 which is their worst record since 2003 (4–12).

For the 2018 season the Giants hired Pat Shurmur as their next head coach who was the offensive coordinator for the Minnesota Vikings and last head coached for the Cleveland Browns in 2012. The Giants would draft with their second overall pick in the 2018 NFL Draft running back Saquon Barkley from Penn State. The Giants would struggle throughout the season starting 1–7 before their bye week, but would rally to win four of their next five games. They would end up finishing the season 5–11 and miss the playoffs for the second consecutive season. Despite the losing season, Barkley was seen as a bright spot for their offense and was named 2018 NFC Offensive Rookie of the Year.

== Post Eli Manning era: 2019–present ==
=== 2019: Daniel Jones' rookie season ===
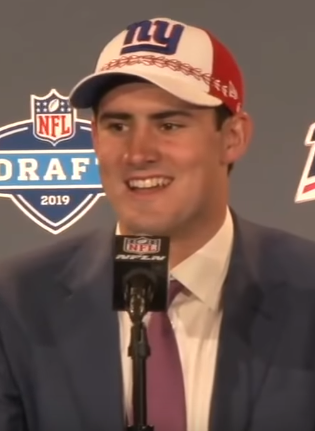
Daniel Jones, the Giants first round draft pick (sixth overall) in 2019.

During the 2019 off-season the Giants would trade Odell Beckham Jr. to the Cleveland Browns for a first-round pick, a third-round pick, and safety Jabrill Peppers. The Giants would draft with their sixth overall pick in the 2019 NFL Draft quarterback Daniel Jones from Duke. Eli Manning would start the first two games of the season, losing both. Head coach Pat Shurmur made the decision to bench Manning and replaced him with Jones as quarterback. In his first career start in week 3, Jones would rally the team in a comeback win against the Tampa Bay Buccaneers for his first win. Jones would also win his first divisional game against the Washington Redskins, evening the team's record at 2–2. Despite the promising start, the Giants would then lose their next nine games, and finished the season with a record of 4–12. Shurmur was fired after the season.

=== 2020 ===
2020 was the first year since 2003 that Eli Manning wasn't on the roster, as he retired following the 2019 season. For the 2020 season, the Giants hired former Patriots special teams coordinator Joe Judge to be their new head coach. The Giants, however, lost their first five games, three of which were decided by one score. Their first win came at the hands of the Washington Football Team, as the Giants held off a late rally by Washington to win 20–19. They would lose their next two games against the Eagles and the Buccaneers by one and two points, respectively. They would then win four straight games, including a 17–12 upset over the Seattle Seahawks, and sat at 5–7, tied with the Washington Football Team for best with the division, but the Giants owned the tiebreaker due to a head-to-head sweep. The Giants proceeded to lose their next three games by two or more scores. A 23–19 Week 17 victory over the Dallas Cowboys put the Giants at 6–10 and in contention for the NFC East title. All they needed to happen was for the 6–9 Washington Football Team to lose to the 4–10–1 Philadelphia Eagles that night, and the Giants would be in. However, the Eagles would end up being criticized for tanking, allowing Washington to get away with a 20–14 victory, eliminating the Giants from the playoffs and from contention of claiming the worst record in NFL history for a team that qualified for the playoffs (the worst record was 7–9 by the 2010 Seattle Seahawks and the aforementioned Washington Football Team).

=== 2021 ===
The Giants tanked during the 2021 season. The Giants started 0–3, with the last two games against the Washington Football Team and the Atlanta Falcons being lost due to game-winning kicks. They were unable to improve on their record, and despite three midseason wins which allowed the Giants a chance to comeback at 3–6, they won only one of their next 8 games, and fell to 4–13, causing them to miss the playoffs and fail to meet their record from the previous year. Following the season, Dave Gettleman announced his retirement and Joe Judge was fired.

=== 2022–2025: Brian Daboll era ===
In the offseason, the Giants hired Bills front office assistant Joe Schoen to become their general manager, who in turn hired Bills offensive coordinator Brian Daboll to become the 22nd head coach in franchise history.

=== 2022 season ===
The Giants started 2–0 for the first time since 2016 and had their best start since 2008. The Giants surpassed their 2021 win total after a Week 6 win over the Baltimore Ravens. With a win over the Washington Commanders in Week 15, they guaranteed their first non-losing season since 2016, and their first season since 2009 in which they never had a losing record at any stage. Despite struggling in the second half of the season, the Giants clinched a playoff spot and a winning record for the first time since 2016 with a Week 17 win over the Indianapolis Colts and finished 9–7–1.

As the sixth seed in the NFC, the Giants beat the Minnesota Vikings 31–24 in the Wild Card round, getting their first playoff win since Super Bowl XLVI in 2012. However, the Giants' season would end the following week with a 38–7 loss to the division rival and eventual NFC champion Philadelphia Eagles in the Divisional Round.

=== 2023 season ===
The 2023 season would be less successful as they had failed to improve on their 9–7–1 record from the previous season. A historically poor offensive line and numerous injuries, particularly losing starting quarterback Daniel Jones to a torn ACL in a Week 9 loss against the Raiders, plagued the team throughout the year. One highlight featured the Giants trailing 20–0 at halftime against the Arizona Cardinals. The Giants would later make an improbable comeback to win the game 31–28. They would later finish at 6–11. This was their final season with Saquon Barkley, as he would sign a three-year deal with the division rival Eagles during the 2024 offseason.

=== 2024 season ===
In the 2024 season, the Giants deteriorated further to a 3–14 record. The season was plagued by poor quarterback play, numerous key injuries (particularly losing starting tackle Andrew Thomas to a Lisfranc injury), and poor pass protection similar to the previous season. The Giants also had a 10-game losing streak and were swept by all of their division rivals, both for the first time in franchise history. This was the final season with quarterback Daniel Jones on the team as he was released on November 22, a few days after being benched in favor of Tommy DeVito due to his poor performance. The ACL tear that ended his previous season as well as the return of several neck injuries played a significant factor in limiting his passing abilities. There were a few bright spots for the Giants, such as their rookie class, which was led by wide receiver Malik Nabers. Nabers broke the Giants franchise record and NFL rookie record for receptions in a season. Another bright spot was the Week 17 home game against the Indianapolis Colts, being one of the Giants best offensive performances in years as they won 45–33, preventing the Giants from becoming the first team ever to lose nine home games in a season (since the NFL expanded to 17 games in 2021) and going winless at home for the first time since 1974. The win also eliminated the Colts from playoff contention.

=== 2025 season ===
The Giants had the 3rd pick in the 2025 draft, which they used on Penn State linebacker Abdul Carter, considered one of the best prospects in the draft. They later traded for the 25th pick which they used on Ole Miss quarterback Jaxson Dart, as well as selecting Arizona State running back Cam Skattebo in the fourth round. Following a week 10 loss to the Chicago Bears, Brian Daboll was fired as head coach, with offensive coordinator Mike Kafka taking over interim head coach duties for the rest of the season. The Giants finished with a 4-13 record, missing the playoffs for a third consecutive year.

=== 2026–present: John Harbaugh era ===
The Giants hired John Harbaugh as the 23rd head coach in franchise history on January 17, 2026. Harbaugh was previously the head coach of the Baltimore Ravens for 18 seasons before being fired at the end of the 2025 season.

== Timeline ==
Season by season timeline of the New York Giants franchise including the team name, changes of Home Field, Postseason Championships Seasons, and coaches throughout the years.

== See also ==
- Financial history of the New York Giants
- List of New York Giants seasons
- Logos and Uniforms of the New York Giants
- List of New York Giants players

== Sources ==
- Axthelm, Pete. "The Giants go to Jersey, or, Father Mara knows best." New York, New York Media, LLC Vol. 4, No. 44 November 1, 1971, issue, ISSN 0028-7369 (available online)
- Buckley, James Jr. Great Moments in Football. Milwaukee: Gareth Stevens, 2000 ISBN 0-8368-5360-1
- Carroll, John Martin. Grange and the Rise of Modern Football. Urbana: University of Illinois Press, 1999 ISBN 0-252-07166-2
- Cavanaugh, Jack. Giants Among Men: How Robustelli, Huff, Gifford, and the Giants Made New York a Football Town and Changed the NFL. New York: Random House, 2008 ISBN 978-1-4000-6717-6
- Eskenazi, Gerald. There Were Giants in Those Days. New York: Grosset & Dunlap 1976 ISBN 0-448-12451-3
- Gottehrer, Barry. The Giants of New York, the history of professional football's most fabulous dynasty. New York: G. P. Putnam's Sons, 1963 OCLC 1356301
- Neft, David S., Cohen, Richard M., and Korch, Rick. The Complete History of Professional Football from 1892 to the Present. New York: St. Martin's Press, 1994 ISBN 0-312-11435-4
- Pellowski, Steve. The Little Giant Book of Football Facts. New York: Sterling Publishing, 2005 ISBN 1-4027-2390-3
- Pervin, Lawrence A. Football's New York Giants: A History. McFarland 2009 ISBN 0-7864-4268-9
- Schwartz, John. Tales from the New York Giants Sideline. Champaign: Sports Publishing LLC, 2004 ISBN 1-58261-758-9
- Sprechman, Jordan and Shannon, Bill. This Day in New York Sports. Illinois: Sports Publishing LLC. 1998 ISBN 1-57167-254-0
- Walsh, Chris. New York Giants Football: Guide and Record Book. Illinois: Triumph Books 2009 ISBN 1-60078-189-6
