= Frank Filchock =

American football player and coach (1916–1994)

- Filchock in 1946

No. 55, 30, 40, 64
- Positions: Quarterback, tailback

Personal information
- Born: October 8, 1916; Crucible, Pennsylvania, U.S.
- Died: June 20, 1994 (aged 77); Washington County, Oregon, U.S.
- Listed height: 5 ft 10 in (1.78 m)
- Listed weight: 193 lb (88 kg)

Career information
- High school: Redstone (Republic, Pennsylvania)
- College: Indiana (1934-1937)
- NFL draft: 1938: 2nd round, 14th overall pick

Career history

Playing
- Pittsburgh Pirates (1938); Washington Redskins (1938–1941, 1944–1945); New York Giants (1946); Hamilton Tigers (1947–1948); Montreal Alouettes (1949–1950); Baltimore Colts (1950); Edmonton Eskimos (1951–1952); Saskatchewan Roughriders (1953)

Coaching
- Hamilton Tigers (1947) Head coach; Montreal Alouettes (1949-1950) Assistant coach; Edmonton Eskimos (1951) Assistant coach; Edmonton Eskimos (1952) Head coach; Saskatchewan Roughriders (1953–1957) Head coach; Sarnia Golden Bears (1958); Calgary Stampeders (1959) Backfield coach; Denver Broncos (1960–1961) Head coach; Quebec Rifles (1964) Defense coach

Awards and highlights
- Grey Cup champion (1949); Imperial Oil Trophy (1948); Lionel Conacher Award (1949); 2× First-team All-Pro (1939, 1946); 2× Pro Bowl (1939, 1941); 2× NFL passing touchdowns leader (1939, 1944); NFL passer rating leader (1944); NFL completion percentage leader (1944); NFL record: Longest touchdown pass: 99 yards (tied)

Career NFL statistics
- Passing attempts: 677
- Passing completions: 342
- Completion percentage: 50.5%
- Passing yards: 4,921
- TD–INT: 47-79
- Rushing yards: 1,478
- Rushing average: 3.1
- Rushing touchdowns: 7
- Stats at Pro Football Reference

Head coaching record
- Career: 7–20–1 (.268)
- Coaching profile at Pro Football Reference

Frank Joseph Filchock (October 8, 1916 – June 20, 1994) was an American professional football player and coach. As a consequence of a famous scandal regarding the 1946 NFL Championship Game, he was suspended by the National Football League (NFL) from 1947 to 1950 for associating with gamblers.

== Early life ==
Born in 1916 in the small Pennsylvania mining town of Crucible, Filchock was a star player at Redstone Township High School and later at Indiana University.

== Professional career ==
=== Pittsburgh Pirates ===
After graduating from university, he became the second pick of the Pittsburgh Pirates in the second round of the 1938 NFL draft. The Pirates' first first-round draft choice that year was Byron "Whizzer" White of Colorado, who later became a U.S. Supreme Court judge. Filchock appeared in six games for the Pirates in 1938, and then was sold to the Washington Redskins.

=== Washington Redskins ===
At Washington, he appeared in six more games in the 1938 season, as understudy to Sammy Baugh. He remained with the Redskins through the 1941 season, part of the time alternating quarters with Baugh. During this period of alternation, the two were known as "Slingin' Sam" and "Flingin' Frank".

On October 15, 1939, Filchock threw the first 99-yard touchdown pass in NFL history, to Andy Farkas, in a game against his old team, the Pirates. This set a record for longest play from scrimmage, a record that can only be tied, not broken. In 1939 and 1944, he led the league in touchdown passes. In the latter year, he also won the league passing championship, just edging out teammate Baugh.

In 1942 and 1943, Filchock was out of professional football and on active duty with the United States Navy. While in the service, he played for Georgia Pre-Flight, where he was named to the U.P. All-Service team at tailback. In 1944, he returned to Washington, D.C., where the Redskins had just switched to the T-formation.

=== New York Giants ===
After the 1945 season, coach Steve Owen of the New York Giants asked owner Tim Mara to get Filchock to serve as passer in Owen's A-Formation offense. Mara made the trade with the Redskins, but actually signing Filchock was more difficult. Not only did Mara end up exceeding his traditional salary ceiling, but he also agreed to the first multi-year contract in Giants' history. Filchock got a reported $35,000 for three seasons. Even such Giant greats as Benny Friedman, Mel Hein and coach Steve Owen had never received multi-year contracts (Owen, in fact, coached the Giants for 22 years without a contract).

In spite of a painful arm injury, Filchock had a good first year in New York, passing for 1,262 yards and 12 touchdowns. He ran for another 371 yards and was chosen an all-pro halfback and the most valuable player for the Giants. His passing threat was what the Giants needed to make Owen's offense work, and Filchock led the team from a 3–6–1 record in 1945 to 7–3–1 and first place in the Eastern Conference in 1946. This set up the 1946 NFL title game with the Chicago Bears, scheduled for Sunday, December 15.

==== The scandal ====
Hours before game time, a story broke on radio that gamblers had attempted to fix the game—and that Filchock and another Giant back, Merle Hapes, were involved. It later developed New York City mayor Bill O'Dwyer, NFL commissioner Bert Bell, police commissioner Arthur Wallander and Giants' owner Tim Mara had met in the mayor's office to assess the situation on the day before the game. O'Dwyer also wanted to meet with the players, and Filchock and Hapes were brought to the mayor's residence later that day. At this meeting, Hapes admitted being approached, while Filchock denied it.

At 2 a.m. Sunday, only twelve hours before game time, the district attorney's office announced that Filchock and Hapes had been offered $2,500 each plus the profits from a $1,000 bet that Chicago would win by more than ten points. The players also had been offered off-season jobs supposed to bring them another $15,000.

Bell announced that although the police had concluded no player had taken a bribe, the league would conduct its own investigation of the offers. The championship game would go ahead as scheduled. Filchock, who during the meeting with the mayor had denied being approached, would be allowed to play in the game. Hapes, who had admitted his failure to report the bribe attempt, would not be allowed to play.

Thus the Giants went into the game minus one of their backfield stars and with a cloud hanging over another. When Filchock was introduced, he was roundly booed. He reportedly played hard, suffering a broken nose, but the Giants lost to the Bears 24–14. This was the precise betting line of the gamblers; they neither won nor lost their bets.

Filchock played 50 minutes and was responsible for all of the Giants' scoring, throwing touchdown passes to Frank Liebel and Steve Filipowicz. He completed 9 of 26 passes for 128 yards but had six of his passes intercepted to become the first quarterback to throw six interceptions in a playoff game; only three other players have thrown six interceptions in a playoff game since Filchock. The winning players each received $1,975.82, the losers $1,295.57. Both Filchock and Hapes received full shares.

The day after the game, the Associated Press reported:

Alvin J. Paris, a self-styled 'big bettor' on athletic contests, was arraigned on a bribery charge, accused of having offered Merle Hapes and Frank Filchock, Giant backfield men, $2,500 each to agree not to play their best in the championship contest. Police exonerated both players but Hapes was kept out of the game at the order of Bert Bell, commissioner of the league. Filchock, the key man in the Giants' backfield, played virtually all the game.

At the NFL meeting the day after the game, Bell became worried he was about to be fired when the owners asked him to step outside. When he returned, he was advised his contract was changed to a five-year pact at $30,000 per year.

==== The aftermath ====
Alvin Paris was convicted of bribery on January 8, 1947. The same day, Bell suspended both of the players, even though the judge in the Paris trial had found that "Frank Filchock was not an accomplice, and was in fact an unfortunate victim of circumstances."

After Paris's trial, three other gamblers were indicted on bribery and conspiracy charges. Paris had not taken the stand in his own defense, but he was the prosecution's star witness at the second trial. He testified that $500 was bet for each of the two players on the Giants to win their final regular-season game, against the Redskins. This was presumably without the players' knowledge. Paris paid them the proceeds after the game. According to him, Hapes accepted the money without argument, but Filchock required some persuasion. Paris also claimed that Hapes was willing to throw the championship game and that Filchock considered the offer overnight before rejecting it.

Hapes and Filchock also testified. They strongly denied ever receiving any money from Paris or ever considering any bribery offers.

The three conspirators in the second trial were convicted and received sentences of five to ten years. Paris's sentencing had been deferred until after the second trial. His testimony for the prosecution was taken into account, and he received only a one-year sentence. He was paroled after nine months.

Within 24 hours of the second verdict, Commissioner Bell extended the suspensions of Filchock and Hapes indefinitely. He did this, he said, because he had found the players "guilty of actions detrimental to the welfare of the National Football League and of professional football." This suspension applied not only to the NFL, but to all minor leagues associated with it. It did not apply to the new All-America Football Conference, but they were not about to pick up a player banned by the senior league for gambling connections. In effect, Filchock was banned from playing professional football in the United States.

When Filchock was asked about his plans, he replied "I haven't made any future plans simply because I never thought of being out of football. I still want to play football. I guess I always will."

== A second career in Canada ==
Although no team in the United States would hire Filchock, there was definite interest in Canada. Both the Hamilton Tigers and the Ottawa Rough Riders of the Interprovincial Rugby Football Union (or Big Four) made offers. Filchock accepted the Tigers' offer, and on August 13, 1947, he joined the team as a player-coach. Rumor put his salary at $7,000 for the season.

There was a problem, however. While Canadian football teams were still technically amateur, it was an open secret that all of the teams in Canada's two major leagues of the time—the Big Four and the Western Interprovincial Rugby Union (WIFU) paid their players. Lew Hayman, then in the process of building his new Montreal franchise, the Alouettes, but who had been involved in football in eastern Canada for many years, said in 1946:

In the days before the war, the players were paid off in the dark. Some of the Canadian players took money and others didn't, though nearly all of them accepted gifts. Imports from the United States were paid in cash — somewhere between $1,000 and $1,200 for a season. Today you have to pay them all, homebreds or imports, and you have to pay them about four times as much as you did before the war.

Everyone knew about this, but no one openly admitted it. For a high-profile, professional player like Filchock to play in the Big Four, pretenses would have to be dropped. Not everyone was willing to do that. Immediately after Filchock's signing, the Canadian Rugby Union, an umbrella organization for all levels of football throughout the Dominion, rejected his application for a player's certificate without comment, and the IRFU voted three to one that he could not play for Hamilton. Filchock was now blacklisted by every football league in the United States and Canada. Nevertheless, the Tigers were adamant: Filchock would play.

Frank played two exhibition games and four league games, all forfeit in advance, before the Big Four voted unanimously to allow him to play. The Tigers finished the 1947 season at 2–9–1.

Filchock was back with the Tigers for 1948, but in the meantime the team had resigned from the IRFU. Filchock's appearance in Big Four games had increased every team's attendance, but due to the lack of a gate-sharing program, the Tigers were able to benefit only up to the 12,000-seat capacity of their own stadium. Since they were paying Filchock's salary — undoubtedly the highest in the league — the Tigers felt they should receive some of the benefits from increased attendance at other parks. The three other teams did not see it that way, and the Tigers withdrew from the league.

Hamilton Wildcats, who had been playing senior football in the Ontario Rugby Football Union since 1943, promptly applied to fill the vacancy. They were accepted and the Tigers, a team dating back to 1869 and a founding member of the Big Four in 1907, were forced to play in the ORFU. In 1950, the Tigers and Wildcats finally merged as the Big Four's Hamilton Tiger-Cats. In 1948, Filchock was the MVP of the ORFU.

Filchock left the Tigers and returned to the Big Four in 1949, with Lew Hayman's Montreal Alouettes, at a salary reported to be $20,000 for two years. His earning power was now close to what it had been with the New York Giants. The Alouettes went 8–4 in the regular Big Four season, and then beat the ORFU champion Hamilton Tigers 40-0 for the Eastern Canadian title. In the Grey Cup, they met the Western champions, the Calgary Stampeders. The Stampeders had a 28–2–1 record over the last two seasons, including a 1948 Grey Cup victory over Ottawa. In the game, Filchock completed 11 of 19 pass attempts for 204 yards, one touchdown and one interception. He also intercepted three Calgary passes. The Alouettes won the game 28–15.

== Reinstatement ==
Hoping to end his NFL suspension, in July 1950, Filchock appeared at a hearing before Commissioner Bert Bell. He was accompanied by Léo Dandurand, Alouettes' president, and the two presented testimonials from businessmen, clergymen and sportsmen lauding his conduct. New York mayor Bill O'Dwyer and Assistant District Attorney George Monaghan also urged Bell to lift Filchock's suspension. Bell agreed to reinstate Filchock, while Hapes would be reinstated in 1954. In his announcement, he stated that Filchock "has at all times conducted himself in a manner reflecting the highest standards of sportsmanship... [and] has made a real contribution to the promotion and development of clean sports in Canada."

Jack Mara of the New York Giants (Filchock's previous NFL team) announced that he was "glad to hear that Frank has been reinstated... [but] we do not plan to make him an offer because we are stressing youth." Filchock was 33 years old at the time.

Filchock returned to Montreal and played the entire 1950 season there. The Alouettes finished out of the playoffs and he then signed with the Baltimore Colts, whose NFL season had not yet ended. The Colts folded after that season, and Filchock never played another down of football in the NFL.

== Final years in football ==
In 1951, Filchock played with the Edmonton Eskimos of the WIFU, and for the first time in Canada his statistics were officially compiled. Official record-keeping began in Western Canada only in 1951, and not until 1954 in the East. He was made player-coach of the Eskimos in 1952 and led them to the WIFU championship. He was named to the second-team Western all-stars the same year. The Eskimos fired him after they lost the 1952 Grey Cup, reportedly because he demanded more money.

== Coaching career ==
In 1953, Filchock moved to the Saskatchewan Roughriders, where he was both quarterback and head coach. He retired as a player after that season, he continued to coach at Regina through 1957, compiling a regular-season record of 41–35–4 with the team but never making it to the Grey Cup.

In 1958, he became head coach of the Sarnia Golden Bears of the ORFU. The team had an outstanding crop of imports, including quarterback and kicker Gino Cappelletti. It suffered only one defeat in ten games, and that by only a single point. Two playoff victories gave Filchock his second league championship as a coach. However, the ORFU was no longer considered a major league. Amateur teams had been locked out of Grey Cup play that season with the formation of the Canadian Football League, though the ORFU had pulled out of Grey Cup competition four years earlier.

In 1959, Filchock served as backfield coach for the Calgary Stampeders of the CFL. He was named the first head coach of the Denver Broncos of the new American Football League on January 1, 1960. In December 1961, he was fired after two disappointing seasons. His final record with the Broncos was 7–20–1.

In 1964, Filchock was defensive coach with the Quebec Rifles of the United Football League. That was his final year in football. All told, he had played or coached professional football in twelve cities, six leagues (he just missed the AAFC by playing with Baltimore the year of the merger) and two countries. He had also starred in high school, collegiate and service football, and had played minor league baseball with three teams. His overall major-league record as head coach was 67–65–7.

== Head coaching record ==
=== AFL ===
Team	Year	Regular season					Postseason			
Team	Year	Won	Lost	Ties	Win %	Finish	Won	Lost	Win %	Result
DEN	1960	4	9	1	.321	4th in AFL Western	–	–	–	–
DEN	1961	3	11	0	.214	3rd in AFL Western	–	–	–	–
Total		7	20	1	.268		–	–	–	

== Bibliography ==
- Braunwart, Bob, Bob Carroll and Joe Horrigan, "The Peregrinations of Frankie Filchock", Professional Football Researchers Association Annual 1981. Reprinted in From Scrimmage to SnapBack, the Journal of the Canadian Football Historical Association, v. 2, no. 2, Summer 2004. Includes Filchock's official statistics as player and coach (US and Canada).
- Carroll, Dink, "Dollars and Dropkicks", Saturday Night, October 11, 1949, pp. 10–11, 31–32.
- Claassen, Harold, The History of Professional Football, Englewood Cliffs, N.J.: Prentice-Hall, 1963.
- Coenen, Craig R. (2005). From Sandlots to the Super Bowl: The National Football League, 1920–1967. Knoxville, Tennessee: The University of Tennessee Press. ISBN 1-57233-447-9
- Coleman, Jim, Columns on the Filchock affair, Toronto Globe and Mail, August 18, 1947, p. 16; October 1, 1947, p. 18.
- Davis, Jeff (2005). Papa Bear, The Life and Legacy of George Halas. New York: McGraw-Hill ISBN 0-07-146054-3
- Farrar, Harry, "Pro Football's Mr. Gadabout", Denver Post, February 21, 1964.
- "Frankie Filchock Chosen Most Valuable Player in League", Hamilton Spectator, November 3, 1948.
- Gottehrer, Barry, The Giants of New York, New York: G.P. Putnam's Sons, 1963.
- Lyons, Robert S. (2010). On Any Given Sunday, A Life of Bert Bell. Philadelphia: Temple University Press. ISBN 978-1-59213-731-2
- MacCambridge, Michael (2005). America's Game. New York: Anchor Books ISBN 978-0-307-48143-6
- McIlroy, Kimball, "Fall, Football, and Filchock", Saturday Night, September 13, 1947, pp. 26–27.
- Pervin, Lawrence A. (2009). Football's New York Giants. Jefferson, North Carolina: McFarland and Company, Inc. ISBN 978-0-7864-4268-3
- Peterson, Robert W. (1997). Pigskin: The Early Years of Pro Football. New York: Oxford University Press. ISBN 0-19-507607-9
- Walker, Hal, "Here's Filchock", Toronto Globe and Mail, August 20, 1947, p. 15.
