= Frank Liebel =

American football player (1919–1996)

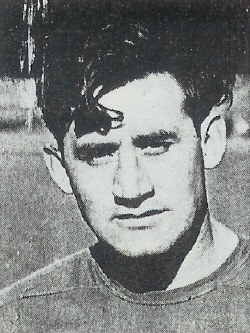

No. 22, 88, 51
- Position: End

Personal information
- Born: November 19, 1919; Erie, Pennsylvania, U.S.
- Died: December 26, 1996 (aged 77); Erie, Pennsylvania, U.S.
- Listed height: 6 ft 1 in (1.85 m)
- Listed weight: 211 lb (96 kg)

Career information
- High school: Erie Academy
- College: Norwich (1939–1941)
- NFL draft: 1942: undrafted

Career history
- New York Giants (1942–1947); Chicago Bears (1948)

Awards and highlights
- NFL receiving touchdowns leader (1945); 2× Second-team All-NFL (1945, 1946); Norwich Cadets Sports Hall of Fame (2008)

Career NFL statistics
- Receptions: 84
- Receiving yards: 1,753
- Receiving touchdowns: 23
- Stats at Pro Football Reference

Frank Edward Liebel (November 19, 1919 – December 26, 1996) was an American professional football end/defensive back who played in the National Football League (NFL). He is also a member of the Pennsylvania Sports Hall of Fame.

== Early life and education ==
Frank was born on November 19, 1919, in Erie, Pennsylvania, to Frank J. Liebel (1896–1957) and Clara Rafferty (1900–1967). His grandfather, Edward Constantine Liebel (1875–1969) was born in Leimersheim, Germany, and was the nephew of Reinhard Liebel (1841–1905), himself the uncle of Michael Liebel, Jr. (1870–1927) (Mayor of Erie, Pennsylvania, from 1906 to 1911, and a Democratic member of the United States House of Representatives from Pennsylvania, from 1915 to 1917), all of Erie, Pennsylvania. Together Frank and Clara had four children:

- William Liebel (1915–1972)
- Frank Edward Liebel (1919–1996)
- Robert Martin Liebel (1922–1999)
- Betty Liebel (1924–2001)

He attended Erie Academy for high school and Norwich University for college, graduating in 1943.

== Career ==
Liebel began his NFL career with the New York Giants, signing with them as a free agent in 1942, a year before he graduated from Norwich.

He played seven seasons for the New York Giants (1942–1947) and the Chicago Bears (1948). He led the league in 1945 in yard per reception (27.0) and receiving touchdowns (10) for his 22 receptions. He also was Named to the All-NFL 2nd Team in both 1945 and 1946.

During the 1944 NFL Championship Game, Liebel was on the Giants’ sideline when they lost to Green Bay, and again in 1948, this time with the Chicago Cardinals, for the 1948 NFL Championship Game with the Cardinals when they fell to Philadelphia in the final.

Liebel also was a reserve for the 1948 Chicago Cardinals, but didn’t record any statistics for them. His final career NFL numbers were 84 receptions for 1,753 yards and 23 TDs on offense, plus seven interceptions and three fumble recoveries on defense.

=== 1946 NFL Championship Game ===
The day before the 1946 NFL Championship Game between the New York Giants and the Chicago Bears, two players for the Giants, Frank Filchock and Merle Hapes, had been accused of taking bribes to fix the game from Alvin Paris. New York City Mayor William O'Dwyer had Jack Mara, Wellington Mara and Bert Bell informed of the police evidence against the two.

Within hours, the four then met at Gracie Mansion and the mayor interviewed the players one at a time. Under questioning, Hapes admitted that he was offered a bribe and Filchock denied being offered it. Several hours later, Paris was arrested and confessed to bribing the players. Hapes was suspended by Bell, but Filchock was allowed to play.

During the game, Liebel caught a 38-yard scoring pass from quarterback Frank Filchock, which New York eventually lost 24–14 to the Chicago Bears. During Paris' trial weeks later, Filchock admitting taking the bribe under oath.

=== Honors ===
Liebel was inducted into the Norwich University Sports Hall of Fame Class of 2008, and the Pennsylvania Sports Hall of Fame.

== Post-football career ==
After retiring from the NFL, he worked for 29 years with Erie County’s probation and parole department.

== Personal life ==
In 1946, Frank married Arline M. Gorenflo (1923–2011), who was born in Cleveland, Ohio, and was the daughter of the Bert and Esther Johnson Gorenflo. Together Frank and Arline had three children:

- Gary Liebel
- Gayle Liebel
- Tina Liebel

They are buried together at Laurel Hill Cemetery in Millcreek Township, Erie County, Pennsylvania.
