= Everett High School (Massachusetts) =

Public high school in Everett, Massachusetts

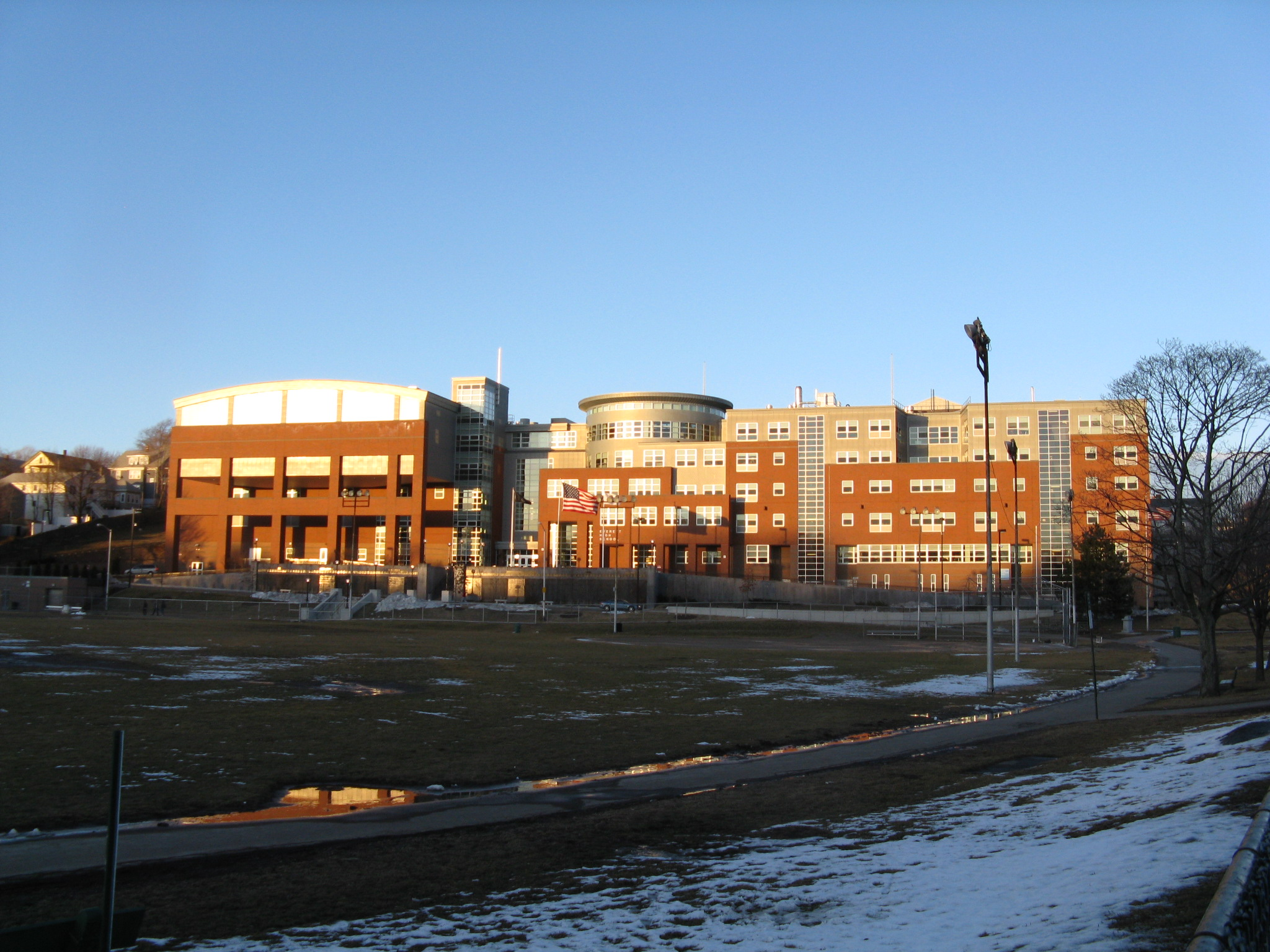

Location
- 100 Elm Street; Everett, Massachusetts 02149; United States; 42°24′51.77″N 71°2′36.89″W

Information
- School type: Public High school
- Motto: The Tide RISES
- School district: Everett Public Schools
- Superintendent: William Hart
- Principal: John Braga
- Teaching staff: 190.6 (FTE)
- Grades: 9–12
- Enrollment: 2307 (2024-2025)
  - Grade 9: 567
  - Grade 10: 598
  - Grade 11: 594
  - Grade 12: 546
  - SP: 2
- Student to teacher ratio: 13.4
- Colors: Crimson, old gold and white
- Fight song: Victory March
- Athletics conference: Greater Boston League
- Team name: Crimson Tide
- Rival: Xaverian Brothers High School
- Accreditation: NEASC
- Newspaper: The Crimson Times
- Yearbook: Crimson Tide
- Website: eh.everettpublicschools.org

Everett High School is a public high school in Everett, Massachusetts, United States operated by Everett Public Schools. The school's previous building was located on Broadway in Everett for almost a century. A new high school was built on Elm Street, which opened in September 2007.

== Athletics ==
=== Honors ===
- 31 x Greater Boston League Titles - 1955, 1961–1965, 1972, 1975, 1995–2013, 2020-2023
- 12 x Division 1 "Super Bowl" Championships - 1997, 1999, 2001–2003, 2006–2007, 2010–2012, 2016–2017.
- 2 x National Championships - 1914 & 1915 (Co-Champs with Central of Detroit).
- 1 x Boys Basketball Class A State Champions - 1959
- 1 x Boys Baseball Division 1 State Champions - 1956

=== Other sports ===
- Baseball
- Basketball
- Boys' soccer
- Boys’ hockey
- Crew/Rowing
- Cross country
- Field hockey
- American football
- Girls’ basketball
- Girls’ hockey
- Girls’ soccer
- Girls’ softball
- Lacrosse
- Golf
- Soccer
- Tennis
- Track
- Volleyball
- Marching band
- Boys Wrestling

== Notable alumni ==
- Baseball
  - Patricia Courtney
  - Maddy English
  - Barney Olsen
- Basketball
  - Pat Bradley
  - Nerlens Noel
- Entertainment
  - Charles Bickford, actor
  - Ellen Pompeo, actor, producer and director.
- Judges
  - A. David Mazzone
- Military
  - Andrew P. Iosue
  - Joseph Frank "Fritz" Wehner
- Politicians
  - Edward G. Connolly
  - George Keverian
  - Stephen Stat Smith
  - Sal DiDomenico
- American football
  - Charles Brickley
  - George Brickley
  - Matthew W. Bullock
  - Jackson Cannell
  - Frank Champi
  - Johnny Dell Isola
  - Omar Easy
  - Diamond Ferri
  - Mario Giannelli
  - Hub Hart
  - Pat Hughes
  - Pike Johnson
  - Bobby Leo
  - Isaiah Likely
  - Andy Oberlander
  - Carlins Platel
  - Lewis Cine
  - Mike Sainristil
  - Josaiah Stewart
  - Ralph Pasquariello
  - Al Pierotti
  - Art Raimo
  - Dan Ross
  - Rick Sapienza
  - Fred Sweetland
  - Ray Trowbridge

== Notable faculty ==
- George Brickley (athletic director and football coach; 1922–1925)
- Harry A. Dame (mathematics teacher and football and baseball coach; 1905–1909)
- Omar Easy (vice principal; 2012–2019)
- Ginger Fraser (science teacher and football and baseball coach; 1916–1917)
- Dennis Gildea (English teacher, athletic director, and football, baseball, and track and field coach; 1926–1963)
- Frank Keaney (football coach; 1917–1919)
- Cleo A. O'Donnell (football coach; 1909–1916)
- Moody Sarno (English teacher and football coach; 1938–1941, 1955–1982)
- John DiBiaso (football coach and basketball; 1992-2017 / 1982-2018)
