= Everett Public Schools =

Everett Public Schools or Everett School District may refer to:

- Everett Public Schools (Massachusetts), in Everett, Massachusetts, U.S.
- Everett Public Schools (Washington), in Everett, Washington, U.S.
