= Ray Trowbridge =

American football player (1896–1962)

Profile
- Position: End

Personal information
- Born: August 27, 1896; Hingham, Massachusetts, U.S.
- Died: October 3, 1962 (aged 66)
- Listed height: 6 ft 0 in (1.83 m)
- Listed weight: 170 lb (77 kg)

Career information
- High school: Everett (Everett, Massachusetts)
- College: Piurdue, Boston College

Career history
- Cleveland Tigers (1920); New York Brickley Giants (1921)
- Stats at Pro Football Reference

Raymond Gerard Trowbridge (August 27, 1896 – October 3, 1962) was an American professional football player. He played in the American Professional Football Association (AFPA)—which became the National Football League (NFL) in 1922—with the Cleveland Tigers and the New York Brickley Giants. Brickley's New York Giants are not related to the modern-day New York Giants.

Trowbridge played football for Everett High School in Everett, Massachusetts. He was a member of the 1914 Everett team that went 13–0 and outscored opponents 600 to 0. Prior to joining the NFL, Trowbridge played college football at Boston College and Purdue University.
