= Dennis Gildea =

American football player and coach (1898–1976)

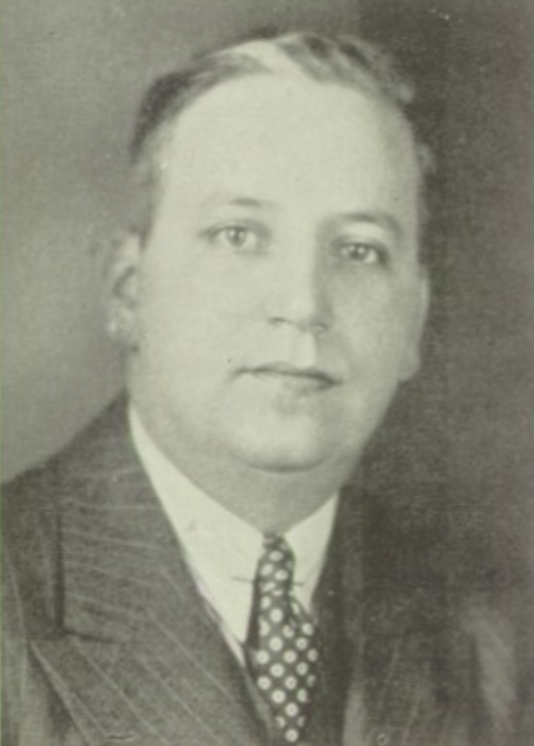
- Gildea in 1942.

Profile
- Position: Center

Personal information
- Born: October 9, 1898; Boston, Massachusetts
- Died: February 22, 1976 (aged 77); Peabody, Massachusetts
- Listed height: 5 ft 9 in (1.75 m)
- Listed weight: 190 lb (86 kg)

Career information
- High school: Boston College High School
- College: Holy Cross

Career history
- Hartford Blues (1926)

Dennis Anthony Gildea (October 9, 1898 – February 22, 1976) was an American football player and coach.

== Early life and military service ==
Gildea was born on October 9, 1898, in the Roxbury neighborhood of Boston, Massachusetts. He was one of ten children born to Thomas and Catherine Gildea. His brother, Thomas, was captain of the Boston College Eagles baseball team in 1918 and 1919. He attended Boston College High School. He enlisted and served in the United States Army during World War I.

== College football ==
Gildea played Center for the Holy Cross Crusaders from 1920 to 1922. The Crusaders went 17–9 during Gildea's three years on the team. He was elected captain during the 1921 season. “The Iron Major” Frank Cavanaugh rated him as one of the best blockers he ever saw.

== Early coaching career ==
In 1922 and 1923, Gildea served as assistant coach at Fitchburg High School. He then served as head coach at Leominster High School in 1924 and 1925.

== NFL ==
In 1926, played seven games for the Hartford Blues of the National Football League.

== Everett High School ==
From 1926 to 1954, Gildea was head football coach at Everett High School. He compiled an overall record of 163–72–29. His teams were champions in 1927, 1936, and 1945. Gildea was known as an innovator in high school football. His 1940s teams used the T formation and he was one of the first coaches to frequently use substitutions and special assignments for certain players.

In addition to serving as EHS's football coach, Gildea was also an English teacher, baseball and track and field coach, and from 1945 to 1963 served as athletic director.

== Personal life and death ==
In 1926 Gildea married Ethel K. Barry, a schoolteacher from Cambridge, Massachusetts. They had two children, Barry and Dennis Jr. Barry played football for Everett High and coached football at Holbrook High School, Lynn English High School, and Northeast Metropolitan Regional Vocational High School. Dennis Jr. worked as a night manager at a Roy Rogers outside of Alexandria, Virginia. He was one of four men killed in a high-profile robbery there on March 6, 1976.

In 1935, Gildea graduated from Boston College Law School.

Gildea died of a stroke on February 22, 1976, in Peabody, Massachusetts.
