= George Brickley =

American baseball and football player (1894–1947)

Profile
- Position: Tailback

Personal information
- Born: July 19, 1894; Everett, Massachusetts, U.S.
- Died: February 23, 1947 (aged 52); Everett, Massachusetts, U.S.
- Listed height: 5 ft 10 in (1.78 m)
- Listed weight: 190 lb (86 kg)

Career information
- College: Trinity (CT)

Career history
- 1920: Cleveland Tigers
- 1921: New York Brickley Giants

George Brickley
- Outfielder
- Batted: Right Threw: Right

MLB debut
- September 26, 1913, for the Philadelphia Athletics

Last MLB appearance
- October 1, 1913, for the Philadelphia Athletics

MLB statistics
- Batting average: .167
- Hits: 2
- Runs batted in: 0
- Stats at Baseball Reference

Teams
- Philadelphia Athletics (1913)

George Vincent Brickley (July 19, 1894 – February 23, 1947) was an American professional athlete that competed in baseball and American football. In baseball, he played as an outfielder in the majors for the Philadelphia Athletics in 1913. He later played football as a tailback for the Cleveland Tigers and the New York Brickley Giants of the American Professional Football Association, which was later renamed the National Football League (NFL).

== Athletic career ==
=== Baseball ===
Brickley made his debut with the Athletics on September 26, 1913 at the age of eighteen, making him one of the ten youngest players in the league that year. He appeared in a total of five games and played four in right field, making no errors in two chances. As a hitter, in thirteen plate appearances, Brickley collected two hits (a single and a triple), struck out four times, and was hit by a pitch once.

=== Football ===
After professional baseball, Brickley went on to Trinity College in Connecticut, where he played football. His status as a former professional athlete did not sit well with opposing schools. Columbia University requested that Trinity keep Brickley out of a game between the two schools, a request that Trinity denied. Columbia cancelled the game as a result.

Brickley later appeared in a total of seven professional football games in 1920 and 1921. Five of those games were for the Cleveland Tigers, and the other two were the only two league games ever played by the New York Brickley Giants (no relation to the current NFL team). His brother, Charles Brickley, was the founder of the New York Brickley Giants.

== Later life ==
After his athletic career ended, Brickley served as athletic director and head football coach at Everett High School from 1922 to 1925. He then served as head football coach at Woburn High School.

== Family ==
Brickley was the brother of Charles Brickley, an American football player and coach, for whom he played on the New York Giants in 1921. His grandson is former National Hockey League player and current Boston Bruins television analyst Andy Brickley.
