= Rick Sapienza =

American football player (1936–2026)

No. 22
- Position: Defensive back

Personal information
- Born: February 8, 1936; Boston, Massachusetts, U.S.
- Died: August 2, 2026 (aged 90)
- Listed height: 5 ft 11 in (1.80 m)
- Listed weight: 185 lb (84 kg)

Career information
- High school: Everett (Everett, Massachusetts)
- College: Villanova

Career history
- New York Titans (1960)
- Stats at Pro Football Reference

Americo J. Sapienza (February 8, 1936 – August 2, 2026) was an American professional football player who was a defensive back and halfback with the New York Titans of the American Football League (AFL), starting one game and recording a 4-yard reception, in addition to being responsible for punting duties. He played college football for the Villanova Wildcats. Sapienza died on August 2, 2026, at the age of 90.
