= Omar Easy =

Jamaican-born American football player

No. 43, 33
- Position: Fullback

Personal information
- Born: October 29, 1977 (age 49); Spanish Town, Jamaica
- Listed height: 6 ft 2 in (1.88 m)
- Listed weight: 245 lb (111 kg)

Career information
- High school: Everett (Everett, Massachusetts, U.S.)
- College: Penn State
- NFL draft: 2002: 4th round, 107th overall pick

Career history
- Kansas City Chiefs (2002–2004); Oakland Raiders (2005)

Career NFL statistics
- Receptions: 6
- Receiving yards: 42
- Receiving touchdowns: 1
- Stats at Pro Football Reference

Omar Xavier Easy (born October 29, 1977) is a Jamaican-born American former professional football fullback in the National Football League (NFL). He played collegiate football at Penn State before being selected by the Kansas City Chiefs in the fourth round of the 2002 NFL draft. He played one season for the Oakland Raiders before retiring due to knee problems.

== Early life and college ==
Easy was named Gatorade and USA Today Massachusetts Player of the Year in 1996 while at Everett High School in Everett, Massachusetts. As a college senior, he was the Most Valuable Player of the 2001 Blue–Gray Football Classic.

== Professional career ==
=== Kansas City Chiefs ===
Easy was selected by the Kansas City Chiefs in the fourth round, with the 107th overall pick, of the 2002 NFL draft. He officially signed with the team on June 11, 2002. He played in seven games in 2002, catching three passes for 23 yards and a touchdown while also recording six solo tackles. Easy appeared in 15 games during the 2003 season, totaling three receptions for 19 yards and three solo tackles. He played in 15 games again in 2004 and made two solo tackles.

=== Oakland Raiders ===
Easy signed with the Oakland Raiders on June 21, 2005. He appeared in a career-high 16 games in 2005, recording 13 solo tackles and one assisted tackle.

== Post-playing career ==
From 2007 to 2009, Easy served as assistant offensive football coach and boys’ head track and field coach for his high school alma mater, Everett High School.

In 2011, Easy was appointed director of player personnel and development in football for his college alma mater, Penn State. In January 2012, he left that position to become vice principal of his high school alma mater Everett High School.

In January 2021, Easy entered into negotiations to become the next Superintendent of Schools for Wayland, Massachusetts Public Schools. He began his term on July 1, 2021. In February 2023, he was placed on leave from the position under allegations of misconduct.

In 2024, Easy was named assistant athletics director for the Brand Academy at Penn State.

== Personal life ==
Easy suffers from exercise-induced asthma. He established the EasyWay Foundation in 2003 to benefit children with asthma.

He is married to volleyball player Megan Hodge.

He received his B.A. degree in broadcast journalism in 2001 from Pennsylvania State University, which included a minor in business management. He also received both his Master of Education (M.Ed.) in the field of education administration and his Ph.D. in educational leadership from Pennsylvania State University. Additionally, he earned a master's degree in business administration from the University of Phoenix in 2010.
