= Commercial Field =

Athletic field in Brooklyn, New York

- Location within New York City Location within New York
- Location: Albany Avenue; Brooklyn, New York 11225
- Coordinates: 40°39′45″N 73°56′27″W
- Surface: Natural grass (1906–2006); Artificial turf (2006–present)

Construction
- Opened: 1906

Tenants
- Commercial High School (1906–1940); New York Brickley Giants (APFA) (1921); Brooklyn Lions (AFL I) (1926)

Commercial Field is an athletic field located in the Wingate neighborhood of Brooklyn. It was home to the Commercial High School soccer, football, and baseball teams from around 1906. Other schools, such as Boys High, also called Commercial Field their home from time to time, as did local teams in the American Soccer League in the 1930s. The field was also the home field of the short-lived New York Brickley Giants, of the early National Football League, who played two games there during their 1921 season. In 1926, the Brooklyn Horsemen of the first American Football League used the stadium as their home field.

== History ==
The lot was acquired by the New York Parks Department in 1940, and the field survives today as a multi-sport facility called Hamilton-Metz Field named after US Representative and New York City Comptroller Herman A. Metz and US Founding Father Alexander Hamilton.

In 1929, a visiting Bermudan cricket team played several matches at Commercial Field, defeating the All-New York and All-Brooklyn teams. The Bermudans returned for more tours during the 1930s. In 2006, a $1.57 million restoration was completed, with the field relaid in artificial turf. Neighborhood residents often refer to the field by yet another name, Lefferts Park.
