= Harry A. Dame =

American football player and coach (1878–1933)

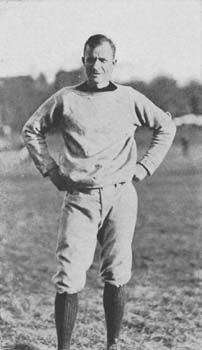

Biographical details
- Born: October 27, 1878; Lynn, Massachusetts, U.S.
- Died: September 7, 1933 (aged 54); Cleveland, Ohio, U.S.

Playing career
- 1898–1899: Springfield

Coaching career (HC unless noted)
- 1901–1905: Waltham HS (MA)
- 1905: Milton Academy (MA)
- 1905–1909: Everett HS (MA)
- 1909–1915: Waltham HS (MA)
- 1915–1917: Lynn English HS (MA)
- 1919–1921: Western Reserve

Head coaching record
- Overall: 9–18 (college football); 4–6 (college baseball); 1–6 (college track)

Harry Austin Dame (October 27, 1878 – September 7, 1933) was an American football coach.

== Early life ==
Dame was born in Lynn, Massachusetts. He graduated from Lynn Classical High School in 1898. He then attended Springfield Training School, where played quarterback for the school's football team. He graduated from Springfield Training School in 1900 and later took courses at Tufts College and Boston University.

== Coaching career ==
=== High school ===
After college, Dame began a career in physical instruction. He served as athletic director of Waltham High School until his resignation in June 1905. He then worked as an instructor at the Milton Academy until September 1905, when he was hired to coach football and baseball and teach mathematics at Everett High School. He left Everett in 1909 to return Waltham High School. In addition to serving as athletic director, Dame coached football and basketball and served as Waltham's supervisor of parks. In 1915, Waltham's football team finished the season undefeated and played Everett High School at Fenway Park for the right to play Detroit's Central High School for the National scholastic football championship. Everett defeated Waltham 6–0 in front of 12,000 spectators, an attendance record for a Massachusetts high school football game. Later that year, Dame accepted a position as physical instructor at Lynn English High School. Prior to his departure, his football team played a testimonial game against an all-star team consisting of college and former high school players. Waltham won 24–6. In the summer of 1917, Dame took a group of Lynn English students to work on Sorosis Military Farm in Marblehead as part of an experiment by conceived by an executive from the A. E. Little Co., which owned the farm. The experiment combined farm work with military conditions in an effort to increase the boys' interest in farm work, provide them with military instruction, and assist in war production. He resigned from Lynn English on September 25, 1917.

=== College ===
From 1919 to 1922, Dame was the athletic director and a coach at Western Reserve University. He coached baseball from 1919 to 1920, basketball from 1919 to 1922, football from 1919 to 1921, and track from 1919 to 1920. He compiled a 4–6 coaching record in baseball, 9–18 in football, and 1–6 in track.

In 1921, the R Club, a Western Reserve alumni group, demanded that Dame be replaced as head football coach by his assistant and predecessor Frank A. Yocum. Dame was supported by the school's faculty and his players. The negativity towards Dame was so strong that police officers were stationed at the entrance of fields to turn away alumni. The University Athletic Committee, which included Dame, chose not to take any action.

== Late life and death ==
Dame later worked at Walnut Hills High School in Cincinnati, Ohio, until his resignation in 1928. He died on September 7, 1933, in Cleveland, Ohio.
