= Timothy J. Mara =

American businessman (1939–1995)

Tim Mara, Jr.
- Tim Mara, Jr.

Profile
- Positions: Owner/Secretary, Treasurer

Personal information
- Born: August 6, 1935; New York, New York, U.S.
- Died: June 1, 1995 (aged 59); Jupiter, Florida, U.S.

Career information
- High school: Loyola (New York City)
- College: Fordham

Career history
- New York Giants (1965–1991) Owner/President

Awards and highlights
- 2× Super Bowl champion (XXI, XXV)

Timothy J. Mara (August 6, 1935 – June 1, 1995) was an American businessman and part owner of the New York Giants football team. He, along with his mother Helen and sister Maura Concannon, owned a 50% stake in the team from 1965 until 1991. However, Tim Mara was much more involved with the team than his mother or his sister were.

== Early life and career ==
Tim Mara was the son of Jack Mara, one of the two owners of the Giants with his brother Wellington. His grandfather, also named Tim, was the founder of the franchise having started it in 1925. Tim's father was named co-owner with brother Wellington beginning in 1930, but once Jack died in 1965 Tim, along with mother Helen and sister Maura, took over his father's stake in the team. However, Helen and Maura had little interest in the Giants and allowed Tim to vote their shares as well as his own. This effectively made Tim a full partner with Wellington, and he took the active role in day-to-day operations that his father had. At the time the younger Tim Mara took over, the Giants were in a state of decline, having just come off a two-win season that followed a trip to the NFL Championship game; after the season, two of the Giants' biggest stars, quarterback Y. A. Tittle and flanker Frank Gifford, retired.

=== Feud with Wellington ===
Tim and his uncle Wellington had a somewhat frosty relationship, mainly due to a clash in styles. Whereas Wellington Mara was more of a laid-back owner, his nephew was very outspoken and would not hold back from criticizing the team. Tim was also notorious for running the Giants in odd ways, such as changing parking arrangements one hour before a game. The personality conflict took an ugly turn by 1968. Things had come to such a head by 1979, Wellington and Tim were not speaking to each other at all. In that year, Mara upset his uncle by pushing to have former Washington Redskins coach George Allen, who Wellington Mara was not fond of, hired to replace John McVay as the Giants' coach. (Ray Perkins was eventually hired). To make matters worse, Mara and his uncle were dealing with a revolting fanbase who was tired of seeing year after year of losing teams. The Giants had tallied only two winning seasons since their last title game appearance in 1963. Both men endured criticism for what was perceived as a lack of ability to see that or more of a concern over their personal squabbles than over the football teams. The Giants had actually bottomed out a year earlier, when a sure win over the Philadelphia Eagles turned into a shocking loss when Herman Edwards recovered a fumbled handoff and took it all the way back for a touchdown that turned a Giant victory into a defeat.

Eventually, NFL commissioner Pete Rozelle stepped in to mediate the feud and convince the Maras to do something to improve the team. This was accomplished by hiring George Young, the director of personnel for the Miami Dolphins, to be the team's general manager, with full authority over football matters. Although Mara's job was made easier by this move, the feud between uncle and nephew continued to fester. However, things slowly began to improve for the Giants and by 1981, the team returned to the playoffs. In 1984, the Giants hit their stride and made the playoffs three consecutive years which culminated in a Super Bowl victory at the end of the 1986 season. Although Tim and Wellington Mara would still be at odds, the use of Young as a go-between enabled the Giants to run more effectively and for better hires to be made than had been made over the previous two decades of co-ownership. This was mentioned during the Super Bowl XXI postgame show, where CBS' Brent Musburger brought up the schism between the Maras but how things were now better in spite of it. (This did not stop the owners from appearing separately during the program — the initial trophy presentation was made by Commissioner Rozelle to Wellington Mara while Tim was interviewed later and was not standing on the podium until after the trophy presentation; later, when the trophy from Super Bowl XXV was presented, Tim stood on the opposite side of Wellington with Commissioner Paul Tagliabue, Musburger (who was now working for ABC), and Young in between them and was not interviewed until his uncle left the stage.)

=== Leaving the Giants ===
Shortly after the Giants' victory in Super Bowl XXV, in February 1991, Mara announced he was selling the 50% stake his family controlled to Bob Tisch, president of Loews Corporation and former Postmaster General of the United States, saying "the time was right" and revealing he had tried to sell his stake twice before but decided not to. He spent the next three years still continuing the feud with his uncle until former Giant and broadcaster Frank Gifford stepped in and brought the two together, where they seemed to come to more common ground.

== Personal life and death ==
On June 1, 1995, Tim Mara died of Hodgkin's disease in Jupiter, Florida at the age of 59. He was survived by an ex-wife and his mother and sister.
