= Alvin J. Paris =

Alvin Jay Paris (October 17, 1918 – September 11, 2006), later known as Alvin Jay Paley, was an American bookmaker and gambler in New York. As a "front man" for a gambling syndicate based in Elizabeth, New Jersey, he fixed college sporting events through bribing star athletes, including Rocky Graziano.

Paris was born on October 17, 1918, in The Bronx, New York. During World War II, he served in the armed forces from 1940.

After being recorded on federal wiretaps on December 15, 1946, in an investigation by Manhattan District Attorney Frank S. Hogan, a former assistant to crusading New York District Attorney Thomas Dewey, he was convicted of attempting to bribe professional football players Merle Hapes and Frank Filchock of the New York Giants with $2,500 each to throw that year's NFL championship game against the Chicago Bears. Paris was eventually convicted of bribery on January 8, 1947, and, although Hapes and Filchock were cleared of bribery charges, both men were initially suspended by then league commissioner Bert Bell (with Filchock being allowed to play the final game against the Chicago Bears).

During his trial, Paris chose not to take the stand in his own defense and later testified against his partners David Krakauer, Jerome Zarowitz and Harvey Stemmer (the last of whom would also take part in what's considered the first ever gambling scandal in college basketball history with a 1945 match between Brooklyn College and the University of Akron), for which he would later receive death threats. Paris's sentencing had been deferred until after the second trial and he received a one-year sentence on April 7. He served less than a year before his release.

Paris married Norah Mae Gagnon King in Orange, California, in 1950. By 1977, Paris had changed his name to Alvin J. Paley. Norah died in San Joaquin, California, on January 8, 1994, at the age of 75. Alvin Paley died on September 11, 2006, at the age of 87.
