= Billy Gibson (boxing) =

American boxing promoter (1876–1947)

- Born: 1876
- Died: July 21, 1947 (aged 70–71); New York City, New York
- Occupations: Boxing promoter, manager, matchmaker

William J. Gibson (1876–1947) was a boxing promoter and manager for Benny Leonard (a former Lightweight champion), Gene Tunney (a former Heavyweight champion), Paulino Uzcudun, and featherweight Louis Kaplan. He was also the owner of the short-lived New York Brickley Giants of the National Football League. Gibson began his career in boxing as a promoter in Bronx. He teamed up with Leonard in 1914 and was his manager up until the 1917 lightweight championship. In 1923, Gibson became the manager of Tunney, who would go on to win the heavyweight title. Gibson retired in 1928.

Gibson also served as matchmaker and manager at Madison Square Garden for two years. In 1921, Gibson put his financial backing behind Charles Brickley, who formed the NFL's New York Brickley Giants for one season in 1921. In 1925, the NFL was in need of a franchise in large city market, that could be used to showcase the league. NFL President, Joseph Carr traveled to New York to offer Gibson another franchise. Gibson who lost money heavily on the New York Brickley Giants, refused the offer. However, he referred Carr to his friend, Tim Mara, who established the modern day New York Giants that year.

Gibson died of natural causes on July 21, 1947. He was inducted into the International Boxing Hall of Fame in 2009.
