= Everett Public Schools (Massachusetts) =

School district in Everett, Massachusetts, United States

Address
- 121 Vine Street Everett, Massachusetts, 02149; United States

District information
- Superintendent: William D. Hart

Other information
- Website: www.everettpublicschools.org

Everett Public Schools is a school district in Everett, Massachusetts, United States.

== Schools ==
- Everett High School
- Albert N. Parlin School
- George Keverian School
- Lafayette School
- Sumner G. Whittier School
- Webster School
- Madeline English School
- Deven's School
