= Charles Brickley =

American football player and coach (1891–1949)

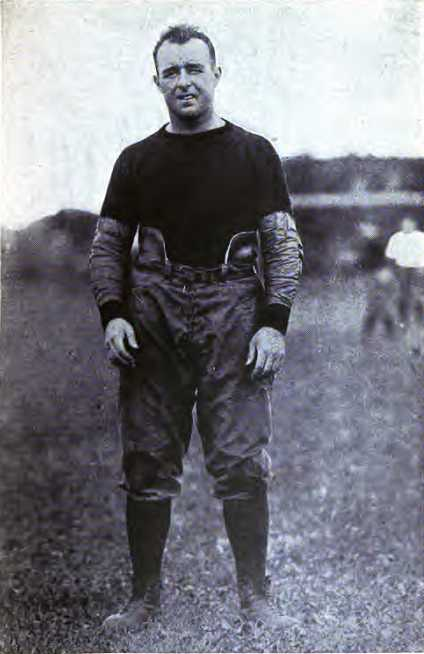

Profile
- Position: Fullback

Personal information
- Born: November 24, 1891; Boston, Massachusetts, U.S.
- Died: December 28, 1949 (aged 58); New York, New York, U.S.

Career information
- College: Harvard

Career history

Playing
- 1917: Massillon Tigers
- 1921: New York Brickley Giants

Coaching
- 1915: Johns Hopkins
- 1916–1917: Boston College
- 1917: Massillon Tigers
- 1918: Naval Transport Service
- 1921: New York Brickley Giants

Awards and highlights
- 2× National Champion (1912, 1913); 2× Consensus All-American (1912, 1913); College coaching record: 18–6; NFL coaching record: 5-3; "Ohio League" coaching record: 0-1
- Coaching profile at Pro Football Reference

Charles Edward Brickley (November 24, 1891 – December 28, 1949) was an American football player and coach. He was a two-time All-American at Harvard and set college football records for career and single-season field goals. He then served as the head football coach at the Johns Hopkins University in 1915 and Boston College from 1916 to 1917 and coached the New York Brickley Giants of the American Professional Football Association—now the National Football League—in 1921. He also competed the triple jump at the 1912 Summer Olympics.

== Early life and family ==
Brickley was born in Boston, Massachusetts and raised in Everett, Massachusetts. He stood 5'10" and weighed 181 pounds during his athletic career.

== Athletic career ==
Brickley attended Harvard College, where he played football from 1911 to 1914 for the Crimson as a fullback and placekicker under head coach Percy Haughton. He was named an All-American in 1913 and 1914. During the 1913 Harvard–Yale game, Brickley kicked all five of Harvard's field goals in the Crimson's 15–5 win over Yale. He set college football records for most field goals made by one player in a single season (13) and most career field goals (34). Brickley was often compared to Otis Guernsey, whom was seen as one of his rivals.

Brickley also competed in the triple jump at 1912 Summer Olympics, finishing 9th. At the same Olympics he competed in the baseball event which was held as demonstration sport.

In 1917, Brickley became a player-coach for the Massillon Tigers, of the Ohio League.

== Coaching career ==
Brickley's first coaching job was during his senior year at Harvard, where he served as an assistant to the University of Virginia football team during the team's August practices.

After graduating, Brickley was sought by many schools looking for head coaches, including New York University and Penn State. After initially refusing to coach, Brickley eventually accepted the head coaching job at Johns Hopkins University.

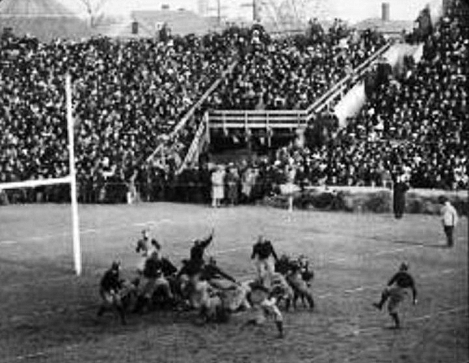
Brickley's drop kick to defeat Dartmouth in 1912.

In 1916, he led Boston College to its first victory over rival Holy Cross since 1889. He left Boston College in 1918 to join the United States Navy Reserve.

He was quartermaster for the Naval Transport Service at the Hoboken Port of Embarkation and both played and coached for the Naval Transport Service's football team. In January 1919, Brickley was named as the 1918 Collier's All-Service Team first squad fullback by Walter Camp.

Brickley was named head coach at Fordham University in 1919, however the school later decided to cancel the season. He was an advisory coach for Fordham during the 1921 season when his younger brother, Arthur, was a member of the team. In 1922, Brickley was offered the position of head coach at Northwestern, but the two sides could not agree on terms and the school hired Glenn Thistlethwaite instead.

== Owner ==
In 1921, Brickley and Billy Gibson formed a professional football team known as the New York Brickley Giants (also known as Brickley's Giants or Brickley's Brooklyn Giants) that played in the National Football League in 1921. The Giants lost both of their league games by a combined score of 72 to 0.

That same year, Brickley purchased the Harrisburg franchise in the Eastern Basketball League, which he quickly sold to New York Celtics owner James Furey.

== Later life ==
After leaving the Navy, Brickley began working for a New York stock brokerage firm. He later headed his own firm, Charley E. Brickley & Co, and by 1921, was reported to have a fortune in the six figures. In 1923, Brickley was indicted on charges of illegal stock negotiations. He was found not guilty of forgery and larceny by a jury on May 28, 1925. On March 1, 1928, Brickley was found guilty of four counts of larceny and bucketing orders from customers of Charles E. Brickley, Inc., from 1925 to 1927. He was released on parole in December.

During World War II, Brickley was a pipe-fitter at a Wilmington, Delaware shipyard. After the war, he worked as an advertising salesman in New York City.

In 1949, Brickley and his son, Charles Jr., were arrested after starting a fight in a Manhattan restaurant. According to testimony, the fight began when Brickley overheard somebody say, "Is that old bald-headed so-and-so Charlie Brickley, the football player?" or "You mean that old bald-headed man is the great Charlie Brickley?" Brickley died the day the charges against him were to be dismissed. He was buried at Holy Cross Cemetery in Malden, Massachusetts.

== Family ==
Brickley's brother George Brickley played five games for the Philadelphia Athletics in 1913. His youngest brother Arthur Brickley played football and baseball for Columbia (1920), Fordham (1921), and Providence (1923). Brickley's oldest son, Charles "Chick" Brickley, Jr. played football at Yale and was a minor league baseball player for the Boston Red Sox. His youngest son, John "Bud" Brickley, signed with the New York Giants in 1946 following his discharge from the United States Marine Corps. His grandson, John Brickley, was a kicker for the University of Rhode Island. His grandnephew is former National Hockey League player Andy Brickley.

== Head coaching record ==
=== College ===
Year	Team	Overall	Conference	Standing	Bowl/playoffs
Johns Hopkins Blue Jays (Independent) (1915)
1915	Johns Hopkins	6–2			
Johns Hopkins:		6–2			
Boston College (Independent) (1916–1917)
1916	Boston College	6–2			
1917	Boston College	6–2			
Boston College:		12–4			
Total:		18–6			
