= Tim Mara =

American football executive (1887–1959)

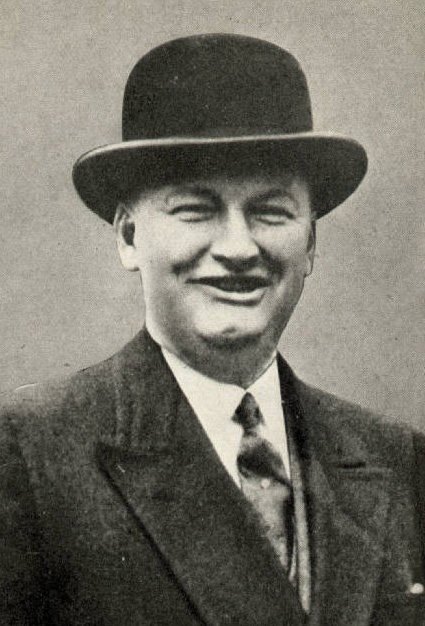
- Mara c. 1930

Personal information
- Born: July 29, 1887; New York, New York, U.S.
- Died: February 16, 1959 (aged 71); New York, New York, U.S.

Career history
- New York Giants (1925–1959) Owner

Awards and highlights
- 4× NFL champion (1927, 1934, 1938, 1956); 8× NFL Eastern Division champion (1933–1935, 1938, 1939, 1941, 1944, 1946); New York Giants Ring of Honor
- Pro Football Hall of Fame

Timothy James Mara (July 29, 1887 – February 16, 1959) was an American professional football executive. He was the founding owner of the New York Giants of the National Football League (NFL). The Giants, under Mara, won NFL championships in 1927, 1934, 1938, and 1956 and divisional titles in 1933, 1935, 1939, 1941, 1944, 1946, and 1958.

== Early life ==
Mara, the son of Elizabeth (née Harris) and John Mara, a policeman, of Irish descent, was born into poverty on New York City's Lower East Side. At the age of 13, he quit school in order to find work to support his mother. His first job was as an usher in a theater. He then worked as a newsboy selling newspapers on the streets. This job brought him into contact with many of New York's bookmakers (or bookies). He soon became a runner for the bookies, earning five percent of the bets he collected and receiving tips from winners when he delivered their cash. By age 18, he was an established bookmaker himself.

== New York Giants ==
=== Formation of the Giants ===
In 1925, the NFL was in need of a franchise in a large city that could be used to showcase the league. NFL President Joseph Carr traveled to New York to offer boxing promoter Billy Gibson a franchise. Gibson had owned the New York Brickley Giants, the NFL's last attempt to put a team in New York. While Gibson turned the offer down, he referred Carr to his friend Tim Mara. While Mara did not know much about football, Mara's friend, Dr. Harry March, did. March, a former physician for the Canton Bulldogs of the pre-NFL "Ohio League" and the future author of the first professional football history book Pro Football: Its Ups and Downs, soon became the club's first secretary.

This backing led Mara to purchase the NFL franchise for New York at a cost of $500–about $7,426.99 in 2020. Mara and March even signed Jim Thorpe to play several half games in order to boost attendance. However many of the New York sports fans still took to college football and stayed away from the pro sport. During the Giants' first season, attendance was so poor that Mara lost over $40,000. To tap into New York's college football fans, Mara tried to sign ex-college football superstar Red Grange only to find that he already was a member of the Chicago Bears. However, still looking for a way to cash in on Grange's popularity, Mara scheduled a game against the Bears to be played at the Polo Grounds. The gate receipts totaled $143,000 for that one game against Grange and the Bears, and Mara recovered all of his losses for the 1925 season.

=== Battle with the AFL and first NFL Championship ===
In 1926, Grange and his manager, C. C. Pyle, formed the first American Football League with a franchise in New York, the Yankees, to compete with the Giants. At the same time, Giants coach Bob Folwell and star tackle Century Milstead, left to join the AFL's Philadelphia Quakers. This led Mara to increase the salaries of all his players by $50 a game to prevent them from leaving the Giants, too. He also signed many players to full-season contracts. Mara suffered $60,000 in financial losses that season. However all but four of the AFL franchises finished the 1926 season. Mara then challenged the AFL champion Philadelphia Quakers to a game and they accepted. In the first inter-league post-season confrontation, the seventh-place Giants defeated the AFL's champion, 31–0. The AFL folded soon thereafter.

By now, Mara was now willing to admit the Yankees into the NFL, as the only survivor of the defunct AFL. He even allowed the team to play its home games at Yankee Stadium. However, Mara was able to dictate the Yankees' schedule. When the Giants were in the Polo Grounds, the Yankees were to be on the road.

The next year, the Giants went 11-1-1 and won their first NFL championship. At the end of the 1928 season, Pyle turned his Yankees' franchise over to Mara. In 1929, Dan Blaine, the owner of the Staten Island Stapletons, applied for an NFL franchise. However, he first needed permission from Mara to set up his franchise, because Staten Island was within Mara's exclusive territory. But Mara actually had an extra franchise since the Yankees folded after the 1928 season, so the franchise again went back to Mara and he passed those franchise's rights on to Staten Island.

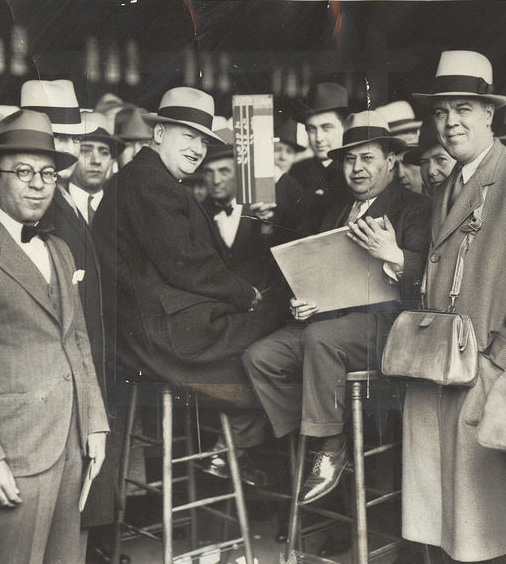
Among his many business interests, Tim Mara was a bookmaker. Here he is pictured at the Jamaica Race Track in 1934

=== Takeover of the Wolverines ===
In 1929, Mara was looking for a player who might approach Grange in fan appeal. He saw Benny Friedman of the Detroit Wolverines as the best option available. When he couldn't make a deal for Friedman, Mara simply bought the entire Detroit franchise for $10,000. For the next few years Mara had ultimate ownership of three NFL franchises; however, he never interfered with the management of any of the teams that operated under his leases.

=== Great Depression era ===
During the Great Depression in 1930, New York Mayor Jimmy Walker approached Mara about playing a charity exhibition game, which he quickly agreed to do. The Giants defeated the Notre Dame All-Stars, which included the legendary Four Horsemen. The Giants easily outscored Notre Dame, 21–0. As a result of the game, Mara and the Giants raised $115,153 for the New York City Unemployment Fund.

=== Battles with other rival leagues ===
In 1936 and 1937, Mara successfully battled for New York's pro football market against the Brooklyn Tigers and the New York Yankees of the second American Football League. He also successfully outlasted the New York Yankees of the third American Football League.

However, from 1946 to 1949, Mara engaged in an all-out war with the All-America Football Conference. Mara and the Giants were faced with two AAFC opponents in the New York City area, the New York Yankees and the Brooklyn Dodgers. Again Mara fought hard for New York's pro football fanbase and eventually won. When the two leagues partially merged after the 1949 season, Mara demanded and got the best players from the combined New York-Brooklyn franchise that had operated in 1949.

== Legacy ==
Mara died in 1959 at the age of 71. His vast contributions to the NFL were recognized with his 1963 election to the charter class of 17 members in the Pro Football Hall of Fame.

== Family ==
Mara left the Giants to his sons, Jack and Wellington Mara, and each inherited a 50% stake. Wellington is in the Pro Football Hall of Fame alongside his father. His grandson through Jack, Timothy J. Mara was later part-owner of the Giants, and his other grandson John Mara, a son of Wellington, is currently the Giants' president and part owner. Only the Chicago Bears (owned by the Halas-McCaskey family since 1921) have been in the hands of one family longer than the Giants. In 1991, Timothy J. Mara, representing his mother and his sister, sold their half-interest in the team.

Tim's great-granddaughters Rooney and Kate Mara are actresses.

== Sources ==
- Gottehrer, Barry. The Giants of New York, the history of professional football's most fabulous dynasty. New York, G. P. Putnam's Sons, 1963 OCLC 1356301
