= New York Brickley Giants =

Defunct American football team

General information
- Founded: 1919 (original); 1921
- Folded: 1922
- Stadium: Commercial Field (2 games); Ebbets Field (1 game); Polo Grounds (1 game)
- Headquartered: New York City, New York
- Colors: Black, orange, gold, cream

Personnel
- Owners: New York Giants (1919); Billy Gibson (1921)
- Head coach: Charles Brickley

Nickname
- Brickley's Giants

Team history
- New York Giants (1921)

League / conference affiliations
- APFA (National Football League)

The New York Giants (informally known as Brickley's Giants and Brickley's New York Giants) were a professional American football team with the American Professional Football Association (now the National Football League) whose only season played was in 1921. The team has also been referred to as the Brooklyn Giants and Brickley's Brooklyn Giants. The Brickley's Giants were the first of 17 professional football teams to represent New York City at one time or another. The team was founded in 1919 by Charles Brickley, who received All-American honors while at Harvard. Brickley's Giants played two games in their only season, losing to the Buffalo All-Americans, 55–0, and the Cleveland Tigers, 17–0. It was the second-shortest-lived franchise in APFA/NFL history, behind only another former New York APFA team, the Tonawanda Kardex, who played only one game in the same 1921 season.

== History ==
=== 1919 team ===
The team was sponsored by the New York Giants professional baseball team, and coached by Brickley, a halfback who was generally considered the finest kicker of his day. Home games were to be played at the baseball Giants' home field, the Polo Grounds.

The team was formed with the intent of competing in 1919. However, after the team's first practice, the 1919 schedule, that began with an opening day game against the Massillon Tigers, was scratched because of conflict with New York's blue laws. In 1919 the city allowed professional baseball on Sunday and the Giants thought the law would also apply to football. However, it was ruled that professional football was still outlawed on Sundays, so the team disbanded.

1921: Brickley's Brooklyn Giants vs. Harway Athletic Association

=== 1921 team ===
The APFA had played a showcase game between the Canton Bulldogs and the Buffalo All-Americans at the Polo Grounds in December 1920; 20,000 spectators witnessed the contest, a strong crowd for the nascent league.

The success of that game prompted the league to seek a New York City-based team for the 1921 season. The Giants thus reformed with the financial backing from boxing promoter, Billy Gibson. Aside from Brickley, the team had no college stars. Joining Charles with the Giants was his brother George Brickley, who played baseball as an outfielder with the Philadelphia Athletics. The 1921 version of the team played several exhibition games, but only two league games, losing to the Buffalo All-Americans in October, and again to the Cleveland Tigers that December. The New York Times reported that the game against Jim Thorpe and his Cleveland Tigers, "was lopsided and had little to excite even the most rabid of rooters." In between games between APFA clubs, the Giants played a number of non-league games against lesser teams. The franchise played two seasons as an independent and folded after the 1923 season. During their 1921 season, the Giants played their home games at Commercial Field and Ebbets Field, both located in Brooklyn, and the Polo Grounds, located in Manhattan.

== Legacy ==
In 1925, with the NFL in need of a franchise in a large-city market that could be used to showcase the league, NFL President Joseph Carr traveled to New York City to offer Billy Gibson, the owner of the Brickley Giants, a new franchise.

Gibson declined Carr's offer for a new franchise, but instead referred Carr to a long-time friend of his, Tim Mara: Mara accepted the offer, and established the modern-day New York Giants franchise.

Other than the name, there is no relation between the Brickley Giants and the modern New York Giants franchise.

== Season-by-season ==
Year	W	L	T	Finish	Coach
1921	6	2	7	18th	Charles Brickley

== See also ==
- List of New York Brickley Giants players
