= Jack Mara =

American football executive (1908–1965)

Profile
- Position: Co-owner

Personal information
- Born: March 21, 1908; New York City, U.S.
- Died: June 29, 1965 (aged 57); New York City, U.S.

Career information
- College: Fordham

Career history
- New York Giants (1959–1965) Owner/President

Awards and highlights
- NFL champion (1956); New York Giants Ring of Honor (2010)

John V. Mara (March 21, 1908 – June 29, 1965) was an American co-owner of the New York Giants, an American football team that plays in the National Football League (NFL). Mara was the son of Elizabeth "Lizette" (née Barclay) and Tim Mara and brother of Wellington, and served as the team's president for 24 years. He and Wellington inherited the team upon their father's death in 1959.

He graduated from Fordham University in 1933 with a law degree. However, he never became a practicing lawyer, instead joining the Giants as team president. In 1934 he married Helen Phelan, daughter of New York State Athletic Commission chairman John J. Phelan. They had two children - Maura and Timothy J. Mara.

Mara died at the age of 57 on June 29, 1965, of cancer at Memorial Hospital. He is buried at the Gate of Heaven Cemetery, Valhalla, New York. He was inducted into the New York Giants Ring of Honor in 2010.
