= 1978 Philadelphia Eagles season =

NFL team season

- Owner: Leonard Tose
- General manager: Jim Murray
- Head coach: Dick Vermeil
- Home stadium: Veterans Stadium

Results
- Record: 9–7
- Division place: 2nd NFC East
- Playoffs: Lost Wild Card Playoffs (at Falcons) 13–14
- Pro Bowlers: T Stan Walters; TE Harold Carmichael; RB Wilbert Montgomery; LB Bill Bergey

The 1978 Philadelphia Eagles season was the franchise's 46th season in the National Football League (NFL). The Eagles reached the postseason for the first time since their championship-winning season in 1960, which ended the longest postseason drought in the franchise's history and one of the longest in the history of the NFL. The Eagles ended their playoff drought by winning their final game in the regular season and needing either the Minnesota Vikings or Green Bay Packers to lose - both teams ended up losing and thus earned a wild card entry. This was also the first season since 1966 in which the franchise finished the season with a winning record. They were knocked out in the Wild Card by the Atlanta Falcons 14–13.

== The Miracle at the Meadowlands ==
The Miracle at the Meadowlands is the term used by sportscasters and Philadelphia Eagles fans for a fumble recovery by cornerback Herman Edwards that he returned for a touchdown at the end of a November 19, 1978 NFL game against the New York Giants in Giants Stadium.

It was seen as miraculous because it occurred at a point in the game when the Giants were easily capable of running out the game's final seconds. The Giants had the ball, and the Eagles had no timeouts left. Everyone watching expected quarterback Joe Pisarcik to take one more snap and kneel with the ball, thus running out the clock and preserving a 17–12 Giant upset. Instead, he attempted to hand it off to fullback Larry Csonka and botched it, allowing Edwards to pick up the ball and run 26 yards for the winning score.

The Eagles were 6–5 going into this game, and the win was crucial in that it ultimately allowed the Eagles to get the fifth-and-final playoff spot in the 1978 NFC playoffs.

== Off season ==
The Eagles held their last training camp at Widener University in the city of Chester, in Delaware County, Pennsylvania)

=== NFL draft ===
The 1978 NFL draft The draft was held May 3-4, 1978. The league also held a supplemental draft after the regular draft and before the regular season. The draft was 12 rounds long with a total of 334 players selected.

The Eagles, because of previous trades made, had to wait until the 3rd round for their first pick. They would only have 7 picks and of these 7 players selected, 5 made the team and played during the season. With the 66th pick the Eagles as their first pick in the draft the Philadelphia Eagles selected Reggie Wilkes, a linebacker out of Georgia Tech.

The number 1 overall pick in the draft was taken by the Houston Oilers who selected the 1977 Heisman Trophy winner, Earl Campbell a running back out of the University of Texas

Future Pro Football Hall of Fame inductee, in 2006, Warren Moon, a quarterback from the University of Washington, went undrafted. Moon is also in the Canadian Football League’s Hall of Fame.

=== Player selections ===
The table shows the Eagles selections and what picks they had that were traded away and the team that ended up with that pick. It is possible the Eagles' pick ended up with this team via another team that the Eagles made a trade with. Not shown are acquired picks that the Eagles traded away.

= Pro Bowler	= Hall of Famer

Round	Pick	Player	Position	School
1	8	_{Pick Traded to} Cincinnati Bengals		
2	35	_{Pick Traded to} Cincinnati Bengals		
3	66	Reggie Wilkes	Linebacker	Georgia Tech
4	92	Dennis Harrison	Defensive tackle	Vanderbilt
5	118	_{Pick Traded to Kansas City Chiefs}		
5	130	Norris Banks _{Acquired Pick}	Running back	Kansas
6	145	_{Pick Traded to Buffalo Bills}		
7	176	_{Pick Traded to Oakland Raiders}		
7	186	Greg Marshall _{Acquired Vikings Pick}	Defensive tackle	Oregon State
8	204	_{Pick traded to Minnesota Vikings}		
9	230	Charles Williams	Defensive back	Jackson State
10	261	_{Pick traded to Cleveland Browns}		
11	288	Billy Campfield	Running back	Kansas
12	315	Mark Slater	Center	Minnesota

=== Undrafted free agents ===
1978 undrafted free agents of note
Player	Position	College
Rene Anderson	Cornerback	Nebraska
Ken Clarke	Defensive tackle	Syracuse
Walt Howard	Tight end	Wyoming
Ben Norman	Running back	Colorado State
Mike Osborn	Linebacker	Kansas State
Dan Rains	Linebacker	Cincinnati
Bob Reich	Safety	Penn
Jim Walton	Punter	Boston College
Brenard Wilson	Safety	Vanderbilt
Randy Williamson	Wide receiver	Tennessee State

=== Preseason ===
- On August 5, the NFL played its first game in Mexico City. The New Orleans Saints defeated the Eagles by a score of 14–7.

== Personnel ==
=== Staff / Coaches ===
1978 Philadelphia Eagles staff
Front office: Owner – Leonard Tose; General manager – Jim Murray; Head coaches: Head coach – Dick Vermeil; Offensive coaches: Offensive Coordinator - John Ralston; Quarterbacks / Quality Control – Sid Gillman; Running Backs – Johnny Roland; Receivers – Dick Coury; Tight Ends – Bill Davis, Sr.; Offensive Line – Duane Putnam; Offensive Line – Ken Iman	Defensive coaches: Defensive Coordinator – Marion Campbell; Defensive Line – Chuck Clausen; Linebackers – Bill McPherson; Defensive Backs / Secondary – Fred Bruney; Special teams coaches: Special Teams – Ken Iman

=== Roster ===
1978 Philadelphia Eagles roster
Quarterbacks (QB): 7 Ron Jaworski; 11 John Walton; Running backs (RB): 38 Larry Barnes; 37 Billy Campfield; 30 Cleveland Franklin; 33 Louie Giammona; 35 Mike Hogan; 31 Wilbert Montgomery; Wide receivers (WR): 17 Harold Carmichael; 81 Oren Middlebrook; 83 Vince Papale; 82 Ken Payne; 85 Charlie Smith; Tight ends (TE): 88 Bill Larson; 86 Richard Osborne	Offensive linemen (OL): 53 Dennis Franks C; 64 Ed George T; 72 Wade Key G; 63 Tom Luken G; 50 Guy Morriss C; 69 Woody Peoples G; 76 Jerry Sisemore T; 75 Stan Walters T; Defensive linemen (DL): 67 Lem Burnham DE; 71 Ken Clarke NT; 78 Carl Hairston DE; 68 Dennis Harrison DE; 65 Charlie Johnson NT; 79 Manny Sistrunk DE	Linebackers (LB): 66 Bill Bergey ILB; 55 Frank LeMaster ILB; 54 Drew Mahalic OLB; 57 Mike Osborn OLB; 52 Ray Phillips OLB; 58 Terry Tautolo ILB; 51 Reggie Wilkes OLB; Defensive backs (DB): 25 Bill Bryant CB; 46 Herm Edwards CB; 23 Bob Howard CB; 49 Eric Johnson SS; 41 Randy Logan SS; 20 John Outlaw CB; 26 Deac Sanders FS; 21 John Sciarra CB/FS; Special teams (ST): 2 Mike Michel P/K	Reserve: 34 James Betterson RB (IR); 95 John Bunting LB (IR); 89 Wally Henry WR (IR); 84 Keith Krepfle TE (IR); 32 Herb Lusk RB (IR); 1 Nick Mike-Mayer K (IR); 47 Charles Williams CB (IR); Rookies in italics

== Regular season ==
=== Schedule ===
Week	Date	Opponent	Result	Record	Venue	Attendance
1	September 3	Los Angeles Rams	**L** 14–16	0–1	Veterans Stadium	64,721
2	September 10	at **Washington Redskins**	**L** 30–35	0–2	RFK Stadium	54,380
3	September 17	at New Orleans Saints	**W** 24–17	1–2	Louisiana Superdome	49,242
4	September 24	Miami Dolphins	**W** 17–3	2–2	Veterans Stadium	62,998
5	October 1	at Baltimore Colts	**W** 17–14	3–2	Memorial Stadium	50,314
6	October 8	at New England Patriots	**L** 14–24	3–3	Schaefer Stadium	61,016
7	October 15	**Washington Redskins**	**W** 17–10	4–3	Veterans Stadium	65,722
8	October 22	at **Dallas Cowboys**	**L** 7–14	4–4	Texas Stadium	60,525
9	October 29	**St. Louis Cardinals**	**L** 10–16	4–5	Veterans Stadium	62,989
10	November 5	Green Bay Packers	**W** 10–3	5–5	Veterans Stadium	64,214
11	November 12	New York Jets	**W** 17–9	6–5	Veterans Stadium	60,249
12	November 19	at **New York Giants**	**W** 19–17	7–5	Giants Stadium	70,318
13	November 26	at **St. Louis Cardinals**	**W** 14–10	8–5	Busch Memorial Stadium	39,693
14	December 3	at Minnesota Vikings	**L** 27–28	8–6	Metropolitan Stadium	38,722
15	December 10	**Dallas Cowboys**	**L** 13–31	8–7	Veterans Stadium	64,667
16	December 17	**New York Giants**	**W** 20–3	9–7	Veterans Stadium	56,396

Note: Intra-division opponents are in bold text.

== Game recap ==
=== Week 1 vs LA Rams ===
Week 1: Philadelphia Eagles vs Los Angeles Rams

Quarter	1	2	3	4	Total
Rams	3	3	0	10	16
Eagles	0	0	0	14	14

at Veterans Stadium on AstroTurf,

- Date: September 3, 1978
- Game time: 1:00 p.m. EST
- Game weather: 76 °F (24.4 °C), wind 9 miles per hour (14 km/h; 7.8 kn)
- Referee: Gordon McCarter

Game information

First quarter

- Rams – Frank Corral 29-yard field goal, Rams 3–0

Second quarter

- Rams – Frank Corral 47-yard field goal, Rams 6–0

Third quarter

- No scoring plays

Fourth quarter

- Rams – Nolan Cromwell 0-yard fumble return (Frank Corral kick), Rams 13–0
- Eagles – Ken Payne 24-yard pass from Ron Jaworski (Nick Mike-Mayer kick) Rams 13–7
- Eagles – Wally Henry 57-yard punt return (Nick Mike-Mayer kick), Eagles 14–13
- Rams – Frank Corral 46-yard field goal, Rams 16–14

Passing

- Eagles – Ron Jaworski: 7 of 17 for 102 yards, 1 TD, 1 ints
- Rams – Pat Haden: 14 of 33 for 154 yards, O TD, 0 ints

Rushing

- Eagles – 30 Att, 128 Yards, 0 TDS
- Wilbert Montgomery, 12 Att, 46 yards, 1 TD
- Rams – 33 Att, 103 Yards, 0 TDS
- Wendell tyler – 10 Att, 36 yards, 0 TD

Receiving

- Eagles – Harold Carmichael: 1 rec, 32 yards, 0 TD
- Rams – Willie Miller: 3 rec, 44 yards, 0 TD

NFC East Standing

- Dallas, New York & Washington (1–0); Philadelphia & St. Louis (0–1)

=== Week 3 at NO Saints ===
- Television: CBS
- Announcers: Gary Bender and Hank Stram

Former Youngstown State University star Ron Jaworski threw three touchdown passes two to Harold Carmichael one from 6 yards and the other from 18 yards as the Eagles got their first win of the season. The bitterness stemmed from the fact that one of their teammates, kick return specialist Wally Henry, suffered a broken leg when he hit illegally from behind. Henry was playing on the kickoff team in the third quarter when he was hit and carried from the field. Only minutes earlier, he had set up a touchdown with a 55-yard punt return to the Saints 20-yard line. The Eagles also had a 20-yard touchdown pass from Jaworski to Keith Krepfle and a Nick Mike-Mayer 21-yard field goal. The Saints also scored with a 47-yard pass from Archie Manning to Tinker Owens Touchdown connection, a nine-yard score from fullback Tony Galbreath and a 21-yard field goal by Rich Szaro. The Eagles had to make two last minute interceptions to halt the Saints drive to a tying score.

=== Week 5 at Baltimore Colts ===
- Television: CBS
- Announcers: Tim Ryan, Tom Matte and Roman Gabriel

Colts quarterback Bill Troup moved Baltimore 71 yards in nine plays for the first touchdown, on a two-yard run by Roosevelt Leaks, the drive started after Nick Mike Mayer missed a 46-yard field goal. Two plays later the Colts have the ball again when Philadelphia quarterback Ron Jaworski fumbled and defensive end John Dutton recovered at the Eagles 38. Pass interference on a razzle-dazzle play in which running back Joe Washington took a handoff and pitches back to Troup who then threw a pass to Roger Carr, put the ball on the Eagles 1 yard line but couldn't score. They quickly got another chance when Wilbert Montgomery fumbled and Derrell Luce recovered the ball and carried it to the 4 where Troup threw to Leaks for a 14-0 Colts lead. But the Eagles came back roaring in the 4th quarter when Jaworski threw a 20-yard pass to Krepfle and then Mayer kick a 26-yard chip shot and then Montgomery who rushed for 144 yards on the day scored a 14-yard touchdown run with 2:39 left in the game to secure a must win for the Eagles who now trail the Redskins by 2 games (5-0) in the NFC East standings.

=== Week 9 vs St. Louis Cardinals ===
The St. Louis Cardinals come into the game with a win–loss record of 0–8 against the 4th place, 4 wins and 4 losses Philadelphia Eagles.

Week 9: Philadelphia Eagles vs St. Louis Cardinals

Quarter	1	2	3	4	Total
Cardinals	0	13	0	3	16
Eagles	0	10	0	0	10

at Veterans Stadium on AstroTurf,

- Date: October 29, 1978
- Game time: 1:00 p.m. EST
- Game weather: 52 °F (11.1 °C), wind 8 miles per hour (13 km/h; 7.0 kn)

Game information

First quarter

- No scoring plays

Second quarter

- Eagles – Nick Mike-Mayer 25-yard field goal, Eagles 3 – 0
- Cardinals – Jim Otis 7-yard rush (kick failed) Cardinals 6 – 3,
- Eagles – Harold Carmichael 33-yard pass from Ron Jaworski (Nick Mike-Mayer kick), Eagles 10 – 6
- Cardinals – Dave Stief 55-yard pass from Jim Hart (Jim Bakken kick) Cardinals 13 – 10

Third quarter

- No scoring plays

Fourth quarter

- Cardinals – Jim Bakken 31-yard field goal Cardinals 16 – 10

NFC East Standing

- Washington (7–2)
- Dallas (6–3)
- New York (5–4)
- Philadelphia (4–5)
- St. Louis (1–8)

Passing

- Eagles – Ron Jaworski: 21 of 40 for 231 yards, 1 TD, 1 ints
- Cardinals – Jim Hart: 12 of 24 for 260 yards, 1 TD, 3 ints

Rushing

- Eagles – 28 Att, 132 Yards, 0 TDS
- Billy Campfield, 10 Att, 74 yards, 0 TD
- Cardinals – 35 Att, 94 Yards, 1 TDS
- Jim otis – 22 Att, 72 yards, 1 TD

Receiving

- Eagles – Harold Carmichael: 7 rec, 126 yards, 1 TD
- Cardinals – Mel Gray: 2 rec, 76 yards, 0 TD

Team Stats STL PHI

- First downs STL 15 – PHIL 19
- Rush-yards-TDs STL 35–94–1 – PHIL 28–132–0
- Comp-Att-Yd-TD-INT
- STL 12–24–260–1–3
- PHIL 21–40–231–1–3
- Sacked-yards STL 0–0 – PHIL 2–11
- Net pass yards STL 260 – PHIL 220
- Total yards STL 354 – PHIL 352
- Fumbles-lost STL 4–0 – PHIL 4–2
- Turnovers STL 3 – PHIL 5
- Penalties-yards STL 7–53 – PHIL 6–45

=== Week 11 vs NY Jets ===
Week 11: Philadelphia Eagles vs New York Jets

Quarter	1	2	3	4	Total
Jets	0	3	6	0	9
Eagles	0	7	3	7	17

at Veterans Stadium on AstroTurf,

- Date: November 12, 1978
- Game time: 1:00 p.m. EST
- Game weather: 50 °F (10 °C), wind 9 miles per hour (14 km/h; 7.8 kn)
- Referee: Jerry Markbreit

Game information

First quarter

- No scoring plays

Second quarter

- Rams – Frank Corral 47-yard field goal, Rams 6 – 0
- Eagles – Harold Carmichael 18-yard pass from Ron Jaworski (Nick Mike-Mayer kick) Eagles 7 – 3

Third quarter

- Eagles – Nick Mike-Mayer 39-yard field goal Eagles 10 – 3
- Jets Kevin Long 5-yard rush (kick failed) Eagles 10 – 9

Fourth quarter

- Jets – Pat Leahy 41-yard field goal Jets 3–0
- Eagles – Harold Carmichael 6-yard pass from Ron Jaworski (Nick Mike-Mayer kick) Eagles 17 – 9

NFC East Standing

- Washington (8–3)
- Dallas (7–4)
- Philadelphia (6–5)
- New York & (5–6)
- St. Louis (3–8)

Other teams

- Los Angeles (9–2) Leads NFC West
- Atlanta (7–4)
- Green Bay (7–4)
- Minnrsota (7–4)

Passing

- Eagles – Ron Jaworski: 13 of 23 for 135 yards, 2 TD, 1 ints
- Jets – Matt Robinson: 10 of 23 for 143 yards, O TD, 2 ints

Rushing

- Eagles – 43 Att, 154 Yards, 0 TDS
- Billy Campfield: 22 Att, 92 yards, 0 TD
- Jets – 33 Att, 108 Yards, 1 TDS
- Kevin Long: 15 Att, 62 yards, 1 TD

Receiving

- Eagles – Harold Carmichael: 3 rec, 45 yards, 2 TD
- Rams – Willie Miller: 5 rec, 88 yards, 0 TD

=== Week 12 ===
Philadelphia Eagles (6–5) at New York Giants (5–6)

Quarter	1	2	3	4	Total
Eagles	0	6	0	13	19
Giants	14	0	3	0	17

at Giants Stadium • East Rutherford, New Jersey

- Date: November 19
- Game time: 1:00 p.m. EST
- Game weather: 49 °F (9.4 °C) • Wind 14 miles per hour (23 km/h; 12 kn)
- Game attendance: 70,318
- Referee: Cal Lepore
- Pro-Football-Reference.com

Game information

Eagles

- Ron Jaworski
  15/31, 164 Yds, 3 INT
- Wilbert Montgomery
  22 Rush, 88 Yds, TD
- Harold Carmichael
  5 Rec, 105 Yds

Giants

- Joe Pisarcik
  13/24, 181 Yds, 2 TD, INT
- Doug Kotar
  13 Rush, 36 Yds
- Jim Robinson
  4 Rec, 73 Yds

The Miracle at the Meadowlands is the term used by sportscasters and Philadelphia Eagles fans for a fumble recovery by cornerback Herman Edwards that he returned for a touchdown at the end of a November 19, 1978 NFL game against the New York Giants in Giants Stadium. It was seen as miraculous because it occurred at a point in the game when the Giants were easily capable of running out the game's final seconds. The Giants had the ball, and the Eagles had no timeouts left. Everyone watching expected quarterback Joe Pisarcik to take one more snap and kneel with the ball, thus running out the clock and preserving a 17–12 Giant upset. Instead, he attempted to hand it off to fullback Larry Csonka and botched it, allowing Edwards to pick up the ball and run 26 yards for the winning score.

Scoring summary

Quarter	Time	Drive			Team	Scoring information	Score	
Quarter	Time	Plays	Yards	TOP	Team	Scoring information	PHI	NYG
1					Giants	Hammond 19-yard touchdown reception from Pisarcik, Danelo kick good	0	7
1					Giants	Perkins 30-yard touchdown reception from Pisarcik, Danelo kick good	0	14
2					Eagles	Montgomery 8-yard touchdown run, kick no good	6	14
3					Giants	37-yard field goal by Danelo	6	17
4					Eagles	Hogan 1-yard touchdown run, kick no good	12	17
4	0:20				Eagles	Fumble recovery returned 26 yards for touchdown by Herm Edwards, Michel kick good	19	17
"TOP" = time of possession. For other American football terms, see Glossary of American football.							19	17

=== Week 13 at St. Louis Cardinals ===
After the games of week 11 the Philadelphia Eagles' outlook of being an NFC playoff team was slim. They were in 3rd place in the NFC East and behind 4 teams for a Wild Card team spot. That was some of the reasoning why the placekicking duties were given to the punter Mike Michel when regular kicker Nick Mick-Meyer got hurt. At the end of week 13 the Eagles found themselves trailing division leading Dallas by one game, and tied with the Atlanta Falcons and Washington Redskins for 1 of 2 Wild Card team playoff spots.

Week 13: Philadelphia Eagles at St. Louis Cardinals – Game summary

Quarter	1	2	3	4	Total
Eagles	0	7	0	7	14
Cardinals	3	0	0	7	10

at Busch Memorial Stadium on AstroTurf,

- Date: November 26, 1978
- Game time: 1:00 p.m. EST
- Game weather: 43 °F (6.1 °C), wind 15 miles per hour (24 km/h; 13 kn)
- Referee: Pat Haggerty

Game information

First quarter

- Cardinals – Jim Bakken 32-yard field goal, Cardinals 3 – 0

Second quarter

- Eagles – Charlie A. Smith 22-yard pass from Ron Jaworski (Mike Michel kick) Eagles 7 – 3

Third quarter

- No scoring plays

Fourth quarter

- Eagles – Mike Hogan 2-yard rush (Mike Michel kick), Eagles 14 – 3
- Cardinals – Pat Tilley 1-yard pass from Jim Hart (Jim Bakken kick), Eagles 14 – 10

NFC East Standing

- Dallas (9–4)
- Eagles (8–5)
- Washington (8–5)
- Giants (5–8)
- Cardinals (4–9)

Other teams

- Atlanta (8–5)
- Minnesota (7–5–1)
- Green Bay (7–5–1)

Passing

- Eagles – Ron Jaworski: 15 of 31 for 164 yds, 0 tds, 3 ints
- Cardinals – Joe Pisarcik: 13 of 23 for 181 yds, 2 tds, 1 ints

Rushing

- Eagles – 45–150–2, Wilbert Montgomery, 22 Att, 88 yards, 1 TD
- Cardinals – 31–100–0, Doug Kotar – 13 Att, 36 yards, 0 TD

Receiving

- Eagles – Harold Carmichael: 5 rec, 105 yards, 0 TD
- Cardinals – Jim Robinson: 4 rec, 73 yards, 0 TD

Team Stats

- First downs PHIL 15 – ST L 17
- Rush-yards-TDs PHIL 37–95–1 – ST L 25–102–0
- Comp-Att-Yd-TD-INT
- PHIL 13–25–156–1–0
- ST L 20–37–197–1–2
- Sacked-yards PHIL 1–7 – ST L 1–5
- Net pass yards PHIL 149 – ST L 192
- Total yards PHIL 244 – ST L 294
- Fumbles-lost PHIL 1–0 – ST L 2–1
- Turnovers PHIL 0 – ST L 3
- Penalties-yards PHIL 8–74 – ST L 3–25

=== Standings ===
The Eagles were hampered by the loss of their placekicker (Nick Mike-Mayer) in the closing weeks of the season and his replacement (punter Mike Michel) missed an extra point kick in each of the last three games of the season.

NFC East
	W	L	T	PCT	DIV	CONF	PF	PA	STK
Dallas Cowboys^{(2)}	12	4	0	.750	7–1	9–3	384	208	W6
Philadelphia Eagles^{(5)}	9	7	0	.563	4–4	6–6	270	250	W1
Washington Redskins	8	8	0	.500	4–4	6–6	273	283	L5
St. Louis Cardinals	6	10	0	.375	3–5	6–6	248	296	W1
New York Giants	6	10	0	.375	2–6	5–9	264	298	L1

== Postseason ==
=== Schedule ===
Round	Date	Opponent (seed)	Result	Record	Venue	Recap
Wild Card	December 24, 1978	at Atlanta Falcons (4)	L 13–14	0–1	Atlanta–Fulton County Stadium	Recap

=== Game summaries ===
==== NFC Wild Card Playoffs: at (4) Atlanta Falcons ====
NFC Wild Card Playoffs: (5) Philadelphia Eagles at (4) Atlanta Falcons – Game summary

Quarter	1	2	3	4	Total
Eagles	6	0	7	0	13
Falcons	0	0	0	14	14

at Atlanta–Fulton County Stadium, Atlanta

- Date: December 24, 1978
- Game time: 12:30 p.m. EST
- Game attendance: 49,447
- Referee: Fred Silva
- TV announcers (CBS): Gary Bender and Hank Stram

Game information

First quarter

- PHI – Harold Carmichael 13-yard pass from Ron Jaworski (kick missed). Eagles 6–0.

Second quarter

- No scoring plays.

Third quarter

- PHI – Wilbert Montgomery 1-yard run (Mike Michel kick). Eagles 13–0.

Fourth quarter

- ATL – Jim Mitchell 20-yard pass from Steve Bartkowski (Tim Mazzetti kick). Eagles 13–7.
- ATL – Wallace Francis 37-yard pass from Steve Bartkowski (Tim Mazzetti kick). Falcons 14–13.

Top passers

- PHI – Ron Jaworski – 19/35, 190 yards, TD
- ATL – Steve Bartkowski – 18/32, 243 yards, 2 TD, 2 INT

Top rushers

- PHI – Mike Hogan – 14 rushes, 31 yards
- ATL – Haskel Stanback – 16 rushes, 58 yards

Top receivers

- PHI – Charlie Smith – 7 receptions, 108 yards
- ATL – Wallace Francis – 6 receptions, 135 yards, TD

The Falcons won their first playoff game in team history after they overcame a 13–0 deficit by scoring 2 touchdowns in the final 5 minutes of the game. Punter Mike Michel, who took over placekicker duties when regular placekicker Nick Mike-Mayer got injured in week 12, missed a possible game-winning 34-yard field goal in the closing seconds.

== Awards and honors ==
- UPI Coach of the Year: Dick Vermeil

League leaders

- Harold Carmichael, NFC Leader, Receiving Yards – 1072
- Wilbert Montgomery, NFC Leader, Rushing Avg – 4.6
