= Miracle at the Meadowlands =

Fumble that allowed Philadelphia Eagles to win a 1978 game over the New York Giants

- Herman Edwards recovers Joe Pisarcik's fumble.
Philadelphia Eagles (6–5)	New York Giants (5–6)
19	17
Head coach: Dick Vermeil	Head coach: John McVay
	1	2	3	4	Total
PHI	0	6	0	13	19
NYG	14	0	3	0	17
- Date: November 19, 1978
- Stadium: Giants Stadium; East Rutherford, New Jersey, U.S.
- Referee: Cal Lepore
- Attendance: 70,318

TV in the United States
- Network: CBS
- Announcers: Don Criqui and Sonny Jurgensen

The Miracle at the Meadowlands was a fumble recovery by cornerback Herman Edwards of the Philadelphia Eagles that he returned for a touchdown at the end of a November 19, 1978, National Football League (NFL) game against the New York Giants in Giants Stadium. After quarterback Joe Pisarcik botched an attempt to hand off the football to fullback Larry Csonka, Edwards picked up the dropped ball and ran 26 yards for the winning touchdown. It is considered miraculous because the Giants were ahead 17–12 and could easily have run out the final seconds since they had the ball and the Eagles had no timeouts left.

The term "Miracle at the Meadowlands" is primarily used by Eagles fans and sportscasters. Giants fans refer to the play simply as "The Fumble", though that name is generally used outside of New York City for a play in the 1987 AFC Championship Game between the Cleveland Browns and Denver Broncos.

For the Eagles, the victory snatched from the jaws of certain defeat served as a morale boost, leading that season to a playoff berth and, two seasons later, the franchise's first Super Bowl appearance. To Giants fans, it was the nadir of a long era of poor results, but the aftermath of this would lead to major changes that proved beneficial for the franchise in the long run. For the sport in general, the main legacy of the game was its contribution to the adoption and acceptance of the quarterback kneel as the standard method for winning teams in possession of the ball to end games under the appropriate set of circumstances.

== Background ==
The Miracle at the Meadowlands occurred at the end of a game between the New York Giants and the visiting Philadelphia Eagles, which was the first meeting between the divisional rivals in the 1978 season. The Eagles were in third place in the NFC East, behind the Dallas Cowboys and Washington Redskins; the Giants were in fourth. The teams went into the game in similar situations, but heading in different directions. Both had playoff hopes, especially since this was the first 16-game NFL season, but likely would have to settle for a wild card berth due to the solid lead the powerful Cowboys had in the division. Given the similarity of their records it was likely the outcome would have playoff implications, since the first tie-breaker for a wild card spot is the head-to-head record.

=== Giants ===
Going into the game, the Giants were 5–6. A three-game losing streak on the road had made the team's playoff prospects much dimmer since midseason. However, a win at home against the favored Eagles could, the team hoped, reverse the trend and keep an outside shot at a playoff spot alive.

Despite the team's storied past, the Giants had not played in the postseason since 1963 and had managed only two winning seasons since then. Although they were the league's fourth oldest franchise, they were, up to that point in time, almost a non-entity in the post-merger National Football League (NFL). Their move to New Jersey in 1976 had alienated some longtime fans, even if it made more seats available. Most living Giants fans had never gone this long without a contender, but despite this, they were still forgiving. However, there was little pressure the fans could bring to bear on the people who could ultimately make changes, longtime team owners Wellington Mara and the heirs of his brother Jack. Notably, while Wellington's nephew Timothy J. Mara had legally inherited only a one-sixth stake in the Giants along with his mother and sister after Jack Mara's death in 1965, in practice the latter two women took no part in the team's day-to-day affairs and allowed Timothy to speak for their interests as well as his own. This effectively made Timothy an equal partner in the same way his father had been.

Wellington and Timothy managed team operations closely but feuded so bitterly with each other that at one point a partition had to be erected between their seats in the owners' box. Nevertheless, while the owners bitterly disagreed on personnel matters in principle, they both generally endeavored to keep payroll costs as low as possible, not only in terms of player salaries but also when it came to coaching and scouting. In the post-merger era prior to the introduction of free agency, Giants players had limited bargaining power, so it was arguably the owners' reluctance to commit the resources other teams already were to non-playing personnel that was of greater long-term detriment to the team's on-field performance. The effects of the Maras' parsimony, combined with the uncertainty and instability at the highest managerial level, affected the team's play, most significantly when it came to some apparently inexplicable personnel decisions.

It was not lost on fans that players (including Craig Morton and Fran Tarkenton) and coaches (including Tom Landry and Vince Lombardi) who had once been in the Giants' fold were now enjoying, or had enjoyed, great success elsewhere. The team also had passed over future stars for lesser, or ultimately failed, players in the annual draft, or worse, traded away high draft picks who became stars. The most egregious instance of the latter was when the Giants traded their first round selection in the 1975 draft to the Cowboys for Morton. The Giants' 2-12 1974 season handed Dallas the No. 2 overall pick, which the Cowboys used to select future Hall of Fame defensive tackle Randy White from Maryland. Morton was dealt to the Broncos in 1977 and promptly led the Broncos to Super Bowl XII.

The Giants played in the largest metropolitan area in the United States, and there was still far greater demand for tickets than there were available even in the face of competition from the AFC's New York Jets. Despite the Jets' upset win in Super Bowl III and that team still playing at Shea Stadium in Queens, the Giants were still widely regarded as New York's pre-eminent football team. Moreover, the Dallas Cowboys and Washington Redskins had dominated the NFC East in the years following the merger. For most of the 1970s, only the division winners and one wild card team per conference made the playoffs, and until the introduction of the wild card round in 1978 there was no possibility of a wild card team hosting a playoff game. Furthermore, NFL playoff television revenues were shared equally regardless of which teams were playing. Thus, the most meaningful prospect of financial return available to the Maras in return for a winning team would have been the revenue from home playoff games, which until 1978 would have required the Giants to (at the very least) win the NFC East title. From a purely financial perspective, the expenditure required to overcome the Cowboys' dominance appeared to be, at best, a reckless and needless gamble.

The Maras therefore apparently felt little or no financial incentive to spend more money in an effort to build a championship contender. As things stood, minimizing expenses seemed to ensure the franchise would remain highly profitable no matter how poorly the team performed on the field, whereas spending more money offered no obvious guarantee of additional financial return even if it made the team more competitive. Due to the Giants' continued success at the box office, the Maras eventually came to be viewed as complacent and miserly owners by observers who were unaware of the full extent of the ownership schism.

==== Friction between offensive players and assistant coaches ====
The week before the game, Giants players, particularly on offense, had complained to reporters about the team's assistant coaches. Head coach John McVay was popular with the players; he had taken the role in the middle of the 1976 season after Bill Arnsparger was fired, and improved morale while adding talented players to the team. However, the players were not so enthusiastic about many of the longtime friends he had hired as assistants.

The players felt the assistant coaches were uninterested in helping younger players develop, at least compared to their counterparts on other teams. As an example, they pointed out that the season before, while none of the team's three quarterbacks had had any previous NFL experience, no quarterback coach had been hired. They also noted that one of the few coaches who seemed to care about this situation, Jerry Wampfler, coached the offensive line, one of the Giants' most improved units that season.

Offensive coordinator Bob Gibson was the most frequent target of complaints: he had taken to the relatively nascent practice (now almost universal) of calling all the plays from the upstairs press box, to the point of Joe Pisarcik openly challenging Gibson over the previous two seasons. The players felt that Gibson should let Pisarcik call plays; during the previous week's loss to Washington, the Giants had attempted only three passes on several third-and-long situations during the game. Players also felt insulted that on a third-and-7 in overtime, the coaches had called a run play. Gibson, for his part, had limited confidence in Pisarcik's passing ability, an opinion widely shared (the local media in New York City referred to him as "off-Broadway Joe," a sarcastic reference to former Jets quarterback "Broadway Joe" Namath), with Gibson and other coaches responding to this criticism by pointing out the three passing attempts the players referred to had resulted in two interceptions and a sack for an 11-yard loss.

The team's general philosophy at the time was to concentrate on its improving defense and playing conservatively on offense until it could be made more competitive. Players on the offense became frustrated over this decision and wanted more chances to prove themselves.

=== Eagles ===
At 6–5, things looked a little more promising for the Eagles. The two-game win streak they took into the game had gotten them over a .500 first half. Momentum clearly was on their side, and the Giants had not beaten the Eagles since the opening game of the 1975 season, three years prior.

Still, the Giants were a decent team, and the Eagles knew they could not relax. They, too, were an old-line NFL franchise coming off many years in the doldrums. The Eagles had not been to the playoffs since winning their third NFL title in 1960 and had only notched two winning seasons in the seventeen years since then, with the last coming in 1966.

However, Eagles fans were less inclined to be forgiving than Giants fans. The impatience of Eagles fans was certainly not helped by the success of their cross-state rival Pittsburgh Steelers, who after decades of being also-rans in the pre-merger NFL had become perennial Super Bowl contenders, winning championships in 1974 and 1975, after moving to the American Football Conference (AFC). Additionally, Philadelphia's other professional teams, the Phillies (MLB), 76ers (NBA) and Flyers (NHL), were among the best teams in their respective leagues.

A loss to the slumping Giants would have dealt a severe blow to the confidence the team needed to maintain over the last quarter of its schedule, in which it would face not only the Cowboys, but the equally formidable Minnesota Vikings as well as the Giants again in Philadelphia. 1978 was also viewed as an important season for head coach Dick Vermeil, as there was little doubt the Eagles were playing much better under his watch, but there was also a great deal of local impatience for concrete results.

== The game ==
1978 Week Twelve: Philadelphia Eagles at New York Giants — Game Summary

Quarter	1	2	3	4	Total
Eagles	0	6	0	13	19
Giants	14	0	3	0	17

at Giants Stadium

- Date: November 19
- Game time: 1:00 p.m. EST
- Game weather: 49 °F (9 °C), Clear
- Game attendance: 70,318
- Referee: Cal Lepore
- TV announcers (CBS): Don Criqui and Sonny Jurgensen

Game information

First quarter

- NYG Bobby Hammond 19-yard pass from Pisarcik (Joe Danelo kick)
- NYG Johnny Perkins 30-yard pass from Pisarcik (Danelo kick)

Second quarter

- PHI Montgomery 8-yard rush (kick failed)

Third quarter

- NYG Danelo 37-yard FG

Fourth quarter

- PHI Mike Hogan 1-yard rush (kick failed)
- PHI Herm Edwards 26-yard fumble return (Mike Michel kick)

Top passers

- PHI – Ron Jaworski – 15/31, 164 YDS, 0 TD, 3 INT
- NYG – Joe Pisarcik – 13/23, 181 YDS, 2 TD, INT

Top rushers

- PHI – Wilbert Montgomery – 22 CAR, 88 YDS, TD
- NYG – Doug Kotar – 13 CAR, 36 YDS

Top receivers

- PHI – Harold Carmichael – 5 REC, 105 YDS
- NYG – Jimmy Robinson – 4 REC, 73 YDS

The Giants opened a two-touchdown lead in the first quarter on two Pisarcik touchdown passes. The Eagles, conversely, struggled, missing one of their extra point attempts and botching the snap on the other. The Eagles found themselves down 17–12, meaning they could only win the game with a touchdown as time wound down.

Deep in their own territory, the Giants' Doug Kotar fumbled late in the fourth quarter, and the Eagles recovered, raising hopes of a comeback by the visitors. Those were quickly put to rest, however, when rookie defensive back Odis McKinney's first NFL interception gave the Giants possession of the football after the two-minute warning. Additionally, the Eagles had exhausted all their timeouts by this point.

Fans in the stands began heading for the exits as the game seemed all but over, with no apparent remaining danger of an Eagles comeback. Nowadays, teams in this situation let the play clock run down to the last possible second and have the quarterback take a knee. On the sidelines, a disgusted Vermeil turned his attention away from the field and toward the postgame press conference, where he would have to explain to reporters why his team had fallen to an inferior opponent.

=== The Giants' possession ===
Since the rule to allow quarterbacks to simply kneel would not take effect until 1987, Pisarcik took the snap on first down and rolled on the ground (a common play for quarterbacks in the pre-kneel era). Eagles middle linebacker Bill Bergey charged into Giants' center Jim Clack, knocking him backward into Pisarcik in a desperate attempt to force a fumble. Since defensive players usually are not blocked in this situation, they usually in turn do not rush. Offensive players consider any breach of this tacit agreement as a provocation, particularly linemen whose job it is to protect the quarterback, and fights between angry linemen and the opposition were not uncommon.

Gibson did not want to expose his quarterback to further risk of injury, nor did he want to risk his players being fined for violating the NFL's rules against fighting. Most importantly, the last thing he wanted was for his team to get a penalty, which could stop the clock and require getting another first down to secure the win. Gibson also personally despised the kneeling play, considering it unsporting and somewhat dishonorable (a view popular among a lot of coaches of the period). Also, given that the play clock at the time was only thirty seconds (as it would remain through the 1987 season), a play had to be run. So, on second down he called "65 Power-Up," a standard play which called for Csonka to take a handoff and run up the middle. He then proceeded to do so, for a gain of 11 yards, and Gibson called the same play again.

In the huddle, the Giants were incredulous when the call came in. "Don't give me the ball," begged Csonka. Other players asked Pisarcik to change the play, but he demurred. Gibson had berated him for changing a play the week before and threatened to have him waived if he ever did so again. Gibson did not take the time to explain his decision to Pisarcik. As a result, the rest of the offense simply viewed Gibson's call as a power trip. Because he was a second-year starting quarterback who still had not totally proven himself, in the era before free agency, Pisarcik lacked the stature to prevail in this kind of dispute. Csonka claims that, as he walked away from the huddle, he told Pisarcik he would not take the ball if he went through with it. However, it is not known whether Pisarcik heard him.

Across the line of scrimmage the Eagles had not huddled, as defensive coordinator Marion Campbell called for an all-out 11-man blitz. Herman Edwards, who as a defensive back normally would have been several yards deep, was instead close enough to Kotar to talk to him (the Giants player assured him that his team was just going to kneel again). Vermeil later said the blitz made the victory possible. The Giants wasted several seconds in the huddle in dismay over the play-calling. At the line, Clack saw the play clock winding down and took it upon himself to snap it with thirty-one seconds left in the game to avoid a delay-of-game penalty, which would have stopped the clock and cost the Giants five yards. Had the Giants knelt on the subsequent play, there still would have been one second left on the game clock once the play clock ran down, requiring a fourth-down play to be run (the play clock at the time ran for 30 seconds; it now runs for 40).

Pisarcik, who at the time was distracted making sure Csonka was in position, was unprepared for the snap. It struck his middle finger so hard there was still blood on the nail after the game. Nevertheless, he held on to the ball after a slight bobble and tried to hand it off to Csonka; instead, the ball hit Csonka's hip and came loose.

Edwards recovered the ball on its first bounce as Pisarcik unsuccessfully attempted to fall on it, while Kotar, who could have blocked him or fallen on the ball himself, never even saw the fumble, according to Edwards. Once Edwards got it, he sprinted 26 yards untouched into the end zone for a 19–17 Eagles' lead. There was stunned silence from the stands and the Giants' sideline; the only noise came from the celebrating Eagles fans, players and team officials.

On the subsequent Eagles' kickoff, the Giants were pinned deep in their own territory. Two Pisarcik passes fell incomplete before time expired.

=== The call ===
With a Giants victory all but assured, CBS commentator Don Criqui (working alongside Sonny Jurgensen) had begun to read the end credits for the game's control truck and on-field personnel (which were also being displayed on screen) shortly before the game's final play:

It's Giants' football now, third and two. We thank our producer Bob Rowe, our director Jim Silman, and our CBS crew, spotter and statistician John Mara and Tom McHugh here at Giants Stadium. As the clock winds out on the Philadelphia Eagles, a game they thought would project them into a possible wildcard position, it would bring them 7–5 had they won, but a late interception by the Giants will preserve a Giant victory, an upset win as the Giants lead 17–12, we’re inside thirty seconds, the Eagles have no timeouts. [At this point, the snap and fumble take place.] Wait a minute... here's a free foo- I don't believe it! The Eagles pick it up and Herman Edwards runs it in for a touchdown! An incredible development!

A more famous call of the play was made by Eagles radio announcer Merrill Reese, which has been replayed along with a shot of the play made by NFL Films:

Under thirty seconds left in the game. From here on in, Pisarcik can just fall on the football and there is nothing the Eagles can do. And Pisarcik [the fumble occurs] fumbles the football! It's picked up by Herman Edwards! 15, 10, 5, touchdown Eagles! I don't believe it! I don't believe it!

After the game, while showing league highlights, CBS replayed the play. They showed the reaction of both coaches, while Brent Musburger famously narrated, "A study in contrast!"

According to R.J. Bell of Pregame, the play also meant the point spread of Philadelphia Eagles −2 turned any Giants winning bets into pushes.

After the play, Don Criqui referenced a Week 1 game earlier in the season between the Washington Redskins and the New England Patriots, as the Patriots had attempted to run out the clock by running, and the Redskins forced a fumble return for a touchdown by Brad Dusek.

== Officials ==
- Referee: Cal Lepore (#72)
- Umpire: Dave Hamilton (#42)
- Head linesman: Tony Veteri (#36)
- Line judge: Bob Beeks (#59)
- Back judge: Banks Williams (#99)
- Side judge: Grover Klemmer (#8)
- Field judge: Jack Vaughan (#93)

NOTE: The 1978 season was the first with seven-man officiating crews.

== The immediate aftermath ==
For Edwards, the play was a personal redemption, as he had been burned on one of Pisarcik's early touchdown passes and would have been partially to blame for the loss. It also was his first NFL touchdown. Vermeil refused to question McVay's judgment but allowed that he, too, disliked sitting on the ball to preserve a victory.

Giants fans were enraged; for a football team to lose in that situation was unprecedented. Pisarcik, who belatedly explained to the press, "I never had control," needed a police escort to get to his car. During an NFL Network program about famous on-field bloopers, Csonka said that he immediately had Pisarcik join him on a chartered plane trip to South Florida, where they hung out and fished for a few days before returning to New York.

Gibson was fired the next morning; with angry fans already demanding that someone be held responsible for the debacle, team officials felt they had no other way of saving the season. The stigma of having called the failed play was so great that Gibson never worked in football at any level again; after his firing he moved to Florida, where he subsequently became manager of a local bait shop. He never spoke about the play again for the rest of his life; in 2008, during a telephone call from ESPN, Gibson said: "I haven't talked about the game for thirty years, and I'm not about to start now." Gibson died in 2015.

=== Giants fan reaction ===
Giants fans turned on management and ownership as previously grumbled complaints about the team's ineptitude on and off the field turned into an incessant roar, with their team now being the laughingstock of the league. To fans, the Fumble (a term in use before the end of the week) epitomized the franchise's dysfunction. At a demonstration outside Giants Stadium prior to the next home game against the Los Angeles Rams, many fans threw their tickets into a bonfire.

Morris Spielberg, a Newark furniture dealer, organized a Giants' Fans Committee after running an ad in the Star-Ledger newspaper that drew hundreds of responses. The group met at a hotel near the stadium prior to the team's final home game on December 10 against the St. Louis Cardinals and distributed flyers to pass out to fellow fans during the game. Spielberg had also arranged for an airplane to fly over the stadium with a banner reading, "15 Years of Lousy Football — We've Had Enough." When it came, fans were to chant, "We've had enough."

The Giants posted a 17–0 shutout win, but when the plane came (an hour behind schedule) fans showed that the victory was not enough to make them forget their recent humiliation. There were more than 24,000 empty seats, yet crowd applause and chants briefly stopped play.

== The rest of the season ==
The surprise finish accelerated the directions both teams were taking over the season's final four games. They met in Veterans Stadium in the final regular season game.

=== Eagles ===
Philadelphia was able to extend its win streak to four games the following week, before losing to Dallas and Minnesota. The Eagles managed a season sweep of the Giants with an easy 20–3 victory in the finale to finish 9–7 and snare the second of two wild card spots available under the playoff format at that time. "One play gets you feeling like you have confidence," Edwards explained years later. "You're not worried about losing anymore; now you're thinking about how you can win." The victory over the Giants denied the surprising 8-7-1 Green Bay Packers their first postseason berth in six years.

The Eagles lost the NFC Wild Card Game to the Atlanta Falcons because of another failed extra point, in addition to a missed field goal as time expired. But it gave them and their fans something to build on for the next season. Philadelphia corrected its kicking woes by drafting barefoot Tony Franklin from Texas A&M in 1979. As a rookie, Franklin booted a 59-yard field goal on Monday Night Football against the Cowboys during a 31–21 victory at Texas Stadium.

=== Giants ===
At first, the Giants tried to look ahead and recover, vowing to win their remaining four games and protect McVay's job. Instead, the collapse continued. The next week, the Giants blew a 10-point lead over the 3–9 Buffalo Bills late in the game, giving up 27 points in the fourth quarter to lose 41–17. They would win only one more game the rest of the season, finishing with a 6–10 record. The sweep by Philadelphia ensured the Giants would finish last in the division (tied with the Cardinals) for the third straight season, extending their rut and further angering fans.

== After the season ==
=== Eagles ===
The next year, the Eagles again earned a wild-card spot and then won their first post-merger playoff game over the Chicago Bears before falling to the Tampa Bay Buccaneers. Following that season, the Giants traded Pisarcik to the Eagles for a draft choice. He would finish his career as a backup to Ron Jaworski five years later. Pisarcik's entire NFL career is usually embodied in that play, and while he is sometimes reluctant to talk about it, he admits that at least people remember his name thanks to it.

The Eagles' momentum carried them further in the 1980 season, to the division championship, then the conference title and finally to Super Bowl XV, which they lost 27–10 to the Oakland Raiders at the Superdome in New Orleans. "We won the game at the end, and we went on to the playoffs," Edwards said. "The next thing, we're playing in the Super Bowl." He, too, would find that the play defined his career, even though he remained part of the Eagles' lineup for another seven years before going into coaching after a final season split between the Falcons and Rams.

Vermeil resigned from the Eagles following the strike-shortened 1982 season, citing burnout.

=== Giants ===
McVay's contract expired and, as expected, was not renewed. He said in 2008 that had the Giants won, the team likely would have won two more games, his contract would have been renewed, "and now I'd be dead with a heart attack." McVay never coached again, but went on to a front-office job with the San Francisco 49ers, where he helped develop that team into one of the most dominant of the 1980s and 1990s. His grandson, Sean McVay, coached the Rams to the Super Bowl LVI championship in February 2022.

Andy Robustelli, a former All-Pro defensive end who served as the Giants' director of operations, was also let go. Csonka's contract was up as well. Since McVay, with whom he had played in the World Football League's Memphis Southmen before signing with the Giants, was gone and his career was ending, he decided to return to Miami, site of his past glories, for one final season in 1979. He would win an NFL Comeback Player of the Year award before retiring.

Despite widespread calls to hire Joe Paterno or another successful college coach, the Giants settled on Ray Perkins, then an assistant for the San Diego Chargers, to replace McVay. While Perkins was able to follow the Eagles' lead and build a team that eventually made the playoffs in 1981, the moves that really made a difference for the Giants drew less attention that off-season.

Wellington Mara had been running football operations himself since joining the organization in the late 1930s, long after most teams had hired a general manager. He continued to do so even after becoming part-owner upon the death of his father, Tim, in 1958. While he had delegated some of his authority to Robustelli in 1974 (which effectively made Robustelli the team's first dedicated general manager), he still had the final say in football matters. However, the fan revolt that erupted in the wake of the Fumble made the Maras realize that they needed to delegate most of the decisions that divided them. As with many other team matters, they kept arguing over whom to replace Robustelli; in the off-season, they called on NFL Commissioner Pete Rozelle to mediate. He suggested George Young, then an executive with the Miami Dolphins. Young only took the job after the Maras granted him the title of general manager, with complete control of the football side of the operation. He proved to be a superb judge of talent, drafting Phil Simms, Lawrence Taylor and other future Giants stars over the next few seasons.

In 1981, Perkins hired a new defensive coordinator, Bill Parcells, a New England Patriots assistant who was out of coaching in 1979 after serving as head coach at Air Force in 1978. When Perkins resigned after the 1982 season to succeed the late Bear Bryant at the University of Alabama, Parcells took over as head coach. He survived a disastrous first season to lead the talent Young had acquired to two Super Bowl championships.

== Legacy ==
The Miracle at the Meadowlands has left a lasting impact on the way organized football is played at all levels, not just in the NFL. Most notably, it legitimized the quarterback kneel. Coaches everywhere took heed of Gibson's fate and immediately began instructing quarterbacks to sit on the ball in similar situations. In response, the Arena Football League instituted a rule change stipulating the ball had to be advanced past the line of scrimmage in order for the clock to continue running in the final minute of play: however, outdoor gridiron leagues have not followed suit, and the quarterback kneel would soon be almost universally seen as a polite and sportsmanlike way for a winning football team to bring a game to an honorable conclusion.

In the years that followed, etiquette would further evolve. Today, once the kneel is executed, and the following assumptions are present:

- There is less than forty seconds remaining.

- The offense has at least one more down.

- The defense has insufficient timeouts to affect the outcome.

It is acceptable for the opposing teams to come onto the field to shake hands, etc. even as the game clock is still running down to zero. The quarterback kneel is such a common play that it is sometimes executed by trailing teams that have no realistic prospect of winning as a way to concede defeat and end the game.

=== Formation change ===
Formation used ever since the Fumble/Miracle for quarterback kneel play.

The week after the game, both the Giants and Eagles implemented a new offensive formation to be used only in end-of-game kneeldowns. It is popularly known as the "Victory Formation" or "Victory Offense." Not only did the infamous game-losing play make kneeling acceptable, but most of the teams using it changed how it was done. Prior to Pisarcik's fumble, teams had employed standard offensive formations such as an I or a split backfield. The Eagles' unlikely touchdown, however, had made the weakness of doing so glaring. Even though Pisarcik had been trying to hand off instead of kneeling, when he fumbled the snap, there was not only no offensive player there to try to recover it, but no one was in position to tackle Edwards and prevent the touchdown either.

At the end of the first half of the Bills game the following week, the Giants debuted the new formation when Pisarcik knelt to preserve their lead. Two running backs stood closely behind Pisarcik while a third (usually a speedy player such as a wide receiver) was stationed as a sort of safety several yards back. The Eagles, too, had practiced a similar formation in practice, calling it the Herman Edwards play. Other NFL teams soon followed the lead, and today the formation is standard in college and high school games as well.

=== Similar plays ===
A near-identical play in a 1999 collegiate game allowed the University of Nevada, Las Vegas (UNLV) to steal a victory from Baylor University. With the final seconds ticking off the clock, Baylor had a 24–21 lead and possession of the football near the UNLV goal line. With UNLV out of timeouts, only a kneel down was necessary. However, Baylor instead elected to try for a touchdown. Baylor running back Darryl Bush fumbled while trying to punch his way into the end zone and UNLV's Kevin Thomas picked up the loose football and went 99 yards for the game-winning touchdown on the last play of the game.

"The Miracle on the Mountain" is another play with similar circumstances. It took place on October 12, 2002, in a game between the home Appalachian State Mountaineers and visiting Furman Paladins at Kidd Brewer Stadium. The Paladins took a 15–14 lead on a touchdown with seven seconds remaining in the game, then attempted a two-point conversion to extend their lead to three. On the conversion attempt, Furman quarterback Billy Napier's pass was intercepted by Josh Jeffries at the four-yard line. Jeffries lateraled the ball to Derrick Black, who returned it for a defensive conversion, giving the Mountaineers a 16–15 win.

Another similar ending involved a player's, rather than a coach's, questionable decision that cost his team a game. On Thanksgiving Day 1993, the Cowboys were playing against the visiting Dolphins in sleet. As the clock ticked down, Dallas appeared to have won when it blocked a 41-yard Miami field goal. But as several Dolphins players were gathered around the ball, waiting for it to come to rest in order to down it as close as possible to the Dallas goal, Dallas defensive end Leon Lett sprinted downfield to try to recover it. He slipped on the slick surface and touched the ball. His touch meant that it became a live ball and Miami was able to recover at the Dallas 1 and kick a field goal for a 16–14 victory. The misplaced play came on the heels of the previous year's Super Bowl, when a prematurely celebrating Lett had been stripped on a fourth-quarter fumble return as he was about to score a touchdown. However, whereas the Super Bowl miscue was inconsequential insofar as the Cowboys had already had the title well in hand by that point, the game-losing gaffe cemented Lett's reputation for unthinking play that overshadowed his entire career.

A similar play occurred during a Monday Night Football game between the Chargers and Kansas City Chiefs on October 31, 2011. Tied 20–20 with one minute left, the Chargers had the ball on the Chiefs' 15-yard line. The Chiefs had no timeouts so the Chargers could run the clock down to the final seconds to set up the winning field goal. On the ensuing snap, the football jammed into Chargers quarterback Philip Rivers' ring finger, dislocating it, causing Rivers to fumble the ball. Chiefs linebacker Andy Studebaker recovered the fumble and the Chiefs went on to win in overtime 23–20. Rivers was seen on the sidelines mouthing the words, "This is the worst day ever." As a result of the win, the Chiefs moved into a three-way tie for the lead in the AFC West.

Another occurrence capped Kansas State's 38–35 comeback victory on November 21, 2015, over Iowa State. Kansas State had rallied from a 35–14 halftime deficit to pull to within a touchdown. With 1:31 left, Iowa State having possession and the Wildcats with just one time out remaining, the Cyclones fumbled the ball away on first down and Kansas State tied the game on the ensuing possession. On Iowa State's next series, the Cyclones again chose to run a play rather than take a knee (and send the game into overtime), but quarterback Joel Lanning was sacked on second down and fumbled the ball, which was recovered by the Wildcats and led to the game-winning field goal. Iowa State coach Paul Rhoads' play-calling in the final ninety seconds of the game, in addition to a difficult 2015 season for the team, ultimately led to his firing.

Another occurrence happened during the October 7, 2023 college football game between Georgia Tech and Miami. With thirty-four seconds remaining and Georgia Tech having exhausted all of their three timeouts, Miami led 20–17 when the Hurricanes called for a running play on third down instead of taking a knee. Running back Don Chaney Jr. fumbled the ball at the end of the play, and Tech recovered at their own 25-yard line. A few plays later, quarterback Haynes King threw a 44-yard touchdown pass to wide receiver Christian Leary with two seconds left, and the Yellow Jackets stunned the Hurricanes 23–20. Miami coach Mario Cristobal later expressed that he should've chosen to kneel, though in the previous four games the Hurricanes played where their win had been long assured and they held the ball at the end of the game, Cristobal had ordered run plays to end each game rather than a kneel.

== Other uses ==
On November 20, 1988, the Giants hosted the Eagles with both teams in the running for control over their division. The Eagles, led by head coach Buddy Ryan and quarterback Randall Cunningham, fought a tough match to bring the game into overtime with the score tied at 17–17. In overtime, Eagles defensive lineman Clyde Simmons carried the ball 15 yards after a blocked Eagles field goal attempt for the game-winning touchdown, completing a season sweep of the Giants. This was dubbed the "Forgotten Miracle at the Meadowlands" or the "Miracle at the Meadowlands 2".

On September 23, 1991, in a Monday Night Football game between the New York Jets and the Chicago Bears, the Jets were leading 13–6 and had the ball with two minutes remaining. With thousands of fans already having given up and headed to the Soldier Field parking lot, running back Blair Thomas took a handoff. Bears defensive tackle Steve McMichael stopped Thomas cold and then proceeded to wrestle the ball from his grasp, falling on the fumble at the Jets' 36-yard line with 1:54 remaining. On the final play of regulation, Jim Harbaugh threw a six-yard touchdown pass to Neal Anderson; Bears kicker Kevin Butler tied the game with the extra point. In overtime, Harbaugh scored from the one-yard line to clinch the win for Chicago.

On October 23, 2000, the New York Jets overcame a 30–7 fourth-quarter deficit in a Monday Night Football (MNF) contest against the Miami Dolphins to win 40–37 in overtime. It was the greatest comeback in MNF history, and was later voted the best Monday Night Football game ever by the show's fans. Jets fans have referred to this game, too, as "The Miracle at the Meadowlands", though the accepted name for the play throughout the NFL is the Monday Night Miracle.

A punt return by Brian Westbrook of the Eagles with 1:16 left on the clock on October 19, 2003, is occasionally referenced as a "Miracle at the Meadowlands". The play and subsequent extra point gave the Eagles a 14–10 victory over the Giants at Giants Stadium.

On December 14, 2008, the New York Jets were trailing the Buffalo Bills 27–24 with 1:45 left. The Jets had struggled to stop the Bills running game the entire day and the Bills were currently in possession of the ball on their own 20-yard line when Bills quarterback J. P. Losman ran a play action option. Jets safety Abram Elam sacked Losman and caused a fumble, which Jets defensive end Shaun Ellis picked up and ran for a touchdown to give the Jets a 31–27 victory (on the next Bills possession, Losman was picked off by cornerback Darrelle Revis). The New York Post ran an article the next day referring to the game as the Miracle at the Meadowlands sequel.

The "Miracle at the New Meadowlands" was played on December 19, 2010 at Met Life Stadium, which opened three months earlier as Giants Stadium's replacement. The Giants were leading the Eagles by a score of 31–10 with 7:28 left in the 4th quarter. The Eagles mounted a comeback by scoring 28 points culminating in a game-winning touchdown as time expired to win 38–31. Giants punter Matt Dodge kicked to DeSean Jackson on the final play, which resulted in a 65-yard punt return touchdown as time expired.

== See also ==
- Eagles–Giants rivalry
- The Holy Roller, another last-second play involving a fumble in a 1978 NFL game.
- History of the New York Giants (1925–78)
- List of nicknamed NFL games and plays
