= Bob Gibson (American football) =

American football player and coach (1927–2015)

Biographical details
- Born: April 6, 1927; Youngstown, Ohio, U.S.
- Died: April 10, 2015 (aged 88); Fort Myers, Florida, U.S.

Playing career
- 1946–1949: Youngstown State
- Position: Quarterback

Coaching career (HC unless noted)
- 195?–1955: East Liverpool HS (OH)
- 1956–1964: Bowling Green (OL)
- 1965–1967: Bowling Green
- 1974: Memphis Southmen (off. backs)
- 1975: Charlotte Hornets
- 1976: Detroit Lions (off. backs)
- 1977–1978: New York Giants (OC)

Head coaching record
- Overall: 19–9 (college)

Accomplishments and honors

Championships
- 1 MAC (1965)

Robert M. Gibson (April 6, 1927 – April 10, 2015) was an American football player and coach. He served as the head football coach at Bowling Green University 1965 to 1967. Gibson played college football as a quarterback at Youngstown State University, from which he graduated in 1950. Coaching for the New York Giants of the National Football League (NFL) as offensive coordinator in 1978, Gibson most famously called the play that resulted in the "Miracle at the Meadowlands".

== The Miracle at the Meadowlands ==
Playing their archrival Philadelphia Eagles, the Giants were leading 17–12 and had possession of the ball with only 30 seconds left. They had only to kneel the ball to end the game, as the Eagles had no timeouts. Gibson ordered Giants quarterback Joe Pisarcik to run play "Brown right, near wing, 65 slant", which called for Pisarcik to hand the ball off to fullback Larry Csonka. The handoff was botched and Eagles cornerback Herman Edwards picked up the loose ball and ran in for the game-winning score.

Gibson's reasoning was governed by what happened a play earlier. Pisarcik had taken a knee, only to be knocked over when the Eagles' Bill Bergey charged into Giants' center Jim Clack. This violated an unwritten rule that defensive players do not rush in a situation when the quarterback kneels down. Gibson did not want to risk getting Pisarcik injured or expose his players to penalties or fines for fighting. However, he did not explain this to the players, and it came across as a power trip. Head coach John McVay's headphones were not working, and he later said that he would have overruled Gibson had he known what was happening.

With angry Giants fans demanding someone be held responsible for the debacle, owner Wellington Mara and operations director Andy Robustelli met and decided Gibson had to go. He was fired the next morning. The stigma of having called the play was so great that he never worked in football at any level again. He refused to speak about the incident up until his death in 2015; when ESPN reached him by phone in 2008, he said, "I haven't talked about the game for 30 years, and I'm not about to start now."

== Later life ==
Gibson left New York and opened a bait shop and general store on Florida's Sanibel Island, where he also raised cattle on his ranch. Gibson still stayed in contact with McVay and another member of the 1978 staff, Lindy Infante, but otherwise largely moved on from his time in the NFL. Gibson died at age 88 on April 10, 2015.

== Head coaching record ==
=== College ===
Year	Team	Overall	Conference	Standing	Bowl/playoffs
Bowling Green Falcons (Mid-American Conference) (1965–1967)
1965	Bowling Green	7–2	5–1	T–1st	
1966	Bowling Green	6–3	4–2	3rd	
1967	Bowling Green	6–4	2–4	T–5th	
Bowling Green:		19–9	11–7		
Total:		19–9			
National championship Conference title Conference division title or championship game berth

== See also ==
- History of the New York Giants (1925–1978)
