= Joe Pisarcik =

American gridiron football player (born 1952)

No. 7, 9
- Position: Quarterback

Personal information
- Born: July 2, 1952 (age 74); Kingston, Pennsylvania, U.S.
- Listed height: 6 ft 4 in (1.93 m)
- Listed weight: 220 lb (100 kg)

Career information
- College: New Mexico State
- NFL draft: 1974: undrafted

Career history
- Calgary Stampeders (1974–1976); New York Giants (1977–1979); Philadelphia Eagles (1980–1984)

Career NFL statistics
- Passing attempts: 898
- Passing completions: 425
- Completion percentage: 47.3%
- TD–INT: 24–48
- Passing yards: 5,552
- Passer rating: 53.9
- Stats at Pro Football Reference

Joseph Anthony Pisarcik (born July 2, 1952) is an American former professional football player who was a quarterback for eight seasons in the National Football League (NFL) from 1977 through 1984. He played college football for the New Mexico State Aggies and began his pro career in the Canadian Football League (CFL).

After playing high school football at West Side Central Catholic H. S. (later Bishop O'Reilly, now closed), Pisarcik attended New Mexico State University. His first professional team was the Calgary Stampeders of the CFL, where he played from 1974 to 1976.

He began his NFL career with the New York Giants and is best remembered for his role in the November 19, 1978, game where the Giants, ahead 17–12 with only seconds to play and their opponent out of time-outs, lost after his handoff (a play called by offensive coordinator Bob Gibson over Pisarcik's objections) to Larry Csonka was fumbled and returned for a touchdown by Herman Edwards of the Philadelphia Eagles. The play has since been referred to as "The Fumble" by Giants fans and "The Miracle at the Meadowlands" by Eagles fans, and it was instrumental in making the quarterback kneel (also known as "taking a knee") a routine play for running down the clock at the end of a game.

Pisarcik was traded to the Eagles in 1980 for a sixth round pick, primarily as the backup to quarterback Ron Jaworski. He stayed with the Eagles until retiring after the 1984 season.

A resident of Mount Laurel, New Jersey, Pisarcik has five children: Kristin, Lindsey, Jake, Joseph and Katie. Jake is an offensive lineman for the University of Oregon.

Pisarcik was the CEO of the NFL Alumni Association in Newark. He retired in April 2017. Pisarcik was later sued by three women who alleged sexual harassment.

== See also ==
- History of the New York Giants (1925-1978)
