= Oren Middlebrook =

American football player (born 1953)

No. 81
- Position: Wide receiver

Personal information
- Born: January 23, 1953 (age 73); Aberdeen, Mississippi, U.S.
- Listed height: 6 ft 2 in (1.88 m)
- Listed weight: 185 lb (84 kg)

Career information
- High school: Aberdeen
- College: Arkansas State
- NFL draft: 1977: 10th round, 268th overall pick

Career history
- Denver Broncos (1977)*; Philadelphia Eagles (1978)
- * Offseason or practice squad member only
- Stats at Pro Football Reference

Oren Middlebrook (born January 23, 1953) is an American former professional football player who was a wide receiver for the Philadelphia Eagles of the National Football League (NFL) in 1978. He played college football for the Arkansas State Red Wolves. Middlebrook played 16 games for the Eagles during the 1978 season before retiring.
