= Quarterback kneel =

American football and Canadian football play

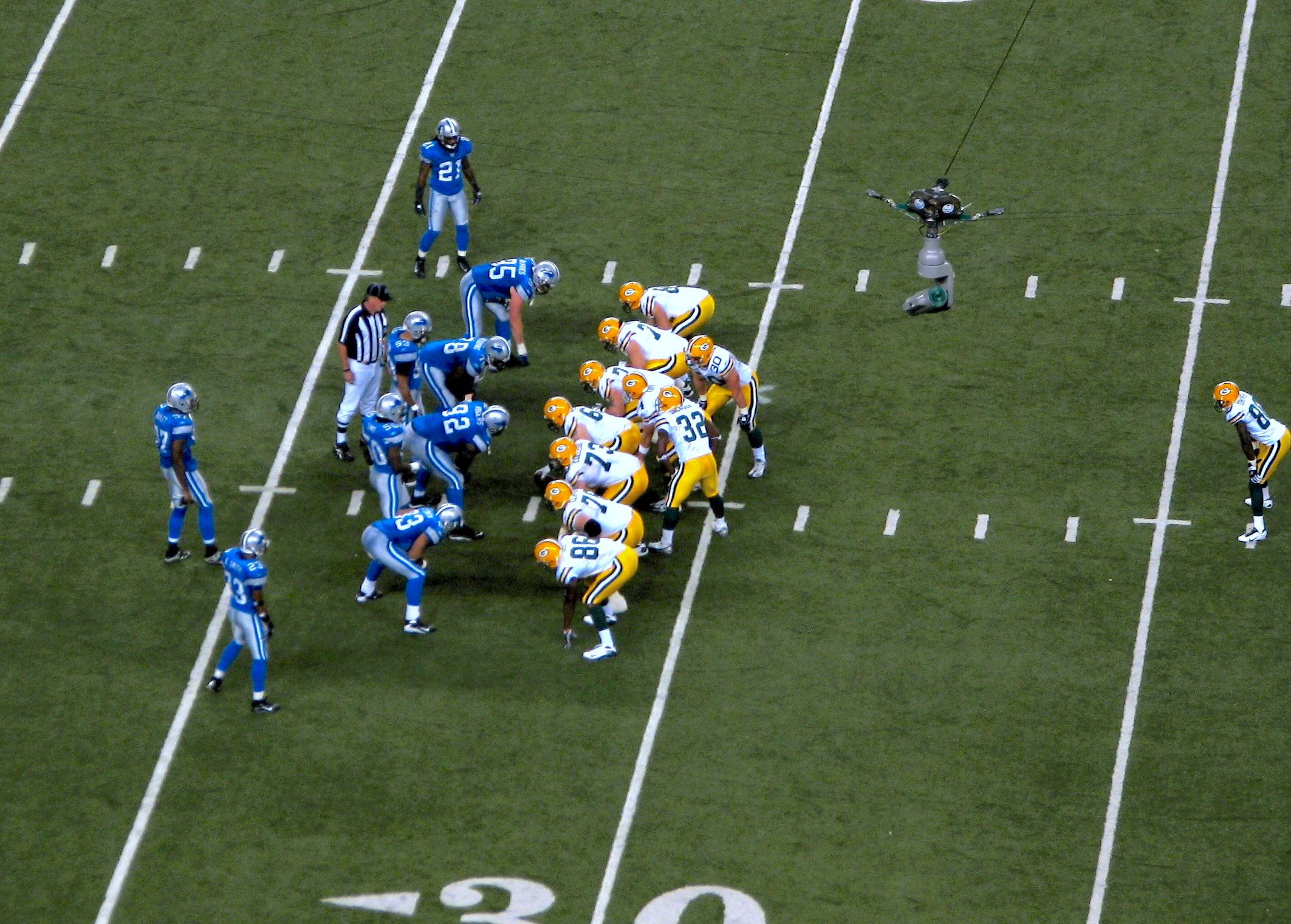
The Green Bay Packers in victory formation (on the right) in a game against the Detroit Lions in 2007

In American football and Canadian football, a quarterback kneel, also called taking a knee, genuflect offense, kneel-down offense, or victory formation, occurs when the quarterback touches a knee to the ground immediately after receiving the snap, thus downing himself and ending the play. It is primarily used to run the clock down, either at the end of the first half (regardless of which team is ahead) or the game itself, to preserve a lead or ensure a game goes into overtime if the game is tied and in the fourth quarter. Although it generally results in a loss of some yardage and uses up a down, it minimizes the risk of a fumble, which would give the other team a chance at recovering the ball.

The play is meant to keep the defense from seriously challenging for possession of the ball. The rules penalize rough play after the ball is dead, which in this play usually occurs a fraction of a second after the snap. Especially when the outcome of the game is all but certain, defenses will often give little resistance to the play as a matter of sportsmanship as well as to reduce the risk of injuries, penalties, and possible supplemental discipline (referees and leagues have in recent years given increasingly severe penalties for unnecessary roughness inflicted on quarterbacks, as well as headshots in general). The quarterback is generally not touched.

The formation offers maximum protection against a fumble; should the center-quarterback exchange result in a fumble, a running back is lined up on either side of the quarterback, both to recover any fumble and protect the vulnerable kneeling player from being injured by defensive players who get through the line. Also, a player known as the "safety valve" is lined up directly behind the quarterback, often much farther than a typical tailback would line up. This player's responsibility is to tackle any defensive player who may recover a fumble and attempt to advance it. Because of this essentially "defensive" responsibility, the tailback in this formation may actually be a free safety or other defensive player who is adept at making tackles in the open field.

Even though the play itself takes very little time, the rules of American football dictate that it does not stop the game clock (as with any play where the ball carrier is tackled in bounds). With the 40-second play clock in the NFL and NCAA, along with the two-minute warning in the NFL (and the NCAA since 2024 as the two-minute "timeout"), a team can run off over two minutes with three straight kneel-downs if the defensive team has no more timeouts. The winning team can storm the field if up to 40 seconds remains in the game (25 in XFL or 35 in UFL). In such situations, even before the game is technically over (i.e. the game clock will still be running), it is common for opposing coaches, team staff and players (including those not on the field for the final play) to shake hands with each other, and for media and other accredited persons to come onto the field as well to commence interviews. In the XFL, as many as three straight "victory formations" from 75 seconds (or in UFL, 1:45) left in regulation can be performed.

The offense must be aware of the current down, as well as the distance between the line of scrimmage and their own endzone. From first down, a kneel can occur three times, taking first, second, and third down, respectively. A kneel on fourth down, however, would result in a turnover on downs and give the defense the ball back, possibly setting them up for a game-winning drive depending on how much time is left. Thus, it is common to see a team aim to get a first down before they can start kneeling, as they may not have enough downs to kneel out the remaining time in the game. Each kneel also loses the offense about 1 or 2 yards, which is typically insignificant, but if the offense is very close to its own endzone, it risks a safety if they kneel down in their own endzone, as well as loss of the ball to the defense.

The kneeldown is often called a "victory formation", as it is most often run by a winning team late in the game in order to preserve a victory. In the case of a close game, the winning team would be trying to avoid a turnover which might be the result of a more complex play. In the case of a more lopsided contest where the winning team's overall point differential has no prospect of affecting their playoff qualification prospects, the play can be run as a matter of sportsmanship (the winning team forgoing the opportunity to run up the score) and to avoid injuries and/or penalties. In terms of statistics, a kneel by the quarterback is typically recorded as a rushing attempt for −1 or −2 yards.

Other sports also use the term "victory formation" for a play designed only to run down the clock with little chance of injury, such as a jammer in roller derby skating behind or only lightly challenging the pack while the final seconds of the bout tick down.

== Strategy ==
The quarterback kneel is mainly used when the team in the lead has possession of the ball with less than two minutes on the game clock. The two minute warning automatically stops the clock in an NFL game; thus, regardless of the circumstances, the team with possession after the two minute warning must run a play in order to re-start the clock. Therefore, with the 40-second play clock in the NFL and NCAA, two minutes (120 seconds) is in theory the maximum amount of time that can be run off on three consecutive quarterback kneels; this assumes it is first down and the defense has no timeouts remaining. A team cannot run more than three consecutive quarterback kneels, as doing so on fourth down turns the ball over to the opponent and guarantees them at least one opportunity to score. The decision to run the quarterback kneel depends on the amount of time remaining in the game, the down, and the number of timeouts the defense has remaining. For example, if there is one minute remaining on the game clock on first down, and the defense has one timeout left, the offense may use two successive quarterback kneels to completely run out the clock, and if the defense uses its timeout, the offense can simply execute a third kneel to run out the clock. However, if there is one minute remaining on the game clock on third down, then regardless of how many timeouts the defense has, quarterback kneels will not completely run out the clock and the offense should try to make a first down. The XFL allows this to happen if up to 75 seconds remain; that league utilizes a 25-second play clock.

Even if a series of quarterback kneels may not completely bleed the game clock, a team that is ahead with under two minutes remaining may still be advised to call the kneeldowns in such a situation if it minimizes their opponent's chances of coming back to tie or win the game. For example, on September 22, 2018, the Oregon Ducks led the Stanford Cardinal by three points and had possession of the football on second down and three at Stanford's 43-yard line with 58 seconds of game time remaining and one timeout left for Stanford. Mario Cristobal, the then-head coach of the Oregon Ducks, called a running play rather than a quarterback kneel, but Oregon fumbled the ball back to Stanford, who subsequently tied the game on the ensuing drive and won the game in overtime. Had Cristobal ordered a couple of kneeldowns, Stanford would have, in all likelihood, regained possession of the football on a punt with around ten seconds remaining and no timeouts left at their disposal. Because Stanford would have had an extremely small chance at tying or winning the game in the alternative scenario, Cristobal was heavily criticized after his team's loss for calling a play that exposed his team to the risk of a turnover rather than kneeling and minimizing the chances of a Stanford comeback. Ironically, five years later, on October 7, 2023, Cristobal was again heavily criticized for electing not to kneel. In this situation, Cristobal's Miami Hurricanes led the Georgia Tech Yellow Jackets by three points, and Miami had possession of the ball on third down with 34 seconds remaining in the game and Georgia Tech having used up all of their timeouts. Instead of calling a quarterback kneel to drain the rest of the clock and end the game, Cristobal called a running play, which resulted in a Miami fumble that was recovered by Georgia Tech. Georgia Tech subsequently used the remaining game time on the ensuing drive to score a game-winning touchdown. The criticism towards Cristobal was much more intense following the Georgia Tech-Miami game because kneeling would have ensured a victory for Cristobal's Hurricanes, whereas kneeling would not have guaranteed a victory for Cristobal's Ducks in the Stanford-Oregon game.

The quarterback kneel is also often used at the end of the first half by a team which feels they have little chance of scoring before halftime due to poor field position, and wish to minimize the chances for a disastrous turnover. It is also sometimes run at the end of the second half of a tie game by a team content with sending the game into overtime. Less commonly, the play is sometimes run at the end of the game by a losing team which is hopelessly behind and wishes to hasten the end of the game without threatening player health on needless garbage time drives. Rarely, in blowout situations in high school or small college sports, the decision to kneel is made mutually by both coaches if a deficit is too large to realistically overcome.

A team that is in field-goal range and either tied or trailing by three or fewer points can also use one or more kneeldowns in order to run time off the clock before attempting a game-winning or -tying field goal. A quarterback in this situation may also run several yards to his left or right before kneeling down in order to center the spot for a field goal attempt or realign the ball closer to a particular set of hash marks if the team's kicker has a preference for where they kick. Ideally, the clock should run out during the field goal attempt, disallowing the next kickoff and an attempt for the next team to score. Atlanta Falcons head coach Arthur Smith has been known to call quarterback kneels in these situations so as to set up kicker Younghoe Koo for game-winning field goal attempts and prevent Atlanta's opponents from having the chance to answer back offensively. The strategy has been successful for Smith's Falcons on four different occasions (victories against Miami and New Orleans in 2021, Arizona in 2022, and Houston in 2023).

A quarterback kneel used to be purposefully initiated on a point after touchdown try at the end of the game after a game-winning or defensive touchdown was scored at the end of regulation; NFL rules required the try to be executed between the offense and defense, even if the offense intends to decline the unnecessary points to avoid further insulting or annoying their opponent. This occurred prominently in the "Minneapolis Miracle" during the 2017 playoffs, in which eight New Orleans Saints players on offense and defense had to return to the field from the locker room to 'oppose' the try against the victorious Minnesota Vikings after referees insisted they complete the try. Quarterback Case Keenum merely knelt down with the ball before tossing it in the air and celebrating the Vikings victory, with the Saints making no effort to oppose. The rule was changed for the 2018 season to omit the try if it would have no impact on the outcome of the game. If the try has to be attempted because the defense has the opportunity to run it back for 2 points to win or tie the game, the quarterback will usually kneel to prevent the defense from doing so.

In rare instances, a team will use the quarterback kneel to avoid running up the score in a lopsided contest, even though there may be significant time remaining on the clock. This occurred in the 2011 edition of the Magnolia Bowl between the LSU Tigers and Ole Miss Rebels. With five minutes remaining and LSU leading 52–3, Tigers head coach Les Miles ordered third-string quarterback Zach Mettenberger to kneel on first and goal from the Ole Miss one-yard line, and to kneel on the next three plays. Miles felt another touchdown would further embarrass Ole Miss coach Houston Nutt, who announced his resignation, effective at the end of the season, 12 days before the Rebels hosted first-ranked LSU. The Tigers had already secured the largest margin of victory in series history. Similarly, in Week 3 of the 2023 NFL season, the Miami Dolphins scored 70 points against the Denver Broncos, which was just the fourth time a team had scored that many points in NFL history. Deep into the fourth quarter, the Dolphins, having already scored 70 points, drove into field goal range and thus had a chance to break the regular season record for most points scored by a team in a single game. However, Miami head coach Mike McDaniel passed up the opportunity and called a quarterback kneel on fourth down so that his team would not further embarrass their opponent.

On rare occasions, quarterbacks will kneel to ensure a tie when the overtime period (or fourth quarter in competitions which do not use overtime) is about to expire, especially if the tie might still be of some benefit to the team's playoff fortunes compared to a loss. Notably, if a team has possession of the ball deep in its own territory in such a situation, it may be as likely or more likely to turn over the ball in its own territory (which would give the opponent a good chance to score and thus win the game) than they are to advance the ball far enough to obtain a good scoring chance themselves.

In Canadian football, which has slightly different rules, the circumstances in which kneeling is a viable strategy are more limited. Unlike in American football, in Canadian football every quarter must end with a play, even in situations where the game clock expires after the end of the previous play. Also, the play clock in the CFL is only twenty seconds long. Therefore, since the offence only has three downs, the maximum amount of time an offence can consume by kneeling without attempting to earn another first down (i.e. after the offence earns a first down while keeping the ball in bounds and the defense has no time outs) is a little over one minute. On the other hand, in Canadian football teams have only one time out per half, compared to three in American football.

In Canadian football, a quarterback kneel is by far the most common play for winning teams to run with "zeros on the clock" at the end of a game, barring exceptional (but not unheard-of) situations where the head-to-head point differential in the opposing team's season series (a key factor in tiebreakers) remains in doubt (under the current CFL playoff format and tiebreakers, this is only relevant for teams in the same division). Moreover, in that situation such a play can be run on any down - even if it is third down when time expires between plays, a kneel will not result in a turnover on downs since the game will be over. Thus, even though there is one less down in Canadian football, there are still occasional circumstances in which a winning team will kneel on three consecutive plays (the same maximum number as is feasible in American football) in order to end the game.

A "fake kneel" is very rare, and would likely be considered unsportsmanlike in most situations in which a kneel is to be expected. However there are situations where kneeling may be useful but it is still advantageous to score points. This might take place near the end of the first half running the clock down before faking the kneel in an attempt to surprise the defense, or in a tied game at the end of regulation. An example of this was in Super Bowl LI, with the game tied 28-28, on the final play of regulation, the New England Patriots ran a fake kneel in which Tom Brady faked a run and pitch to his right, with Dion Lewis waiting a second before taking the ball and running to his left. While initially surprised, the Atlanta Falcons defense shut down the play with a nominal gain of 12 yards. Coach Bill Belichick opted for the trick play because the team was too far away for a field goal, and the 75 yards distance for a Hail Mary was likely too far for Brady to reach the end zone.

== History ==
Until 1970 (1965 in the AFL), keeping track of the official time in an NFL game was known solely by the on-field officials (who often communicated time left to the players and the coaches). The stadium game time, if displayed at all, was unofficial and often done so with poor-quality analog scoreboard clocks utilizing clock-like dials that did not meet a universal league standard, requiring more effort to ascertain the exact time left. Moreover, many of the stadiums used at the time primarily hosted baseball, thus the scoreboards were optimized for a sport which at the time did not even use a game clock (being decades before the advent of the pitch clock, at which point most multi-purpose stadiums had long been demolished), and were often in incongruent positions not easily visible to the players, with timing also done by portable devices rented by the teams that were not synchronized to the main board.

Thus, it was not feasible for teams to engage in the sort of meticulous clock management that would eventually become commonplace in the modern era, since coaches and players had only a rough estimate of how much time remained after each play. The risk of miscalculating the amount of time remaining in a half or game was a strong deterrent against willfully foregoing the opportunity to advance the ball on each down. A play clock visible to all in the stadium was not instituted in the NFL until 1976, meaning the timing of a kneel could not be ascertained.

Traditionally, teams leading after the two-minute warning generally ran quarterback sneaks (which brought the risk of injuries on low-yardage plays) or dive plays to the fullbacks or other running backs to run time off the clock. Even after the stadium game clock became official, this tradition endured for a time as many coaches in this era considered kneeling cowardly or even unsportsmanlike. However, the Miracle at the Meadowlands, on November 19, 1978, in which defensive back Herman Edwards of the visiting Philadelphia Eagles recovered a botched handoff between quarterback Joe Pisarcik and running back Larry Csonka of the New York Giants, provided a nationally televised spur for change. It was one of the very rare instances in major sports in which a significant and nearly universal change in strategic tactics across an entire sport can be attributed to a response to a single play in a specific game.

With 31 seconds remaining, the Giants led 17–12 and the Eagles were out of timeouts. As Pisarcik attempted to hand the ball to Larry Csonka, it was awkwardly fumbled; Edwards scooped it up and ran it 26 yards for the Eagles' improbable 19–17 victory. The play generated tremendous controversy, ridicule, and criticism toward the Giants nationwide and specifically offensive coordinator Bob Gibson for failing to use the supposedly foolproof quarterback-kneel-down play. Gibson was promptly fired following the game and never worked in football again.

In the week following the game, both the Eagles and Giants developed specific formations designed to protect the quarterback behind three players as he fell on the ball. Previously, quarterbacks executing a similar "kill the clock" play simply ran a quarterback sneak from a tightly packed conventional offensive formation. The Eagles made the playoffs and the Giants finished at 6–10.

The "victory formation" spread rapidly throughout football at nearly all levels, as coaches sought to adopt a procedure for downing the ball in the final seconds which would reduce the risk of turnovers to the absolute minimum possible. Within a season or so, it had become nearly universal. In 1987 the NFL rule allowing quarterbacks to simply kneel without risking a hit from the defense took effect.

One of the revived XFL's most significant officiating controversies in 2020 occurred as a direct consequence of a mistimed quarterback kneel. While leading 32–23 over the Seattle Dragons, Houston Roughnecks quarterback P. J. Walker knelt on fourth down at his own 21-yard line with three seconds remaining on the clock. Officials mistakenly declared the game over, thus depriving the Dragons the chance to run at least one offensive play in which (due to the XFL's three-point conversion rule) they should have had a chance to tie the game and force overtime. The league quickly admitted the mistake and largely avoided further scrutiny after, along with nearly all other professional sports leagues, it cancelled the remainder of its season due to the COVID-19 pandemic.

During their last game of the 2023 NFL season, the New Orleans Saints lined up in victory formation at the Atlanta Falcons' 1-yard line. Rather than kneeling, quarterback Jameis Winston handed off the ball to running back Jamaal Williams for a touchdown. The subterfuge elicited an angry response from Falcons coach Arthur Smith, who was fired the next day, and a post-game apology from Saints coach Dennis Allen; the run play was called by the players without his approval.

== Defense ==
Although in most instances a losing team will concede defeat when the other team is in the victory formation and taking the quarterback kneel, there are instances where the trailing team will try to make a defensive play in an attempt to regain possession of the ball, particularly when the losing team is behind by a touchdown or less and there is enough time to make more than one play.

Formation adopted for the quarterback kneel play after the Miracle at the Meadowlands

This had happened on the play preceding the Miracle at the Meadowlands. Due to the extreme difficulty and unlikelihood of causing a legal turnover when compared to the risks of injury, penalty and supplemental discipline, defenses generally do not attempt to disrupt the kneeldown as the Eagles did in 1978. By the 1980s, a "gentlemen's agreement" emerged in which defenders did not rush the offensive team with high intensity, as long as the offense made no attempt to advance the ball.

One prominent exception occurred to another Giants quarterback in 2012. In Week 2, an interception of a Tampa Bay Buccaneers pass with six seconds left had apparently secured a 25-point fourth-quarter comeback and 41–34 Giants victory. However, in the ensuing "victory formation" play, instead of the usual nominal contact between the linemen, the Buccaneers stacked the line of scrimmage and forced the Giants' line back in an attempt to cause Giants' QB Eli Manning to fumble. Manning was knocked back by his own center as he took the snap and fell down. Giants coach Tom Coughlin angrily confronted his Tampa Bay counterpart, Greg Schiano, at midfield once the game was over. Undaunted, Schiano employed a similar strategy the next week at the end of the Buccaneers' game against the Dallas Cowboys. In the next season, with the Philadelphia Eagles leading the Buccaneers, Chip Kelly had quarterback Nick Foles attempt a shotgun formation kneeldown to avert Schiano's aggressive technique, which succeeded. On occasion, especially in major games, the defense has made it clear they will not concede and have attempted to aggressively rush the kneel down. The San Francisco 49ers tried to rush the kneel on each down of the final possession of Super Bowl LIV, forcing Patrick Mahomes to instead run back on his first three kneel-downs and to reel back on fourth down and throw a long pass to expire the last five seconds of the game and seal the victory for the Kansas City Chiefs. These "kneels" had a combined loss of 15 yards and dropped Mahomes's game yards from 44 to 29, which affected the margins for Vegas bettors (in college football, quarterback kneel-downs are charged as "Team" rushing yards, not to the quarterback).

If a team would be in position to take a kneeldown except that they are backed up so close to their own end zone that doing so would result in a safety, they may attempt a more conventional running play, and defenses are more likely to contest these plays. In Super Bowl XLIX, following Malcolm Butler's interception near the goal line, the Seattle Seahawks attempted to rush the New England Patriots offensive line on two occasions, in the first instance causing an offside penalty and in the second, an on-field altercation between the two sets of players, leading to the first (and as of 2026 only) Super Bowl ejection, of Seahawks player Bruce Irvin. On the third kneeldown attempt, with no risk of a safety, no rushing attempt was made. In a 2022 game between the Buffalo Bills and Minnesota Vikings, the Bills gained possession late in the game on a turnover on downs inches short of the goal line. Quarterback Josh Allen then attempted to lunge forward out of the end zone, but fumbled the ball, which was recovered by the Vikings for a touchdown.

Aside from trying to attempt a defensive play, teams that are losing but behind by a touchdown or less in the final two minutes will sometimes use their time-outs if the team does a quarterback kneel. As teams are allowed three time-outs per half—the clock stops on a time out and restarts on the snap—they will try to preserve them for situations such as this, thereby forcing the winning team to run a play and gain a first down or, at the very least, take time off the clock.

If there is still enough time left on the clock and the winning team attempts another quarterback kneel, the defensive team's strategy may repeat itself until it either runs out of time-outs, time runs out, or (most desirably) the team forces a punt or turnover, but the fourth down play is still subject to other maneuvers to run out the clock. In 2016, the Baltimore Ravens, leading in a game against the Cincinnati Bengals after three plays in their final drive, ran off the remaining twelve seconds of clock in a punt formation with Sam Koch purposefully holding the ball in the end zone while multiple holding calls were made against the Ravens offense pushing back against (and in some cases, shoving down) Bengal players. The play ended with Koch touching his toe to the back end zone line after time expired and taking an intentional safety (offensive fouls at the end of the game do not result in a replay of a down, unlike their defensive equivalents). The intentional holding aspect of the play was made illegal after the 2016 NFL season.

A team can also lose a game in a kneel-down situation due to mismanagement or miscalculating the time. For example, in a game against the UCF Golden Knights on December 4, 2014, East Carolina University coach Ruffin McNeill ordered his team to take a knee with 1:47 left on the clock and a 30-26 lead. UCF used its final timeout, preventing ECU from running out the clock, but McNeill chose to kneel on fourth down rather than attempt a 37-yard field goal. The play left 10 seconds on the clock and turned the ball over to UCF, who then completed a 14 yard pass and a 51 yard pass to score the winning touchdown.

== Rules ==
The 2011 NFL Rules state in Rule 7, Section 2, Article 1(c): "An official shall declare the ball dead and the down ended ... when a quarterback immediately drops to his knee (or simulates dropping to his knee) behind the line of scrimmage".

The 2011 and 2012 NCAA Rules state in Rule 4, Section 1, Article 3(o): "A live ball becomes dead and an official shall sound his whistle or declare it dead ... When a ball carrier simulates placing his knee on the ground." The same rule is used by the British American Football Association.

The 2011 CFL Rules state in Rule 1, Section 4: "The ball is dead ... When the quarterback, in possession of the ball, intentionally kneels on the ground during the last three minutes of a half". The Statistical Scoring Rules, Section 5(e) states: "When a quarterback voluntarily drops to one knee and concedes yards in an effort to run out the clock, the yards lost will be charged under Team Losses. NOTE – No quarterback sack will be given in this situation."
