= Herm Edwards =

American football player and coach (born 1954)

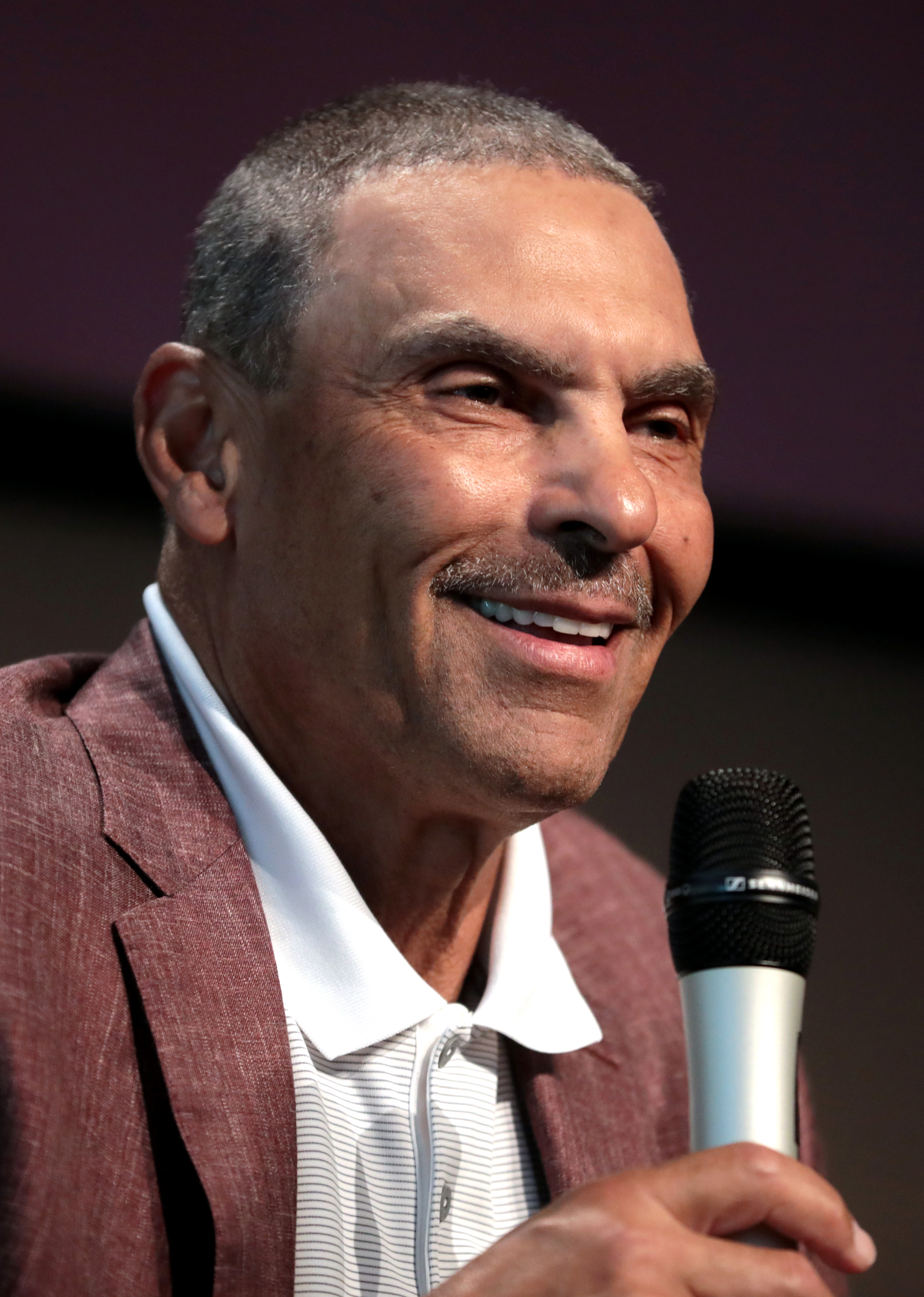
- Edwards in 2022

No. 46
- Position: Cornerback

Personal information
- Born: April 27, 1954 (age 72); Fort Monmouth, New Jersey, U.S.
- Listed height: 6 ft 0 in (1.83 m)
- Listed weight: 194 lb (88 kg)

Career information
- High school: Monterey (Monterey, California)
- College: California (1972, 1974) Monterey Peninsula College (1973) San Diego State (1975)
- NFL draft: 1976: undrafted

Career history

Playing
- Philadelphia Eagles (1977–1985); Atlanta Falcons (1986); Los Angeles Rams (1986)

Coaching
- San Jose State (1987–1989) Defensive backs coach; Kansas City Chiefs (1992–1995) Defensive backs coach; Tampa Bay Buccaneers (1996–2000) Assistant head coach & defensive backs coach; New York Jets (2001–2005) Head coach; Kansas City Chiefs (2006–2008) Head coach; Arizona State (2018–2022) Head coach

Operations
- Kansas City Chiefs (1990–1991) Scout

Awards and highlights
- Second-team All-Pac-8 (1974)

Career NFL statistics
- Interceptions: 33
- Forced fumbles: 2
- Fumble recoveries: 6
- Defensive touchdowns: 2
- Stats at Pro Football Reference

Head coaching record
- Regular season: NFL: 54–74 (.422)
- Postseason: NFL: 2–4 (.333)
- Career: NFL: 56–78 (.418); NCAA: 18–20 (.474) (Note: All wins during the 2021 season were vacated due to NCAA violations regarding recruiting.)
- Coaching profile at Pro Football Reference

Herman Montmartre Edwards (born April 27, 1954) is an American football coach and former player. He played cornerback in the National Football League (NFL) for ten seasons, primarily with the Philadelphia Eagles. Edwards was also a head coach in the NFL from 2001 to 2008 with the New York Jets and Kansas City Chiefs. Following the conclusion of his NFL coaching career, Edwards was a football analyst at ESPN from 2009 to 2017. He later served as the head coach of the Arizona State Sun Devils from 2018 to 2022.

As a player, Edwards is known for scoring the game-winning touchdown off a fumble recovery in 1978's Miracle at the Meadowlands. During his NFL coaching tenure, he reached the playoffs four times, three times with the Jets and once with the Chiefs. His most successful season was in 2002 when he led the Jets to a division title, which is the franchise's most recent. Edwards became popular as a coach and broadcaster for short, punchy declarations dubbed "Hermisms" by fans. The message "You play to win the game!", which he delivered during a Jets press conference, would become the title of his self-help book.

== Early life ==
Edwards was born on an Army base in Eatontown, New Jersey, the son of an American World War II veteran and his German wife. He graduated from Monterey High School in Monterey, California. Edwards played college football at the University of California, Berkeley in 1972 and 1974, at junior college Monterey Peninsula College in 1973, and at San Diego State University (SDSU) in his senior year, 1975. He graduated from SDSU with a degree in criminal justice. He helped promote Monterey County Special Olympics for several years. His public involvement helped educate Monterey County residents about the importance of athletics with the developmentally disabled.

== Playing career ==
In the National Football League (NFL), Edwards played nine seasons with the Philadelphia Eagles from 1977 to 1985, making a championship appearance with the team in Super Bowl XV. His 33 career interceptions are just one short of the franchise record. He never missed a game in his nine seasons with the Eagles, remaining active with the team for 135 consecutive regular season games until being cut by incoming head coach Buddy Ryan in 1986. Edwards went on to play briefly for the Los Angeles Rams and Atlanta Falcons in 1986 before announcing his retirement.

The highlight of Edwards' playing career occurred in the twelfth game of the 1978 season, in the final seconds of a game against the New York Giants at the Meadowlands on November 19. The Giants led 17–12 and the Eagles had no time-outs remaining, but instead of simply taking the snap from center and kneeling, Giants quarterback Joe Pisarcik attempted to hand the ball off to running back Larry Csonka. However, the ball came loose and Edwards picked it up and returned it for a touchdown, enabling the Eagles to win 19–17. This play became known in Philadelphia as "The Miracle at the Meadowlands" and in New York City as simply "The Fumble." The Eagles made the playoffs and the Giants finished at 6–10.

Philadelphia's implementation of the victory formation, which was designed as a result of “The Miracle at the Meadowlands”, was known as the "Herman Edwards play."

== Coaching career ==
=== Early years ===
After his playing career ended, Edwards became a defensive assistant at San Jose State (1987–1989), then was an NFL scout and defensive backs coach with the Kansas City Chiefs (1990–1995), for former Browns, Chiefs, Redskins, and Chargers coach Marty Schottenheimer. With the Tampa Bay Buccaneers (1996–2000), he was a defensive backs/assistant head coach under Tony Dungy. On January 28, 2001, Edwards was hired as head coach of the New York Jets.

=== New York Jets ===
In his five years as the Jets head coach, Edwards compiled a 39–41 regular season record, including a 5–15 stretch during his final twenty regular season games with the club, and a 2–3 record in the playoffs. Edwards decided to run a 4–3 "Cover 2" defense. Although many fans and players questioned Edwards' decisions, the Jets had mild success in Edwards' first two seasons, reaching the playoffs in both. The Jets were the sixth seed in 2001, losing on the road in the first round to the Oakland Raiders 38–24. In 2002, the Jets squeaked into the playoffs with a 9–7 record, due to winning the tie-breakers in a three-way tie for the AFC East Division lead with the New England Patriots and the Miami Dolphins. The Jets advanced through the Wildcard round this time, which led to a return trip to Oakland. Once again, Edwards and the Jets came up short, losing 30–10 to the Raiders. Following a disappointing 6–10 season in 2003, the Jets reached the divisional round of the AFC playoffs once more in 2004, where they lost to the Pittsburgh Steelers 20–17. In 2005, a year marred by injuries, inconsistent play, lack of player development, and rumors swirling about Edwards possibly leaving the organization, Edwards led the Jets to a woeful 4–12 record. Following the end of the season, the Jets made the highly unusual move of trading a coach—Edwards—to another team (the Kansas City Chiefs), in exchange for a player to be chosen in round four of the 2006 draft. Overall, Edwards' tenure as head coach of the Jets was marred by chronic clock management problems, an ultra-conservative "play not to lose" mentality, and a lack of any discernible defensive philosophy, despite Edwards' supposed expertise in the Cover 2 defense. The Jets replaced Edwards by hiring Eric Mangini, a senior assistant coach with the New England Patriots.

==== Departure from New York ====
Following the 2005 season, Chiefs president Carl Peterson hinted to the press about interest in hiring Edwards that could have been considered tampering. The Jets granted permission to the Chiefs to speak with Edwards. At the time, Edwards had two years remaining on his contract with the Jets. However, Peterson wanted Edwards (a longtime personal acquaintance) to succeed head coach Dick Vermeil, who was Edwards' coach on the Eagles and had just retired.

As the rumors started swirling, a war of words between the two teams began to start up in the media. In the midst of all the speculation, Edwards tried to use what leverage he thought he had with the Jets to get a contract extension and hefty pay raise from the Jets, which only served to further anger Jets owner Woody Johnson. Eventually, the two teams worked out a deal, and the Chiefs sent the Jets a fourth-round pick in the 2006 NFL draft as compensation (the Jets later used this selection to take Leon Washington).

=== Kansas City Chiefs ===
Edwards' regular season coaching debut with the Chiefs was a 23–10 home loss to the Cincinnati Bengals on September 10. His first win with Kansas City came in the third game of the season on October 1, a 41–0 shutout of the San Francisco 49ers.

The 2006 season would see many highs and lows. Starting quarterback Trent Green suffered a serious concussion in the first game of the season. Despite Green's injury, the Chiefs continued to stay in contention, largely thanks to backup quarterback Damon Huard and Pro Bowl running back Larry Johnson. In a move some considered controversial, Edwards chose to sit Huard and start Green when he returned from injury. At the time, Huard's performance at quarterback was one of the best in the league, having thrown 11 touchdowns and just one interception, averaging 7.7 yards per pass attempt, and posting a quarterback rating of 98.0 (2nd best rating in the NFL, second to only Peyton Manning).

Additionally, the Chiefs were 5–3 in games started by Huard in 2006. Upon his return, Green struggled and failed to perform at the level of play that he had achieved in previous seasons, throwing seven touchdowns (against nine interceptions) and going 4–4 as a starter. Green's poor play led to Edwards placing more of the offensive burden on the shoulders of Larry Johnson, who ultimately ended up setting a record for rushing attempts in a season.

The Chiefs finished at 9–7, edging out the Denver Broncos (who lost in OT to the San Francisco 49ers in the final game of the season) by divisional tiebreaker for second place in the AFC West, and making the playoffs as the sixth seed in the AFC. This was their first playoff appearance since 2003.

On January 6, 2007, the Chiefs were soundly defeated by the Indianapolis Colts 23–8. In the first half, the Chiefs offense failed to produce a single first down. This was the first time in the modern NFL era (post AFL–NFL merger), and the first time since 1960, that any team had been held without a first down in the first half of a playoff game.

In 2007, Edwards' streak of losses on opening day continued as the Chiefs lost to the Houston Texans 20–3. This loss marked the first time since the opening day of the 1970 season that the Chiefs had lost by a margin of 17 points on opening day, and was the first time in a decade that the Chiefs had been held to three points or less on opening day. The Chiefs under Edwards ended the 2007 season 4–12 with a nine-game losing streak, which tied the then-longest losing streak in the history of the Chiefs franchise.

In the 2007 season, the Chiefs were plagued with quarterback, running back, kicker and offensive coaching controversies. Damon Huard started the season and compiled a 4–5 record. He was benched in favor of Edwards' 2006 draft choice Brodie Croyle, who split time with Huard mid-season, was injured, then finished most of the season. Croyle played in a total of nine games and did not win any. Running back Larry Johnson injured his foot mid-season and was replaced by Priest Holmes who came out of retirement late in the year and was ineffective, averaging just three yards per carry and recording no touchdowns.

Kicker Justin Medlock was Edwards' draft choice but was cut after the first game and replaced by Dave Rayner. He was cut late in the year and replaced with John Carney. Finally, after promoting Mike Solari from offensive line coach to offensive coordinator in 2007, Edwards fired Solari and replaced him with Chan Gailey in early 2008. He also fired his offensive line coach, receivers coach, and running backs coach.

Chiefs owner Clark Hunt set the tone for the 2008 season by expressing his support for Edwards and general manager Carl Peterson and their plan to rebuild the team. However, Clark did warn that he expected the Chiefs to be competitive for a playoff spot.

In an attempt to rebuild the team, the Chiefs cut numerous aging veterans in the offseason, and the team traded Pro Bowl defensive end Jared Allen to the Minnesota Vikings. As a result, Edwards fielded one of the youngest teams in the NFL. Edwards' streak of opening day defeats continued as the Chiefs lost to the New England Patriots 17–10, a defeat mostly overshadowed by Patriots quarterback Tom Brady suffering a season-ending injury off a low hit by Chiefs safety Bernard Pollard. The team eventually skidded to a franchise record of 12 consecutive regular-season defeats. The Chiefs finally ended the streak after defeating the Denver Broncos 33–19 at home on September 28. However, they were defeated the following week at the Carolina Panthers. During that game, the Chiefs managed to gain only 127 total yards, which was their worst offensive performance in 22 years. In a game against the San Diego Chargers on November 9, Edwards opted to go for a 2-point conversion to win (rather than tie the game) after the Chiefs has scored a touchdown to bring the score to 20–19. The controversial decision backfired, as the two-point conversion attempt failed, resulting in another loss. He was fired January 23, 2009.

=== ESPN ===
Edwards was hired in 2009 to be an analyst for the network's NFL Live program.

=== Arizona State ===
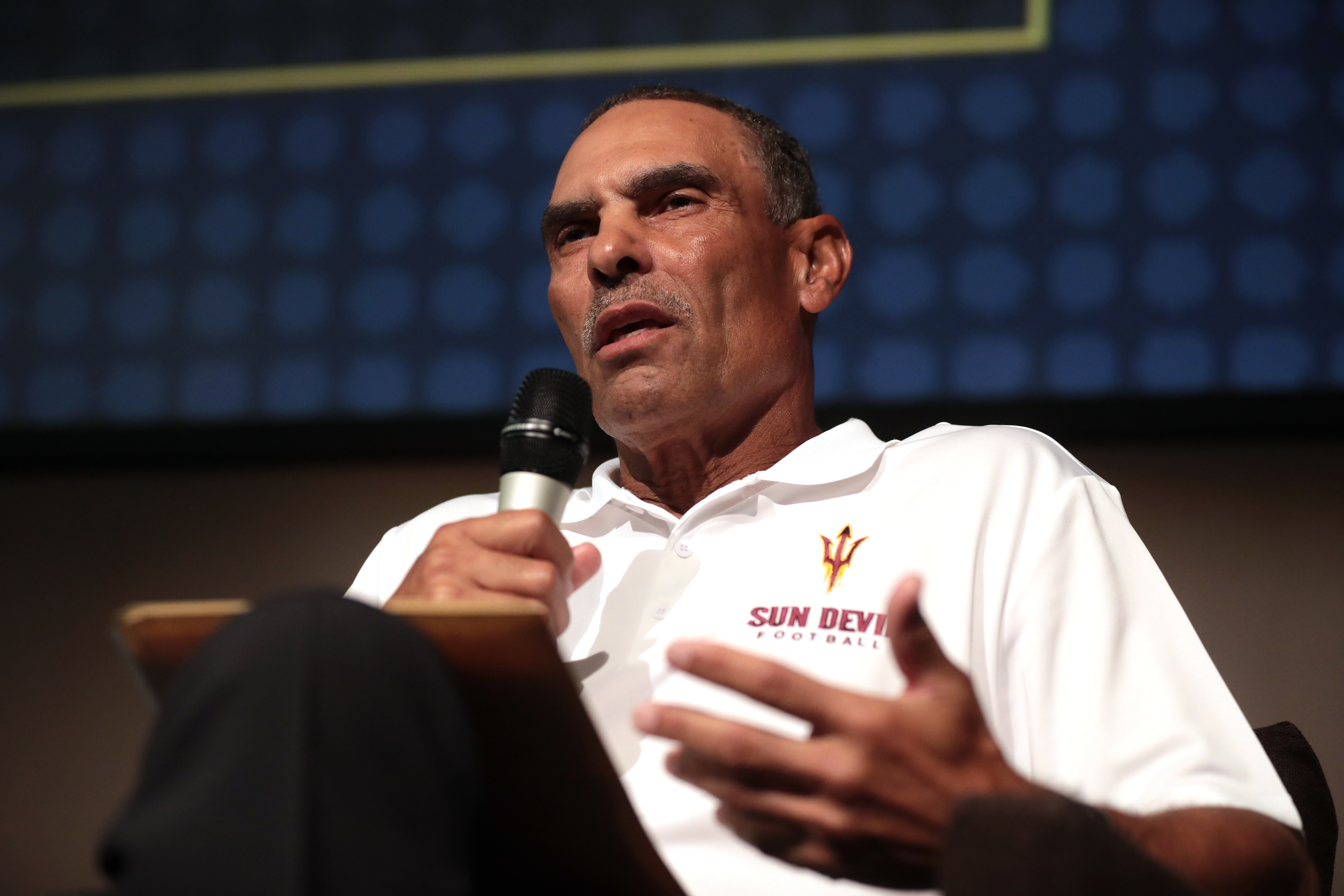
Edwards as Arizona State Sun Devils head coach in 2019

On December 3, 2017, Edwards was named the head coach of the Arizona State football team. Edwards earned his first win with Arizona State on September 1, 2018, against the UTSA Roadrunners. He earned his first win against a ranked opponent on September 8, 2018, against the 15th-ranked Michigan State Spartans. Arizona State finished with a 7–6 record in Edwards' first season.

The 2019 season began with Edwards choosing true freshman Jayden Daniels to quarterback the Sun Devils. Arizona State would start the season with a 3–0 record, including Edwards' second consecutive win over a ranked Michigan State Spartans team. The team finished 8–5 with a Sun Bowl victory against the Florida State Seminoles.

On June 16, 2021, ASU confirmed that NCAA was investigating the football program over recruiting high school players during the COVID-19 dead period in 2020. Throughout the course of the 2021 season, multiple assistant coaches were placed on administrative leave. After the 2021 season had ended, multiple coaches including Zak Hill and Antonio Pierce resigned. 17 players including quarterback Jayden Daniels, wide receiver Johnny Wilson, and All-American linebacker Eric Gentry, entered the transfer portal as a result of the investigation and NIL. Despite the mass exodus, Edwards remained as head coach for the Sun Devils. On September 18, 2022, Arizona State and Edwards mutually agreed to part ways the day after a 30–21 loss to the Eastern Michigan Eagles.

==== NCAA violations and show-cause penalty ====
While Edwards' tenure at ASU included some on-field successes, it was marred by significant controversy and violations of NCAA regulations.

In 2021, reports surfaced about potential recruiting violations under Edwards' during the COVID-19 pandemic. The allegations included hosting recruits on campus during a dead period, which was a direct violation of NCAA rules established to ensure fairness and health safety during the pandemic. These infractions indicated a systemic disregard for NCAA regulations and a culture of non-compliance within the program. Following a detailed investigation, the NCAA was able to corroborate evidence of these violations. It found that Edwards was involved in recruiting violations involving at least 30 prospective Sun Devils during the dead period. Among other things, Edwards went as far as to meet with recruits at a house in Paradise Valley rented for recruiting purposes.

On April 15, 2024, Edwards, who had by then returned to ESPN, accepted a five-year show-cause penalty from the NCAA, severely impacting his career and reputation. The show-cause order, effective until April 15, 2029, requires any NCAA member school that hires Edwards to demonstrate to the NCAA Committee on Infractions why any penalties imposed on Edwards should not follow him from Arizona State despite his involvement in major violations. The NCAA found his contacts with recruits during a dead period so egregious that it added an unusual stipulation to Edwards' show-cause. If Edwards gets a job at another NCAA member school while the show-cause is in effect, he will be suspended for the first season of his return. Six of Edwards' staffers, including Hill, were hit with show-cause orders ranging from three and ten years. The full penalty was not publicly announced until October until the case against another former assistant, Antonio Pierce, was resolved; Pierce was hit with an eight-year show-cause order. This penalty is among the most severe sanctions the NCAA can impose on an individual coach. Most schools will not even consider hiring a coach with a show-cause on his record, effectively blackballing him from the collegiate ranks at least for the duration of the show-cause (in Edwards' case, at least through the 2029 season). A school that hires a coach under a show-cause can be penalized merely for hiring him, and can be severely punished if he commits additional violations while the show-cause order is still in effect. Most schools are reluctant to hire a coach who has been show-caused even after the penalty expires; only one coach has ever returned to Division I football after receiving a show-cause.

Additionally, Arizona State vacated all but one of its wins for 2021 and 2022, making the 2021 season "officially" the Sun Devils' first winless season since 1937. It also disassociated itself from Jayden Daniels' mother, Regina Jackson, who paid for flights and hotel rooms for recruits who came to Tempe during the dead period. Earlier, the Sun Devils had withdrawn from bowl consideration for the 2023 season.

== "Hermisms" ==
Edwards is known for his motivational speeches and soundbites given at press conferences, such as "a goal without a plan is a wish". The popularity of Edwards' motivational speaking has even led to the publication of his own book of quotes.

== Personal life ==
Edwards was born in Fort Monmouth, New Jersey. He is the son of Master Sergeant Herman Edwards Sr., and his wife, Martha. He grew up in Seaside, California and attended Monterey High School.

Edwards graduated from San Diego State University with a degree in criminal justice. He and his wife Lia have two daughters, Gabrielle and Vivian. Edwards has a son, Marcus, from a previous relationship.

Edwards has a "tradition" of not watching the Super Bowl until he himself participates in one. Edwards did not even watch his friends Tony Dungy and Lovie Smith participate in Super Bowl XLI. Dungy had a tradition much like what Edwards does, that is, with the exceptions of Dungy's victories in both Super Bowls XIII and XLI. Edwards broke that tradition when, to serve in his capacity as an analyst for ESPN, he watched Super Bowl XLIV in 2010.

Edwards has a strict workout regimen that has him in the gym at 5:00 AM six days a week. Instead of wearing athletic sneakers with his coaching attire, Edwards wears dress shoes. Before every game, Edwards polishes the shoes himself.

Known widely for his enthusiasm and faith-based personality, Edwards was born and raised a Baptist, but converted with his family and is now a practicing Catholic.

Edwards appeared in "Broke", a 2012 episode of ESPN's 30 for 30 series of sports documentaries, about the high rates of bankruptcy and poor financial decisions amongst professional athletes. In 2013, Edwards served as a head coach in the NFLPA Collegiate Bowl. Herm was named senior adviser to the proposed Major League Football in 2015; however this league never materialized.

He currently resides in San Rafael, California.

== Head-coaching record ==
=== NFL ===
Team	Year	Regular season					Postseason			
Team	Year	Won	Lost	Ties	Win %	Finish	Won	Lost	Win %	Result
NYJ	2001	10	6	0	.625	3rd in AFC East	0	1	.000	Lost to Oakland Raiders in AFC Wild Card game
NYJ	2002	9	7	0	.562	1st in AFC East	1	1	.500	Lost to Oakland Raiders in AFC Divisional Game
NYJ	2003	6	10	0	.375	4th in AFC East	–	–	–	–
NYJ	2004	10	6	0	.625	2nd in AFC East	1	1	.500	Lost to Pittsburgh Steelers in AFC Divisional Game
NYJ	2005	4	12	0	.250	4th in AFC East	–	–	–	–
NYJ Total		39	41	0	.487		2	3	.400	
KC	2006	9	7	0	.562	2nd in AFC West	0	1	.000	Lost to Indianapolis Colts in AFC Wild Card Game
KC	2007	4	12	0	.250	3rd in AFC West	–	–	–	–
KC	2008	2	14	0	.125	4th in AFC West	–	–	–	–
KC Total		15	33	0	.313		0	1	.000	
Total		54	74	0	.422		2	4	.333	

=== College ===
Year	Team	Overall	Conference	Standing	Bowl/playoffs
Arizona State Sun Devils (Pac-12 Conference) (2018–2022)
2018	Arizona State	7–6	5–4	2nd (South)	L Las Vegas
2019	Arizona State	8–5	4–5	T–3rd (South)	W Sun
2020	Arizona State	2–2	2–2	4th (South)	
2021	Arizona State	0–5 (Note: All 8 wins vacated due to NCAA violations)	0–3	T–2nd (South)	L Las Vegas
2022	Arizona State	1–2 (Note: Edwards was fired after three games.)	0–0		
Arizona State:		18–20	11–14		
Total:		18–20			
