= Ron Jaworski =

American football player and analyst (born 1951)

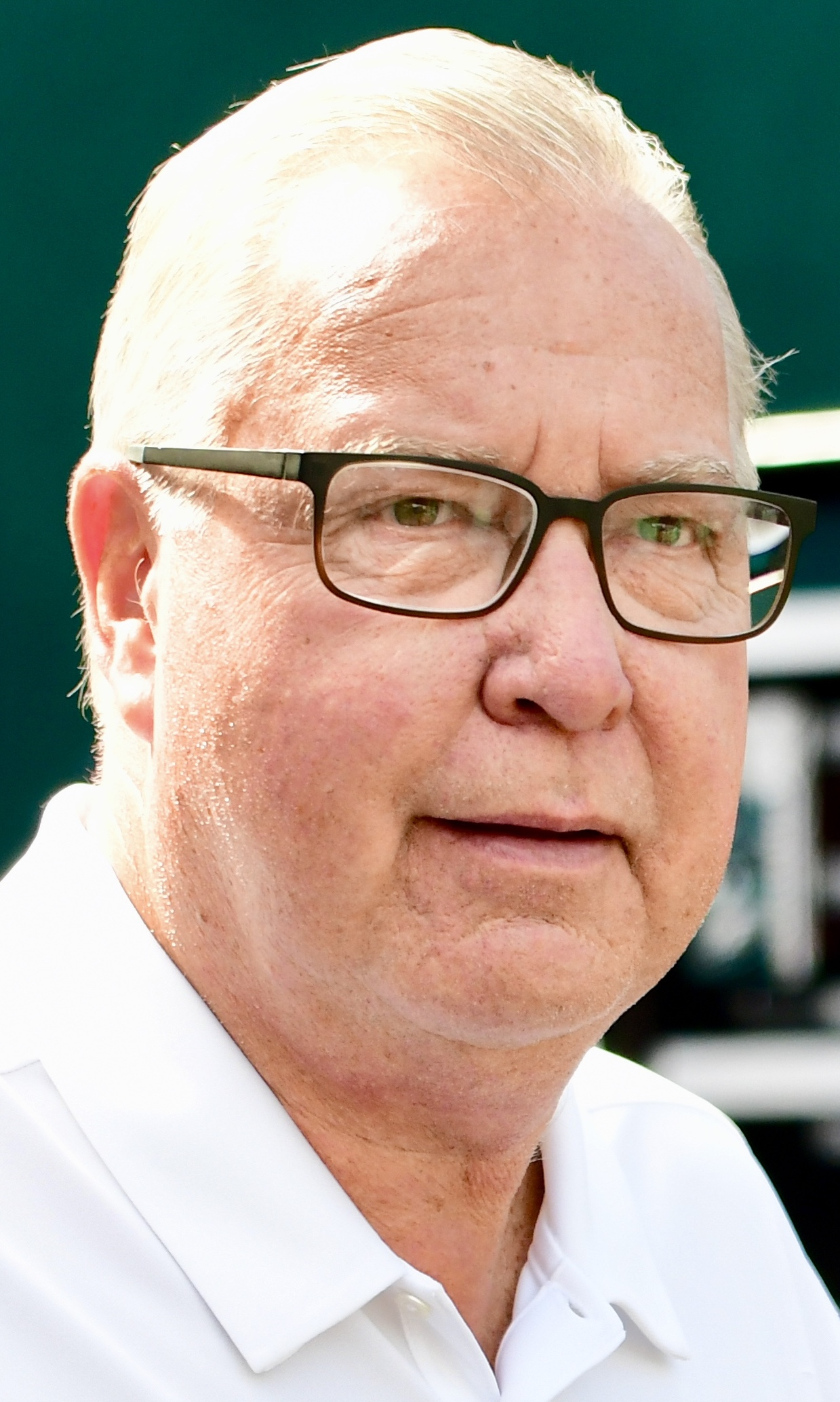
- Jaworski in 2019

No. 16, 7, 17
- Position: Quarterback

Personal information
- Born: March 23, 1951 (age 75); Lackawanna, New York, U.S.
- Listed height: 6 ft 2 in (1.88 m)
- Listed weight: 196 lb (89 kg)

Career information
- High school: Lackawanna
- College: Youngstown State (1969–1972)
- NFL draft: 1973: 2nd round, 37th overall pick

Career history

Playing
- Los Angeles Rams (1973–1976); Philadelphia Eagles (1977–1986); Miami Dolphins (1987–1988); Kansas City Chiefs (1989)

Operations
- Philadelphia Soul (2004–2009) President and co-owner; Philadelphia Soul (2011–2019) Majority owner; Arena Football League (2018–2019) Chairman of the Executive Committee; Albany Empire (2018–2019) Partner owner; Atlantic City Blackjacks (2019) Partner owner

Awards and highlights
- As a player: Pro Bowl (1980); Bert Bell Award (1980); Philadelphia Eagles Hall of Fame; NFL record: Longest touchdown pass: 99 yards (tied); As an executive: 3× ArenaBowl champion (XXII, XXIX, XXX)

Career NFL statistics
- Passing attempts: 4,117
- Passing completions: 2,187
- Completion percentage: 53.1%
- TD–INT: 179–164
- Passing yards: 28,190
- Passer rating: 72.8
- Stats at Pro Football Reference

Ronald Vincent Jaworski (born March 23, 1951), nicknamed "Jaws", is an American former professional football quarterback who played in the National Football League (NFL) for 17 seasons. He played college football for the Youngstown State Penguins and was selected by the Los Angeles Rams in the second round of the 1973 NFL draft. After spending four seasons mostly as a backup for the Rams, Jaworski was traded to the Philadelphia Eagles in 1977, where he would lead the Eagles to four consecutive playoff appearances, including a division title and the franchise's first Super Bowl appearance in 1980. After 10 seasons with the Eagles, Jaworski signed with the Miami Dolphins, where he would spend two seasons as a backup.

After his playing career, Jaworski worked as an NFL analyst on ESPN from 1990 to 2017. From 2004 to 2019, he served as an executive of the Philadelphia Soul franchise of the Arena Football League, where he also briefly served as the league's executive committee chair from 2018 to 2019. He is also the founder and CEO of Ron Jaworski Golf, which owns and manages several golf courses across the Philadelphia metropolitan area.

== Early life and college ==
Jaworski was born and raised in Lackawanna, New York. A three-sport star in high school, he turned down a Major League Baseball offer from the St. Louis Cardinals to attend college at Youngstown State University, where he was nicknamed "Rifle Ron" and the "Polish Rifle", a reference to his Polish ethnicity.

At Youngstown State, he showcased his skills as a quarterback for a pass-oriented offense, earning a selection in the Senior Bowl. Jaworski set several school records during his tenure at Youngstown State, including single-season passing completions (139), career passing completions (325), single-season passing yardage (2,123), career passing yardage (4,612), single-season passing touchdowns (18), and career passing touchdowns (32).

== Professional career ==
=== Los Angeles Rams ===
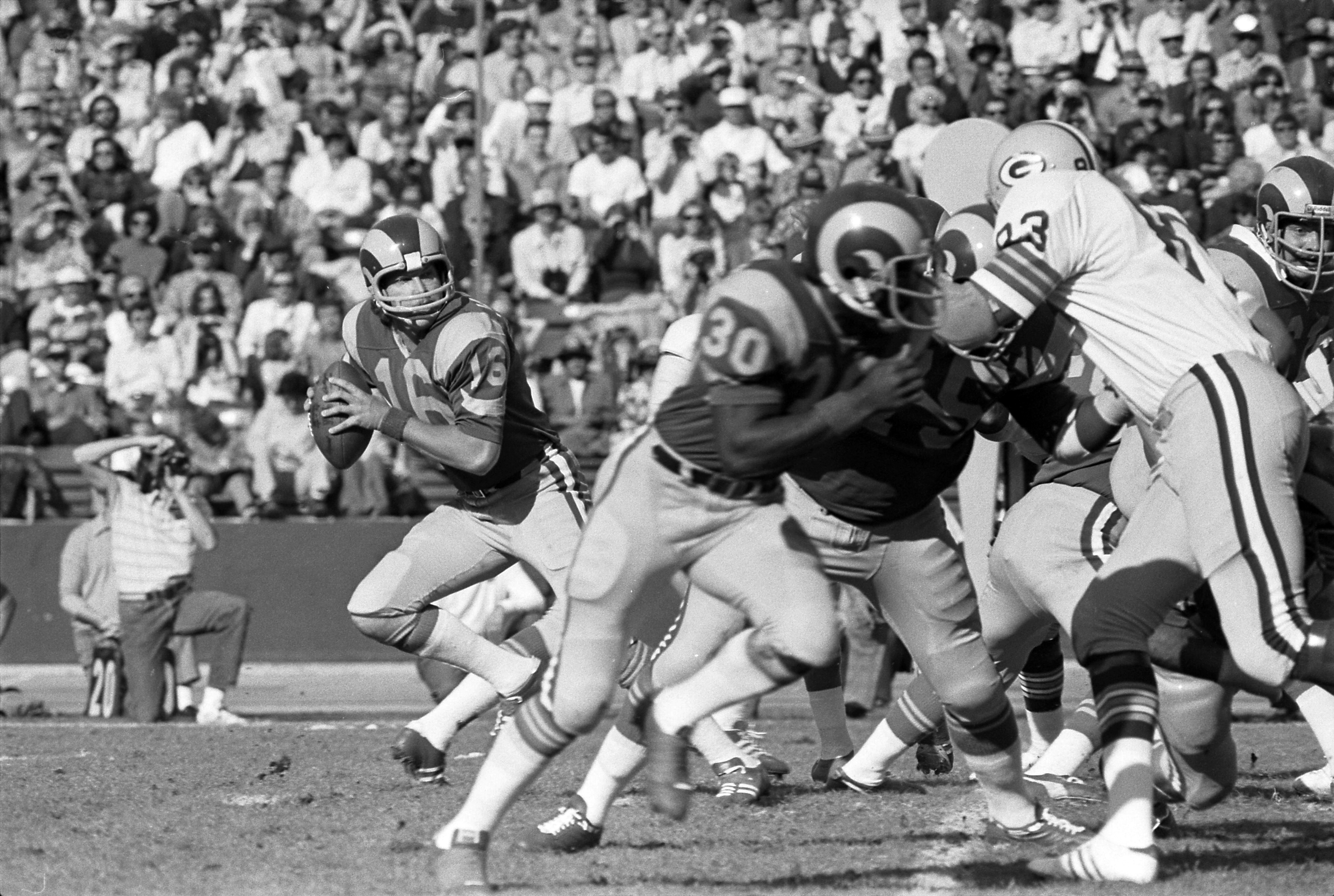
Jaworski playing for the Rams, 1975

Jaworski was selected in the second round of the 1973 NFL draft by the Los Angeles Rams. Jaworski was named the third-string quarterback, backing up John Hadl and James Harris, and only appeared in a total of five games through his first two seasons.

In 1975, Jaworski saw his first major playing time in Week 13, when starter James Harris suffered a shoulder injury three plays into the game. Jaworski led the Rams to a 22–5 victory over the Green Bay Packers, where he completed 14-of-24 passes for 174 yards and an interception. The next week, Jaworski made his first career start for the final week of the season, where he led the Rams to a 10–3 win over the Pittsburgh Steelers.

Entering the playoffs, there was speculation as to whether James Harris was healed enough to return or if Jaworski would start for the divisional round game against the St. Louis Cardinals. It was only minutes before gametime when Jaworski was informed by head coach Chuck Knox that he would be starting. In his playoff debut, Jaworski completed 12-of-23 passes for 203 yards with both a passing and rushing touchdown, en route to a 35–23 victory that advanced the Rams to the NFC Championship Game. Despite Jaworski's performance, he was not named the starter for the NFC Championship, as James Harris was deemed healthy enough to return. However, Harris reaggravated his shoulder injury after just two passes in the game, and Jaworski came in as a backup. He completed 11-of-22 passes for 147 yards, but threw two interceptions in the 37–7 loss to the Dallas Cowboys.

Entering the 1976 season, Jaworski was named the Week 1 starter after James Harris fractured his thumb. In the season opener against the Atlanta Falcons, however, Jaworski left the game due to a fractured right shoulder. Backup Pat Haden relieved Jaworski, and led the Rams to a 30–14 victory. In Week 6 against the Chicago Bears, Haden was injured, and Jaworski, although not yet fully recovered, came in and preserved a 20–12 victory. Jaworski started the next week against the New Orleans Saints, but he was benched for Haden in the fourth quarter after completing just 3-of-11 passes for 15 yards. James Harris would start at quarterback for the next two games before Pat Haden became the starter for remainder of the season. Jaworski would only appear in spot duty in two other games.

=== Philadelphia Eagles ===
==== 1977–1979 ====
Jaworski was traded from the Rams to the Philadelphia Eagles for former All-Pro tight end Charle Young on 9 March 1977. Jaworski would be reunited with former Rams quarterbacks coach Dick Vermeil, who was now the head coach for the Eagles.

In the 1977 season, Jaworski started all 14 games for the Eagles, leading them to a 5–9 record on the season. In 1978, Jaworski led the Eagles to a 9–7 record, clinching both a wild card spot and the franchise's first postseason appearance in 18 years. In the Wild Card game against the Atlanta Falcons, Jaworski helped the Eagles jump to a 13–0 lead that they would hold into the fourth quarter. However, Steve Bartkowski and the Falcons responded late with two touchdowns, and although Jaworski brought the Eagles to the Falcons' 16-yard-line with just 13 seconds to play, punter/kicker Mike Michel missed what would have been a game-winning 34-yard field goal, and the Eagles fell 14–13. As of 2024, this Falcons-Eagles playoff game is believed to be first and only time in NFL history where both starting quarterbacks were of Polish heritage.

In 1979, Jaworski led the Eagles to an 11–5 record and a second-straight wild card berth. In the Wild Card game against the Chicago Bears, Jaworski led the Eagles out of a 17–10 halftime deficit as the Eagles rallied to beat the Bears 27–17. Jaworski completed 12-of-23 passes for 204 passing yards with three touchdowns and one interception. In the divisional round game against the Tampa Bay Buccaneers, the Eagles quickly fell behind to a 17–0 deficit. Despite an attempted comeback led by Jaworski, the Eagles fell to the Buccaneers 24–17.

==== 1980: Super Bowl appearance ====
In 1980, Jaworski saw perhaps his most successful season in the NFL. The Eagles started out 11–1, en route to a 12–4 record and a NFC East division title. Jaworski threw for 3,529 yards and 27 touchdowns, and received multiple honors, including the Bert Bell Award, the NFC Offensive Player of the Year Award from UPI, and a selection to the Pro Bowl. Jaworski also finished third in AP NFL MVP voting. Facing the Minnesota Vikings in the divisional round, the Eagles trailed 14–7 at halftime, but Jaworski and the Eagles responded by outscoring the Vikings 24–2 in the second half, resulting in a 31–16 Eagles win. Jaworski completed 17 of 38 passes for 190 passing yards with one touchdown and two interceptions.

In the NFC Championship Game, the Eagles would face their division rival, the Dallas Cowboys. In frigid conditions at Veterans Stadium, the Eagles pulled off a strong rushing attack as they went on to defeat the Cowboys 20–7, advancing to their first ever Super Bowl in franchise history.

The Eagles went into Super Bowl XV as slight favorites over the AFC-champion Oakland Raiders. However, Jaworski and the Eagles struggled, as the Eagles suffered four turnovers and fell behind to a 14–3 halftime deficit. From there, the Raiders kept on with their attack to prevail 27–10 over the Eagles. Jaworski completed 18-of-38 passes for 291 yards while throwing a touchdown and three interceptions with a lost fumble.

==== 1981–1986 ====
In 1981, Jaworski led the Eagles to another strong start to the season, going 7–1 through the first eight games. However, the Eagles went 3–5 in the second half of the season, but still clinched a wild card spot for their fourth consecutive playoff appearance. In the Wild Card game against the New York Giants, the Eagles were unable to overcome 20 first quarter points scored by New York, and despite their best efforts, they ultimately fell to the Giants 27–21. Jaworski went 13-of-24 for 154 yards and one touchdown.

In the 1982 strike-shortened season, Jaworski led the Eagles to a 3–6 record, as the Eagles missed the playoffs for the first time since 1977. Following the season, Eagles head coach Dick Vermeil retired, and was replaced by defensive coordinator Marion Campbell.

Jaworski and the Eagles' struggles continued into 1983, as the Eagles posted a 5–11 record. In 1984, Jaworski led the Eagles to a 5–7–1 record before he suffered a broken left leg in Week 13 against his former team, the Los Angeles Rams. Jaworski's injury ended both his season and his streak of 116 consecutive starts, an NFL record for quarterbacks at the time that stood until 1999, when it was broken by Packers quarterback Brett Favre.

In the second round of the 1985 NFL draft, the Eagles selected quarterback Randall Cunningham. Despite the selection, Jaworski was still intended to be the starter for the Eagles, although Cunningham was intended to be Jaworski's successor in the future. However, after a poor performance in Jaworski's return from his leg injury in the 1985 season opener, he was benched and replaced by Randall Cunningham for Week 2. Jaworski returned to significant playing time in Week 5, when Cunningham was benched in the second quarter due to poor play. Jaworski threw for three touchdowns in the 23–21 loss to the New Orleans Saints, and was subsequently named the starter for the remainder of the season. In Week 7, Jaworski was named the NFC Offensive Player of the Week after a 16–14 victory over the Dallas Cowboys, where he threw for 380 yards and one touchdown. In a Week 10 game against the Atlanta Falcons, he tied an NFL record with a game-winning, 99-yard touchdown pass in overtime to Mike Quick. Jaworski would lead the Eagles to a 7–9 finish on the season, finishing 6–6 as the starter.

At the end of the 1985 season, head coach Marion Campbell was fired and was replaced by former Chicago Bears defensive coordinator Buddy Ryan. Leading up to the 1986 season, Ryan had planned for recently acquired quarterback Matt Cavanaugh to be the team's starter, however, Ryan ultimately changed his mind days before the season opener, and he named Jaworski the starter. Jaworski led the Eagles to a 2–4 start before he was sidelined due to an elbow injury he suffered just before a Week 7 game against the Dallas Cowboys. Jaworski returned the next week, but was injured again after hurting his finger in Week 10 against the New York Giants. The injury would end Jaworski's season, as Randall Cunningham would replace him.

After the 1986 season, Jaworski was released by the Eagles after ten seasons with the team. He finished with a 69–67–1 record as the Eagles' starter, and held the franchise records for quarterback wins, passing yards, pass completions, pass attempts, and passing touchdowns at the time of his release. Although each of these records were eventually broken by Donovan McNabb, Jaworski still ranks second as of 2024.

=== Miami Dolphins ===
In August 1987, Jaworski signed with the Miami Dolphins to backup quarterback Dan Marino. Jaworski did not appear in any games in the 1987 season, and appeared in two games during the 1988 season. He was released by the Dolphins following the 1988 season.

=== Kansas City Chiefs ===
In August 1989, Jaworski signed with the Kansas City Chiefs. While initially backing up quarterback Steve DeBerg, Jaworski made his first start in three years in Week 4 after DeBerg was benched due to poor play. Jaworski went 1–2 as starter, but suffered a sprained knee in Week 6 against the Los Angeles Raiders. Steve DeBerg returned as the starter for the Chiefs, and Jaworski did not appear in a game for the remainder of the season.

=== Retirement ===
Following the 1989 season, Jaworski contemplated retirement, and he was seen as a potential candidate to replace James Florio in the United States House of Representatives. He ultimately never ran for the seat, but he was waived by the Chiefs in July 1990 and subsequently retired from professional football. In his 17-season career, Jaworski threw for 28,190 yards, 179 touchdowns, and 164 interceptions, while also rushing for 859 yards and 16 touchdowns.

== Career statistics ==
Legend
**Bold**	Career high

=== Regular season ===
Year	Team	Games			Passing							Rushing			
Year	Team	GP	GS	Record	Cmp	Att	Pct	Yds	TD	Int	Rtg	Att	Yds	Avg	TD
1973	LAR	0	0	—	Did not play										
1974	LAR	5	0	—	10	24	41.7	144	0	1	44.4	7	34	4.9	1
1975	LAR	14	1	1–0	24	48	50.0	302	0	2	52.6	12	33	2.8	2
1976	LAR	5	2	2–0	20	52	38.5	273	1	5	22.8	2	15	**7.5**	1
1977	PHI	14	14	5–9	166	346	48.0	2,183	18	**21**	60.4	40	127	3.2	**5**
1978	PHI	**16**	**16**	9–7	206	398	51.8	2,487	16	16	67.9	30	79	2.6	0
1979	PHI	**16**	**16**	11–5	190	374	50.8	2,669	18	12	76.8	**43**	119	2.8	2
1980	PHI	**16**	**16**	**12–4**	**257**	451	57.0	**3,529**	**27**	12	91.0	27	95	3.5	1
1981	PHI	**16**	**16**	10–6	250	461	54.2	3,095	23	20	73.8	22	128	5.8	0
1982	PHI	9	9	3–6	167	286	58.4	2,076	12	12	77.5	10	9	0.9	0
1983	PHI	**16**	**16**	5–11	235	446	52.7	3,315	20	18	75.1	25	**129**	5.2	1
1984	PHI	13	13	5–7–1	234	427	54.8	2,754	16	14	73.5	5	18	3.6	1
1985	PHI	**16**	12	6–6	255	**484**	52.7	3,450	17	20	70.2	17	35	2.1	2
1986	PHI	10	9	3–6	128	245	52.2	1,405	8	6	70.2	13	33	2.5	0
1987	MIA	0	0	—	Did not play										
1988	MIA	**16**	0	—	9	14	**64.3**	123	1	0	**116.1**	—	—	—	—
1989	KC	6	3	1–2	36	61	59.0	385	2	5	54.3	4	5	1.3	0
Career		188	143	73–69–1	2,187	4,117	53.1	28,190	179	164	72.8	257	859	3.3	16

=== Postseason ===
Year	Team	Games			Passing							Rushing			
Year	Team	GP	GS	Record	Cmp	Att	Pct	Yds	TD	Int	Rtg	Att	Yds	Avg	TD
1975	LAR	2	1	1–0	23	45	51.1	350	1	2	66.0	**8**	19	2.4	**1**
1976	LAR	1	0	—	—	—	—	—	—	—	—	—	—	—	—
1978	PHI	1	1	0–1	19	35	**54.3**	190	1	0	79.5	1	3	3.0	0
1979	PHI	2	2	1–1	27	62	43.5	403	**5**	1	85.6	4	**20**	**5.0**	0
1980	PHI	**3**	**3**	**2–1**	**44**	**105**	41.9	**572**	2	**7**	38.3	3	2	0.7	0
1981	PHI	1	1	0–1	13	24	54.2	154	1	0	**87.8**	5	6	1.2	0
Career		10	8	4–4	126	271	46.5	1669	10	10	63.4	21	50	2.4	1

== Awards and honors ==
- Pro Bowl (1980)
- Bert Bell Award (1980)
- NFC champion (1980)
- UPI NFC Player of the Year (1980)
- Ed Block Courage Award (1985)
- Youngstown State Athletics Hall of Fame (1986)
- National Polish-American Sports Hall of Fame (1991)
- Philadelphia Eagles Hall of Fame (1992)
- Philadelphia Sports Hall of Fame (2017)
- National Quarterback Club Hall of Fame (2022)
- New Jersey Hall of Fame (2022)

== Post-playing career ==
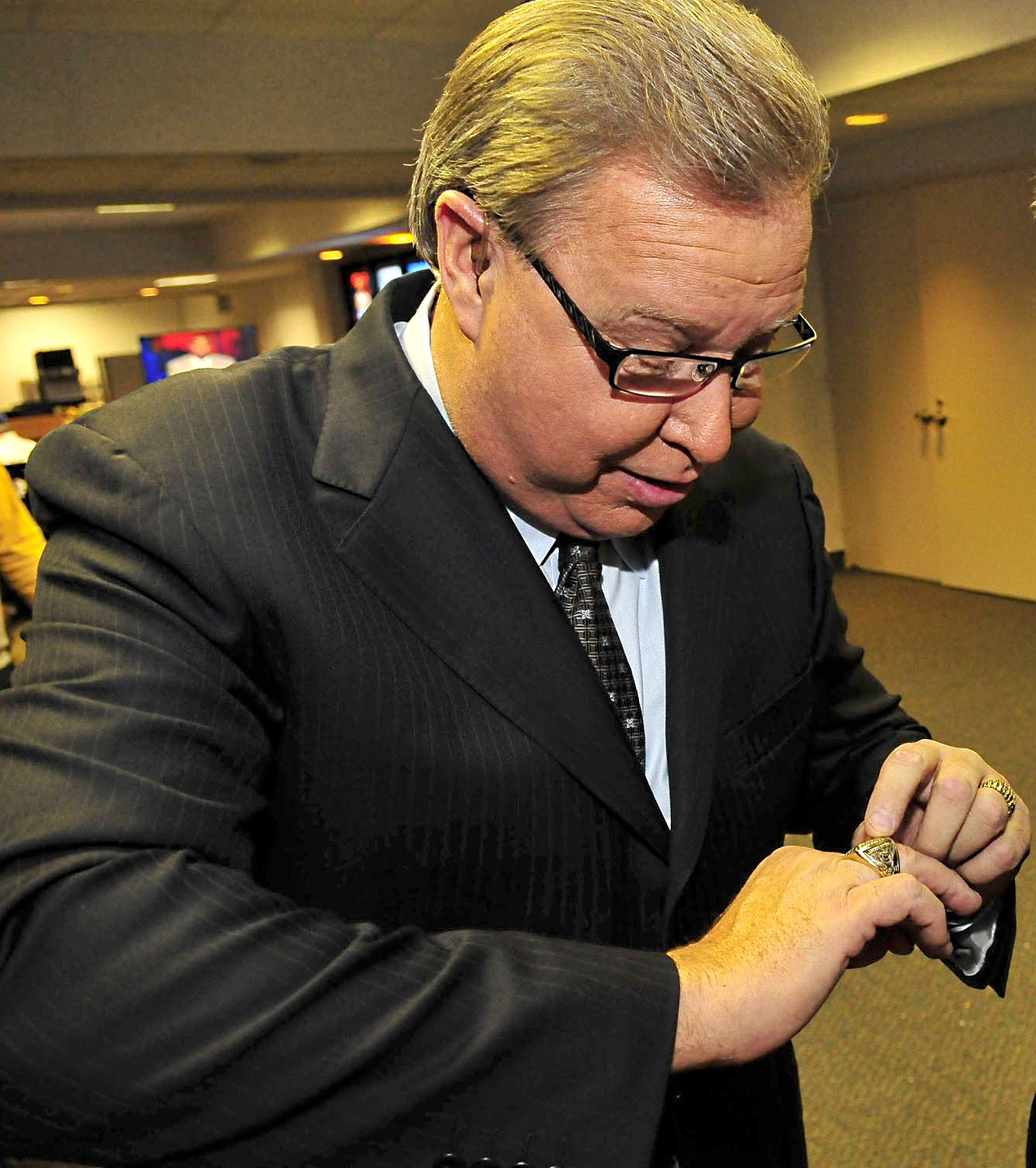
Jaworski displaying his NFC Championship ring in 2008

=== Broadcasting ===
Following his retirement, Jaworski joined ESPN as an NFL studio analyst in 1990. He mainly appeared as an analyst on NFL Matchup, where he was noted for his skill in breaking down teams' strategies and gameplans. Jaworski also served as a reporter on Sunday NFL Countdown. In 2006, Jaworski worked a game as a color commentator with Brad Nessler and Dick Vermeil during the opening-night doubleheader of Monday Night Football. The next season, Jaworski was selected to replace Joe Theismann as a full-time color commentator for Monday Night Football, where he would work alongside Mike Tirico and Tony Kornheiser. In 2009, Kornheiser was replaced by Jon Gruden as the other color commentator on the broadcast with Jaworski. Following the 2011 season, ESPN announced that the Monday Night Football broadcast team would be reduced to just Tirico and Gruden. Jaworski, however, signed a five-year contract extension with ESPN to remain as an NFL analyst on other programming. In 2017, it was reported that Jaworski, along with a number of other ESPN analysts, would be laid off by the network. Jaworski himself was not aware of his future with the network, as he was still under contract with ESPN. Reports eventually came out that ESPN wanted to retain Jaworski, but parent company Disney ultimately blocked it.

Jaworski also worked as a color commentator for Tampa Bay Buccaneers preseason games on WFLA-TV from 2003 to 2006.

Jaworski frequently appeared on 97.5 The Fanatic as an Eagles analyst, and hosted The Ron Jaworski Show on the station from 2019 to 2021.

Since 2022, Jaworski has worked for NBC Sports Philadelphia as an analyst on Eagles Pregame Live and Eagles Postgame Live, where he works alongside Michael Barkann, Barrett Brooks, and Reuben Frank. Also since 2022, Jaworski has also appeared as a weekly guest on Joe DeCamara and Jon Ritchie's show on 94.1 WIP.

=== Golf ===
Throughout his NFL career, Jaworski was an avid golfer, as he spent many off-days at courses. While with the Eagles in 1979, Jaworski and teammate John Bunting managed a golf club in Jenkintown, Pennsylvania. In 1984, Jaworski purchased a club in Gloucester County, New Jersey, which is today Tall Pines State Preserve. Today, Jaworski is the CEO of Ron Jaworski Golf, which is based in Mount Laurel, New Jersey. The company owns and operates eight courses throughout Pennsylvania, Delaware, and New Jersey, including: Blue Heron Pines Golf Club in Galloway Township, New Jersey, Back Creek Golf Club in Middletown, Delaware, Downingtown Country Club in Downingtown, Pennsylvania, Honey Run Country Club in York, Pennsylvania, Ramblewood Country Club in Mount Laurel, New Jersey, RiverWinds Golf Tennis Club in West Deptford Township, New Jersey, Running Deer Golf Club in Pittsgrove Township, New Jersey, and Valleybrook Country Club in Blackwood, New Jersey.

=== Arena Football League ===
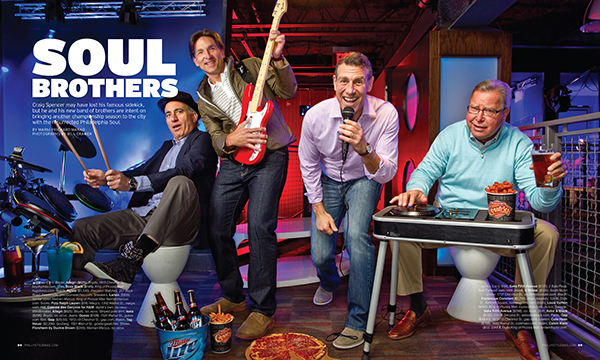
Cosmo DeNicola, Craig Spencer, Pete Ciarrocchi, Ron Jaworski in 2011

In 2003, Jaworski, along with an ownership group that included Bon Jovi members Jon Bon Jovi and Richie Sambora, founded the Philadelphia Soul, an expansion franchise in the Arena Football League. The team began play in the 2004 season, and Jaworski served as the team's president until 2009, when the league went into hiatus due to economic issues. After the league returned in 2010, Jaworski led an effort to bring back the Soul, and the team returned to play for the 2011 season. With the departures Bon Jovi and Sambora as co-owners, Jaworski now served as a majority owner of the team alongside Craig Spencer, who was with the previous ownership group. In 2018, Jaworski was appointed to be the chairman of the league's executive committee. Jaworski also helped establish two other teams in the AFL, the Albany Empire in 2018 and the Atlantic City Blackjacks in 2019. He served as a partner owner of both of these franchises, but was not involved in the football operations of the franchises in order to prevent a potential conflict of interest due to his ownership of the Soul. After the 2019 season, however, the league folded, and the Philadelphia Soul, Albany Empire, and Atlantic City Blackjacks each shut down. During Jaworski's time as an executive for the Soul, the team won three ArenaBowl championships (XXII, XXIX, and XXX).

=== Other ventures ===
Jaworski is also a published author. In 2010, his first book, The Games That Changed the Game: The Evolution of the NFL in Seven Sundays, was published. The book highlights seven games in NFL history which greatly changed the strategies and tactics used in professional football.

Jaworski was one of the primary investors and advisors for the Elite Football League of India, which was founded in 2011. Other prominent investors in the league included Brandon Chillar, Mike Ditka, Michael Irvin, Mark Wahlberg, and Kurt Warner.

Jaworski runs the Jaws Youth Playbook, a charity foundation that assists at-risk youth in the Delaware Valley.

== Personal life ==
As of 2023, Jaworski lives in Medford, New Jersey. He and his wife, Liz, have three children.

While Jaworski played for the Eagles, he was friends and next-door neighbors with former Philadelphia 76ers guard Doug Collins. Collins is credited with coining Jaworski's now well-known nickname "Jaws".
