= Mike Michel =

American football player (born 1954)

No. 17, 2
- Position: Punter

Personal information
- Born: August 4, 1954 (age 72); Ventura, California, U.S.
- Listed height: 5 ft 10 in (1.78 m)
- Listed weight: 177 lb (80 kg)

Career information
- High school: Buena (Ventura)
- College: Stanford
- NFL draft: 1977: 5th round, 113th overall pick

Career history
- Miami Dolphins (1977); Philadelphia Eagles (1978)

Career NFL statistics
- Punts: 93
- Punting yards: 3,416
- Average punt: 36.7
- Longest punt: 61
- Points scored: 9
- Stats at Pro Football Reference

Michael Walter Michel (born August 4, 1954) is an American former professional football player who was a punter for two seasons in the National Football League (NFL). He played college football for the Stanford Cardinal. He was selected by the Miami Dolphins in the fifth round of the 1977 NFL draft, and played for the Dolphins in 1977 and Philadelphia Eagles in 1978.

== Professional career ==
Michel was selected in the 5th round, 113th overall, by the Miami Dolphins in 1977 NFL draft. After performing as the Dolphins' primary punter in 1977, he was released before the start of the 1978 season. The Philadelphia Eagles signed him before a week 7 game against the Washington Redskins due to poor play by their previous punter Rick Engles. Michel lined up to punt five times in his Eagles debut, and had three punts go for 9 yards, 26 yards, and one complete miss. In a week 12 game against the New York Giants on November 19, 1978, the Eagles' regular placekicker Nick Mike-Mayer suffered fractured ribs early in the game, ending his season. Michel took over his placekicking duties for the rest of the game, converting his only point after touchdown (PAT) attempt. The Eagles chose not to sign a new kicker following the dramatic win, opting instead to go with Michel as the primary placekicker for the remainder of the season. Michel went 8-of-11 on PATs the rest of the season, including missing one in each of the final three games of the season. He did not attempt a field goal in the regular season.

The Eagles made the playoffs for the first time since 1960, securing a game in Atlanta against the Atlanta Falcons in the Wild Card round on December 24, 1978. In the game, Michel missed a PAT and a field goal before lining up to kick a potential game-winning 34-yard field goal with seven seconds left in the fourth quarter. He missed the kick, and the Eagles lost 14−13. Talking to reporters after the game, he said "This is something I've got to live with for the rest of my life." He was released after the season and did not play in another NFL game.
