= Mike Hogan (American football) =

American football player (born 1954)

No. 30, 35, 49, 45
- Position: Running back

Personal information
- Born: November 1, 1954 (age 72); Rome, Georgia, U.S.
- Listed height: 6 ft 2 in (1.88 m)
- Listed weight: 213 lb (97 kg)

Career information
- High school: East Rome
- College: Chattanooga
- NFL draft: 1976: 9th round, 247th overall pick

Career history
- Philadelphia Eagles (1976–1978); San Francisco 49ers (1979); New York Giants (1980); Philadelphia Eagles (1980)

Career NFL statistics
- Rushing attempts: 466
- Rushing yards: 1,835
- Total touchdowns: 8
- Stats at Pro Football Reference

Michael L. Hogan (born November 1, 1954) is an American former professional football player who was a running back in the National Football League (NFL) for the Philadelphia Eagles, San Francisco 49ers, and New York Giants. He played college football for the Chattanooga Mocs.
