= Tisch =

Tisch may refer to:

- Tisch School of the Arts at New York University
- Jonathan M. Tisch College of Civic Life at Tufts University
- Tisch Library, the main library of Tufts University
- Tisch, a novel by Stephen Dixon

== People ==
=== Tisch family of American businesspeople ===
- Andrew Tisch, son of Laurence Tisch; co-chair of Loews Corporation
- James S. Tisch (born 1953), son of Laurence Tisch; CEO of Loews Corporation
- Jamie Tisch, wife of Steve Tisch
- Joan Tisch, widow of Preston Robert Tisch
- Jonathan Tisch (born 1953), son of Preston Robert Tisch; chairman and CEO of Loews Hotels
- Merryl Tisch, Chancellor of the New York State Board of Regents
- Laurence Tisch (1923–2003), brother of Preston Robert Tisch; part owner of Loews Corporation
- Preston Robert Tisch (1926–2005), brother of Laurence Tisch; part owner of Loews Corporation
- Steve Tisch (born 1949), son of Preston Robert Tisch; chairman of the New York Giants NFL football team
- Wilma Tisch (1927–2026), wife of Laurence Tisch
- David Tisch (born 1981), grandson of Laurence Tisch; part owner of Loews Corporation
- Jessica Tisch (born 1981), New York City commissioner

=== Others ===
- Charles Tisch (1829–1895), American politician
- Cläre Tisch (1907–1942 or 1943), also known as Kläre Tisch and Klara Tisch, German economist
- Harry Tisch (1927–1995), German trade-union leader
- Lindsay Tisch (born 1947), New Zealand politician
- William F. Tisch (1838–1877), American politician

== See also ==
- Tish (disambiguation)
