= Texas Gas Transmission =

Interstate natural gas pipeline in the United States

Texas Gas Transmission, LLC
- Founded: 1948
- Headquarters: Owensboro, KY, U.S.A.
- Key people: H. Dean Jones II, President
- Products: Natural Gas Pipeline
- Parent: Boardwalk Pipeline Partners, LP
- Website: www.txgt.com

Texas Gas Transmission is a natural gas pipeline which brings gas from the Louisiana Gulf coast up through Arkansas, Mississippi, Tennessee, and Kentucky, to supply gas to Illinois, Indiana, and Ohio. It is owned by Boardwalk Pipelines. Its FERC code is 18.

Texas Gas was created in 1948 with the merger of Memphis Natural Gas Company and Kentucky Natural Gas Corporation. Since that time, Texas Gas has changed ownership four times. The company was bought by CSX Corporation in 1983; by Transco Energy Corp. in 1989; by Williams in 1995; and by Loews Corporation in 2003.
