= Wilma Tisch =

American philanthropist and heiress (1927–2026)

- Born: Wilma Stein; June 25, 1927; Long Branch, New Jersey, U.S.
- Died: June 7, 2026 (aged 98); New York City, U.S.
- Education: Skidmore College
- Occupations: Investor; philanthropist
- Spouse: Laurence Tisch (m. 1948; died 2003)
- Children: 4, including Andrew and James

Wilma "Billie" Tisch (née Stein; June 25, 1927 – June 7, 2026) was an American philanthropist. She was a graduate of Skidmore College and served on its board as well as pursuing many other philanthropic ventures.

== Background ==
Tisch was born on June 25, 1927, in Long Branch, New Jersey, but grew up in Asbury Park, New Jersey. Her father, Joseph Stein, the son of German Jewish immigrants, worked as a journalist and later in the automotive industry and opened the first Cadillac dealership in New Jersey; her mother, Rose Liebesman Stein, was the daughter of Lithuanian Jewish immigrants. Her family belonged to a Conservative synagogue. She had one sister, Myra Cohn. She attended public schools and graduated with a BS from Skidmore College in 1948 with a major in economics and a minor in accounting.

After school, she took a job with Time, Inc as a secretary and soon after was married to Laurence Tisch in 1948. Early in his career, Tisch made his living from kosher Borscht Belt hotels which catered to the Jewish community.

== Philanthropy ==
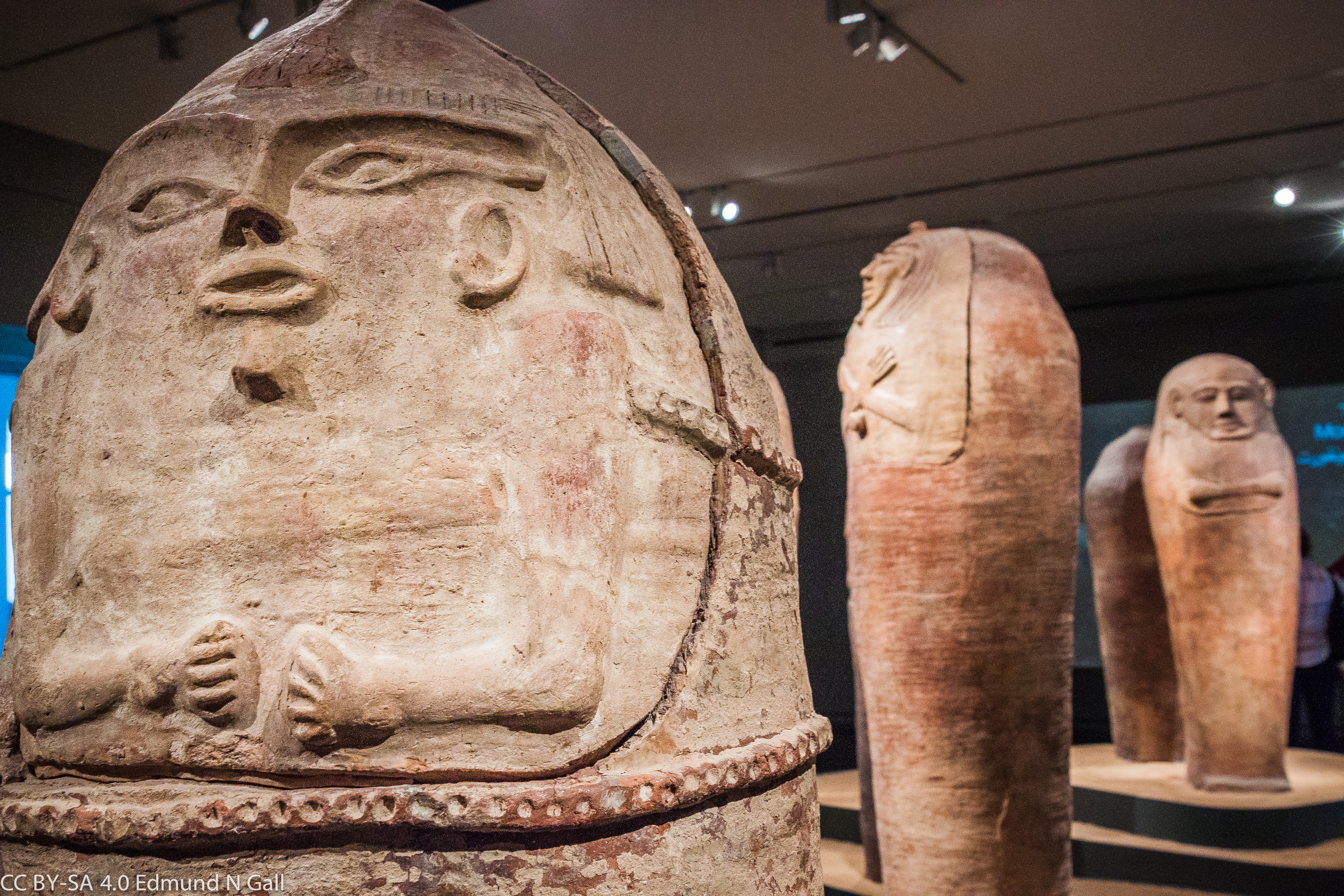
Bronze Age sarcophagi from the Dayan Collection, purchased with funds donated by Wilma and Laurence Tisch, on display at the Israel Museum in Jerusalem.

In 1962, she became a trustee of the Blythedale Children's Hospital in Valhalla, New York, serving on its board of directors. In 1969, she became a member of the Distribution Committee of Federation of Jewish Philanthropies which was responsible for allocating resources to charities that supported the Jewish community. She was instrumental in obtaining Federation sponsorship for Blythedale which also ran a program on joint disease in addition to being a children's hospital. In 1975, she became chairman of the Distribution Committee of the Federation. In 1980, she became the first woman to serve as president of the Federation of Jewish Philanthropies serving until 1983. She also served as the board chairwoman of the WNYC Foundation, Vice Chairman of United Way of New York City, Director of the Tisch Foundation, Trustee of Skidmore College, Trustee of the American Jewish Joint Distribution Committee, Trustee of the September 11th Fund, and served on the Mayor’s Transition Advisory Council of New York City. She and her husband donated $900,000 to the Israel Museum to purchase Moshe Dayan's collection from his widow; the purchase was completed in 1982.

In 1976, she received the Louis Marshall Medal from the Jewish Theological Seminary for "consecrated service to Judaism and the American Jewish Community". In 2006, she received an honorary doctorate from New York University for "extraordinary leadership and generosity across an array of civic and philanthropic endeavors".

== Personal life and death ==
In 1948, Tisch married Laurence Tisch. They had four sons.

- Andrew H. Tisch (born 1949). Co-chair, Loews Corporation 2006-2024. Voluntary leadership positions at Cornell University, Harvard Business School, NYU's Tisch School of the Arts, and Weill Cornell Medicine.
- Daniel Tisch: Managing member, Towerview LLC, a family investment fund. Board member at New York University. Former Board Chair at Suffield Academy, the high school alma mater of all 4 Tisch sons. He is the father of David Tisch.
- James S. Tisch (born 1953): Chairman and former CEO of Loews Corporation. Married to Merryl Tisch. One of his children is Jessica Tisch, the Commissioner of the New York Police Department. Another child, Ben Tisch, became the Loew's CEO in 2025.
- Thomas Jonah Tisch: Managing Partner at Four Partners, a family investment firm. Board member at the NYU Medical Center. Former Brown University Chancellor, co-owner of the New York Sun, and Board member at the Manhattan Institute.

Wilma Tisch died in Manhattan on June 7, 2026, at the age of 98.

== Net worth ==
Per Forbes, she had a net worth of US$1.4 billion (April 2023).
