= Andrew Tisch =

American businessman

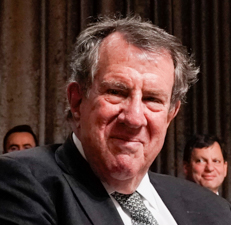
- Tisch in 2019
- Born: August 14, 1949 (age 77)
- Education: Cornell University (BS); Harvard University (MBA)
- Occupation: Businessman
- Known for: Co-chair of the Loews Corporation
- Spouse(s): Susan Hiat (divorced); Ann Rubenstein
- Children: 4
- Parent(s): Larry Tisch; Wilma Stein

Andrew Tisch (born 14 August 1949) is an American businessman, from 2006 to 2024 the co-chair of Loews Corporation, the company founded by his father Laurence Tisch and uncle Preston Tisch. Together with his brother James and his first cousin Jonathan, Andrew Tisch oversees a holding company involved in hotels, oil, and insurance.

== Early life and education ==
Tisch was born in 1949, the son of Wilma (Stein) Tisch and Laurence Tisch. Both his parents were of Jewish descent. He has three brothers: James Tisch, Daniel Tisch (father of David Tisch), and Thomas Jonah Tisch.

Tisch attended Suffield Academy in Suffield, Connecticut and then Cornell University, where he graduated in 1971 with a bachelor's degree. In 1977, he earned an MBA from Harvard University.

== Career ==
Tisch worked for the family business, Loews Corporation, after school. He was president of Bulova from 1979 to 1989; and in 1990, he was named chairman and chief executive officer of Lorillard Tobacco Company where he was until 1995. Testifying under oath before the US Congress in 1994, Tisch said, "I believe that nicotine is not addictive," and when asked whether he knew that cigarettes caused cancer, Tisch answered under oath, "I do not believe that." After the death of his father in 2003 and uncle in 2005, responsibility for the family business was put in the hands of Tisch, his brother, James Tisch, who was CEO, and cousin, Jonathan Tisch, who oversaw the company's hotel business.

At the start of 2025 Andrew became a Director Emeritus, James became sole Chairman, James's son Ben became President and CEO, and Andrew's son Alex became head of the hotel business. Andrew remains a director of CNA Financial.

== Family ==
Tisch's other first cousin—Jon's brother—is Steve Tisch, the movie mogul who produced Forrest Gump, Risky Business, and other big-budget Hollywood films, as well as co-owner of the National Football League's New York Giants. Tisch has two other brothers: Tom Tisch and Dan Tisch. Both own significant stakes in Loews, but are not involved on a day-to-day basis.

== Community service ==
Tisch is active in the City Parks Foundation (chairman), the Wildlife Conservation Society (trustee/secretary), and the New York City Police Foundation (trustee/executive committee). He is on the Dean's Board of Advisors at Harvard Business School, was vice chairman of the Board of Trustees for Cornell University, and is a co-founder of the Young Women's Leadership Foundation. He was the chairman of the Economic Club of New York, a trustee for the Brookings Institution, and a member of the Council on Foreign Relations. Tisch is active in Jewish communal affairs, as a trustee for the American Jewish Joint Distribution Committee; a founding chairman of the Jewish Leadership Forum; and as founder of the Jewish Business Leadership Forum.

== Personal life ==
Tisch has been married twice:

- Susan Hiat Tisch Allen who he has since divorced. They have two children. Both children were married by Susan Hiat's father, a rabbi, at the Central Synagogue in Manhattan. Susan's sister, Merryl Hiat, is married to Andrew's brother, James Tisch.
- Ann Rubenstein Tisch, a former reporter for NBC who co-founded an all-girls public school in Harlem. A graduate of Washington University in St. Louis, she also serves as a trustee of Washington University in St. Louis and serves on the Dean’s Council of New York University Tisch School of the Arts.
