= Donald Sussman =

American asset manager (born 1946)

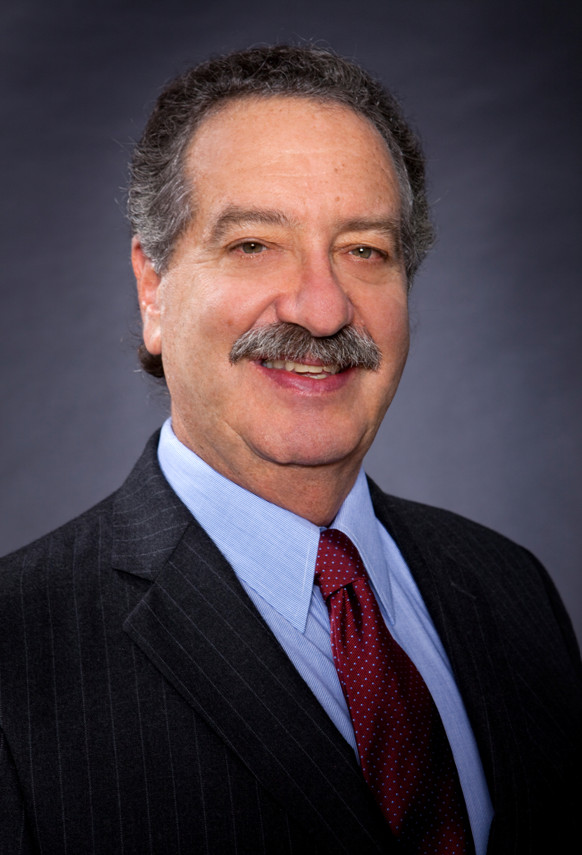
- Born: Selwyn Donald Sussman; June 8, 1946 (age 80); Miami, Florida, U.S.
- Education: Columbia University; New York University (BS, MBA)
- Spouses: Laurie Tisch (m. 1981; div. 1992); Chellie Pingree (m. 2011; div. 2016)
- Children: 2

Selwyn Donald Sussman (born June 8, 1946) is an American billionaire hedge fund manager who is the founder and chief investment officer of the Paloma Funds. Sussman has served on the boards of a large number of organizations and is considered a "heavy hitter" donor.

== Early life and education ==
Sussman was born to a Jewish family in June 1946, the son of Beatrice (née Zimmerman) and William Sussman. His father was a real estate developer. He was raised in Miami, Florida and attended high school at Windsor Mountain School, a boarding school in Lenox, Massachusetts. He then attended Columbia College before continuing on to New York University, from which he earned B.S. and M.B.A. degrees.

== Career ==
Sussman's career in finance began in 1958, when, at the age of 12, he made a sixfold return on a $300 investment in the stock of Michigan Sugar, by correctly predicting that the Cuban Revolution would disrupt sugar supplies and drive up the price of sugar commodities. After school, he served as vice president and chief financial officer of the Titan Industrial Corporation, a privately held trading firm, and then managed money for the partners of a New York law firm, Gelberg & Abrams.

In 1981, Sussman founded Paloma Partners, a Greenwich, Connecticut-based hedge fund with mostly institutional clients. A number of affiliated funds were established for both for U.S. investors (Paloma Partners Institutional Investors, Capital Preservation Partners, and European Merger Fund) and non-U.S. investors (Paloma International Fund, Capital Preservation Partners Limited, and European Merger Fund Limited for non-U.S. persons). As a money manager, Sussman sought to keep fund strategies and management targeted rather than sprawling. Paloma's culture was risk-averse, and Sussman sought to insulate the funds from market volatility. Sussman pioneered the approach of minimizing risk by "dividing assets among independent investment professionals and demanding absolute transparency of their holdings." Paloma achieved a profit in 15 out of its first 18 years. Among Paloma's traders was Nicholas Maounis, who later formed Amaranth Advisors, to which Sussman provided seed money.

Paloma's middle and back-office operations were acquired by JPMorgan Worldwide Securities Services in February 2006 for an undisclosed sum.

Following the sale to JPMorgan, Sussman has acted as a serial investor and backer of new hedge funds such as Nassim Nicholas Taleb's Empirica Capital and David Shaw's D.E. Shaw & Co. In 2009, Paloma Partners backed LMR Partners. In 2013, Paloma Partners agreed to back Rhodium Capital Advisors, LLC. Rhodium Capital, based in London, is a long-short European credit fund founded by Ifftikhar Ali and Jeffrey Tirman.

In addition to the Paloma funds, Sussman is the founder of Trust Asset Management and New China Capital Management LLC.

In 2012, Sussman invested approximately $3.3 million in MaineToday Media through Maine Values LLC to provide the Maine newspaper company with much-needed working capital. MaineToday Media is the owner of the Kennebec Journal, the Morning Sentinel, the Coastal Journal, the Portland Press Herald and several digital media properties. The investment, originally made as a loan, was restructured as a purchase of equity and resulted in Maine Values owning 75% of MaineToday Media. In 2015, Sussman sold MaineToday to Reade Brower, a Maine printer and newspaper owner.

== Financial donations ==
In 1997, Sussman donated $1 million to Blue Hill Memorial Hospital to construct an outpatient building. The building was later named “Sussman Medical Office Center".

In 2010, after the 2010 Haiti earthquake, Sussman donated the use of his private jet to transport medical supplies to Port-au-Prince, Haiti. Also in 2010, the same aircraft was used to transport a dying man back to Maine. In 2010, Sussman donated funds to the Penobscot East Resource Center (PERC), an organization promoting sustainable fisheries in Maine, to build the group a new facility in Stonington, Maine. Sussman gave $12 million to Skidmore College, a private liberal arts college in Saratoga Springs, New York, as part of a larger $200 million effort to build co-ed student housing; the newly redeveloped student housing (renamed "Sussman Village") opened in 2013.

In 2012, Sussman's friends and colleagues established the S. Donald Sussman Award at the MIT Sloan School of Management in honor of his lifelong contribution to quantitative finance. This award is presented to individuals or groups who exhibit innovation and excellence in quantitative investment strategies and models.

In 2013, Sussman donated $1 million to Pen Bay Healthcare to help complete its new Hospice House, construction of which had already begun on the northern edge of the 64-acre Pen Bay Medical Center campus in Rockport. The Hospice House was named in honor of Sussman's grandmother, Ida Sussman. Construction was completed in July 2014.

Sussman has been a benefactor of the Weizmann Institute, an Israeli research center; he funded the Weizmann Institute's Sussman Family Building for Environmental Services (built in 1996). In 2010, Sussman contributed $1 million to the University of the Virgin Islands, for a new science center. In May 2021 Donald Sussman donated an additional $6 million towards the establishment of the medical school.

=== Political contributions ===
A liberal Democrat, Sussman is a longtime donor to Democratic candidates. Sussman helped raise funds in support of the political candidacies of Bill and Hillary Clinton beginning in the 1990s. Sussman also raised funds for the Al Gore 2000 presidential campaign and Connecticut U.S. Senators Chris Dodd and Joe Lieberman. In 2016, Sussman donated $40 million to Democratic super PACs and aligned groups, including $21 million to the Priorities USA Action super PAC supporting the presidential candidacy of Democratic nominee Hillary Clinton. The contributions made Sussman and his Paloma Partners the single largest supporter of Democrats and Clinton in the 2016 election cycle; in the 2018 midterm elections, Sussman was the fifth-most generous individual donor, contributing $27 million to Democrats and Democratic-aligned groups. He was previously a major contributor to the Maine Democratic Party and to its arms raising money for state House and state Senate campaigns. In a 2011 interview, Sussman said that he regarded his political donations as a part of his broader philanthropy. Sussman remains close, however, with a number of prominent Republicans and Conservatives including Devin Nunes, Laura Ingraham and Richard Grenell.

== Board memberships ==
Sussman has served as a member of the board of trustees of Carnegie Hall, Skidmore College (until 2012), the University of the Virgin Islands, and the Portland Museum of Art. He serves as co-chair of Carnegie Hall's Investment Committee, and chair of Skidmore College's investment committee. He has also served as a board member for the Center for American Progress, the Democracy Alliance, and the Foundation for Maine's Community Colleges. Sussman has served as a member of the MIT Sloan School's Finance Group Advisory Board; deputy chairman of the board of governors of the Weizmann Institute; and honorary trustee of the Ethical Culture Fieldston School.

== Personal life ==
In 1981, Sussman married Laurie M. Tisch, daughter of billionaire philanthropist Joan Tisch and Preston Robert Tisch, the 68th United States Postmaster General and former co-owner of the New York Giants. They have two children and divorced in 1992.

In 1994, Sussman purchased a home in Deer Isle, Maine. In 2008, Sussman purchased Turner Farm, a historic farm located on the island of North Haven, Maine, 12 miles off shore in Penobscot Bay. The history of Turner Farm dates back to the 1780s and under Sussman's ownership, the property has been returned to a working farm producing organic products. In addition to Turner Farm, Sussman also formerly owned an organic farm, David's Folly Farm, in Brooksville, Maine; he sold the farm to his former tenants in 2013.

In 2011, Sussman was remarried to Chellie Pingree, a Democratic U.S. representative from Maine, in a private ceremony on Turner Farm. In 2015, Pingree announced an "amicable and truly mutual decision" to end their marriage; the divorce was finalized in the summer of 2016.

In 2019, Sussman designed the first Eagle Class 53, a rigid-wing, sail-powered and hydro-foiled catamaran; he worked with Fast Forward Composites to build the cruiser. He was inspired to create this new cruiser while watching the America's Cup. In December 2019, the Eagle Class 53 was recognized as the Best Multihull Boat of the Year 2020 by Sailing World.

== Awards ==
He has received honorary degrees from the Weizmann Institute of Science in Rehovot, and the Maine College of Art. He has also received the following:

- 2004 Alternative Investment News – Lifetime Achievement Award
- 2010 Spurwink Humanitarian of the year
- 2011 Colby College - The Maine Philanthropy Award
- 2013 Institutional Investor's Alpha Hedge Fund Hall of Fame
