= Tish =

Tish is a feminine given name and a nickname.

== People ==
=== Given name ===
==== Arts and entertainment ====
- Tish Bellomo, former backing vocalist of rock group Blondie
- Tish Ciravolo, bass player and guitar maker
- Tish Cohen (born 1963), Canadian writer
- Tish Daia (1926-2003), Albanian composer
- Leticia Tish Hinojosa (born 1955), American folksinger
- Tish Hyman (born 1983), American singer-songwriter and rapper
- Tish Murtha (1956–2013), British social documentary photographer
- Tish Rabe, American children's book author
- Tish Tash, pseudonym of American film director Frank Tashlin

==== Sport ====
- George Marsden (boxer) (1911-1980), British boxer
- Tish Pike, later name of Patricia Prain (born 1933), New Zealand alpine skier

==== Other ====
- Tish of Chaghaniyan, early 8th century ruler of the Principality of Chaghaniyan
- Letitia Baldrige (1926–2012), American etiquette expert and public relations executive, White House Social Secretary for First Lady Jacqueline Kennedy
- Tish Howard (born 1946), July 1966 Playboy Playmate of the Month
- Letitia James (born 1958), African-American lawyer, activist and politician, New York City Public Advocate
- Letitia Tish Sommers (1914-1985), American author and women's rights activist
- Lutitia "Tish" Harrison Warren (born 1979), American author and Anglican priest

=== Surname ===
- Gideon Tish (born 1939), Israeli footballer
- Gyaldem Tish, stagename of Opare Leticia, Ghanaian musician

== Fictional characters ==
- Letitia Carberry, the protagonist of six novels by Mary Roberts Rinehart
- Petratishkovna "Tish" Katsufrakis, on the animated television series The Weekenders
- Tish Jones, a recurring character in the television series Doctor Who
- Morticia Addams, female lead character in The Addams Family
- Clementine “Tish” Rivers, protagonist of James Baldwin novel If Beale Street Could Talk (1974)

== Other uses ==
- Tish, a gathering of Hasidic Jews
- Tish (2023 documentary), 2023 documentary about Tish Murtha

== See also ==
- Tisch (disambiguation)
- Tisha, a given name
- Trish, a given name
