= Laurie Tisch =

American investor, philanthropist, and billionaire

- Born: 1950 or 1951 (age 75–76)
- Occupations: Investor, philanthropist
- Spouse: Donald Sussman (divorced)
- Children: 2
- Parent(s): Joan Hyman Tisch; Preston Robert Tisch
- Family: Jonathan Tisch (brother); Steve Tisch (brother); Laurence Tisch (uncle); Jamie Tisch (sister-in-law)

Laurie Tisch (born 1951) is an American investor, philanthropist, and billionaire.

== Biography ==
Tisch is the daughter of Joan (née Hyman) (1927–2017) and Preston Robert Tisch (1926–2005). Her father co-founded the Loews Corporation with his brother Laurence Tisch and was a 50% owner of the New York Giants football team. She and her two brothers (Jonathan Tisch and Steve Tisch) inherited her mother's 6% share in Loews after her death, making them billionaires.

In 2007, she founded a charitable foundation, the Laurie M. Tisch Illumination Fund, to increase access and opportunity for all New Yorkers. It aims to foster healthy and vibrant communities with grants and initiatives such as Healthy Food & Community Change, launched in 2013, and Arts in Health, launched in 2018.

In 2021, the Fund asked for proposals from NYC-based arts and cultural organizations to boost mental health for people in historically marginalized and vulnerable communities. In 2022, the Fund awarded grants to 14 organizations.

Tisch is a former co-chair of the board of trustees at the Whitney Museum of American Art and former vice chair of the board of trustees at Lincoln Center for the Performing Arts. She serves on the board of directors at The Juilliard School and The Jewish Communal Fund and is a Trustee of the Aspen Institute.

Tisch is chair emeritus of the Center for Arts Education and the Children's Museum of Manhattan (CMOM). Tisch led CMOM's expansion from a neighborhood-based storefront into a citywide institution that is recognized as a national leader in health, education, and the arts. She co-chairs a capital campaign to build a new home for CMOM on Central Park West and 96th Street, which will also become a base for their citywide programs serving families in the shelter system and incarcerated mothers and fathers and their children. She is also a co-owner and member of the Board of Directors of the New York Football Giants. She and her daughters Emily Tisch Sussman and Carolyn Tisch Blodgett are among the owners of Gotham FC, the NY/NJ National Women's Soccer League team.

Tisch is a recipient of many awards for philanthropy and public service. In December 2018, she received the Key to the City of New York at Gracie Mansion. She was named one of the “50 Most Powerful Women of 2017” by Crain's New York Business, received a Lifetime Achievement Award from the New York Foundation for the Arts, and was honored with the United Way of NYC's 10th Anniversary Power of Women to Make a Difference Award and by the New York Women's Foundation. She received Share Our Strength's “No Kid Hungry” Hero Award and New York City's Special Merit in Public Health Award for her initiatives promoting access to healthy foods in low-income communities. She has received the Lincoln Center Distinguished Service Award. She received an honorary doctorate from Yeshiva University. In 2022, Tisch helped produce A Strange Loop, which won the Tony Award for Best Musical.

On March 11, 2026, Tisch and her brothers Steve and Jonathan asked the NFL to allow them to transfer their Giants ownership stakes to their children's trusts; the move followed the revelation that Steve had exchanged scores of emails with Jeffrey Epstein.

== Net worth ==
Forbes' list of The World's Billionaires said she had a net worth of $1.2 billion in April 2023.

== Personal life ==
She is divorced from Connecticut hedge fund manager Donald Sussman; they have two children, including Carolyn Tisch Blodgett, who ran marketing at Peloton, and Emily Tisch Sussman, a Democratic strategist, political commentator, and campaign coordinator who has run progressive campaigns for organizations such as the Center for American Progress and Swing Left.
