= SevenRooms =

American booking management software company

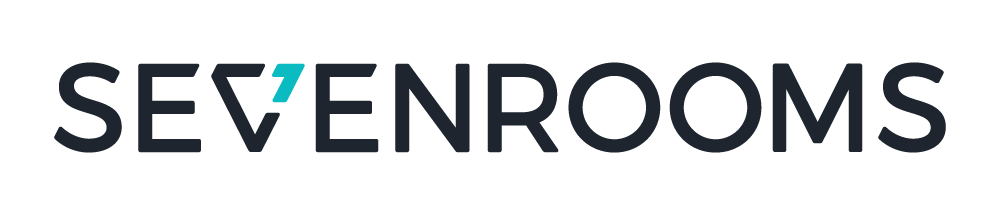
- Company type: Private
- Industry: Hospitality
- Founded: 2011; 14 years ago
- Founders: Joel Montaniel; Allison Page; Kinesh Patel
- Headquarters: New York, United States
- Key people: Joel Montaniel (CEO)
- Products: Hospitality technology
- Owner: DoorDash (2025-present)
- Website: www.sevenrooms.com

SevenRooms is a New York City-based restaurant technology company. It develops a cloud-based data platform used by restaurants, hotels, and other venues to take reservations, manage bookings, and collect guest information.

== History and timeline ==
SevenRooms was founded in 2011 by Joel Montaniel, Allison Page, and Kinesh Patel.

Its name was reportedly inspired by Vanity Fair editor Graydon Carter's seven rooms theory, considered a metaphor for undiscovered places. Montaniel became CEO, Page became the company's chief product officer, and Patel became chief technology officer.

Early backers included investment fund BoxGroup, restaurateur Thomas Keller, and the family behind the Nathan's Famous hot dog chain. In December 2017, it announced its first institutional funding round and $8M fundraise led by Comcast Ventures.

On March 21, 2018, the firm announced a partnership with Tripadvisor, that enables all non-U.S.-based hospitality operators to accept reservations via TripAdvisor. In May, it partnered with private event management company Tripleseat to integrate private event data with SevenRooms' platform.

In October 2018, six months after introducing its Instagram integration to use their 'Reserve' action button, it integrated with Google to offer restaurant reservations via Google Search, Maps and Assistant. Also in October, the company received investment from Amazon's Alexa Fund, becoming the first restaurant reservations company to receive investment from the fund.

In March 2019, The Wall Street Journal reported on the challenge SevenRooms faced trying to integrate its system with that of the table-booking service OpenTable. In June 2020, the firm raised $50 million in a series B at an undisclosed valuation, led by Providence Strategic Group.

In November 2021, it partnered with the London department store Harrods to deploy its software at 14 Harrods food and beverage outlets. In 2022, the company received press coverage for its "Fresh Start" policy of giving new hires two weeks of paid vacation before they start, while also mandating that every employee take five consecutive days of vacation twice per year.

In May 2025, it announced an agreement to be acquired by DoorDash for $1.2 billion in cash. The transaction closed on June 13, 2025.

== Services ==
SevenRooms' hospitality technology platform is used by restaurants, hotels, and other venues to "take online reservations, manage bookings, and gather guest feedback from guests about their visits". The profiles store data such as diner preferences and amount spent, to help the businesses customize customer service for future visits. Its platform integrates with restaurants' existing point of sale systems.

The company also issues research reports about third-party and direct booking online reservation systems, to help hospitality businesses improve the guest experience.
