= Jessica Tisch =

American heiress and public servant (born 1981)

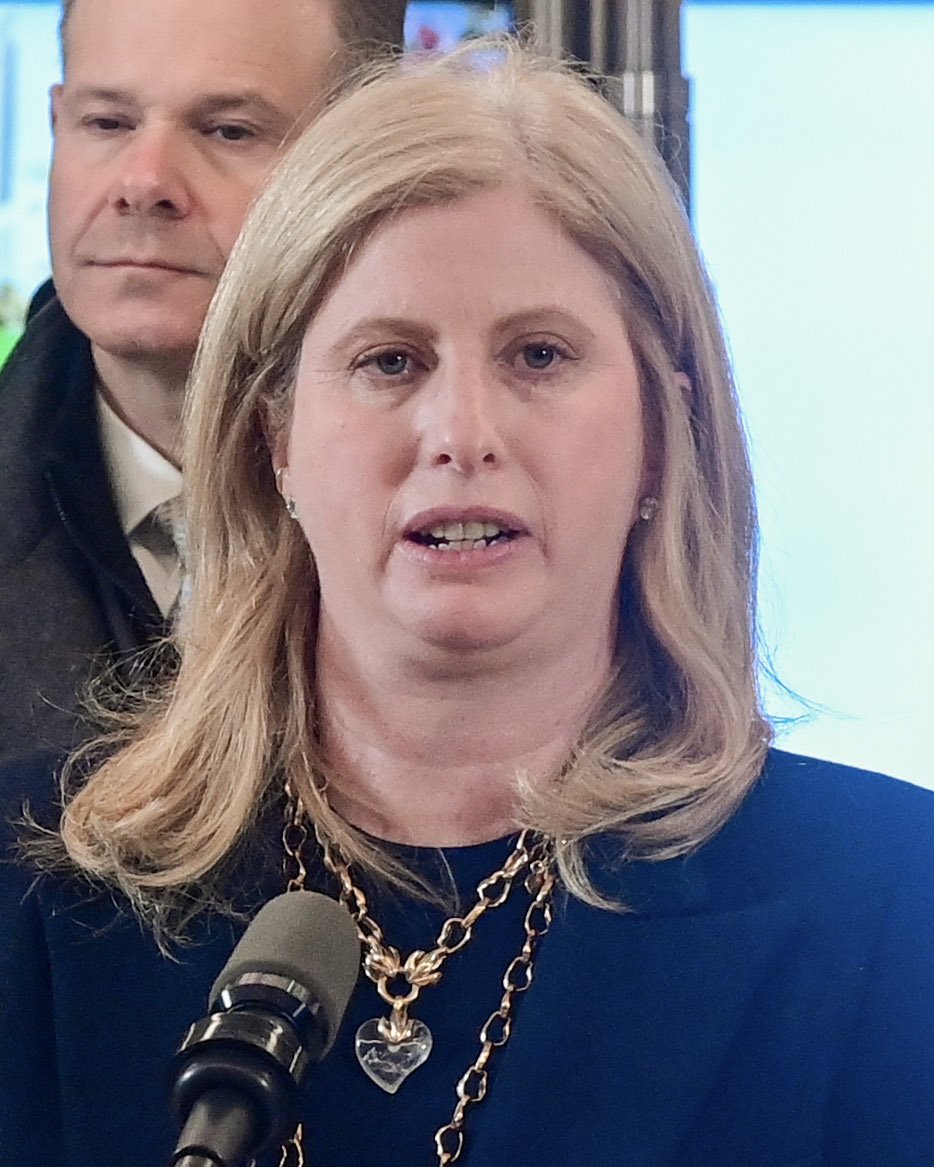
- Tisch in 2025

48th New York City Police Commissioner
- Incumbent
- Assumed office November 25, 2024
- Mayor: Eric Adams; Zohran Mamdani
- First Deputy: Tania Kinsella (2024–present)
- Preceded by: Thomas G. Donlon

Commissioner of the New York City Department of Sanitation
- In office April 18, 2022 – November 25, 2024
- Mayor: Eric Adams
- Preceded by: Ed Grayson
- Succeeded by: Javier Lojan (acting)

Commissioner of the New York City Department of Information Technology and Telecommunications
- In office December 5, 2019 – January 5, 2022
- Mayor: Bill de Blasio
- Preceded by: Samir Saini
- Succeeded by: Matt Fraser

Deputy Commissioner for Information Technology of the NYPD
- In office February 12, 2014 – December 5, 2019
- Mayor: Bill de Blasio
- Commissioner: Bill Bratton
- Preceded by: James Onalfo
- Succeeded by: Richard Esposito

Personal details
- Born: Jessica Sarah Tisch; February 21, 1981 (age 45)
- Party: Democratic
- Spouse: Daniel Levine
- Children: 2
- Parents: James Tisch; Merryl Tisch
- Education: Harvard University (BA, JD, MBA)
- Website: Office website

Jessica Sarah Tisch (/tɪʃ/ TISH; born February 21, 1981) is an American public administrator and commissioner. Since November 2024, she has served as the 48th New York City police commissioner. Previously, she served as Commissioner of the New York City Department of Sanitation from 2022 to 2024, as Commissioner of the New York City Department of Information Technology and Telecommunications from 2019 to 2022, and as Deputy Commissioner for Information Technology at the New York City Police Department from 2014 to 2019.

== Early life and education ==
Tisch was born to Merryl Tisch and James Tisch, chief executive officer of Loews Corporation. She received a Bachelor of Arts in 2003 from Harvard University. In 2008, she also received joint Master of Business Administration and Juris Doctor degrees from Harvard. In 2008, Tisch began her career with the counterterrorism bureau at the New York City Police Department, facilitated by commissioner Raymond Kelly. She went on to hold several civilian positions within the agency. In February 2014, she was appointed Deputy Commissioner for Information Technology at the city police department.

== Career ==
In November 2019, Tisch was appointed by mayor Bill de Blasio to serve as the Commissioner for New York City Department of Information Technology and Telecommunication. On April 18, 2022, Tisch was appointed by mayor Eric Adams Commissioner of the New York City Department of Sanitation. On November 20, 2024, she was named the Commissioner of the New York Police Department. Despite having never served as a police officer, Tisch was sworn in as NYPD Commissioner on Monday, November 25, 2024.

== Personal life ==
In 2006, Tisch married Daniel Zachary Levine in a ceremony that was officiated by her maternal grandfather, Rabbi Philip Hiat, at Central Synagogue in Manhattan. They have two sons. She is a member of the prominent Tisch family, which owns roughly one-third of Loews Corporation, and is one of its heirs. Her relatives include Jonathan, Laurie, Wilma and Steve Tisch. In 2024, Forbes estimated the family’s net worth at approximately US$10.1 billion.

In January 2026, Tisch affixed a mezuzah to the entrance of her office at One Police Plaza and recited the accompanying blessing in the presence of Jewish members of the department.

Police appointments
Preceded by Thomas G. Donlon	New York City Police Commissioner; November 25, 2024–present	Incumbent
