= Elizabeth Wyatt =

Elizabeth Wyatt may refer to:

- Elizabeth, Lady Wyatt (1503 – 1560), rumoured candidate for Henry VIII's sixth wife; wife of poet, Thomas Wyatt; mother of rebel Thomas Wyatt the Younger

== See also ==
- Elizabeth Wiatt, businesswoman
