= Eleven James =

Subscription watch company

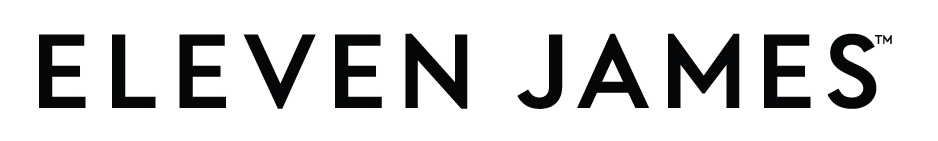
- Industry: Retail
- Founded: New York, New York, 2013
- Headquarters: New York, New York, U.S.
- Area served: United States
- Key people: Olivier Reza - CEO
- Products: Watches
- Website: www.elevenjames.com

Eleven James was an online subscription rental service for luxury watches. It was founded in 2013 in New York City and offers both men's and women's timepieces.

The service shutdown in August 2018 due to a lack of investments.

Eleven James offered vintage watch styles as well as popular luxury brands including Rolex, Patek Philippe, Audemars Piguet, Breitling and more. Eleven James was often referred to as the "Netflix of watches" due to their subscription model which operated much like the disc rental plans from Netflix.

== History ==
Eleven James was founded in 2013 by Randy Brandoff, former NetJets CMO. Brandoff also helped to launch Tequila Avion, a spirits brand made popular by the HBO series “Entourage,” where he was a co-founder and principal prior to the company's sale to Pernod Ricard in 2014.

Since launching Eleven James in 2014, the company raised $6.72 million in a Series A investment. As of January 2017, Eleven James raised $30 million of additional capital. To date, Eleven James has secured $38.12 million in funding from both private investors and corporations including BoxGroup, Kenny Dichter, and Jason Saltzman.
