= Tish (disambiguation) =

Tish is a feminine given name and nickname, and an uncommon surname.

Tish may also refer to:

- Tish (Hasidic celebration), a Hasidic gathering of Hassidim around their Rebbe
- Tish (film), a 1942 American film
- TISH, a Canadian poetry newsletter
