= Tisha =

Tisha or Tishah is the Hebrew word for the number nine, as in Tisha B'Av (= 9th of the month Av), an annual fasting day in Judaism.

Tisha is a given name and surname. It is also a diminutive of the Russian masculine name Тихон (Tikhon). Notable persons with that name include:

== People with the given name ==
- Tisha Abundo (born 1949), Philippine sports commissioner
- Tisha Campbell-Martin (born 1968), American actress and singer
- Tisha Martin (21st century), British actress and singer
- Tisha Sterling (born 1944), American actress
- Tisha Terrasini Banker (born 1973), American actress

== Mononymous person ==
- Nusrat Imrose Tisha, Bangladeshi actress and model

== See also ==
- Tish
- Trisha
- Letitia
- "Toilet Tisha", a song from the OutKast album Stankonia
