= James Tisch =

American businessman (born 1953)

- Born: James S. Tisch; January 2, 1953 (age 73); Atlantic City, New Jersey, US
- Education: Cornell University (BA); University of Pennsylvania (MBA)
- Occupation: businessman
- Known for: CEO of Loews Corporation
- Spouse: Merryl H. Tisch
- Children: 3, including Jessica Tisch
- Parent(s): Wilma "Billie" Stein; Laurence Tisch
- Family: Andrew Tisch (brother) Jessica Tisch (daughter)

James S. Tisch (born January 2, 1953) is an American businessman who has been the CEO of Loews Corporation since 1999.

== Early life and education ==
He was born in 1953 in Atlantic City, New Jersey to Wilma "Billie" Stein and Laurence Tisch. His father was co-chairman of Loews Corporation along with his uncle Preston Robert Tisch.

In 1971, Tisch graduated from Suffield Academy in Suffield, Connecticut. He went on to earn a B.A. from Cornell University and an M.B.A. at the Wharton School of the University of Pennsylvania.

== Career ==
Tisch's other positions include a seat in the board of the Federal Reserve Bank of New York, the chairmanship of WNET, membership in the Council on Foreign Relations, and seats on the boards of General Electric, Mount Sinai Hospital, New York, and the New York Public Library. Tisch was an investor, alongside Mark Penn, Victor Ganzi, Josh Harris, and Thomas Peterffy, in The Messenger, a news website that launched in May 2023.

== Personal life ==
Tisch is married to Merryl (née Hiat) Tisch. She is a former member of the New York State Board of Regents and the chairwoman of the board of the Metropolitan Council on Jewish Poverty. They have three children, including Jessica Tisch.

Tisch and his wife Merryl donated $40 million to establish The Tisch Cancer Institute, a cancer care and research facility at the Mount Sinai Hospital, New York. Tisch was a supporter of Rudolph Giuliani and has donated to the Republican party. He also supported Joe Lhota for New York City mayor in 2013.
