= Chocolates on the Pillow Aren't Enough =

2007 book by Jonathan M. Tisch with Karl Weber

Chocolates on the Pillow Aren't Enough: Reinventing the Customer Experience
- Author: Jonathan M. Tisch with Karl Weber
- Language: English
- Genre: Customer Service
- Publisher: John Wiley & Sons
- Publication date: 2007
- Pages: 272
- ISBN: 978-0-470-04355-4
- OCLC: 76064574
- Dewey Decimal: 647.94/068 22
- LC Class: TX911.3.C8 T57 2007

Chocolates on the Pillow Aren't Enough: Reinventing the Customer Experience is a 2007 book on customer service co-written by billionaire hotelier Jonathan Tisch and Karl Weber.

It was the second book by Tisch, who was then the chairman and CEO of Loews Hotels. It talks about the relations between customer service and business success, using companies such as In-N-Out Burger, Commerce Bank, Urban Outfitters as case studies. Among its themes are using technology to create intimate connections with customers, expanding a company's offerings beyond their basic product or service, recognizing customers' needs for physical and psychological safety, the "art of the welcome" in physical and virtual spaces, and balancing the growing demand for transparency with realistic needs for security and confidentiality.

The book received coverage on CNBC's "Power Lunch," ESPN's "Cold Pizza," and PBS's "Nightly Business Report." Tisch was a guest on NBC's The Today Show on March 2, 2007, and on CBS's Early Show on March 7, 2007, where he discussed the Build-A-Bear company.
