= BoxGroup =

American investment fund company

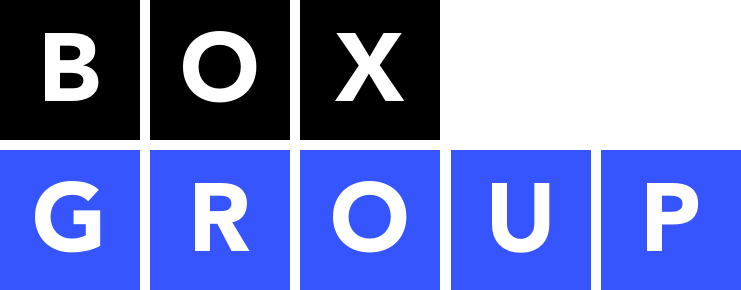
- Type: Privately held company
- Industry: Venture capital and private equity
- Founded: 2007 in New York City, United States
- Headquarters: New York City, United States
- Area served: United States and Europe
- Key people: David Tisch (Co-founder and managing director); Adam Rothenberg (Co-founder and partner)
- Services: Seed funding
- Website: boxgroup.com

BoxGroup is an investment fund company based in New York City. It was founded in 2007 by David Tisch.

== Company History ==
BoxGroup was founded in 2007 by David Tisch, grandson of entrepreneur Laurence A. Tisch, and Adam Rothenberg.

BoxGroup invests in the pre-seed and seed rounds of financing for early-stage companies. One of the financing companies they have invested in is Ramp (company), a corporate card start-up. The venture capital fund invests in start-up technology businesses in many sectors, including marketplaces, e-commerce, SAAS, and financial tech.

In October 2019, BoxGroup closed two external LP-backed funds totaling $165 million.

BoxGroup was among the top three most active United States–based micro venture capital firms in 2014.

In 2025, BoxGroup raised $550 million across two new funds.

=== Investments ===
The company has more than 230 investments in startup companies, including Ramp, Vine, Ro, Cursor, Clay, Zipline, Groupme, Warby Parker, and Scopely.
