= David Tisch =

American businessman and angel investor

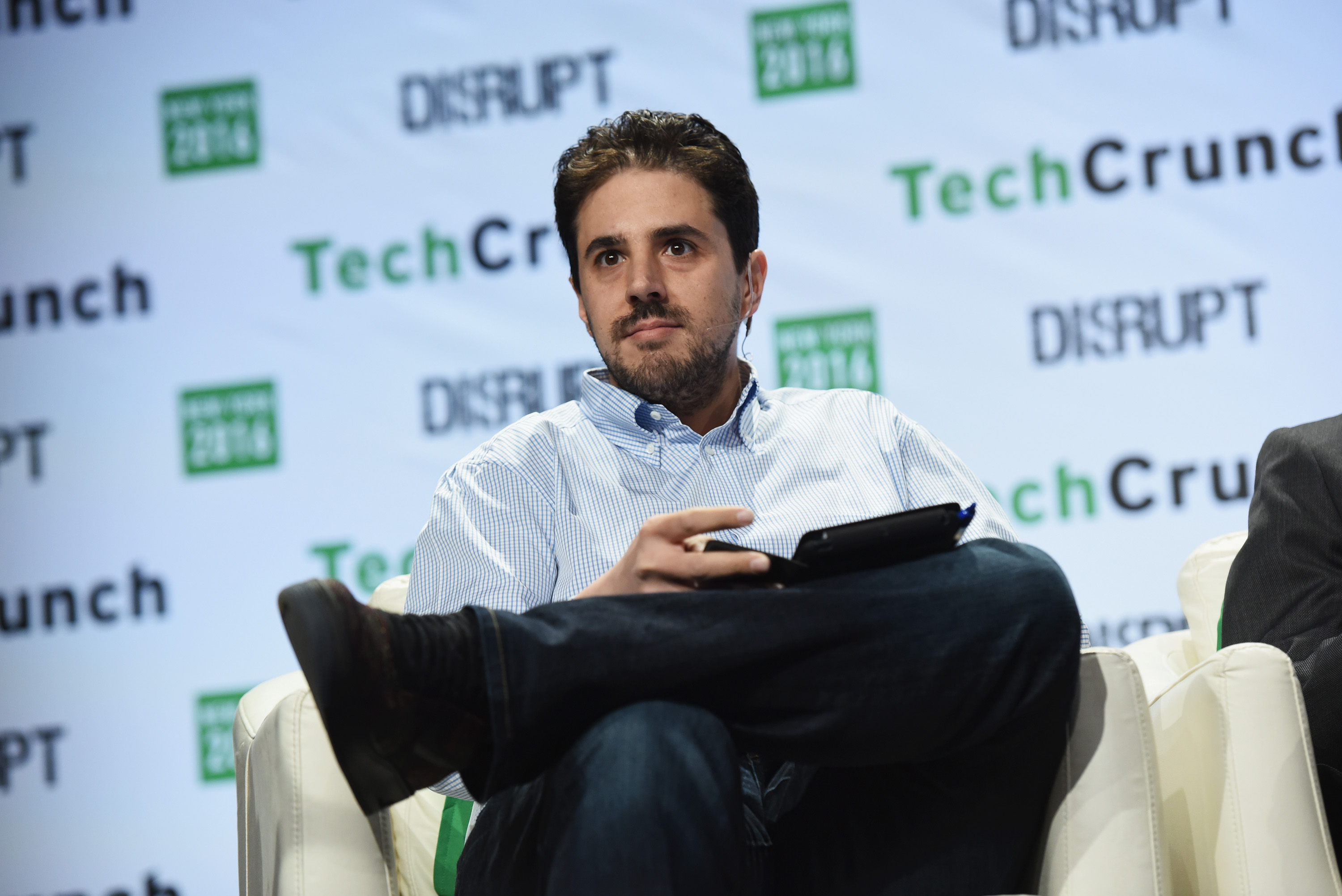
- Born: June 17, 1981 (age 45); Westchester, New York, United States
- Education: University of Pennsylvania, New York University School of Law
- Occupations: Business owner, entrepreneur, angel investor
- Years active: 2003 to present
- Spouse: Zara Terez Zimmerman
- Parent(s): Bonnie J. Tisch; Daniel R. Tisch
- Relatives: Laurence Tisch (grandfather); Preston Robert Tisch (great-uncle); Steve Tisch (cousin)

David Tisch (born 1981) is an American businessman and angel investor based in New York City. He is managing partner of BoxGroup, a seed-stage capital firm, and a co-founder of TechStars New York City.

He is the grandson of American businessman Laurence Tisch, co-owner of Loews Corporation. His great-uncle, Preston Robert Tisch purchased the New York Giants, now co-owned by Steve Tisch, who produced the films Forrest Gump and Risky Business.

== Education and early career ==
Tisch was born and raised outside of New York in Westchester County, the son of Bonnie J. Tisch and Daniel R. Tisch. His grandfather is Laurence A. Tisch. He is Jewish and invested his bar mitzvah money in the eBay IPO and saw a 15x return.

Tisch graduated from the University of Pennsylvania with a B.A degree in American history in 2003. He received a Juris Doctor degree from New York University in 2006.

Tisch practiced law and worked at Vornado Realty Trust. He helped found LightsOver, an online group-buying service. In 2006, Tisch stopped practicing law to work on his own startup.

== Career ==
Tisch began his career heading up interactive strategies at Knowledge Generation Bureau.

In 2007, Tisch founded BoxGroup, a technology investment firm that has invested in 250 companies including Vine, Warby Parker, Handy, and GroupMe. BoxGroup is personally funded making Tisch one of the most active angel investors in the United States.

Tisch co-founded the Techstars New York City program, a startup accelerator program, and became managing director in 2010. During his tenure, he helped lead some of the most successful investments in the history of Silicon Alley startups. Under his direction, companies in the program raised more than $100 million in follow-on capital. Tisch left TechStars in 2012.

Tisch became a member of Mayor Michael Bloomberg’s Council on Technology and Innovation in 2011.

In August 2014, Tisch co-founded Spring, a mobile marketplace allowing consumers to shop directly from brands. Investors include BoxGroup, Google Ventures, and Yuri Milner. Apple listed Spring as one of the best apps for 2014.

Tisch was named head of Cornell Tech's Startup Studio program in December 2014. Startup Studio is an experiential learning graduate program that teams students from different disciplines to develop an idea into a product.

== Personal life ==
In 2012, he married Zara Terez Zimmerman.
