= LMR Partners =

British hedge fund

LMR Partners LLP
- Type: Private
- Industry: Investment management
- Founded: November 2009; 16 years ago
- Founders: Ben Levine; Andrew Manuel; Stefan Renold
- Headquarters: London, United Kingdom
- Products: Hedge funds Alternative investments
- AUM: US$11 billion (2024)
- Number of employees: 300 (2024)
- Website: www.lmrpartners.com

LMR Partners (LMR) is a British multi-strategy investment firm. It has a focus on global macro and event-driven investment strategies and makes use of both systematic and discretionary trading strategies.

The firm is headquartered in London with an additional offices in Hong Kong, New York, Zurich, Dubai and Glasgow.

== Background ==
In November 2009, LMR was founded by Ben Levine, Andrew Manuel and Stefan Renold with the firm's name coming after the first letter of their surnames. The three of them were previously traders who worked at UBS and Goldman Sachs. Donald Sussman's Paloma Partners provided seed money for LMR to manage.

The firm started trading in February 2010. In 2010 and 2011, LMR had a return of 30% and 38% respectively while the average hedge fund return was 10.25% and -5.25% in the same timeframe.

In August 2012, LMR expanded its business operations into Asia by opening an office in Hong Kong with Renold running it.

It was reported that LMR's profits in 2013 dropped by 54% compared to the previous year.

In 2015, Manuel left LMR to start his own global macro hedge fund, Ixworth Capital.

In February 2017, it was reported that Giacomo Draghi, son of then-President of the European Central Bank (and later Prime Minister of Italy) Mario Draghi, had left his job as a trader at Morgan Stanley to join LMR as a portfolio manager.

In September 2018, Petershill Partners acquired a minority stake of LMR for an undisclosed sum. In September 2024, Petershill Partners sold its stake in LMR for up for $258 million.

According to Bloomberg News, from 2010 to the start of 2020, LMR had never experienced an overall loss over a 12-month period. For 119 months since its establishment, it had posted losses in only 19 of them making it one of the world's most steady hedge funds. However, in March 2020, LMR reported a loss of 12.5% due to market conditions being affected by the COVID-19 pandemic. One of the main factors were basis trades which was the primary method that LMR made money and was by far its biggest wager. LMR had to reduce its investments and trading activities while asking its investors to inject more capital into its funds.

In November 2022, LMR opened an office in Dubai following the trend of other hedge funds.

In June 2023, LMR and Kyma Capital sued Anchorage Capital Group and PJT Partners. They were all creditors of healthcare provider, Orpea and Anchorage and PJT Partners were working with its steering committee to restructure the company's debt. LMR and Kyma Capital claimed the restructuring deal benefits the steering committee at the expense of the other creditors.

In May 2024, LMR added Oil to its investment strategy as part of the push to expand in commodities trading.
