= Joan Tisch =

American billionaire and philanthropist (1927-2017)

- Born: Joan Hyman; July 14, 1927; Manhattan, New York, U.S.
- Died: November 2, 2017 (aged 90); Manhattan, New York, U.S.
- Education: B.A. University of Michigan
- Occupations: Investor, Philanthropist
- Spouse: Preston Robert Tisch
- Children: Steve Tisch; Jonathan Tisch; Laurie Tisch

Joan Tisch (née Hyman; July 14, 1927 – November 2, 2017) was an American philanthropist. She was a graduate of the University of Michigan and billionaire heir to the Tisch family fortune (through the Loews Corporation, which remains under family control).

== Personal life ==
Tisch was born to Howard N. Hyman and his wife, Marie Ziegler. Her father was a Manhattan dentist who helped disabled war veterans attend theater and sporting events. He persuaded Jack Mara, then president of the New York Giants, to donate 400 seats for each home game to disabled fans and their companions, according to a news release from Loews upon his death in 1981. Her mother was born in Germany. In 1948, she received a bachelor's degree in English from the University of Michigan and married Preston Robert "Bob" Tisch (1926–2005) the same year. They had three children: Steve Tisch, Jonathan Tisch, and Laurie Tisch.

Joan Tisch died on the morning of November 2, 2017, at the age of 90 after a brief illness.
