= Merryl Tisch =

American educator

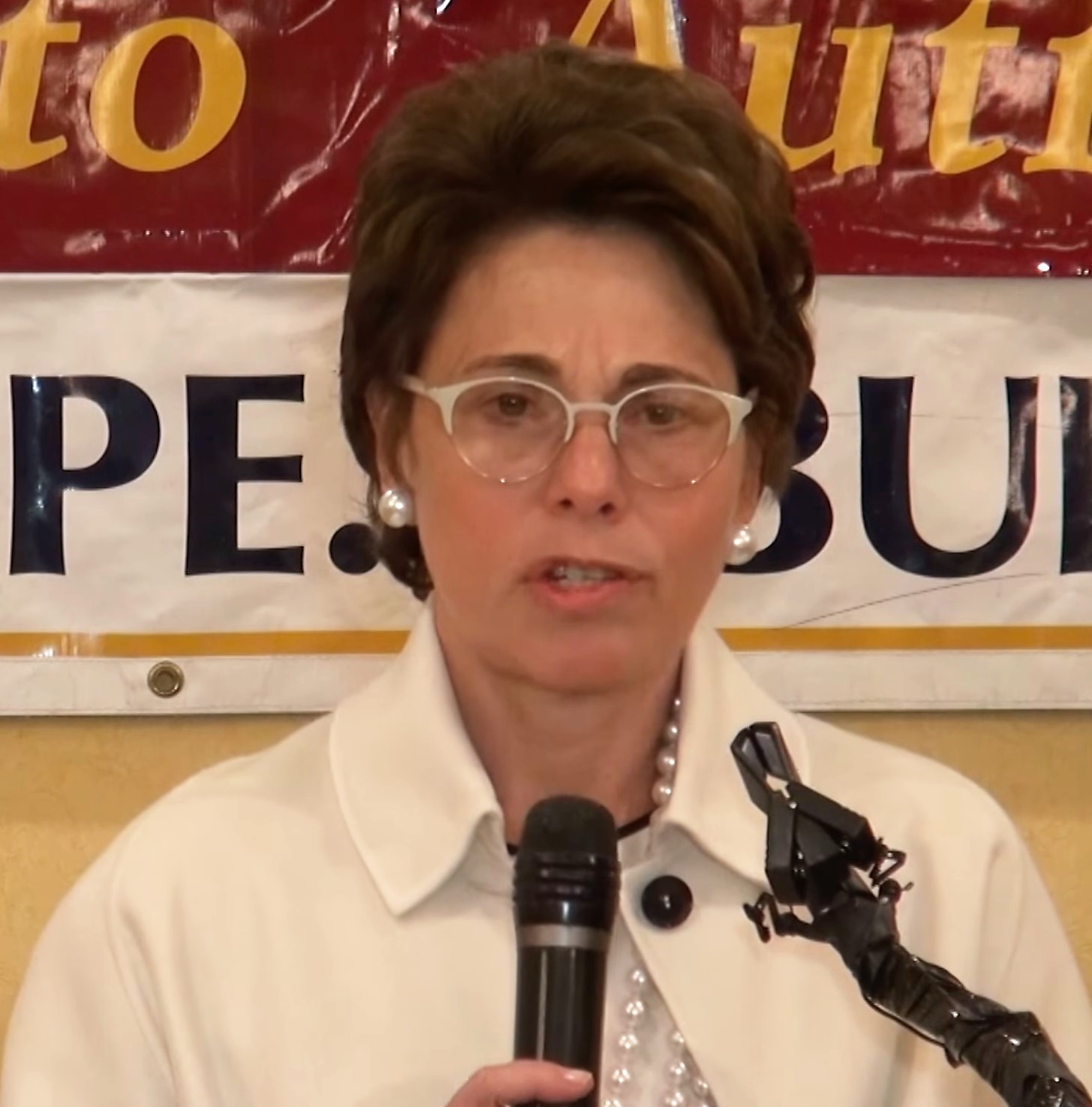
- Tisch speaks at the annual Shema Kolainu legislative breakfast in 2015
- Born: Merryl Hiat; 1955 (age 70–71)
- Education: Barnard College (BA); New York University (MA); Columbia University (EdD)
- Occupations: Schoolteacher; Educational Administrator
- Known for: Chairman, State University of New York Board of Trustees; Former Chancellor of the New York State Board of Regents
- Spouse: James S. Tisch
- Children: Jessica, Benjamin, and Samuel
- Parent: Philip Hiat

Merryl H. Tisch (born c. 1955) is currently the Chairman of the Board of Trustees for the State University of New York (SUNY). She is the former Chancellor of the New York State Board of Regents and served as a member of the Board of Regents from 1996 to 2015.

== Biography ==
Tisch was born Merryl Hiat to Rabbi Philip Hiat. Merryl's sister, Susan Hiat, married (since divorced) to James's brother, Andrew Tisch in 1972. She received a Bachelor of Arts from Barnard College in 1976, a Master of Arts from New York University and a Doctor of Education (EdD) from Teachers College, Columbia University in 2005. Her doctoral dissertation explored new teacher residency programs at Mercy University.

She taught first graders at the Ramaz School on the Upper East Side of Manhattan and at the B'nai Jeshurun School from 1977 to 1984.

Tisch has served in various civic service positions, including at The Washington Institute for Near East Policy, the UJA-Federation of New York, the Leadership Enterprise for a Diverse America, the United States Holocaust Memorial Museum, and the Citizens Budget Commission. Tisch is the chairperson of the Metropolitan Council on Jewish Poverty. Tisch is on the Board of the Dalton School on the Upper East Side and Barnard College.

=== New York State Board of Regents ===
Tisch served as a member of the New York State Board of Regents from 1996 to 2015, and was Chancellor of the Board from 2009 to 2016.

She said that budget restraints left the Board in May 2011 with no choice other than to cancel January Regents tests. At the end of May 2011, principals affiliated with the New Visions for Public Schools signed a letter of complaint directed to Tisch and the Board, arguing that the elimination of the tests would lead to a higher dropout rate and would cost the state money.

She has criticized Pearson PLC, the education text and test publisher, recently questioning its ability to handle its growing workload. "Obviously, the public is starting to question, I think, very aggressively with us whether or not they're able to manage all of the things they've taken on."

Following a 2013 protest rally at Albany by the New York State United Teachers, she acknowledged that New York State would hold off on a plan to raise the percentage by which test scores would count in a teacher's evaluation from 20 percent to 25 percent. A provision in the state's evaluation law, passed in 2010, allows for the increase if officials adopt a more complex "value-added" model to measure student growth.

She faced organized opposition when she returned on May 21, 2013 to her alma mater, Teachers College, for an award. Education professor and activist Diane Ravitch dubbed her "the Doyenne of high-stakes testing.

=== State University of New York ===
Tisch was appointed Chair of the State University of New York Board of Trustees in September 2019.

== Political involvements ==
In April 2004, Tisch considered running for the Upper East Side City Council seat then held by term-limited council member Eva Moskowitz. She was also floated as a possible mayoral candidate in 2013. In April 2013, Tisch announced that she would become chairwoman of the campaign of former New York City comptroller Democrat Bill Thompson. Among her activities in the Thompson campaign, she hosted the June 12 Women for Thompson event, at which major attendees were Randi Weingarten, Hazel Dukes and Kauturia D'Amato, wife of former Republican U.S. Senator Alphonse D'Amato. The New York Post criticized her concurrent work on the Board of Regents and her leading role in the Thompson campaign as "moonlighting."

Tisch's husband James was an active supporter of Joe Lhota, the Republican front-runner in the 2013 New York City mayoral election.

== Personal life ==
Tisch is married to James Tisch, the heir to the Loews Corporation. They have three children including Jessica Tisch.
