= Micro venture capital =

Micro venture capital is money invested to seed early-stage emerging companies with amounts of finance that is typically less than that of traditional venture capital. In contrast to traditional venture capital which is money used to invest in companies looking to fund growth (also referred to as a Series A round of funding), micro venture capital consists of smaller seed investments, typically between $25K to $500K, in companies that have yet to gain traction. In the United States, the number of micro venture capital firms have continued to rise rapidly over the last 5 years, and have become an important source of finance for startup companies.

== Principles ==
Micro venture capital generally share certain characteristics:

- Initial investment at the seed stage
- Investment on behalf of 3rd party Limited Partners
- Most commonly have fund sizes that are less than $50MM

Most micro venture capital firms pursue startups that are at their seed stage because of their lower initial cost basis. Though there is a high probability that the majority of these startups will not survive long enough to reach a Series A round of funding, micro venture capital firms are willing to make the investment because startups generally do not require large sums of capital to bring a product to market, and because they believe that it requires only a few successful companies for them to see profitable returns.

== Examples ==
In the United States, there are over 236 micro venture capital firms, with more than half located in Silicon Valley. Notable examples include SV Angel, which had invested in Dropbox (a file hosting service valued at $10 billion as of January 2014), and Lowercase Capital which had invested in Uber.

== See also ==
- Venture capital
- Microfinance
- Microcredit
- Microloan
