= Gyaldem Tish =

Ghanaian musician

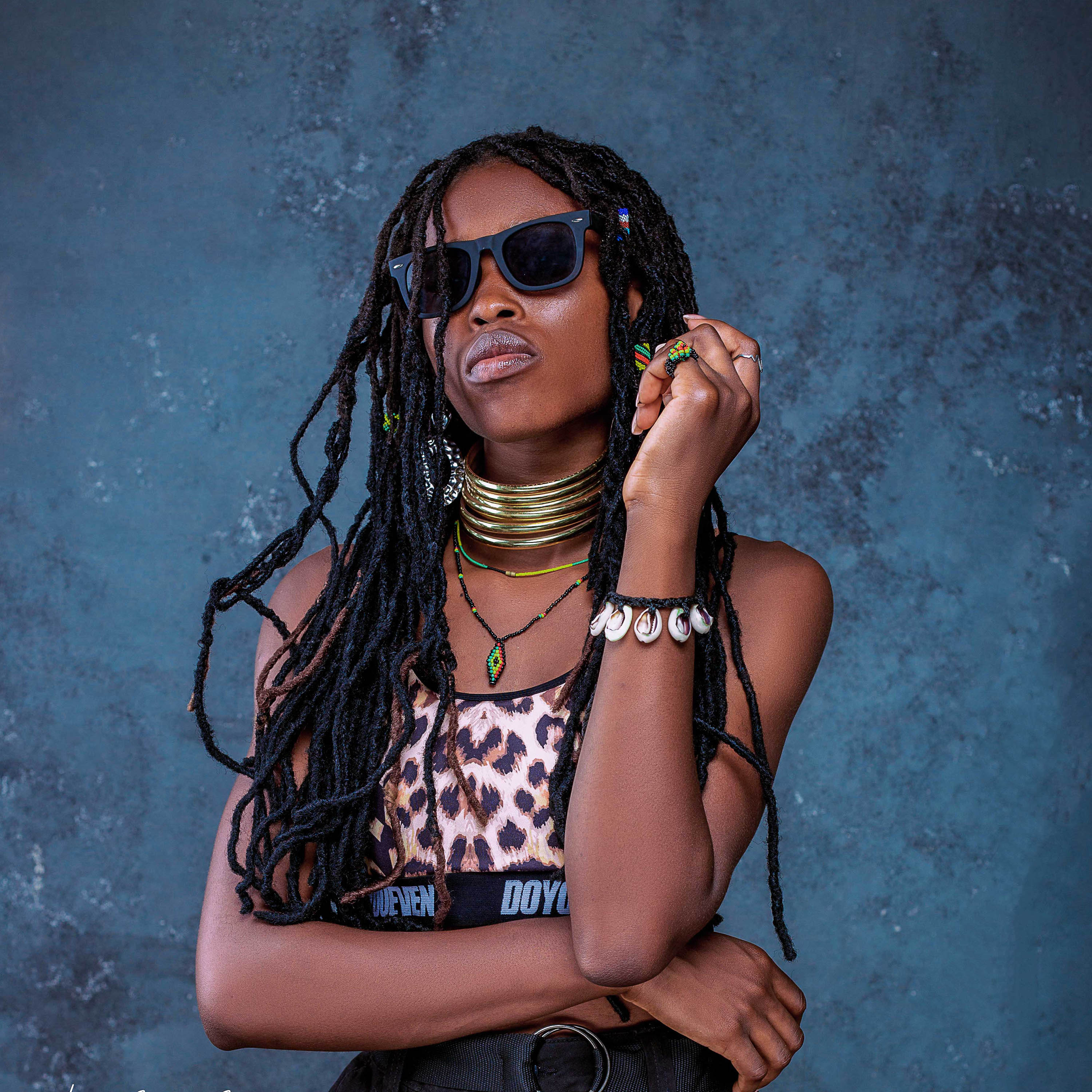

Background information
- Also known as: Gyaldem Tish
- Born: Opare Leticia; Donkorkrom, Ghana
- Genres: Dancehall; Afrobeats
- Occupation: Singer
- Years active: 2017–present
- Label: DPM Records

Opare Leticia, known by her stage name Gyaldem Tish, is a Ghanaian Afropop, dancehall and reggae singer.

== Early life and career ==
Gyaldem Tish was born to Mr & Mrs Opare in Donkorkrom, Kwahu Afram Plains North in the Eastern Region of Ghana. After Junior High School, she moved to Mpraeso to further her Education in Secondary Level. Her passion for music developed when she was in High school.

She released her first official single in 2018 titled "UnderTaker" which gained her some recognition in the country. She released "iWoman" shortly after. She also joined some bands to perform some of the nation's most popular songs.

== Discography ==
=== Singles ===
- "UnderTaker"
- "iWoman"
- "Suffer Get" ft Dhat Gyal
- "Nuh Care" ft Quame Rhymz
- "Fear No Man"
- "Your Grace"
- "Broken"
- "Whine Fi Me" ft Elly Element
- "Hostage"

=== Albums/ EPs ===
- iWoman (EP)

== Awards and nominations ==
Year	Event	Prize	Recipient	Result	Ref
2019	Emerging Music Awards	Dancehall Artist of the Year	Herself	Nominated	
2019	Emerging Music Awards	Dancehall Song of the Year	iWoman	Nominated	
2019	Eastern Music Awards	Female Vocalist of the Year	Herself	Nominated	
2019	Eastern Music Awards	Most Promising Act of the Year	Herself	Nominated	
2019	Eastern Music Awards	Reggae Dancehall Song of the Year	iWoman	Won	
2019	Eastern Music Awards	Reaggae Dancehall Artist of the Year	Herself	Nominated	
2020	Emerging Music Awards	Dancehall Artist of the Year	Herself	Nominated	
2020	Emerging Music Awards	Dancehall Song of the Year	Fear No Man	Nominated	
2020	Eastern Music Awards	Reggae Dancehall Act of the Year	Herself	Nominated	
2020	Eastern Music Awards	Reggae Dancehall Song of the Year	Fear No Man	Won	
2020	Youth Empowerment Awards	Youth Reggae/Dancehall artist of the Year	Herself	Nominated	
2021	Ghana Merit Awards	Next Rated Female Act	Herself	Nominated	
2021	Kwahu Music Awards	Reggae Dancehall Artist of the Year	Herself	Nominated	
2021	Kwahu Music Awards	Reggae Dancehall Song of the Year	Fear No Man	Won	
2021	Kwahu Music Awards	Best Vocalist of the Year	Herself	Nominated	
2021	Emerging Music Awards	Reggae Song Of the Year	Your Grace	Nominated	
2021	Eastern Music Awards	Female Vocalist of the Year	Herself	Nominated	
2021	Eastern Music Awards	Raggae/Dancehall Song of the Year	Whine Fi Me	Nominated	
2021	Eastern Music Awards	Reggae/Dancehall Artist of the Year	Herself	Nominated	

== Videography ==
Year	Title	Director	Ref
2019	iWoman	Redshots Images	
2019	Suffer Get ft Dhat Gyal	DPM FiLMS	
2019	Gyaldem Tish Performing at Vac With DJ Mensah	DPM FiLMS	
2019	Gyaldem Tish Performing at Eastern Music Awards	NK PROMO GH	
2020	My Own(Cover) ft Samini	DPM FiLMS	
2020	Caution	DPM FiLMS	
2020	Fear No Man	DPM FiLMS	
2020	Your Grace	DPM FiLMS	
