= Elizabeth Wiatt =

American businessperson

- Born: Elizabeth Rieger; 1967 (age 58–59)
- Occupation: businesswoman
- Known for: co-founder of Fashionology LA
- Spouse: Jim Wiatt
- Children: two

Elizabeth Wiatt is an American businesswoman, co-founder of Fashionology LA (with Jamie Tisch), a retailer based in Beverly Hills, California.

== Biography ==
Born Elizabeth Rieger, Wiatt was born and raised in Manhattan and attended Barnard College. After school she worked as a staffer for Vogue Magazine and then as a talent agent at ICM Partners where her future husband, James Wiatt was president. She later co-founded Fashionology LA (with Jamie Tisch), a make-your-own-clothing shop that caters to young girls ages 8 to 12. Wiatt has served on the boards of the Natural Resources Defense Council. the Fulfillment Fund, the Directors Circle of Los Angeles County Museum, The Southern California Committee of Human Rights Watch, and the Desmond Tutu Peace Foundation. She is also on the steering committee of Antonio Villaraigosa's Million Trees LA initiative. Wiatt has lived in Los Angeles for fifteen years with her husband Jim Wiatt, CEO and Chairman of the William Morris Agency, and their two daughters. They divorced in 2011.
