= Tish Cohen =

Canadian author

- Born: Toronto, Canada
- Education: Ted Rogers School of Management (BA)
- Occupation: Author
- Writing career
- Period: 2007–present
- Website: tishcohen.com

Tish Cohen is a Canadian novelist.

== Early life ==
Born in Toronto, Cohen spent most of her childhood in Montreal, but spent her teenage years with her father beginning in the 7th grade at a high school in Orange County, California (The OC).

== Career ==
Tish Cohen finished her studies at the Ted Rogers School of Management of Toronto Metropolitan University in 1988. Before her writing career, Cohen worked as media buyer at an ad agency, art gallery manager, illustrator, proofreader, decorative painter and editor.

== Writing ==
Cohen is well known for her fast pace writing. Her children's book The Invisible Rules of the Zoë Lama became a bestseller in Canada in 2007. Her novel Town house was a 2008 finalist for the Commonwealth Writers Prize' Best First Book Award (Canada and Caribbean region). The right for making her novel Town House into a movie were bought by Ridley Scott's fim production company and optioned by Fox 2000 in 2005. It was also translated into German and Italien and published as Super Agoraphobietherapie in Germany at Luchterhand Literaturverlag in 2009. Kirkus Reviews attributed to the novel „a constellation of characters whose idiosyncrasies make the family of Little Miss Sunshine look like Ozzie and Harriet.".Publishers Weekly criticized the plot as "formulaic", but also described the novel as "terrifically written".The Globe and Mail reviewed the novel as follows: "There's more than quirky charm and endearing oddness in the characters Cohen creates." It compared it with Alexander McCall Smith's 44 Scotland Street: "Cohen's Lucie a North American near-relative of McCall Smith's Bertie" and praised this as an "incredible achievement in itself". The Toronto Star recommend the novel as one of four current canlit books for hot summer and described it as "Comic novel about an agoraphobe whose life begins to unravel."

The novel Inside Out Girl was a Globe and Mail bestseller in 2009. Allison Burnett signed an agreement to adapt the novel Inside Out Girl into a movie in August 2009.

The novel The Truth About Delilah Blue, which deals with a young woman with an old father with Alzheimer's disease and an absent mother, was recommended as one of 10 summer reads by Vit Wagner of Toronto Star in 2010. Cynthia MacDonald reviewed this novel for The Globe and Mail in June 2010 and considered it as "the summer's first terrific beach read".

For Tish Cohen's novel "The Search Angel", whose topic is adoption, the National Post attributed a "story telling talent" to the author in June 2013.

Cohen and Barbara Fogler wrote the screenplay for Sheila McCarthys short film Russet Season which premiered at Toronto Jewish Film Festival in 2017.

== Personal life ==
Cohen is married to a lawyer and has two children.

== Bibliography ==
=== Novels ===
- 2007: Town House, Harper Perennial, New York, ISBN 9780061131318
  - 2009: Tish Cohen: Super Agoraphobietherapie, 2009, Luchterhand-Literaturverlag, ISBN 978-3-630-62145-6 (translated into German by Martin Ruben Becker)
- 2008: Inside Out Girl, Harper Perennial, New York, ISBN 9780061452956
- 2010: The Truth About Delilah Blue, Harper Perennial, New York, ISBN 9780061875977
- 2013: The Search Angel, HarperCollins, New York, ISBN 978-1443410823
- 2019: The Summer We Lost Her aka Little Green, Gallery Books, New York, ISBN 9781501199684

=== Children's books ===
- 2007: The Invisible Rules of the Zoë Lama, Dutton Children's Books, ISBN 9780525478102
- 2008: The One and Only Zoë Lama, Dutton Children's Books, ISBN 9780525478911
- 2009: Little Black Lies, Egmont, New York, ISBN 9781606840337
- 2011: Switch, Egmont, New York, ISBN 9781606841303
