= Laurence Tisch =

American billionaire businessman and investor (1923-2003)

- Born: Laurence Alan Tisch; March 5, 1923; New York City, New York, United States
- Died: November 15, 2003 (aged 80)
- Burial place: Westchester Hills Cemetery, New York, United States
- Education: New York University (BA); University of Pennsylvania (MBA)
- Occupation: businessman
- Known for: co-founder of the Loews Corporation
- Spouse: Wilma Stein (m. 1948)
- Children: Andrew, Daniel, James, and Thomas
- Parent(s): Sadye Brenner; Al Tisch

Laurence Alan Tisch (March 5, 1923 – November 15, 2003) was an American billionaire businessman and investor. He was the CEO of CBS television network from 1986 to 1995. With his brother Bob Tisch, he was part owner of Loews Corporation.

== Early life ==
Tisch was born March 5, 1923, in Brooklyn, New York, the son of Sadye (née Brenner) and Al Tisch. His father's parents had emigrated from Ukraine and his mother's parents from Poland. He was of Jewish descent. His father, a former All-American basketball player at the City University of New York, owned a garment factory as well as two summer camps which his wife helped him run.

== Education and early career ==
He graduated from New York University when he was just 18 and received a Penn Wharton MBA in industrial management by 20. In 1946, he made his first investment, purchasing a 300-room winter resort in Lakewood, New Jersey with $125,000 in seed money (roughly equivalent to $1.5 million at 2012 prices) from his parents and additional funds from a friend. The hotel, Laurel-in-the-Pines, was built in 1891, and was the second major hotel to open in the gilded age resort of Lakewood.

Two years later, his brother Bob joined him in the business, launching a lifelong partnership between the pair with Larry handling financial matters and Bob the overall management.

Their first hotel was successful and over the next decade, the Tisch brothers bought a dozen hotels in Atlantic City and the Catskills.

== Loews ==
In 1960, using the proceeds from their hotel empire, Tisch gained control of Loews Theaters, one of the largest movie house chains at the time, with Bob and Larry as co-chairmen of the company. They were attracted to Loews by its underlying real estate assets which they believed were undervalued. They were correct in this assumption and would later tear down many of the centrally-located old theaters to build apartments and hotels, reaping millions in profits.

The pair soon diversified the business, successfully venturing into a variety of areas. In 1968, Loews Corporation acquired Lorillard, the 5th largest tobacco company in the US at the time, which owned the popular brands Kent, Newport and True. In 1974, they purchased a controlling interest in the nearly bankrupt insurance company, CNA Financial Corporation. This too was successful and several years later it held an A+ credit rating. They also purchased the Bulova Watch Company.

Through acquisitions, Tisch built Loews' into a profitable conglomerate (with 14 hotels, 67 movie theaters, CNA Financial, Bulova, and Lorillard) with revenues increasing from $100 million in 1970 to more than $3 billion in 1980.

In 2002, the year before Larry Tisch's death, the corporation had revenues of more than $17 billion and assets of more than $70 billion.

== CBS ==
In 1986, CBS Inc. was the target of several hostile takeover attempts by the likes of Ted Turner, Marvin Davis, and Ivan Boesky. Tisch was invited by CBS to invest in the company so as to help stop the hostile advances. Tisch spent $750 million for a 24.9% stake in CBS and a seat on the board. Later, with the support of company patriarch William S. Paley, he was named the company's president and CEO.

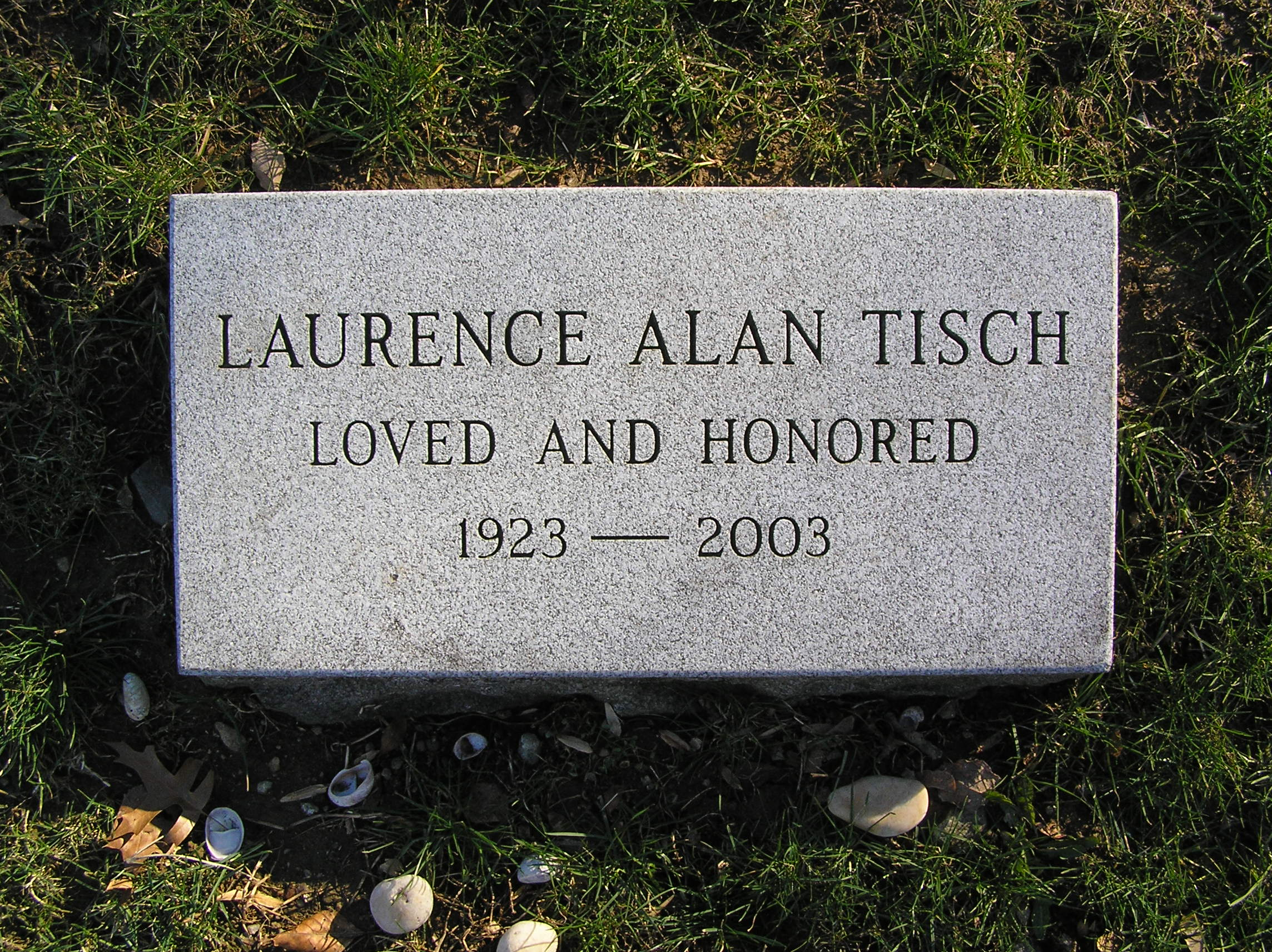
The footstone of Laurence Tisch

The Tisch era at CBS was marked by relentless cost-cutting: Tisch fired 230 out of 1,200 news employees and cut $30 million from the news division's budget. CBS divested itself of non-broadcast assets. In 1986, he sold the book publisher Holt, Rinehart and Winston to Harcourt Brace Jovanovich for $500 million; in 1987, he sold the CBS magazine division to Diamandis Communications; and also in 1987, he sold the CBS Music Group, the 2nd largest record company in the world at the time, to Sony for $2 billion. Westinghouse Electric bought CBS in 1995 for an estimated $5.4 billion, of which Tisch's ownership netted him $2 billion.

Although Tisch's decade long tenure at CBS was marked by a 15% annual increase in the value of its stock, CBS remained in third place out of the big three national networks. Tisch was criticized for not understanding the broadcast business, not diversifying the business after selling its non-broadcast assets, and poor performance of CBS relative to its peers. The network's low occurred on Tisch's watch in 1993, when the network refused to counter the upstart Fox's billion dollar bid for the rights to the NFL's NFC package it held since 1956, resulting in the network losing its NFL rights until picking up the AFC rights in 1998, and a number of affiliates to depart the network for Fox, leaving it to rebuild throughout the rest of the decade.

John Gutfreund, CEO of Salomon Brothers compared him with Bill Paley, the founder of CBS: "Bill had a vision for the industry, for Larry, it is a business."

== Philanthropy ==
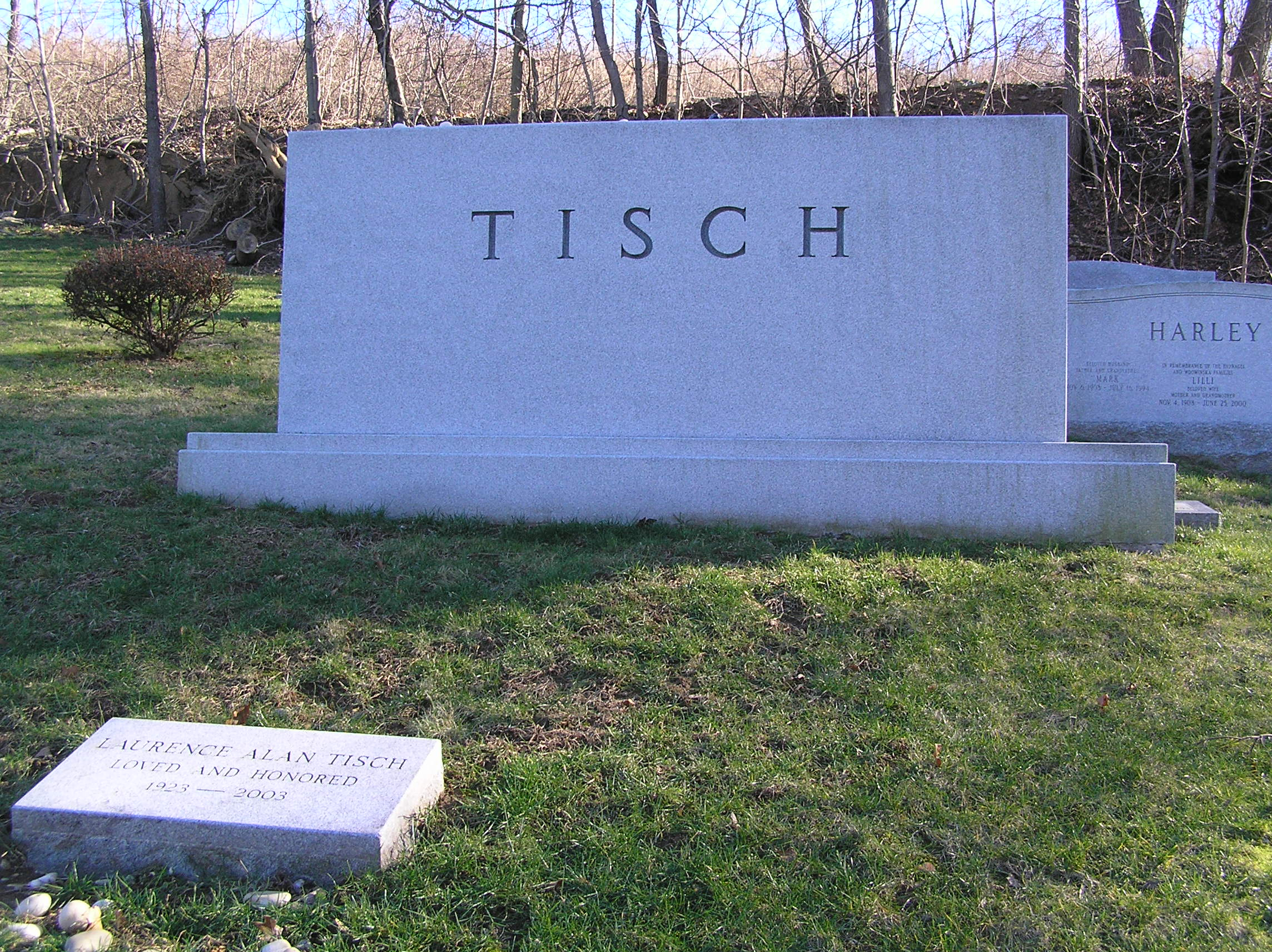
The grave of Laurence Tisch in Westchester Hills Cemetery

Tisch made major donations to the Metropolitan Museum of Art, New York University, the NYU Medical Center and the Wildlife Conservation Society. A $4.5 million gift created the Tisch Children's Zoo in Central Park.

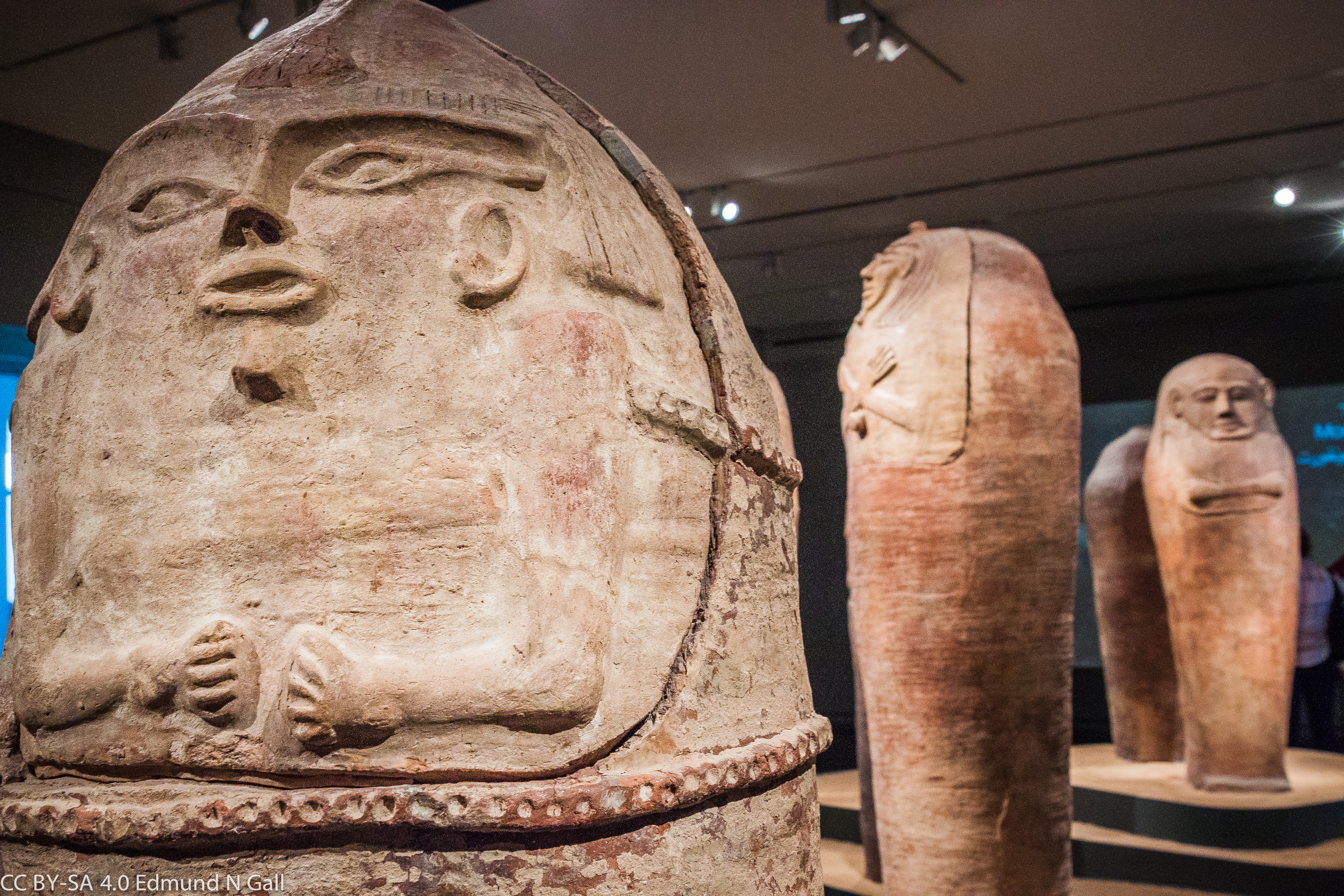
Bronze Age sarcophagi from the Dayan Collection, purchased with funds donated by Tisch, on display at the Israel Museum in Jerusalem.

From 1978 to 1998, Tisch was chairman of the board of trustees at New York University overseeing a $1 billion capital campaign and major improvements in the university. Tisch was also a former president of the United Jewish Appeal of New York. Tisch and his wife donated $900,000 to the Israel Museum to purchase Moshe Dayan's collection from his widow; the purchase was completed in 1982.

NYU's Tisch School of the Arts is named in honor of him and his brother Bob, who donated the funds necessary to buy a building for the school. Tisch's donations also provided funding for a professorship in law, which was established in 2010 and is held by noted legal scholar Richard Epstein. There is additionally a Tisch Hall at the Stern School of Business and a Tisch Hospital at the NYU Medical Center.

The professorship for history and economics in Harvard University is named after him in recognition of his philanthropy to the school. The current Laurence A. Tisch professor is Niall Ferguson, a Scottish economic historian.

== Family ==
Tisch married Wilma "Billie" Stein in 1948. They had four sons:

- Andrew H. Tisch
- Daniel R. Tisch – Runs a family fund, Mentor Partners, and sits on the New York University board. He is also the father of David Tisch.
- James S. Tisch – Father of New York City Police Commissioner Jessica Tisch.
- Thomas Jonah Tisch – Works as a partner at FLF Associates, a private investment group in New York City. In 1985, he married Helen Vivian Scovell.

All four boys went to Suffield Academy in Suffield, Connecticut.

== Death ==
Laurence Tisch died of gastroesophageal cancer, aged 80, in 2003. He was interred at Westchester Hills Cemetery in Hastings-on-Hudson, New York.
