= Suffield Academy =

Prep school in Suffield, Connecticut, US

Location
- 185 North Main Street; Suffield, Connecticut 06078; United States; 41°59′05″N 72°39′01″W

Information
- Type: Private boarding/day school
- Motto: Esse Quam Videri; Latin: To be, rather than to seem
- Founded: 1833 (193 years ago)
- CEEB code: 070765
- Head teacher: Casey Bobo
- Faculty: 90 teachers
- Enrollment: 415 students
- Average class size: 10 students
- Student to teacher ratio: 5:1
- Campus size: 368 acres (149 ha)
- Colors: Black and orange
- Athletics: 20 interscholastic sports teams
- Mascot: Tiger
- Website: www.suffieldacademy.org

Suffield Academy is a private preparatory school located in Suffield, Connecticut. It was founded in 1833 to train young men for ministry in the Baptist Church. The tuition fees for students are currently $71,500 for boarding students and $49,500 for day students. The head of the school is Casey Bobo, who has been in post since 2026. The school is coeducational, with slightly more than half the students (55%) being boys. Approximately 15% of the student body are students of color, 18% are international students, and 67% are boarders.

Fourteen dormitories on campus house the boarding students with 90 faculty members serving as dormitory and student advisors as well as teachers and coaches.

== History ==
The early mission of the school was to educate young men for the ministry. Despite its founding links to the Baptist Church, the institute quickly moved towards a non-denominational model and in 1833 was renamed Connecticut Literary Institute, locally known as CLI. The institute was the only high school in town, and local government funding helped to pay for each student's tuition.

The school's library

== Athletics ==
Suffield competes regularly in a number of interscholastic sports, with a total of 51 teams in 21 sports. There are Varsity, JV, Thirds and Fourths levels throughout several sports. Teams compete against schools including Deerfield Academy, Hotchkiss School, Choate Rosemary Hall, Berkshire School, Kent School, Loomis Chaffee, and Westminster.

Fall sports

- Cross country
- Football
- Soccer
- Field Hockey
- Volleyball
- Men's Water polo

Winter sports

- Basketball
- Alpine skiing
- Squash
- Swimming and diving
- Wrestling
- Riflery

Spring sports

- Women's water polo
- Crew
- Lacrosse
- Baseball
- Softball
- Tennis
- Golf
- Track and field

== Notable alumni ==
- Ledyard Bill (1836–1907), politician, book publisher, and historical writer
- Kevin McKeown, 1965 - former mayor of Santa Monica, California
- Andrew H. Tisch, 1967
- George B. Daniels, 1971 - United States federal judge for the United States District Court for the Southern District of New York
- James S. Tisch, 1971
- Tarō Kōno, 1981 - Japanese Foreign Minister
- Vinny Del Negro, 1984 - NBA player for the San Antonio Spurs, former NBA head coach NBA's Los Angeles Clippers
- Christian Wilkins, 2015 - NFL player for the Las Vegas Raiders, 13th overall pick in the 2019 NFL draft by the Miami Dolphins
- Christian Moore, 2021 - first round pick in the 2024 Major League Baseball draft for the Los Angeles Angels
