= Boardwalk Pipelines =

Energy company in Houston, Texas

Boardwalk Pipeline Partners, LP
- Type: Subsidiary
- Industry: Energy
- Founded: 2005; 21 years ago
- Headquarters: Houston, Texas, U.S.
- Key people: Stanley C. Horton (president and CEO)
- Products: Transport and storage of natural gas and natural gas liquids
- Revenue: $1,307.2 mil (FY2016)
- Net income: $302.2 mil (FY2016)
- Total assets: US$8.6 billion (FY2016)
- Number of employees: 1,280 dec'16
- Parent: Loews Corporation
- Website: www.bwpipelines.com

Boardwalk Pipeline Partners, LP, which conducts business through its primary subsidiary Boardwalk Pipelines, LP and its subsidiaries, is an energy company based in Houston, Texas. It is a master limited partnership operating in the midstream portion of the natural gas and natural gas liquids (NGLs) industry, primarily providing transportation and storage for those commodities. Boardwalk owns approximately 14,365 miles (23,118 km) of natural gas and NGLs pipelines and underground storage caverns having an aggregate capacity of approximately 205 billion cubic feet (Bcf) of working natural gas and 24.0 million barrels (3.8 million cubic metres) of NGLs. Boardwalk's pipeline system originates in the Gulf Coast region, Oklahoma and Arkansas and extends north and east to the Midwestern states of Tennessee, Kentucky, Illinois, Indiana, and Ohio, and Boardwalk's NGLs pipeline and storage facilities are located in Louisiana and Texas.

Boardwalk Pipelines Holding Corp., which is a wholly owned subsidiary of Loews Corporation, owns 100% of Boardwalk Pipeline Partners's capital.

== History ==
Loews Corporation (NYSE: L) bought Texas Gas Transmission, LLC in May 2003 and Gulf South Pipeline Company, LP in December 2004.

These two interstate natural gas pipeline companies were consolidated into a new entity – Boardwalk Pipeline Partners, LP – which went public in 2005. Boardwalk placed into service a third interstate natural gas pipeline company, Gulf Crossing Pipeline Company LLC, in 2009.

In 2011, Boardwalk acquired the Petal and Hattiesburg natural gas storage companies, which were merged into Gulf South in 2015.

In 2012, Boardwalk acquired Boardwalk Louisiana Midstream, LLC, which diversified Boardwalk's operations into the natural gas liquids business, serving petrochemical markets in southern Louisiana.

In 2014, Boardwalk acquired Evangeline ethylene pipeline system, further expanding Boardwalk's service offerings to petrochemical customers. Boardwalk Field Services, LLC develops and operates gas gathering, compression, dehydration, treating, and processing infrastructure, and in June 2013 placed its processing plant into service.

In 2018, Loews Corporation acquired Boardwalk so that it became a subsidiary company, with its stock being delisted from the New York Stock Exchange.

In 2021 the Delaware Court of Chancery ruled for the former partners in the case Bandera Master Fund LP et al v Boardwalk Pipeline Partners LP et al which awarded them $690M, but the case is being appealed.
