= Jamie Tisch =

American businesswoman

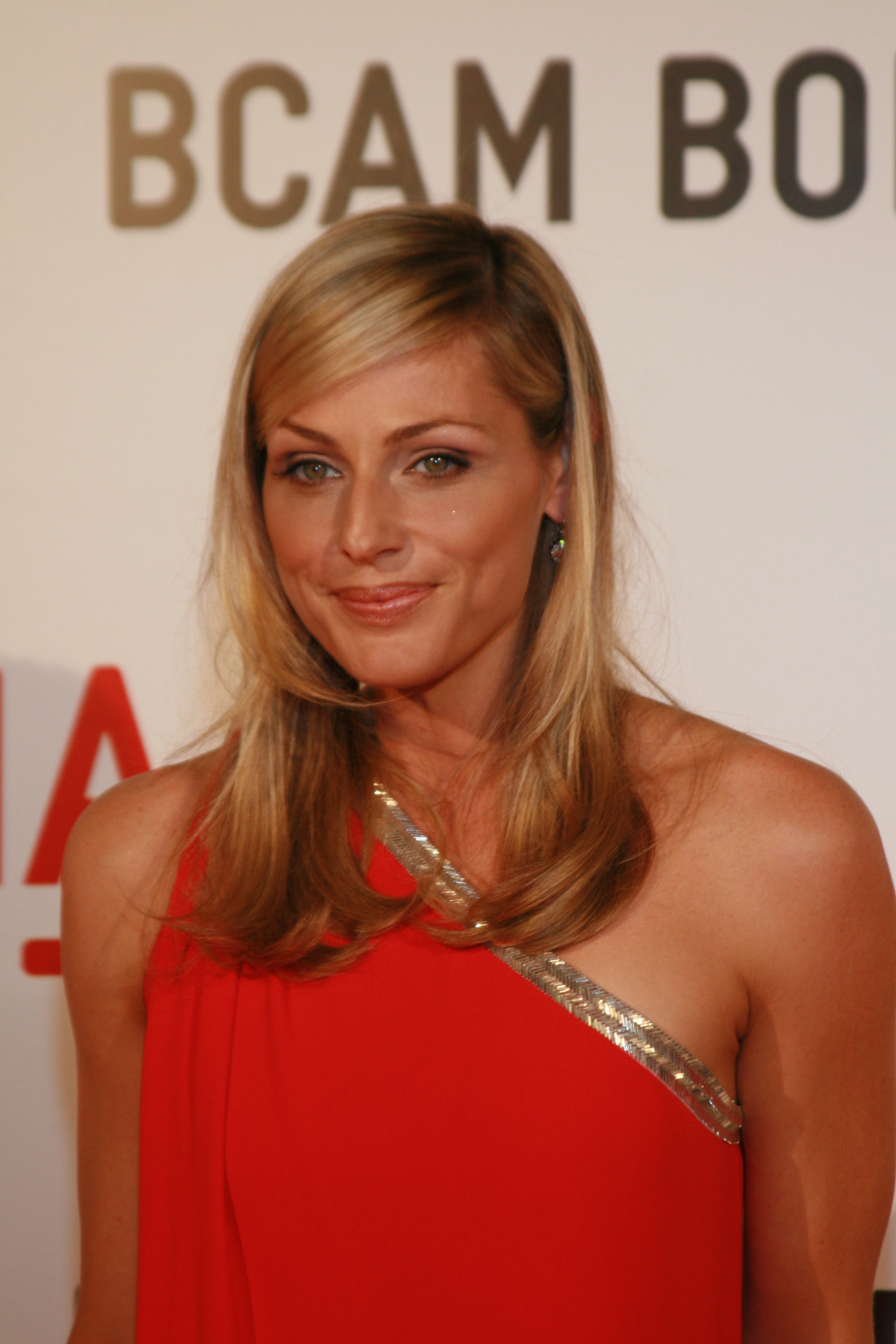
- Jamie Tisch arriving at LACMA’s Gala Opening of the Broad Contemporary Art Museum on February 9, 2008 in Los Angeles, CA.
- Born: Jamie Leigh Anne Alexander; August 30, 1968 (age 58); Alabama
- Occupation: philanthropist
- Spouse: Steve Tisch (divorced)
- Children: Zachary Tisch; Holden Tisch; Elizabeth Tisch
- Parent(s): Linda Tanana; Edgar Franklin Alexander

Jamie Leigh Anne Alexander Tisch (born August 30, 1968) is an American businesswoman and philanthropist.

== Early life and education ==
Jamie Alexander Tisch was born on August 30, 1968, in Alabama. She is the daughter of Linda (née Tanana) and Edgar Franklin Alexander, who worked in air base technology.

== Career ==
In 2008, Tisch and long-time friend, Elizabeth Wiatt opened Fashionology LA, a retail store in Beverly Hills, California, featuring a build-a-bear approach to clothing.

== Philanthropy ==
In 2003 Tisch Co-Founded the Entertainment Industry's Women's Cancer Research Fund (WCRF) along with Marion Laurie, Anne Douglas, Kelly Meyer and Quinn Ezralow. The Women's Cancer Research Fund was created to support innovative research, education, and outreach directed towards the early diagnosis, treatment and prevention of all women's cancers.

In October 2013, she co-chaired the black-tie gala for the opening of the Wallis Annenberg Center for the Performing Arts in Beverly Hills.

== Personal life ==
She married Steve Tisch in October 1996 and later divorced. They have three children: Zachary, Holden and Elizabeth.
