= Steve Tisch =

American businessman and sports team owner (born 1949)

Steven Tisch
- Tisch in 2018

Personal information
- Born: February 14, 1949 (age 77); Lakewood Township, New Jersey, U.S.

Career information
- College: Tufts University

Career history
- New York Giants (2005–2025) Chairman/Executive Vice President/Co-Owner; New York Giants (2026–present) Chairman/Executive Vice President

Awards and highlights
- 2× Super Bowl champion (XLII, XLVI)

Steven Elliot Tisch (born February 14, 1949) is an American film producer and businessman. From November 2005 to March 2026, he was the co-owner of the New York Giants (however he remained the team's Chairman & Executive Vice President in a ceremonial role that reduces his operational involvement in the organization to almost none), the NFL team co-owned by his family. He is also a film and television producer. He is the son of former Giants co-owner Preston Robert Tisch.

== Early life ==
Tisch was born in Lakewood Township, New Jersey, the son of Joan (née Hyman) and Preston Robert Tisch, a film and television executive who also served as the United States Postmaster General. He has two siblings, Jonathan Tisch and Laurie Tisch. His family is Jewish. He attended Tufts University, during which he began his filmmaking career.

== Career ==
=== 1970s–2000 ===
During his youth, Tisch made a number of small films with Columbia Pictures' backing. In 1976, he left Columbia and made his first feature film, Outlaw Blues. In 1977, Tisch partnered with Jon Avnet and formed its first production partnership, Tisch/Avnet Productions, a partnership that continued until 1985. In 1983, he made Risky Business, in which Tom Cruise had his first lead role.

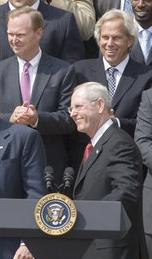
Tisch (far right) visiting the White House in April 2008

In 1984, Tisch produced the made-for-TV movie The Burning Bed, which caused controversy and received 11 Emmy nominations for Farrah Fawcett's depiction of a battered wife. In 1985, Tisch launched his own production company, the Steve Tisch Company, which has since specialized in small-screen films, after breaking up its partnership with Jon Avnet. The company originally had a two-picture agreement with New World Pictures, with Soul Man being the first film of a proposed two-picture deal. In 1987, the company set up multiple projects at Warner Bros., including the feature rights to the Mr. Magoo character (Disney eventually made the project in 1997 as a live-action film) and three original projects. Tisch also produced several critically acclaimed films, including Forrest Gump, American History X, and Snatch. He received a Best Motion Picture Academy Award and a Golden Globe for Forrest Gump, which was nominated for 13 Academy Awards and won six, and remains one of the highest domestic box-office grossing films. Tisch is also the only person to have received a Golden Globe, an Academy Award, a Primetime Emmy Award nomination, and a Super Bowl Ring. In 1999, he developed and produced a television pilot, Mission Extreme, for Film Roman and Max Degree TV, but it was canceled due to lack of international backers. Also that year, he was one of the founding partners of GoCoverage.com with Jon Avnet and Howard Baldwin, but soon collapsed.

=== 2001–present ===
Tisch is a partner at Escape Artists, an independently financed film production company based at Sony Pictures Entertainment that resulted from a merger between the Steve Tisch Company and Todd Black's and Jason Blumenthal's production company Black & Blu. Escape Artists released The Weather Man in 2005 and Columbia Pictures released The Pursuit of Happyness in 2006. Other projects include Seven Pounds, Knowing, and The Taking of Pelham 123. The company's television projects include Perpetual Grace, LTD for Epix, and Servant for Apple TV+.

In 2007, Tufts University gave Tisch the P. T. Barnum Award for exceptional work in media and entertainment.

In 2005, Tisch became chairman and executive vice president of the New York Giants football team. He accepted the Vince Lombardi Trophy twice, when the Giants won Super Bowl XLII and when they won Super Bowl XLVI. On April 30, 2008, President George W. Bush invited Tisch and the rest of the Giants team and administration to the White House to honor their Super Bowl victory.

Tisch appeared in season 5 of the reality show Shark Tank.

After the 2021 season, when the Giants finished 4-13, Tisch "pushed" John Mara to fire head coach Joe Judge when Mara was reportedly willing to give Judge a third season.

On March 11, 2026, amid backlash from the publicization of his relationship with Jeffrey Epstein, Tisch and his siblings, Laurie and Jonathan, requested the NFL's approval to transfer their ownership stakes in the Giants to their children's trusts. Until the transfer request is approved, Tisch is expected to remain involved in the franchise. He attended the team's last minicamp practice in June 2026.

== Personal life ==
Tisch has been married twice. He had two children with his first wife, Patsy A. Tisch; the marriage ended in divorce. Their son William Tisch is an owner and managing member of the Eldridge Hospitality Group, a New York-based owner and operator of restaurants and nightlife venues.

In 1996, Tisch married Jamie Leigh Anne Alexander. They had three children before divorcing.

On August 10, 2020, Tisch announced that his daughter from his first marriage, Hilary, died by suicide after a history of depression. She was 36.

Tisch's brother Jonathan is the Giants' treasurer. His cousin Jessica is commissioner of the New York City Police Department.

=== Relationship with Jeffrey Epstein ===
Tisch was mentioned over 400 times in files relating to Jeffrey Epstein the United States Department of Justice released on January 30, 2026. The files reveal that Epstein scouted for women Tisch called "working girls". In one email, Epstein followed up with Tisch about a woman from Ukraine he arranged to be with him, writing, "she is a little freaked by the age difference but go slow".

In response, Tisch released the following statement: "We had a brief association where we exchanged emails about adult women, and in addition, we discussed movies, philanthropy, and investments. I did not take him up on any of his invitations and never went to his island. As we all know now, he was a terrible person and someone I deeply regret associating with." The NFL is investigating the matter.

== Filmography ==
=== Film ===
==== As a producer ====
Year	Film	Credit	Notes
1977	Outlaw Blues		
1978	Almost Summer	Executive producer	
1980	Coast to Coast		
1983	Risky Business		
1983	Deal of the Century	Executive producer	
1986	Soul Man		
1988	Big Business		
1988	Hot to Trot		
1989	Heart of Dixie		
1990	Heart Condition		
1990	Bad Influence		
1994	Forrest Gump		
1994	Corrina, Corrina		
1996	The Long Kiss Goodnight	Executive producer	
1996	Dear God		
1997	Wild America	Executive producer	
1997	The Postman		
1998	American History X	Executive producer	
1998	Lock, Stock and Two Smoking Barrels	Executive producer	
1998	Nico the Unicorn	Executive producer	Direct-to-video
1999	Wayward Son	Executive producer	
2000	Snatch	Executive producer	
2000	Looking for an Echo	Executive producer	
2003	Alex & Emma	Executive producer	
2005	The Weather Man		
2006	The Pursuit of Happyness		
2008	Seven Pounds		
2009	Knowing		
2009	The Taking of Pelham 123		
2010	The Back-up Plan		
2012	Hope Springs	Executive producer	
2014	Sex Tape		
2014	The Equalizer		
2015	Unfinished Business		
2015	Southpaw		
2017	The Upside		
2018	The Equalizer 2		
2019	Troop Zero		
2021	Pig		
2021	Being the Ricardos		
2021	A Journal for Jordan		
2022	The Man from Toronto		
2023	Cassandro	Executive producer	
2023	The Equalizer 3		
2026	Voicemails for Isabelle		
2026	Madden		

==== As an actor ====
Year	Film	Role	Notes
1971	Cry Uncle!	Man Running from Motel	Uncredited
1996	Dear God	Neighbor with Dog	
2010	Brother's Justice	Steve	
2015	Entourage	Board Member	

==== Miscellaneous crew ====
Year	Film	Role
1971	Cry Uncle!	Production assistant
1971	Such Good Friends	Production assistant

==== Thanks ====
Year	Film	Role
1995	Man of the Year	Very special thanks
2018	The Dive	Special thanks

=== Television ===
==== In Production Role ====
Year	Title	Credit	Notes
1975	The Missing Are Deadly	Associate producer	Television film
1979	No Other Love	Executive producer	Television film
1980	Homeward Bound		Television film
1982	Prime Suspect		Television film
1982	Something So Right	Executive producer	Television film
1984	Calendar Girl Murders	Executive producer	Television film
1984	The Burning Bed	Executive producer	Television film
1984	Silence of the Heart	Executive producer	Television film
1984−85	Call to Glory	Executive producer	
1986	Triplecross	Executive producer	Television film
1987	In Love and War	Executive producer	Television film
1988	Evil in Clear River	Co-producer	Television film
1988	Dirty Dancing		
1989	Out on the Edge	Executive producer	Television film
1990	Judgment	Executive producer	Television film
1991	CBS Schoolbreak Special		
1991	Vidiots	Executive producer	Television film
1992	Afterburn	Executive producer	Television film
1992	Keep the Change	Executive producer	Television film
1992	Freshman Dorm	Executive producer	
1996	The People Next Door	Executive producer	Television film
2000	Mission Extreme	Co-producer	
2016	Prototype	Executive producer	Television film
2019	Perpetual Grace, LTD	Executive producer	
2019	Why We Hate	Executive producer	Documentary
2021	Dr. Death	Executive producer	
2019−23	Servant	Executive producer	

==== As an actor ====
Year	Title	Role	Notes
1995	Seinfeld	Man in Café	Uncredited
2017	Billions	Himself	

==== As director ====
Year	Title
1989	Dirty Dancing
