= Jonathan Tisch =

American businessman (born 1953)

Jonathan M. Tisch
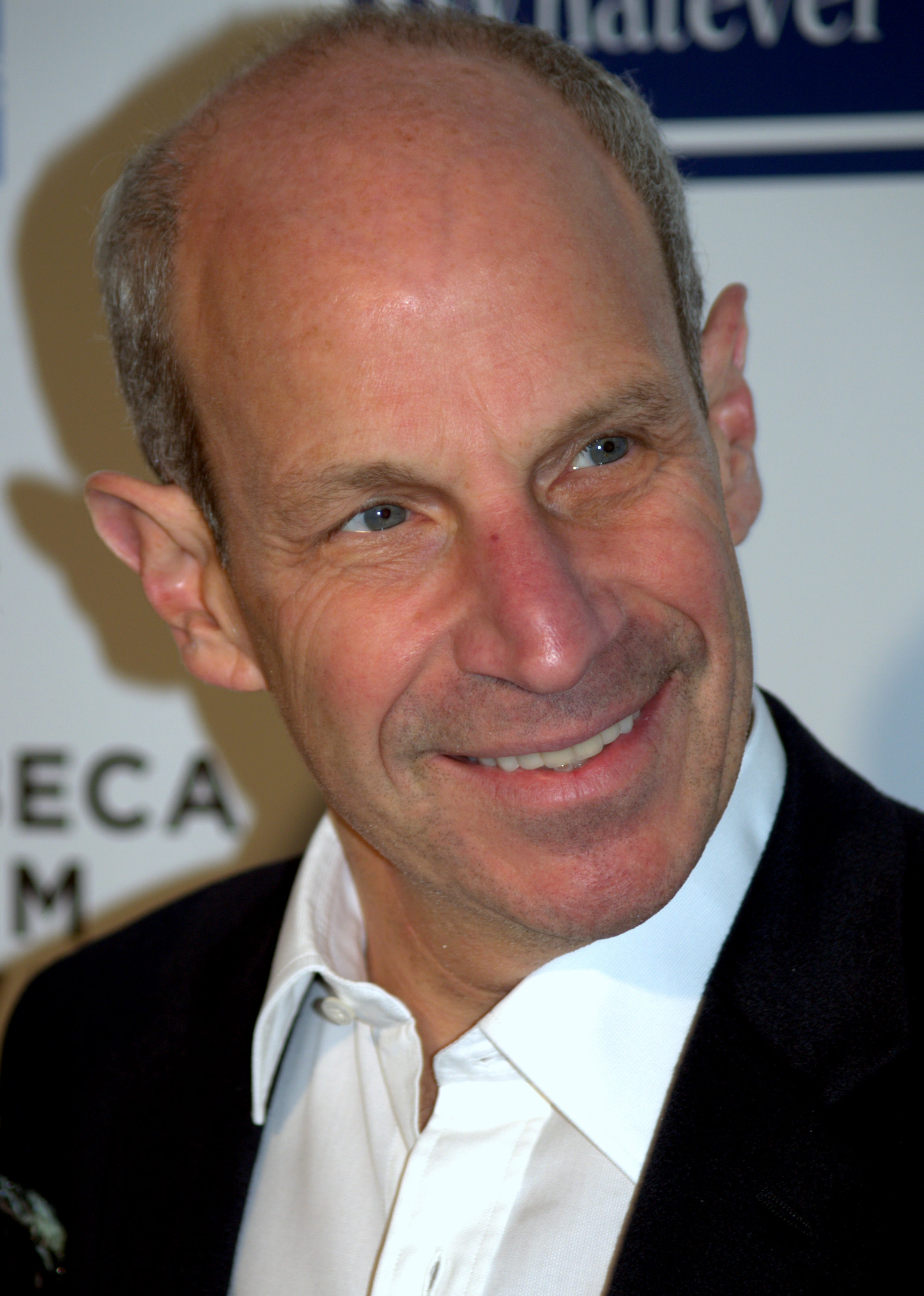
- Tisch in 2009
- Born: December 7, 1953 (age 72); Atlantic City, New Jersey, US
- Education: Tufts University
- Occupation: Businessman
- Spouse(s): Laura Steinberg (divorced); Lizzie Rudnick (2007–)
- Parents: Preston Robert Tisch (father); Joan Tisch (mother)

Jonathan Mark Tisch (born December 7, 1953) is an American businessman and a son of billionaire Preston Robert Tisch, who was co-owner of luxury hospitality company Loews Hotels and of the New York Giants football team. Tisch inherited co-ownership of both.

Tisch is a philanthropist who serves as a board member of the Tribeca Film Institute.

== Career ==
Tisch graduated from Tufts University in 1976.

In 1989, Tisch was named chairman of Loews Hotels, a wholly owned subsidiary of Loews Corporation. The following year, he launched the Loews Hotels Good Neighbor Policy.

Tisch serves as chairman emeritus of the U.S. Travel Association, the national non-profit association representing all segments of the multibillion-dollar travel industry. For six years, he served as chairman of NYC & Company, the city's official tourism marketing agency and convention and visitors bureau.

After September 11, Tisch served as chairman of New York Rising, a task force set committed to reviving tourism in New York City. Crain's New York Business named Tisch one of the "Top Ten Most Influential Business Leaders"; in 2006, he was named "CEO of the Year" by the Executive Council of New York.

A co-owner of the New York Giants, he serves on the board of directors and is the team's treasurer. In 2010, Tisch joined New York Jets owner Woody Johnson as co-chairs of the bid committee established to bring Super Bowl XLVIII to the New York/New Jersey metropolitan area, which happened in 2014 when the Super Bowl was played at MetLife Stadium.

On December 31, 2024, Jonathan Tisch stepped down as director and co-chairman of Loews Corporation's Offices of the President, though he continued to serve as executive chairman of Loews Hotels and as a director emeritus.

On March 11, 2026, Tisch along with his siblings, Steve and Laurie, made a request to the NFL to approve the transfer of their ownership stakes in the New York Giants to their children’s trusts following the backlash from Steve's relationship with Jeffrey Epstein.

== Publications ==
=== Books ===
Tisch has co-written three books: The Power of We: Succeeding Through Partnerships, Chocolates on the Pillow Aren't Enough: Reinventing the Customer Experience (John Wiley & Sons, 2007), and Citizen You: Doing Your Part to Change the World.

=== Media ===
He is the host of Beyond the Boardroom with Jonathan Tisch, where he interviews American businesspeople. In 2008, Tisch co-founded Walnut Hill Media, LLC, privately held company that invests in media ventures such as Tribeca Enterprises. Tisch appears as an actor in several films, including Confessions of a Shopaholic.

== Philanthropy ==
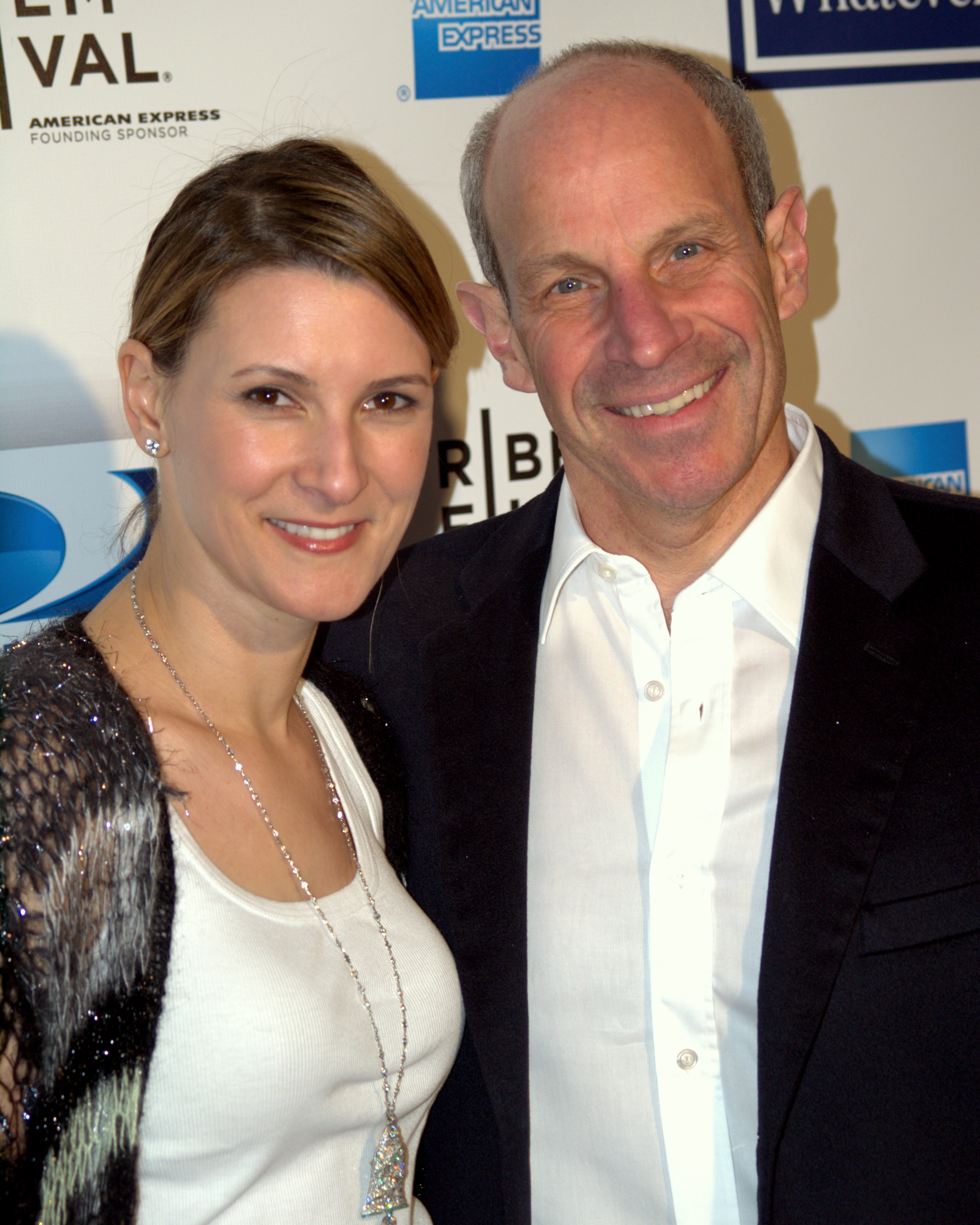
Lizzie and Jonathan Tisch at the 2009 Tribeca Film Festival.

Tisch served as the vice-chairman of The Welfare to Work Partnership, and currently serves on the Board of Trustees for Tufts University. Tisch gave an endowed gift of $40 million to fund the Jonathan M. Tisch College of Citizenship and Public Service which celebrated its tenth anniversary in 2011. Tisch is on the board of the Tribeca Film Institute

In 2011, Lizzie and Jonathan Tisch gave $10 million to The Metropolitan Museum of Art to support an exhibition space within the Costume Institute to be named The Lizzie and Jonathan Tisch Gallery.

In March 2022, Tisch said he would give $25 million to his high school alma mater, The Frederick Gunn School, to build the Lizzie and Jonathan Tisch Center for Innovation and Active Citizenship.

Lizzie has served on the Board of Trustees of NewYork–Presbyterian Hospital since 2015.

Tisch was elected chairman of the board of The Shed, a New York City arts center, in 2022.

== Awards ==
In June 2022, Tisch was named by the International Hospitality Institute to its Global 100 in Hospitality list.

== Personal life ==
Tisch was born to a Jewish family, the son of Joan (née Hyman) and Preston Robert Tisch, who was co-owner of Loews Hotels and of the New York Giants.

In 1988, he married Laura Steinberg, the daughter of financier and insurance executive Saul Steinberg, at the Central Synagogue in Manhattan. They divorced in 2000.

In 2007, he married Lizzie Stern Rudnick.
