= Preston Robert Tisch =

American businessman and philanthropist (1926–2005)

- Bob Tisch, official portrait

68th United States Postmaster General
- In office August 16, 1986 – March 1, 1988
- President: Ronald Reagan
- Preceded by: Albert Vincent Casey
- Succeeded by: Anthony M. Frank

Personal details
- Born: April 29, 1926 New York City, U.S.
- Died: November 15, 2005 (aged 79) New York City, U.S.
- Party: Democratic
- Spouse: Joan Hyman
- Children: Steve Tisch; Jonathan Tisch; Laurie Tisch
- Education: University of Michigan (BA)

Preston Robert Tisch (April 29, 1926 – November 15, 2005) was an American businessman who was the chairman of the Loews Corporation, which he co-owned with his brother Laurence Tisch. From 1991 until his death, Tisch owned half of the New York Giants football team, sharing ownership with Wellington Mara.

== Early life ==
Tisch was born in 1926 in the Bensonhurst section of Brooklyn, the son of Sadye (née Brenner) and Al Tisch. His father's parents had emigrated from Ukraine and his mother's parents from Poland, and were of Jewish descent. His father, a former All-American basketball player at the City University of New York, owned a garment factory and two summer camps which his wife helped him run.

Tisch attended DeWitt Clinton High School for a year before transferring to Erasmus Hall High School in Brooklyn. Tisch received a BA degree in economics from the University of Michigan in 1948, and his wife Joan Tisch and his daughter also received degrees at the university. While in college, Tisch was a member of Sigma Alpha Mu, a Jewish fraternity.

== Career ==
On August 16, 1986, he was appointed Postmaster General of the United States Postal Service, serving until March 1, 1988.

=== New York Giants (1991-2005) ===
In 1991, Tisch purchased fifty percent of the New York Giants of the National Football League. The team had been owned by the Mara family since the team's founding, but the stakes were split at the time between Wellington Mara and his brother Jack's family, with Jack's son Tim given control of his father's share upon his death. Tim was ill at the time, fighting Hodgkin's disease, and no longer desired to participate in the team's operations; Tisch and Tim's family would eventually come to terms on the purchase of their share of the team shortly after the Giants won Super Bowl XXV. During his time as owner, Tisch contributed to the business operations of the team, using his experiences as an executive to manage the team's front office. Tisch was also on the NFL's Finance and Super Bowl Policy committees.

Tisch held the share until he died on November 15, 2005, from brain cancer. Tisch died three weeks after Wellington Mara and two years after his brother Laurence. He bequeathed his share of the Giants to his son Steve, who co-owns the team with Mara's son John.

Tisch was posthumously inducted into the New York Giants' Ring of Honor in 2010.

=== Business career ===
Tisch began his career in business in 1946, when he opened the Grand Hotel with his brother Larry. After years of losing money, the hotel burnt down under suspicious circumstances. The brothers continued to expand their hotel business, building the Americana Hotel in Bal Harbor in 1957, designed to attract convention business, one of the first such hotels in the country. Later on, he led the hospitality and hotel industry to a large expansion between the 1960s and 1970s.

Tisch for 19 years was chairman of the New York Convention and Visitors Bureau, also known as NYC & Company, which spearheaded NYC's "The Big Apple" campaign and popularized the nickname. He purchased stock in Loew's Inc. in 1958, acquired a controlling share in 1959, and created Loew's Corporation as a parent company of Loew's Theatres and Loew's Hotels in 1970. Bob was named president and Chief Operating Officer of Loews in 1968. In 1968, Loews acquired Lorillard, the 5th-largest tobacco company in the United States at the time, which owned the popular brands Kent, Newport, and True. Bob and his brother retired as co-CEOs of Loews on December 31, 1998. Loews eventually diversified into fields such as insurance and natural gas.

== Philanthropy ==
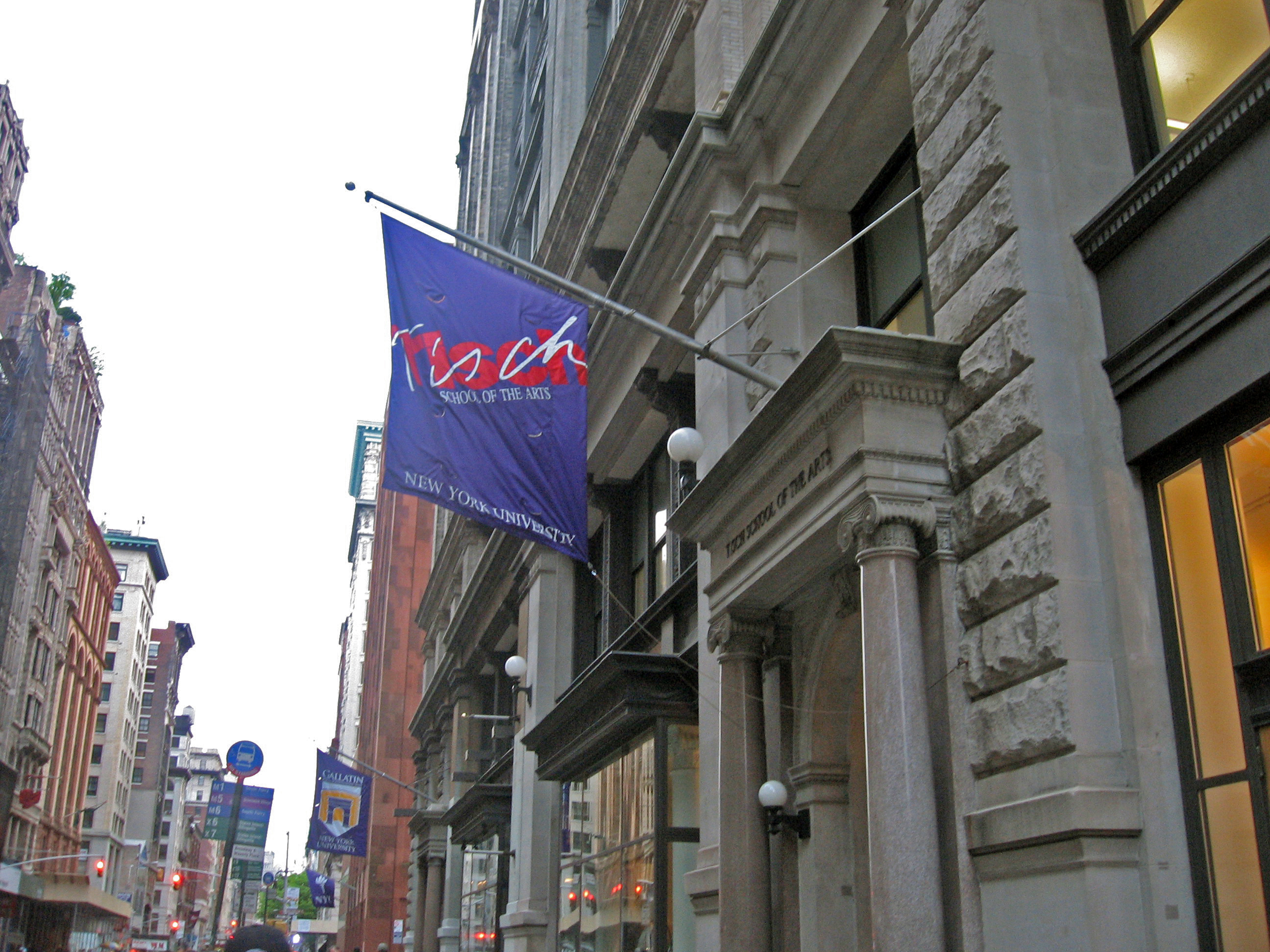
New York University's Tisch School of the Arts

Tisch made substantial donations to his alma maters. Tisch Hall, on the University of Michigan central campus, houses the school's history department. The school also has a Preston R. Tisch Professorship in Judaic Studies and the Preston Robert Tisch Tennis Building.

New York University's Tisch School of the Arts and NYU Medical Center's Tisch Hospital are named after Laurence A. and Preston Robert Tisch. NYU's Preston Robert Tisch Center for Hospitality, Tourism, and Sports Management was founded in 1995 and expanded in 1999. In 1997, the Central Park Zoo opened the Tisch Children's Zoo.

Given two months to live by his New York doctors, Tisch lived for 14 more months under care at Duke University Medical Center. In October 2005, the Tisch family donated $10 million to the Duke Brain Tumor Center, which was renamed the Preston Robert Tisch Brain Tumor Center.

The Tisch Building in New York City, which is the headquarters of the Gay Men's Health Crisis (GMHC), is named for him and his wife, who is on the GMHC Board of Directors, after they donated $3.5 million for it in March 1997.

Tisch was a founding member of the Association for a Better New York, which tackles city problems that had previously fallen to the city's agencies. He helped to found Citymeals on Wheels and personally served meals to the city's elderly.

There is a Tisch Center for the Arts at the 92Y in New York, and Tisch Galleries at the Metropolitan Museum of Arts. Tisch founded the charity Take the Field, which raised $135 million in public and private funds to repair 43 athletic fields in New York City.

== Awards and honors ==
- 1982 – Golden Plate Award of the American Academy of Achievement
- 1995 – Frank W. Berkman Tourism Achievement Award
- 2000 – Hospitality Industry Hall of Honor, Conrad N. Hilton College, Hilton University of Houston
- 2010 – The Events Industry Council Hall of Leaders
- 2010 - New York Giants Ring of Honor

In 2007, the University at Albany, where the Giants held training camp for many years, named their practice field after Tisch and co-owner Wellington Mara.

== Personal life ==
In 1948, he married Joan Hyman. They had three children: Steve Tisch, Jonathan Tisch, and Laurie Tisch.

Government offices
Preceded by Albert Vincent Casey	United States Postmaster General; August 16, 1986 – March 1, 1988	Succeeded by Anthony M. Frank
