= Loews Corporation =

American conglomerate

- Type: Public
- Traded as: NYSE: L; S&P 500 component
- Industry: Conglomerate
- Founded: 1946; 80 years ago (as hotel business); 1959; 67 years ago (as Loews Corporation)
- Headquarters: Solow Building; New York City, United States
- Key people: James Tisch (chairman); Ben Tisch (president & CEO)
- Products: insurance, hotels, oil drilling, pipeline transport
- Revenue: ▲US$18.5 billion (2025)
- Net income: ▲US$1.67 billion (2025)
- Total assets: ▲US$86.3 billion (2025)
- Total equity: ▲US$18.7 billion (2025)
- Number of employees: 13,000 (2024)
- Subsidiaries: Altium Packaging (53%); Boardwalk Pipelines; CNA Financial (89%); Loews Hotels
- Website: loews.com

Loews Corporation is an American conglomerate headquartered in New York City. The company's majority-stake holdings include CNA Financial Corporation, Boardwalk Pipelines, Loews Hotels and Altium Packaging.

Loews positions itself as a value investor with a long-term focus. The company has allocated significant capital for share buybacks, spending $1.3 billion on share repurchases in the three years ending December 31, 2012. Between 1971 and 2020, Loews reduced its shares outstanding from 1.3 billion to 291 million.

== History ==
Old Loews logo

Loews Corporation traces its roots to 1946 when Laurence Tisch persuaded his parents to invest $125,000 to buy a resort hotel in Lakewood, New Jersey. Laurence's brother Robert joined the business shortly thereafter. The Tisch brothers began to invest their profits in expanding the hotel business. By 1956, the brothers were in a position to build their first hotel, the Americana in Bal Harbour, Florida, for $17 million in cash.

In the wake of the landmark 1948 Supreme Court antitrust ruling in United States v. Paramount Pictures, Inc., all the major movie studios were ordered to separate from the movie theater chains that had been commonly owned and operated.In 1959, the Tisch brothers purchased a controlling interest in Loew's Theatres, a nationwide chain of 102 movie theaters, as Metro-Goldwyn-Mayer (formed by theater magnate Marcus Loew's acquisition of three production companies) became a separate entity. This acquisition formed the foundation of the modern-day Loews Corporation, and the company was listed on the New York Stock Exchange that same year.

By the summer of 1960, the brothers became co-chairmen. The theaters were aging and not suited to then-current movie-going trends, which anticipated the multiplex; however, the theaters were located on highly valuable city property. Almost immediately, the Tisch brothers began closing and demolishing many of these theaters, selling the vacant lots to developers. This hastened the end of the classic movie "palaces" from the Golden Age of Hollywood.

The brothers soon diversified the Loews business, successfully venturing into a variety of areas as the 1960s and 1970s progressed. Loews acquired Lorillard Tobacco Company in 1968, CNA Financial in 1974, and the Bulova Watch Company in 1979. Through acquisitions, Loews's revenues grew from $100 million in 1970 to more than $3 billion by a decade later.

Loews sold the theater business in 1985 (it continued operating under the Loew's brand name, while the investment company operates as Loews). Laurence Tisch briefly owned, through Loews, a significant portion of US television and radio broadcaster CBS in the 1980s. As chairman of CBS, he also approved the deal that brought late-night host David Letterman to the network from NBC. Loews involvement in CBS ended in 1995, with the sale of CBS to Westinghouse Electric Corporation for $5.4 billion.

In the late 1980s, Loews diversified into the energy business. In 1989, the company acquired Diamond M Drilling. The subsidiary acquired ODECO in 1992, adding 39 oil rigs. A year later, the combined businesses were renamed Diamond Offshore. The operating subsidiary, which went public in 1995, provides contract drilling services to the energy industry globally.

Diamond Offshore filed for Chapter 11 bankruptcy in April 2020, amid the COVID-19 recession and a collapse in oil demand. Loews deconsolidated Diamond from its financial statements that quarter. Diamond emerged from bankruptcy in April 2021 after equitizing approximately $2.1 billion in senior unsecured notes. In September 2024, Noble Corporation completed its acquisition of Diamond Offshore in a cash-and-stock transaction valued at approximately $1.6 billion, ending Loews's involvement in offshore drilling.

In 2003, Loews purchased Texas Gas Transmission, then bought Gulf South Pipeline Company a year later. These two companies were consolidated into a new entity, Boardwalk Pipeline Partners, which went public in 2005. Structured as a midstream master limited partnership (MLP), Boardwalk Pipeline provides transportation, storage, gathering, and processing of natural gas and liquids for its customers.

In July 2018, Loews exercised a call-right provision in Boardwalk's partnership agreement and took the company private, paying $12.06 per unit to acquire all outstanding public limited partnership units in a transaction valued at approximately $1.5 billion. Minority unitholders filed suit in Delaware. The litigation continued through multiple appeals; in December 2025, the Delaware Supreme Court resolved most claims in Loews's favor while remanding one issue for further proceedings.

On May 10, 2006, Loews Corporation announced that it would offer 15 million shares of Carolina Group via a public offering, with the proceeds to be used for general corporate purposes. The sale's value was $740 million.

Loews Corporation was the parent company of Bulova from 1979 until 2007, when it sold the company to Citizen Watch.

On June 4, 2007, Loews Corporation announced it would acquire a portion of the operations of Dominion Resources for $4.03 billion dollars. Loews rebranded the assets HighMount Exploration & Production. This wholly owned subsidiary is engaged in the exploration and production of natural gas and natural gas liquids. On May 23, 2014, Loews announced that HighMount is pursuing strategic alternatives, including a potential sale of business. HighMount was sold to the private equity firm EnerVest for $805 million, a substantial loss on the original $4.03 billion acquisition price.

On December 17, 2007, Loews Corporation announced a plan to spin off its entire ownership interest in Lorillard to holders of Carolina Group stock and Loews common stock.

In May 2017, Loews acquired Consolidated Container Company from Bain Capital for approximately $1.2 billion, entering the rigid plastic packaging business. The subsidiary rebranded as Altium Packaging in January 2020. In March 2021, Loews sold a 47 percent stake in Altium to GIC, Singapore's sovereign wealth fund, in a transaction that valued Altium at $2 billion.

== Subsidiaries ==
Loews Corporation's principal subsidiaries are:

- CNA Financial Corporation (89% owned) — one of the largest commercial property and casualty insurance companies in the United States. CNA reported record core income of $1.3 billion in 2024.
- Boardwalk Pipelines (100% owned) — operates approximately 14,000 miles of natural gas and natural gas liquids pipelines.
- Loews Hotels & Co (100% owned) — operates luxury hotels across the United States. In 2024, Loews Hotels opened the Loews Arlington Hotel and Convention Center, a 888-room property representing a $550 million investment.
- Altium Packaging (53% owned) — rigid plastic packaging manufacturer operating more than 60 facilities in the United States and Canada.

== Management ==
Founders Laurence and Robert Tisch served as co-CEOs until 1998 when they retired as part of a generational shift in corporate leadership. That year, James Tisch was named president and CEO, and the Office of the President was created with three members: James Tisch, Andrew Tisch, and Jonathan Tisch. In 2006, Jonathan Tisch and Andrew Tisch were elected co-chairmen of the board.

On July 29, 2024, Loews announced that James Tisch would retire as president and CEO effective December 31, 2024. The board elected Benjamin Tisch as his successor, making him the third generation of the Tisch family to lead the company. James Tisch became chairman of the board. The company has issued only a single class of common stock and all shareholders have equal voting rights.

== Governance ==
The current members of the board of directors of Loews Corporation include Charles D. Davidson, Paul J. Fribourg, Walter L. Harris, Jonathan C. Locker, Susan P. Peters, Dino Robusto, Alex Tisch (son of Andrew Tisch), Jennifer VanBelle, James S. Tisch (Chairman), and Ben Tisch (President & CEO). Andrew Tisch and Charles Diker are Directors Emeriti.

== Restatement ==
On February 13, 2003, the company restated its financial statements as of and for the years ended December 31, 2001 to 2000 as well as its interim financial statements for the first three quarters of 2002 to reflect an adjustment to the company's historical accounting for CNA's investment in life settlement contracts and the related revenue recognition. On March 19, 2003, the company announced a revision to its previously reported fourth-quarter and year-end 2002 results to reflect an additional $28.9 million of impairment losses on equity securities at the company's CNA Financial Corporation subsidiary. On February 16, 2006, the company restated results from 2001 through September 2005 to correct accounting for discontinued operations acquired in CNA's merger with the Continental Corp. in 1995. On March 8, 2006, the company said that financial statements for periods from 2001 to 2004 and the first three quarters of 2005 shouldn't be relied on because of accounting classification errors at its majority-owned subsidiary CNA Financial Corp, and it would restate financial statements for 2003 and 2004 and for the first three quarters of 2005 to correct the classification errors.
