= Financial history of the New York Giants =

The New York Giants, an American football team which plays in the National Football League (NFL), have had a long, and at times turbulent financial history. The Giants were founded in 1925 by businessman and bookmaker Tim Mara with an investment of 500 US$, and became one of the first teams in the then five-year-old NFL. Mara passed ownership of the team on to his sons Wellington and Jack after the 1929 Stock Market Crash to insulate the team from creditors. At first the Mara sons owned the team in name only, but they took increasingly larger roles in the organization beginning in the mid-1930s. Tim Mara remained involved in the team's operations until his death in 1959, when his sons assumed full control of the club. After Jack's passing in 1965, his son, Tim, took over his share of the team.

Although the Giants were successful on the field in their initial seasons, they struggled financially. A key event in franchise history occurred in the 11th game of the Giants inaugural season. The Chicago Bears, led by star running back Red Grange, came to town attracting a then pro football record 73,000 fans, and giving the Giants a much needed financial influx. The following year, Grange and his agent formed a rival league and stationed a competing team, led by Grange, in New York. Though the Giants lost $50,000 that season, the rival league folded and was subsumed into the NFL. After these initial struggles, the Giants financial status stabilized, and they led the league in attendance several times in the 1930s and 1940s. By the early 1960s, the Giants had firmly established themselves as one of the league's biggest attractions. However, rather than continue to receive their higher share of the league television revenue, the Mara sons pushed for equal sharing of revenue for the benefit of the entire league. Revenue sharing is still practiced in the NFL today, and is credited with strengthening the league.

After struggling in the latter half of the 1960s and the entire 1970s, the Giants hired an outsider, George Young, to run football operations for the first time in several decades. The Giants on-field product and business aspects improved rapidly following the hiring. In 1990, Jack Mara's son, Tim, who was struggling with cancer at the time, sold his half of the team to Bob Tisch. This marked the first time in franchise history the team had not been solely owned by the Mara family. In 2005, Wellington Mara, who had been with the team since its inception in 1925 when he worked as a ball boy, died. His death was followed two weeks later by the death of Tisch.

The Giants are currently owned by the sons of Wellington Mara and Bob Tisch—John K. Mara and Steve Tisch. Entering the 2024 NFL season, an estimate of the franchise's current value placed it at $10.1 billion.

== Early history and fiscal struggles: 1925–1929 ==
The Giants were founded in 1925 by Tim Mara, a bookmaker (legal in 1925), businessman, and promoter, with an investment of US$500 after a meeting with league president Joseph Carr, and Harry March. Carr was sent to the east coast to find someone to put a team in a major city there to help the struggling league. (No mention of Mr. Brickley...) Carr contacted Billy Gibson who was the manager of heavyweight boxer Gene Tunney and knew of Mara from Mara's interest in investing in Tunney. Mara decided to spend the $500 on the Giants as opposed to Tunney in a spur of the moment decision, and started the team with the statement, "an exclusive franchise for anything in New York is worth $500." His son Wellington later said that his father felt that even an empty store in the city was worth that price. Mara purchased the team, despite never having watched a single pro game, saying to the sellers at the time, "Just tell me one thing. Now that I have a franchise, what do I do with it." To differentiate themselves from the baseball team of the same name, they took the name "New York Football Giants", which they still use as their legal corporate name.

Mara soon realized that his purchase of the team did not yield any players, coaches, equipment, or a home field. March helped him establish the team by taking a job as the team's secretary and handling the personnel decisions, and Gibson served as the team's president. Mara's friends were wary of investing in the team, but he convinced Matty Frank, a real estate investor, and a few other people to invest. Mara rented the Polo Grounds as the team's stadium, and March developed a strategy that hinged on acquiring stars such as running back Jim Thorpe. At 37 years old, Thorpe was a shadow of his former self, and his contract required that he only play parts of games during the early parts of the season, until he got into shape. He played only the first regular season game however, before ending his Giants career due to injury. His absence would severely hurt the team's monetary outlook for the season.

Although the Giants were successful on the field in their first season, going 8–4 in 1925, their financial status was a different story. According to football historian Barry Gottehrer:

In the early days the NFL was strictly a low budget operation, and the Giants did little to strengthen it. Players earned less than $100 a game, schedules and franchises were subject to change from one day to the next, and Mara couldn't even give his tickets away.

Overshadowed by baseball, boxing, and college football, professional football was not a popular sport in 1925. Mara had to spend $25,000 of his own money during the season just to keep the franchise alive, and close friend and future New York state Governor Al Smith even implored him to sell the team. Mara needed $4,000 a game to cover his own outlays and $2,000 to $6,000, depending on the team, to pay the visitors to break even. He slashed ticket prices, and gave out over 5,000 free tickets a week. Although he used some moderately successful promotional gimmicks, such as having several players from the visiting Kansas City Cowboys dress up in his cowboy outfits and ride horses around New York City to promote that week's game, his struggle continued until the eleventh game of the season when Red Grange and the Chicago Bears came to town attracting over 73,000 fans—setting a pro football record. The game attracted such attention that 20,000 fans had to be turned away at the gates. This gave the Giants a much needed influx of revenue, and perhaps altered the history of the franchise. The team could have benefited even further, but Mara refused to raise ticket prices for the game.

The Giants went 8–4–1 in 1926, and withstood a challenge from an upstart American football league led by a team featuring Grange. Grange and his agent had formed the American Football League and placed their flagship team, the Yankees, in New York. According to a story by The New York Times published at the time, the Giants lost over $50,000 during the season. Grange's league lasted one season however, and was subsumed into the NFL. The Giants were so desperate to make money they allowed star Duluth Eskimos running back Ernie Nevers back into a close game after he was injured, even though by the rules they had the right to disallow his re-entrance, to please fans who had come to see him. The Yankees were subsumed into the NFL the next year and played most of their games on the road to avoid direct competition with the Giants. They folded in 1928, one year after Grange went back to playing for the Bears. The Giants paid a total of $21,000 in player salary in 1926, including paying all player expenses during the season, and player salaries ranged from $1,500 to $3,000. According to March, the attendance for the season was nearly equal to the 274,500 the team reported in their inaugural season. However, home attendance for games at the Polo Grounds dropped from 25,000 to 15,000 a game. The team's attendance on the road was significantly higher in their early history—the team averaged 57,000 in their three road games in 1925.

Mara replaced Gibson as the team's president before the 1927 season. He told March to spend whatever he felt necessary to build a championship caliber team. March overhauled the roster and the team finished 11–1–1, while winning its first NFL championship. They barely broke even financially however, and the team was still giving away as many as 4,000 tickets a game. Mara decided to reduce costs the following season, and instead of traveling first class, the Giants drove to games in a used bus, and stayed at local YMCAs instead of hotels. The team had to push the bus once for several miles when it broke down, and players had trouble sleeping at the Y. They won only four games, and Mara lost $40,000.

Before the 1929 season, Mara purchased the entire squad of the rival Detroit Wolverines, including star quarterback Benny Friedman, a team which had finished in third place the year before. The rosters of the two teams were combined under the Giants name and this led to immediate improvement as the Giants finished 13–1–1. Friedman's arrival in particular boosted tickets sales to an average of 25,000 a game, which more than covered the expense of his high salary ($10,000). The team made an $8,500 profit on the season.

== Wellington and Jack Mara take over: 1930–1963 ==
I guess the only reason I'm staying in this now is Jack and Wellington. You've seen them at the games. If the Giants ever amount to anything it's all theirs. I've still got the bookmaking and they'll have the Giants.

— Tim Mara in conversation to then head coach Doc Alexander in 1926.

After losing money in the 1929 stock market crash, Mara transferred ownership of the team over to his two sons in part to insulate the team from creditors. During the 1930 season, the team signed star Army halfback Red Cagle, who helped them at the box office. March later said, "When Red made his first appearance with the New York Giants, the additional attendance was enough to pay his salary [$7,500] for the remainder of the season and all of the next. His fame had filled the papers for three or four years and he helped receipts all over the circuit." Tim Mara called their 1930 home game versus Green Bay, where they made $60,000 aided by Cagle's debut, a "lifesaver". The Giants were projected gains of $20,000 in 1930, when they decided to hold a charity game for New York's homeless against some of Notre Dame's retired legends including the four horseman backfield from their 1924 team. The Giants won 22–0 in a game that raised $115,183 for the homeless, and is often credited with establishing the legitimacy of the professional game. Despite losing money on the Notre Dame game, and another exhibition to the Staten Island Stapletons, the Giants made a profit of $23,000 on the year.

In 1931 the team was struggling financially again after the retirement of Friedman. Tim Mara lamented not deducting expenses from the charity game versus Notre Dame, which had cost Mara a loss of around $15,000. Friedman returned around mid-season and his comeback boosted ticket sales. Mara also used promotions like a free ladies night game — which attracted 12,000 women — to increase interest in the team. The Giants made a profit of $31,000 in 1931. Friedman quit the team after the season when Mara denied him an ownership stake, telling him "I'm sorry...but the Giants are for my sons."

By 1932, Wellington began keeping track of college players by studying "dozens of out-of-town newspapers" every day, and kept a file of all the players—pro and college—that he liked for the team. He updated the file every night, and by that year had begun giving his father lists of what he considered the best college players. After that season, he gave his father another list and suggested they draft more collegians as he felt the team was aging rapidly. When the New York Post became aware of this they published the following mocking poem:

Papa, please buy me a tackle.

I'd like a big halfback, too.
I'd like old Green Bay to schackle.

Maybe Angelo Brovelli would do.

Before the next season Tim Mara signed All-American University of Michigan quarterback Harry Newman, and free agent halfback Ken Strong. Mara broke his own rule by offering Newman a contract which allowed him a percentage of the gate. That same season Wellington Mara's mother finally allowed him to spend training camp living with the team. When he inadvertently received a black eye while he was helping the team with their punting drills, his father had to talk his mother out of making him come back home.

The 1934 NFL Championship Game, dubbed the "Sneakers Game" because the Giants donned sneakers at halftime to get better traction, resulted in a 30–13 win on the field for the team but an even more important victory in the box office. Tickets for the game sold so fast that Mara decided to add 6,000 temporary seats on the sidelines and in other portions of the stadium, which resulted in the team taking in $64,504 from that game alone.

=== Wellington becomes secretary: 1935–1944 ===
My Brother Jack's president and treasurer, my Pop's chairman of the board, and I'm secretary. Pop and Jack worry about the tickets. Mom and I worry about the team.

— Wellington Mara breaking down the family's various business roles in the late 1930s.

By 1935 Jack Mara had received a degree from Fordham Law School, passed the bar, and was, at age 27, the team's president. By that same year, 19‑year‑old Wellington had become the team's secretary, and he started to exert influence over personnel decisions. Newman retired before the 1935 season rather than come back from a back injury suffered the previous year when the team refused to give him a raise. This left Strong as the team's top draw, and the Giants signed him to a contract which guaranteed him $4,000 but gave him a percentage of the draw that could make his salary reach a maximum of $6,000 depending on attendance. At midseason the team's attendance had increased by 15% from the previous year's record ticket sales. Although Strong was paid well that season, and took advantage of high ticket sales from games in which he was injured, many of the other team's players were not. "I felt pretty damn good," Strong later said about his salary, "but guys like Hein, Morgan, and Burnett weren't making much more than a hundred dollars a game. The salaries the front office fed to the newspapers weren't exactly true. We had three All-Stars on the Giants making less money than most of the bench warmers on the Dodgers. Hein was the greatest player the Giants ever had, but he didn't start making $5,000 until after his 12th season." Hein remarked that he felt he was well paid for the time however, "I think at the time $150 [his salary in 1931] was probably the highest pay of any lineman in the league. It was pretty good money, even though it wouldn't sound that way now, but you could buy a loaf of bread for a nickel and get a full meal for thirty-five cents in the Automat back then. And you had no income tax."

Wellington was a fan of George Washington University's Alphonse "Tuffy" Leemans, and one of the first major personnel decisions he made was selecting the obscure running back in the second round of the NFL's first draft in 1936. The draft helped reduce player salaries as a drafted player could no longer negotiate with other teams. The Maras were fans of the reduced payouts. "We found out that it didn't work to pay one star eight hundred dollars a game and the rest about one hundred," said Tim Mara. "The majority of players resented it and their resentment showed in their play." The Giants began to standardize pay, which they felt avoided player jealousy. The team paid all of their backs $150 a game, and all of their lineman $100 a game in 1936, while Danowski, their quarterback, made $350 a contest. Strong was asked to take a pay cut from $6,000 a season to $3,200, but he left for the new American Football League instead. The team finished in the black in 1936.

In 1939 and 1940, the Giants led the league in attendance, with 233,440 in six home games in 1939, and 247,646 over seven home games in 1940. They also had the league's two biggest turnouts in 1939 in their games against the Washington Redskins (62,543) and Bears (58,693). In 1940, their game against the Brooklyn Dodgers, drew 54,997 on December 1 at the Polo Grounds, which was also the league high for that season. In 1943, the Giants led the league in attendance again with 245,398 for six games, and had the league's highest single game attendance for their game versus the Bears with 56,691.

=== Post World War II era and beyond: 1945–1963 ===
By 1946, Tim Mara had given over complete control of the team to his sons. Jack, the older son, controlled the business aspects, while Wellington concentrated on the on-field operations. In that same year, NBC televised the Giants game versus the Green Bay Packers on September 20—the first non-experimental televised game in league history. In 1953, John Mara stated that he felt television was actually harmful to the Giants financial prospects. In court testimony at the government's anti-trust case against the NFL, Mara called for what he termed a "full-house guarantee", stating that unless all home game were guaranteed to be sold out, they should not be televised within a 75-mile (121 km) radius of New York City. The Giants had made $49,000 in gate revenue, $50,000 in radio receipts, and $108,000 in television receipts in 1952.

Although the Giants were no longer the league's top draw by 1955, falling to ninth in attendance and being one of three teams which had decreased attendance compared to the previous season, the Maras were still financially secure enough to turn down an offer of one million dollars for the team. NFL commissioner Bert Bell had personally made the offer on behalf of an unidentified group of investors, and accorded to Bell the Maras responded, "[f]ootball is our business and we intend to remain in it." The offer was the largest for a franchise in pro football up to that point. The investment group was reportedly enticed by the team's potential television revenue—at the time the Giants "television-radio" income led the league at $150,000 annually—and the 8,000,000 population of New York City from which it could draw. Despite the size of the offer, John Mara considered the figure low, and stated that he had "no idea" who was in the group attempting to buy the team.

Before the 1956 season, the Giants, who had previously been renting the Polo Grounds from baseball's Giants at a rate of $75,000 a year, began playing their home games at Yankee Stadium. The Giants run of championship game appearances in their late 1950s and early 1960s combined with their large market location translated into financial success. In 1958 they set a new home attendance record when 71,163 fans attended their November 8 game against Baltimore. And in 1959 they established their next four highest home game totals by drawing between 66,000 and 68,000 fans for games versus the Eagles, Packers, Browns, and Steelers. By the early 1960s, the Giants were receiving $175,000 a game under the NFL's television contract with CBS—four times as much as small-market Green Bay, which was one of the most successful teams of the era. However, in the league's new contract, the Maras convinced the other owners that it would be in the best interest of the NFL to share television revenue equally, a practice which is still current, and is credited with strengthening the NFL. The Giants and professional football as a whole, were helped financially by their contest versus the Baltimore Colts in the 1958 NFL Championship game. The televised game became the first professional football game to go into overtime, and is credited with increasing the popularity of the NFL in the US. The explosion in interest in pro football was evidenced in the Giants financials: in 1956 they had less than 8,000 season ticket holders and by 1963 that number had increased to over 50,000. They sold out every home game in 1962 and 1963. Additionally, while scalpers hardly existed in 1956, by 1963 they regularly received $25 for a $5 ticket.

The Giants captivated New York. Before the 1962 NFL championship game versus the Packers, 10,000 fans at a New York Knicks game spontaneously began chanting "Beat Green Bay! Beat Green Bay!", and when the 18,000 tickets available to non season ticket holders went on sale for the game, they sold within three hours. Fans made reservations for motels in Pennsylvania, New Jersey, and Connecticut so they could watch the game out of the 75 mile blackout zone, and even though the game was played in single digit weather with 35 mph winds, only 299 fans who bought tickets stayed home.

== Wilderness years: 1964–1978 ==
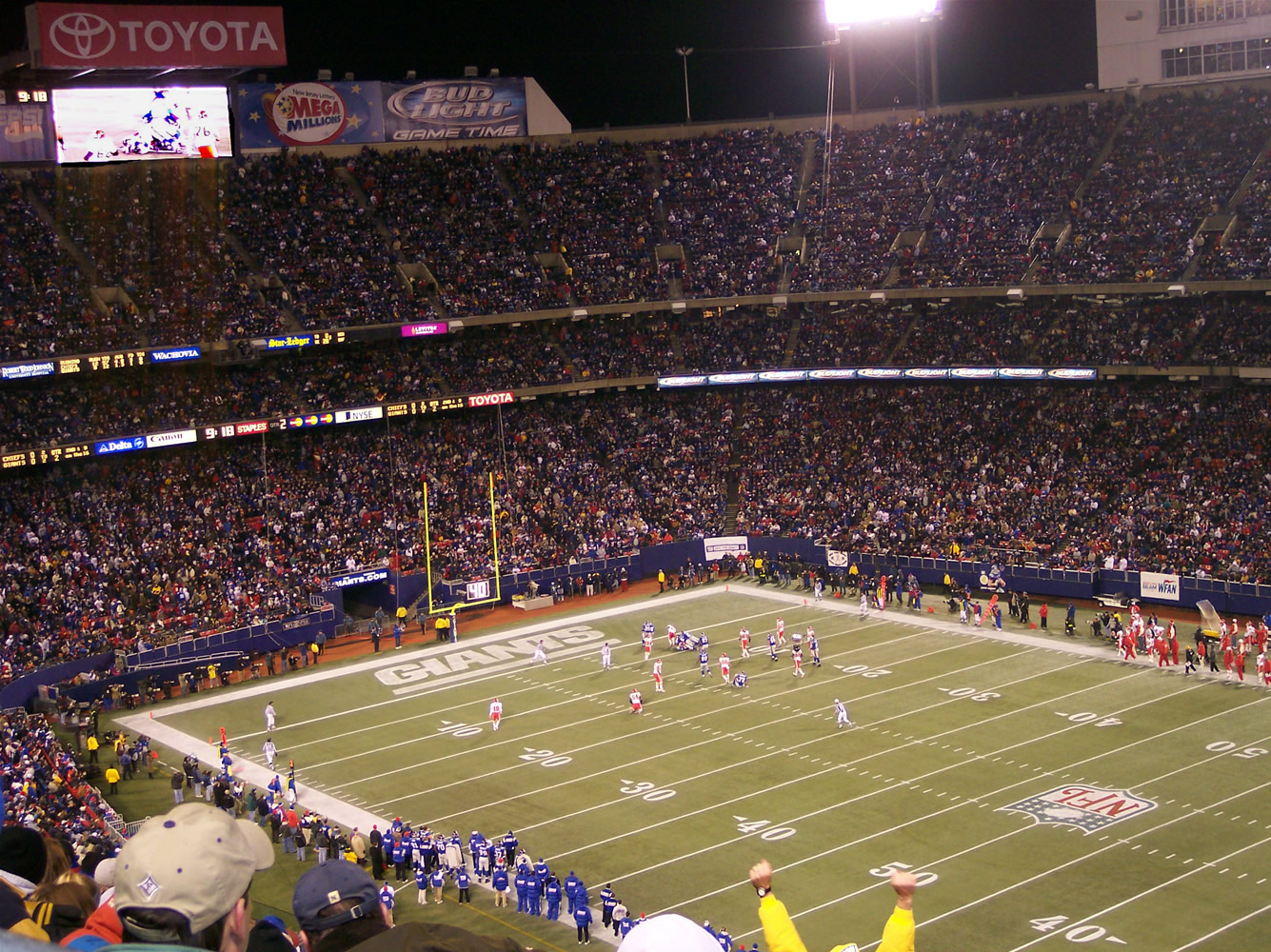
Giants Stadium was home to the Giants from 1976 to 2009. Its construction cost $78 million and it sat 80,242.

After advancing to the league championship game in five out of the past six seasons, the Giants financial outlook was bright heading into the 1964 season. The team even went so far as to book movie theaters where fans could watch the team's games for six dollars. However, the team struggled mightily, finishing 2–10–2 in 1964, beginning an 18-season playoff drought. This period in team history is often referred to as "the wilderness years". In 1965, Jack Mara died, leaving his 50% share in the team to his son Tim.

While Wellington and Jack had a solid relationship, Tim and Wellington frequently clashed. "Wellington Mara lives the spiritual life." Former Giant Frank Gifford later recalled. "I never heard him utter a swear word. He goes to mass almost every day and has put all eleven of his children through catholic colleges. That's Well's life: his family, his church, and his Giants." Tim, however, had two ex-wives and lived a more outgoing, laid back lifestyle.

Wellington fought the AFL-NFL merger that took place in the 1966 season, and as a result, the league gave him $10 million to allow another team, the Jets, into the city as an NFL team. The money was paid out in yearly installments of $500,000. In 1971, Pete Axthelm, writing in New York magazine, said that "a conservative estimate of Wellington Mara's profit would begin at $1 million." The writer said that the Maras were known to treat positive reporters well and mistreat negative ones, sometimes by giving them unfavorable seats and on some occasions by supposedly calling their sports editors to request they no long cover the team.

Desiring their own home stadium, in the early 1970s the Giants reached an agreement with the New Jersey Sports and Exposition Authority to play their home games at a brand-new, state-of-the-art, dedicated football stadium. Some New Yorkers were furious and Mayor John Lindsay had attempted to keep the team in the city by proposing to buy Yankee Stadium and renovate it at a cost of $24 million. Lindsay estimated that they brought $3 million to the city, and was anxious to keep that revenue, as well as satisfy New York Giants fans. Axthlem characterized the Giants fan base at the time as mostly "white, suburban and fairly well to do, and its members drive cars to football games." The battle became nasty with members of the New York City side claiming that the Maras "complained of how inconvenient it was for them to park, or for them to get out to the neighborhood." They claimed the Maras "never really negotiated. They just listened...I think they were afraid if they asked for something, we might give it to them—and they wanted to keep us from offering a deal that they couldn't turn down." In fact, the Maras had already made the agreement to move out of the city, even though Wellington was still placating the city. He felt this was a factor in the Maras' decision to move the stadium, as the attendees could drive to their New Jersey stadium as opposed to traveling through the Bronx to Yankee Stadium. The new stadium, which would become known as Giants Stadium, was to be built at a brand new sports complex in East Rutherford, New Jersey. The decision met with outrage from some New Yorkers, and the city's mayor John Lindsay sought legal action to prevent the team from playing in Yankee Stadium — or anywhere else in New York — and demanded a congressional investigation into the deal.

As the complex was being built, and their current home at Yankee Stadium was being renovated, they would be without a home for three years. Their final full season at Yankee Stadium was 1972. After playing their first two games there in 1973, the Giants played the rest of their home games in 1973, as well as all of their home games in 1974, at the Yale Bowl in New Haven, Connecticut. This was done primarily out of a desire to have their own home field, as opposed to having to share Shea Stadium with the Jets. Initially the NFL had a blackout policy which prevented them from playing in Connecticut, but congress passed legislation, later signed by Richard Nixon, that changed the blackout rule. However, between access problems, neighborhood issues, the fact that the Yale Bowl was not ideally suited for pro football (the stadium did not have lights, nor does it have lights today), the age of the stadium (it was built in 1914), and the lack of modern amenities, the Giants reconsidered their decision when their stadium was not completed on schedule in time for the 1975 season. Construction was delayed a year because of construction delays, cost overruns, seven lawsuits by various groups, and political haggling — New York's Governor attempted to block the team's move, and the incumbent Democratic New Jersey Governor and his republican challenger argued over the stadium. They ultimately agreed to share Shea Stadium with the Jets for the 1975 season. The Giants left Yale Bowl after losing all seven home games played at Yale in the 1974 season and compiling a home record of 1–11 over that two-year stretch.

Giants Stadium opened in 1976 to a sellout crowd. The stadium cost $78 million to build, and had a capacity of 80,242. The Giants led the league in home attendance in 1978, drawing 604,800 in their eight games. However, one of the low points in team history occurred during the season: the so-called "Miracle at the Meadowlands". With the Giants needing only to kneel the ball to secure a certain victory against the Philadelphia Eagles, they chose to call a running play—which resulted in a fumble that was returned for a game-winning touchdown by the Eagles. Two games later, angry Giants fans burned tickets in the parking lot. Protests continued throughout the remainder of the season, reaching a crescendo in the final home game. A group of fans hired a small plane to fly over the stadium on game day carrying a banner that read: "15 years of lousy football ... we've had enough." The game had 24,374 no-shows, and fans hanged an effigy of Wellington Mara in the Stadium parking lot.

== Modern history: 1979–present ==
The Giants made the decision to hire a General Manager for the first time in team history following the 1978 season. However, disagreements during the search caused severe friction and discord between Wellington and Tim Mara. At one point they had tried to hire Jan Van Duser, a league executive, but he declined the offer due to the ownership squabbles. Finally, the Maras asked NFL Commissioner Pete Rozelle to step in with a recommendation. Rozelle discussed the hiring with former Giants Frank Gifford and Tom Scott, who recommended hiring George Young, who worked in personnel for the Miami Dolphins and had been an assistant coach for the Baltimore Colts. They had already recommended Young to Wellington and his son John who both liked the choice. But felt if Rozelle presented the recommendation as his own idea Wellington and Tim would be more likely to accept the pick, as relations were so bad that any idea that came from one side was immediately rejected by the other. Rozelle recommended Young, he was hired, and was instrumental in turning around the fortunes of the franchise. "Oh, there is no question he helped save the franchise," John Mara said. "It looked like a no-win situation. He came in and overhauled everything we did in a more professional way." Despite the hiring and subsequent success, the rift between the Maras lasted for several years and, at one point a partition had to be put between the two in the owner's box.

Following the 1983 season, the Giants were involved in a fight for the services of star linebacker Lawrence Taylor—who the team had drafted number two overall in the 1981 NFL draft—with the New Jersey Generals of the USFL and the Giants. Taylor had been given a $1 million interest-free, 25-year loan by the Generals' owner Donald Trump on December 14, 1983, with the provision that he would begin playing in the USFL in 1988. Taylor quickly regretted the decision and less than a month later attempted to get out of the agreement. The Giants, who were eager to keep Taylor, took part in attempting to free Taylor from it. The results of this tussle included many considerations but the ultimate result was threefold: Taylor had to return the $1 million to Trump; the Giants were required to pay Trump $750,000 over the next five seasons in order for Trump to release Taylor's rights; and Taylor was given a new six-year $6.2-million contract by the Giants. With Taylor retained, the Giants won two Super Bowls; in 1986, led by Taylor, who won the league's Most Valuable Player award, they defeated the Denver Broncos in Super Bowl XXI, and in 1990, they defeated the Buffalo Bills in Super Bowl XXV. The decision to put football matters in the hands of Young was a key factor in those victories; 19 of the 22 Giants starters in Super Bowl XXI, plus the team's kicker and punter, were acquired after Young took over as GM.

Giants estimated value from 1998 to 2006 according to Forbes magazine.

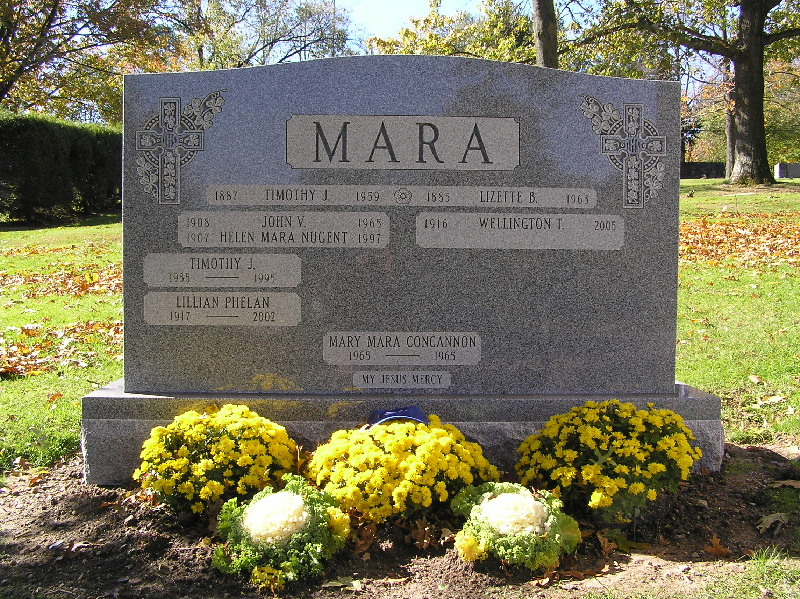
The Mara family gravesite

The 1990 season and Super Bowl win marked the end of an era for the Giants. Shortly after the win, defensive coordinator Bill Belichick left to become head coach of the Cleveland Browns, and Parcells decided in the spring of 1991 to leave the Giants for a career in broadcasting. There was also an ownership change in what had been one of the most stable front offices in professional sports. In February 1991, after being diagnosed with Cancer, Tim Mara sold his 50% interest in the team to Bob Tisch for a reported $80 million. The sale was actually worked out before the Super Bowl but not announced until afterwards, so as to avoid distracting the team. It marked the first time since their inception in 1925 that the Giants had not been wholly owned and controlled by the Mara family.

Tisch was technically the team's co-chief executive at first, however given his lack of football knowledge he chose to defer to Wellington Mara on football decisions in his initial seasons with the club. Although he later took a more active role in making decisions related to the football side of the team, in general, Tisch concentrated on the financial aspects, while Mara focused on the on-field product. After leading the league in attendance in 2001, the Giants finished second to Washington from 2002 to 2005.

On October 25, 2005, Giants patriarch Wellington Mara died after a brief illness, at the age of 89. Mara had been involved with the Giants since he was nine years old, when he was a ball boy for the team. Mara was universally beloved by the players. Hall of Fame linebacker Harry Carson, who played during some of the team's down years in the 1970s, never became angry at Mara despite being frustrated with the team's performances. "The Giants’ organization cares about its players more than most teams in the NFL. This stems from the top. The Maras are family men and Wellington, especially, has sought to cultivate a family atmosphere in the team.... If any NFL owner deserves a championship, it is Mara." According to Parcells, Wellington made an effort to get to know each of his players. "The Giants are Wellington Mara's whole life, they have been his whole life. He's at the office every day, he's at practice very day, he loves hanging around the locker room and getting to know the players." Despite his strong religious convictions, he put aside his personal beliefs, and avoided preaching to players who were having problems. "Nobody did more for me than Wellington Mara." Lawrence Taylor said. "He didn't have to save me, he didn't have to keep helping me to find help.... And he never lectured me. I could tell he disapproved but he never lectured me." Several players went to Mara's bedside as he was dying to say goodbye to the owner. The team dedicated their next game to Mara, and shut out the Redskins 36–0.

Just twenty days after Mara's death, on November 15, 2005, Tisch died at the age of 79. He was diagnosed in 2004 with inoperable brain cancer. Tisch was a philanthropist all his life and donated considerable sums of money to charitable causes. After his diagnosis, he donated money to institutions aimed towards the research of drugs and treatments to control brain tumors.

In 2010, the New Meadowlands Stadium opened, replacing Giants Stadium. The new stadium is a 50/50 partnership between the Giants and Jets, and while the stadium is owned by the New Jersey Sports and Exposition Authority on paper, the two teams jointly built the stadium using private funds, and administer it jointly through New Meadowlands Stadium Corporation. The Giants had previously planned a $300-million renovation to the Meadowlands, before deciding in favor of the new stadium which was originally estimated to cost approximately $600 million, before rising to an estimated cost of $1.2 billion. One advantage gained by owning the stadium is that the teams saved considerable money in tax payments, leasing the land from the state at a cost of $6.3 million per year. The state paid for all utilities, including the $30 million needed to install them. Both teams received $150 million loans from the NFL to pay for construction of the stadium. Representatives from the league's teams voted 30–2 in favor of the loan.

The Giants are currently owned and operated by John K. Mara and Steve Tisch—the sons of Wellington Mara and Bob Tisch. Mara had run the day-to-day operations under Bob Tisch's supervision in the years leading up to his father's death. Forbes magazine estimated the 2010 value of the team at $1.183 billion. This ranks them fourth in the 30 team league in terms of value. The value has steadily increased from $288 million in 1998, to the current value. The magazine estimated their revenue in 2004 at $175 million, of which $43 million came from gate receipts. Operating revenue was $26.7 million, and player salary was $97 million. The team finished second to the Redskins in the NFL in attendance in 2006, 2007, and 2008, drawing 628,910, 629,848, and 632,554 respectively. They fell to third behind the Cowboys and Redskins in 2009 with 629,615.

As of 2010, major sponsors include Gatorade, Anheuser Busch, Toyota, Timex, and Verizon Wireless. Recent former sponsors include Miller Brewing and North Fork Bank. Game day concessions are provided by Aramark, and the Giants average ticket price is $90. Prior to the 2024 season, the Giants were listed by Forbes as the fourth most profitable NFL team with a value of $7.3 billion.

== See also ==
- Forbes list of the most valuable NFL teams
- New York Giants seasons
- Logos and uniforms of the New York Giants
- List of New York Giants players

== Sources ==
- Axthelm, Pete. "The Giants go to Jersey, or, Father Mara knows best." New York, New York Media, LLC Vol. 4, No. 44 November 1, 1971 issue, ISSN 0028-7369 (available online)
- Carroll, John Martin. Grange and the Rise of Modern Football, Urbana: University of Illinois Press, 1999 ISBN 0-252-07166-2
- Eskenazi, Gerald. There Were Giants in Those Days. New York: Grosset & Dunlap 1976 ISBN 0-448-12451-3
- Eskenazi, Gerald. A Sports-Writer's Life: From the Desk of a New York Times Reporter. Columbia: University of Missouri Press. 2004 ISBN 0-8262-1510-6
- Fullerton, John. Screen Culture: History and Textuality. London: Indiana University Press, 2004 ISBN 0-86196-645-7
- Gottehrer, Barry. The Giants of New York, the history of professional football's most fabulous dynasty. New York, G. P. Putnam's Sons, 1963 OCLC 1356301
- Neft, David S., Cohen, Richard M., and Korch, Rick. The Complete History of Professional Football from 1892 to the Present. New York: St. Martin's Press, 1994 ISBN 0-312-11435-4
- Pervin, Lawrence A. Football's New York Giants: A History. McFarland 2009 ISBN 0-7864-4268-9
- Schwartz, John. Tales from the New York Giants Sideline. Champaign: Sports Publishing LLC, 2004 ISBN 1-58261-758-9
- Sprechman, Jordan and Shannon, Bill. This Day in New York Sports. Illinois: Sports Publishing LLC. 1998 ISBN 1-57167-254-0
- Tisch, Jonathon and Weber, Karl. The Power of We: Succeeding Through Partnerships. Hoboken: John Wiley and Sons, 2004 ISBN 0-471-65282-2
- Watterson, John Sayle. College Football: history, spectacle, controversy. Baltimore: Johns Hopkins University Press, 2000 ISBN 0-8018-7114-X
- Whittingham, Richard. What Giants They Were. Chicago: Triumph Books 2000 ISBN 1-57243-368-X
