= Mara family =

Family owning the New York Giants

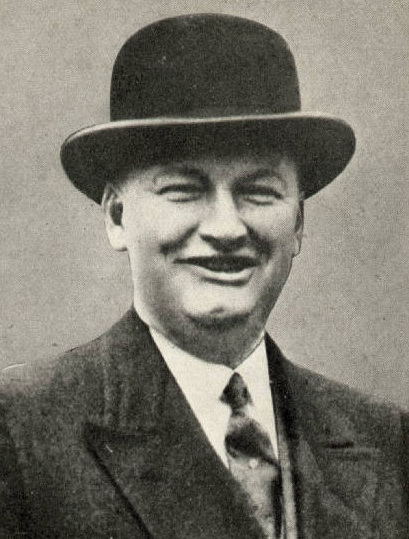
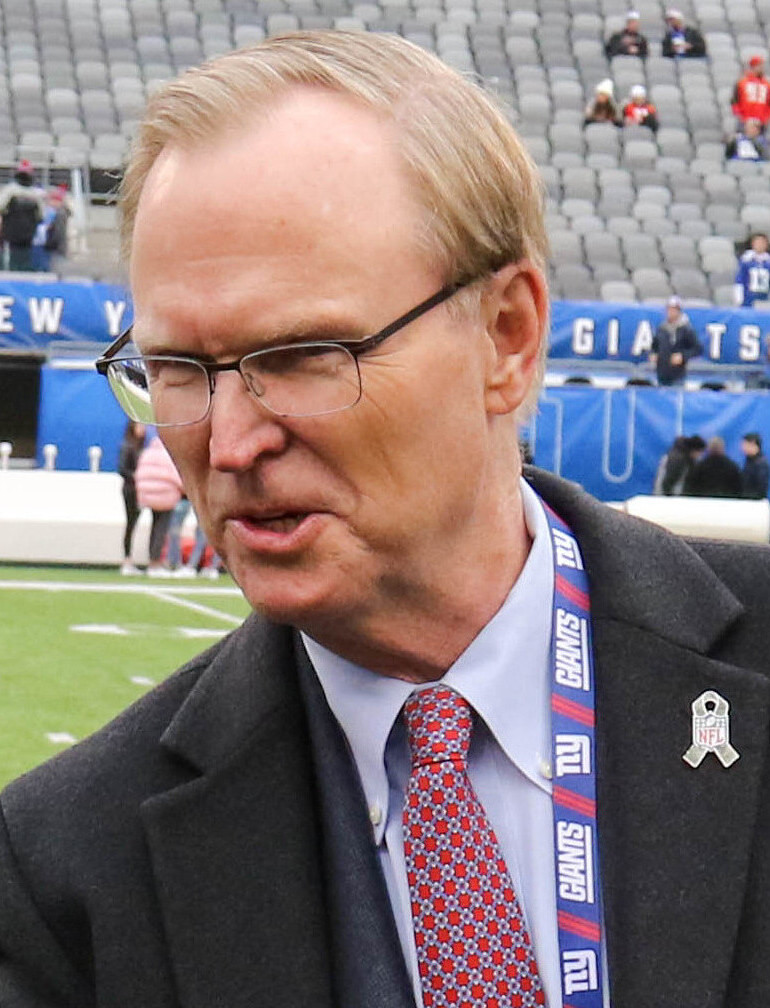
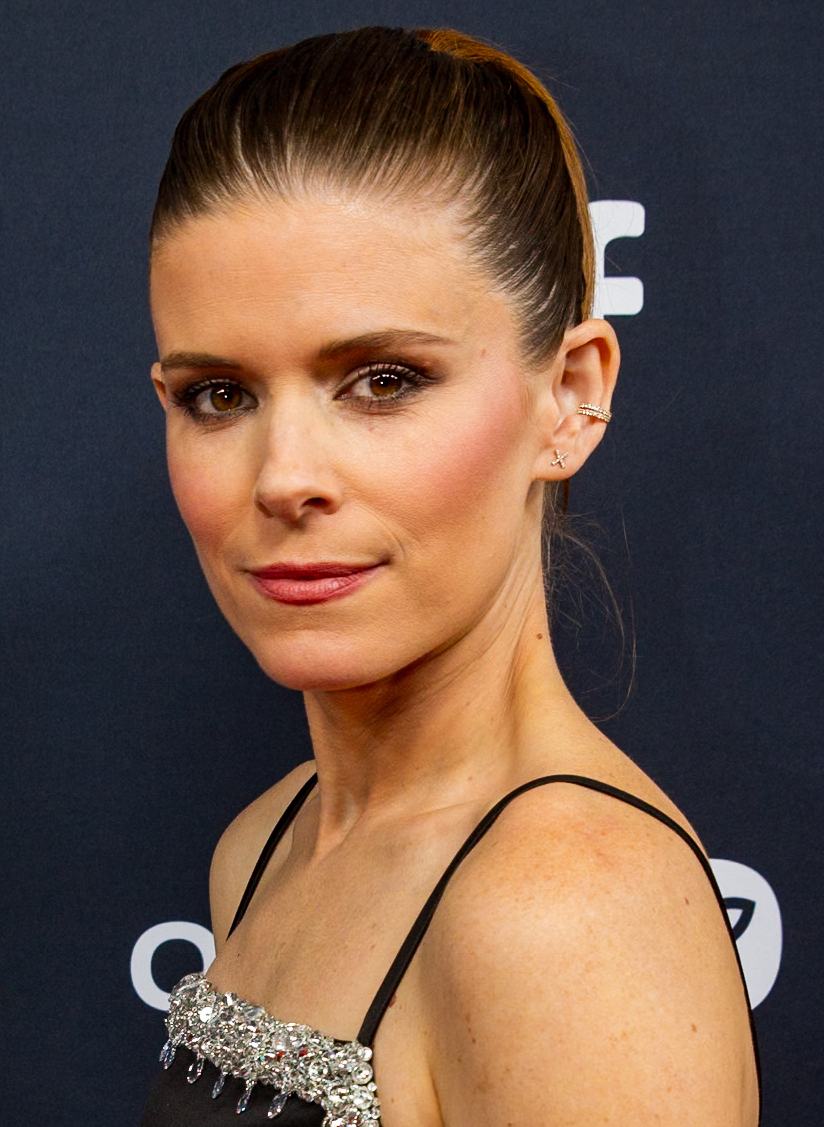
- Tim Mara John Mara Kate Mara
- Current region: New York City, New York; U.S.
- Origin: County Tipperary, Ireland
- Founder: Tim Mara
- Current head: John Mara
- Connected families: Rooney family

The Mara family is an Irish-American family primarily known for owning the New York Giants of the National Football League (NFL) since the franchise was formed in 1925. The Maras owned the team outright until 1991, when a feud led to one side of the family selling their half interest to Preston Robert Tisch.

== Tim Mara ==
Family patriarch Tim Mara was born in 1887 in New York City to John and Elizabeth (née Harris) Mara. While working as a newsboy, Mara also earned money as a courier for bookmakers. He eventually started his own bookmaking operation and in 1921 became the legal in-track bookmaker at Belmont Park.

Mara was married to Elizabeth "Lisett" Barclay for over 50 years. They had two sons: Jack Mara and Wellington Mara.

In 1925, Mara was awarded New York City's National Football League franchise. In 1930, he transferred half of the ownership to each of his sons to protect the team from creditors, but maintained control of the franchise until his death on February 16, 1959.

== Jack Mara ==
Jack Mara was born in 1908. He graduated from Fordham University in 1933 with a law degree. He never became a practicing lawyer, instead joining the Giants as team president. As president, Mara focused on the team's business operations.

In 1934, he married Helen Phelan, daughter of New York State Athletic Commission chairman John J. Phelan. They had two children: Maura and Timothy J. Mara.

Jack Mara died on June 29, 1965. After his death, his 50% share of the team was divided between his wife and two children. Helen Mara later married Joseph C. Nugent. She died on February 21, 1997, at the age of 89.

Maura Mara was described as "probably the most rabid in the family" by her cousin John Mara. She married Richard J. Concannon, a senior partner at Kelley Drye & Warren, and had three children. Her 49-year marriage ended with Concannon's death in 2013.

== Wellington Mara ==
Wellington Mara was born in 1916. He started as the team's waterboy and after graduating from Fordham University joined the Giants as team treasurer and head of football operations. After his brother's death in 1965, he assumed the role of president. Mara was heavily involved in league affairs. He was instrumental in creating revenue sharing that saw all teams split profits from television contracts and helped engineer the merger of the NFL and American Football League. He remained team president until his death on October 25, 2005. Wellington was named after the Duke of Wellington. From 1941, when his father hired Wilson as the exclusive supplier of NFL game balls, until 1969, game balls were branded with his nickname, "The Duke". After Wellington's death, the nickname was branded on the balls again starting in the 2006 season.

== Feud and sale of 50% of the team to the Tisch family ==
Timothy J. Mara represented the interests of his mother and sister after the death of Jack, his father. He joined the club in 1964 as vice president and treasurer. In 1973, amid a string of losing seasons, Mara suggested that the club hire Andy Robustelli to oversee football operations. In the early 1970s, he oversaw the construction of Giants Stadium, which opened in 1976.

In 1976, Tim and Wellington Mara had their first major disagreement: Wellington wanted to sign Larry Csonka and Tim did not. The two later clashed over the hiring of assistant director of operations Terry Bledsoe, as Tim believed that Bledsoe would be a puppet for his uncle.

By the end of the 1978 season, the Giants had won only 74 of their last 212 games. On December 18, 1978, Robustelli resigned as director of operations and Tim and Wellington Mara could not agree on a successor. Wellington wanted to promote Bledsoe while Tim wanted to hire Dallas Cowboys personnel director Gil Brandt or Los Angeles Rams general manager Don Klosterman. After a 45-day stalemate, Commissioner Pete Rozelle intervened and a compromise candidate, Jan Van Duser, was chosen. However, Van Duser did not want the job. Thirteen days later, a second compromise candidate was agreed on and George Young was named general manager of the Giants. Under Young's management, the Giants won Super Bowls Super Bowl XXI and Super Bowl XXV.

After their public dispute, Wellington and Tim Mara stopped talking to each other and the owner's box at Giants Stadium was divided by a partition. Neither side of the family had enough money to buy out the other one. In 1991, Tim Mara, Helen Mara Nugent, and Maura Mara Concannon sold their shares in the club to Preston Robert Tisch for $70 million.

== Children of Wellington Mara ==
Wellington Mara and his wife Ann Mara had 11 children. They are:

- John Mara, president and CEO of the Giants.
- Susan (Mara) McDonnell, a realtor and a member of the Giants board of directors.
- Chris Mara, Giants' senior vice president of player personnel, married Kathleen Rooney, a member of the family that owns the Pittsburgh Steelers. They are the parents of actresses Kate Mara and Rooney Mara.
- Stephen Mara, works in the financial-services business.
- Frank Mara, Giants' vice president of community relations.
- Sheila Mara
- Kathy (Mara) Morehouse
- Maureen (Mara) Brown, wife of former National Hockey League player Doug Brown and mother of NHL player Patrick Brown
- Ann Mara Cacase
- Meghan (Mara) Brennan
- Colleen (Mara) McLane
