= Rooney family =

Family involved in sports business activities

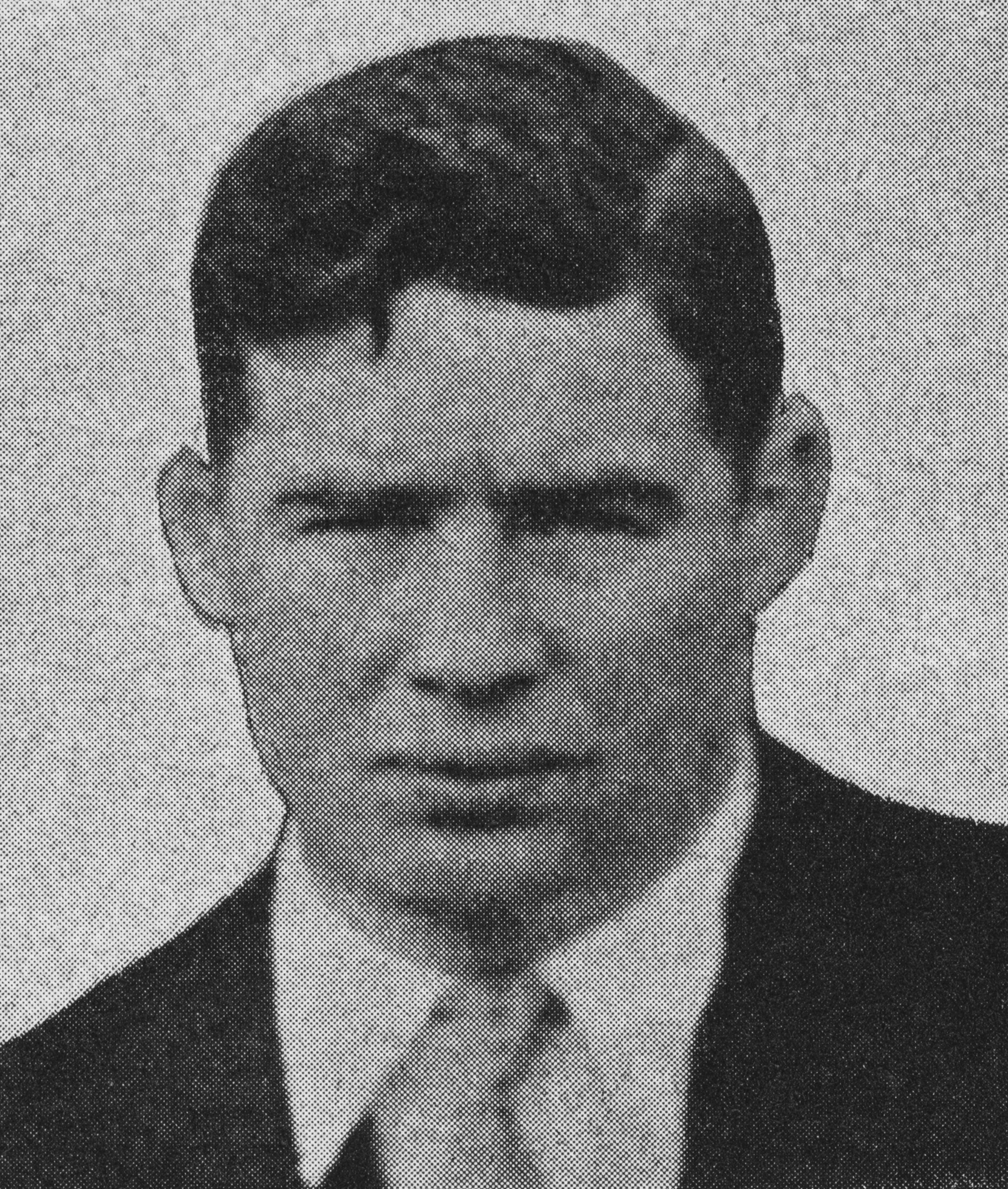
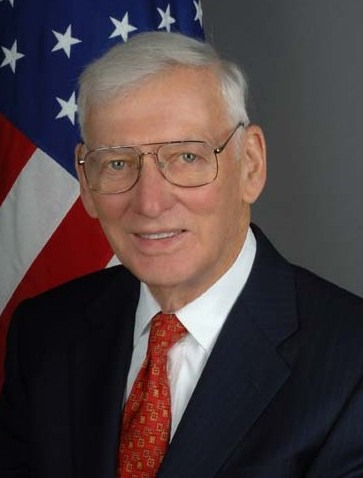
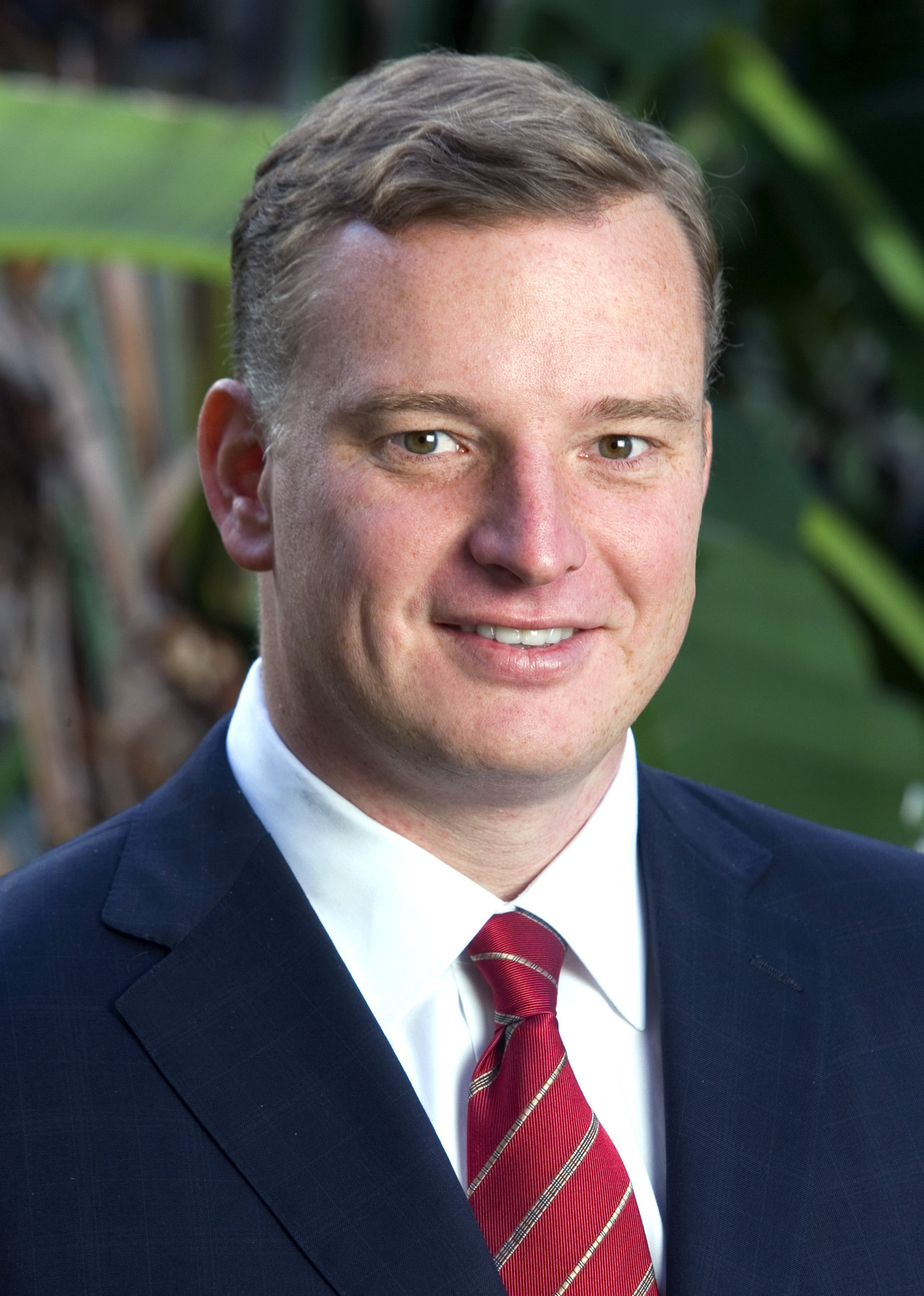
- Art Rooney Dan M. Rooney Tom Rooney
- Current region: Pittsburgh, Pennsylvania, U.S.
- Origin: County Down, Northern Ireland
- Founder: James Rooney
- Connected families: Mara family

The Rooney family is an Irish-American family known for its connections to the sports, acting, and political fields. After emigrating from Ireland in the 1840s, it established its American roots in Pittsburgh, Pennsylvania in the 1880s.

The Rooneys are primarily known for having been the majority owners and operators of the Pittsburgh Steelers of the National Football League (NFL) since the formation of the franchise in 1933. Art Rooney was the founder and owner of the team, from its establishment as a semi-independent team in the Western Pennsylvania Professional Football Circuit in 1921 until his death in 1988. Art's brother James, who later served as a Pennsylvania state representative, played for the team in the 1920s; their brother Silas entered the priesthood but remained involved in football by becoming athletic director at St. Bonaventure University (which for a time in the 1950s hosted the Steelers' training camp). Following Art's death, ownership of the franchise transferred to Art's oldest son, Dan Rooney, a former United States Ambassador to Ireland. Front office operations have passed from Dan Rooney to his son and current team president, Art Rooney II, in 2017 upon the death of Dan Rooney.

The family members who have had the most influence in the Steelers organization are:

- Art Rooney: team founder
- Dan Rooney: former team chairman
- Art Rooney Jr.: current vice president and former personnel director
- Art Rooney II: current team president and representative at owners meetings

== Steelers ownership ==
The Rooneys have been credited for much of the team's success. The fundamental approach of the Rooneys to managing the franchise has largely been through patience and consistency, both of which the ownership is renowned for. An example of the team's stability is that there were only three head coaches employed from 1969 to 2025, the fewest for any team in American professional sports during that time frame, with all three coaches leaving on their own accord and none having officially been fired. This approach has proven to be rewarding, given that the Steelers have won six Super Bowls in the post AFL–NFL merger era – with all three coaches (Chuck Noll, Bill Cowher, and Mike Tomlin) having won at least one Super Bowl and two AFC championships apiece – and the team being a playoff contender in most years.

Dan Rooney's influence as chairman of the league's diversity committee made it a requirement for any team seeking a new head coach to include an interview with at least one ethnic minority candidate during that process. For this reason, the practice has become known as the "Rooney Rule".

Howard Cosell on the Rooneys

The Rooneys are the finest people, the people I most respect in American sports ownership. I've always felt that way. And there's no reason to change. They are people of integrity and character. The way they put the Steelers together, to hire a man like Chuck Noll, to emphasize the team concept. I have a whole transcendental feeling for the Steelers and the Rooneys and Pittsburgh.

— Howard Cosell, October 1982

== Mara connection ==
The Rooneys are also related to the Mara family, part-owners and founders of the New York Giants. The Mara family name used to be O'Mara and their Rooney family ancestors originate in Newry, County Down.

Actresses Kate Mara and Rooney Mara are the daughters of Timothy Christopher Mara, the vice president of player evaluation for the New York Giants, and Kathleen McNulty (née Rooney). Their paternal grandfather, Wellington Mara, was the long-time co-owner of the Giants, succeeded by their uncle, John Mara. Their maternal grandfather, Timothy James "Tim" Rooney, has run Yonkers Raceway in Yonkers, New York since 1972. The Mara sisters are the great-granddaughters of both New York Giants founder Tim Mara and Pittsburgh Steelers founder Art Rooney.

== Notable family members ==
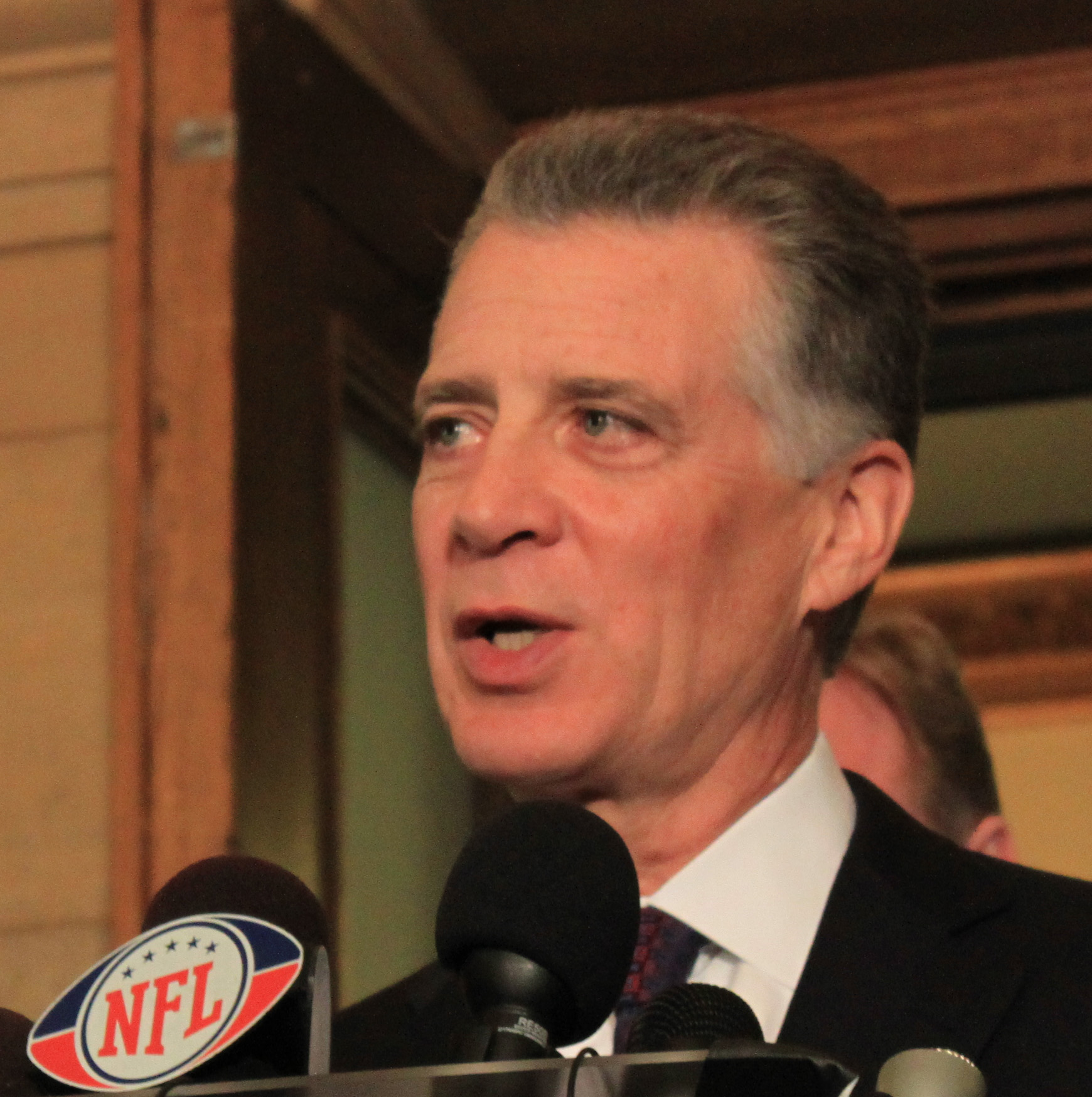
Art Rooney II, owner of the Pittsburgh Steelers (2003–present)

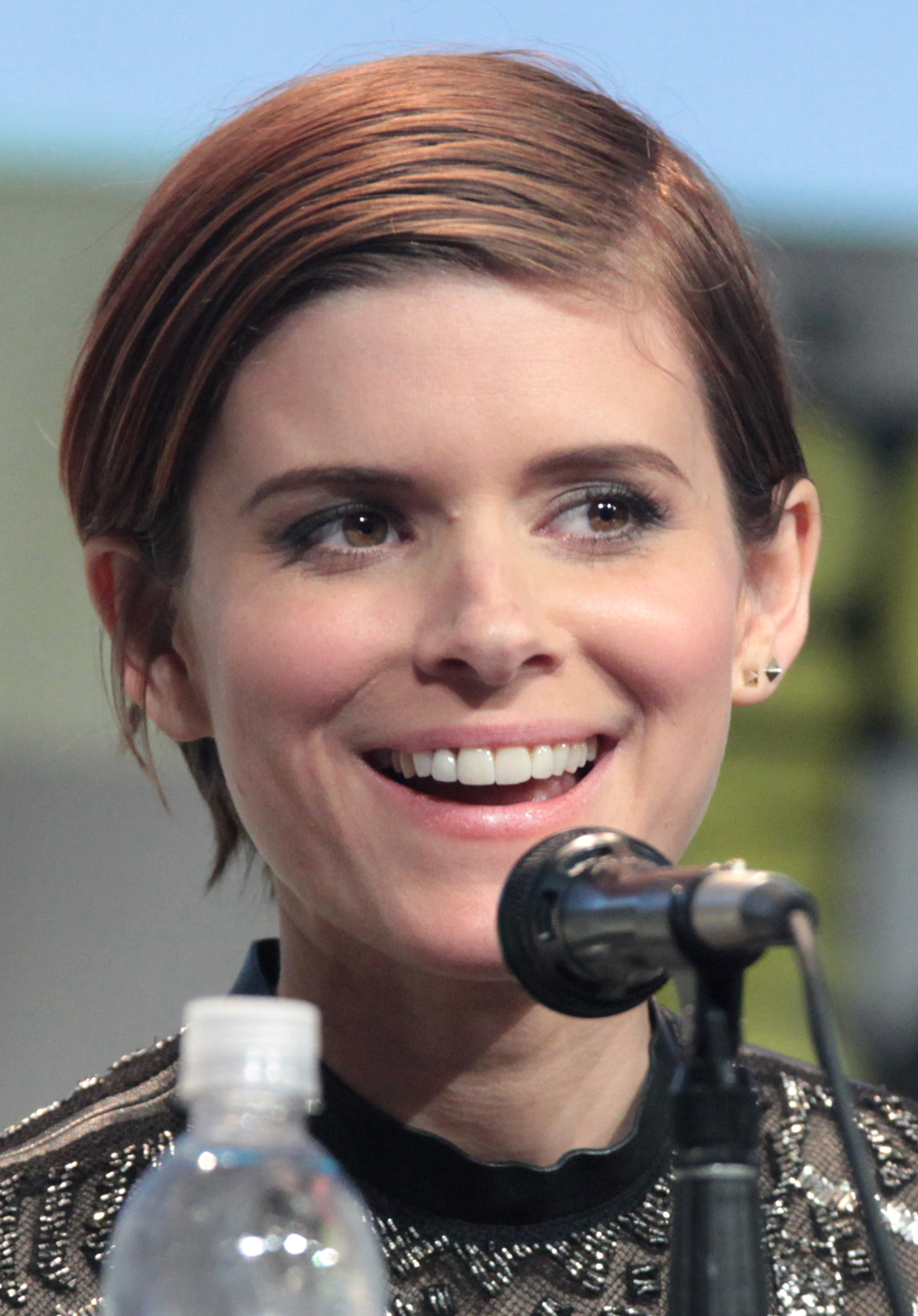
Kate Mara, actress and film producer

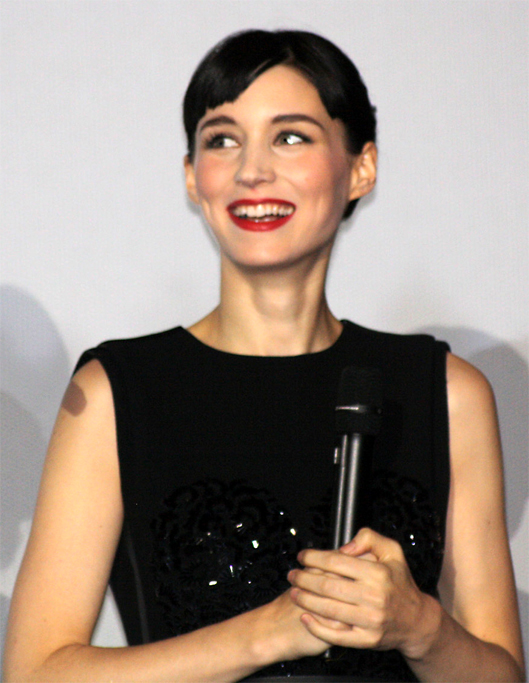
Rooney Mara, actress and animal rights activist

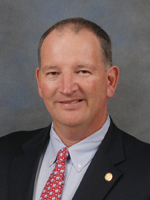
Patrick Rooney Jr., retired member of the Florida House of Representatives (R)

== Ownership restructuring ==
In July 2008 the Rooney family went public with the plan to reorganize the ownership structure of the franchise. Each of the five Rooney brothers owns 16% of the team, combining for 80%, while another related family, the McGinleys, own 20%. Dan Rooney, chairman, stated that his four brothers are moving towards other non-football-related business ventures and he is in talks with them to buy out their shares. However, the other four brothers believe Dan undervalued their shares, and hired Goldman Sachs to give them an estimate on the team. The estimate by Goldman Sachs valued the team between $800 million and $1.2 billion. One potential buyer has been identified, Stanley Druckenmiller, the Pittsburgh billionaire who is the chairman of Duquesne Capital Management and a former money manager for George Soros. Talks to restructure the ownership continued for two years to comply with NFL ownership policies and ensure ownership and operation under the Rooney family. The four brothers' ventures with family race tracks that allow slot machines violate NFL rules of ownership with revenue from gambling enterprises. The ownership structure also violated the NFL rule stating that at least one individual must own 30% of the team to be the principal owner, and no individual owns at least 30% of the team. The team did not expect the negotiations to have any effect on the players or fans.

NFL owners unanimously approved the restructuring of ownership on December 17, 2008, after Dan & Art II obtained the mandated 30% stake via negotiations. Timothy and Patrick Rooney sold their shares outright. Art Jr. John Rooney reduced their shares from 16% to 6%, and the McGinley family reduced their shares from 20% to 10%. Also coming on as partners were Pilot Corporation & Pilot Travel Centers president Jim Haslam III (who would later relinquish his stake upon purchasing the rival Cleveland Browns), Legendary Pictures president & CEO Thomas Tull, and the Paul Family of Pittsburgh, an influential Pittsburgh family (Ampco-Pittsburgh Corp., serves on numerous boards, including University of Pittsburgh Medical Center and University of Pittsburgh), each getting a 16% stake in the team. Dan Rooney mentioned he has no ill will towards Druckenmiller, mentioning he's a great Steelers fan and wishes he remains one.

The Steelers later announced on March 23, 2009, that they added three more investors to the team, the most notable of which is Hall of Fame wide receiver John Stallworth. The other two investors added were GTCR chairman Bruce V. Rauner and the Varischetti Family of Brockway, Pennsylvania, which owns several nursing homes and a commercial real estate business. The deal to add all six new investors was finalized in May 2009.

== Awards and honors ==
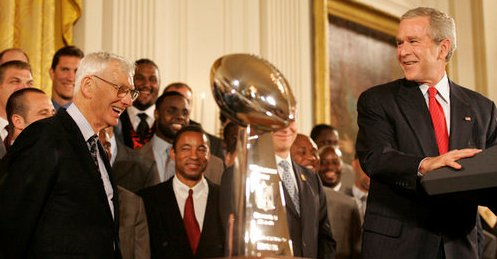
The Rooney Family are six-time Super Bowl winners as the owners of the Steelers. Dan Rooney (left) is shown here with President George W. Bush (right) after winning his family's fifth Lombardi Trophy in 2006.

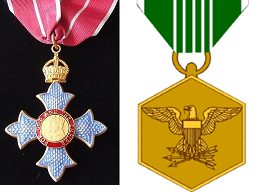
Dan Rooney was named an honorary CBE in 2008 (left), while Rep. Tom Rooney received two Army Commendation Medals during his stint in the U.S. Army (right)

=== Sports ===
- Six-time Super Bowl winners (as owners of the Pittsburgh Steelers)
- Two-time Pro Football Hall of Fame inductees
  - Art – class of 1964
  - Dan – class of 2000
- 2006: Outstanding Team ESPY Award (as owners of the Super Bowl XL winning Steelers)
- 1978: NFL Alumni Order of the Leather Helmet Award – Art
- Art Rooney Avenue in Pittsburgh named in Art's honor
- Statue in front of Heinz Field – Art
- Duquesne University football stadium named Arthur J. Rooney Athletic Field
- 2009: Jack Horrigan Memorial Award – Dan (Professional Football Writers of America)
- 2014: Sports Business Journal Lifetime Achievement Award – Dan (for establishing the Rooney Rule)

=== Military ===
- Honorary CBE – Dan
- Two-time Army Commendation Medal recipient – Tom

=== Acting ===
- 2015: Cannes Film Festival Award for Best Actress – Rooney Mara (shared with Emmanuelle Bercot)

== Political offices held ==
- Pennsylvania General Assembly - James P. (1931–1936)
- U.S. Ambassador to Ireland – Dan (2009–2012)
- U.S. Representative – Tom (2009–2019)
- Florida State Representative – Patrick Jr. (2010–2016)
