= Art Rooney II =

American football executive and lawyer (born 1952)

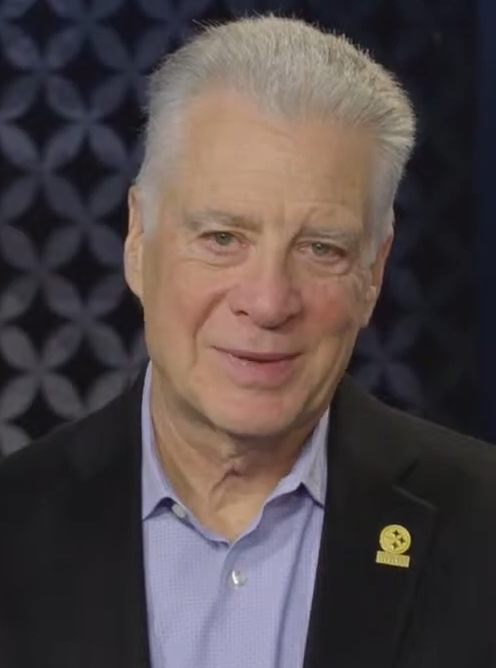
- Rooney in 2024

Pittsburgh Steelers
- Title: Owner; president

Personal information
- Born: September 14, 1952 (age 74); Pittsburgh, Pennsylvania, U.S.

Career information
- High school: Gilmour Academy
- College: University of Pittsburgh (BA); Duquesne University (JD)

Career history
- Pittsburgh Steelers (2003–present); President (2003–present); Owner (2017–present)

Awards and highlights
- 2× Super Bowl champion (XL, XLIII)

Arthur Joseph Rooney II (born September 14, 1952) is an American professional football executive and lawyer who is the owner and president of the Pittsburgh Steelers of the National Football League (NFL).

A member of the Rooney family, he helped oversee the team's Super Bowl XL and Super Bowl XLIII victories in 2005 and 2008 respectively. He also serves on several NFL committees and inherited a majority stake in the Steelers after his father Dan Rooney’s death in 2017. Outside of football, Rooney has a legal background and is actively involved in community organizations in Pittsburgh.

== Early life and education ==
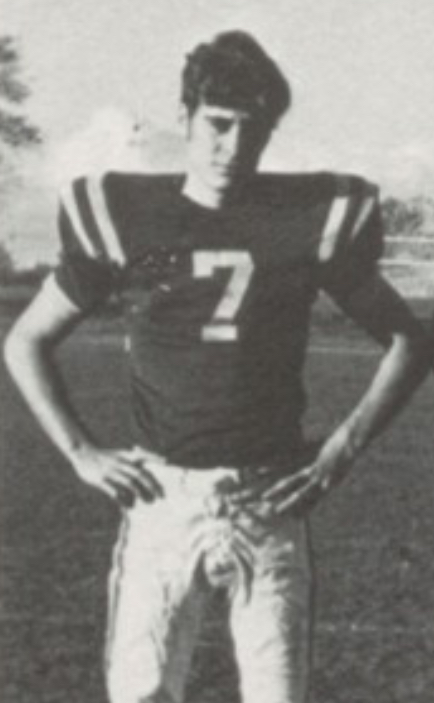
Rooney in his football uniform at Gilmour Academy (c. 1970)

Arthur Joseph Rooney II was born on September 14, 1952 in Pittsburgh, Pennsylvania, the eldest of nine children of longtime Steelers chairman Dan Rooney and Patricia Reagan, and the grandson of Steelers founder "the Chief", Art Rooney Sr. He grew up in Mt. Lebanon, Pennsylvania and attended Gilmour Academy, a private Catholic boarding school in Gates Mills, Ohio. While at Gilmour, he played football for the varsity team at the quarterback position as was named a team captain in 1969, his senior year. In 1978, Rooney graduated from the University of Pittsburgh with a Bachelor of Arts degree in political science. He then attended Duquesne University’s school of law. During his time at the university he spent the summer of 1981 studying at University of Exeter before earning his Juris Doctor degree in 1982.

Rooney later recalled his father Dan Rooney as dedicated to his work with the Steelers, often absent due to frequent travel and long hours while he was growing up. He noted that despite the demanding schedule, Dan made efforts to involve him in the team's endeavors, often bringing him to work on Saturdays and including him in conversations about team matters, particularly those between Dan and his father, Art Rooney Sr. He stated his father and grandfather had a focus on productivity and humility, recalling their frequent advice to "not be a big shot", which helped serve as influence to his own tenure as team owner later on.

== Career ==
=== National Football League ===
Rooney began his career serving as vice president and general counsel of the Pittsburgh Steelers shortly after his college graduation. In 1989, he began to serve on the board of directors of the Steelers. It was during this role, the team saw success advancing to Super Bowl XXX which the Steelers lost to the Dallas Cowboys. It was the first championship with Rooney being employed with Pittsburgh.

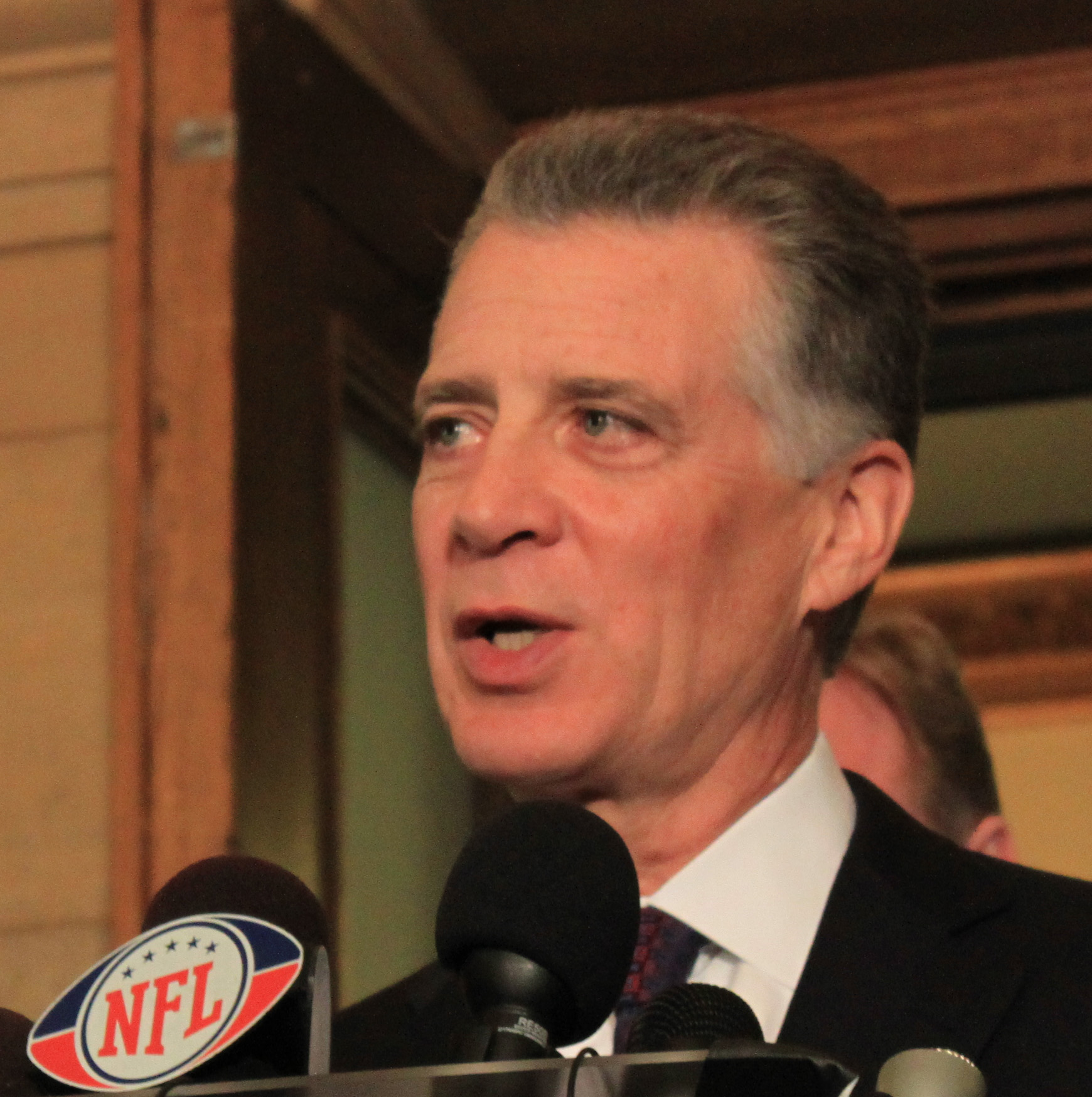
Rooney at a press conference in April 2012

He was named team president in May 2003 with his father serving as the chairman for the team while ceasing day-to-day operations. His tenure began with a poor outing from the 2003 team, which finished with a 6-10 record, their worst since 1988. Initially, Rooney worked in tandem with his father, holding joint meetings with coaches and players. Notably, following the aforementioned 2003 season, the Rooneys met with head coach Bill Cowher to discuss the team's future. Cowher claims Rooney never interjected his own ideas, rather, he wanted to know what Cowher's goals were, asking him "what kind of changes do you plan on making?" rather than demand a change. It was then that the Steelers saw immediate success following the 2004 NFL draft which included drafting quarterback Ben Roethlisberger. The team improved to a 15-1 record and recorded their first AFC championship appearance since the 2001 season.

Rooney oversaw the Steelers through two Super Bowl victories, Super Bowl XL in 2005 and Super Bowl XLIII in 2008 as well as an additional appearance in Super Bowl XLV in 2010. Rooney also oversaw the head coaching change from Bill Cowher to Mike Tomlin in the 2007 offseason. Uncommon for an NFL franchise owner, Rooney's only business venture has been with the Steelers as he was a lawyer prior to his work with the team. In total during his term as team owner, the Steelers have captured six division titles, three championship titles and two Super Bowls. As of the 2024 season, Pittsburgh has a record of 223-131-2 under Rooney's ownership.

Much like his father, Rooney has been known to be patient with the team. Despite off-the-field issues with quarterback Ben Roethlisberger in 2009 and 2010, Rooney stayed committed to Roethlisberger. Rooney refused to trade Roethlisberger and permitted him to participate in the Steelers' training camp despite an ongoing legal process. He commented that Roethlisberger "was sincerely contrite for his past behavior" and that he had "assurance" from Roethlisberger that he "is firmly committed to working hard every day to regain the trust and respect of this organization". In 2024, the Steelers officially recorded their longest playoff victory drought since 1972 at eight years. The Steelers finished their 2024 campaign on a five-game losing streak and led to questions from NFL analysts that Tomlin could possibly be fired or traded in the offseason. Rooney and the Steelers declined a trade offer from the Chicago Bears for Tomlin in January 2025. Rooney also confirmed he would not fire Tomlin shortly after.

Rooney serves as the chairman of the NFL's Stadium Committee, and is on numerous NFL boards, including the Legislative Committee, the Management Council Executive Committee, the International Committee and the Digital Media Committee. Prior to his father's 2017 death, Rooney held at least a 20% stake in the Steelers franchise, with a combination of him and his father owning at least 30% and was in line to inherit most of his father's share, which would make Rooney the majority owner of the team. He is one of only three third-generation owners in the league. The first being John Mara, to whom he is related by marriage, (Mara's brother is married to Rooney's sister, and Rooney is the first cousin once removed of actresses Rooney Mara and Kate Mara.) and the second being George McCaskey, grandson of Chicago Bears founder George Halas.

=== Law career ===
After being admitted to the Pennsylvania bar in 1982, Rooney spent the next 20 years practicing law. His legal practice has concentrated in the areas of corporate finance, sports law and government affairs. Rooney served as a judicial clerk for the U.S. Court of Appeals from 2002 until 2003. He currently holds an Of counsel position with the law firm Buchanan Ingersoll & Rooney. He is active in the Pittsburgh community, devoting a substantial amount of his time to various organizations. He currently serves on the boards of the Pittsburgh Public Theater, Saint Vincent College, the Heinz History Center and the United Way.

== Personal life ==
Rooney married Greta Kimball on July 13, 1985, in Pittsburgh. The couple have four children together. His eldest son, Daniel Martin Rooney, has been the Director of Business Development & Strategy for the Steelers since 2022. As of 2025, Rooney and his family reside in Pittsburgh for much of the year, while maintaining a second residence in Palm Beach, Florida.

In September 2024, Rooney received an Honorary Doctorate in Law from the University of Exeter in the United Kingdom for his achievements in sports and business.

Sporting positions
Preceded by Dan M. Rooney	Pittsburgh Steelers owner 2017–present	Incumbent
