= Logos and uniforms of the New York Giants =

The New York Giants of the National Football League have had numerous uniforms and logos since their founding in 1925.

== Logos ==
Giants logos have revolved around three distinct concepts: a "giant" football player poised to throw a pass, the word "Giants" and variations on the initials for New York. The "ny", "NY", and GIANTS logos have been featured on the team's uniforms over the past 46 years, though currently the original or current GIANTS script logo does not appear on the team's uniforms, although it appeared on their helmets throughout the 1980s and 1990s.

=== Lowercase "ny" and GIANTS script ===
The short-lived uppercase "NY" logo of the 1975 season

Prior to the 1961 campaign, the Giants official logo was the "giant quarterback" logo created by Marie Barclay Steinmuller, who also created the original "ny" logo. Starting in 1961, a stylized white lowercase "ny" was added to both sides of the team's helmet. This logo survived until 1975, when a stylized white and blue uppercase "NY" replaced it. The uppercase "NY" was itself replaced a season later by the team nickname written out in bold italicized white capital letters (GIANTS). This change was sparked by the team moving its operations to the Meadowlands in New Jersey.

Giants script logo (1976–present). Also used as the team's primary logo from 1976 to 1999.

In the 2000 season, an updated stylized blue and red lowercase "ny" returned as the primary logo (depicted as white when placed on the team's helmets), relegating GIANTS to a secondary role as the team's script logo. Controversy surrounded the change because the team remained in New Jersey. Owner Wellington Mara remarked "We are not attempting to make a political statement. Many people have remarked over the years that the "ny" logo is the greatest logo not being used. We happen to agree. We represent, and always have, the New York/New Jersey metropolitan area. We did when we played at the Polo Grounds, Yankee Stadium, Shea Stadium and the Yale Bowl, and we have since we moved to New Jersey. We are proud to represent this region, and we're proud of our heritage."

In 2005 a new script was introduced, "GIANTS" in block letters above a graphic containing the lowercase "ny" logo in a circle. This script logo contains all four team colors: blue, red, white and gray. While it was used prominently on team merchandise, the underlined script remained in the Giants' end zones. In 2007, the newer script was demoted to secondary logotype, with the underlined script again taking precedence.

=== The Giant quarterback ===
The "giant quarterback" logo is illustrative of the evolution of both the Giants and the sport that they play. Initially, the giant quarterback towers above the New York City skyline, then Yankee Stadium (the team's home from 1956 to 1973), and finally Giants Stadium (their home from 1976 to 2009). Previous to his current incarnation, the logo-bound giant quarterbacks executed a "stiff-arm" as part of his pass wind-up and wore a helmet with no face mask. The current giant quarterback prepares to throw without a stiff-arm and wears current NFL gear, including a helmet with a facemask.

== Uniforms ==
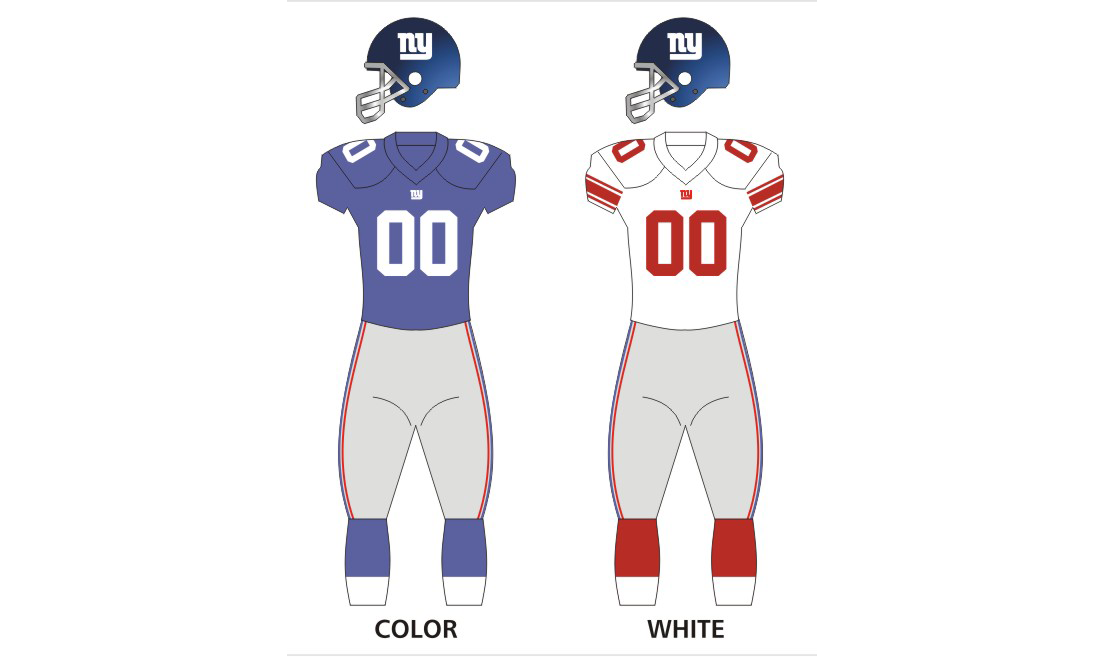
Uniforms worn from 2016 to 2020.

Since 1949, the Giants have worn blue helmets, royal blue or red home jerseys, and white road jerseys accented by blue, red, or a combination of both. Their uniform pants (with the exception of a blue road version in the late 1970s) have alternated between white or gray with various combinations of blue and red striping. Currently, the team wears uniforms that are based on Giants designs of the late 1960s and early 1970s as well as the late 1950s and early 1960s: blue helmets and jerseys with white pants and blue socks at home, and blue helmets, white jerseys with gray pants and red socks on the road.

=== 1950–1960 ===
Prior to 1953, the Giants wore red jerseys for most home games. From 1937 through 1952, the typical Giants home uniform consisted of solid red or blue jerseys with white block numbers, blue helmets, gray pants with red or blue socks, and black cleats. There were no designated "home" or "road" uniforms until 1957. A solid white jersey with blue block numbers, the inverse of the solid blue jerseys, replaced the red jersey in 1953. In 1954 the white jersey acquired red numbers and red Northwestern stripes (named after Northwestern University where they are believed to have originated) which consists of three parallel horizontal stripes, with the central stripe approximately double the thickness of the other two. gray pants with red socks, and black cleats. Red would not be featured as a primary home jersey color until the design was resurrected in the 2004 season as the Giants' official "alternate" jersey.

From 1953 through 1956 the Giants usually wore their white jerseys at home, including every home game for the 1954 season. Red socks were worn with the white jerseys and blue socks with the blue jerseys. The pants were solid gray without stripes.

In 1956, the team's first year in Yankee Stadium, the Giants wore white jerseys for most home games. These white jerseys, with their red numerals and Northwestern stripes, featured new red "TV numbers" above the stripes. These white jerseys were worn on the day of the team's 47–7 victory over the Chicago Bears in the NFL Championship game at "The Stadium."

In 1957 the NFL passed a rule stating all teams would have two jerseys in their uniform sets, one primary color and the other white. This season the blue jersey became the Giants standard home jersey.

Appearing on the Giants' helmets for the first time in 1957 were the players' uniform numbers. The two digits, in a small white Futura font, were placed to the left and right of the red center stripe on the back of the helmet in 1957, and at both the front and back of the helmet in 1958. (The first Giant player of contemporary times to be assigned a single-digit number, placekicker Pete Gogolak [1966], wore a helmet with his number "3" placed on the red center stripe, at both the front and back of the helmet). This style and placement of helmet number was adopted in 1963 by the Pittsburgh Steelers, who kept the design into the 1990s. Also, a non-contiguous red-blue-red tri-stripe design on the sides of the legs for both home and road pants appeared. In 1960, an integrated khaki belt was introduced to the pants, but the belt lasted a single season.

Uniforms in the NFL at this time were not as standardized as they are today, so the "template" for Giants uniforms during this period was subject to variations that would be considered major today, such as the aforementioned switching of red and blue jerseys at home. Most notably, players from this period were photographed wearing either leather helmets dyed blue without a central red stripe, or with blue plastic helmets featuring the signature red stripe and tethered to the players' heads with a leather chinstrap.

=== 1961–1974 ===
1961 heralded a new era for the team's uniforms, as the club debuted its now-familiar white lower-case "ny" logo on the sides of the previously solid blue helmet. Certain photographs from the early and middle 1960s show the "n" and the "y" out of line on some helmets, which may indicate that the two letters were applied to the helmet with separate decals. The helmet retained its single front-to-back red stripe and white player numbers, and the gray facemask became standard. For home games, the Giants wore their solid royal blue jersey with solid white block numbers without trim, but the "TV numbers" were made slightly smaller and higher on the arm. gray pants with a black belt and thin red/blue/red triple stripes on the sides, solid blue socks and black cleats. For away games, they retained the solid white jersey with red block numbers without trim and triple "Northwestern" red stripe just above the hem of the sleeves. The pants were gray with solid red socks.

The basic template for the home and away uniforms would undergo some changes in the years to come:

Further illustrating the lack of league uniform standards, the 1961 pants featured two different striping patterns: the previous thin red-blue-red non-contiguous tri-stripe and also a thin, wide-spaced double red stripe.

In 1962, the pants striping was again changed, for some time to come, to a thicker contiguous red-blue-red tri-stripe.

In 1964 and 1965 the road jersey lost its Northwestern-style sleeve stripes.

1966 brought a major change for the Giants' road uniform; the white jersey featured new royal-blue numerals with a thick blue-red-blue contiguous sleeve stripe and blue "TV numbers". Road-uniform socks changed from red to blue/red/blue striped. Also in 1966, the thick contiguous red-blue-red tri-stripe on the pant legs were reversed to a thick contiguous blue-red-blue tri-stripe and the color of the pants both at home and on the road were changed from gray to white. The Giants wore the white jerseys at home for all their home games in 1967 for first time since 1956, and the first full season since 1954.

The helmets featured new players' numerals in 1967 as well; some helmets carried a smaller and more squared style of number, others a larger and thinner number in a Helvetica font. Still other helmets, including that of Fran Tarkenton, who came to the Giants that season in a trade with the Minnesota Vikings, bore the older 1957-style numbers. In 1968 the white striped socks with the white jerseys were gone, solid blue socks were worn with both jerseys.

In 1969, the Giants along with the other teams in the NFL wore a special commemorative patch to honor the league's 50th regular season.

In 1970 a second white jersey was introduced, with thin blue-red-blue stripes located at the bottom of the sleeve. This became the sole white jersey beginning in 1972.

=== 1975–1979 ===
1975 would see unquestionably the most radical re-design of a Giants uniform in the second half of the 20th century. The 1974 descendant of the 1966 uniform was shelved in favor of a design that emphasized striping and the accent color white. Almost everything in both home and road uniforms changed, from the helmet down to the cleats.

The helmet's red stripe was now flanked by two thin white stripes (the helmet numbers were removed), and a white facemask replaced the traditional gray one. The home blue jersey gained red trim around its block numbers, and red/white/red/white/red stripes on its sleeves. The white pants introduced a blue belt (which replaced the black belt) and a new side stripe pattern (thin red/thick blue/thin red). The socks, while still blue at the edges, mirrored the sleeve stripe pattern down the center portion of the sock.

The away uniform had the same template as the home version with most colors swapped: the jersey was white with blue numbers trimmed in red, the sleeves had red/blue/red/blue/red stripes, the pants were blue (with a blue belt) with a thin red/thick white/thin red side stripe. White socks with the away jersey shoulder stripe pattern were used. Finally, amidst the wide-reaching changes, the team's cleats became white (which replaced the traditional black ones).

Perhaps even more radical than the uniform redesign was the team's switch from the classic lowercase "ny" logo to an uppercase "NY" as its primary logo. Echoing the 1975 uniform's affinity for stripes, the logo pattern itself is composed of stripes.

One year later, a new logo was introduced and the uppercase "NY" logo disappeared: an italicized and underlined GIANTS became the team's primary logo and took up residence on the sides of the helmet. The abrupt change was prompted by the franchise's move from New York to East Rutherford, New Jersey.

The blue away pants would survive four seasons, lasting until the end of the 1978 season. In 1979, the away uniforms used the same white pants as the home uniforms while keeping the same blue belt and away socks.

=== 1980–1999 ===
The design experimentation begun in 1975 did not last into the new decade. The 1980 season witnessed a serious re-design of the uniforms and a general abandonment of the excess of striping: the new uniforms combined elements of several past uniforms from the 1960s and mid-1970s and would be the uniforms worn by the team in their victories in Super Bowls XXI and XXV.

The white stripes on the helmet disappeared, and the sleeve stripes were replaced with a more conservative red-white-red thin striped pattern for the home jerseys and a blue-red-blue version for the white away jerseys last worn in 1974. A similar matching thin-striped pattern was added around the collar for both jerseys. The pants lost the blue belts after the 1984 season (replaced with white ones) and the side stripes returned to the blue-red-blue contiguous stripes of equal thickness seen from 1966 to 1974. The socks also returned to their 1968–74 solid-blue standard for home and away versions.

Not all the 1975 elements were discarded: the redesign did retain the 1975 trim around the block numbers, and the facemask and cleats remained white.

This template would be largely untouched over the next 19 seasons. In 1982, the collar striping became "pointed" at the base of the neck to form a "V", and in 1985 the block number font was altered to have a slightly more robust appearance. In 1991, the Giants and all other franchises added the NFL shield below the "V" on the jersey collar and to the upper left thigh of the pants.

The Giants wore white at home throughout the 1980 season. Blue has remained the Giants home jersey since the 1981 season, excepting games against division rival Dallas through 1987, due to an alleged curse on the Cowboys' blue jerseys.

==== 1994: NFL's 75th anniversary throwbacks ====
In order to celebrate 75 years of the NFL, during the 1994 season NFL teams were allowed to play a number of games in throwback uniforms. The Giants chose their 1962 home and away templates for the basis of their throwback designs. The resulting uniforms closely matched the '62 designs, with some minor inconsistencies: both home and road uniforms featured white cleats and white belts instead of the black cleats and no belts (the pants were held together with drawstrings) worn during that season. Additionally, the gray road pants had a slight metallic look to them (similar in appearance to the Dallas Cowboys' silver pants), contrasting with the flat gray of the past, while the home uniforms featured white pants with the 1962 contiguous red-blue-red striping down the sides.

Furthermore, the white lowercase "ny" logo was placed on the helmets for the first time since 1974. Also, gray facemasks reappeared and the players' uniform numbers were placed on the helmets. The Giants (like the Pittsburgh Steelers) chose the helmet numbers in the small white Futura font with two digit helmet numbers placed to the left and right of the center stripe and one digit helmet number placed on the center stripe on both the front and back of the helmets. The throwbacks first appeared in a contest at home against the Washington Redskins and in a road game against the New Orleans Saints, and appeared again during the last six weeks of that season after the Giants began wearing them in a Week 12 Monday night game against Houston. The Giants won every one of those last six games while wearing the throwbacks.

=== 2000–2004 ===
For the 2000 season, the team introduced new designs for both home and away uniforms. While the home version was modeled on its predecessor from the early 1960s, the away design combined elements of the previous four decades of Giants away uniforms.

The home design had several subtle differences over its early 1960s forerunners:

- The royal blue in the home jersey was darkened slightly to a shade known as "dark royal blue"
- The helmet closely matched its precursor (down to the frontally-mounted and base-mounted double player block numbers on either side of the central red stripe and the frontally-mounted and base-mounted single player block number on the central red stripe, the Giants are one of only two teams in the NFL to have this feature, with the other team being the Pittsburgh Steelers), but added a metallic appearance. The gray facemask. Furthermore, the white lowercase "ny" logo on the helmets was more rounded and vertically elongated
- The "TV numbers" featured on the sides of the jersey's sleeves migrated to the top of the shoulders
- As with the 1994 throwbacks, the black belts and cleats did not return, replaced instead by a gray belt and white cleats
- A red triangle containing the NFL shield was placed at the tip of the collar's "V".

The white road jersey had less to do with the 1960s variants and more with the 1980s and 1990s designs, but had the number switched from blue trimmed in red to red with blue trim, and player names appeared in blue.

The home pant design featured gray pants with gray belts, with the pant legs adorned with a single thick red stripe directly bordered by two blue stripes of equal thickness.

The road pants, gray as well, featured a different stripe design: three thinner, non-contiguous stripes of red/blue/red, similar to the style worn from the late 1950s through 1961.

Finally, blue socks accompanied the home uniforms and red socks returned for the away uniforms. For the 2002 season, the away socks again became blue and would remain that way until the end of the 2004 season.

In 2002, the Giants and all other NFL franchises replaced the NFL shield with the "NFL Equipment" logo.

==== The alternate home jersey ====
In Week 12 of the 2004 season, the team introduced an alternate solid red jersey in a game against the Philadelphia Eagles. This variant simply swapped the blue of the regular home jersey for red and retained the same design; home pants and red socks were worn with the jersey. The Giants had last worn a solid red jersey for a regular-season game in 1954. This uniform is similar to which was worn in the 1994 sports comedy Little Giants starring Rick Moranis and Ed O'Neill. This alternate jersey was retired before the start of the 2009 season.

=== 2005–present ===
In 2005, the Giants unveiled road uniforms that are close replicas of the ones worn by the 1956 Giants Championship team, save for small details such as the helmet's metallic look, the addition of belts and different block number locations.

A subtle alteration in 2005 affected both the home and away uniforms: the GIANTS script logo below the neck of the jersey was replaced with the lowercase "ny" logo (white on the home and home alternate jersey and red one for away). As previously noted, this ended a 29-year run of the GIANTS script logo appearing on the team's uniforms in some capacity.

2005 also marked the switch from white to black cleats (a change not reflected in the official uniform templates pictured above), ending 30 seasons of white footwear for the team. However, the white cleats would return in 2013 when the Giants unveiled new alternate uniforms (see article below) to be worn for a couple of home games. In 2016, the white cleats returned on a full-time basis, though with the NFL's more lenient rules on colored footwear in recent years, some players began appearing in red, blue or gray cleats as well.

==== 2006: The alternate jersey returns ====
In 2005 and 2006, the Giants wore their alternate jersey during a home game versus their NFC East rivals the Cowboys. Contrasting with the official template (right), the Giants wore their away pants with the red jerseys despite being at home. This appearance marks only the second time the Giants have worn the red alternate jersey, and the first time the alternate jersey has been paired with their current away pants and red socks.

Also for the 2006 campaign, Giants equipment manager Joe Skiba introduced a raised, rubberized solid blue lowercase "ny" logo on the nose bumper plate of Giants non-Riddell helmets. For the red alternate jersey, the logo also switched to red.

==== 2007: Fixed footgear and the third appearance of the alternate jersey ====
Before the 2007 season, NFL regulations stipulated that a team's footgear (whether white or black) could be trimmed in primary team colors. The regulation changed for 2007, dictating each team could choose a single color; the Giants selected red (previously, both blue and red were used).

2007 saw the first change to the previous year's rubberized lowercase "ny" logo on the helmet bumper: for normal home/away jerseys, the lowercase "ny" logo is blue with red trim.

In Week 10 of the 2007 season, the red alternate jersey (with the same "away pants" template seen in 2006) reappeared, at home, against the Dallas Cowboys. The helmet bumper logo was reversed from the regular home/away version, with a red lowercase "ny" logo with blue trim. In addition to the red-accented black cleats, the alternate uniform was augmented by certain players with all-red long sleeved shirts and predominantly red gloves.

In the 2012 season the team wore the 1956–1961 pants style, gray with three thin non-contiguous red/blue/red stripes, on a full-time basis. Previously these pants had been worn for away games and select home games; through 2011 the later version of the pants, with the thicker contiguous red/blue/red striping, was used for a majority of home games. Also in 2012, the NFL loosened rules regarding footgear, thus allowing some of the Giants players to wear customized cleats in the red, blue, white or gray colors, as well as pink during October for National Breast Cancer Awareness Month.

==== 2007 Playoffs and Super Bowl XLII ====
The Giants entered the NFL playoffs as a 5th seed (a wild card position) ensuring they would likely never play on their home turf throughout the playoffs. In their opening round contest against the Tampa Bay Buccaneers, the Buccaneers chose their road uniform, forcing the Giants to play in their home uniform. In the next round versus the 1st seeded Dallas Cowboys, Dallas wore their white home uniform, meaning the Giants once again had to wear their blue home uniform on the road. In the subsequent NFC Championship round in Green Bay, the Giants finally had to wear their road uniform, as the Packers went with their home greens.

The Giants reached the Super Bowl, and since the AFC and NFC alternate "home team" designation in the Super Bowl, the New England Patriots wore their home blues, forcing the Giants to wear their road uniforms. The Giants ultimately won the game, marking their first Super Bowl victory in their road uniform.

==== 2013: A new alternate uniform ====
On March 16, 2013, the New York Giants announced a new alternate uniform, replacing the red uniform. The new outfit was described as being identical to the blue home uniform, but paired with white pants (a white belt) with a thin red stripe bordered by blue and gray stripes as well as white cleats, giving a look broadly similar to the 1999 home uniform.

==== 2016–2021: Gray pants are gradually eliminated ====
On July 12, 2016, the Giants announced that the new alternate uniform that was introduced in 2013 will be worn full-time at all home games. This will be the first time the Giants have worn the white pants and white cleats with the blue jerseys and blue socks on a full-time basis since the 1996–1999 seasons. From 2016 to 2018, the blue uniform-gray pants combination was used as an alternate uniform in select preseason and regular season away games against teams that choose to wear white uniforms (most notably against the Dallas Cowboys).

In the 2018 season, the Giants are scheduled to wear the blue jersey/white pants combination for two road games: September 23 at the Houston Texans, and October 7 at the Carolina Panthers. This will mark the first time since 1999 that the Giants will wear the blue/white ensemble on the road. In 2019, the gray pants were paired exclusively with the white jerseys, leaving the white pants to be paired in every game (home or away) the Giants wore the blue jerseys.

Prior to the 2021 season, the Giants unveiled a new set of white pants to pair with the road white uniform. This design featured red and white stripes patterned after the sleeve stripes of the road uniform. The previous white jersey/gray pants set was worn October 11 at home against the Los Angeles Rams to commemorate the 10th anniversary of their Super Bowl XLVI victory.

==== 2016–present: Color Rush and 1980–1999 throwback uniform ====
In September 2016, the Giants, along with the other 31 NFL teams, unveiled their Color Rush uniform. The uniform is all white from shoulders to feet, and the design was based on the away white uniforms worn from 1980 to 1999. However, there were a few differences. The blue "ny" logo was stitched below the collar, which did not exist on the original uniform. In addition, the Giants wore their current blue helmets, albeit with the "GIANTS" wordmark decal replacing the "ny", making it a quasi-throwback design due to the then-implementation of the NFL's one-helmet rule (this rule has been repealed in 2022). The uniform was worn for their Week 16 game against the Philadelphia Eagles on December 22. In 2017, the uniform was worn for their Week 14 game against the Dallas Cowboys on December 10, the first time the Giants wore white at a regular season home game since the 2000 season opener vs. the Arizona Cardinals. In 2018, the uniform was worn for their Week 6 game against the Philadelphia Eagles on October 11. In 2019, the uniform was worn for their Week 9 game, which was played on a Monday night, against the Dallas Cowboys on November 4. In 2020, the uniform was worn for their Week 8 game, which was played on a Monday night, against the Tampa Bay Buccaneers on November 2. In 2021, the Giants would wear the Color Rush set twice: November 22 against the Buccaneers, and November 28 against the Eagles. The Color Rush jerseys would be worn again in 2022 against the Cowboys on September 26.

For two games in 2022, the Giants would wear a throwback blue uniform based on the home uniforms from that same era. Unlike the Color Rush uniform, the design stayed mostly true to the originals, including a darker blue alternate helmet with the "GIANTS" wordmark. These would be worn October 2 against the Chicago Bears, and December 4 against the Washington Commanders. For 2023, the Giants wore the blue throwbacks October 22 against Washington and December 11 against Green Bay, and the alternate dark blue helmets were paired with the white Color Rush uniform on October 15 when the Giants visited the Buffalo Bills. In 2024, the Giants would once again wear their throwback blue uniform against the Commanders on November 8.

Ahead of the 2025 season, the Giants brought back the white vintage Color Rush uniforms for two games: November 9 against the Bears, and November 16 against the Packers. These uniforms will now be worn full-time with the dark blue throwback helmets. The throwback blue uniform would be worn November 2 against the 49ers, and December 14 against the Commanders.

For 2026, both throwback uniforms would be worn twice each. The vintage white uniform was worn November 8 at the Eagles, and November 12 against the Commanders. The November 8 game was notable for both teams wearing throwback uniforms, as the Eagles wore their kelly green throwbacks. The throwback blue uniform was worn October 4 against the Cardinals and December 6 against the 49ers.

==== 2024: 100th season commemorative uniform ====
For the 2024 season, the Giants wore a "Century Red" alternate uniform commemorating the franchise's 100th season. The uniform was a combination of the following uniforms: The red jersey with blue middle stripe was a throwback to the 1933 season, while tan pants and red socks with blue and white stripes were from 1925. The blue and red winged helmet was a callback to the 1938 kit commemorating the NFL championship-winning team. The uniforms were worn in Week 1 against the Minnesota Vikings. This set replaced the 1980s-inspired "Color Rush" white uniform in the team's rotation.

== Gallery of logos ==
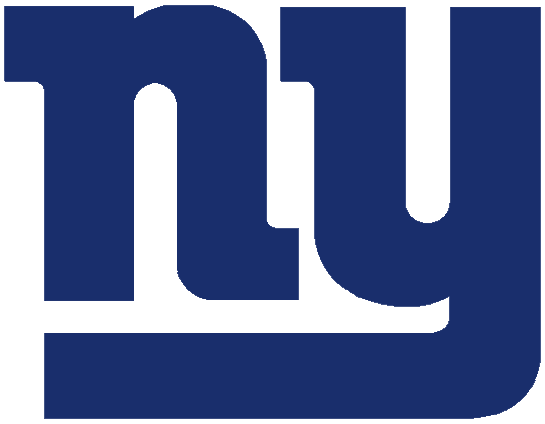
Giants primary logo (1961-1974, 2000–present)

Giants primary / helmet logo (1975).

Giants script (1976–present), Giants primary logo (1976-1999)
