= Ann Mara =

American socialite and philanthropist (1929–2015)

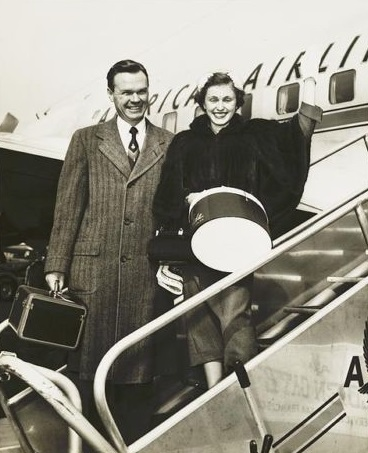
- Ann and Wellington Mara in 1954
- Born: Ann Maria Teresa Mumm; June 18, 1929; Manhattan, New York, U.S.
- Died: February 1, 2015 (aged 85); Harrison, New York, U.S.
- Spouse: Wellington Mara (m. 1954; died 2005)
- Children: 11, including John
- Relatives: Doug Brown (son-in-law); Patrick Brown (grandson); Kate Mara (granddaughter); Rooney Mara (granddaughter)
- Family: Mara (by marriage)

Ann Mara (born Ann Maria Teresa Mumm; June 18, 1929 – February 1, 2015) was an American businesswoman, socialite, philanthropist, the wife of Wellington Mara, and the matriarch of the Mara family, which includes New York Giants CEO John Mara, and her granddaughters, actresses Rooney Mara and Kate Mara.

== Personal life ==
Mara was born Ann Maria Teresa Mumm in Manhattan, New York City, the daughter of Olive (née DuBord) and George Mumm. She was of German, French-Canadian, and Irish ancestry. She married Wellington Mara (1916–2005) in 1954 and had eleven children.

Ann Mumm met Wellington Mara by chance when a woman fainted at a 7:30 a.m. Mass that they both regularly attended. Both Ann and Wellington rushed to her side to help. Three of their early dates took place at Yankee Stadium, Madison Square Garden, and the Fordham gymnasium. Ann and Wellington were married in 1954, and honeymooned in southern California. They had 11 children (7 girls and 4 boys) and 42 grandchildren. All their girls attended Convent of the Sacred Heart.

Her husband is considered to have been one of the most influential figures in the history of the National Football League as the owner of the New York Giants. Ann Mara had been called the "First Lady of Football". As a philanthropist, she donated money to various causes. In November 2014, she dedicated the opening of a new building for the San Miguel Academy for children at risk, which was built through the NFL Snowflake Foundation.

== Media attention ==
Mara was an active member of the Giants community. In 2012, she gained media attention after having an argument with Terry Bradshaw.

== Death ==
Mara was in good health until she fell on ice when she was fetching her newspaper outside of her Harrison home. Mara's housekeeper usually went to get the paper but on that day Mara went to get it herself. She died from pneumonia two weeks after her fall, on February 1, 2015. She was 85 years old. She was remembered with a moment of silence during Super Bowl XLIX; also, the Giants wore a patch on the right side of their uniforms, near the shoulders during the following season in her memory, with the letters "ATM" in black on a white circle background.
