= Patrick Brown (ice hockey) =

American ice hockey player (born 1992)

- Brown with the Adler Mannheim in 2026
- Born: May 29, 1992 (age 34) Bloomfield Hills, Michigan, U.S.
- Height: 6 ft 1 in (185 cm)
- Weight: 210 lb (95 kg; 15 st 0 lb)
- Position: Center
- Shoots: Right
- DEL team Former teams: Adler Mannheim; Carolina Hurricanes; Vegas Golden Knights; Philadelphia Flyers; Ottawa Senators; Boston Bruins
- National team: United States
- NHL draft: Undrafted
- Playing career: 2014–present

Patrick Wellington Brown (born May 29, 1992) is an American professional ice hockey forward for Adler Mannheim of the Deutsche Eishockey Liga (DEL). He previously played in the National Hockey League (NHL) for the Carolina Hurricanes, Vegas Golden Knights, Philadelphia Flyers, Ottawa Senators and Boston Bruins. He won the Calder Cup with Carolina's AHL affiliate, the Charlotte Checkers in 2019.

== Early life ==
Brown was born on May 29, 1992, in Bloomfield Hills, Michigan, to Doug Brown, a former National Hockey League right winger, and Maureen Brown (nee Mara), daughter of Wellington and Ann Mara and a member of the family that owns 50% of the New York Giants. His father played in the NHL for 15 seasons and won back-to-back Stanley Cup championships with the Detroit Red Wings in 1997 and 1998, while his uncle Greg played professional ice hockey in North America and Europe for 11 years before retiring to help coach the Boston College Eagles men's ice hockey team.

Brown followed his father into ice hockey, and in 2005, he played in the Quebec International Pee-Wee Hockey Tournament with a minor ice hockey team from Detroit.

== Playing career ==
=== NCAA ===
Brown played for the Boston College Eagles men's ice hockey team of the NCAA Hockey East Conference, from 2010 to 2014, and was captain during his senior season. He was a member of the Eagles roster that won the 2012 National Championship.

=== Professional ===
==== Carolina Hurricanes ====
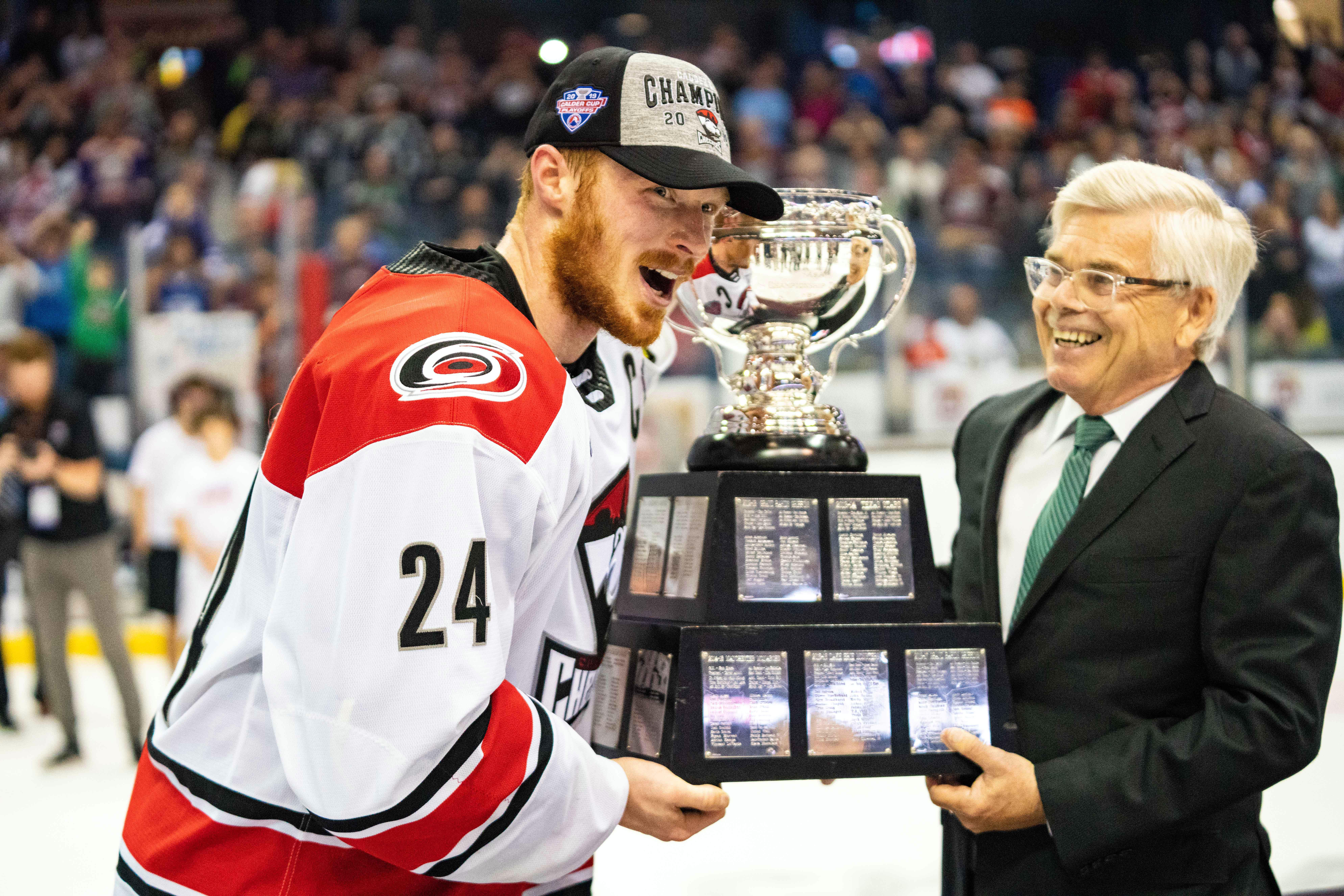
Brown receiving the Calder Cup from David Andrews.

On April 12, 2014, Brown was signed as an undrafted free agent to a two-year entry-level contract with the Carolina Hurricanes. Brown was recalled to make the Hurricanes opening night roster in his first professional season in 2014–15. He made his NHL debut with the Hurricanes in a defeat to the New York Islanders on October 10, 2014. He recorded his first career NHL goal and assist on March 31, 2016, against the New York Rangers. He spent the majority of his tenure in the Hurricanes' organization with their American Hockey League (AHL) affiliate, the Charlotte Checkers, where he was team captain from 2016 to 2019 and won a Calder Cup in 2019.

==== Vegas Golden Knights ====
After spending the first five seasons of his professional career within the Hurricanes organization, Brown left as a free agent to sign a two-year, $1,400,000 contract with the Vegas Golden Knights on July 1, 2019. He spent most of the season with the Golden Knights' AHL affiliate, the Chicago Wolves. He appeared in one regular season game in his first year with Vegas, scoring against the Anaheim Ducks on February 23, 2020. At the end of the season he spent time on the team's taxi squad and was put into the team for Game 3 of the first round series against the Chicago Blackhawks after Paul Stastny and Tomáš Nosek were unable to play. He scored his first NHL playoff goal in that game in a 2–1 victory. The Golden Knights eliminated the Blackhawks and advanced all the way to the Western Conference Final where they were defeated by the Dallas Stars. He finished the playoffs with 12 games played while scoring two goals. In 2021, he was named the team captain of the Golden Knights' new AHL affiliate, the Henderson Silver Knights.

==== Philadelphia Flyers ====
Brown was placed on waivers by the Golden Knights on October 10, 2021 and claimed by the Philadelphia Flyers the next day. Brown was limited to 44 games in his first year with Philadelphia, suffering a pair of injuries. He played mainly on the fourth line as a faceoff specialist. On January 11, 2023, Brown played in his 100th NHL game.

==== Ottawa Senators ====
On March 3, 2023, the Flyers traded Brown to the Ottawa Senators in exchange for a sixth-round pick in the 2023 NHL entry draft. The Senators acquired Brown as depth for the center position. He finished with 43 games for the Flyers during the 2022–23 season, registering two goals and seven points. Following the end of the season, Brown joined Team USA at the 2023 IIHF World Championship. The team finished fourth in the tournament.

==== Boston Bruins ====
As a free agent from the Senators, Brown was signed to a two-year, $1.6 million contract to join his fifth NHL club, the Boston Bruins on July 1, 2023. At the end of the 2023 training camp, Brown failed to make the Bruins roster and was waived on October 8. Brown went unclaimed and was assigned to Boston's AHL affiliate, the Providence Bruins, on October 9. However, his stay in Providence was brief as he was recalled by Boston on October 10. He was returned to Providence on November 25 after appearing in eight games with Boston, registering one point. Afterwards, Brown spent most of the rest of his season in Providence, having two brief call ups to the NHL squad in late December and January which totaled three games. On May 5, 2024, Brown was called back up to the NHL ahead of the Bruins second round Stanley Cup playoffs series against the Florida Panthers. He played Game 1 of the series, replacing Jesper Boqvist, in what was his first NHL game since January 27. The Bruins were eliminated by the Panthers in six games.

In his second season with the Bruins, he went unclaimed on waivers and assigned to Providence to start the 2024–25 season. He was named the 27th captain of Providence on October 17, 2024.

==== Adler Mannheim ====
Having spent the first 12 seasons of his professional career in North America, Brown left the Bruins as a pending free agent and signed his first contract abroad in agreeing to a one-year deal with German club, Adler Mannheim of the DEL, on June 12, 2026.

== Personal life ==
Brown's younger brother Christopher also played at Boston College, and was captain during his junior and senior seasons. Christopher was drafted by the Buffalo Sabres, he currently dresses for the Providence Bruins in the AHL.

Brown's maternal grandfather is Wellington Mara, longtime owner and president of the NFL's New York Giants. He is also cousins with actresses Kate and Rooney Mara.

== Career statistics ==
=== Regular season and playoffs ===
| | | | Regular season | | | | | Playoffs |
| Season | Team | League | GP | G | A | Pts | PIM | GP | G | A | Pts | PIM |
|---|---|---|---|---|---|---|---|---|---|---|---|---|
| 2009–10 | Cranbrook-Kingswood Upper School | USHS | 30 | 23 | 25 | 48 | 14 | — | — | — | — | — |
| 2010–11 | Boston College | HE | 29 | 0 | 1 | 1 | 8 | — | — | — | — | — |
| 2011–12 | Boston College | HE | 13 | 1 | 0 | 1 | 6 | — | — | — | — | — |
| 2012–13 | Boston College | HE | 38 | 5 | 6 | 11 | 14 | — | — | — | — | — |
| 2013–14 | Boston College | HE | 40 | 15 | 15 | 30 | 30 | — | — | — | — | — |
| 2014–15 | Carolina Hurricanes | NHL | 7 | 0 | 0 | 0 | 4 | — | — | — | — | — |
| 2014–15 | Charlotte Checkers | AHL | 60 | 2 | 8 | 10 | 34 | — | — | — | — | — |
| 2015–16 | Charlotte Checkers | AHL | 70 | 13 | 12 | 25 | 29 | — | — | — | — | — |
| 2015–16 | Carolina Hurricanes | NHL | 7 | 1 | 1 | 2 | 4 | — | — | — | — | — |
| 2016–17 | Charlotte Checkers | AHL | 66 | 12 | 16 | 28 | 45 | 5 | 1 | 0 | 1 | 0 |
| 2016–17 | Carolina Hurricanes | NHL | 14 | 0 | 0 | 0 | 0 | — | — | — | — | — |
| 2017–18 | Charlotte Checkers | AHL | 68 | 7 | 20 | 27 | 61 | 8 | 1 | 2 | 3 | 0 |
| 2018–19 | Charlotte Checkers | AHL | 70 | 19 | 16 | 35 | 32 | 11 | 5 | 5 | 10 | 18 |
| 2018–19 | Carolina Hurricanes | NHL | — | — | — | — | — | 8 | 0 | 0 | 0 | 0 |
| 2019–20 | Chicago Wolves | AHL | 60 | 7 | 14 | 21 | 26 | — | — | — | — | — |
| 2019–20 | Vegas Golden Knights | NHL | 1 | 1 | 0 | 1 | 0 | 2 | 1 | 0 | 1 | 0 |
| 2020–21 | Henderson Silver Knights | AHL | 9 | 3 | 5 | 8 | 4 | — | — | — | — | — |
| 2020–21 | Vegas Golden Knights | NHL | 4 | 0 | 0 | 0 | 2 | 12 | 2 | 0 | 2 | 0 |
| 2021–22 | Philadelphia Flyers | NHL | 44 | 4 | 5 | 9 | 11 | — | — | — | — | — |
| 2022–23 | Philadelphia Flyers | NHL | 43 | 2 | 5 | 7 | 17 | — | — | — | — | — |
| 2022–23 | Ottawa Senators | NHL | 18 | 2 | 3 | 5 | 27 | — | — | — | — | — |
| 2023–24 | Providence Bruins | AHL | 42 | 11 | 21 | 32 | 6 | 3 | 1 | 2 | 3 | 0 |
| 2023–24 | Boston Bruins | NHL | 11 | 0 | 1 | 1 | 2 | 1 | 0 | 0 | 0 | 2 |
| 2024–25 | Providence Bruins | AHL | 56 | 17 | 29 | 46 | 23 | 8 | 1 | 2 | 3 | 0 |
| 2024–25 | Boston Bruins | NHL | 15 | 0 | 1 | 1 | 8 | — | — | — | — | — |
| 2025–26 | Providence Bruins | AHL | 71 | 20 | 34 | 54 | 56 | 4 | 0 | 0 | 0 | 4 |
| NHL totals | | | 164 | 10 | 16 | 26 | 75 | 23 | 3 | 0 | 3 | 2 |

=== International ===
| Year | Team | Event | Result | GP | G | A | Pts | PIM |
|---|---|---|---|---|---|---|---|---|
| 2023 | United States | WC | 4th | 7 | 0 | 1 | 1 | 2 |
| Senior totals | | | | 7 | 0 | 1 | 1 | 2 |

== Awards and honors ==
| Award | Year | Ref |
College
| HE All-Academic Team | 2011 | |
AHL
| Calder Cup champion | 2019 | |
