= Jan Van Duser =

American football executive

Personal information
- Born: Elmira, New York

Career information
- College: Columbia University

Career history
- Atlanta Falcons (1966–1970) Director of public relations; National Football Conference (1971–1972) Assistant to the president; National Football League (1973–1981) Director of personnel; National Football League (1982–1990) Director of operations; National Football League (1991–1995) Director of game operations; National Football League (1996–1997) Secretary

Jan Van Duser is an American sports executive who worked for the National Football League from 1971 to 1997.

== Career ==
A native of Elmira, New York, Van Duser graduated from Columbia University in 1959. He was a sportswriter for the Tampa Times and St. Petersburg Times during the early 1960s. In 1964, he joined the staff of The Atlanta Constitution.

In 1966, Van Duser was named public relations director of the expansion Atlanta Falcons of the National Football League. In 1971, he was appointed assistant to the president of the National Football Conference. In 1973, he became the NFL's director of personnel. In this role, Van Duser managed the National Football League draft and processed all player contracts. In 1979, Van Duser was offered the position of general manager of the New York Giants after Commissioner Pete Rozelle stepped in to resolve a stalemate between the team's feuding owners – Wellington Mara and Timothy J. Mara. Van Duser declined the job, which led to the position going to a second compromise candidate, George Young. Van Duser remained in the league office until his retirement in 1997.
