= John Mara =

American businessman and sports team owner (born 1954)

John Kevin Mara
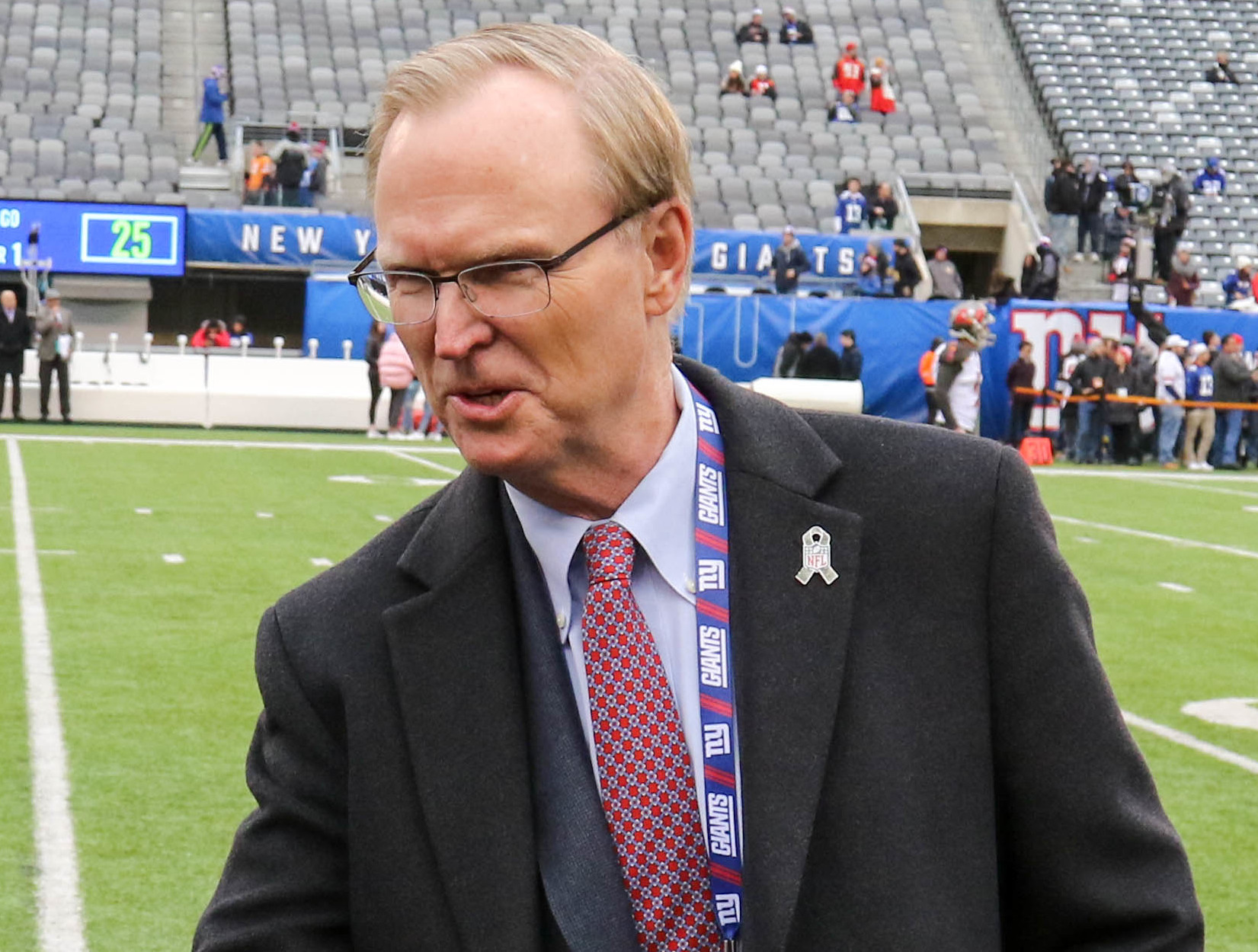
- Mara in 2018

New York Giants
- Title: President, CEO, owner

Personal information
- Born: December 1, 1954 (age 71); New York City, U.S.

Career information
- College: Boston College (BS); Fordham University (JD)

Career history
- New York Giants (2005–present) President & CEO

Awards and highlights
- 2× Super Bowl champion (XLII, XLVI)

John Kevin Mara (/ˈmɑːrə/ MAR-ə; born December 1, 1954) is an American businessman who is the president, CEO, and owner of the New York Giants.

== Early life and education ==
Mara was born in New York City and grew up in White Plains, a nearby suburb. He is the eldest son of Ann Mara (née Mumm) and late Giants owner Wellington Mara.

Mara graduated from Iona Preparatory School in New Rochelle, and graduated cum laude from Boston College in 1976 with a Bachelor of Science in marketing. He earned his Juris Doctor degree from Fordham University School of Law in 1979.

He specialized in labor and employment law and litigation at two Manhattan firms prior to joining the Giants.

== Career ==
=== New York Giants ===
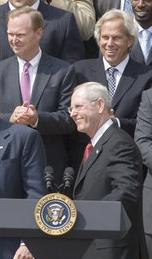
Mara (left) at the Giants' visit to the White House after their Super Bowl XLII victory

Mara joined the Giants in 1991, serving as general counsel, and later as executive vice president and chief operating officer, until his father's death in 2005, when he assumed the team's presidency.

Mara and Steve Tisch were at the forefront of the planning and negotiations for MetLife Stadium, which opened in 2010.

Under Mara and Tisch, the Giants won Super Bowl XLII and Super Bowl XLVI.

After skipping road games in 2025 for health reasons, Mara returned to the NFL owners' meetings in March 2026.

==== Criticism ====
Despite winning two Super Bowls during his tenure as owner, Mara was criticized in the late 2010s and early 2020s for being too loyal to longtime Giants employees.

In September 2021, he was booed by fans while speaking at Eli Manning's number retirement and Ring of Honor ceremony, and did not address the crowd that November when the team retired Michael Strahan's number.

Mara was also criticized for keeping Dave Gettleman throughout his four-year tenure, instead allowing Gettleman to retire at the end of the 2021 season.

During the 2024 and 2025 seasons, the team's poor performance saw airplanes fly over MetLife Stadium during games with messages including "fix this dumpster fire" and "fire everyone".

=== Additional work in NFL ===
Mara has served for 15 years on the NFL Competition Committee, which suggests rule and policy changes to all NFL teams. He is the current chairman of the NFL Management Council Executive Committee. He played an important role in the negotiations for the 2011 and 2020 collective bargaining agreements.

Mara, alongside Steve Tisch and Woody Johnson, brought Super Bowl XLVIII to MetLife Stadium in February 2014.

== Personal life ==
Mara is the third generation of his family to own the Giants. His grandfather, Tim, founded the team in 1925. Tim's sons, Wellington and Jack (John's uncle), inherited the team in 1959, when Tim died. Among NFL franchises, only the Chicago Bears (controlled by the Halas-McCaskey family since 1921) have been in the hands of one family longer than the Giants.

He and his wife, Denise W. Mara, married in 1980 and have one son, John Jr., and four daughters, Lauren, Courtney, Christine, and Erin. He is an uncle to actresses Rooney Mara and Kate Mara.

Mara serves on the board of directors of Saint Vincent's Hospital in Harrison, New York, and Boys Hope Girls Hope of New York.

=== Health ===
On September 29, 2025, Mara revealed that he had been diagnosed with an undisclosed form of cancer.

Sporting positions
Preceded by Wellington Mara; Preston Robert Tisch	New York Giants principal owner 2005–present Served alongside: Steve Tisch (2005–2025)	Incumbent
