= Wellington Mara =

American businessman (1916–2005)

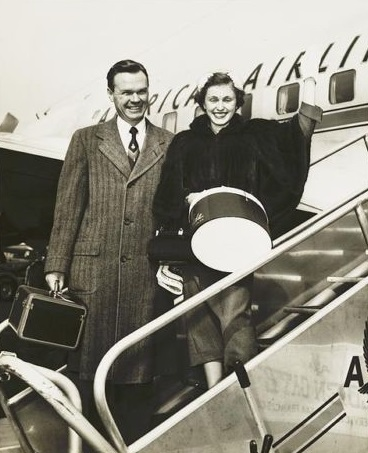
- Mara and wife Ann in 1954

Profile
- Positions: Owner/President/ General Manager

Personal information
- Born: August 14, 1916; Rochester, New York, U.S.
- Died: October 25, 2005 (aged 89); Rye, New York, U.S.

Career information
- High school: Loyola (New York City)
- College: Fordham

Career history
- New York Giants (1959–2005) Owner/President

Awards and highlights
- 2× Super Bowl champion (XXI, XXV); 4× NFL champion (1927, 1934, 1938, 1956); New York Giants Ring of Honor; New Jersey Hall of Fame
- Military career
- Allegiance: United States
- Branch: United States Navy
- Service years: 1943–1946
- Rank: Lieutenant commander
- Conflicts: World War II
- Pro Football Hall of Fame

Wellington Timothy Mara (August 14, 1916 – October 25, 2005) was an American professional football executive. He was the co-owner of the New York Giants of the National Football League (NFL) from 1959 until his death. He was the younger son of Tim Mara, who founded the Giants in 1925. Wellington was a ball boy that year.

== Life and career ==
Mara was born in Rochester, New York, the son of Tim Mara and Elizabeth "Lizette" Mara (née Barclay). He was of Irish descent. Mara was an alumnus of Loyola School and Fordham University, both Catholic, Jesuit schools in New York City.

In 1930, Tim Mara split his ownership interests between Wellington (then 14) and his older brother Jack. Soon after graduating from Fordham University, Wellington moved into the Giants' front office as team treasurer and assistant to his father, and became the team's secretary in 1938. After fighting in World War II in the U.S. Navy, he returned to the Giants as team vice president, a post he retained after his father died in 1958. When Jack, who had been president since 1941, died of cancer at age 57 prior to the 1965 season, Wellington became team president.

For his first 37 years in the organization, he handled the franchise's football decisions. However, his growing involvement in league affairs led him to turn over most of his day-to-day responsibilities to operations director Andy Robustelli in 1974. Mara didn't relinquish full control over the football side of the operation until 1979, when George Young became the team's general manager.

The Giants were hamstrung for several years by a strained relationship between Wellington and his nephew Tim J. Mara, who inherited Jack's stake in the team. By the 1970s, they almost never spoke to each other, and a partition had to be built in the owners' box. The Maras continued to retain close control over the Giants' day-to-day operations long after most other owners had delegated such authority. Only the fallout from "The Fumble" in 1978, in which a certain Giant win turned into a loss to the Philadelphia Eagles on a last-second fumble, convinced the Maras of the need to modernize—among other things, by hiring Young and giving him full control over football operations.

Under Mara's direction, the Giants won six NFL titles (including two Super Bowl wins), nine conference championships (including six Eastern Conference championships in the days before the NFL-AFL merger and three NFC championships post-merger), and 13 division championships. An eighth NFL title, third and fourth Super Bowl victories, fifth NFC championship (11th conference championship overall), and 15th division title have been captured since his death under the leadership of his son, John, and co-owner Steve Tisch (who in turn is the son of Wellington's former co-owner from 1991 to 2005, Bob Tisch; Tisch also died in 2005, with his death coming three weeks after Mara's).

The Giants have also accumulated the third highest number of victories in National Football League history. Mara was also well liked by the Giants' players, and was known to stick by them even when they struggled with off-the-field problems. When Lawrence Taylor was inducted into the Pro Football Hall of Fame in 1999 he credited Mara for supporting him even during the worst times of his drug addiction saying, "He probably cared more about me as a person than he really should have." Taylor has since lived a clean life style and credits Mara with having helped him to fight his addiction. Wellington had surgery in May 2005 to remove cancerous lymph nodes from his neck and under his armpit, but was initially given a good prognosis by his doctors who said the cancer had not metastasized, according to his son, John Mara, the Giants' co-chief executive officer.

== Personal life ==
Mara was married to Ann Mara, and their granddaughters include actresses Kate Mara and Rooney Mara, and they also have a grandson, NHL player Patrick Brown.

== Honors ==
Wellington Mara was enshrined in the Pro Football Hall of Fame in 1997. In 2007, the University at Albany, where the Giants held training camp for many years, named their practice field after Mara and Bob Tisch. Mara was elected into the New Jersey Hall of Fame in 2012.

Not long after Mara came to work with the team, the players – many of whom were barely older than him – nicknamed him "Duke" because they knew he was named after the Duke of Wellington, whom his father called "the fightingest of all Irishmen," and the nickname stuck. The Wilson football used in NFL games prior to the AFL merger (1941–1969) was nicknamed "THE DUKE" after Mara; the ball was named as such by George Halas, the owner and head coach of the Chicago Bears, to reward Tim Mara for arranging the contract that made Wilson the official supplier of footballs to the NFL. Since the 2006 season, a new version of "THE DUKE" has been used in NFL games.

In total, Wellington Mara spent 81 seasons as a member of the Giants organization.

== Death ==
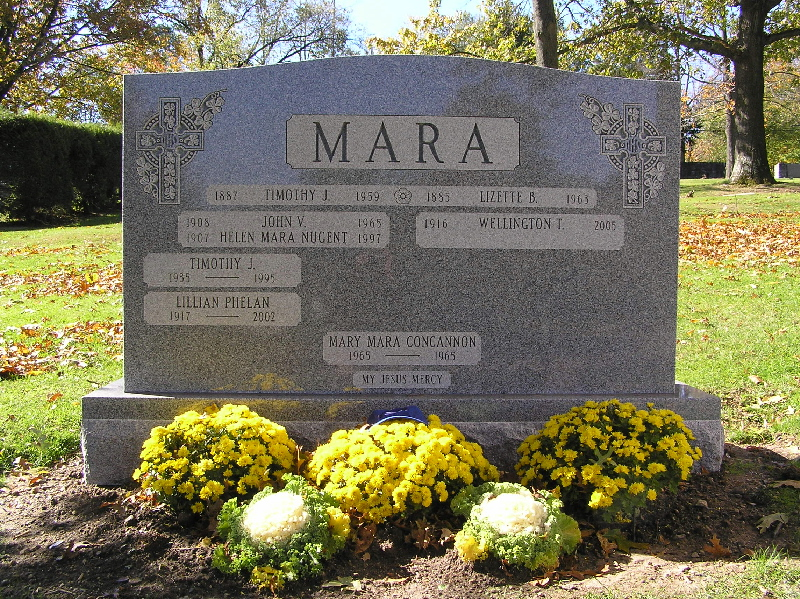
Mara's grave

Mara died of lymphoma at his home in October 2005 at age 89. After his funeral at Saint Patrick's Cathedral in Midtown Manhattan, he was buried at Gate of Heaven Cemetery in Hawthorne.

== See also ==
- History of the New York Giants
