= William Blount High School =

Public high school in Blount County, Tennessee, United States

Location
- 219 County Farm Road; Maryville, Tennessee 37801; United States; 35.7419°N 84.0343°W

Information
- Type: Public high school
- Motto: Latin: Lux Tua Via Mea (Your Light is My Way)
- Opened: 1979; 47 years ago
- Status: Continuing
- School district: Blount County Schools
- CEEB code: 431306
- NCES School ID: 470030001830
- Principal: Patrick Bethel
- Staff: 95.04 (on an FTE basis)
- Grades: 9–12
- Gender: Coeducational
- Enrollment: 1,545 (2022–2023)
- Student to teacher ratio: 16.26
- Campus size: approx. 150 acres (61 ha)
- Campus type: Suburban
- Colors: Orange and blue
- Athletics conference: Tennessee Secondary School Athletic Association
- Mascot: The Governor
- Nickname: Governors & Lady Governors
- Rivals: Alcoa Tornadoes; Heritage Mountaineers; Maryville Red Rebels
- Accreditation: AdvancED
- Newspaper: The Governors' Press
- Yearbook: The Governor
- Feeder schools: Carpenters Middle School; Union Grove Middle School
- Website: williamblount.blountk12.org

William Blount High School (WBHS) is a four-year public American high school located approximately 4.6 miles (7.4 km) from Maryville in Blount County, Tennessee. Established in 1979 and named for Tennessee's territorial governor, WBHS is the largest of four high schools in the Blount County Schools public school district.

== History ==
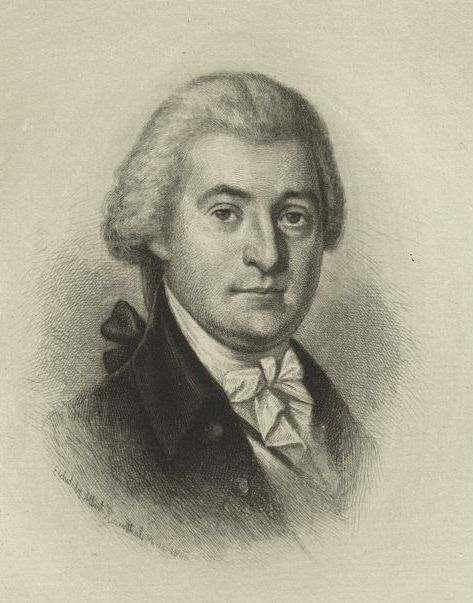
Portrait of William Blount by Albert Rosenthal

In the 1970s, Blount County Schools decided to consolidate its existing high schools into two new comprehensive high schools. The first of the two new high schools, Heritage High School, opened in 1977, consolidating the former Porter, Townsend, and Walland high schools and some former Everett high school students.

The second consolidated high school was initially referred to as the "new south high school." In 1977, Blount County Board of Education member Lois Coleman proposed and the Board unanimously agreed to name the new south high school after William Blount, an American Founding Father, signer of the United States Constitution, and, as the only governor of the Southwest Territory, a key leader in the territory's admission to the Union as the State of Tennessee.

WBHS opened in 1979, consolidating the former Friendsville and Lanier high schools and some former Everett high school students.

In addition to the newly-constructed WBHS main building, the former Blount Occupational Education Center building, built in 1973, became the WBHS vocational building, later referred to as the career and technical education building.

In 1989, Blount County Schools opened Mary Blount Elementary School on a campus adjoining WBHS. The district subsequently converted the elementary school into a middle school, which was named William Blount Middle School. In 2008, the district closed the middle school, and its building became the WBHS ninth grade academy building.

In 1990, WBHS adopted its official flag. The flag's design incorporates the WBHS school colors (orange and blue) alongside the colors of its predecessor high schools: Everett (blue and gray), Friendsville (navy and white), and Lanier (green and yellow).

In 1992, a memorial courtyard was dedicated outside the main building to honor those who died while attending or employed at WBHS. By 2012, the names of more than 30 students, faculty, and staff had been added to the memorial.

In 1998, student Abby Darden and teacher Patricia Lane were killed and approximately 20 students were injured in a bus accident on Interstate 40 while returning from an academic fair. The WBHS auditorium was subsequently named the Patricia B. Lane Theatre.

In 2022, WBHS completed a nearly $1.8 million renovation of its main building science wing.

== Demographics ==
As of 2026, the WBHS student body consisted of 1,478 students. The racial makeup of the student body was %62.8 White, 3.3% Black, 0.6% Asian, 0.29% Native American, 0.1% American Indian/Alaska Native, 0.1% Native Hawaiian/Pacific Islander, and 2.6% from two or more races. 10% of the student body were Hispanic.

== Academics ==
WBHS's academic program is organized on a rotating block schedule. Five credits per semester is the maximum course load. Students take five 67-minute block classes and attend a 25-minute academic enrichment each day. Most university preparatory and honors level courses and all Advanced Placement courses are two-credit, year-long courses, while all other courses are one-credit, semester-long courses.

WBHS offers Advanced Placement courses and exams in biology, calculus, chemistry, computer science, English language and composition, English literature and composition, human geography, physics, statistics, and United States history.

WBHS offers career and technical education programs of study in aerospace science (via the Air Force Junior ROTC program), agriculture, automative repair, business, coding and cybersecurity, construction, cosmetology, criminal justice, culinary arts, digital arts and design, engineering technology, health sciences, interior design, mechatronics, social health services, teaching, and welding.

WBHS has dual enrollment partnerships with Maryville College, Pellissippi State Community College, Roane State Community College, and the Tennessee Colleges of Applied Technology.

Alongside students from Alcoa, Greenback, Heritage, and Maryville high schools, WBHS students are eligible to earn varsity-style letters for academic achievement in language arts, math, science, and social studies as part of the annual The Daily Times Academic Letters Awards Program.

== Activities ==
The WBHS student government is known as the student council.

WBHS student clubs include the Beta Club, biology club, debate team, drama club, Fellowship of Christian Athletes, Key Club, math club, Model United Nations club, outdoor adventure club, and Spanish Honor Society. Fine arts activities include the Governor Band (including a marching band, concert band, percussion ensembles, flag corps, and winter guard), the Singers choir and Cadence show choir, and the Vagabond Players theatre troupe.

Career and technical student organizations include DECA, Family, Career, and Community Leaders of America, FFA, Future Business Leaders of America, HOSA – Future Health Professionals, and SkillsUSA.

WBHS hosts an Air Force Junior ROTC unit, which includes the Flying Knights drill team.

Since 1979, WBHS has excelled in Roane State's annual Academic Festival. Each year, as many as 200 WBHS students compete against students from across East Tennessee in a variety of humanities and science disciplines. As of 2016, the WBHS team won first place in 20 of the previous 26 years and placed in the top three every year other than one year.

== Athletics ==
The WBHS athletic teams are nicknamed the Governors and the Lady Governors (sometimes shortened to "Govs" and "Lady Govs"). Their crosstown/in-county rivals are the Alcoa Tornadoes, the Heritage Mountaineers, and the Maryville Red Rebels.

As part of the Tennessee Secondary School Athletic Association (TSSAA), WBHS fields teams in baseball, basketball, bowling, cross country, football, golf, soccer, softball, tennis, track and field, volleyball, and wrestling. As part of the Tennessee Girls Lacrosse Association, WBHS also fields a Lady's lacrosse team. In addition, WBHS fields cheerleading and dance teams.

WBHS won TSSAA state championships in the Class AAA girls' 3200 meter run in 1996, the Class AAA girls' shot put in 2000, the Class AAA boys' decathlon in 2001 and 2002, the Class AAA girls' 100-meter high hurdles and girls' pentathlon in 2007, Division 1 220 Weight Class boys' wrestling in 2013, 105 Weight Class girls' wrestling in 2017, and 103 Weight Class girls' wrestling in 2018.

The annual football rivalry game between the Governors and the Heritage Mountaineers is known as the "Battle of the Bell" and, as of 2020, has been played every year since 1979. In addition to playing the Mountaineers each year, the Governors football team schedule includes annual games against the Dobyns-Bennett Indians, Clinton Dragons, Hardin Valley Hawks, Jefferson County Patriots, Karns Beavers, Morristown East Hurricanes, Science Hill Hilltoppers, Sevier County Smoky Bears, and West Ridge Wolves.

Former Major League Baseball pitcher Charlie Puleo coached the Governors baseball team from 2000 to 2007 and again from 2009 to 2011. In 2012, the WBHS baseball field was named Charlie Puleo Field.

== See also ==
- Blount County Schools
- List of high schools in Tennessee
