= Bicentennial Greenbelt Park =

Park in Maryville, Tennessee

Coordinates: 35.75784°N 83.97165°W

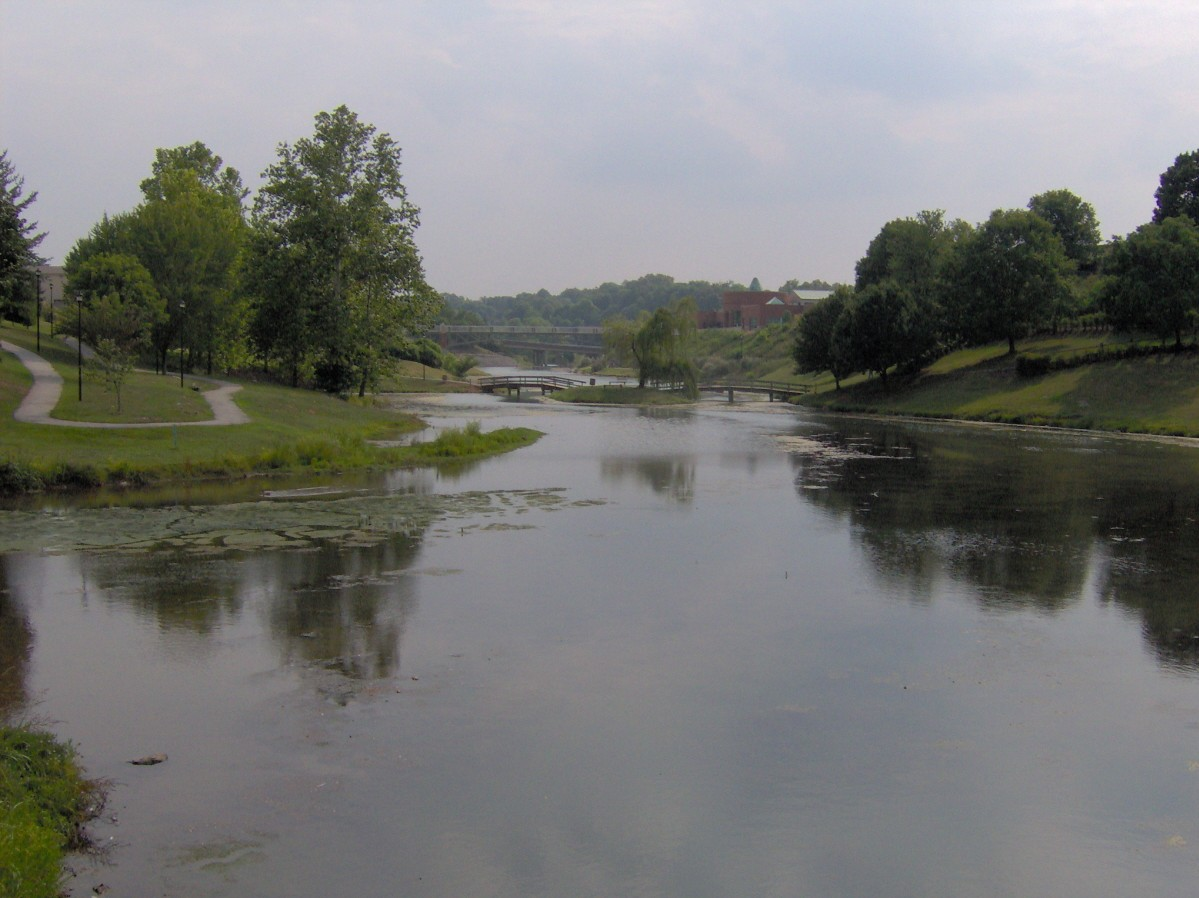
Bicentennial Greenbelt Park

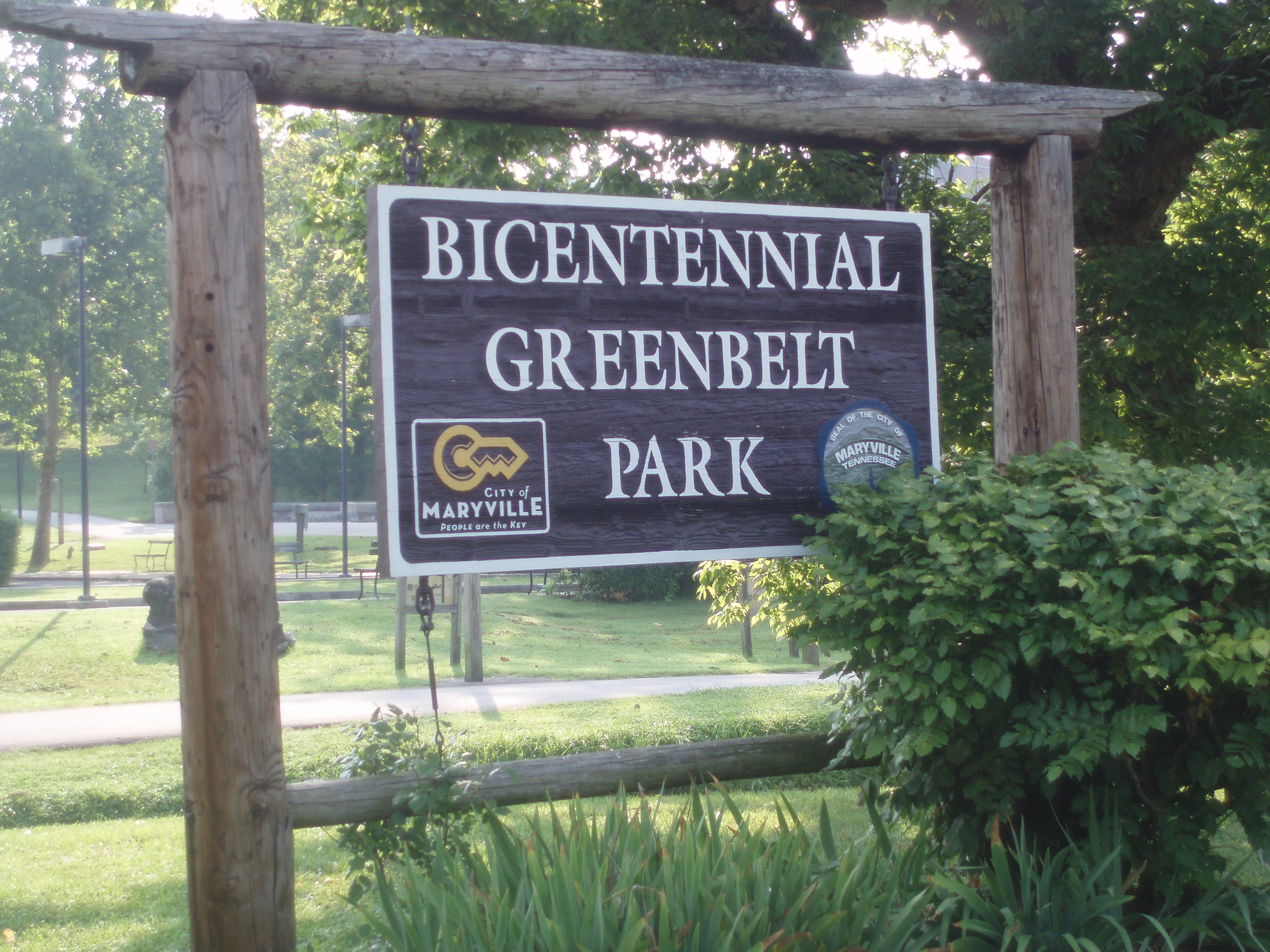
Park sign

Bicentennial Greenbelt Park is a public park located in downtown Maryville, Tennessee.

== History ==
Bicentennial Park was an urban renewal project of the City of Maryville during the period leading up to the US Bicentennial in 1976.

The intent was to redevelop an area that had been home to light industrial activity and heavy pollution into a green space with walkways, picnic tables and an exercise course. The heavily polluted Pistol Creek was a key factor in the determination by the city to redevelop the area. The Bicentennial Park was built utilizing local funds and Federal Community Development Block Grant funds. Bicentennial Park was dedicated on July 4, 1976.

The development of Bicentennial Park changed the complexion and character of the entire area. The initial walkways became the nexus of the Maryville Alcoa Greenway and the park itself became known locally as the Greenbelt.

Between the period 1976 and 2007, the area surrounding Bicentennial Park began to grow and rejuvenate, with residential, commercial and public service development occurring at a slow but steady pace.

Not long after completion, Canada geese stopped at Bicentennial Park on migration, and a small flock has remained at Bicentennial Park since that time.

In 1996, the City Maryville celebrated its 200th anniversary with the dedication of two monuments in the Bicentennial Park (Greenbelt).

In 1999, the first phase of the Maryville Alcoa Greenway was completed which included all of the former walkways in Bicentennial Park.

In 2002, the Blount County Library was opened, bordering Bicentennial Park. In 2007, a bridge was built across Bicentennial Park from downtown Maryville to the Blount County Library.
