= Freedmen's Normal Institute =

Defunct school in Maryville, Tennessee

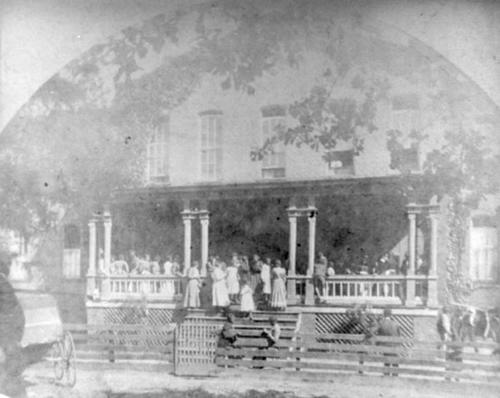
- A group on the front porch of the Institute in Maryville

Location
- Maryville, Tennessee; 35.7482°N 83.9801°W

Information
- Established: 1873
- Closed: 1901

Freedmen's Normal Institute was a school in Maryville, Tennessee in Eastern Tennessee established to train African American teachers.

== History ==
The school was built in 1872 and opened in 1873. It was co-founded by newspaper publisher William Bennett Scott Sr., Thomas B. Lillard Sr., others, and support from Quakers. The Friends Church (Maryville, Tennessee) had a role in establishing the school.

The University of Tennessee has a photo of a group on its porch and another of some pupils. A historical marker commemorates the school.

The school closed in 1901.

== Alumni ==
Charles Warner Cansler attended the school.
