= Pistol Creek =

Coordinates: 35.8189721°N 83.9412927°W

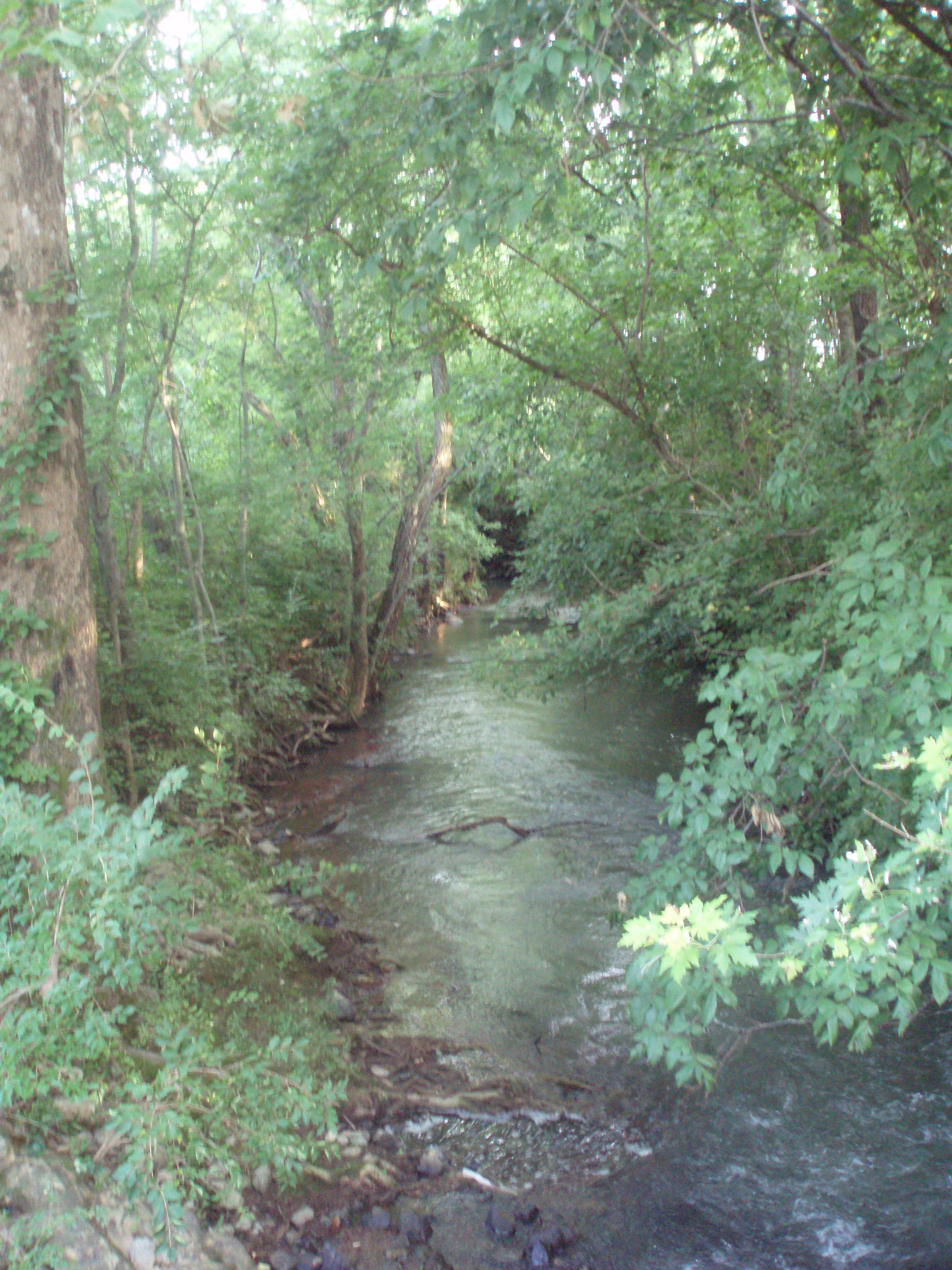
Pistol Creek in Alcoa, Tennessee

Pistol Creek is a 13-mile-long (21 km) tributary of the Little River, located entirely within Blount County, Tennessee.

== Features ==
Pistol Creek arises from several springs in the Carpenter's Campground section of Blount County, flowing first northeast, then northwest to Pearson Springs within the city of Maryville. At Pearson Springs, the Maryville Alcoa Greenway begins to parallel Pistol Creek, which then flows east through Pearson Springs Park and Sandy Springs Park. On the south side of Maryville, the creek passes the ruins of an early 20th-century dam and mill race that are listed on the National Register of Historic Places. Further downstream it passes Fort Craig spring, site of Maryville's founding settlement. It then hooks around the downtown area and contributes, along with Brown Creek, to the impounded Greenbelt Lake on the north side of town. From the Greenbelt, it flows north into Alcoa and joins the Little River a mile south of Rockford.

Pistol Creek, after a survey by the Tennessee Department of Environment and Conservation, was considered to be impaired due to E.Coli and siltation.

== See also ==
- List of rivers of Tennessee
