= Charles W. Cansler =

American educator, civil rights advocate and author

Charles Cansler
- Born: May 15, 1871; Maryville, Tennessee, US
- Died: November 1, 1953 (aged 82); Knoxville, Tennessee, US
- Education: Freedmen's Normal Institute (Friendsville, Tennessee)
- Occupation: Educator
- Political party: Republican
- Spouse: Lillian Webber
- Parent(s): Hugh Lawson Cansler and Laura Scott

Charles Warner Cansler (May 15, 1871 – November 1, 1953) was an American educator, civil rights advocate, and author, active primarily in Knoxville, Tennessee, US. A grandson of William Scott, a pioneering African-American publisher, and the son of Knoxville's first Black American teacher, Cansler was instrumental in establishing educational opportunities for Knoxville's Black American children in the late 19th and early 20th centuries. His 1940 biography, Three Generations: The Story of a Colored Family in Eastern Tennessee, remains an important account of black life in 19th century East Tennessee.

== Biography ==
=== Background and early life ===
Cansler was born in Maryville, Tennessee, in 1871, a son of Hugh Lawson Cansler (originally spelled "Gentzler" ) and Laura Scott. Cansler's father was the son of a plantation slave and the plantation owner's daughter Catherine Cansler. Cansler's maternal grandfather, William Scott (1821–1885), had moved to Friendsville in 1847 at the request of the town's Quaker leaders. At the outbreak of the Civil War, the Scotts moved to Knoxville, which offered better protection from pro-Confederate guerrillas, who often targeted free blacks.

While in Knoxville, Cansler's mother attended a school for black children established by St. John's Episcopal Church rector, Thomas William Humes. In 1864, she became Knoxville's first Negro teacher when she received permission to open a school from Ambrose Burnside, commander of the occupying Union forces. In August 1865, William Scott moved to Nashville, where he founded The Colored Tennessean, the state's first newspaper published and edited by a Negro. Two years later, he returned to Maryville, where he published the pro-Radical Republican Maryville Republican, and in 1869 served as the city's only black mayor.

Charles Cansler studied at the Quaker-sponsored Freedmen's Normal Institute. He later attended Maryville College, one of the few integrated colleges in the South, but he quit before graduating. In the early 1890s, Cansler worked at different jobs for the railroad and the federal government, but disheartened by discrimination, he began studying law under Knox County judge William Kain. He passed the bar in 1892.

=== Political and education career ===
In 1894, Cansler ran unsuccessfully for the Tennessee state legislature. He attended the Republican National Convention in 1896, and was present at President William McKinley's inaugural festivities in Washington, D.C., in 1897. By the end of the decade, he tired of his law practice and focused his efforts on educating Knoxville's Negro children.

In 1900, Cansler joined the teaching staff at Austin High School, one of Knoxville's schools for African-American students, and in 1911 became its principal. His students included future artist Beauford Delaney (1901–1979), who while a student is said to have drawn a portrait of Cansler that "looked just like him." Cansler organized the East Tennessee Association of Colored Teachers in 1912, and established a night school in Knoxville in 1914.

A mathematical genius, Cansler gave demonstrations in which he would calculate large columns of numbers faster than adding machines. He used the funds raised to finance school projects. He published two booklets in which he explained how he added numbers so quickly.

In 1917, Cansler was instrumental in obtaining Carnegie library funds for the establishment of the Knoxville Free Colored Library for the city's black residents. He retired from teaching in 1939, and wrote his book, Three Generations: The Story of a Colored Family in Eastern Tennessee, the following year. He later provided the chapter on Knox County's Black American community in the East Tennessee Historical Society's book, The French Broad-Holston Country: A History of Knox County, Tennessee. After Cansler died in 1953, a large memorial service was held in his honor at Knoxville College's McMillan Chapel.

== Legacy ==
Cansler Street, in Knoxville's Mechanicsville neighborhood, is named for Cansler, as is the Charles W. Cansler Family YMCA in East Knoxville. Cansler Elementary School, which operated in Knoxville through much of the 20th century, was named for Cansler's mother, Laura Scott Cansler.

== See also ==
- William F. Yardley
- Isaac L. Anderson
- Cal Johnson
- James Herman Robinson
