= Heritage High School (Blount County, Tennessee) =

Public high school in Maryville, Tennessee, USA

Location
- 3741 East Lamar Alexander Parkway; Maryville, Tennessee 37804; United States
- 35.763°N 83.862°W

Information
- Type: Public Secondary
- Opened: 1977
- School district: Blount County Schools
- Principal: Jed West
- Staff: 72.50 (FTE)
- Faculty: 104
- Grades: 9-12
- Enrollment: 1,061 (2023–2024)
- Student to teacher ratio: 14.63
- Colors: Scarlet and Columbia blue
- Nickname: Mountaineers
- Accreditation: Southern Association of Colleges and Schools (SACS)
- Website: https://heritagehigh.blountk12.org/o/heritagehigh

Heritage High School is a public high school located approximately 3.5 miles (5.6 km) outside the city of Maryville, in Blount County, Tennessee, USA, which opened in 1977. It was created through the consolidation of four community high schools (Townsend, Walland, Porter and Everett) into a comprehensive high school.

Heritage High School is one of two secondary schools operated by Blount County Schools. Two other public high schools in Blount County that are operated by the cities of Maryville and Alcoa.

The school provides education primarily to students from Townsend, Walland, Louisville, Rockford and Alcoa communities.

In the 2009–2010 school year, the student population at Heritage was 94.62% White, 2.84% Latino, 1.87% African-American, 0.06% Native Hawaiian-Pacific Islander, and 0.42% Asian.

== Campus ==
The high school occupies a 99 acres (40 ha) campus within 15 miles (24 km) of the Great Smoky Mountains National Park.

There are scenic views of the park's peaks and nearby Walland Gap that divides the Chilhowee Mountain range into two sections.

Heritage High School occupies two main educational buildings. The Main school building consists of three two-story academic wings containing counseling and office suites, a sizable common area, theater, gymnasium with locker rooms and additional class space for physical education, art and band along the gymnasium perimeter. A covered walkway leads to the vocational education building with large class space for vocational training programs.

Athletic facilities include the James D. Lillard Field/Jack Renfro Stadium utilized for American football and track & field. Additional athletic facilities include a soccer field, side-by-side baseball and softball facilities, exterior hard tennis courts and a large gymnasium used for basketball, volleyball and wrestling competition. Located adjacent to stadium is the Wilbur Shoun Athletic Fieldhouse used primarily for weight training.

Also present on campus is the Heritage Planetarium whose programs were utilized by local schools and general public. The Planetarium is attached by breezeway to the main school building. The planetarium was closed on September 23, 2010, following conflict between Director Thomas Webber and Blount County School Board on the Planetarium's direction, budget and the director's salary reduction. As of March 25, 2024, there are no current plans to reopen the facility as Webber resigned his position.

== Faculty ==
Heritage's faculty consists of 104 members. 1% of the faculty possess Ed. D. Degree, 16% have an Ed. S. degree, 5% have a master's degree+45, 47% have a master's degree and the remaining 31% have a bachelor's degree.

== Student life ==
Most students begin their class day at 8:30am. As Heritage utilizes block scheduling, there are five 70-minute class periods per school day. Before the school 2011-2012 year, the block schedule used four 90-minute class periods.

There is an early class option for seniors who wish to graduate early or need extra credit to graduate on time. These early classes begin at 7:00am and end at 8:00am.

In 2006, Blount County Schools created a freshman academy at Heritage High School that provides faculty and administrative personnel solely devoted to first-year student development.

The Heritage High School marching band, known as the Marching Mountaineers, earns superior ratings at most competitions. The band program hosts the annual Volunteer Classic Band Festival every October at James D. Lillard Field/ Jack Renfro Stadium.

== Sports ==
Heritage competes primarily in the Tennessee Secondary School Athletic Association in the largest division in each sport. The Mountaineers and Lady Mountaineers field teams in:

- American football
- Baseball
- Basketball
- Bowling
- Cross country
- Golf
- Soccer
- Softball
- Swimming
- Tennis
- Track and field
- Volleyball
- Wrestling
- Lacrosse
- Colorguard

== Extracurricular activities ==
Heritage has numerous state and nationally recognized clubs and organizations, including:

- 4-H
- United States Air Force Junior ROTC
- Band (both marching and concert)
- Cheerleading
- Choir (both men's, women's, acapella Vocal Impact, and Honors Heritage Singers)
- Computer Club
- Distributive Education Clubs of America
- Future Business Leaders of America
- Fellowship of Christian Athletes
- FCCLA
- Future Farmers of America
- Key Club
- National Beta Club
- Speech and Drama
- Yearbook
- HOSA
- National Honor Society
- Youth in Government
- Skills USA
- Student Council
- United States Academic Decathlon/Academic Bowl

== Notable alumni ==
- Jennifer Higdon, Grammy and Pulitzer Prize-winning classical composer
- Melanie Hutsell, actress and Saturday Night Live alumna
