= Blount High School =

Blount High School may refer to:

- Mattie T. Blount High School, Eight Mile, Alabama
- William Blount High School, Blount County, Tennessee
