= Sandy Springs Park =

Public park in Maryville, Tennessee

Coordinates: 35.73994°N 83.97487°W

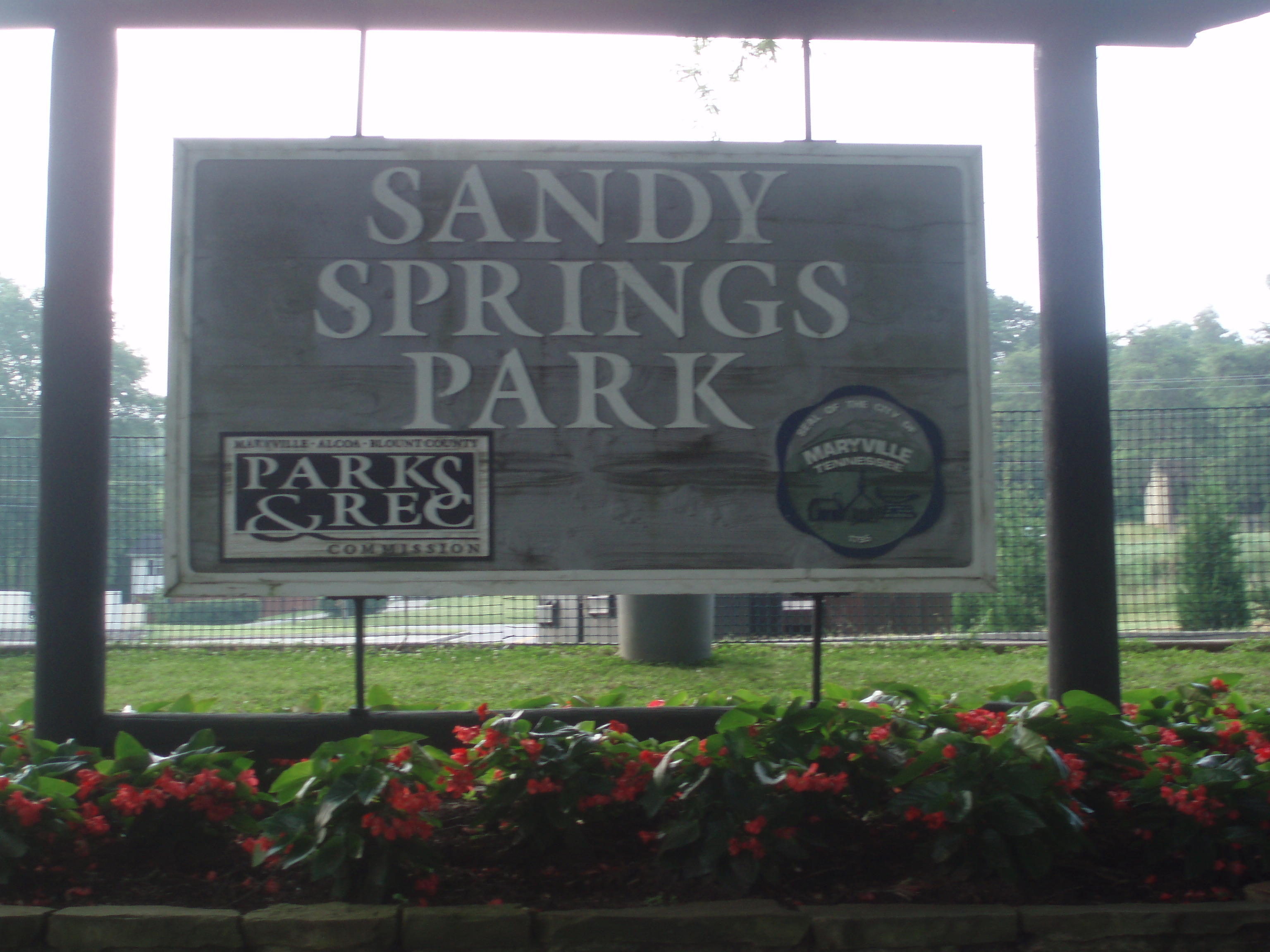
Sandy Springs Park

Sandy Springs Park is a public park located in Maryville, Tennessee.

== Location ==
Sandy Springs Park is bound on the southwest by Best Street, on the northeast by Cedar Street, on northwest by Boyd Avenue and Willow Avenue, and on the southeast by Karrow Street, all within the City of Maryville, Tennessee. The park consists of 20 acres (81,000 m^{2}) bordering Pistol Creek. The park sits just behind Maryville Junior High School.

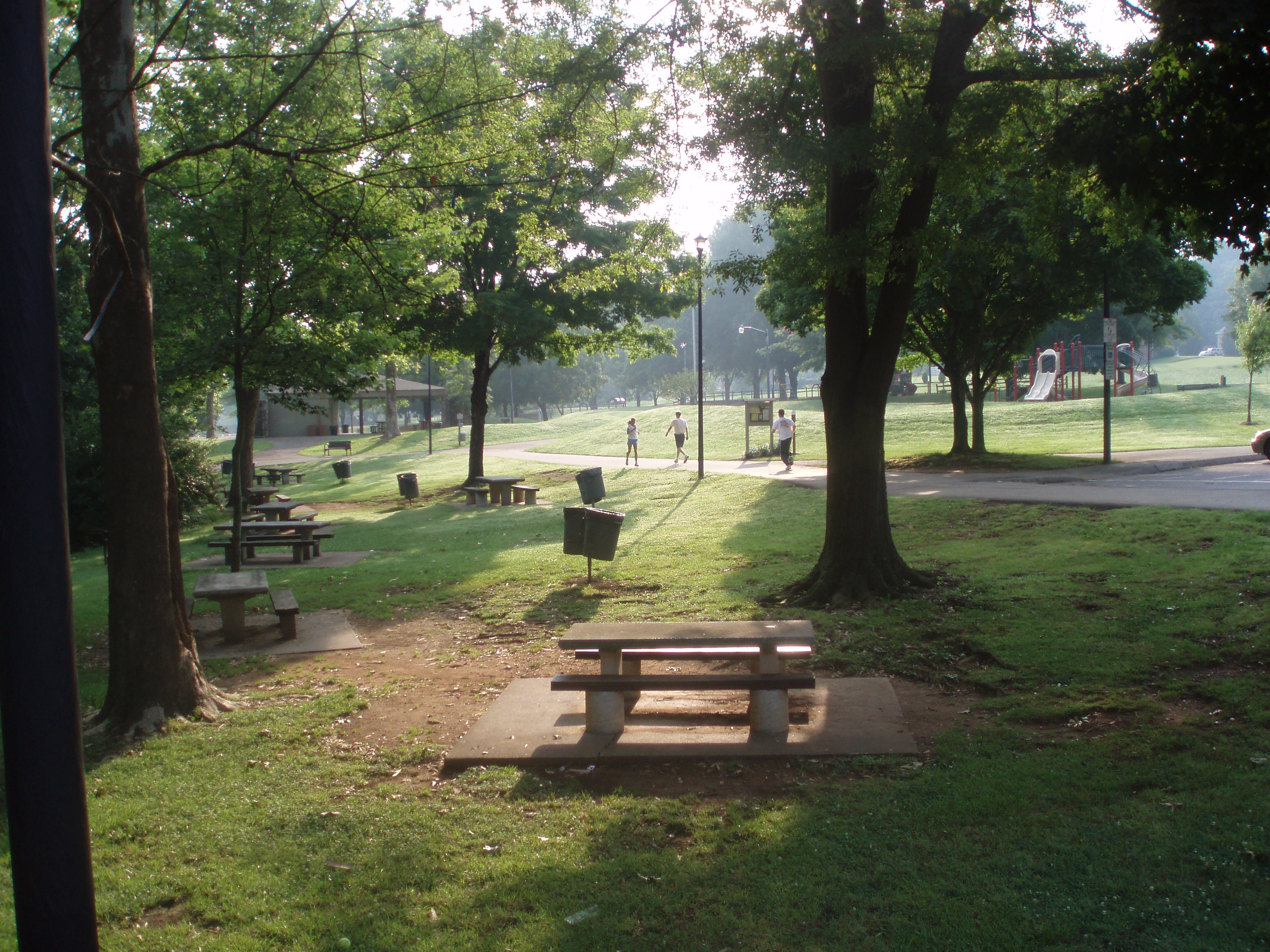
View of Sandy Springs Park from Best Street

== Features ==
Sandy Springs features 1.7 miles (2.7 km) of the Maryville Alcoa Greenway, four lit tennis courts, two lit basketball courts, three softball fields, two of which are lit, two playgrounds, fourteen picnic tables, and a six table pavilion.

Every year, Sandy Springs hosts the Smoky Mountain Classic softball tournament.
