= Blount County Schools =

School district in Tennessee, United States

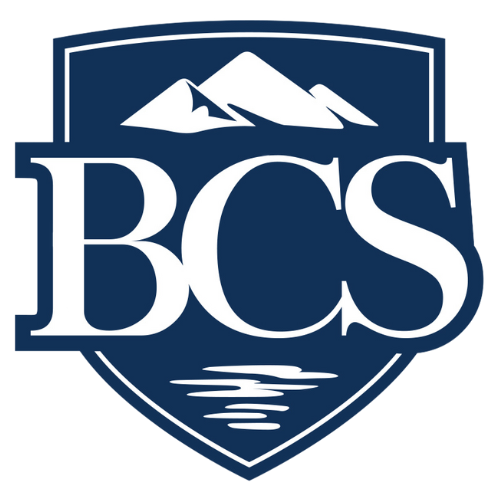

Address
- 831 Grandview Drive Maryville, Blount County, Tennessee, 37803; United States
- Coordinates: 35°45′05″N 83°56′11″W

District information
- Established: 1867; 159 years ago
- NCES District ID: 4700300

Students and staff
- Enrollment: 10,091 (2025-2026)
- Staff: 1,900
- Athletic conference: TSSAA

Other information
- Website: www.blountk12.org

Blount County Schools (BCS) is a school district in Blount County, Tennessee, United States. The district has 20 schools with 1200 teachers, 600 administrators serving approximately 10,100 students.

The district includes all unincorporated areas and all municipalities except for Maryville and most of Alcoa.

Communities in the district boundary include: Eagleton Village, Friendsville, Greenback, Happy Valley, Louisville, Rockford, Seymour, Tallassee, Townsend, Walland & Wildwood.

== History ==
In 2022 the board of trustees made David Murrell the director (superintendent) of the school system.

On December 7th, 2023, Blount County Schools and their board of trustees unveiled their new logo for the school system. This change was driven by their "Blount County Strong" initiative to emphasize its commitment to students' success through diverse opportunities and community support. This branding is reinforced by a new logo featuring mountains (representing strength) and water ripples (representing multiple pathways for students).

On April 21st, 2025, following the resignation of previous Director of Schools David Murrell, the Blount County Schools board of directors voted unanimously to elect the founder and now former Samuel Everett School of Innovation principal Mr. Justin Ridge as the new Director of Schools. According to Blount County Schools, Mr. Ridge brings a wealth of knowledge and experience to the roll, being a product of the Blount County School system and having been with the district in leadership positions for many years.

== Schools ==
Below is a list of schools in the system, grouped by high school and feeder schools, followed by enrollment figures, mascot, and the year built.

- Heritage High School 879 (Mountaineers) 1977
  - Heritage Middle School 626 (Mountaineers) 1991
    - Montvale Elementary 275 (Knights) 1984
    - Porter Elementary 256 (Panthers) 1806/1918
    - Prospect Elementary 289 (Cubs) 2011
    - Townsend Elementary 99 (Tigers) 1993
    - Walland Elementary 279 (Indians) 1963
- William Blount High School 1,077 (Governors) 1979
  - William Blount 9th Grade Academy 350 (Governors) 1989
    - Carpenters Middle School 543 (Cougars) 2001
      - Carpenters Elementary 560 (Cougars) 2006
      - Fairview Elementary 302 (Angels) 1952
      - Lanier Elementary 315 (Eagles) 1922
    - Union Grove Middle School 639 (Wildcats) 2008
      - Friendsville Elementary 200 (Falcons) 1919
      - Mary Blount Elementary 590 (Bears) 1989
      - Middlesettlements Elementary 370 (Settlers) 1981
      - Union Grove Elementary 209 (Bobcats) 2008
- Eagleton College and Career Academy 885 (Royals) 2021
  - Eagleton Elementary 516 (Ravens) 1962
  - Rockford Elementary 398 (Tigers) 1919
- Samuel Everett School of Innovation 434 (Bulldogs) 1977

Throughout the 1980s, the school system undertook a program of school consolidation, particularly for elementary schools. The result was larger, more comprehensive schools. The consolidation led to the closing of several smaller and community schools.

- Former Schools
  - Alnwick School
  - Binfield School
  - Bungalow School
  - Chilhowee View School
  - Forest Hill School
  - Hubbard School
  - Louisville School
  - Mentor School
  - Rush Strong School
  - Rocky Branch Elementary
  - Union Elementary

== See also ==
- List of high schools in Tennessee
