= Maryville Alcoa Greenway =

Coordinates: 35.7801°N 83.9851°W

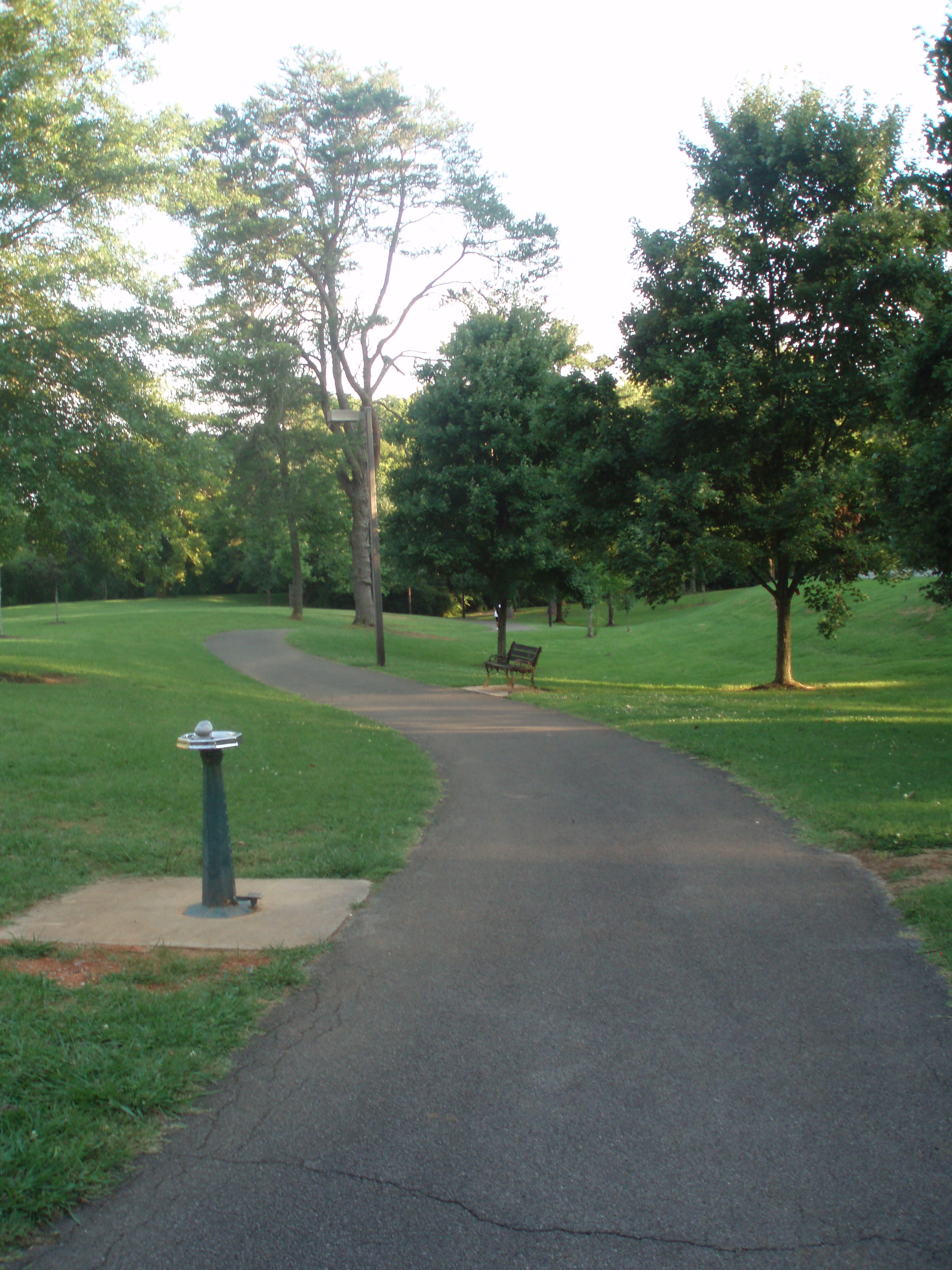
Maryville Alcoa Greenway at Springbrook Park

The Maryville Alcoa Greenway is a cooperative effort by the two cities and Blount County, Tennessee to connect existing parks with a paved foot and cycle path.

== History ==
The city of Maryville initially developed its Bicentennial Greenbelt Park by clearing part of its downtown and damming Pistol Creek to flood the area. Alcoa had developed its own Springbrook Park. In 1996 efforts to connect the parks began. In early 1996 the two cities were successful in obtaining an $850,000 grant of Intermodal Surface Transportation Efficiency Act (ISTEA) for the Greenway.

Between 1996 and 1998 the two parks were connected by a three-mile (5 km) extension entirely within the city of Alcoa. During the same period Maryville extended the Greenway from the Greenbelt to the Maryville Intermediate School. On October 15, 1998 the Maryville Alcoa Greenway was dedicated.

The Greenway was immediately well received by the public and by early 1999 plans were already underway for extensions. The result was Alcoa extended a spur through the Springbrook Corporate Center. The two cities also completed an eastern connector between the Greenbelt and Springbrook Park.

Today the Greenway is well lighted and marked, providing numerous opportunities for picnics, play, and exercise while connecting the two cities and providing a nine-mile linear recreational facility.

== Alcoa Main (4 miles) ==
Beginning at Mile Marker 0 (the line between Maryville and Alcoa), the Greenway proceeds north for 1.5 miles (2.4 km) to the Springbrook Corporate Center Spur, then east to the Alcoa Duck Pond at mile 3, then north through Springbrook Park to Hunt Road, ending at mile 4.

== Green Meadows Spur (1 mile) ==
Beginning at mile 1.5 the spur extends 1-mile (1.6 km) through the Springbrook Corporate Center crossing US 129. On December 22, 2010, a bridge over US 129 funded by ARRA was completed which permits access to the Green Meadows community.

== East Connector (2.5 miles) ==
The East Connector begins at mile 3 on the Alcoa Main and heads south 2.5 miles (4.0 km), following the edge of the Alcoa Aluminum plant, crossing into Maryville at 1.5 miles (2.4 km) and connecting to the Greenbelt Park 1-mile (1.6 km) from mile marker 0.

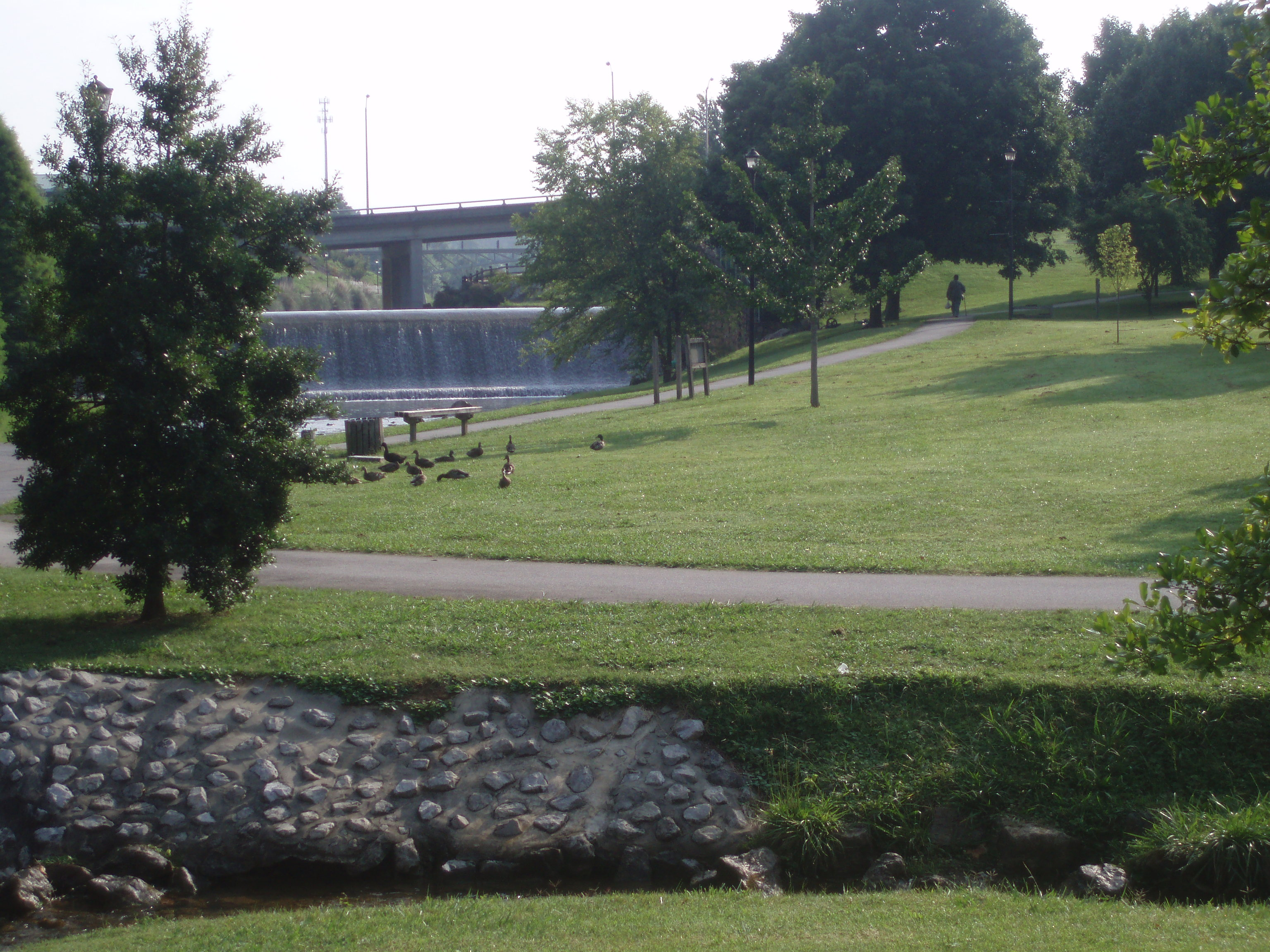
Maryville Alcoa Greenway at Bicentennial Park (Greenbelt) Park

== Maryville (4 miles) ==
Beginning at Mile Marker 0 (the line between Maryville and Alcoa), the Greenway heads south, then west through the Bicentennial Park (Greenbelt) and back east to the Charles West Amphitheater, adjacent to the old Courthouse at mile marker 1. The Greenway heads southeast across US 321 and Montvale Road connecting with Sandy Springs Park at

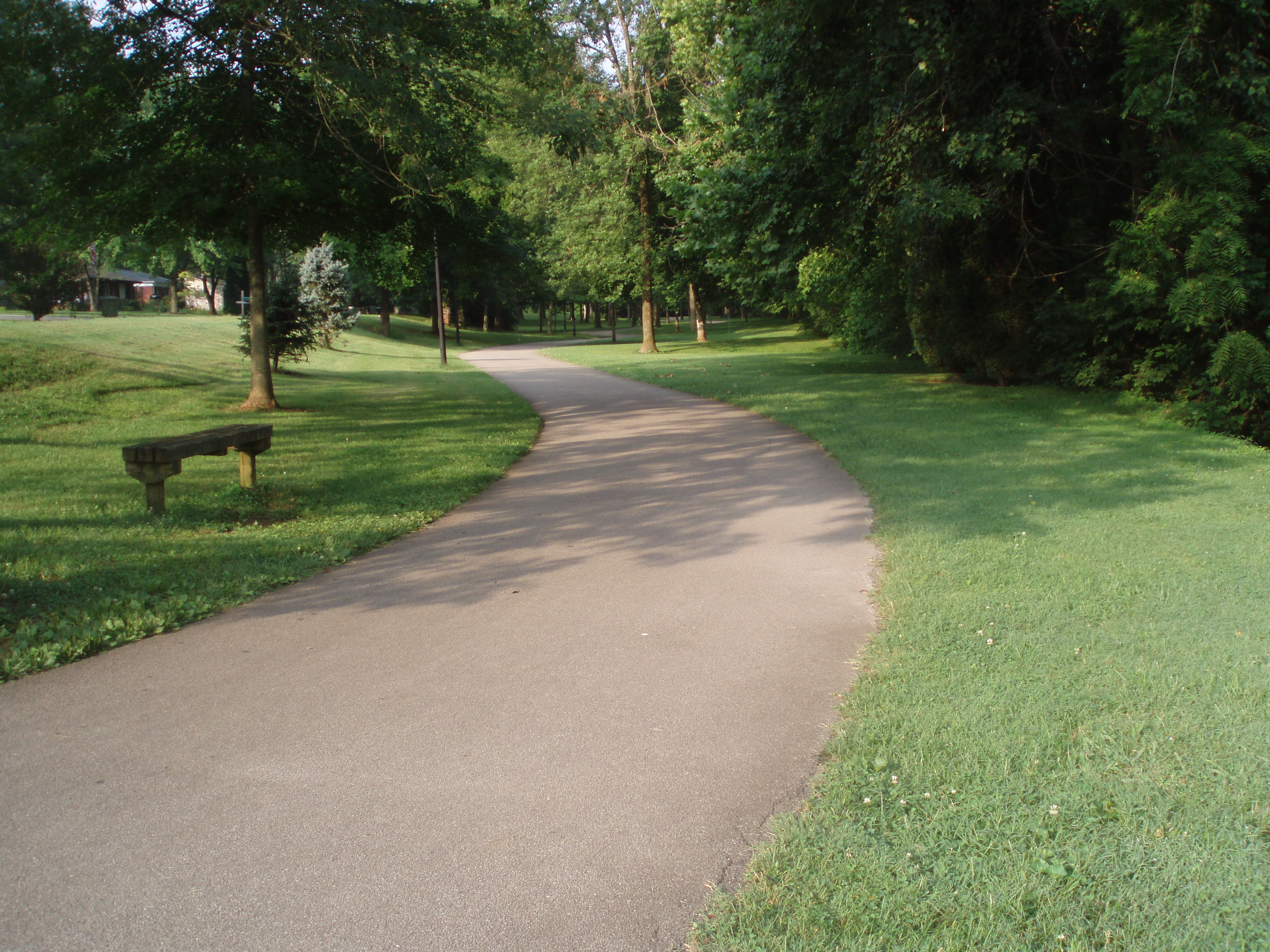
Maryville Alcoa Greenway at Sandy Springs Park

2.5 miles (4.0 km). The Greenway then heads east to Pearson Springs Park at mile 3.5 and the Maryville Intermediate School at mile 4
