= Friends Church (Maryville, Tennessee) =

Historic church in Tennessee, United States

- U.S. National Register of Historic Places
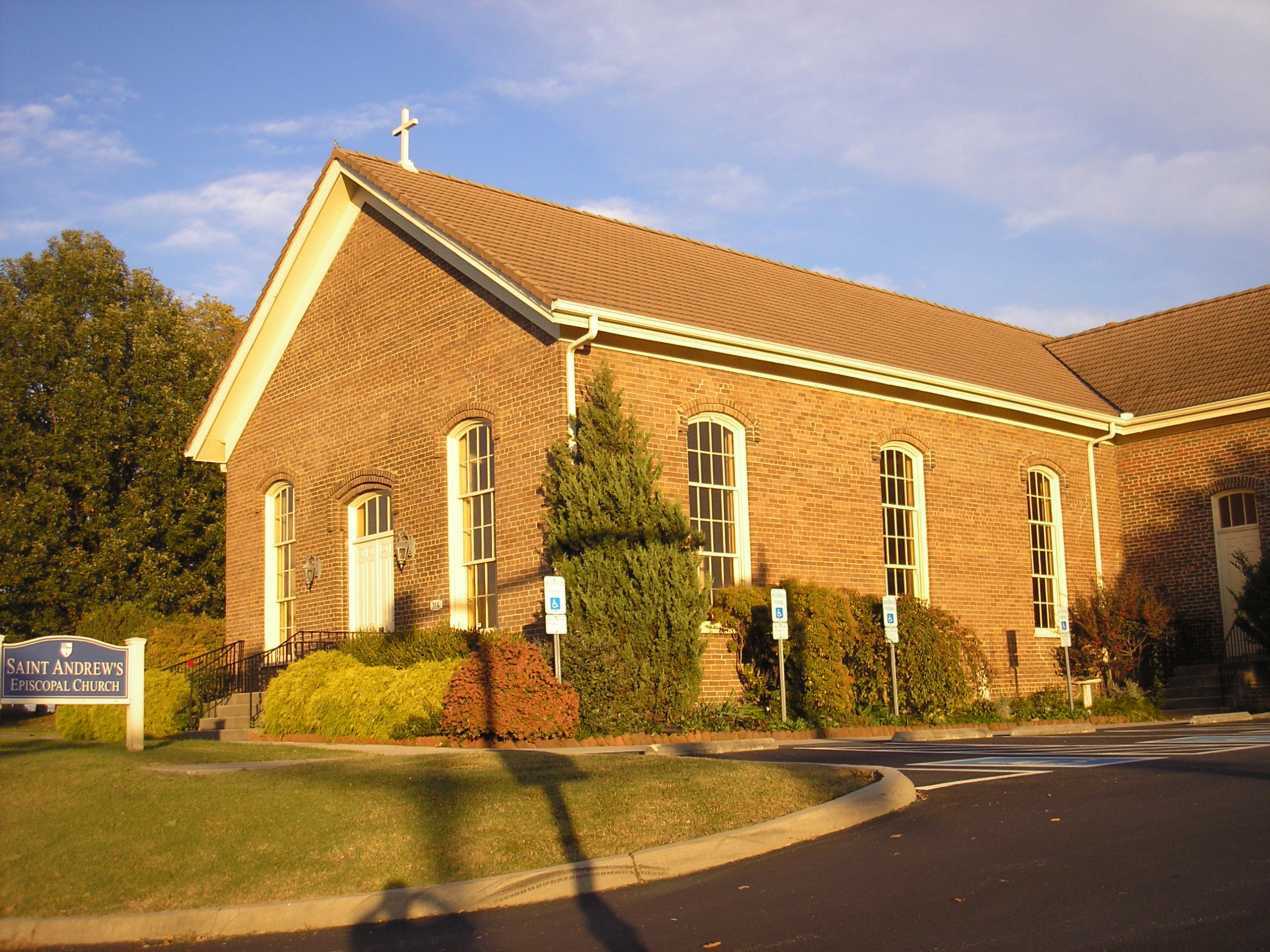

- Location within Tennessee Location within the United States
- Location: 314 W. Broadway, Maryville, Tennessee, U.S.
- Coordinates: 35°45′11″N 83°58′25″W
- Area: less than one acre
- Built: 1871
- Architectural style: Italianate
- MPS: Blount County MPS
- NRHP reference No.: 89000879
- Added to NRHP: July 25, 1989

Friends Church is a historic church at 314 W. Broadway in Maryville, in the U.S. state of Tennessee.

It was built in 1871 as a meetinghouse for the local congregation of the Society of Friends (Quakers). The Quakers were an important group in Maryville in the 19th century that played a major role in building the community's early schools, including the Freedman's Institute and Maryville Normal School. The single-story brick church is of Italianate design and is laid out on an ell plan.

Since 1940 the building has been used for Episcopal worship. It currently houses St. Andrew's Episcopal Church.

It is the oldest brick church in Blount County, and was listed on the National Register of Historic Places in 1989. It became a Blount County historic landmark in 2007.
