= Little River (Tennessee) =

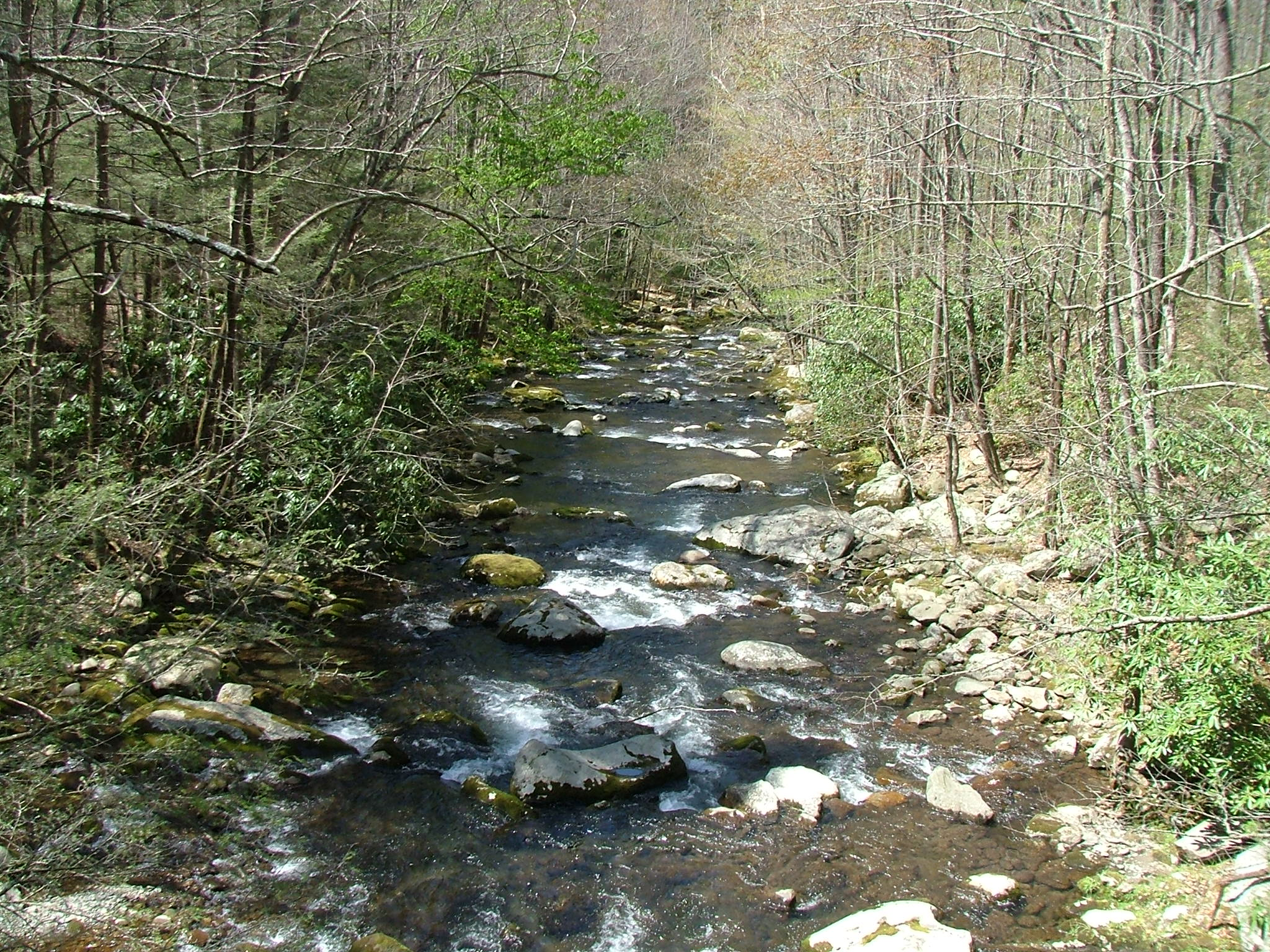
- Middle Prong near the confluence of Thunderhead and Lynn Prongs

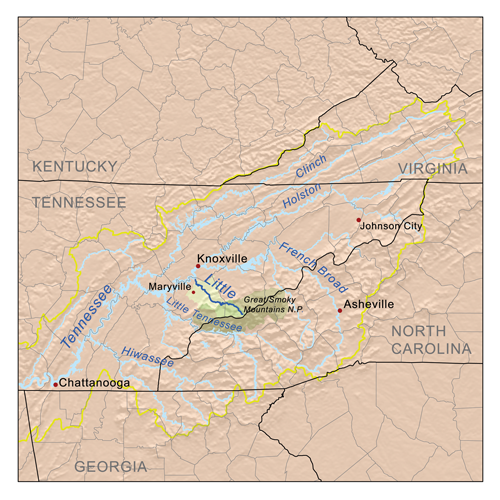
- Little River watershed

Location
- Country: United States
- State: Tennessee

Physical characteristics
- Source: near Collins Gap in the Great Smoky Mountains National Park
  - coordinates: 35°34′46″N 83°28′56″W
  - elevation: 5,100 ft (1,600 m)
- Mouth: Tennessee River at Blount County/Knox County line
  - coordinates: 35°52′40″N 83°59′12″W
  - elevation: 814 ft (248 m)
- Length: 60 mi (97 km)
- Basin size: 380 sq mi (980 km^{2})
- Discharge
  - location: Brabson Ford Bridge (Hwy. 411) east of Maryville, 17.3 miles (27.8 km) above the mouth(mean for water years 1951-2004)
  - average: 524 cu ft/s (14.8 m^{3}/s)(mean for water years 1951-2004)
  - minimum: 32 cu ft/s (0.91 m^{3}/s); August 1956
  - maximum: 50,000 cu ft/s (1,400 m^{3}/s); April 1875

Basin features
- Tributaries
  - left: Pistol Creek

Little River is a 60-mile (97 km) river in Tennessee which drains a 380-square-mile (980 km^{2}) area containing some of the most spectacular scenery in the southeastern United States. The first 18 miles (29 km) of the river are located within the borders of the Great Smoky Mountains National Park. For the remaining 42 miles (68 km), the Little flows out of the mountains through Blount County to join the Tennessee River at Fort Loudon Lake in Knox County.

== History, course and geology ==
Historically, the Little River lay in a region of contact between the Overhill Cherokee and the American colonies, later states, during the Cherokee–American wars that emerged from combined pressures of colonies' demands for settlement beyond the Proclamation Line of 1763 and loss of land by the Cherokee in their traditional homelands. In 1785, the self-proclaimed State of Franklin negotiated the Treaty of Dumplin Creek, which set a boundary with the Cherokee leader Aucoo of Chota and other Cherokee town chiefs whom Aucoo spoke on behalf of, at the ridge separating the Little River and Tennessee basins. In 1786, Houston's Station on the Little River was the site of assembly for a volunteer cavalry force, who, under the leadership of Governor John Sevier, a chief signatory of the Dumplin Creek treaty, rode to destroy three Cherokee towns in the vicinity of the Hiwassee River in retaliation for a Cherokee attack on a settler's house that killed two people north of the Holston River near present-day Knox County, beyond the boundary set by the Dumplin Creek treaty. (Note: Excerpt from the Treaty of Dumplin Creek: "It is agreed by us, the Warriors, Chiefs & representatives of the Cherokee Nation, that all the lands lying and being on the South side of the Holeson and French Broad Rivers, as far South as the ridge that divide the Waters of Little River from the Waters of Tenesee, That the same may be peaceably inhabited & Cultivated, Resided upon, enjoyed and inhabited by ... the white people.") Deep within Cherokee territory, the detachment withdrew after hearing rumors of a superior force approaching, perhaps organized by John Watts.

Further conflict between white settlers and the Cherokee, as well as with the Muscogee, precipitated a second treaty between the State of Franklin and the Cherokee, this time coerced by the State. The State's representatives claimed at a meeting with Cherokee chief Old Tassel on July 31, 1786 that the state of North Carolina had "sold us [the State of Franklin] all the country on the north side of Tennessee and Holston". Attempting to pacify the angry commissioners, Old Tassel replied that he would consult Cherokee leadership and the United States' Congress of the Confederation about the land claims, and emphasized that he did not have authority over the Cherokee who had allegedly murdered settlers in Kentucky. Confronting Old Tassel and Hanging Maw less than a week later at Coytoy, a Cherokee village on the mouth of the Holston River, the commissioners reiterated their demands, threatening retaliation against any attack of the Cherokee on the settlers and blaming the Cherokee for the deaths of Colonel John Donelson and Colonel William Christian. The Cherokee protested that William Christian, who was well regarded by them, had been killed after crossing the Ohio River by non-Cherokee, and that they had never heard of the Government of North Carolina selling land to the Republic of Franklin and had spoken with congressional representatives during the fall of 1785 who had given no information about the impending land claim. Nevertheless, desiring peace, Old Tassel and Hanging Maw signed their assent to the claim of the settlers to an island at the mouth of the Holston River, whose head would form a new boundary that extended again to the ridge between the Little River, the Tennessee River and the Holston River, but would now also extend north of the Tennessee River. They agreed to hand over to the settlers' authorities anyone who was accused of murdering one of the settlers.

The 1791 Treaty of Holston established the northeastern border of the Cherokee Nation with the United States of America at the ridge separating the Little River and Tennessee basins. In late 1791, Cherokee emissaries traveled to Philadelphia, America's then-capital, in part to request that settlers who had intruded south of the ridge be removed. Henry Knox, the secretary of war, supported this request, and also recommended moving troops from Georgia to the ridge to enforce the treaty's provisions. The 1791 border was reaffirmed in 1795 by a treaty signed in Philadelphia.

=== Source to Elkmont ===
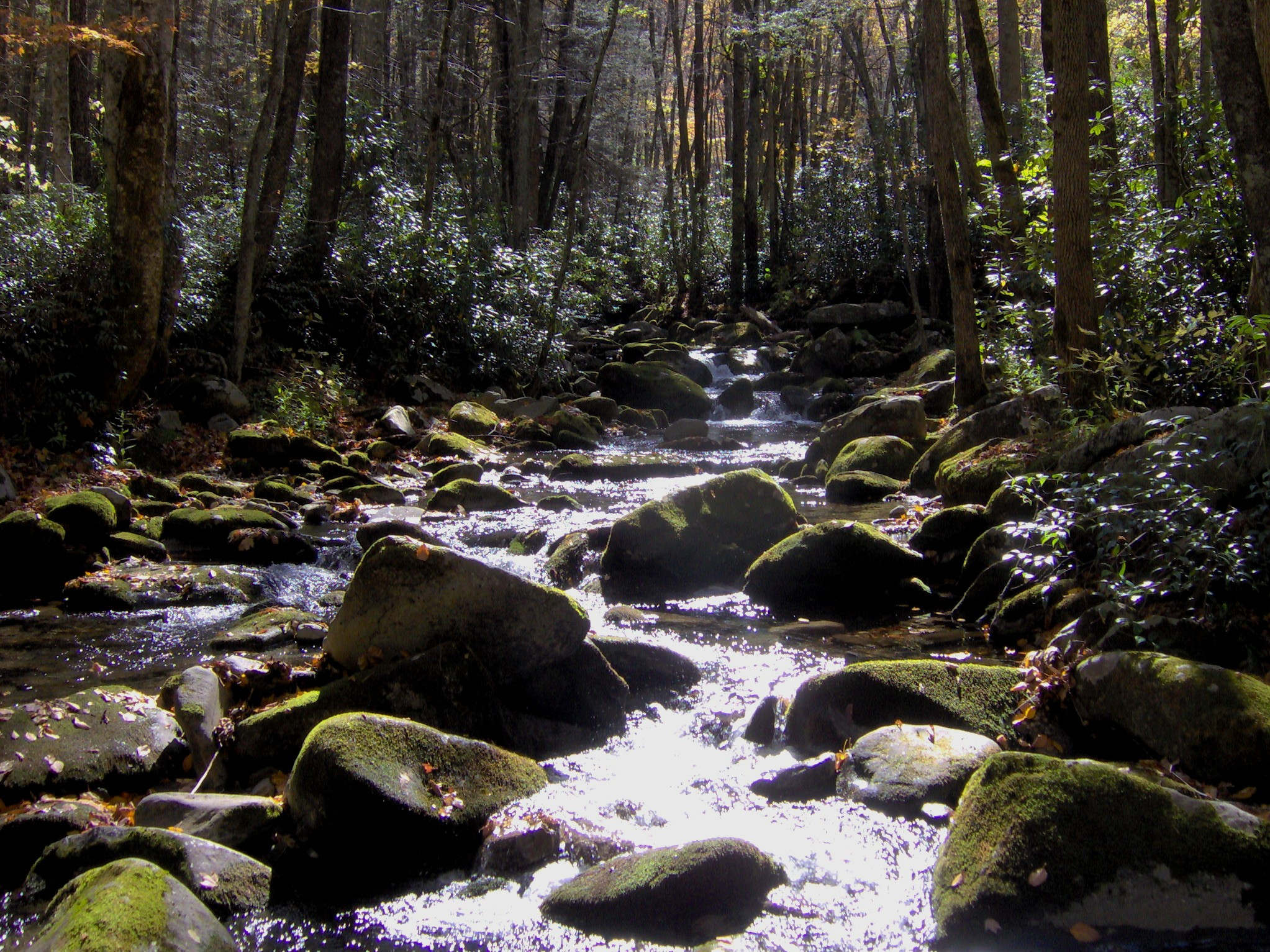
Little River at Three Forks, a mile or so below its source

Little River rises in Sevier County inside the national park on the north slope of Kuwohi, the highest point in Tennessee. Kuwohi is located directly on the Tennessee-North Carolina state line, which parallels the Appalachian Trail along the crest of the Smokies. Approximately one mile below its source, Little River absorbs several smaller streams at an area known as "Three Forks", where the river gains considerable strength. From here, the river is paralleled by the well-maintained Little River Trail which leads into Elkmont. Located in a valley created by Little River's confluence with Jakes Creek, Elkmont was originally a logging camp for the Little River Lumber Company and a station on the Little River Railroad. In the 1920s a series of cabins and inholdings, including the Wonderland Hotel, were leased to private citizens. The leases remained intact until 2001, when the last lease expired.

The road improves at Elkmont to become one which is easily suitable for most vehicles. This section of the river is navigable by expert kayak and canoe enthusiasts and offers excellent fishing for native brook trout.

=== Elkmont to the Townsend Y ===
From just below Elkmont, the Little River runs parallel to State Route 73, also known as Little River Gorge Road, which connects the two major Tennessee entrances to the Great Smoky Mountains National Park: those in Gatlinburg and Townsend. The stream, like the road that follows it, is quite sinuous. The road is built on the bed of the Little River Railroad that was used for logging purposes prior to the establishment of the park.

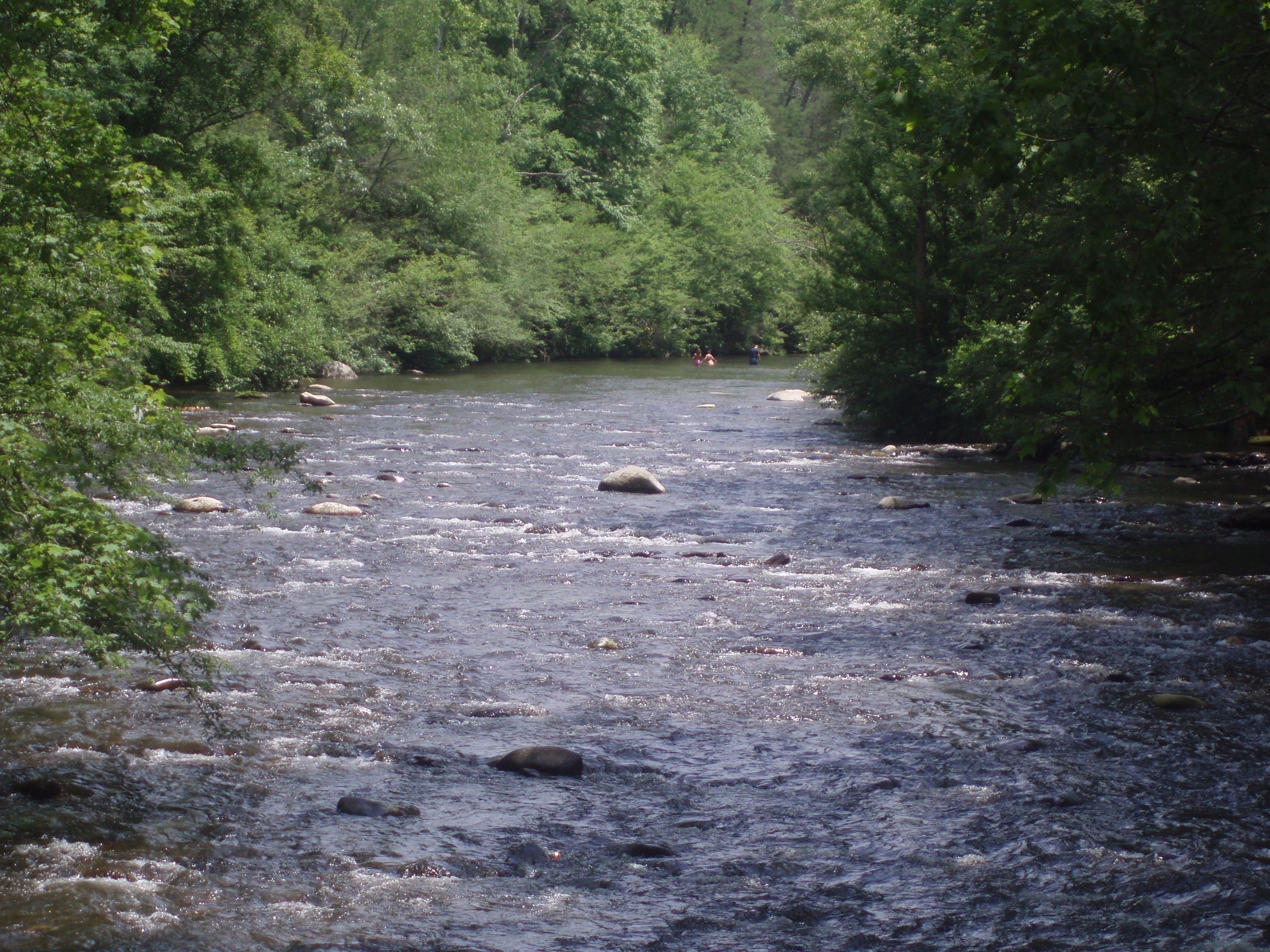
Little River at Metcalf Bottoms

Along the course of Little River are several small waterfalls which feed into the river, which are especially strong during wet weather. One waterfall, Meigs Falls, is visible from the road and is provided with a parking turnout. Additionally, there are parking turnouts for trails leading to numerous places. About midway between Gatlinburg and Townsend, Little River enters a relatively flat area known as Metcalf Bottoms, which developed along an oasis of soft phyllite amidst the more predominant sandstone. The park service has established a picnic area at Metcalf Bottoms, providing an attractive area for summer picnics and wading.

Just past Metcalf Bottoms, Little River becomes more rapid and volatile as it slices through Little River Gorge, a narrow valley between Round Top Mountain and Curry She Mountain. Among the gorge's more notable landmarks is an area known as "The Sinks." The Sinks is where the river flows over a ten-foot (three meters) waterfall into a large pool, and then seems to disappear for a small distance. (Unlike streams in a limestone area, which may actually "sink" for a considerable distance, this is more a question of appearance than of the stream truly "sinking", which is not feasible in this area of ancient Precambrian metamorphic rock.) Below the Sinks, Little River is navigable in high water with a canoe or kayak.

Continuing to follow TN 73 the stream crosses into Blount County en route to its confluence with Middle Prong of Little River at an area known as the "Townsend Y".

=== The Middle Prong ===
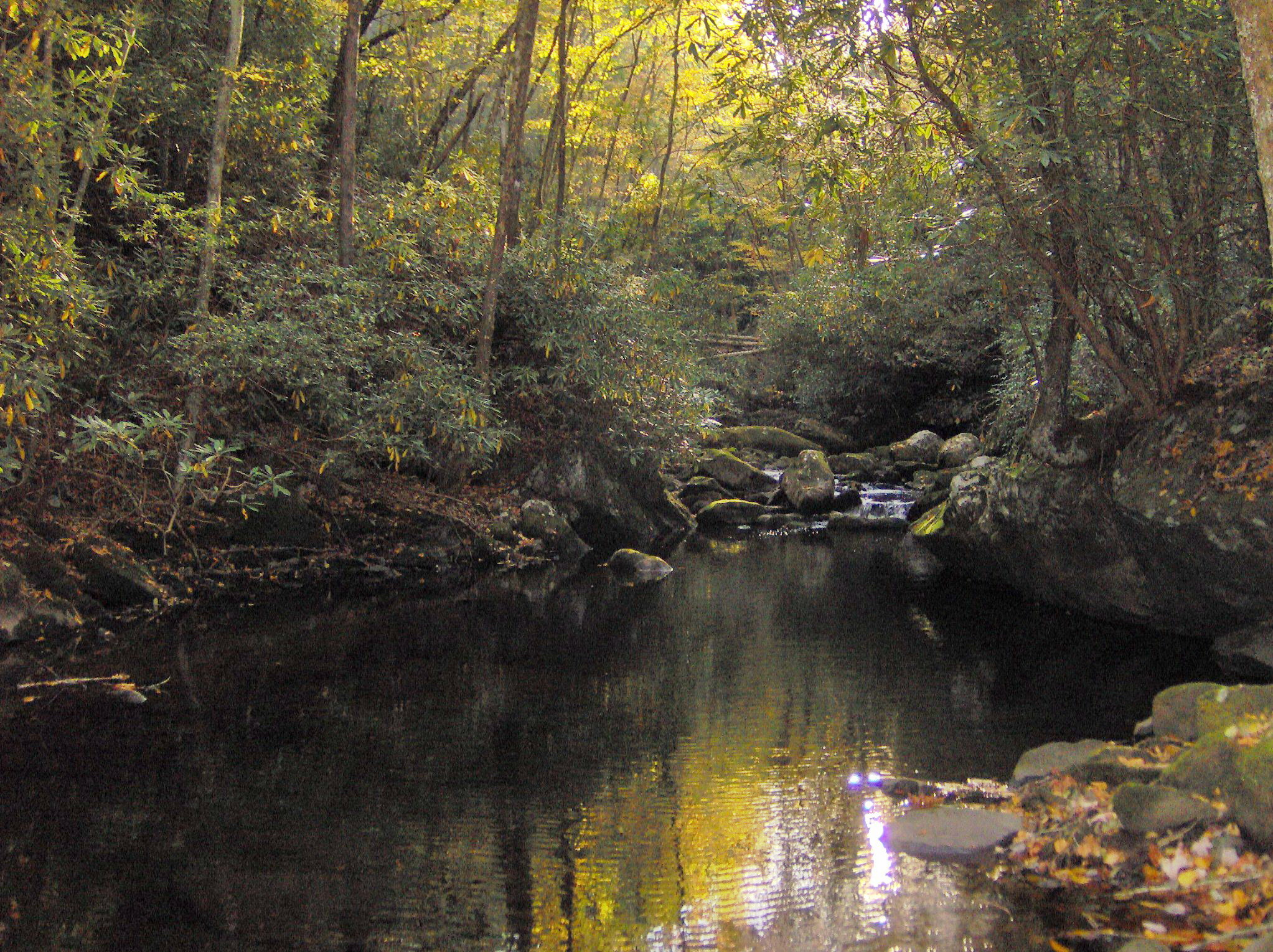
Lynn Camp Prong, just above its confluence with Thunderhead Prong

The Middle Prong of Little River drains the watershed between Miry Ridge and Defeat Ridge, both of which descend from the crest of the Smokies. The Middle Prong is formed by the confluence of Lynn Camp Prong and Thunderhead Prong at the former logging town of Tremont, where it has cut a deep gorge. From here, the river continues northward, absorbing Spruce Flats Branch and several smaller streams before steadying in a relatively flat area known as Walker Valley. The Middle Prong is shadowed by the old roadbed of the Little River Railroad for almost all of its nine-mile (14 km) length.

Laurel Creek, which drains the White Oak Sink area, joins the West Prong, which drains the area beneath Spence Field. The West Prong then joins the Middle Prong a mile east of the Townsend Wye at the junction of Tremont Road and Laurel Creek Road.

Only the stream below the Great Smoky Mountains Institute at Tremont is navigable by kayak in high water. Fishing along Middle Prong is considered excellent.

=== Townsend Wye to Walland ===
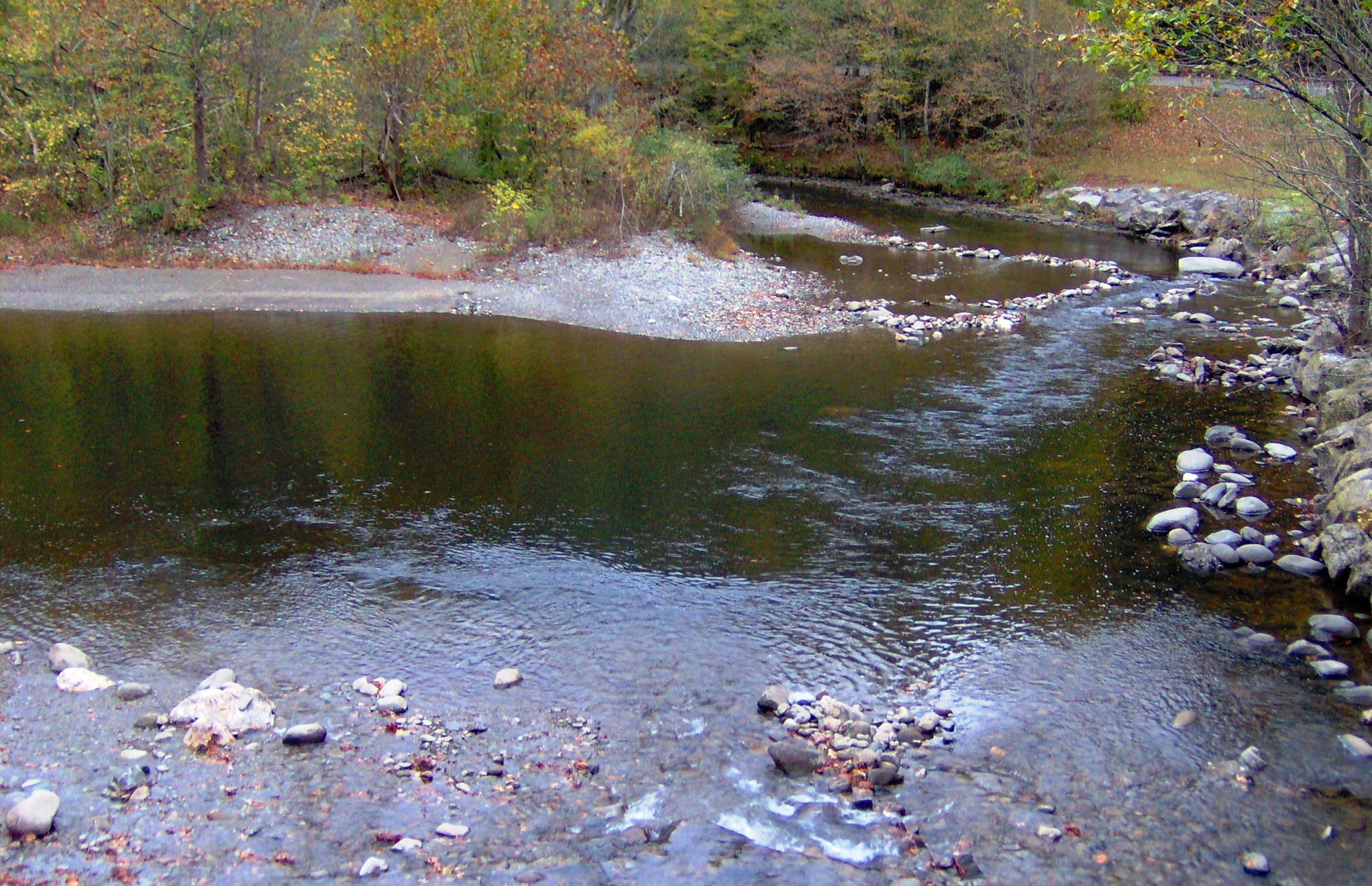
The Townsend Wye, created as Little River (top right) absorbs Middle Prong (bottom) and turns north (left)

The Townsend 'Y' is created by the confluence of Little River (flowing from the east) and Middle Prong of Little River (flowing from the west), which create a powerful stream that flows north. The Townsend Y is a popular swimming hole in the summer and is generally packed with cars and people. Many tubers use the Y as the jumping off point for a mile long float down the river. Just past the Y, Little River exits the Great Smoky Mountains National Park into Tuckaleechee Cove and Townsend. From this point forward, with the exception of two old mill dams, the Little River can be navigated in a kayak at normal water levels. Tubers typically travel from the Townsend Y to the vicinity of the first mill dam (above the Highway 321 bridge). This portion of the river has intermittent rapids and swimming areas, as well as large rocks in the middle of the river (such as Gallaher Rock near Cedar Bluff Way) that are suitable to rest at.

In Townsend, the river is paralleled by U.S. Highway 321. Townsend is situated in Tuckaleechee Cove, a Paleozoic limestone area noted by the presence of Tuckaleechee Caverns, a large cave operated as a tourist attraction during the tourist season, roughly defined as April to October. The drainage from the cave enters the Little River just below Townsend.

Townsend is laid out in the cove along the Little River valley. Three decades ago it was largely undeveloped, with a few small "mom and pop" style hotels and restaurants; now major chains have built larger lodging facilities, although not yet comparable to Gatlinburg or Pigeon Forge. Of interest are the Little River Railroad and Lumber Company Museum and the Greenway that parallels U.S 321. The Townsend area was once the site of many scenic swinging bridges over Little River; liability concerns have caused most of these to be dismantled in recent years. One bridge does remain, however, at the northern end of Townsend in an area known as Kinzel Springs. A second swinging bridge is located near the LRRR&LC Museum and connects to Dark Island.

Little River continues to flow north through Miller Cove into the small community of Walland, which is at the current time the eastern terminus of the Chilhowee section of Foothills Parkway, a national parkway.

=== Walland to Fort Loudon Lake ===
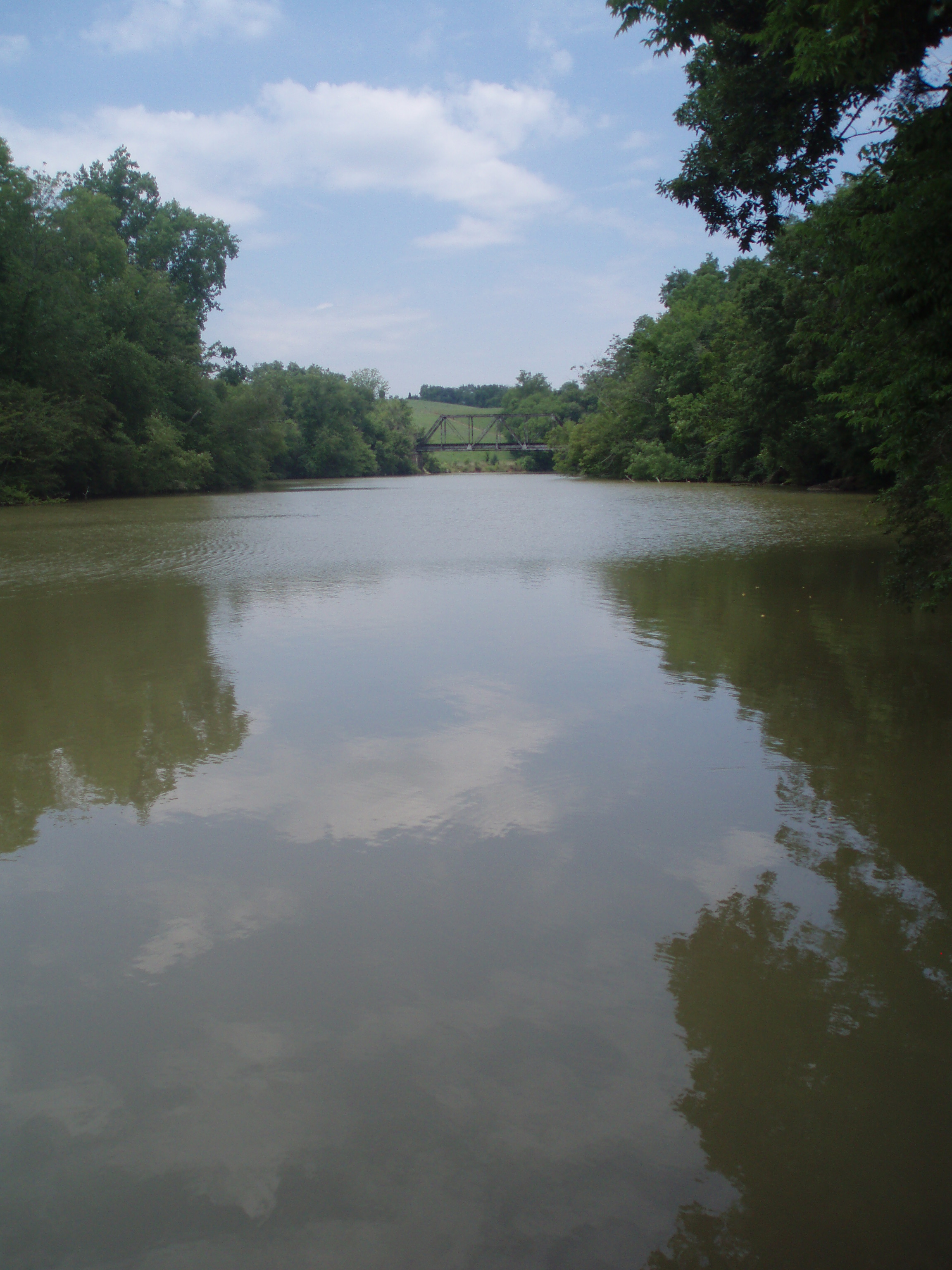
Little River below Rockford

Beyond Walland, Little River cuts a wide gap in Chilhowee Mountain before descending into the Maryville-Alcoa flatlands. As it steadies, the river no longer displays the extreme clarity and attractive rocky bottom of its upper reaches and resembles a more typical stream in a moderately rolling, somewhat rural area. From the old mill dam at the Peery's Mill site north of Walland to the river's mouth at Ft. Loudoun Lake (approximately 19 miles), the river is generally navigable with a canoe, with the exception of a dangerous low-head dam at the Rockford Manufacturing Company in Rockford. Little River flows through farmland, under U.S. Highway 411, and passes through the cities of Maryville and Alcoa before reaching Rockford.

Approximately 85,000 residents of these communities draw drinking water from the river. Three creeks— Pistol Creek, Short Creek and Crooked Creek— join Little River in this area. These three creeks are considered "impaired", contributing to a designation of Little River as "threatened" by the Tennessee Department of Environment and Conservation. Little River flows into a surprisingly large (given the size of the stream) embayment of the Fort Loudon Lake impoundment of the Tennessee River along U.S. Highway 129, where a small marina is located. Little River forms the line between Blount County and Knox County for the last few miles of its course.

== See also ==
- List of rivers of Tennessee
