= Mike Matzek =

American gymnast

- Born: July 27, 1965 (age 61) Maryville, Tennessee
- Height: 5 ft 1 in (1.5 m)

Gymnastics career
- Discipline: Men's artistic gymnastics
- Country represented: United States (USA)
- College team: Stanford University

Mike Matzek (born July 27, 1965) is a gymnast. Matzek attended Stanford University, and was an NCAA All-American on the rings.

== Early years ==
Matzek was born in 1965. He attended Maryville High School in Maryville, Tennessee, and conducted his workouts at Maryville College under coach Pat Dial. Mike Matzek was Tennessee Gymnastics State Champion for six years. He graduated from high school in 1984.

== College career ==
Matzek received an athletic scholarship to attend the Stanford University in Stanford, California, and was a member of the Stanford's Men's Gymnastics team from 1984-1988. He won the 19 and under National Championship held at Ohio State University in 1985 and finished seventh at the NCAA Nationals that same year. He finished third at the NCAA Nationals in 1986, and fourth in the 1988 NCAA Nationals. He was co-captain of the Stanford Gymnastic Team 1986-87 and 1987–88 and voted Most Outstanding Gymnastic 1986-87 and Most Valuable Gymnastic 1987-88. He was NCAA All-American on the Rings in 1988 and a member of the 1987 Senior National Team. He qualified for the Olympic Trials in 1988.

== Honors ==
- Inducted into the Tennessee State Gymnastics Hall of Fame in 2007.
- Inducted into the Blount County Sports Hall of Fame 2008.
