= Pearson Springs Park =

Park in Tennessee, United States

Coordinates: 35°43′59″N 83°58′54″W

Pearson Springs Park is a public park managed by Maryville/Alcoa/Blount County Parks and Recreation. Pearson Springs parallels Pistol Creek from Best Road on the northeast to the junction of the Maryville Alcoa Greenway and Montgomery Lane on the southwest, all within the City of Maryville, Tennessee.

== Features ==
Pearsons Springs Park contains one mile of the Maryville Alcoa Greenway bordering Pistol Creek.

Facilities include a pavilion, three soccer practice fields, two baseball diamonds, restroom facilities and parking.

Between the baseball diamonds and the Greenway is a designated meadow habitat. An educational plaque provides information on meadow habitats.
