= Rockford, Tennessee =

Rockford
- City
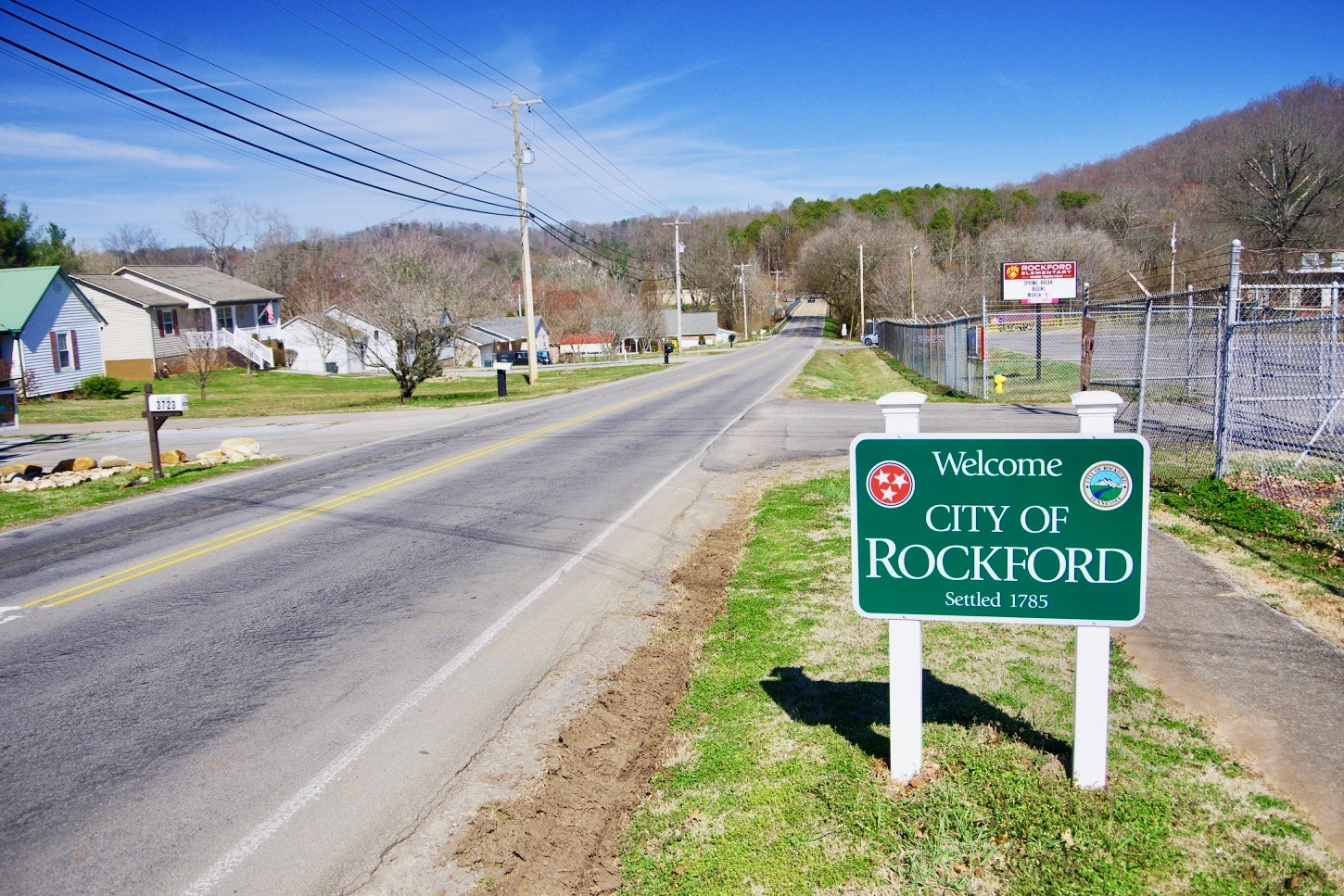
- Welcome sign along Williams Mill Road

- Seal

- Location of Rockford in Blount County, Tennessee.
- Coordinates: 35°49′58″N 83°56′09″W
- Country: United States
- State: Tennessee
- County: Blount
- Incorporated: 1970
- Named for: A ford over the Little River

Government
  - Type: City Council
  - Mayor: Carl Koella III
  - Vice Mayor: Kenneth Arwood

Area
  - Total: 3.20 sq mi (8.29 km^{2})
  - Land: 3.18 sq mi (8.24 km^{2})
  - Water: 0.019 sq mi (0.05 km^{2})
- Elevation: 925 ft (282 m)

Population (2020)
  - Total: 822
  - Density: 258/sq mi (99.7/km^{2})
- Time zone: UTC-5 (Eastern (EST))
  - Summer (DST): UTC-4 (EDT)
- ZIP code: 37853
- Area code: 865
- FIPS code: 47-64160
- GNIS feature ID: 2404636
- Website: https://www.rockfordtn.com/

Rockford is a city in Blount County, Tennessee. Its population was 822 at the 2020 census. It is included in the Knoxville, Tennessee Metropolitan Statistical Area.

== History ==
Rockford is named for a river ford used by early 19th-century settlers and merchants travelling between Knoxville and Maryville. As its name implies, the ford was unusually rocky, and thus preferred by travellers, as large amounts of silt and sand made much of the Little River difficult to cross. The community was called "Rocky Ford" by the early 1800s.

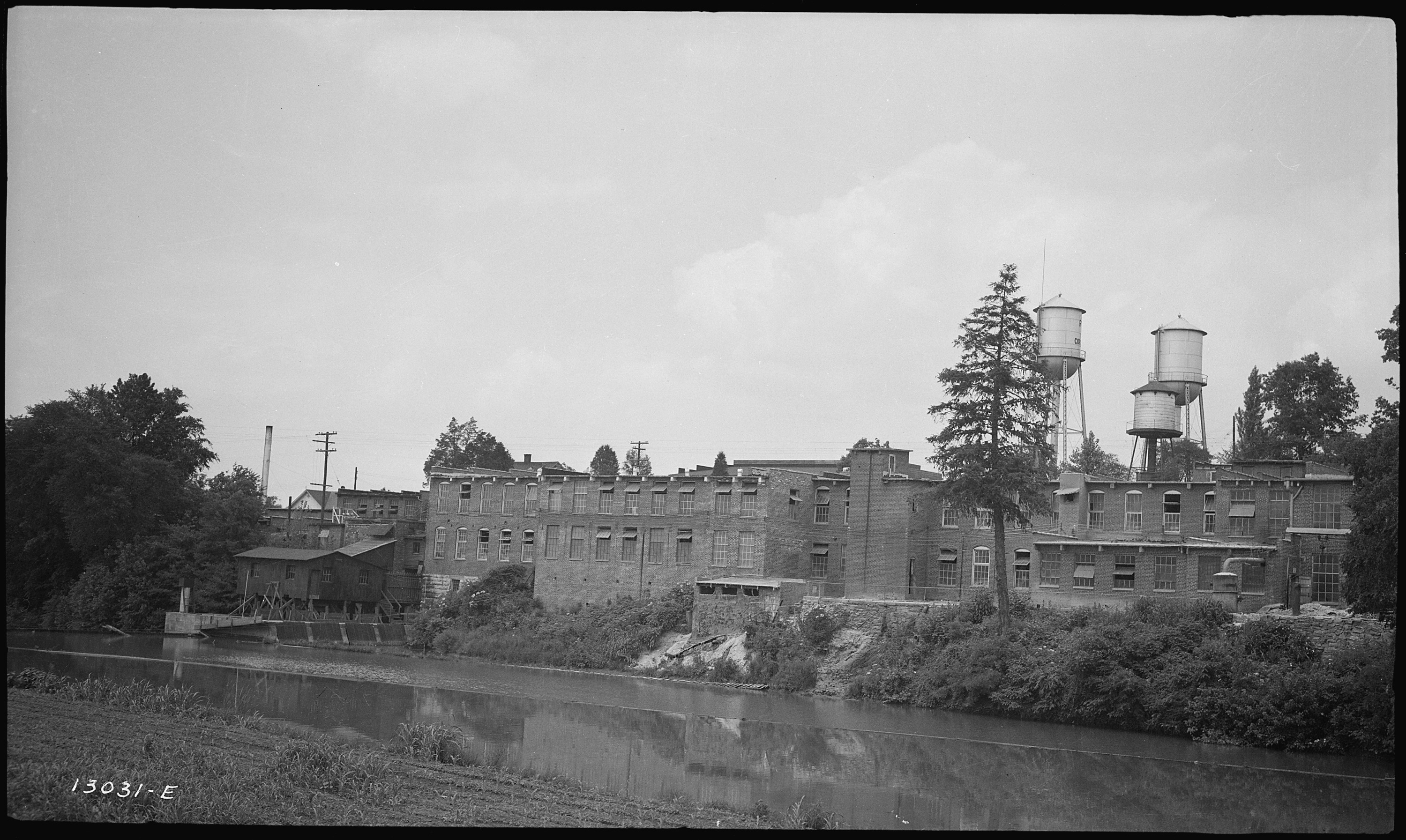
Rockford Manufacturing Company in 1942

Since the 1900s, the community has been the site of the Rockford Manufacturing Company, a yard cordage factory, and its adjacent and hazardous low head dam, formerly used to power the factory and now poses nothing more than a dangerous feature on the Little River, having been the site of numerous fatalities.

Rockford incorporated as a city in the early 1970s to avoid being annexed by Alcoa or Maryville, both of which were growing rapidly.

== Geography ==
Rockford is located in northern Blount County. The Little River, which rises in the Great Smoky Mountains and empties into the Tennessee River, passes through the city.

According to the United States Census Bureau, the city has a total area of 3.2 square miles (8.3 km^{2}), of which 0.023 square miles (0.06 km^{2}), or 0.69%, is water.

=== Climate ===
The climate in this area is characterized by relatively high temperatures and evenly distributed precipitation throughout the year. According to the Köppen Climate Classification system, Rockford has a Humid subtropical climate, abbreviated "Cfa" on climate maps.

Climate data for Rockford, Tennessee
Month	Jan	Feb	Mar	Apr	May	Jun	Jul	Aug	Sep	Oct	Nov	Dec	Year
Mean daily maximum °C (°F)	8 (47)	11 (51)	16 (60)	22 (71)	26 (79)	29 (85)	31 (88)	31 (88)	28 (82)	22 (72)	16 (60)	10 (50)	21 (69)
Mean daily minimum °C (°F)	−1 (30)	0 (32)	4 (40)	9 (49)	14 (57)	18 (64)	20 (68)	19 (67)	17 (62)	9 (49)	4 (40)	0 (32)	9 (49)
Average precipitation mm (inches)	120 (4.7)	110 (4.2)	130 (5)	97 (3.8)	100 (4)	100 (4)	110 (4.5)	86 (3.4)	79 (3.1)	71 (2.8)	97 (3.8)	110 (4.3)	1,200 (47.4)
Source: Weatherbase

== Demographics ==
Historical population
Census	Pop.	Note	%±
1880	144		—
1980	567		—
1990	646		13.9%
2000	798		23.5%
2010	856		7.3%
2020	822		−4.0%

=== 2020 census ===
As of the 2020 census, Rockford had a population of 822. The median age was 49.8 years. 15.9% of residents were under the age of 18 and 27.6% of residents were 65 years of age or older. For every 100 females there were 97.1 males, and for every 100 females age 18 and over there were 93.6 males age 18 and over.

49.9% of residents lived in urban areas, while 50.1% lived in rural areas.

There were 346 households in Rockford, of which 31.5% had children under the age of 18 living in them. Of all households, 50.3% were married-couple households, 19.9% were households with a male householder and no spouse or partner present, and 19.7% were households with a female householder and no spouse or partner present. About 20.2% of all households were made up of individuals and 8.4% had someone living alone who was 65 years of age or older.

There were 386 housing units, of which 10.4% were vacant. The homeowner vacancy rate was 1.9% and the rental vacancy rate was 15.5%.

Racial composition as of the 2020 census
Race	Number	Percent
White	757	92.1%
Black or African American	9	1.1%
American Indian and Alaska Native	0	0.0%
Asian	1	0.1%
Native Hawaiian and Other Pacific Islander	0	0.0%
Some other race	6	0.7%
Two or more races	49	6.0%
Hispanic or Latino (of any race)	29	3.5%

=== 2000 census ===
As of the census of 2000, there was a population of 798, with 317 households and 245 families residing in the city. The population density was 259.2 inhabitants per square mile (100.1/km^{2}). There were 362 housing units at an average density of 117.6 units per square mile (45.4 units/km^{2}). The racial makeup of the city was 96.74% White, 1.13% African American, 0.13% Native American, 0.38% Asian, and 1.63% from two or more races. Hispanic or Latino of any race were 0.75% of the population.

There were 317 households, out of which 32.2% had children under the age of 18 living with them, 63.1% were married couples living together, 11.0% had a female householder with no husband present, and 22.4% were non-families. 18.3% of all households were made up of individuals, and 6.9% had someone living alone who was 65 years of age or older. The average household size was 2.52 and the average family size was 2.84.

In the city, the population was spread out, with 22.8% under the age of 18, 7.6% from 18 to 24, 29.4% from 25 to 44, 26.8% from 45 to 64, and 13.3% who were 65 years of age or older. The median age was 40 years. For every 100 females, there were 93.2 males. For every 100 females age 18 and over, there were 91.3 males.

The median income for a household in the city was $43,816, and the median income for a family was $50,074. Males had a median income of $34,583 versus $26,250 for females. The per capita income for the city was $19,938. About 6.9% of families and 8.4% of the population were below the poverty line, including 10.9% of those under age 18 and 4.2% of those age 65 or over.

== Education ==
Rockford has one public school, Rockford Elementary School, a K-5 elementary school that is part of the Blount County Schools system. The school is located at 2738 Williams Mill Road.
