= William Bennett Scott Sr. =

American newspaper founder/publisher, mayor and civil rights activist

William Bennett Scott Sr. (died 1885) was a pioneering newspaper founder and publisher, mayor, and civil rights campaigner who helped found Freedman’s Normal Institute in Maryville, Tennessee. He was the first African American to run a newspaper in Tennessee and had the only newspaper in Blount County, Tennessee for 10 years. A Republican, he switched his and his paper's allegiance to the Democrats in the late 1870s.

As increased tensions followed Nat Turner's Rebellion, Scott left North Carolina and moved to Tennessee, settling in Friendsville, Tennessee and continuing his work in the harness and saddle making business. He moved to Knoxville as strife against free African Americans increased ahead of the American Civil War. After the war in 1865 he moved to Nashville and established the Colored Tennessean. The paper ran notices from people searching for family and loved ones separated by slavery.

Scott attended the 1865 Colored Convention in Nashville. He was described as being light skinned. A few years later, he moved to Maryville, Tennessee and published the Maryville Republican. His son, W. B. Scott Jr. was listed as an editor of the paper along with his father. Scott Jr. reportedly had the paper endorse General Bate (William B. Bate) in 1882 when Bate was running for governor. He was elected Mayor of Maryville in 1869. He was inducted into the Tennessee Newspaper Hall of Fame and a historical marker commemorates his life.

Scott died in 1885 and was buried in the old New Providence Church Cemetery. His headstone reads: "Respected Black Journalist / Businessman and Mayor of Maryville / Placed in honor of his faithful service to his community". A historical marker commemorates his life and his portrait is displayed in the Maryville Municipal Building.

Some of Scott's descendants traveled to Maryville in 2013 for the unveiling of a portrait of Scott that will be displayed in Maryville's Municipal Building. Shirley Carr Clowney wrote about Scott in her history book covering the history of African Americans in Blount County.

== See also ==
- List of first African-American mayors
