= Maryville High School (Tennessee) =

Public high school in Maryville, Tennessee, United States

Location
- 825 Lawrence Avenue; Maryville, Blount County, Tennessee; United States; 35.7486°N 83.9775°W

Information
- Type: Public
- Established: 1918; 108 years ago
- School district: Maryville City Schools
- Principal: Heather Hilton
- Teaching staff: 71.67 (FTE)
- Enrollment: 1,257 (2023-2024)
- Student to teacher ratio: 17.54
- Colors: Red and black
- Team name: Rebels
- Rival: Alcoa High School
- Website: https://mhs.maryville-schools.org/

Maryville High School (MHS) is a three-year public high school with grades 10–12. It was founded in 1918 in Maryville, Tennessee and is a part of the Maryville City Schools system.

In the 2009–2010 year, there were approximately 1,558 students enrolled, and the senior class consisted of 352 students. With 107 faculty members, the staff-to-student ratio was approximately 1:15. The school principal is Heather Hilton.

Maryville High School has been designated by the Governor of Tennessee as an A+ school. Five National Merit Finalists graduated from Maryville in 2003.

== Athletics ==
The school's athletic teams go by the name Red Rebels. Maryville High School had the longest active football winning streak in America (74–0) until their loss in the 2008 Tennessee 4A State Championship Game. Maryville's primary rival is Alcoa, against whom the Red Rebels hold a 60–23–3 series advantage in football through the 2014 season. This was reportedly the longest in Tennessee history, breaking the record of Cleveland High School.

The Rebels captured their 14th TSSAA State Football Title against the Hendersonville Commandos in 2013, rounding-out an undefeated 2013 season. MHS has appeared in the Class 6A Football Championship game every year from when class 6A was formed in 2009 through 2015 and then again in 2017 and 2019, with every year except 2009 and 2012 resulting in a championship. MHS has appeared in the State Championship games every year from 2003 through 2015, not all resulting in wins. The Rebels captured their 15th TSSAA State Football Title against the Ravenwood Raptors in 2014 coming back from a 28-point deficit in the first quarter. Maryville won their 15th title in overtime after TD Blackmon made an interception on a 2-point conversion to seal the win. Blackmon also was responsible for blocking a crucial field goal at the end of regulation to prevent the Raptors from scoring a field goal and sending the game into overtime, the final score was 35–34.

The 2013 State Championship was MHS's 3rd Division 1, Class 6A Title, following their first two in 2010 and 2011. The three 6A Titles stand in addition to seven other 4A Titles held by Coach George Quarles and the Red Rebels in the 2000s, prior to their 6A classification. The Red Rebels reached an overall National ranking of 7th, and 1st in the State of Tennessee, in 2011. MHS also reached the 1st-place position as overall cumulative State of Tennessee Football Championship Title-holder in 2011, Alcoa holds 7 more championships over MHS. MHS last state championship was December 7, 2019.

During the 2007 season, the basketball team won the state championship in class AAA.

In 2017, the Rebel's baseball team went on a historic run. Although missing the State Tournament by one game, the Rebels set the school record for wins (30) and won the District 4-AAA baseball tournament for the first time since 2011. With 2 wins over top-seeded Farragut on their own home field, the Rebels capped off a season that saw them have win streaks of 8 games in a row and 12 games in a row, while going 24–3 in their last 27 games. The Rebels hosted the Region Championship on May 17, losing a heart breaker to Farragut, 1–0. That loss caused them to have to travel to Kingsport to face the Dobyns Bennett Indians on May 19, the same day and the same time as graduation. Unfortunately, the scheduling conflict prevented the senior baseball players to walk across the stage with their peers, and the Rebels lost a tough game 5-0 putting them out of the post season.

== Controversy ==
Since 1938, Maryville High School teams have used the name Red Rebels. From the 1960s onward the team name has been linked in promotional materials with the rebellion during the Civil War, such links including the use of the Confederate battle flag, images of a Confederate soldier, and references to the rebel yell. In 1999, Dr. Jeffrey Whitlow, a local doctor, filed a civil rights complaint against the school board, equating the football games with Ku Klux Klan rallies. The school board promptly changed the school's flag, but fans, almost exclusively students, continued displaying, wearing, and bringing the controversial symbol to support the rarely defeated football team.

Supporters of the school board defended their position by stating that the flags (most of which were fastened on poles used to make more celebratory noise by banging on bleachers) were a security issue that could cause serious injury. Opponents argue that the ban is obviously one on the symbol itself, a symbol which, in their minds, no longer represents racism, but is merely an emblem of their beloved school.

Despite administrators' attempts, the student body still managed to bring the Rebel flag into their stadium and others on their clothes, tied around their waists, or even painted on their bodies. When assistant principals attempted to suspend students for wearing the flag, a $20 million lawsuit was pressed against the school for denying the right of free speech. In response, students created facebook groups with names like, "Don't like the rebel flag? Well, don't fly it and shut the hell up!" where they argue that the flag is not a symbol of racism by claiming that the Civil War was not fought over slavery, but over states' rights.

Controversy surrounding the issue received national attention. The former president of a North Carolina National Association for the Advancement of Colored People chapter agreed with the Sons of Confederate Veterans's opposition of the ban, saying that the flag should no longer be considered a symbol of racism. Black southern heritage activist H. K. Edgerton organized a walk from Johnson City to Maryville to protest the decision, and he subsequently attended every football game of the season dressed in a Confederate uniform and carrying a Confederate flag.

In 2008, the Sixth Circuit Court of Appeals affirmed the dismissal of the lawsuit over the ban of student display of the Confederate flag, citing a threat of "disturbances such as those experienced in the past" as justification of the ban.

== Notable alumni ==
- Lamar Alexander, former Governor of Tennessee, former Secretary of Education, U.S. Senator
- Glenn Reynolds, Law Professor and author of the political blog Instapundit
- Roy Kramer, former SEC commissioner (1990–2002)
- James A. Lindsay, mathematician
- Knox Ramsey, NFL player
- Danny Spradlin, American football player
- Carl Stewart (American football), former Auburn University fullback (2003–2008)
- Lee Humphrey, NCAA Basketball National "3-point" Record holder and member of repeat NCAA National Championship Florida Gators (2003–2007)
- Aaron Grant, American football player
- Mike Matzek, All American Gymnast
- Nathan Nicholson, lead singer and founding member of the English band The Boxer Rebellion.
- Shane Claiborne, Christian activist and a leading figure in the New Monasticism
- DJ Burks, American football player
- William H. Lane, former chairman of The Masters

== Other sources ==
- "Stoner, A. Derrick. "The Daily Times: What I Think."". Archived from the original on September 8, 2002.
- "Neal, R. "Old Times Here are Not Forgotten."". Archived from the original on February 9, 2006.
- McLamb, Stephen. "Diversity Council Formed After High School Incident."
- Barker, Scott, et al. "Rebel Flag Fuss."
- Anderson, Josh. "No. 10 Maryville wins 60th straight game, Tennessee state title."
