= Maryville, Tennessee =

Maryville
- City
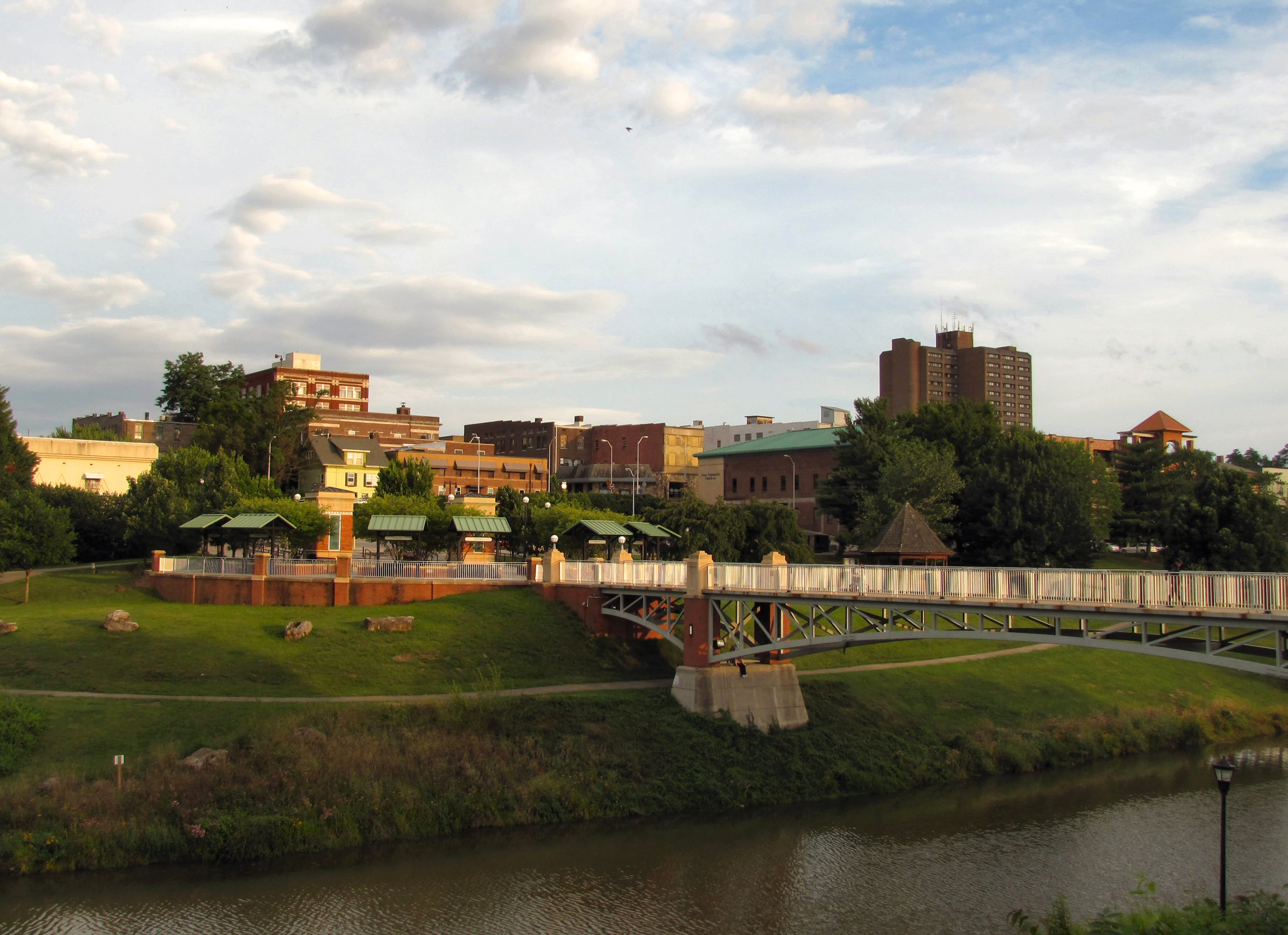
- Skyline with Greenbelt Park below

- Flag Logo
- Motto: "People are the Key"
- Location of Maryville in Blount County, Tennessee.

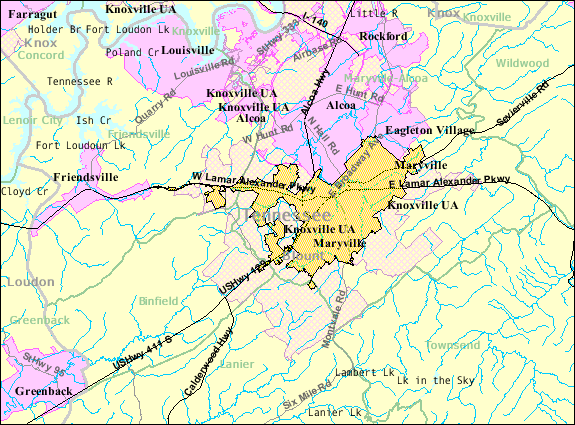
- U.S. Census map
- Coordinates: 35°44′48″N 83°58′44″W
- Country: United States
- State: Tennessee
- County: Blount
- Settled: 1785
- Incorporated: 1795
- Named for: Mary Grainger Blount

Government
  - Type: Council-manager
  - City manager: Greg McClain
  - Mayor: Andy White

Area
  - Total: 17.27 sq mi (44.72 km^{2})
  - Land: 17.27 sq mi (44.72 km^{2})
  - Water: 0 sq mi (0.00 km^{2})
- Elevation: 981 ft (299 m)

Population (2020)
  - Total: 31,907
  - Density: 1,847.9/sq mi (713.48/km^{2})
- Time zone: UTC-5 (Eastern (EST))
  - Summer (DST): UTC-4 (EDT)
- ZIP codes: 37801-37804
- Area code: 865
- FIPS code: 47-46380
- GNIS feature ID: 2405036
- Website: www.maryvillegov.com

Maryville is a city in and the county seat of Blount County, Tennessee, United States. Its population was 31,907 at the 2020 census.

== History ==
The Great Indian Warpath (which was used to build the route US-411) was long used by the indigenous peoples of the area. A Cherokee village known as "Elajay" was situated at the confluence of Ellejoy Creek (named after the village) and the Little River. Its site was near the modern Heritage High School. Ensign Henry Timberlake passed through the village in 1762 while returning from his expedition to the Overhill villages to the west. He reported that it had been abandoned.

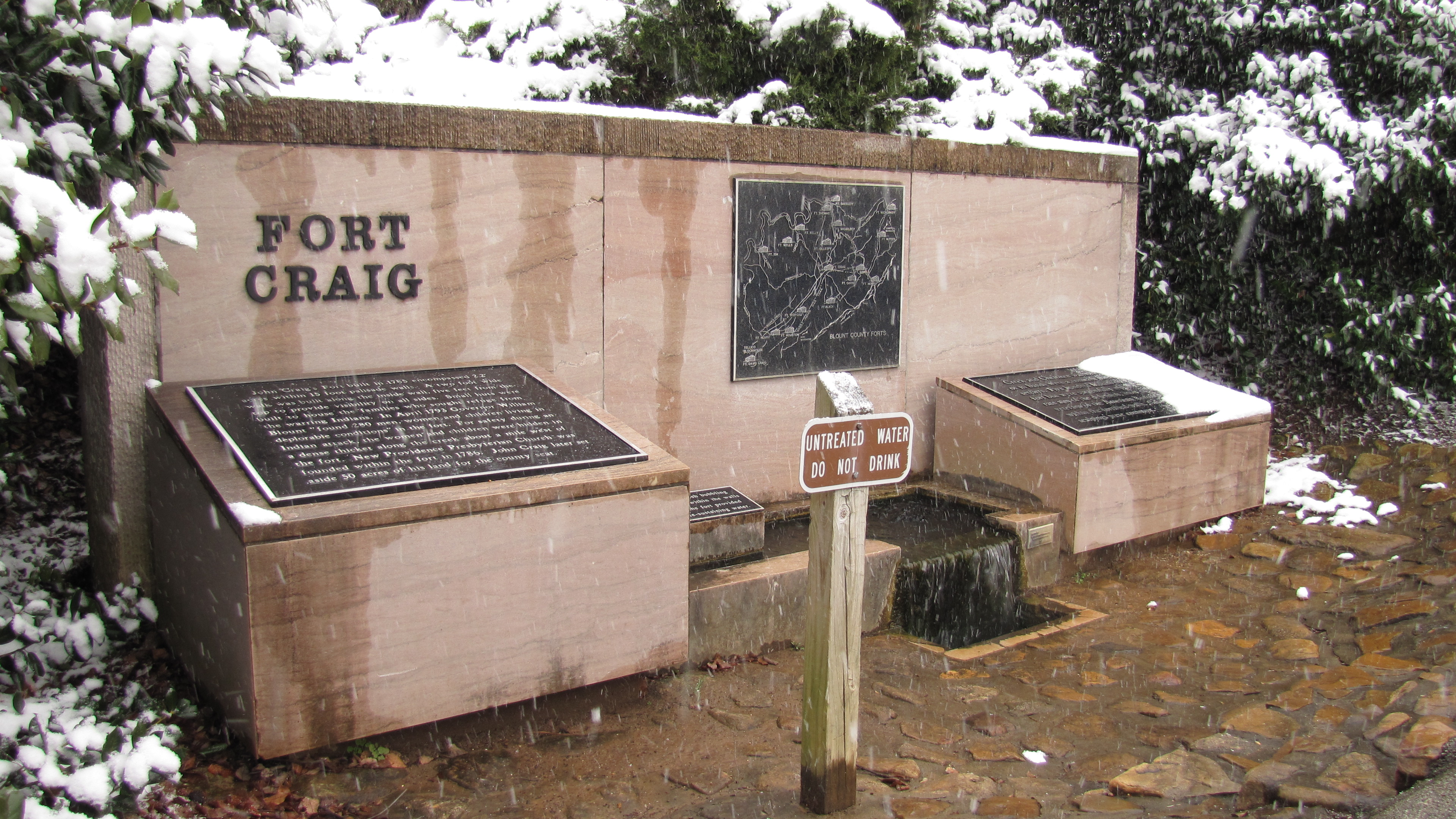
Monument marking the spring that once supplied water to Fort Craig

In 1785, Revolutionary War veteran John Craig built a wooden palisade enclosing cabins at what is known as Fort Craig (or Craig's Station) in present-day Maryville. Such stations were built throughout the frontier to defend settlers against attacks from the Cherokee. For example, "on April 11, 1793, when settlers believed Indian attacks were imminent, 280 men, women, and children gathered in small huts at John Craig's station on Nine Mile Creek."

Craig donated 50 acres (20 ha) next to his fort for the founding of a new town. Incorporated as a city on July 11, 1795, the settlement was named in honor of Mary Grainger Blount, wife of the territorial governor William Blount. Blount County was named after him.

The family of Sam Houston moved to Maryville from Virginia in 1808, when Houston was 15. His older brothers put him to work as a clerk in a store they established in town, but he ran away. Houston lived for a few years with the Cherokee at Hiwassee Island, on the Hiwassee River, where he became fluent in their language and appreciative of their culture. After his return to Maryville about 1811, Houston started a one-room schoolhouse. He signed up for the army during the War of 1812 and rose rapidly in rank, beginning his military and political career. The schoolhouse still stands just off US-411 near the community of Wildwood.

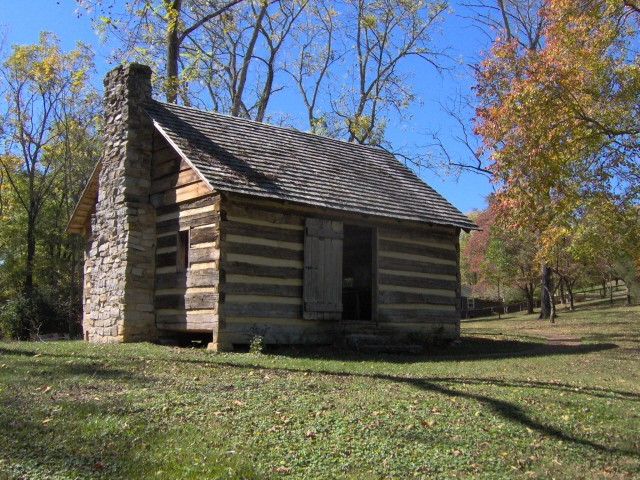
Sam Houston Schoolhouse in Maryville

Maryville was a center of abolitionist activity throughout the early 19th-century; it was generated mostly by the Society of Friends, which had a relatively large presence in Blount County. They were supported by anti-slavery advocates such as Isaac L. Anderson, the founder of Maryville College. When Tennessee voted on the Ordinance of Secession in 1861, only 19 percent of Blount Countians voted in favor of seceding from the Union.

Although staunchly pro-Union throughout the Civil War, Maryville was not liberated by federal troops until May 1864. In August of that year, a Confederate cavalry raid, under the command of General Joseph Wheeler, attacked the courthouse where the Union troops had taken shelter. To try to dislodge the federal soldiers, Confederates set fire to several buildings, including a store where the city's records were being kept. Polly Tool, an African-American slave, rescued most of the records. She was honored by a statue in the Blount County courthouse. In the Reconstruction Era Maryville became a hub of Radical Republican activity for East Tennessee. Its local Union League provided a lively forum for political discussion, and the Freedmen's Normal Institute was established on the present-day site of Maryville High School. The city elected William Bennett Scott Sr., the country's second African-American mayor, in 1869.

Maryville is home to one of 24 Alcoa Care-free Homes built in the United States in 1957–1958.

In the 1970s, after several department stores and other retailers moved from the downtown area to Alcoa's Midland shopping center, the city spent $10 million on a renewal project called "Now Town". Traffic was re-routed, facades were placed on old buildings, slums were cleared, and the Bicentennial Greenbelt Park was created. The project failed to attract business back to the downtown locations; instead retailers moved to the new Foothills Mall a few years later. The downtown area remained in decline until the 2000s, when the city agreed to reverse many of the "Now Town" changes.

U.S. Senator Lamar Alexander was born in Maryville in 1940. Alexander served as Governor of Tennessee from 1979 to 1987 and Secretary of Education (1991–1993) under President George H. W. Bush. He ran unsuccessful campaigns for president in 1996 and 2000, both times announcing his candidacy for the Republican Party from his hometown of Maryville. In 2002, he was elected to the U.S. Senate, succeeding Fred Thompson.

On July 2, 2015, a CSX freight train carrying hazardous materials went off of its tracks. Over 5,000 citizens were displaced from their homes within a two-mile (three kilometer) radius.

== Geography ==
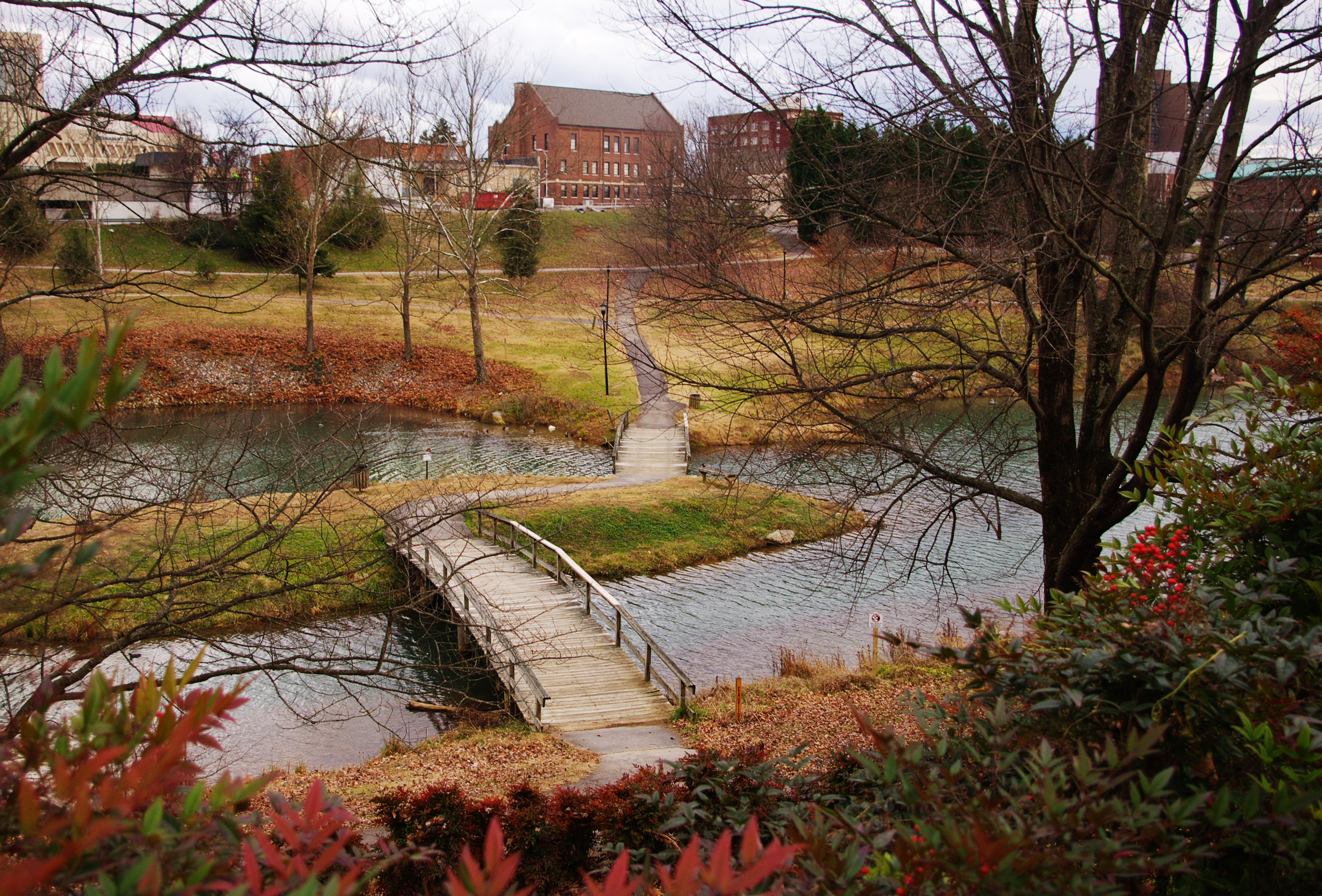
Bicentennial Greenbelt Park

Maryville is located in north-central Blount County in the foothills of the Great Smoky Mountains. Chilhowee Mountain, the outermost ridge of the Western Smokies, rises prominently to the south. Chilhowee's eastern flank— known locally as "The Three Sisters"— is visible from almost anywhere in the city, and dominates the southern horizon along US-321 between Maryville and Walland. Maryville is bordered on the north by Maryville's twin city, Alcoa. A number of small suburbs— including Wildwood, Ellejoy, and Clover Hill— surround Maryville to the east and west.

According to the United States Census Bureau, the city has a total area of 16.8 square miles (43.5 km^{2}), all land.

=== Major streets ===
- Broadway, the main street of the downtown area, is partly an alignment of U.S. Route 411 and U.S. Route 129. It continues to Knoxville to the north and Monroe County to the southwest.
- Lamar Alexander Parkway, an alignment of U.S. Route 321, continues to Lenoir City to the west and Townsend and the Great Smoky Mountains National Park to the east.
- Maryville-Alcoa Bypass, an alignment of U.S. Route 129 and part of the primary route between Maryville and Knoxville
- Montvale Road (State Route 336)
- Morganton Road, which runs parallel to US 411, connects Maryville to Greenback and the old Morganton area to west.
- Cusick Street crosses Broadway at the center of the downtown area. It extends north through Alcoa toward Louisville.
- Washington Street, an alignment of State Route 35, defines the eastern limit of the downtown area and extends through Alcoa as Hall Road.

=== Parks ===
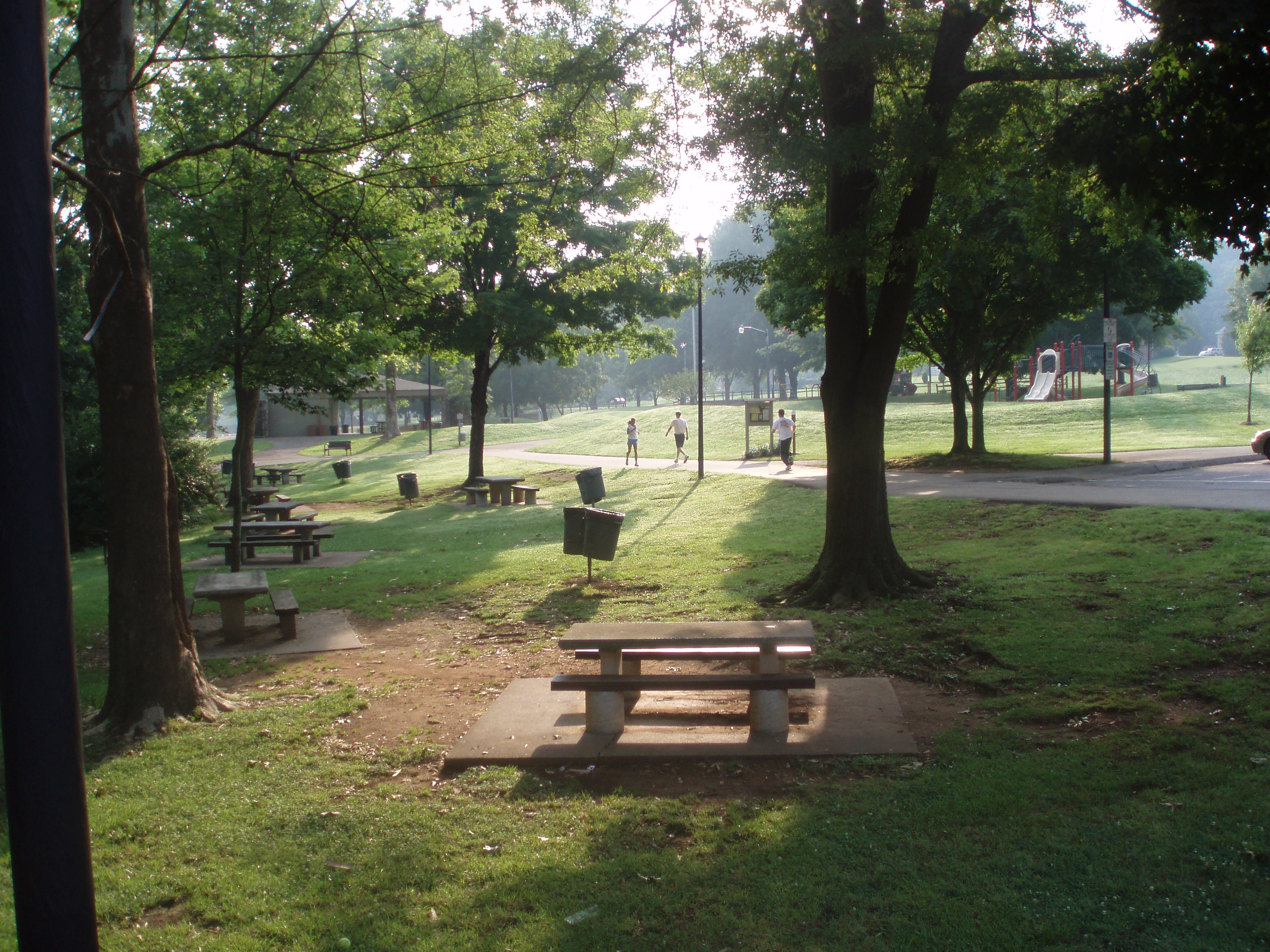
Sandy Springs Park

- Maryville Alcoa Greenway
- Bicentennial Greenbelt Park
- Amerine Park
- Everett Park
- John Sevier Park
- Pearson Springs Park
- Sandy Springs Park
- Jarvis Park

=== Climate ===
Average temperatures in July range from 69 degrees low to 87 degrees high. Average temperatures in January range from 29 degrees low to 46 degrees high. Most of the year is very pleasant with mild temperatures.

== Demographics ==
Historical population
Census	Pop.	Note	%±
1850	513		—
1860	493		−3.9%
1870	811		64.5%
1880	1,098		35.4%
1890	1,686		53.6%
1910	2,381		—
1920	3,739		57.0%
1930	4,958		32.6%
1940	5,609		13.1%
1950	7,742		38.0%
1960	10,348		33.7%
1970	13,808		33.4%
1980	17,480		26.6%
1990	19,208		9.9%
2000	23,120		20.4%
2010	27,465		18.8%
2020	31,907		16.2%
2025 (est.)	32,442	▲	1.7%

=== 2020 census ===
As of the 2020 census, Maryville had a population of 31,907, 12,212 households, and 7,132 families. The median age was 39.1 years, with 23.3% of residents under the age of 18 and 19.0% of residents 65 years of age or older. For every 100 females there were 91.5 males, and for every 100 females age 18 and over there were 87.1 males age 18 and over.

As of the 2020 census, 100.0% of residents lived in urban areas, while 0.0% lived in rural areas.

Of the 12,212 households, 33.1% had children under the age of 18 living in them, 49.9% were married-couple households, 15.1% were households with a male householder and no spouse or partner present, and 30.0% were households with a female householder and no spouse or partner present. About 29.4% of all households were made up of individuals and 15.0% had someone living alone who was 65 years of age or older.

There were 12,962 housing units, of which 5.8% were vacant. The homeowner vacancy rate was 1.6% and the rental vacancy rate was 5.4%.

Racial composition as of the 2020 census
Race	Number	Percent
White	27,490	86.2%
Black or African American	968	3.0%
American Indian and Alaska Native	119	0.4%
Asian	642	2.0%
Native Hawaiian and Other Pacific Islander	5	0.0%
Some other race	745	2.3%
Two or more races	1,938	6.1%
Hispanic or Latino (of any race)	1,639	5.1%

=== 2010 census ===
As of the census of 2010, there were 27,465 people, 10,712 households, and 7,028 families. The population density was 1,634.8 inhabitants per square mile (631.2/km^{2}). There were 11,679 housing units at an average density of 637.6 per square mile (246.2/km^{2}). The racial makeup of the city was 92.0% White, 3.2% Black, 0.3% Native American, 1.55% Asian, 0.03% Pacific Islander, 0.53% from other races, and 1.8% from two or more races. Hispanic or Latino of any race were 3.2% of the population.

There were 10,712 households, out of which 32.0% had children under the age of 18 living with them, 48.6% were married couples living together, 12.8% had a female householder with no husband present, and 34.4% were non-families. 30.4% of all households were made up of individuals, and 29.7% had someone living alone who was 65 years of age or older. The average household size was 2.41 and the average family size was 3.00.

In the city, the population was spread out, with 24.2% under the age of 18, 6.8% from 20 to 24, 24.2% from 25 to 44, 24.4% from 45 to 64, and 17.1% who were 65 years of age or older. The median age was 39.1 years. For every 100 females, there were 88.0 males.

The median income for a household in the city was $46,394, and the median income for a family was $61,227. Males had a median income of $31,478 versus $20,418 for females. The per capita income for the city was $23,579. About 9.0% of families and 10.2% of the population were below the poverty line, including 12.3% of those under age 18 and 3.1% of those age 65 or over.

== Economy ==
=== Top employers ===
According to Maryville's 2020 Comprehensive Annual Financial Report, the top employers in the area were:

#	Employer	# of Employees
1	Denso	5,350
2	Clayton Homes	4,883
3	Blount Memorial Hospital	2,647
4	McGhee Tyson Air National Guard Base	1,728
5	Blount County Schools	1,701
6	Amazon	1,100
7	Newell Brands	1,000
8	Arconic (formerly Alcoa, Inc.)	898
9	Blount County Government	774
10	Maryville City Schools	708
11	Walmart	610
12	Accenture Hospitality Service	541
13	TeamHealth Alcoa Billing Center	451
14	Ruby Tuesday	475
15	Massey Group	405
16	Maryville College	380
17	Reinhart Food Service (formerly IJ Co.)	344
18	City of Maryville	321
19	Standard Aero Inc.	335
20	Rockford Manufacturing	300
21	City of Alcoa	275
22	K12	265
23	Alcoa City Schools	344
24	Peninsula Hospital, Division of Covenant Health	317

== Education ==
=== City ===
Maryville City Schools operates public schools.

- Coulter Grove Intermediate School
- Foothills Elementary School
- John Sevier Elementary School
- Maryville High School
- Montgomery Ridge Intermediate School
- Maryville Junior High School (formerly Maryville Middle School)
- Sam Houston Elementary School

=== Private or parochial ===
- Maryville Christian School
- Apostolic Christian Academy
- Clayton Bradley Academy

=== Maryville College ===
Maryville is home to Maryville College, a private four-year liberal arts college. It was founded in 1819 by Presbyterian minister Isaac L. Anderson for the purpose of furthering education and enlightenment and whose mission was to do good on the largest possible scale. The college is one of the fifty oldest colleges in the United States and the twelfth oldest institution in the South. It is associated with the Presbyterian Church (USA). It enrolls about 1,103 students. Maryville College's mascot is the Scots. The sports teams compete in NCAA Division III athletics in the USA South Athletic Conference and formerly the Great South Athletic Conference.

=== Other colleges ===
- Satellite campus of Pellissippi State Community College

=== Weekend programs ===
The East Tennessee Japanese School (イーストテネシー補習授業校 Īsuto Teneshī Hoshū Jugyō Kō), a weekend Japanese education program, holds its classes at Maryville College.

== Notable people ==
- Charles McCallon Alexander, nineteenth century gospel singer
- Lamar Alexander, former U.S. senator from Tennessee; former Governor of Tennessee, Secretary of Education and Republican presidential candidate
- Isaac L. Anderson, founder of Maryville College
- Candace Barley, youngest player to compete on the US national rugby team and play in international match, and holds the title of most-capped U20 player in the country.
- Albert Brigance, author and special education resource specialist
- Charles W. Cansler, educator and civil rights advocate
- Shane Claiborne
- Randall Cobb, NFL football player (born in Maryville, but played high school football at Alcoa)
- Mike Cross, musician
- Edwin Cunningham, US Consul General in Shanghai (1920-1935)
- Mark Doty, poet and memoirist
- David L. Eubanks, Christian preacher and president of Johnson Bible College
- Phillip Fulmer, former Tennessee Volunteers football coach (1992–2008)
- Guy Garman, scuba diver
- Jack Greene, country music singer, famous for his #1 hit "There Goes My Everything".
- George Washington Harris, humorist; lived near what is now Wildwood, c. 1839–1843
- Sam Houston, Texas revolutionary, politician and governor of Tennessee and Texas; lived in Maryville intermittently c. 1808—1813
- Lee Humphrey, college basketball player
- Melanie Hutsell, television and movie actress
- Roy Kramer, former commissioner of the Southeastern Conference
- Annie Law (died 1889), conchologist
- Jackie Lee, country music singer
- Mike Matzek, All-American gymnast
- Wayne McClure, American football player
- Charles B. Moore, American physicist, engineer and meteorologist
- William Bennett Scott Sr.
- Doc Severinsen, trumpeter
- Danny Spradlin, American football player

== See also ==
- Alcoa, Tennessee
- Clover Hill Mill
