= Happy Valley, Blount County, Tennessee =

Happy Valley
- Unincorporated community
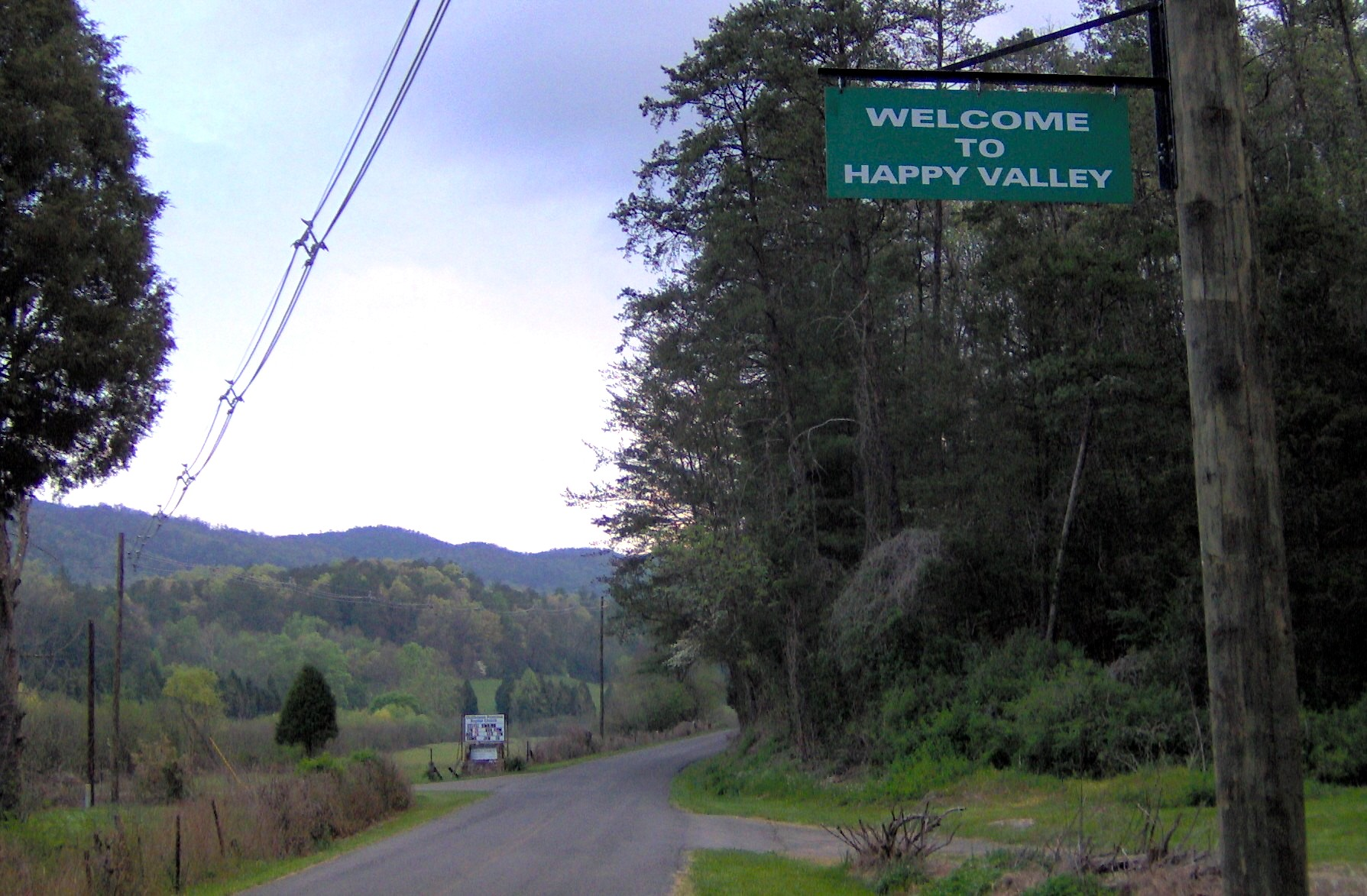
- Happy Valley

- Location within the state of Tennessee Happy Valley (the United States)
- Coordinates: 35°36′32″N 83°57′27″W
- Country: United States
- State: Tennessee
- County: Blount

Population (2000)
  - Total: 529
- Time zone: UTC-5 (Eastern (EST))
  - Summer (DST): UTC-4 (EDT)

Happy Valley is an unincorporated community in Blount County, Tennessee, near the Great Smoky Mountains National Park. Although it is not a census-designated place, the ZIP Code Tabulation Area for the ZIP Code (37878) that serves Happy Valley had a population of 529 as of the 2000 U.S. Census.

== Geography ==
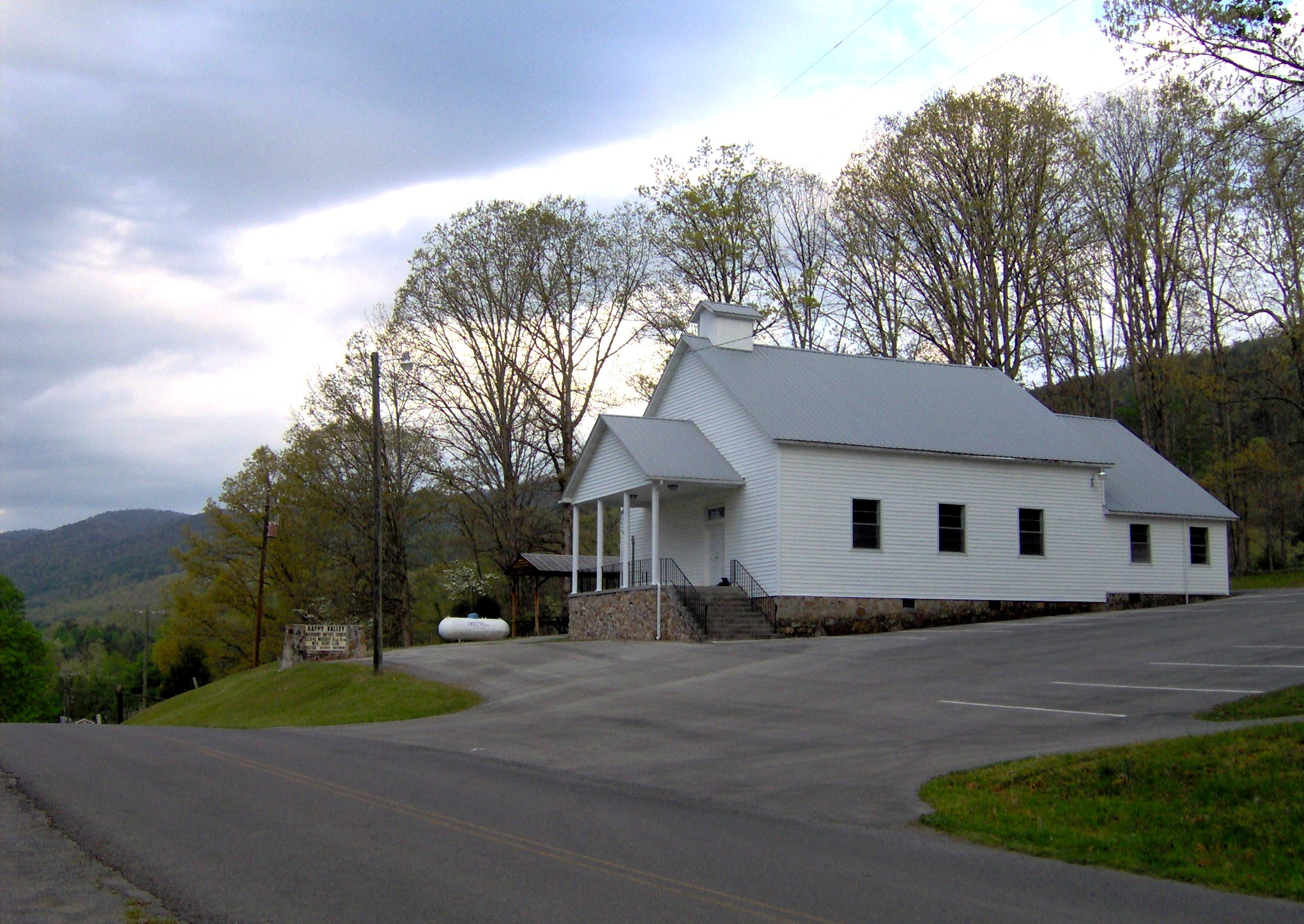
Happy Valley Missionary Baptist Church

Happy Valley is situated in a narrow valley of the same name on the northwestern fringe of the Great Smoky Mountains. Chilhowee Mountain— an elongate ridge stretching for roughly 35 miles (56 km) between the Little Tennessee River and the Little Pigeon River watersheds— spans Happy Valley to the north. The valley is walled off to the south by several low ridges— namely Pine Mountain to the southwest and Hatcher Mountain to the southeast— which run roughly parallel to Chilhowee Mountain. Cades Cove is located opposite Hatcher and Pine Mountain to the south. Happy Valley Ridge provides the valley's eastern barrier, splitting it off from Lake in the Sky and the Top of The World community. Gregory Bald and the main crest of the western Smokies rises beyond Pine Mountain approximately 3 miles (4.8 km) to the southwest.

Abrams Creek, which rises in Cades Cove, flows northwestward through the gap between Pine Mountain and Hatcher Mountain. Before it reaches Happy Valley, the creek turns southwestward and flows for several more miles before emptying into the Chilhowee Lake impoundment of the Little Tennessee River. Happy Valley's two major streams— Mill Creek and Bell Branch— are tributaries of Abrams Creek. Happy Valley Road, which connects U.S. Route 129 with the Look Rock section of Foothills Parkway, is the only major road access for Happy Valley. The road is accessible immediately southeast of the parkway's terminus along US-129.

== History ==
=== Early history ===
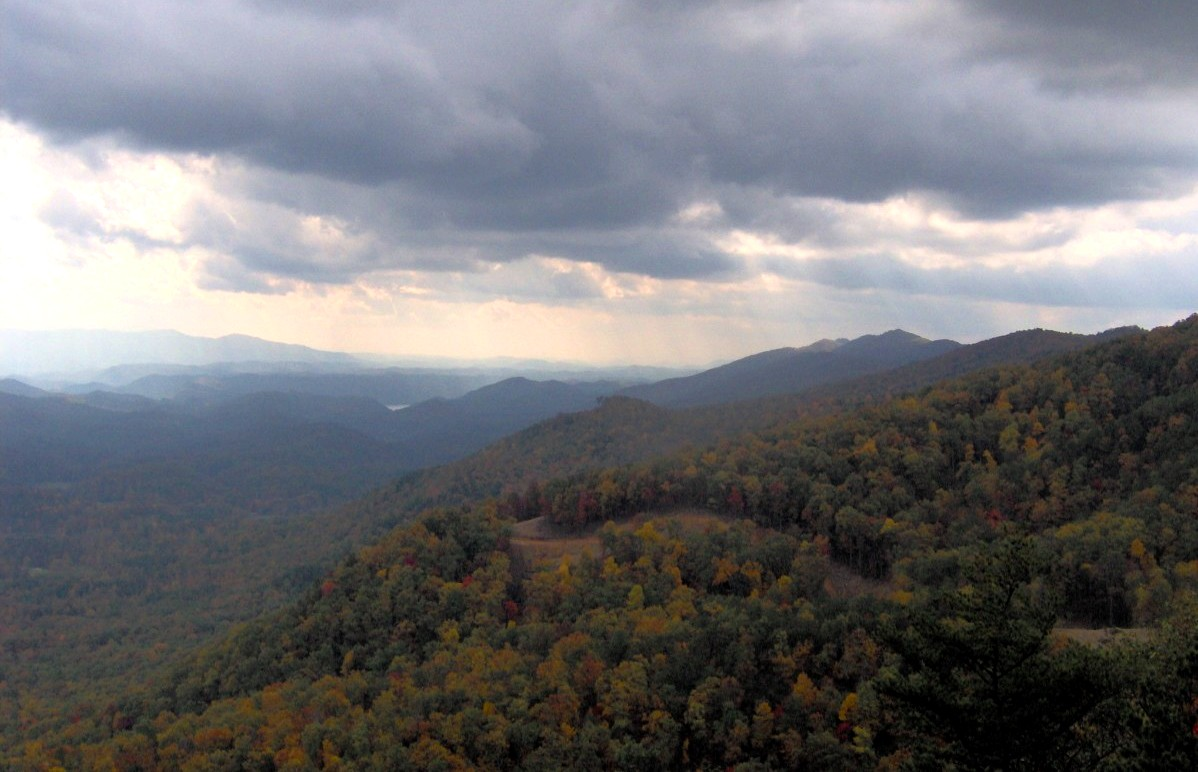
Happy Valley (left) and the crest of Chilhowee Mountain (right), viewed from Foothills Parkway

An expedition led by Spanish explorer Juan Pardo is believed to have passed through Happy Valley in October 1567. Pardo was attempting to reach the village of Coosa in northern Georgia via the Tennessee Valley. He left Chiaha (on Zimmerman's Island, now submerged by Douglas Lake) on October 13, marching southwest across the Foothills of the Great Smokies. He crossed Little River at what is now Walland, and camped at what is now Lake in the Sky. From there, he proceeded across Happy Valley en route to the village of Chalahume at the mouth of Abrams Creek.

In the 18th century, Happy Valley was likely part of a Cherokee trail system connecting the Overhill towns along the Little Tennessee to the Tuckaleechee Villages in modern Townsend and tribal hunting grounds in Cades Cove. The Overhill town of Chilhowee was situated opposite the mouth of Abrams Creek, and likely succeeded the village of Chalahume reported by Pardo. Abrams Creek was named after Old Abraham of Chilhowee, a prominent Overhill chief in the 1780s.

=== Settlement ===
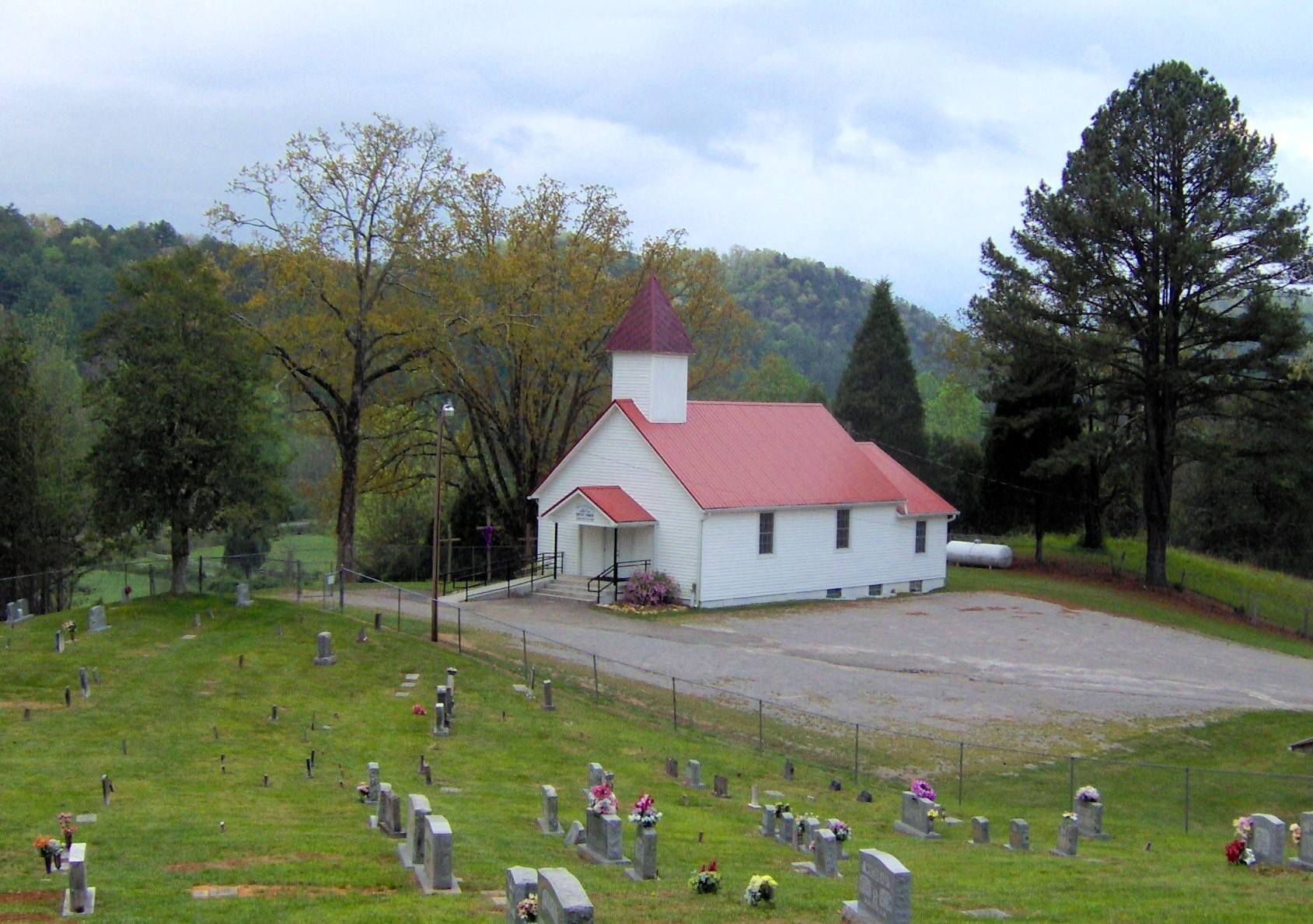
Chilhowee Primitive Baptist Church, nicknamed "Red Top"

Happy Valley's first permanent Euro-American settler, Robert Rhea, arrived in the valley sometime around 1823. Rhea was a veteran of the American Revolution and the War of 1812, and sought the land as an ideal place to spend his waning years. For nearly 40 years after Rhea's arrival, Happy Valley was known as Rhea's Valley.

In the 1830s, Cades Cove entrepreneur Daniel Davis Foute financed the construction of a road connecting his iron forge in Cades Cove with his resort hotel at Montvale Springs. Known as the Cooper Road after its builder, Joe Cooper, the road followed Abrams Creek from Cades Cove into Happy Valley, crossed Chilhowee Mountain at Murray Gap (near Look Rock), and descended to Montvale Springs. Throughout the 19th century and early 20th century, Cades Cove residents used this road to drive cattle back and forth between markets in Maryville and the grassy balds atop the western Smokies.

In the years following the American Civil War (1861–1865), a large number of settlers migrated from Carter County, Tennessee to Happy Valley. The valley— which had been known as Rhea Valley— obtained the name "Happy Valley" around this time. The name might have been inspired by Happy Valley in Carter County, which was the original home of many of the post-Civil War migrants.

=== The national park and preservation ===
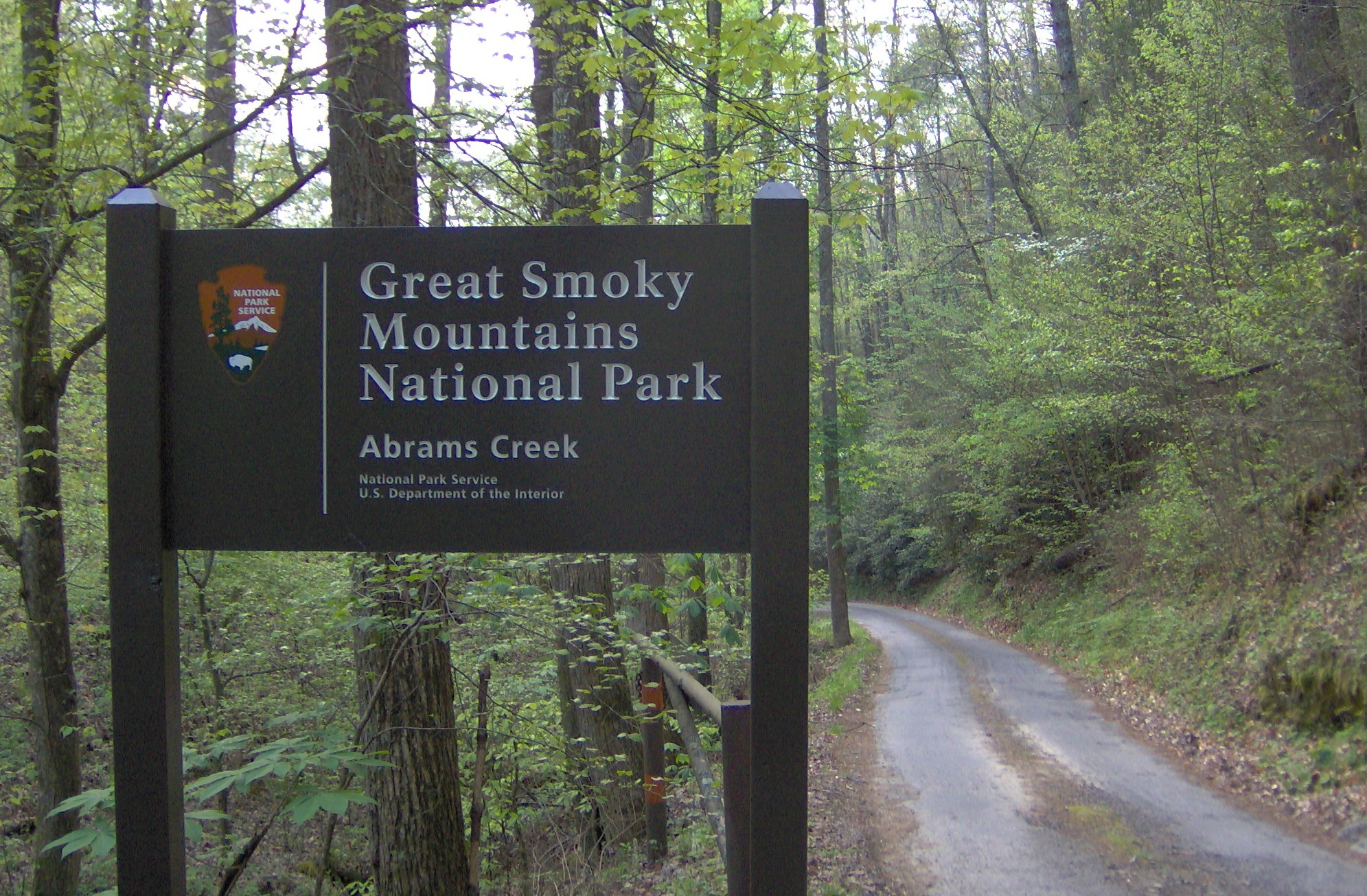
The Abrams Creek entrance to the Great Smoky Mountains National Park

In 1926, conservation groups began buying up land for the creation of the Great Smoky Mountains National Park, which opened in 1934. The park boundary parallels the valley to the south, and includes all of Abrams Creek. A campground and ranger station are now situated at the confluence of Kingfisher Creek and Abrams Creek. Several of the old roads, including the Cooper Road to Cades Cove, the Cane Creek Road to Walland, and the cattle drovers' paths to Gregory Bald, were converted into hiking trails.

In 2006, a group of conservationists known as "Save Chilhowee Mountain" attempted unsuccessfully to block an 80-home development project initiated by Harmony Property Group. Save Chilhowee Mountain argued that drainage from the homes would pollute Abrams Creek, threatening three endangered species of fish. The construction group denied the accusation, claiming it had complied with all local, state, and federal regulations, and had sought technical guidance from independent environmental firms. The group received preliminary approval for construction from the Blount County Planning Commission in May 2006.
