= Old Glory (disambiguation) =

Old Glory is a common nickname for the flag of the United States, bestowed by William Driver.

Old Glory may also refer to:

- "Old Glory" (King of the Hill), an episode of the TV show, King of the Hill
- Old Glory (film), a 1939 Merrie Melodies short
- Old Glory, Arizona, an unincorporated community
- Old Glory, Tennessee, an unincorporated community
- Old Glory, Texas, an unincorporated community in Stonewall County, Texas, US
- Old Glory (aircraft), a Fokker lost in 1927 during an attempt to fly from the United States to Italy
- Old Glory: An American Voyage, 1981 travel book by Jonathan Raban
- The Old Glory, a play written by the poet Robert Lowell
- Koumansetta rainfordi, or Old glory, a Goby from the Western Pacific
- Old Glory, a 1916 book by Mary Raymond Shipman Andrews
- Old Glory DC, a professional rugby union team playing in Washington, DC
- Old Glory Mountain, a summit in Canada
