= Armona =

Armona can refer to:

- Armona, California
  - Armona Union School District
- Armona, Tennessee
- Armona Island, Algarve, Portugal
- Armona River, Lithuania
