= Old Glory, Tennessee =

Unincorporated community in Tennessee, US

Coordinates: 35°46′35″N 84°01′32″W

Old Glory is an unincorporated community in Blount County, in the U.S. state of Tennessee.

== History ==
A gas station owner who painted his building the colors of Old Glory caused the surrounding community's name to be adopted.
