= Montvale Springs =

- Resort, campground
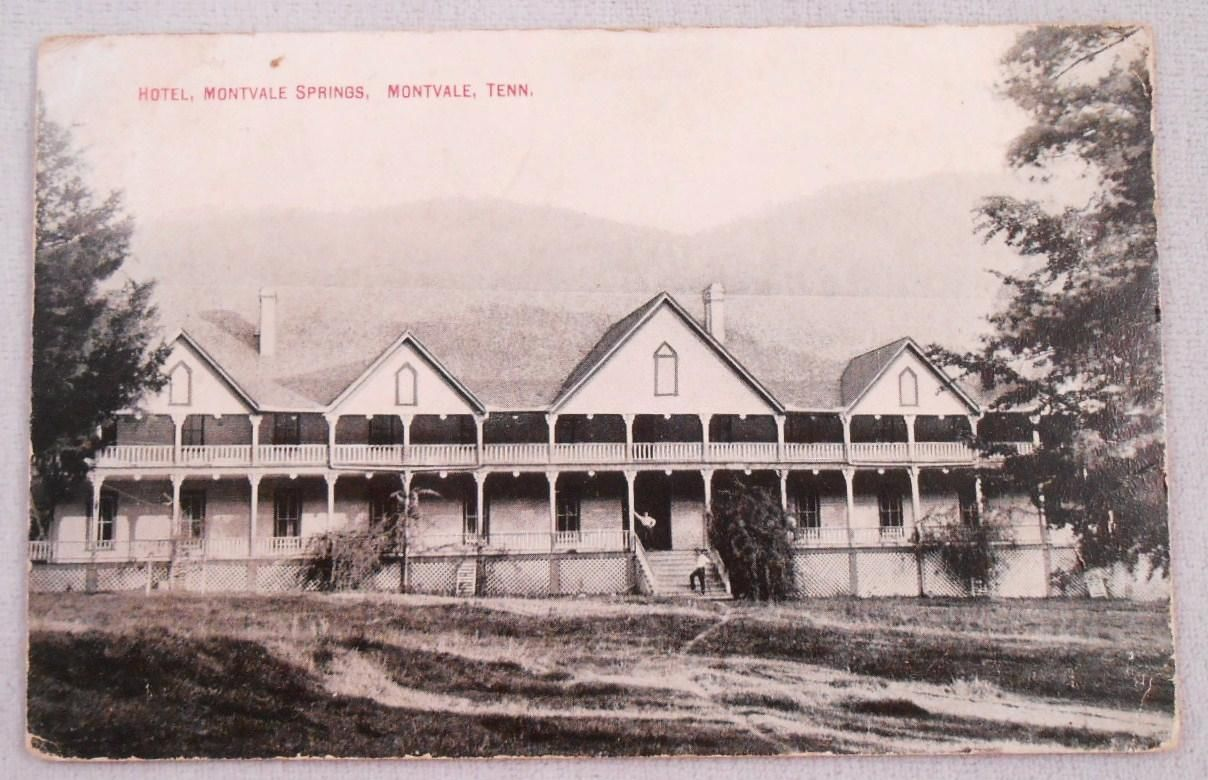
- 1910 postcard of the third hotel

- Location in Tennessee
- Coordinates: 35.640309°N 83.961694°W
- Country: United States
- State: Tennessee
- County: Blount
- First resort hotel: 1832
- Founder: Daniel Davis Foute

Area
  - Total: 4,500 acres (1,800 ha)
- Elevation: 1,234 ft (376 m)
- Time zone: UTC-5 (Eastern (EST))
  - Summer (DST): UTC-4 (EDT)
- Area code: 865
- GNIS feature ID: 1308084

Montvale Springs is a location in Blount County, Tennessee, United States, that was once the site of a fashionable resort hotel, and is now a summer camp.

== Early years ==
It is said that Sam Houston, later president of the Republic of Texas, discovered the springs that gave the resort its name. The vicinity of Montvale Springs was used as the locale for the novel by Charles W. Todd, Woodville; Or Anchoret Reclaimed (1832).

In 1832 the local entrepreneur Daniel Davis Foute bought 6,300 acres (2,500 ha) of land on Chilhowee Mountain, including a black sulphur spring, and built a ten-room log hotel. Foute used Cherokee laborers to build roads to connect the hotel to turnpikes to Georgia and North Carolina. He planted vineyards and orchards. The hotel was first advertised in 1832. It was described as a "resort hotel and spa". The two story building was "pretentious rustic" in style.

The hotel attracted a wealthy clientele from throughout the Cumberland Valley and the lower Mississippi Basin. They came to relax with their families and to drink "... the healing waters of the springs." A stage line from Knoxville to Montvale was open by 1837. If guests caught the 6:30 a.m. stage coach in Knoxville they would reach the hotel in time for lunch at noon. In the 1840s the hotel included a store. Foute is listed as operating a post office at "Montvail Springs" in 1846.

== Seven Gables ==
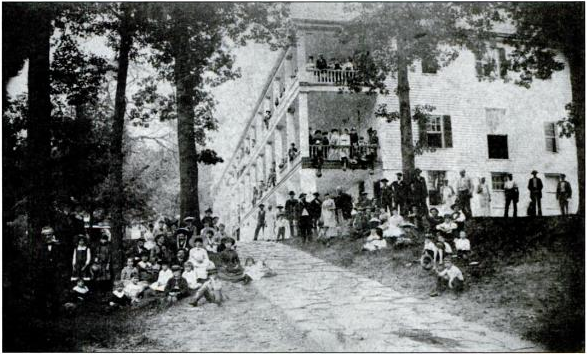
West end of Seven Gables Hotel in 1884

In 1850 Foute sold 3,840 acres (1,550 ha) including the hotel to Asa Watson. Watson tore down the log hotel in 1853 and built a much grander structure. The new three-story hotel was named "The Seven Gables Hotel", an elegant building with large porches on each floor, 200 feet (61 m) long. The hotel, with 125 rooms, could accommodate 300–400 guests and was the largest in the region. There were also sixty cottages, some for use by the servants of the guests.

Watson landscaped the site with exotic trees and bushes from as far afield as Japan and California, some of which are still present. (Note: Ginkgo trees are found today on the western slopes of the Great Smoky Mountains, probably from seeds of the trees planted on the Seven Gables lawn.) The hotel became known as "The Saratoga of the South". At its peak, Montvale was one of the most fashionable of the great watering places, providing luxurious accommodation, food and entertainment. Railroad communication between Georgia and Knoxville made the Springs much more accessible. In the summer of 1857 the Maryville East Tennessean reported that the Springs were "'All the go' nowadays. Passengers go through this place by fifties". By the late 1850s the majority of the guests were from Georgia. Some guests would spend the entire summer at the resort, paying $40 per month for room and board to escape from the heat of the south.

The spa's water was advertised as providing a cure for a great range of health conditions. John Jennings Moorman, who spent several weeks at the springs in the summer of 1854, noted that the waters as analyzed by Professor Mitchell contained sodium chloride, magnesium sulfates, lime, soda, and lime and iron carbonates. He said the waters proved effective in curing many dyspeptic depravities. They had a high reputation for curing chronic diarrhea, a common and often fatal disease, when used in moderation. However, the Confederate general Daniel Smith Donelson died of chronic diarrhea at the resort on 17 April 1863.

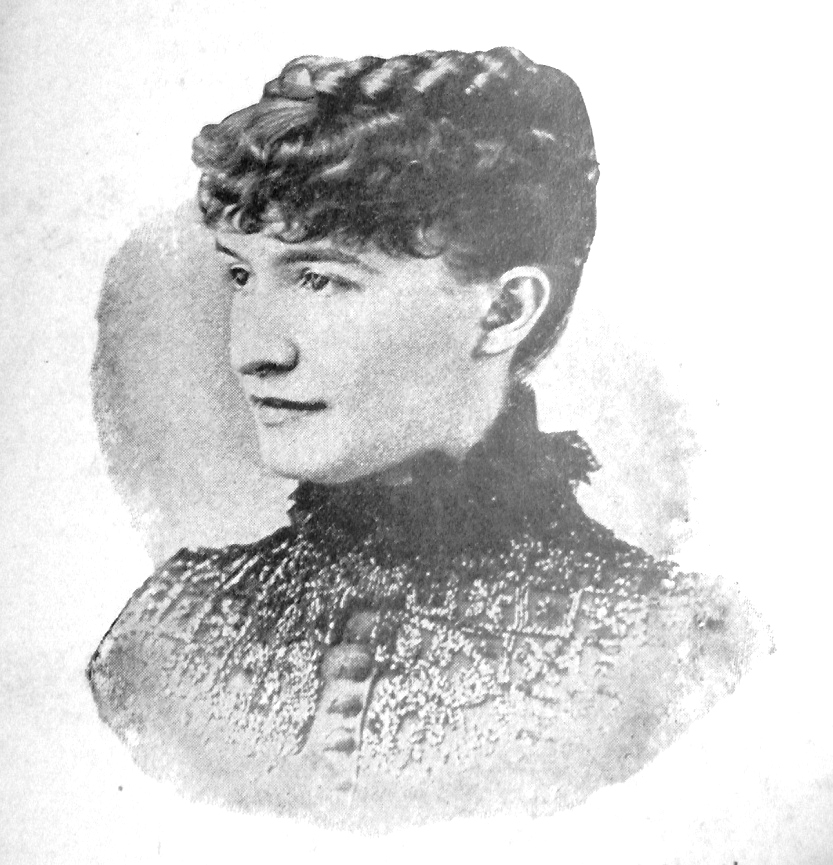
Mary Noailles Murfree visited the resort often, and wrote stories of the local mountain people.

Sterling Lanier became the manager of the hotel in 1857. He and his brother bought the property in 1860. The Laniers paid $25,674 for the hotel and spent $15,000 on renovations to the building and its 4,500 acres (1,800 ha), hiring a Swiss gardener and two landscape gardeners. Lanier also brought in a French chef. The Swiss geologist Arnold Henry Guyot, after whom Mount Guyot is named, visited Montvale in 1859 during his survey of the Great Smoky Mountains. Sterling Lanier's grandson was the poet Sidney Lanier. Lanier conceived of his only novel, Tiger Lilies (1868), while staying at the resort in 1860. The first half of the novel is autobiographical, describing his vacation at the hotel. With the outbreak of the American Civil War (1861–65) Lanier closed the hotel, which he sold in 1863, and returned to Alabama.

After the war the wealthy southern clientele did not return. With no direct railroad service, the hotel was forced to rely on guests from closer by, with less money to spend. Various owners after the war improved the hotel, adding a ballroom, bar and piazza for smokers. Guests could play in the new billiard hall, with three tables, in the ten-pin bowling alley or on the croquet pitch. Mary Noailles Murfree often visited the resort after 1886 to find new material for her stories of the mountain people. Although she was known for the realism of her tales, in fact she was from a wealthy family and would have had little real contact with the local people while staying at the resort. Montvale Springs was incorporated as a town on 28 March 1891. The hotel was destroyed by fire in 1896.

== Third hotel ==
The Little River Railroad made the area accessible in 1901. In 1902 Andrew Gamble of Knoxville built a new hotel on the site. The new hotel mainly served middle-class guests from Maryville and Knoxville. The new hotel was smaller, with room for 100 guests. Ludwig Pflanze, of Maryville, purchased the hotel in 1911. He built a dam across the creek that created "Lake Sidney Lanier". With the advent of the automobile, allowing for much easier travel to more distant locations, Montvale Springs and other small resorts went out of fashion. On 20 November 1933 the hotel was burned down and was not rebuilt.

== Summer camp ==
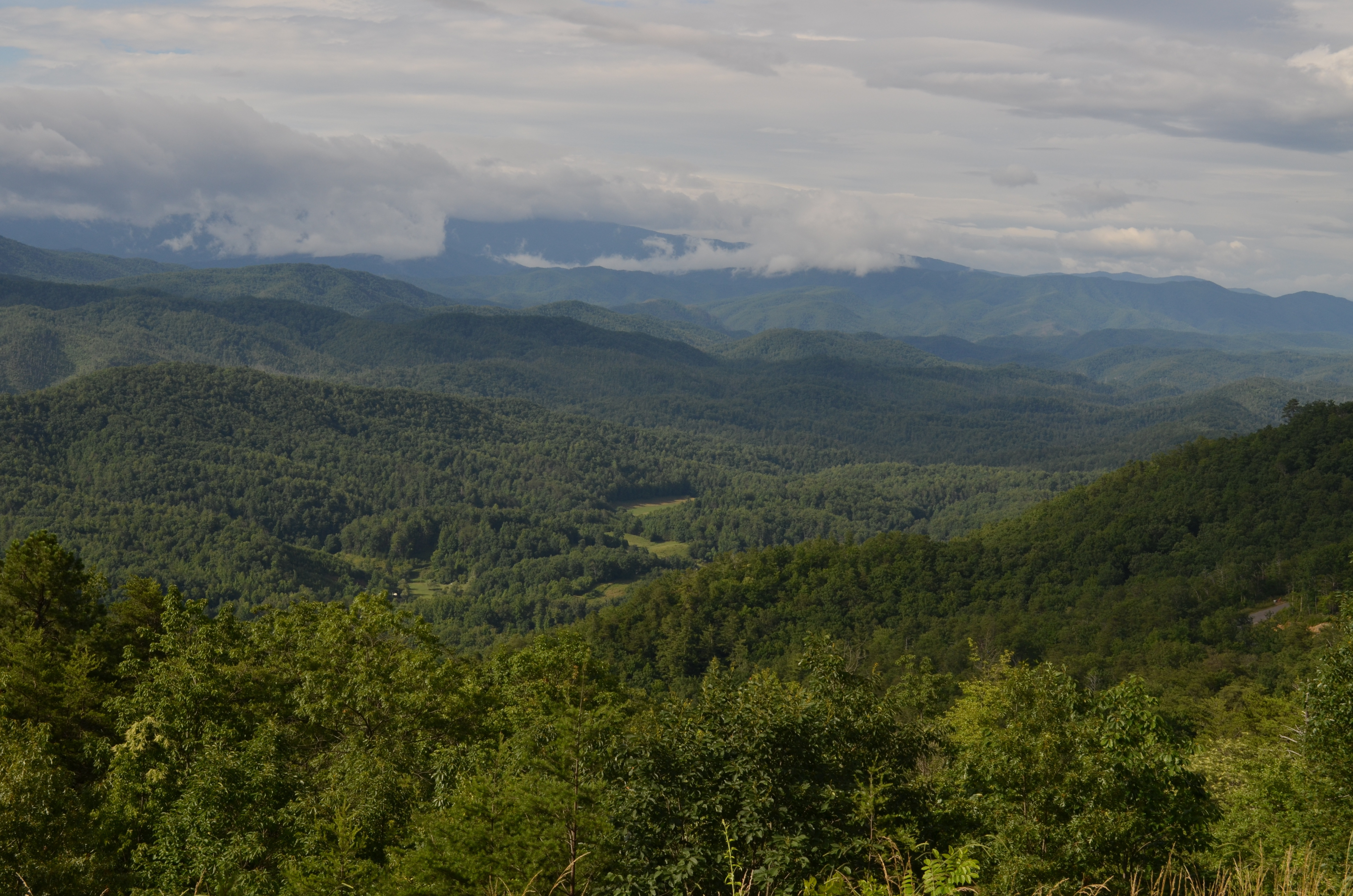
View of the nearby country from the Foothills Parkway

The site of the former hotel at Montvale Springs was unused until 1947, when the Knoxville YMCA purchased the property. The YMCA arranged for summer camps and group retreats for children and families, with a range of outdoor sports and activities. Over the years that followed the camp was steadily improved with construction of a Director's cottage, cabins, band stand, spring house, ball field, Rotary chapel and caretaker's house. The Seven Gables Pavilion was built on the site of the original hotel, entered by the original stone steps. Major renovations were undertaken in 1998 in preparation for celebration of the 50th anniversary of the camp.

The East Tennessee YMCA decided to discontinue residential camping after the 2005 season. It seemed probable that the property would be sold and redeveloped as an upscale residential community. However, a group named the Friends of Camp Montvale was formed. The Harmony Property Group purchased the site, with an agreement that the Friends of Camp Montvale would reopen and run the camp. However, Harmony Property Group found itself in difficulty after launching an 80-lot development just before the 2008 financial crisis, and was foreclosed on by Knoxville auctioneer Sam Furrow. Furrow's Camp Investment LLC leased the property to Harmony Adoptions, and in 2012 successfully secured a protective easement to prevent any future development.

== Sources ==
- Banker, Mark T. (2011-02-01). Appalachians All: East Tennesseans and the Elusive History of an American Region. Univ. of Tennessee Press. ISBN 978-1-57233-786-2.
- Brown, Fred (2005). Marking Time: East Tennessee Historical Markers and the Stories Behind Them. Univ. of Tennessee Press. ISBN 978-1-57233-330-7.
- Buchanan, John P. (1891). "Chapter 226". Acts of the State of Tennessee Passed at the General Assembly. F.M. Paul, printer to the State.
- Cotham, Steve (2006). The Great Smoky Mountains National Park. Arcadia Publishing. ISBN 978-0-7385-4349-9.
- Dunn, Durwood (1989-08-15). Cades Cove: Life and Death of a Southern Appalachian Community. Univ. of Tennessee Press. ISBN 978-1-57233-764-0.
- Eicher, John H.; Eicher, David J. (2001). Civil War High Commands. Stanford University Press. ISBN 0-8047-3641-3.
- Groce, Todd W. (2000-07-01). Mountain Rebels: East Tennessee Confederates and the Civil War, 1860-1870. Univ. of Tennessee Press. ISBN 978-1-57233-093-1.
- "History". Friends of Camp Montvale.
- "History". Harmony Family Center.
- Martin, C. Brenden (2007). Tourism in the Mountain South: A Double-edged Sword. Univ. of Tennessee Press. ISBN 978-1-57233-575-2.
- Moorman, John Jennings (1859). The Virginia springs, and springs of the South and West. J.B. Lippincott & co.
- Pierce, Daniel S. (2000). The Great Smokies: From Natural Habitat to National Park. Univ. of Tennessee Press. ISBN 978-1-57233-079-5.
- Sakowski, Carolyn (2007). Touring the East Tennessee Backroads. John F. Blair, Publisher. ISBN 978-0-89587-476-4.
- U.S. Post Office Dept (1846). United States Official Postal Guide.
