= Top of the World, Tennessee =

Top of the World
- Unincorporated community
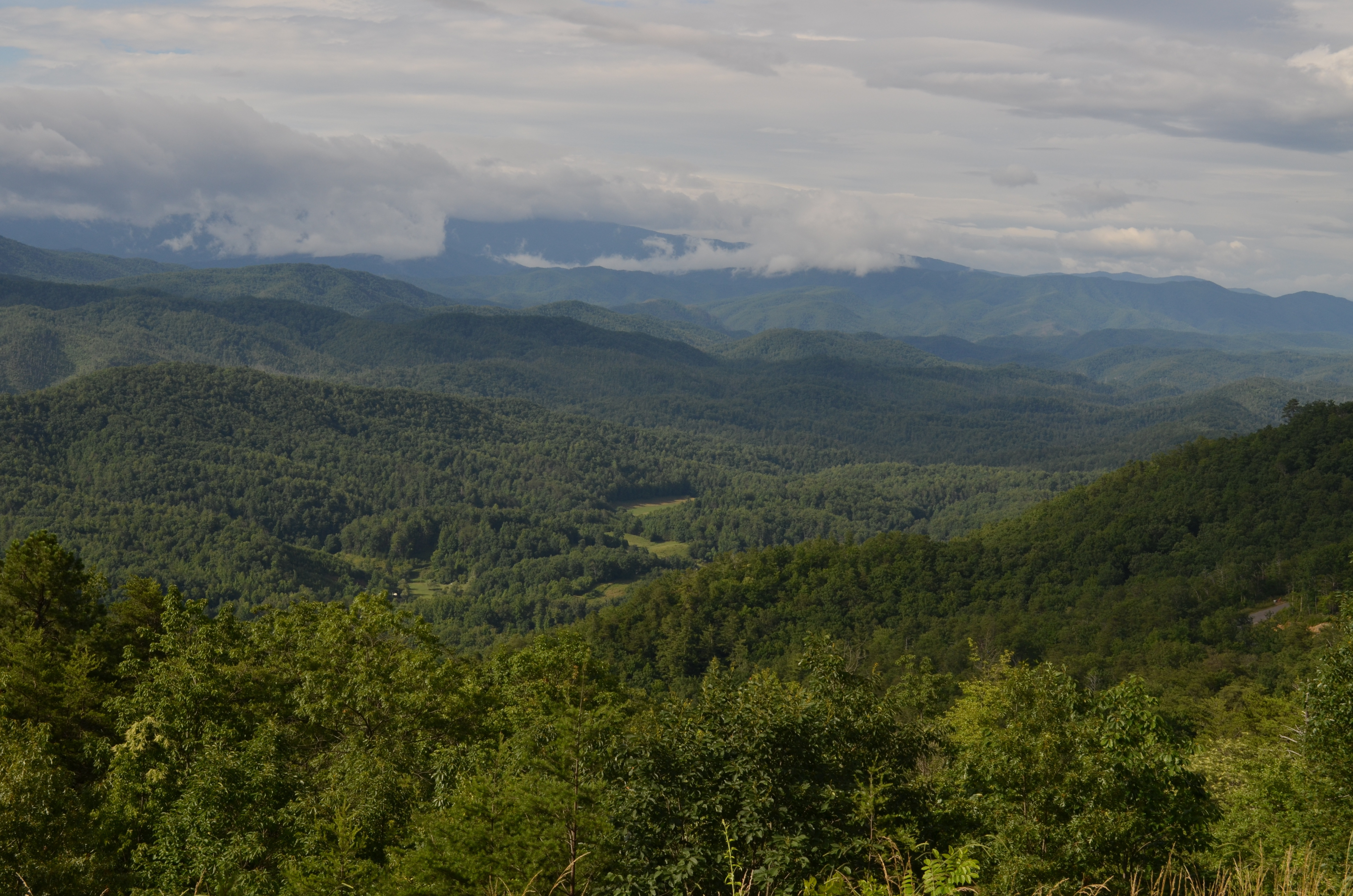
- Overlook from Foothills Parkway, July 2013

- Location within the state of Tennessee
- Coordinates: 35.65453°N 83.91043°W
- Country: United States
- State: Tennessee
- County: Blount
- Founded: 1965
- Elevation: 2,024 ft (617 m)
- Time zone: UTC-5 (Eastern (EST))
  - Summer (DST): UTC-4 (EDT)
- ZIP code: 37878
- Area code: 865
- GNIS feature ID: 1272776

Top of the World (alternately, Top O' the World and Top of The World Estates) is an unincorporated community in rural Blount County, Tennessee.

== History ==
The land was originally the home of the Cherokee Nation, who were mostly displaced to Oklahoma along the Trail of Tears in 1838. A grant of 5,000 acres (2,000 ha) was made to Daniel D. Foute in 1837. This included the area now covered by Top of the World, which was purchased by a developer in the early 1960s. Construction of the Top of World Estates by Roy and Charles Headrick was reported by the Knoxville News Sentinel in June 1965. The community surrounds Lake in the Sky, a 52.5-acre (21.2 ha) artificial lake formed by a dam built in 1966.

== Geography ==
The community lies in an area called The Flats, on a spur of Chilhowee Mountain in East Tennessee. The surrounding country is rugged. The Foothills Parkway passes just to the northwest, and the boundary of the Great Smoky Mountains National Park lies just to the southeast. The neighboring park has a natural forest environment of yellow pines and hardwood species. Controlled burns are used to reduce the risk of uncontrolled fires. There is a healthy black bear population.

The community is relatively isolated. The Foothills Parkway is the only road to Top of the World that is passable by school bus. Otherwise it must be accessed by steep and winding secondary roads.

== Community ==
Residents may belong to the Top of the World Landowners' Association (TOWLA). The Blount County Fire Protection District has its station #8 at 5714 Flats Road, on the east shore of the lake. The fire station officially came into service when the TOWLA and the Blount County Fire Protection District signed a contract on 23 March 2012. There is no local school. School children are taken by bus along the Foothills Parkway to nearby Walland. There is no post office in Top of The World. The nearest post office is in Walland.
