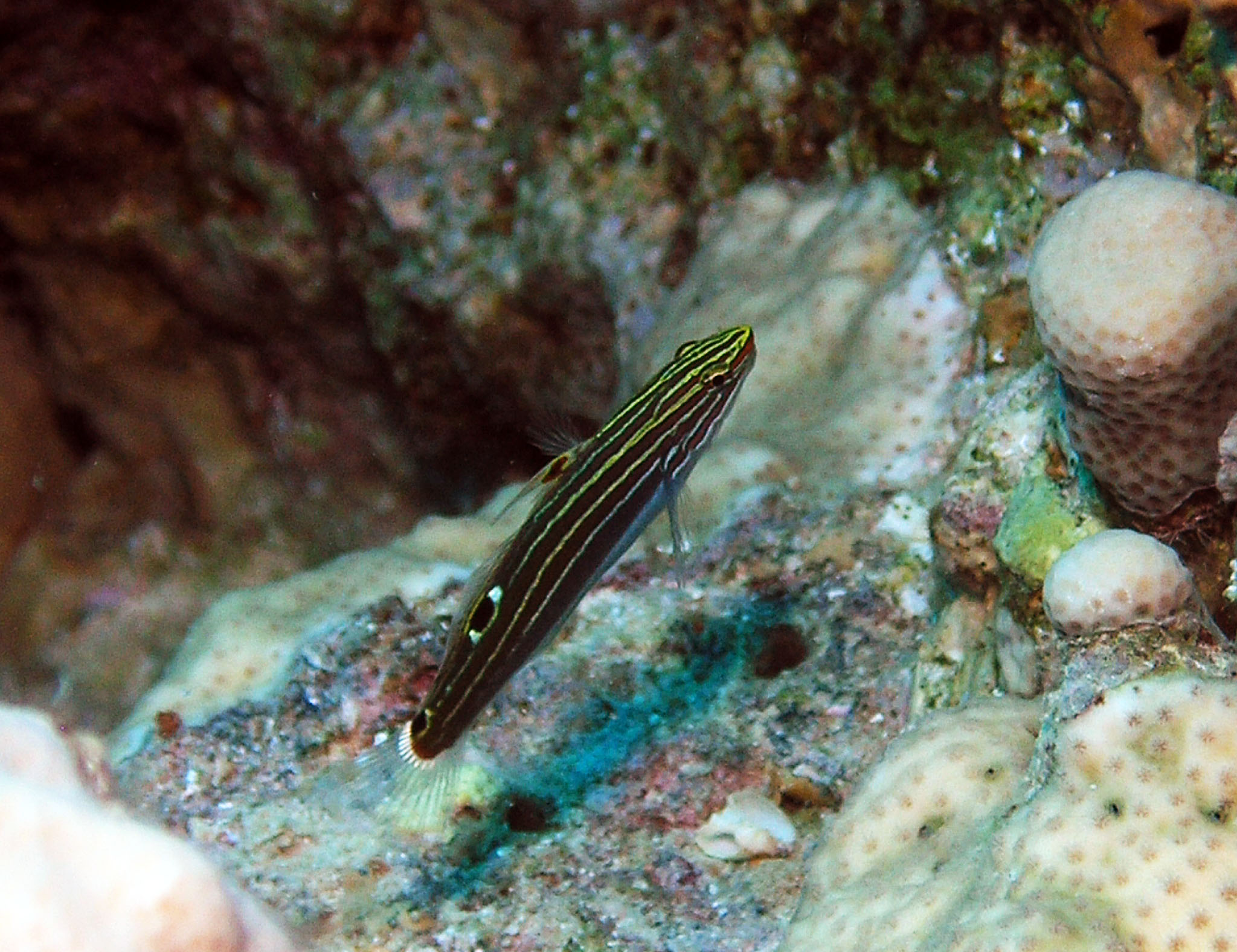
- Hector's Goby (K. hectori)
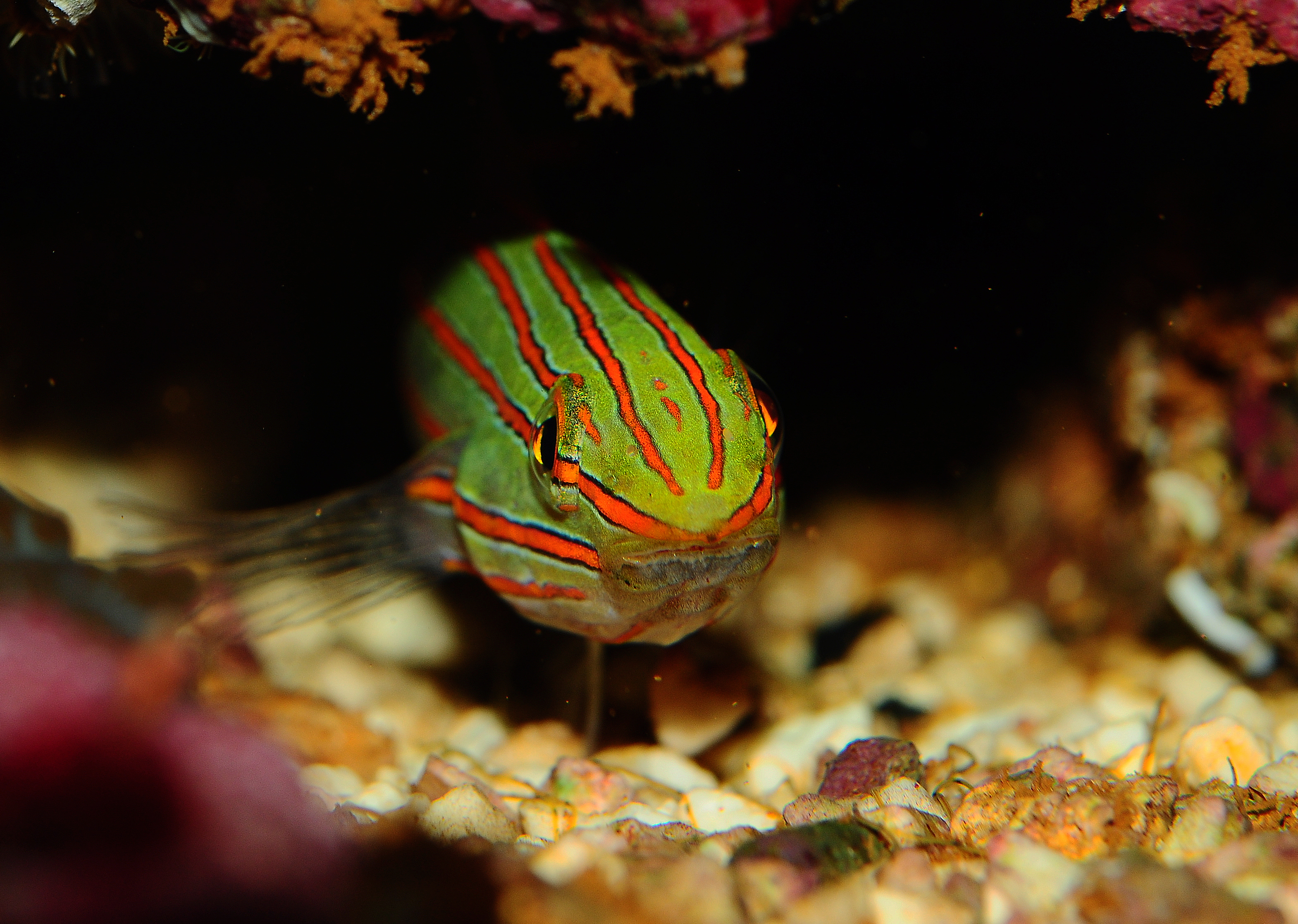
- Old Glory (K. rainfordi)

Scientific classification
- Domain: Eukaryota
- Kingdom: Animalia
- Phylum: Chordata
- Class: Actinopterygii
- Order: Gobiiformes
- Family: Gobiidae
- Genus: Koumansetta; Whitley, 1940

Type species
- Koumansetta rainfordi Whitley, 1940

= Koumansetta =

Genus of fishes

Koumansetta is a small genus of gobies native to the Indian Ocean and the western Pacific Ocean. The name of this genus honours the Dutch ichthyologist and goby taxonomist Frederik Petrus Koumans (1905-1977) of the Rijksmuseum van Natuurlijke Historie in Leiden, Netherlands, who had written a description of Koumansetta rainfordi following a visit to the Australian Museum in Sydney in 1938 but did not name it. The outbreak of World War II meant that Whitley's correspondence with Koumans was interrupted, so he named this genus after him, noting “which will enshrine memories of happier days of our meetings in Leiden and Sydney”.

== Species ==
There are currently three recognized species in this genus:

- Koumansetta hectori (J. L. B. Smith, 1957) (Hector's goby)
- Koumansetta rainfordi Whitley, 1940 (Old glory, Court Jester Goby)
- Koumansetta hoesei (Marcelo Kovačić, Sergey V. Bogorodsky, Ahmad Osman Mal), 2018
