= Armona Union Academy =

- Armona, California; United States

Information
- Type: Private
- Religious affiliation: Seventh-day Adventist Church
- Principal: Randall Bovee
- Grades: K - 12 Academy
- Colors: Red, Black
- Mascot: Jaguar
- Newspaper: Jaguar Junction
- Accreditation: Adventist Accrediting Association
- Website: www.auaweb.com

Armona Union Academy (AUA) is a K-12 school in Armona, California owned and operated by the Seventh-day Adventist Church. Established in 1904, AUA is the only Seventh-day Adventist high school in the surrounding area. It is a part of the Seventh-day Adventist education system, the world's second largest Christian school system. in Kings County, California. The school is governed by a board composed of the pastors (ex officio) and elected members from several area Adventist Churches.

== See also ==
- List of Seventh-day Adventist secondary schools
- Seventh-day Adventist education
