= Disco, Tennessee =

Disco
- Unincorporated community
- Location within Tennessee Location within the United States
- Coordinates: 35°47′09″N 84°09′30″W
- Country: United States
- State: Tennessee
- County: Blount
- Elevation: 906 ft (276 m)
- Time zone: UTC-5 (Eastern (EST))
  - Summer (DST): UTC-4 (EDT)
- Area code: 865
- GNIS feature ID: 1314948

Disco is an unincorporated community in Blount County, Tennessee. Its post office closed in 1903.

It is unknown why the name "Disco" was applied to this community. Disco has been noted for its unusual place name.
