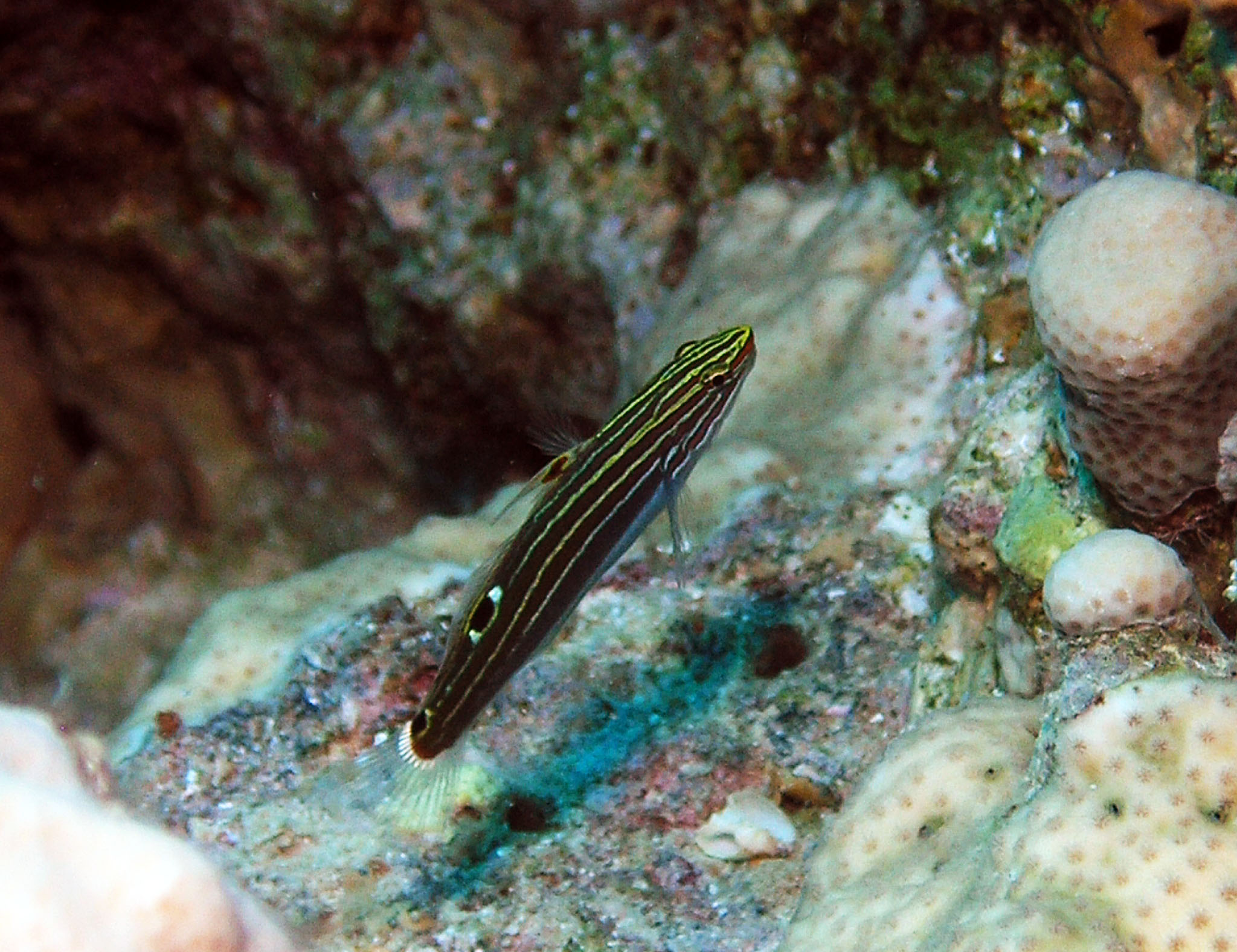

Conservation status
- Least Concern (IUCN 3.1)

Scientific classification
- Kingdom: Animalia
- Phylum: Chordata
- Class: Actinopterygii
- Division: Teleostei
- Order: Gobiiformes
- Family: Gobiidae
- Genus: Koumansetta
- Species: K. hectori

Binomial name
- Koumansetta hectori (J. L. B. Smith, 1957)

Synonyms
- Seychellea hectori J. L. B. Smith, 1957; Amblygobius hectori (J. L. B. Smith, 1957)

= Hector's goby =

Species of fish

Hector's goby (Koumansetta hectori) is a species of goby native to the Indian Ocean (including the Red Sea) to the islands of Micronesia in the western Pacific Ocean. It can be found on sheltered coral reefs at depths of from 3 to 30 metres (9.8 to 98.4 ft) (though usually between 5 and 20 metres (16 and 66 ft)). This species reaches a length of 8.5 centimetres (3.3 in) SL. It can also be found in the aquarium trade. The specific name honours Gordon Hector (born 1918) who was Chief Secretary to the Government of the Seychelles, in gratitude for his help to Smith's work in the Seychelles.
