= Fairfield, Blount County, Tennessee =

Fairfield
- Unincorporated community
- Location within Tennessee Location within the United States
- Coordinates: 35°45′48″N 83°52′06″W
- Country: United States
- State: Tennessee
- County: Blount
- Elevation: 981 ft (299 m)
- Time zone: UTC-5 (Eastern (EST))
  - Summer (DST): UTC-4 (EDT)
- Area code: 865
- GNIS feature ID: 1308051

Fairfield is an unincorporated community in Blount County, Tennessee. Fairfield is 5.8 miles (9.3 km) east of Maryville.
