= Daniel Davis Foute =

American frontiersman (1799-1865)

- Born: 1799; Blount County, Tennessee
- Died: 1865 (aged 65–66); Knoxville, Tennessee
- Occupation: Entrepreneur
- Known for: Cades Cove Bloomary Forge

Daniel Davis Foute (1799–1865) was an American entrepreneur who did much to develop Cades Cove in Blount County, Tennessee. He built an iron forge, launched a resort hotel, and built various roads in the region. After siding with the Confederates in the American Civil War he lost most of his fortune and died insolvent.

== Family ==
Foute was born in 1799 in Blount County, son of Jacob Foute and Catherine Fauble. He married Dorcas M King (1804–1866). Their children included Thomas (born 1824), Jane (born 1827) and Obediah Boaz (1840–1875). Another daughter was Ethelinda Foute Eagleton, born in 1835 in Maryville. Foute became active in Blount County administration. He was clerk of the Blount Circuit Court in 1822–36 and 1840–48, and a justice of the peace in 1856–62.

== Enterprises ==
=== Iron forge ===
The Great Smoky Mountains in Tennessee do not contain much iron ore, but the small deposits of ore were valuable. Starting in the 1820s Foute purchased large amounts of land in and around Cades Cove with the aim of working the iron. He built a forge on Forge Creek in 1827 near the John P. Cable mill. Forge Creek takes its name from the mill. Most of the Cherokees had left, but many of those who remained worked at the forge. In the long term the forge became unprofitable because of the low quality of the ore, the high cost of fuel, and competition from other regions made possible by improved transportation. It closed after 20 years.

=== Montvale Springs resort ===
In 1832 Foute bought 6,300 acres (2,500 ha) of land on Chilhowee Mountain, including a black sulphur spring, and built a ten-room log hotel. Foute used Cherokee laborers to build roads to connect the hotel to turnpikes to Georgia and North Carolina. He planted vineyards and orchards. The Montvale Springs hotel was first advertised in 1832. It was described as a "resort hotel and spa". A stage line from Knoxville to Montvale was open by 1837. The resort became popular with elite from throughout the southern states. For many years the hotel was managed by the grandfather of poet and author Sidney Lanier. In the 1840s the hotel included a store. Foute is listed as operating a post office at "Montvail Springs" in 1846. In 1850 Foute sold 3,840 acres (1,550 ha) including the hotel to Asa Watson. Watson tore down the log hotel in 1853 and built a much grander structure.

=== Cades Cove development ===
Foute devoted his efforts developing the potential of Cades Cove, which he envisioned as an industrial and commercial center in the rich agricultural land. Foute bought large holdings of land from residents who were selling out to move to newly opened land in the western states, including mountain land and property in the farming basin of Cades Cove. He surveyed the mountains, looking for gold and copper.

In 1849 Foute moved to Cades Cove, where he built a frame house. (Note: The National Park Service destroyed Foute's house at Cades Code and all other frame houses in the late 1930s.) In January 1852 Foute was authorized to open a turnpike road in Blount County from Six Mile Creek or Crooked Creek to the border of North Carolina. It would be four feet wide at first, later upgraded to a second class road when justified by demand. Foute was required to maintain the road, and in return he would receive tolls from travelers. The turnpike, later called the Cooper Road, connected Cades Cove to Knoxville via Maryville and his Montvale Springs resort. He built roads connecting Cades Cove to other communities. In 1852 Foute built a road from Cades Cove through Chestnut Flats to meet Parson's Turnpike to North Carolina.

== Political activity ==
Foute owned many slaves in his properties in Blount County, but the censuses of 1850 and 1860 do not report any slaves at Cades Cove. During the American Civil War Foute sympathized with the Confederates. His son, Bose Foute, joined the Confederate army. At the end of the war Union troops arrested him and took him from his sick bed to the jail in Knoxville. He was paroled but died soon after. Although Foute had to sell much of his land, at the time of his death he still had over 20,000 acres (8,100 ha). In 1866 the chancery court determined that Foute's estate was insolvent. His land holdings were sold in three public auctions.
