= Armona, Tennessee =

Unincorporated community in Tennessee, US

Coordinates: 35°47′14″N 84°00′51″W

Armona is an unincorporated community in Blount County, Tennessee, in the United States.

The origin of the name Armona is uncertain, but it may refer to a type of strawberry.
