= Armona, California =

- Census-designated place
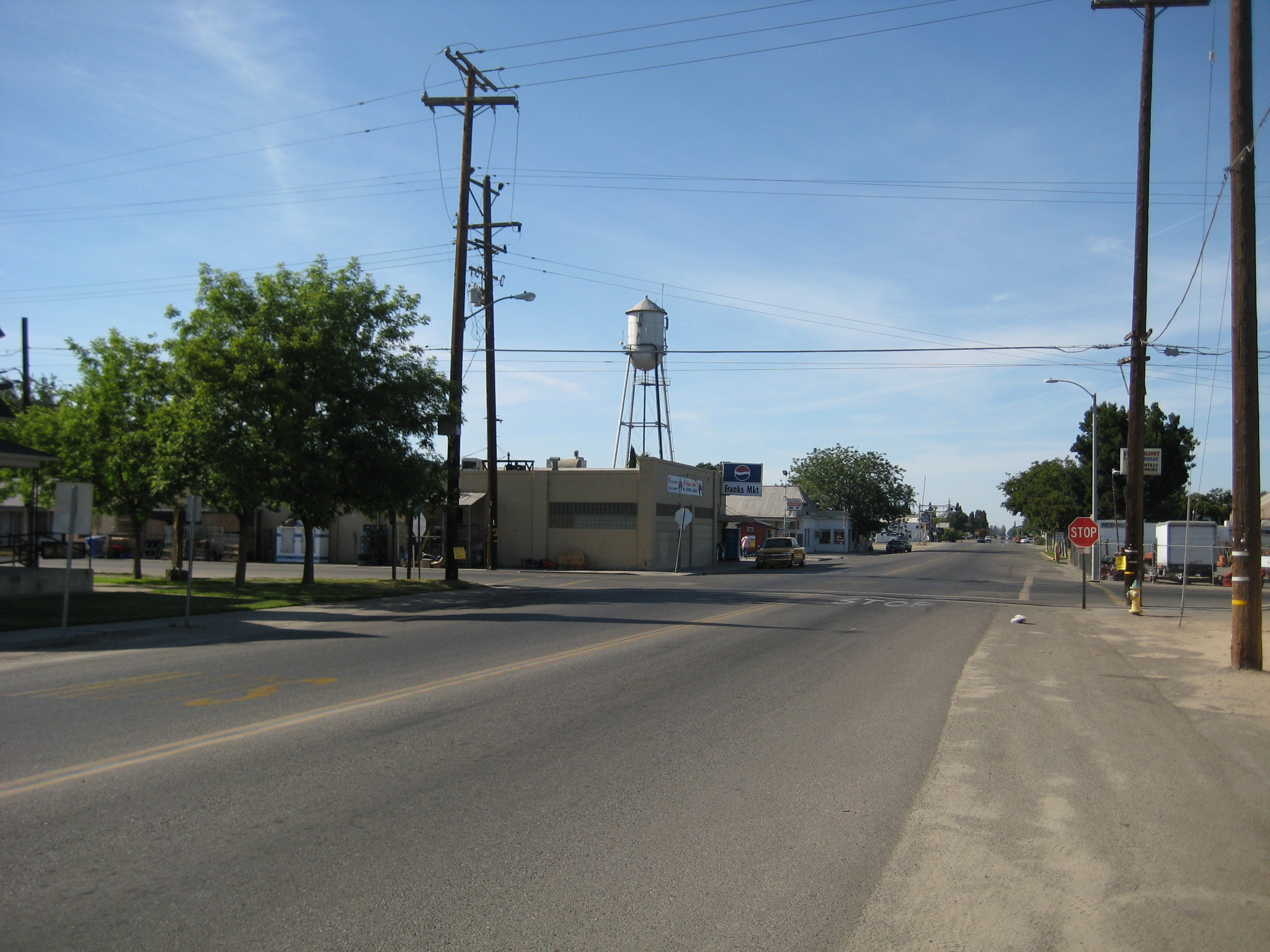
- Armona, California

- Location in Kings County and the state of California

- Location in the United States
- Coordinates: 36°18′57″N 119°42′30″W
- Country: United States
- State: California
- County: Kings

Area
  - Total: 2.05 sq mi (5.32 km^{2})
  - Land: 2.05 sq mi (5.32 km^{2})
  - Water: 0 sq mi (0.00 km^{2}) 0%
- Elevation: 240 ft (73 m)

Population (2020)
  - Total: 4,274
  - Density: 2,081.9/sq mi (803.81/km^{2})
- Time zone: UTC−8 (Pacific (PST))
  - Summer (DST): UTC−7 (PDT)
- ZIP code: 93202
- Area code: 559
- FIPS code: 06-02700
- GNIS feature IDs: 1652665, 2407762

Armona is a census-designated place (CDP) in Kings County, California, United States. Armona is located 3.5 miles (5.6 km) west-southwest of Hanford, at an elevation of 239 feet (73 m). It is part of the Hanford-Corcoran metropolitan area. The population was 4,274 at the 2020 census. Armona's motto is "Small and Proud".

== Geography ==
Armona is located in northern Kings County at 36°18′57″N 119°42′30″W. California State Route 198 passes through the community, leading east into Hanford, the county seat, and west 4 miles (6 km) to Lemoore.

According to the United States Census Bureau, the CDP has a total area of 2.05 square miles (5.3 km^{2}), all land.

== History ==
The name "Armona" was applied to a railroad station in the 1880s. It was subsequently transferred to the present location on the Southern Pacific Railroad in 1891. Reportedly, the name was coined by transposing the first two letters of the name "Ramona".

The first school in the Armona vicinity was the Giddings School built in 1880. The Giddings School District was renamed Armona in 1907. A new brick school house was constructed in the early 1920s. As that structure did not comply with California's earthquake standards (the Field Act), it was replaced in 1953 with what is now the Armona Elementary School.

The Armona post office was established in 1887.

== Demographics ==
Historical population
Census	Pop.	Note	%±
1950	1,274		—
1960	1,302		2.2%
1970	1,392		6.9%
1980	2,644		89.9%
1990	3,122		18.1%
2000	3,239		3.7%
2010	4,156		28.3%
2020	4,274		2.8%
U.S. Decennial Census; 1860–1870 1880-1890; 1900 1910 1920; 1930 1940 1950; 1960 1970 1980; 1990 2000 2010

Armona first appeared as an unincorporated community in the 1950 U.S. census; and as a census-designated place in the 1980 United States census.

=== 2020 census ===
As of the 2020 census, Armona had a population of 4,274. The population density was 2,081.8 inhabitants per square mile (803.8/km^{2}). The median age was 31.2 years. The age distribution was 30.3% under the age of 18, 10.3% aged 18 to 24, 26.6% aged 25 to 44, 22.1% aged 45 to 64, and 10.7% who were 65 years of age or older. For every 100 females, there were 94.1 males, and for every 100 females age 18 and over, there were 94.8 males age 18 and over.

97.3% of residents lived in urban areas, while 2.7% lived in rural areas.

The whole population lived in households. There were 1,241 households, of which 45.2% included children under the age of 18. Of all households, 51.7% were married-couple households, 6.9% were cohabiting couple households, 14.7% had a male householder with no spouse or partner present, and 26.6% had a female householder with no spouse or partner present. About 16.4% of all households were made up of individuals, and 6.7% had someone living alone who was 65 years of age or older. The average household size was 3.44. There were 983 families (79.2% of all households).

There were 1,279 housing units at an average density of 623.0 units per square mile (240.5 units/km^{2}), of which 1,241 (97.0%) were occupied. Of these, 61.2% were owner-occupied and 38.8% were occupied by renters. There were 38 vacant housing units (3.0% of total housing units). The homeowner vacancy rate was 1.3%, and the rental vacancy rate was 0.8%.

Racial composition as of the 2020 census
Race	Number	Percent
White	1,290	30.2%
Black or African American	132	3.1%
American Indian and Alaska Native	78	1.8%
Asian	93	2.2%
Native Hawaiian and Other Pacific Islander	1	0.0%
Some other race	1,748	40.9%
Two or more races	932	21.8%
Hispanic or Latino (of any race)	3,176	74.3%

== Economy ==
In 2023, the US Census Bureau estimated that the median income for a household in the CDP was $60,100, and the median income for a family was $60,991. The per capita income for the CDP was $19,293. About 12.2% of families and 11.7% of the population were below the poverty line, including 15.2% of those under age 18 and 4.3% of those age 65 or over. It was estimated that 10.5% of people were unemployed.

== Transportation ==
=== Bus ===
Kings Area Regional Transit (KART) operates regularly scheduled fixed route bus service, vanpool service for commuters and Dial-A-Ride (demand response) services throughout Kings County as well as to Fresno .

=== Major highway ===
Highway 198

=== Rail ===
Amtrak does not have a station in Armona but does provide passenger service to Hanford, which is 3.5 miles (5.6 km) east of Armona. Freight service is available from the San Joaquin Valley Railroad, which passes through Armona.

== Education ==
Public schools in the community are operated by the Armona Union Elementary School District. They include:

- Armona Elementary School
- Parkview Middle School

The district also sponsors the Crossroads Charter Academy, a K-12 independent study charter school.

There is one K-12 private school, Armona Union Academy, which is operated by the Seventh-day Adventist Church.

Armona is in the Hanford Joint Union High School District.

Nearby community colleges include West Hills College Lemoore and the Hanford center of College of the Sequoias.

== Government ==
In the California State Legislature, Armona is in the 16th senatorial district, represented by Democrat Melissa Hurtado, and in the 33rd Assembly district, represented by Republican Alexandra Macedo.

In the United States House of Representatives, Armona is in California's 22nd District and is represented by Republican David Valadao. Armona is represented on the Kings County Board of Supervisors by Rusty Robinson.

== Notable people ==
Lyn Lary played shortstop for six different teams in his twelve-year career in Major League Baseball including with the New York Yankees

== Notable sites ==
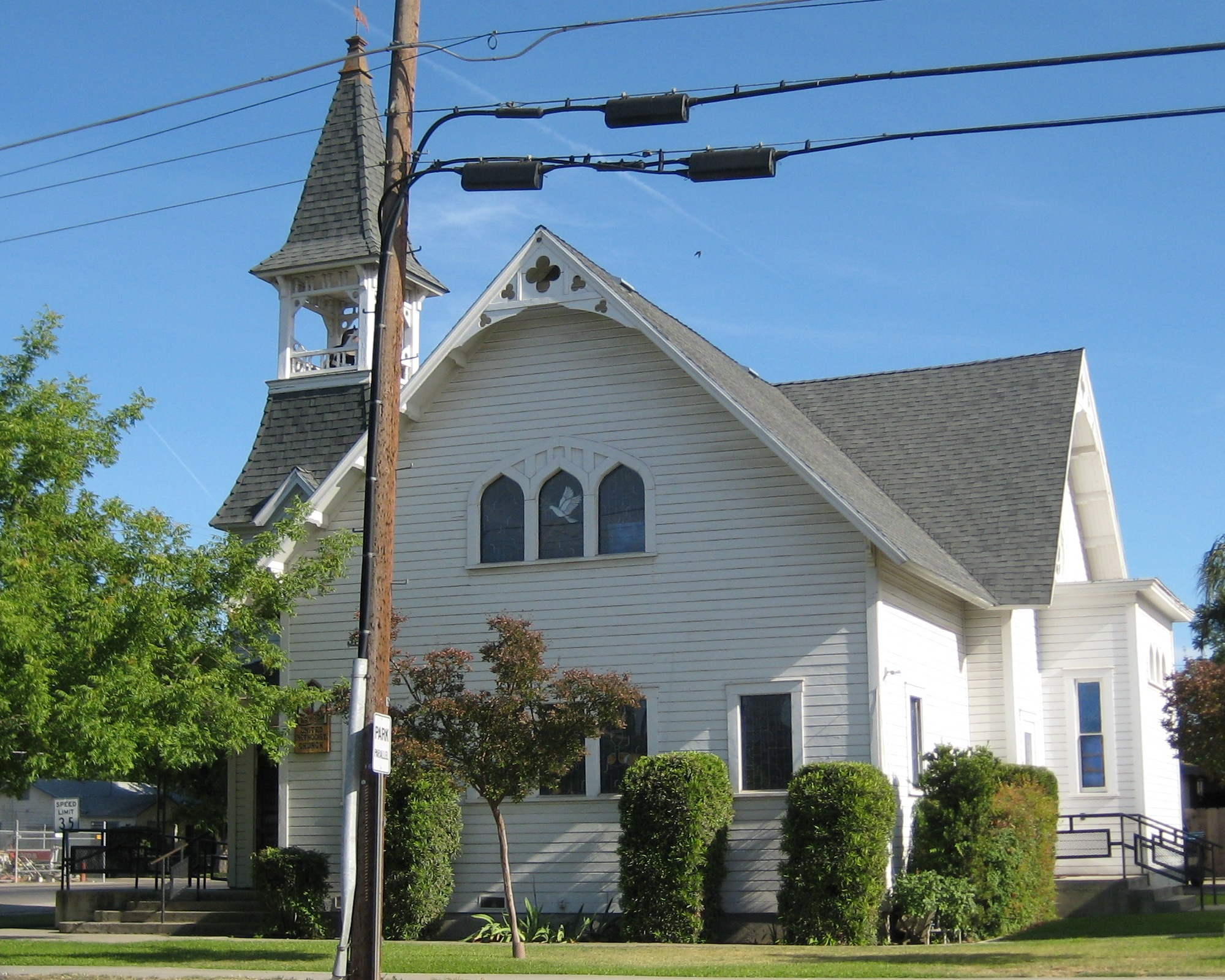
Armona United Methodist Church

The United Methodist Church was constructed in 1910.
