= Armona Union School District =

School district in California

Address
- 11115 C Street Armona, California, 93202; United States
- Coordinates: 36°18′42″N 119°42′24″W

District information
- Type: Public
- Grades: K–12
- NCES District ID: 0603180

Students and staff
- Students: 1,134 (2020–2021)
- Teachers: 54.5 (FTE)
- Staff: 57.0 (FTE)
- Student–teacher ratio: 20.81:1

Other information
- Website: www.auesd.com

Armona Union Elementary School District is a school district serving Armona, California, and outlying rural areas as well as a portion of southwest Hanford. Armona is a census-designated place with 4,274 people in the 2020 census, with 30.3% of the population under the age of 18.

== Structure ==
The district is led by Superintendent Dr. Xavier Piña and the elected School Board. The district operates four schools: Armona Elementary, Parkview Middle School, Crossroads Charter Academy, and Crossroads Trade Tech Academy.

== Schools ==
=== Armona Elementary ===
Armona Elementary School was founded in 1952 and serves the district's students from Kindergarten to Fourth Grade. It is currently headed by Principal Veronica Pelayo-Morales. The school has a faculty of approximately 30 full and part-time teachers.

=== Parkview Middle School ===
Parkview Middle School serves the district's students from Fifth Grade to Eighth Grade. It is currently headed by Principal Kathi Felder. The school has a faculty of approximately 20 full and part-time teachers. After eighth grade, students in the district attend Sierra Pacific High School or Hanford West High School for 9th through 12th Grade.

=== Crossroads Charter Academy ===
Crossroads Charter Academy was founded in 2003 and is currently headed by Principal Laurie Blue. It has a staff of two full-time teachers and 28 part-time teachers. The school is a Virtual Independent Study program serving Kindergarten through Twelfth Grade. Crossroads Trade Tech Academy is a hybrid school which means students attend daily for three hours a day and then do independent study to complete work not finished during the school day. Trade Tech has a focus on career education and currently has an emphasis on construction. As of May 2011, there are 75 students attending Trade Tech.
