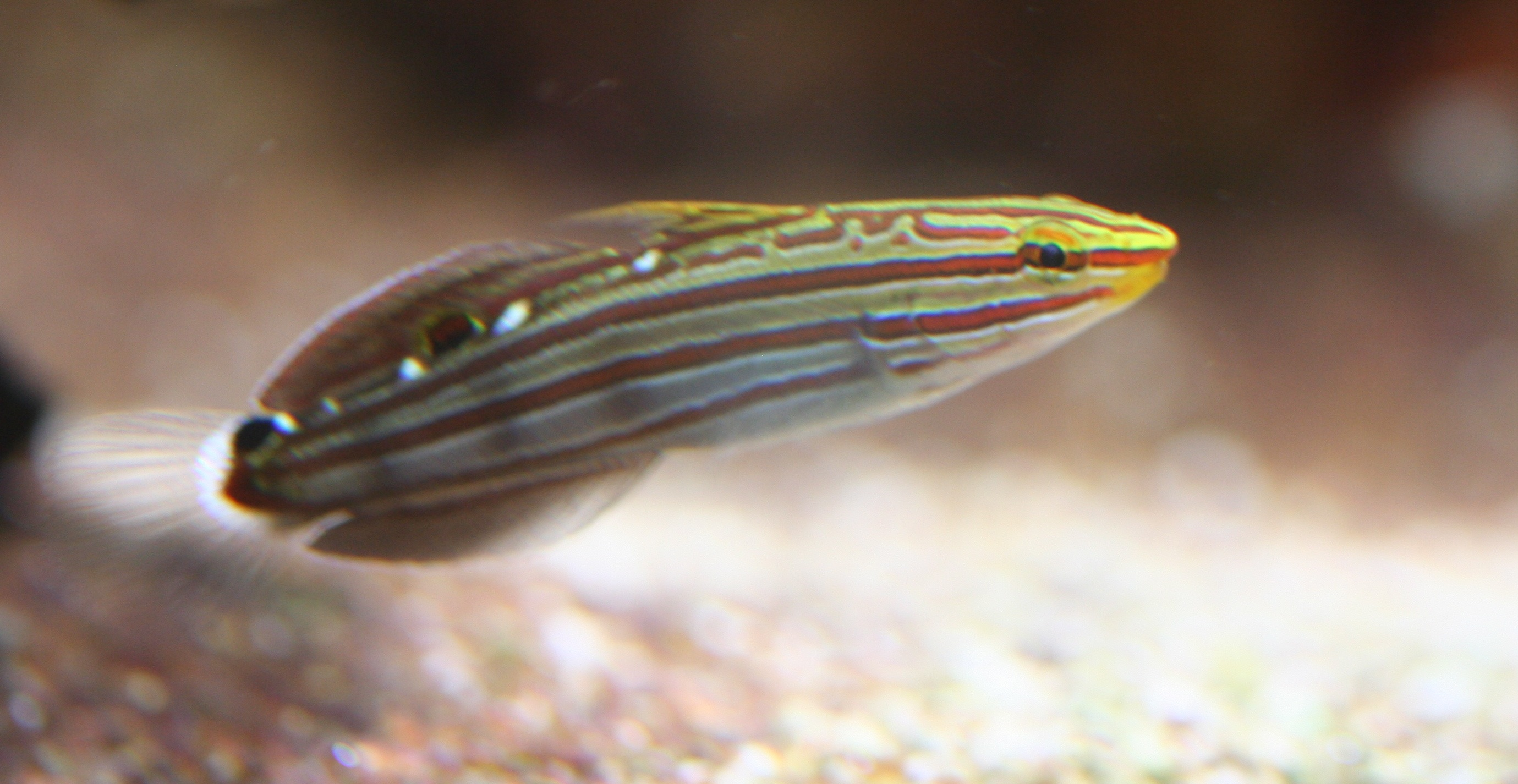

Conservation status
- Least Concern (IUCN 3.1)

Scientific classification
- Kingdom: Animalia
- Phylum: Chordata
- Class: Actinopterygii
- Order: Gobiiformes
- Family: Gobiidae
- Genus: Koumansetta
- Species: K. rainfordi

Binomial name
- Koumansetta rainfordi Whitley, 1940

Synonyms
- Amblygobius rainfordi (Whitley, 1940)

= Koumansetta rainfordi =

Species of fish

Koumansetta rainfordi, the old glory or Court Jester goby, is a species of goby native to tropical reefs of the western Pacific Ocean where it occurs at depths of from 2 to 30 metres (6.6 to 98.4 ft). This species can reach a length of 8.5 centimetres (3.3 in) SL. It can also be found in the aquarium trade. The specific name honours the viticulturalist E. H. Rainford, of the Queensland Agricultural Department, who also collected specimens for the Australian Museum, and in 1924 he collected specimens of this species.
