= 2015 Tennessee train derailment =

Railway incident in Tennessee, United States

Details
- Date: July 2, 2015; 11 years ago
- Location: Maryville, Tennessee
- Coordinates: 35.7608016°N 84.02437429999998°W
- Operator: CSX Transportation
- Incident type: Derailment
- Cause: Overheated journal (Roller bearings)

Statistics
- Trains: One
- Injured: 197
- Damage: $272,000

The 2015 Tennessee train derailment occurred on July 1, 2015 when a CSX Transportation train derailed at Maryville, Tennessee. The train was carrying toxic chemicals, leading to an evacuation of over 5,000 people.

== Accident ==
At 11:45 PM on July 1, 2015, a CSX Transportation freight train carrying hazardous materials from Cincinnati, Ohio, to Waycross, Georgia derailed in Maryville, Tennessee. It was composed of two locomotives and 57 freight cars, at least two of which were carrying acrylonitrile. Other railcars in the consist were carrying LPG. Three of the railcars were reported to have caught fire. Authorities ordered an evacuation of everyone within a 1 mile (1.6 km) radius. The evacuation zone was later extended to 2 miles (3.2 km), affecting over 5,000 people. Those evacuated were offered accommodation at the Heritage High School, where Red Cross personnel provided assistance, or at the Foothills Mall. Roads closed included U.S. Route 321. Fifty-two people were injured by inhaling fumes from the chemicals on the train. Twenty-five of them, including seven police officers, were hospitalized.

CSX said it was helping residents find lodging. They also said there were at least three cars carrying the chemical, although only one was burning.

== Investigation ==
The National Transportation Safety Board (NTSB) did not open an investigation into the accident, although that option remained open to them. At the time, NTSB spokespersons reported they would monitor the situation and could send an investigator later depending on new developments but never did.

The Federal Railroad Administration (FRA) lists a report from CSX stating that the cause of the accident was an overheated journal or roller bearing. It also states the number of injured as 197 and total damages as $272,000.
