= Lake in the Sky (Tennessee) =

- Location within Tennessee Location within the United States
- Coordinates: 35.655187°N 83.907398°W
- Primary inflows: Flat Creek
- Primary outflows: Flat Creek
- Basin countries: United States
- Max. length: 3,000 feet (910 m)
- Max. width: 500 feet (150 m)
- Surface area: 52.5 acres (21.2 ha)
- Surface elevation: 2,008 feet (612 m)

Lake in the Sky is an artificial lake in Blount County, Tennessee, formed by damming Flat Creek. It lies in the center of Top of the World, an unincorporated community.

== Location ==
Lake in the Sky is a small mountain lake located on the slopes of Chilhowee Mountain. Foothills Parkway passes just to the northwest, and the boundary of the Great Smoky Mountains National Park lies just to the southeast. The lake lies in an area called The Flats, on a spur of Chilhowee Mountain. The surrounding country is rugged. Lake in the Sky is at an elevation of 2,008 feet (612 m) above sea level. The nearest major town is Townsend, Tennessee.

== Lake ==
The lake is part of the watershed of the Little River. It is near the head of Flat Creek, a tributary of Hesse Creek. The Flat Creek dam is at the north end of the lake. The dam was built in 1966, forming the 52.5-acre (21.2 ha) lake. Flat Creek is non-navigable.

Lake in the Sky is not operated for flood control purposes, but it is one of several dams in Blount County that may provide some protection against flooding.

Specimens of the freshwater jellyfish Craspedacusta sowerbii, an exotic species that is widespread in the United States, have been found in the lake. Downstream of Lake in the Sky, Flat Creek had elevated iron concentrations in fall and summer of 2003. This is a concern since the creek is a direct tributary to a stocked trout stream.

== Settlement ==
Juan Pardo may have visited the future site of the lake during his 1567–68 expedition. He found a small reddish stone, which was examined by Andrés Suarez, a "melter of gold and silver". Suarez considered that it contained silver. (Note: The exact location where Pardo found the stone is uncertain. One source places it in the ridge and valley country to the north of today's Knoxville, Tennessee.)

The lake today is surrounded by a small community at 35.6534181°N 83.9099010°W named the Top of the World Estates. The Blount County Fire Protection District has its station #8 at 5714 Flats Road, on the east shore of the lake.
