= Blount County, Tennessee =

County in Tennessee, United States

- County
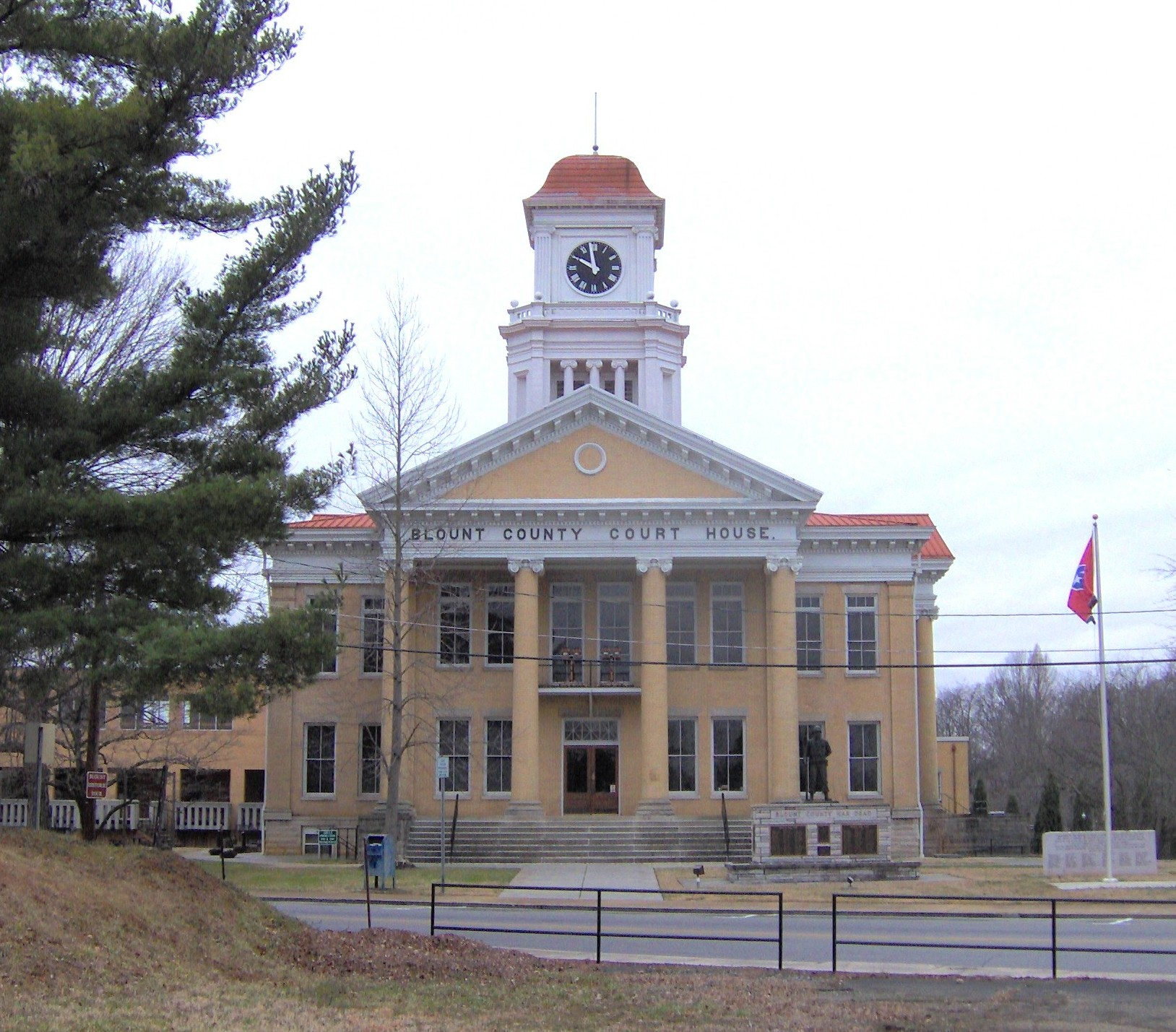
- Blount County Courthouse in Maryville

- Flag Seal

- Location within the U.S. state of Tennessee
- Coordinates: 35°41′N 83°56′W
- Country: United States
- State: Tennessee
- Founded: 1795
- Named for: William Blount
- Seat: Maryville
- Largest city: Maryville

Area
  - Total: 567 sq mi (1,470 km^{2})
  - Land: 559 sq mi (1,450 km^{2})
  - Water: 7.8 sq mi (20 km^{2}) 1.4%

Population (2020)
  - Total: 135,280
  - Estimate (2025): 143,820 ▲
  - Density: 242/sq mi (93.4/km^{2})
- Time zone: UTC−5 (Eastern)
  - Summer (DST): UTC−4 (EDT)
- Congressional district: 2nd
- Website: www.blounttn.gov

Blount County is a county located in the East Tennessee Grand Division of the U.S. state of Tennessee. As of the 2020 census, its population was 135,280. The county seat is Maryville, which is also the county's largest city. Blount County is included in the Knoxville metropolitan area.

== History ==
What is today Blount County was for many thousands of years Indian territory, passed down to the Cherokee tribe that claimed the land upon the arrival of White settlers in the late 18th century. Shortly thereafter, on July 11, 1795, Blount County became the 10th county established in Tennessee, when the Territorial Legislature voted to split adjacent Knox and Jefferson Counties. The new county was named for the governor of the Southwest Territory, William Blount, and its county seat, Maryville, was named for his wife Mary Grainger Blount. This establishment, however, did little to settle the differences between White immigrants and Cherokee natives, which was, for the most part, not accomplished until an 1819 treaty.

Like a majority of East Tennessee counties, Blount County was opposed to secession on the eve of the Civil War. In Tennessee's Ordinance of Secession referendum on June 8, 1861, Blount Countians voted against secession by a margin of 1,766 to 414. Residents of pro-Union Cades Cove and pro-Confederate Hazel Creek (on the other side of the mountains in North Carolina) regularly launched raids against one another during the war.

Throughout its history, the boundaries of Blount County have been altered numerous times, most notably in 1870, when a large swath of western Blount was split into Loudon and portions of other counties. Also, the establishment of the Great Smoky Mountains National Park in 1936, while not affecting the legal boundaries of Blount County, has significantly impacted the use of southeastern Blount County.

Blount County has been served by The Daily Times, currently published in Maryville, since 1883.

On July 2, 2015, a freight train carrying hazardous materials derailed. About 5,000 residents were displaced from their homes within a two-mile (three-kilometer) radius.

== Geography ==
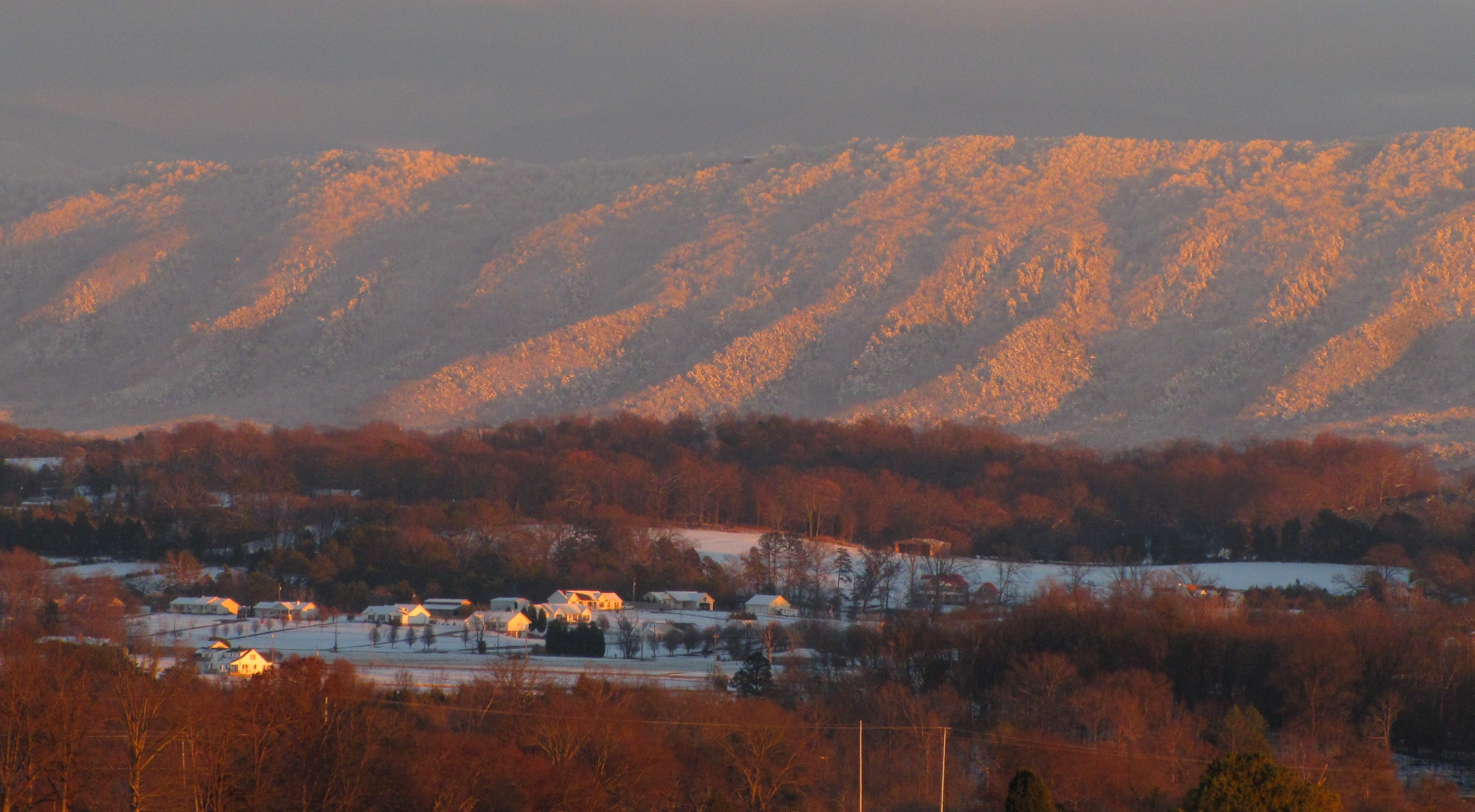
Chilhowee Mountain in winter

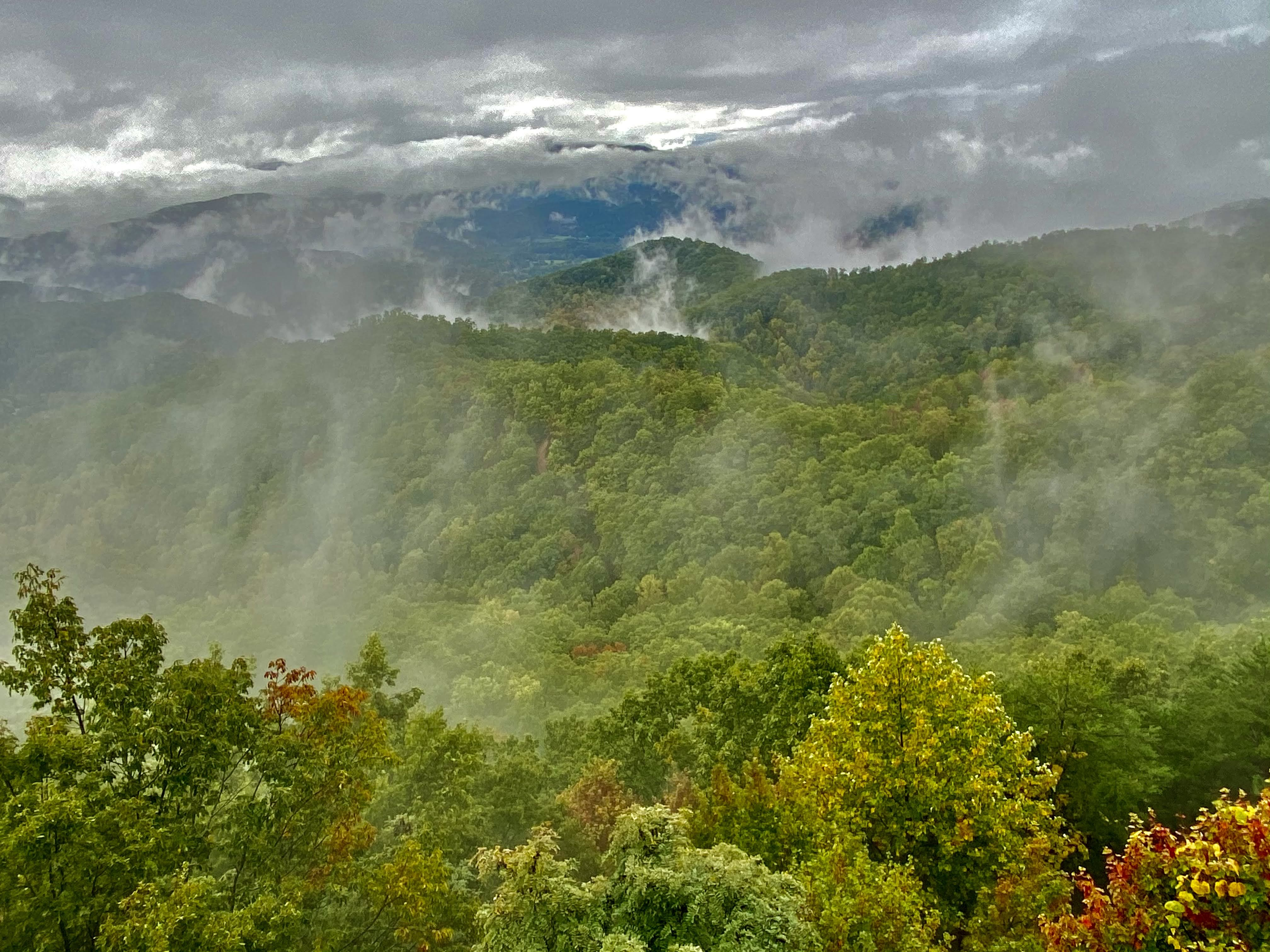
View from the "Missing Link" of the Foothills Parkway

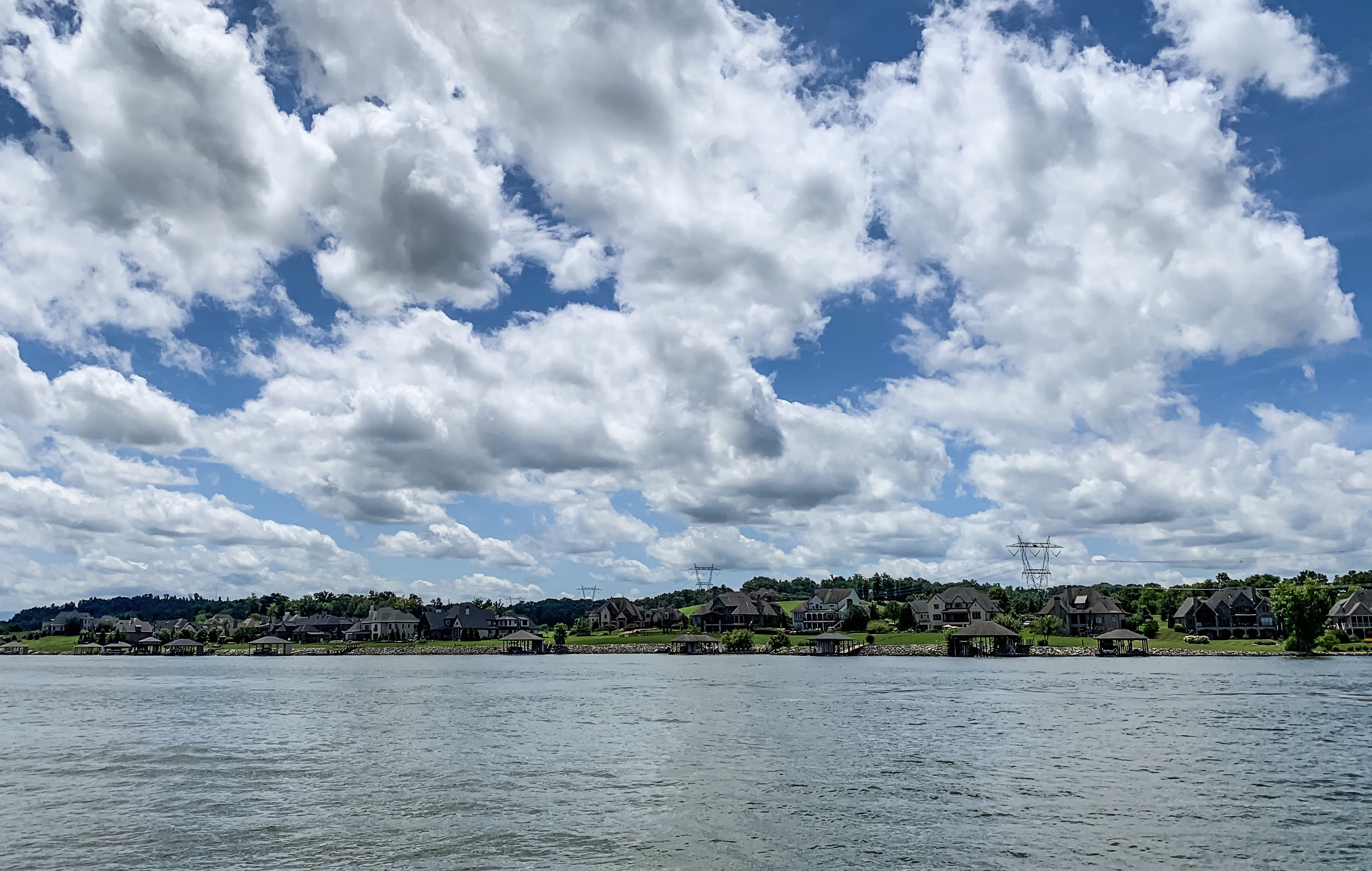
Lakefront subdivisions along the Tennessee River shoreline in Louisville

According to the U.S. Census Bureau, the county has a total area of 567 square miles (1,470 km^{2}), of which 7.8 square miles (20 km^{2}) (1.4%) are covered by water.

The southern part of Blount County is part of the Great Smoky Mountains, and is protected by the Great Smoky Mountains National Park. The crest of the range forms the county's border with Swain County, North Carolina, and includes Blount's highest point, 5,527-foot (1,685 m) Thunderhead Mountain, and the 4,949-foot (1,508 m) Gregory Bald, a prominent grassy bald. The northern part of the county is part of the Ridge-and-Valley Appalachians. The geologic boundary between the Blue Ridge (which includes the Smokies) and Ridge-and-Valley provinces runs along Chilhowee Mountain, a long and narrow ridge that stretches across the central part of the county. Much of Blount's topography is characterized by elongate ridges and rolling hills—known locally as "The Foothills"—which emanate outward from the Smokies range.

The mountainous southern portion of Blount County is dotted by relatively isolated valleys known as Appalachian coves. The best known of these valleys, Cades Cove, is one of the most visited sections of the national park, and is noted for the remnants of the Appalachian community that occupied the cove prior to the park's formation, as well as an abundance of wildlife, especially white-tailed deer. Tuckaleechee Cove is occupied by the city of Townsend, and Millers Cove is occupied by the community of Walland. This part of the county is also home to two large caves: Tuckaleechee Caverns, a popular show cave, and Bull Cave, which at 924 feet (282 m), is the deepest in Tennessee.

The Tennessee River forms part of Blount's border with Knox County to the northwest. This section of the Tennessee is part of Fort Loudoun Lake, an artificial lake created by the Tennessee Valley Authority. The Little Tennessee River, a tributary of the Tennessee, forms part of Blount's southern border with Monroe County, and includes three artificial lakes: Tellico, Chilhowee, and Calderwood (two others, Cheoah and Fontana, are located just upstream in North Carolina). Little River, another tributary of the Tennessee, flows northward from deep within the Smokies and traverses the central part of the county. The river's confluence with its Middle Prong forms a popular swimming area known as the "Townsend Wye", which is located just inside the park south of Townsend.

=== Geographical features ===
- Great Smoky Mountains
- Chilhowee Mountain
- Thunderhead Mountain
- Gregory Bald
- Lake in the Sky
- Look Rock
- Fort Loudoun Lake
- Chilhowee Lake
- Little River
- Little Tennessee River

=== Adjacent counties ===
- Knox County, Tennessee – north
- Sevier County, Tennessee – east
- Swain County, North Carolina – southeast
- Graham County, North Carolina – south
- Monroe County, Tennessee – southwest
- Loudon County, Tennessee – west

=== National protected areas ===
- Appalachian Trail (part)
- Foothills Parkway (part)
- Great Smoky Mountains National Park (part)

=== State protected areas ===
- Foothills Wildlife Management Area
- Sam Houston Schoolhouse (state historic site)
- Kyker Bottoms Refuge
- Tellico Lake Wildlife Management Area (part)
- Whites Mill Refuge

== Demographics ==
Historical population
| Census | Pop. | Note | %± |
|---|---|---|---|
| 1800 | 5,587 | | — |
| 1810 | 8,839 | | 58.2% |
| 1820 | 11,258 | | 27.4% |
| 1830 | 11,028 | | −2.0% |
| 1840 | 11,745 | | 6.5% |
| 1850 | 12,424 | | 5.8% |
| 1860 | 13,270 | | 6.8% |
| 1870 | 14,237 | | 7.3% |
| 1880 | 15,985 | | 12.3% |
| 1890 | 17,589 | | 10.0% |
| 1900 | 19,206 | | 9.2% |
| 1910 | 20,809 | | 8.3% |
| 1920 | 28,800 | | 38.4% |
| 1930 | 33,989 | | 18.0% |
| 1940 | 41,116 | | 21.0% |
| 1950 | 54,691 | | 33.0% |
| 1960 | 57,525 | | 5.2% |
| 1970 | 63,744 | | 10.8% |
| 1980 | 77,700 | | 21.9% |
| 1990 | 85,969 | | 10.6% |
| 2000 | 105,823 | | 23.1% |
| 2010 | 123,010 | | 16.2% |
| 2020 | 135,280 | | 10.0% |
| 2025 (est.) | 143,820 | ▲ | 6.3% |
U.S. Decennial Census; 1790–1960 1900–1990; 1990–2000; 2010–2020 2020–2030

=== Racial and ethnic composition ===
Blount County, Tennessee – Racial and ethnic composition Note: the US Census treats Hispanic/Latino as an ethnic category. This table excludes Latinos from the racial categories and assigns them to a separate category. Hispanics/Latinos may be of any race.
| Race / Ethnicity (NH = Non-Hispanic) | Pop 1980 | Pop 1990 | Pop 2000 | Pop 2010 | Pop 2020 | % 1980 | % 1990 | % 2000 | % 2010 | % 2020 |
|---|---|---|---|---|---|---|---|---|---|---|
| White alone (NH) | 74,490 | 82,207 | 99,596 | 113,240 | 117,952 | 95.78% | 95.62% | 94.12% | 92.06% | 87.19% |
| Black or African American alone (NH) | 2,566 | 2,780 | 3,052 | 3,314 | 3,552 | 3.30% | 3.23% | 2.88% | 2.69% | 2.63% |
| Native American or Alaska Native alone (NH) | 104 | 190 | 282 | 365 | 339 | 0.13% | 0.22% | 0.27% | 0.30% | 0.25% |
| Asian alone (NH) | 135 | 405 | 759 | 863 | 1,280 | 0.17% | 0.47% | 0.72% | 0.70% | 0.95% |
| Native Hawaiian or Pacific Islander alone (NH) | x | x | 26 | 25 | 23 | x | x | 0.02% | 0.02% | 0.02% |
| Other race alone (NH) | 54 | 19 | 54 | 109 | 439 | 0.07% | 0.02% | 0.05% | 0.09% | 0.32% |
| Mixed race or Multiracial (NH) | x | x | 934 | 1,653 | 5,986 | x | x | 0.88% | 1.34% | 4.42% |
| Hispanic or Latino (any race) | 421 | 368 | 1,120 | 3,441 | 5,709 | 0.54% | 0.43% | 1.06% | 2.80% | 4.22% |
| Total | 77,770 | 85,969 | 105,823 | 123,010 | 135,280 | 100.00% | 100.00% | 100.00% | 100.00% | 100.00% |

=== 2020 census ===
As of the 2020 census, 135,280 people, 54,720 households, and 35,299 families were residing in the county.

The racial makeup of the county is detailed in the table above, with non-Hispanic White residents forming the majority and smaller Black, Native American, Asian, Pacific Islander, and other or multiracial populations; Hispanic or Latino residents of any race comprised 4.22% of the population.

The median age was 43.9 years, with 20.4% of residents under the age of 18 and 21.1% aged 65 or older. For every 100 females there were 95.2 males, and for every 100 females age 18 and over there were 92.7 males.

62.8% of residents lived in urban areas, while 37.2% lived in rural areas.

There were 54,720 households in the county, of which 27.8% had children under the age of 18 living in them. Of all households, 52.7% were married-couple households, 16.2% were households with a male householder and no spouse or partner present, and 25.0% were households with a female householder and no spouse or partner present. About 26.1% of all households were made up of individuals and 12.3% had someone living alone who was 65 years of age or older.

There were 59,776 housing units, of which 8.5% were vacant. Among occupied housing units, 73.4% were owner-occupied and 26.6% were renter-occupied. The homeowner vacancy rate was 1.3% and the rental vacancy rate was 5.8%.

=== 2000 census ===
As of the census of 2000, 105,823 people, 42,667 households, and 30,634 families were residing in the county. The population density was 190 people per square mile (73 people/km^{2}). The 47,059 housing units had an average density of 84 per square mile (32/km^{2}). The racial makeup of the county was 94.73% White, 2.91% Black, 0.29% Native American, 0.72% Asian, 0.37% from other races, and 0.99% from two or more races. About 1.06% of the population were Hispanics or Latinos of any race.

Of the 42,667 households, 30.5% had children under 18 living with them, 58.4% were married couples living together, 10.0% had a female householder with no husband present, 28.2% were not families, and 1,384 were unmarried partner households: 1,147 heterosexual, 107 same-sex male, 130 same-sex female. About 24.4% of all households were made up of individuals, and 9.5% had someone living alone who was 65 or older. The average household size was 2.43, and the average family size was 2.88.

In the county, the age distribution was 22.8% under 18, 8.30% from 18 to 24, 29.40% from 25 to 44, 25.40% from 45 to 64, and 14.10% who were 65 or older. The median age was 38 years. For every 100 females, there were 93.80 males. For every 100 females 18 and over, there were 90.80 males. As verified by 2000 U.S. Census, for every 100 females under 65, there were 98.7 males, for every 100 females under 55 there were 99.5 males, and for every 100 females under 20 there were 105 males.

The median income for a household in the county was $37,862, and for a family was $45,038. Males had a median income of $31,877 versus $23,007 for females. The per capita income for the county was $19,416. About 7.3% of families and 9.7% of the population were below the poverty line, including 12.3% of those under age 18 and 9.1% of those 65 or over.

== Government ==
United States presidential election results for Blount County, Tennessee
| Year | Republican | | Democratic | | Third party(ies) | |
| Year | No. | % | No. | % | No. | % |
|---|---|---|---|---|---|---|
| 1880 | 1,597 | 64.42% | 882 | 35.58% | 0 | 0.00% |
| 1884 | 1,823 | 67.32% | 849 | 31.35% | 36 | 1.33% |
| 1888 | 2,237 | 67.73% | 1,009 | 30.55% | 57 | 1.73% |
| 1892 | 1,933 | 66.77% | 821 | 28.36% | 141 | 4.87% |
| 1896 | 2,652 | 72.20% | 970 | 26.41% | 51 | 1.39% |
| 1900 | 2,201 | 71.35% | 825 | 26.74% | 59 | 1.91% |
| 1904 | 1,987 | 75.52% | 618 | 23.49% | 26 | 0.99% |
| 1908 | 2,568 | 74.80% | 847 | 24.67% | 18 | 0.52% |
| 1912 | 870 | 27.92% | 836 | 26.83% | 1,410 | 45.25% |
| 1916 | 2,462 | 70.42% | 1,015 | 29.03% | 19 | 0.54% |
| 1920 | 5,540 | 78.09% | 1,550 | 21.85% | 4 | 0.06% |
| 1924 | 2,754 | 72.93% | 968 | 25.64% | 54 | 1.43% |
| 1928 | 4,125 | 85.16% | 712 | 14.70% | 7 | 0.14% |
| 1932 | 3,275 | 67.29% | 1,515 | 31.13% | 77 | 1.58% |
| 1936 | 4,119 | 57.22% | 3,056 | 42.45% | 24 | 0.33% |
| 1940 | 4,312 | 55.85% | 3,363 | 43.56% | 45 | 0.58% |
| 1944 | 6,193 | 68.30% | 2,836 | 31.28% | 38 | 0.42% |
| 1948 | 6,152 | 64.47% | 3,141 | 32.91% | 250 | 2.62% |
| 1952 | 11,708 | 69.22% | 5,163 | 30.53% | 42 | 0.25% |
| 1956 | 12,667 | 70.90% | 5,076 | 28.41% | 124 | 0.69% |
| 1960 | 13,552 | 68.20% | 6,213 | 31.27% | 107 | 0.54% |
| 1964 | 11,876 | 58.40% | 8,459 | 41.60% | 0 | 0.00% |
| 1968 | 12,753 | 57.10% | 5,176 | 23.17% | 4,407 | 19.73% |
| 1972 | 16,078 | 73.85% | 5,303 | 24.36% | 390 | 1.79% |
| 1976 | 13,851 | 52.79% | 12,096 | 46.10% | 293 | 1.12% |
| 1980 | 17,959 | 63.81% | 9,412 | 33.44% | 773 | 2.75% |
| 1984 | 20,525 | 68.74% | 9,188 | 30.77% | 146 | 0.49% |
| 1988 | 20,027 | 67.26% | 9,602 | 32.25% | 147 | 0.49% |
| 1992 | 18,415 | 48.91% | 14,655 | 38.92% | 4,581 | 12.17% |
| 1996 | 19,310 | 52.29% | 14,687 | 39.77% | 2,933 | 7.94% |
| 2000 | 25,273 | 62.15% | 14,688 | 36.12% | 701 | 1.72% |
| 2004 | 33,241 | 68.24% | 15,047 | 30.89% | 424 | 0.87% |
| 2008 | 35,571 | 68.88% | 15,253 | 29.53% | 821 | 1.59% |
| 2012 | 35,441 | 71.98% | 12,934 | 26.27% | 859 | 1.74% |
| 2016 | 37,443 | 71.72% | 12,100 | 23.18% | 2,665 | 5.10% |
| 2020 | 47,369 | 71.12% | 17,932 | 26.92% | 1,308 | 1.96% |
| 2024 | 50,699 | 73.24% | 17,664 | 25.52% | 861 | 1.24% |

Like most of East Tennessee, Blount County has been a Republican bastion for decades. The last non-Republican to carry the county was Theodore Roosevelt, during his third-party run in 1912. In 1976, Jimmy Carter took 46% of the vote. In 1992, George H. W. Bush was held to 48.9% of the vote—the only time in over a century that a Republican has failed to win a majority in Blount County. No Democrat since Andrew Jackson in 1832 has won Blount County at the presidential level.

The current elected members of the Blount County government are:

- Commissioners:

Blount County government
| County executive | Ed Mitchell |
| Assessor of property | Todd Orr |
| Clerk and master | Stephen Ogle |
| County clerk | Gaye Hasty |
| Clerk of courts | Chris Cantrell |
| County treasurer | |
| District attorney | Ryan Desmond |
| Registrar of deeds | Phyllis Crisp |
| Chief highway officer | Jeff Headrick |
| Registrar of probate | |
| County sheriff | James Berrong |
| Trustee | Scott Graves |
State government
| State representative(s) | 2 Representatives: Jerome Moon (R-Tennessee District 8), Tom Stinnett (R-Tennessee District 20) |
| State senator(s) | 1 Senators: Tom Hatcher (politician) (R-Tennessee District 8) |
Federal government
| U.S. representative(s) | Tim Burchett (R-2nd District) |
| U.S. senators | Bill Hagerty (R); Marsha Blackburn (R) |

== Economy ==
Most of the early European-American settlers were of little means; they were subsistence farmers throughout the early years of the county's establishment. The first industry to make its mark on Blount County, as in other neighboring counties, was that of lumber.

It was the massive development of this industry in the mountains of east Blount that, in part, led to the creation of the Great Smoky Mountains National Park. It includes the southeastern portion of the county. Today, manufacturing has replaced lumber in importance, with over 100 manufacturing plants located in the county.

Denso Manufacturing Tennessee Inc., a division of Denso Global, is the county's largest employer, with about 3,000 employees.

== Education ==
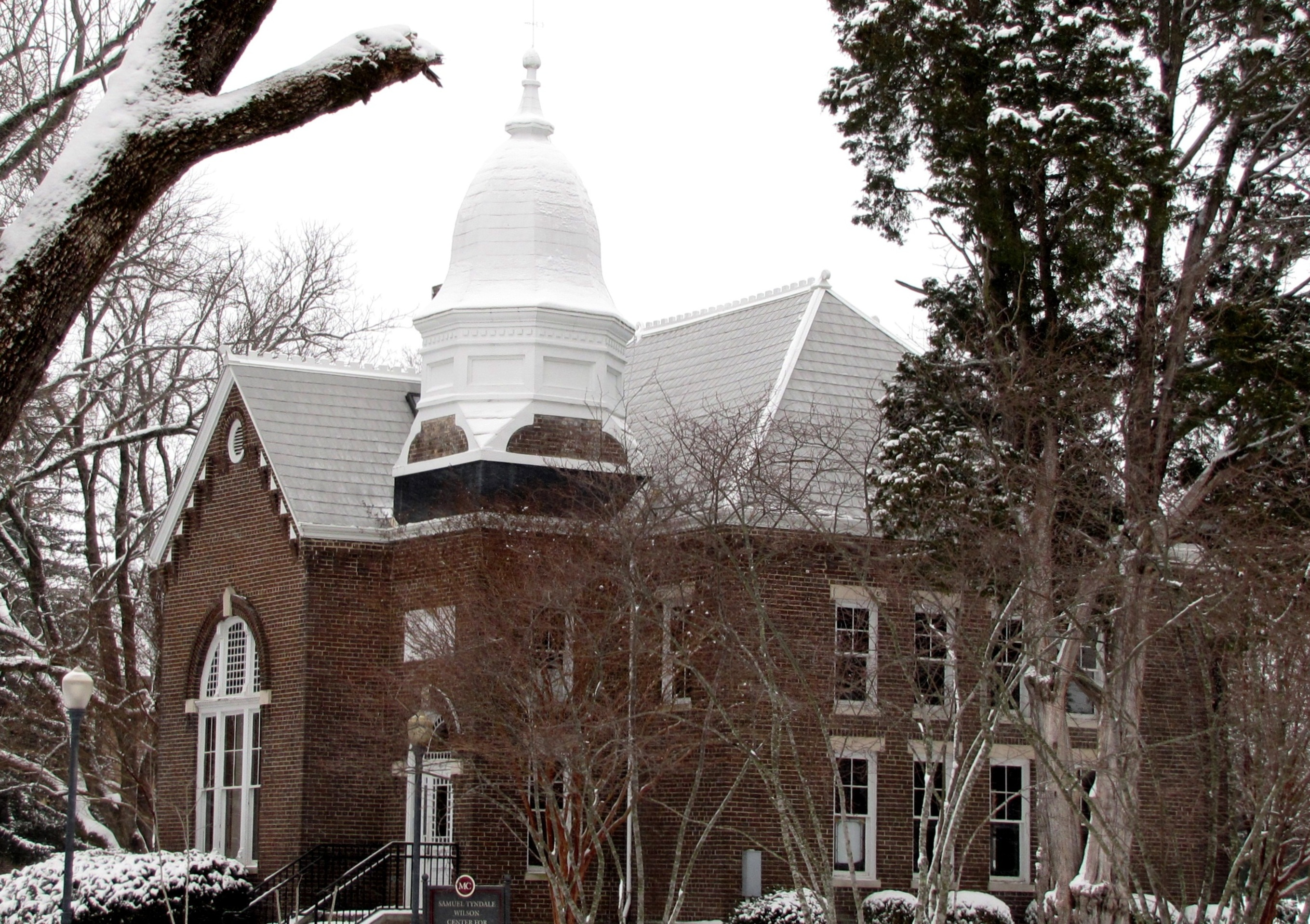
Wilson Center at Maryville College

Public schools in Blount County are part of the Blount County Schools system, with the exception of schools in the cities of Maryville and Alcoa, both of which operate separate, independent school systems. Private schools located in the county include Maryville Christian School and Clayton-Bradley STEM school.

Blount County is home to two postsecondary educational institutions: Maryville College, a Presbyterian-related, liberal-arts college, founded in 1819 in downtown Maryville, and a satellite campus of Knoxville-based Pellissippi State Community College, referred to as Pellissippi State Community College, or PSCC, Blount County Campus.

== Transportation ==
=== Paratransit ===
Blount County is served by the East Tennessee Human Resource Agency's Public Transit system. ETHRA operates in about 16 counties in eastern Tennessee, and is headquartered in the nearby city of Loudon. The service offers residents of any of the counties covered by ETHRA door-to-door pickup transportation across its service area by request only. ETHRA provides a large variety of services in Blount County and other parts of East Tennessee.

=== Airports ===
- TYS – McGhee Tyson Airport

=== Highways ===
- Interstate highways
  - Interstate 140 (Pellissippi Parkway)
- U.S. highways
  - US Route 129 (Airport Hwy, Alcoa Hwy, Hwy 411 South and Calderwood Hwy)
  - US Route 321 (Lamar Alexander Pkwy and Wears Valley Road)
  - US Route 411 (Broadway Ave and Sevierville Road)
  - US Route 441 (Chapman Highway)
- State highways
  - Tennessee State Route 33 (Old Knoxville Hwy, Broadway Ave and Hwy 411 South)
  - Tennessee State Route 35 (Sevierville Road, Washington Street and North Hall Road)
  - Tennessee State Route 72
  - Tennessee State Route 73 (Lamar Alexander Pkwy & Wears Valley Road)
  - Tennessee State Route 115 (Airport Hwy, Alcoa Hwy, Hwy 411 South and Calderwood Hwy)
  - Tennessee State Route 162 (Pellissippi Parkway)
- Secondary Routes
  - Tennessee State Route 71 (Chapman Highway)
  - Tennessee State Route 73 Scenic (Lamar Alexander Pkwy and Little River Road)
  - Tennessee State Route 333 (Topside Road, Louisville Road, Quarry Rd and Miser Station Road)
  - Tennessee State Route 334 (Louisville Road)
  - Tennessee State Route 335 (William Blount Drive, Hunt Road and Old Glory Road)
  - Tennessee State Route 336 (Montvale Road, Six Mile Road and Brick Mill Road)
  - Tennessee State Route 429 (Airbase Road)
  - Tennessee State Route 446 (Foothills Mall Drive)
  - Tennessee State Route 447
- US Park Service Roads
  - Foothills Parkway
  - Little River Road
  - Laurel Creek Road
  - Cades Cove Loop Road

== Parks ==
In addition to the federally operated Great Smoky Mountains National Park, which draws many visitors to the county each year, Blount County operates numerous smaller community parks and recreation centers, primarily in the cities of Alcoa and Maryville. Some of these facilities include:

- Amerine Park (Maryville)
- Bassell Courts (Alcoa)
- Bicentennial Greenbelt Park (Maryville)
- Eagleton Park (Maryville)
- Everett Athletic Complex (Maryville)
- Everett Park/Everett Senior Center (Maryville)
- Howe Street Park (Alcoa)
- Martin Luther King Jr. Community Center (Alcoa)
- Louisville Point Park (Louisville)
- Oldfield Mini Park (Alcoa)
- Pearson Springs Park (Maryville)
- Pole Climbers Athletic Fields (Alcoa)
- Rock Garden Park (Alcoa)
- Sandy Springs Park (Maryville)
- John Sevier Park/Pool (Maryville)
- Springbrook Park/Pool (Alcoa)
- Richard Williams Park (Alcoa)

An integral part of keeping the parks and other parts of Blount County beautiful is the organization called Keep Blount Beautiful. This organization works in coordination with other companies including The City of Alcoa Residential Recycling Pick Up Service and Blount County HGS Trash and Recycling Same Day Residential Pick Up Service, as well as many other recycling resources in Blount County, to work towards the community goals of reducing air, water, and land pollution in order to reduce particulate matter and smog, and to improve the overall health of local parks and preserved ecosystems in Blount County, as well as surrounding areas, of East Tennessee. These organizations and companies are appreciated by thousands of East Tennesseans due to their honorable work in the Blount County community.

== Communities ==
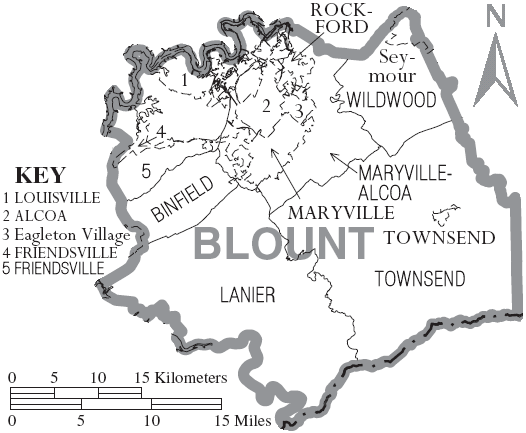
Map of Blount County, Tennessee showing cities, CDPs, and census county divisions.

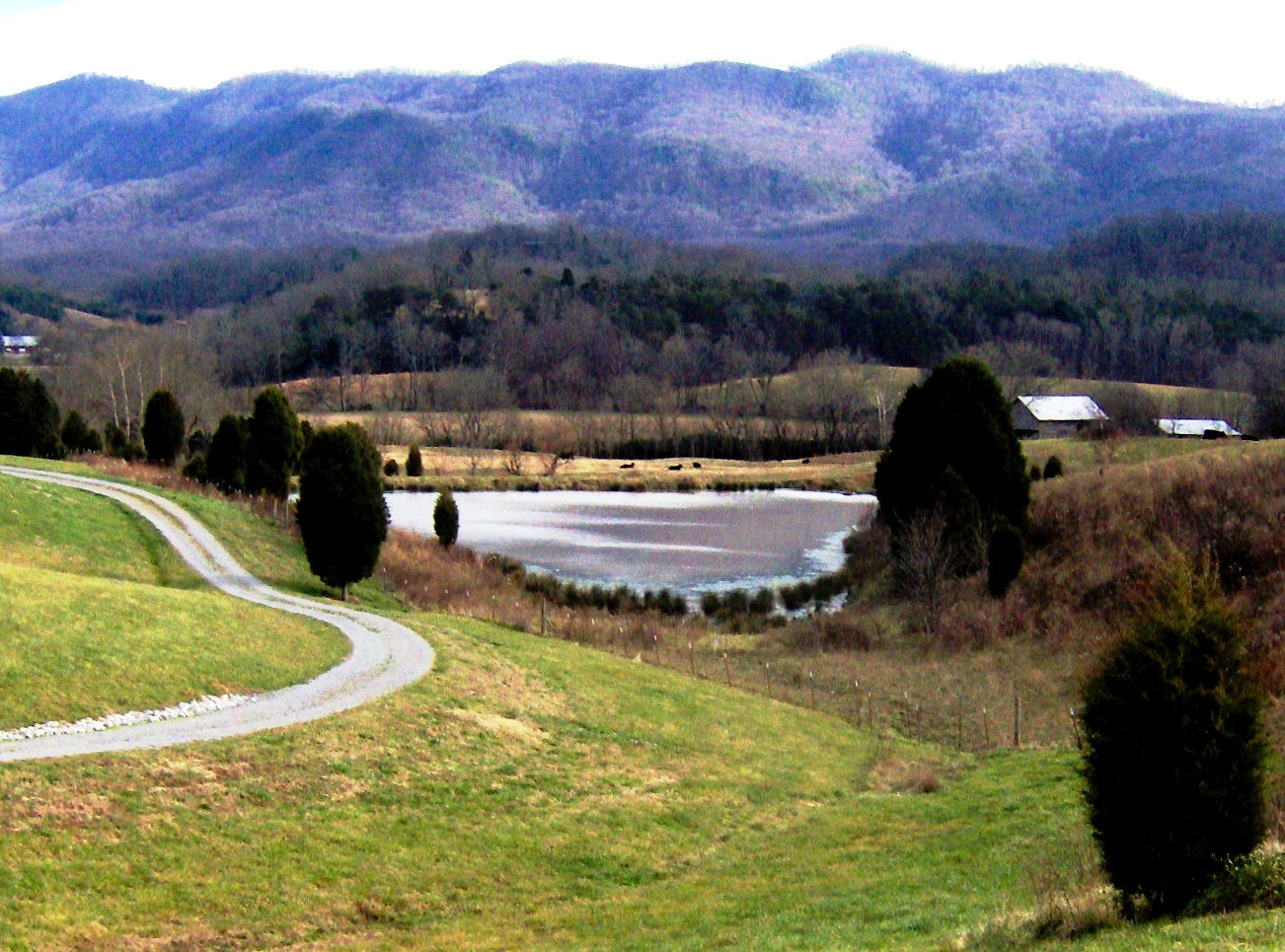
Wildwood area

=== Cities ===
- Alcoa
- Friendsville
- Maryville (county seat)
- Rockford
- Townsend

=== Towns ===
- Louisville
- Vonore (partial)

=== Census-designated places ===
- Eagleton Village
- Seymour (partial)
- Walland
- Wildwood

=== Unincorporated communities ===
- Armona
- Disco
- Fairfield
- Happy Valley
- Old Glory
- Tallassee
- Top of the World

=== Former communities ===
- Cades Cove
- Calderwood
- Tremont

== See also ==
- Great Smoky Mountains Heritage Center
- National Register of Historic Places listings in Blount County, Tennessee
- Blount County Rescue Squad
