= Old Glory =

Nickname for the flag of the United States

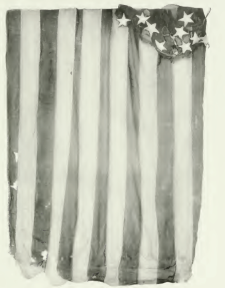
The original "Old Glory" owned by sea captain William Driver

Old Glory is a nickname for the flag of the United States. The original "Old Glory" was a flag owned by the 19th-century American sea captain William Driver (March 17, 1803 – March 3, 1886). He flew the flag during his career at sea and later brought it to Nashville, Tennessee, where he settled. Driver greatly prized the flag and ensured its safety from the Confederates, who attempted to seize the flag during the American Civil War. In 1922, Driver's daughter and niece claimed to own the original "Old Glory", which became part of the collection of the Smithsonian Institution, which remains at the National Museum of American History.

== History of the original "Old Glory" ==
The Grave marker of sea captain William Driver, who coined the "Old Glory" nickname in reference to his own oceangoing flag.

The 24-star variant of the flag, which was the national flag at the time of Driver's voyage and the first US flag to be called 'Old Glory', a term Driver coined in 1831.

The flag in 1860 after it was sewn with ten more stars including an anchor.

Captain William Driver was born on March 17, 1803, in Salem, Massachusetts. At age 13, Driver ran away from home to become a cabin boy on a ship.

At 21, Driver qualified as a master mariner and assumed command of his own ship, the Charles Doggett. In celebration of his appointment, Driver's mother and other women sewed the flag and gave it to him as a gift in 1824. It was believed that while leaving the harbor, the Captain unfurled his new flag, calling out "Behold Old Glory." With this flag flying over his ship, Driver went on to have a colorful career as a U.S. merchant seaman, sailing to China, India, Gibraltar, and the South Pacific. He participated in the tortoiseshell trade and knew some Fijian. In 1831, while voyaging in the South Pacific, Driver's ship "was the sole surviving vessel of six that departed Salem the same day." In Tahiti, where they withdrew because of illness, Driver picked up the 65 descendants of the mutineers of HMS Bounty and brought them back to Pitcairn Island (a noteworthy act that helped publicize Driver's nickname for the flag). Driver was convinced that God saved his ship to rescue the islanders.

Driver was deeply attached to the flag, writing: "It has ever been my staunch companion and protection. Savages and heathens, lowly and oppressed, hailed and welcomed it at the far end of the wide world. Then, why should it not be called Old Glory?"

Driver retired from seafaring in 1837 after his wife Martha Silsbee Babbage died from throat cancer. Driver was 34-years-old and had three young children. He settled in Nashville, Tennessee, where his three brothers operated a store. Driver remarried the next year to Sarah Jane Parks, a Southerner with whom he had several more children. Driver took his flag to Nashville, flying it on holidays, rain or shine. The flag was so large that he attached it to a rope from his attic window and stretched it on a pulley across the street to secure it to a locust tree. Driver worked as a salesman and served as vestryman of Christ Episcopal Church.

In 1860, Driver, his wife, and daughters repaired the flag, sewing on ten additional stars. Driver added by appliqué a small white anchor in the lower right corner to symbolize his maritime career. By that time, the secession crisis had begun, and Driver's family was split. While Driver was a staunch Unionist, two of his sons were fervent Confederates who enlisted in local regiments. One of Driver's sons died from wounds suffered at Perryville. In March 1862, Driver wrote: "Two sons in the army of the South! My entire house estranged . . . and when I come home . . . no one to soothe me."

Soon after Tennessee seceded from the Union, Governor Isham G. Harris sent men to Driver's home to demand the flag. Driver, 58 years old, turned the men away at his door after demanding they produce a search warrant. An armed group returned to Driver's front porch, who refused to produce the flag, saying "If you want my flag you'll have to take it over my dead body."

To save the flag from further threats, Driver and some of his Unionist neighbors secretly sewed it into a coverlet. The flag was thus hidden until February 1862, when Nashville fell to Union forces. When the Union Army, led by the 6th Ohio Infantry, entered the city, Driver went to Tennessee State Capitol after seeing the U.S. flag, and the 6th Ohio's regimental colors raised on the Capitol flagstaff and asked to see the general in command.

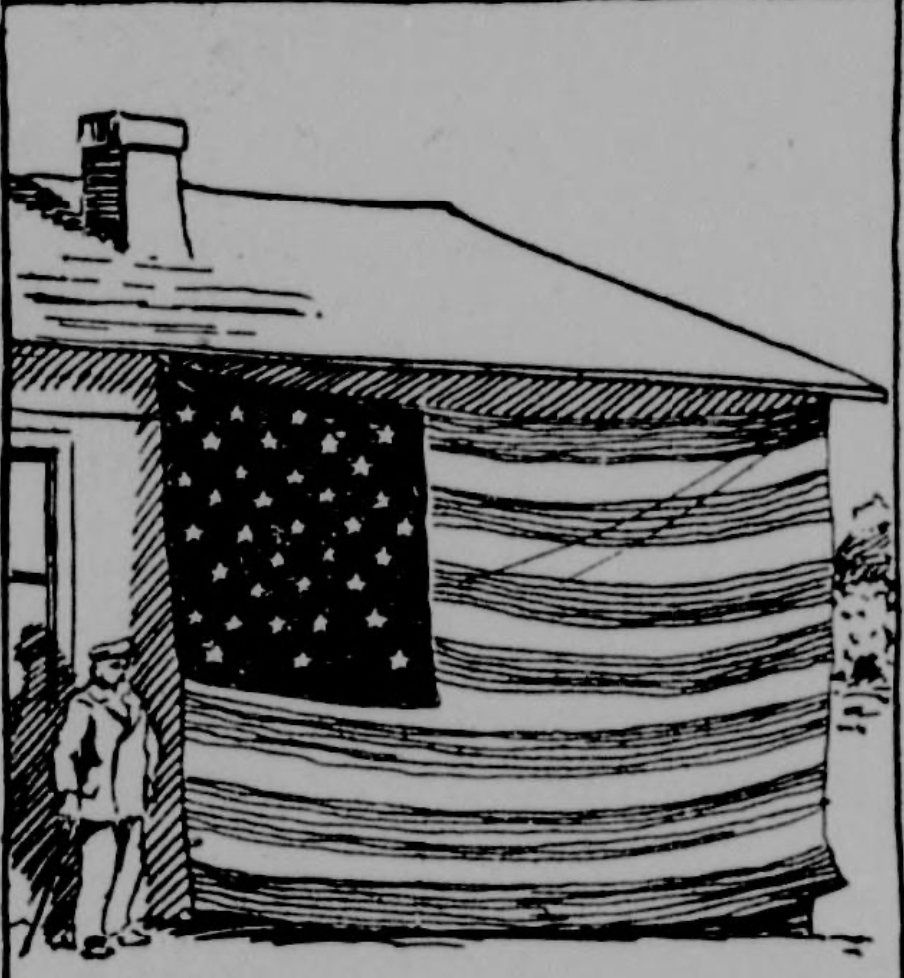
Driver next to his flag

Horace Fisher, the aide-de-camp to the Union commander in the city, Brigadier General William "Bull" Nelson, described Driver as "a stout, middle-aged man, with hair well shot with gray, short in stature, broad in shoulder, and with a roll in his gait." Introducing himself as a sea captain and Unionist, Driver had brought the coverlet with him and with a pocket knife ripped open the seams, revealing the flag. Nelson accepted the flag and ordered it run up on the Capitol flagstaff. The 6th Ohio later adopted the motto "Old Glory."

That night, a violent storm threatened to tear the flag, so Driver replaced it with a newer flag, taking the original Old Glory for safekeeping. The flag remained in his home until December 1864, when the Battle of Nashville was fought. As Confederate troopers under the command of John Bell Hood sought to retake the city, Driver hung the flag out of the third-story window and left to join the city's defense. For the rest of the American Civil War, Driver served as provost marshal of Nashville, serving in hospitals.

Mary Jane Roland, Driver's daughter, said Driver gave her the flag as a gift on July 10, 1873, telling her, "This is my old ship flag Old Glory. I love it as a mother loves her child. Take it and cherish it as I have always cherished it; for it has been my steadfast friend and protector in all parts of the world—savage, heathen and civilized."

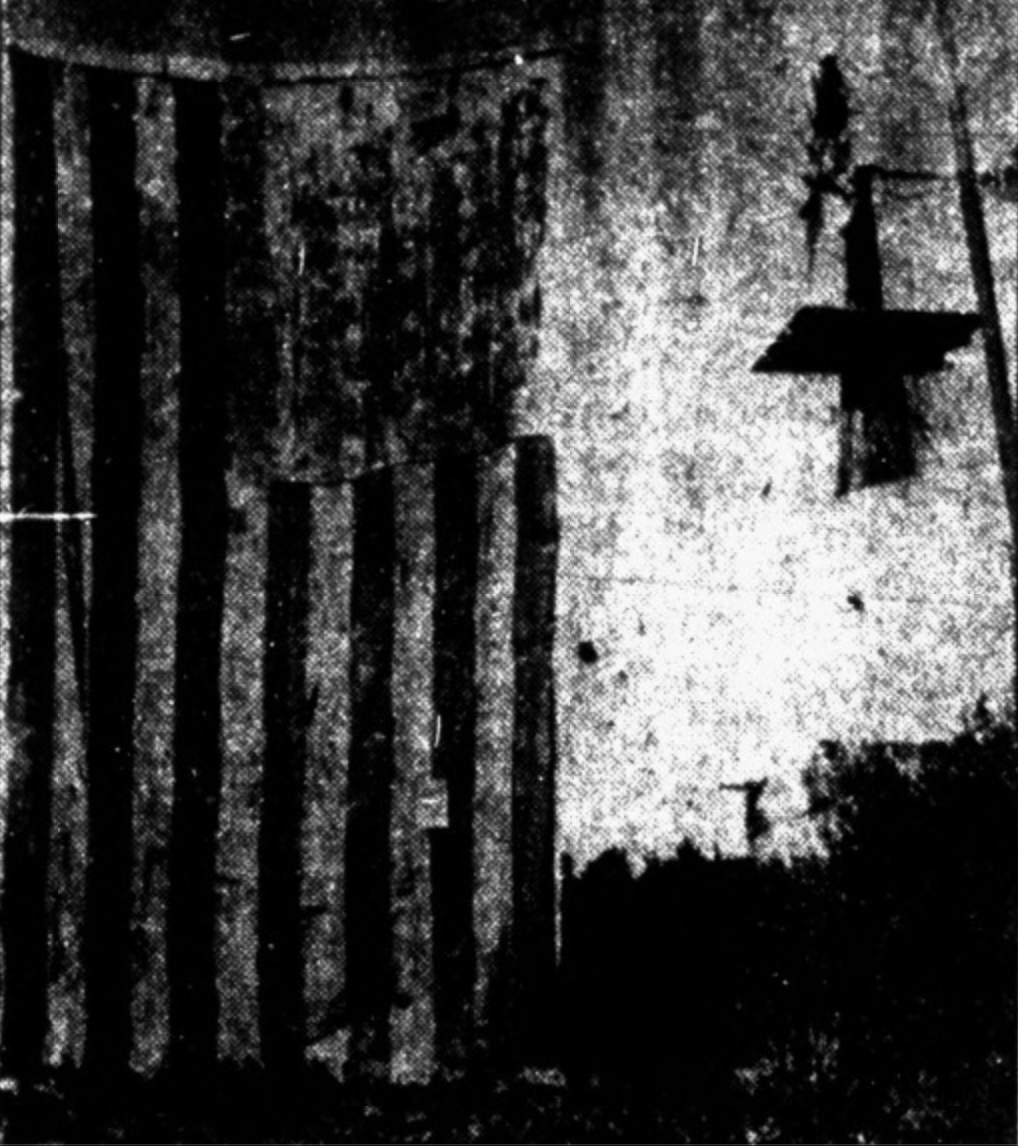
The flag in 1919

Driver died on March 3, 1886, and was buried in the Nashville City Cemetery, where, at Driver's request, his rescue of the Bounty descendants is noted on his grave stone.

Following Driver's death, a family feud erupted over the ownership of the flag. Driver's niece, Harriet Ruth Waters Cooke, the daughter of Driver's youngest sister, said she inherited the flag and presented her version of Old Glory to the Essex Institute in Salem, which became the Peabody Essex Museum, along with family memorabilia that included a letter from the Pitcairn Islands to Driver. Cooke published a family memoir in 1889, omitting any mention of Mary Jane Roland.

Roland wrote an account of the flag, publishing Old Glory, The True Story in 1918. In that memoir, Roland disputed Cooke's narrative. She presented evidence for her claim that the flag she owned was the true Old Glory. In 1922, Roland gave her Old Glory to President Warren G. Harding. Harding had the flag sent to the Smithsonian Institution. The same year, the Peabody Essex Museum sent its Old Glory to the Smithsonian.

In 2019, Captain Driver's great-great-grandson, Jack Benz, published a novel depicting the life and adventures of Captain William Driver using information collected from personal research and inherited from Captain Driver's descendants.

== Smithsonian Institution collection ==
The Smithsonian Institution has regarded the Roland flag as the authentic Old Glory, since "documentary evidence in the Tennessee State Library and Archives suggests it was the one hidden in the quilt and presented to Union troops who took Nashville. The Roland flag is 17×10 feet. The Peabody flag is 12×6 feet.

In June 2006, the Smithsonian's National Museum of American History (NMAH) loaned the Roland flag to the Tennessee State Museum in Nashville for an eight-month exhibit entitled "Old Glory: An American Treasure Comes Home". The flag was in fragile condition and had to be carefully shipped and displayed.

A conservation evaluation of both flags by NMAH curator Jennifer Locke Jones and Thomassen-Krauss began in 2012. Preliminary findings indicate that the larger Roland flag has the stronger claim to being the original Old Glory but that the Peabody flag dated to the same era and is a legitimate Driver family heirloom and Civil War–era relic. The Roland Old Glory is heavily worn on the fly edges, consistent with the wear of a seagoing flag.

The Peabody Essex Museum has in its collection fragmentary scraps from what was claimed to be Old Glory.

== See also ==
- History of the flags of the United States
- Flag of the United States
