= List of NFL players (G) =

This is a list of players who have appeared in at least one regular season or postseason game in the National Football League (NFL), American Football League (AFL), or All-America Football Conference (AAFC) and have a last name that starts with "G". This list is accurate through the end of the 2025 NFL season.

== Gab–Gar ==
- Steve Gabbard
- Blaine Gabbert
- John Gabler
- Dillon Gabriel
- Doug Gabriel
- Roman Gabriel
- Taylor Gabriel
- Andrew Gachkar
- Dennis Gadbois
- Bob Gaddis
- Christian Gaddis
- Samkon Gado
- Oronde Gadsden
- Oronde Gadsden II
- Mike Gaechter
- Derrick Gaffney
- Jabar Gaffney
- Jeff Gaffney
- Jim Gaffney
- Monk Gafford
- Rico Gafford
- Thomas Gafford
- Bobby Gage
- Justin Gage
- Russell Gage
- Steve Gage
- Bob Gagliano
- Larry Gagner
- Dave Gagnon
- Roy Gagnon
- Lamont Gaillard
- Bob Gain
- Amari Gainer
- Derrick Gainer
- Charles Gaines
- Chris Gaines
- Clark Gaines
- E. J. Gaines
- Greg Gaines (born 1958)
- Greg Gaines (born 1996)
- Innis Gaines
- Jon Gaines
- Lawrence Gaines
- Michael Gaines
- Phillip Gaines
- Sheldon Gaines
- Wendall Gaines
- Wentford Gaines
- William Gaines
- Charlie Gainor
- Kenneth Gainwell
- George Gaiser
- Blane Gaison
- Tony Gaiter
- Bob Gaiters
- Jared Gaither
- Omar Gaither
- Anthony Gaitor
- Hokie Gajan
- Stan Galazin
- Scott Galbraith
- Harry Galbreath
- Tony Galbreath
- Tipa Galeai
- Dion Gales
- Junior Galette
- Arnold Galiffa
- Ed Galigher
- Willie Galimore
- Bernie Gallagher
- Dave Gallagher
- Edward B. Gallagher
- Frank Gallagher
- Allen Gallaher
- Tommy Gallarda
- Hugh Gallarneau
- Chon Gallegos
- Jim Gallery
- Nick Gallery
- Robert Gallery
- Andy Gallik
- Neville Gallimore
- Laroni Gallishaw
- Wayne Gallman
- Tony Gallovich
- David Galloway
- Duane Galloway
- Joey Galloway
- Mitchell Galloway
- Michael Gallup
- Connor Galvin
- John Galvin (born 1920)
- John Galvin (born 1965)
- Scott Galyon
- Vincent Gamache
- Lu Gambino
- Chris Gamble
- Darryl Gamble
- David Gamble
- Kenny Gamble
- R.C. Gamble
- Trent Gamble
- Chris Gambol
- Bob Gambold
- Billy Gambrell
- Kendall Gammon
- Rusty Ganas
- Terrance Ganaway
- Sonny Gandee
- Dylan Gandy
- Mike Gandy
- Wayne Gandy
- Antonio Gandy-Golden
- Mike Gann
- Chris Gannon
- Rich Gannon
- Graham Gano
- Al Gansberg
- Brian Gant
- Dallas Gant
- Earl Gant
- Kenneth Gant
- Reuben Gant
- Milt Gantenbein
- Quinton Ganther
- Greg Gantt
- Jerry Gantt
- Bob Gaona
- Mark Garalczyk
- Antonio Garay
- Tony Garbarczyk
- Bubba Garcia
- Eddie Garcia
- Elijah Garcia
- Frank Garcia (born 1957)
- Frank Garcia (born 1972)
- Jeff Garcia
- Jim Garcia
- Max Garcia
- Teddy Garcia
- Jerrol Garcia-Williams
- Pierre Garçon
- Dennis Gardeck
- Gus Gardella
- Frank Garden
- Daryl Gardener
- Ron Gardin
- Andrew Gardner
- Barry Gardner
- Birdie Gardner
- Carwell Gardner
- Derrick Gardner
- Don Gardner
- Donnie Gardner
- Ellis Gardner
- Gilbert Gardner
- Isaiah Gardner
- Moe Gardner
- Moose Gardner
- Rich Gardner
- Rod Gardner
- Sauce Gardner
- Talman Gardner
- C. J. Gardner-Johnson
- Chris Gardocki
- Ben Garland
- Chris Garlich
- Don Garlin
- John Garlington
- Kelvin Garmon
- Bill Garnaas
- Bob Garner (born 1923)
- Bob Garner (born 1934)
- Charlie Garner
- Dwight Garner
- Hal Garner
- Mekhi Garner
- Nate Garner
- Sam Garnes
- Dave Garnett
- Joshua Garnett
- Scott Garnett
- Winfield Garnett
- Bill Garnjost
- Jimmy Garoppolo
- David Garrard
- Alvin Garrett
- Bobby Garrett
- Budge Garrett
- Carl Garrett
- Chris Garrett
- Curtis Garrett
- Drake Garrett
- Dub Garrett
- J.D. Garrett
- Jason Garrett
- John Garrett
- Kevin Garrett
- Len Garrett
- Mike Garrett (born 1944)
- Mike Garrett (born 1957)
- Myles Garrett
- Reggie Garrett
- Shane Garrett
- Thurman Garrett
- Gary Garrison
- Walt Garrison
- Gregg Garrity
- Larry Garron
- Eric Garror
- Leon Garror
- Ben Garry
- Chris Gartner
- Art Garvey
- Franny Garvey
- Jonathan Garvin
- Terence Garvin
- Cleveland Gary
- Keith Gary
- Olandis Gary
- Rashan Gary
- Russell Gary
- Shamiel Gary
- Willie Gary
- Dan Garza
- Roberto Garza
- Sammy Garza
- Mike Garzoni

== Gas–Gh ==
- Sam Gash
- Thane Gash
- Myles Gaskin
- Kendall Gaskins
- Percell Gaskins
- Joe Gasparella
- Michael Gasperson
- Ron Gassert
- Mark Gastineau
- Bruce Gaston
- Willie Gaston
- Gates
- Antonio Gates
- Clyde Gates
- DeMarquis Gates
- Lionel Gates
- Nick Gates
- Curtis Gatewood
- Lester Gatewood
- Tom Gatewood
- Rico Gathers
- Frank Gatski
- Gregory Gatson
- Josh Gattis
- Dennis Gaubatz
- Bob Gaudio
- Charlie Gauer
- Frank Gaul
- Rashaan Gaulden
- Hal Gaulke
- Billy Gault
- Don Gault
- Willie Gault
- Steve Gaunty
- Frank Gause
- Quentin Gause
- Dutch Gaustad
- Prentice Gautt
- Mike Gavagan
- Buck Gavin
- Chuck Gavin
- Momčilo Gavrić
- Benjamin Gay
- Bill Gay
- Blenda Gay
- Chet Gay
- Everett Gay
- Jordan Gay
- Matt Gay (born 1970)
- Matt Gay (born 1994)
- Randall Gay
- William Gay (born 1955)
- William Gay (born 1985)
- Willie Gay
- Kent Gaydos
- Ali Gaye
- Chuck Gayer
- Rashid Gayle
- Shaun Gayle
- Trevor Gaylor
- Doug Gaynor
- Frank Gaziano
- Joe Gaziano
- Akbar Gbaja-Biamila
- Kabeer Gbaja-Biamila
- Cory Geason
- Ron Geater
- Clayton Geathers
- Clifton Geathers
- Jumpy Geathers
- Kwame Geathers
- Robert Geathers
- Bob Geddes
- Ken Geddes
- Ben Gedeon
- Gene Gedman
- Chris Gedney
- Mark Gehring
- Bruce Gehrke
- Fred Gehrke
- Jack Gehrke
- Kaylon Geiger
- Chris Geile
- Justin Geisinger
- Chuck Gelatka
- Stan Gelbaugh
- Peter Gent
- Byron Gentry
- Curt Gentry
- Dale Gentry
- Dennis Gentry
- Lee Gentry
- Tanner Gentry
- Weldon Gentry
- Zach Gentry
- Allan George
- Bill George
- Ed George
- Eddie George
- Jeff George (born 1957)
- Jeff George (born 1967)
- Jeremiah George
- Karl George
- Matt George
- Ray George
- Ron George
- Spencer George
- Steve George
- Tim George
- Tony George
- Sid Gepford
- John Gerak
- K. J. Gerard
- Patsy Gerardi
- Woody Gerber
- Tom Geredine
- Roy Gerela
- Chris Gerhard
- Garth Gerhart
- Toby Gerhart
- Tom Gerhart
- Joe Geri
- Joe Germaine
- Jammi German
- Jim German
- Reggie Germany
- Willie Germany
- Nathan Gerry
- Carl Gersbach
- Rick Gervais
- Jake Gervase
- John Gesek
- Mike Gesicki
- Chas Gessner
- Gorham Getchell
- Adam Gettis
- David Gettis
- Charlie Getty
- Fred Getz
- Lee Getz
- Bill Geyer
- Lou Ghecas
- Brandon Ghee
- Milt Ghee
- Ronnie Ghent
- Vern Ghersanich
- Eric Ghiaciuc
- Vernon Gholston
- William Gholston

== Gi ==
- Ralph Giacomarro
- Breno Giacomini
- Louie Giammona
- Hal Giancanelli
- Mario Giannelli
- Frank Giannetti
- John Giannoni
- Nick Giaquinto
- Bill Giaver
- Jack Gibbens
- Jim Gibbons
- Mike Gibbons
- Donnie Gibbs
- Jahmyr Gibbs
- Pat Gibbs
- Sonny Gibbs
- Andy Gibler
- Robert Giblin
- Abe Gibron
- Aaron Gibson
- Alec Gibson
- Antonio Gibson (born 1962)
- Antonio Gibson (born 1998)
- Brandon Gibson
- Butch Gibson
- Claude Gibson
- Damon Gibson
- David Gibson
- Dennis Gibson
- Derrick Gibson
- Dick Gibson
- Ernest Gibson
- Gary Gibson
- George Gibson
- Joe Gibson
- Mike Gibson
- Oliver Gibson
- Paul Gibson (born 1924)
- Paul Gibson (born 1948)
- Shelton Gibson
- Thaddeus Gibson
- Tom Gibson
- DJ Giddens
- Frank Giddens
- Wimpy Giddens
- Jon Giesler
- Bob Gifford
- Frank Gifford
- Luke Gifford
- Wayne Gift
- Sam Giguère
- Wallace Gilberry
- Daren Gilbert
- Freddie Gilbert
- Gale Gilbert
- Garrett Gilbert
- Jarron Gilbert
- Justin Gilbert
- Kline Gilbert
- Lewis Gilbert
- Marcus Gilbert
- Mark Gilbert
- Reggie Gilbert
- Sean Gilbert
- Tony Gilbert
- Ulysees Gilbert
- Wally Gilbert
- Zyon Gilbert
- Tom Gilburg
- Cookie Gilchrist
- George Gilchrist
- Marcus Gilchrist
- Dennis Gildea
- Johnny Gildea
- Jason Gildon
- Jimmie Giles
- Joe Giles-Harris
- Garrett Gilkey
- Cam Gill
- John Gill
- Owen Gill
- Randy Gill
- Roger Gill
- Sloko Gill
- Trenton Gill
- Jamie Gillan
- Cullen Gillaspia
- John Gillen
- Scoop Gillespie
- Tyree Gillespie
- Willie Gillespie
- Fred Gillett
- Jim Gillette
- Walker Gillette
- Dondre Gilliam
- Garry Gilliam
- Joe Gilliam
- John Gilliam
- Jon Gilliam
- Reggie Gilliam
- Cory Gilliard
- Fred Gillies
- Blake Gillikin
- Gale Gillingham
- Don Gillis
- Joe Gillis
- Mike Gillislee
- Crockett Gillmore
- Hank Gillo
- Horace Gillom
- Ashton Gillotte
- Bob Gillson
- Willie Gillus
- Alohi Gilman
- Harry Gilmer
- Bryan Gilmore
- Jim Gilmore
- John Gilmore
- Stephon Gilmore
- Steven Gilmore Jr.
- David Gilreath
- Johnny Gilroy
- Mardy Gilyard
- Hubert Ginn
- Ted Ginn Jr.
- Tommie Ginn
- Jerry Ginney
- Matt Giordano
- Paul Gipson
- Tashaun Gipson
- Thomas Gipson
- Trevis Gipson
- Xavier Gipson
- Jug Girard
- Mike Gisler
- Andrew Gissinger
- Patsy Giugliano
- Chris Givens
- David Givens
- Kevin Givens
- Reggie Givens
- Ernest Givins
- Chris Gizzi

== Gl–Gol ==
- Scotty Glacken
- Chet Gladchuk
- Mack Gladden
- Bob Gladieux
- Charles Gladman
- Jeff Gladney
- Tony Gladney
- Joe Glamp
- Chris Glaser
- Brian Glasgow
- Graham Glasgow
- Jordan Glasgow
- Nesby Glasgow
- Ryan Glasgow
- Bill Glass
- Chip Glass
- Glenn Glass
- Leland Glass
- William Glass
- Willis Glassgow
- Tom Glassic
- Frank Glassman
- Morris Glassman
- Fred Glatz
- Ka'Lial Glaud
- Charles Glaze
- Delmar Glaze
- Bob Glazebrook
- Steve Gleason
- Aaron Glenn
- Bill Glenn
- Cody Glenn
- Cordy Glenn
- Howard Glenn
- Jacoby Glenn
- Jason Glenn
- Kerry Glenn
- Tarik Glenn
- Terry Glenn
- Vencie Glenn
- George Glennie
- Mike Glennon
- Ed Glick
- Fred Glick
- Gary Glick
- Norm Glockson
- Fred Gloden
- Clyde Glosson
- Andrew Glover
- Clyde Glover
- Kevin Glover
- La'Roi Glover
- LaVar Glover
- Phil Glover
- Rich Glover
- Travis Glover
- Tay Glover-Wright
- Mark Glowinski
- Larry Glueck
- Junior Glymph
- Paul Goad
- Tim Goad
- Art Gob
- Les Goble
- Chris Gocong
- Davon Godchaux
- Ed Goddard
- Johnathan Goddard
- Na'Shan Goddard
- Charles Godfrey
- Chris Godfrey
- Herb Godfrey
- Randall Godfrey
- Chukwuebuka Godrick
- Bill Godwin
- Chris Godwin
- Terry Godwin
- Walt Godwin
- Leo Goeas
- Brad Goebel
- Hank Goebel
- Joe Goebel
- Paul G. Goebel
- George Goeddeke
- Luke Goedeke
- Dallas Goedert
- Art Goerke
- Travis Goethel
- Angus Goetz
- Clark Goff
- Jared Goff
- Jonathan Goff
- Mike Goff
- Robert Goff
- Willard Goff
- Derrel Gofourth
- Kevin Gogan
- Keith Goganious
- Charlie Gogolak
- Pete Gogolak
- Dan Goich
- Nick Goings
- Ian Gold
- Adam Goldberg
- Bill Goldberg
- Marshall Goldberg
- Brittan Golden
- Jack Golden
- Markus Golden
- Matthew Golden
- Robert Golden
- Tim Golden
- Charles Goldenberg
- Joe Golding
- Zack Golditch
- Eddie Goldman
- Sam Goldman
- John Goldsberry
- Earl Goldsmith
- Wendell Goldsmith
- Dashon Goldson
- Al Goldstein
- Ralph Goldston
- Archie Golembeski
- John Golemgeske
- Bob Golic
- Mike Golic
- Kenny Golladay
- Rudy Gollomb
- Gene Golsen
- Tom Golsen
- Jerry Golsteyn
- Chauncey Golston
- Kedric Golston
- Rick Goltz
- Chris Golub

== Gom–Goz ==
- Dejon Gomes
- Bill Gompers
- Matt Goncalves
- George Gonda
- Matt Gono
- Goose Gonsoulin
- Bob Gonya
- John Gonzaga
- Anthony Gonzalez
- Christian Gonzalez
- Joaquin Gonzalez
- Leon Gonzalez
- Noe Gonzalez
- Pete Gonzalez
- Tony Gonzalez
- Zane Gonzalez
- Jeff Gooch
- Denzelle Good
- Tom Good
- Julian Good-Jones
- Royce Goodbread
- Kelly Goodburn
- Brett Goode
- Cameron Goode
- Chris Goode
- Conrad Goode
- Don Goode
- Irv Goode
- John Goode
- Kerry Goode
- Najee Goode
- Rob Goode
- Tom Goode
- Ahmad Gooden
- Tavares Gooden
- Zaviar Gooden
- Stephen Goodin
- Anthony Goodlow
- Darryl Goodlow
- Eugene Goodlow
- André Goodman
- Aubrey Goodman
- Brian Goodman
- Don Goodman
- Hank Goodman
- Harvey Goodman
- Herbert Goodman
- John Goodman
- Les Goodman
- Malliciah Goodman
- Richard Goodman
- Clyde Goodnight
- Owen Goodnight
- Dwayne Goodrich
- Mario Goodrich
- Bob Goodridge
- Charlie Goodrum
- B. J. Goodson
- Demetri Goodson
- John Goodson
- Mike Goodson
- Tyler Goodson
- Joey Goodspeed
- Mark Goodspeed
- C.J. Goodwin
- D'Andre Goodwin
- Doug Goodwin
- Earl Goodwin
- Hunter Goodwin
- Jonathan Goodwin
- Marquise Goodwin
- Myrl Goodwin
- Ron Goodwin
- Tod Goodwin
- John Goodyear
- Mike Goolsby
- Shag Goolsby
- Tom Goosby
- Ron Goovert
- Alex Gordon
- Amon Gordon
- Bobby Gordon
- Charles Gordon
- Cletis Gordon
- Cornell Gordon
- Darrien Gordon
- Dick Gordon
- Dillon Gordon
- Dwayne Gordon
- Ira Gordon
- John Gordon
- Josh Gordon
- Kyler Gordon
- Lamar Gordon
- Larry Gordon
- Lennox Gordon
- Lou Gordon
- Melvin Gordon
- Ollie Gordon II
- Richard Gordon
- Sonny Gordon
- Steve Gordon
- Tim Gordon
- John Gordy
- Josh Gordy
- Derrick Gore
- Frank Gore
- Frank Gore Jr.
- Gordon Gore
- Stacy Gore
- Chuck Gorecki
- Alex Gorgal
- Ken Gorgal
- Pete Gorgone
- Brandon Gorin
- Walt Gorinski
- Doc Gorman
- Earl Gorman
- Tom Gormley
- Danny Gorrer
- Flop Gorrill
- Antonio Goss
- Donald Goss
- Jason Goss
- Gene Gossage
- Bruce Gossett
- Colby Gossett
- Jeff Gossett
- Stephen Gostkowski
- Preston Gothard
- Len Gotshalk
- Adam Gotsis
- Ben Gottschalk
- Darren Gottschalk
- Anthony Gould
- Robbie Gould
- Richard Gouraige
- Kurt Gouveia
- Paul Governali
- Tay Gowan
- Cornell Gowdy
- Toby Gowin
- Brian Gowins
- Hippo Gozdowski

== Gra ==
- Ted Grabinski
- Tylan Grable
- Gene Grabosky
- Jim Grabowski
- Jermaine Grace
- Les Grace
- Steven Grace
- Sam Graddy
- Randy Gradishar
- Bruce Gradkowski
- Gino Gradkowski
- Garry Grady
- Dave Graf
- Rick Graf
- Neil Graff
- Chris Gragg
- Scott Gragg
- Aaron Graham
- Al Graham
- Art Graham
- Ben Graham
- Brandon Graham
- Clarence Graham
- Corey Graham
- Daniel Graham
- Dave Graham
- David Graham
- DeMingo Graham
- Derrick Graham
- Don Graham
- Earnest Graham
- Fred Graham
- Garrett Graham
- Hason Graham
- Jaeden Graham
- Jalen Graham
- Jay Graham
- Jeff Graham
- Jimmy Graham
- Kenny Graham
- Kent Graham
- Les Graham
- Lyle Graham
- Mason Graham
- Mike Graham
- Milt Graham
- Nick Graham
- Otto Graham
- Ray Graham
- Roger Graham
- Scottie Graham
- Shayne Graham
- Ta'Quon Graham
- Thomas Graham Jr.
- T. J. Graham
- Tom Graham (born 1909)
- Tom Graham (born 1950)
- William Graham
- Ed Grain
- Bill Gramática
- Martín Gramática
- John Granby
- Ken Grandberry
- Sonny Grandelius
- Carl Granderson
- Rufus Granderson
- George Grandinette
- Cam Grandy
- Gardie Grange
- Red Grange
- Charley Granger
- Hoyle Granger
- Norm Granger
- Dave Grannell
- Kylen Granson
- Aaron Grant
- African Grant
- Alan Grant
- Bob Grant
- Bud Grant
- Charles Grant (born 1978)
- Charles Grant (born 2002)
- Cie Grant
- Corey Grant
- Curtis Grant
- Darryl Grant
- David Grant
- DeLawrence Grant
- Deon Grant
- Doran Grant
- Ducky Grant
- Ernest Grant
- Frank Grant
- Jakeem Grant
- Janarion Grant
- John Grant
- Kenneth Grant
- Larry Grant
- Len Grant
- Orantes Grant
- Otis Grant
- Reggie Grant
- Richie Grant
- Rosie Grant
- Rupert Grant
- Ryan Grant (born 1982)
- Ryan Grant (born 1990)
- Steve Grant
- Wes Grant
- Will Grant
- Larry Grantham
- Billy Granville
- Paul Grasmanis
- Hroniss Grasu
- Carl Grate
- Willie Grate
- Dwayne Gratz
- Jeff Grau
- Gordon Gravelle
- Marsharne Graves
- Ray Graves
- Rory Graves
- Tom Graves
- White Graves
- Bill Gray
- Bobby Gray
- Carlton Gray
- Cecil Gray
- Cedric Gray
- Chris Gray
- Cyrus Gray
- Dan Gray
- Danny Gray
- David Gray
- Derwin Gray (born 1971)
- Derwin Gray (born 1995)
- Dolly Gray impostor
- Earnest Gray
- Eric Gray
- Hector Gray
- Jerry Gray
- Jim Gray
- Johnnie Gray
- Jonas Gray
- J. T. Gray
- Ken Gray
- Kevin Gray
- Leon Gray
- MarQueis Gray
- Mel Gray (born 1948)
- Mel Gray (born 1961)
- Moses Gray
- Noah Gray
- Oscar Gray
- Paul Gray
- Quinn Gray
- Sam Gray
- Tim Gray
- Torrian Gray
- Vincent Gray
- Gray Horse
- Mike Graybill
- Cyril Grayson
- Dave Grayson
- David Grayson
- Tony Graziani

== Grb–Gre ==
- Elvis Grbac
- Gary Greaves
- Dick Grecni
- Don Greco
- John Greco
- Bucky Greeley
- Aaron Green
- A. J. Green (born 1988)
- A. J. Green (born 1998)
- Ahman Green
- Alex Green (born 1965)
- Alex Green (born 1988)
- Allen Green
- Antoine Green
- Art Green (born 1946)
- Art Green (born 2000)
- B.J. Green
- Barrett Green
- Bobby Joe Green
- Boyce Green
- Brandon Green
- Bubba Green
- Charlie Green
- Chaz Green
- Chris Green
- Cleveland Green
- Cornell Green (born 1940)
- Cornell Green (born 1976)
- Curtis Green
- Darrell Green
- Dave Green
- David Green (born 1953)
- David Green (born 1972)
- Donnie Green
- Donny Green
- E. G. Green
- Eric Green (born 1967)
- Eric Green (born 1982)
- Ernie Green
- Farrod Green
- Gary Green
- Gaston Green
- Gerri Green
- Harold Green
- Howard Green
- Hugh Green
- Isaiah Green
- Jacob Green
- Jacquez Green
- Jamaal Green
- Jarvis Green
- Jerry Green
- Jessie Green
- Joe Green
- John Green
- Johnny Green
- Jonte Green
- Justin Green (born 1982)
- Justin Green (born 1991)
- Kendrick Green
- Kenyon Green
- Ladarius Green
- Lamont Green
- Larry Green
- Louis Green
- Marcus Green
- Mark Green
- Marshay Green
- Mike Green (born 1961)
- Mike Green (born September 2, 1976)
- Mike Green (born December 6, 1976)
- Mike Green (born 2003)
- Paul Green
- Rasheem Green
- Ray Green
- Renardo Green
- Robert Green
- Roderick Green
- Rogerick Green
- Ron Green
- Roy Green
- Sammy Green
- Skyler Green
- Tion Green
- Tim Green
- T. J. Green
- Tony Green
- Trent Green
- Tyronne Green
- Van Green
- Vee Green
- Victor Green
- Virgil Green
- William Green
- Willie Green
- Woody Green
- Yatil Green
- Dorial Green-Beckham
- Jonathan Greenard
- Ben Greenberg
- A.J. Greene
- Al Greene
- Andrew Greene
- Courtney Greene
- Danny Greene
- Doug Greene
- Ed Greene
- Frank Greene
- Joe Greene
- John Greene
- Ken Greene
- Kevin Greene
- Khaseem Greene
- Marcellus Greene
- Mike Greene
- Nelson Greene
- Rashad Greene
- Raven Greene
- Scott Greene
- Shonn Greene
- Ted Greene
- Tiger Greene
- Tom Greene
- Tony Greene
- Tracy Greene
- BenJarvus Green-Ellis
- Norm Greeney
- Tom Greenfield
- Bob Greenhalgh
- Isaiah Greenhouse
- Duke Greenich
- Ethan Greenidge
- Dre Greenlaw
- Fritz Greenlee
- Donn Greenshields
- Chad Greenway
- Carl Greenwood
- Chris Greenwood
- Cory Greenwood
- David Greenwood
- Don Greenwood
- Glenn Greenwood
- L. C. Greenwood
- Morlon Greenwood
- Al Greer
- Charlie Greer
- Curtis Greer
- Donovan Greer
- Jabari Greer
- Jim Greer
- Terry Greer
- Ted Grefe
- Edd Gregg
- Forrest Gregg
- Kelly Gregg
- Bob Gregor
- Ben Gregory
- Bill Gregory
- Bruce Gregory
- Damian Gregory
- Eric Gregory
- Garland Gregory
- Gil Gregory
- Glynn Gregory
- Jack Gregory (born 1915)
- Jack Gregory (born 1944)
- Ken Gregory
- Mike Gregory
- Randy Gregory
- Steve Gregory
- Ted Gregory
- Chris Greisen
- Nick Greisen
- Hank Gremminger
- Keith Grennan
- Bob Gresham
- Clint Gresham
- Jermaine Gresham

== Grg–Gry ==
- Visco Grgich
- Marion Grice
- Shane Grice
- Antonio Grier
- Marrio Grier
- Rosey Grier
- Will Grier
- Bob Griese
- Brian Griese
- Everson Griffen
- Hal Griffen
- Archie Griffin
- Bob Griffin
- Bobbie Griffin
- Cedric Griffin
- Cornelius Griffin
- Courtney Griffin
- Damon Griffin
- Don Griffin (born 1922)
- Don Griffin (born 1964)
- Garrett Griffin
- James Griffin
- Jeff Griffin
- Jim Griffin
- John Griffin (born 1939)
- John Griffin (born 1988)
- Keith Griffin
- Kris Griffin
- Larry Griffin
- Leonard Griffin
- Michael Griffin
- Quentin Griffin
- Ray Griffin
- Robert Griffin III
- Ryan Griffin (born 1989)
- Ryan Griffin (born 1990)
- Shaquem Griffin
- Shaquill Griffin
- Stephen Griffin
- Steve Griffin (born 1963)
- Steve Griffin (born 1964)
- Wade Griffin
- Nakia Griffin-Stewart
- Glynn Griffing
- Forrest Griffith
- Homer Griffith
- Howard Griffith
- Jonas Griffith
- Justin Griffith
- Rich Griffith
- Robert Griffith
- Russell Griffith
- Red Griffiths
- John Grigas
- Chubby Grigg
- Tex Grigg
- Anthony Griggs
- Billy Griggs
- David Griggs
- Hal Griggs
- Perry Griggs
- Frank Grigonis
- Boomer Grigsby
- Nicholas Grigsby
- Otis Grigsby
- Bob Grim
- Xavier Grimble
- Billy Grimes
- Brent Grimes
- George Grimes
- Jonathan Grimes
- Phil Grimes
- Randy Grimes
- Reggie Grimes
- Cody Grimm
- Dan Grimm
- Russ Grimm
- Ed Grimsley
- John Grimsley
- David Grinnage
- Tyler Grisham
- Geneo Grissom
- Clif Groce
- DeJuan Groce
- Ron Groce
- Steve Grogan
- Bill Groman
- Chris Gronkowski
- Dan Gronkowski
- Glenn Gronkowski
- Rob Gronkowski
- Andy Groom
- Jerry Groom
- Mel Groomes
- Elois Grooms
- Matt Grootegoed
- Earl Gros
- Al Gross
- Andy Gross
- George Gross
- Jordan Gross
- Lee Gross
- Yetur Gross-Matos
- Lee Grosscup
- Burt Grossman
- Jack Grossman
- Randy Grossman
- Rex Grossman (born 1924)
- Rex Grossman (born 1980)
- George Grosvenor
- Jeff Groth
- Bob Grottkau
- Jake Grove
- Roger Grove
- George Groves
- Quentin Groves
- Monty Grow
- Ryan Groy
- Lou Groza
- Ben Grubbs
- Charles Grube
- Frank Grube
- Bob Gruber
- Herb Gruber
- Paul Gruber
- Kamu Grugier-Hill
- Sam Gruneisen
- Tim Grunhard
- Blake Grupe
- Bob Grupp
- Mike Gruttadauria
- Al Grygo
- Aaron Grymes
- Darrell Grymes

== Gu–Gw ==
- Albert Guarnieri
- Pat Gucciardo
- Pete Gudauskas
- Len Gudd
- Henry Gude
- Scott Gudmundson
- Mike Guendling
- Jim Gueno
- Gregg Guenther
- Isaac Guerendo
- Dick Guesman
- Terry Guess
- Roy Guffey
- Neal Guggemos
- Ralph Guglielmi
- Derrius Guice
- Javelin Guidry
- Kevin Guidry
- Paul Guidry
- Rusty Guilbeau
- John Guillory
- Tony Guillory
- Letroy Guion
- Mike Gulian
- Eric Guliford
- David Gulledge
- Don Gulseth
- George Gulyanics
- Mike Guman
- Jose Gumbs
- Andy Gump
- Bob Gunderman
- Harry Gunderson
- Herman Gundlach
- Greyson Gunheim
- Harland Gunn
- Jimmy Gunn
- Lance Gunn
- Mark Gunn
- Riley Gunnels
- Harry Gunner
- Jeffrey Gunter
- Ladarius Gunter
- Mike Gunter
- Rodney Gunter
- Buck Gurley
- Todd Gurley
- Tori Gurley
- Andre Gurode
- Albert Gursky
- Mike Gussie
- Ed Gustafson
- Jim Gustafson
- Porter Gustin
- Grant Guthrie
- Keith Guthrie
- Brock Gutierrez
- Matt Gutierrez
- Sebastian Gutierrez
- Al Gutknecht
- Ace Gutowsky
- Bill Gutteron
- Buzz Guy
- Charlie Guy
- Lawrence Guy
- Louis Guy
- Ray Guy
- Winston Guy
- Thomas Guynes
- Joe Guyon
- Gary Guyton
- Jalen Guyton
- Myron Guyton
- Tyler Guyton
- John Guzik (born 1936)
- John Guzik (born 1962)
- Ramon Guzman
- Obum Gwacham
- Ross Gwinn
- Milo Gwosden
- Jovaughn Gwyn
