= 1992 Denver Broncos season =

American football team season

- Owner: Pat Bowlen
- General manager: John Beake
- Head coach: Dan Reeves
- Offensive coordinator: George Henshaw
- Defensive coordinator: Wade Phillips
- Home stadium: Mile High Stadium

Results
- Record: 8–8
- Division place: 3rd AFC West
- Playoffs: Did not qualify

Uniform
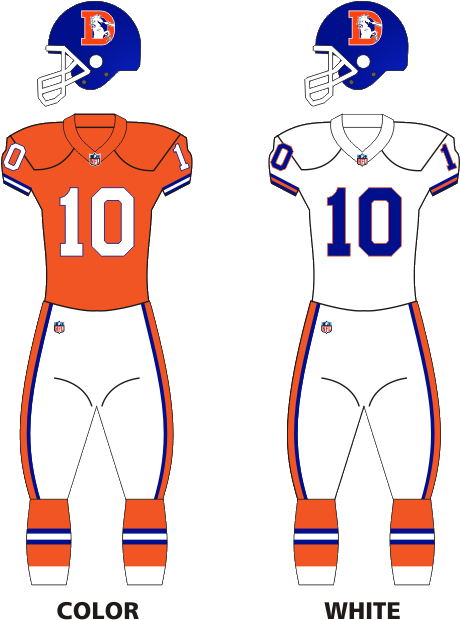

The 1992 Denver Broncos season was the team's 33rd year in professional football and its 23rd with the National Football League (NFL). Overall, this team finished with an 8–8 record and did not make the playoffs. It was also head coach Dan Reeves' twelfth and final season as head coach. He was fired and replaced by Wade Phillips the following season. This would be the last time the Broncos ranked bottom 10 on offense and defense until the 2023 season.

== Offseason ==
Additions	Subtractions
RB Sammie Smith (Dolphins)	QB Gary Kubiak (retirement)
	RB Bobby Humphrey (Dolphins)

=== NFL draft ===
1992 Denver Broncos draft
Round	Pick	Player	Position	College	Notes
1	25	Tommy Maddox	Quarterback	UCLA	
2	54	Shane Dronett	Defensive end	Texas	
4	110	Chuck Johnson	Guard	Texas	
5	137	Frank Robinson	Defensive back	Boise State	
7	170	Ron Geater	Defensive end	Iowa	
7	181	Jim Johnson	Tackle	Michigan State	
7	193	Jon Bostick	Wide receiver	Nebraska	
8	208	Dietrich Lockridge	Guard	Jackson State	
9	249	Muhammad Oliver	Cornerback	Oregon	
10	278	Bob Meeks	Center	Auburn	
11	305	Cedric Tillman	Wide receiver	Alcorn State	
12	334	John Granby	Defensive back	Virginia Tech	
Made roster * Made at least one Pro Bowl during career

=== Undrafted free agents ===
1992 undrafted free agents of note
Player	Position	College
Paschall Davis	Linebacker	Texas A&I
Mark Flythe	Defensive end	Penn State
Russell Freeman	Guard	Georgia Tech

== Staff ==
1992 Denver Broncos staff
Front office: President and Chief Executive Officer – Pat Bowlen; General Manager – John Beake; Director of Football Operations – Lide Huggins; Director of Player Personnel – Reed Johnson; Head coaches: Vice President/Head Coach – Dan Reeves; Special Assistant – Marvin Bass; Offensive coaches: Offensive Coordinator/Wide Receivers – George Henshaw; Quarterbacks – Raymond Berry; Running Backs – Mo Forte; Offensive Line – Pete Mangurian	Defensive coaches: Defensive Coordinator – Wade Phillips; Defensive Line – Ernie Stautner; Linebackers – Mike Nolan; Defensive Backs – Charlie Waters; Defensive Assistant – Barney Chavous; Defensive Quality Control – Joe DeCamillis; Special teams coaches: Tight Ends/Special Teams – Harold Richardson; Strength and conditioning: Strength/Conditioning – Al Miller

== Roster ==
1992 Denver Broncos roster
Quarterbacks (QB): 7 John Elway; 8 Tommy Maddox; 12 Shawn Moore; Running backs (RB): 40 Jeff Alexander; 28 Gaston Green; 31 Victor Jones; 20 Greg Lewis; 38 Reggie Rivers; Wide receivers (WR): 80 Mark Jackson; 82 Vance Johnson; 86 Arthur Marshall; 87 Cedric Tillman; Tight ends (TE): 89 Reggie Johnson; 88 Clarence Kay; 81 Shannon Sharpe	Offensive linemen (OL): 62 Jeff Davidson G; 68 Russell Freeman T; 66 Chuck Johnson T; 72 Keith Kartz C; 76 Ken Lanier T; 61 Bob Meeks C; 79 Dave Widell; 67 Doug Widell G; Defensive linemen (DL): 99 Shane Dronett DE; 92 Ron Geater NT; 71 Greg Kragen NT; 70 Brian Sochia DE; 54 Keith Traylor NT; 96 Kenny Walker DE	Linebackers (LB): 56 Michael Brooks ILB; 51 Mike Croel OLB; 73 Simon Fletcher OLB; 55 John Kacherski OLB; 59 Tim Lucas OLB; 77 Karl Mecklenburg ILB; 52 Jeff Mills OLB; 50 John Sullins ILB; Defensive backs (DB): 27 Steve Atwater FS; 34 Tyrone Braxton CB; 29 Charles Dimry CB; 24 Wymon Henderson CB; 21 Le-Lo Lang CB; 22 Alton Montgomery FS/KR; 36 Frank Robinson CB; 49 Dennis Smith SS; Special teams (ST): 5 Brad Daluiso K/P; 9 David Treadwell K	Practice squad: -- Mark Flythe DE; -- Jim Johnson T; -- Russ McCullough T; Reserve: 65 Elbert Crawford G/C (PUP); 93 Ronnie Haliburton OLB (IR); 2 Mike Horan P (IR); 42 Muhammad Oliver CB (IR); 91 Willie Oshodin DE (PUP); 78 Frank Pollack G (IR); 85 Derek Russell (IR); 30 Steve Sewell RB (IR); 32 Sammie Smith RB (IR); 25 Carlos Snow RB (IR); Rookies in italics 47 active, 10 reserve, 3 practice squad

== Schedule ==
Week	Date	Opponent	Result	Record	Venue	Attendance
1	September 6	**Los Angeles Raiders**	**W** 17–13	1–0	Mile High Stadium	75,418
2	September 13	**San Diego Chargers**	**W** 21–13	2–0	Mile High Stadium	74,367
3	September 20	at Philadelphia Eagles	**L** 0–30	2–1	Veterans Stadium	65,833
4	September 27	at Cleveland Browns	**W** 12–0	3–1	Cleveland Municipal Stadium	78,064
5	October 4	**Kansas City Chiefs**	**W** 20–19	4–1	Mile High Stadium	75,629
6	October 12	at Washington Redskins	**L** 3–34	4–2	RFK Stadium	56,371
7	October 18	Houston Oilers	**W** 27–21	5–2	Mile High Stadium	74,827
8	October 25	at **San Diego Chargers**	**L** 21–24	5–3	Jack Murphy Stadium	53,576
9	Bye					
10	November 8	New York Jets	**W** 27–16	6–3	Mile High Stadium	74,678
11	November 15	New York Giants	**W** 27–13	7–3	Mile High Stadium	75,269
12	November 22	at **Los Angeles Raiders**	**L** 0–24	7–4	Los Angeles Memorial Coliseum	50,011
13	November 30	at **Seattle Seahawks**	**L** 13–16	7–5	Kingdome	51,612
14	December 6	Dallas Cowboys	**L** 27–31	7–6	Mile High Stadium	74,946
15	December 12	at Buffalo Bills	**L** 17–27	7–7	Rich Stadium	71,740
16	December 20	**Seattle Seahawks**	**W** 10–6	8–7	Mile High Stadium	72,570
17	December 27	at **Kansas City Chiefs**	**L** 20–42	8–8	Arrowhead Stadium	76,240
Note: Intra-division opponents are in **bold** text.

== Standings ==
AFC West
	W	L	T	PCT	DIV	CONF	PF	PA	STK
^{(3)} San Diego Chargers	11	5	0	.688	5–3	9–5	335	241	W7
^{(6)} Kansas City Chiefs	10	6	0	.625	6–2	8–4	348	282	W1
Denver Broncos	8	8	0	.500	4–4	7–5	262	329	L1
Los Angeles Raiders	7	9	0	.438	4–4	5–7	249	281	W1
Seattle Seahawks	2	14	0	.125	1–7	2–10	140	312	L4
