= Alcoa High School =

Public high school in Alcoa, Tennessee, United States

Location
- Alcoa, Blount County, Tennessee; United States
- Coordinates: 35°47′32″N 83°58′47″W

Information
- Type: Public School
- Motto: "Achieving High Standards"
- School district: Alcoa City Schools
- Principal: Caleb Tipton
- Staff: 47.00 (FTE)
- Enrollment: 701 (2023-2024)
- Student to teacher ratio: 14.91
- Colors: Maroon and Gray
- Mascot: Tornadoes
- Rival: Maryville High School
- Website: https://www.alcoahighschool.com

Alcoa High School is a 9-12 public high school located in Alcoa, Tennessee. It is the only high school in the Alcoa City Schools system. Recently moved into the NEW Alcoa High School. It is accredited by the Southern Association of Colleges and Schools (SACS).

== Academics ==
Alcoa High School currently uses a block schedule for their classes.

There are two foreign languages offered at Alcoa High School including German and Spanish.

Alcoa currently offers various AP courses, such as Statistics, United States History, United States Government, World Geography, and English, as well as several dual enrollment courses in cooperation with Pellissippi State Community College and Maryville College.

== Athletics ==
Alcoa's athletic teams are known as the "Tornadoes."

- Football - The school's football team has won 22 TSSAA state championships, to best their rival Maryville High School (16) for the most in state history. Seven of these came in 2004–2010 in Class 2A and later Class 3A, during which the team recorded 84 wins and only six losses, including a 43-game winning streak that was ranked among the best in the nation. The win-streak ended when Alcoa was defeated by Maryville at the beginning of the 2011 season. Randall Cobb, who was drafted by the Green Bay Packers, is among the football alumni from that championship stretch. The team's latest championship was won with a 42–20 victory over East Nashville Magnet School in 2023, marking a 9th consecutive state championship.
- Men's Soccer -
- Golf - Three individuals have won the TSSAA State Golf Tournament Individual title in the school's history, the most recent being in 2010.
- Men's Basketball
- Women's Basketball
- Baseball
- Softball
- Women's Soccer - The Lady T's Soccer team won the State Championship in 2017.
- Wrestling-Established: 1999-2000 2X State Traditional Runner Up (2014, 2016) 6X Region Dual Champions (2014, 2015, 2016, 2017, 2018, 2019) 12 Individual State Champions 34 Individual State Medalists.

== Notable alumni ==
- Randall Cobb, American football wide receiver for the Green Bay Packers of the National Football League, Round 2 Pick 64 in the 2011 NFL draft
- Albert Davis, SR (TSU) 1971 Philadelphia Eagles (14 games)
- Dave Davis, former wide receiver in the National Football League, played for the Green Bay Packers, Pittsburgh Steelers and the New Orleans Saints
- Tim George, former NFL football player
- Dante Harris, basketball player
- Shannon Mitchell, former tight end in the National Football League, played for the San Diego Chargers for 4 years. Attended the University of Georgia.
- Billy Williams, NFL player
