= Billy Williams (American football) =

American football player (born 1971)

No. 19
- Position: Wide receiver

Personal information
- Born: June 7, 1971 (age 55); Alcoa, Tennessee, U.S.
- Listed height: 5 ft 11 in (1.80 m)
- Listed weight: 175 lb (79 kg)

Career information
- High school: Alcoa
- College: Northeastern Oklahoma A&M (1991–1992); Tennessee (1993–1994)
- NFL draft: 1995: 7th round, 212th overall pick

Career history
- Arizona Cardinals (1995)*; St. Louis Rams (1995–1996); Washington Redskins (1997)*
- * Offseason or practice squad member only
- Stats at Pro Football Reference

Billy Louis Williams (born June 7, 1971) is an American former professional football wide receiver who played one season with the St. Louis Rams of the National Football League (NFL). He was selected by the Arizona Cardinals in the seventh round of the 1995 NFL draft. He played college football at Northeastern Oklahoma A&M College and the University of Tennessee.

== Early life ==
Billy Louis Williams was born on June 7, 1971, in Alcoa, Tennessee. He attended Alcoa High School in Alcoa. He was inducted into the Blount County Sports Hall of Fame in 2017.

== College career ==
Williams first played college football at Northeastern Oklahoma A&M College from 1991 to 1992. He was then a two-year letterman for the Tennessee Volunteers from 1993 to 1994. He caught 39 passes for 513 yards and five touchdowns in 1993 while also returning 13 kicks for 369 yards. His 28.4 yards per kick return was the highest in the Southeastern Conference that season. Williams recorded 20 receptions for 217 yards and two touchdowns as a senior in 1994 while returning 17 kicks for 353 yards.

== Professional career ==
Pre-draft measurables
Height	Weight	Arm length	Hand span	40-yard dash	10-yard split	20-yard split	Broad jump
5 ft 11 in (1.80 m)	175 lb (79 kg)	30 in (0.76 m)	9 1/2 in (0.24 m)	4.58 s	1.64 s	2.70 s	9 ft 9 in (2.97 m)
All values from NFL Combine

Williams was selected by the Arizona Cardinals in the seventh round, with the 212th overall pick, of the 1995 NFL draft. He officially signed with the team on July 24. He was released by the Cardinals on August 27, 1995.

Williams was signed to the practice squad of the St. Louis Rams on August 28, 1995. He was promoted to the active roster on December 20, 1995, but did not appear in any games during the 1995 season. He was released on August 25, 1996, and signed to the practice squad the next day. He was promoted to the active roster on September 7 and played in one game during the 1996 season without recording any statistics before being placed on injured reserve on October 14, 1996. Williams became a free agent after the season.

Williams signed with the Washington Redskins on July 11, 1997. He was released on August 18, 1997.

== Personal life ==
Williams is the cousin of fellow NFL player Randall Cobb.
