= Tim George =

American football player (born 1951)

No. 89, 82
- Position: Wide receiver

Personal information
- Born: October 4, 1951 (age 75); Alcoa, Tennessee, U.S.
- Listed height: 6 ft 5 in (1.96 m)
- Listed weight: 225 lb (102 kg)

Career information
- High school: Alcoa
- College: Carson–Newman College
- NFL draft: 1973: 3rd round, 16th overall pick

Career history
- Cincinnati Bengals (1973); Cleveland Browns (1974)

Awards and highlights
- NAIA National Championship MVP (1972)

Career NFL statistics
- Games played: 20
- Games started: 0
- Receptions: 2
- Yards gained: 28
- Average gained: 14
- Touchdowns: 0
- Stats at Pro Football Reference

Tim George (born October 4, 1951) is an American former professional football player who was a wide receiver in the National Football League (NFL). He played college football at Carson–Newman College in Tennessee before being selected by the Cincinnati Bengals in the 1973 NFL draft; he played two seasons in the NFL for the Bengals and the Cleveland Browns, before spending several seasons in the World Football League (WFL).

== Career ==
Born in Alcoa, Tennessee, George, a graduate of Alcoa High School, became a star wide receiver at Carson–Newman College, where he helped the team reach the 1972 National Association of Intercollegiate Athletics championship game; Carson–Newman lost the championship to East Texas State by a score of 21–18, however George was named the game's Most Valuable Player.

Following his college career, George was selected by the Cincinnati Bengals of the National Football League, using the 16th pick of the third round in the 1973 NFL draft. George would appear in twelve games for the Bengals during the 1973 season; he finished the year credited with two receptions for a total of 28 yards gained. Released from the team after the 1973 season, George signed with the Cleveland Browns for 1974, appearing in eight games but not having any receptions over the course of the year. George was cut by the Browns before the start of the 1975 football season. Following his release from the Browns, George moved to the World Football League, where he played for teams in Philadelphia and Charlotte for several seasons.

George was inducted into the Carson–Newman Athletic Hall of Fame in 2007 and the Blount County Sports Hall of Fame in 2008.
