= Shannon Mitchell =

American football player (born 1972)

No. 89, 86
- Position: Tight end

Personal information
- Born: March 28, 1972 (age 54); Alcoa, Tennessee, U.S.
- Listed height: 6 ft 2 in (1.88 m)
- Listed weight: 245 lb (111 kg)

Career information
- High school: Alcoa
- College: Georgia (1990–1993)
- NFL draft: 1994: undrafted

Career history
- San Diego Chargers (1994–1997)

Awards and highlights
- First-team All-SEC (1993)

Career NFL statistics
- Receptions: 25
- Receiving yards: 207
- Touchdowns: 1
- Stats at Pro Football Reference

Shannon Lamont Mitchell (born March 28, 1972) is an American former professional football player who was a tight end for four seasons with the San Diego Chargers of the National Football League (NFL). He played college football for the Georgia Bulldogs.

== Early life ==
Shannon Lamont Mitchell was born on March 28, 1972, in Alcoa, Tennessee. He attended Alcoa High School in Alcoa.

== College career ==
Mitchell was a four-year letterman at the University of Georgia from 1990 to 1993. He caught 11 passes for 123 yards and one touchdown in 1990, 19 passes for 176 and one touchdown in 1991, 20 passes for 308 yards and one touchdown in 1992, and 49 passes for 539 yards and two touchdowns in 1993. Mitchell was named first-team All-SEC by both the Associated Press and Coaches his senior year in 1993.

== Professional career ==
After going undrafted in the 1994 NFL draft, Mitchell signed with the San Diego Chargers on April 28. He played in all 16 games, starting six, for the Chargers during his rookie year in 1994, recording 11 receptions for 105 yards. He also appeared in three playoff games that season, catching one pass for 19 yards. He played in all 16 games, starting two, during the 1995 season, catching three passes for 31 yards and one touchdown. He also appeared in one playoff game that year. Mitchell played in all 16 games for the third consecutive season, starting 11, in 1996, totaling 10 catches for 57 yards. He became a free agent after the 1996 season. He later re-signed with the Chargers on November 26, 1997. He appeared in four games, starting one, for the team during the 1997 season, recording one reception for 14 yards. He became a free agent again after the 1997 season.

== Personal life ==
Mitchell is the cousin of NFL player Randall Cobb.
