= Randall Cobb (American football) =

American football player (born 1990)

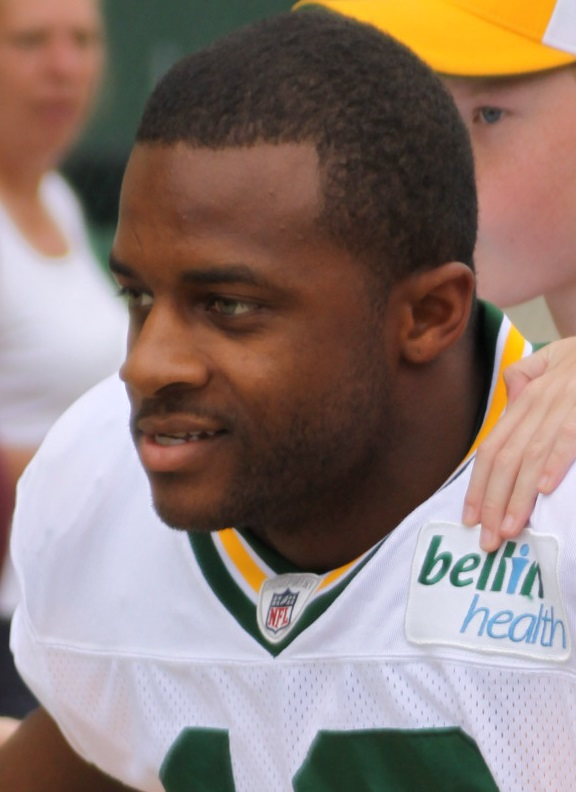
- Cobb with the Green Bay Packers in 2011

No. 18
- Position: Wide receiver

Personal information
- Born: August 22, 1990 (age 36); Maryville, Tennessee, U.S.
- Listed height: 5 ft 10 in (1.78 m)
- Listed weight: 192 lb (87 kg)

Career information
- High school: Alcoa (Alcoa, Tennessee)
- College: Kentucky (2008–2010)
- NFL draft: 2011: 2nd round, 64th overall pick

Career history
- Green Bay Packers (2011–2018); Dallas Cowboys (2019); Houston Texans (2020); Green Bay Packers (2021–2022); New York Jets (2023)

Awards and highlights
- Pro Bowl (2014); PFWA All-Rookie Team (2011); First-team All-American (2010); 2× First-team All-SEC (2009, 2010)

Career NFL statistics
- Receptions: 630
- Receiving yards: 7,624
- Rushing yards: 364
- Return yards: 2,829
- Total touchdowns: 57
- Stats at Pro Football Reference

Randall Ladonald Cobb II (born August 22, 1990) is an American former professional football wide receiver who played 13 seasons in the National Football League (NFL). He played college football for the Kentucky Wildcats, earning All-American honors in 2010. Cobb was selected by the Green Bay Packers in the second round of the 2011 NFL draft. He also played one season each for the Dallas Cowboys, Houston Texans, and New York Jets.

== Early life ==
Cobb was born to Randall Cobb Sr. and Tina Cobb. Randall Sr. worked at the Denso car parts factory in Maryville, Tennessee and also worked side jobs in the evenings, ranging from installing ceramic tile floors to mowing lawns and plowing snow, with young Randall II helping. Tina, who was a track star in high school, later worked at Denso, where she met Randall Sr.

Cobb attended Alcoa High School in Alcoa, Tennessee, where he was a letterman in football, basketball, and track. His football team was a four-time State Champion in Class AA and Cobb received a "Mr. Football" trophy from the Tennessee Secondary School Athletic Association. At that time, Cobb played both offense and defense as well as special teams, but made his biggest impact as quarterback for the Tornadoes. Cobb was an All-District basketball player as a junior, playing for Micah Marsh.

Cobb was also a track star at Alcoa. He was a four-year member of the track team, competing in sprints along with the 4 × 100 m and 4 × 200 m squads. Cobb finished third in the state meet in the 100-meter dash as a senior, recording a career-best time of 10.75 seconds. He was clocked at 21.89 seconds in the 200-meter dash at age 16. Cobb also helped lead the Alcoa 4 × 100 m relay squad to a second-place finish in the state meet as a junior.

== College career ==
Cobb played college football for the University of Kentucky. During his first year, under head coach Rich Brooks, Cobb was named to the SEC All-Freshmen team at quarterback, playing in 11 games and starting four at quarterback. He accounted for 11 touchdowns as a freshman – two passing, two receiving, and seven rushing.

As a sophomore, Cobb played mainly wide receiver as well as a significant role in the offense/special teams returning kicks, place kick holding, receiving, and also quarterback in the "Wildcat" formation. He scored 15 touchdowns – four receiving, one returning, and 10 rushing during the 2009 season. During the season, Cobb had an eight-game streak of scoring a touchdown.

As a junior, Cobb had a new head coach in Joker Phillips, who said: "He's one of the best leaders I've ever been around." Cobb scored a touchdown on a punt return against Western Kentucky. On October 9, 2010, he scored four touchdowns against undefeated and eventual national champions Auburn, tying the Kentucky school record for career touchdowns at 32. Cobb was also the first player to score a rushing, passing, and receiving touchdown in the same game for Kentucky since Shane Boyd in 2003. Overall, in his junior season, Cobb finished with 84 receptions for 1,017 yards and seven touchdowns to go along with 55 carries for 424 yards and five touchdowns. He also threw for 58 yards and three touchdowns. After his junior season, Cobb declared for the NFL Draft.

While at Kentucky, Cobb majored in community communications and leadership development.

== Professional career ==
External videos
- Cobb's NFL Combine workout
- Cobb gets drafted by Green Bay

Pre-draft measurables
Height	Weight	Arm length	Hand span	Wingspan	40-yard dash	10-yard split	20-yard split	20-yard shuttle	Three-cone drill	Vertical jump	Broad jump	Bench press	Wonderlic
5 ft 10 1/4 in (1.78 m)	191 lb (87 kg)	31 in (0.79 m)	9 3/8 in (0.24 m)	6 ft 1 3/8 in (1.86 m)	4.46 s	1.60 s	2.66 s	4.34 s	7.08 s	33.5 in (0.85 m)	9 ft 7 in (2.92 m)	16 reps	25
All values are from NFL Combine

=== Green Bay Packers (first stint) ===
==== 2011 season ====
The Green Bay Packers selected Cobb in the second round (64th overall) of the 2011 NFL draft. Cobb was the seventh wide receiver drafted in 2011.

On July 29, 2011, the Packers signed Cobb to a four-year, $3.20 million contract that included $1 million guaranteed and a signing bonus of $834,124.

On September 8, 2011, in the Packers' opening game of the season against the New Orleans Saints, Cobb became the first person born in the 1990s to play in the NFL. He recorded his first NFL touchdown on a 32-yard reception in the first quarter, and followed up with a 108-yard kickoff return in the third quarter that tied the record set by Ellis Hobbs of the New England Patriots in 2007 for longest kickoff return in NFL history. The return was later named Play of the Year at the season-ending NFL Honors banquet.

In a Monday Night Football game against the Minnesota Vikings on November 14, Cobb scored his second special teams touchdown of the year on an 80-yard punt return in the first quarter. With that, Cobb became the first rookie in Packers history to return both a kick and a punt for a touchdown in the same season. For the season, he caught 25 passes for 375 yards (a 15.0 average) and one touchdown. His most impressive statistics were on special teams, as he returned 34 kicks for 941 yards (a 27.7 average) and one touchdown and 26 punt returns for 295 yards (an 11.3 average) and one touchdown.

Cobb made his playoff debut in the Divisional Round against the New York Giants. He had three receptions for 38 yards in the 37–20 loss.

==== 2012 season ====
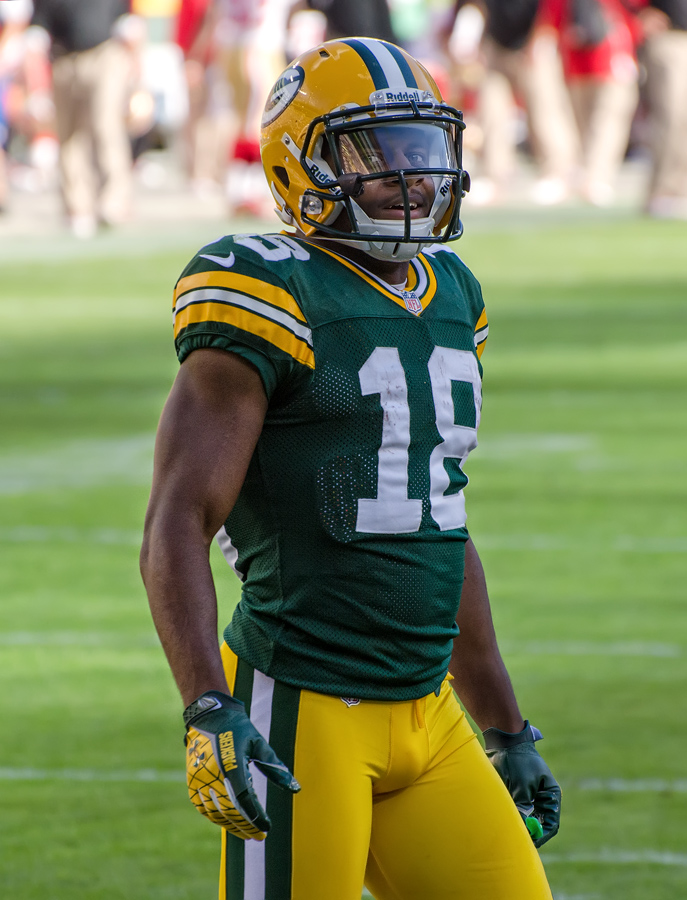
Cobb in 2012

In Week 6, against the Houston Texans, Cobb had seven receptions for 102 yards for his first career 100-yard game in the 42–24 victory. In the 2012 season, he played in 15 games including eight starts. Cobb led the team in receptions with 80 and receiving yards with 954 and was second on the team with eight touchdowns. He set a single-season franchise record with 2,342 combined net yards—954 receiving, 132 rushing, 964 on kickoff returns (a 25.4 average), and 292 on punt returns (a 9.4 average) including one touchdown. Cobb led the NFL in that category. He was named a Pro Bowl first alternate as a kick returner.

==== 2013 season ====
In 2013, Cobb was limited to six games (including four starts) due to a broken fibula injury suffered in Week 6 against the Baltimore Ravens. He returned to play in the regular season finale against the Chicago Bears at Soldier Field. He caught a memorable 48-yard game-winning touchdown pass from Aaron Rodgers late in the fourth quarter to win the NFC North title for the Packers. He finished with 31 receptions for 433 receiving yards and four receiving touchdowns.

==== 2014 season ====
In Week 4, Cobb had seven receptions for 113 yards and two touchdowns in a 38–17 victory over the Bears. Three weeks later against the Carolina Panthers, he had six receptions for 121 yards and a touchdown in the 38–17 victory. In the next game against the Saints, Cobb had five receptions for 126 yards and a touchdown during the 44–23 loss. In Week 11, he had season-highs with 10 receptions and 129 receiving yards against the Philadelphia Eagles. During Week 16 against the Tampa Bay Buccaneers, Cobb had 11 receptions for 131 yards in the 20–3 victory. On January 19, he was named as a replacement for Dez Bryant in the Pro Bowl.

Cobb finished the season with 91 receptions for 1,287 yards and 12 touchdowns. He had a six-game touchdown streak and had five games going over 100 yards on the year. The Packers finished with a 12–4 record and earned a first-round bye as the #2-seed in the NFC. In the Divisional Round, against the Dallas Cowboys, Cobb had eight receptions for 116 yards during the 26–21 victory. In the NFC Championship Game against the Seattle Seahawks, he had seven receptions for 62 yards and a touchdown during the 28–22 overtime road loss. Cobb was ranked as the 100th best player in the NFL by his fellow players on the NFL Top 100 Players of 2014.

==== 2015 season ====
On March 7, 2015, the Packers signed Cobb to a four-year, $40 million contract with a signing bonus of $13 million. After signing the deal, Cobb explained his thought process by saying: "At the end of the day, my heart was in Green Bay, and I knew that's where I wanted to be. I knew I had a good thing going for me, and still I signed a pretty lucrative deal that I can handle as far as making that last for the rest of my life." Cobb also mentioned that the NFC Championship loss to the Seattle Seahawks still bothered him. "Obviously, that loss still hurts. It still feels fresh. I want to win a championship, and we were right there. We were close. We didn't do what we needed to do to win, but we have a lot of the guys coming back this year, same guys. A lot of our core guys, and we believe that puts us in the mix. So we have to handle business this offseason as far as continuing to get better on a daily basis. Obviously, next season, we have to put ourselves in position to go on a run."

In 2015, Cobb had one of his best seasons as teammate Jordy Nelson went down with an ACL in the preseason. In Week 2, against the Seahawks, he had eight receptions for 116 yards in the 27–17 victory. In the following game, Cobb had three receiving touchdowns in the 38–28 victory over the Kansas City Chiefs. In Week 13, during the "Miracle in Motown" win, Cobb recovered a James Starks fumble to give the Packers their first touchdown of the game to make the score 20–7 in favor of the Detroit Lions. The Packers would win 27–23 after a Rodgers to Rodgers Hail Mary.

Cobb finished the season with 79 receptions for 829 yards and six touchdowns. During the Wild Card Round against the Washington Redskins, he scored a receiving touchdown in the 35–18 road victory.

==== 2016 season ====
On September 16, 2016, Cobb was fined $9,115 for pulling the face mask of linebacker Paul Posluszny in Week 1 against the Jacksonville Jaguars. Cobb finished the season with 60 receptions on 84 targets for 610 yards and four touchdowns. In the Wild Card Round against the Giants, Cobb had five receptions for 116 yards and three touchdowns, including catching a 42-yard Hail Mary from Aaron Rodgers at the end of the second quarter.

==== 2017 season ====
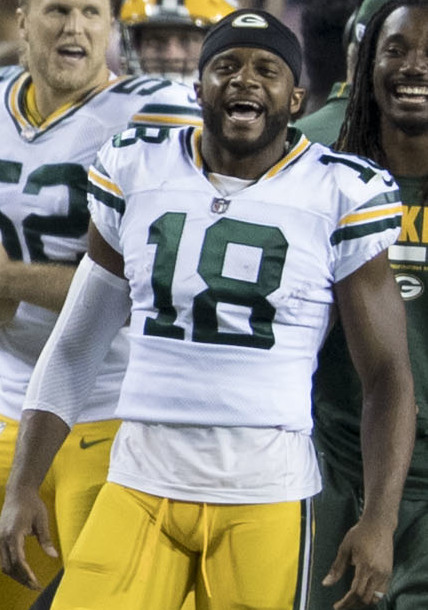
Cobb in 2017

In the 2017 season, Cobb finished with 66 receptions for 653 yards and four touchdowns despite losing starting quarterback Aaron Rodgers. For the first time in his professional career, the Packers finished with a 7–9 record and did not make the playoffs.

==== 2018 season ====
On September 9, 2018, Cobb caught nine passes for 142 yards and a touchdown in the season-opener against the Bears. He recorded a career-long 75-yard touchdown reception late in the fourth quarter to give the Packers the go-ahead score in the 24–23 victory. This game marked his 15th career game with at least 100 receiving yards. After two games with four receptions each, Cobb suffered a hamstring injury and missed the next five weeks, appearing for limited duty in Week 8 and Week 9 (for a total of nine receptions). Overall, he finished the 2018 season with 38 receptions for 383 receiving yards and two receiving touchdowns.

=== Dallas Cowboys ===
On March 19, 2019, the Cowboys signed Cobb to a one-year, $5 million contract that includes a signing bonus of $2 million, to be the team's slot wide receiver. Cobb caught his first touchdown with the Cowboys in the first week of the 2019 season with 9:48 left in the third quarter in their home opener against the Giants. Cobb finished the game with four catches for 69 yards and a touchdown in the 35–17 win.

In Week 10 against the Vikings on Sunday Night Football, Cobb caught six passes for 106 yards and a touchdown in the 28–24 loss. During Week 11 against the Lions, Cobb finished with four receptions for 115 receiving yards and a touchdown as the Cowboys won 35–27. Overall, Cobb finished the 2019 season with 55 receptions for 828 receiving yards and three receiving touchdowns.

=== Houston Texans ===
On April 1, 2020, the Houston Texans signed Cobb to a three-year, $27 million contract that included $18 million guaranteed and a signing bonus of $6 million. He was brought in to be the team's slot wide receiver and help the team offset the loss of DeAndre Hopkins.

In Week 3 against the Pittsburgh Steelers, Cobb caught four passes for 95 yards and his first touchdown reception as a Texan during the 28–21 loss. In Week 7 against his former team, the Packers, Cobb recorded eight catches for 95 yards during the 35–20 loss. He was placed on injured reserve on November 25, 2020, after suffering a toe injury in Week 11. Cobb finished the 2020 season with 38 receptions for 441 receiving yards and three receiving touchdowns.

=== Green Bay Packers (second stint) ===
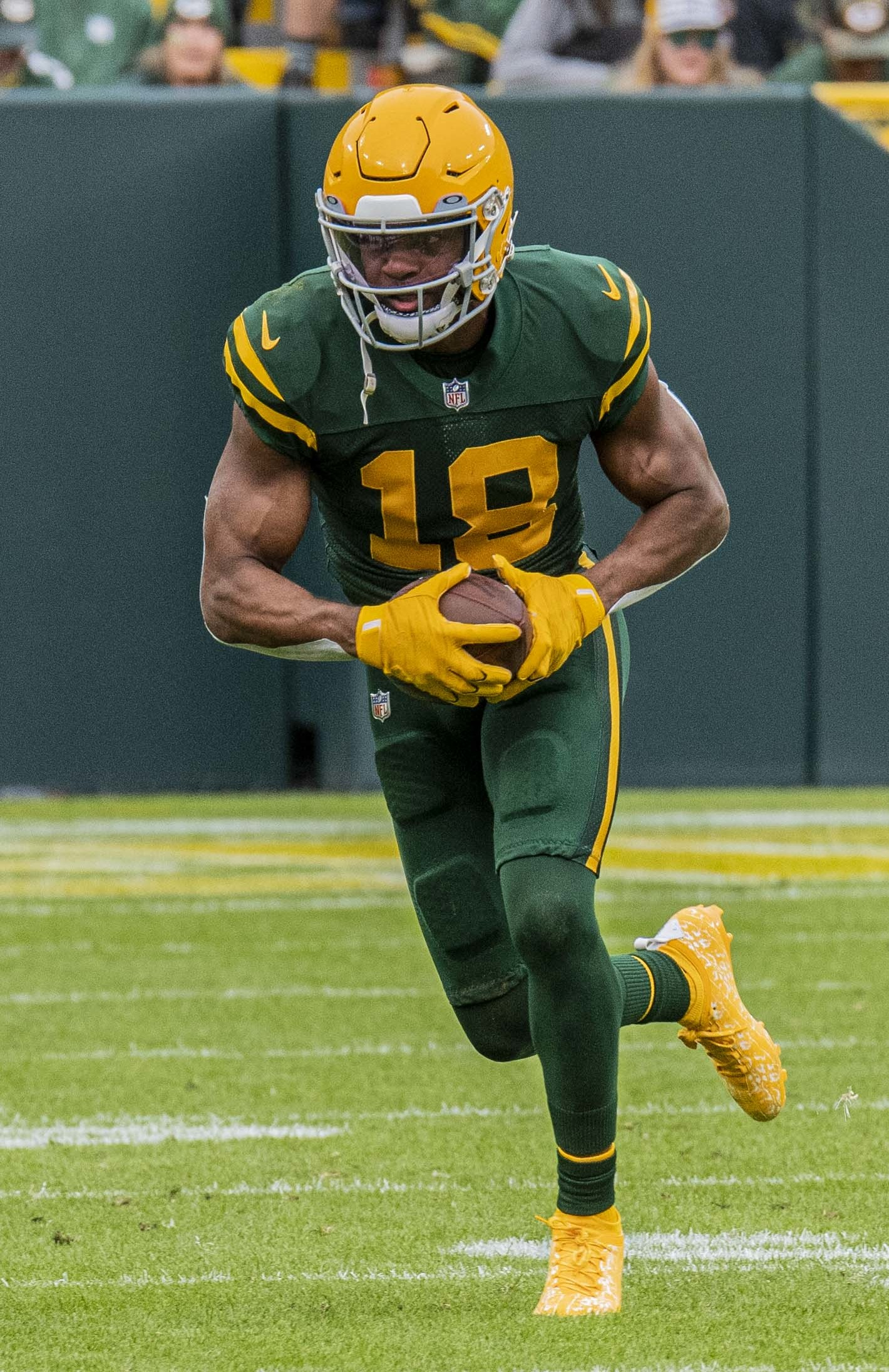
Cobb in 2021

On July 28, 2021, the Packers traded for Cobb at the request of his close friend and former teammate, Aaron Rodgers. Houston traded the rights to Cobb – and most of his salary obligations – to the Packers in exchange for a sixth-round draft pick. He sustained an injury on a touchdown catch during a Week 12 win over the Los Angeles Rams, and was deemed questionable to return to the game. He was placed on injured reserve on December 11. Head coach Matt LaFleur announced on January 19 that he had been cleared to return for the Packers' Divisional Round playoff game against the San Francisco 49ers where they lost on a last second field goal. Cobb finished the 2021 season with 28 receptions for 375 yards and five touchdowns.

On October 22, 2022, Cobb was placed on injured reserve after suffering an ankle injury in Week 6. On November 17, 2022, Cobb was activated from injured reserve. In the 2022 season, Cobb appeared in 13 games and started three. He finished with 34 receptions for 417 yards and a touchdown.

=== New York Jets ===
On May 3, 2023, Cobb signed with the New York Jets, following Aaron Rodgers to his new team. Cobb was placed on the Active/physically unable to perform list on July 19, 2023. He scored his lone touchdown of the season in Week 14 against the Texans.

== Career statistics ==
=== NFL ===
==== Regular season ====
Year	Team	Games		Receiving					Fumbles	
Year	Team	GP	GS	Rec	Yds	Avg	Lng	TD	Fum	Lost
2011	GB	15	0	25	375	15.0	61	1	3	3
2012	GB	15	8	80	954	11.9	39	8	4	1
2013	GB	6	4	31	433	14.0	48	4	0	0
2014	GB	16	16	91	1,287	14.1	70	12	3	2
2015	GB	16	15	79	829	10.5	53	6	1	0
2016	GB	13	10	60	610	10.2	47	4	1	0
2017	GB	15	14	66	653	9.9	46	4	1	0
2018	GB	9	6	38	383	10.1	75	2	2	1
2019	DAL	15	6	55	828	15.1	59	3	2	1
2020	HOU	10	2	38	441	11.6	34	3	0	0
2021	GB	12	3	28	375	13.4	54	5	1	1
2022	GB	13	3	34	417	12.3	40	1	1	0
2023	NYJ	11	1	5	39	7.8	15	1	0	0
Total		166	88	630	7,624	12.1	75	54	19	9

==== Postseason ====
Year	Team	Games		Receiving					Fumbles	
Year	Team	GP	GS	Rec	Yds	Avg	Lng	TD	Fum	Lost
2011	GB	1	0	3	38	12.7	21	0	0	0
2012	GB	2	2	6	31	5.2	8	0	1	1
2013	GB	1	1	2	51	25.5	26	0	0	0
2014	GB	2	2	15	178	11.9	31	1	1	1
2015	GB	2	2	3	38	12.7	15	1	0	0
2016	GB	3	3	18	260	14.4	42	3	0	0
2021	GB	1	0	0	0	0.0	0	0	0	0
Total		12	10	47	596	12.7	42	5	2	2

=== College ===
Season	Team	Conf	Class	Pos	GP	Rushing				Receiving				Scrimmage			
Season	Team	Conf	Class	Pos	GP	Att	Yds	Avg	TD	Rec	Yds	Avg	TD	Plays	Yds	Avg	TD
2008	Kentucky	SEC	FR	QB	11	79	316	4.0	7	21	197	9.4	2	100	513	5.1	9
2009	Kentucky	SEC	SO	WR	12	94	573	6.1	10	39	447	11.5	4	133	1,020	7.7	14
2010	Kentucky	SEC	JR	WR	13	55	424	7.7	5	84	1,017	12.1	7	139	1,441	10.4	12
Career					36	228	1,313	5.8	22	144	1,661	11.5	13	372	2,974	8.0	35

== Post-playing career ==
On July 18, 2024, Cobb announced that he joined the SEC Network as a studio analyst. The same day, Cobb stated that he would be willing to return to playing football if the right opportunity arises.

== Personal life ==
Cobb and his wife, Aiyda, have two sons, Caspian and Cade. Cobb made his longtime NFL teammate, Aaron Rodgers, the godfather of Cade.

In August 2023, it was announced that Cobb's wife was pregnant with their third child. Son Chance was born in 2024.

Cobb is the cousin of NFL players Shannon Mitchell and Billy Williams.
