= Millennium Manor =

Coordinates: 35.780°N 83.965°W

Millennium Manor Castle is a house in Alcoa, Tennessee. It was built from June 1937 to December, 1946, by William Andrew Nicholson and his wife Emma Fair MacArthur Nicholson, who had moved to Alcoa, from Pickens County, Georgia, where William was a mason and carpenter. In 1937 he got a job with the Alcoa plant as a replacement for striking workers. Nicholson started construction of Millennium Manor Castle at the age of 61 while maintaining a full-time job at the Alcoa plant across the street.

The Nicholsons designed the building using Roman architectural techniques, and intended Millennium Manor Castle to survive for hundreds of years, including the passing of Armageddon, which they believed would occur in 1969. The house was listed on the National Register of Historic Places in 2020.

== Construction ==
All work was done by the Nicholsons without the aid of machines, a remarkable feat since both were thin and small of stature. The Nicholsons did not belong to a church in Tennessee, but they were very religious people who believed in a literal interpretation of Revelation 20:6 ("Blessed and holy is he that hath part in the first resurrection. Over such the second death has no power, but they shall be priests of God and Christ, and shall reign with him a thousand years.")

Millennium Manor Castle was built to survive Armageddon and a thousand years beyond. Millennium Manor was built using Roman architecture which can still be seen standing in structures after more than 2,000 years. The light colored stone of Millennium Manor is Tennessee Pink Marble found in nearby Friendsville, Tennessee. The "Arch and Keystone" visible over doors and windows continues throughout the entire house, including the floor and roof. First built was a wooden form, shaped like the inside of the building. A rubber tarp was laid over this form. Stone was stacked on top of the form and a "Keystone" inserted. (At this point in the construction, the wooden form could have been pulled completely out, and the roof would still stand on its own without any mortar). Cement was poured over the stacked marble rock, and the cement sifted through to the rubber tarp and hardened. Wrinkles from the rubber sheet can still be seen on the inside ceiling. The form was then removed, at which point that part of the roof (or floor) was finished. In theory, it should be possible to remove all cement from the entire building and have it continue to stand, since the only function of the mortar was to fill gaps and not to bear a load.

Over 4,000 bags of cement were used, and in some places agricultural lime was used instead of sand for less water seepage. The thinnest inside wall is 19 inches (480 mm). The thinnest outside wall is 25 inches (640 mm). The roof is greater than 3 feet (0.91 m) thick, and the floor is greater than 4 feet (1.2 m) thick. The roof alone supposedly weighs 423 tons. All walls are load bearing. There are 14 rooms and a two-car underground garage, for a total of about 3,000 square feet (280 m^{2}) under roof. The upstairs has 7 chimney flues. A six-story deep well is 5 feet (1.5 m) in diameter. In November 1943, Wright Road was widened, and William Nicholson was forced to tear down the entire wall facing the street. He promptly rebuilt it 6 feet (1.8 m) further back. The Castle sits on 6 lots equaling about an acre, and another 1/2 acre next door has been leased. A small white frame house that currently sits on the back lot originally was next to the Castle. It was a "kit home" built to give the Nicholsons a place to live until the main building was finished. It was then moved to its present location.

In 1950 Emma Fair MacArthur Nicholson died of cancer at age 72. The Nicholsons had been married over 50 years. William Nicholson was quoted as saying, "It was hard to be parted from her after so many years. My wife believed in me but her faith in eternal life was weak. She tried to believe, but she had her doubts. There came times when she talked of dying." Fifteen years later, at the age of 88 and nearly blind and deaf, William died, and was buried alongside his wife in Clarks Grove Cemetery. The day before William went to the hospital he told the pastor from the church next-door to the Castle that "if God doesn't intervene soon, I will die."

== Current state ==
The Nicholsons left 10 children, but none came to live in the stone house after William Nicholson's death. Soon vandals had stolen or broken everything inside. Juanita Shaw and her son bought the building to use as a meeting place for the "Odd Fellows," as a rental property, and as a "Haunted House" for the "Jaycees." Millennium Manor was later purchased on February 21, 1995 at auction for $39,000 by Dean Fontaine.

The renovation is an ongoing process. Fontaine completes all work himself, when not working as a Knoxville firefighter and paramedic. Among many of the projects in the works, the gazebo was planned to be reconstructed in the spring/summer of 2011.

This is a private residence, but each Memorial Day, Fontaine holds an Open House tour. Rentals may be available, at the owner's discretion.
