= Marmion Academy =

Private school in Aurora, Illinois, US

Location
- 1000 Butterfield Road; Aurora, Illinois 60502; United States; 41°48′52″N 88°17′41″W

Information
- Former name: Marmion Military Academy
- Type: Private, Day, College-prep
- Motto: Credere Deo Luctari Pro Eo (To believe in God and fight for Him)
- Religious affiliation: Roman Catholic
- Patron saint: Blessed Don Columba Marmion
- Established: 1933
- Sister school: Rosary High School
- Oversight: Roman Catholic Diocese of Rockford
- President: Abbot Joel Rippinger, OSB
- Head of school: Anthony Tinerella
- Faculty: 76
- Grades: 9–12
- Gender: Boys (-2026) Coed (2026-)
- Enrollment: 532 (2017)
- Average class size: 20
- Student to teacher ratio: 14:1
- Campus size: 325 acres (1.32 km^{2})
- Campus type: Suburban
- Colors: Red and blue
- Fight song: Marmion Loyalty
- Athletics conference: Chicago Catholic League, Girls Catholic Athletic Conference
- Mascot: The Cadets
- Team name: Cadets
- Accreditation: North Central Association of Colleges and Schools
- Newspaper: The Cadet Call
- Yearbook: Red and Blue Review
- Tuition: $15,300.00 (2024-2025)
- Affiliation: Benedictine
- Website: www.marmion.org/academy

Marmion Academy (formerly Marmion Military Academy) is a coeducational 9–12 Roman Catholic high school in Aurora, Illinois, United States. It is in the Roman Catholic Diocese of Rockford.

The academy is owned and operated by the Benedictine monks of Marmion Abbey on campus. The leadership formation programs include: Leadership Education and Development (LEAD) program and a United States Army Junior Reserve Officers' Training Corps (JROTC) program that has been a part of the academy since its early years, but was not a part of the school in the inaugural year of 1933–34.

The school is a part of the Chicago Catholic League.

== History ==
Marmion Academy was founded in 1933 when the monks of St. Meinrad Abbey combined Jasper Academy (Jasper, Indiana) with the Fox Valley Catholic High School, which the Augustinians had just returned to the diocese of Rockford. During the Great Depression era, it was difficult for students to pay their tuition as well as to buy uniforms, so the monks, in 1935, associated with the JROTC program and changed its name to Marmion Military Academy. At the time, all JROTC uniforms were provided for by the US government. In the 1990s, in order to provide more options for its student body and a return to the original spirit of the school, the monks of Marmion Abbey decided to make JROTC an optional program and to reinstitute the original name of the school, Marmion Academy.

At one point, there were two campuses: one for residential students and one for day students. The two merged back into the Butterfield Road campus, which had been the residential campus. In early 2002, the school decided to close its residential program and started to expand its student body.

In sports, the Marmion Cadets have been successful. In 2000, the Marmion swim team captured the school's first state championship, along with a 3rd place in 1998, 2nd in 1999, and 3rd in 2001. Later that decade, the 2010 Marmion Cadets placed 2nd in the state in the 6A State Championship for football and 3rd in the Cross Country Class 2A State Championships. In 2017, the Marmion Cadets baseball team finished 3rd in the 3A State Finals. Just a year later, the Cadets captured their 2nd state championship in school history as the track and field team won the 2018 Class 2A State Championship.

In 2024, the school announced it would be switching to a coeducational model by the 2026-27 school year. The school welcomed its first class of 45 girls in 2026.

== Academics ==
Graduation Requirements:

Marmion requires that each graduate complete 4 credits each in English and Theology; 3 credits in Mathematics; 3 elective credits; 2 credits each in a Foreign Language (4 credits recommended), Science, Social Studies, and either Military Science (JROTC) or Leadership Education and Development (LEAD); and 1 credit each in Health/Physical Education; and ½ credit in Music and Art. Marmion students are required to perform at least 15 hours of community service each academic year. The GPA is based on a 5.67 Scale.

At least 23¼ credits are required for graduation.

== Leadership programs ==
Marmion has two leadership programs, LEAD (Leadership Education and Development) and JROTC (Junior Reserve Officer Training Corps). The LEAD program was started in 1994, while the JROTC has been a part of the school since 1935.

== Notable alumni ==
- Brad Childress, former NFL coach
- Larry English, former NFL linebacker
- Graham Glasgow, NFL offensive lineman (Detroit Lions)
- Jordan Glasgow, NFL linebacker
- Ryan Glasgow, former NFL defensive tackle
- Chick Hearn, former play-by-play announcer for the Los Angeles Lakers
- Ben Kanute, triathlete who competed at the 2016 Summer Olympics
- James D. Oberweis, former Illinois state senator, owner of Oberweis Dairy
- Daniel P. Ward, former Chief Justice of the Illinois Supreme Court

== Notable staff ==
- George Ireland is a former head basketball coach. He later coached the Loyola University men's basketball team to the 1963 NCAA Championship.
