= Dave Davis (American football) =

American football player (born 1948)

No. 47, 85, 69
- Position: Wide receiver

Personal information
- Born: July 5, 1948 (age 78); Alcoa, Tennessee, U.S.
- Listed height: 6 ft 0 in (1.83 m)
- Listed weight: 175 lb (79 kg)

Career information
- High school: Alcoa (Alcoa, Tennessee)
- College: Tennessee State
- NFL draft: 1971: 7th round, 168th overall pick

Career history
- Green Bay Packers (1971–1972); Pittsburgh Steelers (1973); New Orleans Saints (1974)

Career NFL statistics
- Receptions: 11
- Receiving yards: 192
- Kick returns: 2
- Punt returns: 6
- Total return yards: 72
- Total TDs: 1
- Stats at Pro Football Reference

Dave Davis (born David Glenn Davis; July 5, 1948) is a former wide receiver in the National Football League (NFL). Davis was selected by the Green Bay Packers in the seventh round of the 1971 NFL draft. He played two seasons with the team. He later played with the Pittsburgh Steelers and the New Orleans Saints.
