= Earl Goodwin =

American football player (1901–1976)

Profile
- Position: Tight end

Personal information
- Born: January 21, 1901; Paducah, Texas
- Died: July 1, 1976; Durango, Colorado
- Listed height: 6 ft 1 in (1.85 m)
- Listed weight: 195 lb (88 kg)

Career information
- College: West Texas A&M University, Bucknell University

Career history
- Pottsville Maroons (1928)
- Stats at Pro Football Reference

Earl Goodwin (January 21, 1901 – July 1, 1976) was a professional football player from Paducah, Texas. After going to high school in Colorado, Goodwin attended Bucknell University and West Texas A&M University. Goodwin made his National Football League debut in 1928 with the Pottsville Maroons. He would go on to play eight games for the Maroons. He played both college and professional football with his twin brother, Myrl by his side.
