= Mark Flythe =

American football player (born 1968)

No. 95
- Position: Defensive end

Personal information
- Born: October 4, 1968 (age 58); Philadelphia, Pennsylvania, U.S.
- Listed height: 6 ft 7 in (2.01 m)
- Listed weight: 270 lb (122 kg)

Career information
- High school: West Windsor-Plainsboro
- College: Penn State
- NFL draft: 1992: undrafted

Career history
- Denver Broncos (1992)*; New York Giants (1993)
- * Offseason or practice squad member only
- Stats at Pro Football Reference

Mark Lloyd Flythe (born October 4, 1968) is an American former professional football player who was a defensive end for the New York Giants of the National Football League (NFL). He played college football for the Penn State Nittany Lions.
