= Myrl Goodwin =

American football player (1901–1979)

Earl Goodwin
Profile
- Positions: Tight end, Fullback, quarterback

Personal information
- Born: January 21, 1901; Paducah, Texas
- Died: February 14, 1979 (aged 78); Sparks, Nevada
- Listed height: 6 ft 1 in (1.85 m)
- Listed weight: 195 lb (88 kg)

Career information
- College: West Texas A&M University, Bucknell University

Career history
- Pottsville Maroons (1928)
- Stats at Pro Football Reference

Myrl Goodwin (January 21, 1901 - February 14, 1979) was a professional football player from Paducah, Texas. After going to high school in Colorado, Goodwin attended Bucknell University and West Texas A&M University. Goodwin made his National Football League debut in 1928 with the Pottsville Maroons. He would go on to play three games for the Maroons. He played both college and professional football with his twin brother, Earl by his side.
