= Jordan Glasgow =

American football player (born 1996)

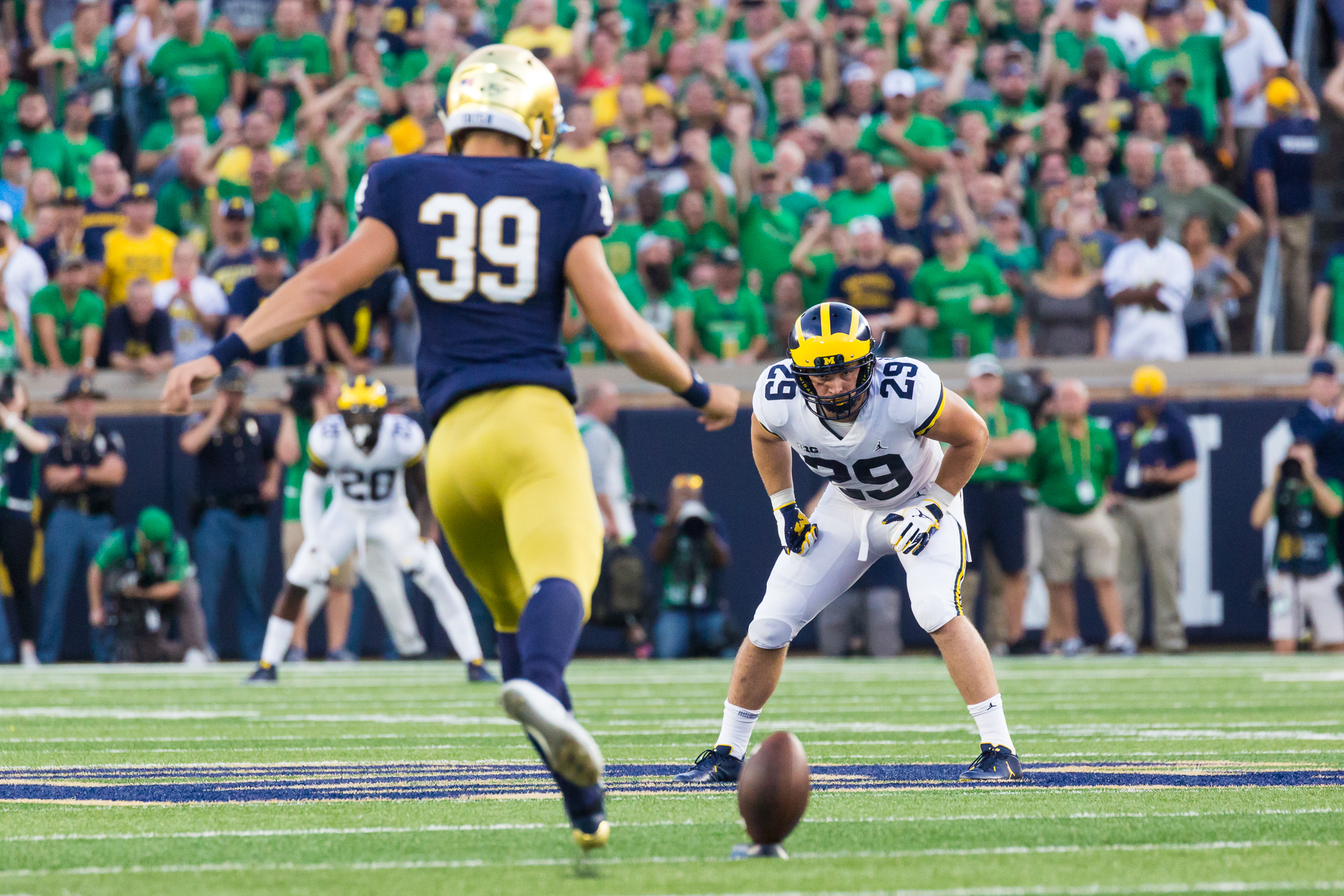
- Glasgow (right) with the Michigan Wolverines in 2018

No. 59
- Position: Linebacker

Personal information
- Born: June 28, 1996 (age 30); DeKalb, Illinois, U.S.
- Listed height: 6 ft 0 in (1.83 m)
- Listed weight: 225 lb (102 kg)

Career information
- High school: Marmion Academy (Aurora, Illinois)
- College: Michigan (2015–2019)
- NFL draft: 2020: 6th round, 213th overall pick

Career history
- Indianapolis Colts (2020–2021)

Awards and highlights
- PFWA All-Rookie Team (2020)

Career NFL statistics
- Total tackles: 15
- Stats at Pro Football Reference

Jordan Glasgow (born June 28, 1996) is an American former professional football player who was a linebacker for the Indianapolis Colts of the National Football League (NFL). He played college football for the Michigan Wolverines, and is the younger brother of Ryan and Graham Glasgow.

== College career ==
After starting his career as a walk-on at the University of Michigan, Glasgow earned a scholarship due to his play on special teams and moved into the starting lineup at linebacker for his senior season.

== Professional career ==
Pre-draft measurables
Height	Weight	Arm length	Hand span
6 ft 0 1/4 in (1.84 m)	221 lb (100 kg)	30 5/8 in (0.78 m)	9 5/8 in (0.24 m)
All values from Pro Day

Glasgow was selected by the Indianapolis Colts in the sixth round (213th overall) in the 2020 NFL draft. He was named to the 2020 PFWA All-Rookie Team for his role on special teams. During the season, he was placed on the reserve/COVID-19 list by the team on December 13, 2020, and activated on December 29. He was named to the PFWA All-Rookie Team.

On September 24, 2021, Glasgow was placed on injured reserve with a concussion. He was activated on October 30. Glasgow was waived on June 9, 2022.

== Personal life ==
Glasgow is the youngest brother of Graham Glasgow and Ryan Glasgow, both whom also played for Michigan and in the NFL.
