= Ryan Glasgow =

American football player (born 1993)

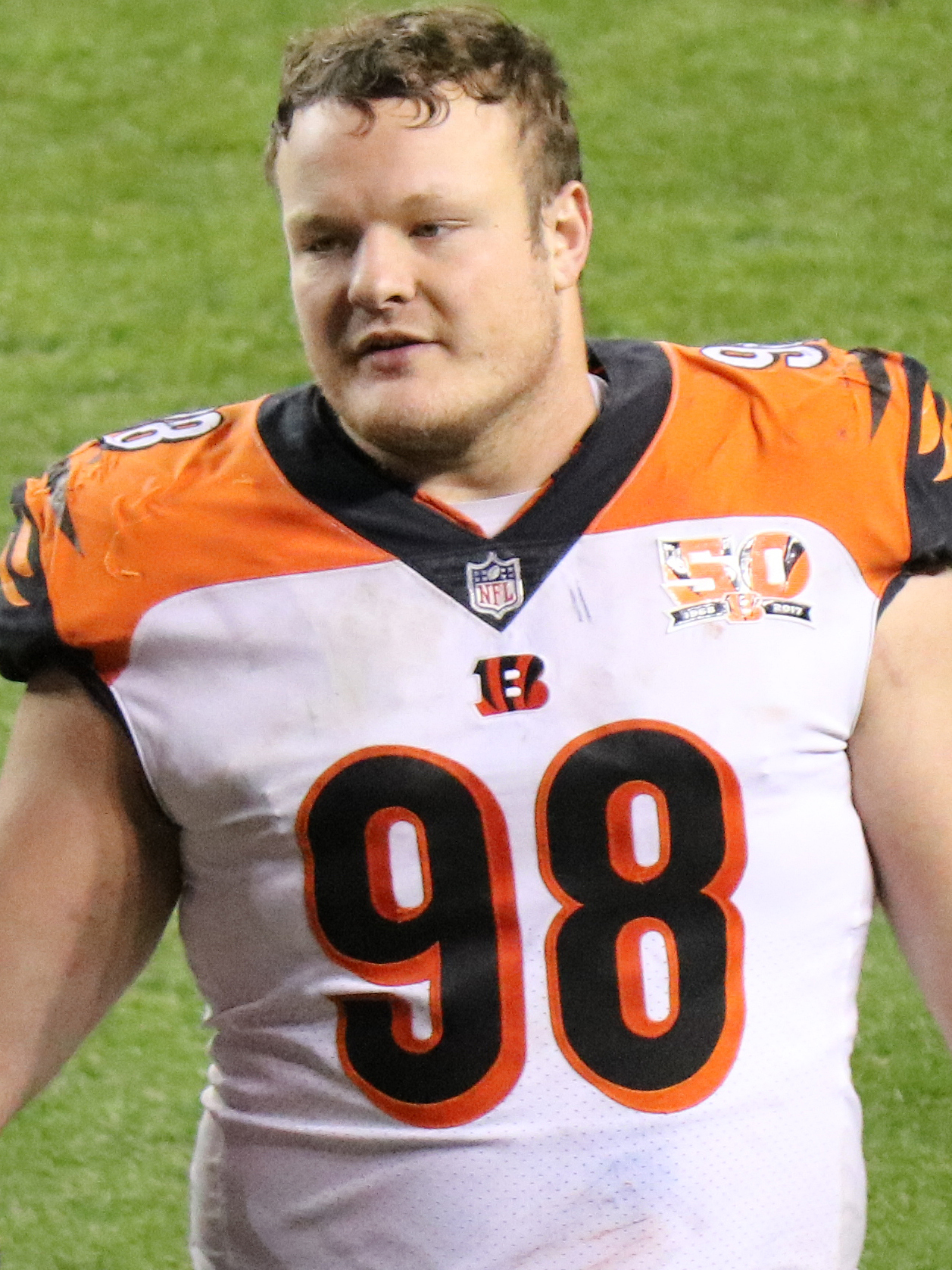
- Glasgow with the Cincinnati Bengals in 2017

No. 98, 97, 63, 95
- Position: Defensive tackle

Personal information
- Born: September 30, 1993 (age 33); DeKalb, Illinois, U.S.
- Listed height: 6 ft 3 in (1.91 m)
- Listed weight: 300 lb (136 kg)

Career information
- High school: Marmion Academy (Aurora, Illinois)
- College: Michigan
- NFL draft: 2017: 4th round, 138th overall pick

Career history
- Cincinnati Bengals (2017–2019); Houston Texans (2020)*; New England Patriots (2020)*; New Orleans Saints (2020)
- * Offseason or practice squad member only

Awards and highlights
- Second-team All-Big Ten (2016)

Career NFL statistics
- Total tackles: 44
- Fumble recoveries: 1
- Stats at Pro Football Reference

Ryan James Glasgow (born September 30, 1993) is an American former professional football player who was a defensive tackle in the National Football League (NFL). He played college football for the Michigan Wolverines.

== College career ==
Glasgow played in 45 games at defensive tackle for the Wolverines, starting 33, and recorded 91 tackles, 18.5 for loss, and five sacks. Following the 2016 season, Glasgow was named to the All-Big Ten Conference defensive second-team by both coaches and the media.

== Professional career ==
Pre-draft measurables
Height	Weight	Arm length	Hand span	Wingspan	40-yard dash	10-yard split	20-yard split	20-yard shuttle	Three-cone drill	Vertical jump	Broad jump	Bench press
6 ft 2 7/8 in (1.90 m)	302 lb (137 kg)	33 3/8 in (0.85 m)	9 5/8 in (0.24 m)	6 ft 6 3/8 in (1.99 m)	5.13 s	1.85 s	3.01 s	4.50 s	7.55 s	27.5 in (0.70 m)	8 ft 9 in (2.67 m)	24 reps
All values from NFL Combine/Pro Day

=== Cincinnati Bengals ===
Glasgow was selected by the Cincinnati Bengals in the fourth round, 138th overall, in the 2017 NFL draft.

In Week 3 of the 2018 season, Glasgow was carted to the locker room with an apparent knee injury. The next day, he was diagnosed with a torn ACL and was ruled out for the rest of the season.

On October 30, 2019, Glasgow was placed on injured reserve with a knee injury.

On July 28, 2020, Glasgow was waived by the Bengals with a failed physical designation.

=== Houston Texans ===
On September 28, 2020, Glasgow was signed to the practice squad of the Houston Texans. He was released on October 20.

=== New England Patriots ===
On November 4, 2020, Glasgow was signed to the New England Patriots' practice squad. Glasgow was released by the Patriots on November 10.

=== New Orleans Saints ===
On November 17, 2020, Glasgow was signed to the New Orleans Saints' practice squad. He was elevated to the active roster on November 21 and November 28 for the team's Weeks 11 and 12 games against the Atlanta Falcons and Denver Broncos, and reverted to the practice squad after each game. On January 18, 2021, Glasgow signed a reserve/futures contract with the Saints. He announced his retirement from the NFL on August 7.

== Personal life ==
Glasgow's older brother, Graham, is a guard for the Detroit Lions, while his younger brother, Jordan, was a linebacker for the Indianapolis Colts.
