= Graham Glasgow =

American football player (born 1992)

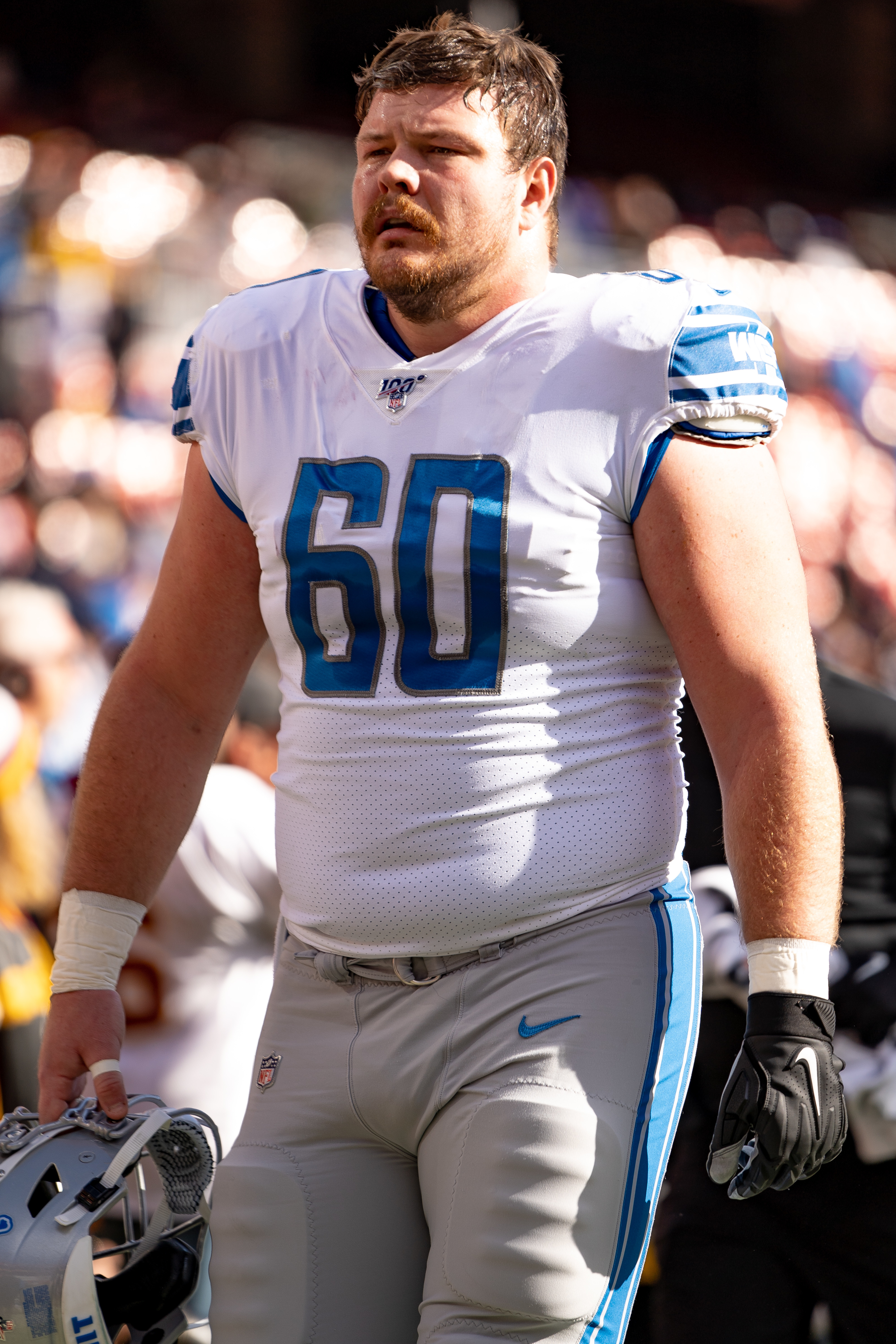
- Glasgow with the Detroit Lions in 2019

Profile
- Position: Center

Personal information
- Born: August 19, 1992 (age 34); DeKalb, Illinois, U.S.
- Listed height: 6 ft 6 in (1.98 m)
- Listed weight: 315 lb (143 kg)

Career information
- High school: Marmion (Aurora, Illinois)
- College: Michigan (2011–2015)
- NFL draft: 2016: 3rd round, 95th overall pick

Career history
- Detroit Lions (2016–2019); Denver Broncos (2020–2022); Detroit Lions (2023–2025)

Career NFL statistics as of 2025
- Games played: 147
- Games started: 136
- Stats at Pro Football Reference

Graham Michael Glasgow (born August 19, 1992) is an American professional football center. He played college football for the Michigan Wolverines, and was selected by the Detroit Lions in the third round of the 2016 NFL draft. He has previously played for the Denver Broncos.

== College career ==
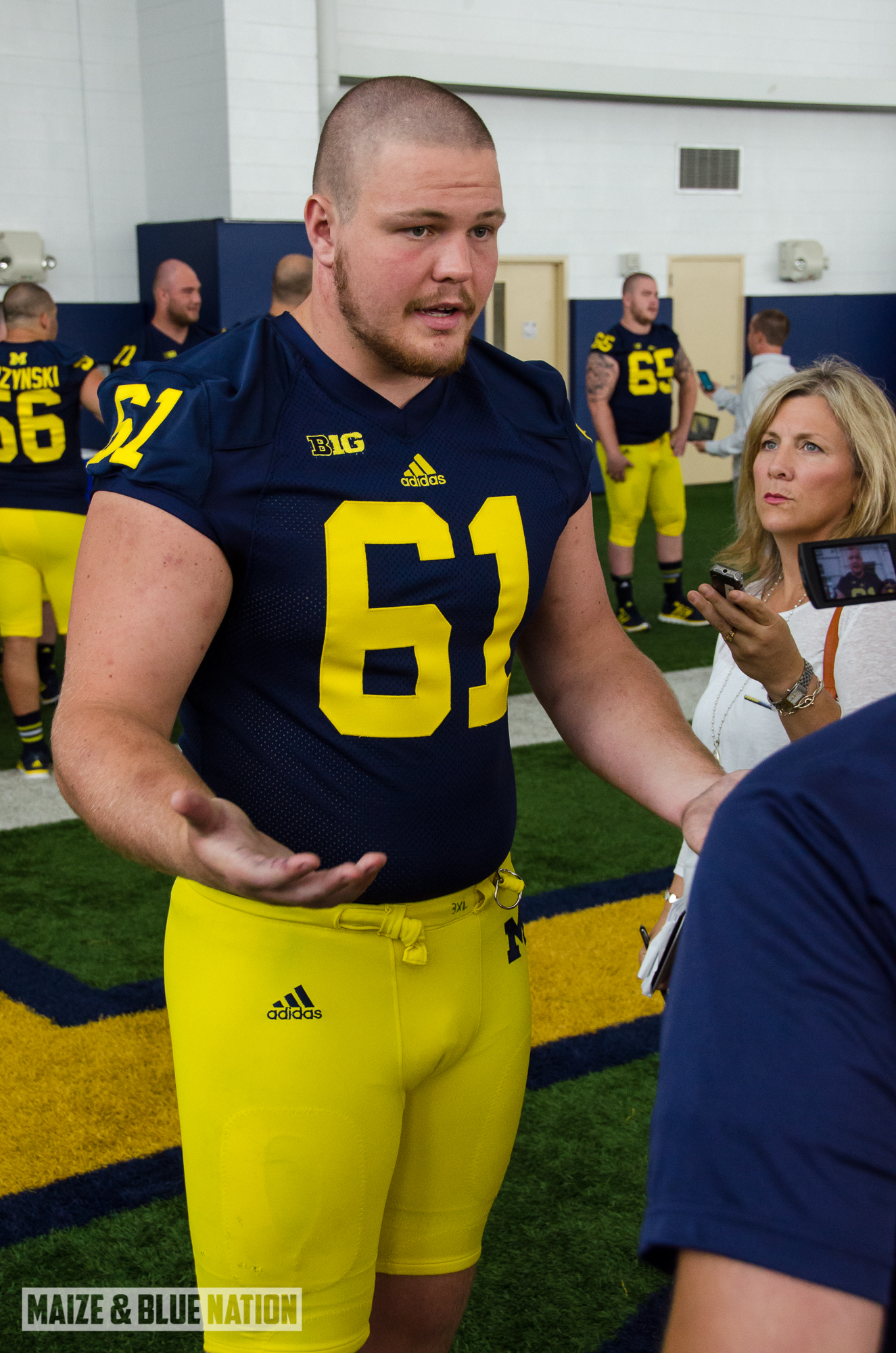
Glasgow in 2014

Glasgow came to Michigan as a walk-on in 2011, but earned a scholarship in the spring practice portion of the 2013 season. Glasgow appeared in 42 career games along the offensive line and made 37 starting assignments. Glasgow made a total of 22 starts at center (13 in 2015, nine in 2013) with his other 15 appearances coming at the guard position. Following the 2015 season, Glasgow was named the team's Hugh R. Rader Memorial Award recipient as the top offensive lineman and earned honorable mention All-Big Ten Conference accolades from both the coaches and media.

== Professional career ==
=== Pre-draft ===
Coming out of Michigan, Glasgow was projected by some analysts to be selected in the third or fourth round. He was ranked as the eighth-best offensive guard out of the 203 available by NFLDraftScout.com.

Pre-draft measurables
Height	Weight	Arm length	Hand span	Wingspan	40-yard dash	10-yard split	20-yard split	20-yard shuttle	Three-cone drill	Vertical jump	Broad jump	Bench press
6 ft 5 7/8 in (1.98 m)	307 lb (139 kg)	33 5/8 in (0.85 m)	10 3/4 in (0.27 m)	6 ft 7 5/8 in (2.02 m)	5.13 s	1.76 s	2.98 s	4.63 s	7.63 s	25 in (0.64 m)	8 ft 10 in (2.69 m)	23 reps
All values from NFL Combine

=== Detroit Lions (first stint) ===
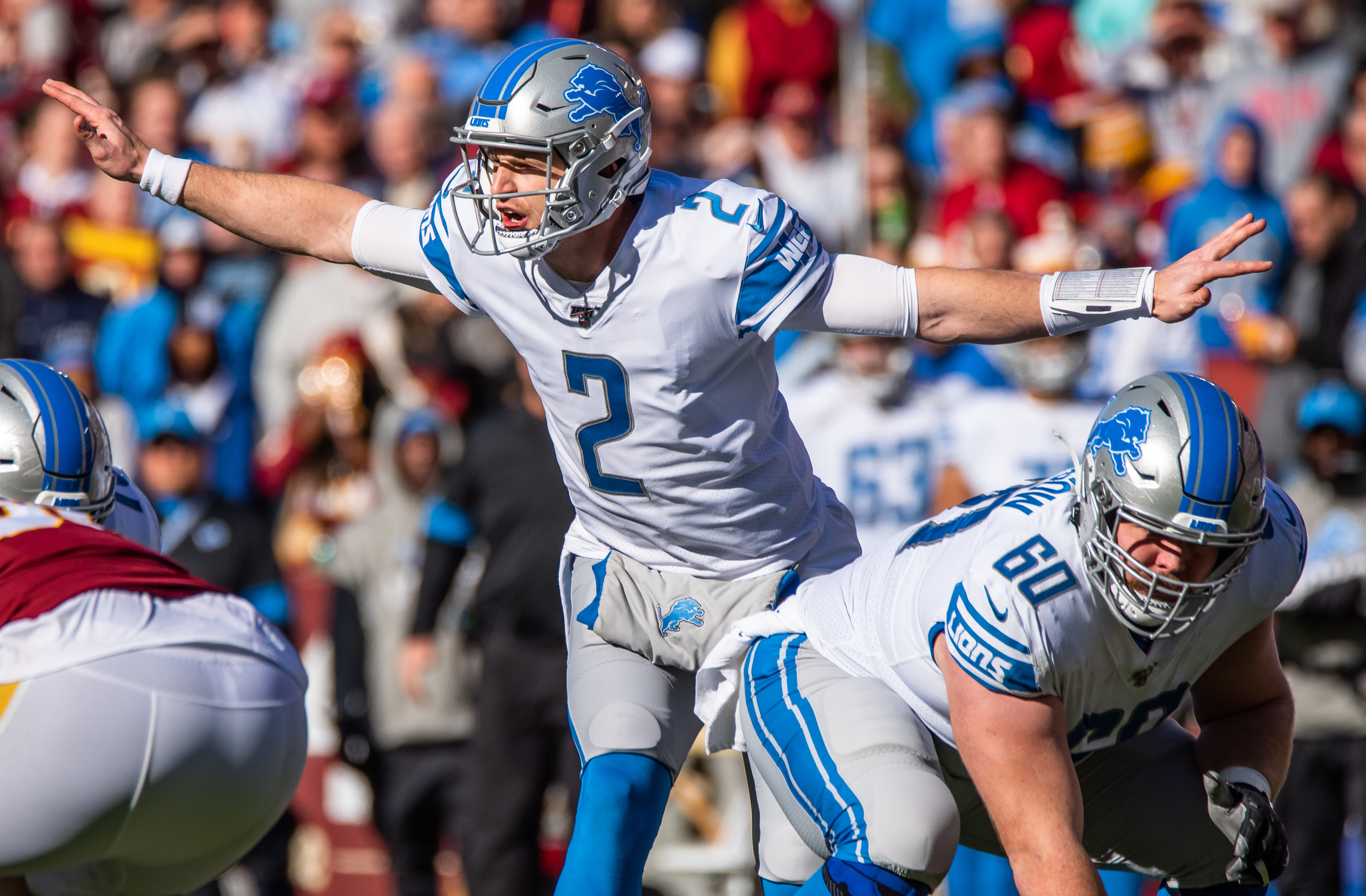
Glasgow (right) in a game against the Washington Redskins in 2019.

Glasgow was drafted in the third round with the 95th overall pick by the Detroit Lions in the 2016 NFL draft. Halfway through the season he took over as the Lions starting left guard after struggles from former first-round pick Laken Tomlinson.

In 2017, Glasgow was named the starting left guard, starting in all 16 games.

In 2018, Glasgow was named the starting center following the departure of Travis Swanson in free agency, and started all 16 games.

In 2019, Glasgow started in all 15 games he appeared in.

=== Denver Broncos ===
On March 23, 2020, Glasgow signed a four-year, $44 million contract with the Denver Broncos. He was placed on the reserve/COVID-19 list by the team on October 30, 2020, and activated on November 11. He started in all 13 games he appeared in the 2020 season.

In Week 9 of the 2021 season, Glasgow suffered an ankle injury and was placed on season-ending injured reserve on November 9, 2021. He appeared in and started seven games in the 2021 season.

In the 2022 season, Glasgow appeared in all 17 games and started 13.

On March 13, 2023, Glasgow was released by the Broncos.

=== Detroit Lions (second stint) ===
On March 20, 2023, Glasgow re-signed with the Lions. He started 15 games in 2023 primarily at right guard with a few games at left guard and center.

On March 11, 2024, Glasgow signed a three-year, $20 million contract extension with the Lions.

Glasgow played the 2024 season at left guard, then switched to center for 2025 upon the retirement of Frank Ragnow. On March 2, 2026, Glasgow was released by the Lions.

== Personal life ==
Graham Glasgow is married to Allison Davis. Glasgow is the older brother of defensive tackle Ryan Glasgow, with whom he was teammates at Michigan and formerly played for the New Orleans Saints. Glasgow's second younger brother, Jordan Glasgow, is a linebacker who formerly played for the Indianapolis Colts.

Glasgow was arrested on March 15, 2014, for driving under the influence. On July 14, he was sentenced to one year of probation, after entering a guilty plea to operating while visibly impaired. He also received six days of community service and $885 in fines and court costs. On March 15, 2015, Graham violated his probation, and had six months added to his year-long probation, after registering a .086 on a breathalyzer test.

In April 2022, Glasgow became part-owner of Limitless, an Esports organization with teams in Rocket League, Valorant and Counter-Strike: Global Offensive.
