= Matt George (American football) =

American football player (born 1975)

No. 2, 12, 9
- Position: Placekicker

Personal information
- Born: January 13, 1975 (age 51); Santa Clarita, California, U.S.
- Listed height: 5 ft 11 in (1.80 m)
- Listed weight: 190 lb (86 kg)

Career information
- High school: Canyon (Anaheim, California)
- College: Chapman
- NFL draft: 1998: undrafted

Career history
- Pittsburgh Steelers (1998); Tampa Bay Buccaneers (1999)*; New England Sea Wolves (2000); Toronto Phantoms (2001–2002); Carolina Cobras (2003); Tampa Bay Storm (2004–2005)
- * Offseason or practice squad member only
- Stats at Pro Football Reference
- Stats at ArenaFan.com

Matthew Michael George (born January 13, 1975) is an American former professional football placekicker who played in the National Football League (NFL) and Arena Football League (AFL). He played college football at Chapman University.

== Early life and college ==
Matthew Michael George was born on January 13, 1975, in Santa Clarita, California. He attended Canyon High School in Anaheim, California.

George played college football for the Chapman Panthers of Chapman University from 1996 to 1997. He made nine field goals in 1997 and was scouted by the New York Giants that season.

== Professional career ==
George signed with the Pittsburgh Steelers on April 24, 1998, after going undrafted in the 1998 NFL draft. He was released on August 24, 1998. He re-signed with the Steelers on November 13 as an emergency kicker after an injury to Norm Johnson. George played in one game for the Steelers, converting zero of one field goals and two of two extra points while also kicking off three times for 193 yards. He was released on November 16, 1998.

George signed with the Tampa Bay Buccaneers of the NFL on January 5, 1999. on February 22, he was allocated to NFL Europe to play for the Amsterdam Admirals. On April 7, 1999, before the start of the 2000 NFL Europe season, George was released by the Buccaneers.

George was signed by the New England Sea Wolves of the Arena Football League (AFL) on March 13, 2000. He played in all 14 games for the Sea Wolves during the 2000 season, converting 13 of 30 field goals and 77 of 85 extra points. He also posted five solo tackles and one assisted tackle.

George signed with the AFL's Toronto Phantoms on February 13, 2001. He appeared in all 14 games for the Phantoms in 2001, making 15 of 30 field goals and 79 of 88 extra points while also posting one solo tackle and four assisted tackles. He re-signed with the team on February 20, 2002. George was placed on refused to report on March 24, 2002, and activated on April 1, 2002. He played in all 14 games for the third straight year in 2002, recording 18 of 41 field goals, 70 of 78 extra points, and three solo tackles.

George was signed by the Carolina Cobras of the AFL on December 5, 2002. He played in all 16 games for the Cobras during the 2003 season, totaling 15 of 46 field goals, 48 of 56 extra points, five solo tackles, two assisted tackles, one forced fumble, and one fumble recovery. Carolina finished the year with an 0–16 record. George re-signed with the team on December 11, 2003. He was placed on refused to report on January 14, 2004. He was activated on January 23 but soon released on January 28, 2004.

On March 24, 2004, George signed with the Tampa Bay Storm of the AFL to replace the released Mike Black, who was the AFL's all-time leader scorer at the time. George played in three games for the Storm that year, George scoring four of six field goals and 12 of 14 extra points, before being placed on injured reserve on April 15, 2004. He re-signed with the Storm on January 12, 2005. He was placed on the refused to report list on January 13 but soon activated on January 21, 2005. George appeared in 12 games for the Storm during the 2005 season, totaling 17 of 30 field goals, 97 of 107 extra points, three solo tackles, and one assisted tackle.
