= Russell Freeman (American football) =

American football player (1969–2021)

No. 68, 77, 70
- Position: Offensive tackle

Personal information
- Born: September 2, 1969; Homestead, Pennsylvania, U.S.
- Died: November 25, 2021 (aged 52)
- Listed height: 6 ft 7 in (2.01 m)
- Listed weight: 290 lb (132 kg)

Career information
- High school: Allderdice
- College: Georgia Tech
- NFL draft: 1992: undrafted

Career history
- Denver Broncos (1992–1994); Oakland Raiders (1995)

Career NFL statistics
- Games played: 58
- Games started: 39
- Stats at Pro Football Reference

Russell Freeman (September 2, 1969 – November 25, 2021) was an American football player in the National Football League (NFL). He played for the Denver Broncos and the Oakland Raiders. He played collegiately for the Georgia Tech football team from 1988 to 1991.
