= Alcoa, Tennessee =

- City
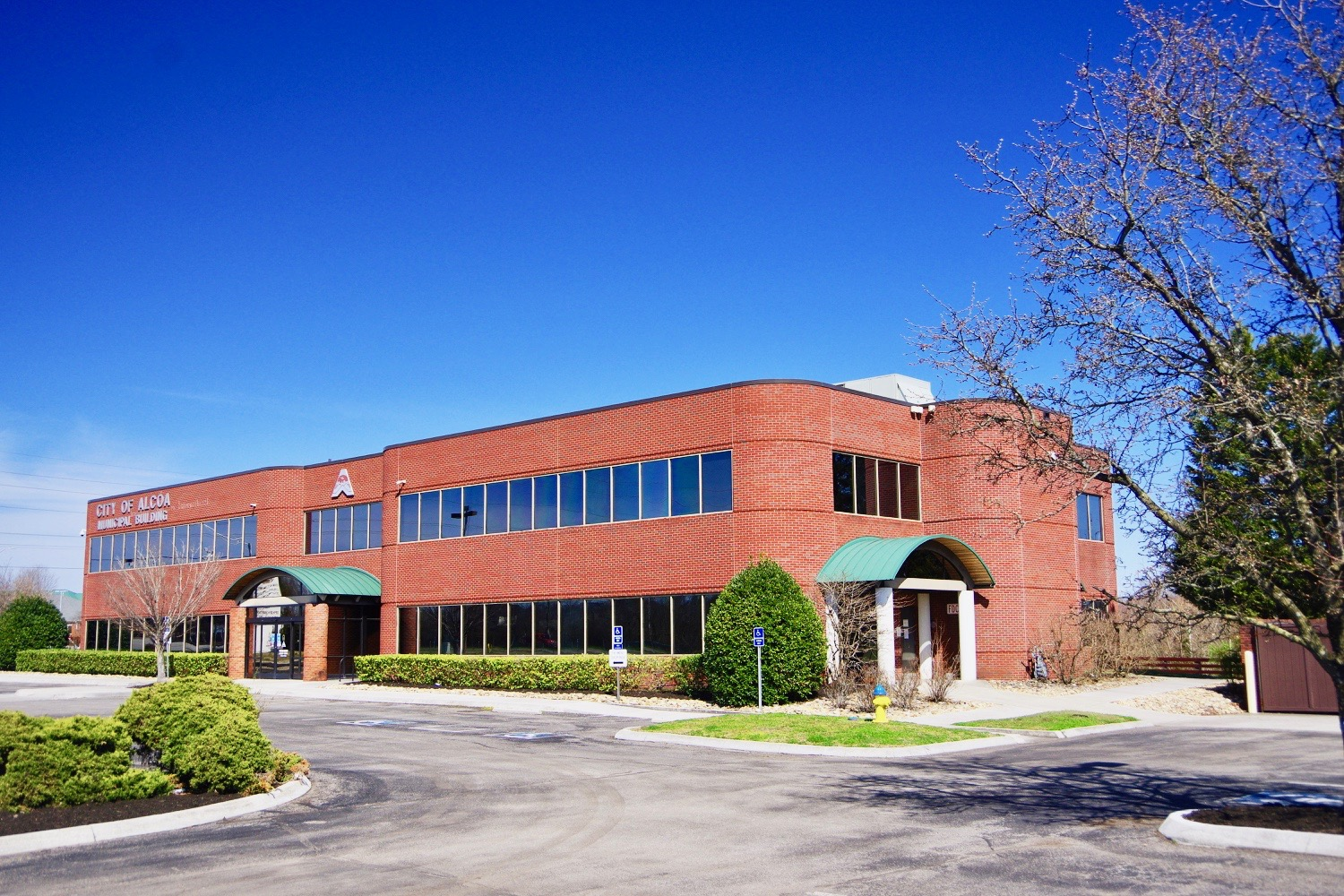
- Alcoa Municipal Building

- Flag Logo

- Location of Alcoa in Blount County, Tennessee.
- Coordinates: 35°48′27″N 83°58′31″W
- Country: United States
- State: Tennessee
- County: Blount
- Incorporated: 1919; 107 years ago
- Named for: Aluminum Company of America

Area
  - Total: 15.92 sq mi (41.22 km^{2})
  - Land: 15.00 sq mi (38.85 km^{2})
  - Water: 0.92 sq mi (2.37 km^{2})
- Elevation: 932 ft (284 m)

Population (2020)
  - Total: 10,978
  - Density: 731.8/sq mi (282.56/km^{2})
- Time zone: UTC-5 (Eastern (EST))
  - Summer (DST): UTC-4 (EDT)
- ZIP code: 37701, 37777, 37801 & 37804
- Area code: 865
- FIPS code: 47-00540
- GNIS feature ID: 2403075
- Website: www.cityofalcoa-tn.gov

Alcoa is a city in Blount County, Tennessee, United States. Its population was 10,978 at the 2020 census. It is part of the Knoxville, TN Metropolitan Statistical Area.

As its name suggests, Alcoa was the site of a large aluminum smelting plant owned and operated by the Alcoa corporation (Aluminum Company of America). Formerly known as North Maryville, the town was incorporated under its present name in 1919.

== History ==
=== Early company town ===
Shortly after the Pittsburgh Reduction Company changed its name to the Aluminum Company of America in 1907, the company began investigating the possibility of establishing a large smelting operation in East Tennessee. The hydroelectric potential of the Little Tennessee River, which exits the mountains about 20 miles (32 km) southwest of Alcoa, was one of the primary incentives, as the company's aluminum smelting operation would require massive amounts of electricity. In 1910, the company established a base camp at what is now known as Calderwood, initially known as "Alcoa", and was known as such until the name was reapplied to the company's operations in North Maryville a few years later.

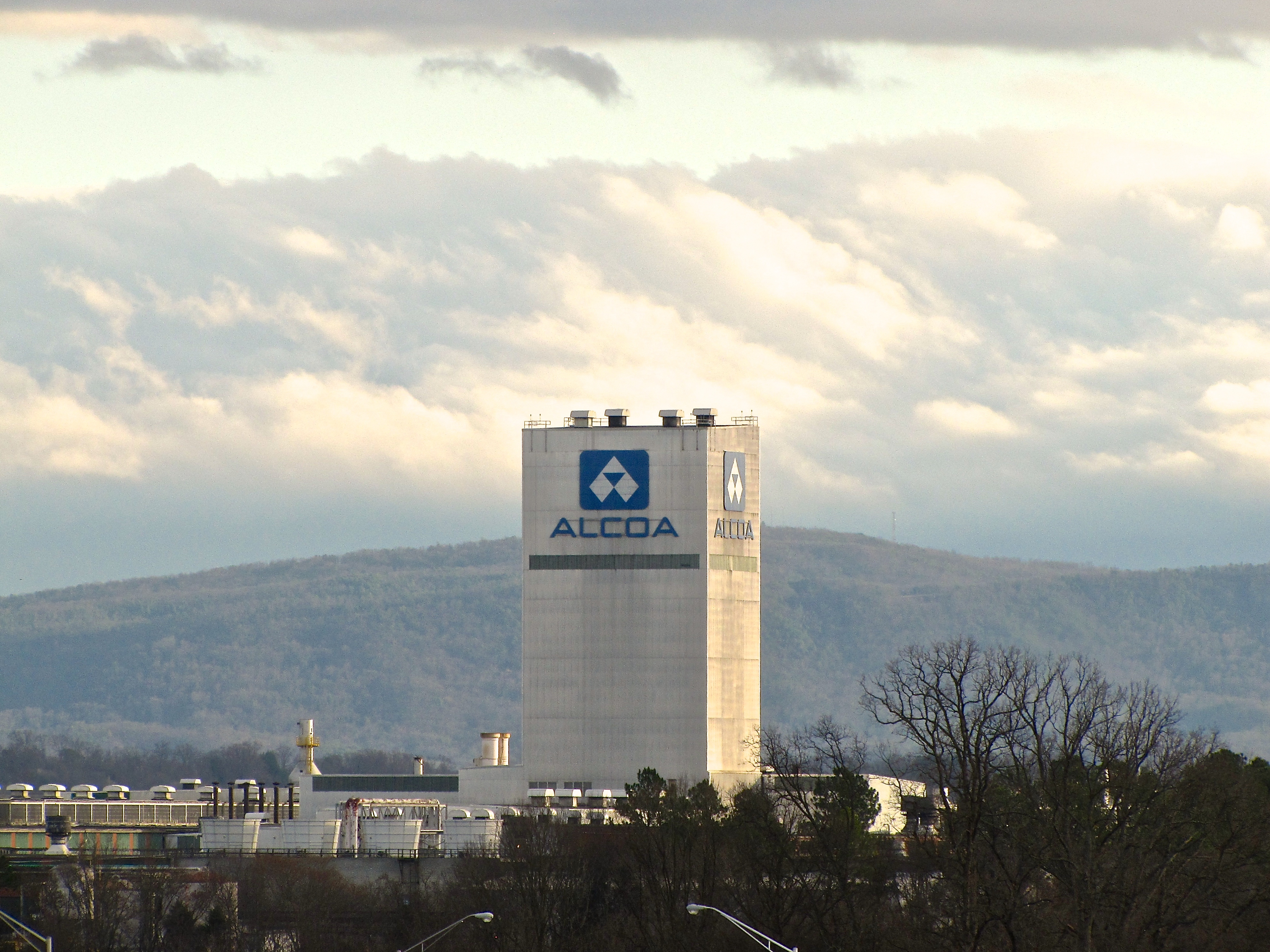
CCM tower, formerly part of ALCOA's North Plant (now operated by Arconic)

The company considered several potential plant sites in Knoxville, Etowah, and Monroe County, but chose North Maryville due in part to the influence of Maryville mayor Samuel Everett (1864–1941). By 1914, the company had completed the initial purchase of 700 acres (280 ha) in North Maryville, and had initiated construction of the smelting plant and 150 houses for company employees. ALCOA's chief engineer Edwin Fickes and hydraulic engineer Robert Ewald drew up plans for the town to house the plant's workers. The town design initially called for the acquisition of 7,500 acres (3,000 ha), and included four sections— Vose and Springbrook in the north (around what is now Springbrook Park) and Bassel and Hall in the south (around what is now the South Plant). Hall, named for the inventor of the aluminum electrolytic process, was originally a segregated community for the plant's African-American workers. Oldfield, a small community between the planned town and Maryville, would later be annexed by the city of Alcoa.

World War I brought about a spike in the demand for aluminum, and the company quickly expanded its North Maryville operations. In 1919, a rolling mill (now West Plant) was completed, and the company purchased the Knoxville Power Company for its Little Tennessee Valley holdings. That same year, the company's town officially incorporated as "Alcoa". C.L. Babcock was the town's first mayor, and Victor Hultquist was the first city manager. Hultquist, who was also ALCOA's superintendent of construction, remained city manager until 1948, and oversaw much of the town's early development. In 1920, Alcoa had a population of 3,358 people living in 700 houses.

=== The Great Depression and World War II ===
Early Alcoa was a classic "company town", with the company maintaining a paternalistic relationship with the city. The city's welfare was almost wholly dependent upon the company's fortunes. This presented a problem for the company, which feared that its workforce would leave to look for jobs elsewhere during times of low production. Thus, during the Great Depression, the company maintained steady production levels in spite of the lack of demand for aluminum. Managers sought to cut workers' hours— which at one point dropped to 30 hours per week— rather than slash jobs. By the end of the decade, the company had stockpiled 42,000 tons of aluminum.

The Depression (and accompanying New Deal legislation) also brought about increased labor union activity in Alcoa. A strike in 1934 was forcibly ended when Hultquist deployed a large police force. A second strike in 1937 was broken in a similar fashion, with two striking workers shot and killed and the National Guard forced to intervene.

World War II proved immensely profitable for ALCOA, as aluminum was needed for aircraft construction. Production increased 600% during the war, and the company's Alcoa operations workforce swelled to 12,000. In the early 1940s, the company built its North Plant, which at the time of its completion was the world's largest plant under a single roof.

=== Modern Alcoa ===
After World War II, the city of Alcoa became less and less dependent upon its parent company. Alcoa's public image had suffered due to its hardline stance toward labor unions, and in response, it launched a series of public relations initiatives, including the donation of land for schools, parks, and airport construction. The company also desegregated its facilities during this period. In the early 1950s, the company began selling off company housing to employees. In 1956, Ross Walker became the first city manager who was not employed by the company, and toward the end of the decade, the company had relinquished ownership of city utilities. The completion of the Hall Road Viaduct in the 1940s and the continued development of McGhee Tyson Airport over subsequent decades led to commercial expansion and helped the city diversify its economy.

== Geography ==
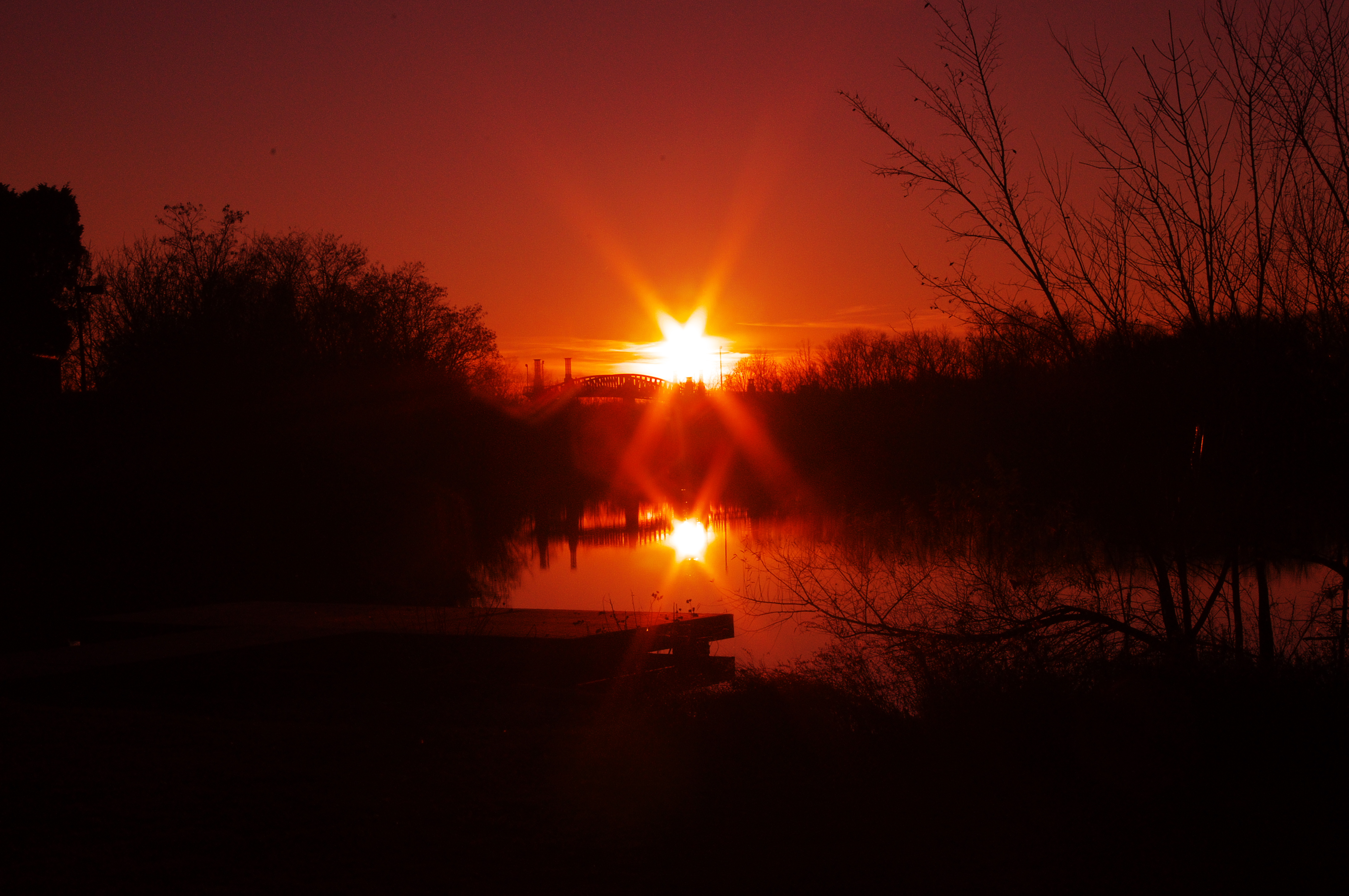
Maryville-Alcoa Greenway sunset

The city is situated in the foothills of the Great Smoky Mountains, the outermost of which, Chilhowee Mountain, rises just a few miles to the south. Large sections of the north-central and northeastern parts of the range are visible from Alcoa Highway. The Little River, which rises near the heart of the Smokies, flows through the eastern section of Alcoa before emptying into the Tennessee River near Louisville.

According to the United States Census Bureau, the city has a total area of 15.6 square miles (40.5 km^{2}), of which 14.7 square miles (38.2 km^{2}) is land and 0.93 square miles (2.4 km^{2}), or 5.90%, is water.

=== Climate ===
The climate in this area is characterized by relatively high temperatures and evenly distributed precipitation throughout the year. According to the Köppen Climate Classification system, Alcoa has a Humid subtropical climate, abbreviated "Cfa" on climate maps.

Climate data for Alcoa
| Month | Jan | Feb | Mar | Apr | May | Jun | Jul | Aug | Sep | Oct | Nov | Dec | Year |
|---|---|---|---|---|---|---|---|---|---|---|---|---|---|
| Mean daily maximum °F (°C) | 46 (8) | 51 (11) | 59 (15) | 69 (21) | 77 (25) | 84 (29) | 87 (31) | 86 (30) | 80 (27) | 69 (21) | 59 (15) | 50 (10) | 68 (20) |
| Mean daily minimum °F (°C) | 30 (−1) | 32 (0) | 37 (3) | 46 (8) | 55 (13) | 62 (17) | 68 (20) | 66 (19) | 59 (15) | 46 (8) | 37 (3) | 32 (0) | 48 (9) |
| Average precipitation inches (mm) | 4.6 (120) | 4.4 (110) | 5.2 (130) | 3.8 (97) | 3.9 (99) | 4 (100) | 4.6 (120) | 3.1 (79) | 2.9 (74) | 2.7 (69) | 3.8 (97) | 4.6 (120) | 47.5 (1,210) |
Source: Weatherbase

== Demographics ==
Historical population
| Census | Pop. | Note | %± |
|---|---|---|---|
| 1920 | 3,358 | | — |
| 1930 | 5,255 | | 56.5% |
| 1940 | 5,131 | | −2.4% |
| 1950 | 6,355 | | 23.9% |
| 1960 | 6,395 | | 0.6% |
| 1970 | 7,739 | | 21.0% |
| 1980 | 6,870 | | −11.2% |
| 1990 | 6,400 | | −6.8% |
| 2000 | 7,734 | | 20.8% |
| 2010 | 8,449 | | 9.2% |
| 2020 | 10,978 | | 29.9% |
| 2025 (est.) | 13,689 | ▲ | 24.7% |

=== 2020 census ===
As of the 2020 census, Alcoa had a population of 10,978 people and 2,574 families. The median age was 38.0 years; 23.7% of residents were under the age of 18 and 17.4% of residents were 65 years of age or older. For every 100 females there were 94.8 males, and for every 100 females age 18 and over there were 88.7 males age 18 and over.

99.3% of residents lived in urban areas, while 0.7% lived in rural areas.

There were 4,632 households in Alcoa, of which 31.1% had children under the age of 18 living in them. Of all households, 39.1% were married-couple households, 20.2% were households with a male householder and no spouse or partner present, and 32.5% were households with a female householder and no spouse or partner present. About 31.9% of all households were made up of individuals and 12.2% had someone living alone who was 65 years of age or older.

There were 4,961 housing units, of which 6.6% were vacant. The homeowner vacancy rate was 2.2% and the rental vacancy rate was 5.1%.

Racial composition as of the 2020 census
| Race | Number | Percent |
|---|---|---|
| White | 8,355 | 76.1% |
| Black or African American | 1,279 | 11.7% |
| American Indian and Alaska Native | 59 | 0.5% |
| Asian | 114 | 1.0% |
| Native Hawaiian and Other Pacific Islander | 3 | 0.0% |
| Some other race | 359 | 3.3% |
| Two or more races | 809 | 7.4% |
| Hispanic or Latino (of any race) | 805 | 7.3% |

=== 2000 census ===
As of the census of 2000, there was a population of 7,734, with 3,489 households and 2,159 families residing in the city. The population density was 560.7 inhabitants per square mile (216.5/km^{2}). There were 3,857 housing units at an average density of 279.6 per square mile (108.0/km^{2}). The racial makeup of the city was 81.15% White, 16.01% African American, 0.19% Native American, 0.34% Asian, 0.01% Pacific Islander, 0.78% from other races, and 1.53% from two or more races. Hispanic or Latino of any race were 1.89% of the population.

There were 3,489 households, out of which 24.4% had children under the age of 18 living with them, 44.6% were married couples living together, 13.6% had a female householder with no husband present, and 38.1% were non-families. 33.0% of all households were made up of individuals, and 12.5% had someone living alone who was 65 years of age or older. The average household size was 2.22 and the average family size was 2.80.

In the city, the population was spread out, with 20.9% under the age of 18, 8.0% from 18 to 24, 29.1% from 25 to 44, 24.7% from 45 to 64, and 17.2% who were 65 years of age or older. The median age was 40 years. For every 100 females, there were 91.6 males. For every 100 females age 18 and over, there were 87.4 males.

The median income for a household in the city was $33,520, and the median income for a family was $44,333. Males had a median income of $31,464 versus $23,212 for females. The per capita income for the city was $19,526. About 9.1% of families and 11.9% of the population were below the poverty line, including 18.1% of those under age 18 and 10.9% of those age 65 or over.

== Parks and recreation ==
Alcoa's early developers considered public parks an essential part of the city, and in the 1920s, Alcoa sought to set aside 1-acre (4,000 m^{2}) of land for parks for every 100 people living in the city. In the early 1930s, City Manager Hultquist used idle plant workers for park construction, and over the years, the company continued donating land for park construction and expansion. In 1998, a 3-mile (4.8 km) section of the Maryville-Alcoa Greenway was completed, connecting Alcoa's Springbrook Park with Maryville's Bicentennial Greenbelt Park.

== Education ==
Alcoa City School District is the local school district for the vast majority of the city. A few parcels are in the Blount County Schools school district.

== Infrastructure ==
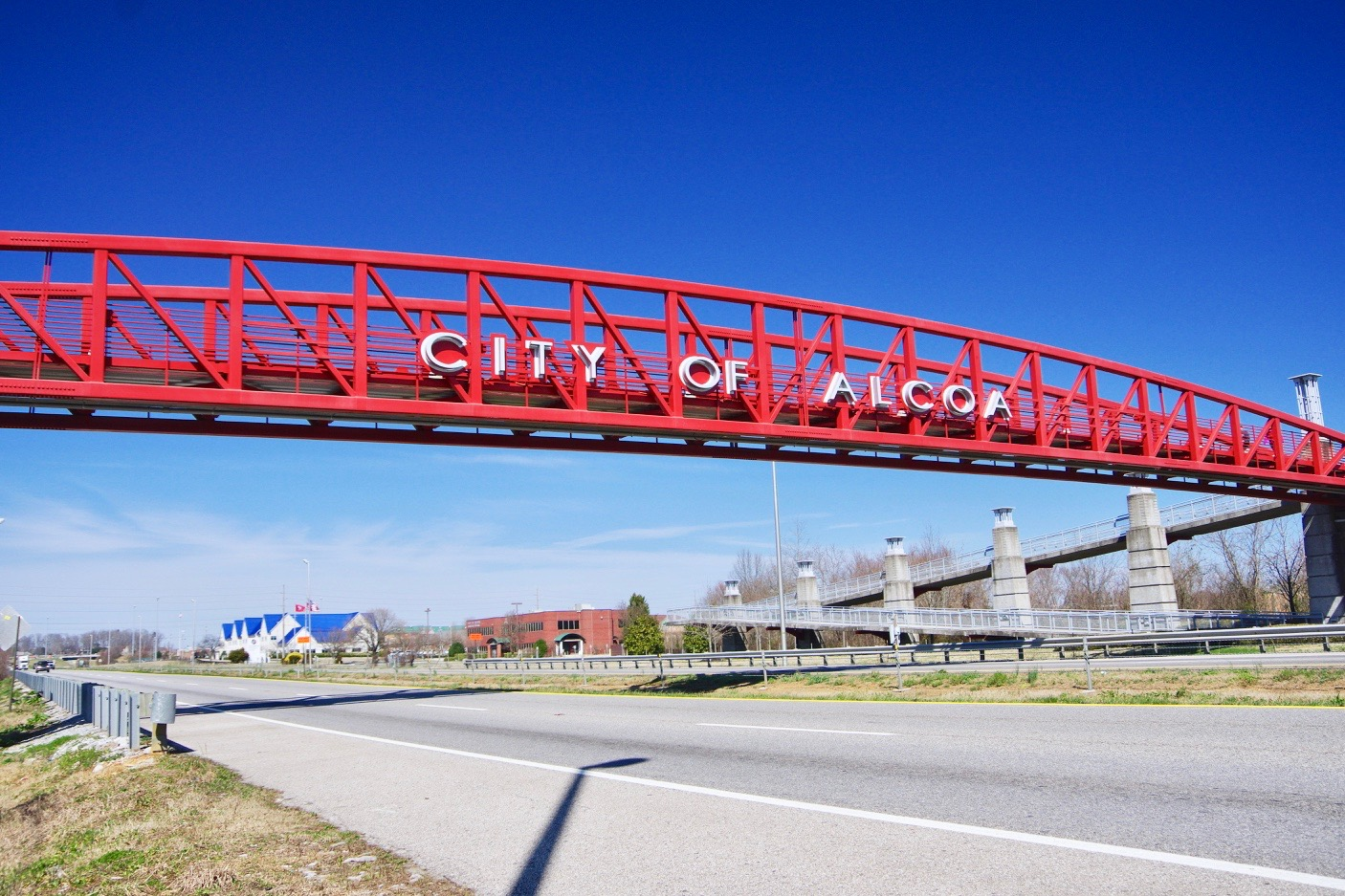
Pedestrian bridge over Alcoa Highway

In the 1990s, Alcoa engaged in a three-way struggle with Knoxville and Blount County for control of McGhee Tyson Airport, which is located in Blount County, but built and operated by Knoxville. In 1992, an attempt by Alcoa to annex the airport was blocked by a court ruling, and a similar attempt four years later was rejected by voters in a referendum. A third annexation attempt in 2002 also failed. The airport is currently managed by the Metropolitan Knoxville Airport Authority.

=== Major thoroughfares ===
- U.S. Route 129, locally known as "Alcoa Highway" or "Airport Highway", connects Alcoa with Knoxville to the north and traverses Blount County en route to the North Carolina border to the south.
- Interstate 140/Tennessee State Route 162, known as Pellissippi Parkway, connects Alcoa with west Knoxville and Oak Ridge
- State Route 35, which follows Hall Road
- State Route 334, known as Louisville Road, connects Alcoa with Louisville, Tennessee.
- State Route 335, which follows Hunt Road and Old Glory Road, connects Alcoa with eastern and western Blount County

Many of the city's streets, such as Bessemer, Joule, Edison, Darwin, and Watt, are named after famous scientists and inventors. Others, such as Hunt, Glascock, and Calderwood, were named for Alcoa company officials and engineers.

== Notable people ==
- Randall Cobb, graduate of Alcoa High School in 2008 and wide receiver for the Green Bay Packers
- Dave Davis, former wide receiver in the National Football League
- Linda Goss, award-winning storyteller
- Bessie Harvey, self-taught sculptor
- William Michaels, boxer
- Shannon Mitchell, NFL player
- Lynn Swann, NFL player, born there but grew up in San Mateo, California
- Sidney A. Wallace, U.S. Coast Guard Rear Admiral, Recipient of the Meritorious Service Medal and Coast Guard Comendation Medal
- Billy Williams, NFL player for the Washington Redskins

== Government ==
Alcoa operates under the council-manager form of government providing a full range of services including police, fire, public works, recreation, planning and code enforcement along with electric, water and sewer utilities to our 8,500 residents and our estimated 40,000 daily visitors. Current City Management Staff includes:

Alcoa City Management
| City Title | Name |
|---|---|
| City Manager | Bruce M. Applegate, Jr. |
| Deputy City Manager | |
| City Attorney | Stephanie D. Coleman |
| City Judge | Allen Bray |
| Public Information Officer | Emily Assenmacher |

== See also ==
- Millennium Manor
