= Ron Geater =

Football player (born 1969)

No. 92
- Position: Defensive end

Personal information
- Born: April 23, 1969 (age 57); Marion, Louisiana
- Listed height: 6 ft 6 in (1.98 m)
- Listed weight: 272 lb (123 kg)

Career information
- High school: Marion (IA)
- College: Iowa
- NFL draft: 1992: 7th round, 170th overall pick

Career history
- Denver Broncos (1992)
- Stats at Pro Football Reference

Ron Geater (born April 23, 1969) is a former American football defensive end. He played for the Denver Broncos in 1992.
