= John Granby (American football) =

American football player (born 1968)

No. 35
- Position: Defensive back

Personal information
- Born: November 11, 1968 (age 57); Virginia Beach, Virginia, U.S.
- Listed height: 6 ft 1 in (1.85 m)
- Listed weight: 200 lb (91 kg)

Career information
- High school: Floyd E. Kellam (Virginia Beach)
- College: Virginia Tech (1987–1991)
- NFL draft: 1992: 12th round, 334th overall pick

Career history
- Denver Broncos (1992); New England Patriots (1992)
- Stats at Pro Football Reference

John Edward Granby Jr. (born November 11, 1968) is an American former professional football defensive back who played one season with the Denver Broncos of the National Football League (NFL). He played college football for the Virginia Tech Hokies and was selected by the Broncos in the 12th round of the 1992 NFL draft.

== Early life and college ==
John Edward Granby Jr. was born on November 11, 1968, in Virginia Beach, Virginia. He attended Floyd E. Kellam High School in Virginia Beach.

Granby played college football for the Virginia Tech Hokies. He recorded one interception in 1987, four interceptions in 1988, and three interceprions in 1989. He suffered a broken jaw in the first game of the 1990 season and missed the rest of the year. Granby made four interceptions his senior year in 1991. Overall, he was a letterman in 1987, 1987, 1989, and 1991.

== Professional career ==
Granby was selected by the Denver Broncos in the 12th round, with the 334th overall pick, of the 1992 NFL draft. He officially signed with the team on July 13. He was placed on injured reserve on September 1 and later activated on November 6. Granby played in four games, starting one, for the Broncos during the 1992 season before being released on December 1, 1992.

Grandy was signed to the practice squad of the New England Patriots on December 9, 1992. He was promoted to the active roster on December 15, 1992, but did not appear in any games for the Patriots that year. He was released on February 9, 1993, re-signed on February 22, and released again on August 23, 1993.
