= North Dakota Department of Career and Technical Education =

The North Dakota Department of Career and Technical Education is part of the government of the U.S. State of North Dakota. The department is a component of the state's education system that provides technical skills and knowledge for students to succeed in careers and cross-functional workplace skills such as teamwork, problem solving, and the ability to find and use information. The state's director is Wayde Sick.

== Function ==
The department and its employees oversee all of the state's student organizations that focus on preparing students for the business world; FBLA, TSA, SkillsUSA, FCCLA, DECA, and FFA.
