= E-sign =

E-sign or esign may refer to:

- Electronic signature
  - Electronic Signatures in Global and National Commerce Act, a United States federal law
  - ESign (India), an electronic signature service
- Estimated sign (℮), in the European Union

== See also ==
- E-Mark (disambiguation)
