= List of PDK International chapters =

PDK International, previously known as Phi Delta Kappa International, is an international professional organization for educators. It formed from the merger of Pi Kappa Mu, Phi Delta Kappa, and Nu Rho Beta in Chicago, Illinois, on March 1, 1910, The resulting Phi Delta Kappa chapters retained the charter dates from the predecessor fraternities. Following is a list of PDK International chapters, with active chapters indicated in bold and inactive chapters in italics.

== Undergraduate/Collegiate chapters ==
Chapter	Former name	Charter date	Institution	Location	Status	Ref.
Indiana University	Alpha	January 24, 1906	Indiana University	Bloomington, Indiana	Inactive	(Note: Chapter formed from the Alpha chapter of Pi Kappa Mu, with the national merger of the three fraternities.)
Columbia University	Beta	March 13, 1908	Columbia University	New York, New York	Inactive	(Note: Chapter formed from the Alpha chapter of Phi Delta Kappa, with the national merger of the three fraternities.)
University of Missouri	Gamma	February 23, 1909	University of Missouri	Columbia, Missouri	Inactive	(Note: Chapter formed from Nu Rho Beta (local) with the national merger of the three fraternities.)
	Delta	September 17, 1909	Stanford University	Stanford, California	Inactive	(Note: Chapter formed from a chapter of Pi Kappa Mu, with the national merger of three fraternities.)
	Epsilon	June 1, 1909	University of Iowa	Iowa City, Iowa	Inactive	
**University of Chicago/DePaul University**	Zeta	November 21, 1909	University of Chicago	Chicago, Illinois	Active	(Note: Chapter formed from the Beta chapter of Phi Delta Kappa at the University of Chicago and later expanded to include DePaul.)
**University of Chicago/DePaul University**	Zeta	November 21, 1909	DePaul University	Chicago, Illinois	Active	(Note: Chapter formed from the Beta chapter of Phi Delta Kappa at the University of Chicago and later expanded to include DePaul.)
	Eta	February 9, 1910	University of Minnesota	Minneapolis, Minnesota	Inactive	
	Theta	May 23, 1911	Cornell University	Ithaca, New York	Inactive	
	Iota	May 26, 1911	Harvard University	Cambridge, Massachusetts	Inactive	
	Kappa	May 4, 1912	University of Kansas	Lawrence, Kansas	Inactive	
**University of California/Berkeley**	Lambda	March 15, 1913	University of California, Berkeley	Berkeley, California	Active	
**University of Texas**	Mu	May 31, 1911	University of Texas at Austin	Austin, Texas	Active	
	Nu	May 31, 1913 - Prior to July 1920; April 23, 1924	University of Washington	Seattle, Washington	Inactive	
**University of Pittsburgh-Three Rivers**	Xi	June 11, 1914	University of Pittsburgh	Pittsburgh, Pennsylvania	Active	
**University of Nebraska/Lincoln**	Omicron	June 12, 1914	University of Nebraska–Lincoln	Lincoln, Nebraska	Active	
	Pi	December 21, 1914	University of Illinois	Champaign, Illinois	Inactive	
**New York University**	Rho	October 30, 1915	New York University	New York, New York	Active	
Ohio State University	Sigma	December 1, 1916	Ohio State University	Columbus, Ohio	Inactive	
**University of Pennsylvania**	Tau	December 16, 1916	University of Pennsylvania	Philadelphia, Pennsylvania	Active	
**Northwestern University**	Upsilon	June 5, 1917	Northwestern University	Evanston, Illinois	Active	
	Phi	January 28, 1921	University of Wisconsin	Madison, Wisconsin	Inactive	
	Chi	February 19, 1921	University of Oregon	Eugene, Oregon	Inactive	
**George Peabody College for Teachers of Vanderbilt**	Psi	February 18, 1921	Vanderbilt Peabody College of Education and Human Development	Nashville, Tennessee	Active	(Note: Chapter formed at George Peabody College for Teachers.)
	Omega	March 12, 1921	University of Michigan	Ann Arbor, Michigan	Inactive	
	Alpha Alpha	May 6, 1921	University of Oklahoma	Norman, Oklahoma	Inactive	
	Alpha Beta	October 22, 1921	University of Virginia	Charlottesville, Virginia	Inactive	
	Alpha Gamma	February 28, 1922	Washington State University	Pullman, Washington	Inactive	
**Kansas State University**	Alpha Delta	May 20, 1922	Kansas State University	Manhattan, Kansas	Active	
**University of Southern California**	Alpha Epsilon	June 10, 1922	University of Southern California	Los Angeles, California	Active	
**University of Arizona**	Alpha Zeta	May 3, 1924	University of Arizona	Tucson, Arizona	Active	
	Alpha Eta	May 3, 1924	Temple University	Philadelphia, Pennsylvania	Inactive	
	Alpha Theta	May 15, 1924	University of North Dakota	Grand Forks, North Dakota	Inactive	
	Alpha Iota	May 24, 1924	University of Cincinnati	Cincinnati, Ohio	Inactive	
	Alpha Kappa	1925	University of Tennessee	Knoxville, Tennessee	Inactive	
	Alpha Lambda	1925	Boston University	Boston, Massachusetts	Inactive	
	Alpha Mu	1926	University of Northern Colorado	Greeley, Colorado	Inactive	(Note: Chapter formed at the Colorado State Teachers College, now the University of Northern.)
	Alpha Nu	1928	University of Kentucky	Lexington, Kentucky	Inactive	
	Alpha Xi	1930	University of Alabama	Tuscaloosa, Alabama	Inactive	
	Alpha Omicron	1932	Claremont Men's College	Claremont, California	Inactive	
	Alpha Pi	1932	Rutgers University	New Brunswick, New Jersey	Inactive	
Johns Hopkins University	Alpha Rho	1932	Johns Hopkins University	Baltimore, Maryland	Active	
	Alpha Sigma	1933	University of Denver	Denver, Colorado	Inactive	
	Alpha Tau	1935	Pennsylvania State University	University Park, Pennsylvania	Inactive	
	Alpha Upsilon	1936	University of Utah	Salt Lake City, Utah	Inactive	
	Alpha Phi	1936	Syracuse University	Syracuse, New York	Inactive	
	Alpha Chi	1936	University of California, Los Angeles	Los Angeles, California	Inactive	
	Alpha Psi	1938	University Buffalo	Buffalo, New York	Inactive	
	Alpha Omega	1938	Wayne State University	Detroit, Michigan	Inactive	
	Beta Alpha	1938	Louisiana State University	Baton Rouge, Louisiana	Inactive	
	Beta Beta	1939	University of North Texas	Denton, Texas	Inactive	(Note: Chapter formed at North Texas State College, now the University of North Texas.)
	Beta Gamma	1941	George Washington University	Washington, D.C.	Inactive	
	Beta Delta	1941	University of Colorado Boulder	Boulder, Colorado	Inactive	
	Beta Epsilon	1942	University of Maryland, College Park	College Park, Maryland	Inactive	
	Beta Zeta	1942	Oklahoma State University	Stillwater, Oklahoma	Inactive	
	Beta Eta	1944	Western Michigan University	Kalamazoo, Michigan	Inactive	
	Beta Theta	1945	University of North Carolina at Chapel Hill	Chapel Hill, North Carolina	Inactive	
	Beta Iota	1947	Washington University in St. Louis	St. Louis, Missouri	Inactive	
	Beta Kappa	1947	Iowa State University	Ames, Iowa	Inactive	
	Beta Lambda	1947	Indiana State University	Terre Haute, Indiana	Inactive	
	Beta Mu	1948	University of Wyoming	Laramie, Wyoming	Inactive	
	Beta Nu	1948	University of Mississippi	Oxford, Mississippi	Inactive	
	Beta Xi	1949	University of Florida	Gainesville, Florida	Inactive	
	Beta Omicron	1949	Utah State University	Logan, Utah	Inactive	
	Beta Pi	1949	Ball State University	Muncie, Indiana	Inactive	(Note: Chapter formed at Ball State Teachers College, now Ball State University.)
	Beta Rho	1949	University of New Mexico	Albuquerque, New Mexico	Inactive	
	Beta Sigma	1949	Brigham Young University	Provo, Utah	Inactive	
	Beta Tau	1949	University of Hawaiʻi at Mānoa	Honolulu, Hawaii	Inactive	
	Beta Upsilon	1950	University of South Dakota	Vermillion, South Dakota	Inactive	
**University of Connecticut**	Beta Phi	1951	University of Connecticut	Storrs, Connecticut	Active	
**University of the Pacific**	Beta Chi	1951	University of the Pacific	Lodi, California	Active	
	Beta Psi	1951	Bradley University	Peoria, Illinois	Inactive	
	Beta Omega	1952	University of Idaho	Moscow, Idaho	Inactive	
	Gamma Alpha	1952	University of Arkansas	Fayetteville, Arkansas	Inactive	
	Gamma Beta	1953	University of Houston	Houston, Texas	Inactive	
	Gamma Gamma	1953	University of Southern Mississippi	Hattiesburg, Mississippi	Inactive	
	Gamma Delta	1953	Arizona State University	Tempe, Arizona	Inactive	
**University of San Diego**	Gamma Epsilon	1953	University of San Diego	San Diego, California	Active	
**University of Montana**	Gamma Zeta	1953	University of Montana	Missoula, Montana	Active	
	Gamma Eta	1953	Auburn University	Auburn, Alabama	Inactive	
	Gamma Theta	1953	Florida State University	Tallahassee, Florida	Inactive	
	Gamma Iota	1954	San Francisco State University	San Francisco, California	Inactive	
	Gamma Kappa	1955	Butler University	Indianapolis, Indiana	Inactive	
	Gamma Lambda	1955	Southern Illinois University Carbondale	Carbondale, Illinois	Inactive	
	Gamma Mu	1955	University of Georgia	Athens, Georgia	Inactive	
**University of Toronto**	Gamma Nu	1955	University of Toronto	Toronto, Ontario, Canada	Active	
	Gamma Xi	1955	University of Miami	Coral Gables, Florida	Inactive	
	Gamma Omicron	1955	University of Minnesota Duluth	Duluth, Minnesota	Inactive	
**California State University/Chico**	Gamma Pi	1956	California State University, Chico	Chico, California	Active	(Note: Chapter formed at Chico State College, now called California State University, Chico.)
	Gamma Rho	1956	California State University, Long Beach	Long Beach, California	Inactive	(Note: Chapter formed at Long Beach State College, now California State University, Long Beach.)
	Gamma Sigma	1956	Case Western Reserve University	Cleveland, Ohio	Inactive	(Note: Chapter formed at Western Reserve University, now Case Western Reserve University.)
	Gamma Tau	1956	Kent State University	Kent, Ohio	Inactive	
Michigan State University	Gamma Upsilon	1956	Michigan State University	East Lansing, Michigan	Inactive	
	Gamma Phi	1956	Bowling Green State University	Bowling Green, Ohio	Inactive	
	Gamma Chi	1956	Ohio University	Athens, Ohio	Inactive	
	Gamma Psi	1956	University of Nevada, Reno	Reno, Nevada	Inactive	
	Gamma Omicron	1956	San Jose State University	San Jose, California	Inactive	
	Delta Alpha	1956	Miami University	Oxford, Ohio	Inactive	
	Delta Beta	1957	University of Northern Iowa	Cedar Falls, Iowa	Inactive	(Note: Chapter formed at Iowa State Teachers College, now University of Northern Iowa.)
	Delta Gamma	1957	Eastern Michigan University	Ypsilanti, Michigan	Inactive	
	Delta Delta	1957	Northern Illinois University	DeKalb, Illinois	Inactive	
**East Texas A&M-Commerce**	Delta Epsilon	1957	East Texas A&M University	Commerce, Texas	Active	(Note: Chapter formed at East Texas State College, now East Texas A&M University.)
	Delta Zeta	1957	Texas Tech University	Lubbock, Texas	Inactive	
	Delta Eta	1957	Appalachian State University	Boone, North Carolina	Inactive	
	Delta Theta	1957	Northern Arizona University	Flagstaff, Arizona	Inactive	(Note: Chapter formed at Arizona State College, now Northern Arizona University.)
	Delta Iota	1958	Pittsburg State University	Pittsburg, Kansas	Inactive	(Note: Chapter formed at Kansas State Teachers College of Pittsburg, now called Pittsburg State University.)
	Delta Kappa	1958	Emporia State University	Emporia, Kansas	Inactive	(Note: Chapter formed at Kansas State Teachers College, now called Emporia State University.)
	Delta Lambda	1958	Fort Hays State University	Hays, Kansas	Inactive	
	Delta Mu	1958	University of Wisconsin–Madison	Madison, Wisconsin	Inactive	
	Delta Nu	1958	California State University, Sacramento	Sacramento, California	Inactive	(Note: Chapter formed at Sacramento State College, now called California State University, Sacramento.)
	Delta Xi	1958	California State University, Fresno	Fresno, California	Inactive	(Note: Chapter formed at Fresno State College, now called California State University, Fresno.)
	Delta Omicron	1958	University of Memphis	Memphis, Tennessee	Inactive	
	Delta Pi	1958	East Carolina University	Greenville, North Carolina	Inactive	
	Delta Rho	1959	University of Central Missouri	Warrensburg, Missouri	Inactive	(Note: Chapter formed at Central Missouri State College, now called University of Central Missouri.)
	Delta Sigma	1959	Texas Christian University	Fort Worth, Texas	Inactive	
	Delta Tau	1959	Northern State University	Aberdeen, South Dakota	Inactive	
**University of Nebraska/Omaha**	Delta Upsilon	1959	University of Nebraska Omaha	Omaha, Nebraska	Active	(Note: Chapter formed at the University of Omaha, now the University of Nebraska Omaha.)
**Wichita State University**	Delta Phi	1959	Wichita State University	Wichita, Kansas	Active	
	Delta Chi	1959	Central Michigan University	Mount Pleasant, Michigan	Inactive	
	Delta Psi	1959	Eastern Washington University	Cheney, Washington	Inactive	
	Delta Omega	1959	Eastern Illinois University	Charleston, Illinois	Inactive	
	Epsilon Alpha	1959	California State University, Los Angeles	Los Angeles, California	Inactive	(Note: Chapter formed at Los Angeles State College of Applied Arts and Sciences, now called California State University, Los Angeles.)
	Epsilon Beta	1959	Eastern New Mexico University	Portales, New Mexico	Inactive	
	Epsilon Gamma	1959	Truman State University	Kirksville, Missouri	Inactive	(Note: Chapter formed at Northeast Missouri State Teachers College, now Truman State University.)
**University of British Columbia/Okanagan**	Epsilon Delta	1960	University of British Columbia Okanagan	Kelowna, British Columbia, Canada	Active	
	Epsilon Epsilon	1960	Adams State University	Alamosa, Colorado	Inactive	
	Epsilon Zeta	1960	Arkansas State University	Jonesboro, Arkansas	Inactive	
	Epsilon Eta	1960	University of Central Arkansas	Conway, Arkansas	Inactive	(Note: Chapter formed at Arkansas State Teachers College, now called the University of Central Arkansas.)
	Epsilon Theta	1961	St. Cloud State University	St. Cloud, Minnesota	Inactive	
	Epsilon Iota	1961	Minnesota State University, Mankato	Mankato, Minnesota	Inactive	(Note: Chapter formed at Mankato State College, now called Minnesota State University, Mankato.)
	Epsilon Kappa	1961	Western Kentucky University	Bowling Green, Kentucky	Inactive	
	Epsilon Lambda	1961	Colorado State University	Fort Collins, Colorado	Inactive	
	Epsilon Mu	1961	Central Washington University	Ellensburg, Washington	Inactive	
	Epsilon Nu	1961	West Virginia University	Morgantown, West Virginia	Inactive	
**Western Illinois University**	Epsilon Xi	1962	Western Illinois University	Macomb, Illinois	Active	
	Epsilon Omicron	1962	State University of New York at Albany	Albany, New York	Inactive	
		1962	Indiana University of Pennsylvania	Indiana, Pennsylvania		
		1962	Eastern Kentucky University			
**Southern University**		1962	Southern University	Baton Rouge, Louisiana	Active	
		1963	University of Akron			
**Florida A & M University**		1963	Florida A&M University	Tallahassee, Florida	Active	
		1963	New Mexico State University			
		1963	Montana State University			
		1963	Western Washington University			
**University of Alberta**		1963	University of Alberta	Edmonton, Canada	Active	
		1964	Northwestern Louisiana State University			
		1964	Illinois State University	Normal, Illinois		
		1964	Lehigh University			
		1964	University of Missouri - Kansas City			
		1965	Mississippi State University			
		1965	Boston College			
		1965	**American University**	Washington, D.C.	Active	
		1965	University of Wisconsin–Superior			
		1965	University of Massachusetts			
		1966	Montclair State University			
		1966	University of Detroit			
		1966	Sul Ross State University			
		1966	Rowan University			
		1966	University of Dayton			
		1966	SUNY-Geneseo			
		1966	Black Hills State University			
**St Johns University**		1966	St. John's University	Jamaica, New York	Active	
		1966	Stephen F. Austin University			
		1967	University of Wisconsin-Platteville			
		1967	Marshall University			
		1967	Buffalo State University			
		1967	Western Carolina University			
		1967	Georgia Southern University			
		1967	Northern Michigan University			
**Adelphi University**			Adelphi University	Garden City, New York	Active	
**Ashland University**			Ashland University	Mansfield, Ohio	Active	
**Baylor University**			Baylor University	Waco, Texas	Active	
**Biscayne Bay Florida**				Miami, Florida	Active	
**Buffalo/Niagara**				Buffalo, New York	Active	
**Central Massachusetts**				Worcester, Massachusetts	Active	
**Central Savannah River Area Georgia**				Augusta, Georgia	Active	
**Central Washington**				Ellensburg, Washington	Active	
**Chattahoochee Valley Georgia**				Fort Benning, Georgia	Active	
**Chicago State**			Chicago State University	Chicago, Illinois	Active	
**Clark Atlanta University**			Clark Atlanta University	Atlanta, Georgia	Active	
**Concho Valley Texas**				San Angelo, Texas	Active	
**Concordia University Chicago**			Concordia University Chicago	River Grove, Illinois	Active	
**CSU East Bay - Diablo**			CaliforniaState University East Bay	Hayward, California	Active	
**East Central Florida**				Daytona Beach, Florida	Active	
**First Capital Pennsylvania**				York, Pennsylvania	Active	
**Flint Hills Kansas**				Emporia, Kansas	Active	
**Germany**				Wiesbaden, Germany	Active	
**Greater Indianapolis**				Indianapolis, Indiana	Active	
**Guam**				Guam	Active	
**Gwinnett Area Georgia**				Lawrenceville, Georgia	Active	
**Houston Area**				Houston, Texas	Active	
**Howard University**			Howard University	Washington, D.C.	Active	
**Italia**				Vicenza, Italy	Active	
**Jackson Mississippi**				Jackson, Mississippi	Active	
**Jacksonville State University**			Jacksonville State University	Jacksonville, Alabama	Active	
**Kenosha-Racine**				Racine, Wisconsin	Active	
**Kutztown Pennsylvania**				Kutztown, Pennsylvania	Inactive	
**Lindenwood Missouri**				St. Charles, Missouri	Active	
**Litchfield Hills Connecticut**				Falls Village, Connecticut	Active	
**Llano Estacado Texas**				Lubbock, Texas	Active	
**London Ontario Canada**				London, Ontario, Canada	Active	
**Long Island Regional**				Garden City, New York	Active	
**Long Island University**		1986	LIU Post	Brookville, New York	Active	
**Louisiana Bayou**				Thibodaux, Louisiana	Active	
**Manila Philippines**				Manila, Philippines	Active	
**McIntosh Trail Georgia**				Griffin, Georgia	Active	
**McKinley Ohio**				Canton, Ohio	Active	
**Mercy College**			Mercy University	Dobbs Ferry, New York	Active	
**Meridian Area Mississippi**				Meridian, Mississippi	Active	
**Middle Tennessee**				Murfreesboro, Tennessee	Active	
**Natchez Mississippi**				Natchez, Mississippi	Active	
**National College of Education**			National College of Education	Wheeling, Illinois	Active	
**Nevada State**				Las Vegas, Nevada	Active	
**North Coast Ohio**				Berea, Ohio	Active	
**North Florida Regional**				Jacksonville, Florida	Active	
**Northeastern Illinois University**			Northeastern Illinois University	Chicago, Illinois	Active	
**Northwest Florida**				Pensacola, Florida	Active	
**Northwestern State University**			Northwestern State University	Natchitoches, Louisiana	Active	
**Okinawa Japan**				Okinawa, Japan	Active	
**PDK Chapter at Stockton University**				Pomona, New Jersey	Active	
**PDK–Marin**				Larkspur, California	Active	
**Pine Belt Area**				Hattiesburg, Mississippi	Active	
**Red Cedar Area Wisconsin**				Menomonie, Wisconsin	Active	
**Rochester New York**				Rochester, New York	Active	
**St Louis University Gateway**				St. Louis, Missouri	Active	
**Saint Thomas University**			St. Thomas University	Miami Gardens, Florida	Active	
**Sam Houston State University**			Sam Houston State University	Huntsville, Texas	Active	
**San Diego California**				San Diego, California	Active	
**San Fernando Valley California**				Los Angeles, California	Active	
**San Luis Obispo California**				San Luis Obispo, California	Active	
**Savannah Georgia**				Savannah, Georgia	Active	
**Shenandoah Valley Virginia**				Harrisonburg, Virginia	Active	
**Southeast Arkansas**				Pine Bluff, Arkansas	Active	
**Southwest Idaho**				Boise, Idaho	Active	
**Southwestern Oklahoma State University**			Southwestern Oklahoma State University	Weatherford, Oklahoma	Active	
**State of Connecticut**				New Haven, Connecticut	Active	
**State of Hawaii**				Honolulu, Hawaii	Active	
**State of Michigan**				Lansing, Michigan	Active	
**State of Minnesota**				Minneapolis, Minnesota	Active	
**State of New Mexico**				Albuquerque, New Mexico	Active	
**State of North Carolina**				Raleigh, North Carolina	Active	
**State of South Carolina**				Columbia, South Carolina	Active	
**State University College/New Paltz**			State University of New York at New Paltz	New Paltz, New York	Active	
**State of Wisconsin**				Madison, Wisconsin	Active	
**Stephen F Austin State University**			Stephen F. Austin State University	Nacagdoches, Texas	Active	
**Stony Brook University**			Stony Brook University	Stony Brook, New York	Active	
**Tennessee Technological University**			Tennessee Tech	Cookeville, Tennessee	Active	
Thailand				Thailand	Inactive	
**Tidewater Area Virginia**				Norfolk, Virginia	Active	
**Tokyo Japan**				Tokyo, Japan	Active	
**Toledo Ohio**				Toledo, Ohio	Active	
**Tulsa Oklahoma**				Tulsa, Oklahoma	Active	
**Tuskegee University**			Tuskegee University	Tuskegee, Alabama	Active	
**University of British Columbia**			University of British Columbia	Vancouver, British Columbia, Canada	Active	
**University of San Francisco**			University of San Francisco	San Francisco, California	Active	
**University of the District of Columbia**			University of the District of Columbia	Washington, D.C.	Active	
**University of Texas - Dallas**			University of Texas at Dallas	Richardson, Texas	Active	
**University System of Maryland**			University System of Maryland	Baltimore, Maryland	Active	
**Utica Mississippi**				Utica, Mississippi	Active	
**Utica New York**				Utica, New York	Active	
**Walden University Cyberspace**			Walden University	Baltimore, Maryland	Active	
**West Georgia**				Carrollton, Georgia	Active	
**Western Arkansas**				Fort Smith, Arkansas	Active	
**Western Connecticut State University**			Western Connecticut State University	Danbury, Connecticut	Active	
**Wright State University**			Wright State University	Dayton, Ohio	Active	

== Alumni chapters ==
Chapter	Former name	Charter date	Institution	Location	Status	Ref.
	Alumnus Alpha	September 27, 1912	San Francisco	San Francisco, California		
	Alumnus Beta	1914	St. Louis	St. Louis, Missouri		
	Alumnus Gamma	May 8, 1915	Kansas	Topeka, Kansas		
	Alumnus Delta	May 8, 1915	Fresno	Fresno, California		
	Alumnus Epsilon	May 27, 1916	Los Angeles	Los Angeles, California		
	Alumnus Zeta	February 2, 1922	Detroit	Detroit, Michigan		
	Alumnus Eta	July 24, 1923	Santa Barbara	Santa Barbara, California		
	Alumnus Theta	May 23, 1924	Kansas City	Kansas City, Missouri		
