= Helen Jefferson Loane =

American classicist

Helen Jefferson Loane (1907–1992) was an American classicist. She studied at Goucher College, Cornell University, and Johns Hopkins University. She is best known for her book, Industry and Commerce of the City of Rome (50 B.C. – 200 A.D.), first published in 1937 in Studies in Historical and Political Science. She worked at various private and public schools, including Johns Hopkins University and Albright College. She was a member of various prestigious organizations, including Pi Lambda Theta, Phi Beta Kappa, the American Philological Association, and the Classical Association of the Atlantic States (CAAS).

== Education ==
After earning her bachelor's degree from Goucher College in 1928, Loane took a two-year break in her studies to work as a Latin teacher for Baltimore's Department of Public Instruction. While still working, she resumed her studies, this time at Cornell University, and earned a Master of Arts degree in 1931. In 1934 she left her teaching post to pursue a doctorate at Johns Hopkins University. For her dissertation she published Industry and Commerce of the City of Rome (50 B.C. – 200 A.D.) in 1937. Contemporary reviews were positive, with R. Meiggs' review describing it as "the first systematic survey of the industrial and commercial life of the consuming centre of the ancient world".

== Career and organizational involvement ==
Loane worked as a Latin teacher for Baltimore's Department of Public Instruction from 1928 to 1934. After earning her doctorate, Loane would teach at various institutions, before returning to work to Johns Hopkins in 1950. There, she would work in its education department until 1960, at which point she took up a teaching position at Albright College. She would remain at Albright until her retirement in 1971.

In addition to her teaching career, Loane was an active member of Pi Lambda Theta's Johns Hopkins chapter (also known as the Chi Chapter) in the late 1940s and early 1950s. Loane is listed as chapter president in various documents ranging from 1948 to 1949, and chapter chairman from 1948 to 1950. She served on the group's National Program and Project Committee from 1949 to 1951. In 1951, the committee researched teachers' roles and responsibilities, with special emphasis on "promoting understanding of different cultures." In 1952, Loane is thanked by name in an open letter from Beulah Tatum, the then-president of Pi Lambda Theta, for "giving forty-three hours, or more than one work week" when "the national office was badly in need of assistance".

Loane was involved in several other scholarly organizations, including Phi Beta Kappa, the American Philological Association, and the Classical Association of the Atlantic States (CAAS). Loane served as CAAS' president from 1972 to 1973.

== Personal life and death ==
Loane was married to Edward S. Loane, and had three children with him. She died on 28 March 1992, age 84, at Leader Nursing Home in Reading.

== Bibliography ==
- Industry and Commerce of the City of Rome (50 B.C. – 200 A.D.) (1937) published in Studies in Historical and Political Science
- "Vespasian's Spice Market and Tribute in Kind" (1944), published in Classical Philology
- "What I Want the Schools to Teach My Children About Controversial Issues" (1951), published in the Pi Lambda Theta Journal
