= E-Mark =

E-mark or E mark may refer to:

- Type approval mark for the automotive industry
- ℮, the Estimated sign
- E-marked cable, a particular type of USB-C cable

== See also ==
- CE mark, a statement of conformity to EU standards
- E. Mark Gold, an American physicist, mathematician and computer scientist
- E. Mark Stern, an American psychologist
