= PDK International =

International professional education organization

- ΦΔΚ
- Founded: January 24, 1906; 120 years ago Indiana University
- Type: Professional
- Former affiliation: PFA
- Status: Active
- Emphasis: Education
- Scope: International
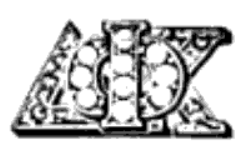
- Member badge
- Publication: Kappan
- Chapters: 124 (active)
- Headquarters: 1820 N Fort Myer Drive, Suite 320; Arlington, Virginia 22209; United States
- Website: www.pdkintl.org

PDK International (also known as PDK or Phi Delta Kappa International) is an international professional organization for educators. It was founded on January 24, 1906, at Indiana University. The fraternity administers the collegiate honor society Pi Lambda Theta and the career and technical student organization Educators Rising.

== History ==
Phi Delta Kappa formed from the merger of three organizations—Pi Kappa Mu, Phi Delta Kappa, and Nu Rho Beta. Pi Kappa Mu was established at Indiana University on January 24, 1906, and added chapters at Stanford University and the University of Iowa by 1910. Phi Delta Kappa was formed on March 13, 1908, at Columbia University and formed a second chapter at the University of Chicago in 1909. Nu Rho Beta was created at the University of Missouri on February 23, 1909.

Representatives of Pi Kappa Mu, Phi Delta Kappa, and Nu Rho Beta met in Chicago, Illinois on March 1, 1910, and agreed to a merger as Phi Delta Kappa. The new organization was a professional fraternity for the field of education. Its members were classroom teachers, college and university professors, and administrators. Membership was limited to white males at the August 1915 convention. Phi Delta Kappa joined the Professional Interfraternity Conference in 1928.

In 1940, Sigma chapter at Ohio State University initiated one Chinese and one Black member and was suspended at the December 1941 convention with charter revocation to occur in May 1942 if the chapter did not remove membership for the two non-whites. A demand for a popular vote of the entire membership led to a membership poll being sent to all members and eventually the deletion of the "white clause" by the membership. On June 2, 1942, an announcement was made to all of the chapters of the removal of the race restriction. Women would still be barred from membership for another 30 years, though some chapters ignored the organization's constitution and admitted women. As of the passing of a constitutional amendment (288–94) on February 13, 1974, Bessie Gabbard, a member of the Board of Governors of the Phi Delta Kappa Educational Foundation. was the first woman admitted into membership.

By 1962, the fraternity had 135 active campus chapters, 85 community-based chapters, and a total of 93,000 members.

Programs administered by the fraternity include the collegiate honor society Pi Lambda Theta and the career and technical student organization Educators Rising. PDK International's national headquarters is located in Arlington, Virginia.

== Symbols ==
Phi Delta Kappa's coat of arms includes three keystones for the founding institutions; three stars representing child, home, and school; a burning lamb and book representing research; a flaming torch symbolizing service; and an upraised hand with a sword to symbolize leadership. Acanthus leaves surround the shield and represent learning.

Phi Delta Kappa's badge is a monogram of the Greek letters ΦΔΚ on top. The fraternity also has a service key. Starting in 1915, it has published Phi Delta Kappan, a professional journal for education.

== Governance ==
Phi Delta Kappa is governed by an International Board, who are elected by the fraternity's members. The fraternity abides by the constitution and bylaws of PDK International. The chief executive of PDK International is James F. Lane.

== Chapters ==
As of January 2024, Phi Delta Kappa International had 124 chapters.

== Notable members ==
- Edna P. Amidon, chief of the Home Economics Education Service of the United States Office of Education
- Hattie Bessent, psychiatric nurse, professor at University of Florida, and graduate dean at Vanderbilt University
- Esther Buckley, member of the United States Commission on Civil Rights
- John Napier Burnett (Epsilon Delta), pioneer of education in British Columbia
- William C. Chasey, educator and lobbyist
- Kenneth Creasy, Ohio House of Representatives
- Kay Cornelius, novelist
- Barbara Curbow, professor and chair of the Department of Behavioral and Community Health at the University of Maryland
- Fenwick W. English, chair of education at the University of North Carolina at Chapel Hill
- Sidney Clarence Garrison, second president of Peabody College
- Victor Gaston, Alabama House of Representatives
- Gene V. Glass, statistician and researcher working in educational psychology and the social sciences
- Frank Pierrepoint Graves, 3rd Commissioner of Education of the State of New York
- Syed Hassan, educationist, humanist, and the founder of INSAN School
- Edd Houck, Virginia Senate
- James Hampton Kirkland, second chancellor of Vanderbilt University
- H. S. S. Lawrence, educator
- Cloyd H. Marvin, president of the George Washington University
- Neil C. Macdonald, North Dakota Superintendent of Public Instruction
- William E. McVey, U.S. House of Representatives and professor of education at De Paul University
- Pornchai Mongkhonvanit (Thailand), president of Siam University and the International Association of University Presidents
- Alfred C. Nelson, academic who taught at the University of Denver and also served as its interim chancellor
- Blake T. Newton, Virginia Senate
- Robert Morris Ogden, dean of the Cornell University College of Arts and Sciences
- Archie Palmer, 8th president of the University of Tennessee at Chattanooga
- James Melvin Rhodes (1950), educational scientist and assistant professor of education
- Edward Rogalski, educational scientist, assistant professor of education
- Jack McBride Ryder (Michigan State) second president of Saginaw Valley State College
- W. Otto Miessner, educational scientist, assistant professor of education
- Barefoot Sanders, Senior Judge of the United States District Court for the Northern District of Texas
- Marvin Scott, college professor and politician
- Bo Shepard, head coach of the North Carolina Tar Heels men's basketball team from 1931 to 1935
- E. Mark Stern, humanistic/existential psychologist
- Brice Taylor (University of Southern California) college football coach
- Oscar Tingelstad (University of Chicago), president of Pacific Lutheran University
- Pete Turnham, Alabama House of Representatives
- Robert G. Voight, professor at Oral Roberts University
- Lawrence Walkup, professor at Oral Roberts University
- William Arthur Ward, writer and college professor
- Walter Washington, college professor and first African-American to receive a doctorate in Mississippi.
- Wilfred D. Webb, Michigan House of Representatives
- Albert Pau Weiss, behavioral psychologist, theorist, scientist, and experimentalist
- Rafael Cartagena Ródriguez, educator and former Secretary of Education of Puerto Rico

== See also ==
- Professional fraternities and sororities
