= Barbara Curbow =

American psychologist and academic

Academic background
- Education: University of California, Santa Barbara; University of California, Santa Cruz
- Thesis: Social psychological implications of restrictive health care policies (1984)

Barbara Anne Curbow is an American social/health psychologist. She is a former professor and chair of the Department of Behavioral and Community Health at the University of Maryland. Her research focuses on health disparities in treatment decision-making for adjuvant chemotherapy among colorectal cancer patients, use of alternative tobacco products, tobacco control, and cancer caregiving.

== Early life and education ==
Curbow completed her Bachelor of Arts degree in political science in 1973 and Master's degree in educational psychology in 1977 from the University of California, Santa Barbara. Following this, she earned her PhD from the University of California, Santa Cruz in 1984.

== Career ==
Upon completing her PhD, Curbow joined the faculty at Johns Hopkins Bloomberg School of Public Health (JHU) until 2006. During her tenure at the institution, she was bestowed numerous honors including induction into the Delta Omega and Phi Delta Kappa National Honor Society, JHU Department of Health Policy and Management Teaching Award for three consecutive years, and JHU Regents Fellowship. As an assistant professor of social and behavioral sciences, Curbow studied how individuals, specifically females, responded to life stressors. One of the ways she did this was by studying the driving habits of 218 female telecommunications workers, the majority of whom were married or living with a partner. She found that when women face stress at work and at home, they become aggressive drivers. Overall, 56.1 percent admitted they drove aggressively saying they "take my frustrations out from behind the wheel." Curbow later studied why teenage girls turned to smoking and ways to change those behaviors by leading the Maryland Cigarette Restitution Fund Program.

In 2006, Curbow succeeded Horace Sawyer as chairwoman of the department of rehabilitation counseling at the University of Florida College of Public Health and Health Professions (UF). Prior to joining UF full time in March 2006, she split her time between the institution and JHU. While serving as chairwoman of the department, Curbow co-authored a study with Tracey Barnett which measured hookah use among Florida teens. They found that 11 percent of Floridian high school students and 4 percent of middle school students have smoked through a hookah. In 2010, Curbow was the lead investigator on an in-depth study "looking at the factors involved in treatment decisions made by people with colorectal cancer" funded by a grant from the Bankhead-Coley Florida Cancer Research Program. As a result of her academic accomplishments, Curbow was appointed Director of the Population Sciences Section at the University of Florida Cancer Center, where she remained until 2014 when she accepted a Chair position at the University of Maryland. In 2019, Curbow stepped down as chair of the Department of Behavioral and Community Health and was succeeded by Robert S. Gold.
