= Hattie Bessent =

American psychiatric nurse

- Born: Hattie M. Bessent; March 7, 1908; Mississippi
- Died: October 31, 2015 (aged 107); Jacksonville, Florida
- Occupation: Former chief of the United states Army Nurse. Deputy executive director who has trained nurses within mental health. ANA Minority Fellowship Program 1977-1982.
- Years active: Public service for more than 20 years
- Notable work: Inducted in the American Nurses Association's Hall of Fame in June 2008.

Hattie Bessent (March 7, 1908 – October 31, 2015) was an American psychiatric nurse. Perhaps her most significant accomplishments lie in her efforts to recruit members of ethnic minority groups into the field of nursing and provide training and mentorship to increase the proportion of members of ethnic minority groups in nursing leadership positions. Bessent received her B.S. degree from Florida A&M University, an M.S. degree from Indiana University, and an EdD from the University of Florida in Psychological Foundations.

== Career ==
Bessent had a long and varied career in the nursing profession, after being trained as a psychiatric nurse. Bessent served as a Deputy Executive Director at the American Nurses Association for the Ethnic/Racial Minority Fellowship Program (EMFP) for 28 years, where she developed several programs for nursing professionals and students. Being a member of the Commission for Friendship Treaty for Americans, Dr. Hattie Bessent was sent to China through the authorization of former President Jimmy Carter. Dr. Bessent worked at many different institutions during her lifetime. She served as a professor at Florida University, a Graduate Dean at Vanderbilt University, faculty member at both University of Florida and Harvard University, and an instructor at Edward Waters College.

== Recognition ==
Bessent was designated as a Living Legend of the American Academy of Nursing, at the academy's 40th Annual Meeting and Conference in 2013. In addition, she was part of organizations such as Phi Lambda Theta and Phi Delta Kappa. Dr. Bessent also received numerous awards such as the ANA's Mary Mahoney Award, Linda Richard Award, and the National Black Nurses Association's Lifetime Achievement Award.

== Selected publications ==
1. Bessent, H. (1979). Future nurse researchers: The Registered Nurse Fellowship Program for Ethnic/Racial Minorities and the Clinical Fellowship Program for Ethnic/Racial Minorities. Kansas City, Mo.: American Nurses' Association.
2. Bessent, H. (1997). Strategies for recruitment, retention, and graduation of minority nurses in colleges of nursing. Washington, D.C: American Nurses Publishing.
3. Bessent, H. (2002). Minority nurses in the new century. Washington, D.C: American Nurses Association.
4. Bessent, H. (2008). The soul of leadership: Journeys in leadership and achievement with distinguished African American nurses. New York, NY: National League for Nursing.
5. Bessent, H. (1983). Cultural diversity in America: Implications for selected populations. Kansas City, Mo: American Nurses' Association.
