= Business Professionals of America =

Career and technical student organization

- Abbreviation: BPA
- Formation: 1966; 60 years ago
- Type: Youth organization
- Legal status: Intra-curricular non-profit organization
- Headquarters: Columbus, Ohio
- Region served: United States
- Members: Over 52,000 (More than 1,800 chapters) in 25 states, Puerto Rico, Canada, Peru, South Korea, and China
- Official language: English, Spanish
- Owner: Steven J. Mitchell
- Staff: 8
- Website: http://www.bpa.org
- Formerly called: List: Vocational Office Education Clubs of America (VOECA); Office Education Association (OEA)

Business Professionals of America (BPA) is a career and technical student organization that is headquartered in Columbus, Ohio.

== Officers ==
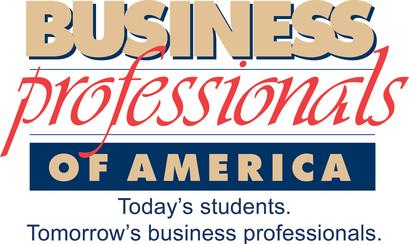
Former logo of the organization

Every Business Professionals of America chapter has presiding officers for the national organization, state associations, and local chapters. They all share and carry out similar tasks at the corresponding levels. Additionally, national virtual membership is open to any Middle Level, Secondary, or Post-secondary student in a state not currently chartering a stand-alone school chapter or virtual chapter. National virtual chapter members are able to go straight into national levels of competition.

At the national level, the national officers are collectively referred to as the Executive Council. They represent the national organization at various conferences and meetings during their term and have the opportunity to make recommendations to the National Board of Trustees.

The Executive Council for the Secondary Division is composed of up to six officer positions, including

- President
- Vice President
- Secretary
- Treasurer
- Historian
- Parliamentarian

The Executive Council for the Post-secondary Division is composed of up to four officer positions, including

- President
- Vice President
- Secretary/Treasurer
- Parliamentarian

== Philanthropy ==
BPA also collaborates during conferences to raise money for differing honorable causes including the following:

- Miracle Minute (Continuous): During a fast paced, one minute long Charity event, BPA alumni collects donations and fundraiser money from every chapter involved at the conference, raising money for the Special Olympics.
- Special Olympics Chain of Love (Continuous): During NLC registration, members are given the option to donate an extra dollar to be contributed to a link in the Special Olympics Chain of Love. This event is not restricted to purely NLC, as it has also been done at several FLC & SLC events.
- Cans for a Cause (2025): To provide relief for the up-incoming hurricanes in Florida, BPA will be running a food drive at the 2025 NLC, collecting non-perishable items for the Second Harvest Food Bank.
- Business Clothes Drive (2024): To help all students experience business related events, BPA collected professional and business casual attire at the 2024 NLC, then proceeded to donate all clothing to the Chicago Public Schools.

== Types of awards ==
BPA rewards members in three categories:

- Competitive Events: Members are rewarded for high placement in competitive events using the Workplace Skills Assessment Program (WSAP), preparing students for success in the business world by developing skills in areas such as finance, IT, and computer applications.
- BPA Cares Awards: Members can apply or nominate others for awards in the areas of Service Learning, Special Recognition, and Professional Awards.
- Torch Awards: Members are rewarded for excellence in seven categories, Citizenship; Leadership; Love, Hope, and Faith; Knowledge; Cooperation; and Friendship.

== Leadership conferences ==
There are several levels of competition held at conferences and competition advancement is sought at each level in events referred to in the awards section.

- Regional Leadership Conference (RLC) or District Leadership Conference (DLC)
- State Leadership Conference (SLC)
- National Leadership Conference (NLC)

Many regions, districts, or states opt to also arrange Fall Leadership Conferences in which there is no competition. These conferences are usually less formal than at RLC/DLC, SLC, and NLC instead often focusing on workshops over areas such as social media etiquette, proper professional dress, public speaking, etc.

The inaugural Student Leadership Summit was held in 2023 in Oklahoma City.

== National Leadership Conference ==
Every year BPA hosts a National Leadership Conference (NLC) with more than 6,000 students from across the nation. Student members vie for top honors in more than 100 competitive events, receive awards for chapter and individual achievements, participate in service activities, attend leadership workshops, and network with peers and business professionals.

Past National Leadership Conference Locations

Year	Location	Dates	Motto
1967	Green Lake, Wisconsin	—	—
1968	Des Moines, Iowa	—	—
1969	Kansas City, Missouri	—	—
1970	Fort Worth, Texas	—	—
1971	Indianapolis, Indiana	—	—
1972	Columbus, Ohio	—	—
1973	Albuquerque, New Mexico	—	—
1974	Minneapolis, Minnesota	—	—
1975	Chicago, Illinois	—	—
1976	Topeka, Kansas	—	—
1977	Houston, Texas	—	—
1978	Detroit, Michigan	—	—
1979	Cincinnati, Ohio	—	—
1980	Minneapolis, Minnesota	—	—
1981	San Antonio, Texas (Secondary); Corpus Christi, Texas (Post-Secondary)	—	—
1982	Nashville, Tennessee	—	—
1983	Chicago, Illinois (Secondary); Milwaukee, Wisconsin (Post-Secondary)	—	—
1984	Indianapolis, Indiana	—	—
1985	Houston, Texas	—	—
1986	Columbus, Ohio	—	—
1987	Des Moines, Iowa	—	—
1988	Louisville, Kentucky	—	—
1989	Dallas, Texas	—	—
1990	Minneapolis, Minnesota	—	—
1991	Orlando, Florida	—	—
1992	Cincinnati, Ohio	—	—
1993	San Antonio, Texas	—	—
1994	San Francisco, California	—	—
1995	Nashville, Tennessee	—	—
1996	Phoenix, Arizona	—	—
1997	Orlando, Florida	—	—
1998	San Antonio, Texas	—	—
1999	Philadelphia, Pennsylvania	—	—
2000	Minneapolis, Minnesota	—	—
2001	Anaheim, California	—	—
2002	Chicago, Illinois	—	"Shape Your Future"
2003	Dallas, Texas	—	"Time to Shine"
2004	Cincinnati, Ohio	—	"Strike It Rich"
2005	Anaheim, California	—	"Savor Success"
2006	Orlando, Florida	May 10–14	"Make Your Mark"
2007	New York City, New York	May 9–13	"Destination Success"
2008	Reno, Nevada	May 7–11	"Find Your Fit"
2009	Dallas, Texas	May 6–10	"Blazing New Trails"
2010	Anaheim, California	May 5–9	"Shoot for Success"
2011	Washington, DC	May 4–8	"Stand Out from the Crowd"
2012	Chicago, Illinois	April 25–29	"Reach New Heights"
2013	Orlando, Florida	May 8–12	"Uncover Your Magic"
2014	Indianapolis, Indiana	April 30 - May 4	"Accelerate Your Future"
2015	Anaheim, California	May 6–10	"Imagine. Believe. Become."
2016	Boston, Massachusetts	May 5–9	"This is Our Time"
2017	Orlando, Florida	May 10–14	"Spread Your Wings"
2018	Dallas, Texas	May 9–13	"Dream Bigger"
2019	Anaheim, California	May 1–5	"Together, We Create"
2020	Washington, DC	Canceled (Formerly May 6–10)	"Capitalize Your Future"
2021	Virtual	May 5–9	"Envision. Empower. Ignite."
2022	Dallas, Texas	May 4–8	"Go Beyond Your Limits"
2023	Anaheim, California	April 26–30	"Discover Your Purpose"
2024	Chicago, Illinois	May 10-14	"Seize the Opportunity"
2025	Orlando, Florida	May 7–11	"Capture the Moment"
2026	Nashville, Tennessee	May 6–10	"Amplify your Impact"

Future National Leadership Conference Locations

Year	Location	Dates
2027	Denver, Colorado	May 5–9
2028	Orlando, Florida	May 10–14
2029	Washington, DC	May 9–13

== History ==
Business Professionals of America was formed in 1966 as the Office Education Association (OEA).

Year	Event
1963	Vocational Education Act was passed. The need for a student organization for students enrolled in career/technical office/business programs was recognized.
1964	American Vocational Association conducted a study of 43 states indicating that 67% of the state vocational education supervisors wanted a career/technical youth group for students in office/business programs.
1965	Another study confirms the ’64 study findings; State supervisors meet to develop guidelines.
1966	In July, the Vocational Office Education Clubs of America (VOECA) was formed by the states of Iowa, Kansas, and Wisconsin. In August, VOECA convened a meeting of youth group representatives to decide the most effective means to implement the office occupations youth group. After intensive effort, articles of incorporation were filed for the Office Education Association (OEA). The first three states to affiliate were Iowa, Kansas, and Wisconsin.
1971	A national office was established for the Office Education Association in Columbus, Ohio, and the Board of Trustees approved the Alumni Division.
1973	The first full-time Executive Director of OEA was employed.
1982	The present National Center at 5454 Cleveland Avenue, Columbus, Ohio was purchased.
1983	Dedication ceremonies for the new National Center were conducted in July.
1984	Board of Trustees commissioned the Market One firm of Columbus, Ohio to do a marketing study of the OEA. The resulting long-range marketing plan recommended reform of the national image of the OEA.
1988	Image reform recommendations of the marketing study were implemented—the OEA became Business Professionals of America.
1992	The National Center is paid off and the mortgage is burned in a ceremony at the National Leadership Conference in Cincinnati, Ohio.
1998-2002	Delaware, Florida, New Mexico, Oklahoma, and Texas pilot a New BPA Middle Level program.
2002	The Middle Level Program was approved by the Board of Trustees.
2003	The Middle Level Program was approved by BPA Corporate. The BPA Middle Level Division is born.
2004	Middle Level Division members participate in the National Leadership Conference.
2006	BPA celebrates its 40th birthday.
2009	The first rescheduling of a National Leadership Conference was in Dallas, Texas. This rescheduling was due to the H1N1 Influenza.
2012	First Walk for Special Olympics held at the 2012 National Leadership Conference in Chicago, IL.
2013	National virtual competitions introduced online.
2015	First BPA Day of Service held at the 2015 National Leadership Conference in Anaheim, CA. Over 3,800 service activities were completed during this event.
2016	BPA Celebrates five decades of student achievement with its 50-Year Anniversary in Boston, MA and set a Guinness World Record for the largest gathering of people wearing tie dye Fenway Park.
2017	The 2017-2018 National Officer Team created BPA United, a project and donation system that provided support to those members that were in regions devastated by major hurricanes.
2018	During the 2018 NLC in Dallas, the National Showcase Business Panel is officially adopted featuring a Q&A session with high-profile business partners, including Google, Hewlett-Packard, Social Assurity and Precision Exams.
2019	BPA Unveils New Logo: This is the first major brand refresh for BPA in over 30 years and helps guide the organization into the 21st century. The updates include a new logo, tagline, design approach and brand colors. The new elements will be present on the BPA website, social media channels, communications and marketing.
2020	The BPA Board of Trustees made the decision to cancel the 2020 National Leadership Conference. It was scheduled to be held May 6–10 at the Gaylord National Resort & Convention Center located in Washington, DC This was the first time in the organization's history that the National Leadership Conference had been cancelled.
