= Junior Solar Sprint =

American student engineering competition

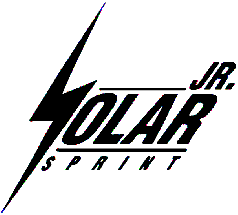
- Abbreviation: JSS; Jr. Solar Sprint
- Founder: National Renewable Energy Laboratory
- Founded at: Golden, Colorado, U.S.
- Type: Student design competition
- Affiliations: Army Educational Outreach Program; Technology Student Association
- Website: www.usaeop.com/programs/competitions/jss/

Junior Solar Sprint (JSS) is a competitive program for 5th- to 8th-grade students to create a small solar-powered vehicle. JSS competitions are sponsored by the Army Educational Outreach Program (AEOP), and administered by the Technology Student Association (TSA). Objectives of JSS are to create the fastest, most interesting, or best crafted vehicle. Skills in science, technology, engineering, and mathematics (STEM) are fostered when designing and constructing the vehicles, as well as principles of alternative fuels, engineering design, and aerodynamics.

== History ==
Junior Solar Sprint was created in the 1980s by the National Renewable Energy Laboratory (NREL) to teach younger children about the importance and challenges of using renewable energy. The project also teaches students how the engineering process is applied, and how solar panels, transmission, and aerodynamics can be used in practice.

Since 2001, the AEOP has funded JSS events. TSA began hosting competitions in 2011, and it became a middle school-level event in 2014. In association with TSA, Pitsco Education has sold recommended materials for the project.

== Competition ==
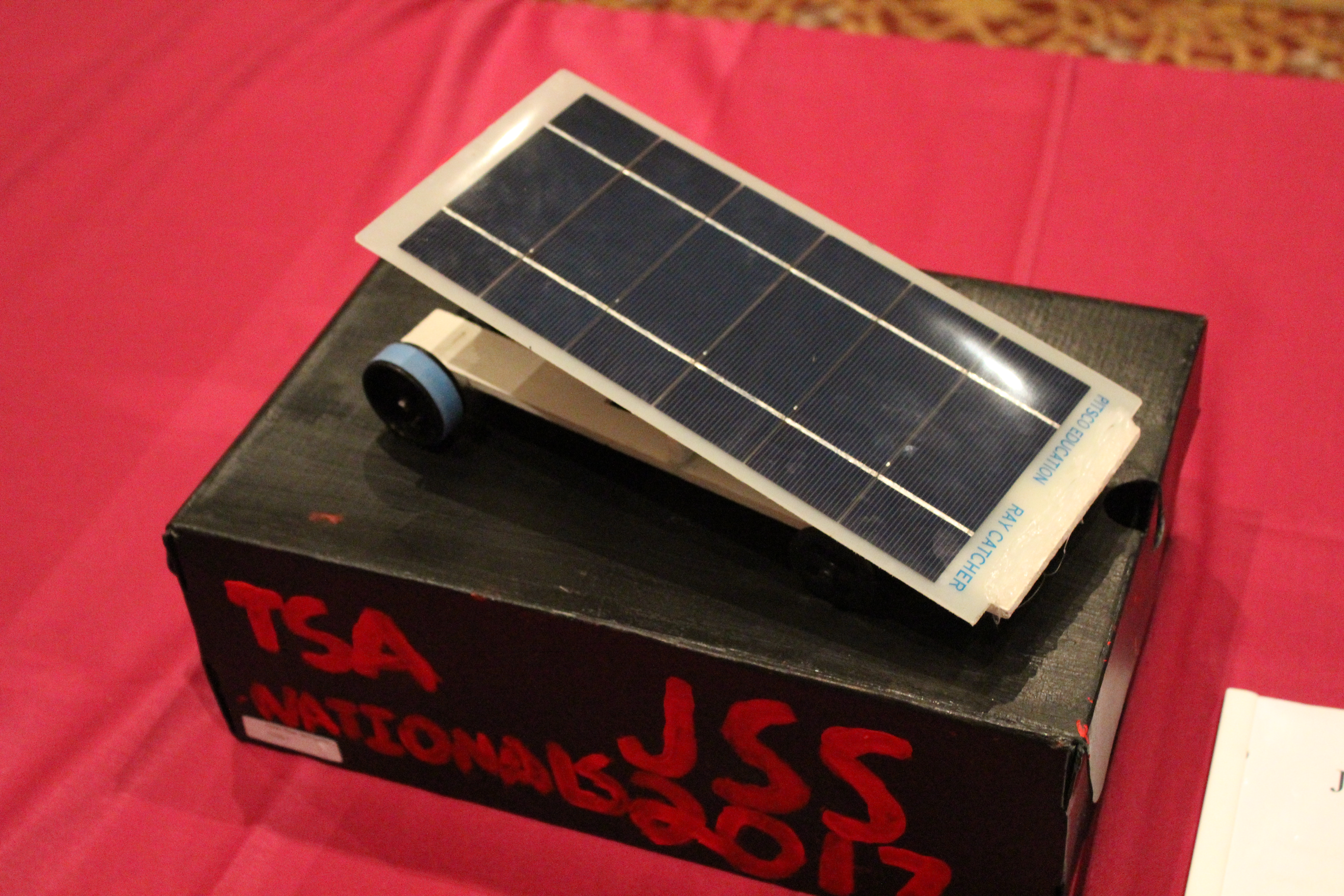
A car created for JSS on its shoebox display at the 2017 national TSA conference

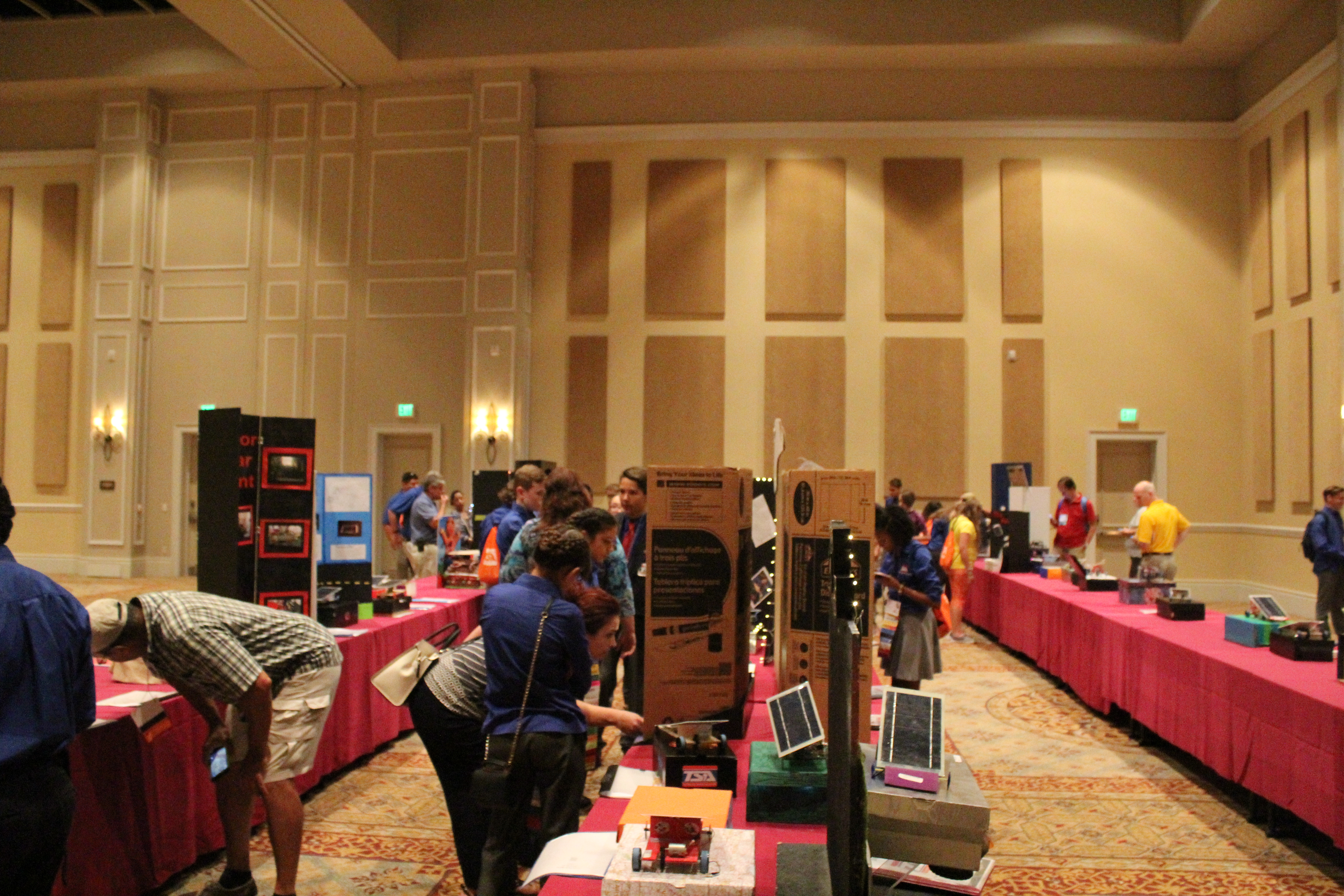
Open viewing for all the JSS entries to the 2017 national TSA conference

Since Junior Solar Sprint became a TSA event, the rules for creating the vehicle have been defined in the TSA rulebook. At the conference, the total cost of creating each car must be less than US$50. The team must also document their process in a notebook.

During the time trials section, each car is raced three times down a lane 65 feet (20 m) long, on a hard surface like a tennis court. To keep the vehicle pointed straight ahead, a guide wire is run across every lane attached by an eyelet. When the cars are racing, they must remain attached to the wire with no external control. During the race, no modifications are allowed, though anyone may watch.

The fastest time of the three trials is used for qualification to the semifinal round. In the next stage, a single- or double-elimination tournament, cars are raced against each other at the same time, until one of the 16 semifinalists is determined the fastest.

Junior Solar Sprint competitions are held at the national-, state-, and some regional-level TSA conferences, as well as other AEOP-hosted locations. In the event that the site is overcast, and the solar panels won't work, two 1.5 volt AA batteries will be given to each team. Judges determine the three best vehicles for each category: speed, craftsmanship, and appearance.

The 2017 national TSA conference was held June 21–25, in Orlando, Florida, and many middle school students across the country traveled to compete with their vehicles. The team from Joan MacQueen Middle School in Alpine, California, won first place.
