= CO2 dragster =

Miniature car propelled by carbon dioxide

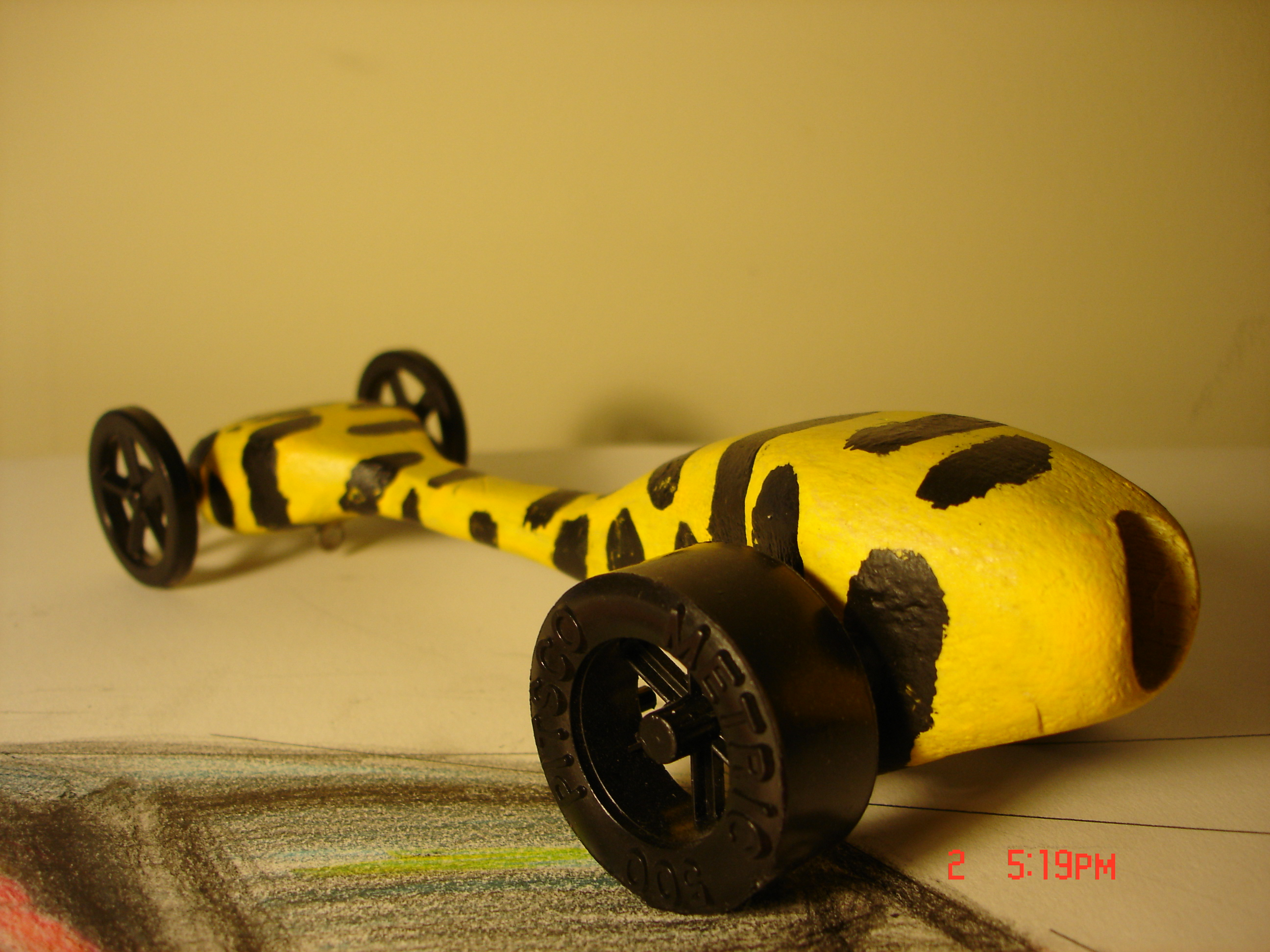
Rear view of a "rail"-style dragster, with external wheels. The hollow container for the carbon dioxide cartridge can be seen towards the rear of the car.

CO_{2} dragsters are cars used as miniature racing cars which are propelled by a carbon dioxide cartridge, pierced to start the release of the gas, and which race on a typically 60 feet (18 metres) track. They are frequently used to demonstrate mechanical principles such as mass, force, acceleration, and aerodynamics. Two hooks (eyelets or screw eyes) linked to a string (usually monofilament fishing line) on the bottom of the car prevent the vehicle from losing control during launch. In a race, a laser scanner records the speed of the car at the end of its run. Often, the dragster is carved out of balsa wood because of its light weight and cheapness.

CO_{2} cars are a part of engineering curricula in parts of the world such as Australia, New Zealand and the United States. In the United States, classroom projects and competitions can operate under the aegis of the Technology Student Association at middle school and high school levels. Competitions are sometimes featured in local newspapers. Students learn about the forces of gravity, drag, wind resistance, and the motion of air as a fluid. The projects mainly test the aerodynamic, mass and friction properties of a car. These forces can influence performance in a race, so it is vital to take them into account when building.

An unfinished "shell" dragster, with wheels enclosed within its body

== See also ==
- Pinewood Derby
- F1 in Schools
