= Educators Rising =

American high school group for future educators

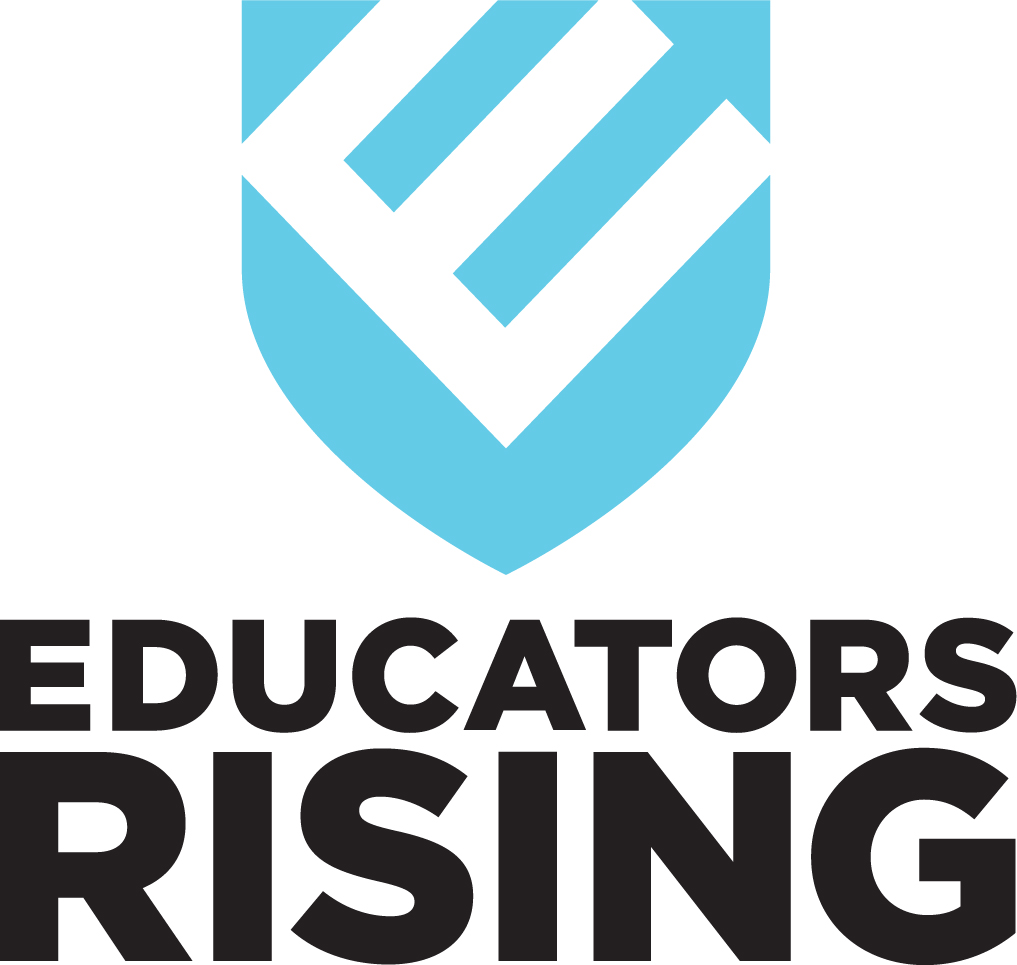
- Abbreviation: EdRising
- Formation: 2015; 11 years ago, Educators Rising; 1994; 32 years ago, Future Educators of America
- Type: Career and Technical Student Organization (CTSO)
- Headquarters: Arlington, Virginia
- Members: 20,000+
- Official language: English, Spanish
- CEO: Jeanie Lee
- COO: Albert Chen
- Chief of Staff: Zoe Lewis
- Parent organization: Phi Delta Kappa International
- Staff: 29
- Website: www.educatorsrising.org
- Formerly called: Future Educators Association; Future Educators of America; Future Teachers of America

The Educators Rising, formerly Future Educators Association or FEA, is a professional organization that supports students who are interested in education-related careers. Through affiliation with local chapters that are registered with the international office, prospective educators have access to scholarship opportunities, as well as age appropriate materials and activities, including a national conference, that help them gain a realistic understanding of the role of the teacher. A division of PDK International, it is the only national pre-collegiate program for prospective teachers and helps students develop the leadership traits found in high-quality educators. The international headquarters of Educators Rising are in Arlington, Virginia.

== National Conference ==
The Educators Rising National Conference provides opportunities for students interested in teaching careers to develop professional skills and connect with other aspiring educators. According to Educators Rising, the conference offers more than 40 breakout sessions, opportunities to network with members from across the country, national competitions that allow students to develop and showcase their teaching skills, and keynote presentations from education leaders. This conference also includes activities that help students explore college programs and recognize their commitment to pursuing careers in education.

== Competitive Events ==
Educators Rising offers competitive events at its national conference, divided into competitions and contests. These events allow students to demonstrate skills related to teaching and education through individual, dual, and team activities. Participants are grouped into divisions based on grade level: Middle School (grades 7-8), Junior Varsity (grades 9-10), Varsity (grades 11-12), and Collegiate (undergraduate students). The divisions available vary by event. In competitions, participants are evaluated using event-specific rubrics and compared with other competitors for placement. Contests use scoring criteria to evaluate entries and determine awards based on performance.
