= Oscar Tingelstad =

American university president (1882–1953)

Oscar Adolf Tingelstad (September 20, 1882 - April 8, 1953) was the president of Pacific Lutheran University in Tacoma, Washington, from 1928 to 1943.

== Biography ==
Tingelstad, the son of Bent and Beret (Livdalen) Tingelstad, was born on a homestead near Eiokson, Cass County, North Dakota (Dakota Territory) on September 20, 1882. In 1892 the family pioneered again, this time to Silverton, Oregon. He passed the eighth grade public school examination in Marion County, Oregon, in 1898 and completed the commercial course at Pacific Lutheran Academy in Parkland on June 1, 1900. Tingelstad attended the Silverton, Oregon, high school during the first year of its operation, 1900–01, and completed the Luther College preparatory course at Pacific Lutheran Academy in 1902. He entered the sophomore class at Luther College, Decorah, Iowa, in September, 1902, and graduated in June, 1905.

Tingelstad entered Luther Seminary in St. Paul, Minnesota, in 1905 and taught summer parochial school in Nelson County, North Dakota, in 1906. He was granted the “testimenium pro candidatura” from Luther Seminary in June, 1907, because of the shortage of pastors in the Norwegian Lutheran Synod and was ordained a Lutheran Pastor at Zion Lutheran Church in Ballard, Washington on July 14, 1907. He served that congregation until August 8, 1909, and also served the Orillia, Port Madison, and Tracyton congregations. He taught parochial school in Ballard during the summer of 1908.

On August 4, 1909, Tingelstad married Alfield Sophie Tvete, in Arlington, Washington.

He attended the University of Chicago the autumn quarter, 1909, and became the first chair of the psychology and education departments at Luther College when he began teaching there in January 1910.

At Luther College, Tingelstad served as acting principal of the Preparatory Department in 1911–12 and 1917–19; as registrar 1914-27; as secretary of the Board of Trustees, 1923–1928; as professor of psychology and education until 1919, and as professor of education, 1919-28.

In 1912 he was elected to membership in Phi Delta Kappa, an honorary education fraternity, at the University of Chicago where he received the A.M. degree in 1915; he served as a fellow in education, 1913–1914; taught general high school methods in the School of Education at University of Chicago in 1925; and was awarded the Ph. D. degree, magna cum laude, in psychology and education at the end of the summer quarter, 1925. The subject of his doctoral dissertation was “The Religious Element in American School Readers up to 1930; A Bibliographical and Statistical Study”.

On August 1, 1928, Tingelstad became president of Pacific Lutheran College (PLC) in Parkland. During his presidency, the institution advanced from a junior college to a senior college status, and accreditation was achieved for both the education department and the liberal arts program. The faculty grew and the enrollment grew from 187 to 551 in the 1930s.

The May Festival started in 1934. It was held on the lawn in front of Old Main at 3:30 in the afternoon, and included maypole dances and crowning of a May Queen followed by a tea for all participants. The first of many visits by Scandinavian royalty occurred when Crown Prince Olav and Crown Princess Märtha visited campus in 1937. That same year, the library was built.

PLC survived the depression in the 1930s without cutting the faculty or reducing programs. But after the outbreak of the World War II, student enrollment dropped dramatically and the financial problems facing the school grew. President Tingelstad resigned in 1943 to give way for a new president to deal with the problems of the school.

He rejoined the staff of Luther College as professor of philosophy and Bible and taught there from 1944 until 1950.

Oscar Tingelstad died April 8, 1953, in Decorah, Iowa.

Tingelstad Hall at Pacific Lutheran University was built in 1967 and named to honor the sixth president of the school.
