= HOSA (organization) =

Healthcare student organization

- Formation: 1976; 50 years ago
- Type: Career and technical student organization
- Headquarters: 548 Silicon Drive, Suite 101; Southlake, Texas 76092; United States
- Members: 300,000
- Executive Director: Bergen Morehouse
- International President: Jeet Sridhar
- Website: http://www.hosa.org/

HOSA – Future Health Professionals, formerly known as Health Occupations Students of America (HOSA), is an international career and technical student organization endorsed by the U.S. Department of Education and the Health Science Technology Education Division of ACTE. HOSA is composed of middle school, secondary, and post-secondary/collegiate students, along with professionals, alumni, and honorary members. It is headquartered in Southlake, Texas, and is the largest student organization that prepares students to enter healthcare and similar fields, with membership in the United States, U.S. Territories, Canada, China, South Korea, and Mexico.

== History ==
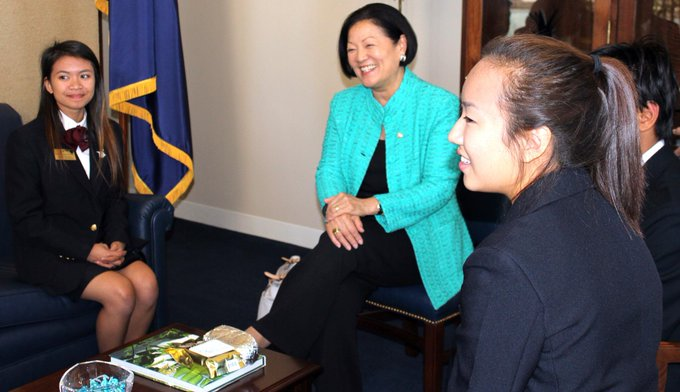
HOSA youth meeting with Senator Mazie Hirono in 2013.

HOSA was founded in 1976 out of a task force from the American Vocational Association in order to determine whether a new student organization accommodating healthcare students was necessary.

From November 4–7, 1975, the State Department of Education and Division of Vocational Education in New Jersey with 18 representatives from Alabama, New Jersey, New Mexico, North Carolina, Oklahoma and Texas voted to form the American Health Occupations Education Student Organization.

On November 10–13, 1976, in a constitutional convention held at the Inn of the Six Flags in Arlington, Texas AHOESO adopted bylaws, which also changed the organization's name to Health Occupations Students of America; elected national leaders; selected colors and a motto; made plans to design an emblem; and set the first National Leadership Conference for the spring of 1978 in Oklahoma City, Oklahoma.

In 2004, the organization dropped the acronym from its name, and began publishing all documents under the brand "HOSA – Future Health Professionals."

== Chartered Associations ==
As of 2026, HOSA has grown to more than 55 chartered associations in several countries, including the United States and its territories, Canada, China, South Korea, and Türkiye. HOSA's chartered associations are:

- Alabama HOSA
- Alaska HOSA
- American Samoa HOSA
- Arizona HOSA
- Arkansas HOSA
- California HOSA
- Canada HOSA
- China HOSA
- Colorado HOSA
- Connecticut HOSA
- Delaware HOSA
- District of Columbia HOSA
- Florida HOSA
- Georgia HOSA
- Germany HOSA
- Hawaii HOSA
- Idaho HOSA
- Illinois HOSA
- India HOSA
- Indiana HOSA
- Iowa HOSA
- Italy HOSA
- Kansas HOSA
- Kentucky HOSA
- Korea HOSA
- Louisiana HOSA
- Maine HOSA
- Malaysia HOSA
- Maryland HOSA
- Massachusetts HOSA
- Mexico HOSA
- Michigan HOSA
- Minnesota HOSA
- Mississippi HOSA
- Mississippi PS/C
- Missouri HOSA
- Montana HOSA
- Nebraska HOSA
- Nevada HOSA
- New Hampshire HOSA
- New Jersey HOSA
- New Mexico HOSA
- New York HOSA
- North Carolina HOSA
- North Dakota HOSA
- Ohio HOSA
- Oklahoma HOSA
- Oregon HOSA
- Pennsylvania HOSA
- Philippines HOSA
- Puerto Rico HOSA
- Rhode Island HOSA
- South Carolina HOSA
- South Dakota HOSA
- Tennessee HOSA
- Texas HOSA
- Trinidad and Tobago HOSA
- Türkiye HOSA
- Utah HOSA
- Vermont HOSA
- Vietnam HOSA
- Virginia HOSA
- Washington HOSA
- West Virginia HOSA
- Wisconsin HOSA

== Mission Statement ==
The mission of HOSA is to empower HOSA-Future Health Professionals to become leaders in the global health community through education, collaboration, and experience.

== Uniform ==
The official HOSA uniform consists of a navy-blue suit with maroon accent in the form of a tie for men or a bowtie for women. The HOSA emblem is affixed to the suit jacket.

== International Leadership Conferences (ILCs) ==
2003 ILC in Atlanta

Members meet annually at an International Leadership Conference (formerly known as the National Leadership Conference (NLC) until 2016), held in late June in cities across the United States. Selected major cities for hosting the conference rotate every few years. Over 7,500 students participate in general sessions, competitive events, and leadership experiences, all while networking with health sciences students representing nearly all 50 states and countries including Canada, China, and Mexico.

Previous and scheduled upcoming ILCs
Year	Dates	Convention center	City
1978	April 27-30	Lincoln Plaza Inn	Oklahoma City, Oklahoma
1979	June 26-July 1	—	Cherry Hill, New Jersey
1980	July 8-12	—	Asheville, North Carolina
1981	June 25-28	—	Albuquerque, New Mexico
1982	June 24-26	—	Chicago, Illinois
1983	—	—	San Antonio, Texas
1984	June 27-30	—	Orlando, Florida
1985	—	—	Nashville, Tennessee
1986	July 4-6	—	Philadelphia, Pennsylvania
1987	June 24-27	—	Dallas, Texas
1988	June 15-18	—	Atlanta, Georgia
1989	June 21-24	Salt Palace Convention Center	Salt Lake City, Utah
1990	June 20-23	—	Orlando, Florida
1991	June 26-30	—	Washington, D.C.
1992	June 17-20	—	Anaheim, California
1993	June 16-20	Opryland Hotel	Nashville, Tennessee
1994	June 22-25	Opryland Hotel	Nashville, Tennessee
1995	June 14-17	—	Louisville, Kentucky
1996	June 26-29	—	Chicago, Illinois
1997	June 18-21	—	Anaheim, California
1998	June 24-27	Disney Coronado Springs Resort	Orlando, Florida
1999	June 23-26	Opryland Hotel	Nashville, Tennessee
2000	June 18-22	—	Cleveland, Ohio
2001	June 12-15	—	Atlanta, Georgia
2002	June 26–29	Anaheim Hilton and Marriott	Anaheim, California
2003	June 18–21	Atlanta Marriott, Hyatt, and Hilton	Atlanta, Georgia
2004	June 23-26	Marriott World Center	Orlando, Florida
2005	June 22-25	Gaylord Opryland Hotel	Nashville, Tennessee
2006	June 21-24	Anaheim Hilton and Marriott	Anaheim, California
2007	June 20-23	Marriott World Center	Orlando, Florida
2008	June 18-21	Adam’s Mark Hotel	Dallas, Texas
2009	June 24-27	Gaylord Opryland Hotel	Nashville, Tennessee
2010	June 23-26	Disney's Coronado Springs Resort	Orlando, Florida
2011	June 22-25	Hilton Anaheim	Anaheim, California
2012	June 20-23	Disney's Coronado Springs Resort	Orlando, Florida
2013	June 26-30	Gaylord Opryland Hotel	Nashville, Tennessee
2014	June 25-28	Disney's Coronado Springs Resort	Orlando, Florida
2015	June 24-27	Hilton Anaheim	Anaheim, California
2016	June 22-25	Gaylord Opryland Hotel	Nashville, Tennessee
2017	June 21-24	Disney's Coronado Springs Resort	Orlando, Florida
2018	June 27-30	Dallas Convention Center	Dallas, Texas
2019	June 19-22	Disney's Coronado Springs Resort	Orlando, Florida
2020	June 24-27	Virtual ILC	Dallas, Texas (Virtual)
2021	June 23-26	Virtual ILC	Orlando, Florida (Virtual)
2022	June 22-25	Gaylord Hotel and Convention Center	Nashville, Tennessee
2023	June 21-24	Dallas Convention Center	Dallas, Texas
2024	June 26-29	George R. Brown Convention Center	Houston, Texas
2025	June 18-21	Gaylord Hotel and Convention Center	Nashville, Tennessee
2026	June 17-20	Indianapolis Convention Center/ Lucas Oil Stadium	Indianapolis, Indiana
2027	June 22-25	Pennsylvania Convention Center	Philadelphia, Pennsylvania
2028	June 28-July 1	George R. Brown Convention Center	Houston, Texas
2029	June 26-30	Orange County Convention Center	Orlando, Florida
2030	TBD	TBD	TBD
2031	June 25-June 28	Kay Bailey Hutchison Convention Center	Dallas, Texas
2032	June 21-June 26	Orange County Convention Center	Orlando, Florida

== Competitive Events ==
HOSA offers 82 competitive events, ranging from skill-based to leadership and team-based. The event groups are as follows: Health science, health professions, leadership, and recognition events. Members compete at the regional, state, and international levels. Those who place in the top three positions at the state level are given the opportunity to compete at the international level.

== Bibliography ==
- "Student Membership Handbook" (PDF). Health Occupations Students of America. Archived from the original (PDF) on 2010-07-10.
