= Pi Lambda Theta =

American honor and professional society for educators

- ΠΛΘ
- Founded: July 7, 1917; 109 years ago Columbia, Missouri
- Type: Honor and Professional
- Affiliation: PDK International
- Former affiliation: PFA
- Status: Active
- Emphasis: Education
- Scope: National
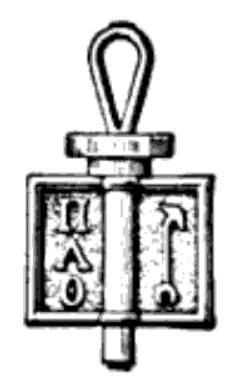
- Member badge
- Colors: Gold
- Chapters: 67
- Members: 185,000+ lifetime
- Headquarters: PO Box 13090; Arlington, Virginia 22219; United States
- Website: pilambda.org

Pi Lambda Theta (ΠΛΘ) is an American education honor society and professional association. It was established in 1917 in Columbia, Missouri. It is a affiliated with PDK International.

== History ==
Pi Lambda Theta was organized as a national association on July 7, 1917, by representatives of seven local women's education honor associations. Its founders, their schools and eventual chapters were:

- Louise Nardin, University of Missouri, (Alpha chapter)
- Ruth Austin, Syracuse University, (Beta chapter)
- Helen Rhoda Hoopes, University of Kansas, (Gamma chapter)
- Iva Testerman Spangler, University of Kansas, (Gamma chapter)
- Mary Jane Chambers Dury, University of Pittsburgh, (Delta chapter)
- Katharine Foulke, University of Pittsburgh, (Delta chapter)
- Helen Larsen Stevens, University of Minnesota, (Epsilon chapter)
- Virginia Athen Noland, University of Washington, (Zeta chapter)
- Ruth Immel, University of Pennsylvania, (Eta chapter)

These local societies formed in response to the recent establishment of similar men's honor fraternities for education, with the oldest of the women's groups, at Missouri, dating to 1910, which is recognized as its founding year. From the start, organizers recognized the advantages of combining their efforts into a national organization.

Through correspondence and some exchange of representatives, the seven learned of each other and their shared interests, culminating in an invitation by the Missouri group to meet in conference at Columbia, Missouri. The national fraternity was established at this time, a constitution written, submitted to the seven chapters, and approved by the last of these on March 3, 1918. From its early days the fraternity has opted for a model that combines aspects of an honor society (more stringent GPA requirements) with an ongoing professional advocacy program, intended to advance education as a profession.

Pi Lambda Theta is both an honor society and professional association for educators. As an honor society, its purpose is to recognize persons of superior scholastic achievement and high potential for professional leadership. As a professional association, its purpose is to stimulate independent-thinking educators who can ask critical questions to improve educational policies and practices.

Pi Lambda Theta's mission is to honor outstanding educators and inspire their leadership on critical education issues. PLT extends membership to students majoring in education who demonstrate academic excellence, as well as to professional educators who have earned a PLT-recognized award such as certification by the National Board for Professional Teaching Standards in the United States.

By 1975 the restriction on men was lifted, and Pi Lambda Theta has been co-educational since that time. Some time after 1990, Pi Lambda Theta became a member of the Phi Delta Kappa International family of education associations. It is a former member of the Professional Fraternity Association. In 2025, the organization has established 67 chapters and has initiated more than 185,000 members.

== Symbols ==
Pi Lambda Theta's color is gold. Its members may wear a gold cord at graduation. Members also receive an initiation pin. Its publication was called Pi Lambda Theta Journal from 1926 to 1953 and Educational Horizons from 1953 to 2015.

== Membership ==
Pi Lambda Theta requires that candidates have a 3.5 GPA or higher. Candidates are accepted from the following categories:

- Undergraduate students with a minimum of 60 credit hours, recent graduates, or graduate students who intend to pursue a career in education; or
- Current educators or education professionals/support staff who have completed at least a bachelor's degree.

As such, Pi Lambda Theta members may choose to participate in PDK during and after graduation, with programs within the field of education. Membership in PDK requires a one-time lifetime membership fee or annual fees based on membership type.

== Governance ==
Pi Lambda Theta is a wholly owned subsidiary of PDK International, a professional association for educators. It is governed by the PDK International Board of Directors. Its headquarters is based in Arlington, Virginia.
