= E. Mark Stern =

American psychologist

Erwin Mark Stern (December 5, 1929 – March 11, 2014) was a humanistic/existential psychologist.

== Biography ==
He was born on December 5, 1929, in New York City.

He holds a Master of Science (M.S.) degree from the Pennsylvania State University (1953) and a Doctor of Education (Ed.D.) degree from Teachers College, Columbia University (1955) and a Certificate in Psychoanalysis from the Training Institute of the National Psychological Association for Psychoanalysis (1958). Stern served for many years from Associate Professor to Full Professor and finally Professor Emeritus of Pastoral and Family Counseling in the Graduate Faculty of Arts and Sciences of Iona College, New Rochelle. He was at various times Adjunct Professor of Psychology at Seton Hall University in South Orange, New Jersey, Fordham University in New York, and the Australian Catholic University. He was also a Fellow and Faculty Member of the American Institute of Psychotherapy and Psychoanalysis in New York City as well as the Training Institute for Mental Health Practitioners, also in New York. In later years, he was a guest instructor at the Lifetime Learning Institute of Bard College, Annandale-on-Hudson, New York.

Stern served as Editor of the Journal of Pastoral Counseling (published by Iona College), Voices: the Journal of the American Academy of Psychotherapists and was founding Editor of the Psychotherapy Patient published by the Haworth Press. He was also coauthor (with Bert Marino, Ph.D.) of Psychotheology, published by the Paulist Press; editor of The Other Side of the Couch" What Therapist Believe, published by Pilgrim Press and other books and articles in psychology and psychoanalytic periodicals as well as chapters in anthologies.

He was president of two divisions of the American Psychological Association: the Psychology of Religion (Division 36) and the Society for Humanistic Psychology (Division 32). He served four non-consecutive terms on the APA's Council of Representatives. He was a Fellow of the American Psychological Association and the Association for Psychological Science. The Division of the Psychology of Religion presented him with the Virginia Sexton Mentoring Award and the Distinguished Service Award and the Society of Humanistic Psychology the Humanistic Psychology, the Carl Rogers Award for Outstanding Contributions to the Profession and Practice of Humanistic Psychology as well as the Lifetime Award for Contributions to the Society of Humanistic Psychology (subsequently named the Mike Arons/E. Mark Stern Award).

He was a licensed psychologist in the State of New York, a Diplomate in Clinical Psychology of the American Board of Professional Psychology and a member of Psi Chi the National Honor Society in Psychology and Phi Delta Kappa, a professional fraternity in education.

In his semi-retirement Stern was a legislative appointee to the Dutchess County Mental Health Commission while continuing a limited practice in humanistic and existential psychotherapy.

Stern died on March 11, 2014, in Clinton Corners, Dutchess County, New York.

== Bibliography ==
Further lectures

- Shorteven J. Hendlin (2014). "A Soul Filled with Grace: E. Mark Stern (December 5, 1929—March 11, 2014)" (pdf). Humanistic Psychologist. 42 (2): 227–230. doi:10.1080/08873267.2014.907086. ISSN 0887-3267. Archived from the original on 29 July 2024.
- Hendrika Vande Kemp (December 1914). "E. Mark stern (1929-2014)". American Psychologist. 69 (9): 932. doi:10.1037/a0038226. PMID 25494993.
- Joseph Nicolosi; A. Dean Byrd; Richard W. Potts (June 2000). "Retrospective Self-Reports of Changes in Homosexual Orientation: A Consumer Survey of Conversion Therapy Clients". Psychological Reports. 86 (3_part_2): 1071–1088. doi:10.1177/003329410008600302.2. Archived from the original on 29 July 2024., that quotes the following article: Stern A. M. (1998) The battle against the A.P.A. resolution: interview with E. Mark Stern. NARTH Bulletin, 6(2), 3, 19–20.
