= Family, Career and Community Leaders of America =

American National Non-profit CTSO

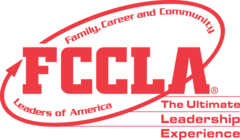
- Abbreviation: FCCLA
- Formation: June 11, 1945 (81 years ago)
- Founded at: Chicago, Illinois
- Type: CTSO
- Tax ID no.: 53-0178290
- Legal status: 501(c)(3) non-profit organization
- Headquarters: Herndon, Virginia
- Region served: United States; American Samoa; Puerto Rico; US Virgin Islands
- Members: 257,000+
- Official language: English
- Chief Executive Officer: Sandy Spavone
- National President: Graham Mull (GA)
- National First Vice President: Natalie Fannon (VA)
- Website: fcclainc.org
- Formerly called: FHA, FHA-HERO

The Family, Career and Community Leaders of America (FCCLA, formerly known as the Future Homemakers of America, FHA) is a national 501(c)(3) nonprofit career and technical student organization for young men and women in family and consumer sciences education through grade 12 and postsecondary students. FCCLA offers intra-curricular resources and opportunities for students to pursue careers that support families. The organization was founded in 1945 and currently has over 244,000 student members and more than 7,300 chapter advisers across 5,300 chapters. Facing segregation, African Americans formed the New Homemakers of America until integration after passage of the civil rights act in the 1960s.

FCCLA's stated purpose is "To promote personal growth and leadership development through family and consumer sciences education. Focusing on the multiple roles of family member, wage earner and community leader, members develop skills for life through: character development, creative and critical thinking, interpersonal communication, practical knowledge, and career preparation." FCCLA helps students and teachers focus on various youth concerns, including parenting, family relationships, substance abuse, peer pressure, sustainability, nutrition and fitness, teen violence, life skills, and career preparation.

== History ==
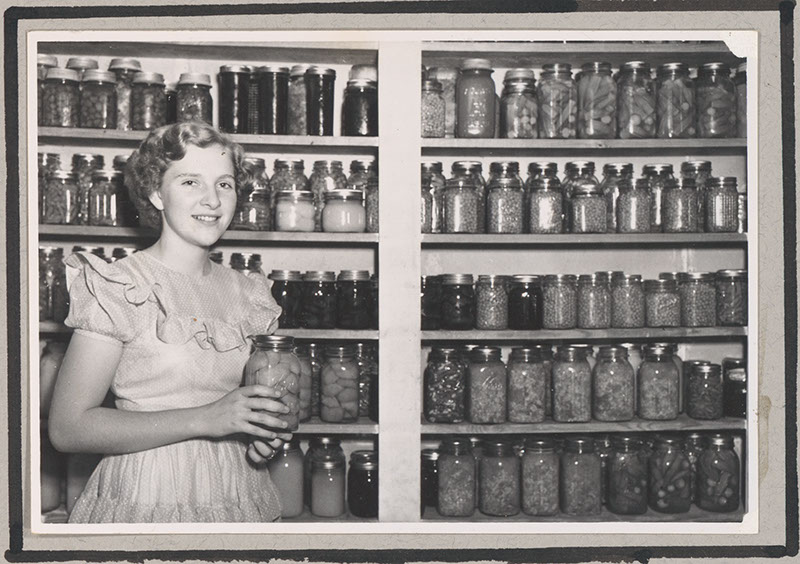
Photograph of a member of the Future Homemakers of America posing with home-canned produce in Clarkesville, Georgia, 1950

The American Home Economics Association and Office of Education co-sponsored a national organization of high school clubs focused on home economics. The organization's name, creed, and motto were decided by the teenagers themselves. The focus groups chose "Future Homemakers of America". For the southern states that had segregation, a sister organization was created for African Americans, called the "New Homemakers of America". In the summer of 1945, Future Homemakers had over 90,000 members and New Homemakers had nearly 20,000. Four years later, the combined groups had 250,000 members. The first national meeting was held in Kansas City, Missouri in July, 1948.

The New Homemakers of America merged with the Future Homemakers of America in 1965 as racial segregation came to an end with the passing of the Civil Rights Act of 1964. In 1966, Future Homemakers of America's membership peaked at 607,175.

In 1973, males were permitted to join FHA for the first time. The organization's first male national officer, Toney Bingham from Washington, D.C., was elected in July 1973. In December 1977, Rhode Island was the last of the 53 state associations (including the Washington, D.C., Puerto Rico, and the Virgin Islands) to affiliate.

In July 1980, the national board of directors approved the purchase of land on which to build a national headquarters and leadership center in Reston, Virginia. The national headquarters and leadership center was dedicated during the 1983 National Leadership Meeting in Washington, D.C.. In the fall, National FHA began hosting a series of regional Cluster Meetings across the United States. STAR Events were introduced. The first three STAR Events developed were Job Interview, Illustrated Talk, and Chapter Activities.

Monya Frazier from Florence, South Carolina was elected as the organization's first African American national president in July 1981. In July 1986, Thomas Lucas from Milton, West Virginia was elected the organization's first male national president. FHA celebrated its 50th anniversary in 1995, during which 76 honorees were inducted into FHA's Leadership Hall of Fame at the National Leadership Conference in Washington, D.C..

In July 1999, voting delegates at the National Leadership Conference in Boston, Massachusetts voted in favor of the proposed name change from the Future Homemakers of America to the "Family, Career and Community Leaders of America". The organization's articles of incorporation, bylaws, mission statement, creed, and purposes were revised following the conclusion of the 1999 Business Session to better reflect the new organization.

In September 2003, "The Ultimate Leadership Experience," tagline was adopted. Two years later, in September, the first all four-color Teen Times magazine was sent to all nationally affiliated FCCLA members. In September 2009, the FCCLA/LifeSmarts Knowledge Bowl was introduced as a new competitive event. In July 2011, the FCCLA Leadership Academy was launched for FCCLA members seeking leadership development. In September 2011, the online STAR Events and a new type of Competitive Event, called Skill Demonstration Events, were included in the newly named Competitive Events Guide. In July 2015, FCCLA hosted a "70 Years Strong" anniversary rally on Capitol Hill, advocating for improved home economics education in schools.

FCCLA had its 75th anniversary in 2020. Due to the COVID-19 pandemic, the National Leadership Conferences in 2020 and 2021 were held virtually, though some functions such as the 2021 national officer elections were hosted in person in Nashville, Tennessee. On August 28, 2023, FCCLA opened its new national headquarters in Herndon, Virginia.

== Conferences and events ==
=== Capitol Leadership ===
Capitol Leadership allows members to travel to Washington, D.C. to advocate for FCS education. Members discuss issues supporting FCCLA's Mission and learn how to become better leaders. Attendees have a chance to connect with their state's representatives to the United States Senate and House of Representatives to share about the importance of FCCLA and home economics. (Capitol Leadership is not held in the same years as US presidential elections.)

=== Fall Leadership Institutes ===
The national board of directors has temporarily replaced the National Fall Conference for the 2024-2025 year with 2 Fall Leadership Institutes. In the fall of 2024, FCCLA is offering 2 new leadership training opportunities to a limited number of affiliated members and advisers. FCCLA has joined forces with the Disney Imagination Campus at both Anaheim and Orlando parks to offer Disney Experiences-led teamwork sessions.

=== National Fall Conference ===
The National Fall Conference (NFC) is scheduled in the late fall and is held in a different city each year. Students and advisers convene to share ideas, learn about exciting programs, leadership skills, and compete in various skill demonstration events.

=== Chapter Adviser Summit ===
The Chapter Adviser Summit (CAS) provides FCCLA Chapter Advisers with a wealth of professional development opportunities designed specifically for home economics education teachers looking to excel in the classroom and in FCCLA. The CAS is developed and led by FCCLA's National Staff and the National Consultant Team.

=== National Leadership Conference ===
The National Leadership Conference (NLC) is the largest FCCLA conference of the year with over 8,000+ attendees from across the United States and its territories. Each year, the NLC is held in a different city. At the NLC, members learn and practice family and consumer sciences skills, conduct the official business of the organization, and network with members from across the nation.

== National programs ==
FCCLA offers eight peer-to-peer educational programs. Each National Program is designed to be integrated into the FCS classroom.

- Career Connection
- Community Service
- FACTS (Families Acting For Community Traffic Safety)
- Families First
- Financial Fitness
- Power of One
- Stand Up
- Student Body

Each national program comes with resources, including lesson plans, activities, and project ideas for integration into FCS classrooms.

=== Awards and scholarships ===
Scholarships will be awarded to competitive event participants in select events and levels. Collegiate scholarships are offered by partners and are not administered by FCCLA. Final tuition scholarship award amounts and additional qualification requirements are determined by the sponsoring partner.

=== Knowledge Bowl ===
FCCLA/LifeSmarts Knowledge Bowl is a team competition that challenges students' knowledge in six content areas:

- Personal finance
- Consumer rights and responsibilities (to include family, career and community studies)
- Technology (to include fashion and housing design)
- Health and safety (to include food sciences and nutrition, and early childhood and human development)
- Environment (to include hospitality, tourism and recreation)
- FCCLA knowledge

Questions come from a variety of sources. Preparation resources include resources found in home economics textbooks, reference guides, content area websites, the National FCCLA website, and other local or online resources.

=== Online Challenge Tests ===
Online Challenge Tests provide opportunities for FCCLA members to demonstrate college- and career-readiness skills in home economics and related occupations. Members will demonstrate skills learned in their FCS courses and through their involvement in FCCLA by taking one of many online challenge tests covering state and national FCS standards.

FCCLA will be piloting the opportunity for attendees to participate in challenge tests at the 2024 National Leadership Conference in Seattle, Washington. These Competitive Event opportunities do not require state-level qualifications, and all members registered to attend the National Leadership Conference can participate as long as they meet all event and level requirements.

=== Skill Demonstration Events ===
Skill Demonstration Events provide opportunities for FCCLA members to demonstrate college-and career-readiness skills in home economics and related occupations. Members will use event criteria to demonstrate skills learned in their FCS courses and through their involvement in FCCLA. These events may serve as an introduction to FCCLA's Competitive Events and require a shorter time commitment than STAR Event's projects.

=== STAR Events ===
Students Taking Action with Recognition (STAR) Events are Competitive Events in which members compete at the regional/district, state, and national levels. Students are recognized for proficiency and achievement in chapter and individual projects, leadership skills, and career preparation. STAR Events allow students to compete individually or as a team. There are more than 30 STAR Events students can choose to compete in, all of which recognize participants who demonstrate their knowledge, skills, and abilities to actively identify an issue concerning families, careers, or communities, research the topic, and develop and implement a project to advocate for positive change. STAR Events offer individual skill development and application of learning through the following activities:

- Cooperative – teams work to accomplish specific goals
- Individualized – an individual member works alone to accomplish specific goals
- Competitive – individual or team performance is measured by an established set of criteria

Online STAR Events focus on integrating home economics content through digital delivery. The top 15 entries in each event and level will qualify to compete at the National Leadership Conference.

=== Virtual Business Challenge ===
The FCCLA/Knowledge Matters Virtual Business Challenges (Personal Finance and Fashion) encourage FCCLA members to test their personal finance or fashion management skills! Participants will utilize a competition version of the Virtual Business classroom software.

The Virtual Business Challenge focuses on different concepts found within the simulation. FCCLA members will not be able to control every concept, and are only able to manipulate the actions enabled for that specific challenge. All other concepts will be set adequately and controlled for the teams. Assignments explaining Challenge goals and objectives will be available within the competition files.

=== Programs ===
==== Say Yes To FCS ====
Say Yes to FCS is a national outreach campaign designed to bring attention to home economics education as a valuable and viable career path. The campaign hosts activities like signing ceremonies, competitions, and educator awareness days.

==== National Outreach Project ====
Each year Family, Career and Community Leaders of America (FCCLA) establishes a National Outreach Project with a partner organization to reach to the community and help work towards a cause. The National Outreach Project is a national community service activity that gives our state delegations/members the opportunity to make a united impact concerning a need that the National Executive Council decides to address.

FCCLA started the National Outreach Project at the 1997 National Leadership Meeting in San Diego, California where 38 states participated in donating over 6,000 various items to shelters/agencies in San Diego. The focus of the project changed over the years to focus on the needs of each community where FCCLA chapters are located. Members are now encouraged to focus on the needs of their local community. The success continues year to year and today FCCLA is still working toward donating money.

==== Japanese Exchange Program ====
FCCLA offers a six-week exchange program that allows member to learn in Japan.

==== Youth Scholarships ====
FCCLA, along with FCCLA's generous partners and sponsors, awards over $13,500,000 in scholarships and awards annually. FCCLA members are strongly encouraged to apply for the youth scholarship opportunities.

== National board of directors ==
The national board of directors is the legal governing body of the Family, Career and Community Leaders of America. FCCLA's board of directors has seven members elected by related organizations and groups, six members ex-officio, four youth members, and two members-at-large elected by the board. The total number of board members shall not exceed 19. The primary functions of the board of directors are to set policies related to program, personnel, and fiscal matters and to be responsible for sound management. FCCLA's executive director serves as the chief administrative officer of the organization. The board receives and acts upon the recommendations of the Executive Director relative to the management of personnel, program, and fiscal matters. FCCLA's Executive Director also serves on the board of directors but does not have the power to cast a vote.

== National Executive Council and national officers ==
Ten youth leaders elected annually at FCCLA’s National Leadership Conference make up the National Executive Council and serve a one-year term as the representative body of FCCLA. The National Executive Council’s primary function is program development, program implementation, and public relations.

FCCLA's national officers serve as the highest level of leadership within the organization, responsible for guiding and shaping the future of FCCLA's programs and initiatives. These youth leaders are elected annually at the National Leadership Conference to serve as the voice of FCCLA's more than 245,000 members nationwide.

As members of the National Executive Council, national officers play a role in program development, program implementation, and public relations.
