= Technology Student Association =

Student organization focused on STEM fields

- Abbreviation: TSA
- Formation: 1978; 48 years ago
- Type: Youth organization, Career and technical student organization
- Legal status: 501(c)(3) non-profit organization
- Headquarters: 1904 Association Drive Reston, Virginia
- Region served: United States
- Members: 300,000+ students 2,700+ chapters
- National Student President: Leona Ghirmai
- TSA Inc. Board President: Alison Goeke
- Executive Director: DRosanne White
- Website: tsaweb.org
- Formerly called: American Industrial Arts Student Association (AIASA)

The Technology Student Association (TSA) is a national non-profit career and technical student organization (CTSO) of over 300,000 middle and high school student members engaged in science, technology, engineering, and mathematics (STEM). TSA's mission is to enhance personal development, leadership, and career opportunities in STEM, whereby members apply and integrate these concepts through intracurricular activities, competitions, and related programs.

== Competition ==
Competitive events are separated into middle school and high school levels, with students competing only with their respective age group. Competitions take place at the local, regional, state, and national level. A component of leadership is often entailed in events at both levels, with some events being devoted to leadership (such as Leadership Strategies MS).

All TSA competitions are correlated with national science, technology, engineering and mathematics and business standards. Sample middle school events include Biotechnology, Career Prep, Video Game Design, and Inventions and Innovations. High school events include Animatronics, Computer Aided Design (CAD), Dragster Design, Promotional Design, System Control Technology, Flight Endurance, Software Development, and Webmaster. For the 2022–2023 season Audio Podcasting, Drone Challenge (UAV), and Virtual Reality Visualization were added as high school events and the Cybersecurity event was removed. For the 2024-2025 season, Robotics and STEM Mass Media were added as high school events and VEX Robotics and Essays on Technology were removed.

Scores are based upon a nationally developed rubric. Winners are chosen based on these scores. In many events, semi-finalists (top 12) move onto a second round of competition which usually involves an interview with the judges about the project. First, second, and third-place winners are awarded a trophy, and finalists (top 10) are recognized at the national level.

=== Program initiatives ===
The Technology Student Association has partnered with many groups to promote other skills. Junior Solar Sprint is a national program allows students to design solar-powered cars. Tests of Engineering Aptitude, Mathematics, and Science (TEAMS) is an annual one-day competition. TSA has partnered with the VEX Robotics Competition to allow students to design and create robots to complete specific tasks. UNITE is a summer program funded by the U.S. Army Research Office that encourages high school students to pursue engineering careers.

== History ==
TSA became an independent organization in 1978, when AIASA Inc. was formed to oversee the activities of the American Industrial Arts Student Association. Between the foundation of AIASA as an independent organization (it had formerly been a part of the American Industrial Arts Association) and 1988, the association grew and began to take shape.

In 1988, the AIASA changed its name to the Technology Student Association as part of a shift in focus from industrial arts to mainstream technology. This action followed a similar name change by the Texas state delegation the previous year. In 1989, the official logo, submitted by a chapter advisor, was adopted. In 1990, the logo received a trademark from the U.S. Patent and Trademark Office.

Today, the association has grown to include more than 300,000 members in more than 2,300 secondary schools across 48 states. It has established an Honor Society, manages numerous competitive events and has partnerships with several organizations. Since TSA was chartered in 1978, more than five million students have participated as members.

As part of its national service project, TSA has a partnership with the American Cancer Society (ACS). TSA members raise money to help fund research, education, advocacy, and patient support. The ACS presents Spirit of Service awards to chapters that participate in fundraising.

== National conferences ==
Students elect a National Officer team annually at the Technology Student Association national conference. The 2023 national conference was held at the Kentucky International Convention Center in Louisville, Kentucky. The 2024 national conference was held at the Rosen Shingle Creek Resort in Orlando, Florida. The 2025 national conference was held at the Gaylord Opryland Resort & Convention Center in Nashville, Tennessee. The 2026 national conference was held at The Gaylord National Resort & Convention Center in Washington, D.C. / National Harbor, Maryland.

== Notable alumni ==
- Hunter Hayes - Country singer and music star, Tennessee TSA
- Andy Hertzfeld - Member of the original Macintosh development team and computer entrepreneur
- Chad Hurley - Co-founder of YouTube, Pennsylvania TSA
- Sal Khan - Founder of Khan Academy, Louisiana TSA
- Carrie Underwood - Country singer and music star, Oklahoma TSA
- Rep. Maxwell Frost - United States Congressman (FL-10), Florida TSA
- Mark Zuckerberg - Founder of Facebook, New York TSA
