= Career and technical student organization =

Vocational organizations

Career and technical student organizations (CTSOs) are vocational organizations primarily based in high schools, colleges and career technology centers. Often, on the state level, they are integrated into departments of education or incorporated as nonprofit organizations. Many states define CTSOs as "integral parts" of the high school and college education programs. Other higher education institutions have added extracurricular activities that are not sports-related, like CTSOs in order to enhance the college experience.

CTSOs prepare students for postsecondary avenues in career and college related areas and offer soft skill development and leadership activities. Many CTSOs also offer students the opportunity to compete at the regional, state, national, and international levels. If an organization wishes to be recognized nationally, they must follow and complete any necessary requirements set forth by National Coordinating Council for Career and Technical Student organizations.

Some major CTSOs include:

- BPA (Business Professionals of America, formerly Office Education Association)
- DECA (formerly Distributive Education Clubs of America)
- Educators Rising (formerly Future Teachers of America)
- FBLA (Future Business Leaders of America)
- FCCLA (Family, Career, and Community Leaders of America) (formerly Future Homemakers of America)
- FFA (formerly Future Farmers of America)
- HOSA-Future Health Professionals (formerly Health Occupations Students of America)
- SkillsUSA (formerly Vocational Industrial Clubs of America)
- TSA (Technology Student Association, formerly American Industrial Arts Student Association)

Another CTSO, International Thespian Society, is recognized by some states.

== See also ==
- Career and Technical Education
