= DECA (organization) =

American nonprofit organization

- Formation: 1946; 80 years ago
- Type: Career and Technical Student Organization (CTSO)
- Legal status: Nonprofit
- Location(s): 1908 Association Drive; Reston, Virginia, 20191–1591; United States
- Members: 300,000+
- President: Lori Hairston
- Executive Director: Frank Peterson
- Staff: 25
- Website: www.deca.org
- Formerly called: Distributive Education Clubs of America

DECA Inc., formerly Distributive Education Clubs of America, is a 501(c)(3) not-for-profit career and technical student organization (CTSO) with more than 300,000 members in all 50 U.S. states, Washington, DC; Australia, Canada, China, Germany, India, Mexico, Poland, Puerto Rico, Spain, and Vietnam. The United States Congress, the United States Department of Education and Department of State, district and international departments of education authorize DECA's programs.

DECA is organized into two unique student divisions each with programs designed to address the learning styles, interests, and focus of its members. The High School Division includes over 292,000 members in over 4,000 schools. The Collegiate Division (referred to as Delta Epsilon Chi until July 1, 2010) includes over 5,400 members in 200+ colleges and universities.

The organization's mission statement is as follows:

DECA prepares emerging leaders and entrepreneurs in marketing, finance, hospitality, and management in high schools and colleges around the globe. The four components of the organization's Comprehensive Learning Program are that DECA integrates into classroom instruction, applies learning, connects to business, and promotes competition. DECA prepares the next generation to be academically prepared, community-oriented, professionally responsible, experienced leaders.

Frank Peterson currently serves as the executive director.

== History ==
DECA Inc. was founded in 1946 in Memphis, Tennessee, taking inspiration from the FFA (Future Farmers of America).

== Governance and partners ==
According to DECA's bylaws, the organization is governed by four primary bodies:

Executive Director: The executive director is responsible for implementing the board's policies, serving as the fiscal agent and primary spokesperson of the organization, and employing such staff as necessary to plan and execute the board's policies. The executive director is Frank Peterson.

Board of Directors: An eleven-member Board of Directors establishes policies relative to the interpretation and implementation of the constitution and bylaws. The current President of the board of directors is Scott Jones and the current President-Elect is Steven Mitchell.

National Advisory Board: DECA's National Advisory Board (NAB) is composed of business partners that provide strategic advice for the organizations, professional insight on content and crucial financial support for programming. The current chair of the NAB is Mike Brown from M & M Productions.

Congressional Advisory Board: DECA's Congressional Advisory Board (CAB) is a bipartisan group of United States Senators and Congressmen and women representing varied political philosophies, but all supporting career and technical student organizations as an integral part of delivering career and technical education to ensure that America's youth are college and career ready.

== Conferences ==
The International Career Development Conference (ICDC) is available to all DECA members. Although only qualifying members may take part in the competitive events series, the conference also offers workshops, academies, and networking for students who wish to further their business skills or learn about business. DECA ICDC is generally held in April or May of each year and 23,000+ members, advisors, and business professionals attend the conference. The location of the conference rotates between three cities: Anaheim, California; Atlanta, Georgia; and Orlando, Florida.

Competition hierarchy:

- Regional (in some areas, this is known as Area Competition or District Competition)
- State Career Development Conference (SCDC)
- International Career Development Conference (ICDC)

Other conferences include:

- Association Fall Leadership Conferences
- Association Career Development Conferences (CDC)
- Central Region Leadership Conference (CRLC)
- Emerging Leader Summit (ELS; formerly WROTC & SOLT)
- Sports and Entertainment Marketing Conference (SEM)
- The Ultimate DECA Power Trip
- Western Region Leadership Conference (WRLC)
- Collegiate DECA Engage
- Collegiate DECA International Career Development Conference (CICDC)

== High School Division Competitive events ==
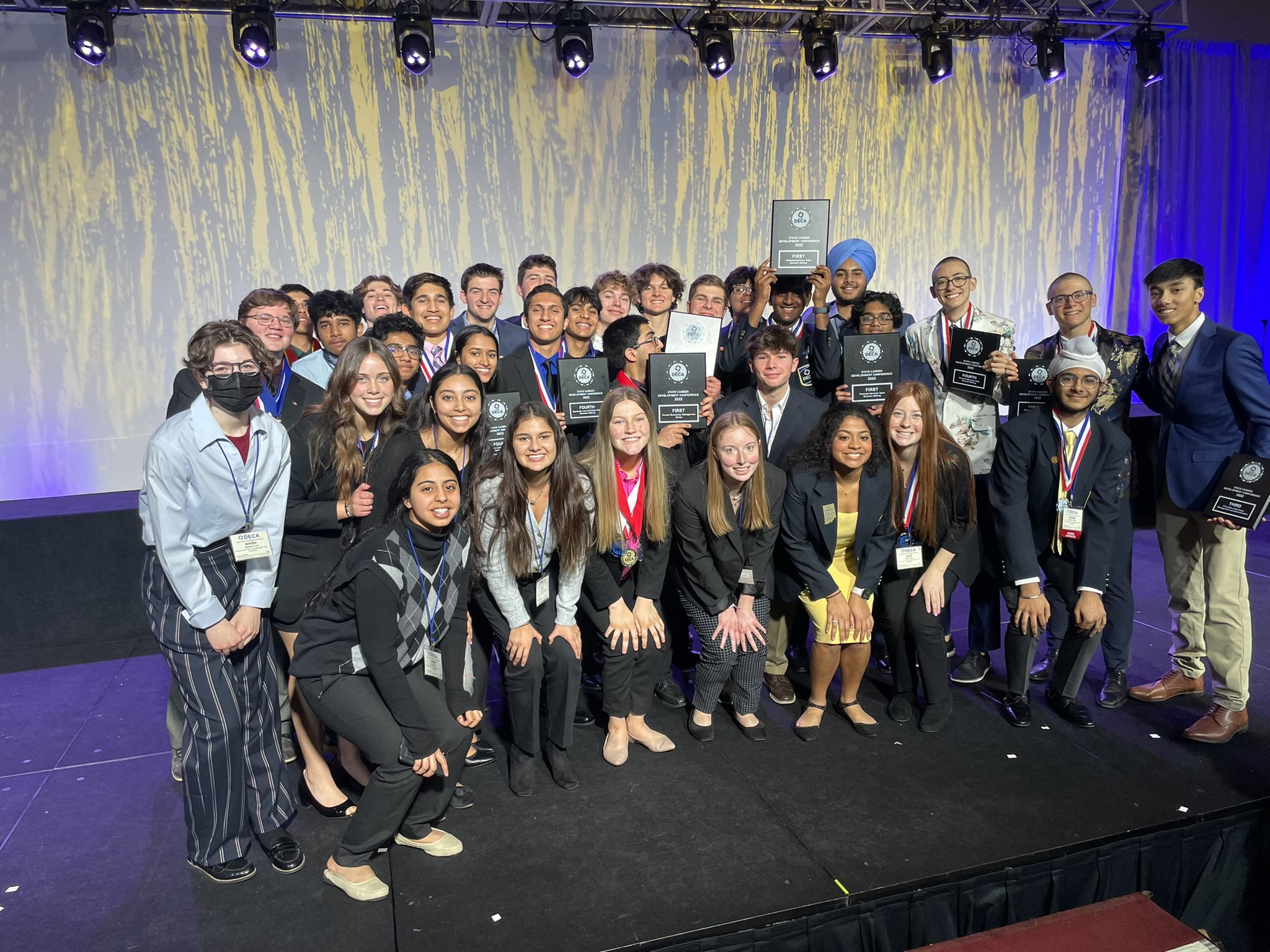
Winners of Indiana DECA SCDC 2022

DECA's High School Division allows members to participate in eleven different types of competitive events:

- Principles of Business Administration Events
- Team Decision Making Events
- Individual Series Events
- Personal Finance Literacy Events
- Business Operations Research Events
- Project Management Events
- Entrepreneurship Events
- Professional Selling and Consulting Events
- Online Events
- Virtual Business Challenge Events
- Corporate Challenges

Competitive events fall into six different career clusters:

- Business Management & Administration
- Entrepreneurship
- Marketing
- Finance
- Hospitality & Tourism
- Personal Financial Literacy

== Collegiate Division Competitive events ==
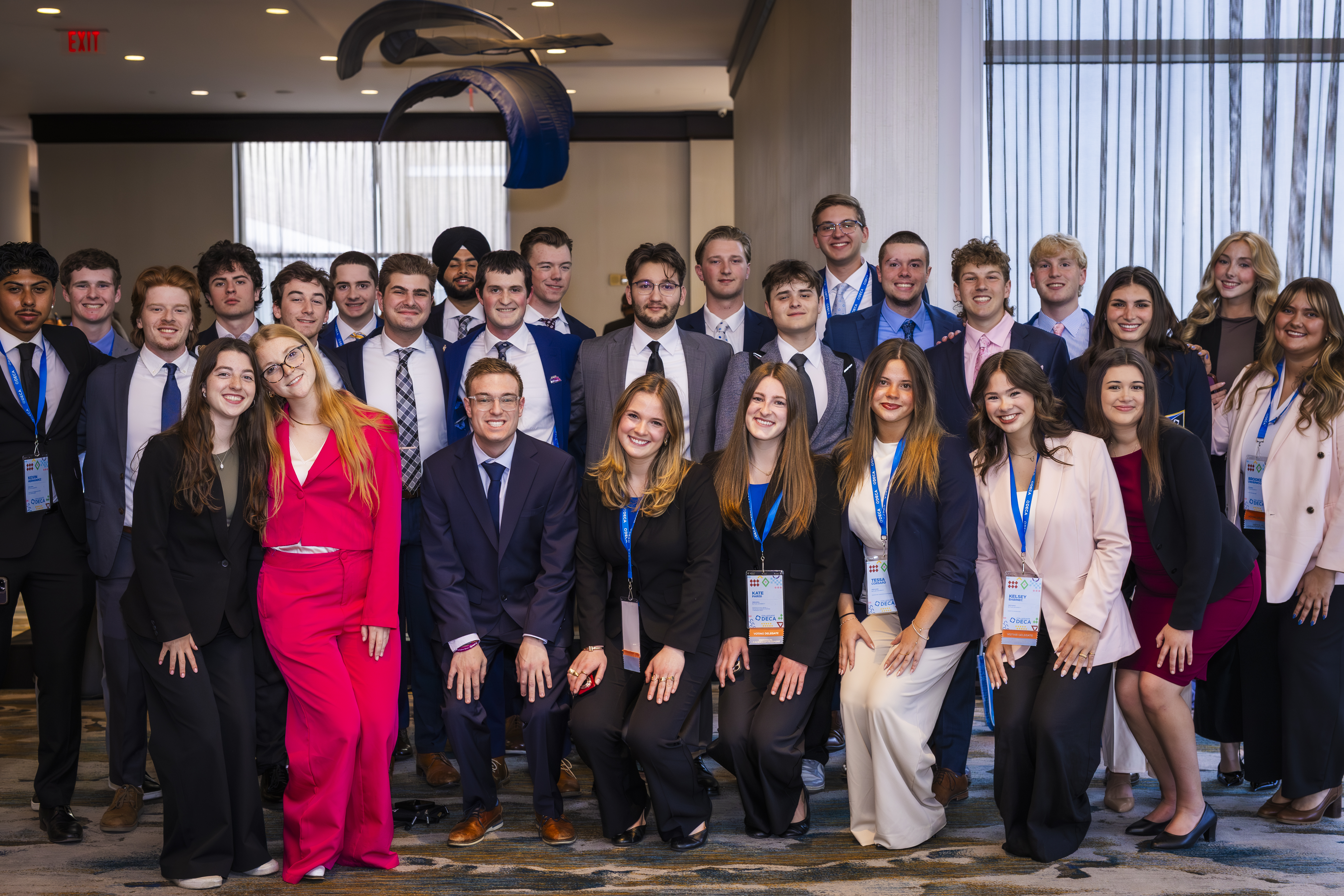
Butler University Collegiate DECA Members at CICDC 2026

DECA's Collegiate Division allows members to participate in four different types of competitive events:

- Individual Case Studies
- Team Case Studies
- Prepared Business Presentations
- Corporate Challenges

Competitive events fall into five different career clusters:

- Business Management & Administration
- Entrepreneurship
- Marketing
- Finance
- Hospitality & Tourism

== Executive officers ==
DECA's Executive Officer Teams consist of one president and four vice-presidents for both the high school and collegiate divisions. A new team of officers is elected every year at the International Career Development Conference by voting delegates from around the globe. The Executive Officer Teams serve as brand ambassadors for the organization during their term by attending conferences where they give speeches and present workshops.

2026–2027 High School Executive Officer Team:

President: Chrysanthi Euripides (VA)

Central Region Vice President: Abigail Huitt (IA)

North Atlantic Region Vice President: Anna Aldrich (NY)

Southern Region Vice President: N/A

Western Region Vice President: N/A

2026–2027 Collegiate Executive Officer Team:

President: Angela Ye (NV)

Vice President: Madelaine Bugg (KY)

Vice President: Myles Frueh (MN)

Vice President: Niya Denny (AZ)

Vice President: Xavier Sandoval (RI)
