= SkillsUSA =

Career and technical student organization

- SkillsUSA Logo (2004–present)
- Formation: 1965; 61 years ago
- Type: Career and Technical Student Organization (CTSO)
- Headquarters: Leesburg, Virginia, U.S.
- Members: 434,141 (2020)
- Executive director: Chelle Travis
- Website: skillsusa.org
- Formerly called: Vocational Industrial Clubs of America (VICA)

SkillsUSA is a United States career and technical student organization serving more than 442,000 high school, college and middle school students and professional members enrolled in training programs in trade, technical and skilled service occupations, including health occupations.

== History ==
=== 20th century ===
The original VICA seal

The original VICA logo

The SkillsUSA-VICA logo as of 1999

SkillsUSA was originally known as the Vocational Industrial Clubs of America (VICA).

The constitution establishing the Vocational Industrial Clubs of America was adopted at the Trade and Industrial Youth Conference held May 6–8, 1965 in Nashville, Tennessee. Representatives from 14 states, consisting of approximately 200 students, advisors, and business and labor representatives, gathered to choose the club's name, colors, motto, purposes and goals. The official red blazer, part of the organization's uniform, was patterned after the blazer from Illinois's organization. These representatives were from existing vocational education groups which agreed to finance the effort, from the states of Alabama, Arkansas, Georgia, Illinois, Indiana, Ohio, Oklahoma, North Carolina, Missouri, South Carolina, Tennessee, Texas, Virginia, and West Virginia. The National FFA Organization is credited with making the first financial contribution. The American Vocational Association offered office space at no cost in its Washington headquarters. Additionally, the AVA's Trade and Industrial Division provided a grant.

Tommy Snider from Griffin, Georgia was elected as VICA's first student president and Larry W. Johnson, the assistant supervisor of T&I education and state advisor for the Vocation Industrial Clubs of North Carolina, became the first executive secretary of VICA on July 1, 1965. He continued in the position until 1987.

By 1966, membership was up to 29,534, spanning 1,074 clubs across 26 states and territories. Additionally, the first issue of the club's magazine was produced. At the national conference, held in Little Rock, Arkansas, the VICA emblem was unveiled, and the first official state charters were presented.

In 1969, the Postsecondary Division of VICA was approved during a Constitutional Convention held in Memphis, Tennessee, bringing total membership to 82,000. The following year, the first edition of the VICA Leadership Handbook was published.

On VICA's 10-year anniversary (1975), the organization inducted its one millionth member. Three years later, VICA saw the start of the construction of its National Leadership Center in Leesburg, Virginia.

VICA hosted the International Youth Skill Olympics, which held a competition following the National Leadership and Skills Conference (NLSC) in 1981, in Atlanta.

In 1995, the national competition, then known as the United States Skill Olympics, was renamed to the SkillsUSA Championships during the NLSC. In, 1999, during the NLSC, VICA was renamed to SkillsUSA-VICA.

=== 21st century ===
In 2002, the organization's name was shortened to SkillsUSA.

== Membership ==
SkillsUSA has over 444,000 members, organized into at least 5,111 schools in all 50 states and 2 territorial associations, including Washington, D.C., Puerto Rico, the Virgin Islands, and alumni members.

Approximately 19,000 teachers and school administrators serve as professional SkillsUSA members and instructors.

More than 600 corporations, trade associations and labor unions actively support SkillsUSA on a national level through financial aid, in-kind contributions and involvement of their people in SkillsUSA activities. Many more work directly with state associations and local chapters.

SkillsUSA programs include local, regional, state and national competitions. During the annual national-level SkillsUSA Championships, more than 6,800 students compete in 114 hands-on skill and leadership contests.

SkillsUSA programs also help to establish industry standards for job skill training in the classroom and is cited as a "successful model of employer-driven youth development training program" by the U.S. Department of Labor.

== Curricular ==
The SkillsUSA Career Essentials suite, introduced in 2017, includes three parts. Career Essentials: Foundations, formerly called the Career Readiness Curriculum, includes 29 lesson plans based on Common Core State Standards. It infuses 21st-century skills into student engagement activities. Career Essentials: Experiences replaces the Professional Development Program. The new online curriculum has 15 project-based learning experiences; these provide real-world context for the essential elements of the SkillsUSA Framework of developing personal, workplace and technical skills grounded in academics. The third component of the suite, Career Essentials: Assessments, previously known as Skill Connect Assessments, offers reliable evaluation of over 40 technical and employability areas. The assessments were originally developed through a grant from the W.K. Kellogg Foundation.

Xplore is a SkillsUSA career exploration program designed for high school or college/postsecondary chapter members to facilitate engaging, hands-on lessons for middle school students.

== National Leadership and Skills Conference ==
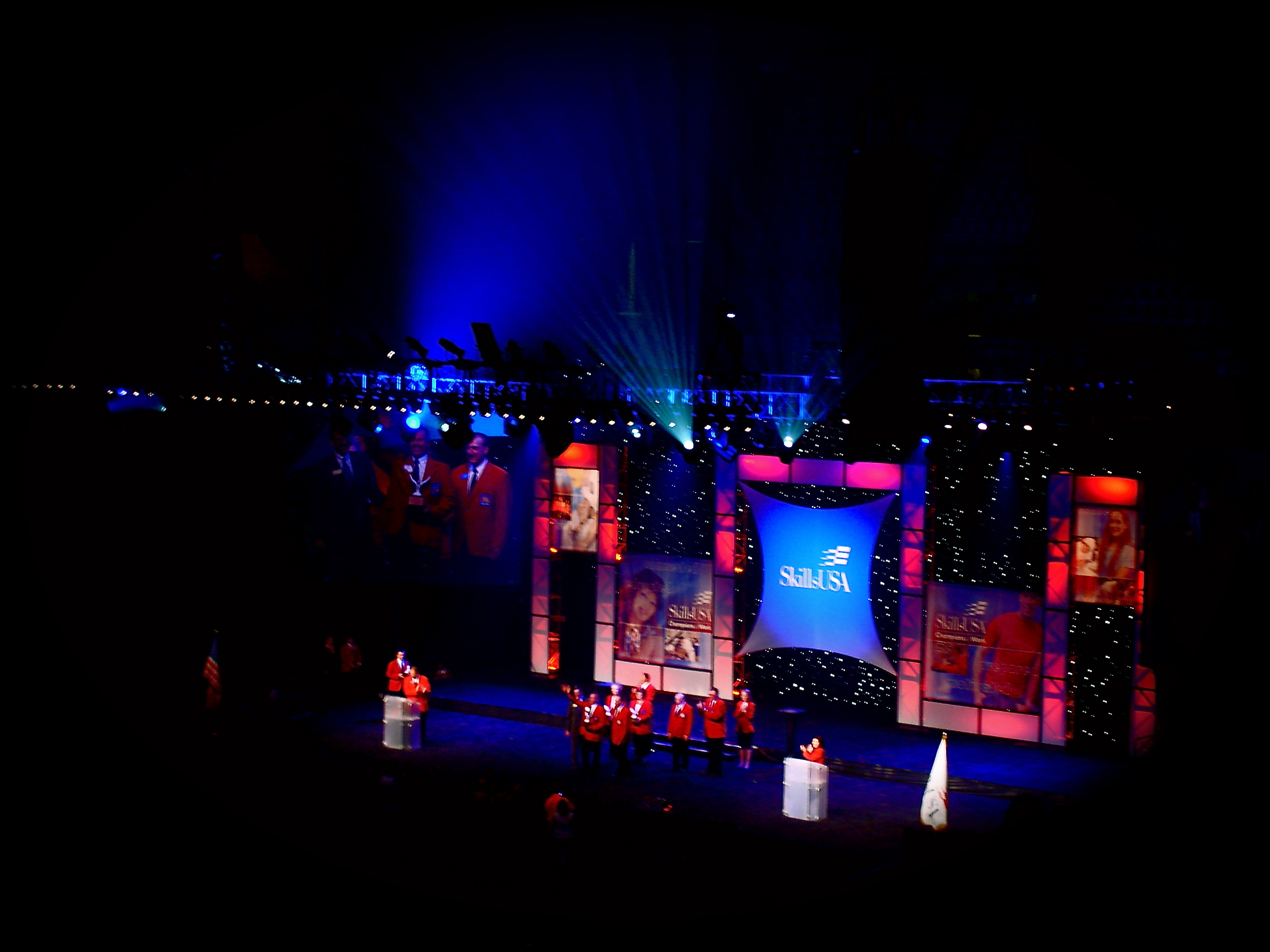
The opening ceremonies at SkillsUSA's 2008 conference

The National Leadership and Skills Conference is held annually. From 2015-2020, it was held in Louisville, KY. Starting in 2021, this conference moved to Atlanta, GA under a new six-year contract. This contract was extended to 2033 in June 2024. Most of the competitions are held at the Georgia World Congress Center. General sessions are held in State Farm Arena. The week-long conference entails the competitions, SkillsUSA TECHSPO (the nation's largest trade show in trade and industrial education), a career fair, and SkillsUSA student government sessions. The SkillsUSA Championships is expected to bring in $30 million annually to Atlanta's economy.

Students from the various state associations socialize and learn from one another during the week. Each state association has collectible pins that are often traded between students from various state associations. These pins are normally worn on the official SkillsUSA blazer.

There are recreational activities scheduled during the conference week, including a SkillsUSA night at Kentucky Kingdom.

The week culminates in the awards ceremony. The NLSC generally has a featured keynote speaker. There have been a number of noteworthy speakers, including Ronald Reagan, Chuck Yeager, Mike Rowe and James Lovell.

== Contests ==
SkillsUSA offers competitive activities in which students strive to achieve in a variety of occupational skill and leadership areas. Competition in skill and personal achievement is encouraged at all levels. Leadership contests include public speaking, parliamentary procedure, safety, opening and closing ceremonies, and job interviewing. Occupational skill contests include the building trades, health occupations, automotive technology, the electrical/electronics industry and personal services. Among many others, there are competitions for outstanding SkillsUSA chapter, community service, entrepreneurship and customer service.

Competitions begin locally and continue through the state and national levels. Some states also have district competitions. In most contests at the national championships, SkillsUSA presents medallions to the top three winners. In other contests, more than three medals may be presented if a standard is met. State and local contests may include the official national contests, but may also include contests not offered at the national level.

The contests are organized and run through a partnership of industry, labor and education. These partners provide awards as well. More than 5,500 students – winners from their states – compete in the $36-million national event.

SkillsUSA is the official U.S. representative to the WorldSkills Competition. Select winners from the SkillsUSA Championships train for one year before competing at the biennial internationals.

SkillsUSA competitions develop enthusiasm for learning and a sense of accomplishment. By recognizing students’ skills and abilities, the competitions promote professional development and appreciation of quality job skills. The events also stimulate public, and specifically student, interest in career and technical training.

Students may participate in three types of contests: Leadership, Occupationally Related, and Skilled and Technical Sciences. Demonstration contests are added to determine interest. If interest is sufficient, demonstration contests can become official competitions and are added to one of the three categories.
