= 1926 Akron Indians season =

National Football League team season

- Head coach: Al Nesser and Frank Nied
- Home stadium: League Park

Results
- Record: 1–4–3
- Division place: T-16th NFL
- Playoffs: No playoffs until 1932

The 1926 season was the seventh and final season of the Akron Indians in the National Football League and their only season as the Indians. The team failed to improve on their previous output of 4–2–2, winning only one game. They tied for 16th place in the league, out of 22 teams.

== Schedule ==
Week	Date	Opponent	Result	Record	Venue	Attendance	Recap	Sources
1	September 25	at Frankford Yellow Jackets	T 6–6	0–0–1	Frankford Stadium	7,000	Recap	
2	September 26	at Buffalo Rangers	L 0–7	0–1–1	Bison Stadium	2,500	Recap	
3	October 3	Hammond Pros	W 17–0	1–1–1	General Field		Recap	
4	October 10	Canton Bulldogs	T 0–0	1–1–2	General Field		Recap	
5	October 24	at Detroit Panthers	L 0–25	1–2–2	Navin Field		Recap	
6	October 31	at Chicago Bears	L 0–17	1–3–2	Cubs Park	6,500	Recap	
7	November 7	at Pottsville Maroons	L 0–34	1–4–2	Minersville Park		Recap	
8	November 25	at Canton Bulldogs	T 0–0	1–4–3	Lakeside Park		Recap	

== Standings ==
NFL standings
	W	L	T	PCT	PF	PA	STK
Frankford Yellow Jackets	14	1	2	.933	236	49	T1
Chicago Bears	12	1	3	.923	216	63	L1
Pottsville Maroons	10	2	2	.833	155	29	T1
Kansas City Cowboys	8	3	0	.727	76	53	W7
Green Bay Packers	7	3	3	.700	151	61	T1
New York Giants	8	4	1	.667	151	61	W3
Los Angeles Buccaneers	6	3	1	.667	67	57	L1
Duluth Eskimos	6	5	3	.545	113	81	L1
Buffalo Rangers	4	4	2	.500	53	62	T1
Chicago Cardinals	5	6	1	.455	74	98	L1
Providence Steam Roller	5	7	1	.417	89	103	L1
Detroit Panthers	4	6	2	.400	107	60	L3
Hartford Blues	3	7	0	.300	57	99	L1
Brooklyn Lions	3	8	0	.273	60	150	L3
Milwaukee Badgers	2	7	0	.222	41	66	L5
Dayton Triangles	1	4	1	.200	15	82	L2
Akron Indians	1	4	3	.200	23	89	T1
Racine Tornadoes	1	4	0	.200	8	92	L4
Columbus Tigers	1	6	0	.143	26	93	L5
Canton Bulldogs	1	9	3	.100	46	161	L1
Hammond Pros	0	4	0	.000	3	56	L4
Louisville Colonels	0	4	0	.000	0	108	L4

Note: Tie games were not officially counted in the standings until 1972.

== Roster ==
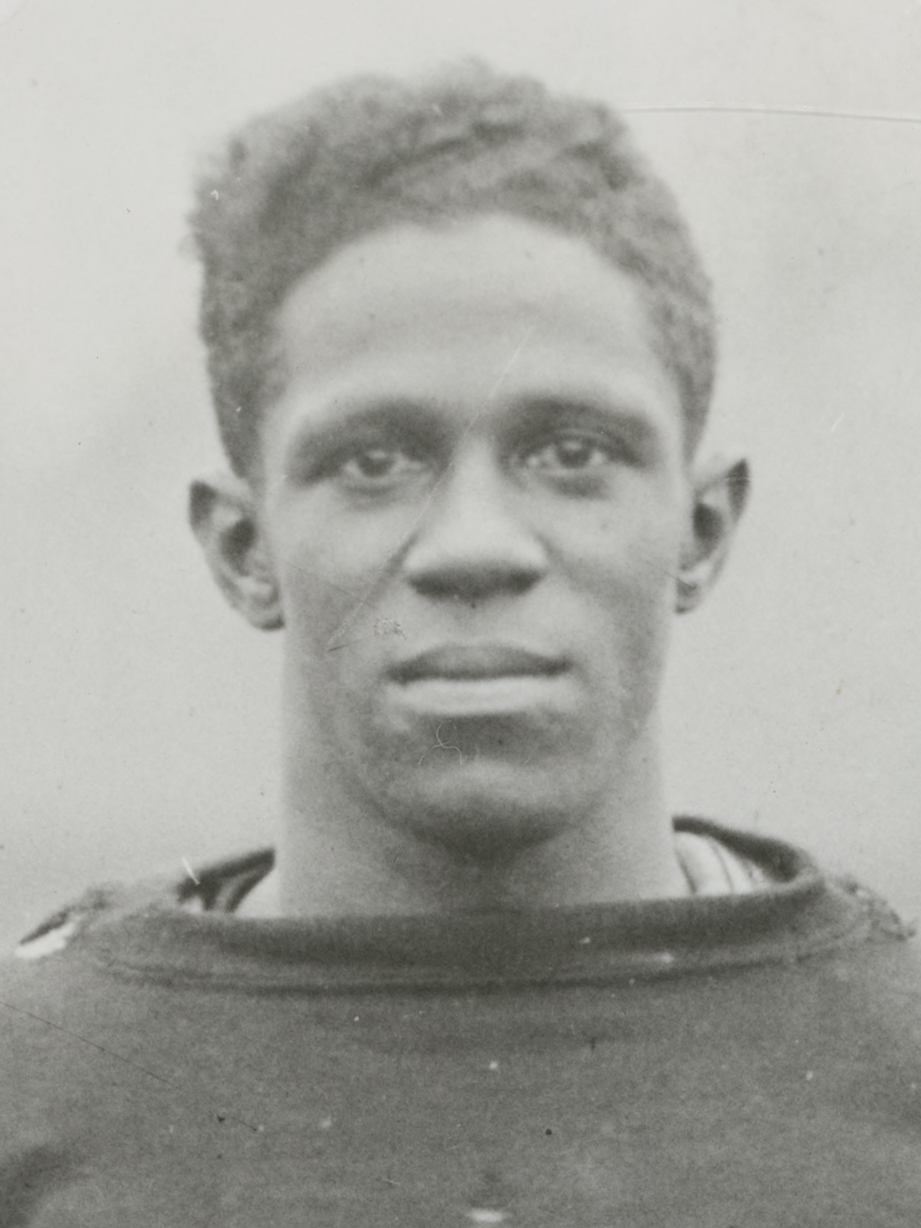
Akron Indians quarterback and team star Fritz Pollard.

Opening day players for the Indians included:

Starters		—	Reserves	
Name	College	Position	Name	College
Carl "Red" Daum	Akron	LE	Nat McCombs	Haskell
Knute Cauldwell	Wabash	LT		
Harry "Red" Seidelson	Pittsburgh	LG	George Rohleder	Wittenberg
George Berry	(none)	C		
Al Nesser	(none)	RG		
Alvro Casey (Running Wolf)	Haskell, Northeastern Oklahoma	RT		
Frank Bissell	Fordham	RE		
Fritz Pollard	Brown	QB		
Hal Griggs	Butler	LHB		
Obie Newman	Carnegie Mellon	RHB		
Earl Cramer	Hamline	FB		
