= List of NFL teams with fewest points scored =

== Single digit outputs ==
Team	PF	PA	Record
1929 Dayton Triangles	7	136	0-6
1928 Dayton Triangles	9	131	0-7
1928 Chicago Cardinals	7	107	1-5
1927 Buffalo Bisons	8	123	0-5
1926 Racine Tornadoes	8	92	1-4
1926 Hammond Pros	3	56	0-4
1926 Louisville Colonels	0	108	0-4
1925 Milwaukee Badgers	7	191	0-6
1925 Duluth Kelleys	6	25	0-3
1925 Dayton Triangles	3	84	0-7-1
1924 Rochester Jeffersons	7	156	0-7
1923 Rochester Jeffersons	6	141	0-4
1923 Louisville Brecks	0	90	0-3
1922 Evansville Crimson Giants	6	88	0-3
1922 Hammond Pros	0	69	0-5-1
1921 Louisville Brecks	0	27	0-2
1921 Muncie Flyers	0	28	0-2
1921 Tonawanda Kardex	0	45	0-1
1921 New York Brickley Giants	0	72	0-2
1920 Muncie Flyers	0	45	0-1
