= 1926 Chicago Cardinals season =

American football team season

- Head coach: Norm Barry
- Home stadium: Normal Park

Results
- Record: 5–6–1
- League place: 10th NFL

The 1926 Chicago Cardinals season was their seventh in the National Football League. The team failed to improve on their previous output of 11–2–1, winning only five games. They finished tenth in the league.

== Schedule ==
| Game | Date | Opponent | Result | Record |
|---|---|---|---|---|
| 1 | September 19 | Columbus Tigers | W 14–0 | 1–0 |
| 2 | September 26 | Los Angeles Buccaneers | W 15–0 | 2–0 |
| 3 | October 3 | Racine Tornadoes | W 20–0 | 3–0 |
| 4 | October 10 | at Green Bay Packers | W 13–7 | 4–0 |
| 5 | October 17 | Chicago Bears | L 0–16 | 4–1 |
| 6 | October 24 | at Milwaukee Badgers | W 3–2 | 5–1 |
| 7 | October 31 | Green Bay Packers | L 0–3 | 5–2 |
| 8 | November 6 | at Frankford Yellow Jackets | L 7–33 | 5–3 |
| 9 | November 7 | at New York Giants | L 0–20 | 5–4 |
| 10 | November 11 | at Chicago Bears | L 0–10 | 5–5 |
| 11 | November 25 | at Chicago Bears | T 0–0 | 5–5–1 |
| 12 | November 28 | Kansas City Cowboys | L 2–7 | 5–6–1 |

== Standings ==
NFL standings
| | W | L | T | PCT | PF | PA | STK |
|---|---|---|---|---|---|---|---|
| Frankford Yellow Jackets | 14 | 1 | 2 | .933 | 236 | 49 | T1 |
| Chicago Bears | 12 | 1 | 3 | .923 | 216 | 63 | L1 |
| Pottsville Maroons | 10 | 2 | 2 | .833 | 155 | 29 | T1 |
| Kansas City Cowboys | 8 | 3 | 0 | .727 | 76 | 53 | W7 |
| Green Bay Packers | 7 | 3 | 3 | .700 | 151 | 61 | T1 |
| New York Giants | 8 | 4 | 1 | .667 | 151 | 61 | W3 |
| Los Angeles Buccaneers | 6 | 3 | 1 | .667 | 67 | 57 | L1 |
| Duluth Eskimos | 6 | 5 | 3 | .545 | 113 | 81 | L1 |
| Buffalo Rangers | 4 | 4 | 2 | .500 | 53 | 62 | T1 |
| Chicago Cardinals | 5 | 6 | 1 | .455 | 74 | 98 | L1 |
| Providence Steam Roller | 5 | 7 | 1 | .417 | 89 | 103 | L1 |
| Detroit Panthers | 4 | 6 | 2 | .400 | 107 | 60 | L3 |
| Hartford Blues | 3 | 7 | 0 | .300 | 57 | 99 | L1 |
| Brooklyn Lions | 3 | 8 | 0 | .273 | 60 | 150 | L3 |
| Milwaukee Badgers | 2 | 7 | 0 | .222 | 41 | 66 | L5 |
| Dayton Triangles | 1 | 4 | 1 | .200 | 15 | 82 | L2 |
| Akron Indians | 1 | 4 | 3 | .200 | 23 | 89 | T1 |
| Racine Tornadoes | 1 | 4 | 0 | .200 | 8 | 92 | L4 |
| Columbus Tigers | 1 | 6 | 0 | .143 | 26 | 93 | L5 |
| Canton Bulldogs | 1 | 9 | 3 | .100 | 46 | 161 | L1 |
| Hammond Pros | 0 | 4 | 0 | .000 | 3 | 56 | L4 |
| Louisville Colonels | 0 | 4 | 0 | .000 | 0 | 108 | L4 |

Note: Tie games were not officially counted in the standings until 1972.
