= 1926 Los Angeles Buccaneers season =

National Football League team season

- Head coach: Tut Imlay and Brick Muller

Results
- Record: 6–3–1
- League place: T–6th NFL

The 1926 Los Angeles Buccaneers season was the franchise's only season in the NFL. The team finished 6–3–1, tying for sixth place in the league.

== Schedule ==
Week	Date	Opponent	Result	Record	Venue	Game recap
1	Bye					
2	September 26	at Chicago Cardinals	L 0–15	0–1	Normal Park	Recap
3	October 3	at Milwaukee Badgers	W 6–0	1–1	Athletic Park	Recap
4	Bye					
5	October 17	at Canton Bulldogs	W 16–13	2–1	Lakeside Park	Recap
6	October 24	at Buffalo Rangers	T 0–0	2–1–1	Bison Stadium	Recap
7	Bye					
8	November 7	at Providence Steam Roller	W 7–6	3–1–1	Cycledrome	Recap
9	November 11	at Pottsville Maroons	L 0–10	3–2–1	Minersville Park	Recap
9	November 14	at New York Giants	W 6–0	4–2–1	Polo Grounds	Recap
10	November 21	at Brooklyn Lions	W 20–0	5–2–1	Ebbets Field	Recap
11	November 25	at Detroit Panthers	W 9–6	6–2–1	Navin Field	Recap
12	December 5	at Kansas City Cowboys	L 3–7	6–3–1	Muehlebach Field	Recap

== Standings ==
NFL standings
	W	L	T	PCT	PF	PA	STK
Frankford Yellow Jackets	14	1	2	.933	236	49	T1
Chicago Bears	12	1	3	.923	216	63	L1
Pottsville Maroons	10	2	2	.833	155	29	T1
Kansas City Cowboys	8	3	0	.727	76	53	W7
Green Bay Packers	7	3	3	.700	151	61	T1
New York Giants	8	4	1	.667	151	61	W3
Los Angeles Buccaneers	6	3	1	.667	67	57	L1
Duluth Eskimos	6	5	3	.545	113	81	L1
Buffalo Rangers	4	4	2	.500	53	62	T1
Chicago Cardinals	5	6	1	.455	74	98	L1
Providence Steam Roller	5	7	1	.417	89	103	L1
Detroit Panthers	4	6	2	.400	107	60	L3
Hartford Blues	3	7	0	.300	57	99	L1
Brooklyn Lions	3	8	0	.273	60	150	L3
Milwaukee Badgers	2	7	0	.222	41	66	L5
Dayton Triangles	1	4	1	.200	15	82	L2
Akron Indians	1	4	3	.200	23	89	T1
Racine Tornadoes	1	4	0	.200	8	92	L4
Columbus Tigers	1	6	0	.143	26	93	L5
Canton Bulldogs	1	9	3	.100	46	161	L1
Hammond Pros	0	4	0	.000	3	56	L4
Louisville Colonels	0	4	0	.000	0	108	L4

Note: Tie games were not officially counted in the standings until 1972.
