= Dick Vick =

American football player (1892–1980)

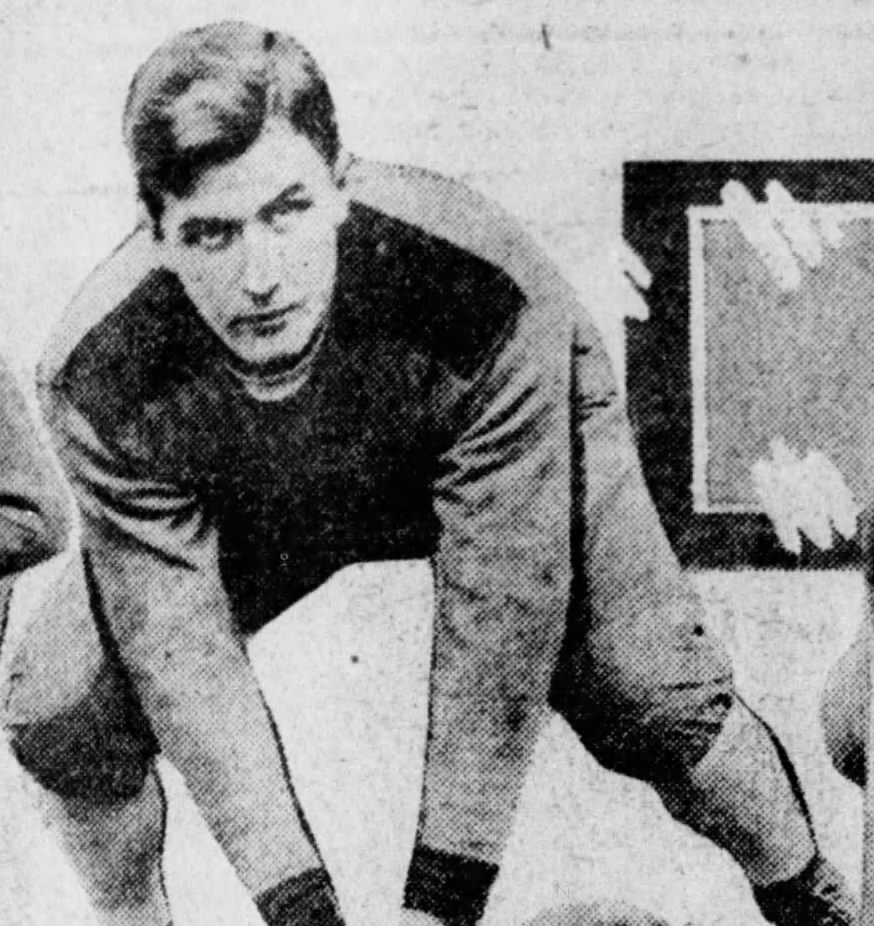

Profile
- Positions: Tailback, Quarterback

Personal information
- Born: April 16, 1892; Edwards Township, Minnesota, U.S.
- Died: September 1980 (aged 88)
- Listed height: 5 ft 9 in (1.75 m)
- Listed weight: 167 lb (76 kg)

Career information
- College: Washington & Jefferson

Career history
- Kenosha Maroons (1924); Detroit Panthers (1925–1926); Canton Bulldogs (1926)
- Stats at Pro Football Reference

Richard Vick (April 16, 1892 – September 1980) was an American professional football player for three seasons in the National Football League (NFL) with the Kenosha Maroons, Detroit Panthers and the Canton Bulldogs.

Vick played college football on the 1921 Washington & Jefferson Presidents team that played California to a 0–0 tie in the 1922 Rose Bowl. He transferred to the Michigan Wolverines and played on their undefeated 1923 team. His brother, Ernie, was an All-American football player at Michigan and played major league baseball and in the NFL. They both attended Scott High School in Toledo, Ohio.
