= Champ Boettcher =

American football player (1900–1965)

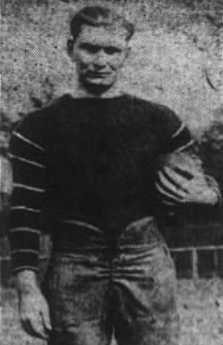

Profile
- Position: Fullback

Personal information
- Born: September 18, 1900; Reeseville, Wisconsin
- Died: December 20, 1965 (aged 65); Watertown, Wisconsin
- Listed height: 5 ft 10 in (1.78 m)
- Listed weight: 193 lb (88 kg)

Career information
- High school: Watertown (WI)
- College: Lawrence

Career history
- Racine Tornadoes (1926)

Career statistics
- Games played: 4
- Stats at Pro Football Reference

Raymond Edward Boettcher was a fullback in the National Football League. He played with the Racine Tornadoes during the 1926 NFL season.
