= 1926 Brooklyn Lions season =

American football season

- Head coach: Punk Berryman
- Home stadium: Ebbets Field

Results
- Record: 3–8
- League place: 14th NFL

The 1926 Brooklyn Lions season was their first and only season in the National Football League (NFL). The team finished 3–8, placing 14th of the 22 teams in the league.

== Schedule ==
Game	Date	Opponent	Result	Record	Venue	Attendance	Recap	Sources
1	September 26	at Providence Steam Roller	L 0–13	0–1	Cycledrome		Recap	
2	October 10	Hartford Blues	W 6–0	1–1	Ebbets Field		Recap	
3	October 16	Pottsville Maroons	L 0–21	1–2	Ebbets Field		Recap	
4	October 17	at Pottsville Maroons	L 0–14	1–3	Minersville Park		Recap	
5	October 23	Columbus Tigers	W 20–12	2–3	Ebbets Field		Recap	
6	October 24	at Hartford Blues	L 6–16	2–4	East Hartford Velodrome		Recap	
7	November 7	Kansas City Cowboys	L 9–10	2–5	Ebbets Field		Recap	
8	November 14	Canton Bulldogs	W 19–0	3–5	Ebbets Field		Recap	
9	November 21	Los Angeles Buccaneers	L 0–20	3–6	Ebbets Field		Recap	
10	November 25	New York Giants	L 0–17	3–7	Ebbets Field		Recap	
11	November 28	at New York Giants	L 0–27	3–8	Polo Grounds		Recap	

== Standings ==
NFL standings
	W	L	T	PCT	PF	PA	STK
Frankford Yellow Jackets	14	1	2	.933	236	49	T1
Chicago Bears	12	1	3	.923	216	63	L1
Pottsville Maroons	10	2	2	.833	155	29	T1
Kansas City Cowboys	8	3	0	.727	76	53	W7
Green Bay Packers	7	3	3	.700	151	61	T1
New York Giants	8	4	1	.667	151	61	W3
Los Angeles Buccaneers	6	3	1	.667	67	57	L1
Duluth Eskimos	6	5	3	.545	113	81	L1
Buffalo Rangers	4	4	2	.500	53	62	T1
Chicago Cardinals	5	6	1	.455	74	98	L1
Providence Steam Roller	5	7	1	.417	89	103	L1
Detroit Panthers	4	6	2	.400	107	60	L3
Hartford Blues	3	7	0	.300	57	99	L1
Brooklyn Lions	3	8	0	.273	60	150	L3
Milwaukee Badgers	2	7	0	.222	41	66	L5
Dayton Triangles	1	4	1	.200	15	82	L2
Akron Indians	1	4	3	.200	23	89	T1
Racine Tornadoes	1	4	0	.200	8	92	L4
Columbus Tigers	1	6	0	.143	26	93	L5
Canton Bulldogs	1	9	3	.100	46	161	L1
Hammond Pros	0	4	0	.000	3	56	L4
Louisville Colonels	0	4	0	.000	0	108	L4

Note: Tie games were not officially counted in the standings until 1972.
