= 1926 Duluth Eskimos season =

National Football League team season

- Head coach: Dewey Scanlon

Results
- Record: 6–5–3
- League place: 8th NFL

The 1926 Duluth Eskimos season was their fourth in the league and first season as the Eskimos. The squad was a "traveling team," playing all of their 14 games on the road. The team improved on their previous output of 0–3 by winning six games, good for an 8th place finish in the NFL.

== Schedule ==
Game	Date	Opponent	Result	Record	Venue	Attendance	Sources
1	September 19	vs. Kansas City Cowboys	W 7–0	1–0	Athletic Park (Milwaukee, WI)	6,000	
2	October 3	at Green Bay Packers	T 0–0	1–0–1	City Stadium	2,500	
3	October 10	at Hammond Pros	W 26–0	2–0–1	Turner Field		
4	October 17	at Racine Tornadoes	W 21–0	3–0–1	Horlick Legion Field	2,600	
5	October 24	at Chicago Bears	L 6–24	3–1–1	Cubs Park	12,000	
6	October 31	at Milwaukee Badgers	W 7–6	4–1–1	Athletic Park		
7	November 7	at Detroit Panthers	T 0–0	4–1–2	Navin Field	21,000	
8	November 11	at New York Giants	L 13–14	4–2–2	Polo Grounds	5,000	
9	November 13	at Frankford Yellow Jackets	L 0–10	4–3–2	Frankford Stadium	6,000	
10	November 14	at Pottsville Maroons	L 0–13	4–4–2	Minersville Park		
11	November 21	at Canton Bulldogs	W 10–2	5–4–2	Lakeside Park		
12	November 27	at Hartford Blues	W 16–0	6–4–2	East Harford Velodrome		
13	November 28	at Providence Steam Roller	T 0–0	6–4–3	Cycledrome		
14	December 12	at Kansas City Cowboys	L 7–12	6–5–3	Muehlebach Field		

== Standings ==
NFL standings
	W	L	T	PCT	PF	PA	STK
Frankford Yellow Jackets	14	1	2	.933	236	49	T1
Chicago Bears	12	1	3	.923	216	63	L1
Pottsville Maroons	10	2	2	.833	155	29	T1
Kansas City Cowboys	8	3	0	.727	76	53	W7
Green Bay Packers	7	3	3	.700	151	61	T1
New York Giants	8	4	1	.667	147	51	W3
Los Angeles Buccaneers	6	3	1	.667	67	57	L1
Duluth Eskimos	6	5	3	.545	113	81	L1
Buffalo Rangers	4	4	2	.500	53	62	T1
Chicago Cardinals	5	6	1	.455	74	98	L1
Providence Steam Roller	5	7	1	.417	89	103	L1
Detroit Panthers	4	6	2	.400	107	60	L3
Hartford Blues	3	7	0	.300	57	99	L1
Brooklyn Lions	3	8	0	.273	60	150	L3
Milwaukee Badgers	2	7	0	.222	41	66	L5
Dayton Triangles	1	4	1	.200	15	82	L2
Akron Indians	1	4	3	.200	23	89	T1
Racine Tornadoes	1	4	0	.200	8	92	L4
Columbus Tigers	1	6	0	.143	26	93	L5
Canton Bulldogs	1	9	3	.100	46	161	L1
Hammond Pros	0	4	0	.000	3	56	L4
Louisville Colonels	0	4	0	.000	0	108	L4

Note: Tie games were not officially counted in the standings until 1972.
