= Roman Brumm =

American football player (1898–1981)

Profile
- Position: End / Tackle / Center / Guard

Personal information
- Born: March 5, 1898; Madison, Wisconsin
- Died: September 2, 1981 (aged 83); Los Angeles, California
- Listed height: 6 ft 0 in (1.83 m)
- Listed weight: 182 lb (83 kg)

Career information
- College: Wisconsin–Eau Claire, Wisconsin–La Crosse, Wisconsin

Career history
- Racine Legion/Tornadoes (1924, 1926); Milwaukee Badgers (1925)

Career NFL statistics
- Games played: 18
- Stats at Pro Football Reference

Roman Brumm (March 5, 1898 – September 2, 1981) was a player in the National Football League. He first played with the Racine Legion during the 1924 NFL season. The following season, he played with the Milwaukee Badgers before returning to Racine, by then renamed the Tornadoes, for the 1926 NFL season.
