= George Glennie =

American football player (1902–1998)

Profile
- Position: Guard

Personal information
- Born: November 11, 1902; Mindoro, Wisconsin
- Died: December 11, 1998 (aged 96)

Career information
- College: Ripon

Career history
- 1926: Racine Tornadoes

George Glennie (November 11, 1902 – December 11, 1998) was a guard in the National Football League. He played with the Racine Tornadoes during the 1926 NFL season.
