= 1926 Pottsville Maroons season =

National Football League team season

- Head coach: Dick Rauch
- Home stadium: Minersville Park

Results
- Record: 15–2–2 Overall; 10–2–2 NFL
- League place: 3rd NFL

The 1926 Pottsville Maroons season was their second in the National Football League. The team matched their previous league record of 10–2, They finished third in the league standings.

The Maroons established an NFL record for most shutout wins or ties in a season, with 11 in "official" league games.

== Schedule ==
Game	Date	Opponent	Result	Record	Venue	Attendance	Recap	Sources
–	September 19	League Island Marines	W 64–0		Minersville Park			
–	September 26	Media A.A.	W 52–0		Minersville Park			
1	October 3	Columbus Tigers	W 3–0	1–0	Minersville Park		Recap	
2	October 10	Dayton Triangles	W 24–6	2–0	Minersville Park		Recap	
3	October 16	at Brooklyn Lions	W 21–0	3–0	Ebbets Field	8,000	Recap	
4	October 17	Brooklyn Lions	W 14–0	4–0	Minersville Park	8,000	Recap	
5	October 24	at Providence Steam Roller	L 0–14	4–1	Cycledrome	1,500	Recap	
—	October 29	New York Giants	W 3–0		Wilkes-Barre, PA			
6	October 31	Buffalo Rangers	W 14–0	5–1	Minersville Park		Recap	
–	November 2	Shamokin Blue Comets	W 48–0		Minersville Park			
7	November 7	Akron Indians	W 34–0	6–1	Minersville Park		Recap	
8	November 11	Los Angeles Buccaneers	W 10–0	7–1	Minersville Park	3,000	Recap	
9	November 14	Duluth Eskimos	W 13–0	8–1	Minersville Park		Recap	
10	November 21	Hammond Pros	W 7–0	9–1	Minersville Park		Recap	
11	November 25	Providence Steam Roller	W 8–0	10–1	Minersville Park		Recap	
12	November 28	Buffalo Rangers	T 0–0	10–1–1	Minersville Park		Recap	
–	December 4	at Bethlehem Bears	W 27–0		Fabricators Field	"close to 10,000 expected"		
–	December 5	Gilberton Catamounts	W 6–0		Minersville Park	1,500		
13	December 12	at Chicago Bears	L 7–9	10–2–1	Cubs Park	5,500	Recap	
14	December 18	at Frankford Yellow Jackets	T 0–0	10–2–2	Frankford Stadium	2,000	Recap	
Notes: Thanksgiving Day: November 25. December 5: 40 minute game

== Standings ==
NFL standings
	W	L	T	PCT	PF	PA	STK
Frankford Yellow Jackets	14	1	2	.933	236	49	T1
Chicago Bears	12	1	3	.923	216	63	L1
Pottsville Maroons	10	2	2	.833	155	29	T1
Kansas City Cowboys	8	3	0	.727	76	53	W7
Green Bay Packers	7	3	3	.700	151	61	T1
New York Giants	8	4	1	.667	151	61	W3
Los Angeles Buccaneers	6	3	1	.667	67	57	L1
Duluth Eskimos	6	5	3	.545	113	81	L1
Buffalo Rangers	4	4	2	.500	53	62	T1
Chicago Cardinals	5	6	1	.455	74	98	L1
Providence Steam Roller	5	7	1	.417	89	103	L1
Detroit Panthers	4	6	2	.400	107	60	L3
Hartford Blues	3	7	0	.300	57	99	L1
Brooklyn Lions	3	8	0	.273	60	150	L3
Milwaukee Badgers	2	7	0	.222	41	66	L5
Dayton Triangles	1	4	1	.200	15	82	L2
Akron Indians	1	4	3	.200	23	89	T1
Racine Tornadoes	1	4	0	.200	8	92	L4
Columbus Tigers	1	6	0	.143	26	93	L5
Canton Bulldogs	1	9	3	.100	46	161	L1
Hammond Pros	0	4	0	.000	3	56	L4
Louisville Colonels	0	4	0	.000	0	108	L4

Note: Tie games were not officially counted in the standings until 1972.
