= George Burnside =

George Burnside may refer to:

- George Burnside (Concerned Brethren) (1908–1994), New Zealand evangelist
- George Burnside (American football) (1899–1962), blocking back in the National Football League
