= Frank Linnan =

American football player (1895–1981)

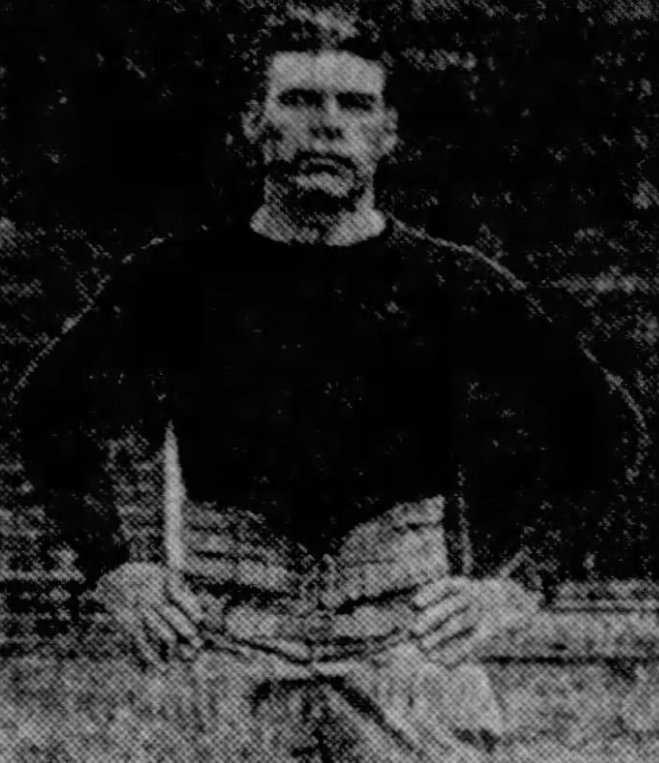

Profile
- Position: Offensive lineman

Personal information
- Born: February 20, 1895; Pocahontas, Iowa
- Died: June 2, 1981 (aged 86); Tequesta, Florida
- Listed height: 6 ft 2 in (1.88 m)
- Listed weight: 202 lb (92 kg)

Career information
- College: Marquette

Career history
- Racine Legion/Tornadoes (1922, 1926)

Career NFL statistics
- Games played: 5
- Stats at Pro Football Reference

Michael Francis Linnan (February 20, 1895 – June 2, 1981) was a player in the National Football League. He first played with the Racine Legion during the 1922 NFL season. After three years away from the NFL, he re-joined the team, by then renamed the Tornadoes, for the 1926 NFL season.
