= Graham Kernwein =

American football player (1904–1983)

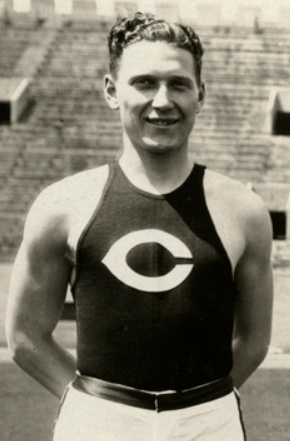
- Kernwein with the Chicago track team

No. 20
- Position: Halfback

Personal information
- Born: October 23, 1904; Claremont, Illinois, U.S.
- Died: January 25, 1983 (aged 78); Rochester, Minnesota, U.S.
- Listed height: 5 ft 11 in (1.80 m)
- Listed weight: 175 lb (79 kg)

Career information
- High school: Wenona (Wenona, Illinois)
- College: Chicago (1923–1925)

Career history
- Racine Tornadoes (1926); Chicago Bears (1927)*
- * Offseason or practice squad member only

Career statistics
- Games played: 4
- Games started: 4
- Stats at Pro Football Reference

Graham Armin Kernwein (October 23, 1904 – January 25, 1983) was an American professional football player who was a halfback for one season in the National Football League (NFL) for the Racine Tornadoes. He played college football for the Chicago Maroons for three years, being a top player under head coach Amos Alonzo Stagg. In addition to being a member of the Tornadoes in the NFL, he also had a stint with the Chicago Bears. Following his football career, he became an orthopedic surgeon.

== Early life and college ==
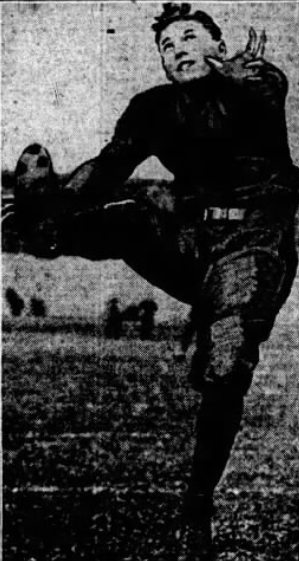
Kernwein making a punt

Graham Armin Kernwein was born on October 23, 1904, in Claremont, Illinois, to Armin and Cora Kernwein. In 1922, he graduated from Wenona High School in Wenona, Illinois. He was recruited to the University of Chicago, showing "great promise" in his first season on the football team (1923). Playing halfback, Kernwein was reported by the Chicago Tribune as "displaying considerable brilliance at finding the holes [in the line]." He was "used considerably" by head coach Amos Alonzo Stagg, with The Pantagraph writing that Kernwein "is regarded as the best bet to succeed John Thomas and Willis Zorn" in 1924.

Kernwein "continue[d] to improve" as a junior in 1924, earning his first varsity letter.

In 1925, The Daily Times reported that "Kernwein has been playing left half-back for the Maroons since the season opened and his stellar open-field running in the Big Ten games that Chicago has played so far this season has enabled Coach Stagg's proteges to defeat Purdue, Northwestern and tie Ohio State." A profile in the Chicago Tribune said "He's a triple threat athlete, with a few more threats tacked on for good measure. He can carry the ball, pass and kick. He can play brilliantly on defense, run fine defense, and he can think ... His speed is one of his greatest assets on the gridiron."

While at Chicago, Kernwein also competed in track, with his specialty being the 220 yard dash, where his best time was 22 seconds.

The Wenona Index described him as a "star halfback" and noted that although "Wenona has never won any fame as a football center," Kernwein, as well as William Metzger of the Bradley Braves, "cut a wide swath in state football circles" and they were followed by the town "as closely in their weekly exploits as if they were world champions." A report in the Tribune by Morrow Krum, following Kernwein's second-to-last collegiate football game, said the following

Then there was Graham Kernwein, wearing the Maroon and fighting the greatest battle of his life. Be it known that Kernwein is a senior, yesterday he played in the next to last game of his career. Be it also known that he was publicly reproved by Stagg for singing before a football game. Also be it known that Kernwein made the fumbles at Champaign that gave Illinois a victory. Not an optimistic record. But Kernwein stepped out onto the gridiron and played football until he could not walk. They carried him off the field, limp and choking, grief stricken because he could not go on.

In the interim between the time the game started and Kernwein was carried out, the 170 lb, back was an Atlas that held the Maroon team shoulder high. Kernwein did all the kicking. He smashed into the Green time after time. He threw and caught forward passes.

And in the third quarter Kernwein lay on the ground after a play. His leg was raised in the air. It had been twisted. He couldn't lower it. Jimmy Johnson, Chicago trainer, rushed to make an observation. Kernwein waved him away and in another moment was on his feet. He staggered through the next play and the next smashing Dartmouth interference. Then after the leg had been all but broken, Kernwein took the ball and started one of the greatest rallies in Maroon history by smashing around Dartmouth's left end and swinging back through the center of the Green backfield for a touchdown. Later, in the last period, the players unscrambled themselves. All but Kernwein rose. He was down, down for the last time in yesterday's game. He was played out, exhausted. But Kernwein had redeemed himself. Last night he was the Midway hero and he will be for a long time. He could not win, but he gave everything he had.

After graduating in 1926, Kernwein was awarded the Big Ten Conference Medal, given to a senior in each school who "has shown superiority in athletics and in scholarship." A report in The Capital Times wrote "Kernwein was an important cog in the Maroon grid machine of 1925 and 1926[sic], his fast running and clever dodging, combined with his kicking and tackling, making him an exceptionally valuable man to Chicago." According to coach Stagg, Kernwein also maintained a high grade average in school.

Coach Stagg, a College Football Hall of Famer, later rated Kernwein as one of "the best halfbacks turned out at the Midway" in Stagg's coaching career.

According to The Daily Times, Kernwein was "popular in university activities," and was chosen as a delegate of his fraternity for a national convention held in Denver.

Kernwein took a course in medical surgery at the University of Chicago and later graduated from the University of Chicago Medical School.

== Professional career ==
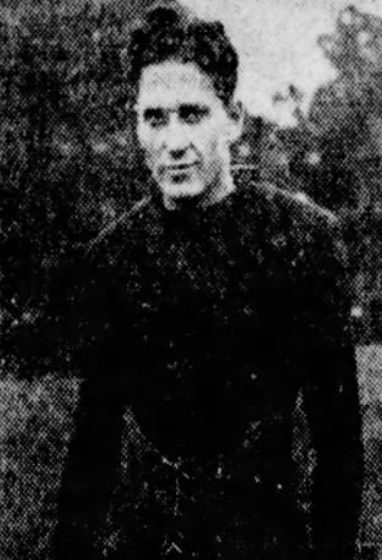
Kernwein with Racine

In September 1926, Kernwein was signed by the Racine Tornadoes of the National Football League (NFL). He made his NFL debut against the Hammond Pros in week one, winning 6–3, with his "brilliant open field running practically w[inning] the game for the Tornadoes." The Journal Times reported his "terrific driving ... pleased mightily" the spectators.

Despite being announced by George Ruetz as "undoubtedly not in condition" to start the next game against the Chicago Cardinals due to an illness, Kernwein played through the full game, a 0–20 loss. Against the Milwaukee Badgers in week three, Kernwein started and played through the entire game, a 2–13 loss. He missed the fourth game of the season, a loss to the Duluth Eskimos, with the flu.

A profile in the Green Bay Press-Gazette said of Kernwein: "A fast, slippery man who has proven the most consistent ground gainer on the Tornado squad. Does most of the Racine punting and is on the throwing end of many passes. Especially good, because of his speed at going around the ends." He started at right halfback in a 0–35 loss to the Green Bay Packers, the last game of the season for Racine, as they folded shortly afterwards.

In 1927, Kernwein was signed by the Chicago Bears, and scored a touchdown in an exhibition win against Ken Osbourne's Suburbans. He did not appear in any regular season games with the Bears.

== Later life and death ==
Kernwein announced his engagement to Dorothy Rice in July 1926. He married Elva Staud in February 1936. He served in the Army Medical Corps during World War II, and achieved the rank of lieutenant colonel. He became in charge of the Camp Ellis army hospital in 1944.

After his football career, Kernwein was an orthopedic surgeon at Rockford for 32 years, being rated one of the top bone specialists in the country. He was a member of the American Medical Association and was a diplomat of the American Board of Surgery, as well as the American Board of Orthopedic Surgery. He wrote many papers of medical literature and was writing a book on surgical procedure when he died in 1983, at the age of 78 in Rochester, Minnesota.
