= 1926 Providence Steam Roller season =

National Football League team season

- Head coach: Jim Laird

Results
- Record: 5–7–1
- League place: 11th in NFL

The 1926 Providence Steam Roller season was their second in the league. The team failed to improve on their previous season's output of 6–5–1, winning only five games. They finished eleventh in the 22 team league.

== Schedule ==
Week	Date	Opponent	Result	Record	Venue	Attendance	Sources
1	September 26	Brooklyn Lions	W 13–0	1–0	Cycledrome	7,000	
2	October 3	New York Giants	L 6–7	1–1	Cycledrome	8,000	
3	October 10	Columbus Tigers	W 19–0	2–1	Cycledrome		
4	October 24	Pottsville Maroons	W 14–0	3–1	Cycledrome	4,500	
5	October 30	at Frankford Yellow Jackets	W 7–6	4–1	Frankford Stadium	8,000	
6	October 31	Frankford Yellow Jackets	L 3–6	4–2	Cycledrome		
7	November 7	Los Angeles Buccaneers	L 6–7	4–3	Cycledrome	11,000	
8	November 11	Canton Bulldogs	W 21–2	5–3	Cycledrome	6,000	
9	November 14	Kansas City Cowboys	L 0–22	5–4	Cycledrome		
10	November 21	at New York Giants	L 0–21	5–5	Polo Grounds	10,000	
11	November 25	at Pottsville Maroons	L 0–8	5–6	Minersville Park		
12	November 28	Duluth Eskimos	T 0–0	5–6–1	Cycledrome		
13	December 11	at Frankford Yellow Jackets	L 0–24	5–7–1	Frankford Stadium	4,500	
Note: Thanksgiving Day: November 25.

== Standings ==
NFL standings
	W	L	T	PCT	PF	PA	STK
Frankford Yellow Jackets	14	1	2	.933	236	49	T1
Chicago Bears	12	1	3	.923	216	63	L1
Pottsville Maroons	10	2	2	.833	155	29	T1
Kansas City Cowboys	8	3	0	.727	76	53	W7
Green Bay Packers	7	3	3	.700	151	61	T1
New York Giants	8	4	1	.667	151	61	W3
Los Angeles Buccaneers	6	3	1	.667	67	57	L1
Duluth Eskimos	6	5	3	.545	113	81	L1
Buffalo Rangers	4	4	2	.500	53	62	T1
Chicago Cardinals	5	6	1	.455	74	98	L1
Providence Steam Roller	5	7	1	.417	89	103	L1
Detroit Panthers	4	6	2	.400	107	60	L3
Hartford Blues	3	7	0	.300	57	99	L1
Brooklyn Lions	3	8	0	.273	60	150	L3
Milwaukee Badgers	2	7	0	.222	41	66	L5
Dayton Triangles	1	4	1	.200	15	82	L2
Akron Indians	1	4	3	.200	23	89	T1
Racine Tornadoes	1	4	0	.200	8	92	L4
Columbus Tigers	1	6	0	.143	26	93	L5
Canton Bulldogs	1	9	3	.100	46	161	L1
Hammond Pros	0	4	0	.000	3	56	L4
Louisville Colonels	0	4	0	.000	0	108	L4

Note: Tie games were not officially counted in the standings until 1972.
