= 1926 Chicago Bears season =

NFL team season

- Owner: George S. Halas, Dutch Sternaman
- Head coach: George Halas
- Home stadium: Wrigley Field, Soldier Field

Results
- Record: 12–1–3
- League place: 2nd NFL

The 1926 season was the Chicago Bears' 7th in the National Football League. The team was able to improve on their 9–5–3 record from 1925 and finished with a 12–1–3 record under head coach George Halas (the team's best record in the first Halas era) earning them a second-place finish in the team standings, their fifth showing in that place in the last seven years.

== Regular season ==
This year's Bears may have been the most talented to date, with most of their veterans still playing well and the addition of talented veteran Paddy Driscoll and hard-running rookie William Senn. The Bears opened their season with 13 undefeated games (11 wins and 2 ties). Since ties didn't count in the standings at that time, the Bears were in first place since their main competition, the Frankford Yellow Jackets, had lost an earlier game to the Providence Steam Roller.

The showdown came on December 4 at Frankford. Neither team scored for the first three-quarters of this game; the tie was broken when Senn burst through the Frankford line for a 62-yard touchdown run. Driscoll missed the PAT, leaving Frankford a chance. Frankford proceeded to complete two long passes, the second for a score. Their kicker, Ernest Hamer, made the point after and Frankford won the game. Due to more victories, Frankford was the champion. The Bears were second yet again.

Driscoll was easily Chicago's best player in 1926, scoring 5 TDs, kicking 11 field goals, and converting 14 PATs. Senn scored 7 rushing touchdowns and Frank Hanny had 4 touchdown catches to lead the Bears.

== Schedule ==
Game	Date	Opponent	Result	Record	Venue	Attendance	Recap	Sources
1	September 19	at Milwaukee Badgers	W 10–7	1–0–0	Athletic Park		Recap	
2	September 26	at Green Bay Packers	T 6–6	1–0–1	City Stadium	7,000	Recap	
3	October 3	at Detroit Panthers	W 10–7	2–0–1	Navin Field	10,000	Recap	
4	October 10	New York Giants	W 7–0	3–0–1	Wrigley Field	8,000	Recap	
5	October 17	at Chicago Cardinals	W 16–0	4–0–1	Soldier Field	12,000	Recap	
6	October 24	Duluth Eskimos	W 24–6	5–0–1	Wrigley Field	12,000	Recap	
7	October 31	Akron Indians	W 17–0	6–0–1	Wrigley Field	6,500	Recap	
8	November 7	Louisville Colonels	W 34–0	7–0–1	Wrigley Field	7,000	Recap	
9	November 11	Chicago Cardinals	W 10–0	8–0–1	Wrigley Field	10,000	Recap	
10	November 14	Milwaukee Badgers	W 10–7	9–0–1	Wrigley Field	3,500	Recap	
11	November 21	Green Bay Packers	W 19–13	10–0–1	Wrigley Field	7,500	Recap	
12	November 25	Chicago Cardinals	T 0–0	10–0–2	Wrigley Field	8,000	Recap	
13	November 28	Canton Bulldogs	W 35–0	11–0–2	Wrigley Field	5,000	Recap	
14	December 4	at Frankford Yellow Jackets	L 6–7	11–1–2	Shibe Park	10,000	Recap	
15	December 12	Pottsville Maroons	W 9–7	12–1–2	Wrigley Field	5,500	Recap	
16	December 19	Green Bay Packers	T 3–3	12–1–3	Soldier Field	10,000	Recap	
Note: Thanksgiving: November 25.

== Standings ==
NFL standings
	W	L	T	PCT	PF	PA	STK
Frankford Yellow Jackets	14	1	2	.933	236	49	T1
Chicago Bears	12	1	3	.923	216	63	L1
Pottsville Maroons	10	2	2	.833	155	29	T1
Kansas City Cowboys	8	3	0	.727	76	53	W7
Green Bay Packers	7	3	3	.700	151	61	T1
New York Giants	8	4	1	.667	151	61	W3
Los Angeles Buccaneers	6	3	1	.667	67	57	L1
Duluth Eskimos	6	5	3	.545	113	81	L1
Buffalo Rangers	4	4	2	.500	53	62	T1
Chicago Cardinals	5	6	1	.455	74	98	L1
Providence Steam Roller	5	7	1	.417	89	103	L1
Detroit Panthers	4	6	2	.400	107	60	L3
Hartford Blues	3	7	0	.300	57	99	L1
Brooklyn Lions	3	8	0	.273	60	150	L3
Milwaukee Badgers	2	7	0	.222	41	66	L5
Dayton Triangles	1	4	1	.200	15	82	L2
Akron Indians	1	4	3	.200	23	89	T1
Racine Tornadoes	1	4	0	.200	8	92	L4
Columbus Tigers	1	6	0	.143	26	93	L5
Canton Bulldogs	1	9	3	.100	46	161	L1
Hammond Pros	0	4	0	.000	3	56	L4
Louisville Colonels	0	4	0	.000	0	108	L4

Note: Tie games were not officially counted in the standings until 1972.

== Roster ==
=== Future Hall of Fame players ===
- Paddy Driscoll, back (from Cardinals)
- George Halas, end
- Ed Healey, tackle
- Link Lyman, tackle (from Frankford)
- George Trafton, center

=== Other leading players ===
- William Senn, back (rookie from Knox College)
- Ed Sternaman, back
- Joe Sternaman, quarterback
- Laurie Walquist, quarterback

=== Players departed from 1925 ===
- Hunk Anderson, guard (retired)
- Red Grange, back (to New York Yankees of new American Football League)
