= Dinger Doane =

American football player (1893–1949)

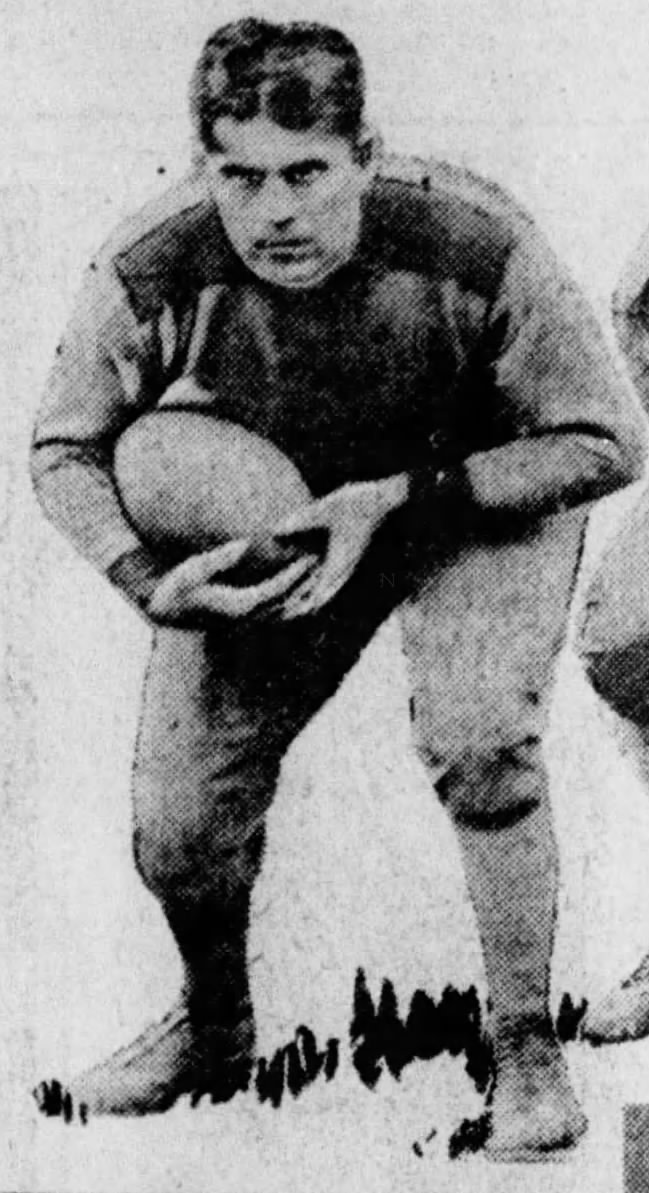
- Doane in 1925

Profile
- Positions: Fullback, end, guard, halfback

Personal information
- Born: October 14, 1893; Natick, Massachusetts
- Died: June 5, 1948 (aged 54)
- Listed height: 5 ft 10 in (1.78 m)
- Listed weight: 190 lb (86 kg)

Career information
- College: Tufts University

Career history
- Cleveland Tigers (1920); New York Brickley Giants (1921); Frankford Yellow Jackets (1921); Milwaukee Badgers (1922–1924); Detroit Panthers (1925–1926); Pottsville Maroons (1927); Providence Steam Roller (1927)
- Stats at Pro Football Reference

Erling Eugene "Dinger" Doane (October 14, 1893 – June 5, 1948) was an American football player. He excelled at football at Somerville High School from 1912 to 1914 before being a standout at Tufts University where he scored a touchdown in Tufts first formal win over Harvard in 1916. Following his college career, he played professionally in the National Football League with the Cleveland Tigers, Milwaukee Badgers, Detroit Panthers, Pottsville Maroons, Providence Steam Roller and the New York Brickley Giants. Brickley's New York Giants are not related to the modern-day New York Giants. He joined the pre-NFL Frankford Yellow Jackets briefly in 1921 for a game against the Union Quakers of Philadelphia.
