= 1926 Hartford Blues season =

National Football League team season

- Head coach: Jack Keogh
- Home stadium: Clarkin Field, East Hartford Velodrome

Results
- Record: 3–7
- League place: 13th NFL

The 1926 Hartford Blues season was their only season in the league. The team finished 3–7, finishing thirteenth in the league.

== Schedule ==
| Game | Date | Opponent | Result | Record | Venue | Attendance | Recap | Sources |
|---|---|---|---|---|---|---|---|---|
| 1 | September 26 | New York Giants | L 0–21 | 0–1 | East Hartford Velodrome | 6,500 | Recap | |
| 2 | October 2 | at Frankford Yellow Jackets | L 0–13 | 0–2 | Frankford Stadium | 5,000 | Recap | |
| 3 | October 3 | Frankford Yellow Jackets | L 0–10 | 0–3 | East Hartford Velodrome | 3,000 | Recap | |
| 4 | October 10 | at Brooklyn Lions | L 0–6 | 0–4 | Ebbets Field | 1,000 | Recap | |
| 5 | October 24 | Brooklyn Lions | W 16–6 | 1–4 | East Hartford Velodrome | 1,000 | Recap | |
| 6 | October 31 | Kansas City Cowboys | L 2–7 | 1–5 | East Hartford Velodrome | 500 | Recap | |
| 7 | November 7 | Canton Bulldogs | W 16–7 | 2–5 | East Hartford Velodrome | 4,500 | Recap | |
| 8 | November 14 | Buffalo Rangers | L 7–13 | 2–6 | East Hartford Velodrome | | Recap | |
| 9 | November 21 | Dayton Triangles | W 16–0 | 3–6 | East Hartford Velodrome | | Recap | |
| 10 | November 27 | Duluth Eskimos | L 0–16 | 3–7 | East Hartford Velodrome | | Recap | |

== Roster ==
Hartford Blues 1926 roster
| Eddie Barnikow, FB; Jack Bonadies, G; Harry Brian, B; Chuck Corgan, B; Dilly Dally, G; Jim Donlin, G; Furlong Flynn, G; Jim Foley, B; Jake Friedman, E; Hec Garvey, G; Dennis Gildea, C; Dimp Halloran, TB; John Harris, HB; Lefty Jamerson, E; Eddie Keenan, G; Eddie Lynch, E; Jim Manning, TB; Ernie McCann, T; Elmer McCormick, C | Ed McEvoy, WB; Harry McMahon, BB; Ralph Nichols, T; Dick Noble, G; Grat O'Connell, E; Frank O'Connor, T; Red O'Neill, C; Jack Perrin, BB; Vic Radzievitch, B; Joe Santone, G; Rocky Segretta, E; Stan Sieracki, T; Ken Simendinger, HB; Lou Smyth, B; Al Thomas, B; Enid Thomas, WB; Dutch Webber, E; Mule Werwaiss, T; Henry Zehrer, FB |

== Standings ==
NFL standings
| | W | L | T | PCT | PF | PA | STK |
|---|---|---|---|---|---|---|---|
| Frankford Yellow Jackets | 14 | 1 | 2 | .933 | 236 | 49 | T1 |
| Chicago Bears | 12 | 1 | 3 | .923 | 216 | 63 | L1 |
| Pottsville Maroons | 10 | 2 | 2 | .833 | 155 | 29 | T1 |
| Kansas City Cowboys | 8 | 3 | 0 | .727 | 76 | 53 | W7 |
| Green Bay Packers | 7 | 3 | 3 | .700 | 151 | 61 | T1 |
| New York Giants | 8 | 4 | 1 | .667 | 151 | 61 | W3 |
| Los Angeles Buccaneers | 6 | 3 | 1 | .667 | 67 | 57 | L1 |
| Duluth Eskimos | 6 | 5 | 3 | .545 | 113 | 81 | L1 |
| Buffalo Rangers | 4 | 4 | 2 | .500 | 53 | 62 | T1 |
| Chicago Cardinals | 5 | 6 | 1 | .455 | 74 | 98 | L1 |
| Providence Steam Roller | 5 | 7 | 1 | .417 | 89 | 103 | L1 |
| Detroit Panthers | 4 | 6 | 2 | .400 | 107 | 60 | L3 |
| Hartford Blues | 3 | 7 | 0 | .300 | 57 | 99 | L1 |
| Brooklyn Lions | 3 | 8 | 0 | .273 | 60 | 150 | L3 |
| Milwaukee Badgers | 2 | 7 | 0 | .222 | 41 | 66 | L5 |
| Dayton Triangles | 1 | 4 | 1 | .200 | 15 | 82 | L2 |
| Akron Indians | 1 | 4 | 3 | .200 | 23 | 89 | T1 |
| Racine Tornadoes | 1 | 4 | 0 | .200 | 8 | 92 | L4 |
| Columbus Tigers | 1 | 6 | 0 | .143 | 26 | 93 | L5 |
| Canton Bulldogs | 1 | 9 | 3 | .100 | 46 | 161 | L1 |
| Hammond Pros | 0 | 4 | 0 | .000 | 3 | 56 | L4 |
| Louisville Colonels | 0 | 4 | 0 | .000 | 0 | 108 | L4 |

Note: Tie games were not officially counted in the standings until 1972.
