= 1926 New York Giants season =

NFL team 2nd season

- Owner: Tim Mara
- Head coach: Doc Alexander
- Home stadium: Polo Grounds

Results
- Record: 8–4–1
- League place: 6th NFL

The 1926 New York Giants season was the franchise's 2nd season in the National Football League. They ended with an 8–4–1 regular season record and had one postseason appearance against the AFL Philadelphia Quakers, which the Giants won 31–0.

== Schedule ==
Week	Date	Opponent	Result	Record	Venue
1	September 26	at Hartford Blues	W 21–0	1–0	
2	October 3	at Providence Steam Roller	W 7–6	2–0	
3	October 10	at Chicago Bears	L 0–7	2–1	
4	October 16	at Frankford Yellow Jackets	L 0–6	2–2	
5	October 17	Frankford Yellow Jackets	L 0–6	2–3	
6	October 24	Kansas City Cowboys	W 13–0	3–3	
7	November 2	Canton Bulldogs	T 7–7	3–3–1	
8	November 7	Chicago Cardinals	W 20–0	4–3–1	
9	November 11	Duluth Eskimos	W 14–13	5–3–1	
10	November 14	Los Angeles Buccaneers	L 0–6	5–4–1	
11	November 21	Providence Steam Roller	W 21–0	6–4–1	
12	November 25	at Brooklyn Lions	W 17–0	7–4–1	
13	November 28	Brooklyn Lions	W 27–0	8–4–1	
14	December 12	Philadelphia Quakers (AFL (I))	W 31–0	8–4–1	

== Standings ==
NFL standings
	W	L	T	PCT	PF	PA	STK
Frankford Yellow Jackets	14	1	2	.933	236	49	T1
Chicago Bears	12	1	3	.923	216	63	L1
Pottsville Maroons	10	2	2	.833	155	29	T1
Kansas City Cowboys	8	3	0	.727	76	53	W7
Green Bay Packers	7	3	3	.700	151	61	T1
New York Giants	8	4	1	.667	147	51	W3
Los Angeles Buccaneers	6	3	1	.667	67	57	L1
Duluth Eskimos	6	5	3	.545	113	81	L1
Buffalo Rangers	4	4	2	.500	53	62	T1
Chicago Cardinals	5	6	1	.455	74	98	L1
Providence Steam Roller	5	7	1	.417	89	103	L1
Detroit Panthers	4	6	2	.400	107	60	L3
Hartford Blues	3	7	0	.300	57	99	L1
Brooklyn Lions	3	8	0	.273	60	150	L3
Milwaukee Badgers	2	7	0	.222	41	66	L5
Dayton Triangles	1	4	1	.200	15	82	L2
Akron Indians	1	4	3	.200	23	89	T1
Racine Tornadoes	1	4	0	.200	8	92	L4
Columbus Tigers	1	6	0	.143	26	93	L5
Canton Bulldogs	1	9	3	.100	46	161	L1
Hammond Pros	0	4	0	.000	3	56	L4
Louisville Colonels	0	4	0	.000	0	108	L4

Note: Tie games were not officially counted in the standings until 1972.

== See also ==
- List of New York Giants seasons
