= Steve Hanson (American football) =

American football player (1902–1981)

Profile
- Position: End

Personal information
- Born: April 27, 1902; Racine, Wisconsin, U.S.
- Died: August 1, 1981 (aged 79); Racine, Wisconsin, U.S.
- Listed height: 6 ft 2 in (1.88 m)
- Listed weight: 192 lb (87 kg)

Career information
- High school: Racine (WI)
- College: Carthage

Career history
- Kansas City Cowboys (1925); Louisville Colonels (1926)

Career statistics
- Games played: 1
- Stats at Pro Football Reference

Stephen Harold Hanson (April 27, 1902 – August 1, 1981) was a player in the National Football League (NFL). He was a member of the Kansas City Cowboys during the 1925 NFL season, but did not see any playing time during a regular season game. The following season, he was a member of the Louisville Colonels.

From Racine, Wisconsin, Hanson was also a prominent basketball player for local teams.
