= 1926 Frankford Yellow Jackets season =

National Football League team season

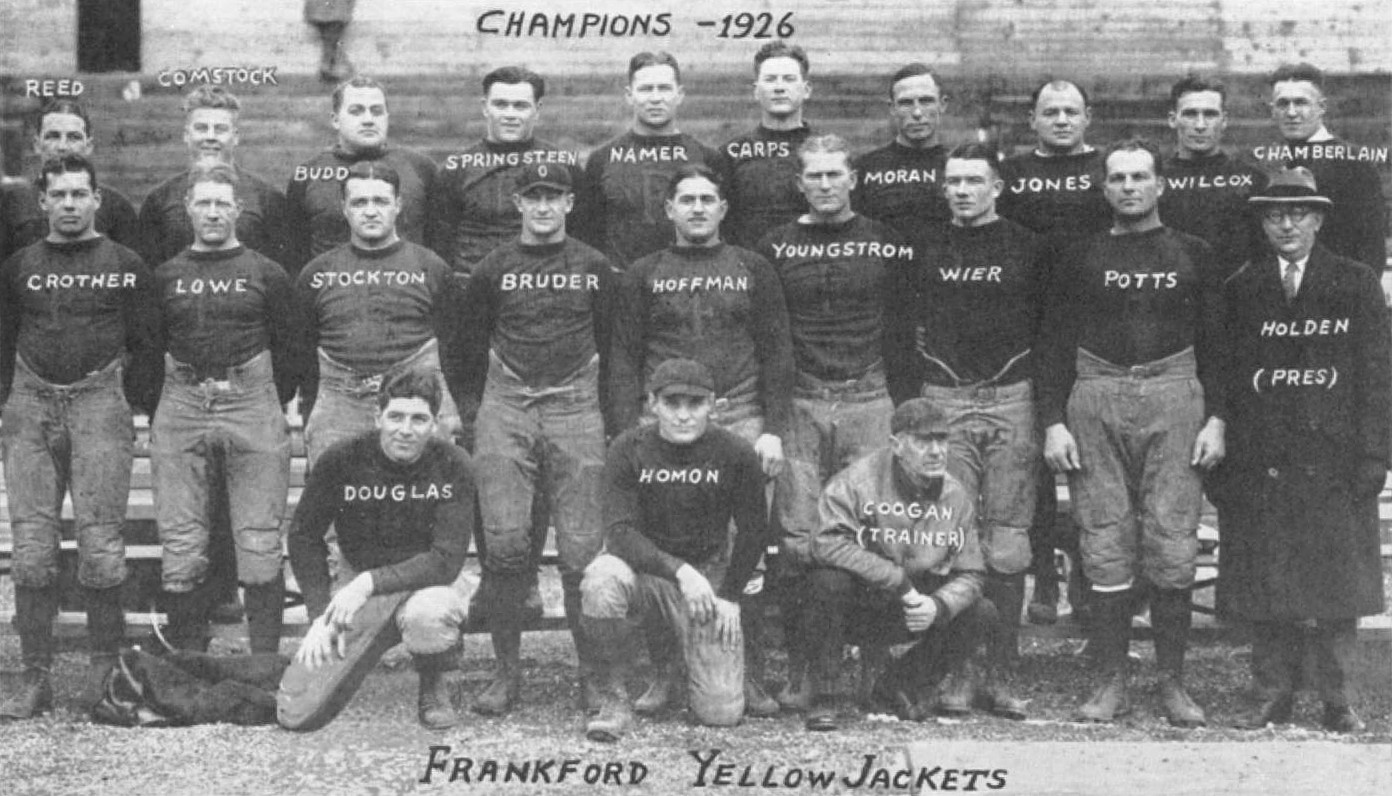
- Head coach: Guy Chamberlin
- Home stadium: Frankford Stadium

Results
- Record: 14–1–2 NFL (16–1–2 Overall)
- League place: 1st NFL

The 1926 Frankford Yellow Jackets season was their third in the National Football League. The team improved on their previous output of 10–4, winning fourteen games. By virtue of their league-best record of 14–1–2, they were crowned the 1926 NFL Champions.

Incidentally, the champions of the rival American Football League that year were also based in Philadelphia, the Philadelphia Quakers. There had been some brief discussion of fulfilling the crosstown rivalry by staging an interleague championship between the Quakers and Yellow Jackets, but the Yellow Jackets declined. (The Quakers instead played the seventh-place New York Giants, losing 31–0.)

== Schedule ==
Game	Date	Opponent	Result	Record	Venue	Attendance	Recap	Sources
–	September 19	at Atlantic City Shore Roses	W 45–0		Airport Field	2,000		
1	September 25	Akron Indians	T 6–6	0–0–1	Frankford Stadium	7,000	Recap	
2	October 2	Hartford Blues	W 13–0	1–0–1	Frankford Stadium	5,000	Recap	
3	October 3	at Hartford Blues	W 10–0	2–0–1	East Hartford Velodrome	3,000	Recap	
4	October 9	Buffalo Rangers	W 30–0	3–0–1	Frankford Stadium	6,000	Recap	
5	October 16	New York Giants	W 6–0	4–0–1	Frankford Stadium	7,000	Recap	
6	October 17	at New York Giants	W 6–0	5–0–1	Polo Grounds	15,000	Recap	
7	October 23	Canton Bulldogs	W 17–0	6–0–1	Frankford Stadium	4,000	Recap	
8	October 30	Providence Steam Roller	L 6–7	6–1–1	Frankford Stadium	8,000	Recap	
9	October 31	at Providence Steam Roller	W 6–3	7–1–1	Cycledrome		Recap	
10	November 6	Chicago Cardinals	W 33–7	8–1–1	Frankford Stadium	8,000	Recap	
11	November 13	Duluth Eskimos	W 10–0	9–1–1	Frankford Stadium	6,000	Recap	
12	November 20	Dayton Triangles	W 35–0	10–1–1	Frankford Stadium	6,000	Recap	
–	November 21	at Clifton Heights Orange & Black	W 10–0		Kent Field	10,000		
13	November 25	Green Bay Packers	W 20–14	11–1–1	Frankford Stadium	10,000	Recap	
14	November 27	Detroit Panthers	W 7–6	12–1–1	Frankford Stadium	6,000	Recap	
15	December 4	Chicago Bears	W 7–6	13–1–1	Shibe Park	10,000	Recap	
16	December 11	Providence Steam Roller	W 24–0	14–1–1	Frankford Stadium	4,500	Recap	
17	December 18	Pottsville Maroons	T 0–0	14–1–2	Frankford Stadium	2,000	Recap	
Note: Games in italics are against non-NFL teams. Thanksgiving Day: November 25.

== Standings ==
NFL standings
	W	L	T	PCT	PF	PA	STK
Frankford Yellow Jackets	14	1	2	.933	236	49	T1
Chicago Bears	12	1	3	.923	216	63	L1
Pottsville Maroons	10	2	2	.833	155	29	T1
Kansas City Cowboys	8	3	0	.727	76	53	W7
Green Bay Packers	7	3	3	.700	151	61	T1
New York Giants	8	4	1	.667	147	51	W3
Los Angeles Buccaneers	6	3	1	.667	67	57	L1
Duluth Eskimos	6	5	3	.545	113	81	L1
Buffalo Rangers	4	4	2	.500	53	62	T1
Chicago Cardinals	5	6	1	.455	74	98	L1
Providence Steam Roller	5	7	1	.417	89	103	L1
Detroit Panthers	4	6	2	.400	107	60	L3
Hartford Blues	3	7	0	.300	57	99	L1
Brooklyn Lions	3	8	0	.273	60	150	L3
Milwaukee Badgers	2	7	0	.222	41	66	L5
Dayton Triangles	1	4	1	.200	15	82	L2
Akron Indians	1	4	3	.200	23	89	T1
Racine Tornadoes	1	4	0	.200	8	92	L4
Columbus Tigers	1	6	0	.143	26	93	L5
Canton Bulldogs	1	9	3	.100	46	161	L1
Hammond Pros	0	4	0	.000	3	56	L4
Louisville Colonels	0	4	0	.000	0	108	L4

Note: Tie games were not officially counted in the standings until 1972.
