= Red Seidelson =

Romanian-born American football player

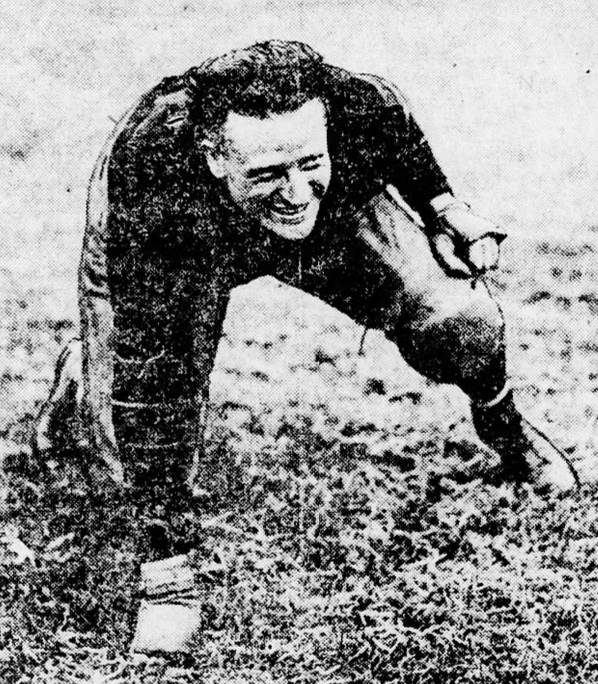
- Seidelson, c. 1923

No. 15, 10
- Position: Tackle / guard

Personal information
- Born: August 13, 1901; Romania
- Died: July 4, 1986 (aged 84); Pittsburgh, Pennsylvania, U.S.
- Listed height: 6 ft 1 in (1.85 m)
- Listed weight: 202 lb (92 kg)

Career information
- High school: Fifth Avenue (Pittsburgh); Schenley (Pittsburgh)
- College: Pittsburgh (1920–1923)

Career history

Playing
- Pittsburgh Lyceum (1924); Toronto Tigers (1925); Frankford Yellow Jackets (1925); Akron Indians (1926)

Coaching
- Culver Military Academy (1924) Assistant coach

Career NFL statistics
- Games played: 16
- Games started: 14

Harry "Red" Seidelson (born Pinicus Hersch Seidelson; August 13, 1901 – July 4, 1986) was a Romanian-born American professional football player.

He grew up in Pittsburgh, Pennsylvania, and played college football for the Pittsburgh Panthers under Pop Warner, earning acclaim as one of their greatest guards at the time. After a brief coaching stint, Seidelson played professional football for the Frankford Yellow Jackets and Akron Indians of the National Football League (NFL) in 1925 and 1926. He also had stints with the non-NFL Pittsburgh Lyceum and Toronto Tigers. During and after his playing career, Seidelson worked as a dentist in Pittsburgh.

== Early life ==
Pinicus Hersch Seidelson was born on August 13, 1901, in Romania, and was Jewish. He was one of five children and his father, Max, worked at Forbes Field after the family moved to the U.S. around 1908. In the U.S., he went under the name Harry Seidelson. He grew up in the Hill District of Pittsburgh, Pennsylvania, playing football and baseball. He was also a street fighter and boxer; his grandson described his fighting reputation as such that the district police officers sometimes asked him to come with them as "insurance" if they expected "any sticky situations" in their cases. He was a standout in football and baseball in high school, attending Fifth Avenue High School before transferring to Schenley High School. Seidelson graduated from Schenley in 1919.

== College career ==
After Seidelson graduated from Schenley, he was watching the football team play a year later and "anyone could see he would have liked to get in and join them". He was noticed by Andrew Kerr, a math professor at Schenley as well as the freshman football coach for the Pittsburgh Panthers of the University of Pittsburgh. They had a conversation and Kerr was able to get him to join Pittsburgh in 1920, where Seidelson was enrolled in the School of Dental Medicine. When he first joined the Panthers, Seidelson was put at quarterback, but head coach Pop Warner switched him to guard after noticing his "vicious blocks". He was a reserve for Pittsburgh in 1921 but showed "a lot of improvement through the season".

Standing at 6 feet 1 inch (1.85 m) and weighing 183 pounds (83 kg) for the Panthers, Seidelson was described in the Pittsburgh Post-Gazette as not "so big, as guards go. But it's enough. It represents about as well-rounded physical development as there is on the squad, a fine combination of sheer power with agility". He was limited by injuries in 1922 and also played behind the team's star guard Jack Sack. He also saw some time as a starting right tackle and earned a varsity letter for the 1922 season. Seidelson succeeded Sack as Pittsburgh's leading guard in 1923 and was considered one of the best at his position on the East coast. He was honored with a gold football by the Panthers following the season.

The Press-Gazette noted that Seidelson played "spectacular" at Pittsburgh, while The Pittsburgh Press described him as "one of the toughest and best guards that ever wore a Panther uniform". He was often used as the lead blocker for runs by Karl Bohren; Bohren later was a member of the same professional team as Seidelson and said that "I'd recognize your back anywhere. It seems I have been running behind it ever since I started playing football". Coach Pop Warner wrote a book about football and in it included a sketch of Seidelson as an "illustration of the perfect lineman's stance".

== Professional career ==
In 1924, Seidelson became an assistant football coach at Culver Military Academy in Indiana. He also played professionally for the Pittsburgh Lyceum. In 1925, he began the season with the Toronto Tigers in Ohio before joining the Frankford Yellow Jackets of the National Football League (NFL). He replaced Jim Welsh as starting guard for the Yellow Jackets and also saw playing time at tackle. Seidelson became the NFL's first Romanian-born player. He appeared in nine NFL games, seven as a starter, during the 1925 season, as the Yellow Jackets placed sixth in the league with a record of 13–7. The Yellow Jackets also played many non-NFL games; according to Jews in Sports, Seidelson appeared in over 40 games in his year with Frankford. This included five games around Thanksgiving: "we played Saturday and Sunday, the next Thursday and then two more the following weekend. When they came to get me out of bed for that last game, I thought they would have to get a derrick. I could hardly move," he said.

After his season with the Yellow Jackets, Seidelson joined the Pittsburgh All-Stars for their game against the Chicago Bears. Players were promised $300 if they beat the Bears and they did by a score of 24–0. The following season, he appeared in seven games as a starter for the Akron Indians, with the Indians compiling a record of 1–4–3. After the season, he retired. Seidelson concluded his career having appeared in 16 NFL games, 14 as a starter. He weighed 202 pounds (92 kg) during his professional career.

At the same time as his NFL career, Seidelson worked as a dentist and had an office in Pittsburgh. Jews in Sports explained that he "had a special agreement with Frankford because his home and practice were in Pittsburgh but the Yellow Jackets were located near Philadelphia, on the other side of the state. Harry would practice dentistry Monday through Thursday, board a train Thursday evening, practice with Frankford Friday, play two games on the weekend, then board a train Sunday night to return to Pittsburgh."

== Later life and death ==
After retiring from football, Seidelson continued working as a dentist for over 40 years. He also worked for the Head Start program. Seidelson was a Republican Party candidate for the Pittsburgh City Council in 1951. With his wife, Freda, he had a daughter and a son. He died in Pittsburgh on July 4, 1986, of heart failure, aged 84.
