= Punk Berryman =

American football player and coach (1892–1966)

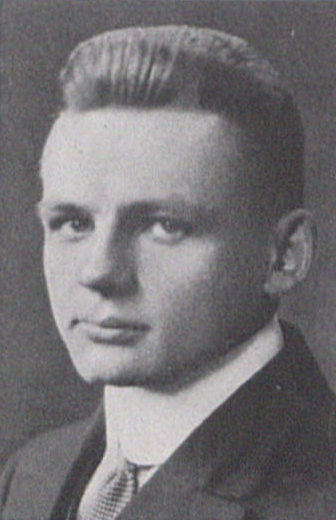
- Berryman pictured in La Vie 1915, Penn State yearbook

Biographical details
- Born: May 18, 1892; Philadelphia, Pennsylvania, U.S.
- Died: May 18, 1966 (aged 74); Brasília, Brazil

Playing career

Football
- 1911–1915: Penn State
- Position: Halfback

Coaching career (HC unless noted)

Football
- 1916: Gettysburg
- 1917: Lafayette
- 1922–1923: Colgate (assistant)
- 1924: Frankford Yellow Jackets
- 1925: Millville Football & Athletic Club
- 1926: Brooklyn Lions

Basketball
- 1919–1920: Iowa State

Head coaching record
- Overall: 8–9 (college football); 14–10–1 (NFL); 6–12 (college basketball)

Accomplishments and honors

Awards
- Third-team All-American (1915)

Robert Norman "Punk" Berryman (May 18, 1892 – May 18, 1966) was an American football player and coach. He played as a halfback at Pennsylvania State University and was selected as third-team All-American in 1915, his senior year. Berryman served as the head football coach at Gettysburg College in 1916 and at Lafayette College in 1917. He was subsequently an assistant football coach at the University of Iowa and Dickinson College. Berryman served as the head basketball coach at Iowa State University during the 1919–20 season; his team finished the season with an overall record of 6–12, placing seventh in the Missouri Valley Intercollegiate Athletic Association with a conference mark of 2–10. In 1922 and 1923 Berryman was an assistant coach at Colgate University under fellow Penn State alumnus, Dick Harlow. In 1924, he coached the Frankford Yellow Jackets, newly enfranchised to the National Football League (NFL), to a record of 11–2–1, good enough for only a third-place finish. The following season, Berryman coached the Millville Football & Athletic Club. In 1926, he coached the Brooklyn Lions to a record of 3–8 in their only season with the NFL. Berryman was born on May 18, 1892. He attended the Northeast Manual Training School in Philadelphia. He died in May 1966.

== Head coaching record ==
=== College football ===
Year	Team	Overall	Conference	Standing	Bowl/playoffs
Gettysburg (Independent) (1916)
1916	Gettysburg	5–4			
Gettysburg:		5–4			
Lafayette (Independent) (1917)
1917	Lafayette	3–5			
Lafayette:		3–5			
Total:		8–9			

=== College basketball ===
Record table
Season	Team	Overall	Conference	Standing	Postseason
Iowa State Cyclones (Missouri Valley Intercollegiate Athletic Association) (1919–1920)
1919–20	Iowa State	6–12	2–10	7th	
Iowa State:		6–12	2–10		
Total:		6–12			

=== NFL ===
Team	Year	Regular season					Postseason			
Team	Year	Won	Lost	Ties	Win %	Finish	Won	Lost	Win %	Result
FYJ	1924	11	2	1	.821	3rd in NFL	–	–	–	–
BRL	1926	3	8	0	.273	14th in NFL	–	–	–	–
Total		14	10	1	.580		–	–	–	
