= 1926 Detroit Panthers season =

National Football League team season

- Head coach: Jimmy Conzelman
- Home stadium: Navin Field

Results
- Record: 4–6–2
- League place: 12th NFL

The 1926 Detroit Panthers season was their second and final year in the league. Despite playing 9 of their 12 games at home, the team failed to improve on their previous output of 8–2–2, winning only 4 times and finishing 12th out of 22 teams

== Schedule ==
| Game | Date | Opponent | Result | Record | Venue | Attendance | Recap | Sources |
|---|---|---|---|---|---|---|---|---|
| 1 | September 19 | at Green Bay Packers | L 21–0 | 0–1 | City Stadium | 4,500 | Recap | |
| 2 | September 26 | at Milwaukee Badgers | L 6–0 | 0–2 | Athletic Park | 2,500 | Recap | |
| 3 | October 3 | Chicago Bears | L 10–7 | 0–3 | Navin Field | 10,000 | Recap | |
| 4 | October 10 | Kansas City Cowboys | W 10–0 | 1–3 | Navin Field | | Recap | |
| 5 | October 17 | Louisville Colonels | W 47–0 | 2–3 | Navin Field | | Recap | |
| 6 | October 24 | Akron Indians | W 25–0 | 3–3 | Navin Field | | Recap | |
| 7 | October 31 | Canton Bulldogs | W 6–0 | 4–3 | Navin Field | | Recap | |
| 8 | November 7 | Duluth Eskimos | T 0–0 | 4–3–1 | Navin Field | 21,000 | Recap | |
| 9 | November 14 | Dayton Triangles | T 0–0 | 4–3–2 | Navin Field | | Recap | |
| 10 | November 25 | Los Angeles Buccaneers | L 9–6 | 4–4–2 | Navin Field | 7,000 | Recap | |
| 11 | November 27 | at Frankford Yellow Jackets | L 7–6 | 4–5–2 | Frankford Stadium | 6,000 | Recap | |
| 12 | November 28 | Green Bay Packers | L 7–0 | 4–6–2 | Navin Field | 1,000 | Recap | |
| — | December 6 | vs. Detroit Tigers | Postponed due to snow. | | | | | |
| — | December 13 | vs. Detroit Tigers | W 9–0 | — | Navin Field | | — | |
Note: Games in italics was against non-NFL team. Thanksgiving Day: November 25.

== Standings ==
Program for the Panthers' September 19th season debut at Green Bay.

NFL standings
| | W | L | T | PCT | PF | PA | STK |
|---|---|---|---|---|---|---|---|
| Frankford Yellow Jackets | 14 | 1 | 2 | .933 | 236 | 49 | T1 |
| Chicago Bears | 12 | 1 | 3 | .923 | 216 | 63 | L1 |
| Pottsville Maroons | 10 | 2 | 2 | .833 | 155 | 29 | T1 |
| Kansas City Cowboys | 8 | 3 | 0 | .727 | 76 | 53 | W7 |
| Green Bay Packers | 7 | 3 | 3 | .700 | 151 | 61 | T1 |
| New York Giants | 8 | 4 | 1 | .667 | 151 | 61 | W3 |
| Los Angeles Buccaneers | 6 | 3 | 1 | .667 | 67 | 57 | L1 |
| Duluth Eskimos | 6 | 5 | 3 | .545 | 113 | 81 | L1 |
| Buffalo Rangers | 4 | 4 | 2 | .500 | 53 | 62 | T1 |
| Chicago Cardinals | 5 | 6 | 1 | .455 | 74 | 98 | L1 |
| Providence Steam Roller | 5 | 7 | 1 | .417 | 89 | 103 | L1 |
| Detroit Panthers | 4 | 6 | 2 | .400 | 107 | 60 | L3 |
| Hartford Blues | 3 | 7 | 0 | .300 | 57 | 99 | L1 |
| Brooklyn Lions | 3 | 8 | 0 | .273 | 60 | 150 | L3 |
| Milwaukee Badgers | 2 | 7 | 0 | .222 | 41 | 66 | L5 |
| Dayton Triangles | 1 | 4 | 1 | .200 | 15 | 82 | L2 |
| Akron Indians | 1 | 4 | 3 | .200 | 23 | 89 | T1 |
| Racine Tornadoes | 1 | 4 | 0 | .200 | 8 | 92 | L4 |
| Columbus Tigers | 1 | 6 | 0 | .143 | 26 | 93 | L5 |
| Canton Bulldogs | 1 | 9 | 3 | .100 | 46 | 161 | L1 |
| Hammond Pros | 0 | 4 | 0 | .000 | 3 | 56 | L4 |
| Louisville Colonels | 0 | 4 | 0 | .000 | 0 | 108 | L4 |

Note: Tie games were not officially counted in the standings until 1972.

== Roster ==
- John Barrett, center, 11 games, 170 pounds, 5-6, Univ. of Detroit
- John Cameron, guard, 8 games, 175 pounds, Kalamazoo, Central Michigan
- Jimmy Conzelman, back, 12 games, 175 pounds, 6-0 Washington (MO)
- Al Crook, center, 8 games, 190 pounds, 5-10, Washington & Jefferson
- Dinger Doane, fullback, 12 games, 190 pounds, 5-10 Tufts
- Tom Edwards, tackle, 12 games, 185 pounds, 5-11, Central Michigan, Michigan
- Jack Fleischman, guard, 11 games, 184 pounds, 5-6, Purdue
- Bruce Gregory, tailback, 12 games, 170 pounds, 5-10, Michigan
- Charlie Grube, end, 2 games, 175 pounds, 5-10, Michigan
- Al Hadden, wingback, 12 games, 186 pounds, 5-9, Washington & Jefferson
- Norm Harvey, tackle, 8 games, 196 pounds, 6-0, Univ. of Detroit
- Vivian Hultman, end, 10 games, 178 pounds, 5-8, Michigan St.
- Dutch Lauer, end, 10 games, 185 pounds, 5-10, Univ. of Detroit
- Eddie Lynch, end, 12 games, 191 pounds, 6-0, Catholic
- Dutch Marion, fullback, 12 games, 180 pounds, 5-9, Washington & Jefferson, Michigan
- Tom McNamara, guard, 11 games, 210 pounds, 5-10, Tufts, Univ. of Detroit
- Eddie Scharer, back, 12 games, 165 pounds, 5-6, Univ. of Detroit, Notre Dame
- Gus Sonnenberg, tackle, 12 games, 196 pounds, 5-6, Dartmouth, Univ. or Detroit
- Dick Vick, wingback, 6 games, 167 pounds, 5-9, Washington & Jefferson

== Post-Season ==
The Panthers concluded their 1926 season with a December 13 game against another local professional team, the Detroit Tigers, in an event billed as the city's professional championship. Originally scheduled for December 6, the game had to be delayed one week due to four inches of snow covering Navin Field, rendering it unplayable. Things were little better on the 13th, with the track slippery and slow, but the Panthers managed a 9–0 win over a hapless opponent that failed to make even one first down during the contest.

Plans were made for a third campaign in 1927, with rumors circulating in April that the team had landed University of Michigan passing sensation Benny Friedman, with Friedman explicitly denying a report that he had agreed to terms with the club at a secret meeting in Cleveland.

With the NFL attempting to pare down weak franchises in 1927 by raising the amount of each team's assurance money to the league office and forcing a commitment to play at least four home games with a visitors' guarantee of $3,000 per game, the Panthers ultimately were one of ten teams falling to the wayside and terminating operations.

The Cleveland-born Benny Friedman ultimately signed a contract that July to play with a new Cleveland Bulldogs franchise owned by a syndicate headed by Herbert Brandt.
