= 1926 Kansas City Cowboys season =

National Football League team season

- Head coach: Roy Andrews
- Home stadium: Muehlebach Field

Results
- Record: 8–3
- League place: 4th NFL

The 1926 Kansas City Cowboys season was their third and final season in the league. The team improved on their previous output of 2–5–1, winning eight games. They finished fourth in the league.

== Schedule ==
Week	Date	Opponent	Result	Record	Venue
1	September 19	at Duluth Eskimos	L 0–7	0–1	Athletic Park
2	Bye				
3	Bye				
4	October 10	at Detroit Panthers	L 0–10	0–2	Navin Field
5	October 16	at Columbus Tigers	W 9–0	1–2	West Side Athletic Club
6	October 24	at New York Giants	L 0–13	1–3	Polo Grounds
7	October 31	at Hartford Blues	W 7–2	2–3	East Hartford Velodrome
8	November 7	at Brooklyn Lions	W 10–9	3–3	Ebbets Field
9	November 14	at Providence Steam Roller	W 22–0	4–3	Cycledrome
10	November 21	at Buffalo Rangers	W 2–0	5–3	Bison Stadium
11	November 28	at Chicago Cardinals	W 7–2	6–3	Soldier Field
12	December 5	Los Angeles Buccaneers	W 7–3	7–3	Muehlebach Field
13	December 12	Duluth Eskimos	W 12–7	8–3	Muehlebach Field

== Standings ==
NFL standings
	W	L	T	PCT	PF	PA	STK
Frankford Yellow Jackets	14	1	2	.933	236	49	T1
Chicago Bears	12	1	3	.923	216	63	L1
Pottsville Maroons	10	2	2	.833	155	29	T1
Kansas City Cowboys	8	3	0	.727	76	53	W7
Green Bay Packers	7	3	3	.700	151	61	T1
New York Giants	8	4	1	.667	151	61	W3
Los Angeles Buccaneers	6	3	1	.667	67	57	L1
Duluth Eskimos	6	5	3	.545	113	81	L1
Buffalo Rangers	4	4	2	.500	53	62	T1
Chicago Cardinals	5	6	1	.455	74	98	L1
Providence Steam Roller	5	7	1	.417	89	103	L1
Detroit Panthers	4	6	2	.400	107	60	L3
Hartford Blues	3	7	0	.300	57	99	L1
Brooklyn Lions	3	8	0	.273	60	150	L3
Milwaukee Badgers	2	7	0	.222	41	66	L5
Dayton Triangles	1	4	1	.200	15	82	L2
Akron Indians	1	4	3	.200	23	89	T1
Racine Tornadoes	1	4	0	.200	8	92	L4
Columbus Tigers	1	6	0	.143	26	93	L5
Canton Bulldogs	1	9	3	.100	46	161	L1
Hammond Pros	0	4	0	.000	3	56	L4
Louisville Colonels	0	4	0	.000	0	108	L4

Note: Tie games were not officially counted in the standings until 1972.
