= 1926 Buffalo Rangers season =

National Football League team season

- Head coach: Jim Kendrick
- Home stadium: Bison Stadium

Results
- Record: 4–4–2
- Division place: 9th NFL

The 1926 Buffalo Rangers season was their seventh in the league. The team improved on their previous output of 1–6–2, winning four games. They finished ninth in the league.

== Background ==
In response to the creation of the Los Angeles Buccaneers, the revival of the Louisville Colonels as well as the AFL I's Los Angeles Wildcats, Buffalo (under new coach Jim Kendrick) changed its name for one year to the Buffalo Rangers, also known as the Texas Rangers. The team, although remaining based in Buffalo, would consist mostly of players from the state of Texas and the Southwestern United States. (Coincidentally, there was—and is—a city known as Buffalo, Texas.) The team had little to lose; after the retirement of star player and part-owner Tommy Hughitt after the 1924 season, the team slid to 1–6–2 in 1925.

Although the team returned to .500 play, sporting a 4–4–2 record (the best record the team would have without Hughitt), the experiment was not continued after 1926.

== Schedule ==
| Game | Date | Opponent | Result | Record | Venue | Attendance | Recap | Sources |
|---|---|---|---|---|---|---|---|---|
| 1 | September 26 | Akron Indians | W 7–0 | 1–0 | Bison Stadium | 2,500 | Recap | |
| 2 | October 3 | Dayton Triangles | L 0–3 | 1–1 | Bison Stadium | 5,000 | Recap | |
| 3 | October 9 | at Frankford Yellow Jackets | L 0–30 | 1–2 | Frankford Stadium | 6,000 | Recap | |
| 4 | October 17 | at Dayton Triangles | W 7–6 | 2–2 | Triangle Park | 1,500 | Recap | |
| 5 | October 24 | Los Angeles Buccaneers | T 0–0 | 2–2–1 | Bison Stadium | 3,000 | Recap | |
| 6 | October 31 | at Pottsville Maroons | L 0–14 | 2–3–1 | Minersville Park | | Recap | |
| 7 | November 7 | Columbus Tigers | W 26–0 | 3–3–1 | Bison Stadium | 3,500 | Recap | |
| 8 | November 14 | at Hartford Blues | W 13–7 | 4–3–1 | East Hartford Velodrome | | Recap | |
| 9 | November 21 | Kansas City Cowboys | L 0–2 | 4–4–1 | Bison Stadium | | Recap | |
| 10 | November 28 | at Pottsville Maroons | T 0–0 | 4–4–2 | Bison Stadium | | Recap | |

== Standings ==
NFL standings
| | W | L | T | PCT | PF | PA | STK |
|---|---|---|---|---|---|---|---|
| Frankford Yellow Jackets | 14 | 1 | 2 | .933 | 236 | 49 | T1 |
| Chicago Bears | 12 | 1 | 3 | .923 | 216 | 63 | L1 |
| Pottsville Maroons | 10 | 2 | 2 | .833 | 155 | 29 | T1 |
| Kansas City Cowboys | 8 | 3 | 0 | .727 | 76 | 53 | W7 |
| Green Bay Packers | 7 | 3 | 3 | .700 | 151 | 61 | T1 |
| New York Giants | 8 | 4 | 1 | .667 | 151 | 61 | W3 |
| Los Angeles Buccaneers | 6 | 3 | 1 | .667 | 67 | 57 | L1 |
| Duluth Eskimos | 6 | 5 | 3 | .545 | 113 | 81 | L1 |
| Buffalo Rangers | 4 | 4 | 2 | .500 | 53 | 62 | T1 |
| Chicago Cardinals | 5 | 6 | 1 | .455 | 74 | 98 | L1 |
| Providence Steam Roller | 5 | 7 | 1 | .417 | 89 | 103 | L1 |
| Detroit Panthers | 4 | 6 | 2 | .400 | 107 | 60 | L3 |
| Hartford Blues | 3 | 7 | 0 | .300 | 57 | 99 | L1 |
| Brooklyn Lions | 3 | 8 | 0 | .273 | 60 | 150 | L3 |
| Milwaukee Badgers | 2 | 7 | 0 | .222 | 41 | 66 | L5 |
| Dayton Triangles | 1 | 4 | 1 | .200 | 15 | 82 | L2 |
| Akron Indians | 1 | 4 | 3 | .200 | 23 | 89 | T1 |
| Racine Tornadoes | 1 | 4 | 0 | .200 | 8 | 92 | L4 |
| Columbus Tigers | 1 | 6 | 0 | .143 | 26 | 93 | L5 |
| Canton Bulldogs | 1 | 9 | 3 | .100 | 46 | 161 | L1 |
| Hammond Pros | 0 | 4 | 0 | .000 | 3 | 56 | L4 |
| Louisville Colonels | 0 | 4 | 0 | .000 | 0 | 108 | L4 |

Note: Tie games were not officially counted in the standings until 1972.
