= George Burnside (American football) =

American football player (1899–1962)

Profile
- Position: Blocking back

Personal information
- Born: January 21, 1899; Oconto Falls, Wisconsin
- Died: November 1, 1962 (aged 63); Seattle, Washington
- Listed height: 5 ft 9 in (1.75 m)
- Listed weight: 160 lb (73 kg)

Career information
- College: South Dakota, Wisconsin

Career history
- Racine Legion (1926)

Career statistics
- Games played: 2
- Stats at Pro Football Reference

George Harrison Burnside (January 21, 1899 – November 1, 1962) was a blocking back in the National Football League. He played with the Racine Tornadoes during the 1926 NFL season. He died on November 1, 1962, in Seattle.
