= 1926 Louisville Colonels season =

National Football League team season

- Head coach: Lenny Sachs

Results
- Record: 0–4
- League place: 22nd NFL

The 1926 Louisville Colonels season was their fourth and final season in the league and only season as the Colonels. Re-entering the NFL for the first time since the 1923 NFL season when they participated as the Louisville Brecks, the Colonels played four games and suffered shutout losses each time.

The 1926 Colonels suffered a 47–0 whitewashing at the hands of the Detroit Panthers and a 34–0 clocking by the Chicago Bears, with their 0 to 108 point differential effectively making the club the worst team in NFL history.

== Regular season ==
The 1926 Louisville Colonels was one of the worst teams in NFL history, going 0–4 and failing to score a single point.

Their October 17 game with the Detroit Panthers, a 47–0 whitewashing, epitomized the season. On the first play from scrimmage, with just 25 seconds off the clock, the Panthers scored on a scoop-and-score fumble recovery. "From the time of the first score until the exhibition concluded, the visitors saw their line riddled, their ends circled, and the defense torn to shreds," one local journalist noted. "So utterly helpless were the Colonels that the Panthers employed every play they knew and turned them into profit in the big parade that netted six touchdowns and a pair of field goals in the 60 minutes of jogging up and down the field."

The Colonels gained only one first down in the game against Detroit, this coming with a long pass completion at the end of the second period. They never crossed the midfield stripe during the entire course of the game.

== Schedule ==
Game	Date	Opponent	Result	Record	Venue	Attendance	Recap	Sources
1	October 3	at Canton Bulldogs	L 0–13	0–1	Lakeside Park	3,000	Recap	
2	October 17	at Detroit Panthers	L 0–47	0–2	Navin Field		Recap	
3	November 7	at Chicago Bears	L 0–34	0–3	Cubs Park	7,000	Recap	
4	November 14	at Green Bay Packers	L 0–14	0–4	City Stadium	1,300	Recap	

== Standings ==
NFL standings
	W	L	T	PCT	PF	PA	STK
Frankford Yellow Jackets	14	1	2	.933	236	49	T1
Chicago Bears	12	1	3	.923	216	63	L1
Pottsville Maroons	10	2	2	.833	155	29	T1
Kansas City Cowboys	8	3	0	.727	76	53	W7
Green Bay Packers	7	3	3	.700	151	61	T1
New York Giants	8	4	1	.667	151	61	W3
Los Angeles Buccaneers	6	3	1	.667	67	57	L1
Duluth Eskimos	6	5	3	.545	113	81	L1
Buffalo Rangers	4	4	2	.500	53	62	T1
Chicago Cardinals	5	6	1	.455	74	98	L1
Providence Steam Roller	5	7	1	.417	89	103	L1
Detroit Panthers	4	6	2	.400	107	60	L3
Hartford Blues	3	7	0	.300	57	99	L1
Brooklyn Lions	3	8	0	.273	60	150	L3
Milwaukee Badgers	2	7	0	.222	41	66	L5
Dayton Triangles	1	4	1	.200	15	82	L2
Akron Indians	1	4	3	.200	23	89	T1
Racine Tornadoes	1	4	0	.200	8	92	L4
Columbus Tigers	1	6	0	.143	26	93	L5
Canton Bulldogs	1	9	3	.100	46	161	L1
Hammond Pros	0	4	0	.000	3	56	L4
Louisville Colonels	0	4	0	.000	0	108	L4

Note: Tie games were not officially counted in the standings until 1972.

== Roster ==
Louisville Colonels 1926 roster
Dan Bernoske, G; Ed Berwick, C; Ray Bush, E; Harry Curzon, B; Jim Eiden, T; Bill Flannigan, T; Al Gansberg, E; Bill Glaver, B; Gene Golsen, FB; Tom Golsen, G; Vee Green, T; Glenn Greenwood, FB; Steve Hanson, E; Larry Jackson, C	Gar Leaf, T; Bill McCaw, G; John McDonald, T; Lou Metzger, FB; Omensky, G; Chuck Palmer, BB; Ed Robinson, B; Lenny Sachs, E; John Scanlon, TB; Walt Sechrist, G; Gerry Sherry, FB; George Slagle, G; Pete Stinchcomb, B; Pete Vainowski, G
