= Red Daum =

American football player

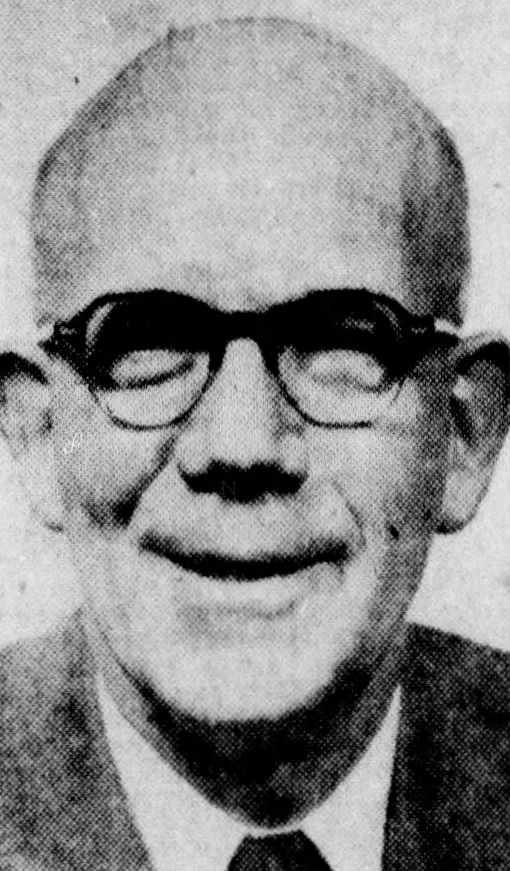

No. 6, 8, 7
- Position: End

Personal information
- Born: September 18, 1898; Akron, Ohio, U.S.
- Died: June 30, 1959 (aged 60); Akron, Ohio, U.S.

Career information
- High school: Central
- College: Akron (1918–1921)

Career history
- Akron Pros (1922–1926); Canton Bulldogs (1927)

Carl Vance Daum (September 18, 1898 – June 30, 1959), known professionally as Red Daum, was an American professional football end. He played for the Akron Pros of the National Football League (NFL).

== Life and career ==
Daum was born in Akron, Ohio. He played high school football at Central High School in Akron, Ohio, and was captain of the football team in 1916. He then enrolled at the University of Akron to play college football for the Akron Zips. He was a four-year varsity letterman from 1918 to 1921, and was captain of the basketball team from 1921 to 1922. He served in the United States Army.

In 1922, Daum joined the Akron Pros of the National Football League (NFL). He started thirty games for the team, and played in 37 games for five seasons. In 1926, he became a free agent, and in 1927, he joined the Canton Bulldogs. In 1928, he again became a free agent. After his football career ended, he worked as a salesman for Universal Motor.

== Death ==
Daum died on June 30, 1959, in Akron, Ohio, at the age of 60.
