= Al Crook =

American football player (1897–1958)

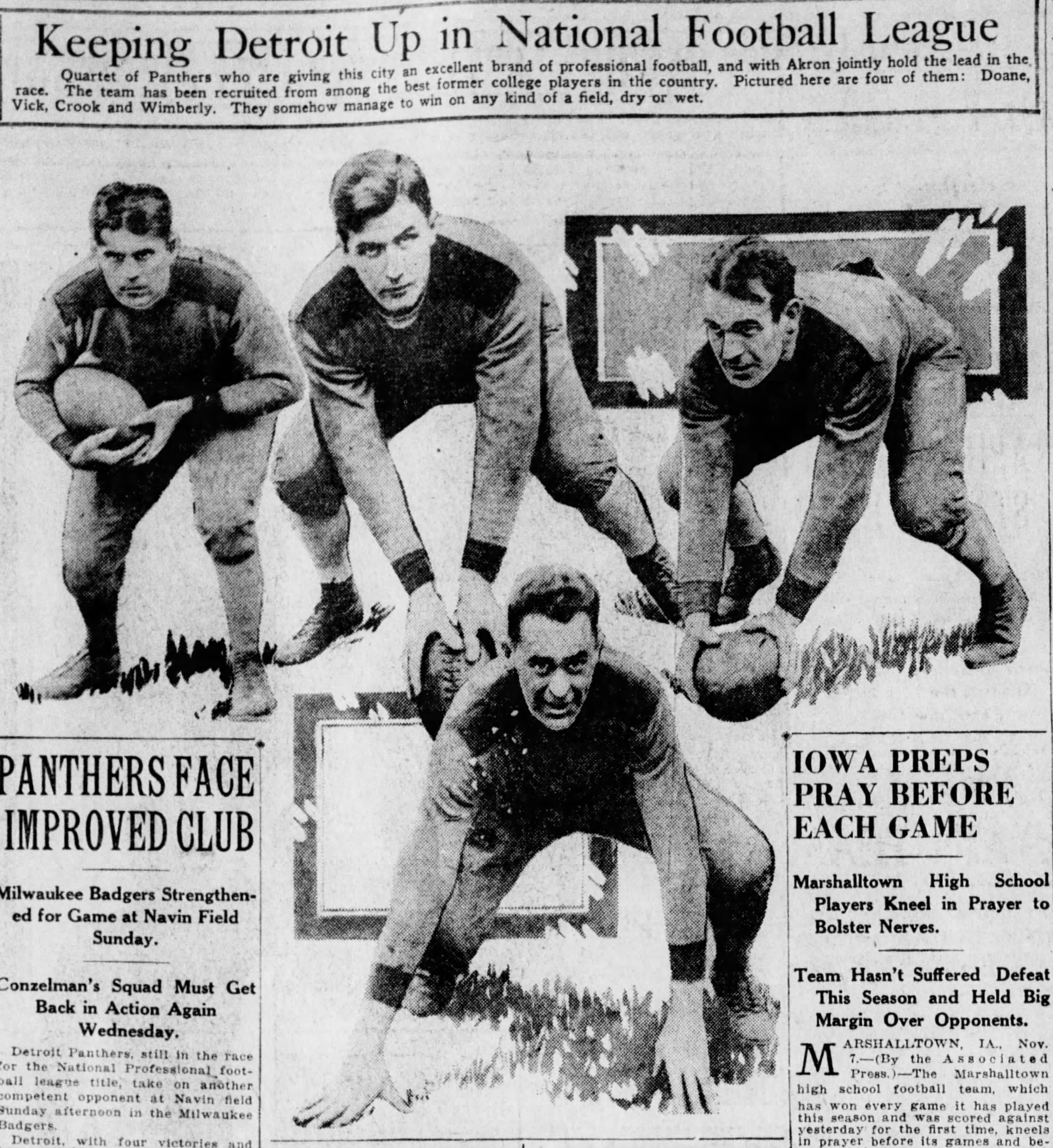

No. 7
- Positions: Center, guard, tackle

Personal information
- Born: November 20, 1897; Detroit, Michigan
- Died: February 17, 1958 (aged 60)
- Listed height: 5 ft 10 in (1.78 m)
- Listed weight: 190 lb (86 kg)

Career information
- College: Washington & Jefferson College

Career history
- Detroit Panthers (1925–1926)
- Stats at Pro Football Reference

Alfred John Crook (November 20, 1897 – February 17, 1958) was an American football player. He played professionally in the National Football League (NFL) for the Detroit Panthers from 1925 to 1926. Crook attended Washington & Jefferson College and was the starting center and defensive end for the Presidents in the 1922 Rose Bowl. His nickname "Monk" was given to him by his teammates at Washington & Jefferson.
