= 1926 Green Bay Packers season =

NFL team season

- Head coach: Curly Lambeau
- Home stadium: City Stadium

Results
- Record: 7–3–3
- League place: 5th NFL

The 1926 Green Bay Packers season was their eighth season overall and their sixth season in the National Football League. The team finished with a 7–3–3 record under player/coach Curly Lambeau earning them a fifth-place finish. The season marked the second year the Packers played at City Stadium.

== Schedule ==
| Game | Date | Opponent | Result | Record | Venue | Attendance | Recap | Sources |
|---|---|---|---|---|---|---|---|---|
| 1 | September 19 | Detroit Panthers | W 21–0 | 1–0 | City Stadium | 4,500 | Recap | |
| 2 | September 26 | Chicago Bears | T 6–6 | 1–0–1 | City Stadium | 7,000 | Recap | |
| 3 | October 3 | Duluth Eskimos | T 0–0 | 1–0–2 | City Stadium | 2,500 | Recap | |
| 4 | October 10 | Chicago Cardinals | L 7–13 | 1–1–2 | City Stadium | 5,000 | Recap | |
| 5 | October 17 | Milwaukee Badgers | W 7–0 | 2–1–2 | City Stadium | 3,000 | Recap | |
| 6 | October 24 | Racine Tornadoes | W 35–0 | 3–1–2 | City Stadium | | Recap | |
| 7 | October 31 | at Chicago Cardinals | W 3–0 | 4–1–2 | Normal Park | 2,500 | Recap | |
| 8 | November 7 | at Milwaukee Badgers | W 21–0 | 5–1–2 | Athletic Park | 4,300 | Recap | |
| 9 | November 14 | Louisville Colonels | W 14–0 | 6–1–2 | City Stadium | 1,300 | Recap | |
| 10 | November 21 | at Chicago Bears | L 13–19 | 6–2–2 | Cubs Park | 7,500 | Recap | |
| 11 | November 25 | at Frankford Yellow Jackets | L 14–20 | 6–3–2 | Frankford Stadium | 10,000 | Recap | |
| 12 | November 28 | at Detroit Panthers | W 7–0 | 7–3–2 | Navin Field | 1,000 | Recap | |
| 13 | December 19 | at Chicago Bears | T 3–3 | 7–3–3 | Soldier Field | 10,000 | Recap | |
Note: Thanksgiving: November 25.

== Standings ==
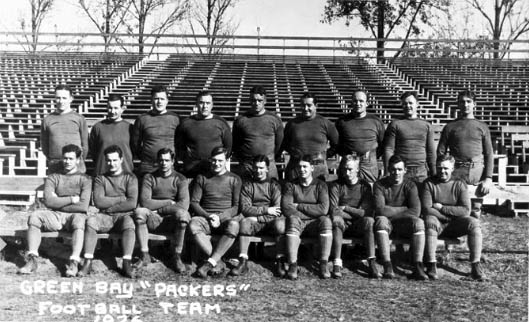
The 1926 Packers team

NFL standings
| | W | L | T | PCT | PF | PA | STK |
|---|---|---|---|---|---|---|---|
| Frankford Yellow Jackets | 14 | 1 | 2 | .933 | 236 | 49 | T1 |
| Chicago Bears | 12 | 1 | 3 | .923 | 216 | 63 | L1 |
| Pottsville Maroons | 10 | 2 | 2 | .833 | 155 | 29 | T1 |
| Kansas City Cowboys | 8 | 3 | 0 | .727 | 76 | 53 | W7 |
| Green Bay Packers | 7 | 3 | 3 | .700 | 151 | 61 | T1 |
| New York Giants | 8 | 4 | 1 | .667 | 151 | 61 | W3 |
| Los Angeles Buccaneers | 6 | 3 | 1 | .667 | 67 | 57 | L1 |
| Duluth Eskimos | 6 | 5 | 3 | .545 | 113 | 81 | L1 |
| Buffalo Rangers | 4 | 4 | 2 | .500 | 53 | 62 | T1 |
| Chicago Cardinals | 5 | 6 | 1 | .455 | 74 | 98 | L1 |
| Providence Steam Roller | 5 | 7 | 1 | .417 | 89 | 103 | L1 |
| Detroit Panthers | 4 | 6 | 2 | .400 | 107 | 60 | L3 |
| Hartford Blues | 3 | 7 | 0 | .300 | 57 | 99 | L1 |
| Brooklyn Lions | 3 | 8 | 0 | .273 | 60 | 150 | L3 |
| Milwaukee Badgers | 2 | 7 | 0 | .222 | 41 | 66 | L5 |
| Dayton Triangles | 1 | 4 | 1 | .200 | 15 | 82 | L2 |
| Akron Indians | 1 | 4 | 3 | .200 | 23 | 89 | T1 |
| Racine Tornadoes | 1 | 4 | 0 | .200 | 8 | 92 | L4 |
| Columbus Tigers | 1 | 6 | 0 | .143 | 26 | 93 | L5 |
| Canton Bulldogs | 1 | 9 | 3 | .100 | 46 | 161 | L1 |
| Hammond Pros | 0 | 4 | 0 | .000 | 3 | 56 | L4 |
| Louisville Colonels | 0 | 4 | 0 | .000 | 0 | 108 | L4 |

Note: Tie games were not officially counted in the standings until 1972.
