= 1926 Canton Bulldogs season =

National Football League team season

- Head coach: Pete Henry and Harry Robb

Results
- Record: 1–9–3
- League place: 20th NFL

The 1926 Canton Bulldogs season was their sixth and final season in the league. The team failed to improve on their previous output of 4–4, winning only one game. They finished twentieth in the league.

== Schedule ==
Game	Date	Opponent	Result	Record	Venue	Recap
1	September 26	Columbus Tigers	L 2–14	0–1	Lakeside Park	Recap
2	October 3	Louisville Colonels	W 13–0	1–1	Lakeside Park	Recap
3	October 10	at Akron Indians	T 0–0	1–1–1	General Field	Recap
4	October 17	Los Angeles Buccaneers	L 13–16	1–2–1	Lakeside Park	Recap
5	October 23	at Frankford Yellow Jackets	L 0–17	1–3–1	Lakeside Park	Recap
6	October 31	at Detroit Panthers	L 0–6	1–4–1	Briggs Stadium	Recap
7	November 2	at New York Giants	T 7–7	1–4–2	Polo Grounds	Recap
8	November 7	at Hartford Blues	L 7–16	1–5–2	East Hartford Velodrome	Recap
9	November 11	at Providence Steam Roller	L 2–21	1–6–2	Cycledrome	Recap
10	November 14	at Brooklyn Lions	L 0–19	1–7–2	Ebbets Field	Recap
11	November 21	Duluth Eskimos	L 2–10	1–8–2	Lakeside Park	Recap
12	November 25	Akron Indians	T 0–0	1–8–3	Lakeside Park	Recap
13	November 28	at Chicago Bears	L 0–35	1–9–3	Cubs Park	Recap

== Standings ==
NFL standings
	W	L	T	PCT	PF	PA	STK
Frankford Yellow Jackets	14	1	2	.933	236	49	T1
Chicago Bears	12	1	3	.923	216	63	L1
Pottsville Maroons	10	2	2	.833	155	29	T1
Kansas City Cowboys	8	3	0	.727	76	53	W7
Green Bay Packers	7	3	3	.700	151	61	T1
New York Giants	8	4	1	.667	151	61	W3
Los Angeles Buccaneers	6	3	1	.667	67	57	L1
Duluth Eskimos	6	5	3	.545	113	81	L1
Buffalo Rangers	4	4	2	.500	53	62	T1
Chicago Cardinals	5	6	1	.455	74	98	L1
Providence Steam Roller	5	7	1	.417	89	103	L1
Detroit Panthers	4	6	2	.400	107	60	L3
Hartford Blues	3	7	0	.300	57	99	L1
Brooklyn Lions	3	8	0	.273	60	150	L3
Milwaukee Badgers	2	7	0	.222	41	66	L5
Dayton Triangles	1	4	1	.200	15	82	L2
Akron Indians	1	4	3	.200	23	89	T1
Racine Tornadoes	1	4	0	.200	8	92	L4
Columbus Tigers	1	6	0	.143	26	93	L5
Canton Bulldogs	1	9	3	.100	46	161	L1
Hammond Pros	0	4	0	.000	3	56	L4
Louisville Colonels	0	4	0	.000	0	108	L4

Note: Tie games were not officially counted in the standings until 1972.
