= George Rohleder =

American football player (1898–1958)

Profile
- Positions: Guard, tackle, fullback

Personal information
- Born: October 3, 1898; Bryan, Ohio, U.S.
- Died: February 17, 1958 (aged 59)
- Listed height: 5 ft 11 in (1.80 m)
- Listed weight: 213 lb (97 kg)

Career information
- High school: Bryan (OH)
- College: Wittenberg

Career history
- Columbus Tigers (1925); Akron Indians (1926)
- Stats at Pro Football Reference

George J. Rohleder (October 3, 1898 – February 17, 1958) was an American football player.

He played college football for Wittenberg from 1921 to 1924. He was selected a first-team player on the 1924 All-Ohio Conference football team.

He later played professional football at the guard, tackle, and halfback positions in the National Football League (NFL) for the Columbus Tigers in 1925, and Akron Indians in 1926. He appeared in 15 NFL games, eight as a starter.

After his playing career ended, he coached the Atlantic City Tornadoes team. In 1931, he was one of the founders and financial backers of the Camden All-America Football Club.
