= 1926 NFL season =

American football season

Regular season
- Duration: September 19 – December 19, 1926
- Champions: Frankford Yellow Jackets

NFL teams

The 1926 NFL season was the seventh regular season of the National Football League (NFL). It was a year in which a record 22 teams participated, a number not equaled again until after the 1970 NFL-AFL merger.

In the spring of 1927, a league meeting was held in Cleveland in an attempt to solidify the league by relegating smaller and financially shaky teams out of the league. A total of just 12 teams would remain for the 1927 season.

== History ==
=== Background ===
At their February 6–7 meeting, NFL owners agreed to declare all players ineligible for the league until after their college classes had graduated, effectively ending the ability of professional teams to poach players from collegiate squads.

The league also established roster limits, specifying that teams must carry a minimum of 15 players and a maximum of 18.

=== Growth ===
The National Football League grew to 22 teams in 1926, with newcomers including the Brooklyn Lions, Hartford Blues, Los Angeles Buccaneers, and the Louisville Colonels, with the Racine Tornadoes re-entering.

Offsetting the torrent of first-time teams, the Cleveland Bulldogs sat out the season, the Rock Island Independents defected to the upstart American Football League, and the Rochester Jeffersons suspended operations for the final time (eventually folding in early 1928).

Adding to the confusion, in 1926 the Akron Pros re-branded as the Akron Indians, the Duluth Kelleys as the Duluth Eskimos, and the Buffalo Bison as the Buffalo Rangers.

The Buccaneers, Eskimos, Colonels and Rangers were "showcase teams," the first efforts for the league to reach beyond the northeast and midwest. The Buccaneers, a response to the AFL's Los Angeles Wildcats, represented the state of California; the Eskimos the far northern plains, while the Colonels represented the Southern United States and the Rangers represented the state of Texas and other areas of the Southwestern United States. These four teams (except the Rangers) all played primarily as traveling teams. Three of the four teams only lasted one season; the Buccaneers and Colonels both folded while the Rangers reverted to their previous status as the Bison, with only the Eskimos returning for 1927.

In mid-November, Brooklyn merged with the AFL's Brooklyn Horsemen and stayed in the NFL, playing one more game as the Lions before changing its name to the Brooklyn Horsemen for the last three games — all shutout losses.

=== Discipline ===
At the league's July scheduling meeting, the Milwaukee Badgers were fined $500 for having fielded four high school players the previous October in a game against the Chicago Cardinals. In addition, the league delivered a death penalty to the team's owner, A.L. McGurk, who was ordered to sell the franchise within 90 days. The Badgers would never play in the NFL again.

=== Rules changes ===
The NFL continued to follow the football rules published by the National Collegiate Athletic Association, as amended by its Rules Committee, during the 1926 season.

The most important rules change in 1926 was an attempt to change the risk-reward ratio of the forward pass, specifying that the second and third incomplete passes during any series of downs would each result in a five-yard penalty against the offense. Another rule attempted to eliminate the stalling tactic of a team with a lead incurring intentional safeties during the waning minutes of a game by forcing the ball to be kicked away from the 20 yard line, with only an onside kick available as a means of the offensive team retaining possession.

== Teams ==
The league had a record 22 teams for the 1926 season.

| First season in NFL * | Rejoined the NFL † | Last active season ^ |

| Team | Head coach(es) | Stadium |
|---|---|---|
| Akron Indians ^ | Al Nesser (2 games) and Frank Nied (6 games) | Akron League Park |
| Brooklyn Lions *^ | Punk Berryman | Ebbets Field |
| Buffalo Rangers | Jim Kendrick | Bison Stadium |
| Canton Bulldogs ^ | Pete Henry and Harry Robb (10 games) | League Field |
| Chicago Bears | George Halas | Cubs Park |
| Chicago Cardinals | Norman Barry | Normal Park |
| Columbus Tigers ^ | Jack Heldt | West Side Athletic Club |
| Dayton Triangles | Carl Storck | Triangle Park |
| Detroit Panthers ^ | Jimmy Conzelman | Navin Field |
| Duluth Eskimos | Dewey Scanlon | Duluth Athletic Park |
| Frankford Yellow Jackets | Guy Chamberlin | Frankford Stadium |
| Green Bay Packers | Curly Lambeau | City Stadium |
| Hammond Pros ^ | Doc Young | Traveling team |
| Hartford Blues *^ | Jack Keogh | East Hartford Velodrome |
| Kansas City Cowboys ^ | Roy Andrews | Muehlebach Field |
| Los Angeles Buccaneers *^ | Tut Imlay and Brick Muller | Traveling team |
| Louisville Colonels *^ | Lenny Sachs | Traveling team |
| Milwaukee Badgers ^ | Johnny Bryan | Milwaukee Athletic Park |
| New York Giants | Doc Alexander | Polo Grounds |
| Pottsville Maroons | Dick Rauch | Minersville Park |
| Providence Steam Roller | Jim Laird | Cycledrome |
| Racine Tornadoes †^ | Shorty Barr (3 games) and Wally McIlwain (2 games) | Horlick Field |

== Standings ==
NFL standings
| | W | L | T | PCT | PF | PA | STK |
|---|---|---|---|---|---|---|---|
| Frankford Yellow Jackets | 14 | 1 | 2 | .933 | 236 | 49 | T1 |
| Chicago Bears | 12 | 1 | 3 | .923 | 216 | 63 | L1 |
| Pottsville Maroons | 10 | 2 | 2 | .833 | 155 | 29 | T1 |
| Kansas City Cowboys | 8 | 3 | 0 | .727 | 76 | 53 | W7 |
| Green Bay Packers | 7 | 3 | 3 | .700 | 151 | 61 | T1 |
| New York Giants | 8 | 4 | 1 | .667 | 151 | 61 | W3 |
| Los Angeles Buccaneers | 6 | 3 | 1 | .667 | 67 | 57 | L1 |
| Duluth Eskimos | 6 | 5 | 3 | .545 | 113 | 81 | L1 |
| Buffalo Rangers | 4 | 4 | 2 | .500 | 53 | 62 | T1 |
| Chicago Cardinals | 5 | 6 | 1 | .455 | 74 | 98 | L1 |
| Providence Steam Roller | 5 | 7 | 1 | .417 | 89 | 103 | L1 |
| Detroit Panthers | 4 | 6 | 2 | .400 | 107 | 60 | L3 |
| Hartford Blues | 3 | 7 | 0 | .300 | 57 | 99 | L1 |
| Brooklyn Lions | 3 | 8 | 0 | .273 | 60 | 150 | L3 |
| Milwaukee Badgers | 2 | 7 | 0 | .222 | 41 | 66 | L5 |
| Dayton Triangles | 1 | 4 | 1 | .200 | 15 | 82 | L2 |
| Akron Indians | 1 | 4 | 3 | .200 | 23 | 89 | T1 |
| Racine Tornadoes | 1 | 4 | 0 | .200 | 8 | 92 | L4 |
| Columbus Tigers | 1 | 6 | 0 | .143 | 26 | 93 | L5 |
| Canton Bulldogs | 1 | 9 | 3 | .100 | 46 | 161 | L1 |
| Hammond Pros | 0 | 4 | 0 | .000 | 3 | 56 | L4 |
| Louisville Colonels | 0 | 4 | 0 | .000 | 0 | 108 | L4 |

Note: Tie games were not officially counted in the standings until 1972.

== Championship ==
The Frankford Yellow Jackets were named the NFL champions after finishing the season with the best record. Their 14 victories were the most in an NFL season to that point, a record that would not be bested until the 1968 Baltimore Colts won 15.

After the season, the Philadelphia Inquirer lobbied for a World Series-style game between the Yellow Jackets and the AFL's champions Philadelphia Quakers, with the Quakers' owner challenging the Yellow Jackets, but ultimately the NFL denied permission to this game to be held.

== Post-season ==
In January 1927, an owners' meeting was held in New York City at which tentative plans were made to reorganize the NFL into two classes, "A" and "B", with weaker teams demoted to the second division. A follow-up meeting was held on April 23 and 24 in Cleveland's Statler Hotel to formalize these changes.

Although the splitting of the league into tiers was initially envisioned, the decision was made to eliminate small and financially struggling teams from the league, with 10 of the league's 22 clubs thereby either relegated to independent semi-pro status or nudged into dissolution.

== See also ==
- 1926 American Football League season
