= Hal Griggs (American football) =

American football player (1900–1987)

Profile
- Position: Back

Personal information
- Born: November 27, 1900; Toronto, Ontario, Canada
- Died: December 29, 1987 (aged 87)
- Listed height: 5 ft 10 in (1.78 m)
- Listed weight: 170 lb (77 kg)

Career information
- College: Butler

Career history
- Akron Indians (1926)

Career statistics
- Games played: 5
- Games started: 2
- Touchdowns: 2
- Stats at Pro Football Reference

Haldane Alfred Griggs (November 27, 1900 – December 29, 1987) was a National Football League running back. He played five games for the Akron Indians. He was born in Toronto, Ontario, Canada.
