= Norman Barry =

American judge, politician, and football coach (1897–1988)

Profile
- Positions: Quarterback, halfback

Personal information
- Born: December 25, 1897; Chicago, Illinois, U.S.
- Died: October 13, 1988 (aged 90); Chicago, Illinois, U.S.

Career information
- College: Notre Dame

Career history

Playing
- 1921: Chicago Cardinals
- 1921: Green Bay Packers
- 1922: Milwaukee Badgers

Coaching
- 1925–1926: Chicago Cardinals

Awards and highlights
- NFL champion (1925)
- Coaching profile at Pro Football Reference
- Stats at Pro Football Reference

Norman Christopher Barry (December 25, 1897 – October 13, 1988) was an American judge, politician, and football coach.

== Political and judicial career ==
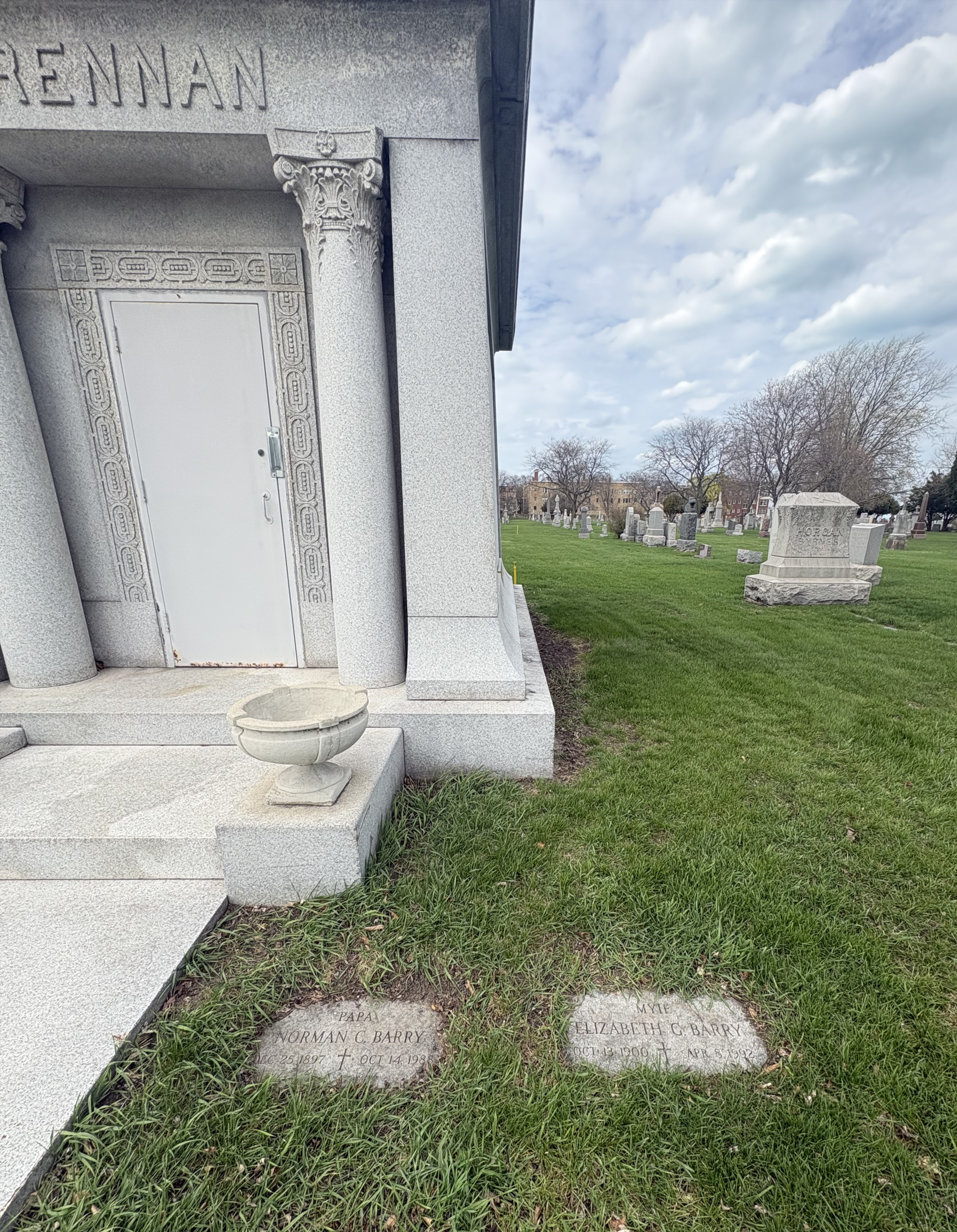
Barry's grave at Calvary Cemetery

Barry was born in Chicago, Illinois. He went to the Chicago public schools and then went to the Notre Dame preparatory school for thirteen years, from grade school to law school. He then received his law degree from the Notre Dame Law School and was admitted to the Illinois bar in 1928. Barry was involved with the Democratic Party in Chicago. Barry served in the Illinois Senate from 1943 until 1953. He then served as an Illinois circuit court judge for Cook County, Illinois from 1953 until his retirement in 1978. He then resumed practicing law in Chicago. He died on October 13, 1988, at Northwestern Memorial Hospital after suffering a heart attack while at his law office. He was buried at Calvary Cemetery in Evanston.

== Football career ==
He was the head coach for the National Football League's Chicago Cardinals from 1925 to 1926. With Norman Barry as head coach the Cardinals outdistanced a field of 20 teams to win their first NFL championship in 1925 by virtue of the league's best record. In two seasons, he compiled a record of 16–8–2. Prior to his coaching career, he played in the early NFL for the Cardinals, Green Bay Packers and Milwaukee Badgers. Barry was George Gipp's teammate at the University of Notre Dame.
