= Shorty Barr =

American football player (1897–1957)

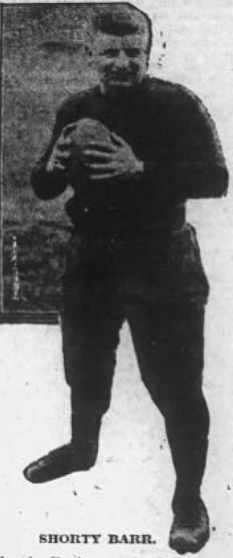

Profile
- Position: Quarterback

Personal information
- Born: November 30, 1897; Milwaukee, Wisconsin, U.S.
- Died: April 26, 1957 (aged 59)
- Listed height: 5 ft 8 in (1.73 m)
- Listed weight: 195 lb (88 kg)

Career information
- College: Wisconsin (1919–1922)

Career history

Playing
- 1923–1924: Racine Legion
- 1925: Milwaukee Badgers
- 1926: Racine Tornadoes

Coaching
- 1926: Racine Tornadoes
- Coaching profile at Pro Football Reference

Wallace Andre "Shorty" Barr (November 30, 1897 – April 26, 1957) was an American professional football player in the National Football League (NFL) for the Racine Legion and the Milwaukee Badgers. He was also a player-coach for the NFL's renamed Racine Tornadoes in 1926.

Barr played college football for the Wisconsin Badgers in 1922. His ability to participate had been in question before the season, but he managed to qualify by attending summer school at the University of Michigan and passing examinations prior to the September start of football season.

On November 25, 1923, as the quarterback for the Legion, Barr was tackled twice in the end zone during a game against the Chicago Cardinals causing the Cards to register a pair of safeties in a 10–4 loss to the Legion — the only four-point game in NFL history.

In 1924 Barr punted 40 times for Racine and averaged 65 yards per punt.
