= Wally McIlwain =

American football player and coach (1903–1963)

Profile
- Positions: Wingback, halfback

Personal information
- Born: January 20, 1903; Chicago, Illinois, U.S.
- Died: June 30, 1963 (aged 60); Evanston, Illinois, U.S.
- Listed height: 5 ft 9 in (1.75 m)
- Listed weight: 173 lb (78 kg)

Career information
- College: Illinois

Career history

Playing
- 1926: Racine Tornadoes

Coaching
- 1926: Racine Tornadoes

Awards and highlights
- National champion (1923)
- Coaching profile at Pro Football Reference

Wallace Wesley McIlwain (January 20, 1903 – June 30, 1963) was an American football player and coach. He played professionally in the National Football League (NFL) for the Racine Tornadoes. In 1926, he was a player-coach for the Tornadoes. Prior to his professional career, McIlwain played college football at the University of Illinois, alongside Red Grange.
