= Racine Legion =

Defunct American football team

Racine Legion/Tornadoes
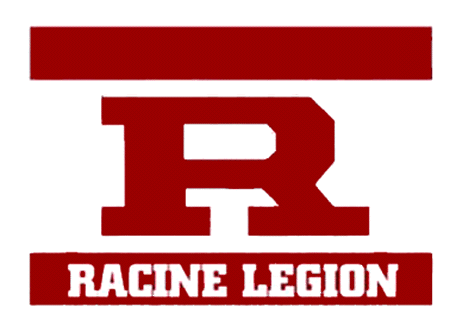
Logo

General information
- Founded: 1915
- Folded: 1926
- Stadium: Horlick Field
- Headquartered: Racine, Wisconsin, United States
- Colors: Crimson, white

Personnel
- Owners: William Horlick (1919–1924); Racine Exchange Club (1925–1926)
- General manager: Babe Ruetz
- Head coach: Babe Ruetz (1922–1924); Shorty Barr & Wally McIlwain (1926)

Nickname

Team history
- Racine Regulars (1915); Racine Battery C (1916–1918); Horlick-Racine Legion (1919–1922); Racine Legion (1922–1925); Racine Tornadoes (1926)

League / conference affiliations
- Independent (1915–1922); National Football League (1922–1924, 1926)

The Racine Legion were a professional American football team based in Racine, Wisconsin, of the National Football League from 1922 to 1924. Its official name was the Horlick-Racine Legion. The team then operated as the Racine Tornadoes in 1926.

== History ==
In 1915, the Racine Regulars formed Wisconsin's first important semi-professional team. They primarily played against teams from Illinois and Indiana. The team became known as the Racine Battery C in 1916 after many of the players joined the First Wisconsin Reserve Artillery Battery C.

Because of World War I and the Spanish flu pandemic of 1918 the team took a break. It was reorganized in 1919 with sponsorship from the local American Legion post and William Horlick, president of his family's malted milk company. The reorganized team was known as the Horlick-Racine Legion.

In 1922, the American Professional Football Association changed its name to the National Football League. Racine, now known simply as the Racine Legion, although its official name remained the Horlick-Racine Legion was one of four new teams admitted to membership that season.

Led by the fullback-kicker Hank Gillo, who led the league in scoring with 52 points, Racine finished sixth in the 18-team league with a 6–4–1 record. Despite two more respectable seasons, the team failed because of finances. In 1925, the franchise was held over by the NFL, but they did not field a team that season.

Milton "Mitt" Romney, team captain at the University of Chicago in 1922, became a quarterback for the Racine Legion before later joining the Chicago Bears. He was a cousin of Michigan Governor George W. Romney, and his nickname inspired that of George Romney's son, 2012 U.S. presidential candidate Mitt Romney.

Facing the threat of Red Grange's American Football League in 1926, the NFL was eager to get as many teams and players as possible into the fold to keep them away from the AFL. The Racine franchise was reactivated. The team, now called the Tornadoes, had a few of the same players as the Legion but many stars went to other teams in 1925. After winning their first game, the Tornadoes lost four in a row and disbanded in late October because of struggling finances.

== Season-by-season ==
	Year	W	L	T	Finish	Coach
Legion	1922	6	4	1	6th	Babe Ruetz
Legion	1923	4	4	2	9th	Babe Ruetz
Legion	1924	4	3	3	7th	Babe Ruetz
Legion	1925	Suspended Operations				
Tornadoes	1926	1	4	0	16th	Shorty Barr, Wally McIlwain

== Trivia ==
The Racine Legion have the distinction of winning the only NFL game where one team scored exactly 4 points. On November 25, 1923, the Legion beat the Chicago Cardinals by a score of 10–4. Further, the Cardinals franchise had used Racine as its geographic name until 1922, referring to Racine Ave. on which the team's home field was located.

== See also ==
- Category:Racine Legion players
