= Minersville Park =

Defunct American football stadium in Pennsylvania

Coordinates: 40.681778°N 76.254856°W

- Interactive map of Minersville Park
- Location: Minersville, Pennsylvania
- Owner: Minersville, Pennsylvania
- Operator: Pottsville Maroons
- Capacity: 5,000 (American football)
- Surface: Grass

Tenants
- Pottsville Eleven (Ind.) (1920–23); Pottsville Maroons (AL) (1924); Pottsville Maroons (NFL) (1925–1928)

Minersville Park was an American football stadium in Minersville, Pennsylvania, near Pottsville.

== History and notable features ==
This field was located where the current Kings Village Plaza is located on Route 901 in Minersville. It is most notable as the home field for the Pottsville Maroons football team from 1920 to 1928, including during their run in the National Football League from 1925 to 1928.

It also served as a high school stadium, and had a capacity of only 5,000, which was relatively low for other NFL stadiums at the time.

When the Maroons moved to Boston as the 1929 (only) Bulldogs, they played two games in greater Pottsville: October 27 at Minersville Park (v. Buffalo Bisons) and October 29 at Mitchell Field (v. Newark Tornadoes).
