= List of NFL players who have posted a perfect passer rating =

In the National Football League (NFL), the highest official passer rating that a player can achieve is 158.3, which is called a "perfect passer rating." To qualify, during a single game a player must attempt at least 10 passes, have no interceptions, have a minimum completion percentage of 77.5%, have a minimum of 11.875% of their passes score touchdowns, and have a minimum of 12.5 yards on average per attempt. To qualify for this list, a player must have attempted at least ten passes (prior to 1976); 12 passes (1976–1977); or 14 passes (1978–present) in the game in question. The passer rating was developed in 1971.

As of the 2025 season, there have been 82 instances of a perfect passer rating in the regular season among 67 players. Eight players have achieved the feat more than once: Peyton Manning and Lamar Jackson four times each; Tom Brady, Ben Roethlisberger, and Kurt Warner three times each; and Craig Morton, Ken O'Brien, and Jared Goff twice each.

Four players have posted a perfect passer rating in a postseason game: Terry Bradshaw, Dave Krieg, Peyton Manning, and Don Meredith. Krieg and Manning are the only players to have a perfect passer rating during the regular season and the postseason. No player has posted multiple perfect passer ratings in the postseason.

Roethlisberger (2007) and Jackson (2019) are the only quarterbacks with multiple perfect ratings in a single regular season. Three teams have had two different quarterbacks achieve a perfect rating in the same season: The 1954 Cleveland Browns with Otto Graham and George Ratterman, the 1973 Atlanta Falcons with Dick Shiner and Bob Lee, and the 1989 San Francisco 49ers with Steve Young and Joe Montana. Peyton Manning had a perfect rating in the 2003 regular season, followed by one in the 2003 postseason.

Drew Bledsoe, Robert Griffin III, and Marcus Mariota are the only players to achieve a perfect passer rating in their rookie seasons, with Mariota being the only player to post one in his NFL debut.

Five of these performances were in a losing cause, though Chad Pennington was the only quarterback to play from start to finish and record both a loss and a perfect rating. 12 players have had a game in which they earned a perfect 158.3 passer rating and another game in which they earned a 0.0, the lowest possible passer rating, during their career. (Note: The players who have accomplished this: Otto Graham, George Ratterman, Milt Plum, Len Dawson, Joe Namath, Daryle Lamonica, Bob Lee, James Harris, Dan Fouts, Vince Evans, Craig Morton, and Peyton Manning.) Milt Plum had a perfect rating and a zero rating in the same season with the Browns (1958).

== List ==
The following number of pass attempts are needed to qualify for this list:
* Prior to 1976: 10
* 1976–1977: 12
* 1978–present: 14

=== Regular season ===
Overview of NFL quarterbacks with a perfect passer rating
#	Player	Date	Team	Opponent	Result	Comp.	Att.	Yards	TDs
1	Jack Ernst	November 11, 1925	Pottsville Maroons	Frankford Yellow Jackets	W 49–0	12	14	227	3
2	Red Dunn	December 10, 1925	Chicago Cardinals	Milwaukee Badgers	W 59–0	11	12	300	4
3	Benny Friedman	October 19, 1930	New York Giants	Frankford Yellow Jackets	W 53–0	18	23	310	5
4	Benny Friedman	December 6, 1931	New York Giants	Brooklyn Dodgers	W 19–6	9	11	228	2
5	Benny Friedman	October 15, 1933	Brooklyn Dodgers	Cincinnati Reds	W 27–0	9	10	165	3
6	Gene Ronzani	October 22, 1944	Chicago Bears	Detroit Lions	T 21–21	10	12	200	3
7	Otto Graham	September 12, 1947	Cleveland Browns	Brooklyn Dodgers	W 55–7	9	11	146	2
8	Otto Graham(2)	November 2, 1947	Cleveland Browns	Buffalo Bills	W 28–7	13	16	256	3
9	Ray Mallouf	October 17, 1948	Chicago Cardinals	New York Giants	W 63–35	14	18	252	4
10	Sammy Baugh	October 16, 1949	Washington Redskins	New York Bulldogs	W 38–14	16	20	254	4
11	Otto Graham(3)	October 10, 1954	Cleveland Browns	Chicago Cardinals	W 31–7	14	18	266	3
12	George Ratterman	November 7, 1954	Cleveland Browns	Washington Redskins	W 62–3	10	11	208	3
13	Milt Plum	October 5, 1958	Cleveland Browns	Pittsburgh Steelers	W 45–12	13	14	197	2
14	M.C. Reynolds	December 6, 1959	Chicago Cardinals	Detroit Lions	L 45–21	8	10	170	2
15	Len Dawson	September 7, 1963	Kansas City Chiefs	Denver Broncos	W 59–7	12	15	278	4
16	Y.A. Tittle	November 10, 1963	New York Giants	Philadelphia Eagles	W 42–14	16	20	261	3
17	Frank Ryan	December 12, 1964	Cleveland Browns	New York Giants	W 52–20	12	13	202	5
18	Sonny Jurgensen	October 24, 1965	Washington Redskins	St. Louis Cardinals	W 24–20	12	14	195	3
19	Joe Namath	October 22, 1967	New York Jets	Miami Dolphins	W 33–14	13	15	199	2
20	Johnny Unitas	November 12, 1967	Baltimore Colts	Atlanta Falcons	W 49–7	17	20	370	4
21	Craig Morton	October 5, 1969	Dallas Cowboys	Philadelphia Eagles	W 38–7	14	18	261	3
22	Fran Tarkenton	October 25, 1970	New York Giants	St. Louis Cardinals	W 35–17	15	18	280	5
23	Daryle Lamonica	September 17, 1972	Oakland Raiders	Pittsburgh Steelers	L 34–28	8	10	172	2
24	Dick Shiner	September 16, 1973	Atlanta Falcons	New Orleans Saints	W 62–7	13	15	227	3
25	Bob Lee	October 14, 1973	Atlanta Falcons	Chicago Bears	W 46–6	11	13	181	2
26	James Harris	October 20, 1974	Los Angeles Rams	San Francisco 49ers	W 37–14	12	15	276	3
27	Ken Anderson	November 3, 1974	Cincinnati Bengals	Baltimore Colts	W 24–14	17	21	297	3
28	Jim Hart	November 23, 1975	St. Louis Cardinals	New York Jets	W 37–6	11	13	242	2
29	Dan Fouts	September 26, 1976	San Diego Chargers	St. Louis Cardinals	W 43–24	15	18	259	4
30	Steve Grogan	October 29, 1978	New England Patriots	New York Jets	W 55–21	15	19	281	4
31	Brian Sipe	October 29, 1978	Cleveland Browns	Buffalo Bills	W 41–20	12	15	217	3
32	Vince Evans	December 7, 1980	Chicago Bears	Green Bay Packers	W 61–7	18	22	316	3
33	Craig Morton (2)	September 27, 1981	Denver Broncos	San Diego Chargers	W 42–24	17	18	308	4
34	Ken O'Brien	November 2, 1986	New York Jets	Seattle Seahawks	W 38–7	26	32	431	4
35	Joe Montana	November 12, 1989	San Francisco 49ers	Atlanta Falcons	W 45–3	16	19	270	3
36	Bobby Hebert	September 12, 1993	Atlanta Falcons	New Orleans Saints	L 34–31	14	18	243	3
37	Craig Erickson	September 11, 1994	Tampa Bay Buccaneers	Indianapolis Colts	W 24–10	19	24	313	3
38	Dave Krieg	November 24, 1994	Detroit Lions	Buffalo Bills	W 35–21	20	25	351	3
39	Chris Chandler	September 25, 1995	Houston Oilers	Cincinnati Bengals	W 38–28	23	26	352	4
40	Jeff Blake	October 19, 1995	Cincinnati Bengals	Pittsburgh Steelers	W 27–9	18	22	275	3
41	Kurt Warner	October 3, 1999	St. Louis Rams	Cincinnati Bengals	W 38–10	17	21	310	3
42	Kurt Warner (2)	October 1, 2000	St. Louis Rams	San Diego Chargers	W 57–31	24	30	390	4
43	Peyton Manning	October 22, 2000	Indianapolis Colts	New England Patriots	W 30–23	16	20	268	3
44	Doug Flutie	December 24, 2000	Buffalo Bills	Seattle Seahawks	W 42–23	20	25	366	3
45	Peyton Manning (2)	November 10, 2002	Indianapolis Colts	Philadelphia Eagles	W 35–13	18	23	319	3
46	Kerry Collins	December 22, 2002	New York Giants	Indianapolis Colts	W 44–27	23	29	366	4
47	Peyton Manning (3)	September 28, 2003	Indianapolis Colts	New Orleans Saints	W 55–21	20	25	314	6
48	Chad Pennington	November 16, 2003	New York Jets	Indianapolis Colts	L 38–31	11	14	219	3
49	Trent Green	December 14, 2003	Kansas City Chiefs	Detroit Lions	W 45–17	20	25	341	3
50	Donovan McNabb	September 23, 2007	Philadelphia Eagles	Detroit Lions	W 56–21	21	26	381	4
51	Tom Brady	October 21, 2007	New England Patriots	Miami Dolphins	W 49–28	21	25	354	6
52	Ben Roethlisberger	November 5, 2007	Pittsburgh Steelers	Baltimore Ravens	W 38–7	13	16	209	5
53	Ben Roethlisberger (2)	December 20, 2007	Pittsburgh Steelers	St. Louis Rams	W 41–24	16	20	261	3
54	Kurt Warner (3)	September 14, 2008	Arizona Cardinals	Miami Dolphins	W 31–10	19	24	361	3
55	Drew Brees	November 30, 2009	New Orleans Saints	New England Patriots	W 38–17	18	23	371	5
56	Tom Brady (2)	November 25, 2010	New England Patriots	Detroit Lions	W 45–24	21	27	341	4
57	Robert Griffin III	November 18, 2012	Washington Redskins	Philadelphia Eagles	W 31–6	14	15	200	4
58	Nick Foles	November 3, 2013	Philadelphia Eagles	Oakland Raiders	W 49–20	22	28	406	7
59	Alex Smith	December 15, 2013	Kansas City Chiefs	Oakland Raiders	W 56–31	17	20	287	5
60	Geno Smith	December 28, 2014	New York Jets	Miami Dolphins	W 37–24	20	25	358	3
61	Marcus Mariota	September 13, 2015	Tennessee Titans	Tampa Bay Buccaneers	W 42–14	13	16	209	4
62	Ryan Tannehill	October 25, 2015	Miami Dolphins	Houston Texans	W 44–26	18	19	282	4
63	Kirk Cousins	November 15, 2015	Washington Redskins	New Orleans Saints	W 47–14	20	25	324	4
64	Jared Goff	September 27, 2018	Los Angeles Rams	Minnesota Vikings	W 38–31	26	33	465	5
65	Russell Wilson	October 28, 2018	Seattle Seahawks	Detroit Lions	W 28–14	14	17	248	3
66	Ben Roethlisberger (3)	November 8, 2018	Pittsburgh Steelers	Carolina Panthers	W 52–21	22	25	328	5
67	Lamar Jackson	September 8, 2019	Baltimore Ravens	Miami Dolphins	W 59–10	17	20	324	5
68	Dak Prescott	September 8, 2019	Dallas Cowboys	New York Giants	W 35–17	25	32	405	4
69	Deshaun Watson	October 6, 2019	Houston Texans	Atlanta Falcons	W 53–32	28	33	426	5
70	Aaron Rodgers	October 20, 2019	Green Bay Packers	Oakland Raiders	W 42–24	25	31	429	5
71	Lamar Jackson (2)	November 10, 2019	Baltimore Ravens	Cincinnati Bengals	W 49–13	15	17	223	3
72	Tom Brady (3)	December 26, 2020	Tampa Bay Buccaneers	Detroit Lions	W 47–7	22	27	348	4
73	Josh Allen	October 1, 2023	Buffalo Bills	Miami Dolphins	W 48–20	21	25	320	4
74	Brock Purdy	November 19, 2023	San Francisco 49ers	Tampa Bay Buccaneers	W 27–14	21	25	333	3
75	Baker Mayfield	December 17, 2023	Tampa Bay Buccaneers	Green Bay Packers	W 34–20	22	28	381	4
76	Lamar Jackson (3)	December 31, 2023	Baltimore Ravens	Miami Dolphins	W 56–19	18	21	321	5
77	Kyler Murray	September 15, 2024	Arizona Cardinals	Los Angeles Rams	W 41–10	17	21	266	3
78	Lamar Jackson (4)	November 3, 2024	Baltimore Ravens	Denver Broncos	W 41–10	16	19	280	3
79	Jared Goff (2)	November 17, 2024	Detroit Lions	Jacksonville Jaguars	W 52–6	24	29	412	4
80	Jalen Hurts	October 19, 2025	Philadelphia Eagles	Minnesota Vikings	W 28–22	19	23	326	3

=== Postseason ===
Overview of NFL quarterbacks with a perfect passer rating
#	Player	Date	Team	Opponent	Result	Comp.	Att.	Yards	TDs	Game
1	Don Meredith	December 24, 1967	Dallas Cowboys	Cleveland Browns	W 52–14	10	12	212	2	1967 NFL Eastern Conference Championship Game
2	Terry Bradshaw	December 19, 1976	Pittsburgh Steelers	Baltimore Colts	W 40–14	14	18	264	3	1976 AFC Divisional Round
3	Peyton Manning	January 4, 2004	Indianapolis Colts	Denver Broncos	W 49–24	22	26	377	5	2004 AFC Wild Card Round
#	Player	Date	Team	Opponent	Result	Comp.	Att.	Yards	TDs	

=== Most perfect passer rating games ===
Count	Player	Seasons	Team(s)
4	Lamar Jackson	2019 (2), 2023, 2024	Baltimore Ravens
4	Peyton Manning	2000, 2002, 2003, 2004 (Note: Manning's 2004 perfect passer rating game was in the playoffs.)	Indianapolis Colts
3	Tom Brady	2007, 2010, 2020	New England Patriots (2), Tampa Bay Buccaneers
3	Otto Graham	1947 (2), 1954	Cleveland Browns
3	Ben Roethlisberger	2007 (2), 2018	Pittsburgh Steelers
3	Kurt Warner	1999, 2000, 2008	St. Louis Rams (2), Arizona Cardinals
2	Jared Goff	2018, 2024	Los Angeles Rams, Detroit Lions
2	Craig Morton	1969, 1981	Dallas Cowboys, Denver Broncos
2	Ken O'Brien	1986, 1990	New York Jets

=== Most recent perfect passer rating game for each active franchise ===
Franchise (Note: This table lists each active NFL franchise by its current name.)	Date of game	Player	Time since game
Arizona Cardinals	September 15, 2024	Kyler Murray	2 years, 58 days
Atlanta Falcons	September 12, 1993	Bobby Hebert	33 years, 61 days
Baltimore Ravens	November 3, 2024	Lamar Jackson	2 years, 9 days
Buffalo Bills	October 1, 2023	Josh Allen	3 years, 42 days
Carolina Panthers	–	–	–
Chicago Bears	December 7, 1980	Vince Evans	45 years, 340 days
Cincinnati Bengals	October 19, 1995	Jeff Blake	31 years, 24 days
Cleveland Browns	October 29, 1978	Brian Sipe	48 years, 14 days
Dallas Cowboys	September 8, 2019	Dak Prescott	7 years, 65 days
Denver Broncos	September 27, 1981	Craig Morton	45 years, 46 days
Detroit Lions	November 17, 2024	Jared Goff	1 year, 360 days
Green Bay Packers	October 20, 2019	Aaron Rodgers	7 years, 23 days
Houston Texans	October 6, 2019	Deshaun Watson	7 years, 37 days
Indianapolis Colts	January 4, 2004 (Note: Postseason game.)	Peyton Manning	22 years, 312 days
Jacksonville Jaguars	–	–	–
Kansas City Chiefs	December 15, 2013	Alex Smith	12 years, 332 days
Las Vegas Raiders	September 19, 1972	Daryle Lamonica	54 years, 54 days
Los Angeles Chargers	September 26, 1976	Dan Fouts	50 years, 47 days
Los Angeles Rams	September 27, 2018	Jared Goff	8 years, 46 days
Miami Dolphins	September 27, 2018	Ryan Tannehill	8 years, 46 days
Minnesota Vikings	–	–	–
New England Patriots	November 25, 2010	Tom Brady	15 years, 352 days
New Orleans Saints	November 30, 2009	Drew Brees	16 years, 347 days
New York Giants	December 22, 2002	Kerry Collins	23 years, 325 days
New York Jets	December 28, 2014	Geno Smith	11 years, 319 days
Philadelphia Eagles	October 19, 2025	Jalen Hurts	1 year, 24 days
Pittsburgh Steelers	November 8, 2018	Ben Roethlisberger	8 years, 4 days
San Francisco 49ers	November 19, 2023	Brock Purdy	2 years, 358 days
Seattle Seahawks	October 28, 2018	Russell Wilson	8 years, 15 days
Tampa Bay Buccaneers	December 17, 2023	Baker Mayfield	2 years, 330 days
Tennessee Titans	September 13, 2015	Marcus Mariota	11 years, 60 days
Washington Commanders	November 11, 2015	Kirk Cousins	10 years, 362 days

=== Most recent perfect passer rating game at each active stadium ===
Quarterback who had the perfect game was on the home team.
Player is active.

Stadium	Year opened	Date of game	Player	Franchise (Note: This table lists each active NFL franchise by its current name.)	Time since game
Arrowhead Stadium	1972	December 14, 2003	Trent Green	Kansas City Chiefs	22 years, 333 days
AT&T Stadium	2009	September 8, 2019	Dak Prescott	Dallas Cowboys	7 years, 65 days
Acrisure Stadium	2001	November 8, 2018	Ben Roethlisberger	Pittsburgh Steelers	8 years, 4 days
Allegiant Stadium	2020	–	–	–	–
Bank of America Stadium	1996	–	–	–	–
Caesars Superdome	1975	November 30, 2009	Drew Brees	New Orleans Saints	16 years, 347 days
Empower Field at Mile High	2001	–	–	–	–
Everbank Stadium	1995	–	–	–	–
Ford Field	2002	November 17, 2024	Jared Goff	Detroit Lions	1 year, 360 days
Gillette Stadium	2002	–	–	–	–
Hard Rock Stadium	1987	September 8, 2019	Lamar Jackson	Baltimore Ravens	7 years, 65 days
Highmark Stadium	2026	–	–	–	–
Huntington Bank Field	1999	–	–	–	–
Lambeau Field	1957	December 17, 2024	Baker Mayfield	Tampa Bay Buccaneers	1 year, 330 days
Levi's Stadium	2014	November 11, 2023	Brock Purdy	San Francisco 49ers	2 years, 358 days
Lincoln Financial Field	2003	September 23, 2007	Donovan McNabb	Philadelphia Eagles	19 years, 50 days
Lucas Oil Stadium	2008	–	–	–	–
Lumen Field	2002	–	–	–	–
M&T Bank Stadium	1998	November 3, 2024	Lamar Jackson	Baltimore Ravens	2 years, 9 days
Mercedes-Benz Stadium	2017	–	–	–	–
MetLife Stadium (Note: Home stadium of both the New York Giants and New York Jets.)	2010	–	–	–	–
Nissan Stadium	1999	–	–	–	–
Northwest Stadium	1997	November 15, 2015	Kirk Cousins	Washington Commanders	10 years, 362 days
Paycor Stadium	2000	November 10, 2019	Lamar Jackson	Baltimore Ravens	7 years, 2 days
Raymond James Stadium	1998	September 13, 2015	Marcus Mariota	Tennessee Titans	11 years, 60 days
Reliant Stadium	2002	October 6, 2019	Deshaun Watson	Houston Texans	7 years, 37 days
SoFi Stadium (Note: Home stadium of both the Los Angeles Chargers and Los Angeles Rams.)	2020	–	–	–	–
Soldier Field	1924	December 7, 1980	Vince Evans	Chicago Bears	45 years, 340 days
State Farm Stadium	2006	September 15, 2024	Kyler Murray	Arizona Cardinals	2 years, 58 days
U.S. Bank Stadium	2016	October 19, 2025	Jalen Hurts	Philadelphia Eagles	1 year, 24 days

== Statistics ==
Only Nick Foles has accomplished a perfect passer rating with seven touchdowns thrown. Two players have accomplished a perfect passer rating with six touchdowns thrown: Tom Brady and Peyton Manning. Jared Goff is the only player to have two 400-yard, perfect passer games. Thirteen players have accomplished a perfect passer rating with only two touchdowns thrown: it is impossible to achieve a perfect passer rating with fewer than two touchdowns because of the 10 attempt minimum to qualify and the minimum 11.875% touchdown-to-attempted-pass ratio.

Six players have accomplished a perfect passer rating with 30 or more attempts: Jared Goff, Ken O'Brien, Dak Prescott, Aaron Rodgers, Kurt Warner, and Deshaun Watson. Four players have had multiple perfect passer rating games in a single season: Otto Graham (1947), Peyton Manning (2003), Ben Roethlisberger (2007), and Lamar Jackson (2019).

Ryan Tannehill holds the record for the highest completion rate in a perfect game, completing 18 of 19 passes (94.7%) in 2015. Chris Chandler has the best rate for a game with at least 20 pass attempts, completing 23 of 26 passes (88.5%)

Jared Goff has the most passing yards in a perfect game, with 465. Six other players – Nick Foles, Ken O'Brien, Dak Prescott, Aaron Rodgers, Deshaun Watson, and Jared Goff (2nd game) – have each accomplished a perfect passer rating with more than 400 passing yards.

Scott Hunter has the fewest passing yards in a perfect game, with 138. Drew Bledsoe and Rich Gannon also achieved a perfect game with less than 150 yards. The lowest number of yards possible for a perfect game is 125, due to the 10-attempt minimum.

Ben Roethlisberger holds the record of accomplishing a perfect passer rating with most yards per pass attempt (19.8).

Three players have accomplished a perfect passer rating in their rookie season: Drew Bledsoe, Robert Griffin III, and Marcus Mariota. Mariota is the only player to do so in his professional debut. Two players have accomplished a perfect passer rating twice in the same season: Lamar Jackson and Ben Roethlisberger

On two separate occasions, two players achieved a perfect passer rating on the same day. The first occurrence was on October 29, 1978, when Steve Grogan and Brian Sipe each achieved a perfect passer rating. The second occurrence was on September 8, 2019, when both Lamar Jackson and Dak Prescott accomplished the feat.

Tom Brady is the oldest player to have ever post a perfect passer rating, accomplishing the record feat at 43 years, 145 days old. Brady also holds the largest time span between first and last perfect ratings, with 13 years, 66 days.

Drew Bledsoe is the youngest player to attain a perfect rating, having done so at 21 years, 315 days old.

== See also ==
- Perfect game (baseball)
- 300-point game (bowling)
- Maximum break (snooker)
- Nine dart finish (darts)
- List of NFL quarterbacks who have posted a passer rating of zero
- List of 500-yard passing games in the National Football League
