= 1925 Detroit Panthers season =

National Football League team season

- Owner Jimmy Conzelman in 1925
- Owner: Jimmy Conzelman
- Head coach: Jimmy Conzelman
- Home stadium: Navin Field

Results
- Record: 8–2–2
- League place: 3rd NFL

The 1925 Detroit Panthers season marked the team's debut in the National Football League (NFL), following a four year hiatus after the termination of the league's first Motor City franchise, the Detroit Tigers.

The team played 11 of their 12 games at home at Navin Field, later known as Tiger Stadium, finishing with a record of 8 wins, 2 losses, and 2 ties. The Panthers' record was good enough for a third place finish in the league.

The Panthers played in the first Wednesday game in NFL history against the Cleveland Bulldogs, and won 22–13. Future Pro Football Hall of Famer Jimmy Conzelman scored two touchdowns in the first quarter.

== Background ==
=== Organization ===
The Detroit Heralds (renamed the Detroit Tigers in 1921) were an original member of the American Professional Football Association (APFY), forerunner of the National Football League (NFL). Amidst financial losses ensuing from poor attendance and cancellations, the team ceased operations after the 1921 season, leaving a major franchise vacancy in a major city of the upper Middle West.

NFL President Joe F. Carr, oriented towards placing league teams in large cities rather than smaller communities, anxiously sought a return of an NFL franchise to the Motor City. A suitor was found at last ahead of the 1925 season, when star quarterback Jimmy Conzelman, formerly of the Chicago Staleys, before becoming player-coach of the Rock Island Independents and later the Milwaukee Badgers. In March 1925, Carr made Conzelman a sweetheart deal to gain his commitment, reducing the league's franchise fee from $1,000 to just $50 to get the crafty back on board.

After arriving in Detroit, Conzelman made plans to combine football with show business, getting some local theatrical agents interested in underwriting the team in connection a plan to bring the popular Four Horsemen of Notre Dame to play for the Panthers — making it worth everyone's while by combining the NFL season with a 22-week vaudeville tour before and after. Harry Stuhldreher could sing and Jim Crowley could deliver an entertaining monologue and clog dance, but Don Miller and Elmer Layden had no marketable entertainment skills and Conzelman's outside-the-box scheme ultimately came to nothing.

Conzelman scrambled to find other financial backers capable of funding the team through the ups and downs of an NFL season. He ultimately made use of several of his Chicago connections, bringing on board judge (and later governor) Henry Horner, Cook County sheriff Joe Carr, Chicago city alderman Joe McDonough, and a fan named Frankie Lyons as investors.

Conzelman made arrangements to rent Navin Field (home of the American League's Detroit Tigers) at the rate of $1,000 per game.

=== Season review ===
When news broke that college football superstar Red Grange had signed with the Chicago Bears for the second half of the 1925 season, Conzelman made use of his connections with team owner George Halas to book an extra Bears game in Detroit. Fans were excited and the ticket pre-sale indicated that the Panthers stood to clear $20,000 profit on the game, enough to wipe out the team's accrued debt for the year. Unfortunately, the Wednesday before the lucrative December 12 date, Halas telephoned Conzelman to tell him that Grange had been injured and was not expected to play. Conzelman felt honor-bound to make the news available to the press, which spurred a massive rush for refunds, eliminating the possibility of 11th-hour financial salvation.

Despite losing money in 1925, the Panthers managed to field a team for one more year, before being forced from the field by a flood of red ink after the 1926 season. Conzelman surrendered the Detroit franchise back to the league for $1,200.

== Schedule ==
Game	Date	Opponent	Result	Record	Venue	Attendance	Recap	Sources
1	September 27	Columbus Tigers	W 7–0	1–0	Navin Field	3,500	Recap	
2	October 4	Chicago Bears	T 0–0	1–0–1	Navin Field	3,342	Recap	
3	October 11	Frankford Yellow Jackets	W 3–0	2–0–1	Navin Field	3,400	Recap	
4	October 18	Dayton Triangles	W 6–0	3–0–1	Navin Field	4,132	Recap	
5	October 25	Akron Pros	T 0–0	3–0–2	Navin Field	5,400	Recap	
6	November 1	Hammond Pros	W 26–6	4–0–2	Navin Field		Recap	
7	November 8	Milwaukee Badgers	W 21–0	5–0–2	Navin Field		Recap	
8	November 11	Cleveland Bulldogs	W 22–13	6–0–2	Navin Field		Recap	
9	November 15	at Chicago Bears	L 0–14	6–1–2	Wrigley Field	6,200	Recap	
10	November 22	Rochester Jeffersons	W 20–0	7–1–2	Navin Field		Recap	
11	November 26	Rock Island Independents	L 3–6	7–2–2	Navin Field	5,000	Recap	
12	December 12	Chicago Bears	W 21–0	8–2–2	Navin Field	4,111	Recap	
Note: November 11: Wednesday, Armistice Day. Thanksgiving Day: November 26.

== Standings ==
NFL standings
	W	L	T	PCT	PF	PA	STK
Chicago Cardinals *	11	2	1	.846	229	65	W2
Pottsville Maroons *	10	2	0	.833	270	45	W5
Detroit Panthers	8	2	2	.800	129	39	W1
Akron Pros	4	2	2	.667	65	51	L2
New York Giants	8	4	0	.667	122	67	W1
Frankford Yellow Jackets	13	7	0	.650	190	169	W2
Chicago Bears	9	5	3	.643	158	96	W3
Rock Island Independents	5	3	3	.625	99	58	L1
Green Bay Packers	8	5	0	.615	151	110	W1
Providence Steam Roller	6	5	1	.545	111	101	L1
Canton Bulldogs	4	4	0	.500	50	73	L1
Cleveland Bulldogs	5	8	1	.385	75	135	L1
Kansas City Cowboys	2	5	1	.286	65	97	W1
Hammond Pros	1	4	0	.200	23	87	L3
Buffalo Bisons	1	6	2	.143	33	113	L4
Duluth Kelleys	0	3	0	.000	6	25	L3
Rochester Jeffersons	0	6	1	.000	26	111	L5
Milwaukee Badgers	0	6	0	.000	7	191	L6
Dayton Triangles	0	7	1	.000	3	84	L7
Columbus Tigers	0	9	0	.000	28	124	L9

Note: Tie games were not officially counted in the standings until 1972.
* The Pottsville Maroons were suspended from the league in December,
and the Chicago Cardinals named the NFL champions.

== Roster ==
- Bill Bucher, end, 1 game, 180 pounds, 5-10, Clarkson
- Jimmy Conzelman, tailback, 12 games, 175 pounds, 6-0, Washington (MO)
- Al Crook, center, 8 games, 190 pounds, 5-10, Washington & Jefferson
- Dinger Doane, fullback, 11 games, 190 pounds, 5-10, Tufts
- Walt Ellis, tackle, 1 game, 224 pounds, 5-11, Univ. of Detroit
- Jack Fleischman, guard, 9 games, 184 pounds, 5-6, Purdue
- Al Hadden, back, 12 games, 186 pounds, 5-9, Washington & Jefferson
- Tom Hogan, tackle, 11 games, 193 pounds, 6-2, Univ. of Detroit, Fordham
- Vivian Hultman, end, 11 games, 178 pounds, 5-8, Michigan St.
- Dutch Lauer, tailback, 11 games, 185 pounds, 5-10, Univ. of Detroit
- Dutch Marion, fullback, 10 games, 180 pounds, 5-9, Washington & Jefferson, Michigan
- Tom McNamara, guard, 12 games, 210 pounds, 5-10, Tufts, Univ. of Detroit
- Russ Smith, guard, 9 games, 220 pounds, 5-10, Navy, Southern Illinois, Illinois
- Gus Sonnenberg, tackle, 12 games, 196 pounds, 5-6, Dartmouth, Univ. of Detroit
- Dick Vick, back, 11 games, 167 pounds, 5-9, Washington & Jefferson
- Ernie Vick, center, 10 games, 190 pounds, 5-10, Michigan
- Tillie Voss, end, 10 games, 207 pounds, 6-3, Univ. of Detroit
- By Wimberly, tackle, 11 games, 200 pounds, 6-2, Washington & Jefferson
