= 1925 NFL season =

American football season

Regular season
- Duration: September 20 – December 20, 1925
- A controversial ruling by the NFL suspended the Pottsville Maroons from all league privileges, including the right to play for the NFL championship.
- Champions: Chicago Cardinals

NFL teams

The 1925 NFL season was the sixth regular season of the National Football League. Five new teams entered the league: New York Giants, Detroit Panthers, Pottsville Maroons, Providence Steam Roller, and a new Canton Bulldogs team. The Kenosha Maroons folded, with the Racine Legion and Minneapolis Marines mothballing.

== Teams ==
Twenty teams competed in the NFL during the 1925 season.

First season in NFL *	Last active season ^	Last season before hiatus, rejoined league later §
Team jumped to the AFL †	Rejoined the NFL **	

Team	Head coach(es)	Stadium
Akron Pros	Scotty Bierce	Akron League Park
Buffalo Bisons	Walt Koppisch	Bison Stadium
Canton Bulldogs **	Harry Robb	League Field
Chicago Bears	George Halas	Cubs Park
Chicago Cardinals	Norman Barry	Comiskey Park
Cleveland Bulldogs §	Cap Edwards	Dunn Field
Columbus Tigers	Red Weaver	West Side Athletic Club
Dayton Triangles	Carl Storck	Triangle Park
Detroit Panthers *	Jimmy Conzelman	Navin Field
Duluth Kelleys	Dewey Scanlon	Duluth Athletic Park
Frankford Yellow Jackets	Guy Chamberlin	Frankford Stadium
Green Bay Packers	Curly Lambeau	City Stadium
Hammond Pros	Fritz Pollard (1 game) and Doc Young (4 games)	Traveling team
Kansas City Cowboys	Roy Andrews	Muehlebach Field
Milwaukee Badgers	Johnny Bryan	Milwaukee Athletic Park
New York Giants *	Bob Folwell	Polo Grounds
Pottsville Maroons	Dick Rauch	Minersville Park
Providence Steam Roller *	Archie Golembeski	Cycledrome
Rochester Jeffersons ^	Tex Grigg	Edgerton Park
Rock Island Independents †	Rube Ursella	Douglas Park

== Background ==
=== Winter meeting ===
The annual winter meeting of National Football League owners was held on the weekend of January 24–25 at the Statler Hotel in Cleveland. Representatives of 18 NFL teams were in attendance. The owners re-elected an executive committee consisting of league president Joe F. Carr, vice president John Dunn, and secretary-treasurer Carl Storck and approved a starting date of September 20 and hard termination date of December 20 for the 1925 season.

On the second day of the meeting, the owners formally awarded the 1924 pennant to the Cleveland Bulldogs, bringing an end to a protracted debate over the NFL championship for that year. The arrangement of any "post-season" game between top teams of the league to determine a champion for the forthcoming 1925 season was expressly forbidden by President Carr.

Applications for new franchises were received from Detroit, Cincinnati, Providence, Rhode Island, and Pottsville, Pennsylvania — with Detroit, Providence, and Pottsville eventually fielding teams for the 1925 season. President Carr also used the league meeting as an opportunity to network among owners, expressing his considered opinion that the large crowds drawn by league teams in Chicago, Philadelphia, and Cleveland illuminated a path forward for the struggling league — teams located in major urban centers, with new franchises for New York City and Detroit made the top priority.

=== New York Football Giants ===
League president Carr took it upon himself to recruit an owner for a New York City franchise. In fairly short order, New York friends connected the top NFL official with a sports promotor with an eye for future profit, a 37-year old professional bookmaker named Tim Mara. Mara had begun in the gambling industry — legal in New York State at the time — in his teenage years, first working as a "runner" for established bookies, collecting lost bets and delivering payouts before becoming a successful bookmaker in his own right.

When first introduced to Carr, Mara asked about the league fee for a franchise. Told the fee was $2,500, including what was essentially a performance bond, Mara immediately accepted, declaring: "A New York franchise in anything should be worth $2,500, including one for shining shoes. I'll take it." Mara wrote a check to Carr, the two shook hands, and the deal was done — the New York Football Giants were born.

=== Summer scheduling meeting ===
There were twenty teams in the National Football League in 1925, an increase of two from the previous season. Three teams had their final year in 1924 — the Kenosha Maroons, Racine Legion, and Minneapolis Marines — and were replaced by the Providence Steam Roller, Pottsville Maroons, and President Carr's pet projects in Detroit and New York City, as well as a return to action by a reorganized Canton Bulldogs team.

The teams competed in a single group without divisions. Games were on an ad hoc basis, with teams booking their own dates and opponents. The lack of centralized official scheduling caused controversy at the end of the season when Cardinals owner Chris O'Brien hastily added two games against weak teams to edge out the expansion Pottsville Maroons for best record in the league and the championship pennant.

Scheduling was largely conducted around the league's summer meeting, held in Chicago the weekend of August 1–2.

=== Attendance ===
Even the teams from major urban centers faced spotty attendance, frequently driven by the weather — this in an era before mass media, and where Sunday blue laws were still well in effect. In Chicago, a city in which 50,000 fans regularly turned out to Stagg Field to watch the University of Chicago football team on a Saturday, the Chicago Bears still struggled to get 10,000 fans on Sundays. The Bears struggled to break even; for other teams from locations with smaller fanbases and fewer tickets to sell, the economic situation was worse.

== Season highlights ==
The 1925 season was dominated by the decision of University of Illinois superstar halfback Red Grange to enter the league in November as a member of the Chicago Bears. Making his professional debut on Thanksgiving Day against the rival Chicago Cardinals, a standing room only crowd of 36,000 saw the legendary "Galloping Ghost" stymied in a scoreless tie. Three days later the Bears won against the Columbus Tigers 14–13 in the Chicago snow.

A tour to cash in on Grange's popularity followed, beginning with a game against a pick-up team in St. Louis in which Grange ran for 175 yards and 4 touchdowns, stoking the media flame. The Bears played 8 games in 12 days during the tour, and had a crowd of 73,000 at New York's Polo Grounds — a record attendance for a professional football game and an unexpected financial windfall that helped save the expansion New York Giants from catastrophe in their maiden season. Minor injuries forced Grange to sit out of a hastily scheduled rematch with the expansion Detroit Panthers — a decision which lead to massive lines for ticket refunds, eliminating a profit that might have been enough to save the Panthers organization.

== 1925 NFL Championship controversy ==
Controversy surrounds the 1925 NFL Championship. The Chicago Cardinals are listed as the 1925 NFL champions because they finished with the best record; however, many Pottsville fans at the time claimed that the Maroons were the legitimate champions. The Maroons and the Cardinals were the top contenders for the title, and Pottsville won a late-season meeting between them, 21–7. But the Maroons scheduled a game against a team of University of Notre Dame All-Stars in Philadelphia (which they won 9–7) on the same day that the Frankford Yellow Jackets were scheduled to play a game in the same city. Frankford protested, saying that the Maroons game violated their protected territory rights.

Although NFL president Joe Carr warned the Maroons in writing that they faced suspension if they played in Philadelphia on the same day as Frankford's game, the Maroons claimed that Carr had previously approved their game during a telephone call, and they played anyway. In response, Carr fined the club, suspended it from all league rights and privileges (including the right to play for the NFL championship), and returned its franchise to the league.

In 2003, the NFL decided to permit a reexamination of the 1925 championship. In October of that year, the NFL voted 30–2 not to reopen the case, with only Philadelphia and Pittsburgh, the league's two Pennsylvania-based teams, voting in favor. Thus, the Cardinals are listed as the 1925 NFL champions.

Had the current (post-1972) system of counting ties as half a win and half a loss been in place in 1925, the Maroons would have won the championship with a win percentage of .833, and the Cardinals would have finished runner-up at .821.

== Standings ==
NFL standings
	W	L	T	PCT	PF	PA	STK
Chicago Cardinals *	11	2	1	.846	230	65	W2
Pottsville Maroons *	10	2	0	.833	270	45	W5
Detroit Panthers	8	2	2	.800	129	39	W1
Akron Pros	4	2	2	.667	65	51	L2
New York Giants	8	4	0	.667	122	67	W1
Frankford Yellow Jackets	13	7	0	.650	190	169	W2
Chicago Bears	9	5	3	.643	158	96	W3
Rock Island Independents	5	3	3	.625	99	58	L1
Green Bay Packers	8	5	0	.615	151	110	W1
Providence Steam Roller	6	5	1	.545	111	101	L1
Canton Bulldogs	4	4	0	.500	50	73	L1
Cleveland Bulldogs	5	8	1	.385	75	135	L1
Kansas City Cowboys	2	5	1	.286	65	97	W1
Hammond Pros	1	4	0	.200	23	87	L3
Buffalo Bisons	1	6	2	.143	33	113	L4
Duluth Kelleys	0	3	0	.000	6	25	L3
Rochester Jeffersons	0	6	1	.000	26	111	L5
Milwaukee Badgers	0	6	0	.000	7	191	L6
Dayton Triangles	0	7	1	.000	3	84	L7
Columbus Tigers	0	9	0	.000	28	124	L9

Note: Tie games were not officially counted in the standings until 1972.
* The Pottsville Maroons were suspended from the league in December,
and the Chicago Cardinals named the NFL champions.

== All star team ==
NFL league president Joseph Carr chose an all-star team for 1925, including players from Red Grange's tour.

=== Ends ===
- Lynn Bomar, New York Giants
- Paul G. Goebel, Columbus Tigers

=== Tackles ===
- Ed Healey, Chicago Bears
- Link Lyman, Cleveland Bulldogs

=== Guards ===
- Butch Spagna, Frankfort Yellow Jackets
- John Alexander, New York Giants

=== Center ===
- Herb Stein, Pottsville Maroons

=== Quarterback ===
- Joey Sternaman, Chicago Bears

=== Halfbacks ===
- Red Grange, Chicago Bears
- Red Barron, Coral Gables All-Stars

=== Fullback ===
- Jack McBride, New York Giants
