= 1925 New York Giants season =

NFL team season (inaugural)

- Owner: Tim Mara
- Head coach: Bob Folwell
- Home stadium: Polo Grounds

Results
- Record: 8–4 NFL (11–6 Overall)
- League place: 4th NFL

The 1925 New York Football Giants season was the franchise's inaugural campaign in the National Football League (NFL). Playing three-quarters of its league games at home in front of substantial crowds at the Polo Grounds, the team finished with a record of 8–4 against National League opponents.

== Background ==
On August 1, 1925, Timothy Mara and Will Gibson were granted a franchise by the National Football League (NFL) for their newly organized team in New York City — the New York Football Giants. Cost of the franchise was $2,500.

== Schedule ==
Game	Date	Opponent	Result	Record	Venue	Attendance	Recap	Sources
–	September 27	at Newark Red Jackets	W 3–0	—	Dreamland Park		—	
–	October 4	at Ducky Pond's All-Stars	W 26–0	—	Willow Brook Park; New Britain, CT	3,000+	—	
1	October 11	at Providence Steam Roller	L 0–14	0–1	Cycledrome	8,000	Recap	
2	October 17	at Frankford Yellow Jackets	L 3–5	0–2	Frankford Stadium	15,000	Recap	
3	October 18	Frankford Yellow Jackets	L 0–14	0–3	Polo Grounds	27,000	Recap	
–	October 25	Buffalo Bisons	postponed to Nov. 3 due to rain					
4	November 1	Cleveland Bulldogs	W 19–0	1–3	Polo Grounds	18,000	Recap	
5	November 3	Buffalo Bisons	W 7–0	2–3	Polo Grounds	20,000	Recap	
6	November 8	Columbus Tigers	W 19–0	3–3	Polo Grounds	<4,000	Recap	
7	November 11	Rochester Jeffersons	W 13–0	4–3	Polo Grounds	10,000	Recap	
8	November 15	Providence Steam Roller	W 13–12	5–3	Polo Grounds	20,000	Recap	
9	November 22	Kansas City Cowboys	W 9–3	6–3	Polo Grounds	26,000	Recap	
–	November 26	at Staten Island Stapletons	W 7–0	—	Thompson Stadium	10,000	—	
10	November 29	Dayton Triangles	W 23–0	7–3	Polo Grounds	18,000	Recap	
11	December 6	Chicago Bears	L 7–19	7–4	Polo Grounds	68,000	Recap	
12	December 13	at Chicago Bears	W 9–0	8–4	Cubs Park	18,000	Recap	
Note: Non-NFL opponents in italics. Armistice Day: November 11. Thanksgiving Day: November 26.

== Game summaries ==
NFL contests only; summaries for games against non-league teams are unavailable.

=== Game 1: at Providence Steam Roller ===
Week Four: New York Giants at Providence Steam Roller

Quarter	1	2	3	4	Total
Giants	0	0	0	0	0
Steam Roller	0	14	0	0	14

at Cycledrome, Providence, Rhode Island

- Date: October 11
- Game attendance: 8,000

Game information

Second quarter

- PRO Franny Garvey blocked punt recovery in end zone (Dutch Connor kick)
- PRO Cy Wentworth 92-yard kickoff return (Connor kick)

=== Game 2: at Frankford Yellow Jackets ===
Week Five: New York Giants at Frankford Yellow Jackets (Game 1)

Quarter	1	2	3	4	Total
Giants	0	3	0	0	3
Yellow Jackets	2	0	3	0	5

at Frankford Stadium, Philadelphia, Pennsylvania

- Date: October 17
- Game attendance: 15,000

Game information

First quarter

- FRA Guy Chamberlin blocked Jim Thorpe punt in end zone for a safety

Second quarter

- NYG Matt Brennan 15-yard FG

Third quarter

- FRA Bull Behman 40-yard FG

=== Game 3: vs. Frankford Yellow Jackets ===
Week Five: Frankford Yellow Jackets at New York Giants (Game 2)

Quarter	1	2	3	4	Total
Yellow Jackets	7	7	0	0	14
Giants	0	0	0	0	0

at Polo Grounds, New York, New York

- Date: October 18
- Game attendance: 27,000

Game information

First quarter

- FRA Les Haws 9-yard run (Behman kick)

Second quarter

- FRA Tex Hamer 6-yard run (Behman kick)

=== Game 4: vs. Cleveland Bulldogs ===
Week Seven: Cleveland Bulldogs at New York Giants

Quarter	1	2	3	4	Total
Bulldogs	0	0	0	0	0
Giants	6	7	0	6	19

at Polo Grounds, New York, New York

- Date: November 1
- Game attendance: 18,000

Game information

First quarter

- NYG Hinkey Haines run (kick failed)

Second quarter

- NYG Haines 28-yard pass from Jack McBride (Dutch Hendrian kick)

Fourth quarter

- NYG Joe Williams run (kick failed)

=== Game 5: vs. Buffalo Bisons ===
Week Eight, Game One: Buffalo Bisons at New York Giants

Quarter	1	2	3	4	Total
Bisons	0	0	0	0	0
Giants	0	7	0	0	7

at Polo Grounds, New York, New York

- Date: November 3
- Game attendance: 20,000

Game information

Second quarter

- NYG McBride run (McBride kick)

=== Game 6: vs. Columbus Tigers ===
The November 8 game against the Columbus Tigers was played in a driving rain which fell continuously throughout the contest, keeping the attendance down to fewer than 4,000 spectators. Although marking the third consecutive National League victory for the expansion Giants, the win came at substantial cost when star halfback Hinkey Haines suffered a broken nose shortly after kickoff, with fears being aired that his injury was so severe that he could be lost for the rest of the season. The Giants drew blood in the opening frame when Jack McBride hit Dutch Hendrian with a 10 yard pass from the Columbus 40, with Hendrian taking the ball the final 30 yards on a gallop through the thick Polo Grounds mud. Columbus missed a 20 yard field goal attempt and later threw a pick from the 10-yard line, thus squandering their two best chances at scoring. The Football Giants added two touchdowns in the fourth, one a 20 yard run by Bill Rooney and the other an interception returned 50 yards for a touchdown by Doc Alexander to finish the 19–0 shutout of the Tigers.

Week Eight, Game Two: Columbus Tigers at New York Giants

Quarter	1	2	3	4	Total
Tigers	0	0	0	0	0
Giants	7	0	0	12	19

at Polo Grounds, New York, New York

- Date: November 8
- Game attendance: 4,000

Game information

First quarter

- NYG Hendrian 35-yard pass from McBride (McBride kick)

Fourth quarter

- NYG Bill Rooney run (kick failed)
- NYG Doc Alexander 50-yard interception return

=== Game 7: vs. Rochester Jeffersons ===
Week Nine, Game One: Rochester Jeffersons at New York Giants

Quarter	1	2	3	4	Total
Jeffersons	0	0	0	0	0
Giants	10	3	0	0	13

at Polo Grounds, New York, New York

- Date: November 11
- Game attendance: 10,000

Game information

First quarter

- NYG Lynn Bomar 27-yard pass from McBride (McBride kick)
- NYG Hendrian 35-yard FG

Second quarter

- NYG Hendrian 25-yard FG

=== Game 8: vs. Providence Steam Roller ===
Week Nine, Game Two: Providence Steam Roller at New York Giants

Quarter	1	2	3	4	Total
Steam Roller	0	3	0	9	12
Giants	7	0	6	0	13

at Polo Grounds, New York, New York

- Date: November 15
- Game attendance: 20,000

Game information

First quarter

- NYG Bomar 24-yard pass from McBride (McBride kick)

Second quarter

- PRO Jim Laird 35-yard FG

Third quarter

- NYG McBride run (kick failed)

Fourth quarter

- PRO Laird run (Laird kick)
- PRO Ball downed in end zone by Haines for a safety

=== Game 9: vs. Kansas City Cowboys ===
Week Ten: Kansas City Cowboys at New York Giants

Quarter	1	2	3	4	Total
Cowboys	0	3	0	0	3
Giants	6	0	3	0	9

at Polo Grounds, New York, New York

- Date: November 22
- Game attendance: 26,000

Game information

First quarter

- NYG Haines 1-yard run (kick failed)

Second quarter

- KC Al Bloodgood 30-yard FG

Third quarter

- NYG Hendrian 25-yard FG

=== Game 10: vs. Dayton Triangles ===
Week Eleven: Dayton Triangles at New York Giants

Quarter	1	2	3	4	Total
Triangles	0	0	0	0	0
Giants	7	10	6	0	23

at Polo Grounds, New York, New York

- Date: November 29
- Game attendance: 18,000

Game information

First quarter

- NYG Bomar 45-yard pass from McBride (McBride kick)

Second quarter

- NYG Hendrian 34 pass from McBride (McBride kick)
- NYG McBride 30-yard FG

Third quarter

- NYG Phil White 8-yard run (kick failed)

=== Game 11: vs. Chicago Bears ===
Week Twelve: Chicago Bears at New York Giants

Quarter	1	2	3	4	Total
Bears	12	0	0	7	19
Giants	0	7	0	0	7

at Polo Grounds, New York, New York

- Date: December 6
- Game attendance: 68,000 (plus approx. 8,000 gate crashers)

Game information

First quarter

- CHB Joey Sternaman run (kick failed)
- CHB Sternaman run (kick failed)

Second quarter

- NYG White run (McBride kick)

Fourth quarter

- CHB Red Grange 35-yard interception return (Sternaman kick)

=== Game 12: at Chicago Bears ===
Week Thirteen: New York Giants at Chicago Bears

Quarter	1	2	3	4	Total
Giants	3	0	0	6	9
Bears	0	0	0	0	0

at Cubs Park, Chicago, Illinois

- Date: December 13
- Game attendance: 18,000

Game information

First quarter

- NYG McBride 40-yard FG

Fourth quarter

- NYG White 1-yard run (kick failed)

== Standings ==
NFL standings
	W	L	T	PCT	PF	PA	STK
Chicago Cardinals *	11	2	1	.846	229	65	W2
Pottsville Maroons *	10	2	0	.833	270	45	W5
Detroit Panthers	8	2	2	.800	129	39	W1
Akron Pros	4	2	2	.667	65	51	L2
New York Giants	8	4	0	.667	122	67	W1
Frankford Yellow Jackets	13	7	0	.650	190	169	W2
Chicago Bears	9	5	3	.643	158	96	W3
Rock Island Independents	5	3	3	.625	99	58	L1
Green Bay Packers	8	5	0	.615	151	110	W1
Providence Steam Roller	6	5	1	.545	111	101	L1
Canton Bulldogs	4	4	0	.500	50	73	L1
Cleveland Bulldogs	5	8	1	.385	75	135	L1
Kansas City Cowboys	2	5	1	.286	65	97	W1
Hammond Pros	1	4	0	.200	23	87	L3
Buffalo Bisons	1	6	2	.143	33	113	L4
Duluth Kelleys	0	3	0	.000	6	25	L3
Rochester Jeffersons	0	6	1	.000	26	111	L5
Milwaukee Badgers	0	6	0	.000	7	191	L6
Dayton Triangles	0	7	1	.000	3	84	L7
Columbus Tigers	0	9	0	.000	28	124	L9

Note: Tie games were not officially counted in the standings until 1972.
* The Pottsville Maroons were suspended from the league in December,
and the Chicago Cardinals named the NFL champions.

== See also ==
- List of New York Giants seasons
