= 1925 Dayton Triangles season =

National Football League team season

- Head coach: Carl Storck
- Home stadium: Traveling team

Results
- Record: 0–7–2 Overall; 0–7–1 NFL
- League place: T–16th NFL

The 1925 Dayton Triangles season was their sixth in the league. The team failed to improve on their previous output of 2–6, losing seven games. They tied for sixteenth place in the league.

== Schedule ==
Game	Date	Opponent	Result	Record	Venue	Attendance	Recap	Sources
1	September 27	at Rock Island Independents	T 0–0	0–0–1	Douglas Park	2,500	Recap	
2	October 4	at Canton Bulldogs	L 0–14	0–1–1	League Field		Recap	
3	October 18	at Detroit Panthers	L 0–6	0–2–1	Navin Field	4,132	Recap	
4	October 24	at Frankford Yellow Jackets	L 0–3	0–3–1	Frankford Stadium	2,000	Recap	
5	November 1	at Akron Pros	L 3–17	0–4–1	General Field	2,500	Recap	
–	November 8	at Steubenville-Toronto	T 0–0	—			—	
6	November 15	at Green Bay Packers	L 0–7	0–5–1	City Stadium	3,000	Recap	
7	November 22	at Chicago Cardinals	L 0–14	0–6–1	Comiskey Park	3,000	Recap	
8	November 29	at New York Giants	L 0–23	0–7–1	Polo Grounds	18,000	Recap	
Note: Games in italics are against non-NFL teams.

== Standings ==
NFL standings
	W	L	T	PCT	PF	PA	STK
Chicago Cardinals *	11	2	1	.846	229	65	W2
Pottsville Maroons *	10	2	0	.833	270	45	W5
Detroit Panthers	8	2	2	.800	129	39	W1
Akron Pros	4	2	2	.667	65	51	L2
New York Giants	8	4	0	.667	122	67	W1
Frankford Yellow Jackets	13	7	0	.650	190	169	W2
Chicago Bears	9	5	3	.643	158	96	W3
Rock Island Independents	5	3	3	.625	99	58	L1
Green Bay Packers	8	5	0	.615	151	110	W1
Providence Steam Roller	6	5	1	.545	111	101	L1
Canton Bulldogs	4	4	0	.500	50	73	L1
Cleveland Bulldogs	5	8	1	.385	75	135	L1
Kansas City Cowboys	2	5	1	.286	65	97	W1
Hammond Pros	1	4	0	.200	23	87	L3
Buffalo Bisons	1	6	2	.143	33	113	L4
Duluth Kelleys	0	3	0	.000	6	25	L3
Rochester Jeffersons	0	6	1	.000	26	111	L5
Milwaukee Badgers	0	6	0	.000	7	191	L6
Dayton Triangles	0	7	1	.000	3	84	L7
Columbus Tigers	0	9	0	.000	28	124	L9

Note: Tie games were not officially counted in the standings until 1972.
* The Pottsville Maroons were suspended from the league in December,
and the Chicago Cardinals named the NFL champions.
