= 1925 Canton Bulldogs season =

National Football League team season

- Head coach: Harry Robb
- Home stadium: League Field

Results
- Record: 4–4 NFL; 8–4–1 Overall
- League place: 11th NFL

The 1925 Canton Bulldogs season was their fifth in the National Football League and their first season since 1923. The team failed to improve on their previous record against NFL opponents of 11–0–1, winning only four NFL games. They finished eleventh in the league.

== Schedule ==
| Game | Date | Opponent | Result | Record | Venue | Attendance | Recap | Sources |
|---|---|---|---|---|---|---|---|---|
| – | September 20 | Massillon Blues | W 27–0 | — | League Field | | — | |
| 1 | September 27 | Rochester Jeffersons | W 14–7 | 1–0 | League Field | | Recap | |
| 2 | October 4 | Dayton Triangles | W 14–0 | 2–0 | League Field | | Recap | |
| 3 | October 10 | at Frankford Yellow Jackets | L 7–12 | 2–1 | Frankford Stadium | 15,000 | Recap | |
| 4 | October 11 | at Pottsville Maroons | L 0–28 | 2–2 | Minersville Park | | Recap | |
| 5 | October 18 | Akron Pros | L 3–20 | 2–3 | League Field | 5,000 | Recap | |
| – | November 1 | Steubenville-Toronto | T 3–3 | — | League Field | | — | |
| 6 | November 8 | Cleveland Bulldogs | W 6–0 | 3–3 | League Field | 2,000 | Recap | |
| 7 | November 22 | Columbus Tigers | W 6–0 | 4–3 | League Field | | Recap | |
| – | November 26 | at Ironton Tanks | W 12–0 | — | | | — | |
| – | November 29 | Steubenville-Toronto | W 7–6 | — | League Field | | — | |
| 8 | December 6 | at Cleveland Bulldogs | L 0–6 | 4–4 | Dunn Field | | Recap | |
| – | December 6 | Farrell, Pennsylvania | W 14–3 | — | Sharon, PA | | — | |
Note: Games in italics are against non-NFL teams. Thanksgiving Day: November 26.

== Standings ==
NFL standings
| | W | L | T | PCT | PF | PA | STK |
|---|---|---|---|---|---|---|---|
| Chicago Cardinals * | 11 | 2 | 1 | .846 | 229 | 65 | W2 |
| Pottsville Maroons * | 10 | 2 | 0 | .833 | 270 | 45 | W5 |
| Detroit Panthers | 8 | 2 | 2 | .800 | 129 | 39 | W1 |
| Akron Pros | 4 | 2 | 2 | .667 | 65 | 51 | L2 |
| New York Giants | 8 | 4 | 0 | .667 | 122 | 67 | W1 |
| Frankford Yellow Jackets | 13 | 7 | 0 | .650 | 190 | 169 | W2 |
| Chicago Bears | 9 | 5 | 3 | .643 | 158 | 96 | W3 |
| Rock Island Independents | 5 | 3 | 3 | .625 | 99 | 58 | L1 |
| Green Bay Packers | 8 | 5 | 0 | .615 | 151 | 110 | W1 |
| Providence Steam Roller | 6 | 5 | 1 | .545 | 111 | 101 | L1 |
| Canton Bulldogs | 4 | 4 | 0 | .500 | 50 | 73 | L1 |
| Cleveland Bulldogs | 5 | 8 | 1 | .385 | 75 | 135 | L1 |
| Kansas City Cowboys | 2 | 5 | 1 | .286 | 65 | 97 | W1 |
| Hammond Pros | 1 | 4 | 0 | .200 | 23 | 87 | L3 |
| Buffalo Bisons | 1 | 6 | 2 | .143 | 33 | 113 | L4 |
| Duluth Kelleys | 0 | 3 | 0 | .000 | 6 | 25 | L3 |
| Rochester Jeffersons | 0 | 6 | 1 | .000 | 26 | 111 | L5 |
| Milwaukee Badgers | 0 | 6 | 0 | .000 | 7 | 191 | L6 |
| Dayton Triangles | 0 | 7 | 1 | .000 | 3 | 84 | L7 |
| Columbus Tigers | 0 | 9 | 0 | .000 | 28 | 124 | L9 |

Note: Tie games were not officially counted in the standings until 1972.
* The Pottsville Maroons were suspended from the league in December,
and the Chicago Cardinals named the NFL champions.
