= 1925 Rock Island Independents season =

National Football League team season

- Owner: Dale Johnson
- General manager: A.H. Bowlby
- Head coach: Rube Ursella
- Home stadium: Douglas Park

Results
- Record: 5–3–3 NFL; 6–3–3 overall
- League place: 8th in NFL

The 1925 Rock Island Independents season was their sixth and final season in the National Football League. The team failed to improve on their previous league record of 5–2–2, losing three NFL games. They finished eighth in the NFL.

The team would join the upstart rival American Football League for the 1926 season.

== Background ==
The 1925 season would prove to be the final campaign of the Rock Island Independents as part of the National Football League. The year started promisingly, with business manager A.H. Bowlby representing the club at the league's annual scheduling meeting, held the weekend of August 1–2 at the Sherman Hotel in Chicago. Interest in booking the Independents for 1925 was high, with Chris O'Brien, owner of the Chicago Cardinals, and representatives of the Duluth Kelleys immediately seeking to schedule home-and-home dates and other teams lining up for single games.

This early agreement with the Cardinals would become the focus of a disagreement in October, when Bowlby managed to add a game with the Chicago Bears at Cubs Park to fill what had become an open date on November 1. O'Brien objected to the appearance of the Green-and-White in the Windy City to start November, believing that it would undercut attendance for the previously scheduled game against the Cardinals on November 29. After negotiations, both games were ultimately held.

== Schedule ==
The 1925 Independents schedule as announced following the August 1–2 owners' meeting in Chicago.

Game	Date	Opponent	Result	Record	Venue	Attendance	Recap	Sources
1	September 20	Chicago Bears	T 0–0	0–0–1	Douglas Park	2,500	Recap	
2	September 27	Dayton Triangles	T 0–0	0–0–2	Douglas Park	2,500	Recap	
3	October 4	Green Bay Packers	W 3–0	1–0–2	Douglas Park	3,500	Recap	
4	October 11	at Duluth Kelleys	W 12–0	2–0–2	Athletic Park	4,000	Recap	
5	October 18	at Green Bay Packers	L 0–20	2–1–2	City Stadium	5,000	Recap	
6	October 25	Kansas City Cowboys	T 3–3	2–1–3	Douglas Park	1,500	Recap	
7	November 1	at Chicago Bears	L 0–6	2–2–3	Cubs Park	8,000	Recap	
–	November 8	Hammond Pros	Canceled due to snow					
–	November 11	at Clinton Legion	W 23–6	—	Clinton, Iowa		—	
8	November 15	Kansas City Cowboys	W 35–12	3–2–3	Douglas Park	1,500	Recap	
9	November 22	Milwaukee Badgers	W 40–7	4–2–3	Douglas Park	1,200	Recap	
10	November 26	at Detroit Panthers	W 6–3	5–2–3	Navin Field	5,000	Recap	
11	November 29	at Chicago Cardinals	L 0–7	5–3–3	Comiskey Park	3,000	Recap	
Note: Game in italics against non-NFL team. Armistice Day: Nov. 11. Thanksgiving Day: Nov. 26.

== Standings ==
NFL standings
	W	L	T	PCT	PF	PA	STK
Chicago Cardinals *	11	2	1	.846	229	65	W2
Pottsville Maroons *	10	2	0	.833	270	45	W5
Detroit Panthers	8	2	2	.800	129	39	W1
Akron Pros	4	2	2	.667	65	51	L2
New York Giants	8	4	0	.667	122	67	W1
Frankford Yellow Jackets	13	7	0	.650	190	169	W2
Chicago Bears	9	5	3	.643	158	96	W3
Rock Island Independents	5	3	3	.625	99	58	L1
Green Bay Packers	8	5	0	.615	151	110	W1
Providence Steam Roller	6	5	1	.545	111	101	L1
Canton Bulldogs	4	4	0	.500	50	73	L1
Cleveland Bulldogs	5	8	1	.385	75	135	L1
Kansas City Cowboys	2	5	1	.286	65	97	W1
Hammond Pros	1	4	0	.200	23	87	L3
Buffalo Bisons	1	6	2	.143	33	113	L4
Duluth Kelleys	0	3	0	.000	6	25	L3
Rochester Jeffersons	0	6	1	.000	26	111	L5
Milwaukee Badgers	0	6	0	.000	7	191	L6
Dayton Triangles	0	7	1	.000	3	84	L7
Columbus Tigers	0	9	0	.000	28	124	L9

Note: Tie games were not officially counted in the standings until 1972.
* The Pottsville Maroons were suspended from the league in December,
and the Chicago Cardinals named the NFL champions.

== Season review ==
The year started with two scoreless ties and a 3–0 victory over the Green Bay Packers. Even the feel-good moment of an upset victory in the third game proved short-lived, however, when a rematch with the Packers two weeks later ended in a 20–0 loss regarded as the worst defeat in Rock Island franchise history.

Despite continued extensive and positive coverage in the four daily newspapers of the Rock Island–Moline–Davenport metro area, paid attendance at home games went into the tank, with only 1,500 fans showing up for a game with the Kansas City Cowboys traveling team. Legendary halfback Jim Thorpe was added to the Independents' roster for a rematch three weeks later after having started the season with the New York Giants.

Business manager Bowlby expressed disappointment over the attendance of the first three home games in 1925, noting that paid admissions had been insufficient to cover expenses of the team. "We are losing money every day at home," Bowlby told one reporter, adding that in 1924 a weaker team had achieved almost double the average attendance. The little town of Green Bay, population 35,000, could put 5,000 bodies into the stands to see Rock Island play; the 165,000 people of the Tri-Cities could muster barely more than half of that. The situation cut deep.

The Islanders hoped for a saving turnout of 10,000 for its next home date, slated for November 8 against the Hammond Pros. Instead, they were met with disaster. A fall snowstorm blanketed the field with snow, chasing away prospective fans. The call was made not to play in the elements after the visitors had traveled to Douglas Field from Indiana, presumably putting the home team on the hook for payment of visitor travel costs.

Presold tickets were to be valid for a makeup game scheduled for November 22, initially planned as the completion of the postponed game with Hammond but ultimately played against the Milwaukee Badgers. An Armistice Day game on the road against the American Legion team of Clinton, Iowa — no better than a break-even proposition financially — was scheduled as a stop-gap.

As the 1925 season came down the home stretch, the Islanders' financial situation was clearly perilous. One local newspaper warned that "the future of National League football in the tri-cities rests on the attendance at the Kansas City game and civic clubs are cooperating with the Islanders in their efforts to keep Sunday football." Another paper editorialized that attendance at the November 22 second Kansas City game "will answer locally as to whether fans desire a continuance here of professional football as furnished by the Independents."

The result of the call to arms proved underwhelming, with "a handful of fans, perhaps 1,500," making their way to the turnstiles to support the home team in their resounding 35–12 win over the overmatched Kansas City squad. Despite failing the exam, Tri-City fans were given a final opportunity to lend support, with one more home game added to the schedule "against either Duluth or Milwaukee" the following week.

The bitingly cold winds of fall triumphed, with a "disappointing" trickle of fans coming to see the green-and-white take on the Milwaukee Badgers. One local newspaper estimated the paltry crowd at just 1,200. Another paper chalked up virtually the entire gate to the efforts of the local Elks Club to save the team through a presale of tickets.

A final decision on the future of the team was promised shortly.

== The financial crisis ==
Despite a passable league record of 5–3–3, 1925 proved to be a year of severe financial crisis for the Independents, with the local press noting that with a series sub-2,000 person home crowds "the management of the team has gone far down into debt." Expenses had been heavy and losses great for the team's sixth year in the National Football League. According to team secretary A.H. Bowlby and others, only "definite assurance of a paying proposition next year" would allow the team to take the field in Rock Island.

The roll of the dice would be on membership in a new league to rival the NFL — the American Football League, founded by jilted New York team owner Charlie Pyle as a vehicle for his New York Yankees, starring superstar halfback Red Grange.

== Roster ==
=== Linemen ===
Name	Age	Games	Starts	Height	Weight
Paul Anderson	23	1	0	6'0"	200
Lyle Burton	25	7	6	6'1"	195
Forrest Cotton	24	8	5	6'1"	195
George Dahlgren	38	1	0	5'10"	200
Frank DeClerk	25	6	1	5'9"	191
Ed Herman	23	1	1	5'10"	175
Louie Kolls	33	11	10	6'1"	205
Joe Little Twig	28	10	10	5'11"	183
Joe Rooney	27	10	9	6'0"	177
**Duke Slater**	27	11	11	6'1"	215
George Thompson	26	11	11	6'1"	210
Chet Widerquist	30	11	11	6'1"	219
Note: Excludes Clinton Legion game. Pro Football Hall of Fame members in **bold**.

=== Backs ===
Name	Age	Games	Starts	Height	Weight
Johnny Armstrong	28	11	8	5'8"	170
Les Belding	25	1	0	5'11"	195
Buck Gavin	34	5	5	5'10"	179
Harry Hall	23	1	1	5'11"	165
Dutch Hendrian	29	1	1	5'9"	182
Chuck Hill	21	1	1	5'8"	190
Jim Kendrick	32	1	1	6'0"	195
Roddy Lamb	26	9	8	5'6"	160
Vince McCarthy	25	4	2	5'10"	165
Eddie Novak	28	11	8	5'9"	175
Evar Swanson	23	2	1	5'9"	171
**Jim Thorpe**	38	2	2	6'1"	202
Rube Ursella	35	11	9	5'9"	172
Note: Excludes Clinton Legion game. Pro Football Hall of Fame members in **bold**.
