= 1925 Rochester Jeffersons season =

National Football League team season

- Head coach: Tex Grigg
- Home stadium: Traveling team

Results
- Record: 2–10–1 Overall; 0–6–1 NFL
- League place: T–16th in NFL

The 1925 Rochester Jeffersons season was their sixth and final season in the National Football League. The team improved on their previous record against league opponents of 0–7, losing only six games and logging a tie. They tied for sixteenth in the league.

The previous season saw the culmination of the team's low scoring output, but their woes only improved slightly during the 1925 season. Between 1922 and 1924, the team lost fifteen consecutive NFL games by a combined score of 360–13 (scoring only one touchdown for every 26 that their opponents scored). They were shut out during thirteen of these fifteen NFL games, including a six-game streak being outscored 179–0.

In 1925, though, their scoring output improved, being outscored by a margin of only 111–26. Despite the improvement both on offense and defense, the team finished without a victory for the fourth consecutive season. This streak of 23 games without a victory is topped only by 1976–77 Tampa Bay Buccaneers (26 consecutive losses).

== Background ==
During their six-year existence, the team had logged a record of 8–27–4, with only two victories against teams then in the NFL (45–0 over the Tonawanda Kardex, which turned out to be Tonawanda's only game in the NFL, and 27–13 over the Columbus Panhandles, both during the 1921 season). These two victories were the last the team would experience. The Jeffersons were unable to log a victory over any team currently in the NFL, going 0–5 against the Chicago Cardinals, Chicago Bears, Green Bay Packers, and New York Giants.

For the 1925 season, the Jeffersons were coached by Cecil "Tex" Grigg. Grigg also played on the team as a kicker while simultaneously coaching, successfully kicking two extra point attempts during the season. These were his only kicking attempts in his career. The 1925 season was his only year coaching, but Grigg did continue his playing days for two more seasons, one with the New York Giants and one with the Frankford Yellow Jackets. He would go on to play as a running back and scored five touchdowns in his career, including an interception return.

The team, one of the fourteen original teams in the National Football League, ceased operations after the 1925 season. Owner Leo Lyons, one of the founders of the NFL, ran out of money when the Jeffersons failed to draw sufficient crowds to attend their games. Because of a league-sanctioned suspension of operations, the team was still technically in existence through the 1926 and 1927 seasons, but Lyons allowed the franchise to expire on September 15, 1928, nearly three years after the team had played its last game.

== Schedule ==
| Game | Date | Opponent | Result | Record | Venue | Attendance | Recap | Sources |
|---|---|---|---|---|---|---|---|---|
| 1 | September 27 | at Canton Bulldogs | L 7–14 | 0–1 | League Field | | Recap | |
| 2 | October 4 | at Buffalo Bisons | T 0–0 | 0–1–1 | Bison Stadium | 5,000 | Recap | |
| – | October 10 | at Albany | W 17–3 | — | | | — | |
| – | October 11 | at Atlantic City | W 3–0 | — | | | — | |
| – | October 18 | at Waterbury Blues | L 6–7 | — | | | — | |
| 3 | October 25 | at Green Bay Packers | L 13–33 | 0–2–1 | City Stadium | 2,700 | Recap | |
| 4 | November 1 | at Providence Steam Roller | L 0–17 | 0–3–1 | Cycledrome | | Recap | |
| – | November 8 | at Hartford Blues | L 6–8 | — | | | — | |
| 5 | November 11 | at New York Giants | L 0–13 | 0–4–1 | Polo Grounds | 10,000 | Recap | |
| 6 | November 15 | at Pottsville Maroons | L 6–14 | 0–5–1 | Minersville Park | | Recap | |
| 7 | November 22 | at Detroit Panthers | L 0–20 | 0–6–1 | Navin Field | | Recap | |
| – | November 29 | at Atlantic City Blue Tornadoes | L 6–7 | — | | | — | |
| – | December 6 | at Atlantic City Blue Tornadoes | L 0–6 | — | | | — | |
Note: Games in italics are against non-NFL teams.

== Standings ==
NFL standings
| | W | L | T | PCT | PF | PA | STK |
|---|---|---|---|---|---|---|---|
| Chicago Cardinals * | 11 | 2 | 1 | .846 | 229 | 65 | W2 |
| Pottsville Maroons * | 10 | 2 | 0 | .833 | 270 | 45 | W5 |
| Detroit Panthers | 8 | 2 | 2 | .800 | 129 | 39 | W1 |
| Akron Pros | 4 | 2 | 2 | .667 | 65 | 51 | L2 |
| New York Giants | 8 | 4 | 0 | .667 | 122 | 67 | W1 |
| Frankford Yellow Jackets | 13 | 7 | 0 | .650 | 190 | 169 | W2 |
| Chicago Bears | 9 | 5 | 3 | .643 | 158 | 96 | W3 |
| Rock Island Independents | 5 | 3 | 3 | .625 | 99 | 58 | L1 |
| Green Bay Packers | 8 | 5 | 0 | .615 | 151 | 110 | W1 |
| Providence Steam Roller | 6 | 5 | 1 | .545 | 111 | 101 | L1 |
| Canton Bulldogs | 4 | 4 | 0 | .500 | 50 | 73 | L1 |
| Cleveland Bulldogs | 5 | 8 | 1 | .385 | 75 | 135 | L1 |
| Kansas City Cowboys | 2 | 5 | 1 | .286 | 65 | 97 | W1 |
| Hammond Pros | 1 | 4 | 0 | .200 | 23 | 87 | L3 |
| Buffalo Bisons | 1 | 6 | 2 | .143 | 33 | 113 | L4 |
| Duluth Kelleys | 0 | 3 | 0 | .000 | 6 | 25 | L3 |
| Rochester Jeffersons | 0 | 6 | 1 | .000 | 26 | 111 | L5 |
| Milwaukee Badgers | 0 | 6 | 0 | .000 | 7 | 191 | L6 |
| Dayton Triangles | 0 | 7 | 1 | .000 | 3 | 84 | L7 |
| Columbus Tigers | 0 | 9 | 0 | .000 | 28 | 124 | L9 |

Note: Tie games were not officially counted in the standings until 1972.
* The Pottsville Maroons were suspended from the league in December,
and the Chicago Cardinals named the NFL champions.
