= 1925 Cleveland Bulldogs season =

National Football League team season

- Head coach: Cap Edwards
- Home stadium: Dunn Field

Results
- Record: 5–8–1 NFL; 7–9–1 Overall
- League place: 12th NFL

The 1925 Cleveland Bulldogs season was their third in the league. The team failed to improve on their previous output of 7–1–1, winning only five league games. They finished twelfth in the league. The team also played in the first Wednesday game in league history, a 22–13 loss to the Detroit Panthers.

The Bulldogs' Thanksgiving Day game against the Kansas City Cowboys was played in Hartford, Connecticut. The Bulldogs were the designated home team.

Fullback Doc Elliott of the Bulldogs (left) plunges the line against the New York Giants, November 1, 1925.

== Schedule ==
Game	Date	Opponent	Result	Record	Venue	Attendance	Recap	Sources
–	September 20	at Toronto Tigers	L 0–6	—	Kilgus Field		—	
1	September 27	at Akron Pros	L 0–7	0–1	General Field	1,500	Recap	
2	October 4	Columbus Tigers	W 3–0	1–1	Dunn Field	4,000	Recap	
3	October 11	Kansas City Cowboys	W 16–13	2-1	Dunn Field		Recap	
4	October 18	at Chicago Bears	L 0–7	2–2	Cubs Park		Recap	
5	November 1	at New York Giants	L 0–19	2–3	Polo Grounds	18,000	Recap	
6	November 8	at Canton Bulldogs	L 0–6	2–4	Lakeside Park	2,000	Recap	
7	November 11	at Detroit Panthers	L 13–22	2–5	Navin Field		Recap	
8	November 21	at Frankford Yellow Jackets	W 14–0	3–5	Frankford Stadium	7,000	Recap	
9	November 22	at Pottsville Maroons	L 6–24	3–6	Minersville Park		Recap	
10	November 26	Kansas City Cowboys	L 0–17	3–7	Clarkin Field	1,000	Recap	
–	November 28	at Atlantic City Roses	W 12–0	—	Bader Field		—	
11	November 29	at Providence Steam Roller	T 7–7	3–7–1	Cycledrome	7,000	Recap	
12	December 6	Canton Bulldogs	W 6–0	4–7–1	Dunn Field		Recap	
13	December 12	at Frankford Yellow Jackets	W 3–0	5–7–1	Frankford Stadium	7,000	Recap	
–	December 13	at Hartford Blues	W 13–6	—	Clarkin Field		—	
14	December 20	Frankford Yellow Jackets	L 7–13	5–8–1	Dunn Field	1,000	Recap	
Note: Games in italics were against non-NFL teams. Armistice Day: Wednesday, November 11. Thanksgiving Day: November 26.

== Standings ==
NFL standings
	W	L	T	PCT	PF	PA	STK
Chicago Cardinals *	11	2	1	.846	229	65	W2
Pottsville Maroons *	10	2	0	.833	270	45	W5
Detroit Panthers	8	2	2	.800	129	39	W1
Akron Pros	4	2	2	.667	65	51	L2
New York Giants	8	4	0	.667	122	67	W1
Frankford Yellow Jackets	13	7	0	.650	190	169	W2
Chicago Bears	9	5	3	.643	158	96	W3
Rock Island Independents	5	3	3	.625	99	58	L1
Green Bay Packers	8	5	0	.615	151	110	W1
Providence Steam Roller	6	5	1	.545	111	101	L1
Canton Bulldogs	4	4	0	.500	50	73	L1
Cleveland Bulldogs	5	8	1	.385	75	135	L1
Kansas City Cowboys	2	5	1	.286	65	97	W1
Hammond Pros	1	4	0	.200	23	87	L3
Buffalo Bisons	1	6	2	.143	33	113	L4
Duluth Kelleys	0	3	0	.000	6	25	L3
Rochester Jeffersons	0	6	1	.000	26	111	L5
Milwaukee Badgers	0	6	0	.000	7	191	L6
Dayton Triangles	0	7	1	.000	3	84	L7
Columbus Tigers	0	9	0	.000	28	124	L9

Note: Tie games were not officially counted in the standings until 1972.
* The Pottsville Maroons were suspended from the league in December,
and the Chicago Cardinals named the NFL champions.
