= 1925 Kansas City Cowboys season =

National Football League team season

- Head coach: Roy Andrews
- Home stadium: Traveling team

Results
- Record: 2–5–1
- League place: 13th NFL

The 1925 Kansas City Cowboys season was their second in the National Football League (NFL) and first as the Cowboys, having played the previous season as the Kansas City Blues. The team improved on their previous output of 2–7, losing only five games. They finished thirteenth in the league.

== Schedule ==
Week	Date	Opponent	Result	Record	Venue
1	September 27	at Duluth Kelleys	W 3–0	1–0	Duluth Athletic Park
2	October 4	at Akron Pros	L 7–14	1–1	General Field
3	October 11	at Cleveland Bulldogs	L 13–16	1–2	Dunn Field
4	October 18	at Chicago Cardinals	L 7–20	1–3	Comiskey Park
5	October 25	at Rock Island Independents	T 3–3	1–3–1	Douglas Park
—	Bye				
—	Bye				
6	November 15	at Rock Island Independents	L 12–35	1–4–1	Douglas Park
7	November 22	at New York Giants	L 3–9	1–5–1	Polo Grounds
8	November 26	at Cleveland Bulldogs	W 17–0	2–5–1	Clarkin Field

== Standings ==
NFL standings
	W	L	T	PCT	PF	PA	STK
Chicago Cardinals *	11	2	1	.846	229	65	W2
Pottsville Maroons *	10	2	0	.833	270	45	W5
Detroit Panthers	8	2	2	.800	129	39	W1
Akron Pros	4	2	2	.667	65	51	L2
New York Giants	8	4	0	.667	122	67	W1
Frankford Yellow Jackets	13	7	0	.650	190	169	W2
Chicago Bears	9	5	3	.643	158	96	W3
Rock Island Independents	5	3	3	.625	99	58	L1
Green Bay Packers	8	5	0	.615	151	110	W1
Providence Steam Roller	6	5	1	.545	111	101	L1
Canton Bulldogs	4	4	0	.500	50	73	L1
Cleveland Bulldogs	5	8	1	.385	75	135	L1
Kansas City Cowboys	2	5	1	.286	65	97	W1
Hammond Pros	1	4	0	.200	23	87	L3
Buffalo Bisons	1	6	2	.143	33	113	L4
Duluth Kelleys	0	3	0	.000	6	25	L3
Rochester Jeffersons	0	6	1	.000	26	111	L5
Milwaukee Badgers	0	6	0	.000	7	191	L6
Dayton Triangles	0	7	1	.000	3	84	L7
Columbus Tigers	0	9	0	.000	28	124	L9

Note: Tie games were not officially counted in the standings until 1972.
* The Pottsville Maroons were suspended from the league in December,
and the Chicago Cardinals named the NFL champions.
