= 1925 Chicago Bears season =

NFL team season

- Program for the Nov. 15 Panthers game.
- Owner: George S. Halas, Dutch Sternaman
- Head coach: George Halas
- Home stadium: Cubs Park

Results
- Record: 9–5–3 (NFL); 19–7–3 (overall)
- League place: 7th NFL

The 1925 Chicago Bears season was their sixth regular season completed in the National Football League. The team was unable to improve on their 6–1–4 record from 1924 and finished with a 9–5–3 record under head coach George Halas earning them a seventh-place finish in the team standings, their worst showing to that date. However, the 1925 Bears were the most notable team in the young NFL's history to that point all because of the addition of college players, including Red Grange.

Including a 9-game barnstorming season that ran through the end of January 1926, the 1925 Bears played a grueling slate of 29 games, a total never equaled before or since.

== Background ==
During the fall, Bears owners George Halas and Edward Sternaman reached an agreement with C. C. Pyle to sign Illinois Fighting Illini football star Red Grange, a deal that included organizing a barnstorming tour that spanned 19 games and 67 days. As part of their agreement, the Bears received 50 percent of the ticket gate, while Pyle and Grange got the other half. The negotiations took longer than the Bears owners had expected, with Halas recalling in 1967 that he and Sternaman "figured that a middle-aged small-town theater operator who wore spats might not prove too tough a negotiator for a couple of bright young extra football executives from Chicago. But then again, we had also made other mistakes."

On November 22, after the Illini season ended, Grange formally announced his intention to sign with the Bears. That same day, he attended the Bears' 21–0 win over the Packers.

== Schedule ==
Game	Date	Opponent	Result	Record	Venue	Attendance	Recap	Sources
1	September 20	at Rock Island Independents	T 0–0	0–0–1	Douglas Park	3,500	Recap	
2	September 27	at Green Bay Packers	L 10–14	0–1–1	City Stadium	5,389	Recap	
3	October 4	at Detroit Panthers	T 0–0	0–1–2	Navin Field	3,342	Recap	
4	October 11	Hammond Pros	W 28–7	1–1–2	DePaul Field		Recap	
5	October 18	Cleveland Bulldogs	W 7–0	2–1–2	Cubs Park		Recap	
6	October 25	at Chicago Cardinals	L 0–9	2–2–2	Comiskey Park	13,000	Recap	
7	November 1	Rock Island Independents	W 6–0	3–2–2	Cubs Park	8,000	Recap	
8	November 8	Frankford Yellow Jackets	W 19–0	4–2–2	Cubs Park	5,000	Recap	
9	November 15	Detroit Panthers	W 14–0	5–2–2	Cubs Park	6,200	Recap	
10	November 22	Green Bay Packers	W 21–0	6–2–2	Cubs Park	6,898	Recap	
11	November 26	Chicago Cardinals	T 0–0	6–2–3	Cubs Park	31,180	Recap	
12	November 29	Columbus Tigers	W 14–13	7–2–3	Cubs Park	25,285	Recap	
—	December 2	Donnelly All-Stars	W 39–6	—	Sportsman's Park	5,032	—	
13	December 5	at Frankford Yellow Jackets	W 14–7	8–2–3	Shibe Park	25,408	Recap	
14	December 6	at New York Giants	W 19–7	9–2–3	Polo Grounds	70,000	Recap	
—	December 8	Washington All-Stars	W 17–3	—	Washington, D.C.	5,000	—	
15	December 9	at Providence Steam Roller	L 6–9	9–3–3	Braves Field	15,000	Recap	
—	December 10	Pittsburgh All-Stars	L 24–0	—	Forbes Field	4,498	—	
16	December 12	at Detroit Panthers	L 0–21	9–4–3	Navin Field	4,111	Recap	
17	December 13	New York Giants	L 0–9	9–5–3	Cubs Park	15,000	Recap	
Note: Games in italics was against non-NFL team. Thanksgiving Day: November 26.

== Season recap ==
Red Grange's 4-touchdown, 146-yard performance against the hastily organized "Donnelly All-Stars" in St. Louis on December 2 set the stage for a lucrative month for the "Galloping Ghost of Football" and the Bears.

The Bears started slow, just like in 1924, opening the season with two ties and a loss to Green Bay (the Packers' first win ever over the Bears). The Bears regrouped, however, and won 6 of their next 7.

Grange made his NFL debut in the Bears' Thanksgiving Day game against the Chicago Cardinals on November 26. An estimated 40,000 attended what ended in a scoreless tie. In the next game against the Columbus Tigers, Grange threw a touchdown pass as the Bears won 14–13. Shortly after, the Bears signed Grange's Illinois teammate Earl Britton.

Between December 2 and December 13, the Bears played an astounding eight games, during which the team lived in a special railway car, with its women's restroom converted into a makeshift training room. The first game was against the Donnelly All-Stars, a team sponsored by a local mortician, at Sportsman's Park in St. Louis. The Bears won 39–6, though only 8,000 attended due to poor weather and being played on a Wednesday. This was followed by a two-touchdown day by Grange, including the game winner in a 14–7 defeat of the Frankford Yellow Jackets.

Immediately after the Yellow Jackets game, the Bears boarded the train to New York, still wearing their dirtied uniforms; when the players noticed their gear, Pyle told Halas, "This tour will make you so wealthy, Halas, that next year you'll be able to afford two sets of uniforms." On December 6, Grange and the Bears played the New York Giants at the Polo Grounds; Giants owner Tim Mara had attempted to sign Grange, and after that failed, he instead secured a game with the Bears. Although the Giants lost 7–19, the game attracted nearly 70,000 fans and saved the team from financial ruin.

From New York, the team traveled to Washington, D.C. to take on an all-star team. Before their game, the Bears – accompanied by Illinois Senator William B. McKinley – visited President Calvin Coolidge who greeted them, "Glad to meet you. I always did like animal acts." The Bears defeated Washington 19–0 with Sternaman, Johnny Bryan, and Frank Hanny scoring touchdowns.

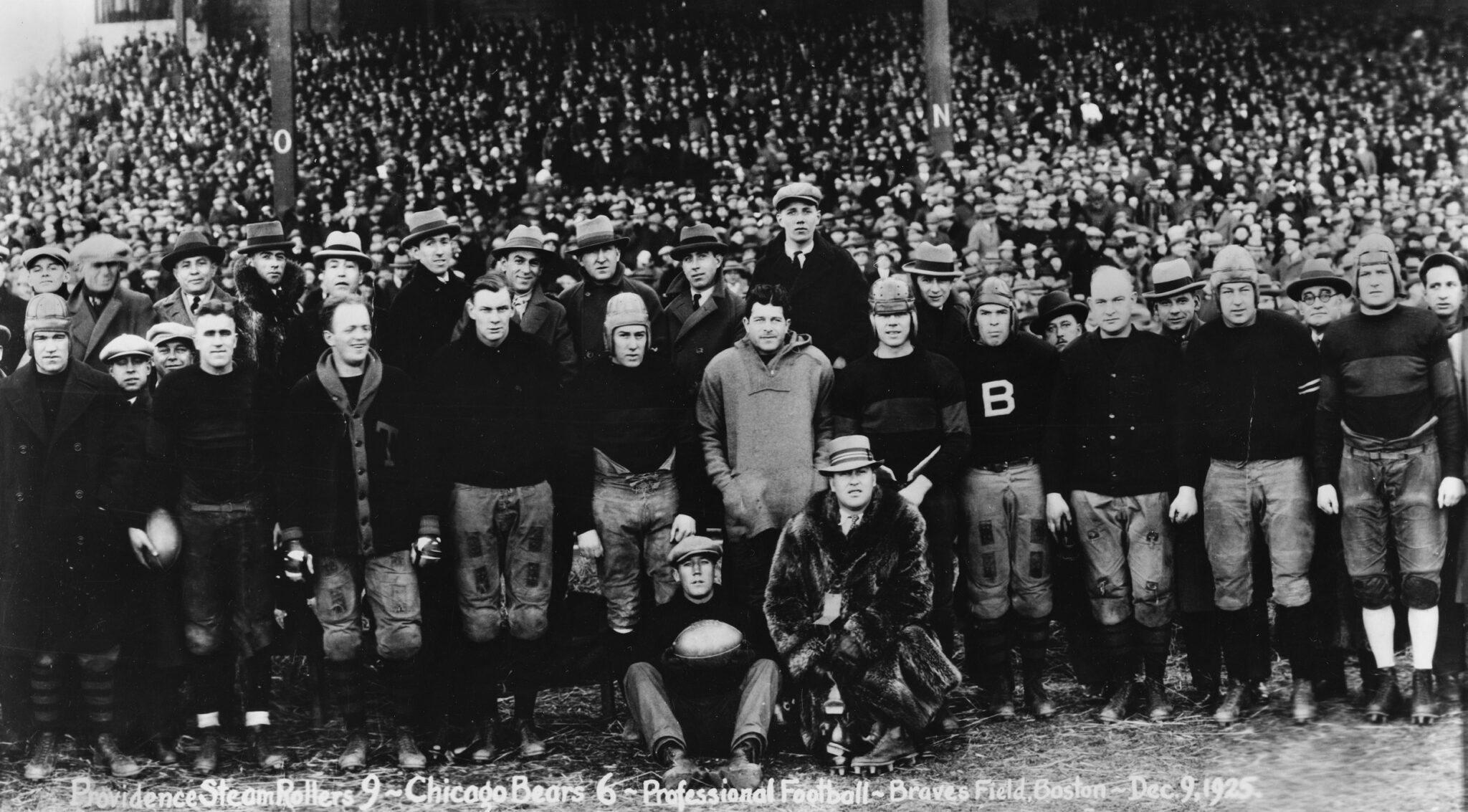
The Bears and the expansion Providence Steam Roller played the first NFL game ever in Boston on December 9, 1925. The game was won by Providence, 9–6.

Despite the victories, the demanding schedule led to an increase in injuries, including Grange who was hit in the left arm during the Giants game, causing it to swell by the team's next game against the Providence Steam Roller in Boston. The pain from the injury was too much for Grange, who struggled to return a punt and allowed it to sail over his head. In addition to allowing a safety, Hanny lost a fumble that was returned for a touchdown, while Bryan scored the Bears' lone points in the 9–6 win.

Before their next game against an all-star team in Pittsburgh, former All-American Bo McMillin visited the Bears in the locker room and advised Grange to not play upon seeing his arm. At kickoff, only ten players were available, forcing Halas to choose between center George Trafton and tackle Ed Healey to serve as the required 11th man; Trafton, who was able to at least stand and walk, was reluctantly called to action. Trainer Andy Lotshaw, who had never played football before, was also ordered to play tackle; Grange remarked, "He played about half a game before they killed him. Not literally of course." Twelve minutes into the game, Grange attempted to block for halfback Johnny Mohardt, but tore a ligament and ruptured a blood vessel in his arm, the latter of which resulted in artery hemorrhaging. With Grange out, the Bears lost 24–0. His injury prompted the Bears to cancel a game against the Cleveland All-Stars, leading to the game organizer suing for breach of contract.

Grange missed the following game against the expansion Detroit Panthers after a blood clot developed in his arm. Nevertheless, he joined his teammates at the stadium and was greeted by fans at halftime. Some $18,000 had been paid out in refunds when it was announced that Grange was not expected to play in the game due to his injury. In front of a crowd of just 4,111, he watched from the sideline as his team was shut out once again 21–0.

On December 13, the Bears returned to Chicago to host the Giants, but with Grange still out, many canceled their ticket reservations and only 18,000 watched as the Bears lost 9–0. "No other team before or since has ever attempted such a grueling schedule as the 1925 Bears and I'm sure never will," Grange wrote in his 1953 autobiography. Grange had some success in this season, scoring three touchdowns overall. Still, the star of the team was Joe Sternaman who scored six touchdowns, threw for three more, and added three field goals and 18 PATs. Sternaman scored 72 of the Bears' 158 points.

== Standings ==
NFL standings
	W	L	T	PCT	PF	PA	STK
Chicago Cardinals *	11	2	1	.846	230	65	W2
Pottsville Maroons *	10	2	0	.833	270	45	W5
Detroit Panthers	8	2	2	.800	129	39	W1
Akron Pros	4	2	2	.667	65	51	L2
New York Giants	8	4	0	.667	122	67	W1
Frankford Yellow Jackets	13	7	0	.650	190	169	W2
Chicago Bears	9	5	3	.643	158	96	W3
Rock Island Independents	5	3	3	.625	99	58	L1
Green Bay Packers	8	5	0	.615	151	110	W1
Providence Steam Roller	6	5	1	.545	111	101	L1
Canton Bulldogs	4	4	0	.500	50	73	L1
Cleveland Bulldogs	5	8	1	.385	75	135	L1
Kansas City Cowboys	2	5	1	.286	65	97	W1
Hammond Pros	1	4	0	.200	23	87	L3
Buffalo Bisons	1	6	2	.143	33	113	L4
Duluth Kelleys	0	3	0	.000	6	25	L3
Rochester Jeffersons	0	6	1	.000	26	111	L5
Milwaukee Badgers	0	6	0	.000	7	191	L6
Dayton Triangles	0	7	1	.000	3	84	L7
Columbus Tigers	0	9	0	.000	28	124	L9

Note: Tie games were not officially counted in the standings until 1972.
* The Pottsville Maroons were suspended from the league in December,
and the Chicago Cardinals named the NFL champions.

== January barnstorming tour ==
The following attendance figures and gate numbers were first published in 2019 by historian Chris Willis in his book Red Grange: The Life and Legacy of the NFL's First Superstar.

Date	Opponent	Result	Venue	Attendance	Total Gate	Sources
December 25, 1925	Coral Gables Collegians	W 7–0	Coral Gables, Florida	8,000	$29,726	
January 1, 1926	Tampa Cardinals	W 17–2	Plant Field	8,000	—	
January 2, 1926	Jacksonville All-Stars	W 19–6	Jacksonville, Florida	6,700	—	
January 10, 1926	Southern All-Stars	W 14–0	New Orleans, Louisiana	4,533	$12,213	
January 16, 1926	Los Angeles Tigers	W 17–7	LA Memorial Coliseum	75,000	$144,557	
January 17, 1926	San Diego All-Stars	W 14–0	San Diego, California	5,482	$7,678	
January 24, 1926	San Francisco Tigers	L 9–14	San Francisco, California	17,060	$40,858	
January 30, 1926	Portland All-Stars	W 60–3	Portland, Oregon	3,254	$6,285	
January 31, 1926	Seattle All-Stars	W 34–0	Seattle, Washington	3,837	$7,137	

At the end of the 1925 season, the Bears embarked on a barnstorming tour, playing games in Florida, Louisiana, California and Washington, usually against local pick-up teams. To avoid further injuries like in December, the team held week-long breaks between stretches in which they played games on consecutive days. The Bears' roster, which typically carried 18 players, grew to 21 for the tour with additions like quarterback Richard Vick, halfback Harold Erickson, end Paul Goebel, tackle Roy Lyman, and center Ralph Claypool. The team left for Florida on December 21, traveling in a Pullman train car called "Bethulla" that the players nicknamed "Dog House". Pyle also hired a porter to carry their luggage and arranged for matching sweaters. The train arrived in Miami two days later, from which they went to Coral Gables, Florida for a banquet attended by alumni from the University of Illinois.

Halfback Harold "Red" Grange, shown here on a 1926 premium card from a signature football, was the first national superstar of the NFL.

Prior to their Christmas Day game against the Coral Gables All-Stars, Halas, Sternaman, and Pyle visited the game site and noticed it was merely a field of sand. To their surprise, a group of 200 carpenters quickly began constructing a temporary 25,000-seat stadium; however, the poor field conditions led Halas to contact New York for new cleats. Britton, who also played kicker, received a new pair of shoes which he argued would not help him; although he had two 50-yard punts in the game, he subsequently reverted to his original footwear. The Bears won 7–0 with Grange scoring on a two-yard touchdown in front of just 8,000 (tickets were $20, over five times more expensive than an NFL game at the time). The stadium was demolished the next day.

On January 1, 1926, the Bears played the Tampa Cardinals in Plant Field; the Cardinals were led by Jim Thorpe, who decided to participate despite being 41, and featured several members of the NFL's Rock Island Independents. Thorpe struggled with fumbles as Grange and Sternaman scored in the Bears' 17–3 win. The next day, the Bears defeated a Jacksonville team featuring former Stanford All-American Ernie Nevers by a score of 19–6, with Grange throwing two touchdown passes, one of which went for 30 yards to Verne Mullen. Mullen was also involved in a fight with a Jacksonville player that sparked a brawl before teammates and police intervened.

After resting for a week, the team departed for New Orleans, though Halas' wife Minnie, daughter Virginia, and son George Jr. decided to return to Chicago. "My brother had been born that September 1925, and [the tour] was just before my third birthday, so I don't have any real memories," Virginia recalled in 2019. "But I have heard many stories about the traveling on the train with my mother and her sister, my aunt. And we went as far as Florida and then decided, my mother decided we would go home and not make the trip to California."

In New Orleans, a Southern-based all-star team led by former Tulane captain Lester Lautenschlager hosted the Bears. Grange scored a touchdown and recorded 136 rushing yards in a 14–0 shutout victory. From there, the Bears went westward to play the Los Angeles Wildcats, led by Washington Huskies football star and Grange admirer George "Wildcat" Wilson, who agreed to join as they offered the chance to play against him. In front of 65,000 fans at the Los Angeles Memorial Coliseum, Grange and Joey Sternaman scored for the Bears in the 17–7 win, while Roy Baker recorded the Wildcats' lone touchdown. According to game organizer P. S. Halbriter, gate receipts amounted to nearly $135,000, including $50,000 to Grange.

The following day, the California Stars hosted the Bears on a high school field in San Diego. Chicago struck first with Oscar Knop's touchdown, while Grange added a score of his own in the fourth quarter for a 14–0 win. A day after the game, baseball's Pacific Coast League president Tom Turner announced his intentions to attract Grange and the Bears to Portland for a game later in the month.

After another week of rest, the team went to Kezar Stadium in San Francisco to play Wilson's San Francisco Tigers. Despite being betting favorites, the Bears fell behind as the Tigers' James Bradshaw recorded two interceptions, while his teammates Bob Fitzke and Houston Stockton scored. Sternaman threw a touchdown pass to Paul Gobel as the Bears fell 14–7.

On January 30–31, Grange and his team visited the Pacific Northwest to play all-star teams in Portland and Seattle, both led by Wilson. Wilson had agreed to play provided he be paid in advance and game organizers gave him a strong offensive line; he described the Bears as having "the biggest and best line I ever saw on a football field." As such, his teammates for the games consisted of players from the Waterfront Athletic Club who also worked as longshoremen.

In Portland, with a "small but highly critical crowd" of between 5,000 and 6,500 watching, Grange and Britton combined for five touchdowns, including three by the latter, en route to a 60–3 blowout. However, Grange left the game before halftime after suffering an injury in a pile-up; Wilson also did the same.

Chicago wrapped up the barnstorming tour in Seattle. Grange recorded a rushing and passing touchdown in the first half, while Wilson injured his right leg during the second quarter while trying to tackle him. Seattle's Rollie Corbett broke his leg in the game, leading to Grange, Pyle, and Wilson setting up a fund to support him for which they donated $50 apiece. The Bears won 34–0.

The Bears ended the tour with an 8–1 record. Grange was richly rewarded for his rookie year in professional football, netting salary and bonuses totaling nearly $125,000 — far more than any individual player had ever received.

== Roster ==
=== Future Hall of Fame players ===
- Red Grange, back (rookie from Illinois)
- George Halas, end
- Ed Healey, tackle
- George Trafton, center

=== Other leading players ===
- Hunk Anderson, guard
- Ed Sternaman, back
- Joe Sternaman, quarterback
- Laurie Walquist, quarterback
