= 1925 Akron Pros season =

National Football League team season

- Head coach: Scotty Bierce
- Home stadium: League Park

Results
- Record: 4–2–2
- Division place: 6th NFL
- Playoffs: No playoffs until 1932

The 1925 Akron Pros season marked their sixth year in the National Football League (NFL) and last season before renaming as the Indians. The team improved on their previous output of 2–6 by winning four games. They finished sixth in the league.

== Schedule ==
| Week | Date | Opponent | Result | Record | Venue | Attendance | Recap | Sources |
|---|---|---|---|---|---|---|---|---|
| 1 | September 27 | Cleveland Bulldogs | W 7–0 | 1–0 | General Field | 1,500 | Recap | |
| 2 | October 4 | Kansas City Cowboys | W 14–7 | 2–0 | General Field | | Recap | |
| 3 | October 11 | at Buffalo Bisons | T 0–0 | 2–0–1 | Bison Stadium | 3,500 | Recap | |
| 4 | October 18 | at Canton Bulldogs | W 20–3 | 3–0–1 | Lakeside Park | 5,000 | Recap | |
| 5 | October 25 | at Detroit Panthers | T 0–0 | 3–0–2 | Navin Field | 5,400 | Recap | |
| 6 | November 1 | Dayton Triangles | W 17–3 | 4–0–2 | General Field | 2,500 | Recap | |
| 7 | November 7 | at Frankford Yellow Jackets | L 7–17 | 4–1–2 | Frankford Stadium | 12,000 | Recap | |
| 8 | November 8 | at Pottsville Maroons | L 0–21 | 4–2–2 | Minersville Park | | Recap | |

== Standings ==
NFL standings
| | W | L | T | PCT | PF | PA | STK |
|---|---|---|---|---|---|---|---|
| Chicago Cardinals * | 11 | 2 | 1 | .846 | 229 | 65 | W2 |
| Pottsville Maroons * | 10 | 2 | 0 | .833 | 270 | 45 | W5 |
| Detroit Panthers | 8 | 2 | 2 | .800 | 129 | 39 | W1 |
| Akron Pros | 4 | 2 | 2 | .667 | 65 | 51 | L2 |
| New York Giants | 8 | 4 | 0 | .667 | 122 | 67 | W1 |
| Frankford Yellow Jackets | 13 | 7 | 0 | .650 | 190 | 169 | W2 |
| Chicago Bears | 9 | 5 | 3 | .643 | 158 | 96 | W3 |
| Rock Island Independents | 5 | 3 | 3 | .625 | 99 | 58 | L1 |
| Green Bay Packers | 8 | 5 | 0 | .615 | 151 | 110 | W1 |
| Providence Steam Roller | 6 | 5 | 1 | .545 | 111 | 101 | L1 |
| Canton Bulldogs | 4 | 4 | 0 | .500 | 50 | 73 | L1 |
| Cleveland Bulldogs | 5 | 8 | 1 | .385 | 75 | 135 | L1 |
| Kansas City Cowboys | 2 | 5 | 1 | .286 | 65 | 97 | W1 |
| Hammond Pros | 1 | 4 | 0 | .200 | 23 | 87 | L3 |
| Buffalo Bisons | 1 | 6 | 2 | .143 | 33 | 113 | L4 |
| Duluth Kelleys | 0 | 3 | 0 | .000 | 6 | 25 | L3 |
| Rochester Jeffersons | 0 | 6 | 1 | .000 | 26 | 111 | L5 |
| Milwaukee Badgers | 0 | 6 | 0 | .000 | 7 | 191 | L6 |
| Dayton Triangles | 0 | 7 | 1 | .000 | 3 | 84 | L7 |
| Columbus Tigers | 0 | 9 | 0 | .000 | 28 | 124 | L9 |

Note: Tie games were not officially counted in the standings until 1972.
* The Pottsville Maroons were suspended from the league in December,
and the Chicago Cardinals named the NFL champions.
