= 1925 Providence Steam Roller season =

National Football League team season

- Owner: E.D. Copping
- Head coach: Archie Golembeski
- Home stadium: Cyclodome

Results
- Record: 7–5–1 Overall; 6–5–1 NFL
- League place: 10th in NFL

The 1925 Providence Steam Roller season was their inaugural season in the National Football League. The team finished with a 6–5–1 record against NFL teams, finishing tenth in the league.

== Schedule ==
Game	Date	Opponent	Result	Record	Venue	Attendance	Recap	Sources
—	September 20	West Point Field Artillery	W 127–0	—	Cycledrome		—	
—	September 27	New London Submarine Base	(scheduled)	—	Cycledrome		—	
1	October 3	at Frankford Yellow Jackets	L 0–7	0–1	Frankford Stadium	12,000	Recap	
2	October 4	at Pottsville Maroons	W 6–0	1–1	Minersville Park	5,000	Recap	
3	October 11	New York Giants	W 14–0	2–1	Cycledrome	7,500	Recap	
4	October 18	Pottsville Maroons	L 0–34	2–2	Cycledrome	10,000	Recap	
5	November 1	Rochester Jeffersons	W 17–0	3–2	Cycledrome		Recap	
6	November 8	Buffalo Bisons	W 10–0	4–2	Cycledrome	2,200	Recap	
7	November 15	at New York Giants	L 12–13	4–3	Polo Grounds	25,000	Recap	
8	November 22	Frankford Yellow Jackets	W 20–7	5–3	Cycledrome	14,000	Recap	
9	November 29	Cleveland Bulldogs	T 7–7	5–3–1	Cycledrome	12,000	Recap	
10	December 6	Green Bay Packers	L 10–13	5–4–1	Cycledrome	7,000	Recap	
11	December 9	Chicago Bears	W 9–6	6–4–1	Braves Field	15,000	Recap	
12	December 13	Frankford Yellow Jackets	L 6–14	6–5–1	Cycledrome		Recap	
Note: Games in italics are against non-NFL teams.

== Standings ==
NFL standings
	W	L	T	PCT	PF	PA	STK
Chicago Cardinals *	11	2	1	.846	229	65	W2
Pottsville Maroons *	10	2	0	.833	270	45	W5
Detroit Panthers	8	2	2	.800	129	39	W1
Akron Pros	4	2	2	.667	65	51	L2
New York Giants	8	4	0	.667	122	67	W1
Frankford Yellow Jackets	13	7	0	.650	190	169	W2
Chicago Bears	9	5	3	.643	158	96	W3
Rock Island Independents	5	3	3	.625	99	58	L1
Green Bay Packers	8	5	0	.615	151	110	W1
Providence Steam Roller	6	5	1	.545	111	101	L1
Canton Bulldogs	4	4	0	.500	50	73	L1
Cleveland Bulldogs	5	8	1	.385	75	135	L1
Kansas City Cowboys	2	5	1	.286	65	97	W1
Hammond Pros	1	4	0	.200	23	87	L3
Buffalo Bisons	1	6	2	.143	33	113	L4
Duluth Kelleys	0	3	0	.000	6	25	L3
Rochester Jeffersons	0	6	1	.000	26	111	L5
Milwaukee Badgers	0	6	0	.000	7	191	L6
Dayton Triangles	0	7	1	.000	3	84	L7
Columbus Tigers	0	9	0	.000	28	124	L9

Note: Tie games were not officially counted in the standings until 1972.
* The Pottsville Maroons were suspended from the league in December,
and the Chicago Cardinals named the NFL champions.
