= 1925 Frankford Yellow Jackets season =

National Football League team season

- Head coach: Guy Chamberlin
- Home stadium: Frankford Stadium

Results
- Record: 15–7 Overall; 13–7 NFL
- League place: 6th NFL

The 1925 Frankford Yellow Jackets season was their second in the National Football League. The team improved on their previous output of 11–2–1, winning thirteen league games to finish the season in sixth place. The team's overall record, against league and non-league opponents in 1925 was 15–7.

The team set the record for most games played in a season during the years before the league went to a fixed-length schedule, playing an astonishing 22-game season, including two contests against non-NFL opponents. Three Frankford players (Rae Crowther, Tex Hamer, and Bill Hoffman) played in 19 of 20 regular season league games — a record that still stands.

Even counting playoff games, no NFL team played more than 20 games in a season until the 2021 NFL season when the Cincinnati Bengals and Los Angeles Rams each played 21 games including 17 regular-season games and 4 playoff games on their way to Super Bowl LVI. The Yellow Jackets' +21 point differential was the lowest by a team with a minimum of 13 wins, until the 2022 Minnesota Vikings came around, with a 13–4 record and a -3 point differential.

== Schedule ==
Game	Date	Opponent	Result	Record	Venue	Attendance	Recap	Sources
–	September 20	at All-New Britain	W 6–0	—	Willow Brook Park	4,000	—	
1	September 26	Buffalo Bisons	W 27–7	1–0	Frankford Stadium	15,000	Recap	
2	October 3	Providence Steam Roller	W 7–0	2–0	Frankford Stadium	8,000	Recap	
3	October 10	Canton Bulldogs	W 12–7	3–0	Frankford Stadium	15,000	Recap	
4	October 11	at Detroit Panthers	L 0–3	3–1	Navin Field	3,400	Recap	
5	October 17	New York Giants	W 5–3	4–1	Frankford Stadium	15,000	Recap	
6	October 18	at New York Giants	W 14–0	5–1	Polo Grounds	27,000	Recap	
7	October 24	Dayton Triangles	W 3–0	6–1	Frankford Stadium	2,000	Recap	
8	October 31	Columbus Tigers	W 19–0	7–1	Frankford Stadium	5,000	Recap	
9	November 1	at Buffalo Bisons	W 12–3	8–1	Bison Stadium	8,000	Recap	
10	November 7	Akron Pros	W 17–7	9–1	Frankford Stadium	12,000	Recap	
11	November 8	at Chicago Bears	L 0–19	9–2	Cubs Park	5,000	Recap	
12	November 14	Pottsville Maroons	W 20–0	10–2	Frankford Stadium	15,000	Recap	
13	November 21	Cleveland Bulldogs	L 0–14	10–3	Frankford Stadium	7,000	Recap	
14	November 22	at Providence Steam Roller	L 7–20	10–4	Cycledrome	14,000	Recap	
–	November 26	All-New Britain	W 7–0	—	Frankford Stadium	15,000	—	
15	November 28	Green Bay Packers	W 13–7	11–4	Frankford Stadium	10,000	Recap	
16	November 29	at Pottsville Maroons	L 0–49	11–5	Minersville Park	9,000	Recap	
17	December 5	Chicago Bears	L 7–14	11–6	Shibe Park	36,000	Recap	
18	December 12	Cleveland Bulldogs	L 0–3	11–7	Frankford Stadium	7,000	Recap	
19	December 13	at Providence Steam Roller	W 14–6	12–7	Cycledrome		Recap	
20	December 20	at Cleveland Bulldogs	W 13–7	13–7	Dunn Field	1,000	Recap	
Note: Games in italics are against non-NFL teams. Thanksgiving Day: November 26.

== Standings ==
NFL standings
	W	L	T	PCT	PF	PA	STK
Chicago Cardinals *	11	2	1	.846	229	65	W2
Pottsville Maroons *	10	2	0	.833	270	45	W5
Detroit Panthers	8	2	2	.800	129	39	W1
Akron Pros	4	2	2	.667	65	51	L2
New York Giants	8	4	0	.667	122	67	W1
Frankford Yellow Jackets	13	7	0	.650	190	169	W2
Chicago Bears	9	5	3	.643	158	96	W3
Rock Island Independents	5	3	3	.625	99	58	L1
Green Bay Packers	8	5	0	.615	151	110	W1
Providence Steam Roller	6	5	1	.545	111	101	L1
Canton Bulldogs	4	4	0	.500	50	73	L1
Cleveland Bulldogs	5	8	1	.385	75	135	L1
Kansas City Cowboys	2	5	1	.286	65	97	W1
Hammond Pros	1	4	0	.200	23	87	L3
Buffalo Bisons	1	6	2	.143	33	113	L4
Duluth Kelleys	0	3	0	.000	6	25	L3
Rochester Jeffersons	0	6	1	.000	26	111	L5
Milwaukee Badgers	0	6	0	.000	7	191	L6
Dayton Triangles	0	7	1	.000	3	84	L7
Columbus Tigers	0	9	0	.000	28	124	L9

Note: Tie games were not officially counted in the standings until 1972.
* The Pottsville Maroons were suspended from the league in December,
and the Chicago Cardinals named the NFL champions.
