= Al Hadden =

American football player (1899–1969)

Aldous Bernard Haddon
Profile
- Position: E/FB/HB/QB

Personal information
- Born: November 8, 1899; Toledo, Ohio, U.S.
- Died: February 1969 (aged 69)
- Listed height: 5 ft 9 in (1.75 m)
- Listed weight: 186 lb (84 kg)

Career information
- College: Washington & Jefferson College

Career history
- Detroit Panthers (1925–26); Providence Steam Roller (1927); Chicago Bears (1928); Providence Steam Roller (1928–30)
- Stats at Pro Football Reference

Aldous Bernard Hadden (November 8, 1899 – February 1969) was an American professional football player for the Detroit Panthers, Providence Steam Roller, and Chicago Bears. He attended Washington & Jefferson College.

== Notes ==
- Career statistics from NFL.com · Pro Football Reference ·
