= Les Haws =

American football player (1899–1966)

- Haws, circa 1923

No. 9, 2
- Position: Back

Personal information
- Born: November 28, 1899; Ardmore, Pennsylvania, U.S.
- Died: January 20, 1966 (aged 66); Norristown, Pennsylvania, U.S.
- Listed height: 5 ft 8 in (1.73 m)
- Listed weight: 165 lb (75 kg)

Career information
- High school: Lower Merion (Ardmore)
- College: Dartmouth

Career history
- Frankford Yellow Jackets (1924–1925)
- Stats at Pro Football Reference

Harvey Lester Haws (November 28, 1899 – January 20, 1966) was an American professional football back who played for the Frankford Yellow Jackets of the National Football League (NFL). He played college football for the Dartmouth Indians. He led the NFL in yards-per-carry in 1924.

== Early life ==
Harvey Lester Haws was born on November 28, 1899, in Ardmore, Pennsylvania. He was a high school football "star" at Lower Merion High School in Ardmore.

== College career ==
In 1920, Haws enrolled at Dartmouth College to play college football for the Indians. He was on the freshman team in 1920 and played well. However, he started to lose confidence and did not play for the varsity team until the 1923 season, when new head coach Jesse Hawley became impressed with Haws. On October 27, 1923, Haws became the first Dartmouth player to score a touchdown against Harvard in 16 years. He ended the season with a school single-season record 68 points (eight touchdowns, one field goal, and 17 extra points).

== Professional career ==
Haws started all 13 games for the Frankford Yellow Jackets of the National Football League (NFL) in 1924, rushing 61 times for 503 yards and three touchdowns while also catching 10 passes for 207 yards and one touchdown. His 8.2 yards-per-carry and 10.0 yards-per-touch were both the highest in the NFL that year. He also finished second in the league in rushing yards and all-purpose yards (710). The Yellow Jackets finished the year in third place in the NFL with an 11–2–1 record. Haws played in 13 of 20 games (starting eight) for Frankford in 1925, recording 38 carries for 191 yards and one touchdown.

== Post-playing career ==
Haws was the backfield coach at Temple from 1926 to 1929. On October 11, 1927, it was reported that Haws had been placed in temporary charge of Temple's preparations for their game against Dartmouth on October 15, 1927, due to Temple head coach Heinie Miller being called away due to his sister's death. Haws resigned after the 1929 season to focus more on his law practice. He died on January 20, 1966, in Norristown, Pennsylvania.
