= 1925 Hammond Pros season =

Sporting season

- Head coach: Fritz Pollard and Doc Young
- Home stadium: Traveling team

Results
- Record: 1–5 Overall; 1–4 NFL
- League place: 14th NFL

The 1925 Hammond Pros season was their sixth in the National Football League (NFL). The team failed to improve on their previous record against league opponents of 2–2–1, winning only one game. They finished fourteenth in the league.

== Background ==
After having completed just 5 NFL games during the 1924 season, all of which were played on the road, Hammond went into 1925 with a light schedule of just five games, front-loaded to the first half of the season. A very tentative home game was also scheduled for November 8 against the Dayton Triangles. The proposed home game would have been the first since early in the 1923 season, when a game was played against Dayton at Hammond's Turner Field.

In the end, the ill-fated November 8 was rescheduled as a road date against the Rock Island Independents but was canceled due to snow.

A game was initially scheduled against the Racine Legion at Racine, Wisconsin was canceled when that American Legion-sponsored team suspended operations for 1925. Instead a game was scheduled for the open date and played with the non-NFL Toronto Tigers of Toronto, Ohio, with Hammond losing the contest in a 7–0 shutout.

== Schedule ==
Game	Date	Opponent	Result	Record	Venue	Attendance	Recap	Sources
1	September 20	at Green Bay Packers	L 0–14	0–1	City Stadium	3,000	Recap	
2	September 27	at Chicago Cardinals	W 10–6	1–1	Normal Park		Recap	
–	October 4	at Racine Legion	Canceled due to franchise hiatus					
–	October 4	at Toronto Tigers	L 0–7	—	Kilgus Field	2,500	—	
3	October 11	at Chicago Bears	L 7–28	1–2	DePaul Field		Recap	
4	November 1	at Detroit Panthers	L 6–26	1–3	Navin Field		Recap	
–	November 8	at Rock Island Independents	Canceled due to snow					
5	December 12	at Chicago Cardinals	L 0–13	1–4	Comiskey Park		Recap	
Note: Game in italics was against a non-NFL team.

== Standings ==
NFL standings
	W	L	T	PCT	PF	PA	STK
Chicago Cardinals *	11	2	1	.846	230	65	W2
Pottsville Maroons *	10	2	0	.833	270	45	W5
Detroit Panthers	8	2	2	.800	129	39	W1
Akron Pros	4	2	2	.667	65	51	L2
New York Giants	8	4	0	.667	122	67	W1
Frankford Yellow Jackets	13	7	0	.650	190	169	W2
Chicago Bears	9	5	3	.643	158	96	W3
Rock Island Independents	5	3	3	.625	99	58	L1
Green Bay Packers	8	5	0	.615	151	110	W1
Providence Steam Roller	6	5	1	.545	111	101	L1
Canton Bulldogs	4	4	0	.500	50	73	L1
Cleveland Bulldogs	5	8	1	.385	75	135	L1
Kansas City Cowboys	2	5	1	.286	65	97	W1
Hammond Pros	1	4	0	.200	23	87	L3
Buffalo Bisons	1	6	2	.143	33	113	L4
Duluth Kelleys	0	3	0	.000	6	25	L3
Rochester Jeffersons	0	6	1	.000	26	111	L5
Milwaukee Badgers	0	6	0	.000	7	191	L6
Dayton Triangles	0	7	1	.000	3	84	L7
Columbus Tigers	0	9	0	.000	28	124	L9

Note: Tie games were not officially counted in the standings until 1972.
* The Pottsville Maroons were suspended from the league in December,
and the Chicago Cardinals named the NFL champions.
