= 1925 Milwaukee Badgers season =

National Football League team season

- Head coach: Johnny Bryan
- Home stadium: Athletic Park

Results
- Record: 0–7 Overall; 0–6 NFL
- League place: T-16th in NFL

The 1925 Milwaukee Badgers season was their fourth in the National Football League. The team failed to improve on their previous league record of 5–8, losing all their games. They tied for sixteenth place in the league.

The end of the Badgers’ season was centered on a team scandal with the Chicago Cardinals. The scandal involved a Chicago player, Art Folz, hiring a group of high school football players to play for the Milwaukee Badgers, against the Cardinals. This would ensure an inferior opponent for Chicago. The game was used to help prop up their win-loss percentage and as a chance of wrestling away the 1925 Championship away from the first place Pottsville Maroons. When NFL President Joseph Carr learned high school players had been used in a league game, he told reporters the 59–0 Cardinals win would be stricken from the record. However, the league had never got around to removing it and the game is still a part of the NFL records. Cardinals' owner Chris O'Brien was also fined $1,000 by Carr for allowing his team play a game against high schoolers, even though O'Brien claimed that he was unaware of the players' status. Finally Badgers' owner, Ambrose McGuirk, was ordered to sell his Milwaukee franchise within 90 days. Folz, for his role, was barred from football for life.

However, by the summer of 1926, the $1,000 fine against O'Brien was rescinded, probably since the amount would have put the Cardinals out of business. McGuirk though had already sold his Badgers franchise to Johnny Bryan, a fullback with the Chicago Bears. Two of the high school football players used in scandal even earned high school all-star recognition at the end of their season. Art Folz reportedly told the high schoolers that the game was a "practice game" and would in no part affect their amateur status.

The scandal did have implications for the 1925 NFL Championship, when the Pottsville Maroons had their title removed by the NFL for playing in an unsanctioned game against the Notre Dame All-Stars. To this day, Pottsville residents and supporters still demand to know why Chicago was awarded the title even though they too were found by Carr to have violated the NFL's rules.

== Schedule ==
Week	Date	Opponent	Result	Record
1	October 4	at Chicago Cardinals	**L** 0–34	0–1
2	October 11	at Green Bay Packers	**L** 0–31	0–2
–	October 11	at Toronto Tigers	**L** 7–13	
3	November 1	Green Bay Packers	**L** 0–6	0–3
4	November 8	at Detroit Panthers	**L** 0–21	0–4
5	November 22	at Rock Island Independents	**L** 7–40	0–5
6	December 10	at Chicago Cardinals	**L** 0–59	0–6

- Game in italics was against a non-NFL team.
- Game in **bold** signify the 1925 Chicago Cardinals – Milwaukee Badgers scandal.

== Standings ==
NFL standings
	W	L	T	PCT	PF	PA	STK
Chicago Cardinals *	11	2	1	.846	229	65	W2
Pottsville Maroons *	10	2	0	.833	270	45	W5
Detroit Panthers	8	2	2	.800	129	39	W1
Akron Pros	4	2	2	.667	65	51	L2
New York Giants	8	4	0	.667	122	67	W1
Frankford Yellow Jackets	13	7	0	.650	190	169	W2
Chicago Bears	9	5	3	.643	158	96	W3
Rock Island Independents	5	3	3	.625	99	58	L1
Green Bay Packers	8	5	0	.615	151	110	W1
Providence Steam Roller	6	5	1	.545	111	101	L1
Canton Bulldogs	4	4	0	.500	50	73	L1
Cleveland Bulldogs	5	8	1	.385	75	135	L1
Kansas City Cowboys	2	5	1	.286	65	97	W1
Hammond Pros	1	4	0	.200	23	87	L3
Buffalo Bisons	1	6	2	.143	33	113	L4
Duluth Kelleys	0	3	0	.000	6	25	L3
Rochester Jeffersons	0	6	1	.000	26	111	L5
Milwaukee Badgers	0	6	0	.000	7	191	L6
Dayton Triangles	0	7	1	.000	3	84	L7
Columbus Tigers	0	9	0	.000	28	124	L9

Note: Tie games were not officially counted in the standings until 1972.
* The Pottsville Maroons were suspended from the league in December,
and the Chicago Cardinals named the NFL champions.
