= Tex Hamer =

American football player (1901–1981)

No. 14, 3, 2
- Position: Fullback

Personal information
- Born: October 4, 1901; Junction, Texas, U.S.
- Died: May 9, 1981 (aged 79); Dallas, Texas, U.S.
- Listed height: 6 ft 1 in (1.85 m)
- Listed weight: 191 lb (87 kg)

Career information
- High school: San Antonio (TX) Military Academy
- College: Penn

Career history
- Frankford Yellow Jackets (1924–1927)

Awards and highlights
- NFL champion (1926); 2× GB Press-Gazette: 2nd team all-NFL (1924, 1925); Colliers Eye Mag.: 1st team all-NFL (1924); Colliers Eye Mag.: 2nd team all-NFL (1925); Chicago Tribune: 2nd team all-NFL (1926)
- Stats at Pro Football Reference

Ernest Alexander "Tex" Hamer (October 4, 1901 – May 9, 1981) was an American professional football player for the Frankford Yellow Jackets from 1924 until 1927. Hamer won the 1926 NFL championship with the Yellow Jackets.

== College career ==
He played college football at University of Pennsylvania. In 1922 he was named captain of the Quakers football team. On October 15, 1922, Hamer threw two touchdown passes to Carl Ertresvaag resulting in a 12–0 Quakers win over the University of Maryland, College Park.

== Professional career ==
Hamer played for the Frankford Yellow Jackets from 1924 to 1926 and finished with 19 rushing TDs, including 12 in 1924.

In 1924 against the Providence Steamroller, Hamer threw an 18-yard pass to Les Haws for a touchdown for a 21–10 Yellow Jackets win. In a rematch of the two teams Hamer scored off of a short run in the third quarter, then ran for a 35-yard touchdown run in the final period to clinch a 16–3 win. On Thanksgiving Day 1926, Hamer scored a touchdown on the Yellow Jackets’ first possession against the Green Bay Packers for a 20–14 Frankford win In 1926, Hamer kicked an extra point to give the Jackets a 7–6 win over the Detroit Panthers.

== Boxing ==
He was also a professional boxer winning 4 matches (3 by knockout) while losing 3 matches (all by knockout).
