= 1925 Pottsville Maroons season =

National Football League team season

- Owner: J.G. Stringel
- Head coach: Dick Rauch
- Home stadium: Minersville Park

Results
- Record: 10–2 (NFL); 13–2 (overall)
- League place: 2nd NFL

The 1925 Pottsville Maroons season was their inaugural season in the National Football League. The team finished a 10–2 league record and a 13–2 overall record. The team initially won the 1925 NFL championship, however a controversial suspension cost them the title, forcing the team to finish in second place.

== Schedule ==
Game	Date	Opponent	Result	Record	Venue	Attendance	Recap	Sources
–	September 20	Colwyn Darby	W 48–0	—	Minersville Park		—	
1	September 27	Buffalo Bisons	W 28–0	1–0	Minersville Park	3,500	Recap	
2	October 4	Providence Steam Roller	L 0–6	1–1	Minersville Park	5,000	Recap	
3	October 11	Canton Bulldogs	W 28–0	2–1	Minersville Park		Recap	
4	October 18	at Providence Steam Roller	W 34–0	3–1	Cycledrome	7,500	Recap	
5	November 1	Columbus Tigers	W 20–0	4–1	Minersville Park	3,000	Recap	
6	November 8	Akron Pros	W 21–0	5–1	Minersville Park		Recap	
7	November 14	at Frankford Yellow Jackets	L 0–20	5-2	Frankford Stadium	15,000	Recap	
8	November 15	Rochester Jeffersons	W 14–6	6–2	Minersville Park		Recap	
9	November 22	Cleveland Bulldogs	W 24–6	7–2	Minersville Park		Recap	
10	November 26	Green Bay Packers	W 31–0	8–2	Minersville Park	3,500	Recap	
11	November 29	Frankford Yellow Jackets	W 49–0	9–2	Minersville Park	9,000	Recap	
12	December 6	at Chicago Cardinals	W 21–7	10–2	Comiskey Park	5,000	Recap	
–	December 12	Notre Dame All-Stars	W 9–7	—	Shibe Park		—	
–	December 20	at Atlantic City Roses	W 6–0	—			—	
Note: Games in italics are against non-NFL teams.

== Standings ==
NFL standings
	W	L	T	PCT	PF	PA	STK
Chicago Cardinals *	11	2	1	.846	229	65	W2
Pottsville Maroons *	10	2	0	.833	270	45	W5
Detroit Panthers	8	2	2	.800	129	39	W1
Akron Pros	4	2	2	.667	65	51	L2
New York Giants	8	4	0	.667	122	67	W1
Frankford Yellow Jackets	13	7	0	.650	190	169	W2
Chicago Bears	9	5	3	.643	158	96	W3
Rock Island Independents	5	3	3	.625	99	58	L1
Green Bay Packers	8	5	0	.615	151	110	W1
Providence Steam Roller	6	5	1	.545	111	101	L1
Canton Bulldogs	4	4	0	.500	50	73	L1
Cleveland Bulldogs	5	8	1	.385	75	135	L1
Kansas City Cowboys	2	5	1	.286	65	97	W1
Hammond Pros	1	4	0	.200	23	87	L3
Buffalo Bisons	1	6	2	.143	33	113	L4
Duluth Kelleys	0	3	0	.000	6	25	L3
Rochester Jeffersons	0	6	1	.000	26	111	L5
Milwaukee Badgers	0	6	0	.000	7	191	L6
Dayton Triangles	0	7	1	.000	3	84	L7
Columbus Tigers	0	9	0	.000	28	124	L9

Note: Tie games were not officially counted in the standings until 1972.
* The Pottsville Maroons were suspended from the league in December,
and the Chicago Cardinals named the NFL champions.
