= 1925 Chicago Cardinals season =

American football team season

- Head coach: Norman Barry
- Home stadium: Comiskey Park, Normal Park

Results
- Record: 12–2–1 Overall; 11–2–1 NFL
- League place: 1st NFL

The 1925 Chicago Cardinals season marked the sixth year of the club in the National Football League (NFL). Playing all of their games in the city of Chicago, the team finished with a record of 12–2–1, tops in the league in terms of winning percentage. In an attempt to ensure a league championship, the Cardinals played a hastily scheduled game against a new club, the Milwaukee Badgers, who included several high school students among its ranks, resulting in a contested championship. The 59–0 game was supposed to be erased from the record books but never was.

The Pottsville Maroons, who defeated the Cardinals in league play, were ostensibly the champions of 1925, but their title was stripped when the team was suspended from the NFL in December. The Cardinals were instead proclaimed 1925 champions — a decision that remains controversial among football historians.

== Season history ==
=== Milwaukee scandal ===
Star halfback Paddy Driscoll carries the ball around end in the season-opener for the Cards against the visiting team from Harvey, Illinois.

The end of the Cardinals season was centered on two historic, but controversial, situations. The first was a team scandal with the Milwaukee Badgers. The scandal involved a Chicago player, Art Folz, hiring a group of high school football players to play for the Milwaukee Badgers, against the Cardinals. This would ensure an inferior opponent for Chicago. The game was used to help prop up their win–loss percentage and as a chance of wresting the 1925 championship away from the first place Pottsville Maroons.

When NFL president Joe Carr learned high school players had been used in a league game, he told reporters the 59–0 Cardinals win would be stricken from the record. However, the league had never got around to removing it and the game is still a part of the NFL records. Cardinals' owner Chris O'Brien was also fined $1,000 by Carr for allowing his team play a game against high schoolers, even though O'Brien claimed that he was unaware of the players' status. Finally Badgers' owner, Ambrose McGuirk, was ordered to sell his Milwaukee franchise within 90 days. Folz, for his role, was barred from football for life.

By the summer of 1926, the $1,000 fine against O'Brien was rescinded, probably since the amount would have put the Cardinals out of business. McGuirk though had already sold his Badgers franchise to Johnny Bryan, a fullback with the Chicago Bears. Two of the high school football players used in scandal even earned high school all-star recognition at the end of their season. Art Folz reportedly told the high schoolers that the game was a "practice game" and would in no part affect their amateur status.

=== Pottsville controversy ===
The Milwaukee scandal did have implications for the 1925 NFL Championship and the second controversy. In December 1925, the Pottsville Maroons had their title removed by the NFL and given to the Cardinals for playing in an unsanctioned game against the Notre Dame All-Stars. To this day, Pottsville residents and supporters still demand to know why Chicago was awarded the title even though they too were found by Carr to have violated the NFL's rules. According to Bob Carroll of the Professional Football Researchers Association, "The Cardinals didn't defy the league", Carroll said. "Pottsville did. It was a great team, but the owner made a mistake." However, it is still not entirely known if O'Brien knew of the high school players on the Badgers team.

For his part, Cardinals owner Chris O'Brien refused to accept the championship title for his team. At the owners' meeting after the season was over, he argued that his team did not deserve to take the title over a team which had beaten them fairly. It appears that his reasons for scheduling the Milwaukee and Hammond games had been not to take the title, but rather to convince the cross-town Chicago Bears to play his team again – the Bears, with Red Grange in their roster, were a very lucrative draw. The NFL said it would revisit the issue later, but never did. It was only later, under the ownership of Charles Bidwill and his son Bill Bidwill, that the Cardinals began claiming the championship title.

== Regular season ==
Game	Date	Opponent	Result	Record	Venue	Attendance	Recap	Sources
–	September 20	Harvey, Illinois	W 14–6	1–0	Normal Park		—	
1	September 27	Hammond Pros	L 6–10	1–1	Normal Park		Recap	
2	October 4	Milwaukee Badgers	W 34–0	2–1	Normal Park	2,500	Recap	
3	October 11	Columbus Tigers	W 19–9	3–1	Normal Park		Recap	
4	October 18	Kansas City Cowboys	W 20–7	4–1	Comiskey Park		Recap	
5	October 25	Chicago Bears	W 9–0	5–1	Comiskey Park	13,000	Recap	
6	November 1	Duluth Kelleys	W 10–6	6–1	Comiskey Park		Recap	
7	November 8	Green Bay Packers	W 9–6	7–1	Comiskey Park	3,000	Recap	
8	November 15	Buffalo Bisons	W 23–6	8–1	Comiskey Park	4,000	Recap	
9	November 22	Dayton Triangles	W 14–0	9–1	Comiskey Park	3,000	Recap	
10	November 26	at Chicago Bears	T 0–0	9–1–1	Cubs Park	39,000	Recap	
11	November 29	Rock Island Independents	W 7–0	10–1–1	Comiskey Park	3,000	Recap	
12	December 6	Pottsville Maroons	L 7–21	10–2–1	Comiskey Park	5,000	Recap	
13	December 10	Milwaukee Badgers	W 59–0	11–2–1	Normal Park		Recap	
14	December 12	Hammond Pros	W 13–0	12–2–1	Comiskey Park		Recap	
Note: Game in italics was against a non-NFL team. Thanksgiving: Nov. 26.

== Standings ==
NFL standings
	W	L	T	PCT	PF	PA	STK
Chicago Cardinals *	11	2	1	.846	229	65	W2
Pottsville Maroons *	10	2	0	.833	270	45	W5
Detroit Panthers	8	2	2	.800	129	39	W1
Akron Pros	4	2	2	.667	65	51	L2
New York Giants	8	4	0	.667	122	67	W1
Frankford Yellow Jackets	13	7	0	.650	190	169	W2
Chicago Bears	9	5	3	.643	158	96	W3
Rock Island Independents	5	3	3	.625	99	58	L1
Green Bay Packers	8	5	0	.615	151	110	W1
Providence Steam Roller	6	5	1	.545	111	101	L1
Canton Bulldogs	4	4	0	.500	50	73	L1
Cleveland Bulldogs	5	8	1	.385	75	135	L1
Kansas City Cowboys	2	5	1	.286	65	97	W1
Hammond Pros	1	4	0	.200	23	87	L3
Buffalo Bisons	1	6	2	.143	33	113	L4
Duluth Kelleys	0	3	0	.000	6	25	L3
Rochester Jeffersons	0	6	1	.000	26	111	L5
Milwaukee Badgers	0	6	0	.000	7	191	L6
Dayton Triangles	0	7	1	.000	3	84	L7
Columbus Tigers	0	9	0	.000	28	124	L9

Note: Tie games were not officially counted in the standings until 1972.
* The Pottsville Maroons were suspended from the league in December,
and the Chicago Cardinals named the NFL champions.
