= 1925 Buffalo Bisons (NFL) season =

National Football League team season

1925 Buffalo Bisons season
- Head coach: Walt Koppisch
- Home stadium: Bison Stadium

Results
- Record: 2–6–2 Overall; 1–6–2 NFL
- Division place: 15th NFL

The 1925 Buffalo Bisons season was their sixth in the league. The team failed to improve on their previous record against league opponents of 6–5, winning one game. They finished fifteenth in the league.

This was the first season since 1917 that star player Tommy Hughitt did not take the field for Buffalo; he had retired at the end of the previous season.

== Schedule ==
Week	Date	Opponent	Result	Record	Venue	Attendance	Recap	Sources
–	September 20	at North Tonawanda Frontiers	W 35–0	—	Felton Field		—	
1	September 26	at Frankford Yellow Jackets	L 7–27	0–1	Frankford Stadium	15,000	Recap	
2	September 27	at Pottsville Maroons	L 0–28	0–2	Minersville Park	3,500	Recap	
3	October 4	Rochester Jeffersons	T 0–0	0–2–1	Bison Stadium	5,000	Recap	
4	October 11	Akron Pros	T 0–0	0–2–2	Bison Stadium	3,500	Recap	
5	October 18	Columbus Tigers	W 17–6	1–2–2	Bison Stadium	4,500	Recap	
6	November 1	Frankford Yellow Jackets	L 3–12	1–3–2	Bison Stadium	8,000	Recap	
7	November 3	at New York Giants	L 0–7	1–4–2	Polo Grounds	20,000	Recap	
8	November 8	at Providence Steam Roller	L 0–10	1–5–2	Cycledrome	2,200	Recap	
9	November 15	at Chicago Cardinals	L 6–23	1–6–2	Comiskey Park	4,000	Recap	
Note: Game in italics against non-NFL team.

== Standings ==
NFL standings
	W	L	T	PCT	PF	PA	STK
Chicago Cardinals *	11	2	1	.846	229	65	W2
Pottsville Maroons *	10	2	0	.833	270	45	W5
Detroit Panthers	8	2	2	.800	129	39	W1
Akron Pros	4	2	2	.667	65	51	L2
New York Giants	8	4	0	.667	122	67	W1
Frankford Yellow Jackets	13	7	0	.650	190	169	W2
Chicago Bears	9	5	3	.643	158	96	W3
Rock Island Independents	5	3	3	.625	99	58	L1
Green Bay Packers	8	5	0	.615	151	110	W1
Providence Steam Roller	6	5	1	.545	111	101	L1
Canton Bulldogs	4	4	0	.500	50	73	L1
Cleveland Bulldogs	5	8	1	.385	75	135	L1
Kansas City Cowboys	2	5	1	.286	65	97	W1
Hammond Pros	1	4	0	.200	23	87	L3
Buffalo Bisons	1	6	2	.143	33	113	L4
Duluth Kelleys	0	3	0	.000	6	25	L3
Rochester Jeffersons	0	6	1	.000	26	111	L5
Milwaukee Badgers	0	6	0	.000	7	191	L6
Dayton Triangles	0	7	1	.000	3	84	L7
Columbus Tigers	0	9	0	.000	28	124	L9

Note: Tie games were not officially counted in the standings until 1972.
* The Pottsville Maroons were suspended from the league in December,
and the Chicago Cardinals named the NFL champions.
