= Tom Hogan (American football) =

American football player (1895–1937)

No. 10, 16, 7
- Positions: Tackle, Gunner, Center, End

Personal information
- Born: February 24, 1895; Holyoke, Massachusetts, U.S.
- Died: April 4, 1937 (aged 42); Detroit, Michigan, U.S.
- Listed height: 6 ft 2 in (1.88 m)
- Listed weight: 193 lb (88 kg)

Career information
- High school: Holyoke High School
- College: Detroit, Fordham

Career history
- Minneapolis Marines (1924); Detroit Lions (1925); Chicago Cardinals (1926)

Career statistics
- Games played: 17
- Games started: 8
- Touchdowns scored: 0
- Stats at Pro Football Reference

Thomas Francis Hogan (February 24, 1895 – April 4, 1937) was an American football player. He played in the National Football League from 1924 to 1926. He played as a lineman, having multiple positions.

== Early life and college career ==
Thomas Francis Hogan was born on February 24, 1895, in Holyoke, Massachusetts. He was at Holyoke High School, before enrolling himself at the University of Detroit Mercy, where he played for their football team in 1917. In 1918, he served in the United States Army in World War I. After, he played for their team again in 1919, before playing for Fordham in 1921.
