= 1925 Green Bay Packers season =

NFL team season

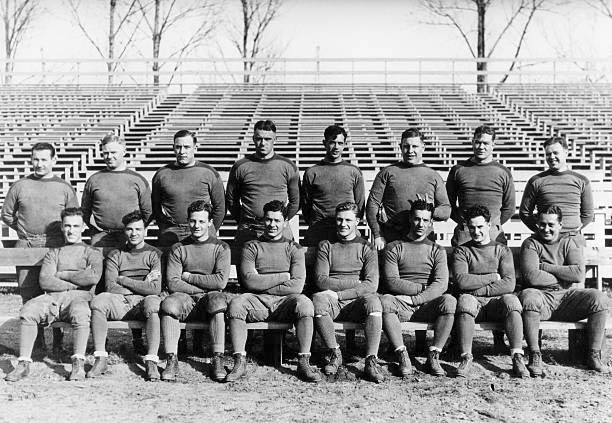
- Owner: Green Bay; Football Corporation
- Head coach: Curly Lambeau
- Home stadium: City Stadium

Results
- Record: 9–5 Overall; 8–5 NFL
- League place: 9th NFL

The 1925 Green Bay Packers season was their seventh season overall and their fifth season in the National Football League. The team finished with an 8–5 record under player/coach Curly Lambeau earning them a ninth-place finish. The season marked the first year the Packers played at City Stadium.

== Background ==
Work began on a new football stadium in July 1925, located in Green Bay at Joannes Park, just north of old Hagemeister Park, where the Packers played through 1924. Construction of the facility, featuring grandstands on both sides of the field and bleachers in the end zones, was completed in just eight weeks — just in time for a September 13 tune up game against the professional team from Iron Mountain, Michigan, located in that state's Upper Peninsula.

The new "City Stadium" was touted as having roomy seating and wide aisles for fan convenience, with "every seat in the park" said to offer "a splendid view of the gridiron." About half the city of Iron Mountain made the trek to Green Bay for the game, one reporter noted with only slight exaggeration, and the visitors received a hearty round of applause for their serpentine dance on the field at halftime. The debut contest proved to be a mismatch, however, with the Michiganders thoroughly drubbed by a score of 48 to 6, with the "Big Bay Blues" making effective use of the forward pass to move the ball up the field.

== Schedule ==
Week	Date	Opponent	Result	Record	Venue	Attendance	Recap	Sources
—	September 13	Iron Mountain	W 48–6	—	City Stadium	4,000	—	
1	September 20	Hammond Pros	W 14–0	1–0	City Stadium	3,000	Recap	
2	September 27	Chicago Bears	W 14–10	2–0	City Stadium	5,389	Recap	
3	October 4	at Rock Island Independents	L 0–3	2–1	Douglas Park	3,500	Recap	
4	October 11	Milwaukee Badgers	W 31–0	3–1	City Stadium	2,300	Recap	
5	October 18	Rock Island Independents	W 20–0	4–1	City Stadium	5,000	Recap	
6	October 25	Rochester Jeffersons	W 33–13	5–1	City Stadium	2,700	Recap	
7	November 1	at Milwaukee Badgers	W 6–0	6–1	Athletic Park	2,300	Recap	
8	November 8	at Chicago Cardinals	L 6–9	6–2	Comiskey Park	3,000	Recap	
9	November 15	Dayton Triangles	W 7–0	7–2	City Stadium	3,000	Recap	
10	November 22	at Chicago Bears	L 0–21	7–3	Wrigley Field	6,898	Recap	
11	November 26	at Pottsville Maroons	L 0–31	7–4	Minersville Park	3,500	Recap	
12	November 28	at Frankford Yellow Jackets	L 7–13	7–5	Frankford Stadium	10,000	Recap	
13	December 6	at Providence Steam Roller	W 13–10	8–5	Cycledrome	7,000	Recap	
Note: Game in italics is against non-NFL team. Thanksgiving Day: November 26.

== Standings ==
NFL standings
	W	L	T	PCT	PF	PA	STK
Chicago Cardinals *	11	2	1	.846	229	65	W2
Pottsville Maroons *	10	2	0	.833	270	45	W5
Detroit Panthers	8	2	2	.800	129	39	W1
Akron Pros	4	2	2	.667	65	51	L2
New York Giants	8	4	0	.667	122	67	W1
Frankford Yellow Jackets	13	7	0	.650	190	169	W2
Chicago Bears	9	5	3	.643	158	96	W3
Rock Island Independents	5	3	3	.625	99	58	L1
Green Bay Packers	8	5	0	.615	151	110	W1
Providence Steam Roller	6	5	1	.545	111	101	L1
Canton Bulldogs	4	4	0	.500	50	73	L1
Cleveland Bulldogs	5	8	1	.385	75	135	L1
Kansas City Cowboys	2	5	1	.286	65	97	W1
Hammond Pros	1	4	0	.200	23	87	L3
Buffalo Bisons	1	6	2	.143	33	113	L4
Duluth Kelleys	0	3	0	.000	6	25	L3
Rochester Jeffersons	0	6	1	.000	26	111	L5
Milwaukee Badgers	0	6	0	.000	7	191	L6
Dayton Triangles	0	7	1	.000	3	84	L7
Columbus Tigers	0	9	0	.000	28	124	L9

Note: Tie games were not officially counted in the standings until 1972.
* The Pottsville Maroons were suspended from the league in December,
and the Chicago Cardinals named the NFL champions.
