= List of Brooklyn Horsemen players =

This is a list of American football players who have played for the Brooklyn Horsemen in the first American Football League. It includes players that have played at least one match in the AFLI season. The Horsemen franchise was originally merged with the Brooklyn Lions of the National Football League in 1926.

| Name | Position | College |
|---|---|---|
| George Baldwin | Guard | Virginia |
| Shep Bingham | End | Yale |
| Jim Bolger | Back^{1} | St. Mary’s, St. Bonaventure |
| Paul Brennan | Guard^{2} | Fordham |
| Earl Britton | Back^{3} | Illinois |
| Ted Drews | End | Princeton |
| Jim Fitzgerald | Blocking Back^{4} | St. John's |
| Jim Flaherty | Wingback | Georgetown |
| Jim Frugone | Back^{1} | Syracuse |
| Hec Garvey^{5} | Tackle | Notre Dame |
| Ed Harrison | End | Boston College |
| Red Howard | Guard | New Hampshire, Princeton |
| Charlie Hummell | Tackle | Lafayette |
| Ed Hunsinger | End | Notre Dame |
| Bill Koelick | Tackle | none |
| Elmer Layden^{6} | Fullback | Notre Dame |
| Bob Nicholas | Tackle | Oglethorpe |
| Swede Olsen | Guard | none |
| Ted Plumridge | Center | Colgate, St. John's |
| Sheldon Pollock | Center | Lafayette |
| Leo Prendergast | Tackle^{2} | Lafayette |
| Dave Sehres | Wingback^{7} | New York University |
| Nate Share | Tackle | Tufts |
| Jack Sheely | Guard^{2} | New York University |
| Ray Smith | Back^{8} | Lebanon Valley |
| Harry Stuhldreher | Blocking Back | Notre Dame |
| Tarzan Taylor | Guard | Ohio State |

^{1} Played tailback and wingback
^{2} Also played center
^{3} Played fullback and tailback
^{4} Position later known as quarterback
^{5} Started season with Hartford Blues
^{6} Started season with Rock Island Independents
^{7} Also played end
^{8} Played tailback, wingback, and blocking back
