= Furlong Flynn =

American football player & aviation pioneer (1901-1977)

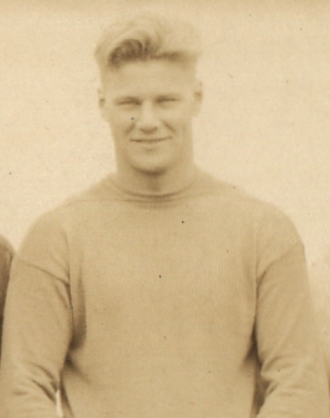
- Flynn with the Hartford Blues

No. 9
- Positions: Guard, tackle

Personal information
- Born: December 27, 1901; Waterford, New York, U.S.
- Died: November 1, 1977 (aged 75); Vernon, Connecticut, U.S.
- Listed height: 6 ft 0 in (1.83 m)
- Listed weight: 210 lb (95 kg)

Career information
- High school: St. Bernard's (New York)
- College: Cornell

Career history
- Hartford Blues (1926)

Awards and highlights
- National champion (1922)

Career NFL statistics
- Games played: 8
- Games started: 6
- Stats at Pro Football Reference

Furlonge Harold Flynn (December 27, 1901 – November 1, 1977) was an American football player and aviation pioneer. He played guard and tackle in the National Football League (NFL) with the Hartford Blues for one season after playing collegiate ball at Cornell.

== Early life and education ==
Flynn was born on December 27, 1901, in Waterford, New York. He attended St. Bernard's School. Flynn played college football at Cornell University, where he majored in mechanical engineering. He was one of their top guards during the 1922 season and was named a Walter Camp All-American. He was not selected to certain All-East teams, but was mentioned as "coming close to the top and failing [to make the team] ... only because there were so few places to fill." Herbert Reed, writer for the New York Evening Post, named Flynn to the All-Eastern honor roll following the season and gave Flynn a special mention in his report. A journalist for The Ithaca Journal wrote of him: "Flynn of Cornell I like especially in his big game because it was always possible for the backs to feel that they had a first down over him, and also because he could break out and support either side of the line on defense."

After just a single season of varsity football, Flynn left the Cornell squad in 1923.

== Professional career ==
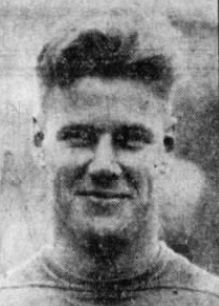
Flynn with Hartford

Shortly before the start of the 1926 NFL season, Flynn was signed by the Hartford Blues, despite being out of the sport for the prior three seasons. He appeared at the team's first practice, and spectators of the event "marveled" at how the 210-pound lineman could "spread himself about the field with so little effort." The Blues originally had him at right tackle.

The season began with an exhibition against the Brooklyn Naval Hospital on September 19, which the Blues won 33–7. Flynn did not see action in the match. At a practice held on September 23, Flynn played tackle on the first-team roster. A report in the Hartford Courant said the following: "Flynn, who has just joined the squad permanently, looks like the proper mate for [Ernie] McCann at the tackle post, although he will have to fight off the advances of none other than the former Notre Dame lineman and professional pugilist, and present day movie actor, Ed[sic] (Heck) Garvey of Holyoke, Mass. There will be plenty of room on the squad for Flynn if he carries his enthusiasm into the big schedule. Flynn is a Cornell man, having played in the line that opened the way for the great runs of Eddie Kaw and George Pfann in days gone by. He is a big, powerful boy and moves with exceptional alacrity for one carrying so much weight."

The regular season for Hartford began on September 26, as they faced the New York Giants in their first-ever game of NFL play. 6,500 fans attended the match, played at the East Hartford Velodrome. On the first play of the game, Giants guard Doc Alexander fumbled and Hartford recovered at the 30-yard line. It was the only high point for the Blues, as they failed a field goal attempt on their ensuing drive and finished the game without a single first down, as New York won 21–0. Flynn made an appearance as a substitute for left guard Elmer McCormick early in the game.

At practices held in the week following the Giants game, Hartford had Flynn play as the starting left guard. On October 1, the Blues traveled to Philadelphia, for their game with the Frankford Yellow Jackets on October 2. A total of 15,000 fans packed Frankford Stadium and saw the Yellow Jackets defeat Hartford 13–0. Flynn was the starting left guard for the Blues and was replaced by Stan Sieracki after a time.

When the game finished, both Frankford and the Blues caught trains heading to Hartford, where a second game between the two teams was played on October 3. Frankford won for the second consecutive time, this time by a score of 10–0. Flynn remained in his starting left guard position and "performed well in the line throughout, playing most of the game."

After cancelling a game with the Columbus Tigers scheduled for October 9, the Blues traveled to New York City to play the Brooklyn Lions at Ebbets Field on October 10. Before just 1,000 fans, the Blues lost their fourth straight game 0–6. Rather than play his usual left guard position, Flynn started at right tackle and Eddie Keenan took his place at left guard.

A game against the Providence Steamrollers scheduled for October 17 was canceled due to bad weather. The next game was on October 24, a rematch with the Brooklyn Lions. After Hec Garvey was unable to play, Flynn was named the starting tackle. Less than 1,000 fans showed up for the game, which was played in a cold rainstorm. Flynn was described as one of the "stars" of the game, a 16–6 win for Hartford which gave the Blues their first NFL victory.

Hartford's sixth regular season game of the 1926 season was played against the Kansas City Cowboys on October 31. Just 500 fans showed up to attend the contest, which was played in pouring rain. At midfield, the water was ankle-high and the ball floated whenever it fell there. The amount of mud made the yard lines impossible to see and the players "quickly became anonymous" in dirty jerseys. The game ended in a 2–7 loss for Hartford, with the Cowboys scoring the only touchdown of the game early, on a fumble caused by a slippery ball. Flynn started at left guard in the match.

On November 7, the Blues played against the Canton Bulldogs at their home field. The kickoff was originally scheduled for 2:15 p.m., but it was postponed to 2:45 p.m. because of a parade. The Bulldogs bus left late and were caught in a traffic jam, only arriving at 3:00 p.m. 4,000 fans waited impatiently at the East Hartford Velodrome. Due to the late start, the inadequate lights at the stadium (which only effected the track around the playing field) had to be turned on in the fourth quarter. It had become dark by this time, and fans spilled onto the field along the sidelines trying to follow the action. With a little less than ten minutes remaining, Hartford was winning 16–7. A fight broke out between fans after a darkness-inspired trick play by Canton, leading to the game being called with eight minutes left to play, making the Blues winners 16–7. Flynn saw significant action as starting right tackle in the game, before being replaced by Ernie McCann.

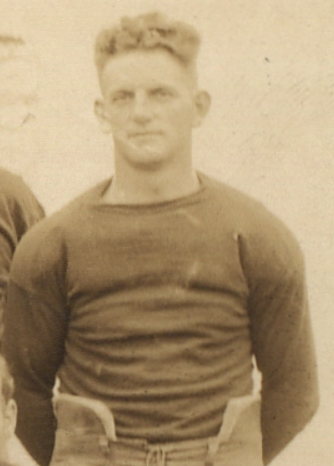
Dilly Dally, who filled in for the injured Flynn

The following game was played on November 14 against the Buffalo Rangers. An injury suffered in the match against the Bulldogs caused Flynn to only see brief action in the game, a 7–13 loss. Dilly Dally started in place of Flynn against the Rangers. Flynn later came into the game as a substitute for Dally, before being replaced by Jack Bonadies.

On November 21, the Blues played the Dayton Triangles. A report prior to the match stated that Flynn "undoubtedly will be able to play most of the contest"; however, he ended up being unable to play and Dally filled in for him again. The Blues ended up winning 16–0, for their third victory of the year.

Hartford's final game of the 1926 regular season was played on November 27 against the Duluth Eskimos. Flynn did not play in the match and Dally started in his position for the third straight week. In a one-sided match, the Eskimos, led by Ernie Nevers, defeated the Blues 16–0. The following day, the Blues played the All-New Britain team before 6,000 fans. Flynn appeared as a substitute for Dally in the match, and made an important block on a Chuck Corgan touchdown as Hartford won 10–2. Two more games were scheduled, against the Pottsville Maroons and Providence Steamrollers, but both were canceled. An article in the Hartford Courant at the end of the season wrote the following: "Two great tackles have been developed by the team in Mule Werwaiss of New Haven and Furlonge Flynn, former Cornell linesman. They are big, powerful and willing performers and another year should be even better. Few visiting backs have cared to clash with Werwaiss and Flynn after one or two tries."

Flynn did not return to Hartford for the 1927 season.

== Aviation career ==
Flynn was later an aircraft executive and was described in a 1977 article by United Press International as having "helped pioneer aviation around the world for almost four decades." In 1929, he joined Pratt & Whitney as a trainee on the assembly line. Within one year, he was a field service representative, assisting military, airline and other engine customers.

In the 1930s, Flynn worked at Thompson Trophy and Bendix Trophy races, advising famous pilots such as Jimmy Doolittle and Roscoe Turner. He also became good friends with notable aviators Charles Lindbergh, Wiley Post, and Amelia Earhart.

Flynn's business travels took him throughout the world and totaled over one million miles. At the beginning of World War II, he supervised the installation of Pratt & Whitney engines in France for the French Air Force. When the country was overrun by the Nazis, Flynn just barely escaped capture, leaving on the last train in Paris and returning to the U. S. by boat from Genoa, Italy.

In 1945, Flynn became the P&W service manager and assisted airlines in the United States, Europe, Australia and South America as they re-established service post-war. He saw the P&W business grow from one floor of an old factory building to a large complex in East Hartford. He was the head of a department consisting of more than 800 people, including field service representatives globally. He retired from being service manager in 1966.

== Personal life and death ==
Flynn was for many years active in civic and community affairs, often moderating town meetings. He was a member of the United Congregational Church and was a trustee of the Savings Bank of Tolland as well as a board member of the Tolland Aqueduct Water Company.

Flynn died on November 1, 1977, at the General Hospital in Vernon, Connecticut. He was 75 at the time of his death.
