= List of NFL players (Ma–McMul) =

This is a list of players who have appeared in at least one regular season or postseason game in the National Football League (NFL), American Football League (AFL), or All-America Football Conference (AAFC) and have a last name that falls between "Ma" and "McMul". For the rest of the M's, see list of NFL players (McMur–My). This list is accurate through the end of the 2025 NFL season.

== Maa–Map ==
- Herb Maack
- J. D. Maarleveld
- Bill Maas
- Dylan Mabin
- Greg Mabin
- Ron Mabra
- Tyler Mabry
- Ken MacAfee (born 1929)
- Ken MacAfee (born 1956)
- John Macaulay
- Max MacCollum
- Allen MacDonald
- Buck MacDonald
- Dan MacDonald
- Mark MacDonald
- Mickey MacDonnell
- Jay MacDowell
- Corey Mace
- Mel Maceau
- Don Macek
- John Macerelli
- J. P. Machado
- Mike Machurek
- Art Macioszczyk
- Alex Mack
- Austin Mack
- Cedric Mack
- Daylon Mack
- Elbert Mack
- Isaiah Mack
- Kevin Mack
- Khalil Mack
- Kim Mack
- Ledarius Mack
- Marlon Mack
- Milton Mack
- Red Mack
- Rico Mack
- Stacey Mack
- Terence Mack
- Tom Mack
- Tremain Mack
- Earsell Mackbee
- Jack Mackenroth
- Malaefou MacKenzie
- Roy Mackert
- Dee Mackey
- John Mackey
- Kyle Mackey
- Louis A. Mackey
- Doug Mackie
- Jacque MacKinnon
- David Macklin
- Johnny Mackorell
- Bill Mackrides
- Bob MacLeod
- Tom MacLeod
- Jeremy Maclin
- Stu MacMillan
- Jim MacMurdo
- Ray MacMurray
- Eddie Macon
- Waddy MacPhee
- Kyle MacWherter
- John Maczuzak
- Elmer Madar
- Elmer Madarik
- Lloyd Madden
- Tre Madden
- Bob Maddock
- Anthony Maddox
- Avonte Maddox
- Bob Maddox
- Buster Maddox
- Mark Maddox
- Nick Maddox
- Tommy Maddox
- Tyreek Maddox-Williams
- George Maderos
- John Madigan
- Adrian Madise
- Anthony Madison
- Sam Madison
- John Madsen
- Lynn Madsen
- Mossis Madu
- Justin Madubuike
- Lamar Mady
- Chet Maeda
- Al Maeder
- Jeff Maehl
- Joe Maese
- Phil Mafah
- Boye Mafe
- Atonio Mafi
- Mike Magac
- Alex Magee
- Brandon Magee
- Calvin Magee
- Jim Magee
- John Magee
- Jordan Magee
- Terrence Magee
- Craig Mager
- George Magerkurth
- Chick Maggioli
- Curt Maggitt
- Don Maggs
- Herbert Magida
- Al Maginnes
- Dave Maginnes
- Joe Magliolo
- Al Maglisceau
- Dante Magnani
- James Magner
- Erik Magnuson
- Glen Magnusson
- Paul Maguire
- George Magulick
- T. J. Maguranyanga
- Ryan Mahaffey
- Drew Mahalic
- Bob Mahan
- Sean Mahan
- Walter Mahan
- Reno Mahe
- Jesse Mahelona
- Birtie Maher
- Brett Maher
- Bruce Maher
- Frank Maher
- Eric Mahlum
- Christian Mahogany
- Patrick Mahomes
- Brendan Mahon
- Ike Mahoney
- Jaylen Mahoney
- John Mahoney
- Roger Mahoney
- Al Mahrt
- Armin Mahrt
- Johnny Mahrt
- Lou Mahrt
- Kaluka Maiava
- Steve Maidlow
- Jordan Mailata
- Marcus Mailei
- Ralph Maillard
- Gil Mains
- Jack Maitland
- Don Majkowski
- Billy Majors
- Bobby Majors
- Joe Majors
- Joel Makovicka
- Siupeli Malamala
- Rydell Malancon
- Kevin Malast
- Anthony Malbrough
- Harry Malcolm
- John Malecki
- Howard Maley
- Bill Malinchak
- Gene Malinowski
- Joe Malkovich
- Josh Mallard
- Wesly Mallard
- Ryan Malleck
- Ryan Mallett
- Fran Mallick
- Irvin Mallory
- John Mallory
- Larry Mallory
- Rick Mallory
- Will Mallory
- Ray Mallouf
- Alfred Malone
- Art Malone
- Benny Malone
- Charley Malone
- Darrell Malone
- DeAngelo Malone
- Grover Malone
- Josh Malone
- Mark Malone
- Ralph Malone
- Robert Malone
- Van Malone
- Ned Maloney
- Red Maloney
- Cassh Maluia
- Cameron Malveaux
- Mike Mamula
- Ryan Manalac
- Massimo Manca
- Vaughn Mancha
- Greg Mancz
- Tony Mandarich
- Mike Mandarino
- Pug Manders
- Dave Manders
- Jack Manders
- Chris Mandeville
- Jim Mandich
- Pete Mandley
- Steve Maneri
- James Maness
- Tony Manfreda
- Mark Manges
- Dino Mangiero
- Nick Mangold
- John Mangum (born 1942)
- John Mangum (born 1967)
- Kris Mangum
- Pete Mangum
- Chris Manhertz
- Joe Maniaci
- Jason Maniecki
- Jimmy Manion
- Carl Mankat
- Jim Mankins
- Logan Mankins
- Dexter Manley
- Jack Manley
- James Manley
- Willie Manley
- Bob Mann
- Braden Mann
- Charles Mann
- Dave Mann
- Errol Mann
- Maurice Mann
- Patrick Mannelly
- Aaron Manning
- Archie Manning
- Brian Manning
- Danieal Manning
- Eli Manning
- Jim Manning
- Pete Manning
- Peyton Manning
- Ricky Manning
- Rosie Manning
- Roy Manning
- Terrell Manning
- Wade Manning
- Mario Manningham
- Sean Mannion
- Tim Manoa
- Brison Manor
- Sam Manos
- Don Manoukian
- Jerry Mansfield
- Ray Mansfield
- Von Mansfield
- Eggs Manske
- Joe Mantell
- Tillie Manton
- Giovanni Manu
- Dan Manucci
- EJ Manuel
- Lionel Manuel
- Marquand Manuel
- Rod Manuel
- Sean Manuel
- Frank Manumaleuga
- Brandon Manumaleuna
- Greg Manusky
- Vince Manuwai
- Johnny Manziel
- Baptiste Manzini
- Joseph Manzo
- Howard Maple
- Bobby Maples
- Butch Maples
- Tal Maples
- Stansly Maponga
- Marte Mapu

== Mar ==
- Chris Maragos
- Gary Marangi
- Joe Maras
- Justin March
- Gino Marchetti
- Basilio Marchi
- Ted Marchibroda
- Ken Marchiol
- Frank Marchlewski
- Ron Marciniak
- Chester Marcol
- Hugo Marcolini
- Joe Marconi
- Ed Marcontell
- Pete Marcus
- Greg Marderian
- Olindo Mare
- Owen Marecic
- Andy Marefos
- Jodie Marek
- Ray Marelli
- Bob Margarita
- Ken Margerum
- Joe Margucci
- Marc Mariani
- Ed Marinaro
- Dan Marino
- Vic Marino
- Marv Marinovich
- Todd Marinovich
- Brock Marion
- Dutch Marion
- Frank Marion
- Fred Marion
- Jerry Marion
- Marcus Mariota
- Greg Mark
- Lou Mark
- Cliff Marker
- Harry Marker
- Dale Markham
- Jeff Markland
- Steve Marko
- Vic Markov
- Mark Markovich
- Larry Marks
- Sen'Derrick Marks
- Woody Marks
- Seth Marler
- Dean Marlowe
- Sal Marone
- Laurence Maroney
- Duke Maronic
- Steve Maronic
- Lou Marotti
- Ali Marpet
- Rube Marquardt
- Bob Marques
- Bradley Marquez
- Doug Marrone
- John Marrow
- Vince Marrow
- Jim Marsalis
- Aaron Marsh
- Amos Marsh
- Cassius Marsh
- Curt Marsh
- Curtis Marsh, Jr.
- Curtis Marsh, Sr.
- Dick Marsh
- Doug Marsh
- Frank Wayne Marsh
- Al Marshall
- Alfonso Marshall
- Anthony Marshall
- Arthur Marshall
- Bobby Marshall
- Brandon Marshall (born 1984)
- Brandon Marshall (born 1989)
- Bud Marshall
- Byron Marshall
- Charley Marshall
- Chuck Marshall
- David Marshall
- Ed Marshall
- Greg Marshall
- Henry Marshall
- Iman Marshall
- Jalin Marshall
- James Marshall
- Jason Marshall Jr.
- Jim Marshall
- Jonathan Marshall
- Keyonta Marshall
- Larry Marshall
- Lemar Marshall
- Leonard Marshall
- Marvin Marshall
- Nick Marshall
- Phil Marshall
- Randy Marshall
- Rasheed Marshall
- Richard Marshall
- Tank Marshall
- Terrace Marshall Jr.
- Torrance Marshall
- Trey Marshall
- Warren Marshall
- Whit Marshall
- Wilber Marshall
- Ralph Marston
- Herman Martell
- James Marten
- Paul Martha
- Aaron Martin
- Abe Martin
- Amos Martin
- Billy Martin (born 1938)
- Billy Martin (born 1942)
- Blanche Martin
- Bob Martin
- Brodric Martin
- Caleb Martin
- Cecil Martin
- Chandler Martin
- Charles Martin
- Charly Martin
- Chris Martin (born 1960)
- Chris Martin (born 1974)
- Curtis Martin
- Dave Martin
- David Martin (born 1959)
- David Martin (born 1979)
- Dee Martin
- Derrick Martin (born 1957)
- Derrick Martin (born 1985)
- Don Martin
- Doug Martin (born 1957)
- Doug Martin (born 1989)
- Manny Martin
- Emerson Martin
- Eric Martin (born 1961)
- Eric Martin (born 1991)
- Frank Martin
- Gabe Martin
- George Martin
- Harvey Martin
- Hersh Martin
- Ike Martin
- Ingle Martin
- Jack Martin
- Jacob Martin
- Jamar Martin
- Jamie Martin
- Jim Martin
- Joe Martin
- Johnny Martin
- Jonathan Martin
- Josh Martin
- Kamal Martin
- Kareem Martin
- Kelvin Martin
- Keshawn Martin
- Keyon Martin
- Koda Martin
- Larry Martin
- Marcus Martin
- Matt Martin
- Mike Martin (born 1960)
- Mike Martin (born 1990)
- Nick Martin (born 1993)
- Nick Martin (born 2002)
- Quan Martin
- Robbie Martin
- Rod Martin
- Ronald Martin
- Ruvell Martin
- Saladin Martin
- Sam Martin
- Sammy Martin
- Sherrod Martin
- Steve Martin (born 1964)
- Steve Martin (born 1974)
- Tay Martin
- Tee Martin
- Terrance Martin
- Tony Martin
- Tracy Martin
- Vaughn Martin
- Vern Martin
- Wayne Martin
- Wes Martin
- Zack Martin
- David Martin-Robinson
- Bam Martin-Scott
- Roy Martineau
- Patsy Martinelli
- Adrian Martinez
- Blake Martinez
- Glenn Martinez
- Rich Martini
- John Martinkovic
- Freddie Martino
- Phil Martinovich
- Lonnie Marts
- Tommy Marvaso
- Eugene Marve
- Mickey Marvin
- Greg Marx
- Russell Maryland

== Mas–Maz ==
- Tyler Marz
- Easton Mascarenas-Arnold
- Matthew Masifilo
- Len Masini
- John Maskas
- Matt Maslowski
- Mike Maslowski
- Ben Mason
- Dave Mason
- Derrick Mason
- Eddie Mason
- Grant Mason
- Joel Mason
- Jordan Mason
- Larry Mason
- Lindsey Mason
- Marcus Mason
- Sam Mason
- Shaq Mason
- Tommy Mason
- Tre Mason
- Wayne Mass
- Jonathan Massaquoi
- Mohamed Massaquoi
- Tim Massaquoi
- Carlton Massey
- Chris Massey
- Jim Massey
- Robert Massey
- Bobby Massie
- Rick Massie
- Billy Masters
- Bob Masters
- Norm Masters
- Walt Masters
- Bernie Masterson
- Bob Masterson
- Forrest Masterson
- Luke Masterson
- Tim Masthay
- Le'Shai Maston
- John Mastrangelo
- Gus Mastrogany
- Jeron Mastrud
- Hercules Mata'afa
- Stan Mataele
- Tyler Matakevich
- Bill Matan
- Chris Matau
- Moliki Matavao
- Ed Matesic
- Joe Matesic
- Bob Matheson
- Jack Matheson
- Riley Matheson
- Barney Mathews
- Derrick Mathews
- Jason Mathews
- Ned Mathews
- Neil Mathews
- Ray Mathews
- Ricardo Mathews
- Ryan Mathews
- Mathewson
- Ric Mathias
- Tyrann Mathieu
- Bill Mathis
- Damarri Mathis
- Dedric Mathis
- Evan Mathis
- Jerome Mathis
- Kevin Mathis
- Mark Mathis
- Ochaun Mathis
- Phidarian Mathis
- Rashean Mathis
- Reggie Mathis
- Robert Mathis
- Terance Mathis
- Bruce Mathison
- Charlie Mathys
- Trevor Matich
- Ross Matiscik
- John Matisi
- Tony Matisi
- John Matlock
- Scott Matlock
- Ollie Matson
- Pat Matson
- Archie Matsos
- Arthur Matsu
- Tom Matte
- Frank Matteo
- Joe Mattern
- Ron Mattes
- Christian Matthew
- Al Matthews
- Allama Matthews
- Aubrey Matthews
- Bill Matthews
- Bo Matthews
- Bruce Matthews
- Casey Matthews
- Chris Matthews
- Clay Matthews III
- Clay Matthews, Jr.
- Clay Matthews, Sr.
- Cliff Matthews
- Henry Matthews
- Ira Matthews
- Jake Matthews
- John Matthews
- Jordan Matthews
- Kevin Matthews
- Michael Matthews
- Rishard Matthews
- Shane Matthews
- Steve Matthews
- Wes Matthews
- Frank Mattiace
- Jack Mattiford
- Fran Mattingly
- Frank Mattioli
- Alexander Mattison
- Bryan Mattison
- Grant Mattos
- Harry Mattos
- John Mattox
- Marv Mattox
- Riley Mattson
- John Matuszak
- Marv Matuszak
- Al Matuza
- Rey Maualuga
- Cody Mauch
- Carl Mauck
- Matt Mauck
- Josh Mauga
- Kana'i Mauga
- Reagan Maui'a
- Francisco Mauigoa
- Tuffy Maul
- Lorenzo Mauldin
- Stan Mauldin
- Arthur Maulet
- Chris Maumalanga
- Viliami Maumau
- Andy Maurer
- Josh Mauro
- Dorian Mausi
- Michael Mauti
- Rich Mauti
- Earl Maves
- Menil Mavraides
- Kevin Mawae
- Curtis Maxey
- Johnny Maxey
- Marcus Maxey
- Brett Maxie
- Alvin Maxson
- Bruce Maxwell
- Byron Maxwell
- Jim Maxwell
- Joey Maxwell
- Marcus Maxwell
- Tommy Maxwell
- Vernon Maxwell
- Art May
- Bill May
- Dean May
- Deems May
- Jack May
- Marc May
- Mark May
- Ray May
- Sherriden May
- Walt May
- Doug Mayberry
- James Mayberry
- Jermane Mayberry
- Tony Mayberry
- Aaron Maybin
- Jared Mayden
- Drake Maye
- Marcus Maye
- Emil Mayer
- Frank Mayer
- Michael Mayer
- Shawn Mayer
- Adrian Mayes
- Alonzo Mayes
- Ben Mayes
- Carl Mayes
- Derrick Mayes
- Michael Mayes
- Rueben Mayes
- Rufus Mayes
- Tony Mayes
- Baker Mayfield
- Corey Mayfield
- Jalen Mayfield
- Lindy Mayhew
- Martin Mayhew
- Gene Mayl
- Vince Mayle
- Brad Maynard
- Don Maynard
- Les Maynard
- Lew Mayne
- David Mayo
- Jerod Mayo
- Ron Mayo
- Mike Mayock
- Benson Mayowa
- Alvoid Mays
- Cade Mays
- Corey Mays
- Damon Mays
- Dave Mays
- Devante Mays
- Jerry Mays (born 1939)
- Jerry Mays (born 1967)
- Joe Mays
- Kivuusama Mays
- Lee Mays
- Stafford Mays
- Taylor Mays
- Frank Maznicki
- Fred Mazurek
- Cole Mazza
- Vince Mazza
- Geno Mazzanti
- Jerry Mazzanti
- Tim Mazzetti

== Mb–McC ==
- Marcus Mbow
- Joey Mbu
- Bob McAdams
- Carl McAdams
- Dean McAdams
- Jason McAddley
- Derrick McAdoo
- Fred McAfee
- George McAfee
- Pat McAfee
- Wes McAfee
- Ed McAleney
- Chris McAlister
- James McAlister
- Ken McAlister
- Deuce McAllister
- Tyreik McAllister
- Jack McArthur
- Kevin McArthur
- Jude McAtamney
- Jack McAuliffe
- Darcel McBath
- Mike McBath
- Ryan McBean
- Mat McBriar
- Adrian McBride
- Charlie McBride
- Jack McBride
- Norm McBride
- Oscar McBride
- Ron McBride
- Tod McBride
- Tre McBride
- Trey McBride
- Trumaine McBride
- Turk McBride
- Gerald McBurrows
- Dick McCabe
- Jerry McCabe
- Kevin McCadam
- Don McCafferty
- J. J. McCarthy
- Art McCaffray
- Bob McCaffrey
- Christian McCaffrey
- Ed McCaffrey
- Luke McCaffrey
- Max McCaffrey
- Mike McCaffrey
- Bob McCain
- Bobby McCain
- Brice McCain
- Chris McCain
- Mac McCain
- Onterio McCalebb
- Tanner McCalister
- Bob McCall
- Don McCall
- Ed McCall
- Joe McCall
- Marquan McCall
- Reese McCall
- Ron McCall
- Fred McCallister
- Napoleon McCallum
- John McCambridge
- Jim McCanless
- Bryan McCann
- Ernie McCann
- Jim McCann
- Tim McCann
- Darnerien McCants
- Keith McCants
- Matt McCants
- Keenan McCardell
- Justin McCareins
- John McCargo
- Larry McCarren
- A. J. McCarron
- Riley McCarron
- Brendan McCarthy
- Colin McCarthy
- Don McCarthy
- Jack McCarthy
- Jim McCarthy
- John McCarthy
- Kyle McCarthy
- Shawn McCarthy
- Vince McCarthy
- Pete McCartney
- Ron McCartney
- Mickey McCarty
- Eugene McCaslin
- Don McCauley
- Marcus McCauley
- Tom McCauley
- Leo McCausland
- Bill McCaw
- Bob McChesney (born 1912)
- Bob McChesney (born 1926)
- Matt McChesney
- Cliff McClain
- Clint McClain
- Dewey McClain
- Jameel McClain
- Jimmy McClain
- Le'Ron McClain
- Robert McClain
- Rolando McClain
- Terrell McClain
- Cy McClairen
- Brent McClanahan
- Randy McClanahan
- Bill McClard
- Norris McCleary
- Albert McClellan
- Jase McClellan
- Mike McClellan
- Shea McClellin
- Central McClellion
- Jacques McClendon
- Skip McClendon
- Warren McClendon
- Willie McClendon
- Dexter McCleon
- J. J. McCleskey
- Curtis McClinton
- Mike McCloskey
- Nick McCloud
- Ray-Ray McCloud
- Tyrus McCloud
- Dave McCloughan
- Kent McCloughan
- Darrell McClover
- Stanley McClover
- Willie McClung
- Bob McClure
- Brian McClure
- Stefan McClure
- Todd McClure
- Wayne McClure
- David McCluskey
- Dexter McCluster
- Dexter McCoil
- Bill McColl
- Milt McColl
- Jaylen McCollough
- Andy McCollum
- Bubba McCollum
- Harley McCollum
- Ryan McCollum
- Tristin McCollum
- Zyon McCollum
- Don McComb
- Nat McCombs
- Tony McCombs
- Ladd McConkey
- Phil McConkey
- Brian McConnell
- Dewey McConnell
- Frank McConnell
- Eric McCoo
- Darris McCord
- Quentin McCord
- Hurvin McCormack
- Mike McCormack
- Dave McCormick
- Elmer McCormick
- Felix McCormick
- Frank McCormick
- John McCormick
- Len McCormick
- Mason McCormick
- Sincere McCormick
- Tom McCormick
- Walter McCormick
- Kez McCorvey
- Devin McCourty
- Jason McCourty
- Josh McCown
- Luke McCown
- McCoy
- Anthony McCoy
- Colt McCoy
- Erik McCoy
- Gerald McCoy
- Jamie McCoy
- Joel McCoy
- Larry McCoy
- LeRon McCoy
- LeSean McCoy
- Lloyd McCoy
- Matt McCoy
- Mike McCoy (born 1948)
- Mike McCoy (born 1953)
- Tony McCoy
- Matthew McCrane
- Fred McCrary
- Greg McCrary
- Herdis McCrary
- Michael McCrary
- Nate McCrary
- Marcelino McCrary-Ball
- Bobby McCray
- Bruce McCray
- Danny McCray
- Demetrius McCray
- Justin McCray
- Kelcie McCray
- Lerentee McCray
- L. J. McCray
- Prentice McCray
- Robert McCray
- Willie McCray
- Bob McCreary
- Loaird McCreary
- Roger McCreary
- Marlon McCree
- Ed McCrillis
- John McCrumbly
- Dale McCullers
- Daniel McCullers
- Earl McCullouch
- Andy McCullough
- Bob McCullough
- George McCullough
- Hal McCullough
- Hugh McCullough
- Jake McCullough
- Liam McCullough
- Sultan McCullough
- Sam McCullum
- Robert McCune
- Dave McCurry
- Mike McCurry
- Jim McCusker
- Daylon McCutcheon
- Lance McCutcheon
- Lawrence McCutcheon

== McD–McI ==
- Karl McDade
- Ed McDaniel
- Emmanuel McDaniel
- Jacobbi McDaniel
- Jeremy McDaniel
- John McDaniel
- LeCharls McDaniel
- Orlando McDaniel
- Randall McDaniel
- Terry McDaniel
- Tony McDaniel
- Wahoo McDaniel
- Dave McDaniels
- Pellom McDaniels
- Conor McDermott
- Gary McDermott
- KC McDermott
- Kevin McDermott
- Lloyd McDermott
- Sean McDermott
- Shane McDermott
- Mardye McDole
- Ron McDole
- McDonald
- Andrew McDonald
- Brandon McDonald
- Clinton McDonald
- Cooper McDonald
- Cy McDonald
- Darnell McDonald
- Devon McDonald
- Dewey McDonald
- Dexter McDonald
- Don McDonald
- Dustin McDonald
- Dwight McDonald
- Flip McDonald
- James McDonald
- Jim McDonald (born 1911)
- Jim McDonald (born 1915)
- John McDonald
- Keith McDonald
- Les McDonald
- Mike McDonald (born 1953)
- Mike McDonald (born 1958)
- Nick McDonald
- Paul McDonald
- Quintus McDonald
- Ramos McDonald
- Ray McDonald (born 1944)
- Ray McDonald (born 1984)
- Ricardo McDonald
- Shaun McDonald
- Tevin McDonald
- Tim McDonald
- T. J. McDonald
- Tommy McDonald
- Vance McDonald
- Walt McDonald (born 1911)
- Walt McDonald (born 1920)
- Will McDonald IV
- Brady McDonnell
- Bob McDonough (born 1919)
- Bob McDonough (born 1963)
- Coley McDonough
- Paul McDonough
- Bob McDougal
- Kevin McDougal
- Bradley McDougald
- Doug McDougald
- Gerry McDougall
- Dexter McDougle
- Jerome McDougle
- Stockar McDougle
- Anthony McDowell
- Bubba McDowell
- John McDowell
- Malik McDowell
- George McDuffie
- Isaiah McDuffie
- O. J. McDuffie
- Trent McDuffie
- Hugh McElhenny
- Blaine McElmurry
- Bucky McElroy
- Codey McElroy
- Greg McElroy
- Leeland McElroy
- Ray McElroy
- Reggie McElroy
- Vann McElroy
- Bill McElwain
- Jason McEndoo
- Doug McEnulty
- Ed McEvoy
- Tanner McEvoy
- Craig McEwen
- Banks McFadden
- Bryant McFadden
- Darren McFadden
- Jordan McFadden
- Kimario McFadden
- Leon McFadden
- Marques McFadden
- Marshall McFadden
- Marv McFadden
- Micah McFadden
- Paul McFadden
- Thad McFadden
- Walter McFadden
- Bud McFadin
- Anthony McFarland
- Booger McFarland
- Dylan McFarland
- Jim McFarland
- Kay McFarland
- Nyle McFarlane
- Chris McFoy
- Willis McGahee
- Tim McGarigle
- Wane McGarity
- Scott McGarrahan
- Barney McGarry
- John McGarry
- Kaleb McGary
- Walt McGaw
- Clarence McGeary
- Ben McGee
- Bob McGee
- Brandon McGee
- Buford McGee
- Carl McGee
- Dell McGee
- Ed McGee
- George McGee
- Harry McGee
- Max McGee
- Mike McGee
- Molly McGee
- Richmond McGee
- Stacy McGee
- Stephen McGee
- Terrence McGee
- Tim McGee
- Tony McGee (born 1949)
- Tony McGee (born 1971)
- Willie McGee
- John McGeever
- Phil McGeoghan
- Rich McGeorge
- Kanavis McGhee
- Garrett McGhin
- Charlie McGibbony
- Firpo McGilbra
- Eddie McGill
- George McGill
- Karmeeleyah McGill
- Keith McGill
- Lenny McGill
- Mike McGill
- Ralph McGill
- T. Y. McGill
- Willie McGinest
- Ed McGinley
- Larry McGinnis
- Len McGirl
- Ed McGlasson
- Mike McGlinchey
- Chester McGlockton
- Matt McGloin
- Joe McGlone
- Dwight McGlothern
- Mike McGlynn
- Hugh McGoldrick
- Bruce McGonnigal
- Connor McGovern (born 1993)
- Connor McGovern (born 1997)
- Rob McGovern
- Brandon McGowan
- Kyric McGowan
- Reggie McGowan
- Joe McGrail
- Brian McGrath
- Dick McGrath
- Frank McGrath
- Mark McGrath
- Sean McGrath
- Jon McGraw
- Mike McGraw
- Thurman "Fum" McGraw
- Braiden McGregor
- Keli McGregor
- Dan McGrew
- Larry McGrew
- Reggie McGrew
- Sylvester McGrew
- Curtis McGriff
- Lee McGriff
- Travis McGriff
- Tyrone McGriff
- Lamar McGriggs
- Cameron McGrone
- Dusty McGrorty
- Mike McGruder
- Elijah McGuire
- Gene McGuire
- Isaiah McGuire
- Kaipo McGuire
- Monte McGuire
- Warren McGuirk
- Dan McGwire
- Joe McHale
- Tom McHale
- Lamar McHan
- Pat McHugh
- Sean McHugh
- Danny McIlhany
- Don McIlhenny
- Wally McIlwain
- Pat McInally
- Mac McIndoe
- Nick McInerney
- Sean McInerney
- Hugh McInnis
- Al McIntosh
- Chris McIntosh
- Damion McIntosh
- Joe McIntosh
- Kenny McIntosh
- R.J. McIntosh
- Rocky McIntosh
- Toddrick McIntosh
- Corey McIntyre
- Garrett McIntyre
- Guy McIntyre
- Jeff McIntyre
- Secdrick McIntyre
- Everett McIver
- Rick McIvor

== McJ–McMul ==
- Paul McJulien
- Bill McKalip
- Bob McKay
- John McKay, Jr.
- Roy McKay
- Paul McKee
- Tanner McKee
- James McKeehan
- Marlin McKeever
- Vito McKeever
- Keith McKeller
- Leodis McKelvin
- Chris McKenzie
- Isaiah McKenzie
- Kahlil McKenzie
- Kareem McKenzie
- Keith McKenzie
- Kevin McKenzie
- Mike McKenzie
- Raleigh McKenzie
- Reggie McKenzie (born 1950)
- Reggie McKenzie (born 1963)
- Rich McKenzie
- Tyrone McKenzie
- Sean McKeon
- Jack McKetes
- Marcus McKethan
- Mike McKibben
- Jason McKie
- Scott McKillop
- Alvin McKinley
- Bill McKinley
- Dennis McKinley
- Kenny McKinley
- Takkarist McKinley
- Verone McKinley
- Phil McKinnely
- Benardrick McKinney
- Bill McKinney
- Brandon McKinney
- Jeremy McKinney
- Odis McKinney
- Royce McKinney
- Seth McKinney
- Steve McKinney
- Xavier McKinney
- Zion McKinney
- Bryant McKinnie
- Hugh McKinnis
- Dennis McKinnon
- Don McKinnon
- Jeremiah McKinnon
- Jerick McKinnon
- Ronald McKinnon
- Kool-Aid McKinstry
- Cassanova McKinzy
- Dick McKissack
- J. D. McKissic
- Tre' McKitty
- Colton McKivitz
- Dennis McKnight
- James McKnight
- Joe McKnight
- Ted McKnight
- Bill McKoy
- Tim McKyer
- Tanner McLachlan
- Joe McLain
- Kevin McLain
- Mayes McLain
- Charlie McLaughlin
- Chase McLaughlin
- Jaleel McLaughlin
- Joe McLaughlin
- John McLaughlin
- Lee McLaughlin
- Leon McLaughlin
- Steve McLaughlin
- Tom McLaughlin
- John McLaughry
- Terry McLaurin
- Ray McLean (born 1897)
- Ray McLean (born 1915)
- Ron McLean
- Scott McLean
- Chris McLemore
- Dana McLemore
- Emmett McLemore
- Thomas McLemore
- Derrick McLendon
- Steve McLendon
- TK McLendon
- Bruce McLenna
- Bob McLeod
- Kevin McLeod
- Mike McLeod
- Rodney McLeod
- Russ McLeod
- Harold McLinton
- Art McMahon
- Dylan McMahon
- Harry McMahon
- Jim McMahon
- Mike McMahon
- Tommy McMahon
- John McMakin
- Sherrick McManis
- Wynton McManis
- Brandon McManus
- Tom McManus
- Herb McMath
- Racey McMath
- Randy McMichael
- Steve McMichael
- John McMichaels
- Chuck McMillan
- David McMillan
- Eddie McMillan
- Erik McMillan
- Ernie McMillan
- Jalen McMillan
- Raekwon McMillan
- Randy McMillan
- Tetairoa McMillan
- Dan McMillen
- Jim McMillen
- Audray McMillian
- Henry McMillian
- Ja'Quan McMillian
- Jerron McMillian
- Mark McMillian
- Bo McMillin
- Jim McMillin
- Donovan McMillon
- Todd McMillon
- Patrick McMorris
- John McMullan
- Billy McMullen
- Danny McMullen
- Kirk McMullen
