= Jack Bonadies =

American football player (1892–1965)

No. 28
- Positions: Guard, tackle

Personal information
- Born: December 2, 1892; Corleto Perticara, Italy
- Died: October 13, 1965 (aged 72); Hartford, Connecticut
- Listed weight: 208 lb (94 kg)

Career information
- College: None

Career history
- Hartford Blues (1926); All-Hartford (c. 1927–1929)

Career statistics
- Games played: 5
- Stats at Pro Football Reference

John A. Bonadies, sometimes called Giovanni A. Bonadies (December 2, 1892 – October 13, 1965) was an Italian professional American football guard and tackle who played one season in the National Football League (NFL) for the Hartford Blues. Born in Corleto Perticara, his family moved to United States when he was young. At the age of 34 in 1926, Bonadies was called to play professional football with the Blues. He appeared in five games, all as a backup.

== Early life and education ==
Jack Bonadies was born on December 2, 1892, in Corleto Perticara, "a village in the hills surrounded by vineyards, olive groves and woods." His family moved to New Rochelle, New York when he was young and later to Hartford, Connecticut. His high school is unknown. He did not attend a college. Due to his weight of 208 pounds (sometimes listed 210), Bonadies was called "the Italian Giant" and would play either the tackle or guard position in semi-professional games.

== Professional career ==
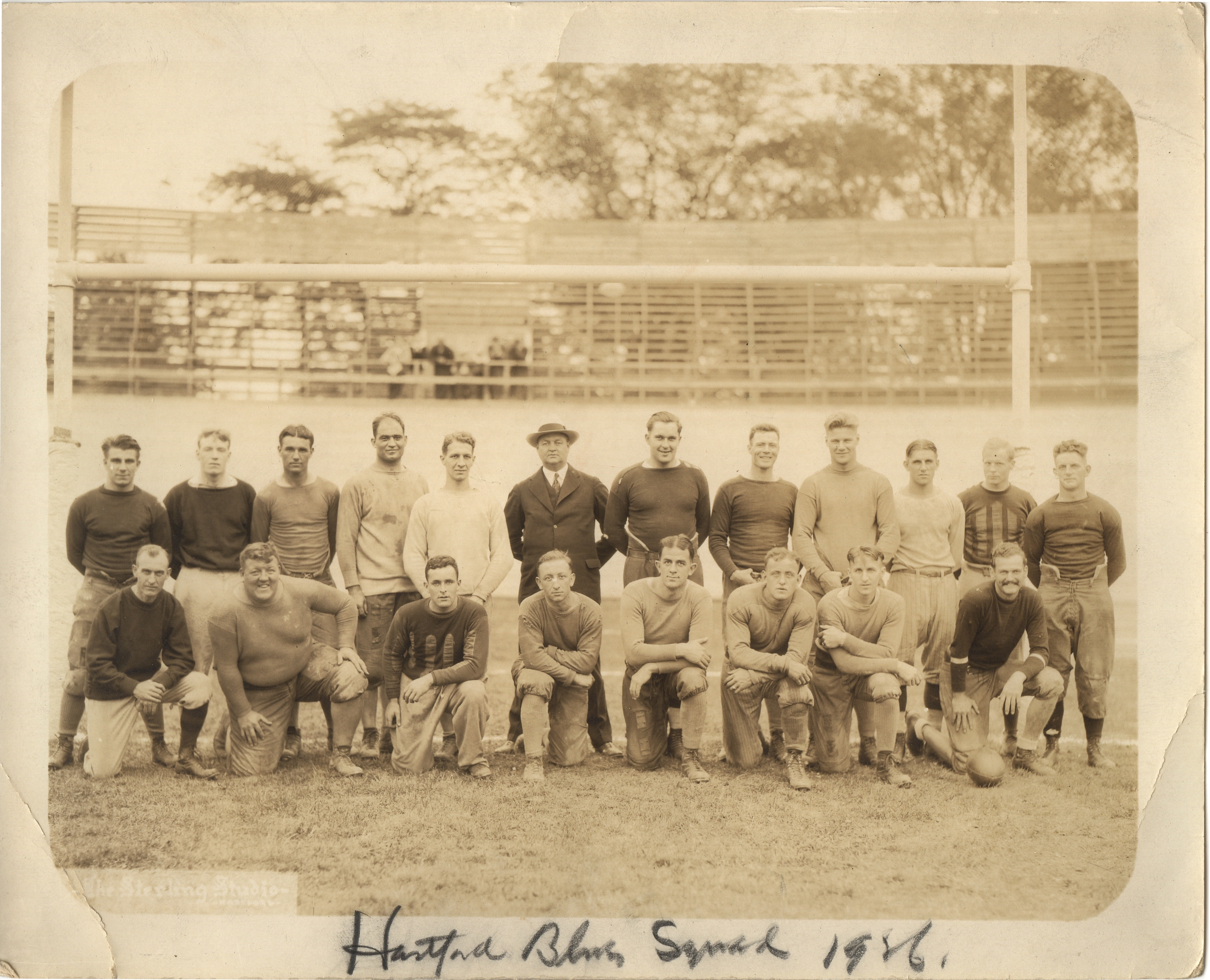
1926 Hartford Blues team photo.

In 1926, at the age of 34, Bonadies was signed by the Hartford Blues of the National Football League (NFL) to play professional football. He made his debut in week one of the season, against the New York Giants, as "a substitute for Donlan". The Blues ended the game losing 0–21, in front of 6,500 fans at East Hartford Velodrome. Bonadies did not appear in recaps for the following game, an October 2 loss to the Frankford Yellow Jackets, but was mentioned in their game the following day. In the third game of the season, Bonadies was sent as a replacement for Grat O'Connell late in the game as the Blues were shut out again by the Yellow Jackets, this time by the score of 0–10. The following game was a 0–6 loss versus the Brooklyn Lions. In the loss he was on the bench the entire game, and did not see any playing time.

After a Hartford player was suspended prior to their next game against the Lions again, Bonadies was expected to start the game to replace him. An article in the Hartford Courant said, "It is probable that the Italian giant, Jack Bonadies, will start against Brooklyn at guard ... Bonadies, a local product, has been coming along fast and threatens to oust a regular before the season is half over. He is a big, powerful boy and eager for work. He is a looming figure at every practice session." He ended up being backup again against the Lions, but did enter the game early as a substitute for Ralph Nichols, before Nichols rejoined the game. Hartford won the game 16–6, in their first victory of the season. the Blues suffered another defeat in the next week, losing 2–7 versus the Kansas City Cowboys. Bonadies did not see any playing time against the Cowboys, spending the entire game on the bench. The Blues recorded their second win of the season against the Canton Bulldogs on November 7, before suffering another loss the following week against the Buffalo Rangers. Bonadies left the team after illness made his play decline on November 18, following a total of five games played in.

He returned to football in the following year, spending the next few seasons playing for a team called "All-Hartford".

== Later life and death ==
He lived in the Hartford-area for the final 50 years of his life. He was owner of a restaurant there, called "John's Restaurant", retiring in the early 1960s.

With his wife, Frances, Bonadies had two sons and three daughters. He died on October 13, 1965, in Hartford, at the age of 72.
