= 1927 Hartford Giants season =

National Football League team season

- Head coach: Vincent Lacava
- Home stadium: East Hartford Velodrome, Clarkin Field

Results
- Record: 7–1 (incomplete data)
- League place: independent team
- Playoffs: "No Playoffs"

The 1927 Hartford Giants season was their fourth and final season in existence. The team played the prior season as the Hartford Blues of the National Football League. However, after the 1926 season, the NFL's owners voted to cut down the number of teams from 22 to 12. As a result, Hartford's franchise was eliminated. Blues' owner George Mulligan reorganized the team into a semi-pro team, the Hartford Giants. The data for the team's overall record is incomplete, however it is clear that posted a 7–1 record in the game results that are known. The Giants would disband for good after the season.

== Schedule ==
Week	Date	Opponent	Result	Record
1	October 2	Fort Slocum	W 18–0	1–0
2	October 10	Flushing Triangles	W 27–0	2–0
3	October 16	New London Submarine Base	W 2–0	3–0
4	October 23	Silvertowns of Springfield	W 7–0	4–0
5	November 6	All-Hartford	W 12–0	5–0
6	November 13	All-Hartford	W 20–0	6–0
7	November 20	at All-New Britain	L 0–13	6–1
8	November 27	at All-New Britain	W 9–0	7–1
