= 1925 Hartford Blues season =

American football team season

- Head coach: Dick McGrath
- Home stadium: Brassco Field, Clarkin Field

Results
- Record: 10-2 (overall); 2–1 (against NFL)
- League place: independent team

The 1925 Waterbury-Hartford Blues season was their second season in existence and their last independent season before joining the National Football League in 1926. The team finished the season with a 10–2 record. The team also relocated to Hartford from Waterbury midway through the season. With the change in venue, the team was renamed the Hartford Blues.

== Schedule ==
Game	Date	Opponent	Result	Record	Venue	Attendance	Sources
1	September 27	Yonkers Caseys	W 32–0	1–0			
2	October 4	at Hartford West Sides	**W** 17–3	2–0			
3	October 11	All-Adams	**W** 34–0	3–0			
4	October 18	at **Rochester Jeffersons**	**W** 7–6	4–0			
5	November 1	at Newark F.B.C.	**W** 26–0	5–0			
6	November 8	**Rochester Jeffersons**	**W** 8–6	6–0			
7	November 15	All-New Britain	**L** 0–6	6–1			
8	November 22	All-Norwalk	**W** 9–6	7–1			
9	November 29	at All-New Britain	**W** 28–7	8–1			
10	December 6	at Pere Marquette (Boston)	**W** 12–0	9–1			
11	December 6	at St. Alphonsus (Boston)	**W** 10–0	10–1			
12	December 12	**Cleveland Bulldogs**	**L** 6–13	10–2			
Note: Games in **bold** were against NFL teams.
