= Roy Mackert =

American football player and coach (1894–1942)

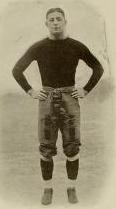
- Mackert at Maryland in 1919

Profile
- Positions: Tackle, center, fullback

Personal information
- Born: February 2, 1894; Sunbury, Pennsylvania, U.S.
- Died: February 12, 1942 (aged 48); Washington D.C., U.S.
- Listed height: 6 ft 2 in (1.88 m)
- Listed weight: 200 lb (91 kg)

Career information
- College: Maryland

Career history
- 1925: Rochester Jeffersons
- 1925: Hartford Blues

Other information
- Military career
- Allegiance: United States
- Conflicts: World War II

Charles Leroy "Roy" (Bob) Mackert (February 2, 1894 – February 12, 1942) was an American football player. He played professional football for the Rochester Jeffersons for one season in 1925. Mackert played college football for Maryland, and returned there in 1935 as the line coach.

Mackert was born on February 2, 1894, in Sunbury, Pennsylvania. He attended Lebanon Valley College and then the University of Maryland. He played as a fullback on the Maryland football team during the 1919 and 1920 seasons.

Mackert played for the Rochester Jeffersons in the National Football League (NFL) for the 1925 season. Mackert saw action in two games, including one start, as a center and a tackle. By November 1925, George Mulligan of the Hartford Blues signed Mackert to play for the team alongside Obie Bristow, Steve Owen and Don Miller of Notre Dame's Four Horsemen. The Blues would become an NFL franchise a year later in 1926.

In 1926, Mackert returned to his alma mater as an assistant alongside Burton Shipley under head coach Curley Byrd. In 1935, he served as the line coach under Jack Faber. During World War II, Mackert enlisted in the United States military. Although several sources, including the Pro Football Hall of Fame claim that he was killed during the war, he died at a hospital in Washington D.C. after a lengthy illness unrelated to the conflict.

The Charles Leroy Mackert Award was named in his honor and acknowledged the most outstanding wrestlers at the University of Maryland. He was inducted into the University of Maryland Athletic Hall of Fame in 1982.
