= Eddie Keenan =

American football player (1894–1984)

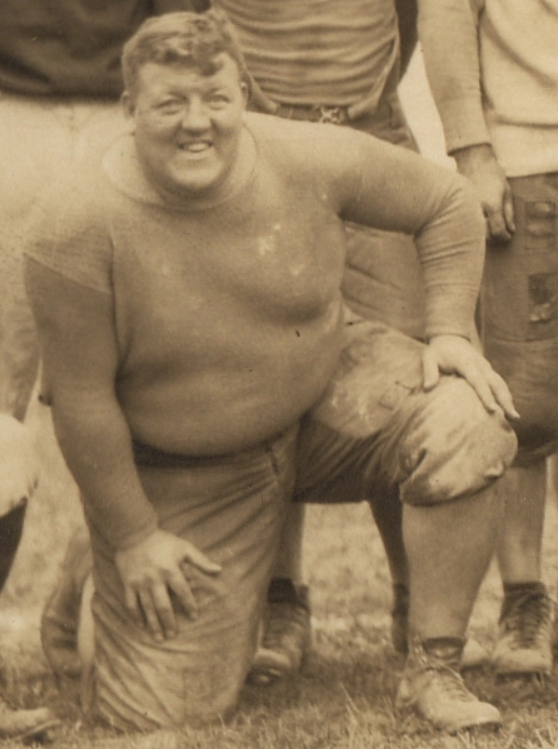
- Keenan with the Hartford Blues

No. 25
- Position: Guard

Personal information
- Born: October 30, 1894; Waterbury, Connecticut, U.S.
- Died: January 28, 1984 (aged 89); Waterbury, Connecticut, U.S.
- Listed height: 6 ft 4 in (1.93 m)
- Listed weight: 320 lb (145 kg)

Career information
- High school: Waterbury (CT)
- College: Washington College

Career history
- New York Yankees (1926)*; Hartford Blues/Giants (1926–1927); New York Giants (1927–1928); All-Torrington (1928); Nutmeg Athletic Club (1928)
- * Offseason or practice squad member only

Awards and highlights
- NFL champion (1927)

Career statistics
- Games played: 10
- Games started: 10
- Stats at Pro Football Reference

Edward Felix Keenan (October 30, 1894 – January 28, 1984) was an American football guard who played one season in the National Football League (NFL) for the Hartford Blues. He played college football at Washington College. Weighing 320 pounds, Keenan was the largest person in the game at the time. He also spent time with the New York Yankees and New York Giants.

== Early life and education ==
Keenan was born on October 30, 1894, in Waterbury, Connecticut. He attended Waterbury High School. In 1917, he was drafted to serve in World War I and received training at Camp Devens in Massachusetts. While at the camp, Keenan played on their military service football team under coach Percy Haughton. After receiving honorable discharge from the military, Keenan enrolled at Washington College in Chestertown, Maryland.

Keenan began his college football career in 1921. At the beginning of his freshman year, he weighed 240 pounds, making him the heaviest player in the collegiate ranks. "I was the biggest guy in college ball," he later recalled, "and not by a little bit. I weighed 240 pounds. Next guy to me, fella from Georgetown, weighed about 210." Later in the season, he increased his weight to 280 pounds.

In Washington's 1921 game against Western Maryland, it was reportedly through the work of Keenan that Washington was able to tie (0–0) Western Maryland, who averaged over 20 pounds more per-player than the former. A staff journalist for The Baltimore Sun wrote after the game, "That the Chestertown (Washington) line was able to hold the Green and Gold eleven (Western Maryland) while outweighed 20 pounds to the man was largely due to the efforts of big Eddie Keenan, who time after time piled up the plays directed at the center of the line." Many of the team's substantial gains were reported to be through his blocking.

At the season's end, Keenan was named to the All-Maryland college football team by The Baltimore Sun. A report stated "Keenan was the mainstay of a weak team all season. He was never outplayed and earns his place [on the All-Maryland team] by a wide margin." At the end of the season he weighed 287 pounds, and was considered to be "one of the biggest men who ever played on a Maryland gridiron." Keenan was also selected to the Baltimore American All-Maryland team.

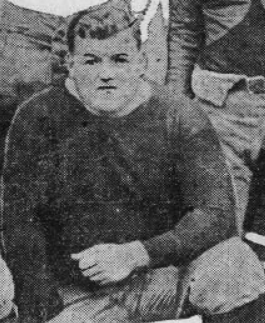
Keenan in 1922

By the start of the 1922 season, Keenan had reached 297 pounds. By comparison, the four other Washington linemen averaged 170 pounds each. In a game preview for Washington's match against St. John's, The Baltimore Sun wrote that "The [St. John's] Cadet line will not average as much as that of the [Washington] Eastern Shoremen, due principally to the ponderous bulk of one Chestertown lineman, Keenan." His "all-around work" was described as one of the "features" of their game against PMC and he was given a mention as one of the Washington stars after their match against St. John's. In addition to playing guard, he was also sometimes used as a running back, making a 20-yard rush as well as several first down carries in the loss to St. John's.

At the end of the 1922 season, Keenan was again named to The Baltimore Sun All-Maryland squad as first-team selection. A report in the paper stated the following, "Keenan once again proved the mainstay of the Washington College forward combination. Not once during the season was he outplayed, and he earns a place on the first team [All-Maryland squad] by a wide margin ... Besides playing an aggressive and heady game on defense and a driving offensive game, Keenan was of other value to [Tom] Kibler (Washington coach). It was he who drove through the Johnnies' line for the gains that gave Cavanaugh his opportunity to drop-kick for the points that gave the Maroon and Black the lead in the final quarter of the game at Annapolis. On one or two other occasions during the year he was brought behind the line to carry the ball for the Eastern Shoremen."

Keenan weighed about 305 pounds during the 1923 season, but was described as having "slowed down a lot" compared to prior years. As a result, he was not named to either the first or second-team All-Maryland team by The Baltimore Sun. He played his fourth season of collegiate football in 1924, but was not selected to the All-Maryland team, although The Sun wrote that Keenan was one of those who "may be singled out from among the guards of the state for special mention." A September 1924 article from The Evening Sun wrote the following, "There is something besides a joke in the playing of Ed Keenan, the big linesman. Keenan probably is the biggest man playing football today. The jokesters said he was big enough to play guard and tackle both. So he is. Another jokester said Washington College's plays were all around Keenan. They had to be. He's a big boy, and a flank attack is the best strategy. But seriously, while Keenan isn't at all fast, he is a powerful lineman, and he smashed up many a play Saturday. He even made some good tackles, once he gets in reach of a play, look out. Don't run any plays at Keenan. Keep them away from him." Keenan played his final season of college football in 1925 and had reached 320 pounds in weight, but despite his size, was not "the slowest man in the world by any means."

Throughout his career, Keenan was considered an "outstanding guard." He was described as an "imposing figure" on the field and was considered agile despite weighing over 300 pounds at certain points of his career. Sometimes he was also lined up at running back to "intimidate, if not liquidate, the opposition." He finished his college career a two-time All-Maryland selection, one-time All-South Atlantic selection and a Don Parker All-American.

Off the field, Keenan was a popular figure in his community. He also participated in local minstrel productions, took part in drama productions and sang in the college glee club.

== Professional career ==
=== New York Yankees and Hartford Blues ===
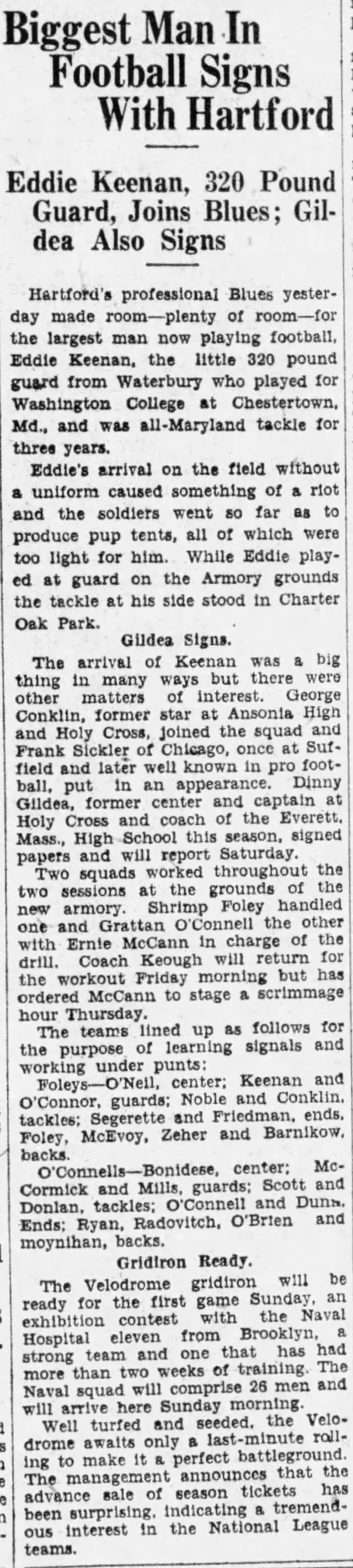
News article about Keenan signing with the Blues

After college, Keenan signed with Red Grange's New York Yankees of the American Football League (AFL); however, he was among a group of players who quit the team early, because, as he later said, "we weren't getting enough [money] to take a train home." He was living near Hartford, Connecticut, at the time, and so he signed a contract with the National Football League (NFL)'s Hartford Blues. The Blues had just been entered into the league and were one of 22 teams that played in the 1926 NFL season.

Keenan was officially signed by the Blues on September 14, and an article in the Hartford Courant wrote afterwards, "Hartford's professional Blues yesterday made room–plenty of room–for the largest man now playing football, Eddie Keenan the little 320 pound guard from Waterbury ... Eddie's arrival on the field without a uniform caused something of a riot and the soldiers went so far as to produce pup tents, all of which were too light for him ... The arrival of Keenan was a big thing in many ways."

The first Hartford football practices had Keenan as the starting left guard. The season began with an exhibition against the Brooklyn Naval Hospital on September 19, which the Blues won 33–7. He started the game as backup to Jack Bonadies, and later came in as a substitute for the latter, before being replaced by Ralph Nichols after playing for about 25 minutes. A report after the match said "Eddie Keenan was a noticeable figure. His 320-pounds graced about 25 minutes of the contest a[n]d the way he moved about surprised the onlookers. Eddie had to open big holes in the lines; there was no other way for him to move forward."

In the Hartford practices held up to their regular season opener, Keenan played as the first-team guard. The regular season for Hartford began on September 26, as they faced the New York Giants in their first-ever game of NFL play. 6,500 fans attended the match, played at the East Hartford Velodrome. On the first play of the game, Giants guard Doc Alexander fumbled and Hartford recovered at the 30-yard line. It was the only high point for the Blues, as they failed a field goal attempt on their ensuing drive and finished the game without a single first down, as New York won 21–0. Keenan started at right guard against the Giants before being replaced by Ralph Nichols.

On October 1, the Blues traveled to Philadelphia, for their game with the Frankford Yellow Jackets on October 2. A total of 15,000 fans packed Frankford Stadium and saw the Yellow Jackets defeat Hartford 13–0. When the game finished, both Frankford and the Blues caught trains heading to Hartford, where a second game between the two teams was played on October 3. Frankford won for the second consecutive time, this time by a score of 10–0. In both games, Keenan was the starting Hartford right guard.

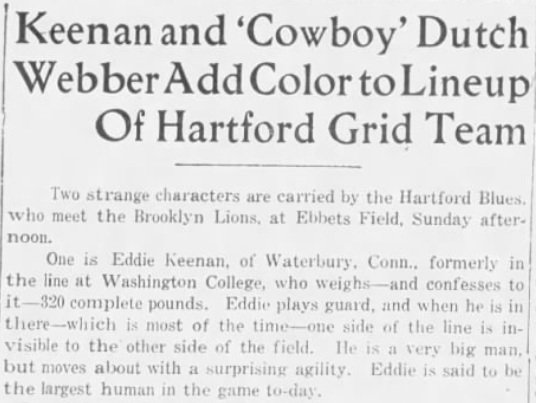
News article about Keenan

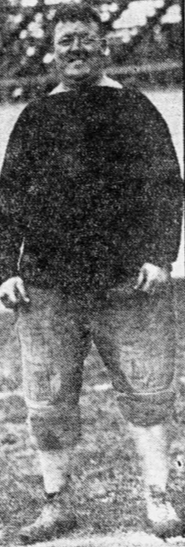
This image of Keenan ran in the Hartford Courant with the caption "Football's Big Boy"

On October 8, an article ran in The Standard Union which said the following, "Two strange characters are carried by the Hartford Blues ... One is Eddie Keenan, of Waterbury, Conn., formerly in the line at Washington College, who weighs–and confesses to it–320 complete pounds. Eddie plays guard, and when he is in there–which is most of the time–one side of the line is invisible to the other side of the field. He is a very big man, but moves about with a surprising agility. Eddie is said to be the largest human in the game to-day."

After cancelling a game with the Columbus Tigers scheduled for October 9, the Blues traveled to New York City to play the Brooklyn Lions at Ebbets Field on October 10. Before just 1,000 fans, the Blues lost their fourth straight game 0–6. Keenan was the starting left guard, with Mule Werwaiss taking his spot at right guard.

A game against the Providence Steamrollers scheduled for October 17 was canceled due to bad weather. The next game was on October 24, a rematch with the Brooklyn Lions. Less than 1,000 fans showed up for the game, which was played in a cold rainstorm. Keenan started at left guard in the game, a 16–6 win for Hartford which gave the Blues their first NFL victory. Dilly Dally later came into the match as a substitute for Keenan, and Keenan shortly afterwards came back as a substitute for Dally. Vic Radzievitch came in as a replacement for Keenan late in the game.

Hartford's sixth regular season game of the 1926 season was played against the Kansas City Cowboys on October 31. Just 500 fans showed up to attend the contest, which was played in pouring rain. At midfield, the water was ankle-high and the ball floated whenever it fell there. The amount of mud made the yard lines impossible to see and the players "quickly became anonymous" in dirty jerseys. The game ended in a 2–7 loss for Hartford, with the Cowboys scoring the only touchdown of the game early, on a fumble caused by a slippery ball. Keenan started at right guard in the match, and was described as "showing special courage in struggling through to down carries although he always went under the heap, with his face shoved many inches into the mire."

On November 7, the Blues played against the Canton Bulldogs at their home field. The kickoff was originally scheduled for 2:15 p.m., but it was postponed to 2:45 p.m. because of a parade. The Bulldogs bus left late and were caught in a traffic jam, only arriving at 3:00 p.m. 4,000 fans waited impatiently at the East Hartford Velodrome. Due to the late start, the inadequate lights at the stadium (which only effected the track around the playing field) had to be turned on in the fourth quarter. It had become dark by this time, and fans spilled onto the field along the sidelines trying to follow the action. With a little less than ten minutes remaining, Hartford was winning 16–7. A fight broke out between fans after a darkness-inspired trick play by Canton, leading to the game being called with eight minutes left to play, making the Blues winners 16–7. Keenan started at right guard in the game and a report the next day said the following, "Eddie Keenan, 320-pound guard from Waterbury, proved himself a real football player. Canton tried Keenan a few times but fell under more than a quarter ton of humanity."

On November 14, the Blues played the Buffalo Rangers, but lost 7–13. Keenan remained as starting right guard for the match. The subsequent game was played on November 21 against the 1–3–1 Dayton Triangles. Despite the Blues cutting several veteran players prior to their matchup with the Triangles, they won easily, 16–0, with Keenan starting at left guard. Joe Santone, an Italian playing in one of his two professional matches, came in as a substitute for Keenan mid-game.

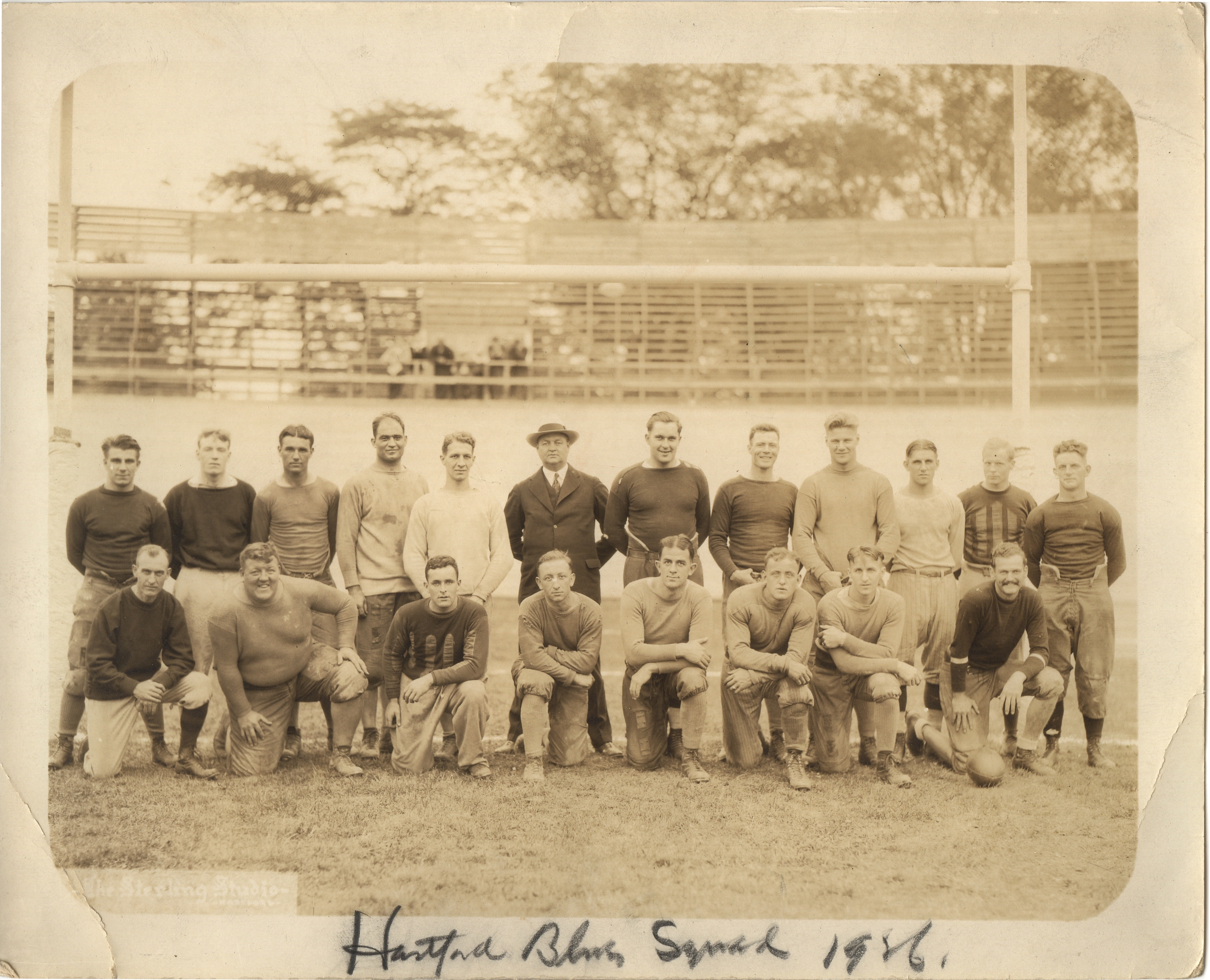
1926 Hartford Blues team photo - Keenan is second from the left, bottom row

Hartford's final regular season game was played on November 27 against the Duluth Eskimos. In a one-sided match, the Eskimos, led by Ernie Nevers, defeated the Blues 16–0. Keenan made his tenth consecutive start in the game, playing at left guard. The following day, the Blues played the All-New Britain team before 6,000 fans. He again was starting left guard, as the Blues won 10–2. Two more games were scheduled, against the Pottsville Maroons and Providence Steamrollers, but both were canceled.

The Hartford Blues finished the 1926 season with three wins and seven losses in NFL play, placing 13th in the league rankings. Keenan was a starter at either right or left guard in every game, and was said to have played "sturdy football" throughout the season for Hartford. He was one of only two Blues to appear in all ten games, and the only lineman.

After the season ended, Keenan requested a position on a local basketball team, but was told that "his presence on a basketball floor would prove objectionable to the spectators as they would be unable to see the game."

At the beginning of the 1927 football season, on October 14, Hartford, renamed the Giants, released Keenan. The Hartford Courant reported, "Eddie Keenan, the biggest football player in this state, was released last night by the Hartford Giants. Eddie's huge bulk was not necessary in the style of play which Coach Dave Hayes is developing and as the Giants have three running tackles in Sullivan, Connelly and Ike Wooley."

=== Later career ===
After being released by Hartford, Keenan signed with the New York Giants. He later recalled his time with New York in an interview with The Evening Sun: "Played with the Giants in '27 and '28. Four of us lived on Times Square for $2.50 a week. Steve Owen, Glenn Killinger and I don't even remember the other guy's name. With Cash & Carry Pyle, most of us got $10-$15. In Hartford, I got as much as $150. With the Giants, it was usually $30-$40. But living in New York, all we wanted was something to eat. I was in War One. You learn how to take care of yourself under those circumstances. To eat, we used to go around to the Irish boarding houses to find the best deals. They used to charge us 50 cents a piece. Guys like Owen and myself used to get our money's worth. I guess we did, anyway. They used to lock the doors when they'd see us coming back." The 1927 Giants were named NFL champions after compiling an 11–1–1 record.

In October 1928, Keenan played briefly with All-Torrington, reuniting him with several former Hartford teammates. He later joined the Nutmeg Athletic Club in November.

== Later life and death ==
Keenan remained an avid fan of football after his playing days. He often traveled by airplane across the country to watch the most important college and professional games of the week. After each season, Keenan selected his own College Football All-America Team, based mostly on his evaluation of games he had seen.

Keenan recalled his experiences in 1920s football through an interview with The Evening Sun in 1973, saying that the modern game "only slightly resembles what we played then."

In 1981, Keenan was inducted into the Washington College Sports Hall of Fame. He died three years later, on January 28, 1984, at the age of 89.
