= Edward Keenan =

Edward Keenan may refer to:

- Eddie Keenan, American football player
- Edward L. Keenan, American professor of history
- Edward A. Keenan, American politician, mayor of Burlington, Vermont
