= Jack Keogh =

American football player and coach (1886–1955)

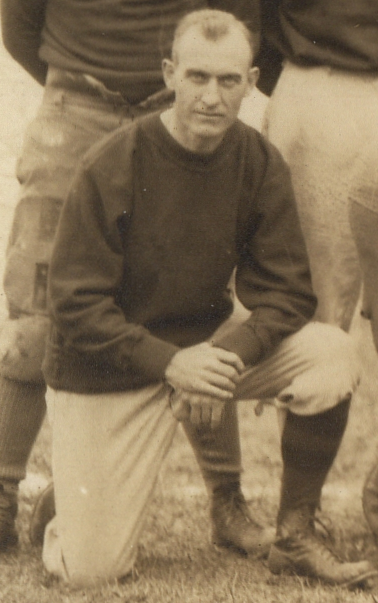

Personal information
- Born: June 17, 1886; South Hadley, Massachusetts, U.S.
- Died: February 13, 1955 (aged 68); Holyoke, Massachusetts, U.S.

Career information
- College: University of Pennsylvania

Career history
- 1926: Hartford Blues
- Coaching profile at Pro Football Reference

John Joseph Keogh (June 17, 1886 – February 13, 1955) was a professional football head coach for the Hartford Blues during their only season in the National Football League (NFL), in 1926. Prior to the 1926 season, Keogh was an assistant coach at the University of Pennsylvania. Outside of football, he worked as a dentist in Philadelphia. The contract offered to him by Blues owner George Mulligan was for $7,500 and allowed him to practice in that city three days each week.
