= 1924 Waterbury Blues season =

American football team season

- Head coach: Dick McGrath
- Home stadium: Brassco Field

Results
- Record: 7–2–4
- League place: independent team

The 1924 Waterbury Blues season was their first season in existence and their last complete season before relocating to Hartford midway through the 1925 season. The team finished the season with a 7–2–4 record.

== Schedule ==
Game	Date	Opponent	Result	Record
1	September 28	Fort Hamilton	W 57–0	1–0
2	October 5	Hartford National Guard	W 36–0	2–0
3	October 12	Meriden National Guard	W 14–0	3–0
4	October 19	All-Torrington	T 0–0	3–0–1
5	October 26	All-New Britain	T 0–0	3–0–2
6	November 2	All-Torrington	W 6–3	4–0–2
7	November 9	at All-New Britain	W 9–0	5–0–2
8	November 16, 1924	West Ends of Frog Hollow	W 6–0	6–0–2
9	November 23	Bridgeport	W 12–0	7–0–2
10	November 27	All-Torrington	T 0–0	7–0–3
10	November 30	at West Ends of Frog Hollow	T 0–0	7–0–4
11	December 7	Frankford Yellow Jackets	L 0–14	7–1–4
12	December 14	at Providence Steam Roller	L 0–9	7–2–4
