= Jappe =

Jappe is a surname. Notable people with the surname include:

- Paul Jappe (1898–1989), American football player
- Anselm Jappe (born 1962), German professor
