= Dutch Webber =

American football player (1901–1985)

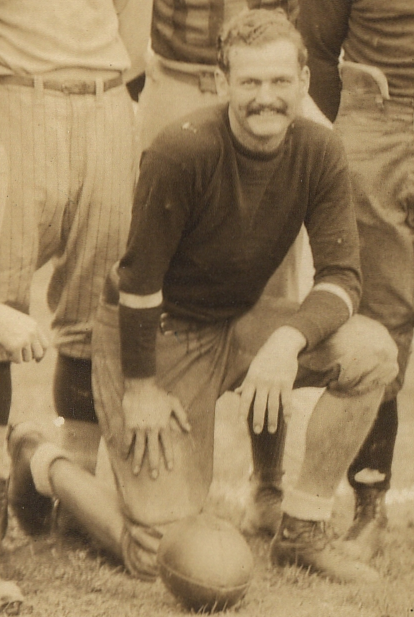

No. 8, 4
- Position: Running back

Personal information
- Born: December 15, 1901; Oxford, Nebraska, U.S.
- Died: June 15, 1985 (aged 83)
- Listed height: 6 ft 2 in (1.88 m)
- Listed weight: 190 lb (86 kg)

Career information
- College: Kansas State

Career history
- Kansas City Blues-Cowboys (1924–1925); Cleveland Bulldogs (1925); Hartford Blues (1926); New York Giants (1926); Kansas City Cowboys (1926); Cleveland Bulldogs (1927); Green Bay Packers (1928); Providence Steam Roller (1930); Newark Tornadoes (1930)

Career statistics
- Games played: 42
- Games started: 35
- Stats at Pro Football Reference

Howard Gilbert "Dutch" Webber was an American professional football player who played running back for four seasons for the Kansas City Blues Cowboys, Cleveland Bulldogs, Hartford Blues, New York Giants, Green Bay Packers, Newark Tornadoes, and Providence Steam Roller.
