= Hartford Chiefs =

- 1946–1952; Hartford, Connecticut

Minor league affiliations
- Class: Class A (1938–1952)
- League: Eastern League (1938–1952)

Major league affiliations
- Team: Boston Bees/Braves (1938–1952)

Team data
- Name: Hartford Chiefs (1946–1952); Hartford Bees (1939–1943; 1945); Hartford Laurels (1938; 1944)
- Ballpark: Bulkeley Stadium

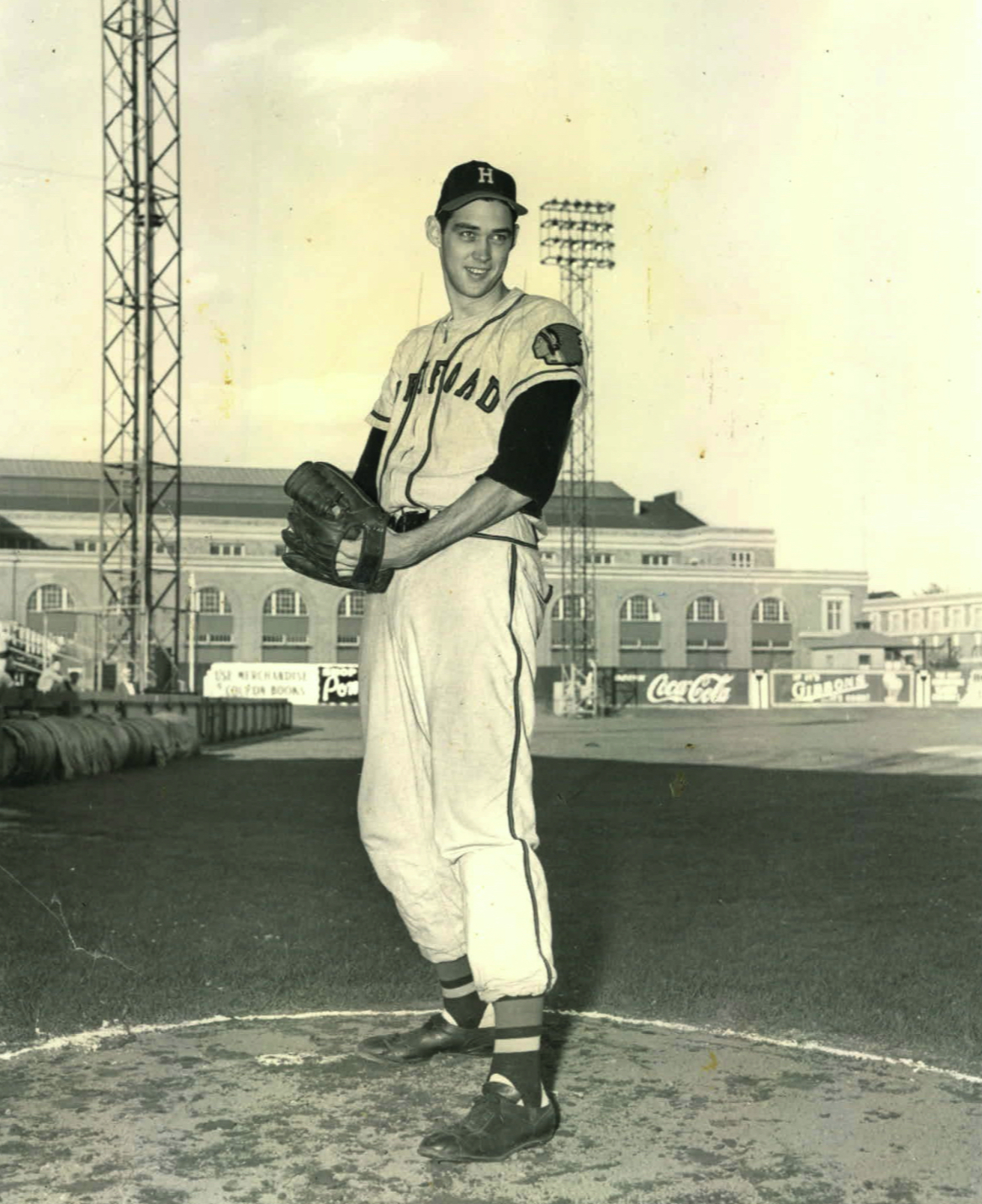
Gene Conley, Hartford Chiefs, 1951.

The Hartford Chiefs was the final name of the American minor league baseball franchise representing Hartford, Connecticut, that played in the Eastern League (then Class A) between 1938 and 1952. The Hartford franchise was an affiliate of the Boston Braves for each of its 15 seasons. It played at Bulkeley Stadium, and was known as the Bees from 1938 to 1945. It was also called the Laurels due to reporting by The Hartford Times, the city's afternoon newspaper. The 1944 Hartford club was recognized as one of the 100 greatest minor league teams of all time. The team was renamed the "Chiefs" in 1946, five years after its parent club, known as the Boston Bees from 1936–1940, reverted to its previous identity, the Braves.

== Long baseball tradition ==
The Connecticut capital had been in organized baseball since the Hartford Dark Blues were a charter member of the National League in 1876–77. After those two years in Major League Baseball, Hartford was represented in eleven different minor leagues — including three earlier versions of the "Eastern League." When the Class B Northeastern League folded after the 1934 season during the depths of the Great Depression, Hartford was without professional baseball for three seasons. Then Hartford joined the Class A New York–Pennsylvania League. The arrival of franchises in Hartford and Trenton, New Jersey, caused the NYPL to change its identity to the Eastern League in 1938, with 2012 marking the 75th consecutive season the league has used the name.

== Affiliate of Boston's NL franchise ==
The 1938 Laurels made the Eastern League playoffs and Hartford qualified for the postseason nine times in its 15-year history (including 1943–46 in succession), but the franchise never captured the league's playoff title. While the 1942 team included a future Baseball Hall of Fame pitcher, Warren Spahn, the Boston Bees/Braves of the era did not have an extensive player development system. Class A was prior to 1963 a higher-level circuit, close to today's Double-A ranking, and the Hartford franchise was the Braves' most advanced minor league affiliate through 1945. In 1946, however, the Braves began to build out their farm system, adding Triple-A and Double-A affiliates and expanding their presence in Classes B, C and D. They also worked with a second Class A farm club, the Denver Bears of the Western League, from 1949–51.

But after winning the 1948 National League pennant, the big-league Braves experienced a dramatic fall-off in attendance, and played their last season in Boston in 1952. The Hartford Chiefs did not survive them; the franchise was transferred to Wilkes-Barre, Pennsylvania, as an unaffiliated team for 1953. Meanwhile, the MLB Braves moved to Milwaukee, Wisconsin, during spring training of 1953. They had two Class A affiliates that season: the Lincoln Chiefs of the Western League—inheritors of the Hartford team's nickname—and the Jacksonville Braves of the Sally League, whose star player in 1953 would be 19-year-old Henry Aaron.

== Notable alumni ==
=== Baseball Hall of Fame alumni ===
- Travis Jackson (1951) Inducted, 1982
- Warren Spahn Inducted, 1973

=== Notable alumni ===
- Bob Buhl 2 x MLB All-Star
- Ripper Collins (1949–1950) 3 x MLB All-Star
- Gene Conley 4 x MLB All-Star
- George Crowe MLB All-Star
- Dick Donovan 5× MLB All-Star ;1961 AL ERA Leader
- Ernie Johnson
- Don Liddle
- Catfish Metkovich
- Bama Rowell
- Sibby Sisti
- Frank Torre
- Whitey Wietelmann

== Yearly record ==
Year	Record	Finish Full Season	Attendance	Manager	Postseason
1938	67–67	Fourth	60,442	Eddie Onslow	Lost to Hazleton in first round
1939	58–82	Seventh (tied)	53,984	Fresco Thompson	DNQ
1940	72–66	Third	75,399	Jack Onslow	Lost to Binghamton in finals
1941	54–81	Seventh	66,529	Jack Onslow; Don Manno	DNQ
1942	62–78	Seventh	68,842	Del Bissonette	DNQ
1943	77–59	Third	54,854	Del Bissonette	Lost to Scranton in first round
1944	99–38	First	116,265	Del Bissonette	Lost to Utica in first round
1945	68–67	Fourth	97,557	Merle Settlemire	Lost to Wilkes-Barre in first round
1946	71–67	Fourth	140,249	Dutch Dorman	Lost to Scranton in finals
1947	58–82	Sixth	92,397	Dutch Dorman	DNQ
1948	74–67	Fourth	122,563	Earl Browne	Lost to Albany in first round
1949	66–74	Fifth	138,306	Earl Browne; Ripper Collins	DNQ
1950	80–59	Third	84,159	Ripper Collins	Lost to Wilkes-Barre in first round
1951	75–65	Fourth	106,801	Tommy Holmes; Travis Jackson	Lost to Scranton in first round
1952	59–79	Seventh	36,281	Del Bissonette	DNQ

== 2016 return to Eastern League ==
In 2015, after more than six decades without a team in organized baseball, Hartford officials led by then-mayor Pedro Segarra proposed building a new baseball stadium (to be known as Dunkin' Donuts Park) in the city's North End to attract the nearby New Britain Rock Cats of the modern Double-A Eastern League. The renamed Hartford Yard Goats debuted in 2016 but played the entire season on the road — with some games moved to Norwich, 40 miles (64 km) to the southeast — because of construction delays. Despite continued problems in completing the stadium, the team began play in Hartford's new ballpark in 2017.
