= Vincent Lacava =

American football coach and general manager

Dr. Vincent D. Lacava was a semi-professional football coach and general manager in 1927 for the Hartford Giants. The team had previously been known as the Hartford Blues and played in the National Football League (NFL), the year prior. However, after the Blues' 1926 season, the NFL's owners voted to streamline the league and cut back from 22 to 12 teams. As a result, half of the 1926 NFL teams were scrapped, including Hartford. So in 1927, Blues' owner George Mulligan created the Hartford Giants, a semi-pro team with many of the players from the Blues, however the Giants folded after the season.

Under Lacava, surviving team records show that the Giants posted a 7–1 record, losing only a State Championship Series game to New Britain on November 20, 1927. The Championship series Game 3 was cancelled on December 4, 1927, due to a dispute between the New Britain and the Giants. The Giants permanently disbanded shortly after.
