= Obie Bristow =

American football player (1900–1969)

Profile
- Positions: Wingback, halfback

Personal information
- Born: April 17, 1900; Pryor, Oklahoma, U.S.
- Died: December 22, 1969 (aged 69); Big Spring, Texas, U.S.
- Listed height: 6 ft 2 in (1.88 m)
- Listed weight: 210 lb (95 kg)

Career information
- High school: Pryor
- College: Central Oklahoma, Oklahoma

Career history
- Cleveland Bulldogs (1925); Hartford Blues (1925); Kansas City Cowboys (1925–1926)

Career statistics
- Games played: 17
- Games started: 15

Jessie Gordon "Obie" Bristow (April 17, 1900 – December 22, 1969) was an American football player and coach, state legislator, and oil operator. He played professionally in the early National Football League (NFL) for the Cleveland Bulldogs and the Kansas City Cowboys. He was also a professional player for the Hartford Blues, prior to that team's entry into the NFL in 1926. Prior to his pro career, Bristow played college football and baseball at the University of Oklahoma. He earned a letter with the team in 1922. He also lettered on the baseball team.

Bristow later coached the football team at Big Spring High School in Big Spring, Texas for four years. He served as a member of the Democratic Party in the Texas House of Representatives from 1953 to 1959 and later worked as an independent oil operator. He was found dead by hanging on December 22, 1969, in Big Spring. His death was ruled a suicide.
