= Nate Share =

American football player (1903–1950)

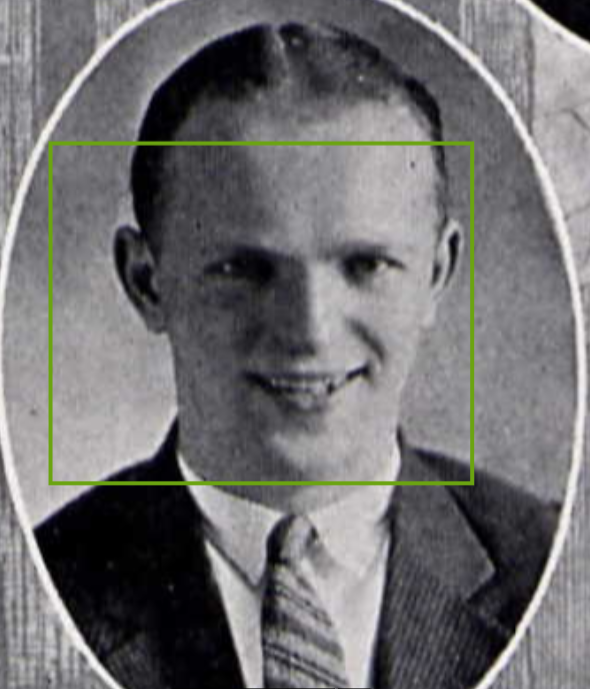
- Nate Share, 1925

No. 4
- Positions: Guard, tackle

Personal information
- Born: November 17, 1903; New York City
- Died: January 15, 1950 (aged 46)
- Listed height: 6 ft 1 in (1.85 m)
- Listed weight: 210 lb (95 kg)

Career information
- High school: English (Boston, MA)
- College: Tufts

Career history
- Providence Steam Roller (1925); Brooklyn Horsemen (1926)

Nathan Louis Share (November 17, 1903 – January 15, 1950) was an American football player.

Share was born in 1904, the son of Russian immigrants. He attended The English High School in Boston. He enrolled at Tufts College and played college football there from 1921 to 1924. He also played for the Tufts basketball team as a senior and was active in dramatics. He graduated from Tufts in 1925 with a bachelor of science degree in civil engineering.

He played at the guard and tackle positions in the National Football League (NFL) for the Providence Steam Roller in 1925. He appeared in 10 NFL games, all 10 as a starter. He was described as "the star" of the 1929 Steam Roller team. He played for Providence while simultaneously attending Harvard Law School. Share also played for the Brooklyn Horsemen of the American Football League in 1926.

In 1940, Share was living in The Bronx and working as a civil engineer in government work. He died in 1950 at age 46.
