= Grattan O'Connell =

American football player (1902–1942)

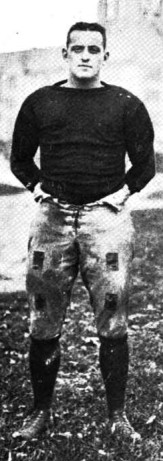
- O'Connell, c. 1924

No. 5
- Position: End

Personal information
- Born: October 27, 1902; Thomaston, Connecticut, U.S.
- Died: March 14, 1942 (aged 39); Simsbury, Connecticut, U.S.
- Listed height: 5 ft 11 in (1.80 m)
- Listed weight: 185 lb (84 kg)

Career information
- High school: Bristol Central (Bristol, Connecticut); Dean Academy (Franklin, Massachusetts)
- College: Boston College

Career history
- Hartford Blues (1925–1926); Providence Steam Roller (1927)

Career NFL statistics
- Games played: 12
- Games started: 12

John Grattan O'Connell (October 27, 1902 – March 14, 1942) was an American professional football player and sportswriter. He played two seasons in the National Football League (NFL) from 1926 to 1927. He played for the Hartford Blues during the 1926 season and the Providence Steam Roller during the 1927 season.

Prior to his professional career, O'Connell played college football at Boston College. There he started every game of his four-year football career with the Eagles. O'Connell once blocked six kicks in a game while at BC and earned All-American honors during his junior year. He also played for the school's basketball team.

O'Connell was a cartoonist and contributed to The Heights while at Boston College. He was later a sportswriter for the Hartford Courant. O'Connell died on March 14, 1942, at his home in Simsbury, Connecticut.

In 1971, O'Connell was inducted into the Boston College Varsity Club Athletic Hall of Fame.
