= Chuck Corgan =

American baseball and football player (1902–1928)

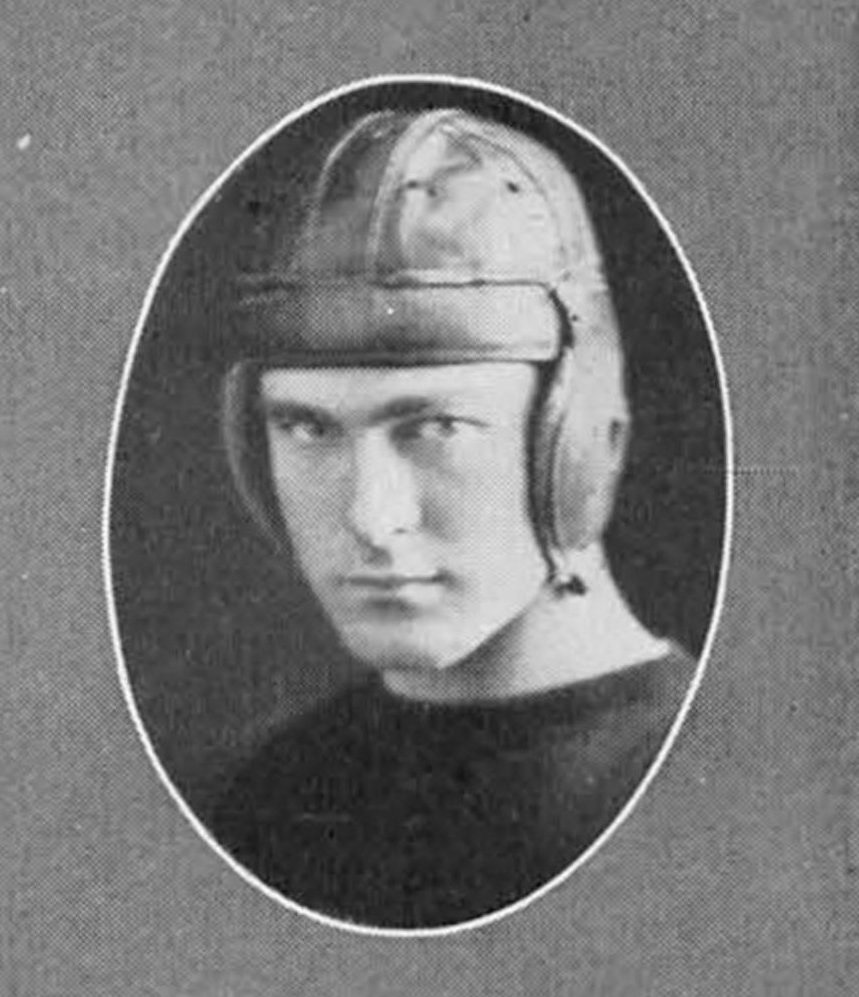
- Shortstop / Second baseman
- Born: December 4, 1902; Wagoner, Oklahoma, U.S.
- Died: June 13, 1928 (aged 25); Wagoner, Oklahoma, U.S.
- Batted: Switch Threw: Right

MLB debut
- September 19, 1925, for the Brooklyn Robins

Last MLB appearance
- October 1, 1927, for the Brooklyn Robins

MLB statistics
- Batting average: .221
- Home runs: 0
- Runs batted in: 1
- Stats at Baseball Reference

Teams
- Brooklyn Robins (1925, 1927)

Charles Howard Corgan (December 4, 1902 – June 13, 1928) was an American professional baseball and football player. In baseball, he played the infield for the Brooklyn Robins during the 1925 and 1927 seasons. He also played football for the Kansas City Blues/Cowboys, Hartford Blues and New York Giants from 1924 to 1927. He attended college at the University of Arkansas. He died from cancer in 1928.

== Early life ==
Corgan was born in 1902 in Wagoner, Oklahoma. He attended Wagoner High School, where he played baseball, basketball and football. He had six siblings, including four brothers, all of whom played baseball at Wagoner High School. His brother Marsh played baseball in the Western Association before being elected Wagoner County Sheriff and becoming the youngest sheriff in the nation. His brother Roy played and managed in the Western Association.

Corgan played college football at the University of Arkansas. He played end on the same team as Wagoner native Elza T. Renfro. Corgan and Renfro also played basketball together for Arkansas.

== Career ==
Between 1924 and 1927, Corgan played 30 games as an end or blocking back in the National Football League for the Kansas City Blues/Cowboys, Hartford Blues and New York Giants.

Corgan's baseball career began to attract attention in the Western League in 1925. The Brooklyn Robins purchased his contract that year. He played 33 major league games for the Robins, mostly as a second baseman or shortstop, in 1925 and 1927. He reported to spring training before the 1928 season, but he had developed abdominal cancer and was too ill to continue playing. He was hospitalized in Rochester in early summer, but he went home to Wagoner a few days before he died on June 13, 1928.
