= Paul Jappe =

American football player (1898–1989)

No. 22, 17, 28
- Positions: End, guard, tackle

Personal information
- Born: January 16, 1898; Union Hill, New Jersey, U.S.
- Died: April 1, 1989 (aged 91); Daytona Beach, Florida, U.S.
- Listed height: 6 ft 1 in (1.85 m)
- Listed weight: 195 lb (88 kg)

Career information
- High school: Commercial (Brooklyn, New York)
- College: Syracuse

Career history
- New York Giants (1925); Brooklyn Lions (1926); New York Giants (1927–1928)

Awards and highlights
- NFL champion (1927)
- Stats at Pro Football Reference

Paul Eugene Jappe (January 16, 1898 – April 1, 1989) was an American professional football player who played four seasons in the National Football League (NFL) with the New York Giants and Brooklyn Lions. He played college football at Syracuse University. He was a member of the Giants team that won the 1927 NFL Championship.

== Early life and college ==
Paul Eugene Jappe was born on January 16, 1898, in Union Hill, New Jersey. He attended Commercial High School in Brooklyn, New York.

Jappe played college football for the Syracuse Orange of Syracuse University. He was on the freshman team in 1920 and was a three-year letterman from 1921 to 1923. He was also a member of the Syracuse Orange men's crew from 1920 to 1924.

== Professional career ==
Jappe played in all 12 games, starting nine, for the New York Giants of the National Football League (NFL) during the team's inaugural 1925 season. The Giants finished the year with an 8–4, good for fourth place in the NFL.

Jappe started all 11 games for the Brooklyn Lions of the NFL in 1926 as the Lions went 3–8.

Jappe returned to the Giants in 1927 and appeared in all 13 games, starting one, for New York that year. The Giants finished the 1927 season in first place in the league with an 11–1–1 record. Jappe played in 12 games, starting seven, during his final season in the NFL in 1928.

== Personal life ==
Jappe died on April 1, 1989, in Daytona Beach, Florida.

== Jim Frugone ==
Jappe and high school teammate, Jim Frugone, played together at Syracuse, and also on the 1925 Giants.
