= Jim Frugone =

American football player (1897–1972)

No. 9, 6
- Position: Tailback

Personal information
- Born: October 23, 1897; Brooklyn, New York, U.S.
- Died: June 7, 1972 (aged 74); New York, New York, U.S.
- Listed height: 5 ft 10 in (1.78 m)
- Listed weight: 165 lb (75 kg)

Career information
- High school: Commercial (Brooklyn)
- College: Syracuse (1919–1922)

Career history
- New York Giants (1925); Brooklyn Horsemen (1926)
- Stats at Pro Football Reference

James Gregory Frugone (October 23, 1897 – June 7, 1972) was an American professional tailback tailback who played one season with the New York Giants of the National Football League (NFL). He played college football at Syracuse University.

== Early life and college ==
James Gregory Frugone was born on October 23, 1897, in Brooklyn, New York. He attended Commercial High School in Brooklyn. Frugone and high school teammate, Paul Jappe, played together at Syracuse, and also on the 1925 New York Giants.

Frugone was a member of the Syracuse Orange of Syracuse University from 1919 to 1922 and a three-year letterman from 1920 to 1922.

== Professional career ==
Frugone signed with the New York Giants of the National Football League in 1925. He played in three games for the Giants during the 1925 season. He became a free agent after the season. Frugone wore jersey number 9 with the Giants.

He played in four games, starting two, for the Brooklyn Horsemen of the American Football League in 1926. He wore number 6 while with the Horsemen.

== Death ==
Frugone died on June 7, 1972, in New York City.
