= Earl Britton =

American football player (1903–1973)

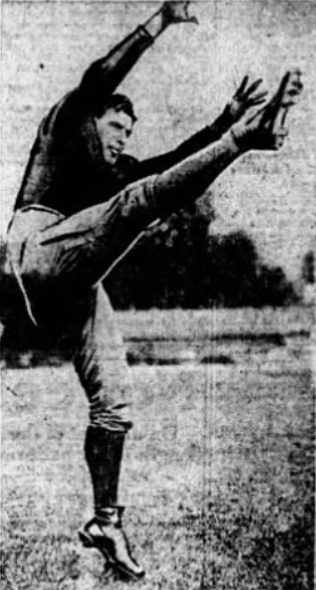

Profile
- Positions: Fullback, placekicker, punter

Personal information
- Born: July 15, 1903; Elgin, Illinois, U.S.
- Died: October 24, 1973 (aged 70)
- Listed height: 6 ft 3 in (1.91 m)
- Listed weight: 212 lb (96 kg)

Career information
- High school: Elgin (IL)
- College: Illinois

Career history
- Chicago Bears (1925); Brooklyn Lions (1926); Dayton Triangles (1927); Frankford Yellow Jackets (1927); Dayton Triangles (1928); Chicago Cardinals (1929)

Awards and highlights
- National champion (1923); Elgin Sports Hall of Fame (1980)

Career statistics
- Games played: 31
- Games started: 22
- Field goals: 1
- Stats at Pro Football Reference

Earl Tanner Britton (July 15, 1903 – October 24, 1973) was a professional American football fullback who played in the National Football League (NFL) and the American Football League (AFL). Born in Elgin, Illinois, he attended Elgin High School and played college football at the University of Illinois at Urbana–Champaign.

Britton was 6 ft 3 in (1.91 m) tall and weighed 212 lb (15 st 2 lb; 96 kg).

His career as a placekicker/punter lasted from 1925 to 1929. He played for the Chicago Bears, the Brooklyn Lions, the Dayton Triangles, the Frankford Yellow Jackets, and the Chicago Cardinals.

Earl was the son of Benjamin Harold Britton and Edna May Tanner. He was a first cousin to music educator Allen Perdue Britton.
