= Red Howard =

American football player (1900–1973)

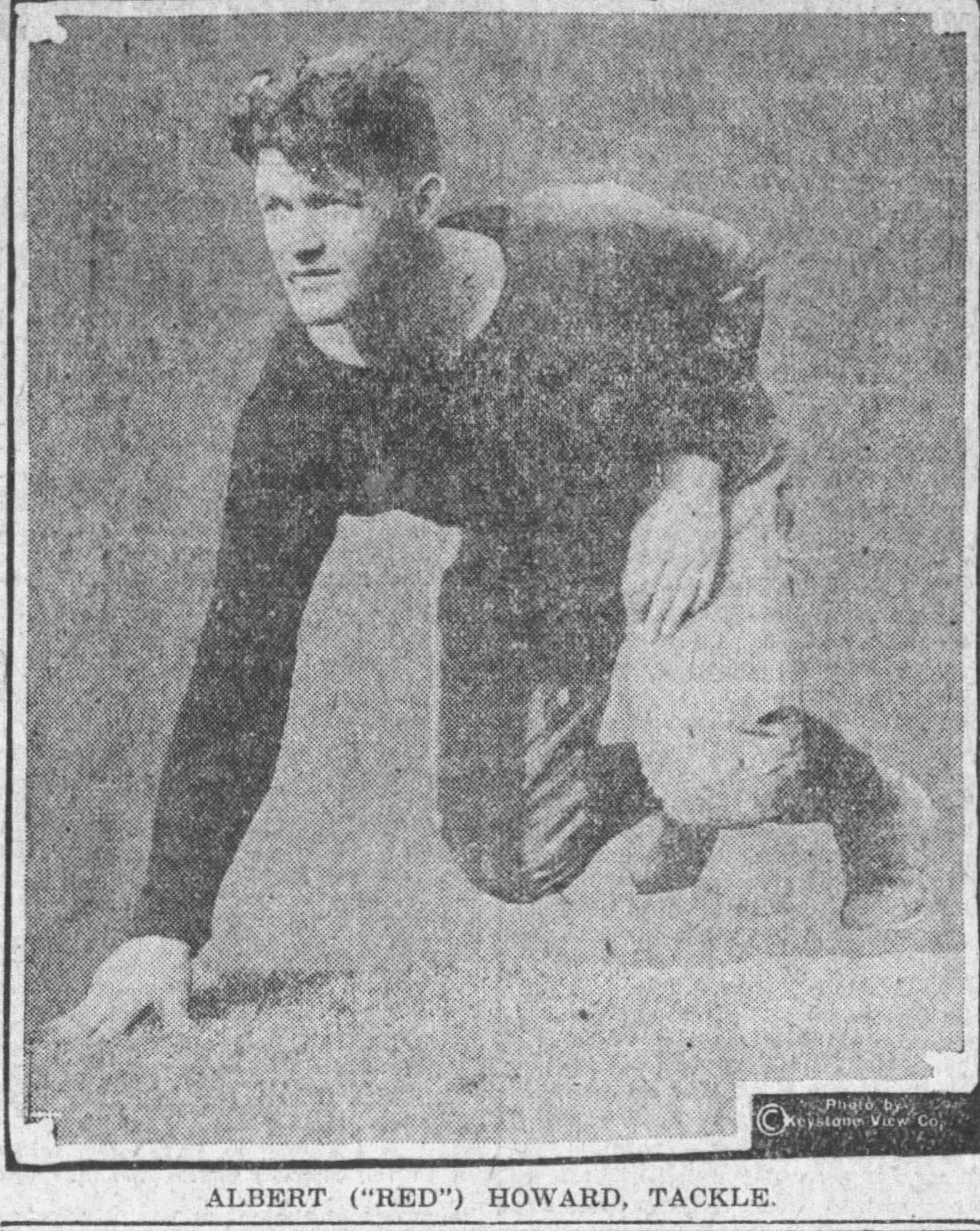

No. 10, 24
- Position: Guard

Personal information
- Born: November 23, 1900; Haverhill, Massachusetts, U.S.
- Died: May 29, 1973 (aged 72); Essex Fells, New Jersey, U.S.
- Listed height: 5 ft 11 in (1.80 m)
- Listed weight: 192 lb (87 kg)

Career information
- High school: Haverhill
- College: Princeton (1922–1924)

Career history
- Brooklyn Horsemen (1926); Brooklyn Lions (1926); New York Giants (1927)

Awards and highlights
- NFL champion (1927)
- Stats at Pro Football Reference

Albert Franklin "Red" Howard (November 23, 1900 – May 29, 1973) was an American football guard who played two seasons in the National Football League (NFL) with the Brooklyn Lions and New York Giants. He was also a member of the Brooklyn Horsemen of the American Football League (AFL). Howard played college football for the Princeton Tigers.

== Amateur career ==
Howard attended Haverhill High School in Haverhill, Massachusetts. He first enrolled at New Hampshire College of Agriculture and the Mechanic Arts (which became the University of New Hampshire in 1923) where he was captain of the freshman football team in 1919. He transferred to Princeton University in 1920, where he played for the varsity Tigers football team for the 1922 through 1924 seasons. He also played lacrosse at Princeton, and earned a B.S. degree there in 1925.

== Professional career ==
Howard played in four games for the Brooklyn Horsemen of the American Football League in 1926. The Horsemen merged with the Brooklyn Lions of the National Football League on November 12, 1926, and he played in three games for the Lions during the 1926 NFL season.

Howard played in one game for the 1927 New York Giants.

== Personal life ==
Howard served in the United States Navy from 1917 to 1919. In 1923, Howard's father captured a young Bengal tiger while in India on an expedition, and sent it to Princeton as a mascot. Howard was married in 1926.
