= Ted Drews =

American football player (1902–1982)

Profile
- Position: Wide receiver

Personal information
- Born: December 15, 1902; Chicago, Illinois
- Died: April 15, 1982 (aged 79)

Career information
- College: Princeton University

Career history
- 1926: Brooklyn Lions
- 1928: Chicago Bears

Theodore "Ted" W. Drews (December 15, 1902 – April 15, 1982) was an American football player who played wide receiver for two seasons for the Chicago Bears and Brooklyn Lions. He had previously been a pentathlon champion. He graduated from Princeton University in 1925. He worked as an educator and football coach in Lawrence Township, Mercer County, New Jersey. He was married to Gloria Beard Drews for 53 years. He died on April 15, 1982 in Daytona Beach, Florida.
