= Ed Harrison (American football) =

American football player (1902–1981)

Personal information
- Born: December 3, 1902; New York City
- Died: May 1981 (aged 78); Bronxville, New York
- Listed height: 6 ft 0 in (1.83 m)
- Listed weight: 178 lb (81 kg)

Career information
- College: Boston College

Career history
- Brooklyn Lions (1926)

Edward A. Harrison (December 3, 1902-May, 1981) was an American professional football player who spend one season in the National Football League with the Brooklyn Lions in 1926, appearing in three games while making one start.
