= Dick Marsh =

American football player (1907–1964)

Victor Burton "Dick" Marsh
No. 33
- Position: Guard

Personal information
- Born: August 29, 1906; Sayre, Oklahoma, U.S.
- Died: January 20, 1968 (aged 61); Caddo Parish, Louisiana, U.S.
- Listed height: 6 ft 2 in (1.88 m)
- Listed weight: 210 lb (95 kg)

Career information
- High school: Sayre Public Schools
- College: Phillips University

Career history
- New York Giants (1933)
- Stats at Pro Football Reference

Victor Burton "Dick" Marsh (August 29, 1906 – January 23, 1968) was an American football player for the National Football League (NFL). During the 1933 season he played for the New York Giants.

== Career ==
Marsh was born in Sayre, Beckham County, Oklahoma, USA on August 29, 1906, to Orris McCartney Marsh (1876–1940) and Gertrude Maude Marsh (1877–1964). He attended grammar school and high school in Sayre, graduating in 1925. He went on to study at Phillips University and gained a degree in petroleum engineering from the University of Oklahoma.

He was a member of the university football team and lettered in football during his time at Phillips. He gained his coaches' certificate, and after graduating he became assistant coach at Phillips. He also worked in the Beckham County National Bank as a teller, and for the California Oil Company in the engineering department.

He played professional football in the NFL for the New York Giants in 1933. He also played for the Paterson Giants (IFL) in the same year. In 1934 he was selected as the most outstanding former student.

In November 1933 he was appointed as superintendent of an Oklahoma Carbon Industry chemical plant. In July 1936 he married Miss Loraine Patrick and they settled in Chandler, Oklahoma where Marsh worked for the Stanolind Oil Company. The couple had two daughters, Kathryn and Margaret. Marsh was elected president of the Rotary club in the same year.

His wife Loraine died in 1946, and in 1947 Marsh married Georgia Hargrove. Marsh died on January 23, 1968, in Caddo Parish, Louisiana, predeceasing his second wife, and was buried in Sayre-Doxey Cemetery.
