= Art Garvey =

American football player (1900–1973)

No. 55
- Position: Lineman

Personal information
- Born: February 20, 1900; St. Louis, Missouri, U.S.
- Died: September 22, 1973 (aged 73); Chicago, Illinois, U.S.
- Listed height: 6 ft 1 in (1.85 m)
- Listed weight: 235 lb (107 kg)

Career information
- College: Notre Dame

Career history
- Chicago Bears (1922–1923); Waterbury Blues (1924–1925); Brooklyn Lions (1926); Brooklyn Horsemen (1926); Hartford Blues (1926); New York Yankees (1926); New York Giants (1927–1928); Providence Steam Roller (1929); Brooklyn Dodgers (1930); Staten Island Stapletons (1931)
- Stats at Pro Football Reference

Arthur Aloysius "Hec" Garvey (February 20, 1900 — September 22, 1973) was a professional American football lineman. He played for nine teams in three leagues (APFA, NFL, AFL) over nine seasons.

== Biography ==
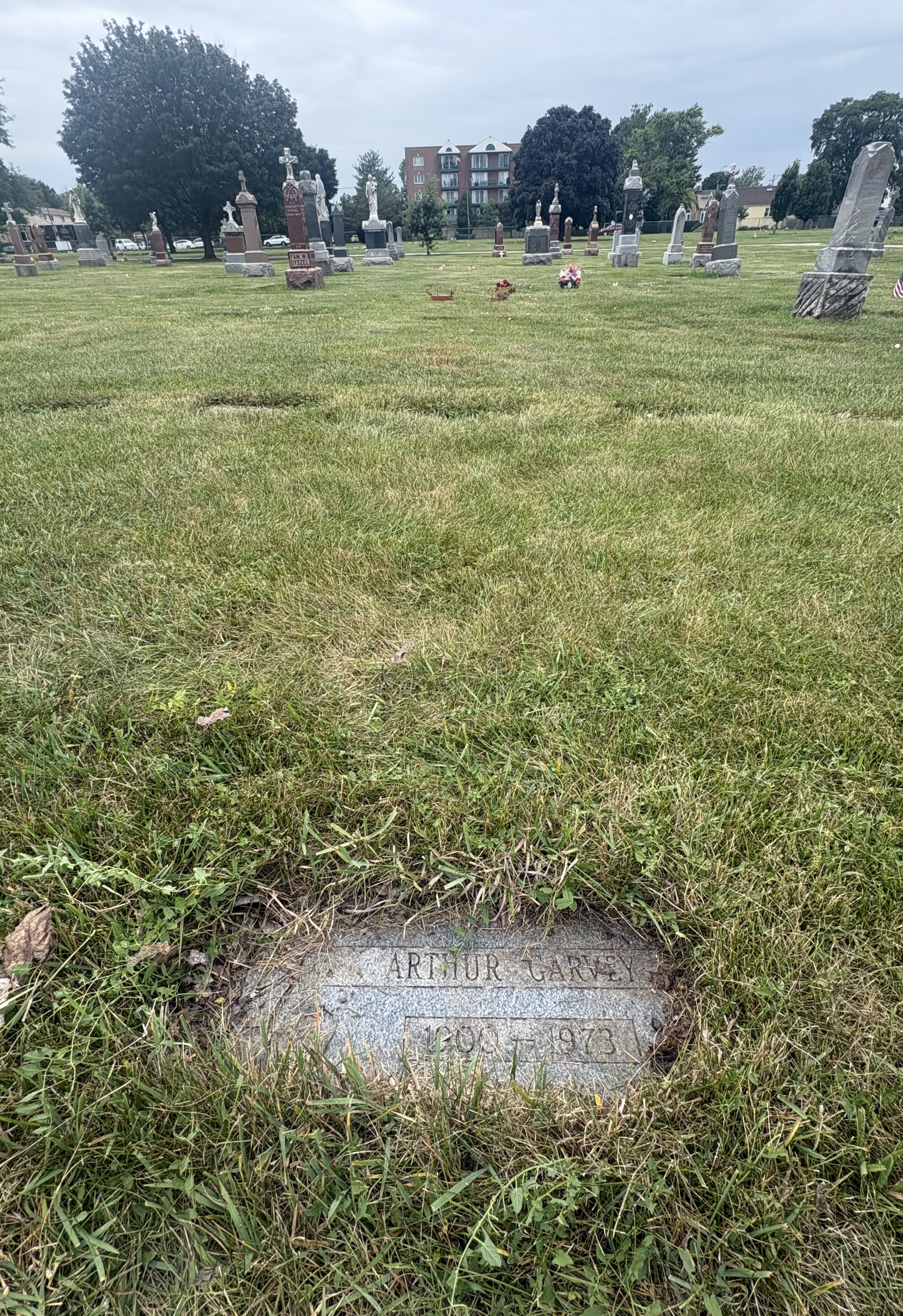
Garvey's grave at St. Adalbert Cemetery

Art Garvey was born in St. Louis on February 20, 1900.

He died at his home in Chicago on September 22, 1973, and was buried at St. Adalbert Cemetery in Niles, Illinois.
