= Dick McGrath =

American football player and coach (1901–1965)

Profile
- Positions: Center, Tackle

Personal information
- Born: June 30, 1901; Winthrop, Massachusetts, U.S.
- Died: October 23, 1965 (aged 64); Virginia Beach, Virginia, U.S.
- Listed height: 5 ft 11 in (1.80 m)
- Listed weight: 190 lb (86 kg)

Career information
- College: Holy Cross

Career history

Playing
- 1925: Waterbury Blues
- 1926: Brooklyn Lions

Coaching
- 1925: Waterbury Blues

Richard James McGrath (June 30, 1901 – October 23, 1965) was a professional football player in the early National Football League (NFL) for the Brooklyn Lions. He also played professionally for the Waterbury Blues in 1925, prior to the club's entry into the NFL in 1926 as the Hartford Blues. He served the Blues, not only as the team's captain, but also as its coach. Prior to his professional career, McGrath played college football for the Holy Cross Crusaders
