= Elmer McCormick =

American football player (1898–1951)

Profile
- Position: Center

Personal information
- Born: October 27, 1898; Hartford, Connecticut
- Died: February 4, 1951 (aged 52); Springfield, Massachusetts
- Listed height: 5 ft 7 in (1.70 m)
- Listed weight: 220 lb (100 kg)

Career information
- High school: St. John's Prep (MA)
- College: University of Detroit, Canisius College

Career history
- Buffalo All-Americans (1923); Buffalo Bisons (1924–1925); Frankford Yellow Jackets (1925); Hartford Blues (1926)

Awards and highlights
- First-team All-Pro (1924)

Elmer Francis McCormick (October 27, 1898 – February 4, 1951) was an American football player. He played four seasons in the National Football League (NFL) as a center for the Buffalo All-Americans (1923), Buffalo Bisons (1924–1925), Frankford Yellow Jackets (1925), and Hartford Blues (1926). He was selected as the first-team center on the 1924 All-Pro Team.
