= Hartford Blues =

Historical American football team

General information
- Founded: 1924
- Folded: 1927
- Stadium: Brassco Field (1924–1925); Clarkin Field (1925); East Hartford Velodrome (1926–1927)
- Headquartered: Hartford, Connecticut, USA (1925–1927); Waterbury, Connecticut, USA (1924–1925)
- Colors: Blue, white (1924–1926) Black, orange (1927)

Personnel
- Owner: George Mulligan
- Head coach: Dick McGrath (1924–1925); Jack Keogh (1926); Vincent Lacava (1927)

Nickname
- "George Mulligan's Blues"

Team history
- Waterbury Blues (1924–1925); Hartford Blues (1925–1926); Hartford Giants (1927)

League / conference affiliations
- National Football League (1926); Independent (1924–1925, 1927)

The Hartford Blues of the National Football League played only in the 1926 NFL season, with a record of 3–7. The team was based in Hartford, Connecticut but played at the Velodrome in East Hartford.

== History ==
=== Independent history (1924-1925) ===
==== 1924 season ====
The team was founded in 1924 by sports promoter George Mulligan as the Waterbury Blues, in Waterbury, Connecticut. The Blues where one of five professional football teams in the state, however, due to Mulligan's financial support only two of them really challenged the Blues for the title of best in the state, the All-New Britain in New Britain, and the West Siders, in Hartford. All five teams hired local men, both former college players and sandlotters, on a per-game wage, however, the NFL could only support one team from the state.

In order to attract attention to his team, Mulligan paid a then unprecedented $7,500 contract and $500 signing bonus for Harry Stuhldreher, one of Notre Dame's Four Horsemen. He became the first high-profile football player to sign to any of the Connecticut teams, while Mulligan also signed players from Holy Cross, Villanova, as well as Ed "Hec" Garvey, a professional player for the Chicago Bears. After defeating a team from Yonkers, New York, Mulligan signed another of the Horsemen Jim Crowley to defeat a team from Adams, Massachusetts.

Meanwhile, the All-New Britain had thoroughly defeated the Hartford West Siders with the Hartford Courant reporting that the West Siders where contemplating moving out of the city to save on costs. The Blues would only play one NFL franchise in their 1924 season, the Rochester Jeffersons, defeating them 7–6. At the end of the season the West Siders would again play All-New Britain, this time with a totally new team, and lost 3–0, with the West Siders folding shortly after, and with Mulligan immediately picking up their lease on Clarkin Field, relocating the team as the Hartford Blues.

==== 1925 season ====
Their first game of the 1925 season would be a rematch against the Jeffersons, with the Blues again winning 8–6, however, the team struggled to gain attendance, garnering a crowd of just 2,000. All-New Britain and the Blues would play a 'State Championship' for bragging rights, with the Blues going into the game undefeated, but losing 6–0. All-New Britain then looked to break into the NFL, however, lost to the Frankford Yellow Jackets, while the Blues where unable to field a team on Thanksgiving Day, with Mulligan convincing the Cleveland Bulldogs and Kansas City Cowboys to play a game at Clarkin, which proved to be an embarrassment for the NFL, as the defending league champions, the Bulldogs, only drew a crowd of 1,100, while a simultaneous game at Wrigley Field between the Chicago Bears and Chicago Cardinals saw a crowd of 40,000. However, since that loss ended the season for the Cowboys, several of their players would sign on with the Blues to finish their season including Obie Bristow and guard Steve Owen.

The following week Mulligan scheduled a rematch against All-New Britain, signing a third horseman, Don Miller, defeating them 28–7 as All-New Britain ended their season there, while the Blues continued to play against club teams in Massachusetts, playing a game in Fenway Park, but without Miller and Stuhldreher, who were playing alongside other Notre-Dame alumni against the Pottsville Maroons. The Blue's season finale would be against the Bulldogs, with Mulligan signing the remaining horsemen Elmer Layden, for a one-game contract, although losing 13–6.

=== NFL season (1926) ===
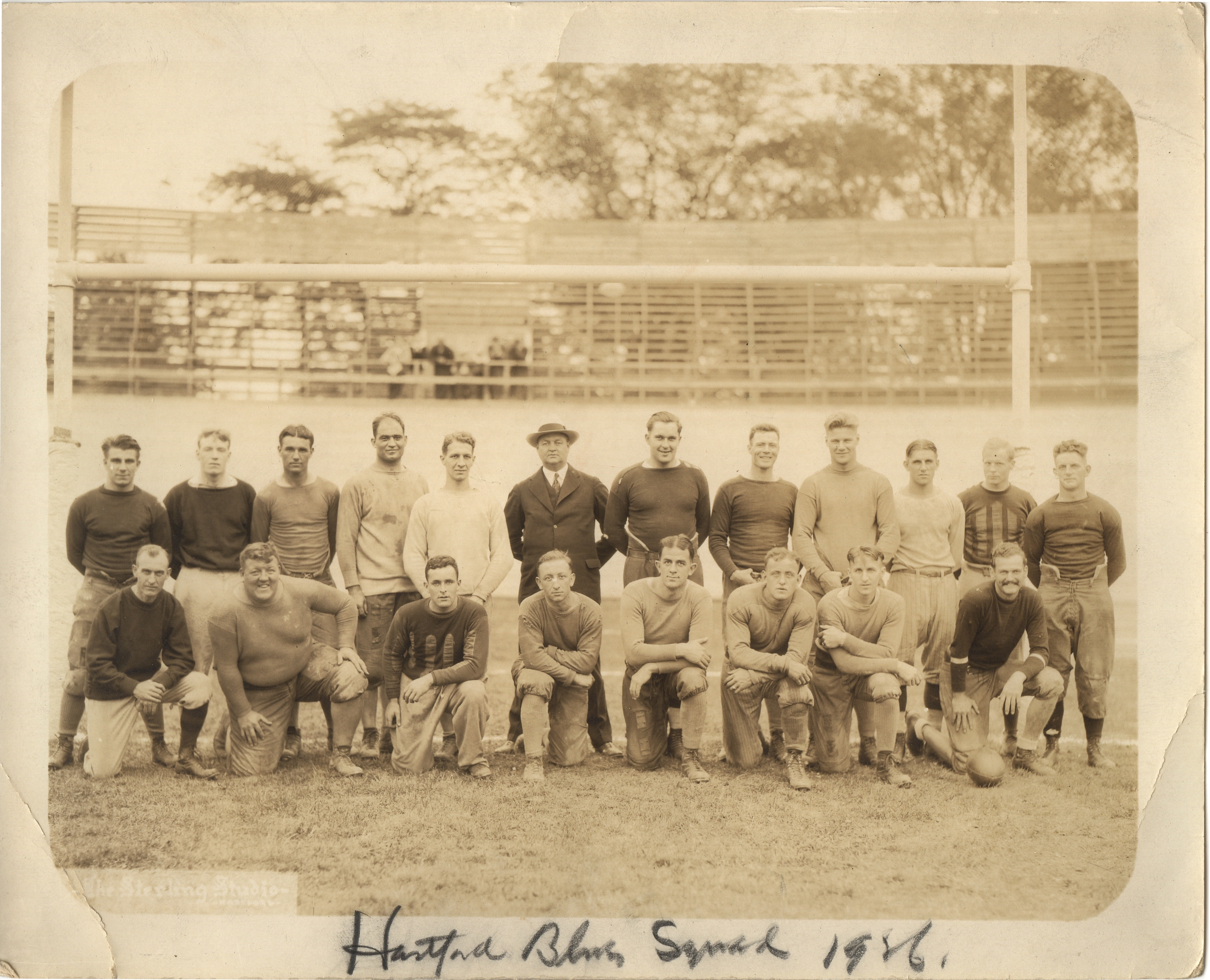
Hartford Blues, 1926

In 1926 Mulligan petitioned the NFL to become a franchise, with the League accepting. Mulligan then moved the team to the 8,000 seat bicycle track, the East Hartford Velodrome. He also signed Jack Keogh as head coach, then an assistant at the University of Pennsylvania. The team assembled by Mulligan was centered around three NFL veterans, Howard Webber, Hec Garvey, and Elmer McCormick, although Garvey would only dress for games, as he was also filming a movie, The Quarterback, at the same time. Around them he signed a slate of fresh college graduates, Enid Thomas, Jim Foley, Eddie McEvoy, and Ernie McCann who also doubled as assistant coach, alongside Connecticut natives Furlong Flynn, Ed Keenan, and Dick Noble.

Only 18 players participated at training camp at the Connecticut State Armory with the Courant noting players practiced in golf pants due to scarcity of uniforms. Their only pre-season game would be against the Brooklyn Naval Hospital, beating them 33–7.

Their formal NFL debut was against the New York Giants before a crowd of 6,500, which saw the Blues blown out 21–0. The Blues would lose the next three games, one away and one home against the Yellowjackets and another home loss to the Columbus Panhandles. Mulligan revamped the team with three new defensive backs, Lou Smythe, Chuck Corgan and Jim Manning, going into a game against the Brooklyn Lions which they would win 16–6. At the same time the New York Yankees played a game at Clarkin against All-New Britain.

However, by then attendance had slipped to just 1,000. They would lose another home game against the traveling 'Kansas City' Cowboys that saw just 500 fans turn up, before earning a second 16–7 win against the Canton Bulldogs, with an attendance of 4,500 bolstered due to the presence of Jim Thorpe who ultimately did not play due to a shoulder injury. This was followed by a 13–7 loss to the Buffalo Rangers with poor attendance, which saw Mulligan reduce payroll and cutting some veterans but the team still won 21–0 against the Dayton Triangles the following week.

After another loss to the Duluth Eskimos marked by an extremely muddy playing surface due to heavy rain, the Blues would play an exhibition game the following day against All-New Britain which saw the stadium's second largest crowd at 6,000. The only game remaining on their schedule was an informal 'New England Championship' match-up against the Providence Steam Rollers, however, the morning of the game saw a deep snow blanketing the Northeast, with the team unable to reach the field in time, unaware the game had been cancelled.

=== Return to semi-pro (1927) ===
Despite Mulligan willing to keep the team afloat, in 1927 in an attempt to 'streamline' the league the NFL looked to reduce the number of teams, and voted to drop the Blues from its ranks, however, Mulligan renamed the team and kept it in operation for another year as the independent Hartford Giants, posting a 7–1 record before disbanding.

== Legacy ==
The Blues would be the last time a pro-team represented Connecticut in football, with the closest the state came to seeing a return of the NFL being in 1974 when the Giants played a season at the Yale Bowl due to the construction of Giants Stadium. A semi-pro league would continue to operate in the state into the 1970s.

== Hall of Famers ==
Hartford Blues Hall of Famers
Players
No.	Name	Position	Tenure	Inducted
—	Steve Owen	T/G	1925	1966

== Season-by-season ==
Year	W	L	T	Finish	Coach
1924	7	2	4	N/A	Dick McGrath
1925	10	2	0	N/A	Dick McGrath
1926	3	7	0	13th	Jack Keogh
1927	7	1	0	Inc.	Vincent Lacava
