= East Hartford Velodrome =

Velodrome in East Hartford, Connecticut

- Interactive map of East Hartford Velodrome
- Former names: Hurley Stadium
- Location: East Hartford, CT 06118
- Coordinates: 41.767335°N 72.660853°W
- Capacity: 8,000
- Surface: Grass

Construction
- Opened: June 28, 1926
- Closed: 1929
- Demolished: 1929
- Cost: $75,000

Tenants
- Hartford Blues/Giants (NFL/Indep.) (1926–27); East Hartford High School

The East Hartford Velodrome was a velodrome in East Hartford, Connecticut. In its three-year lifespan, it hosted football and boxing events before it was demolished in 1929.

The Hartford Blues played their 1926 and 1927 seasons at the velodrome, a then-new bicycle track located across the Connecticut River in East Hartford. The grass football field barely fit inside the wooden track. Its capacity was 8,000 spectators.

== Football ==
The Velodrome was the home for the National Football League's Hartford Blues for their 1926 and 1927 seasons.

== Boxing ==
The Velodrome has hosted many boxing events. One event was main evented by Connecticut's own Christopher "Battling" Battalino, when he defeated Archie Rosenberg by knock-out.

Date	Winner	Loser	Type	Rd., Time	Attendance	Ref.
June 6, 1928	Battling Battalino	Archie Rosenberg	KO	-	-	
September 23, 1929	Battling Battalino	André Routis	PTS	15	-	
August 18, 1930	Battling Battalino	Bud Taylor	PTS	10	-	
September 24, 1930	Kid Kaplan	Battling Battalino	PTS	10	-	
September 15, 1931	Battling Battalino	Eddie Shea	PTS	-	-	
