= George Mulligan =

Sports promoter and executive (1880–1955)

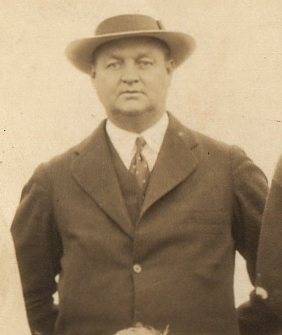
- Born: May 10, 1880; Durham, England
- Died: July 27, 1955 (aged 74)
- Occupations: Founder/owner of Hartford Blues; Sports promoter

George F. Mulligan (1880–1955) was the leading sports promoter in Connecticut during the early 1900s. He was also the founder and owner of the Hartford Blues of the National Football League. The Blues, which were referred to as the Waterbury Blues, began as a semi-pro football team in 1924, before joining the early NFL in 1926.

== Boxing ==
Mulligan operated professional boxing clubs in Hartford and Waterbury, Connecticut. He promoted three world championship boxing matches. The first was the Joe Lynch–Pete Herman bantamweight championship bout in 1919 in Waterbury. The second was the 1925 featherweight championship match between Kid Kaplan and Babe Herman in Waterbury. The final bout occurred in 1926 in Hartford between Kaplan and Bobby Garcia for the featherweight title.

== Football ==
In 1925, Mulligan signed Harry Stuhldreher of Notre Dame's Four Horsemen as the first national star to ever play pro football in Connecticut. Mulligans offer to Stuhldreher play for the Blues was for $7,500, plus a $500 bonus. In 1925, he moved the Blues to Hartford and into Clarkin Field. In 1926 the NFL accepted Mulligan's Blues as one of its 22 franchises. The Blues finished the season with a 3-7-0 NFL record and 13th place.

However, after the Blues' 1926 season, the NFL's owners voted to streamline the league and cut back from 22 to 12 teams. Red Grange's New York Yankees, from the first American Football League were also to be included as one of the 12 teams. As a result, half of the 1926 NFL teams were scrapped, including the Hartford Blues. In 1927, he ran the Hartford Giants, a semi-pro team with many of the players from the Blues, however that team folded after the season.

== Death ==
Mulligan died on July 27, 1955, at the age of 74.
