= Morgan G. Bulkeley Stadium =

Stadium in Hartford, Connecticut

- Clarkin Field in 1921

- Location within Connecticut Location within the United States
- Interactive map of Morgan G. Bulkeley Stadium
- Former names: Clarkin Field (1921–1927)
- Address: Hanmer & George Streets; Hartford, Connecticut
- Coordinates: 41°43′55.7″N 72°40′38.2″W
- Capacity: 12,500
- Field size: Left field: 315 ft (96 m); Center field: 340 ft (100 m); Right field: 310 ft (94 m)

Construction
- Groundbreaking: 1921
- Opened: 1921
- Demolished: 1960

Tenants
- Hartford Senators (EL; NeL) 1921–1932; 1934; Hartford Blues (Independent; NFL) 1925; 1926; Hartford Laurels (EL) 1938; 1944; Hartford Bees (EL) 1939–1943; 1945; Hartford Chiefs (EL) 1946–1952; Savitt Gems (semi-pro) 1933–?

Morgan G. Bulkeley Stadium was a sporting event stadium located in Hartford, Connecticut and the site of Babe Ruth's final exhibition baseball game. The facility was home to the Eastern League's Hartford Senators, the Hartford Blues of the National Football League, and included a 1/5 mile dirt oval for motor sports. Originally named Clarkin Field (or Clarkin Stadium) from 1921 to 1927, the stadium was renamed for former Connecticut Governor and First President of the National League, Morgan Bulkeley in 1928.

James H. Clarkin, owner of the Hartford Senators, replaced the old Wethersfield Avenue Baseball Grounds (also sometimes called Clarkin Field or Clarkin's Field) with the new Clarkin Field in 1921. After a series of rain delays, the ballpark finally opened on May 4, 1921.

The ballpark was located at Hanmer Street and George Street off of Franklin Avenue. Clarkin had erected the park with a stand of steel and concrete and dressing rooms, shower baths and complete modern equipment. On May 8, 1927, fire gutted the stand. The park was largely rebuilt in about nine weeks. After only playing away games during that time, the Hartford Senators returned to Hartford for the re-opening of Clarkin Field on July 11. Clarkin sold the ballpark and the team the following year. The park was renamed Bulkeley Stadium in February 1928. Clarkin died on March 12, 1933.

Between 1921 and 1952, the stadium was the home of Hartford's various minor league baseball teams: the Hartford Senators, Hartford Laurels, Hartford Bees, and Hartford Chiefs as well as their short lived NFL franchise the Hartford Blues. Lou Gehrig, Jim Thorpe, Ty Cobb, Jimmie Foxx, Leo Durocher, Hank Greenberg, Warren Spahn, Ted Williams, and Johnny Sain all played at Bulkeley Stadium at one point in their careers. When the Boston Braves moved to Milwaukee at the end of the 1952 season, Hartford's minor league team was relocated.

On September 30, 1945, George Herman "Babe" Ruth Jr. played in a charity game at Bulkeley Stadium for the Savitt Gems. The Gems were a semi-pro club sponsored by Bill Savitt who created the team in 1930 as part of the Greater Hartford Twilight Baseball League. At an old age of 50, Ruth entered the game as a pinch-hitter and grounded out to the opposing pitcher. The ballgame was Babe Ruth's final appearance of his playing career. Bulkeley Stadium fell into disarray and was demolished in 1960. The location of the stadium is currently a nursing home. A historical stone marker was dedicated there in 1998.

Contemporary aerial photos and plans (shown on the GHTBL page) help to pin down the location more specifically. The diamond was in the northeast corner of the field. George Street bordered the right field fence. Hanmer Street and Goodrich Street ran to the third base side of the field from the east, and then continued westward from George Street. Chester Street was to the south, half a block beyond the left field fence. Cowles Street was to the north, nearly a block beyond the first base side. Franklin Avenue paralleled George Street, a block or more to the east of the ballpark and intersected by Hanmer and Goodrich. A convenient reference point is the Naylor School, which was and still is to southeast of the ballpark location, on the west side of Franklin between Chester and Cromwell. The 1940 city directory gives the address as 60 Hanmer.

== Other Events ==
=== Boxing ===
Date	Winner	Opponent	Type	Round, time	Notes
July 25, 1940	Willie Pep	Joey Marcus	UD	4	
August 8, 1940	Willie Pep	Joey Wasnick	KO	3 (4)	
August 20, 1940	Bobby Ivy	Joey Archibald	PTS	10	
August 29, 1940	Willie Pep	Tommy Burns	TKO	1 (4)	
September 19, 1940	Willie Pep	Jackie Moore	UD	6	
June 24, 1941	Willie Pep	Eddie DeAngelis	TKO	3 (8)	
July 14, 1941	Willie Pep	Jimmy Gilligan	UD	8	
August 5, 1941	Willie Pep	Paul Frechette	TKO	3 (6)	
June 23, 1942	Willie Pep	Joey Archibald	PTS	10	
July 21, 1942	Willie Pep	Abe Denver	PTS	12	For the USA New England Featherweight Championship
August 11, 1942	Willie Pep	Pedro Hernandez	PTS	10	
September 22, 1942	Willie Pep	Vince Dell'Orto	PTS	10	
