= Brooklyn Lions / Horsemen (1926) =

National Football League team season

Brooklyn Lions

General information
- Founded: 1926
- Folded: 1926
- Stadium: Ebbets Field
- Headquartered: Brooklyn, New York, United States
- Colors: Red, black, white

Personnel
- Owner: Edward Berry
- Head coach: Punk Berryman

Team history
- Brooklyn Lions (1926); Brooklyn Horsemen-Lions (1926) (Merger)

League / conference affiliations
- National Football League

The Brooklyn Lions were a National Football League team that played in the 1926 NFL season. The team was formed as the league's counter-move to the first American Football League, which enfranchised a team called the Brooklyn Horsemen, a professional football team that competed in the 1926 AFL season.

In the months before the regular season began, both leagues battled with each other for fan support and the right to play at Ebbets Field. The NFL emerged as the winner, as the Lions signed the lease to use the stadium on July 20.

On November 12, 1926, the Horsemen withdrew from the AFL and merged with the Lions. The new team created by the merger was initially called the Brooklyn Lions and competed in the NFL from November 22, 1926. For the last three games of the 1926, the team used the Horsemen name to finish the season. After three consecutive losses by shutout, the merged team winked out of existence.

== Brooklyn Lions (NFL) ==
On July 10, 1926, NFL owners gathered for their annual July scheduling meeting granted a franchise to Edward Butler for a new Brooklyn team — the Brooklyn Lions. Coached by Punk Berryman, the Lions featured Rex Thomas and Herm Bagby, two members of the backfield who could play either tailback or wingback.

On defense, Thomas also snared four interceptions. Notably, the team signed 32-year old former Pitt offensive lineman Jim Bond, who hadn't played in organized sports in six years and was even offered his own one-man Broadway show on his way to sign his contract with the Lions.

Unfortunately, the team was only slightly more consistent in its play than the Horsemen, and after the November 7 game against the Kansas City Cowboys (a 10–9 loss at Ebbets Field), the Lions merged with the Horsemen. At the time of the merger, the Lions had compiled a 2–5 win–loss record.

Year	W	L	T	Finish	Coach
1926	3	8	0	14th	Punk Berryman

NOTE: Final NFL standings: official franchise won–lost record combines the wins and losses of the Lions with the results of the games played by the merged team, originally named the Brooklyn Lions and later the Brooklyn Horsemen.

== Brooklyn Horsemen (AFL) ==
Brooklyn Horsemen

General information
- Founded: 1926
- Folded: 1926
- Stadium: Commercial Field
- Headquartered: Brooklyn, New York, United States
- Colors: Maroon, Black, White

Personnel
- Owner: Humbert Fugazy
- Head coach: Eddie McNeely (Horsemen)

Team history
- Brooklyn Horsemen (1926); Brooklyn Horsemen-Lions (1926) (Merger)

League / conference affiliations
- American Football League (1926)

The Horsemen of the first AFL were owned by boxing promoter Humbert Fugazy and played their home games in Brooklyn's Commercial Field. Coached by Eddie McNeely, the Horsemen got the team name after McNeely's signing of Elmer Layden and Harry Stuhldreher, two of Notre Dame's Four Horsemen. While the team's first game was decided by a 60-yard touchdown pass from Stuldreher to Ed Harrison, the team had trouble maintaining a steady offense (and, ultimately maintaining a fan base). After losses to the Los Angeles Wildcats and Boston Bulldogs in front of decreasing crowds, a scheduled game at Ebbets Field against league leader (and eventual champion) Philadelphia Quakers was cancelled due to inclement weather. On November 7, 1926, the Horsemen played their last AFL game, a 21–13 loss to the New York Yankees, and then merged with their NFL cousins, the Brooklyn Lions, to complete the season in the NFL.

Year	W	L	T	Finish	Coach
1926	1	3	0	8th	Eddie McNeely

== "Horse-Lions": The Brooklyn Horsemen (NFL) ==
The result of the merger was derisively dubbed the Horse-Lions by the local media, but initially (November 14, 1926) the merged team played under the Brooklyn Lions banner. The new team, with eight members of the now-defunct AFL team, trounced the Canton Bulldogs 19–0 in front of a small crowd in Ebbets Field. In a last-ditch effort to attract paying fans, the Lions then adopted the Horsemen nickname of the old AFL team and lost the last three games of their existence by shutout.

=== Horsemen who were also Lions ===
Eight men played for both the Horsemen in the AFL and the Lions/Horsemen in the NFL:

- Fullback Earl Britton
- End Ted Drews
- End Ed Harrison
- Guard Red Howard
- Center Ted Plumridge
- Tailback Harry Stuhldreher
- Guard Tarzan Taylor

In addition, guard Hec Garvey was on the rosters of no fewer than four teams in the AFL or NFL in 1926: the Hartford Blues (NFL), the Horsemen (AFL), the Lions (NFL), and the New York Yankees.
