= Kansas City Cowboys (NFL) =

Former professional American football team

Kansas City Blues-Cowboys

General information
- Founded: 1924
- Folded: 1926
- Stadium: Traveling Team
- Headquartered: Kansas City, Missouri, United States
- Colors: Black, white

Personnel
- Head coach: LeRoy Andrews

Team history
- Kansas City Blues (1924); Kansas City Cowboys (1925–1926)

League / conference affiliations
- National Football League

The Kansas City Cowboys were a National Football League team based in Kansas City, Missouri. The team was founded as the Kansas City Blues in 1924, and as the Kansas City Cowboys in 1925 and 1926. The Blues competed as a traveling team, playing all of their NFL games in other cities' stadiums in their only year under that name. LeRoy Andrews acted as the team's player-coach.

== History ==
The team was owned by Maurice R. Smith, Joe Brecklein and Cameron K. Reid. The Cowboys were known for dressing in cowboy attire and fans came out in great numbers to see them play. Immediately after the game, the Giants hired away head coach LeRoy Andrews and most of the Cowboys players. Maurice R. Smith then arranged to give what remained of the team to Cleveland under the condition that it would be given back if he wanted the team returned.

President Joe Carr (of the NFL) agreed to the arrangement although there was never any assurance it would be honored.

The Kansas City Cowboys were purchased in 1927 by Sammy Deutsch, a Cleveland jewelry dealer and sports promoter who had formerly owned the Cleveland Bulldogs in 1924 before selling the money-losing team. Deutsch saw the team as a new business opportunity when he was able to procure the services of Cleveland-born Michigan passing legend Benny Friedman, whom he contracted of an astounding $18,000 for the 1927 season — the second highest compensation package in the league behind only Red Grange. With the sale, the era of NFL football in Kansas City came to a close until the incorporation of the Kansas City Chiefs in the AFL-NFL merger of 1970.

In 1928 the Bulldogs again pulled up stakes, capitalizing on Friedman's Michigan connection to become the Detroit Wolverines. LeRoy Andrews was hired to coach the team.

After a successful 1928 season, the Wolverines were purchased by Timothy Mara, owner of the New York Giants, to strip them of their assets, including first and foremost future Pro Football Hall of Famer Friedman, the league's first passing superstar. This brought the story of the Kansas City Cowboys, Cleveland Bulldogs and Detroit Wolverines to an end.

Coach Steve Owen played for both the Cowboys and the successor Cleveland Bulldogs. He and LeRoy Andrews fell out over their part of the purchase price for the Cowboys when they were sold to the Bulldogs and resulted in his contract being sold to the New York Giants. Owen was hired as head coach of the Giants in 1931 and remained their coach until 1953.

== Pro Football Hall of Famers ==
Kansas City Blues/Cowboys Hall of Famers
Players
No.	Name	Position	Tenure	Inducted
—	Joe Guyon	T/HB	1925	1966
—	Steve Owen	T/G	1924–25	1966

== Season-by-season ==
	Year	W	L	T	Finish	Coach
Blues	1924	2	7	0	15th	LeRoy Andrews
Cowboys	1925	2	5	1	13th	LeRoy Andrews
Cowboys	1926	8	3	0	4th	LeRoy Andrews

== See also ==
- Sports in Kansas City
- Kansas City Chiefs
- American Football League (1934) – sole championship was won by St. Louis/Kansas City Blues
