= Englewood Technical Prep Academy =

Englewood High School (Chicago)

Location
- 6201 South Stewart Avenue; Chicago, Illinois 60621; United States

Information
- Type: Public; Secondary
- Opened: 1874; 2007 (as TEAM Englewood)
- Closed: 2008; 2018 (as TEAM Englewood)
- Oversight: Chicago Public Schools
- Grades: 9–12
- Gender: Coed
- Enrollment: 151 (2007–08; last graduating seniors); 76 (2017–18)
- Colors: Purple; White
- Fight song: "Our Englewood"
- Athletics conference: Chicago Public League
- Mascot: Eagles
- Accreditation: North Central Association of Colleges and Schools
- Yearbook: Purple And White

Urban Prep Charter Academy succeeded Englewood High School, Englewood Technical Prep Academy and TEAM Englewood Academy High School in Chicago. Englewood was a public four-year high school located in the Englewood neighborhood on the South Side of Chicago, Illinois, United States. Opened in 1874, Englewood was owned and operated by the Chicago Public Schools (CPS) system. Englewood High School closed in 2008. The building is occupied by school in the Urban Prep Academy network. The school is a public charter high school for young men that opened in 2006.

== History ==
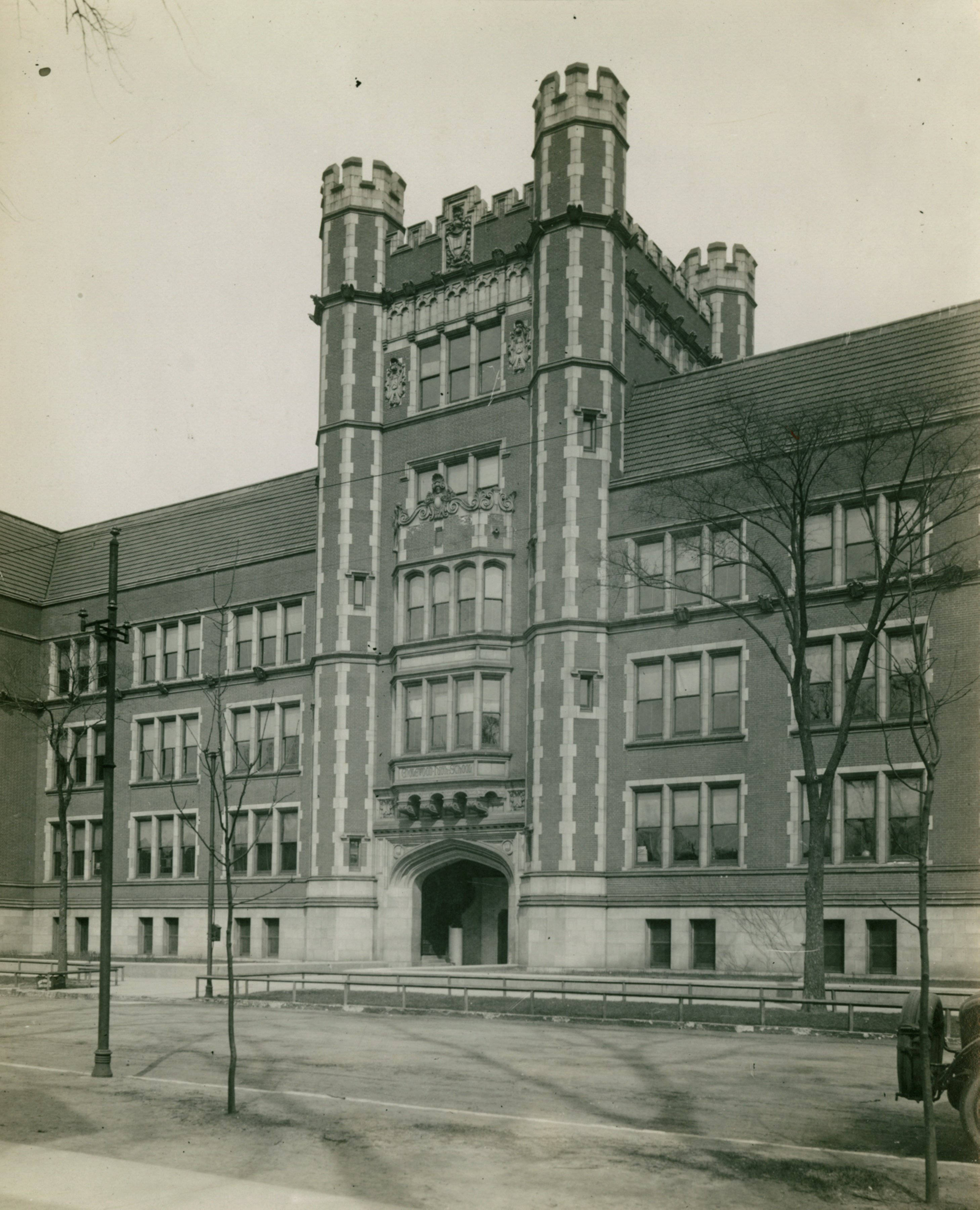
Englewood High School in the early 20th century

Englewood High School was established in 1873 by the Chicago Board of Education and opened for the 1874–1875 school year. Plans for a newer building for Englewood were proposed in March 1974 due to the aging of the then-100-year-old building. The new structure was built in 1978 on the same site to replaced the demolished original. Englewood's new campus opened for students in 1979.

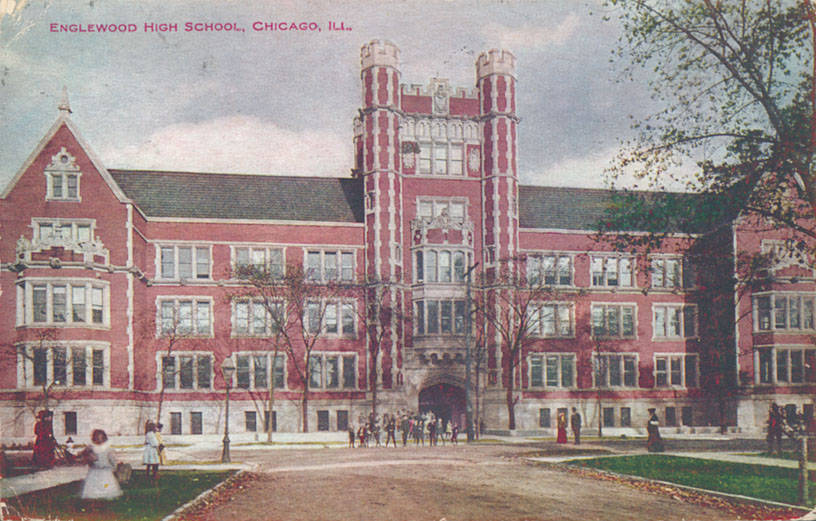

The school board decided in 2005 that, due to its poor performance, Englewood would be phased out over a three-year period to allow the freshmen who had entered to be the final class to graduate. Many reasons were behind the closing of this school. It was one of the worst performing public schools in the US for the end of 2008. Englewood was closed as an action in the CPS Renaissance 2010 program. After graduating its final class of 151 seniors in June 2008, Englewood High School closed.

=== TEAM Englewood ===
Under Renaissance 2010 program, Englewood was re-opened as TEAM Englewood Academy High School for the 2007–2008 school year. The new school was designed by the new staff. Still fully operated by the school district, TEAM Englewood was a smaller school that consisted of more community involvement with curriculum. Team Englewood still used the Englewood High School team name "The Eagles" and colors of purple and white. With the last of its students having graduated or transferred to other schools during the 2017–2018 school year, TEAM Englewood formally closed in November 2018.

=== Other information ===
In 2002, 18-year-old Englewood senior Maurice Davis was shot to death at a bus stop located in front of the school. He was the seventh student killed in or near a public school in Chicago. Before closing, this school was a participant in one of the oldest rivalries in the United States against Hyde Park Career Academy (now Hyde Park Academy High School).

== Charter school ==
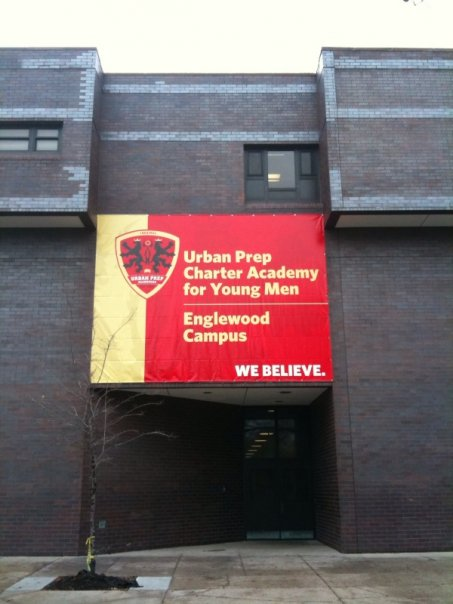
Urban Prep Englewood entrance

Urban Prep operated a boys charter school in the building. Its charter was revoked in 2023 over mismanagement and misconduct allegations despite a track record of college admissions success. In 2023, Chicago Public Schools is moving to take over operation of the school. On July 25 the all boys school located in Englewood and Bronzeville won their court appeal.

== Athletics ==
Englewood competed in the Chicago Public League (CPL) and was a member of the Illinois High School Association (IHSA). Their team name were the Eagles. The boys' track team were state champions four times (1895, 1897, 1901, 1905); and were Public League champions in 1976. The boys' cross country team were Public League champions (1933, 1934; 1936–37, 1950–51, 1953–54, 1955–56, 1957 and 1968). The boys' football team were Public League champions six times (1914–16, 1918–20). The boys' basketball team were Public League champions two times (1917–18, 1926–27) and Regional champions in 2007–08.

=== Art Folz and the 1925 Chicago Cardinals ===
Prior to the 1933 season, the National Football League team with the best record in the standings at the end of the season, was named the season's NFL Champions. In 1925, with the Chicago Cardinals trailing the Pottsville Maroons a half game lead in the standings, two extra games were scheduled by the Cardinals against the inferior Milwaukee Badgers and Hammond Pros, both of which were NFL members at the time, to close the standings gap. Art Folz, an Englewood High School graduate and a substitute quarterback for the Cardinals, convinced four players from Englewood High School to join the Milwaukee Badgers for the game under assumed names, thereby ensuring that the Cardinals' opponent was not a pro caliber club. The Cardinals later defeated Milwaukee 59–0. NFL President Joseph Carr later learned that high school players had been used and told reporters the 59-0 Cardinals win would be stricken from the record. However, the league had never got around to removing it. The game is still a part of the NFL records. The Cardinals' owner, Chris O'Brien, was also fined $1,000 by Carr for allowing his team play a game against high schoolers, even though he claimed that he was unaware of the players' status. Badgers' owner Ambrose McGuirk was ordered to sell his Milwaukee franchise within 90 days. Art Folz was then barred from football for life.

However prior to the 1926 season, Folz's lifetime ban was lifted, however he chose not to return to pro football. The $1,000 fine against O'Brien was rescinded. McGuirk though had already sold his Badgers franchise to Johnny Bryan, a fullback with the Chicago Bears. The Englewood players were also forgiven, and two of them, William Thompson and Charles Richardson, earned high school all-star recognition at the end of the season. Folz reportedly told the high schoolers that the game was a "practice game" and would in no part affect their amateur status.

== Notable alumni ==
=== Englewood ===
- Charlie Bachman (1892–1985) – player and coach in College Football Hall of Fame.
- The Barrett Sisters – legendary gospel trio.
- Timuel Black (1918–2021) – Historian and civil rights activist.
- Harold Bradley Jr. (1929–2021) – the Engelwood varsity football team captain and the Most Valuable Player for the University of Iowa in 1950 was a former professional football player and an Italy-based stage and movie actor, singer, artist, and painter. He played college football at the University of Iowa and played four seasons in the NFL from 1954 to 1958 (Cleveland Browns, Philadelphia Eagles).
- Harold Bradley Sr. (1905–1973) – American football player for the Chicago Cardinals in 1928. Bradley was one of only 13 African-Americans to play in the National Football League prior to World War II and just the second African-American lineman in the history of the NFL, following Duke Slater. He played collegiately at the University of Iowa in 1926 and was the father of Harold Bradley Jr., who also played in the NFL.
- Gwendolyn Brooks (1917–2000) – winner of 1950 Pulitzer Prize for poetry, the first African American to do so; Poet Laureate of Illinois.
- Oscar Brown, Jr. (1926–2005) – singer, songwriter, playwright, poet, and civil-rights activist.
- Buck Brown (1936–2007) – Playboy magazine cartoonist.
- E. Simms Campbell (1906–1971) - cartoonist, illustrator, author, the first African American cartoonist published in nationally distributed magazines, who was featured in Esquire from 1933 through 1958, and creator of Cuties, which was syndicated in 145 newspapers.
- George Robert Carruthers (1939–2020) – physicist, space scientist
- Gene Chandler (born 1937) – singer, best known for his 1962 number-one song "Duke of Earl".
- Merri Dee (1936–2022) – WGN anchor, reporter, television personality, victims' rights advocate and philanthropist.
- Sam Greenlee (1930–2014) – African-American writer, best known for his 1969 novel The Spook Who Sat by the Door.
- Lorraine Hansberry (1930–1965) – author of 1959 play A Raisin in the Sun, first African-American female playwright to have work produced on Broadway.
- Richard Hunt (1935–2023) – famous Chicago sculptor and first African-American sculptor to have a retrospective at the Museum of Modern Art in 1971.
- Harold L. Ickes (1874–1952) – U.S. Secretary of the Interior under presidents Franklin Delano Roosevelt and Harry Truman.
- Morris S. Kaplan (1921-2003) – Manhattan Project Chemical Engineer. Founding Chief Filtration Engineer of world's largest water purification plant (James Jardine Water Purification Plant, Chicago), Chief Filtration Engineer South Water (Eugene Sawyer) Purification Plant
- Robert Henry Lawrence, Jr. (1935–1967) – Air Force pilot and first African-American astronaut.
- Margaret Mann (Librarian) (1873–1960) – Noted Librarian and Cataloger
- Robert W. ("Bob" or "Tiny") Maxwell (1883–1922) – football player, coach, and official; sports editor; namesake of the Maxwell Football Club and the Maxwell Trophy.
- Milton Mayer (1908–1986) – journalist, educator, and author of the influential book They Thought They Were Free: The Germans, 1933–45, which let ordinary German citizens tell their stories of how the Nazi Party rose to power.
- Walter McCornack (1875–1939) – football player at Dartmouth and football coach at Dartmouth and Northwestern.
- Archibald Motley, Jr. (1891–1981) – Jazz Age artist.
- Willard Motley (1909–1965) – author.
- Anna E. Nicholes (1865-1917) – social reformer, civil servant, clubwoman
- Nichelle Nichols (1932-2022) – actress, singer and dancer.
- Carl Nicks (born 1958) – former NBA player; star player at Indiana State University; selected as member of Centennial Team, Missouri Valley Conference.
- Geraldine Page (1924–1987) – Academy Award-winning actress for The Trip to Bountiful, Emmy winner and four-time Tony Award nominee inducted in American Theater Hall of Fame.
- Joanna Snowden Porter (1864 – 1941) American clubwoman and activist.
- Sylvester O. Rhem (1929–2007) – Illinois state representative and Chicago police officer
- Frank Richman (1881-1956) – Justice of the Indiana Supreme Court, judge at the Nuremberg trials.
- Meyer Rubin (1924–2020) – geologist
- Joe Williams (1918–1999) – Grammy Award-winning jazz singer who sang with Count Basie's orchestra.
