= 1925 Chicago Cardinals–Milwaukee Badgers scandal =

National Football league scandal

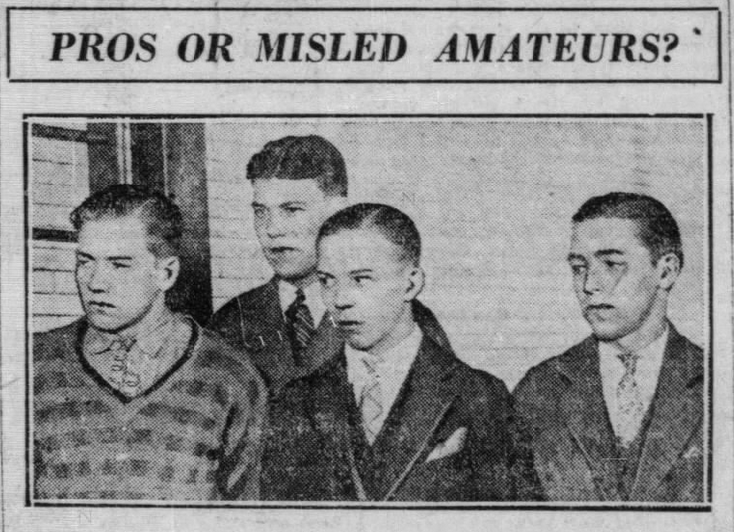
Players involved in the scandal: (left-to-right) Jimmy Snyder, Bill Thompson, Jack Daniels, Charles Richardson

The 1925 Chicago Cardinals–Milwaukee Badgers scandal was a scandal centered on a 1925 game between the Chicago Cardinals and the Milwaukee Badgers of the National Football League. The scandal involved a Chicago player, Art Folz, hiring a group of high school football players to play for the Milwaukee Badgers against the Cardinals. This would ensure an inferior opponent for Chicago. The game was used to help prop up their win–loss percentage and as a chance of wresting the 1925 Championship away from the first place Pottsville Maroons.

== The scandal ==
Milwaukee vs. Chicago (1925)
Milwaukee Badgers (0-6)	Chicago Cardinals (11-2-1)
0	58
Head coach: Johnny Bryan	Head coach: Norman Barry
	1	2	3	4	Total
MIL	0	0	0	0	0
CHIC	7	19	0	32	58
- Date: December 10, 1925
- Stadium: Normal Park; Chicago, Illinois

In 1925, the Chicago Cardinals were in the running to win the NFL championship with the Pottsville Maroons. The Maroons had beaten the Cardinals 21-7 earlier in the season at Comiskey Park. This loss gave Pottsville a half game lead in the standings. However, the Cardinals felt that they could make up for the loss. Many professional football teams during the first decade of the NFL would schedule some easy extra games to pad their record and place in the standing. The Cardinals had hoped that the move would help bump the team to a first-place finish over Pottsville. Prior to 1933, the team with the best record in the standings at the end of the season was named the season's NFL Champions.

The two extra games were scheduled against the inferior Milwaukee Badgers and Hammond Pros, both of which were NFL members but had disbanded for the year. The Badgers, owned by Ambrose McGuirk, agreed to a game against the Cardinals. However, McGuirk lived in Chicago, which put him at a disadvantage in getting his team back together to play the Cardinals. Art Folz, a substitute quarterback for the Cardinals, convinced four players from Englewood High School, located in Chicago, into joining the Badgers for the game under assumed names, thereby ensuring that the Cardinals' opponent was not a pro caliber club. Folz himself was an Englewood High School graduate. Meanwhile, the Cardinals' owner, Chris O'Brien, unaware of the roster tampering, but still sensing a mismatch, did not charge attendance to the few scattered spectators who turned up for the December 10, 1925, game. However, the second game on December 12, against Hammond proved to be much closer in score with 13-0 Cardinals win over the Pros.

=== Box score ===
Quarter	1	2	3	4	Total
Badgers	0	0	0	0	0
Cardinals	7	19	0	32	58

at Normal Field, Chicago, Illinois

- Date: Thursday, December 10, 1925

Game information
- CHI - TD: Art Folz 45 yard blocked punt return (Red Dunn kick) 7-0 CHI
- CHI - TD: Art Folz 17 yard rush (Red Dunn kick) 14-0 CHI
- CHI - TD: Herb Blumer 50 yard pass from Red Dunn 20-0 CHI
- CHI - TD: Art Folz 37 yard pass from Red Dunn 26-0 CHI
- CHI - TD: Earl Evans 30 yard fumble return (Red Dunn kick) 33-0 CHI
- CHI - TD: Cardinals Art Folz 55 yard rush 39-0 CHI
- CHI - TD: Jimmy Tays 20 yard fumble return 45-0 CHI
- CHI - TD: Herb Blumer unknown yard pass from Red Dunn (Red Dunn kick) 52-0 CHI
- CHI - TD: Ike Mahoney 35 yard pass from Red Dunn 58-0 CHI

== Outcome ==
=== Initial ===
A few weeks later, when NFL President Joseph Carr learned high school players had been used, he told reporters the 58-0 Cardinals win would be stricken from the record. However, the league had never got around to removing it. The game is still a part of the NFL records. Chris O'Brien was also fined $1,000 by Carr for allowing his team play a game against high schoolers, even though he claimed that he was unaware of the players' status. Ambrose McGuirk was ordered to sell his Milwaukee franchise within 90 days. Folz, for his role, was barred from football for life.

=== 1926 ===
By the summer of 1926, Carr toned down his punishment for each party involved in the scandal. Folz's lifetime ban was lifted, probably to prevent him from joining the first American Football League; however he chose not to return to pro football. The $1,000 fine against O'Brien was rescinded, probably since the amount would have put the Cardinals out of business. McGuirk though had already sold his Badgers franchise to Johnny Bryan, a fullback with the Chicago Bears. The Englewood players were also forgiven, and two of them, William Thompson and Charles Richardson, earned high school all-star recognition at the end of the season. Folz reportedly told the high schoolers that the game was a "practice game" and would in no part affect their amateur status.

=== Role in the 1925 NFL championship dispute ===
In early December 1925, the Maroons, with a 9–2 record, were just a half-game behind the Cardinals, who were 9–1–1. At the same time as the Hammond-Chicago game, the Maroons scheduled a game against a team of Notre Dame all-stars that included the famed Four Horsemen. Due to the public interest of the game, it was played in a larger venue, Philadelphia's Shibe Park, not Pottsville's Minersville Park, which was mainly a high school stadium. By playing in Philadelphia, the Maroons were violating territory agreements drawn up by the NFL. Philadelphia was within the boundaries already claimed as the home by the Frankford Yellow Jackets. The Yellow Jackets, after hearing of the planned Notre Dame contest, filed a protest with the NFL. Pottsville's owner said all along that the game was sanctioned by the NFL and that he had received permission to play in Philadelphia from an NFL secretary. However, Carr had the final say and on several occasions, he threatened the Pottsville team with suspension from the league if the game took place. Pottsville played the game anyway and won, 9–7, on a last-minute field goal. The Maroons were fined, tossed from the league, and stripped of their title. They would also have to cancel the remaining game on their schedule, against the Providence Steam Roller. The team also was ruled ineligible for the league title, which was eventually awarded to the Cardinals.

However, the Pottsville fans still demand to know why Cardinals was awarded the title even though they too were found by Carr to have violated the NFL's rules. According to Bob Carroll of the Professional Football Researchers Association, "The Cardinals didn't defy the league," Carroll said. "Pottsville did. It was a great team, but the owner made a mistake." However, it is still not entirely known if O'Brien knew of the high school players on the Badgers team.

The Pottsville team was reinstated by the NFL in July 1926, mainly because the NFL did not want to lose Pottsville's skilled group of players to the upstart American Football League. Even though the Cardinals were awarded the 1925 Championship, O'Brien refused to accept it, stating that he did not want to win the title "that way". However, in 1933, as Charles Bidwill took over as the owner of the Cardinals, he began to claim the 1925 title belonged to the Cardinals, overturning O'Brien's earlier decision. It is also believed that a Cardinals Football Curse was put upon the Cardinals and Bidwell because of the events surrounding the 1925 Championship. The Cardinals did however, win the NFL Championship in 1947.
