= Charlie Brown (basketball, born 1936) =

American basketball player (1936–2022)

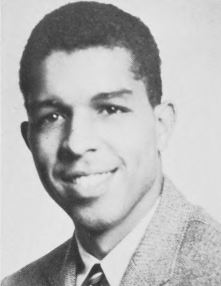
- Brown in his senior season at Seattle, 1959

Personal information
- Born: February 24, 1936 Canton, Mississippi, U.S.
- Died: August 26, 2022 (aged 86) Chicago, Illinois, U.S.
- Listed height: 6 ft 2 in (1.88 m)
- Listed weight: 185 lb (84 kg)

Career information
- High school: DuSable (Chicago, Illinois)
- College: Indiana (1955–1956); Seattle (1957–1959)
- NBA draft: 1959: 11th round, 72nd overall pick
- Drafted by: Cincinnati Royals
- Position: Small forward / shooting guard

Career highlights
- Third-team All-American – UPI (1959)
- Stats at Basketball Reference

Charles Brown (February 24, 1936 – August 26, 2022), nicknamed Sweet Charlie, was an American basketball player, known for his All-American college career at Seattle University, as well as his role as a part of two championship teams at DuSable High School in Chicago, Illinois.

== High school career ==
Along with Shellie McMillon and Paxton Lumpkin, Brown was a part of a nucleus of players that formed a formidable DuSable team that won Chicago Public League championships in the 1952–53 and 1953–54 seasons. In 1954, the team advanced to the Illinois state finals as the first all-black team to compete "downstate." Locally dubbed the "Wonder Five," the team lost the championship game 72–70 to Mt. Vernon. Brown was named to the all-tournament team and in 2006 was named one of the 100 Legends of the IHSA Boys Basketball Tournament in celebration of the Illinois High School Association's 100th season.

== College career ==
Brown started his college career at Indiana, enrolling along with high school teammate Lumpkin in Fall 1954 as a part of a recruiting class that also included future National Basketball Association (NBA) player Archie Dees. Freshmen were not eligible to play varsity sports per NCAA rules of the time, but the heralded freshmen narrowly lost to the defending national champion varsity team in a preseason game – partly due to intervention by the coaching staff, including benching the sweet-shooting Brown once the freshmen had built a sizable lead.

Brown prepared to join the varsity for the 1955–56 season, but there was controversy as Brown and Lumpkin played with their former DuSable teammates in an amateur AAU tournament in April. This violated a Big Ten Conference rule that athletes could not compete as a representative of anyone other than their schools without forfeiting a year of eligibility. However, Hoosiers coach Branch McCracken successfully appealed the decision as the players had sought guidance prior to appearing in the event. Brown joined the Hoosiers for the season and quickly established himself as a scoring threat, averaging 14.8 points in the team's first 12 games and leading the team in scoring in Big Ten contests. His Hoosier career came to an end on January 31, 1956, when it was announced that Brown would be academically ineligible for the second semester. Brown left Indiana after this decision.

Brown chose Seattle to compete his college career, sitting out he 1956–57 season as a transfer and joining the team and its star Elgin Baylor for the 1957–58 campaign. Brown, with his strong outside shooting, rebounding and defense, proved to be a good complement to the All-American Baylor. He averaged 10.6 points on the year, good for second on the team. During the 1958 NCAA tournament, Brown hit two clutch shots in the Chieftains' West Regional Final against California in San Francisco. He first hit a mid-range jump shot with ten seconds remaining to send the game into overtime. He then hit a 25-foot shot with ten seconds left in overtime to seal the 66–62 win and a spot in the school's first Final Four. In the Final Four, the Chieftains upset favored Kansas State, but lost the championship game to Kentucky. With the departure of Baylor to the NBA, the Chieftains did not make the NCAA Tournament the next season, though they did achieve a season record of 23–6. Brown did enjoy a larger role with the team, settling into his role as the top scoring option. At the close of the season, Brown was named a third-team All-American by United Press International (UPI) after averaging 18 points and 11 rebounds per game.

== Post-college career and death ==
After the close of his college career, Brown was drafted by the Cincinnati Royals in the 11th round (72nd pick overall) of the 1959 NBA draft. However, he did not play in the NBA, instead joining the Army and then playing Amateur Athletic Union (AAU) basketball in Seattle and Chicago. He then settled into a career as a social worker in Chicago, but remained active in basketball as a high school referee and an organizer of local tournaments and leagues. After sustaining injuries from a fall, Brown died on August 26, 2022, at the age of 86.
