= Hal Erickson (American football) =

American football player (1898–1963)

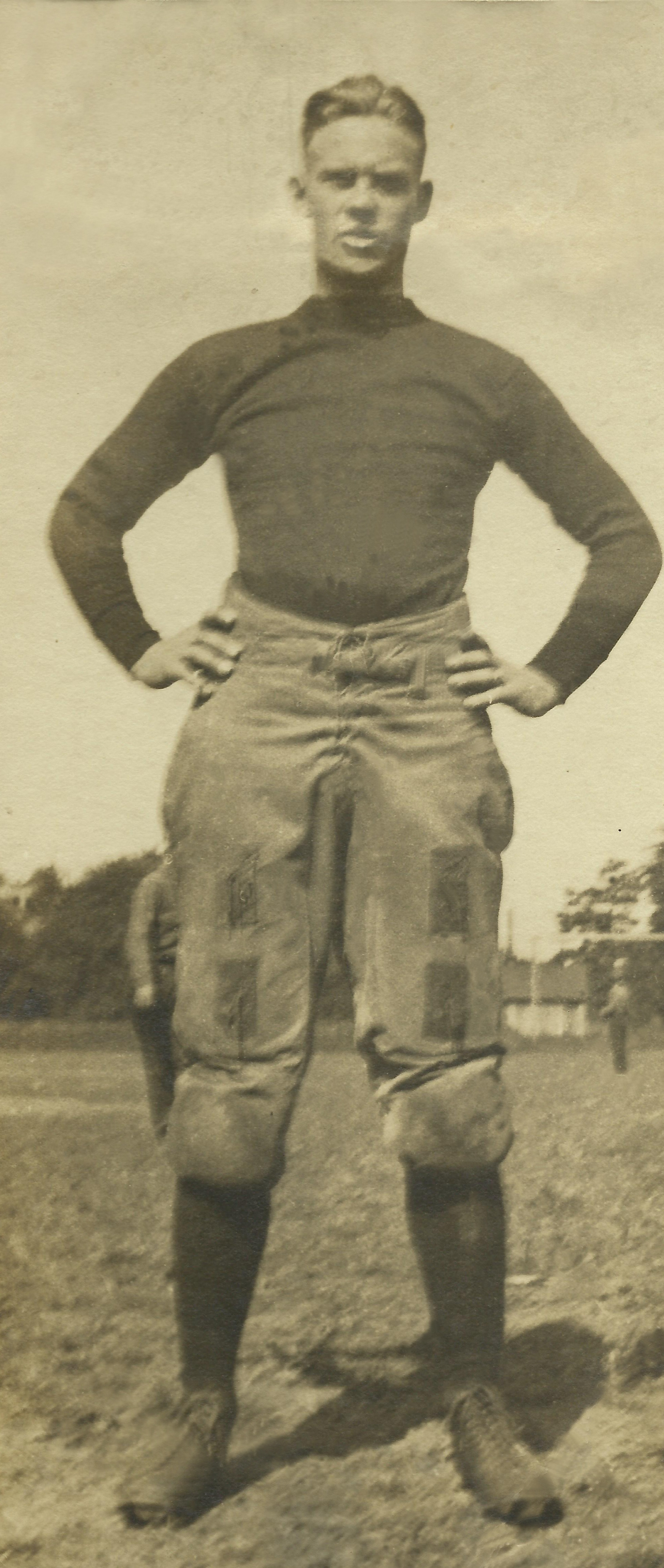

No. 3, 41
- Position: Running back

Personal information
- Born: March 10, 1898; Maynard, Minnesota, U.S.
- Died: January 27, 1963 (aged 64); Hennepin County, Minnesota, U.S.
- Listed height: 5 ft 9 in (1.75 m)
- Listed weight: 193 lb (88 kg)

Career information
- College: St. Olaf; Washington & Jefferson

Career history

Playing
- 1923–1924: Milwaukee Badgers
- 1925–1928: Chicago Cardinals
- 1929–1930: Minneapolis Red Jackets

Coaching
- 1924: Milwaukee Badgers

Awards and highlights
- NFL champion (1925)
- Coaching profile at Pro Football Reference
- Stats at Pro Football Reference

Other information
- Military career
- Allegiance: United States
- Branch: U.S. Navy
- Service years: 1917–1919
- Conflicts: World War I

Harold Alexander Erickson (March 10, 1898 – January 27, 1963), born Harald Alexander Ingvald Eriksen, was an American football back who played for three teams over eight seasons in the National Football League (NFL), four with the Chicago Cardinals, including the 1925 NFL Champion team.

== Biography ==
Erickson was born in Maynard, Minnesota on March 10, 1898 to Norwegian immigrant Reverend Michael Benjamin Eriksen (1867–1950) and his wife, first generation Norwegian-American Emma Gustava Eriksen (née Anderson) (1879–1940). Though he would be known as "Swede" during his football playing days, he was a Norwegian-American. A stocky man, he stood 5 feet (1.5 m) and 9 inches (230 mm) and weighed 193 pounds (88 kg).

Erickson served as a Chief Pharmacist's Mate in the United States Navy during World War I. He participated in the 1919 Rose Bowl as a member of the winning team, Great Lakes Navy from Great Lakes, Illinois, a team that also included future Pro Football Hall of Famers George Halas and Paddy Driscoll, who were also members of the NFL 1920s All-Decade Team. Erickson also participated in the 1922 Rose Bowl as a back for Washington and Jefferson, giving him the unique distinction of being the only man ever to play in two different Rose Bowls, with two different teams, without losing.

Erickson attended St. Olaf College in 1916 and 1917, and after completing his service in the United States Navy in 1919, he attended Washington & Jefferson College where he played competitive football. After college, though undrafted, Erickson went professional, playing eight seasons in the National Football League (1923–1930), with the Milwaukee Badgers, the Chicago Cardinals, and the Minneapolis Red Jackets. In 1924 he played for, and was the head coach of the Milwaukee Badgers, a team that included Pro Football Hall of Famer, and a member of the NFL 1920s All-Decade Team, Jimmy Conzelman. During the 1925 season Erickson scored six touchdowns (four receiving and two rushing) for the NFL Champion Chicago Cardinals who were 11–2–1 that year. At the conclusion of the 1925 NFL season, Erickson joined future Pro Football Hall of Famer Red Grange and the Chicago Bears on their post-season barnstorming tour. He was a member of the 1928 Chicago Cardinals team that included American sports legend and Pro Football Hall of Famer Jim Thorpe, also a member of the NFL 1920s All-Decade Team.

Erickson served as president of the Security National Life Insurance Company of Minneapolis. He was married to Vera Mattocks (1906–1998) until his death on January 27, 1963. He is buried at Fort Snelling National Cemetery in Minneapolis.
