= Johnny Bryan =

American football player, coach, and owner (1897–1966)

Profile
- Positions: Fullback, Halfback, Quarterback

Personal information
- Born: February 28, 1897; Chicago, Illinois, U.S.
- Died: July 1, 1966 (aged 69); Fort Collins, Colorado, U.S.
- Listed height: 5 ft 7 in (1.70 m)
- Listed weight: 157 lb (71 kg)

Career information
- College: University of Chicago

Career history

Playing
- 1922: Chicago Cardinals
- 1923–1925: Chicago Bears
- 1925–1926: Milwaukee Badgers
- 1926–1927: Chicago Bears

Coaching
- 1925–1926: Milwaukee Badgers

owner
- 1925–1926: Milwaukee Badgers
- Coaching profile at Pro Football Reference

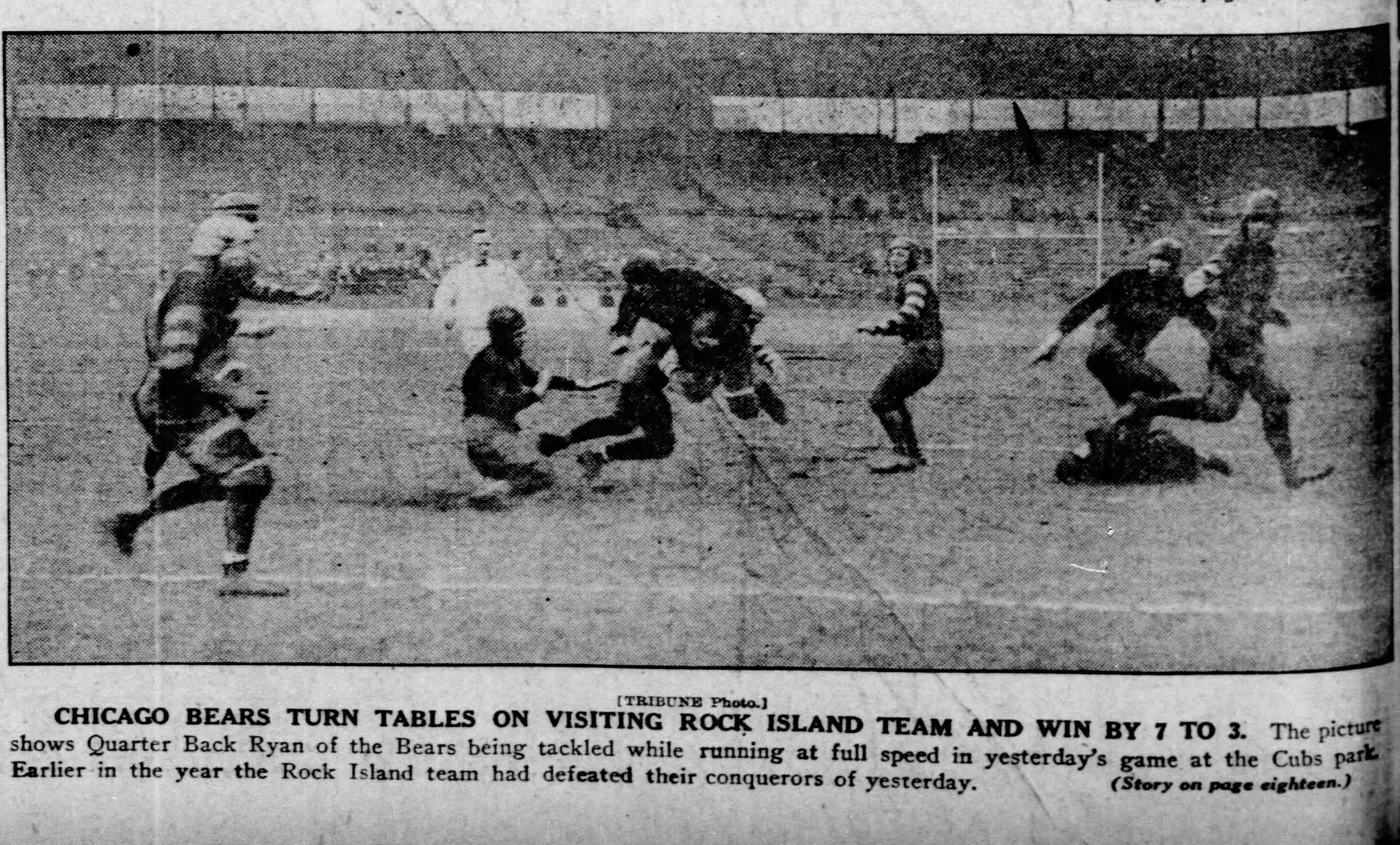

John Frederick Bryan (February 28, 1897 – July 1, 1966) was a professional football player for the Chicago Cardinals, Chicago Bears, and Milwaukee Badgers. He was also a player-coach and franchise owner of the Badgers in 1925 and 1926.

The Badgers franchise was turned over to Bryan after it was discovered that the team had employed four Chicago high school players for game against the Chicago Cardinals that resulted in a 59–0 loss for the Badgers. As a result of the scandal, owner Ambrose McGuirk was forced by NFL President Joe Carr to turn over his franchise to Bryan.

Under Bryan, the team did win two games in 1926 due to the arrival of end Lavern Dilweg. However Milwaukee dropped out of the NFL after that season.
