= Milton Mayer =

American journalist and educator

- Born: Milton Sanford Mayer; August 24, 1908; Chicago, Illinois, U.S.
- Died: April 20, 1986 (aged 77); Carmel, California, U.S.
- Education: University of Chicago (attended)
- Spouse(s): Bertha Tepper; Jane Scully
- Children: 4, including Rock

Milton Sanford Mayer (August 24, 1908 – April 20, 1986) was an American journalist and educator, best known for his long-running column in The Progressive magazine, founded by Robert M. La Follette Sr., in Madison, Wisconsin.

== Early life ==
Mayer, reared in Reform Judaism, was born in Chicago, the son of Morris Samuel Mayer and Louise (Gerson). He graduated from Englewood High School, where he received a classical education with an emphasis on Latin and languages. He studied at the University of Chicago (1925–1928) but did not earn a degree; in 1942, he told the Saturday Evening Post that he was "placed on permanent probation in 1928 for throwing beer bottles out a dormitory window." He was a reporter for the Associated Press (1928–1929), the Chicago Evening Post, and the Chicago American.

During his stint at the Post he married his first wife, Bertha Tepper (the couple had two daughters). In 1945, they were divorced, and two years later, Mayer married Jane Scully, whom he referred to as "Baby" in his magazine columns. Mayer and Scully raised Scully's two sons, Dicken and Rock. Rock Scully was one of the principal managers of the Grateful Dead from 1965 to 1985, while Dicken also worked for the group as a merchandise manager.

== Books ==
Mayer's most influential book was probably They Thought They Were Free: The Germans, 1933-45, a study of the lives of a group of ordinary Germans under the Third Reich, first published in 1955 by the University of Chicago Press. (Mayer became a member of the Religious Society of Friends or Quakers while he was researching this book in Germany in 1950; he accepted his Jewish birth and heritage.) At various times, he taught at the University of Chicago, the University of Massachusetts, and the University of Louisville as well as universities abroad. He was also a consultant to the Center for the Study of Democratic Institutions.

Mayer is also the author of What Can a Man Do? (Univ. of Chicago Press) and is the co-author, with Mortimer Adler, of The Revolution in Education (1944, Univ. of Chicago Press). He also wrote On Liberty: Man v. The State, which the Center for the Study of Democratic Institutions published in 1969 as a "Center Occasional Paper."

Mayer died in 1986 in Carmel, California, where he and his second wife made their home. Milton had one brother, Howie Mayer, who was the Chicago journalist who broke the Leopold and Loeb case.

== Controversies ==
He first gained widespread attention in an October 7, 1939, article in the Saturday Evening Post, entitled "I Think I'll Sit This One Out." He detailed that the approaching war would yield more harm than good because it did not address what he saw as the fundamental problem: "the animality in man." When he followed up this piece with another, two and a half years later, in the same journal, titled "The Case against the Jew," he opened the floodgates; letters flowed in attacking him as an anti-Semite, even though the article was sympathetic to the suffering of the Jews in Germany, saying that an old man spat on in a train "was prepared for suffering because he had something worth suffering for."

Before a group at a War Resisters League dinner in 1944, he denied being a pacifist, even while admitting that he was a conscientious objector to the present conflict. He opted for a moral revolution, one that was anti-capitalistic because it would be anti-materialist. At about this time, he began promoting the moral revolution with his regular monthly column in the Progressive, for which he wrote for the remainder of his life. His essays often provoked controversy for their insistence that human beings should assume personal responsibility for the world they were creating. In 1968, he signed the "Writers and Editors War Tax Protest" pledge, vowing to refuse tax payments in protest against the Vietnam War.

In the mid-1950s, along with Bayard Rustin, he served on the committee that wrote the Quaker pamphlet, Speak Truth to Power (1955), the most influential pacifist pamphlet published in the United States. During the 1960s, he challenged the government's refusal to grant him a passport when he refused to sign the loyalty oath then required by the State Department. Following the Supreme Court's declaration that the relevant portion of the McCarran Act was unconstitutional, Mayer got his passport.

In an Afterword to the 2017 re-issue of They Thought They Were Free: The Germans, 1933-45, Richard J. Evans presented essential information on how the book was written and raised multiple issues concerning the work. For example, questions can be raised regarding how representative his ten interviewees were. Even though women comprised a significant portion of Nazi support, Mayer failed to include any among his interviewees. Also, except for a single teacher, none of his interviewees was a professional, and none had ever been reasonably financially well-off. In addition, Mayer's treatment of the moderately sized Hessian university town of Marburg (depicted in the book as Kronenburg) as representative for all of Germany is questionable. Marburg lacked a significant industrial sector; under Weimar, it was more conservative than the rest of the country (providing only limited support to the Social Democrats and virtually none to the Communists), and already by 1932 it was more pro-Nazi than the rest of Germany (handing Hitler 49 percent of its vote versus 33 percent elsewhere in Germany). According to Evans, Mayer failed to press his 'ten little people' as hard as he could have on painful, sensitive points, and his political views influenced his conclusions. Despite these observations, Evans describes Mayer's book as "a timely reminder of how otherwise unremarkable and in many ways reasonable people can be seduced by demagogues and populists, and how they can go along with a regime that commits more and more criminal acts until it plunges itself into war and genocide".

== Sources ==
- H. Larry Ingle, "Milton Mayer, Quaker Hedgehog," Quaker Theology #8 (Spring-Summer 2003).
