= DuSable High School =

Public high school in Chicago, Illinois, US

DuSable High School (Campus)
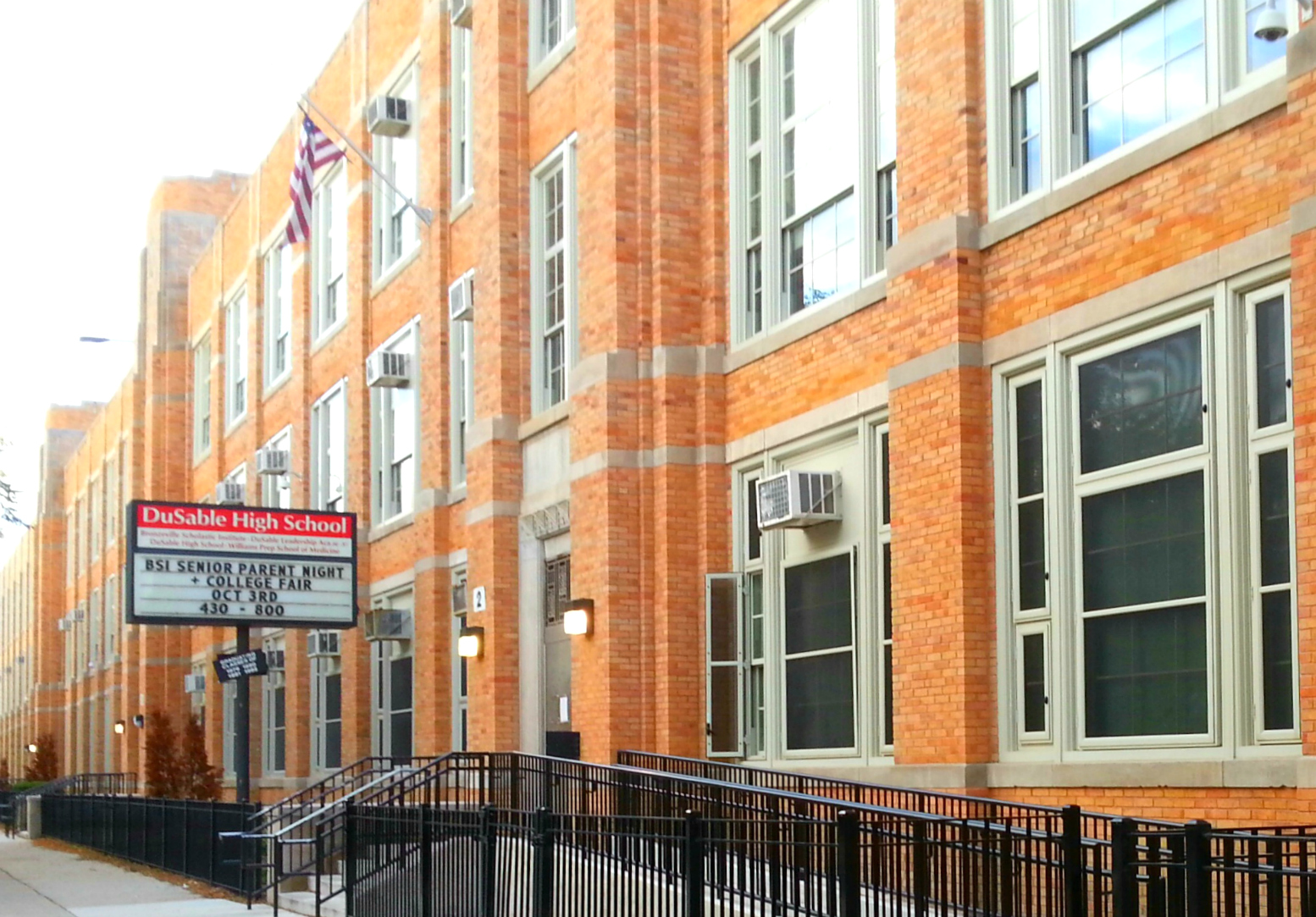

Location
- 4934 S. Wabash Avenue; Chicago, Illinois 60615; United States; 41°48′17″N 87°37′30″W

Information
- School type: Public; Secondary
- Motto: "Peace if possible, but justice at any rate."
- Opened: February 1935; 91 years ago 2005 (Bronzeville); 2005 (Williams Prep)
- Closed: 2016 (DuSable Leadership)
- School district: Chicago Public Schools
- CEEB code: 140981 (Bronzeville); 141109 (Williams Prep)
- Principal: Demetra D. Richardson–Starks (Bronzeville); Leonetta C. Sanders (Williams Prep)
- Grades: 9–12
- Gender: Coed
- Enrollment: 114 (Bronzeville; 2025–26); 82 (Williams Prep; 2025–26)
- Campus type: Urban
- Colors: Red; Black
- Athletics conference: Chicago Public League
- Team name: Panthers
- Accreditation: North Central Association of Colleges and Schools
- Yearbook: Red and Black
- Website: www.bronzevillescholastic.org dhwprepmed.org
- DuSable High School
- Chicago Landmark
- Location within Chicago metropolitan area Location within Illinois Location within the United States
- Location: 4934 S. Wabash Avenue; Chicago, Illinois
- Coordinates: 41°48′17″N 87°37′30″W
- Area: Grand Boulevard
- Built: 1931–1934
- Architect: Paul Gerhardt Sr.
- Architectural style: PWA Moderne
- Designated CHICL: May 1, 2013

Jean Baptiste Point DuSable High School is a public 4–year high school campus in the Bronzeville neighborhood on the South Side of Chicago, Illinois, United States, owned by Chicago Public Schools and named after Chicago's first permanent non-native settler, Jean Baptiste Point Du Sable. Constructed between 1931 and 1934, DuSable opened in 1935.

Since 2005, the school campus has served as home to two smaller schools: the Bronzeville Scholastic Institute and the Daniel Hale Williams Preparatory School of Medicine. Both of the schools use the DuSable name in an athletics context. The DuSable Leadership Academy was also housed at the location until it closed after the 2015–16 school year. The school building was designated a Chicago Landmark in 2013.

== History ==
In 1929, the Chicago Board of Education voted to construct a new school building at East 49th Street and South Wabash Avenue due to the overcrowding conditions at Wendell Phillips Academy High School. Construction on the school began in February 1931 with an estimated cost of $2,500,000. Designed by the school board's architect Paul Gerhardt Sr., The completion date was estimated January 1932 but construction of the school was suspended in December 1931 due to funding issues. Construction resumed on the school in 1934. The school opened on February 4, 1935, and was called New Wendell Phillips High School. New Phillips was a part of a five high school expansion that included Lane Tech High School, Steinmetz High School, Senn High School, and Wells High School.

On April 25, 1936, the school's name was changed to honor Jean Baptiste Point DuSable, the first non-native to settle the area; however there was a delay in implementing the name, as the exact spelling was in dispute. During the 1940s on thru the 1960s, DuSable enrollment was more than 4,000 which prompted two graduation ceremonies (spring and summer). During this period, DuSable became notable for its music program: Captain Walter Dyett was the longtime music instructor at the school. By the early 1960s, DuSable became surrounded by the Robert Taylor Homes, a Chicago Housing Authority public housing project and approximately 80% of the student population were residents.

=== Renaissance 2010 ===
With the demolition of the Robert Taylor Homes (demolition occurred in stages between 1998 and 2007), student enrolment at DuSable had substantially declined. Because of this, in 2003, Chicago Public Schools decided to phase out DuSable: the history of poor academic performance was also a factor. In 2005, three schools were opened in the building as a part of the Renaissance 2010 program. The three new schools: Bronzeville Scholastic Institute, Daniel Hale Williams School of Medicine and DuSable Leadership Academy were created by DuSable staff members. The DuSable Leadership Academy which was a part of the Betty Shabazz International Charter School was phased out due to poor academic performance and closed after the 2015–16 school year.

== Small schools ==
=== Bronzeville ===
Bronzeville Scholastic Institute High School (BSI) is a public 4–year high school located in the Bronzeville neighborhood on the south side of Chicago, Illinois, United States. The school is named after the community in which it is located, Bronzeville. In 1930, the editor of the Chicago Bee used the name in a campaign to elect the "mayor of Bronzeville". After a physician was elected in 1945, the community began to use the name Bronzeville. It reflected both the dominant skin color of the members of the community, and an attempt to raise the community's and outsiders' favor toward the area, as the word "bronze" had a more positive connotation than "black." Bronzeville Scholastic Institute was opened in 2005 as a Performance School in the Chicago Public Schools' Renaissance 2010, which was an effort to create more quality schools across the city of Chicago.

=== Williams Prep ===
Daniel Hale Williams Preparatory School of Medicine High School (DHW) is a public 4–year career academy high school and academic center. The academic center serves 9th through 12th grade students. The school opened in September 2005 as a part of the Chicago Public Schools' Renaissance 2010 program. The school is named for Daniel Hale Williams, an African-American doctor who performed the first successful open heart surgery. Helping minority students get into medical school and become future members of the medical field is central to DHW's mission and vision. The school celebrated its first graduating class in 2011.

== Enrollment and demographics ==
As of the 2025–2026 school year, DuSable Campus has a total enrollment of 192 students, with 114 attending Bronzeville and 82 enrolled in Williams Prep. Of the student population, 93% identify as Black or African American, and 7% identify as Hispanic or Latino.

Student Demographics (2025–2026)
1. Black or African-American (93.0%)
2. Hispanic or Latino (7.00%)
3. Non-Hispanic White (0.00%)
4. Asian (0.00%)
5. Multiracial (0.00%)
6. Native American or Pacific Islander (0.00%)

== Other information ==
Chicago Public Schools and the Chicago Board of Education opened a birth control clinic in the school in June 1985, in efforts to lower the school's high teen-age pregnancy and drop-out rates. The opening of the clinic caused worldwide controversy. The school once held an inner sanctuary that had many different animals, including peacocks, a goat, snakes, pigeons, chickens, and various other species. Emiel Hamberlin, the schools' biology teacher and sanctuary was featured in the March 1977 issue of Ebony magazine. In 1994, then-DuSable principal Charles Mingo created the "Second-Chance Program", a program that served as an alternative school for recent high school drop-outs and adults looking to earn a high school diploma. In 1995, with funding from NASA, DuSable became the first public high school in Chicago to be connected to the Internet.

=== Crime and gang violence ===
In November 1949, 16–year old LaVon Cain was shot to death at the school after a group of females began firing shots at another group of female students. 19–year-old Edwina Howard and two other teenage girls were charged in the shooting. The shooting is recorded as one of the first fatal shootings in a Chicago public school. In October 1959, two female students were sexually assaulted by a male mail carrier in the school. In September 1968, twelve students were arrested in a gang retaliation shooting at the school. By 1976, the school had developed a reputation for concurring problems with gang violence. In January 1986, a 15–year-old male student was stabbed by another student. On October 13, 1987, 15–year-old freshmen Dartagnan Young was shot to death in a gang–related shooting in the hallway on the school's third floor shortly after 8 a.m. by 16–year-old sophomore Larry Sims. Witnesses said Young was shot after arguing with Sims over street–gang activity from the previous day. The murder prompted some students to transfer from DuSable that day and days following.

== Athletics ==
DuSable competes in the Chicago Public League (CPL) and is a member of the Illinois High School Association (IHSA). DuSable sport teams are nicknamed Panthers. The boys' basketball team were Public League champions two times (1952–53, 1953–54) and regional champions twice (2011–12, 2012–13), Sectionals champion in 2012. The girls' track and field team were Class AA in 1977–78. The boys' track and field were public league champions in 1937–38 and placed 3rd during the 1941–42 season.

== Notable alumni ==
=== Performing arts ===
- Muhal Richard Abrams (1948) — musician
- Gene Ammons (1943) — jazz tenor saxophone player.
- Fred Below (1944) — Chicago blues drummer
- Ronnie Boykins (1954) — jazz bassist, known for his association with Sun Ra.
- Sonny Cohn (1943) — jazz trumpet player, spent 24 years with the orchestra of Count Basie.
- Nat King Cole (attended) — pianist and crooner, predominantly of pop and jazz works ("Unforgettable"). Cole was a 1990 recipient of a Grammy Lifetime Achievement Award, and in 2000, he was elected into the Rock and Roll Hall of Fame.
- Jerome Cooper (1965) — jazz musician who specialized in percussion.
- Richard Davis (1948) — bassist and professor of music at the University of Wisconsin–Madison.
- Dorothy Donegan (1940) — jazz pianist.
- Redd Foxx (attended) — standup comedian and actor, known for his role on the television series Sanford and Son.
- Von Freeman (1942) — jazz tenor saxophonist.
- John Gilmore (1949) — clarinet and saxophone player, member of the Sun Ra Arkestra, a group he led after Sun Ra's death.
- Johnny Griffin (1946) — bebop and hard bop tenor saxophone player.
- Eddie Harris (1953) — jazz musician best known for playing tenor saxophone and for introducing the electrically amplified saxophone.
- Johnny Hartman (1941) — jazz singer ("Lush Life"), worked with John Coltrane.
- Rosalind Hayes (1938) — actress and model
- Red Holloway (1945) – jazz musician.
- Fred Hopkins (1966) — jazz bassist.
- Joseph Jarman (1956) — jazz composer, percussionist, clarinetist, and saxophonist.
- Ella Jenkins (1942) — Grammy Award–winning musician and singer best known for her work in folk music and children's music.
- Leroy Jenkins (1950) — violinist who worked mostly in free jazz.
- Clifford Jordan (1949) — jazz saxophonist.
- Walter Perkins (1950) — jazz percussionist.
- Julian Priester (1953) — jazz trombone player.
- Marshall Thompson (1961) — singer and musician, member of the R&B/Soul vocal group The Chi-Lites.
- Wilbur Ware (1942) — hard bebop bassist
- Dinah Washington (attended) — Grammy Award–winning jazz singer (What a Diff'rence a Day Makes, "Teach Me Tonight"). She was inducted into the Rock and Roll Hall of Fame in 1993 as an "early influence".

=== Public service ===
- Timuel Black (1937) — historian and civil rights activist.
- William Cousins (1945) — Illinois Appellate Court judge and Chicago City Council member
- Fred Rice Jr. (1944) — Chicago police officer, first permanent African–American superintendent of the Chicago Police Department.
- Harold Washington (1939) —Lawyer and politician. Washington served as the 51st Mayor of Chicago (1983–1987), Noted as the city's first African American mayor.

=== Sports ===
- Charlie Brown (1954) — College basketball All-American, 1957–1959 Seattle University.
- Maurice Cheeks (1974) — NBA guard (1978–93), head coach of Philadelphia 76ers, Portland Trail Blazers, Detroit Pistons.
- Nathaniel Clifton (1942) — basketball and baseball athlete for DuSable, played for Harlem Globetrotters and Chicago American Giants, Nat "Sweetwater" Clifton was 2014 inductee in Basketball Hall of Fame.
- Ernie McMillan (1956) — NFL offensive tackle (1961–75), 4-time Pro Bowl selection.
- Shellie McMillon (1954) — NBA forward (1958–62), Detroit Pistons, St. Louis Hawks.
- Kevin Porter (1968) — NBA guard (1972–81, 82–83), Detroit Pistons, Washington Bullets, 4-time league assists leader
- Red Pryor (1944) — NBL guard (1948–49), Dayton Rens
- Jason Williams (2004) — NFL linebacker (2009–14) for Carolina Panthers and Dallas Cowboys.
- Chuck Winfrey (1967) — NFL linebacker (1971–72).

=== Radio, TV, and film ===
- Don Cornelius (1954) — television show host and producer, creator and host of Soul Train. (1971–93).

=== Commerce ===
- Vincent T. Cullers (attended) — founder of the first African American advertising agency.
- John H. Johnson (1936) — founder of Johnson Publishing Company (Ebony, Jet), and the first African American on the Forbes list of the richest 400 Americans.

=== Alumni gallery ===
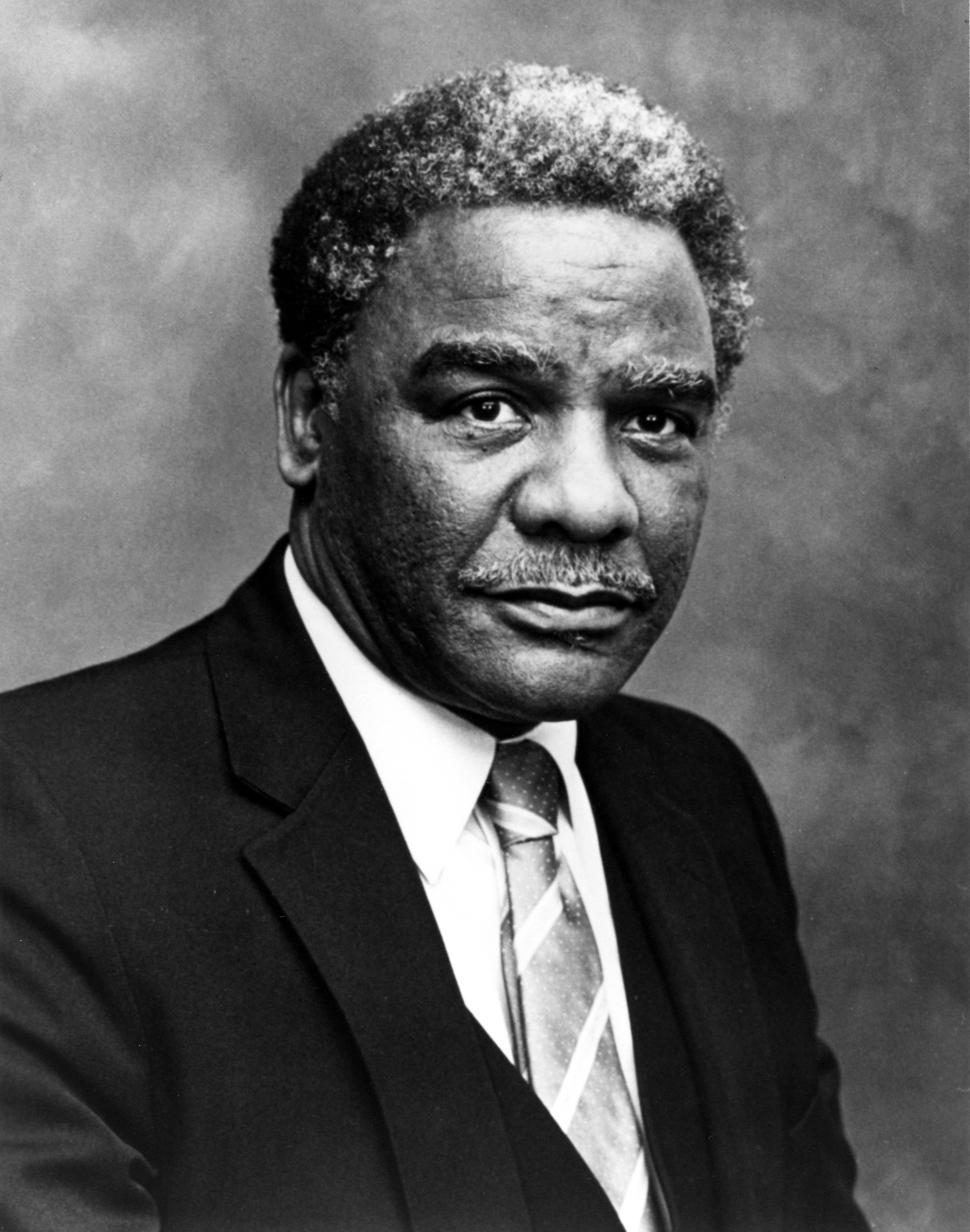
Harold Washington

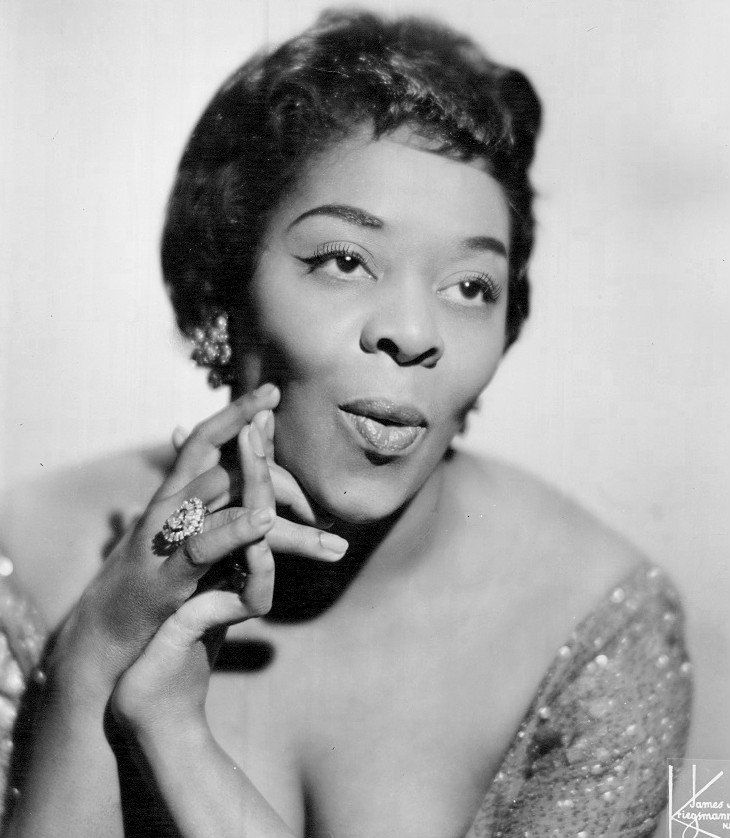
Dinah Washington

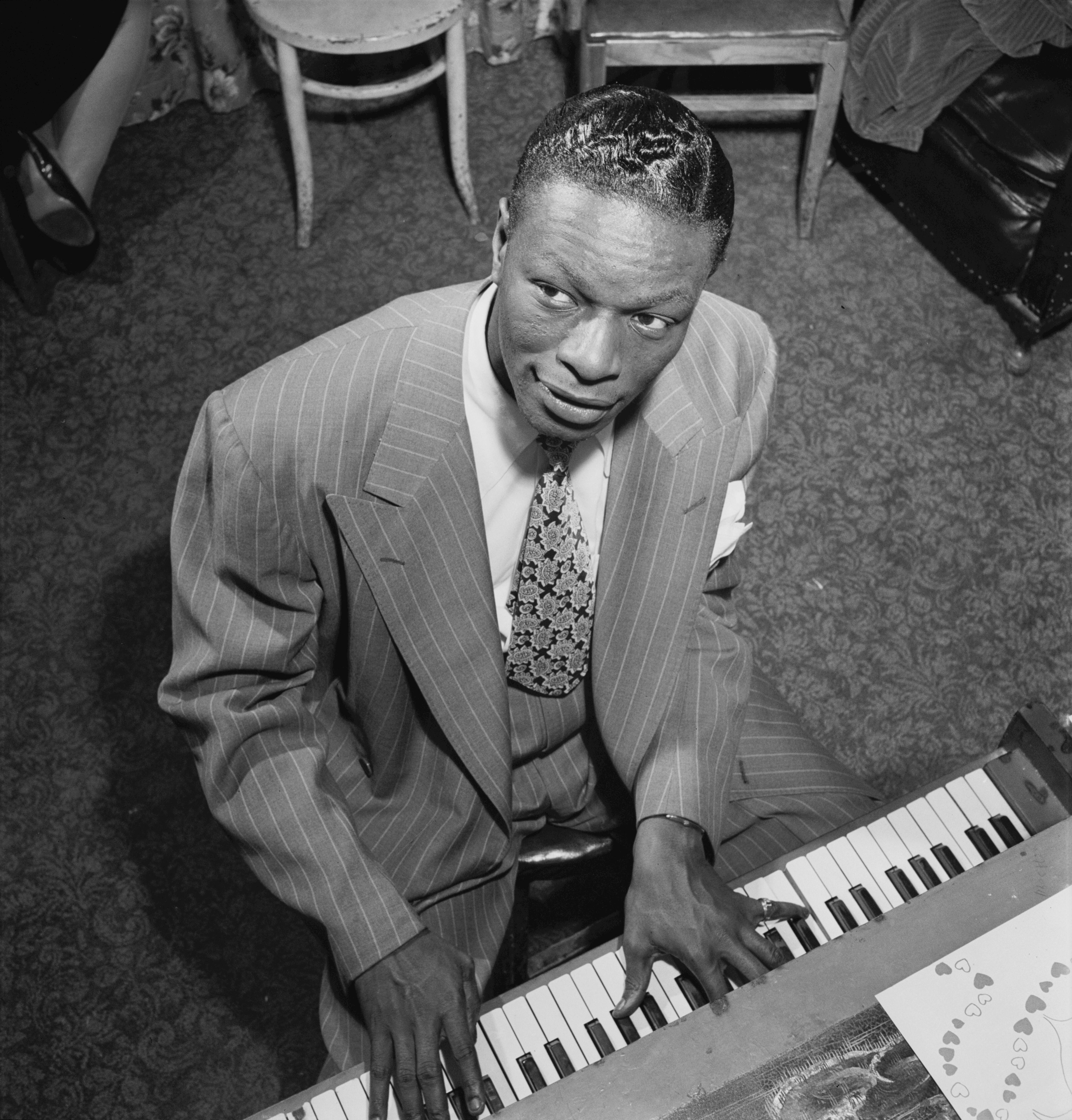
Nat "King" Cole

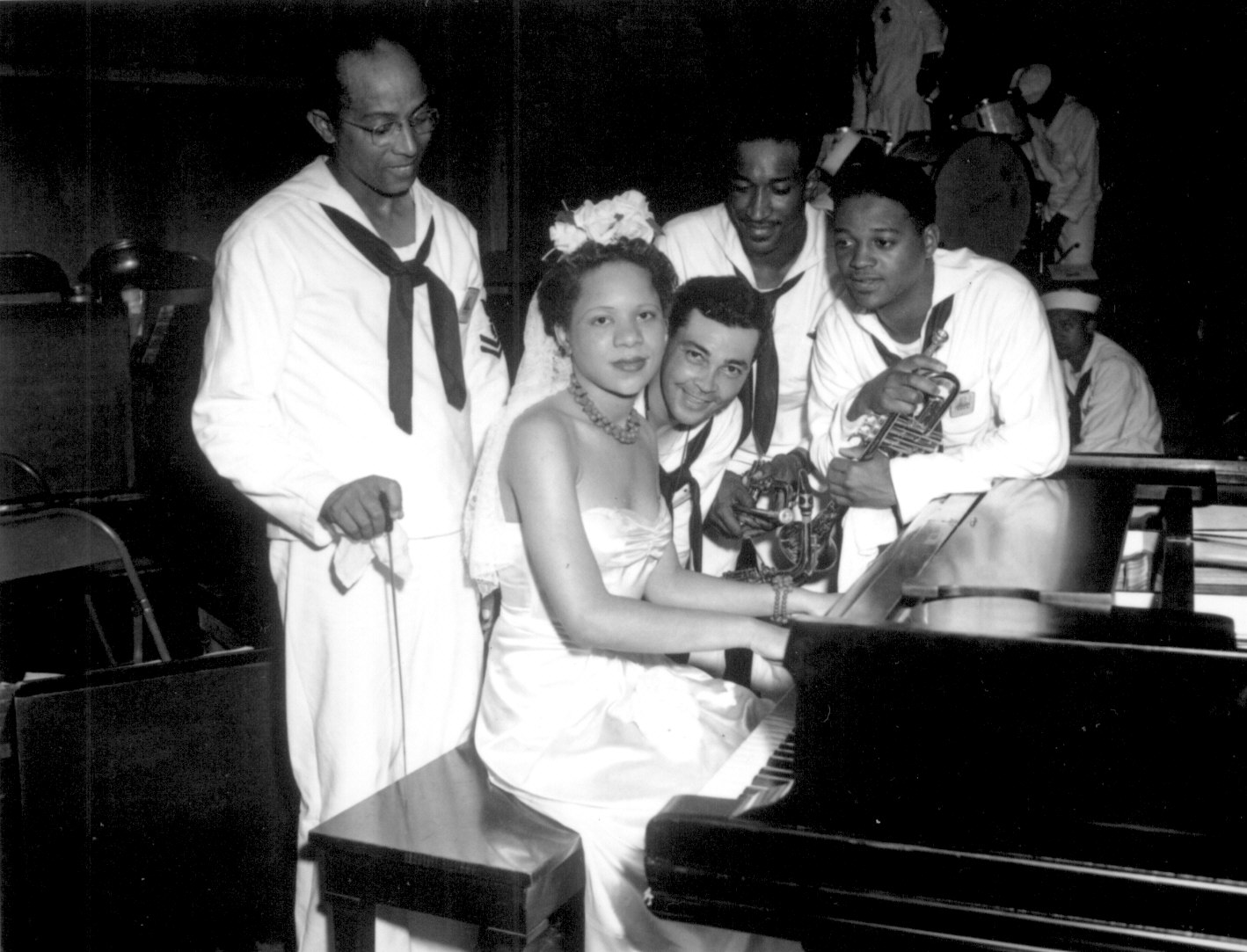
Dorothy Donegan

== Notable staff ==
- Captain Walter Dyett — noted violinist and music instructor at the school from its opening in 1935 until 1962.
- Emiel Hamberlin – educator, science teacher at DuSable from 1967 until 2004. Hamberlin earned several awards for his work at the school including induction into the National Teacher's Hall of Fame in 2001.
- Charles Mingo — educator and former principal of DuSable from 1988 until 2002, his work at the school earned him a Milken National Educator Award in 1993.
- Margaret Taylor-Burroughs — writer and artist who taught at the school for 23 years (1946-1969). She was best known for co-founding the DuSable Museum of African American History.
