= The Catalyst Schools =

US charter school system

- Location: Chicago, Illinois
- Website: http://www.catalystschools.org

The Catalyst Schools is a system of Chicago-based K-8 and high school charter schools operating in the city's Austin and Chicago Lawn neighborhoods. The two schools in the system are the Catalyst Circle Rock Elementary School (Austin) and the Catalyst Maria Elementary School and High School (Chicago Lawn).

== History ==
=== The San Miguel Schools ===
The Catalyst Schools grew out of Chicago's San Miguel Schools, which were founded by Brother Ed Siderewicz and Gordon Hannon in 1995 when they met with a group of 18 students and a staff of four in a convent dining room in the Back of the Yards neighborhood. Today, the Back of the Yards campus serves mostly Hispanics; a second campus in Austin, which opened in 2002 but closed in 2012, served mostly African-American students.

Students at the San Miguel Schools saw increased academic success; in the San Miguel neighborhood, the average high-school graduation rate was 40% while more than 94% of students at San Miguel graduated from high school. San Miguel graduates also attended college at greater rates than those of their peers.

=== Planning for the Catalyst Schools ===
During their individual tenures in office, Chicago Public Schools CEOs Paul Vallas and Arne Duncan each asked the San Miguel Schools’ Board of Directors to replicate the San Miguel Schools' academic model and values in the free-tuition charter school model. Some San Miguel Board members were initially apprehensive about the potentially negative public response to replicating a faith-based institution in the public charter context. Nevertheless, the Board investigated the possibility further and determined ways it could be done without undermining Church-State separation.

When in June 2004 Chicago Mayor Richard M. Daley launched Renaissance 2010, an initiative to increase the number of high quality educational options in communities across Chicago by 2010, the San Miguel Board of Directors had the impetus they needed to move forward. They incorporated the Catalyst Schools as a separate 501(c)(3) nonprofit educational institution in 2005.

Also in 2005, Catalyst submitted a proposal to the Chicago Board of Education to establish the first Catalyst Charter School in the North Lawndale neighborhood. Located in the former Howland Elementary School, the new Catalyst Howland Charter school opened in Fall 2006 with 60 students in grades 4 and 5 and a mission "to provide quality elementary educational choice to urban students who have not been adequately served by existing educational institutions through the use of a curriculum and instruction that focuses on reading and math." In later years, Catalyst Howland added additional grades with the capacity to serve as many as 540 students, or full enrollment (60 per grade) in grades K-8. After eleven years of service, however, Catalyst Howland closed voluntarily in July 2016.

Also in 2005, a second proposal was submitted to the Chicago Public Schools Board of Education to establish Catalyst Circle Rock Elementary School. This new school, which replaced Circle Rock Elementary established by the Austin-based nonprofit agency Circle Urban Ministries, opened in fall 2007 initially as a Contract School under the Renaissance 2010 plan. The school started with approximately 60 students in grades 4 and 5, with plans to add grades 6, 7, and 8. In 2007, the proposal was amended and approved so that Catalyst Circle Rock could open with 250 students in grades K-8 and grow to 540 students in later years. The school's address changed to 5608 West Washington Boulevard but remained in Chicago's Austin neighborhood.

In 2009, a proposal was submitted to the Chicago Public Schools Board of Education to convert the Catalyst Circle Rock Elementary School, which had been operating as a contract public school, into a charter school. The charter was approved, and Catalyst Circle Rock Charter Elementary school followed the mission of the first Catalyst Charter School: providing quality education through a focus on reading and math to urban students whose needs have not previously been met by other institutions.

=== Expansion to Chicago Lawn: Catalyst Maria Elementary and High Schools ===
The Need for Performing Schools in Chicago's Neighborhoods, an October 2004 report by the Illinois Facilities Fund (IFF), named Chicago Lawn among the city's top 25 communities needing elementary and high schools. Complicating school choice in the Chicago Lawn neighborhood was the June 30, 2013, closing of Maria High School, a private all-girls high school operated by the Sisters of St. Casimir that had served the community for more than a century.

To fill the gap, Maria High School leaders invited the Catalyst Schools to propose a replication of its successful charter program in Chicago Lawn. The proposed school was also a response to a special interest by the Chicago Public Schools in implementing educational change and choice on the city's Southwest Side. Additionally, opening charter schools in high-need neighborhoods where parochial schools were closing had been an interest of Chicago Mayor Rahm Emanuel. A team of Catalyst Schools and Maria High School leaders therefore developed a multi-year strategy to offer the same quality education that Maria provided but tuition-free, coeducational, and with a K-8 division. In December 2011, Chicago Public Schools granted Catalyst a charter to open the Catalyst Maria Charter Elementary School and High School in the Maria High School building.

Catalyst Maria opened in four incremental phases: Fall 2012: K-5 and 9th grade; Fall 2013: Addition of 6th and 10th grades, and 50 students each in grades 11 and 12; Fall 2014: Addition of 7th grade and completion of full enrollment in grades 11 and 12; Fall 2015: Full enrollment, K–12 (1,100 students: 540 in K–8 and 560 in 9–12).

In 2012, Catalyst purchased the eight-acre Maria campus from the Sisters of St. Casimir. This included the 198,000 square-foot school building at the corner of Marquette Road and California Avenue. Through fundraising efforts, Catalyst invested $1.8 million in capital improvements to the facility, including technology, furniture and equipment for the elementary school, and everything needed to ensure the physical plant met ADA and building code requirements. The investment, made possible through private philanthropy, provided a Science, Technology, Engineering, and Math (STEM) curriculum to begin in kindergarten and continue through twelfth grade.

== Educational approach ==
The Catalyst Schools offer a college-preparatory educational experience. Since many students arrive with below-average math and reading skills, teachers focus on math, reading, and language arts every day for 80 minutes each. Because this adds up to 1,200 minutes of core instruction per week, the school days are longer than those at traditional schools to leave time for gym, cultural enrichment, and other activities. At the Catalyst Schools, the school week is 2,100 minutes, whereas the typical week at a Chicago Public Schools school is 1,500 minutes. The schools also work to make sure that students and their parents are prepared for the transition to high school by equipping them with practical life skills and helping them complete high school applications. After graduating from eighth grade at the Catalyst Schools, students are tracked for four years by the schools to assure that they have assistance in seeking employment or searching for a college as well.

The Catalyst Schools teach values in addition to core subjects like reading and math. For example, the students are met at the front door each school day by a teacher or administrator who shakes their hands and gives a word of encouragement. Positive relationship is one way in which Catalyst blends public, private, and faith-based education models. Others include:

A Culture of Peace and Calm – Mutual respect and trust translates to an environment in which scholars feel safe and learn without unnecessary anxiety.

Higher Order Thinking and Problem Solving - the inquiry method is especially important in math and science instruction.

Renaissance Fine Arts - During weekly Renaissance Enrichment classes, leading arts nonprofits introduce scholars to the arts through music, dance, and other creative pursuits. In partnership with Chicago's Ravinia Festival, the Sistema Ravinia symphonic orchestra at Circle Rock is the largest African-American elementary school orchestra in the nation.

Social-Emotional Learning - Social workers and special education teams on the Circle Rock staff help scholars overcome the emotional barriers preventing them from classroom success. By untangling their frustrations, anxieties, and confusions, the staff enable scholars to concentrate on learning.

Service Learning - Scholars participate in age appropriate service learning programs that help them understand the importance of a positive and productive relationship with the community.

The graduation ceremonies celebrate achievement, unity, and a symbolic passing of the torch. Before the ceremony, teachers present neckties to eighth-grade students both as a symbol of maturation and to complete their high school uniforms. Later in the ceremony, eighth-grade students bestow ties on their seventh-grade colleagues to symbolize that it is the next class's turn to lead.

=== Achievements and Honors ===
The goal is for every Catalyst scholar to graduate from high school on time and enter college, or a meaningful trade, five years after eighth grade graduation. As of Fall 2018, 87% of all Catalyst Circle Rock alumni of high school age and older have graduated from high school within four years. Additionally, of the Circle Rock Classes of 2008 and 2009 (post-college-age alumni), 41% have completed college, 26% are still in college, 20% are working with some college experience, and 13% are working with no college experience. At Catalyst Maria High School, 100% of the Class of 2017 were accepted to college, receiving 829 acceptance letters and $15.3 million in scholarship offers. Seventy-nine Maria graduates received full-tuition college scholarships.

In spring 2015, the Chicago Board of Education awarded Catalyst Circle Rock a full five-year (2015–2020) renewal of its charter without conditions, and in spring 2017, it awarded a full five-year charter renewal without conditions to Catalyst Maria (2017–2022). Catalyst Maria High School also received AdvancED accreditation, meaning the school is performing at or above expectations in five main standards defining excellent schools. CPS awarded Catalyst Circle Rock a Level 1 rating and Catalyst Maria a Level 1+ rating—the two highest ratings CPS gives schools in its network. The University of Chicago's “My School, My Voice” 2017 survey ranked the Catalyst Schools network Well Organized, its highest rating possible.

=== The Kehrein Center for the Arts ===
Catalyst is currently in the process of developing a new performing arts venue for the Austin neighborhood by restoring a mid-twentieth-century auditorium in its Circle Rock school building at Central Avenue and Washington Boulevard. Designed in 1954 for the Archdiocese of Chicago by Belli & Belli Architects and serving for twenty years as the main performing arts space for Siena High School, the auditorium evokes the neo-futuristic designs of Finnish-American architect Eero Saarinen. It is a sculpture of masonry and poured-in-place concrete with curving walls and three-dimensional spaces that interlock with a library and exterior courtyard.

It is anticipated that the $4 million project will be open to the public in early 2019. When completed, the Kehrein Center for the Arts, named in memory of community leader Glen Kehrein, will provide Austin and the West Side with a performance space that features a 1,000-seat auditorium for performing arts, cinema, and special events; and a gallery for the exhibition of local art. The Kehrein Center is slated to be one of the area's largest and most versatile performing arts and public community centers.
