= Art Folz =

American football player (1903–1965)

Profile
- Positions: Fullback, halfback, quarterback

Personal information
- Born: March 31, 1903; Chicago, Illinois, U.S.
- Died: August 18, 1965 (aged 62); Los Angeles, California, U.S.
- Listed height: 5 ft 7 in (1.70 m)
- Listed weight: 157 lb (71 kg)

Career information
- High school: Englewood (IL)
- College: Chicago

Career history
- 1923–1925: Chicago Cardinals

Awards and highlights
- NFL champion (1925)
- Stats at Pro Football Reference

Arthur F. Folz a.k.a. Art Foltz (March 31, 1903 – August 18, 1965) was an American professional football player with the Chicago Cardinals of the National Football League (NFL) from 1923 to 1925. He is best known for his role in the 1925 Chicago Cardinals–Milwaukee Badgers scandal, where Folz hired a group of high school football players from his alma mater, Chicago's Engelwood High School, to play for the Milwaukee Badgers, against the Cardinals. During the recruitment, Folz reportedly told the high schoolers that the game was a "practice game" and would in no part affect their amateur status.

The plan would ensure an inferior opponent for Chicago. The game was then used to help prop up their win-loss percentage and as a chance of wrestling away the 1925 NFL Championship away from the first place Pottsville Maroons. For his involvement, Folz was barred from playing football in the NFL for life by NFL President Joseph Carr. However, in 1926, Folz's lifetime ban was lifted, probably to prevent him from joining the first American Football League; even so, he chose not to return to pro football.

The scandal also played a role in the 1925 NFL Championship controversy.
