= Johnny Heimsch =

American football player (1902–1991)

Profile
- Position: Halfback

Personal information
- Born: September 18, 1902; Rosebush, Michigan, U.S.
- Died: May 27, 1991 (aged 88); Oneida County, Wisconsin, U.S.
- Listed height: 5 ft 10 in (1.78 m)
- Listed weight: 175 lb (79 kg)

Career information
- College: Marquette

Career history
- Milwaukee Badgers (1926)

Career statistics
- Touchdowns: 3
- Stats at Pro Football Reference

John Cyrus Heimsch (September 18, 1902 – May 27, 1991) was a halfback in the National Football League. He played with the Milwaukee Badgers during the 1926 NFL season. He also played baseball.
