= Vincent T. Cullers =

American designer and civil rights activist

- Born: 1924; Chicago, Illinois, U.S.
- Died: October 4, 2003 (aged 78–79); Chicago, Illinois, U.S.
- Education: DuSable High School; Art Institute of Chicago
- Occupations: Designer; advertising professional; civil rights activist
- Years active: 1955–1999
- Spouse: Marian Barnett
- Children: 2

Vincent T. Cullers (b. 1924 – October 4, 2003) was an American designer, advertising professional, and civil rights activist. Motivated by the civil rights movement in the United States, Vince Cullers made history in 1956 by founding Vince Cullers Advertising, recognized as the first African American-owned advertising agency.

== Biography ==
Cullers was born in Chicago in 1924 in the Bronzeville neighborhood. Cullers was the son of Samuel and Letitia Terry Cullers. He had one brother, Roosevelt, and one sister, Althea. After graduating DuSable High School, Cullers attended the Art Institute of Chicago. As World War II broke out and the United States entered the conflict, Cullers enlisted in the Marine Corps where he became a combat artist serving in the South Pacific region. While illustrating combat scenes and everyday life in battle, a fellow soldier, Eugene, showed him a picture of his cousin, Marian Barnett from Champaign, Illinois, with whom he fell in love. Upon returning to Chicago, the two were formally introduced, began dating, and married, having two sons, Vincent (Terry) Jr. and Jeffery. By this time, Cullers had a good portfolio and began looking for work as an illustrator at various advertising agencies in Chicago and New York. Segregation and racism prevented him from getting the job he wanted. According to his son, Jeffery:

"In those days, no African-Americans were working in advertising. They not only couldn't get in the door, they didn't go beyond the lobby.

Cullers worked as a freelance illustrator until in 1953 he landed a position as art director for Ebony magazine, which earned him the money he needed to start his own business. In 1954, the Supreme Court ruled in Brown v. Board of Education, that racial segregation in schools was unconstitutional. A year later, Rosa Parks' refusal to give up her bus seat led to a boycott of buses in Montgomery, Alabama.

=== Vince Cullers Advertising ===
In 1956, Cullers founded Vince Cullers Advertising. While he handled the artwork, his wife Marian was responsible for administration, later becoming vice president. The mission of the agency was to open up the advertising market to the African-American audience and to change the way advertising was done for this audience. In its founding year revenues were less than ten thousand dollars. In 1968, a major contract was signed with Lorillard Tobacco Company. Cullers created a campaign for them starring a black man wearing a traditional dashiki clothing. Next, Johnson Products Company hired Vince for their Afro-Sheen campaign, a line of hair products for black people, famous for creating the slogan "Wantu Wazuri". Other clients served by the agency were Pizza Hut, Sears, and Kellogg's. In 1973, the annual revenue was already US$2.5 million. In 1990 it was US$20 million. The agency also helped produce TV programs, including "Soul Train TV" and the radio program "Lu's Notebook", which was on the air for ten years.

== Last years and death ==
In 1997, the agency went through a restructuring. Cullers turned the business over to his youngest son, Jeffery Cullers, but continued as president. Cullers died on October 4, 2003, at age 79, at Kindred Chicago Lakeshore Hospital from heart failure.
