= Ambrose McGuirk =

American sports executive

Profile
- Position: Owner

Career history

owner
- 1922–1925: Milwaukee Badgers

Awards and highlights
- Key figure in the Cardinals-Badgers scandal

Ambrose Leo McGuirk was the first owner of the Milwaukee Badgers of the National Football League. He is best known for being ordered to sell the Badgers for his role in the 1925 Chicago Cardinals-Milwaukee Badgers scandal, in which four Chicago-area high school football players were employed by the Badgers for one game, a 59-0 loss against the Chicago Cardinals. When the scandal was discovered by NFL president Joe Carr, McGuirk was ordered to sell his Milwaukee franchise within 90 days. However Carr later decided that the penalty on McGuirk was too harsh and rescinded his earlier order. However by this time McGuirk had already sold the franchise to Chicago Bears fullback, Johnny Bryan.

Under McGuirk, the Badgers had entered the league in 1922, and through 1924 they were successful in fielding a competitive team. However 1925 saw the team go 0-6.

== See also ==
- 1925 Chicago Cardinals-Milwaukee Badgers scandal

Preceded by First	Milwaukee Badgers Owners; 1922-1925	Succeeded by Johnny Bryan
