= Budge Garrett =

American football player and coach (1893–1950)

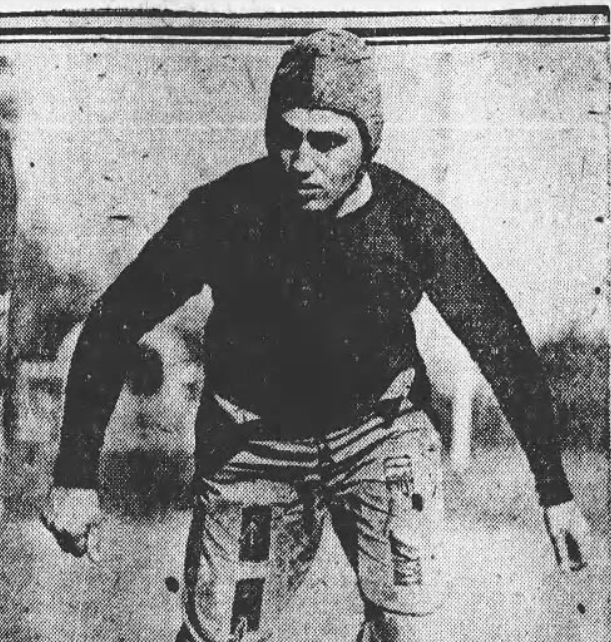
- Garrett with the Akron Pros

Profile
- Positions: Fullback, End, Guard

Personal information
- Born: April 17, 1893; Muskogee, Oklahoma, U.S.
- Died: June 11, 1950 (aged 57); Verona, New Jersey, U.S.
- Listed height: 5 ft 9 in (1.75 m)
- Listed weight: 200 lb (91 kg)

Career information
- High school: Peddie School (Hightstown, New Jersey)
- College: Rutgers

Career history

Playing
- Youngstown Patricians (1917); Massillon Tigers (1917–1919); Akron Pros (1920); Milwaukee Badgers (1922)

Coaching
- Milwaukee Badgers (1922)

Awards and highlights
- NFL champion (1920); Third-team All-American (1916)

Career statistics
- Games played: 13
- Games started: 6
- Stats at Pro Football Reference

Head coaching record
- Career: 2–1–3 (.583)
- Coaching profile at Pro Football Reference

Alfred Tennyson "Budge" Garrett (April 17, 1893 – June 11, 1950) was an American professional football player with the Akron Pros of the American Professional Football Association (APFA) (renamed the National Football League in 1922). During his one year with the Pros he won the first AFPA/NFL Championship. He returned to the NFL in 1922 as a player-coach for the Milwaukee Badgers, compiling a 2–1–3 record.

Prior to joining the NFL, Garrett grew up in Oklahoma on a Creek Indian Reservation. He later attended a played college football at Rutgers University. He later made the 1915 College Football All-America Team. He first played professional football for the Massillon Tigers and Youngstown Patricians of the "Ohio League", during the pre-NFL era.
