= Merri Dee =

American philanthropist and journalist (1936–2022)

- Dee in 2013
- Born: Mary Francine Dorham; October 30, 1936; Chicago, Illinois
- Died: March 16, 2022 (aged 85); Chicago
- Education: Xavier University of Louisiana (attended); Midwestern Broadcasting School
- Occupations: News anchor; television personality; philanthropist
- Years active: 1966–2022
- Notable credits: WGN-TV (community development director, 1983–2008; anchor/ reporter, 1972–83); WSNS-TV (talk show host, 1971–72); WCIU-TV (host, 1968–70); WBEE (radio show host, 1966–68)
- Spouse: Nicolas Fulop (m. 1999)
- Children: 2
- Website: merridee.com

Mary Francine Dorham, or Merri Dee (October 30, 1936 – March 16, 2022), was an American philanthropist and television journalist. Dee was best known for her work as an anchor/reporter at Chicago television station and national cable superstation WGN-TV (Channel 9) from 1972 to 1983, and director of community relations from 1983 to 2008. Dee served as president and member of the leadership council of the Illinois chapter of the American Association of Retired Persons (AARP) from 2009 until her death in 2022.

== Biography ==
=== Early life and education ===
Dee was born Mary Francine Dorham on October 30, 1936 in Chicago, Illinois, to John Blouin, a postal worker, and Ethel Dorham. Her mother went into labor during a trip to Chicago with her husband as they went back and forth between Chicago and New Orleans due to work. She was raised Catholic.

After her mother died in 1939, 2-year-old Dee was raised in New Orleans, and her father remarried four years later. The youngest of six children, her stepmother abused her and sent her to an orphanage. Dee described growing up with her stepmother in an interview with Contemporary Black Biography:

I was terrifically abused by her... She adopted me [after Blouin's death] and changed my name so my family couldn't help me. It was horrible.

Dee returned to Chicago as a teenager and began attending Englewood Technical Prep Academy, graduating in 1955. After high school, Dee returned to New Orleans to attend Xavier University, pursuing a degree in business administration; she eventually dropped out, finding a job as a salesperson with IBM to support her siblings. Dee landed her first hosting job at radio station WBEE, located in Harvey, Illinois.

=== Career in radio ===
In the two years that followed, Dee became a local celebrity in Chicago radio. In 1968, she began hosting an entertainment program on a then-fledgling independent station WCIU (channel 26) on Saturday nights. In 1971, Dee became the host of The Merri Dee Show, a local talk show on then-independent station WSNS (channel 44, now a Telemundo owned-and-operated station).

On July 17, 1971, Dee and amateur psychic Alan Sandler, a guest on her show, were kidnapped and shot. Sandler died, while Dee survived. The two had gone out to dinner, and upon returning to the WSNS-TV studio, their car was approached by 21-year-old Samuel Drew. Drew then made Dee drive to a remote area, where he shot each of them twice in the back of the head at point-blank range before dumping them out of the car and driving off. Dee managed to crawl to a highway, where she was rescued, taken to a hospital, and treated for her wounds. Doctors did not expect her to survive, and Dee was read her last rites twice, once by personal friend Reverend Jesse Jackson.

After a year of recovery from the attack, Dee returned to broadcasting in 1972, becoming an anchor for then-independent station WGN-TV's 10 p.m. newscast. After spending eleven years at WGN-TV in various on-air positions, Dee moved into an off-air position in 1984, becoming the station's director of community development and manager of WGN-TV Children's Charities, where she remained until she retired from the station in the fall of 2008, helping raise $31 million in donations for the station's various charity initiatives during that tenure. Dee subsequently joined the Mayor's Advisory Council on Women for the City of Chicago and became a member of the volunteer Executive Council of the Illinois chapter of AARP, before being appointed AARP State President a year later.

=== Charity work and accolades ===
In addition to her television and radio work, Dee has also served in various capacities as a part of several charities and organizations. Dee helped draft the country's first-ever Victims' Bill of Rights in 1992, passed by the Illinois state legislature, and served as a model for other states to pass their own victim's rights legislation. She founded the Chicago-based program Athletes for a Better Education. Dee served as the television host of the United Negro College Fund's "Evening of Stars" fundraiser for over two decades and also hosted telethons benefiting Easter Seals. Dee also developed "The Waiting Child", an on-air segment broadcast on WGN-TV, highlighting children in the child placement system needing adoptive homes. The initiative earned Dee several awards, including being honored with the Adoption Excellence Award from the U.S. Department of Health and Human Services in 2004.

Then-Illinois governor Jim Edgar gave Dee and WGN-TV a commendation in 1998 for contributing to a 50 percent increase in the number of adoptions in the state. In 2000, she was honored with an honorary Doctorate of Humanities by Lewis University; the following year, Dee won the Academy of Television Arts and Sciences' Silver Circle Award. The University of Illinois' Center on Women and Gender also honored Dee with a Lifetime Achievement Award in 2003; and in 2004, she was honored with a President's Award by the United Negro College Fund.

Dee also served as an executive board member for the Ronald McDonald House Charities, Junior Achievement Worldwide, and the Associated Colleges of Illinois; as board member for The National College Summit and member of the Illinois State Attorney's Council on Violence. In January 2011, Dee became one of six inductees into the National Association of Black Journalists’ Hall of Fame.

== Personal life ==
Dee married twice and had two children. Her first marriage was in her late teens and produced a daughter, Toya Monet. She also had an adopted son, attorney Richard H. Wright. Dee was married to her second husband, Nicolas Fulop, from 1999 until her death which was reported on March 16, 2022; according to family members, she had died overnight in her sleep at home.
