= They Thought They Were Free =

1955 book

They Thought They Were Free: The Germans 1933-45 is a nonfiction book by Milton Mayer, first published by the University of Chicago Press in 1955. It describes ordinary German citizens' thought processes during the Nazi regime.

August Heckscher, the chief writer of editorials of the New York Herald Tribune, wrote that the book "suggests how easy it is for human beings in any society to fall prey to a dynamic political movement, provided their lives are sufficiently insecure, frustrated or empty." He called the book simultaneously a discussion of ethics, of "how political tyranny is established", and of issues in Germany and the "German mentality".

== Contents ==
In 1953 Mayer interviewed ten male residents of "Kronenberg" (in reality Marburg) to understand how ordinary Germans felt about Nazi Germany. The town, located in Hesse with a population of 20,000 and a university, was controlled by the United States during the postwar period of occupation. The interviews occurred during Mayer's term at Frankfurt University's Institute for Social Research as a visiting professor. All ten were in the lower middle class. The author was not a German speaker, and the men did not speak English.

The interviewees had the following occupations: baker, cabinetmaker, bank clerk, bill collector, law enforcement officer, salesperson, student, tailor, and teacher. Walter L. Dorn of the Saturday Review wrote that the interviewees were from a pro-Nazi bloc that was the "anti-labor, anti-capitalist, and anti-democratic lower middle class". The tailor had served a prison sentence for setting a synagogue on fire, but the others were never found to have actively attacked Jewish people. Mayer read the official case files of each interviewee.

The author determined that his interviewees had fond memories of the Nazi period and did not see Adolf Hitler as evil, and they perceived themselves as having a high degree of personal freedom during Nazi rule, except for the teacher. Additionally, barring said teacher, the subjects still disliked Jewish people. Mayer found that he sympathized with the personable qualities of his interviewees, though not their beliefs. Mayer did not disclose to the interviewees that he read their case files, nor that he was Jewish. Ernest S. Pisko of the Christian Science Monitor wrote "Had they known [that Mayer was Jewish] they would not have spoken frankly to him." Pisko concluded that, therefore, the relationship built by the author and the interviewees was on "false pretenses." At the time of the interviews, the interviewees were still not in favor of the democratic Bonn government. Pisko added that the interviewees could have objected to political developments that came had they known they would come, but that they failed to foresee how Nazi rule would develop.

The end of the book describes how the post-World War II United States took a pro-militarization stance, in the context of the Cold War, after initially rejecting the idea of militarizing Germany.

== Release ==
In 2017, the book was re-published with an Afterword by Richard J. Evans. It was only in 2025 that a German edition was published.

== Reception ==
Hans Kohn, a professor at the City College of New York, wrote in his review that this work was "one of the most readable and enlightening" books written about Germany after 1945, when the Nazi government ended. Kohn agreed with the majority of Mayer's analysis of German history, though Kohn disagreed with Mayer's belief that militarism is inherently a problem in Germany.

Henry L. Roberts, writing for Foreign Affairs, described the book as "informal but in places penetrating and sensitive".

Dorn argues that the book is "certainly one-sided" and "pleasantly discursive, not unsympathetic". Dorn explains that the "muscular punch" comes from "scrupulous fairness and unsparing honesty."

Franz Adler of the University of Arkansas praised the "strong appeal" and "conviction" of the book as its "strength", although he criticized the small sample size and the fact that there was a language barrier between Mayer and the subjects. Adler also stated that there was "an abandoned freedom and high disregard for detail" in the translated material, originally from German, in the book.

Norbert Muhlen of New York City, writing for The Annals of the American Academy of Political and Social Science, praised how the author had a distanced, non-passionate view at looking at his subjects, although he criticized the small sample size from a particular rural town, which Muhlen compared to using a sample of people from "Middletown, Mississippi" to characterize the Democratic Party. Muhlen also criticized Mayer's analysis of the Cold War armament of West Germany, arguing that Mayer mischaracterized German newspapers' political stances.

In Books Abroad, Siegfried Wagener of Allenspark, Colorado argued that the book is "very readable and penetrating", though he argued that the interviewees "do not sound convincing" and are not "representative" of the entirety of German people, who Wagener argues "knew they were not free" although they still complied with the Nazi government.

In sum, Pisko stated that the book "is a fascinating story and a deeply moving one." Heckscher argued the book is an "important contribution".

Kurt H. Wolff of The Ohio State University criticized the book for being "representative of the confused subject matter and its confused student."
