= Renaissance 2010 =

Renaissance 2010 was a program of the Chicago Public Schools school district of Chicago, Illinois, United States. Pushed by for-profit education companies, Renaissance 2010 initiative was announced in June 2004 by the Chicago Public Schools and the City of Chicago. Renaissance 2010 called for 100 new schools by 2010. Under Renaissance 2010, the Chicago Public Schools closed over 80 public schools, and sought to create 100 charter schools by 2010. These schools were to be held accountable for test score performance through 5-year contracts while following one of three governance structures: charter, contract, or performance.

== Renaissance 2010 Schools Types ==
There are three different types of Renaissance schools, a charter school, a contract school, and a performance school.

- Charter – Charter Schools are independent public schools. Free from many state laws, district initiatives, and board policies, charter teachers are employees of the nonprofit governing board or an education management organization hired by the board. Charters are operated pursuant to Illinois Charter Law (ILCS 5/27A).
- Contract – Contract Schools are a newly created public school model established as a part of Renaissance 2010. Contracts are managed by independent nonprofit organizations in accordance with Performance Agreements. Contract schoolteachers will be employees of the nonprofit. Contract schools are operated pursuant to Illinois School Code.
- Performance – Performance Schools employ CPS staff and are CPS schools that have freedom from and flexibility on many district initiatives and policies.

== List of Renaissance 2010 Schools ==
Despite legislation that capped Chicago charters at 30, CPS schools chief Arne Duncan and Mayor Daley allowed many new charter schools to open under the auspices of a single charter within the Renaissance 2010 initiative. For example, private charter operator Chicago International was allowed to operate 12 charter schools under its single charter.

=== Contract schools ===
- Austin Business and Entrepreneurship Academy
- Chicago High School for the Arts
- Chicago Academy High School

=== Performance schools ===
- Bronzeville Scholastic Institute (at DuSable)
- Infinity Math, Science, and Technology High School
- Lindblom Math and Science Academy High School
- Multicultural Arts High School (at Little Village)
- Pershing West Middle School (at Douglas)
- Rickover Naval Academy High School (at Senn)
- School of Social Justice (at Little Village)
- Sherman School of Excellence (First Turn-Around School)
- South Shore Fine Arts Academy (in Woodlawn)
- Suder Montessori Elementary School
- Tarkington School of Excellence
- Daniel Hale Williams Preparatory School of Medicine (at DuSable)
- UPLIFT Community School (at Arai)
- World Language High School (at Little Village)

=== Charter schools ===
- Aspira Charter School (at Haugan)
- Bronzeville Lighthouse Charter School
- The Catalyst Schools
- Chicago International Charter School - Avalon/South Shore Campus
- Chicago International Charter School - Ralph Ellison Campus
- Chicago International Charter School -Wrightwood Campus
- Chicago Virtual Charter School
- Choir Academy Charter School of Chicago
- DuSable Leadership Academy of Betty Shabazz International Charter School
- Erie Elementary Charter School
- Galapagos Elementary Charter School
- Legacy Charter School
- Noble Street Charter School - Pritzker College Prep Campus
- Noble Street Charter School - Rauner College Prep Campus
- Noble Street Charter School - Golder College Prep Campus
- Noble Street Charter School - UIC College Prep Campus
- Noble Street Charter School - Gary Comer College Prep Campus
- Noble Street Charter School - Rowe-Clark College Prep Campus
- Noble Street Charter School - Johnson College Prep Campus
- Noble Street Charter School - Bulls College Prep Campus
- Perspectives Charter School – Calumet Campus
- Providence Englewood Charter School - Bunche Campus
- Barbara A. Sizemore Academy of Betty Shabazz International Charter School
- University of Chicago Charter School - Donoghue Campus
- University of Chicago Charter School – Woodlawn High School Campus
- UNO Charter School - Bartolomé de las Casas Campus
- UNO Charter School - Carlos Fuentes Campus
- UNO Charter School - Rufino Tamayo Campus
- Urban Prep Charter Academy for Young Men
- Young Women's Leadership Charter School

== Criticisms ==
In 2005, the Chicago Teachers' Union's president, Marilyn Stewart, was uniformly negative in her assessment of Renaissance 2010, stating that "Chicago's charter schools had scores that were in the basement. [...] All Chicago-based charter schools had scores below the statewide average in third-grade reading, third-grade math, fifth-grade reading and eighth-grade math". A 2009 study by University of Chicago researcher Diane Whitmore Schanzenbach found more mixed results, that "test scores in the Renaissance schools slightly lagged those of students with similar backgrounds who attended neighborhood schools — though not to a statistically significant degree. But results were far from homogeneous, with some Renaissance schools posting decidedly stronger test scores compared to others." Schanzenbach further notes that new schools generally have higher hurdles to face than established ones, and that the best practices used in the Renaissance schools were "on the right track.” Another study released in 2009 by SRI International, a California-based independent research institute, indicated that Renaissance 2010 schools have performed about on par with Chicago Public School-owned schools, with potential for further improvements. Demonstrating the divisive nature of the Renaissance 2010 plan, proponents have used this study to argue that the new schools are solid foundations for better education, while opponents have used this same study to claim that the new schools provide little to no gain for their cost and social disruption.

== See also ==
- Chicago Public Schools
