= Maynard, Minnesota =

City in Minnesota, United States

Maynard
- City
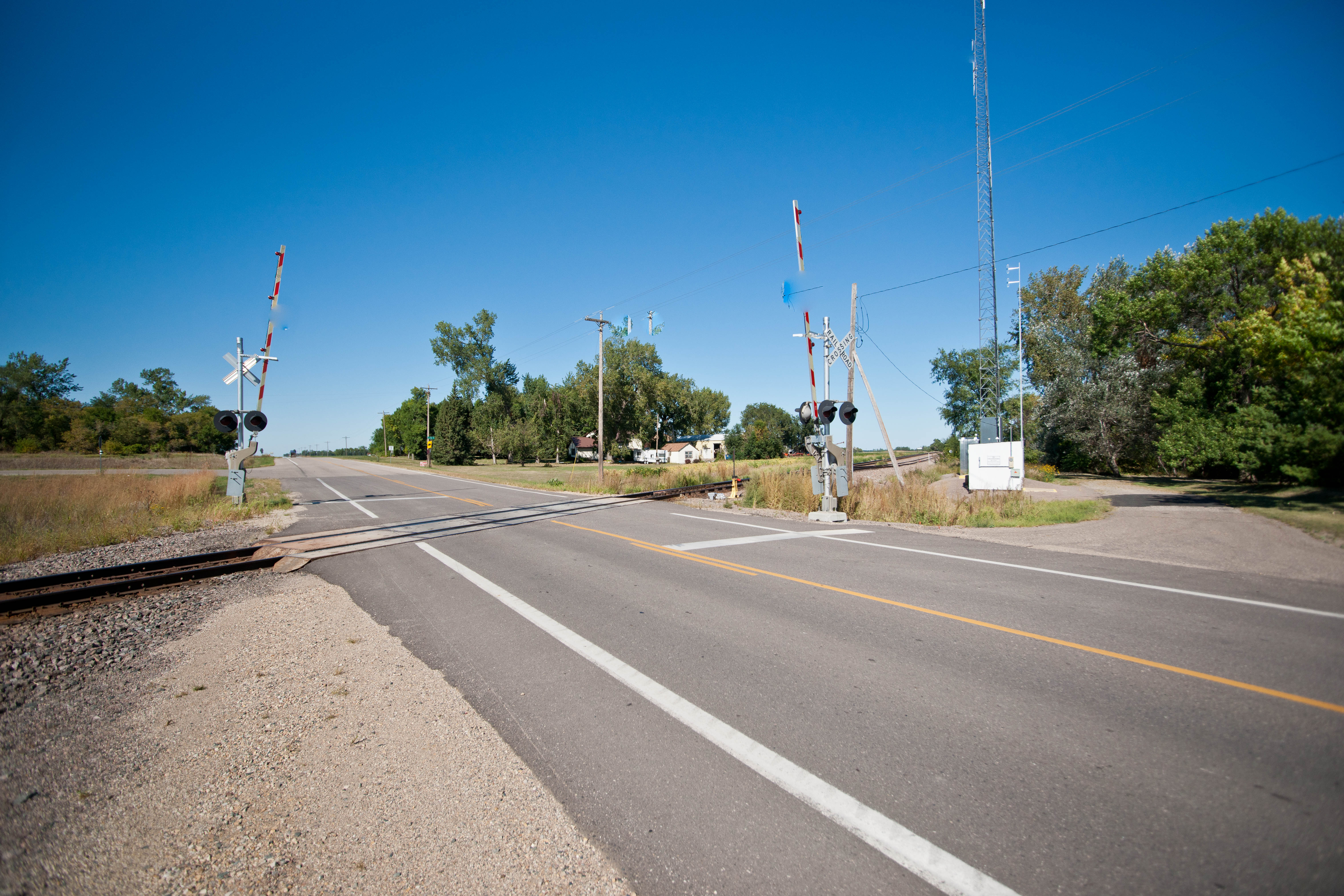
- Railroad crossing at Swift Avenue

- Location of Maynard, Minnesota
- Coordinates: 44°54′21″N 95°28′07″W
- Country: United States
- State: Minnesota
- County: Chippewa

Area
  - Total: 0.60 sq mi (1.55 km^{2})
  - Land: 0.60 sq mi (1.55 km^{2})
  - Water: 0 sq mi (0.00 km^{2})
- Elevation: 1,027 ft (313 m)

Population (2020)
  - Total: 319
  - Density: 532.4/sq mi (205.57/km^{2})
- Time zone: UTC-6 (Central (CST))
  - Summer (DST): UTC-5 (CDT)
- ZIP code: 56260
- Area code: 320
- FIPS code: 27-41210
- GNIS feature ID: 2395052
- Website: https://www.cityofmaynard.com/

Maynard is a city in Chippewa County, Minnesota, United States. As of the 2020 census, Maynard had a population of 319.

== History ==
Maynard was platted in 1887. It was named for the brother-in-law of a railroad official. A post office has been in operation in Maynard since 1889.

== Geography ==
According to the United States Census Bureau, the city has a total area of 0.65 square miles (1.68 km^{2}), all land.

Minnesota State Highway 23 serves as a main route in the community.

== Demographics ==
Historical population
Census	Pop.	Note	%±
1900	245		—
1910	386		57.6%
1920	536		38.9%
1930	504		−6.0%
1940	580		15.1%
1950	507		−12.6%
1960	429		−15.4%
1970	455		6.1%
1980	428		−5.9%
1990	419		−2.1%
2000	388		−7.4%
2010	366		−5.7%
2020	319		−12.8%
U.S. Decennial Census

=== 2010 census ===
As of the census of 2010, there were 366 people, 158 households, and 99 families living in the city. The population density was 563.1 inhabitants per square mile (217.4/km^{2}). There were 175 housing units at an average density of 269.2 per square mile (103.9/km^{2}). The racial makeup of the city was 92.6% White, 1.1% African American, 0.3% Native American, 1.1% Asian, and 4.9% from other races. Hispanic or Latino of any race were 5.5% of the population.

There were 158 households, of which 27.2% had children under the age of 18 living with them, 51.9% were married couples living together, 6.3% had a female householder with no husband present, 4.4% had a male householder with no wife present, and 37.3% were non-families. 32.9% of all households were made up of individuals, and 19% had someone living alone who was 65 years of age or older. The average household size was 2.32 and the average family size was 2.95.

The median age in the city was 43.3 years. 23.5% of residents were under the age of 18; 8.2% were between the ages of 18 and 24; 20.5% were from 25 to 44; 31.8% were from 45 to 64; and 16.1% were 65 years of age or older. The gender makeup of the city was 47.5% male and 52.5% female.

=== 2000 census ===
As of the census of 2000, there were 388 people, 163 households, and 110 families living in the city. The population density was 597.6 inhabitants per square mile (230.7/km^{2}). There were 181 housing units at an average density of 278.8 per square mile (107.6/km^{2}). The racial makeup of the city was 97.68% White, 0.52% Asian, 1.80% from other races. Hispanic or Latino of any race were 1.80% of the population.

There were 163 households, out of which 32.5% had children under the age of 18 living with them, 58.3% were married couples living together, 6.7% had a female householder with no husband present, and 32.5% were non-families. 30.1% of all households were made up of individuals, and 14.1% had someone living alone who was 65 years of age or older. The average household size was 2.38 and the average family size was 2.98.

In the city, the population was spread out, with 26.3% under the age of 18, 6.7% from 18 to 24, 25.8% from 25 to 44, 22.9% from 45 to 64, and 18.3% who were 65 years of age or older. The median age was 40 years. For every 100 females, there were 95.0 males. For every 100 females age 18 and over, there were 97.2 males.

The median income for a household in the city was $28,571, and the median income for a family was $39,583. Males had a median income of $26,250 versus $21,071 for females. The per capita income for the city was $14,285. About 6.4% of families and 7.8% of the population were below the poverty line, including 2.3% of those under age 18 and 8.2% of those age 65 or over.
