= Shellie McMillon =

American basketball player (1936–1980)

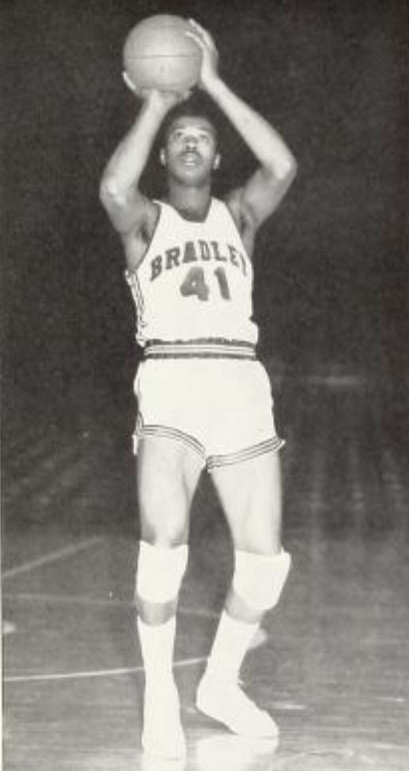
- McMillon from the Anaga, 1958.

Personal information
- Born: March 11, 1936 Chicago, Illinois
- Died: July 11, 1980 (aged 44) Chicago, Illinois, U.S.
- Listed height: 6 ft 5 in (1.96 m)
- Listed weight: 205 lb (93 kg)

Career information
- High school: DuSable (Chicago, Illinois)
- College: Bradley (1954–1958)
- NBA draft: 1958: 6th round, 42nd overall pick
- Drafted by: Detroit Pistons
- Playing career: 1958–1962
- Position: Power forward / small forward
- Number: 6, 25

Career history
- 1958–1961: Detroit Pistons
- 1961–1962: St. Louis Hawks

Career NBA statistics
- Points: 2,397 (9.1 ppg)
- Rebounds: 1,571 (6.0 rpg)
- Assists: 232 (0.9 apg)
- Stats at NBA.com
- Stats at Basketball Reference

Shellie McMillon Jr. (March 11, 1936 – July 11, 1980) was an American professional basketball player.

== Biography ==
McMillon was selected in the 1958 NBA draft by the Detroit Pistons after a collegiate career at Bradley University. He played for the Pistons and St. Louis Hawks during his four-year NBA career. Although their surnames are spelled differently, McMillon was the older brother of Ernie McMillan, who played 15 seasons with the NFL's St. Louis Cardinals. Ernie's son Erik McMillan was a defensive back for the New York Jets. Shellie McMillon was one of the stars of a DuSable High School team from Chicago that won back-to-back Chicago Public League championships and in 1954 became the first team with black players and a black coach to play in the Illinois state championship game. On July 11, 1980, McMillon was found dead in his bed by his mother.

== Career statistics ==
Legend
GP	Games played	GS	Games started	MPG	Minutes per game
FG%	Field goal percentage	3P%	3-point field goal percentage	FT%	Free throw percentage
RPG	Rebounds per game	APG	Assists per game	SPG	Steals per game
BPG	Blocks per game	PPG	Points per game	**Bold**	Career high

=== NBA ===
==== Regular season ====
Year	Team	GP	MPG	FG%	FT%	RPG	APG	PPG
1958–59	Detroit	48	14.6	.439	.529	5.9	.5	6.4
1959–60	Detroit	75	18.9	.426	.663	5.7	.7	8.9
1960–61	Detroit	**78**	21.0	.428	**.697**	6.2	**1.3**	10.1
1961–62	Detroit	14	13.6	.313	.556	4.6	.4	5.1
1961–62	St. Louis	48	**21.6**	**.470**	.603	**6.3**	1.1	**11.8**
Career		263	18.9	.434	.634	6.0	.9	9.1

==== Playoffs ====
Year	Team	GP	MPG	FG%	FT%	RPG	APG	PPG
1959	Detroit	3	18.0	.3504	**.833**	4.7	.0	6.3
1960	Detroit	2	**23.5**	.381	.800	**8.0**	1.0	**10.0**
1961	Detroit	**4**	16.8	**.481**	.722	2.3	1.8	9.8
Career		9	18.7	.394	.759	4.3	1.0	8.7
