= Milwaukee Badgers =

American football team, based in Milwaukee, Wisconsin

General information
- Founded: 1922
- Folded: 1926
- Stadium: Athletic Park
- Headquartered: Milwaukee, Wisconsin, United States
- Colors: Orange, White (1922–1925) Red, White (1926)

Personnel
- Owners: Ambrose McGuirk (1922–1925); Johnny Bryan (1926)
- Head coach: Budge Garrett (1922); Jimmy Conzelman (1922–23); Hal Erickson (1924); Johnny Bryan (1925–26)

League / conference affiliations
- National Football League

The Milwaukee Badgers were a professional American football team, based in Milwaukee, that played in the National Football League from 1922 to 1926. The team played its home games at Athletic Park, later known as Borchert Field, on Milwaukee's north side. The team was notable for having many African-American players for the time.

After the team folded following the 1926 season (largely due to being left broke because of a $500 fine by the NFL for using four high school players in a 1925 game against the Chicago Cardinals, a game arranged after the Badgers had disbanded for the season), many of its members played for the independent semi-pro Milwaukee Eagles. Some of the players from this team went on to play for the NFL's Pittsburgh Pirates in 1933. This has led some to mistakenly believe that either the Badgers or Eagles became the Pittsburgh Steelers.

The Milwaukee market is now claimed by the Green Bay Packers, who played three or four regular season games there from 1933 to 1994, including the 1939 NFL Championship Game. The Packers still reserve two games a season for their old Milwaukee season ticket holders, and have their flagship radio station, WRNW, there as well.

== History ==
=== Origins ===
The Milwaukee Badgers were founded by two Chicago sporting promoters, Joe Plunkett and Ambrose McGuirk. The pair saw the city as a great prospect for a professional football club. In order to create a team that could compete immediately in the early National Football League, the men scoured the East Coast college ranks, signing multiple All-Americans in hopes of building a team of all-stars that could rival the Green Bay Packers for state supremacy. The team's first major signing was Fritz Pollard, who had been a player-coach the previous year for the Akron Pros. Pollard was also the first black man to coach whites in American professional sports. Two other African Americans played for the Badgers in 1922, Paul Robeson and Duke Slater.

=== First years ===
The Badgers played their first home game on October 15, 1922, in which they defeated the Racine Legion 20–0 in front of 6,000 fans at Athletic Park. However, injuries and team disunity caught up with the Badgers, as they finished the season with just two wins, four defeats and three ties, resulting in 11th place in the standings.

The next season, the Badgers fielded an all-white team, ending their brief experiment with integration. The 1923 season would be the high point in the franchise's short history, as they placed third in the league with a 7-2-3 record. Both of the Badgers' losses that season came from the Packers, who kept them a distant second in popularity among Wisconsin's professional football fans. Even worse the Badgers struggled to even outdraw local semi-professional and factory teams. Games between those squads could draw as many as 9,000 spectators, while the Badgers rarely attracted around 4,500. In 1924, the Badgers went 5–8, before losing all six of their games in 1925 and being outscored 191–7. Milwaukee citizens held so little interest in the club that the team played just one home game.

While interest in the Badgers dwindled at home, several interested parties within the Chicago Cardinals began to take notice of them.

==== 1925 high school players scandal ====
In 1925, the Chicago Cardinals were in need of two easy wins to help keep up with the Pottsville Maroons and stay in the hunt of the 1925 NFL Championship. As a result, the Cardinals planned two extra games that were scheduled against the Badgers and the Hammond Pros, who were both losing teams in that season. The Pros and the Badgers were both NFL teams, but had ended their seasons. The Badgers, owned by Ambrose McGuirk, agreed to a game against the Cardinals. However, McGuirk lived in Chicago, and had a tough time putting a team together to play the Cardinals. So Art Folz, a substitute quarterback for the Cardinals, convinced four players from Chicago's Englewood High School into joining the Badgers for the game under assumed names, thereby ensuring that the Cardinals' opponent was not a pro caliber club. The high schoolers were reported to be William Thompson, Jack Daniels, Charles Richardson and Jimmy Snyder.

However NFL President Joseph Carr later learned that high school players had been used in an NFL game. He then stated that the 58-0 Cardinals win would be stricken from the record. However, the league had never got around to removing it. The game is still a part of the NFL records. Cardinals' owner Chris O'Brien was also fined $1,000 by Carr for allowing his team play the game. Meanwhile, McGuirk was ordered to sell his Milwaukee franchise within 90 days. Folz, for his role, was barred from football for life. However, by 1926, Carr toned down his punishment for each party involved in the scandal. Folz's lifetime ban was lifted, probably to prevent him from going to the first American Football League; however he chose not to return to pro football. The $1,000 fine against O'Brien was rescinded, probably since the amount would have put the Cardinals out of business. Before Carr could rescind the fine given to McGuirk, he had already sold his Badgers franchise to Johnny Bryan, a fullback with the Chicago Bears. The Englewood players were also forgiven, and two of them, William Thompson and Charles Richardson, earned high school all-star recognition at the end of the season. Folz reportedly told the high schoolers that the game was a "practice game" and would in no part affect their amateur status.

This game would also be used to state that the Pottsville Maroons should have won the 1925 NFL Championship.

=== Decline ===
Bryan took an aggressive approach to rebuilding the team, even ditching the club's familiar orange sweaters for bright red. While a 2–2 start gave the team hope, but they dropped the last five games of the season and folded the following summer due to a lack of money. In ten games against the rival Packers, the Badgers were winless, managing only a scoreless tie in their first meeting.

== Players ==
=== Pro Football Hall of Famers ===
Milwaukee Badgers Hall of Famers
Players
No.	Name	Position	Tenure	Inducted
—	Jimmy Conzelman	HB/QB	1922–1924	1964
—	Johnny Blood	HB	1925–1926	1963
—	Fritz Pollard	HB	1922	2005
—	Duke Slater	OT	1922	2020

=== Other players ===
LaVern Dilweg
Frank Morrissey
Paul Robeson
Roy Vassau
Johnny Heimsch

== Season records ==
Year	W	L	T	Finish	Coach
1922	2	4	3	11th	Jimmy Conzelman, Budge Garrett
1923	7	2	3	3rd	Jimmy Conzelman
1924	5	8	0	12th	Hal Erickson
1925	0	6	0	16th	Johnny Bryan
1926	2	7	0	15th	Johnny Bryan
