= Joseph Carr =

American football executive, and owner (1879–1939)

Joe Carr
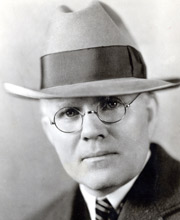

Profile
- Position: Head coach

Personal information
- Born: October 22, 1879; Columbus, Ohio, U.S.
- Died: May 20, 1939 (aged 59); Columbus, Ohio, U.S.

Career history

Coaching
- Columbus Panhandles (1901–1904, 1907–1918)

Operations
- Columbus Panhandles (1907–1922) Owner/general manager; NFL Commissioner (1921–1939); American Basketball League (1925–1927) President; Columbus Senators (1926–1931) President

Awards and highlights
- Helms Pro Football Hall of Fame (1950)
- Pro Football Hall of Fame

Joseph Francis Carr (October 22, 1879 – May 20, 1939) was an American sports executive in football, baseball, and basketball. He is best known as the president of the National Football League from 1921 until 1939. He was also one of the founders and president of the American Basketball League (ABL) from 1925 to 1927. He was also the promotional director for Minor League Baseball's governing body from 1933 to 1939, leading an expansion of the minor leagues from 12 to 40 leagues operating in 279 cities with 4,200 players and attendance totaling 15,500,000.

A native and lifelong resident of Columbus, Ohio, Carr worked in his early years as a machinist for the Panhandle Division of the Pennsylvania Railroad and a sports writer for a Columbus newspaper. While working for the Panhandle Division, he founded the Famous Panhandle White Sox baseball team in approximately 1900. He also revived the Columbus Panhandles football team in 1907, manning the team with railroad employees. The Panhandles became one of the inaugural members of the American Professional Football Association (APFA), which was renamed the National Football League (NFL) in 1922.

From 1921 until his death in 1939, Carr served as president of the NFL. He oversaw the growth of the league from its origins, principally in small or medium-sized cities in Ohio, Indiana, and Illinois into a national league with teams in major cities. During his tenure, many of the NFL's premier franchises were established, including the New York Giants, Pittsburgh Steelers, Philadelphia Eagles, Detroit Lions and Washington Redskins. Called the "Father of Professional Football", Carr was one of the 17 inaugural inductees into the Pro Football Hall of Fame in 1963.

== Early life ==
Carr was born Joseph Francis Karr on October 23, 1879, at his parents' home in the Irish neighborhood on the East End of Columbus, Ohio. His father, Michael Karr, was a shoemaker who was born in Ireland in 1841 and immigrated to the United States in 1864. His mother Margaret Karr was born in New York to Irish immigrant parents. Carr had five older siblings, Bridget, James, John, Mary, and Michael, and a younger brother, Edward. In the late 1880s, Carr's father became a sewer contractor, and in 1898 his mother died at age 58. At some point prior to the 1900 Census, the family changed its name to "Carr".

Carr was educated at St. Patrick School and later St. Dominic's School, both in Columbus. He left school at age 16 and became employed as a machinist. By 1899, Carr was working as a machinist for the Panhandle Division of the Pennsylvania Railroad. In approximately 1900, Carr was also hired as an assistant sports editor and sports writer for the Ohio State Journal, one of the three major newspapers in Columbus at the time. He wrote about all sports, but his boxing stories were especially popular. While working for the newspaper, he continued to also work as a machinist for the railroad.

== Columbus Panhandles ==
In 1900, Carr organized a baseball team made up of employees of the railroad's Panhandle Division. The team, known as the Famous Panhandle White Sox, played in the Capital City League and the Saturday Afternoon League in Columbus for several years. According to the Chicago Tribune, Carr's Panhandle club "gained a reputation in semi-professional ranks throughout the country."

In 1907, Carr began a long association with the sport of football. He obtained permission from the Panhandle Athletic Club to reorganize the Columbus Panhandles football team, a team that had been formed in 1900 or 1901 and disbanded in 1904. He secured players from the railroad shop where he worked. The core of Carr's Panhandles teams were six Nesser brothers who worked at the shop and were excellent athletes. To save on expenses, the players, who were railroad employees, used their passes to ride the train for free and practiced during the lunch hour on the railroad yards. Over the next 13 years, the Panhandles became known as a traveling team, as Carr saved money on travel expenses and stadium rental by playing mostly road games. In 1921, the Fort Wayne Journal called the Panhandles the "most renowned professional football aggregation in the country."

Carr also continued his association with professional baseball while running the Panhandles, serving for several years as the secretary/treasurer and later president of the Ohio State League, a minor league baseball circuit.

As early as 1917, Carr was one of the leading advocates of a plan to develop a national professional football league. Sources are not in agreement as to what role, if any, he played in the formation of the American Professional Football Association (APFA), which later became the National Football League (NFL). However, once the APFA was formed in 1920, Carr's Panhandles played in the league's inaugural season. The 1920 Panhandles team played only one home game and compiled a 2–7–2 record.

== NFL presidency ==
At the annual meeting of the APFA held in Akron, Ohio, on April 30, 1921, Carr was elected as the organization's president. He was re-elected president in January 1922, and he held that position for 18 years until his death in 1939.

Carr moved the APFA's headquarters to Columbus, drafted a league constitution and by-laws, gave teams territorial rights, developed membership criteria for the franchises, and issued standings for the first time, so that the APFA would have a clear champion. Carr also began cleaning up other problems. By 1925, he introduced a standard player's contract, fashioned after the ones being used in pro baseball, so players couldn't jump from one team to another. Carr also declared that players under contract from the previous season could not be approached by another team unless first declared a free agent, thus introducing the reserve clause to professional football.

=== Ban on use of college players ===
In the early 20th century, college football was the dominant version of the sport, and professional teams would sometimes pay college players to play for them, often under assumed names. The practice was considered questionable ethically, resulting in taint being associated with the professional game. In order to remove the taint, and to engender peaceful relations with the college game, Carr made it one of his first goals as league president to impose a strict ban of the use of college football players. Indeed, at the same meeting at which Carr was elected president, the APFA adopted a rule prohibiting teams from using players who had not completed their college course.

Carr enforced the ban with vigor. During the 1921 APFA season, two or three college players from Notre Dame played for the Green Bay Acme Packers under assumed names. The incident resulted in the players losing their amateur status and being barred from further college football participation. In January 1922, Carr responded with the severest possible action, kicking the Packers out of the APFA. A few months later, a group headed by future Hall of Famer Curly Lambeau applied for and was granted the Green Bay franchise.

The 1925 Chicago Cardinals-Milwaukee Badgers scandal followed four years later. In December 1925, four high school students played for the Milwaukee Badgers in a game against the Chicago Cardinals. Carr responded by imposing stiff penalties. The Milwaukee club was fined $500 and given 90 days within which to "dispose of all its club assets at which time the management must retire from the league." The Cardinals were fined $1,000 for their prior knowledge of the violation, and Cardinal player Art Foltz was temporarily banned from the league for life for having "induced the boys to play".

The issue arose again when Red Grange, star halfback of the University of Illinois football team, signed with the Chicago Bears. Grange played his final college game on November 21, signed with the Bears the next day, and appeared in his first professional game on November 26. Two weeks later, Ernie Nevers signed a professional football contract for $50,000. To help ease tensions and promote the professional game in the college circles, Carr established a rule prohibiting college players to sign with professional teams until after their class had graduated.

=== Expansion of the APFA into a "national" league ===
Carr faced numerous challenges as the league's president. One of the principal challenges was expanding the league to a national scope. In 1920, 11 of the league's 14 teams were located in Ohio, Indiana, and Illinois, including franchises in small cities such as Akron, Decatur, Rock Island, Canton, Hammond and Muncie. Carr believed that the league needed to model itself after Major League Baseball with teams in the country's largest cities. In 1922, the APFA changed its name to the National Football League, reflecting Carr's goal of building a professional football league that was national in scope.

Another challenge was fostering stability in the league's membership. In 1921, the APFA had 21 teams. Through the 1920s, NFL franchises were constantly setting up and then folding. From 1920 through 1932, 19 teams lasted one year and 11 teams lasted two years. During his tenure as league president, Carr sought to recruit financially capable owners to operate teams in the nation's largest cities. He oversaw the establishment of successful teams in the nation's largest cities, including the following:

- In January 1922, George Halas was granted a franchise to operate the Chicago Bears at Cubs Park. Halas took over the franchise previously known as the Decatur Staleys, which under Halas' leadership had won the APFA championship and begun paying its home games in Chicago in October 1921. Halas acquired ownership of the club from A. E. Staley and remained the owner of the Bears until his death in 1983.
- In 1925, and after rejecting applications submitted by numerous candidates seeking to operate a franchise in New York City, Carr recruited Tim Mara to start a club in New York City known as the New York Giants. The Mara family became one of the leading families in the NFL over the next 80 years, as both Tim Mara and his son, Wellington Mara, having been inducted into the Pro Football Hall of Fame.
- In 1930, he moved the Dayton Triangles to Brooklyn as the Brooklyn Dodgers. The Brooklyn team remained with the NFL through the 1944 season.
- In 1932, Carr oversaw the founding of the Boston Redskins under the ownership of George Preston Marshall. He also oversaw the move of the Redskins to Washington, D.C., in 1937.
- In 1933, he added the Philadelphia Eagles to the NFL with Bert Bell as owner. Bell would later follow Carr as NFL president.
- Also in 1933, Carr added Pittsburgh Steelers (originally called the Pirates) under the ownership of Art Rooney. As a testament to Carr's pursuit of stable ownership, the Rooney family continues to own the Steelers.
- In 1934, he oversaw the move of the Portsmouth Spartans to Detroit, where they were renamed the Detroit Lions.
- In 1937, the Cleveland Rams joined the NFL. (The Rams moved to Los Angeles nine years later.)

At the same time, many of the teams in smaller cities either moved or were dissolved altogether. One of the casualties was Carr's original team, the Panhandles. They were renamed the Tigers in 1923, and played for four more seasons before dissolving after the 1926 season.

By 1937, the National Football League had reduced its membership to ten teams with nine of the ten teams located in major cities that also had Major League Baseball teams. Only Green Bay, Wisconsin, lacked a major league baseball team. By placing teams in big cities, Carr gave the NFL gained the foundation of stability it needed to survive during the Great Depression.

=== 1925 NFL championship controversy ===
In 1925, the Pottsville Maroons, a first year NFL team, played an exhibition game against a team of former Notre Dame stars including the famous "Four Horsemen". The game was played at Philadelphia's Shibe Park, which was within the protected territory of the Frankford Yellow Jackets, who were playing a league game just a few miles away at Legion Field. On three occasions prior to the game, Carr reportedly warned the Pottsville management not to play the game, "under all penalties that the league could inflict". Ignoring Carr's warnings, the game went on as scheduled. However, the Maroons stated that Carr knew of the game and had allowed it to take place. For this act, the Pottsville Maroons were fined $500 and had their franchise forfeited; as a result, the team was stripped of their NFL title, which was given to the Chicago Cardinals. However Carr's decision and handling of the situation is still being protested by many sports historians, as well as by the people of Pottsville, Pennsylvania, and controversy still lingers about who actually won the 1925 NFL Championship, since the Maroons had earlier beaten Chicago and were actually awarded the league championship before they were suspended.

== American Basketball League ==
In 1925, Carr was one of the moving forces behind the formation of the American Basketball League (ABL), the first attempt to create a major professional basketball league in the United States. At the ABL's organizational meeting, held in Cleveland in April 1925, Carr was elected as the ABL's president and secretary. In three years as the league's president, he helped establish clubs in Brooklyn, Boston, Philadelphia, Washington, Rochester, Cleveland, Fort Wayne and Chicago, and negotiated with the operators of the Philadelphia Arena and Madison Square Garden to install professional basketball teams in those facilities.

== Minor League Baseball ==
Carr returned to professional baseball in 1926 as president of the Columbus Senators, a minor league club playing in the American Association. He remained president of the Senators until early 1931, when the club was sold to the St. Louis Cardinals, and Carr was replaced by future National Baseball Hall of Fame inductee Larry MacPhail.

In January 1933, Carr was hired as the promotional director for the National Association of Professional Baseball Leagues, the governing body for Minor League Baseball. He was also given a seat on the organization's executive committee and charged with developing "a program to rehabilitate minor league baseball." In 1931, prior to Carr taking over, there were 12 minor leagues, and many of them were in serious financial trouble. By 1939, Carr had overseen the expansion of Minor League Baseball to 40 leagues operating in 279 cities in 40 states employing 4,200 players and drawing an attendance in 1938 totaling 15,500,000.

== Family and later years ==
Carr married Josephine Marie Sullivan on June 27, 1911, at St. Dominic's Church in Columbus, Ohio. They had two children, Mary Agnes, (born October 13, 1913) and Joseph Francis Jr. (born October 1, 1915).

In February 1939, Carr was unanimously reelected as president of the NFL, this time for a 10-year term. Carr reported at the time that the NFL attendance in 1938 had increased by 14% to 937,167 in 25 league games. Three months after his reelection, on May 20, 1939, Carr suffered a heart attack and was taken to a Columbus hospital where he died several hours later. Carr had a prior heart attack in September 1937, resulting in a hospitalization lasting several weeks.

Carr's funeral was held at Holy Rosary Church in Columbus and was attended by leaders of the NFL. He is buried at Saint Joseph Cemetery in Lockbourne, Ohio.

== Legacy ==
Following Carr's death, Chicago Bears owner George Halas paid tribute to Carr's steadying influence and said:

Professional football's remarkable growth and popularity today is not the result of the efforts of any one owner or group of owners. It is due entirely to Mr. Carr's fair and impartial administration of its affairs and his steadfast belief in the game.

In June 1939, Halas proposed that the NFL's most valuable player award, which had been approved by the league's directors at their annual winter meeting, be named the Joe F. Carr Memorial Trophy. Halas' proposal was adopted by the NFL the following month.

The NFL Most Valuable Player Award was named for Carr starting in 1939 and continuing through the 1946 season, after which it was discontinued. The Touchdown Club of Columbus also presented a Joe F. Carr Trophy to the NFL Player of the Year annually from 1955 to 1978.

In 1950, the Helms Athletic Foundation established the Paul H. Helms Pro Football Hall of Fame (not to be confused with the Pro Football Hall of Fame established in 1962). Carr was one of the inaugural inductees into the Helms Pro Football Hall of Fame.

In July 1962, a board was established to select up to 20 individuals as the inaugural inductees into the newly established Pro Football Hall of Fame. The sport editor of The Pittsburgh Press at the time predicted: "Its first choice could well be Joe Carr, the little man from Columbus, O., whose retiring nature was matched by his fiery belief in the future of professional football. Mr. Carr was the NFL's first president, a position he held until his death, and much of the league's success can be traced back to the solid foundation he laid."

In January 1963, the inaugural group of inductees was announced with Carr being one of "the first 17 immortals" to be voted into the Pro Football Hall of Fame. He was one of six officials selected "for helping to guide the pro sport from its original role as a stepchild of the college game to its modern popularity". He was described in a biographical portrait released by the Hall as the "Father of Professional Football" for his organizational work in the early days of professional football. Other inaugural inductees included George Halas, Red Grange, Jim Thorpe, Bronko Nagurski, Curly Lambeau, and Bert Bell.

In 1979, George Halas wrote that professional football in its infancy needed a man who could direct the development of our organization, help design rules and enforce them." In Halas' view, Carr was that man: "He was a born organizer."

In 2010, football historian Chris Willis published a biography of Carr titled, "The Man Who Built the National Football League: Joe F. Carr".
