= Paddy Driscoll =

American football and baseball player (1895–1968)

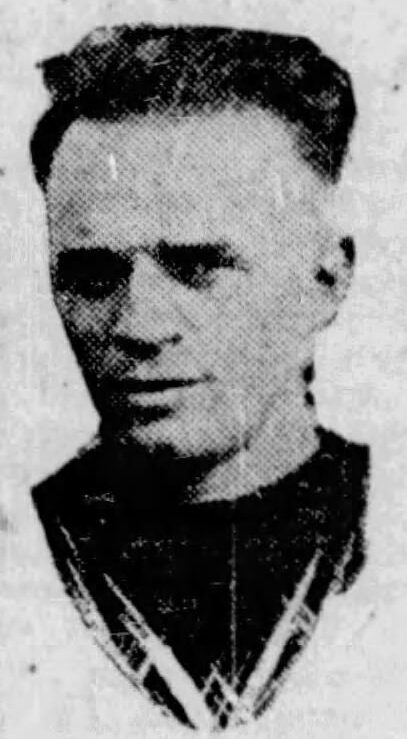
- Driscoll c. 1926
- Born: John Leo Paddy Driscoll; January 11, 1895; Evanston, Illinois, U.S.
- Died: June 29, 1968 (aged 73); Chicago, Illinois, U.S.
- Football career

No. 20, 1, 2, 26
- Positions: Quarterback, halfback, drop kicker

Personal information
- Listed height: 5 ft 11 in (1.80 m)
- Listed weight: 160 lb (73 kg)

Career information
- High school: Evanston
- College: Northwestern (1915–1916); Great Lakes Navy (1918)

Career history

Playing
- Hammond All-Stars (1917); Hammond Pros (1919); Racine / Chicago Cardinals (1920–1925); Chicago Bears (1926–1929)

Coaching
- Chicago Cardinals (1920–1922) Head coach; Marquette (1937–1940) Head coach; Chicago Bears (1941–1955) Assistant coach; Chicago Bears (1956–1957) Head coach

Operations
- Chicago Bears (1958–1962) Vice President; Chicago Bears (1963–1968) Director of planning and research

Awards and highlights
- NFL champion (1925); 6× First-team All-Pro (1920, 1922, 1923, 1925–1927); 2× Second-team All-Pro (1924, 1928); NFL 1920s All-Decade Team; Arizona Cardinals Ring of Honor; 100 greatest Bears of All-Time; Third-team All-American (1916); First-team All-Western (1916)

Career statistics
- Passing touchdowns: 18
- Rushing touchdowns: 25
- Receiving touchdowns: 4
- Points scored: 402
- Stats at Pro Football Reference

Head coaching record
- Regular season: NFL: 31–17–5 (.632)
- Postseason: NFL: 0–1 (.000)
- Career: NFL: 31–18–5 (.620); College: 10–23–1 (.309)
- Coaching profile at Pro Football Reference
- Pro Football Hall of Fame
- College Football Hall of Fame
- Baseball career
- Infielder
- Batted: Right Threw: Right

MLB debut
- June 12, 1917, for the Chicago Cubs

Last MLB appearance
- August 12, 1917, for the Chicago Cubs

MLB statistics
- Batting average: .107
- RBI: 3
- Stats at Baseball Reference

Teams
- Chicago Cubs (1917)

John Leo "Paddy" Driscoll (January 11, 1895 – June 29, 1968) was an American professional football and baseball player and football coach. A triple-threat man in football, he was regarded as the best drop kicker and one of the best overall players in the early years of the National Football League (NFL). He was inducted into the Pro Football Hall of Fame in 1965 and the College Football Hall of Fame in 1974.

Driscoll played college football as a quarterback and halfback for the Northwestern football team in 1915 and 1916. In 1917, he played Major League Baseball as an infielder for the Chicago Cubs. He joined the United States Navy during World War I and played for the undefeated 1918 Great Lakes Navy Bluejackets football team that won the 1919 Rose Bowl.

Driscoll played professional football as a quarterback and halfback for the Hammond All-Stars (1917), Hammond Pros (1919), Racine/Chicago Cardinals (1920–1925), and Chicago Bears (1926–1929). He was the NFL's first All-Pro quarterback and its leading scorer in 1923 and 1926. He also led the 1925 Chicago Cardinals to an alleged NFL championship and was selected in 1969 for the NFL 1920s All-Decade Team.

Driscoll also worked for many years as a football coach. He was the head coach of Chicago Cardinals from 1920 to 1922 and at Marquette from 1937 to 1940. He spent the last 28 years of his life with the Chicago Bears as an assistant coach (1941–1955), head coach (1956–1957), and later as the director of the Bears research and planning unit.

== Early years and Northwestern ==
Driscoll was born in Evanston, Illinois, in 1895. His father, Timothy Driscoll, was an Irish immigrant who worked as a stone cutter. His mother, Elizabeth, was born in Wisconsin to Irish parents. He attended Evanston Township High School.

Driscoll enrolled at Northwestern University in 1914. He played for the Northwestern football team in 1915 and 1916 and became a member of the Sigma Alpha Epsilon fraternity. In 1916, Driscoll led the team to a 6–1 record and a second-place finish in the Western Conference. On October 21, 1916, Driscoll, who at the time weighed only 143 pounds, scored nine points on a touchdown and a field goal in a 10–0 victory over Chicago, Northwestern's first victory in 15 years over the Maroons. In 1916, he was selected as a first-team halfback on the 1916 All-Western Conference football team. He was also selected as a second-team All-American by the United Press and a third-team All-American by Walter Camp.

Driscoll also played for Northwestern's basketball and baseball teams. In December 1916, he was reportedly declared ineligible by Northwestern faculty investigating his standing.

== Playing career ==
=== Chicago Cubs ===
During the summer of 1917, Driscoll played in Major League Baseball for the Chicago Cubs. He made his debut on June 12 and appeared in 13 games, 8 of them as a third baseman, for the Cubs. In 32 plate appearances, he compiled a .107 batting average with a double, three runs batted in, two bases on balls, and two stolen bases.

=== Hammond Clabbys ===
Driscoll made his professional football debut in 1917 with the Hammond Clabbys. He led the team to the professional championship of Indiana and quickly became a star. Driscoll's 1917 season highlights including the following:

- On October 28, 1917, Driscoll scored all 20 Hammond points (three touchdowns and two extra points) in a 20–0 victory over Wabash. Driscoll's three touchdowns included a kickoff return in the third quarter.
- On November 4, 1917, before a crowd of 5,000, Driscoll scored all 13 Hammond points (two field goals, a touchdown, and an extra point) in a 13–0 victory over Pine Village. The result was only the second loss for Pine Village in 12 years.
- On November 11, 1917, Driscoll was knocked unconscious in the third quarter of a 13–3 victory over the Cornell Hamburgs. He returned to the game later in the quarter and drop-kicked a 55-yard field goal from beyond midfield.
- On December 2, 1917, Driscoll led Hammond to a 25–0 victory over the Fort Wayne Friars. Driscoll scored three touchdowns and kicked an extra point in the game.

At the end of the 1917 season, Driscoll was selected by Indiana sports writer Heze Clark as the quarterback on the 1917 All-Pro Team.

=== Great Lakes Navy ===
In March 1918, Driscoll enlisted in the United States Navy during World War I and was given the rank of petty officer. He was assigned to Naval Station Great Lakes and played for the Great Lakes Navy Bluejackets football team in the fall of 1918. Driscoll's teammates on the 1918 Great Lakes team included George Halas, with whom Driscoll formed a lifelong friendship, and Jimmy Conzelman, all three of whom were later inducted into the Pro Football Hall of Fame. Due to protests from some opponents over Driscoll's professional status, he was not allowed to play in a number of early games. On November 16, 1918, Driscoll scored six touchdowns, including an 80-yard run, and kicked five extra points in the Naval Station's 54–14 victory over a Rutgers team starring Paul Robeson.

The 1918 Great Lakes football team compiled a 6–0–2 record and defeated the Mare Island Marines by a 17–0 score in the 1919 Rose Bowl. In the Rose Bowl, he drop-kicked a field goal and threw a touchdown pass to George Halas. After the game, the Los Angeles Times wrote: "Driscoll needs no praise. He is the greatest back-field star we have ever seen in Southern California and had at his command as fine a team of football players as any player could ask."

=== Los Angeles Angels ===
Driscoll returned to professional baseball in 1919. In February 1919, weeks after his starring performance in the Rose Bowl, he was traded by the Cubs to the Los Angeles Angels of the Pacific Coast League. The Angels planned to play Driscoll at shortstop, and the Los Angeles Times opined: "If he can dash around the diamond like he does across the tanbark there won't be a whole lot for the remainder of the Angel infield to do." He appeared in 39 games for the Angels and compiled a .264 batting average and .380 slugging percentage with three doubles, four triples, and a home run.

=== Hammond All-Stars ===
In the fall of 1919, Driscoll and George Halas (along with Paul Des Jardien and Bert Baston) played for the Hammond All-Stars, which became one of the founding teams in the National Football League one year later. On November 23, 1919, Driscoll led Hammond to a 33–0 victory over Toledo at Wrigley Field. He drop-kicked a field goal from the 35-yard line, returned a punt 50 yards for a touchdown, and kicked three extra points. Four days later, Hammond lost to the Canton Bulldogs who won the professional championship; Driscoll's fumble of the opening kickoff set up a touchdown run by Jim Thorpe for the game's only scoring.

=== Racine/Chicago Cardinals ===
==== 1920 season ====
In September 1920, Driscoll signed to play with and captain the Racine Cardinals (so named because the team's home field, Normal Park, was located on Racine Avenue in Chicago) in the newly formed American Professional Football Association (later renamed the National Football League). The 1920 season is recognized as the inaugural season of the NFL. Highlights of Driscoll's 1920 season include:

- On October 17, 1920, "long runs" by Driscoll led the Cardinals to a 33–3 victory over the Moline Universal Tractors.
- On October 31, 1920, the Cardinals defeated the Detroit Heralds, the club's first victory over an APFA opponent. The Detroit Free Press reported: "Driscoll kicked all three goals and had the Heralds in their own territory most of the time with his long kicks and passes."
- On November 7, 1920, Driscoll returned a punt for the winning touchdown in a 6–3 victory over the Chicago Tigers before a crowd of 7,000 spectators at Wrigley Field.
- On November 14, 1920, Driscoll scored a touchdown and kicked three extra points as the Cardinals defeated the Cincinnati Celts, 20–0.
- On November 21, 1920, Driscoll scored a touchdown and kicked two extra points in a 14–0 victory over the Lansing Oldsmobile team. The Lansing State Journal noted that Driscoll appeared "unimpressive" in his uniform but proved to be the "luminous" star of the game who was "always on the move and as elusive as the well known rabbit."
- On November 29, 1920, the Cardinals defeated the heavily favored Decatur Staleys, 7–6, giving the Staleys their first loss of the season. According to the Chicago Tribune, Driscoll kicked the extra point that was the margin of victory and was "the big star of the game."
- On December 19, 1920, the Cardinals played the semipro Chicago Stayms (who were reinforced for the occasion by four Decatur Staleys' players, including George Halas) to a 14–14 tie at Pyott Field. According to the Chicago Tribune, "McInerney and Driscoll were the whole show for the Cardinals, Driscoll giving his usual clever exhibition of open field running."

The Cardinals finished the 1920 season with a 7–2–2, good for fourth place out of 14 teams in the NFL's inaugural season. Driscoll was selected as the first-team quarterback on the 1920 All-Pro Team, making the first All-Pro quarterback in NFL history.

==== 1921 season ====
In 1921, Driscoll returned to the Cardinals as the team's quarterback and captain, he also did "most of the coaching". Highlights of Driscoll's 1921 season include:

- On October 2, 1921, Driscoll led the Cardinals to a 20–0 victory over the Minneapolis Marines. He ran for a touchdown, threw a 33-yard touchdown pass to Marquardt, kicked two extra points, and had long runs of 30 and 45 yards.
- On October 23, 1921, Driscoll was carried off the field in the first quarter of a game with the Columbus Panhandles. Driscoll reportedly sustained "a couple smashed ribs."
- On November 6, 1921, Driscoll returned to the Cardinals in a 7–0 victory over the Hammond Pros. The Chicago Tribune praised Driscoll's accurate forward passing in a game in which he accounted for all points scored on a touchdown run and an extra point.
- On November 20, 1921, Driscoll drop-kicked a field goal from the 35-yard line with less than four minutes remaining to secure a 3–3 tie with the Green Bay Packers.
- On December 18, 1921, the Cardinals played the APFA champion Chicago Staleys to a scoreless tie. According to the Chicago Tribune, Driscoll's "brilliant playing" resulted in the Staleys' only loss of the season.

The Cardinals finished their 1921 season with a 6–3–2 record (3–3–2 against APFA opponents). Driscoll was not selected as an All-Pro.

==== 1922 season ====
Driscoll was thrown out of the first 1922 game with the Chicago Bears for fighting and wound up on the back cover of the Chicago Tribune.

As quarterback and coach, Driscoll led the 1922 Chicago Cardinals to an 8–3 record, good for third place in the NFL. Highlights of Driscoll's 1922 season include:

- On October 15, 1922, Driscoll led the Cardinals to a 16–3 victory over the Green Bay Packers. After the game, the Green Bay Press-Gazette wrote: "Paddy Driscoll is just as brilliant a football player as ever. He never seems to get old and in Sunday's game, he stood out as the mainstay of the Cardinal machine. Driscoll ran back punts brilliantly, he skirted outside of right tackle frequently for long gains and, as usual, his trusty kicking toe was very much in evidence."
- On October 30, 1922, in a 37–6 victory over Columbus, Driscoll scored a rushing touchdown, kicked two extra points, and added "a pretty dropkick from a difficult angle on the 47-yard line."
- On Thanksgiving Day, the Cardinals defeated the Chicago Bears, 6–0, before a crowd of 14,000. Driscoll drop-kicked a field goal in the game.
- On December 10, 1922, Driscoll drop-kicked three field goals to account for all the scoring in a 9–0 victory, the second victory over the Bears in two weeks. The game drew 12,000 spectators.

At the end of the 1922 season, Driscoll was picked as a first-team All-Pro at the halfback position.

==== 1923 season ====
During the 1923 season, Driscoll appeared in eight of the Cardinals' games and led the team to an 8–4 record and led the team with 78 points on seven touchdowns, 10 field goals, and six extra points. Despite appearing in only two-thirds of the Cardinals' games, Driscoll was the NFL's leading scorer during the 1923 NFL season. At the end of the season, he was selected as a consensus first-team halfback on the 1923 All-Pro Team. Highlights of Driscoll's 1923 season included the following:

- On September 30, 1923, Driscoll drop-kicked a 47-yard field goal in a 3–0 victory over the Buffalo All-Americans.
- On October 7, 1923, Driscoll scored four touchdowns and kicked three extra points to score 27 points in a 60–0 victory over the Rochester Jeffersons.
- On October 14, 1923, Driscoll scored all 19 points (two touchdowns, two drop-kicked field goals, and one extra point) in a 19–0 victory over the Akron Pros.
- On October 21, 1923, Driscoll again scored all of the Cardinals' points with three drop-kicked field goals in a 9–0 victory over the Minneapolis Marines. Through the first four games of the seasons, Driscoll had scored 58 points.
- On October 28, 1923, and for the third consecutive game, Driscoll scored all of the Cardinals' points (a touchdown, two drop-kicked field goals, and an extra point) in a 13–3 victory over the Dayton Triangles. Through the first five games, Driscoll totaled 71 points scored.
- On November 4, 1923, Driscoll scored the Cardinals' only points on a field goal in a 7–3 loss to the Canton Bulldogs. Driscoll was injured in the game against the Bulldogs and did not appear in the following week's game against the Hammond Pros.
- On November 18, 1923, Driscoll scored four points (a field goal and an extra point) in a 10–0 victory over the Duluth Kelleys. Through seven games in which Driscoll had appeared, he had tallied 78 points.

==== 1924 season ====
In the opening game of the 1924 season, Driscoll drop-kicked a 55-yard field goal that stood as an NFL field goal record until 1953. He also scored a touchdown and kicked an extra point in the game. The following week, he kicked a 40-yard field goal for the only points of the game in a 3–0 victory over Green Bay. He secured his reputation as "the greatest drop kicker in the National Football league." In October 1924, he gave advice on proper drop-kicking technique in a syndicated newspaper piece.

==== 1925 season ====
Driscoll carries the ball around end in tune-up game ahead of the 1925 National League season.

Driscoll led the 1925 Cardinals to a 12–2–1 record and the NFL championship. Driscoll was the team's leading scorer with 67 points on 11 field goals, four touchdowns, and 10 extra points. He was the NFL's second highest scorer in 1925, trailing only Charlie Berry. After the season, he was selected as a consensus first-team player on the 1925 All-Pro Team. Highlights of Driscoll's 1925 season included the following:

- On September 20, 1925, Driscoll returned an interception 50 yards and kicked an extra point in a 14–6 victory over Harvey.
- On September 27, 1925, Driscoll scored all of the Cardinals' points in a 10–6 loss to the Hammond Pros. He drop-kicked two field goals, including one from the 44-yard line. He also fumbled a punt at the Cardinals' 15-yard line to set up Hammond's winning touchdown.
- On October 4, 1925, Driscoll drop-kicked two field goals in a 34–0 victory over the Milwaukee Badgers.
- On October 11, 1925, Driscoll drop-kicked four field goals, including one from 50 yards, and an extra point in a 19–9 victory over the Columbus Tigers.
- On October 18, 1925, Driscoll did not play in the first half, but had an 80-yard touchdown run in the second half in a 20–7 victory over the Kansas City Cowboys.
- On November 8, 1925, Driscoll drop-kicked the game-winning field goal in the final minute of a 9–6 victory over the Green Bay Packers.
- On November 22, 1925, Driscoll caught a pass and ran the remaining 15 yards for a touchdown. He fell on his face on frozen ground late in the first quarter and sat on the bench for the remainder of the game "with his nose in a sling." The Cardinals beat Dayton.
- On Thanksgiving Day, November 26, 1925, Red Grange made his professional football debut for the Chicago Bears in a scoreless tie against the Cardinals. The game was played before a capacity crowd of 36,000 at Wrigley Field. Driscoll consistently punted the ball away from Grange, drawing boos from fans who wanted to see Grange "do his stuff." The Chicago Tribune credited Driscoll's strategy and "unerring punting", noting that the Cardinals "were out there to win; not to let Grange stage a Roman holiday at their expense."

=== Chicago Bears ===
==== 1926 season ====
In September 1926, Driscoll was sold by the Cardinals to the Chicago Bears. The Cardinals' decision was prompted by an offer Driscoll received for a much higher salary to play in C. C. Pyle's American Football League; the Cardinals could not meet the higher salary and sold him to the Bears in hopes Driscoll would sign there and remain in the NFL. Driscoll signed a contract with the Bears at a reported salary of $10,000. Driscoll started all 16 games for the 1926 Bears, led the team to a 12–1–3 record, and scored a career-high 86 points on six touchdowns, 12 field goals, and 14 extra points. For the second time in four years, Driscoll was the NFL's leading scorer. He also broke his own NFL records with 12 field goals in a single season. At the end of the season, he was selected as a consensus first-team halfback on the 1926 All-Pro Team.

== Coaching and administrative career ==
=== St. Mel and Chicago Cardinals ===
From 1924 to 1936, Driscoll was the athletic director and basketball and football coach at St. Mel High School in Chicago. During Driscoll's tenure with St. Mel, the school won 24 championships in football, basketball, and swimming. The school won the national Catholic basketball championship in 1924 and was national runner-up in 1931. During the first half of the 1930s, he also served as a scout for the Chicago Bears.

On November 3, 1936, Driscoll was hired as an assistant coach for the Chicago Cardinals. Before Driscoll joined the coaching staff, the 1936 Cardinals had lost seven consecutive games. After Driscoll joined the staff, the Cardinals compiled a 3–1–1 record.

=== Marquette ===
In March 1937, Driscoll was hired as the head football coach at Marquette University in Milwaukee. The Marquette football team performed poorly in four years under Driscoll, compiling records of 3–6 in 1937, 1–7 in 1938, 4–4 in 1939, and 2–6–1 in 1940. His overall coaching record at Marquette was 10–23–1. On October 19, 1940, after a 7–7 tie with Creighton, Driscoll tendered his resignation, effective at the end of the 1940 season.

=== Chicago Bears ===
In July 1941, Driscoll was hired as an assistant coach of the Chicago Bears. He remained as an assistant coach under George Halas for the next 15 years through the 1955 season. During Driscoll's tenure as an assistant coach with the Bears, club won four NFL championships in 1941, 1942, 1943, and 1946.

In February 1956, Driscoll was hired by George Halas as his successor as head coach of the Chicago Bears. Driscoll led the 1956 Bears to the NFL Western Division championship with a 9–2–1 record. The Bears lost to the New York Giants in the 1956 NFL Championship Game. He remained head coach of the Bears in 1957, compiling a 5–7 record. In 1958, Halas returned as the Bears' head coach, with Driscoll becoming administrative vice president with responsibilities for "methods and organization in the competitive phases of the club's operations."

Driscoll remained employed by the Bears in an administrative capacity, serving as team vice president. In June 1963, he was appointed director of the Bears' research and planning unit, including responsibility for game films and scouting charts.

== Awards and honors ==
Driscoll received multiple honors and awards arising out of his accomplishments as a football player, including the following:

- In 1941, he was chosen by George Halas as the quarterback on the all-time Chicago Bears team.
- In 1965, Driscoll was inducted into the Pro Football Hall of Fame. Only three quarterbacks were inducted before Driscoll: Sammy Baugh & Dutch Clark in 1963, and Jimmy Conzelman in 1964.
- In 1969, he was selected for the NFL 1920s All-Decade Team.
- In 1974, Driscoll was inducted into the College Football Hall of Fame.

== Family and later years ==
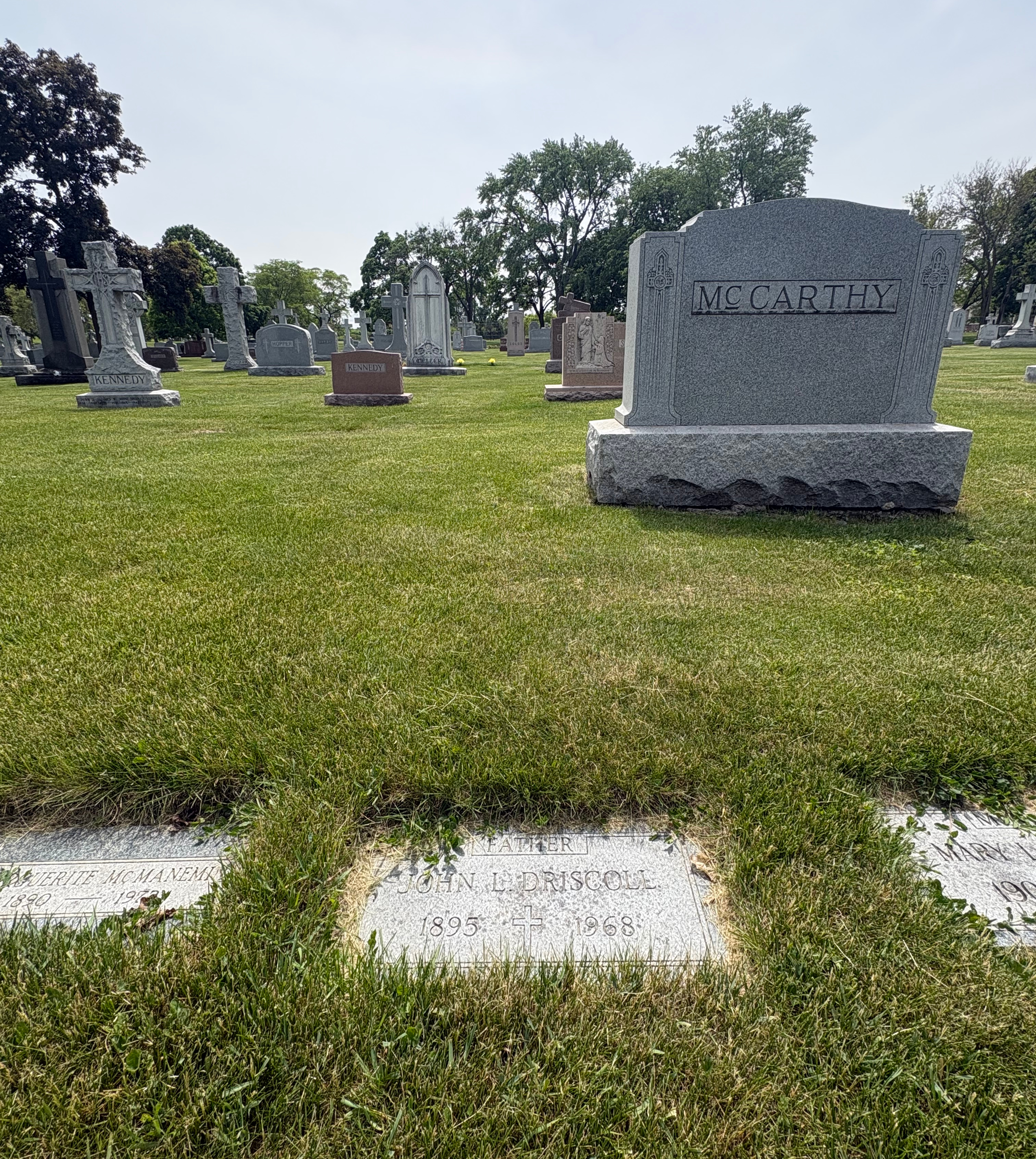
Driscoll's grave at All Saints Cemetery

Driscoll married Mary Loretta McCarthy in June 1928 at St. Ita's Catholic Church in Chicago. They had a son, John, born in 1932. In 1960, his wife died after a long illness in Evanston at age 57. He lived in his later years in Park Ridge, Illinois, with his son John.

Driscoll died in 1968 at Chicago's Illinois Masonic Hospital at the age of 73. He had entered the hospital for treatment of a leg ailment. He was buried at the All Saints Catholic Cemetery in Des Plaines, Illinois.

George Halas called Driscoll "the greatest athlete I ever knew."

== Head coaching record ==
=== College ===
Year	Team	Overall	Conference	Standing	Bowl/playoffs
Marquette Golden Avalanche / Hilltoppers (Independent) (1937–1940)
1937	Marquette	3–6			
1938	Marquette	1–7			
1939	Marquette	4–4			
1940	Marquette	2–6–1			
Marquette:		10–23–1			
Total:		10–23–1			

=== NFL ===
Team	Year	Regular season					Postseason			
Team	Year	Won	Lost	Ties	Win %	Finish	Won	Lost	Win %	Result
CRD	1920	6	2	2	.700	4th in APFA	–	–	–	–
CRD	1921	3	3	2	.500	8th in APFA	–	–	–	–
CRD	1922	8	3	0	.727	3rd in NFL	–	–	–	–
CRD total		17	8	4	.655		–	–	–	–
CHI	1956	9	2	1	.792	1st in Western Division	0	1	.000	Lost to Giants in 1956 Championship game.
CHI	1957	5	7	0	.417	5th in Western Division	–	–	–	–
CHI total		14	9	1	.604		0	1	.000	–
Total		31	17	5	.632		0	1	.000	–
