= 1921 Chicago Cardinals season =

American football team season

- Owner: Chris O'Brien
- Head coach: Paddy Driscoll
- Home stadium: Normal Park (Chicago)

Results
- Record: 3–3–2 APFA (7–3–2 overall)
- League place: 8th APFA

The 1921 Chicago Cardinals season was their second in the American Professional Football Association. The Cardinals failed to improve on their previous output of 6–2–2, winning only three APFA games. They finished eighth in the league.

Although a myth persists that the team billed itself as the "Racine Cardinals", by 1921, the press generally referred to the team as the "Chicago Cardinals" and references to Chris O'Brien's team with the Racine name were few. The team had no connection to Racine, Wisconsin, and played at Normal Park on Chicago's Racine Avenue.

== Schedule ==
Game	Date	Opponent	Result	Record	Venue	Attendance	Recap	Sources
–	September 25	Racine Horlick-Legion	W 27–0	—	Normal Park		—	
1	October 2	Minneapolis Marines	W 20–0	1–0	Normal Park	4,000	Recap	
2	October 9	Akron Pros	L 0–23	1–1	Normal Park	6,000	Recap	
3	October 16	Rock Island Independents	L 7–14	1–2	Normal Park	4,000	Recap	
4	October 23	Columbus Panhandles	W 17–6	2–2	Normal Park	6,000	Recap	
—	October 30	Hammond Pros	postponed due to heavy rain					
5	November 6	Hammond Pros	W 7–0	3–2	Normal Park		Recap	
—	November 11	Canton Bulldogs	cancelled due to unplayable muddy field					
6	November 20	Green Bay Packers	T 3–3	3–2–1	Normal Park	2,000	Recap	
–	November 24	Chicago Stayms-Catholic Foresters	W 27–0	—	Pyott Park		—	
–	November 27	Gary Elks	W 21–0	—	Normal Park	2,000	—	
7	December 4	Akron Pros	L 0–7	3–3–1	Normal Park	3,500	Recap	
8	December 18	at Chicago Staleys	T 0–0	3–3–2	Cubs Park	2,700	Recap	
—	January 9	Chicago Stayms-Foresters	W 6–0	—	Normal Park	3,000	—	
Note: Games in italics are non-league opponents. Armistice Day: November 11. Thanksgiving: November 24.

== Standings ==
APFA standings
	W	L	T	PCT	PF	PA	STK
Chicago Staleys	9	1	1	.900	128	53	T1
Buffalo All-Americans	9	1	2	.900	211	29	L1
Akron Pros	8	3	1	.727	148	31	W1
Canton Bulldogs	5	2	3	.714	106	55	W1
Rock Island Independents	4	2	1	.667	65	30	L1
Evansville Crimson Giants	3	2	0	.600	89	46	W1
Green Bay Packers	3	2	1	.600	70	55	L1
Dayton Triangles	4	4	1	.500	96	67	L1
Chicago Cardinals	3	3	2	.500	54	53	T1
Rochester Jeffersons	2	3	0	.400	85	76	W2
Cleveland Tigers	3	5	0	.375	95	58	L1
Washington Senators	1	2	0	.334	21	43	L1
Cincinnati Celts	1	3	0	.250	14	117	L2
Hammond Pros	1	3	1	.250	17	45	L2
Minneapolis Marines	1	3	0	.250	37	41	L1
Detroit Tigers	1	5	1	.167	19	109	L5
Columbus Panhandles	1	8	0	.111	47	222	W1
Tonawanda Kardex	0	1	0	.000	0	45	L1
Muncie Flyers	0	2	0	.000	0	28	L2
Louisville Brecks	0	2	0	.000	0	27	L2
New York Brickley Giants	0	2	0	.000	0	72	L2

Note: Tie games were not officially counted in the standings until 1972.

== Roster ==
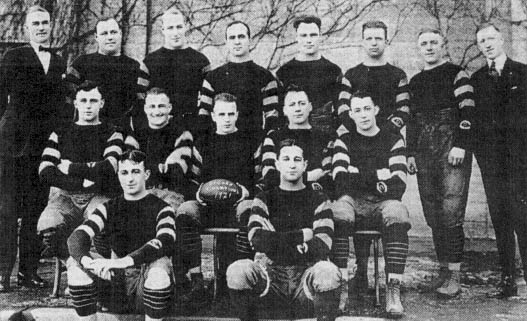
1921 Chicago Cardinals team photo.

The 1921 Chicago Cardinals consisted the following players, with the number of league games played appended in parentheses. One member of the team, star quarterback Paddy Driscoll, was later inducted into the Professional Football Hall of Fame.

Linemen

- Willis Brennan (6)
- Garland Buckeye (5)
- Leo Chappell (1)
- Fred Gillies (8)
- Charlie Knight (4)
- Paul LaRoss (2)
- Rube Marquardt (3)
- Nick McInerney (6)
- Red O'Connor (5)
- Frank Rydzeski (8)
- Lenny Sachs (8)
- Walter Voight (1)
- Clyde Zoia (8)

Backs

- Norm Barry (3)
- Ping Bodie (1)
- Harry Curran (1)
- Paddy Driscoll (8)
- Dick Egan (1)
- Bernie Halstrom (5)
- Arnie Horween (3)
- Ralph Horween (2)
- Bob Koehler (4)
- Earl Potteiger (1)
- John Scanlon (4)
- Pete Steger (6)
