= 1921 Akron Pros season =

Sports season

- Owner: Akron Exhibition Co. Charles Stahl
- President: Frank Nied, Art Ranney
- Head coach: Fritz Pollard, Elgie Tobin
- Home stadium: League Park

Results
- Record: 8–3–1
- Division place: 3rd APFA
- Playoffs: No playoffs until 1932

The 1921 Akron Pros season was their second completed in the young American Professional Football Association (APFA). The team won 8 games, lost 3, and tied 1 during the year, good for third place in the league.

== Schedule ==
Game	Date	Opponent	Result	Record	Venue	Attendance	Recap	Sources
1	September 25	Columbus Panhandles	W 14–0	1–0	League Park	1,700	Recap	
2	October 2	Cincinnati Celts	W 41–0	2–0	League Park	2,500	Recap	
3	October 9	at Chicago Cardinals	W 23–0	3–0	Normal Park	6,000	Recap	
4	October 16	at Detroit Tigers	W 20–0	4–0	Navin Field	6,000	Recap	
5	October 23	at Canton Bulldogs	W 3–0	5–0	Lakeside Park	7,000	Recap	
6	October 30	Rochester Jeffersons	W 19–0	6–0	League Park	4,000	Recap	
7	November 6	at Columbus Panhandles	W 21–0	7–0	Neil Park	4,100	Recap	
8	November 13	at Buffalo All-Americans	T 0–0	7–0–1	Buffalo Baseball Park	4,600	Recap	
9	November 20	at Dayton Triangles	L 0–3	7–1–1	Triangle Park		Recap	
10	November 24	Canton Bulldogs	L 0–14	7–2–1	League Park	4,000	Recap	
11	December 3	at Buffalo All-Americans	L 0–14	7–3–1	Canisius Villa	3,000	Recap	
12	December 4	at Chicago Cardinals	W 7–0	8–3–1	Normal Park	3,500	Recap	
Note: Thanksgiving Day: November 24.

== Standings ==
APFA standings
	W	L	T	PCT	PF	PA	STK
Chicago Staleys	9	1	1	.900	128	53	T1
Buffalo All-Americans	9	1	2	.900	211	29	L1
Akron Pros	8	3	1	.727	148	31	W1
Canton Bulldogs	5	2	3	.714	106	55	W1
Rock Island Independents	4	2	1	.667	65	30	L1
Evansville Crimson Giants	3	2	0	.600	89	46	W1
Green Bay Packers	3	2	1	.600	70	55	L1
Dayton Triangles	4	4	1	.500	96	67	L1
Chicago Cardinals	3	3	2	.500	54	53	T1
Rochester Jeffersons	2	3	0	.400	85	76	W2
Cleveland Tigers	3	5	0	.375	95	58	L1
Washington Senators	1	2	0	.334	21	43	L1
Cincinnati Celts	1	3	0	.250	14	117	L2
Hammond Pros	1	3	1	.250	17	45	L2
Minneapolis Marines	1	3	0	.250	37	41	L1
Detroit Tigers	1	5	1	.167	19	109	L5
Columbus Panhandles	1	8	0	.111	47	222	W1
Tonawanda Kardex	0	1	0	.000	0	45	L1
Muncie Flyers	0	2	0	.000	0	28	L2
Louisville Brecks	0	2	0	.000	0	27	L2
New York Brickley Giants	0	2	0	.000	0	72	L2

Note: Tie games were not officially counted in the standings until 1972.
