= 1921 Minneapolis Marines season =

Sports season

- Head coach: Rube Ursella
- Home stadium: Nicollet Park

Results
- Record: 3–5 Overall; 1–3 APFA
- League place: T-13th in APFA

The 1921 Minneapolis Marines season was their inaugural season in the young American Professional Football Association (APFA). The team finished with a 1–3 record against league opponents, and tied for thirteenth place in the league.

== Schedule ==
Newspaper ad promoting the final game of the 1921 season for the Marines, held in Sioux City, Iowa.

Game	Date	Opponent	Result	Record	Venue	Attendance	Recap	Sources
1	October 2	at Chicago Cardinals	L 0–20	0–1	Normal Park	4,000	Recap	
—	October 9	Minneapolis Ideals	canceled because of rain					
—	October 16	Minneapolis Knights of Columbus	W 9–0	—	Nicollet Park	"a large crowd"	—	
2	October 23	at Green Bay Packers	L 6–7	0–2	Hagemeister Park	6,000	Recap	
3	October 30	Columbus Panhandles	W 28–0	1–2	Nicollet Park	"a large crowd"	Recap	
4	November 6	at Rock Island Independents	L 3–14	1–3	Douglas Park	< 2,000	Recap	
—	November 11	at Duluth Knights of Columbus	L 0–14	—	Athletic Park	5,000	—	
—	November 13	Minneapolis All-Stars	postponed because of snow					
—	November 20	Minneapolis All-Stars	postponed because of snow					
—	November 24	Minneapolis All-Stars	W 7–0	—	Nicollet Park	1,500	—	
—	December 4	at Olson's All-Stars	L 0–10	—	Mizzou Park	2,500	—	
Note: Games in italics indicate a non-league opponent. November 11: Friday. Thanksgiving Day: November 24.

== Standings ==
View of the back of the grandstand of Nicollet Park, home field of the Marines.

APFA standings
	W	L	T	PCT	PF	PA	STK
Chicago Staleys	9	1	1	.900	128	53	T1
Buffalo All-Americans	9	1	2	.900	211	29	L1
Akron Pros	8	3	1	.727	148	31	W1
Canton Bulldogs	5	2	3	.714	106	55	W1
Rock Island Independents	4	2	1	.667	65	30	L1
Evansville Crimson Giants	3	2	0	.600	89	46	W1
Green Bay Packers	3	2	1	.600	70	55	L1
Dayton Triangles	4	4	1	.500	96	67	L1
Chicago Cardinals	3	3	2	.500	54	53	T1
Rochester Jeffersons	2	3	0	.400	85	76	W2
Cleveland Tigers	3	5	0	.375	95	58	L1
Washington Senators	1	2	0	.334	21	43	L1
Cincinnati Celts	1	3	0	.250	14	117	L2
Hammond Pros	1	3	1	.250	17	45	L2
Minneapolis Marines	1	3	0	.250	37	41	L1
Detroit Tigers	1	5	1	.167	19	109	L5
Columbus Panhandles	1	8	0	.111	47	222	W1
Tonawanda Kardex	0	1	0	.000	0	45	L1
Muncie Flyers	0	2	0	.000	0	28	L2
Louisville Brecks	0	2	0	.000	0	27	L2
New York Brickley Giants	0	2	0	.000	0	72	L2

Note: Tie games were not officially counted in the standings until 1972.

== Roster ==
Quarterback Rube Ursella came over from the Rock Island Independents in 1921.

The following individuals saw action in at least one game for the Minneapolis Marines during the 1921 season. The number of 1921 NFL game appearances is listed for each in parentheses. There were no future members of the Pro Football Hall of Fame on the 1921 Marines roster. Team captain and star was quarterback Rube Ursella.

Linemen

- Oscar Christianson (4)
- Harold Erickson (4)
- Dutch Gaustad (4)
- Harry Gunderson (4)
- George Kramer (3)
- John Norbeck (2)
- Mike Palmer (4)
- Sheepy Redeen (4)
- Rudy Tersch (3)

Backs

- Ainer Cleve (3)
- Ben Dvorak (4)
- Bill Irgens (2)
- Charlie Jonasen (1)
- Pete Regnier (4)
- Art Sampson (4)
- Rube Ursella - captain (4)
