= 1921 Rock Island Independents season =

Sports season

- General manager: Walter Flanigan
- Head coach: Frank Coughlin, Jimmy Conzelman
- Home stadium: Douglas Park

Results
- Record: 4–2–1 APFA (5–2–1 overall)
- League place: 5th in APFA

Quarter-page newspaper ad for the 1921 season opener of the green-and-whites against the Detroit Tigers.

The 1921 Rock Island Independents season was their second completed in the young American Professional Football Association (APFA), later rechristened the National Football League. The team failed to improve on their previous record against league opponents of 6–2–2, winning only four games. They finished fifth in the league.

== Background ==
The Independents entered their second season in the American Professional Football Association (APFA) with an air of positivity. Eight league games were tentatively scheduled for 1921 — four at home and four on the road, concluding with a November 27 match-up with the Columbus Panhandles at Rock Island's Douglas Park. Ultimately, only seven league games would be managed, with just two of these contests at home, both weakly attended. It would be a forgettable year.

This lack of home dates and poor attendance was ironic, as seating at Douglas park was significantly expanded for the 1921 season. On September 30 a squad of fifty men slapped up new bleacher seating to increase capacity at the facility to 6,000, with the ability to accommodate an additional 1,500 people watching from cars or in standing room.

The team was broadly supported by the community of Rock Island, Illinois and other neighboring members of the "Tri-Cities", Moline, Illinois, and Davenport, Iowa. The evening of Saturday, October 1, the night before the big opening game against the Detroit Tigers, a marching band led an automobile parade of 1,000 Islander fans that traveled to all three cities to promote the team and the season. For away games one local newspaper, the Rock Island Argus, put up a large gridboard outside its offices and kept up with the game by direct wire, marking the position of the ball on the board. Large crowds were attracted to follow the action, with more than 2,000 people blocking Second Avenue to follow the progress of the Green Bay Packers game on October 30.

For all the energy and support shown the team, the number of people through the gate — just 3,300 for the opener and fewer than 2,000 for the team's second and final home game of the season against Minneapolis the first Sunday in November — had to be a major disappointment to the team and its organizers.

== Schedule ==
Game	Date	Opponent	Result	Record	Venue	Attendance	Recap	Sources
1	October 2	Detroit Tigers	T 0–0	0–0–1	Douglas Park	3,304	Recap	
2	October 10	at Chicago Staleys	L 10–14	0–1–1	Staley Field	4,000	Recap	
3	October 16	at Chicago Cardinals	W 14–7	1–1–1	Normal Park	4,000	Recap	
4	October 23	at Detroit Tigers	W 14–0	2–1–1	Navin Field	3,000	Recap	
5	October 30	at Green Bay Packers	W 13–3	3–1–1	Hagemeister Park	6,000	Recap	
6	November 6	Minneapolis Marines	W 14–3	4–1–1	Douglas Park	< 2,000	Recap	
7	November 13	at Chicago Staleys	L 0–3	4–2–1	Cubs Park	6,000	Recap	
–	November 20	Duluth Knights of Columbus	W 28–0	–	Douglas Park	800	—	
–	November 27	Columbus Panhandles	(scheduled)					
Note: Games in italics indicate a non-league opponent.

== Standings ==
Star of the 1921 Rock Island team was quarterback Jimmy Conzelman, shown here in the team's green-and-white uniform.

APFA standings
	W	L	T	PCT	PF	PA	STK
Chicago Staleys	9	1	1	.900	128	53	T1
Buffalo All-Americans	9	1	2	.900	211	29	L1
Akron Pros	8	3	1	.727	148	31	W1
Canton Bulldogs	5	2	3	.714	106	55	W1
Rock Island Independents	4	2	1	.667	65	30	L1
Evansville Crimson Giants	3	2	0	.600	89	46	W1
Green Bay Packers	3	2	1	.600	70	55	L1
Dayton Triangles	4	4	1	.500	96	67	L1
Chicago Cardinals	3	3	2	.500	54	53	T1
Rochester Jeffersons	2	3	0	.400	85	76	W2
Cleveland Tigers	3	5	0	.375	95	58	L1
Washington Senators	1	2	0	.334	21	43	L1
Cincinnati Celts	1	3	0	.250	14	117	L2
Hammond Pros	1	3	1	.250	17	45	L2
Minneapolis Marines	1	3	0	.250	37	41	L1
Detroit Tigers	1	5	1	.167	19	109	L5
Columbus Panhandles	1	8	0	.111	47	222	W1
Tonawanda Kardex	0	1	0	.000	0	45	L1
Muncie Flyers	0	2	0	.000	0	28	L2
Louisville Brecks	0	2	0	.000	0	27	L2
New York Brickley Giants	0	2	0	.000	0	72	L2

Note: Tie games were not officially counted in the standings until 1972.

== Roster ==
Team photo of the 1921 Rock Island Independents.

The following individuals appeared in at least one game for the 1921 Rock Island Independents. The total number of NFL games in which they saw action in 1921 follows in parentheses.

There were two future members of the Pro Football Hall of Fame on the roster — tackle Ed Healey and quarterback Jimmy Conzelman, both members of the hall's second class, inducted in September 1964.

Linemen

- Dick Barker (3)
- Walt Buland (6)
- Frank Coughlin (3)
- Jug Earp (6)
- Freeman Fitzgerald (2)
- Hal Hanson (6)
- John Hasbrouck (3)
- Dave Hayes (3)
- Ed Healey (7)
- Emmett Keefe (7)
- Dewey Lyle (7)
- Vic Menefee (2)
- Brick Travis (5)
- Obe Wenig (7)

Backs

- Lane Bridgford (5)
- Walt Brindley (2)
- Jimmy Conzelman (7)
- Eddie Duggan (3)
- Buck Gavin (3)
- Jerry Johnson (2)
- Grover Malone (3)
- Jerry Mansfield (1)
- Sid Nichols (7)
- Eddie Novak (7)
- Paddy Quinn (1)
- Viv Vanderloo (3)
