= 1921 Chicago Staleys season =

Sports season

- Owner: George Halas, Dutch Sternaman
- Head coach: George Halas
- Home stadium: Staley Field (Decatur), Cubs Park (Chicago)

Results
- Record: 9–1–1 APFA (10–1–1 Overall)
- League place: 1st APFA

The 1921 Chicago Staleys season was their second regular season completed in the young American Professional Football Association (APFA), later known as the National Football League. All games were played at home, with the team opening the year in Decatur, Illinois before moving to Chicago in time for its second league game.

The team improved on their 10–1–2 record from 1920 to a 9–1–1 record under head coach/player George Halas earning them a first-place finish in the team standings and their first league championship — the best finish of the initial Halas era.

At the end of the season, team Secretary Morgan O'Brien was appointed as the vice-president of the APFA.

== Background ==
=== From Decatur to Chicago ===
The Staleys began the 1921 season at Staley Field in Decatur, a facility with extremely limited fan seating.

The Staleys began the 1921 season in Decatur, Illinois, playing the team's non-league opener and first league game against the Rock Island Independents on Staley Field in that city. The Staleys suited up 19 men for their October 10 league opener, of whom 18 had served in some branch of the military during World War I.

The Staleys' popularity exceeded the capacity of their home venue, with the limited grandstands seating only 1,500, resulting in large standing room only crowds spilling around the perimeter of the playing field. Fans were charged $1 to attend games and company employees received a 50 percent discount, which was deemed not economically viable for the struggling team. This prompted a move of the team to in time for the third game of the year to Cubs Park (now Wrigley Field) in Chicago — a 14,000 seat venue.

The necessity of the move to Chicago seems to have been understood, with a National Guard regimental armory in Decatur fitted with a miniature football field to track the ball as play-by-play was telegraphed from the game against Dayton in Chicago and announced to the assemblage by loudspeaker. A direct wire was reserved for repeat of festivities for the October 30 game against the Canton Bulldogs, but the game was cancelled. Other games were handled in a similar manner throughout the year.

The move to Chicago had been suggested by A. E. Staley himself. The corn starch magnate had come to view his company-sponsored football team as an onerous expense, with its 25 players on the company payroll, paid not only to work but for two hours of football practice each day. "Why don't you go to Chicago?" Staley had suggested to Halas ahead of the 1921 season, offering the opinion that professional football had great potential there and offering $5,000 in seed money to Halas in exchange for keeping the "Staleys" label on the team for another year. A short contract transferring ownership of the team from Staley to Halas was signed October 5, 1921, with the team's offensive star, Edward "Dutch" Sternaman, made a partner about that same time.

Halas and Sternaman pulled up stakes from Decatur and moved into the Blackwood Hotel in Chicago — an inexpensive long-term residence facility located within walking distance of Cubs Park. Many other players on the team followed suit and did likewise.

=== The 1921 team ===
The speedy Sternaman remained the team's biggest star in 1921, but he was joined by others, including newcomers Gaylord Stinchcomb, who became the starting quarterback, and three-time All-American Chic Harley, who took over at right half. The line was tough and experienced, anchored by ends Halas and Guy Chamberlain, center George Trafton, and right tackle Hugh Blacklock.

Sternaman scored 32 points, most by kicking, and threw one touchdown pass. Halas had 3 touchdown receptions while Stinchcomb led the team with 4 touchdown runs.

The Starchworkers did lose a key player from 1920, when halfback Jimmy Conzelman left to captain and play for the Rock Island Independents. Star halfback Paddy Driscoll, borrowed from the Chicago Cardinals late in the 1920 season, also returned to his former team.

== Schedule ==
| Game | Date | Opponent | Result | Record | Venue | Attendance | Recap | Sources |
|---|---|---|---|---|---|---|---|---|
| — | October 2 | Waukegan American Legion | W 35–0 | 1–0 | Staley Field | | — | |
| 1 | October 10 | Rock Island Independents | W 14–10 | 2–0 | Staley Field | 4,000 | Recap | |
| 2 | October 16 | Rochester Jeffersons | W 16–13 | 3–0 | Cubs Park | 8,000 | Recap | |
| 3 | October 23 | Dayton Triangles | W 7–0 | 4–0 | Cubs Park | 7,000+ | Recap | |
| — | October 30 | Canton Bulldogs | canceled due to heavy rain | | | | | |
| 4 | November 6 | Detroit Tigers | W 20–9 | 5–0 | Cubs Park | 6,000 | Recap | |
| 5 | November 13 | Rock Island Independents | W 3–0 | 6–0 | Cubs Park | 6,000 | Recap | |
| 6 | November 20 | Cleveland Tigers | W 22–7 | 7–0 | Cubs Park | 10,000 | Recap | |
| 7 | November 24 | Buffalo All-Americans | L 6–7 | 7–1 | Cubs Park | | Recap | |
| 8 | November 27 | Green Bay Packers | W 20–0 | 8–1 | Cubs Park | 7,000 | Recap | |
| 9 | December 4 | Buffalo All-Americans | W 10–7 | 9–1 | Cubs Park | 12,000 | Recap | |
| 10 | December 11 | Canton Bulldogs | W 10–0 | 10–1 | Cubs Park | 3,000 | Recap | |
| 11 | December 18 | Chicago Cardinals | T 0–0 | 10–1–1 | Cubs Park | 2,700 | Recap | |
Note: Games in italics indicate a non-league opponent. Thanksgiving Day: November 24.

== Standings ==
Four veteran linemen of the 1921 Staleys team. The photos are taken across Staley Field in Decatur, with the starch works in the background.

APFA standings
| | W | L | T | PCT | PF | PA | STK |
|---|---|---|---|---|---|---|---|
| Chicago Staleys | 9 | 1 | 1 | .900 | 128 | 53 | T1 |
| Buffalo All-Americans | 9 | 1 | 2 | .900 | 211 | 29 | L1 |
| Akron Pros | 8 | 3 | 1 | .727 | 148 | 31 | W1 |
| Canton Bulldogs | 5 | 2 | 3 | .714 | 106 | 55 | W1 |
| Rock Island Independents | 4 | 2 | 1 | .667 | 65 | 30 | L1 |
| Evansville Crimson Giants | 3 | 2 | 0 | .600 | 89 | 46 | W1 |
| Green Bay Packers | 3 | 2 | 1 | .600 | 70 | 55 | L1 |
| Dayton Triangles | 4 | 4 | 1 | .500 | 96 | 67 | L1 |
| Chicago Cardinals | 3 | 3 | 2 | .500 | 54 | 53 | T1 |
| Rochester Jeffersons | 2 | 3 | 0 | .400 | 85 | 76 | W2 |
| Cleveland Tigers | 3 | 5 | 0 | .375 | 95 | 58 | L1 |
| Washington Senators | 1 | 2 | 0 | .334 | 21 | 43 | L1 |
| Cincinnati Celts | 1 | 3 | 0 | .250 | 14 | 117 | L2 |
| Hammond Pros | 1 | 3 | 1 | .250 | 17 | 45 | L2 |
| Minneapolis Marines | 1 | 3 | 0 | .250 | 37 | 41 | L1 |
| Detroit Tigers | 1 | 5 | 1 | .167 | 19 | 109 | L5 |
| Columbus Panhandles | 1 | 8 | 0 | .111 | 47 | 222 | W1 |
| Tonawanda Kardex | 0 | 1 | 0 | .000 | 0 | 45 | L1 |
| Muncie Flyers | 0 | 2 | 0 | .000 | 0 | 28 | L2 |
| Louisville Brecks | 0 | 2 | 0 | .000 | 0 | 27 | L2 |
| New York Brickley Giants | 0 | 2 | 0 | .000 | 0 | 72 | L2 |

Note: Tie games were not officially counted in the standings until 1972.

== De facto championship game ==
The All-Americans agreed to rematch the Staleys on December 4 on the condition that the game would be considered a "post-season" exhibition game not to be counted in the standings; had it not, Buffalo would have had an undefeated season and won the title. (Buffalo had played, and defeated, the Akron Pros just one day prior.) Chicago defeated Buffalo in the rematch by a score of 10–7. Halas rebutted that the second game was played on December 4 (well before teams typically stopped playing games in those days), and the Staleys played two more games against top opponents, the Canton Bulldogs and Chicago Cardinals after the second Buffalo game (though, at the time of the Buffalo-Chicago matchup, Chicago had played three fewer games than Buffalo).

The league counted the All-Americans game in the standings, against Buffalo's wishes, resulting in Buffalo (9–1–2) and Chicago (9–1–1) being tied atop the standings. The league then implemented the first ever tiebreaker: a rule, now considered archaic and removed from league rulebooks, that states that if two teams play multiple times in a season, the last game between the two teams carries more weight. Thus, the Chicago victory actually counted more in the standings, giving Chicago the championship. Buffalo sports fans have been known to refer to this, justly or unjustly, as the "Staley Swindle."

== Roster ==
The 1921 Staleys roster featured 5 All-Americans, including Chick Harley and Pete Stinchcomb, former Ohio State Buckeyes.

The 1921 Staleys consisted of the following players, with number of games played in parentheses. Three players on the squad — George Halas, Guy Chamberlin, and George Trafton — were later inducted into the Professional Football Hall of Fame.

Linemen

- Dick Barker (2)
- Hugh Blacklock (11)
- Guy Chamberlin (11)
- George Halas (11)
- John Mintun (3)
- Ralph Scott (11)
- Russ Smith (11)
- Tarzan Taylor (11)
- George Trafton (10)
- Lou Usher (3)

Backs

- George Bolan (5)
- Harry Englund (5)
- Chic Harley (9)
- Ken Huffine (10)
- Jake Lanum (7)
- Pard Pearce (8)
- Dutch Sternaman (11)
- Pete Stinchcomb (8)

== Awards ==
- APFA Champions (1)

| Preceded by Akron Pros; 1920 | NFL Champion; 1921 | Succeeded by Canton Bulldogs; 1922 |
