= Adolph Kliebhan =

American football player (1897–1963)

Profile
- Position: Quarterback

Personal information
- Born: August 14, 1897; Milwaukee, Wisconsin, U.S.
- Died: March 13, 1963 (aged 65); Wood, Wisconsin, U.S.

Career information
- College: None

Career history
- Green Bay Packers (1921)

Career statistics
- Games played: 1
- Stats at Pro Football Reference

Adolph E. Kliebhan (August 14, 1897 – March 13, 1963), sometimes listed as Kliebhahn, was a quarterback in the National Football League (NFL) who played one game for the Green Bay Packers in 1921.

== Early life ==
Kliebhan was born in Milwaukee, Wisconsin, on August 14, 1897.

== Career ==
Kliebhan played one game for the 1921 Green Bay Packers, the team's first season in the American Professional Football Association (APFA), the precursor to the modern National Football League. In the team's first APFA game, on October 23, 1921, he was the starting quarterback, though he did not throw any passes. He did not complete the game, as Curly Lambeau was substituted in his place, and he did not appear in any further games for the Packers. Because the Packers did not start using uniform numbers until 1925, Kliebhan is one of only 50 players in team history to never have a uniform number.

== Personal life ==
Kliebhan was a bowler and an official for football and baseball games. He died at the age of 65 on March 13, 1963, at a veteran's hospital in Wood, Wisconsin.

== See also ==
- List of players who appeared in only one game in the NFL (1920–1929)
