= 1921 Columbus Panhandles season =

Sports season

- Head coach: Ted Nesser
- Home stadium: Neil Field

Results
- Record: 1–8 APFA (3–8 overall)
- League place: 17th APFA

The 1921 Columbus Panhandles season was their second in the newly formed American Professional Football Association (soon to become the National Football League). The team played all but one of their nine league games on the road, finishing the year with a record of 1 win and 8 losses, seventeenth in the league.

During the 1921 season, Columbus was outscored by its opponents by a margin of better than 4 to 1.

== Schedule ==
Game	Date	Opponent	Result	Record	Venue	Attendance	Recap	Sources
1	September 25	at Akron Pros	L 0–14	0–1	League Park	2,000	Recap	
2	October 2	at Dayton Triangles	L 13–42	0–2	Triangle Park	"thousands"	Recap	
3	October 9	at Buffalo All-Americans	L 0–38	0–3	Canisius Villa	"a good-sized crowd"	Recap	
4	October 16	at Cleveland Tigers	L 9–35	0–4	Dunn Field	"several thousand"	Recap	
5	October 23	at Chicago Cardinals	L 6–17	0–5	Normal Park	6,000	Recap	
6	October 30	at Minneapolis Marines	L 0–28	0–6	Nicollet Park	"A large crowd"	Recap	
7	November 6	Akron Pros	L 0–21	0–7	Neil Field		Recap	
—	November 13	Fort Wayne Pros	W 17–7	—	Neil Field		—	
8	November 20	at Rochester Jeffersons	L 13–27	0–8	Baseball Park	2,500	Recap	
9	December 4	at Louisville Brecks	W 6–0	1–8	Eclipse Park		Recap	
—	December 11	Columbus Wagner Pirates	W 20–0	—	Neil Field		—	
Note: Games in italics indicate a non-league opponent.

== Standings ==
APFA standings
	W	L	T	PCT	PF	PA	STK
Chicago Staleys	9	1	1	.900	128	53	T1
Buffalo All-Americans	9	1	2	.900	211	29	L1
Akron Pros	8	3	1	.727	148	31	W1
Canton Bulldogs	5	2	3	.714	106	55	W1
Rock Island Independents	4	2	1	.667	65	30	L1
Evansville Crimson Giants	3	2	0	.600	89	46	W1
Green Bay Packers	3	2	1	.600	70	55	L1
Dayton Triangles	4	4	1	.500	96	67	L1
Chicago Cardinals	3	3	2	.500	54	53	T1
Rochester Jeffersons	2	3	0	.400	85	76	W2
Cleveland Tigers	3	5	0	.375	95	58	L1
Washington Senators	1	2	0	.334	21	43	L1
Cincinnati Celts	1	3	0	.250	14	117	L2
Hammond Pros	1	3	1	.250	17	45	L2
Minneapolis Marines	1	3	0	.250	37	41	L1
Detroit Tigers	1	5	1	.167	19	109	L5
Columbus Panhandles	1	8	0	.111	47	222	W1
Tonawanda Kardex	0	1	0	.000	0	45	L1
Muncie Flyers	0	2	0	.000	0	28	L2
Louisville Brecks	0	2	0	.000	0	27	L2
New York Brickley Giants	0	2	0	.000	0	72	L2

Note: Tie games were not officially counted in the standings until 1972.

== Roster ==
The Nesser brothers were a core of the 1921 Columbus Panhandles team,

- Albert John Shook (March 12, 1899 – January 1, 1984) played guard for the team. He appeared in two games.
