= 1921 Detroit Tigers (NFL) season =

Sports season

1921 Detroit Tigers season
- Owner: Bill Marshall
- Head coach: Bill Marshall
- Home stadium: Navin Field

Results
- Record: 1–5–1 APFA (2–5–2 overall)
- League place: 16th APFA

The 1921 Detroit Tigers season was their second completed in the young American Professional Football Association (APFA), an organization soon to be renamed the National Football League. The team failed to improve on their previous output of 2–3–3 (when the team was still known as the Heralds), winning only one game.

== Schedule ==
Game	Date	Opponent	Result	Record	Venue	Attendance	Recap	Sources
1	October 2	at Rock Island Independents	T 0–0	0–0–1	Douglas Park	3,304	Recap	
2	October 9	Dayton Triangles	W 10–7	1–0–1	Navin Field	"good sized crowd"	Recap	
3	October 16	Akron Pros	L 0–20	1–1–1	Navin Field	6,000	Recap	
4	October 23	Rock Island Independents	L 0–14	1–2–1	Navin Field	3,000	Recap	
5	October 30	at Buffalo All-Americans	L 0–21	1–3–1	Canisius Villa	7,000	Recap	
6	November 6	at Chicago Staleys	L 9–20	1–4–1	Cubs Park	6,000	Recap	
—	November 11	at Bay City Independents	W 26–7	—	Clarkson Park	2,000	—	
7	November 13	at Dayton Triangles	L 0–27	1–5–1	Triangle Park		Recap	
—	November 20	Columbus Panhandles	(tentatively scheduled ahead of season)					
—	November 26	Detroit Maroons	Tigers unable to field complete team					
—	December 4	Detroit Maroons	T 0–0	—	Gridley Field		—	
Note: Games in italics indicate a non-league opponent.

== Standings ==
Newspaper ad promoting the 1921 season opener of the Tigers in Rock Island, Illinois, where they met the Independents.

APFA standings
	W	L	T	PCT	PF	PA	STK
Chicago Staleys	9	1	1	.900	128	53	T1
Buffalo All-Americans	9	1	2	.900	211	29	L1
Akron Pros	8	3	1	.727	148	31	W1
Canton Bulldogs	5	2	3	.714	106	55	W1
Rock Island Independents	4	2	1	.667	65	30	L1
Evansville Crimson Giants	3	2	0	.600	89	46	W1
Green Bay Packers	3	2	1	.600	70	55	L1
Dayton Triangles	4	4	1	.500	96	67	L1
Chicago Cardinals	3	3	2	.500	54	53	T1
Rochester Jeffersons	2	3	0	.400	85	76	W2
Cleveland Tigers	3	5	0	.375	95	58	L1
Washington Senators	1	2	0	.334	21	43	L1
Cincinnati Celts	1	3	0	.250	14	117	L2
Hammond Pros	1	3	1	.250	17	45	L2
Minneapolis Marines	1	3	0	.250	37	41	L1
Detroit Tigers	1	5	1	.167	19	109	L5
Columbus Panhandles	1	8	0	.111	47	222	W1
Tonawanda Kardex	0	1	0	.000	0	45	L1
Muncie Flyers	0	2	0	.000	0	28	L2
Louisville Brecks	0	2	0	.000	0	27	L2
New York Brickley Giants	0	2	0	.000	0	72	L2

Note: Tie games were not officially counted in the standings until 1972.

== Players ==
- Butch Brandau, kicker, 4 games, 192 pounds
- Charlie Carman, guard, 6 games, 215 pounds, 5-10, Vanderbilt
- Walt Clago, end, 6 games, 195 pounds, 6-0, Univ. of Detroit
- Frank Coughlin, tackle, 2 games, 220 pounds, 6-3, Notre Dame
- Neno DaPrato, fullback, 6 games, 185 pounds, 5-10, Michigan St.
- Cy DeGree, tackle, 7 games, 210 pounds, 6-1, Notre Dame
- Earl Dunn, 2 games, 182 pounds
- Moose Gardner, guard, 7 games, 220 pounds, 6-1, Wisconsin
- Buck Gavin, back, 3 games, 179 pounds, 5-10
- Charlie Guy, center, 7 games, 170 pounds, 6-0, Dartmouth, Washington & Jefferson
- Steamer Horning, tackle, 7 games, 198 pounds, 6-0, Colgate
- Earl Krieger, fullback, 5 games, 185 pounds, 5-11, Ohio
- Waddy Kuehl, back, 6 games, 165 pounds, 5-9, St. Ambrose, Dubuque
- Blake Miller, back, 3 games, 170 pounds, 5-7, Michigan St.
- Eddie Moegle, back, 4 games, 186 pounds, 5-9, Univ. of Detroit
- Norb Sacksteder, tailback, 7 games, 173 pounds, 5-9, Dayton, Christian Brothers (MO)
- Bill Stobbs, back, 7 games, 165 pounds, 5-7, Washington & Jefferson
- Don Straw, guard, 1 game, 210 pounds, 5-11, Washington & Jefferson
- Tillie Voss, end, 7 games, 207 pounds, 6-3, Univ. of Detroit
- Vic Whitmarsh, end 3 games, 190 pounds, 5-11, Syracuse
- Pryor Williams, guard, 3 games, 226 pounds, 6-1, Auburn, Vanderbilt
