= Butch Brandau =

American football player (1899–1987)

Profile
- Position: Fullback

Personal information
- Born: December 27, 1899; Detroit, Michigan
- Died: March 19, 1987 (aged 87); Detroit, Michigan
- Listed weight: 192 lb (87 kg)

Career information
- High school: Detroit Eastern

Career history
- Detroit Tigers (1921)
- Stats at Pro Football Reference

Edgar W. "Butch" Brandau (December 27, 1899 – March 19, 1987), sometimes erroneously listed as Arthur Frank Brandau, was an American football player who played one season in the National Football League with the Detroit Tigers. He appeared in four games for the Tigers during the 1921 season. In 1922, he played for the Kenyons, a semi-pro football team in Detroit. In the opening game of the 1922 season, he scored the only touchdown on a 45-yard punt return.

While attending Eastern High School in Detroit, Brandau gained acclaim both in football and swimming. In November 1917, the Detroit Free Press noted that he "tore off several twisting runs through a broken field, once getting away for a pretty sprint of over 40 yards." He also gained acclaim as a leading distance swimmer who attended national meets.
