= 1921 Dayton Triangles season =

Sports season

- Head coach: Bud Talbott
- Home stadium: Triangle Park

Results
- Record: 4–4–1
- League place: 8th APFA

The 1921 Dayton Triangles season was their second completed in the young American Professional Football Association (APFA), soon to be renamed the National Football League. The team finished the year with 4 wins, 4 losses, and 1 tie, putting them in eighth place among the league's 20 teams.

For 1921, Dayton attempted to expand its appeal by constructing a special children's section in the east end zone of Triangle Park. The segregated kids' bleachers had a special entrance and a reduced ticket price of 25 cents.

== Schedule ==
Game	Date	Opponent	Result	Record	Venue	Attendance	Recap	Sources
1	October 2	Columbus Panhandles	W 42–13	1–0	Triangle Park	"thousands"	Recap	
2	October 9	at Detroit Tigers	L 10–7	1–1	Navin Field	"good sized crowd"	Recap	
3	October 16	Canton Bulldogs	T 14–14	1–1–1	Triangle Park		Recap	
4	October 23	at Chicago Staleys	L 7–0	1–2–1	Cubs Park	7,000+	Recap	
5	October 30	Cleveland Tigers	W 3–2	2–2–1	Triangle Park	4,000	Recap	
6	November 6	at Canton Bulldogs	L 14–0	2–3–1	Lakeside Park		Recap	
7	November 13	Detroit Tigers	W 27–0	3–3–1	Triangle Park		Recap	
8	November 20	Akron Pros	W 3–0	4–3–1	Triangle Park		Recap	
9	November 27	at Buffalo All-Americans	L 7–0	4–4–1	Canisius Villa	3,500	Recap	

== Standings ==
APFA standings
	W	L	T	PCT	PF	PA	STK
Chicago Staleys	9	1	1	.900	128	53	T1
Buffalo All-Americans	9	1	2	.900	211	29	L1
Akron Pros	8	3	1	.727	148	31	W1
Canton Bulldogs	5	2	3	.714	106	55	W1
Rock Island Independents	4	2	1	.667	65	30	L1
Evansville Crimson Giants	3	2	0	.600	89	46	W1
Green Bay Packers	3	2	1	.600	70	55	L1
Dayton Triangles	4	4	1	.500	96	67	L1
Chicago Cardinals	3	3	2	.500	54	53	T1
Rochester Jeffersons	2	3	0	.400	85	76	W2
Cleveland Tigers	3	5	0	.375	95	58	L1
Washington Senators	1	2	0	.334	21	43	L1
Cincinnati Celts	1	3	0	.250	14	117	L2
Hammond Pros	1	3	1	.250	17	45	L2
Minneapolis Marines	1	3	0	.250	37	41	L1
Detroit Tigers	1	5	1	.167	19	109	L5
Columbus Panhandles	1	8	0	.111	47	222	W1
Tonawanda Kardex	0	1	0	.000	0	45	L1
Muncie Flyers	0	2	0	.000	0	28	L2
Louisville Brecks	0	2	0	.000	0	27	L2
New York Brickley Giants	0	2	0	.000	0	72	L2

Note: Tie games were not officially counted in the standings until 1972.
