= 1921 Cleveland Tigers season =

Sports season

- Owner: Jim O'Donnell
- Head coach: Jim Thorpe
- Home stadium: Dunn Field

Results
- Record: 3–5 APFA (3–5–1 overall)
- League place: 11th APFA

The 1921 Cleveland Tigers season was their second completed in the young American Professional Football Association (APFA), soon to be renamed the National Football League. The team improved on their previous record of 2–4–2, winning three games. They finished eleventh in the league.

The 1921 team, remembered by some as the Cleveland Indians, featured legendary player-coach Jim Thorpe at halfback and two other Native-American football stars in the backfield — "Indian Joe" Guyon and fullback Pete Calac, both of whom played with Thorpe on the 1920 Canton Bulldogs. In all, six members of the 1921 Cleveland Tigers team played on the Canton Bulldogs the previous season.

The 34-year old Thorpe — ancient in football years — used himself sparingly but was still effective enough that the Cleveland Plain Dealer could write good-naturedly of his season-opening performance against the Columbus Panhandles:

"Poor Jim Thorpe. He has become so old and decrepit that the best he could do yesterday was run eighty yards for a touchdown, shaking off half a dozen tacklers and dodging three or four others. His arm has become so weak he cannot throw the football more than forty or fifty yards in executing forward passes. Poor Jim. The first thing we know he will have to quit the game in ten years or so."

== Schedule ==
Tiny display advertisement promoting the first Cleveland Tigers game of the 1921 season.

Game	Date	Opponent	Result	Record	Venue	Attendance	Recap	Sources
1	October 16	Columbus Panhandles	W 35–9	1–0	Dunn Field	"several thousand"	Recap	
2	October 23	Cincinnati Celts	W 28–0	2–0	Dunn Field		Recap	
3	October 30	at Dayton Triangles	L 2–3	2–1	Triangle Park	4,000	Recap	
4	November 6	at Buffalo All-Americans	L 6–10	2–2	Canisius Villa	7,000	Recap	
5	November 13	Canton Bulldogs	L 0–7	2–3	Dunn Field	< 3,500	Recap	
6	November 20	at Chicago Staleys	L 7–22	2–4	Cubs Park	10,000	Recap	
–	November 27	(open date)		—			—	
7	December 3	at New York Brickley Giants	W 17–0	3–4	Polo Grounds	3,000	Recap	
–	December 10	at Richmond Athletic Club	T 0–0	—				
8	December 11	at Washington Senators	L 0–7	3–5	American League Park	5,000	Recap	
Note: Games in italics indicate a non-league opponent.

== Standings ==
Cleveland fullback Pete Calac gains ground through the Columbus line in the October 16 season-opener.

APFA standings
	W	L	T	PCT	PF	PA	STK
Chicago Staleys	9	1	1	.900	128	53	T1
Buffalo All-Americans	9	1	2	.900	211	29	L1
Akron Pros	8	3	1	.727	148	31	W1
Canton Bulldogs	5	2	3	.714	106	55	W1
Rock Island Independents	4	2	1	.667	65	30	L1
Evansville Crimson Giants	3	2	0	.600	89	46	W1
Green Bay Packers	3	2	1	.600	70	55	L1
Dayton Triangles	4	4	1	.500	96	67	L1
Chicago Cardinals	3	3	2	.500	54	53	T1
Rochester Jeffersons	2	3	0	.400	85	76	W2
Cleveland Tigers	3	5	0	.375	95	58	L1
Washington Senators	1	2	0	.334	21	43	L1
Cincinnati Celts	1	3	0	.250	14	117	L2
Hammond Pros	1	3	1	.250	17	45	L2
Minneapolis Marines	1	3	0	.250	37	41	L1
Detroit Tigers	1	5	1	.167	19	109	L5
Columbus Panhandles	1	8	0	.111	47	222	W1
Tonawanda Kardex	0	1	0	.000	0	45	L1
Muncie Flyers	0	2	0	.000	0	28	L2
Louisville Brecks	0	2	0	.000	0	27	L2
New York Brickley Giants	0	2	0	.000	0	72	L2

Note: Tie games were not officially counted in the standings until 1972.
