= 1921 Green Bay Packers season =

Sports season

- Head coach: Curly Lambeau
- Home stadium: Hagemeister Park

Results
- Record: 3–2–1 APFA (7–2–2 overall)
- League place: 7th APFA

The 1921 Green Bay Packers season was their third season of competition and their first in the American Professional Football Association, first iteration of the National Football League. The team finished with a 3–2–1 league record under player and coach Curly Lambeau, earning them a seventh-place finish.

After the season the Packers were removed from the league, following their acknowledgment of using Notre Dame players during the season, who played under assumed names. Green Bay would return to the NFL a year later as a "new franchise".

== Schedule ==
Game	Date	Opponent	Result	Record	Venue	Attendance	Recap	Sources
1	September 25	Chicago Boosters	W 13–6	—	Hagemeister Park	"comfortably filled stands"	—	
2	October 2	Rockford Olympics	W 49–0	—	Hagemeister Park		—	
3	October 9	Chicago Cornell-Hamburgs	W 40–0	—	Hagemeister Park	"small-sized crowd"	—	
4	October 16	Beloit Fairies	W 7–0	—	Hagemeister Park	"biggest crowd of season"	—	
5	October 23	Minneapolis Marines	W 7–6	1–0	Hagemeister Park	6,000	Recap	
6	October 30	Rock Island Independents	L 3–13	1–1	Hagemeister Park	6,000	Recap	
7	November 6	Evansville Crimson Giants	W 43–6	2-1	Hagemeister Park	"smallest crowd of season"	Recap	
8	November 13	Hammond Pros	W 14–7	3–1	Hagemeister Park	"small-sized crowd"	Recap	
9	November 20	at Chicago Cardinals	T 3–3	3–1–1	Normal Park	2,000	Recap	
10	November 27	at Chicago Staleys	L 0–20	3–2–1	Cubs Park	7,000	Recap	
11	December 4	Racine Legion	T 3–3	—	Milwaukee Ball Park	"biggest crowd in city"	—	
Note: Games in italics indicate a non-league opponent.

== Standings ==
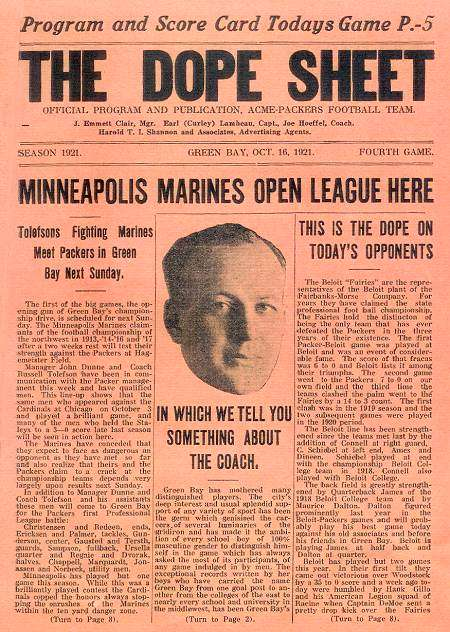
Cover of The Dope Sheet, a Packer newsletter and program produced by Green Bay Press-Express sportswriter George Whitney Calhoun.

APFA standings
	W	L	T	PCT	PF	PA	STK
Chicago Staleys	9	1	1	.900	128	53	T1
Buffalo All-Americans	9	1	2	.900	211	29	L1
Akron Pros	8	3	1	.727	148	31	W1
Canton Bulldogs	5	2	3	.714	106	55	W1
Rock Island Independents	4	2	1	.667	65	30	L1
Evansville Crimson Giants	3	2	0	.600	89	46	W1
Green Bay Packers	3	2	1	.600	70	55	L1
Dayton Triangles	4	4	1	.500	96	67	L1
Chicago Cardinals	3	3	2	.500	54	53	T1
Rochester Jeffersons	2	3	0	.400	85	76	W2
Cleveland Tigers	3	5	0	.375	95	58	L1
Washington Senators	1	2	0	.334	21	43	L1
Cincinnati Celts	1	3	0	.250	14	117	L2
Hammond Pros	1	3	1	.250	17	45	L2
Minneapolis Marines	1	3	0	.250	37	41	L1
Detroit Tigers	1	5	1	.167	19	109	L5
Columbus Panhandles	1	8	0	.111	47	222	W1
Tonawanda Kardex	0	1	0	.000	0	45	L1
Muncie Flyers	0	2	0	.000	0	28	L2
Louisville Brecks	0	2	0	.000	0	27	L2
New York Brickley Giants	0	2	0	.000	0	72	L2

Note: Tie games were not officially counted in the standings until 1972.

== Roster ==
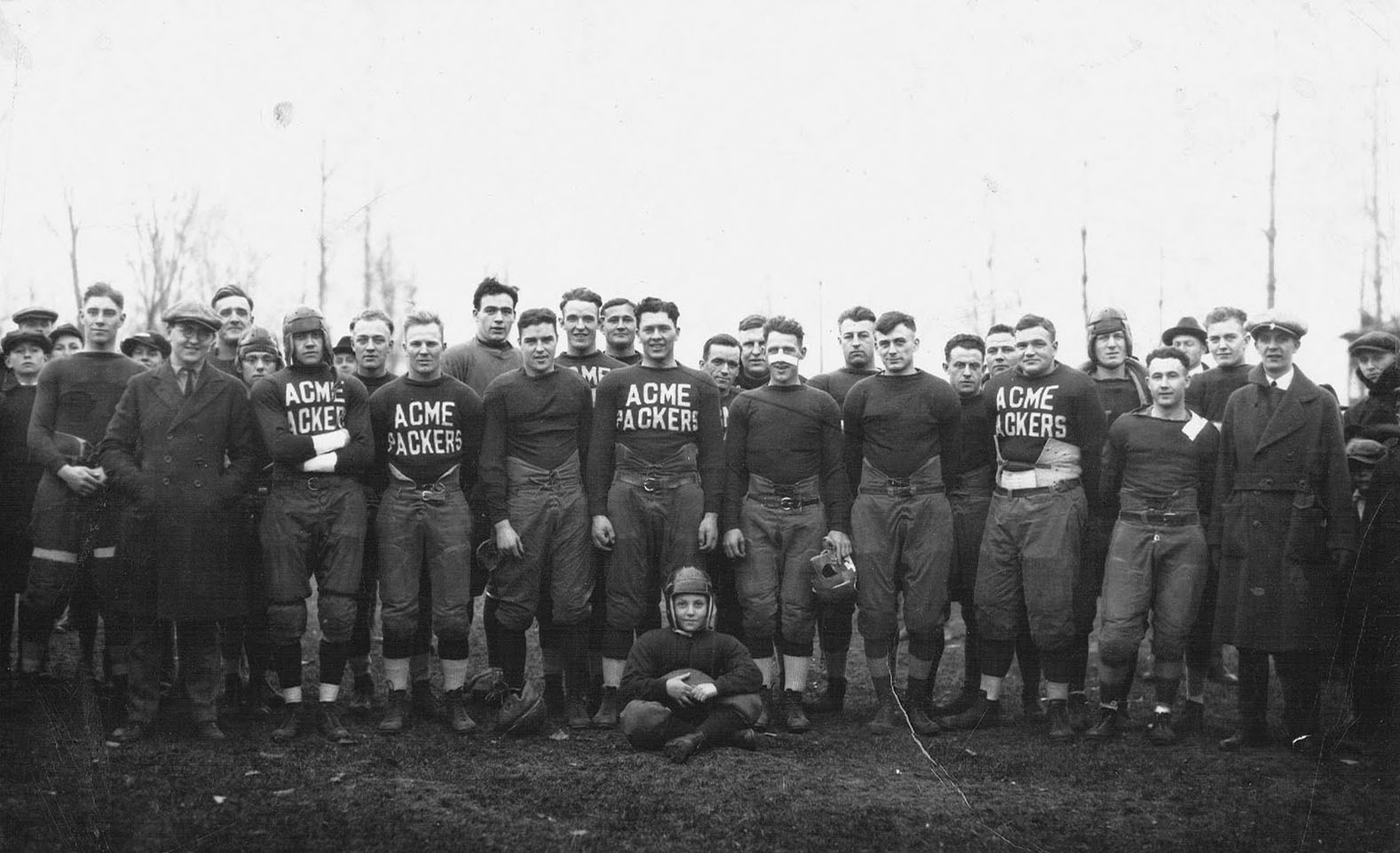
Team photo of the 1921 Green Bay Packers.

1921 Green Bay Packers roster
-- Buff Wagner B; -- Adolph Kliebhan B; -- Art Schmaehl FB; -- Grover Malone HB; -- Curly Lambeau TB; -- Tubby Howard HB; -- Billy DuMoe LE; -- Dave Hayes RE; -- Emmett Keefe E	-- Herman Martell E; -- Cowboy Wheeler E; -- Joe Carey LG; -- Martin Zoll LG; -- Sammy Powers G; -- Warren Smith G; -- Cub Buck RT; -- Milt Wilson RG; -- Jab Murray C; -- Fee Klaus C; -- Norm Barry K
