= 1921 Canton Bulldogs season =

Sports season

- Owner: Ralph Hay
- Head coach: Cap Edwards
- Home stadium: Lakeside Park

Results
- Record: 5–2–3 APFA (8–3–3 overall)
- League place: 4th APFA

The 1921 Canton Bulldogs season was their second completed in the young American Professional Football Association (APFA). The team improved on their previous output of 7–4–2, losing only two NFL games. They finished fourth in the league.

The 1921 team was sometimes referred to as the Canton Indians in the contemporary press.

== Schedule ==
| Game | Date | Opponent | Result | Record | Venue | Attendance | Recap | Sources |
|---|---|---|---|---|---|---|---|---|
| – | October 2 | Massillon Blues | W 48–0 | — | Lakeside Park | | — | |
| 1 | October 9 | Hammond Pros | T 7–7 | 0–0–1 | Lakeside Park | | Recap | |
| 2 | October 16 | at Dayton Triangles | T 14–14 | 0–0–2 | Triangle Park | | Recap | |
| 3 | October 23 | Akron Pros | L 0–3 | 0–1–2 | Lakeside Park | 8,000 | Recap | |
| — | October 30 | at Chicago Staleys | canceled due to heavy rain | | | | | |
| 4 | November 6 | Dayton Triangles | W 14–0 | 1–1–2 | Lakeside Park | | Recap | |
| — | November 11 | at Chicago Cardinals | cancelled due to unplayable muddy field | | | | | |
| 5 | November 13 | at Cleveland Tigers | W 7–0 | 2–1–2 | Dunn Field | < 3,500 | Recap | |
| 6 | November 20 | at Buffalo All-Americans | T 7–7 | 2–1–3 | Canisius Villa | | Recap | |
| 7 | November 24 | at Akron Pros | W 14–0 | 3–1–3 | League Park | | Recap | |
| 8 | November 27 | at Washington Senators | W 15–0 | 4–1–3 | American League Park | 4,000 | Recap | |
| – | December 3 | at Union Quakers of Philadelphia | W 14–9 | — | | | — | |
| 9 | December 11 | at Chicago Staleys | L 0–10 | 4–2–3 | Cubs Field | 3,000 | Recap | |
| – | December 15 | at Chicago Morris Supremes | W 19–0 | — | | | — | |
| – | December 17 | at Union Quakers of Philadelphia | L 0–34 | — | | | — | |
| 10 | December 18 | at Washington Senators | W 28–14 | 5–2–3 | American League Park | 6,000 | Recap | |
Note: Games in italics are non-league opponents. Armistice Day: November 11. Thanksgiving Day: November 24.

== Standings ==
APFA standings
| | W | L | T | PCT | PF | PA | STK |
|---|---|---|---|---|---|---|---|
| Chicago Staleys | 9 | 1 | 1 | .900 | 128 | 53 | T1 |
| Buffalo All-Americans | 9 | 1 | 2 | .900 | 211 | 29 | L1 |
| Akron Pros | 8 | 3 | 1 | .727 | 148 | 31 | W1 |
| Canton Bulldogs | 5 | 2 | 3 | .714 | 106 | 55 | W1 |
| Rock Island Independents | 4 | 2 | 1 | .667 | 65 | 30 | L1 |
| Evansville Crimson Giants | 3 | 2 | 0 | .600 | 89 | 46 | W1 |
| Green Bay Packers | 3 | 2 | 1 | .600 | 70 | 55 | L1 |
| Dayton Triangles | 4 | 4 | 1 | .500 | 96 | 67 | L1 |
| Chicago Cardinals | 3 | 3 | 2 | .500 | 54 | 53 | T1 |
| Rochester Jeffersons | 2 | 3 | 0 | .400 | 85 | 76 | W2 |
| Cleveland Tigers | 3 | 5 | 0 | .375 | 95 | 58 | L1 |
| Washington Senators | 1 | 2 | 0 | .334 | 21 | 43 | L1 |
| Cincinnati Celts | 1 | 3 | 0 | .250 | 14 | 117 | L2 |
| Hammond Pros | 1 | 3 | 1 | .250 | 17 | 45 | L2 |
| Minneapolis Marines | 1 | 3 | 0 | .250 | 37 | 41 | L1 |
| Detroit Tigers | 1 | 5 | 1 | .167 | 19 | 109 | L5 |
| Columbus Panhandles | 1 | 8 | 0 | .111 | 47 | 222 | W1 |
| Tonawanda Kardex | 0 | 1 | 0 | .000 | 0 | 45 | L1 |
| Muncie Flyers | 0 | 2 | 0 | .000 | 0 | 28 | L2 |
| Louisville Brecks | 0 | 2 | 0 | .000 | 0 | 27 | L2 |
| New York Brickley Giants | 0 | 2 | 0 | .000 | 0 | 72 | L2 |

Note: Tie games were not officially counted in the standings until 1972.

== Roster ==
Although the year 1920 is indicated in the caption of this photo from the first Hall of Fame game program, this is probably the 1921 iteration of the Canton Bulldogs team.
