= 1921 Rochester Jeffersons season =

Sports season

- Head coach: Jack Forsyth
- Home stadium: Baseball Park (Rochester)

Results
- Record: 2–3 APFA (4–3–1 overall)
- League place: 10th in APFA

The 1921 Rochester Jeffersons season was their second completed in the young American Professional Football Association (APFA), soon to be renamed the National Football League. The team failed to improve on their previous record against league teams of 6–3–2, winning only two games. They finished tenth in the league. The Union Quakers were able to arrange a game with Rochester to make up for the loss of a game between the Quakers and the Canton Bulldogs. The Jeffersons played the Quakers to a 3–3 tie. Since the Jeffs were losing large amounts of money during the 1921 season and needed the revenue from the Union Quakers game, the APFA decided to not interfere.

== Schedule ==
| Week | Date | Opponent | Result | Record | Venue | Attendance | Recap | Sources |
|---|---|---|---|---|---|---|---|---|
| – | October 9 | All-Buffalo | W 41–0 | — | Exposition Park | "good-sized crowd" | — | |
| 1 | October 16 | at Chicago Staleys | L 13–16 | 0–1 | Cubs Park | 8,000 | Recap | |
| 2 | October 23 | at Buffalo All-Americans | L 0–28 | 0–2 | Canisius Villa | 10,000 | Recap | |
| 3 | October 30 | at Akron Pros | L 0–19 | 0–3 | League Park | 4,000 | Recap | |
| 4 | November 6 | Tonawanda Kardex | W 45–0 | 1–3 | Baseball Park | 3,000 | Recap | |
| – | November 19 | at Philadelphia Union Quakers | T 3–3 | — | National League Park | 8,000 | — | |
| 5 | November 20 | Columbus Panhandles | W 27–13 | 2–3 | Baseball Park | 2,500 | Recap | |
| – | November 27 | Syracuse Pros | W 12–0 | — | Baseball Park | "small crowd" | — | |
Note: Games in italics indicate a non-league opponent. November 19: Saturday.

== Standings ==
APFA standings
| | W | L | T | PCT | PF | PA | STK |
|---|---|---|---|---|---|---|---|
| Chicago Staleys | 9 | 1 | 1 | .900 | 128 | 53 | T1 |
| Buffalo All-Americans | 9 | 1 | 2 | .900 | 211 | 29 | L1 |
| Akron Pros | 8 | 3 | 1 | .727 | 148 | 31 | W1 |
| Canton Bulldogs | 5 | 2 | 3 | .714 | 106 | 55 | W1 |
| Rock Island Independents | 4 | 2 | 1 | .667 | 65 | 30 | L1 |
| Evansville Crimson Giants | 3 | 2 | 0 | .600 | 89 | 46 | W1 |
| Green Bay Packers | 3 | 2 | 1 | .600 | 70 | 55 | L1 |
| Dayton Triangles | 4 | 4 | 1 | .500 | 96 | 67 | L1 |
| Chicago Cardinals | 3 | 3 | 2 | .500 | 54 | 53 | T1 |
| Rochester Jeffersons | 2 | 3 | 0 | .400 | 85 | 76 | W2 |
| Cleveland Tigers | 3 | 5 | 0 | .375 | 95 | 58 | L1 |
| Washington Senators | 1 | 2 | 0 | .334 | 21 | 43 | L1 |
| Cincinnati Celts | 1 | 3 | 0 | .250 | 14 | 117 | L2 |
| Hammond Pros | 1 | 3 | 1 | .250 | 17 | 45 | L2 |
| Minneapolis Marines | 1 | 3 | 0 | .250 | 37 | 41 | L1 |
| Detroit Tigers | 1 | 5 | 1 | .167 | 19 | 109 | L5 |
| Columbus Panhandles | 1 | 8 | 0 | .111 | 47 | 222 | W1 |
| Tonawanda Kardex | 0 | 1 | 0 | .000 | 0 | 45 | L1 |
| Muncie Flyers | 0 | 2 | 0 | .000 | 0 | 28 | L2 |
| Louisville Brecks | 0 | 2 | 0 | .000 | 0 | 27 | L2 |
| New York Brickley Giants | 0 | 2 | 0 | .000 | 0 | 72 | L2 |

Note: Tie games were not officially counted in the standings until 1972.
