= Rube Marquardt =

American football player (1894–1973)

No. 14
- Position: End

Personal information
- Born: March 7, 1894; Evanston, Illinois, U.S.
- Died: February 15, 1973 (aged 74); Fort Lauderdale, Florida, U.S.
- Listed height: 5 ft 9 in (1.75 m)
- Listed weight: 155 lb (70 kg)

Career information
- College: Northwestern

Career history
- Chicago Cardinals (1921)

Career statistics
- Games played: 3
- Receiving TDs: 1
- Stats at Pro Football Reference

Rube Marquardt (March 7, 1894 – February 15, 1973) was an American football end who played one season for the Chicago Cardinals of the American Professional Football Association (APFA). He played college football at Northwestern University.
