= 1921 Tonawanda Kardex season =

Sports season

- Head coach: Tam Rose
- Home stadium: Traveling team

Results
- Record: 0–1–1 overall 0–1 in APFA
- League place: T–18th in APFA

The 1921 Tonawanda Kardex season was their sole season in the young American Professional Football Association (APFA), in which they played only one league game. The team finished 0–1 in league play, and tied for eighteenth place in the league.

== Schedule ==
| Game | Date | Opponent | Result | Record | Venue | Attendance | Recap | Sources |
|---|---|---|---|---|---|---|---|---|
| – | October 9 | at Syracuse Pros | T 0–0 | — | New Star Park | 1,500 | — | |
| – | October 31 | at Rochester Scalpers | canceled | | | | | |
| 1 | November 6 | at Rochester Jeffersons | L 0–45 | 0–1 | Baseball Park | 3,000 | Recap | |
Note: Games in italics indicate a non-league opponent. Thanksgiving Day: November 24.

== Standings ==
APFA standings
| | W | L | T | PCT | PF | PA | STK |
|---|---|---|---|---|---|---|---|
| Chicago Staleys | 9 | 1 | 1 | .900 | 128 | 53 | T1 |
| Buffalo All-Americans | 9 | 1 | 2 | .900 | 211 | 29 | L1 |
| Akron Pros | 8 | 3 | 1 | .727 | 148 | 31 | W1 |
| Canton Bulldogs | 5 | 2 | 3 | .714 | 106 | 55 | W1 |
| Rock Island Independents | 4 | 2 | 1 | .667 | 65 | 30 | L1 |
| Evansville Crimson Giants | 3 | 2 | 0 | .600 | 89 | 46 | W1 |
| Green Bay Packers | 3 | 2 | 1 | .600 | 70 | 55 | L1 |
| Dayton Triangles | 4 | 4 | 1 | .500 | 96 | 67 | L1 |
| Chicago Cardinals | 3 | 3 | 2 | .500 | 54 | 53 | T1 |
| Rochester Jeffersons | 2 | 3 | 0 | .400 | 85 | 76 | W2 |
| Cleveland Tigers | 3 | 5 | 0 | .375 | 95 | 58 | L1 |
| Washington Senators | 1 | 2 | 0 | .334 | 21 | 43 | L1 |
| Cincinnati Celts | 1 | 3 | 0 | .250 | 14 | 117 | L2 |
| Hammond Pros | 1 | 3 | 1 | .250 | 17 | 45 | L2 |
| Minneapolis Marines | 1 | 3 | 0 | .250 | 37 | 41 | L1 |
| Detroit Tigers | 1 | 5 | 1 | .167 | 19 | 109 | L5 |
| Columbus Panhandles | 1 | 8 | 0 | .111 | 47 | 222 | W1 |
| Tonawanda Kardex | 0 | 1 | 0 | .000 | 0 | 45 | L1 |
| Muncie Flyers | 0 | 2 | 0 | .000 | 0 | 28 | L2 |
| Louisville Brecks | 0 | 2 | 0 | .000 | 0 | 27 | L2 |
| New York Brickley Giants | 0 | 2 | 0 | .000 | 0 | 72 | L2 |

Note: Tie games were not officially counted in the standings until 1972.
