= Leo Chappell =

American football player (1896–1954)

Profile
- Position: Guard

Personal information
- Born: August 6, 1896; Parma, Michigan, U.S.
- Died: June 22, 1954 (aged 57); Parma, Michigan, U.S.
- Listed height: 6 ft 2 in (1.88 m)
- Listed weight: 205 lb (93 kg)

Career information
- College: none

Career history
- Chicago Cardinals (1920–1921)

Career statistics
- Games played: 9
- Games started: 6
- Stats at Pro Football Reference

Hobart James Chapel (August 6, 1896 – June 22, 1954) was an American football guard who played one season for the Chicago Cardinals of the American Professional Football Association (APFA). He played under the name of "Leo Chappell".
