= 1921 Washington Senators (NFL) season =

Sports season

1921 Washington Senators season
- Head coach: Jack Hegarty
- Home stadium: American League Park; National Park 4 Games

Results
- Record: 1–2 in APFA (8–6 overall)
- League place: 12th in APFA

The 1921 Washington Senators season was their inaugural and only season in the young American Professional Football Association (APFA). The team finished 1–2, finishing in twelfth place in the league.

== Schedule ==
Game	Date	Opponent	Result	Record	Venue	Attendance	Recap	Sources
—	October 9	Wilmington Collegians	W 33–0	—			—	
—	October 16	All-Lancaster A.C.	W 33–7	—			—	
—	October 23	Holmesburg Athletic Club	L 0–10	—			—	
—	October 30	Richmond A.C.	W 10–0	—			—	
—	November 6	at Norfolk, Virginia	W 61–0	—			—	
—	November 11	at Richmond A.C.	L 0–7	—			—	
—	November 13	Syracuse Pros	W 20–7	—	American League Park		—	
—	November 20	Clarksburg, Maryland	W 16–7	—			—	
1	November 27	Canton Bulldogs	L 0–15	0–1	American League Park	4,000	Recap	
—	December 10	Baltimore Pros	L 3–10	—			—	
2	December 11	Cleveland Tigers	W 7–0	1–1	American League Park	5,000	Recap	
—	December 11	at Richmond A.C.	L 0–41	—			—	
3	December 18	Canton Bulldogs	L 14–28	1–2	American League Park	6,000	Recap	
—	December 18	Washington All-Stars	W 16–7	—			—	
Note: Non-APFA opponents in italics. Thanksgiving Day: November 24.

== Standings ==
APFA standings
	W	L	T	PCT	PF	PA	STK
Chicago Staleys	9	1	1	.900	128	53	T1
Buffalo All-Americans	9	1	2	.900	211	29	L1
Akron Pros	8	3	1	.727	148	31	W1
Canton Bulldogs	5	2	3	.714	106	55	W1
Rock Island Independents	4	2	1	.667	65	30	L1
Evansville Crimson Giants	3	2	0	.600	89	46	W1
Green Bay Packers	3	2	1	.600	70	55	L1
Dayton Triangles	4	4	1	.500	96	67	L1
Chicago Cardinals	3	3	2	.500	54	53	T1
Rochester Jeffersons	2	3	0	.400	85	76	W2
Cleveland Tigers	3	5	0	.375	95	58	L1
Washington Senators	1	2	0	.334	21	43	L1
Cincinnati Celts	1	3	0	.250	14	117	L2
Hammond Pros	1	3	1	.250	17	45	L2
Minneapolis Marines	1	3	0	.250	37	41	L1
Detroit Tigers	1	5	1	.167	19	109	L5
Columbus Panhandles	1	8	0	.111	47	222	W1
Tonawanda Kardex	0	1	0	.000	0	45	L1
Muncie Flyers	0	2	0	.000	0	28	L2
Louisville Brecks	0	2	0	.000	0	27	L2
New York Brickley Giants	0	2	0	.000	0	72	L2

Note: Tie games were not officially counted in the standings until 1972.
