= 1921 APFA season =

American football season

1921 NFL season
Regular season
- Duration: September 25 – December 18, 1921
- Champions: Chicago Staleys

APFA teams

The 1921 APFA season was the second season of the American Professional Football Association (APFA), which was renamed the National Football League in 1922.

The Staleys, who moved their base of operations from Decatur, Illinois, to Chicago mid-season, were named the APFA Champions over the Buffalo All-Americans.

== Background ==
=== League meeting ===
At a league meeting in Akron, Ohio on April 30 prior to the season, the Association was reorganized, with Joe Carr of the Columbus Panhandles named as president. The Association's headquarters was moved to Columbus, Ohio, and a league constitution and by-laws were drafted, giving teams territorial rights, restricting player movements, and developing membership criteria for the franchises.

Representatives from ten professional football teams were in attendance at Akron, with an additional 14 clubs sending word that they wished to become a member of the circuit for 1921. Those in attendance included Morgan O'Brien of Decatur, Chris O'Brien of Chicago, Alva "Doc" Young of Hammond, Ralph Hay and Carl Storck of Canton, Joe F. Carr of Columbus, Art Ranney of Akron, Leo Lyons of Buffalo, and Leo Conway of Philadelphia.

The gathering determined that the league would play under the rules of college football. Official standings were to be issued for the first time so that there would be a clear champion, with only games played against league teams counting toward the standings.

The league's teams adopted a salary cap of $1,800 per game. Rules were adopted prohibiting players from jumping from one team to another.

Officers were elected, with Joe Carr of the Panhandles elected as president; Morgan O'Brien, vice-president; and Carl Storck, secretary-treasurer. A three-member committee was also appointed to overhaul the association's constitution, with changes to be presented at the next scheduled league meeting, to be held June 18 in Cleveland.

The 1920 World's Championship was awarded to the Akron Indians, who were presented with a silver loving cup in recognition of their achievement.

=== Changes in roster rules ===
The 1921 season saw several significant revisions of the rules governing team rosters. The raiding of college rosters — a source of great conflict — was henceforth prohibited. Any team making use of a player who had not "completed his school course" was to be expelled from the association, it was determined. Closely related to this, the use of assumed playing names to disguise real life identity was banned unless the player first received special permission from the association's executive committee.

Players were to be bound by their contracts for the duration of the season, with no player free to sign with another club mid-season without having been formally released by their first team. The loaning of players from one club to another for late season games was to be carefully regulated by the executive committee, with the loaned player to be used in place of an injured player to maintain team integrity rather than to be appended to the roster to build competitive superiority.

=== League planning intuited ===
The 1921 season was seen as a year of transition by Frank G. Menke, a sportswriter of national renown with the Hearst newspapers. Declaring that "professional football becomes an established organization this fall," Menke noted that APFA owners had maintained a steady focus on the Midwest and Western New York, with "no cities along the Atlantic seaboard...represented in the circuit."

"It is the plan of the American Professional Football Association to have two separate leagues operating in 1922," Menke confidently predicted, "one composed of Eastern cities and the other of towns in the Middle West. The banner gridiron clash of the year will come when a sort of "World Series" will be played between the champion teams of the East and West."

It would be another difficult decade before anything like this bifurcated league would come into existence. New APFA president Joseph Carr was extensively quoted in the same article by Menke and would seem likely to have been the source of this "12 month plan" for the association.

=== Easy come, easy go... ===
The APFA began its existence with universalist intention, with the Akron delegates voting to seek the affiliation of "every professional football club in the country," according to a press report of the day. Entry into the league was therefore largely unrestricted and franchise fees inexpensive.

With its "come one, come all" policy, the APFA boomed from 14 to 21 teams for 1921, but many of these newcomers entered on the financial precipice and shortly exited having fallen over it. The Kardex of Tonawanda, New York, managed to play only one league game and the Muncie Flyers managed two before abruptly terminating. Charlie Brickley's first iteration of the New York Giants managed two APFA games (both shutout losses) amidst a year of non-league games and cancellations before folding the tent.

The Detroit Tigers, formerly known as the Heralds, folded mid-season, with its stars absorbed by the Buffalo All-Americans. Cellar-dwelling squads from Cincinnati and Washington were shortly out of the league as well, as was the league's more established Cleveland franchise.

== Teams ==
First season in APFA	First and only season in NFL
Team folded this season

Team	Head coach (Games)	Venue (Games)
Akron Pros	Fritz Pollard and Elgie Tobin	Akron League Park
Buffalo All-Americans	Tommy Hughitt	Canisius Villa (10), Buffalo Baseball Park (1)
Canton Bulldogs	Cap Edwards	League Field
Chicago Cardinals	Paddy Driscoll	Normal Park
Chicago Staleys	George Halas	Staley Field (Decatur, 2), Cubs Park (Chicago, 10)
Cincinnati Celts	Mel Doherty	Traveling team
Cleveland Tigers	Jim Thorpe	Dunn Field
Columbus Panhandles	Ted Nesser	Neil Park
Dayton Triangles	Bud Talbott	Triangle Park
Detroit Tigers	Billy Marshall	Navin Field
Evansville Crimson Giants	Frank Fausch	Bosse Field
Green Bay Packers	Curly Lambeau	Hagemeister Park
Hammond Pros	Max Hicks	Traveling team
Louisville Brecks	Austin Higgins	Eclipse Park
Minneapolis Marines	Rube Ursella	Nicollet Park
Muncie Flyers	Cooney Checkaye	Walnut Street Park
New York Brickley Giants	Charlie Brickley	Commercial Field (2), Ebbets Field (1), Polo Grounds (1)
Rochester Jeffersons	Jack Forsyth	Exposition Park (1), Bay Street Ball Grounds (3)
Rock Island Independents	Frank Coughlin (2), Jimmy Conzelman (5)	Douglas Park
Tonawanda Kardex	Tam Rose	Traveling team
Washington Senators	Jack Hegarty	American League Park

== Standings ==
APFA standings
	W	L	T	PCT	PF	PA	STK
Chicago Staleys	9	1	1	.900	128	53	T1
Buffalo All-Americans	9	1	2	.900	211	29	L1
Akron Pros	8	3	1	.727	148	31	W1
Canton Bulldogs	5	2	3	.714	106	55	W1
Rock Island Independents	4	2	1	.667	65	30	L1
Evansville Crimson Giants	3	2	0	.600	89	46	W1
Green Bay Packers	3	2	1	.600	70	55	L1
Dayton Triangles	4	4	1	.500	96	67	L1
Chicago Cardinals	3	3	2	.500	54	53	T1
Rochester Jeffersons	2	3	0	.400	85	76	W2
Cleveland Tigers	3	5	0	.375	95	58	L1
Washington Senators	1	2	0	.334	21	43	L1
Cincinnati Celts	1	3	0	.250	14	117	L2
Hammond Pros	1	3	1	.250	17	45	L2
Minneapolis Marines	1	3	0	.250	37	41	L1
Detroit Tigers	1	5	1	.167	19	109	L5
Columbus Panhandles	1	8	0	.111	47	222	W1
Tonawanda Kardex	0	1	0	.000	0	45	L1
Muncie Flyers	0	2	0	.000	0	28	L2
Louisville Brecks	0	2	0	.000	0	27	L2
New York Brickley Giants	0	2	0	.000	0	72	L2

Note: Tie games were not officially counted in the standings until 1972.

== De facto championship game ==
1921 de facto championship
Buffalo All-Americans (9–1–2)	Chicago Staleys (9–1–1)
7	10
Head coach: Tommy Hughitt	Head coach: George Halas
	1	2	3	4	Total
BUF	0	0	7	0	7
CHI	7	0	3	0	10
- Date: December 4, 1921
- Stadium: Cubs Park; Chicago, Illinois

The Chicago Staleys (to be renamed the Chicago Bears after the end of the season), led by wide receiver George Halas, and the Buffalo All-Americans, led by quarterback Tommy Hughitt, were the two top teams in the league; each playing all of their games at home, Buffalo and Chicago amassed 6–0 records in league play. On Thanksgiving 1921, Buffalo played one of its only road games of the season, in Chicago, and prevailed 7–6. Chicago demanded a rematch.

The All-Americans agreed to rematch the Staleys on December 4, again in Chicago, on the condition that the game would be considered a "post-season" exhibition game not to be counted in the standings; had it not, Buffalo would have had an undefeated season and won the title. (Buffalo had played, and defeated, the Akron Pros just one day prior.) This was a fairly common custom of the time; both New York and Ohio's pre-NFL circuits put their marquee games on Thanksgiving weekend and cleaned up with mostly token opposition in the following weeks.

Chicago defeated Buffalo in the rematch by a score of 10–7. Halas responded that the second game was played on December 4 (well before teams in Illinois typically stopped playing games in those days), and the Staleys played two more games against top opponents, the Canton Bulldogs and Racine Cardinals after the second Buffalo game (though, at the time of the Buffalo-Chicago matchup, Chicago had played three fewer games than Buffalo).

The league counted the All-Americans game in the standings, against Buffalo's wishes, resulting in Buffalo (9–1–2) and Chicago (9–1–1) being tied atop the standings. The league then implemented the first ever tiebreaker: a rule, now considered archaic and removed from league rulebooks, that stated if two teams played multiple times in a season, the last game between the two teams carried more weight. Thus, the Chicago victory actually counted more in the standings, giving Chicago the championship. Buffalo sports fans have been known to refer to this, justly or unjustly, as the "Staley Swindle," and have cited it as the first evidence of a sports curse on the city.

Had the current (post-1972) system of counting ties as half a win and half a loss been in place in 1921, the Staleys would have won the championship with a win percentage of .864, while the All-Americans would have finished second with .833. If the above game was excluded as per Buffalo's wishes, the All-Americans would have won with .909, and the Staleys would have finished second with .850.

=== Packers suspension ===
After the season, the Green Bay Packers were suspended following their admission to using Notre Dame players playing under assumed names during the season. Green Bay would return to the NFL a year later with a new franchise led by Curly Lambeau.
