= 1921 New York Brickley Giants season =

Sports season

- Head coach: Charlie Brickley
- Home stadium: Commercial Field (2 games); Ebbets Field (1 game); Polo Grounds (1 game)

Results
- Record: 0–2 APFA (5–3 overall)
- League place: 18th in APFA

The 1921 New York Brickley Giants season was their sole season in the young American Professional Football Association (APFA). The team finished the season with a 0–2 league record, and tied for last place in the league. Overall, the team posted a 5–3 record, when taking non-league games into account. The team is also referred to as the Brooklyn Giants in contemporary advertising.

== Schedule ==
Game	Date	Opponent	Result	Record	Venue	Attendance	Recap	Sources
—	October 9	at New Haven Williams	W 3–2	—			—	
1	October 16	at Buffalo All-Americans	L 0–55	0–1	Canisius Villa	7,500	Recap	
—	October 23	at Bridgeport, Connecticut	L 0–7	—			—	
—	November 5	at Union Quakers of Philadelphia	W 3–0	—			—	
—	November 6	Brooklyn All-Star Collegians	W 27–6	—	Commercial Field		—	
—	November 8	Union Quakers of Philadelphia	Canceled					
—	November 13	Governors Island	W 45–0	—	Commercial Field		—	
—	November 20	Brooklyn Harway A.A.	W 17–0	—	Ebbets Field		—	
—	November 26	at Orange Athletic Club	Canceled					
—	November 27	Union Quakers of Philadelphia	Canceled					
2	December 3	Cleveland Tigers	L 0–17	0–2	Polo Grounds	3,000	Recap	
—	December 11	Brooklyn Harway A.A.	Canceled					
Note: Games in italics indicate a non-league opponent.

== Standings ==
APFA standings
	W	L	T	PCT	PF	PA	STK
Chicago Staleys	9	1	1	.900	128	53	T1
Buffalo All-Americans	9	1	2	.900	211	29	L1
Akron Pros	8	3	1	.727	148	31	W1
Canton Bulldogs	5	2	3	.714	106	55	W1
Rock Island Independents	4	2	1	.667	65	30	L1
Evansville Crimson Giants	3	2	0	.600	89	46	W1
Green Bay Packers	3	2	1	.600	70	55	L1
Dayton Triangles	4	4	1	.500	96	67	L1
Chicago Cardinals	3	3	2	.500	54	53	T1
Rochester Jeffersons	2	3	0	.400	85	76	W2
Cleveland Tigers	3	5	0	.375	95	58	L1
Washington Senators	1	2	0	.334	21	43	L1
Cincinnati Celts	1	3	0	.250	14	117	L2
Hammond Pros	1	3	1	.250	17	45	L2
Minneapolis Marines	1	3	0	.250	37	41	L1
Detroit Tigers	1	5	1	.167	19	109	L5
Columbus Panhandles	1	8	0	.111	47	222	W1
Tonawanda Kardex	0	1	0	.000	0	45	L1
Muncie Flyers	0	2	0	.000	0	28	L2
Louisville Brecks	0	2	0	.000	0	27	L2
New York Brickley Giants	0	2	0	.000	0	72	L2

Note: Tie games were not officially counted in the standings until 1972.
