= 1921 Cincinnati Celts season =

Sports season

- Head coach: Mel Doherty
- Home stadium: Traveling team

Results
- Record: 1–3 APFA (3–3 overall)
- League place: T-13th APFA

The 1921 Cincinnati Celts season was their sole season in the young American Professional Football Association (APFA). The team finished 1–3, and tied for thirteenth place in the league.

== Schedule ==
Game	Date	Opponent	Result	Record	Venue	Attendance	Recap	Sources
1	October 2	at Akron Pros	L 0–41	0–1	League Park	2,500	Recap	
2	October 16	at Muncie Flyers	W 14–0	1–1	Walnut Street Park		Recap	
3	October 23	at Cleveland Tigers	L 0–28	1–2	Dunn Field		Recap	
—	November 6	at Fort Wayne Pros	W 13–0	—			—	
—	November 20	at Middletown Miamis	W 21–14	—			—	
4	November 27	at Evansville Crimson Giants	L 0–48	1–3	Bosse Field		Recap	
Note: Non-APFA opponents in italics.

== Standings ==
APFA standings
	W	L	T	PCT	PF	PA	STK
Chicago Staleys	9	1	1	.900	128	53	T1
Buffalo All-Americans	9	1	2	.900	211	29	L1
Akron Pros	8	3	1	.727	148	31	W1
Canton Bulldogs	5	2	3	.714	106	55	W1
Rock Island Independents	4	2	1	.667	65	30	L1
Evansville Crimson Giants	3	2	0	.600	89	46	W1
Green Bay Packers	3	2	1	.600	70	55	L1
Dayton Triangles	4	4	1	.500	96	67	L1
Chicago Cardinals	3	3	2	.500	54	53	T1
Rochester Jeffersons	2	3	0	.400	85	76	W2
Cleveland Tigers	3	5	0	.375	95	58	L1
Washington Senators	1	2	0	.334	21	43	L1
Cincinnati Celts	1	3	0	.250	14	117	L2
Hammond Pros	1	3	1	.250	17	45	L2
Minneapolis Marines	1	3	0	.250	37	41	L1
Detroit Tigers	1	5	1	.167	19	109	L5
Columbus Panhandles	1	8	0	.111	47	222	W1
Tonawanda Kardex	0	1	0	.000	0	45	L1
Muncie Flyers	0	2	0	.000	0	28	L2
Louisville Brecks	0	2	0	.000	0	27	L2
New York Brickley Giants	0	2	0	.000	0	72	L2

Note: Tie games were not officially counted in the standings until 1972.
