= 1921 Evansville Crimson Giants season =

Sports season

- Head coach: Frank Fausch
- Home stadium: Bosse Field

Results
- Record: 3–2 APFA (7–2–1 overall)
- Division place: 6th APFA
- Playoffs: No playoffs until 1932

The 1921 Evansville Crimson Giants season was their inaugural in the young American Professional Football Association (APFA), an assemblage later renamed the National Football League.

The team played all but one game on their home field in 1921, winning three out of five league contests, and going undefeated hosting non-APFA opponents.

The team finished in sixth place out of the 21 teams in the APFA.

== Schedule ==
| Game | Date | Opponent | Result | Record | Venue | Attendance | Recap | Sources |
|---|---|---|---|---|---|---|---|---|
| 1 | October 2 | Louisville Brecks | W 21–0 | 1–0 | Bosse Field | 2,000 | Recap | |
| 2 | October 9 | Muncie Flyers | W 14–0 | 2–0 | Bosse Field | "a large crowd" | Recap | |
| 3 | October 16 | Hammond Pros | L 0–3 | 2–1 | Bosse Field | | Recap | |
| – | October 23 | New Albany Calumet Indians | W 90–0 | — | Bosse Field | | | |
| – | October 30 | Camp Knox Officers | W 90–0 | — | Bosse Field | | | |
| 4 | November 6 | at Green Bay Packers | L 6–43 | 2–2 | Hagemeister Park | "smallest crowd of season" | Recap | |
| – | November 11 | Kentucky All-Stars | W 7–0 | — | Bosse Field | | | |
| 5 | November 27 | Cincinnati Celts | W 48–0 | 3–2 | Bosse Field | | Recap | |
| – | December 4 | Indianapolis Football Club | W 17–0 | — | Bosse Field | | | |
| – | December 18 | Paducah Alumni | T 0–0 | — | Bosse Field | | | |
Note: Games in italics indicate a non-league opponent.

== Standings ==
APFA standings
| | W | L | T | PCT | PF | PA | STK |
|---|---|---|---|---|---|---|---|
| Chicago Staleys | 9 | 1 | 1 | .900 | 128 | 53 | T1 |
| Buffalo All-Americans | 9 | 1 | 2 | .900 | 211 | 29 | L1 |
| Akron Pros | 8 | 3 | 1 | .727 | 148 | 31 | W1 |
| Canton Bulldogs | 5 | 2 | 3 | .714 | 106 | 55 | W1 |
| Rock Island Independents | 4 | 2 | 1 | .667 | 65 | 30 | L1 |
| Evansville Crimson Giants | 3 | 2 | 0 | .600 | 89 | 46 | W1 |
| Green Bay Packers | 3 | 2 | 1 | .600 | 70 | 55 | L1 |
| Dayton Triangles | 4 | 4 | 1 | .500 | 96 | 67 | L1 |
| Chicago Cardinals | 3 | 3 | 2 | .500 | 54 | 53 | T1 |
| Rochester Jeffersons | 2 | 3 | 0 | .400 | 85 | 76 | W2 |
| Cleveland Tigers | 3 | 5 | 0 | .375 | 95 | 58 | L1 |
| Washington Senators | 1 | 2 | 0 | .334 | 21 | 43 | L1 |
| Cincinnati Celts | 1 | 3 | 0 | .250 | 14 | 117 | L2 |
| Hammond Pros | 1 | 3 | 1 | .250 | 17 | 45 | L2 |
| Minneapolis Marines | 1 | 3 | 0 | .250 | 37 | 41 | L1 |
| Detroit Tigers | 1 | 5 | 1 | .167 | 19 | 109 | L5 |
| Columbus Panhandles | 1 | 8 | 0 | .111 | 47 | 222 | W1 |
| Tonawanda Kardex | 0 | 1 | 0 | .000 | 0 | 45 | L1 |
| Muncie Flyers | 0 | 2 | 0 | .000 | 0 | 28 | L2 |
| Louisville Brecks | 0 | 2 | 0 | .000 | 0 | 27 | L2 |
| New York Brickley Giants | 0 | 2 | 0 | .000 | 0 | 72 | L2 |

Note: Tie games were not officially counted in the standings until 1972.
