= Bill DuMoe =

American football player (1898–1983)

Billy DuMoe
Profile
- Position: Tight end

Personal information
- Born: March 14, 1898; Duluth, Minnesota
- Died: May 6, 1983 (aged 85)
- Listed height: 5 ft 10 in (1.78 m)
- Listed weight: 175 lb (79 kg)

Career information
- High school: Duluth (MN) Central

Career history
- Green Bay Packers (1921)

Career statistics
- Games played: 6
- Receiving Touchdowns: 1
- Interceptions for Touchdowns: 1

William George DuMoe (March 14, 1898 – May 6, 1983) was an American football tight end in the American Professional Football Association (the precursor to the National Football League) who played for the Green Bay Packers. DuMoe played professionally for one season, in 1921.
