= Bernie Halstrom =

American football player (1895–1951)

Profile
- Position: Halfback

Personal information
- Born: April 18, 1895; Chicago, Illinois, U.S.
- Died: September 15, 1951 (aged 56); Dade County, Florida, U.S.
- Listed height: 5 ft 9 in (1.75 m)
- Listed weight: 160 lb (73 kg)

Career information
- College: Illinois

Career history
- Chicago Cardinals (1920–1921)

Awards and highlights
- National Champion (1919)

Career statistics
- Games played: 13
- Games started: 9
- Stats at Pro Football Reference

Bernie Christian Halstrom (April 18, 1895 – September 15, 1951) was an American football halfback who played two seasons for the Chicago Cardinals. He played college football at the University of Illinois for the Illinois Fighting Illini football team.
