= George Kraemer =

American football player (1894–1974)

Profile
- Positions: Guard, tackle

Personal information
- Born: June 2, 1894; Joliet, Illinois
- Died: September 22, 1974 (aged 80); Chicago, IL
- Listed height: 6 ft 2 in (1.88 m)
- Listed weight: 240 lb (109 kg)

Career history
- Minneapolis Marines (1916–1924)

Career statistics
- Games: 19
- Stats at Pro Football Reference

George Lambert Kraemer (June 2, 1894 – September 22, 1974), sometimes listed as George Kramer, was an American football player. He played professional football as a guard for the Minneapolis Marines from 1916 to 1924. He also served for many years with the Minneapolis Fire and Police Departments.

== Early life ==
Kraemer was born in 1894 in either Joliet, Illinois, or Minnesota.

== Professional football ==
Kraemer played professional football for the Minneapolis Marines in 1916 prior to the formation of the National Football League (NFL). When the NFL was formed, the Marines were included, and Kraemer continued with the club in its NFL years from 1921 to 1924. He played primarily as a guard, but also as a tackle and back. He appeared in 19 NFL games, 10 as a starter. He also played in 1926 for the Twin City All-Stars, at which time the Minneapolis Daily Star wrote that he had "performed brilliantly on various professional football teams of local repute in the last few years at a guard position."

== Fire/police career and later years ==
While playing football, Kraemer held jobs initially with the Minneapolis Fire Department stating in 1917, then transferring to the Minneapolis Police Department in 1923. While serving with the police department, Kraemer received eight commendations and killed three men in the line of duty. One of his commendations was for arresting 97 vagrants in a two-day period. In 1931, he engaged in a gunfight with a prowler that put him on the front page of The Minneapolis Star. In 1945, Kraemer left the police department and operated a bar in Minneapolis until 1950.

Kraemer died of a heart attack in 1965 at age 68 at his home in Minneapolis.
