= 1921 Hammond Pros season =

Sports season

- Owner: "Doc" Alva Young
- Head coach: Max Hicks
- Home stadium: None (Traveling team)

Results
- Record: 1–3–1 (APFA) (1–5–2 overall)
- League place: T-13th APFA

The 1921 Hammond Pros season was their second completed in the young American Professional Football Association (APFA), a league soon to reorganize as the National Football League (NFL). The team only managed to play five games against APFA opponents, winning just one of these contests.

The Pros, managed by "Doc" Alva Young, were unable to find an opponent on one prime fall Sunday, October 23, when they "learned at the last minute" that their planned foe, the Detroit Tigers, did not actually have an available opening on their schedule. This minor catastrophe was followed the next weekend by another disaster, when a scheduled game with the Chicago Cardinals was postponed due to heavy rains that transformed Normal Park into an unplayable sea of mud. While that contest was merely rolled back seven days, another prime fall game day was nevertheless lost.

Weather again became problematic in November, when a scheduled game against All-American Fritz Pollard and the Chicago Morris Supremes was canceled when torrential precipitation turned the infield dirt of Comiskey Park into a slop bowl. The teams were eventually able to reschedule for Boxing Day at the International Amphitheater, a horse-racing track with a covered grandstand. This was no blessing — the Pros were crushed in this late season contest, 42 to 0, capping what must have been regarded as a miserable year and unsuccessful year.

The Hammond Pros managed just one field goal and two touchdowns in 8 games played in 1921.

== Schedule ==
Game	Date	Opponent	Result	Record	Venue	Attendance	Recap	Sources
1	October 2	at Buffalo All-Americans	L 0–17	0–1	Canisius Villa	3,500	Recap	
2	October 9	at Canton Bulldogs	T 7–7	0-1–1	Lakeside Park		Recap	
3	October 16	at Evansville Crimson Giants	W 3–0	1–1–1	Bosse Field		Recap	
—	October 23	(open date)	unable to negotiate date with opponent					
—	October 30	at Chicago Cardinals	postponed due to heavy rain					
4	November 6	at Chicago Cardinals	L 0–7	1–2–1	Normal Park	4,000	Recap	
5	November 13	at Green Bay Packers	L 7–14	1–3–1	Hagemeister Park	"small-sized crowd"	Recap	
—	November 20	at Chicago Morris Supremes	canceled by Morris Supremes due to muddy field					
—	November 24	at Gary Elks	L 0–7	—	Gleason Park	5,000+	—	
—	November 27	at Chicago Boosters	T 0–0	—	Logan Square Park		—	
—	December 26	at Chicago Morris Supremes	L 0–42	—	International Amphitheater		—	
Note: Games in italics indicate a non-league opponent. Thanksgiving Day: November 24.

== Standings ==
APFA standings
	W	L	T	PCT	PF	PA	STK
Chicago Staleys	9	1	1	.900	128	53	T1
Buffalo All-Americans	9	1	2	.900	211	29	L1
Akron Pros	8	3	1	.727	148	31	W1
Canton Bulldogs	5	2	3	.714	106	55	W1
Rock Island Independents	4	2	1	.667	65	30	L1
Evansville Crimson Giants	3	2	0	.600	89	46	W1
Green Bay Packers	3	2	1	.600	70	55	L1
Dayton Triangles	4	4	1	.500	96	67	L1
Chicago Cardinals	3	3	2	.500	54	53	T1
Rochester Jeffersons	2	3	0	.400	85	76	W2
Cleveland Tigers	3	5	0	.375	95	58	L1
Washington Senators	1	2	0	.334	21	43	L1
Cincinnati Celts	1	3	0	.250	14	117	L2
Hammond Pros	1	3	1	.250	17	45	L2
Minneapolis Marines	1	3	0	.250	37	41	L1
Detroit Tigers	1	5	1	.167	19	109	L5
Columbus Panhandles	1	8	0	.111	47	222	W1
Tonawanda Kardex	0	1	0	.000	0	45	L1
Muncie Flyers	0	2	0	.000	0	28	L2
Louisville Brecks	0	2	0	.000	0	27	L2
New York Brickley Giants	0	2	0	.000	0	72	L2

Note: Tie games were not officially counted in the standings until 1972.
