= Eber Sampson =

American football player

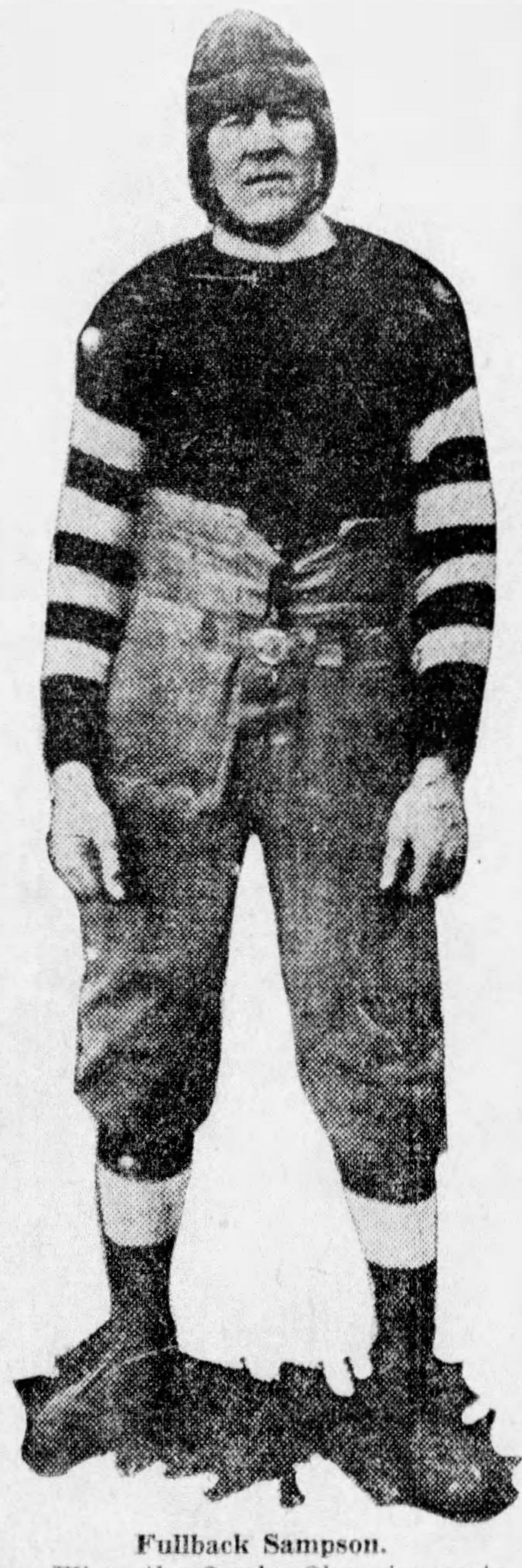
- Sampson, 1922

Profile
- Positions: Fullback, halfback

Personal information
- Born: c. 1895
- Listed height: 6 ft 0 in (1.83 m)
- Listed weight: 197 lb (89 kg)

Career history
- Minneapolis Marines (1921–1923)

Career statistics
- Games: 14
- Stats at Pro Football Reference

Eber Sampson (born c. 1895) was an American football player. He played professional football in the National Football League (NFL) as a fullback and halfback for the Minneapolis Marines. He appeared in 14 NFL games, 13 as a starter, from 1921 to 1923. He scored three NFL touchdowns. Two of his touchdowns were scored in a single game, a 28–0 victory over the Columbus Panhandles.

Sampson also served as the kicker for the Minnesota Marines, but statistical data is not available for kicks converted during the earliest years of the NFL. Likewise, statistical data is unavailable for rushing yardage, though an account of a game played on September 26, 1920, indicates that Sampson rushed for 116 yards on 26 carries and completed three of six passes for 52 yards. He was described in a November 1920 account as "the individual star of the pastime for the Marines" who made long gains on the ground, kicked well, and "hurled forward passes with accuracy and speed."

He was known by the nickname "Oats".
