= 1921 Chicago Boosters season =

American football team season

- Home stadium: Logan Square Park

Results
- Record: 4-2-3
- Division place: No divisions
- Playoffs: No playoffs

The 1921 Chicago Boosters season was their second season in existence. The team was independent and posted a 4-2-3 record. It was their final season.

== Schedule ==
The table below was compiled using the information from The Pro Football Archives. The winning teams score is listed first. If a cell is greyed out and has "N/A", then that means there is an unknown figure for that game. Green-colored rows indicate a win; yellow-colored rows indicate a tie; and red-colored rows indicate a loss.

Game	Date	Opponent	Result	Venue	Attendance	Record
1	September 25, 1921	Green Bay Packers	13-0 L	Hagemeister Park	3,500	0-1
2	October 9, 1921	Moline Indians	3-0 W	Browning Field	—	1-1
3	October 16, 1921	Chicago Staym-Foresters	0-0 T	Logan Square Park	3,500	1-1-1
4	October 23, 1921	Joliet Elks	34-0 W	Logan Square Park	—	2-1-1
5	October 30, 1921	Racine Legion	Cancelled	—	—	2-1-1
6	November 6, 1921	Chicago Thorn-Tornadoes	20-7 W	Logan Square Park	—	3-1-1
7	November 13, 1921	Great Lakes Naval Station	14-0 W	Logan Square Park	—	4-1-1
8	November 24, 1921	Moline Indians	0-0 T	—	—	4-1-2
9	November 27, 1921	Hammond Pros	0-0 T	Logan Square Park	—	4-1-3
10	December 18, 1921	Chicago Opal A.A.	7-0 L	Dexter Pavilion	—	4-2-3
