= 1921 Buffalo All-Americans season =

Sports season

- Head coach: Tommy Hughitt
- Home stadium: Canisius College

Results
- Record: 10–1–2 Overall; 9–1–2 APFA
- Division place: 2nd APFA
- Playoffs: Lost 10–7 to Chicago Staleys

The 1921 Buffalo All-Americans season was their second completed in the fledgling American Professional Football Association (APFA), later known as the National Football League (NFL). The team played 10 of their 12 league games at home, finishing 9–1–2 against league opponents.

The team lost the league title to the Chicago Staleys in a disputed tiebreaker, played on the road the day after a game played against another opponent in Buffalo.

== Background ==
During the 1921 season, several of the Buffalo All-Americans, most notably future Philadelphia Eagles co-founder Lud Wray, also played for the Philadelphia Quakers, an independent club based in Philadelphia, Pennsylvania.

Since Philadelphia was subject to blue laws in the commonwealth of Pennsylvania, the Quakers had to play their games on Saturdays, as opposed to the Sundays used by the APFA, including Buffalo. The Buffalo players played for Philadelphia on Saturday, then traveled back to Buffalo for Sunday's game. A few days before Buffalo played Canton, the league found out about violation of league policy, and made the players choose for which team they wanted to play. Five, including Wray, chose to stay with the Quakers, blaming the Buffalo management for "blowing the whistle."

Buffalo was able to hire players from the Detroit Heralds, who folded midseason, to complete their roster.

For the 1921 season the All-Americans had a payroll of $2,000 per game for their 16-man roster.

== Schedule ==
| Game | Date | Opponent | Result | Record | Venue | Attendance | Recap | Sources |
|---|---|---|---|---|---|---|---|---|
| – | September 25 | McKeesport Olympics | W 28–0 | — | Canisius Villa | 3,000+ | — | |
| 1 | October 2 | Hammond Pros | W 17–0 | 1–0 | Canisius Villa | 3,500 | Recap | |
| 2 | October 9 | Columbus Panhandles | W 38–0 | 2–0 | Canisius Villa | "a good-sized crowd" | Recap | |
| 3 | October 16 | New York Brickley Giants | W 55–0 | 3–0 | Canisius Villa | 7,500 | Recap | |
| 4 | October 23 | Rochester Jeffersons | W 28–0 | 4–0 | Canisius Villa | 10,000 | Recap | |
| 5 | October 30 | Detroit Tigers | W 21–0 | 5–0 | Canisius Villa | 7,000 | Recap | |
| 6 | November 6 | Cleveland Tigers | W 10–6 | 6–0 | Canisius Villa | 7,000 | Recap | |
| 7 | November 13 | Akron Pros | T 0–0 | 6–0–1 | Buffalo Baseball Park | "a large crowd" | Recap | |
| 8 | November 20 | Canton Bulldogs | T 7–7 | 6–0–2 | Canisius Villa | | Recap | |
| 9 | November 24 | at Chicago Staleys | W 7–6 | 7–0–2 | Cubs Park | | Recap | |
| 10 | November 27 | Dayton Triangles | W 7–0 | 8–0–2 | Canisius Villa | 3,500 | Recap | |
| 11 | December 3 | Akron Pros | W 14–0 | 9–0–2 | Canisius Villa | | Recap | |
| 12 | December 4 | at Chicago Staleys | L 7–10 | 9–1–2 | Cubs Field | 12,000 | Recap | |
Note: Non-APFA opponents in italics. Thanksgiving Day: November 24.

== Standings ==
All-Americans fullback Pat Smith stands in the end zone after a 15-yard scoring run against the Canton Bulldogs, November 20.

APFA standings
| | W | L | T | PCT | PF | PA | STK |
|---|---|---|---|---|---|---|---|
| Chicago Staleys | 9 | 1 | 1 | .900 | 128 | 53 | T1 |
| Buffalo All-Americans | 9 | 1 | 2 | .900 | 211 | 29 | L1 |
| Akron Pros | 8 | 3 | 1 | .727 | 148 | 31 | W1 |
| Canton Bulldogs | 5 | 2 | 3 | .714 | 106 | 55 | W1 |
| Rock Island Independents | 4 | 2 | 1 | .667 | 65 | 30 | L1 |
| Evansville Crimson Giants | 3 | 2 | 0 | .600 | 89 | 46 | W1 |
| Green Bay Packers | 3 | 2 | 1 | .600 | 70 | 55 | L1 |
| Dayton Triangles | 4 | 4 | 1 | .500 | 96 | 67 | L1 |
| Chicago Cardinals | 3 | 3 | 2 | .500 | 54 | 53 | T1 |
| Rochester Jeffersons | 2 | 3 | 0 | .400 | 85 | 76 | W2 |
| Cleveland Tigers | 3 | 5 | 0 | .375 | 95 | 58 | L1 |
| Washington Senators | 1 | 2 | 0 | .334 | 21 | 43 | L1 |
| Cincinnati Celts | 1 | 3 | 0 | .250 | 14 | 117 | L2 |
| Hammond Pros | 1 | 3 | 1 | .250 | 17 | 45 | L2 |
| Minneapolis Marines | 1 | 3 | 0 | .250 | 37 | 41 | L1 |
| Detroit Tigers | 1 | 5 | 1 | .167 | 19 | 109 | L5 |
| Columbus Panhandles | 1 | 8 | 0 | .111 | 47 | 222 | W1 |
| Tonawanda Kardex | 0 | 1 | 0 | .000 | 0 | 45 | L1 |
| Muncie Flyers | 0 | 2 | 0 | .000 | 0 | 28 | L2 |
| Louisville Brecks | 0 | 2 | 0 | .000 | 0 | 27 | L2 |
| New York Brickley Giants | 0 | 2 | 0 | .000 | 0 | 72 | L2 |

Note: Tie games were not officially counted in the standings until 1972.

== De facto championship game ==
The Chicago Staleys (to be renamed the Chicago Bears after the end of the season), led by player-coach George Halas, an end, and the Buffalo All-Americans, led by quarterback Tommy Hughitt and fullback Elmer Oliphant, were the two top teams in the league; each playing all of their games at home, Buffalo and Chicago amassed 6–0 records in league play. On Thanksgiving 1921, Buffalo played one of its only road games of the season, in Chicago, and prevailed 7–6. Chicago demanded a rematch.

The All-Americans agreed to rematch the Staleys on December 4, again in Chicago, on the condition that the game would be considered a "post-season" exhibition game not to be counted in the standings; had it not, Buffalo would have had an undefeated season and won the title. (Buffalo had played, and defeated, the Akron Pros just one day prior.) Chicago defeated Buffalo, who did not have the services of the Heralds players it had borrowed (they were playing against the Detroit Maroons the same day), in the rematch by a score of 10–7. Halas rebutted that the second game was played on December 4 (well before teams typically stopped playing games in those days), and the Staleys played two more games against top opponents, the Canton Bulldogs and Chicago Cardinals after the second Buffalo game (though, at the time of the Buffalo-Chicago matchup, Chicago had played three fewer games than Buffalo).

The league counted the All-Americans game in the standings, against Buffalo's wishes, resulting in Buffalo (9–1–2) and Chicago (9–1–1) being tied atop the standings. The league then implemented the first ever tiebreaker: a rule, now considered archaic and removed from league rulebooks, that states that if two teams play multiple times in a season, the last game between the two teams carries more weight. Thus, the Chicago victory actually counted more in the standings, giving Chicago the championship. Buffalo sports fans have been known to refer to this, justly or unjustly, as the "Staley Swindle."

Oliphant was the most valuable player for the All-Americans as he led the league in scoring; (47 points), FGs (5) and PATs (26), 1 touchdown; he also led the league in touchdown passes (7).

== Roster ==
According to Pro Football Reference, the following players saw game action as members of the 1921 Buffalo All-Americans. Number of games played are in parentheses. APFA opening day starter marked with †, final game starter marked with ‡, per contemporary newspaper accounts.

Backs

- Ockie Anderson (11) †‡
- Andy Hillhouse (1)
- Tommy Hughitt (12) †‡
- Waddy Kuehl (2)
- Jack O'Hearn (2)
- Elmer Oliphant (10) †‡
- Johnny Scott (7)
- Pat Smith (11) †‡
- Eddie Usher (1)

Linemen

- Carl Beck (6)
- Bill Brace (11) †‡
- Moose Gardner (1)
- Charlie Guy (5) ‡
- Steamer Horning (4) ‡
- Jim Laird (1)
- Lou Little (6) †
- Heinie Miller (7) †
- Bob Nash (11) †‡

Linemen

- Butch Spagna (4)
- Herb Stein (1)
- Jack Sullivan (3)
- Luke Urban (12) †‡
- Tillie Voss (4)
- Bill Ward (9) ‡
- Lud Wray (7) †
- Swede Youngstrom (12) †‡
