= Walnut Street Park =

Park in Hillsboro, Oregon

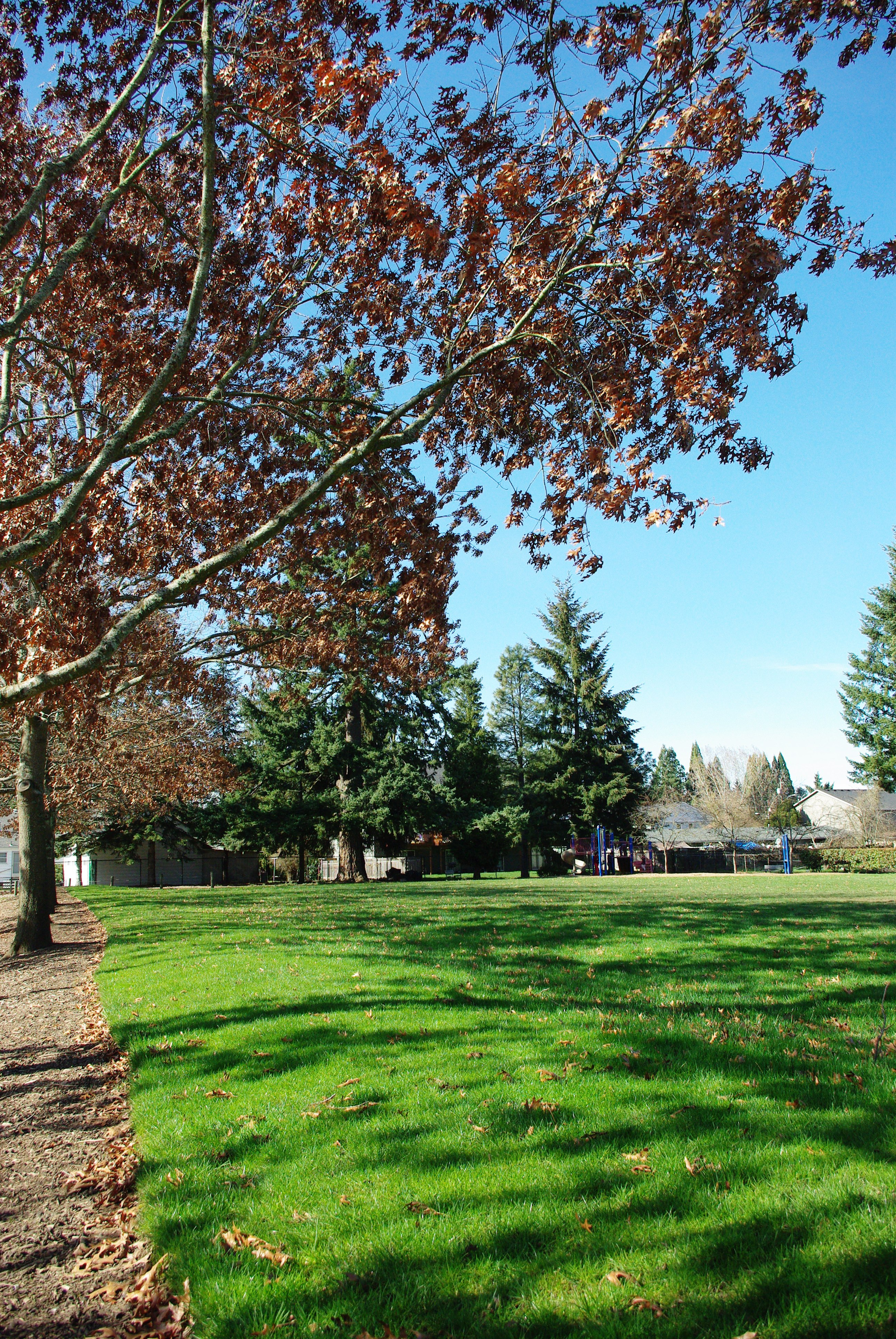
- Interactive map of Walnut Street Park
- Type: Public, city
- Location: Hillsboro, Oregon; United States
- Coordinates: 45°31′32″N 122°59′14″W
- Area: 2.5 acres (10,000 m^{2})
- Created: 1998
- Operator: Hillsboro Parks & Recreation Department
- Status: open
- Parking: On-street parking

Walnut Street Park is a small municipal park in Hillsboro in the U.S. state of Oregon. Opened in 1998, the park covers 2.5 acres (10,000 m^{2}) along southeast Walnut Street several blocks east of Tenth Avenue in a predominantly Hispanic neighborhood.

== History ==
The park was built around 1998 in the mainly Hispanic neighborhood southeast of Downtown Hillsboro. During a gang fight in 2001 at the park, one person was hospitalized with a stab wound, and around 2005 a picnic table was stolen from the park. The park was added by the Hillsboro School District to the list of parks used for the district's free summer lunch program in 2006.

Walnut Street Park was the scene of a shooting in March 2008, and an arrest for a stabbing in July 2011. The shooting was considered gang related, while the stabbing was a domestic disturbance at a nearby home after which the suspect hid in the park. Sexual Minorities of Washington County adopted the park in 2009 as part of the city's Adopt a Park program.

In 2012, a federal grant paid for improvements at the park, including a splash pad. Other improvements paid for by the $175,000 grants included new park benches and grass. The park received new sod in October 2012 as part of the same renovations. The used sod came from a former softball field at the Gordon Faber Recreation Complex that was removed to make way for the new Hillsboro baseball stadium. A man was arrested in March 2014 for firing gunshots in the park.

== Amenities ==
The 2.5-acre (1.0 ha) park is in a residential neighborhood, surrounded by housing, and does not have any natural areas. Walnut Street Park does have many older deciduous trees throughout, along with grassy areas. Other features of the park include sidewalks, picnic tables, a children's playground, picnic shelter, soccer field, and a basketball court. The park only has on-street parking along Walnut Street.
