= George Bolan =

American football player (1897–1940)

Profile
- Position: Running back

Personal information
- Born: April 30, 1897; Lake Forest, Illinois, U.S.
- Died: January 17, 1940 (aged 42); New York City, U.S.

Career information
- College: Purdue

Career history
- 1921–1924: Chicago Bears
- Stats at Pro Football Reference

George Henry Bolan (April 30, 1897 – January 17, 1940) was an American professional football player who was a running back for four seasons for the Chicago Bears.
