= Triangle Park (Dayton) =

Former American football stadium in Dayton, Ohio

- Triangle Park
- Interactive map of Triangle Park
- Location: Dayton, Ohio
- Coordinates: 39.785030°N 84.199596°W
- Owner: Dayton, Ohio
- Operator: Dayton Triangles
- Capacity: 5,000 (American football)
- Surface: Grass

Construction
- Opened: 1916

Tenant
- Dayton Triangles

Triangle Park is a former American football stadium located in Dayton, Ohio. The stadium was opened in 1916 as a company baseball field for employees of Dayton Engineering Laboratories (Delco), a Dayton firm established in 1909. Soon after the park's establishment it was expanded by an additional four acres of land adjacent to the park abutting the Stillwater River.

The stadium was home to the Dayton Triangles of the National Football League from 1920 to 1929. It held a capacity of 5,000 spectators. It was located at the confluence of the Great Miami River and Stillwater River. On October 3, 1920, it hosted the first NFL game against the Columbus Panhandles.

Currently, Triangle Park is a park in the city of Dayton, known formally as Triangle Park Pavilion, located on 1700 Embury Park Rd., near Island Metro Park in North Dayton. Its features include both a baseball/softball diamond and a soccer field and it can be booked for special events.

In 2019, in honor of the NFL's centennial season, the league announced that it would fund the construction of a new artificial turf field at Triangle Park, and make donations to local youth football programs. Additionally, the Cincinnati Bengals planned to host a practice on the newly constructed field in late July or early August 2019. In response to the announcement by the NFL to build the new turf field, a local Native American leader filed suit to halt and cease the project in order to protect possible human remains and other Native artifacts from two Native American burial sites located in or near Triangle Park.

Ohio's state historic preservation office stated that the burial sites are a "considerable distance" from the proposed site of the field. Despite this, the city of Dayton announced that they would postpone breaking ground on the new field until officials could be certain that the construction would not disturb anything of historical value. On May 15, 2019, the city of Dayton officially scrapped the field, after a survey discovered a "unique and sizable anomaly" in the area that was "potentially prehistoric". The training camp practice was held at Welcome Stadium instead. In July 2019, the NFL announced that it would construct the field at Dayton's Kettering Field park.
