= Normal Park =

Football field in Chicago

Coordinates: 41°46′53.11″N 87°39′16.34″W

Normal Park was a football and baseball field in Chicago, Illinois, during approximately 1914 through 1951. It was most notably the home field of the Chicago Cardinals before they moved to Comiskey Park.

The field was on a block bounded by South Racine Avenue (to the east, previously Centre Avenue); West 61st Street (north); West 62nd Street (south); and South Throop Street (west). Normal Avenue (or Normal Boulevard) is also sometimes given as one of its bordering streets, although Normal Avenue (500W) is about 7 blocks east of Racine (1200W). There may have been some confusion due to "Normal Park" also having been the name of a Chicago neighborhood in the general area. In local newspapers, the location of the field was typically given as "61st Street and Racine Avenue" or sometimes "62nd Street and Racine Avenue" In city directories, the location of "Normal Park Stadium" was reported as the southwest corner of West 61st Street and South Racine Avenue.

Paddy Driscoll carries the ball in a pre-season game ahead of the 1925 National League season.

The Chicago Cardinals started out as the "Morgan Athletic Club" in 1898 and changed their name to "Racine Normals" after they began playing at Normal Park. Soon after, they became the "Racine Cardinals". This change came after they acquired some reddish hand-me-down jerseys from the University of Chicago football team, the Maroons.

The Cardinals joined the new American Professional Football Association (soon renamed to what is now the National Football League) and continued to use Normal Park as their home field for several years and continued to be called the Racine Cardinals for a while. They changed their name again, to "Chicago Cardinals", to avoid confusion after the National Football League fielded a team in Racine, Wisconsin.

Starting in 1922, they split time between Normal Park and Comiskey Park before finally abandoning the old field in the late 1920s. The park no longer exists. On the eastern portion of the site along Racine sits a Chicago Police Department facility which was built in 1952. The western portion of the site is occupied by single family homes built on a cul-de-sac where the field once was. The only evidence of the field is an otherwise unexplained discontinuation of Elizabeth Street, which abruptly ends halfway between 61st and 62nd Streets and then resumes again a half-block north at 61st.

Preceded by first stadium Comiskey Park	Home of the Chicago Cardinals; 1920 – 1921; 1926 – 1928	Succeeded by Comiskey Park
