= List of players who appeared in only one game in the NFL (1920–1929) =

This is a list of American football players who played only one game in the National Football League (NFL) during the league's first decade from 1920 to the 1929. This list includes players from the American Professional Football Association (APFA) during the 1920 and 1921 seasons, i.e., before the APFA was renamed the NFL in 1922. This list does not include those who were on an active roster but never actually appeared in a game. Nor does it include those who appeared only in a pre-season or exhibition game.

== Key ==
- Date - The "Date" column is intended to provide the date of the player's appearance in an NFL game. If the exact date has not yet been verified, then the column simply lists the year.
- Start - The "Start" column is intended to state whether or not the player's appearance in an NFL game was as a "starter". If the player appeared in the game as a substitute, the entry should state "No".

== 1920 ==
Name	Position	Team	Date	Start	College	Source
Shirley Brick	End	Buffalo All-Americans	1920-11-14	No	Rice	
Max Broadhurst	Tackle	Dayton Triangles	1920	No	Western Reserve, Case Tech	
Matt Brown	Halfback	Akron Pros	1920	No	Syracuse	
Ralph Capron	Back	Chicago Tigers	1920	Yes	Minnesota	
Eddie Casey	Back	Buffalo All-Americans	1920	No	Harvard	
Tony Catalano	Guard	Hammond Pros	1920	No	None	
Len Charpier	Fullback	Racine Cardinals	1920	Yes	Illinois	
Fred Clarke	End	Rochester Jeffersons	1920	No	None	
Bill Connell	Back	Rochester Jeffersons	1920	No	None	
Moon Ducote	Back	Cleveland Tigers	1920	Yes	Auburn	
Arch Erehart	Back	Muncie Flyers	1920	Yes	Indiana	
Charlie Essman	Guard	Columbus Panhandles	1920	No	Christian Brothers	
Walt Frickey	End	Rochester Jeffersons	1920	No	None	
Birdie Gardner	Tackle	Canton Bulldogs	1920	No	Carlisle	
Gates	Guard	Detroit Heralds	1920	No	None	
Wilbur Henderson	Fullback	Hammond Pros	1920	No	None	
Tom Henry	Back	Rock Island Independents	1920	No	LSU	
Pat Herron	End	Cleveland Tigers	1920	Yes	Pittsburgh	
Lenny High	End	Decatur Staleys	1920	No	Eastern Illinois	
Bill Joyce	Quarterback	Detroit Heralds	1920	Yes	Holy Cross, Catholic University	
King	Back	Detroit Heralds	1920	No	Unknown	
John Kvist	Tackle	Rochester Jeffersons	1920	No	None	
Alvin Loucks	Guard	Detroit Heralds	1920	No	Michigan	
George Magerkurth	Tackle	Rock Island Independents	1920	No	None	
Phil Marshall	End	Cleveland Tigers	1920	Yes	Carnegie Tech	
Mathewson	Back	Hammond Pros	1920	No	None	
McCoy	Tackle	Detroit Heralds	1920	No	None	
Ralph Meadow	End	Canton Bulldogs	1920	Yes	None	
Buck Miles	Fullback	Akron Pros	1920	No	Washington and Lee	
Pepper	Guard	Rochester Jeffersons	1920	No	None	
Joseph Plunkett	Back	Chicago Tigers	1920	No	None	
Spencer Pope	End	Muncie Flyers	1920	No	Indiana	
Bill Preston	Tackle	Akron Pros	1920	No	Missouri	
Speed Riddell	End	Rock Island Independents	1920	No	Nebraska	
Loyal Robb	Tackle	Rock Island Independents	1920	No	None	
John Rupp	Guard	Buffalo All-Americans	1920	No	None	
Heinie Schultz	End	Detroit Heralds	1920	No	None	
Sullivan	Fullback	Rock Island Independents	1920	No	None	
Jim Talbott	Back	Hammond Pros	1920	No	North Dakota	
Howard Yerges Sr.	Back	Columbus Panhandles	1920	Yes	Ohio State	
Randy Young	End	Decatur Staleys	1920	No	Millikin	

== 1921 ==
Name	Position	Team	Date	Start	College	Source
Nate Abrams	End	Green Bay Packers	1921	No	None	
Alec Anderson	Guard	Washington Senators	1921	No	Boston College, Holy Cross, Georgetown	
Backnor	Center	Tonawanda Kardex	1921-11-06	No	None	
Ping Bodie	Fullback	Racine Cardinals	1921	No	None	
Fred Brumm	Tackle	Tonawanda Kardex	1921-11-06	No	Union (NY)	
Cassidy	Back	Tonawanda Kardex	1921-11-06	No	None	
Red Chenoweth	Back	Louisville Brecks	1921	Yes	West Virginia	
Howard Coster	Tackle	Washington Senators	1921	No	Maryland	
Fred Day	Tackle	Cincinnati Celts	1921	No	Ohio Wesleyan	
Joe DuSossoit	End	New York Brickley Giants	1921	Yes	Dartmouth	
Earl Ettenhaus	Guard	Rochester Jeffersons	1921-11-20	No	None	
Louie Fritsch	Guard	Evansville Crimson Giants	1921	No	Georgetown (KY)	
Ken Fulton	Guard	Muncie Flyers	1921	Yes	None	
Patsy Gerardi	End	Washington Senators	1921	No	None	
Art Goerke	End	Tonawanda Kardex	1921-11-06	Yes	None	
Percy W. Griffiths	Guard	Canton Bulldogs	1921	Yes	Bloomsburg, Penn State	
Fatty Harris	Tackle	Louisville Brecks	1921	No	None	
Andy Hillhouse	Halfback	Buffalo All-Americans	1921	No	Brown	
Clarence Hosmer	Guard	Tonawanda Kardex	1921-11-06	No	None	
Bill Houser	Guard, tackle	Louisville Brecks	1921	Yes	None	
Karl Hower	Fullback	Louisville Brecks	1921	Yes	None	
Mark Ingle	Guard	Evansville Crimson Giants	1921	No	None	
Jimmy Jemail	Quarterback	New York Brickley Giants	1921	Yes	Brown, Navy	
Charlie Jonasen	End	Minneapolis Marines	1921	No	None	
Ralph Jones	Back	Hammond Pros	1921	No	Wabash	
George Kane	Guard	New York Brickley Giants	1921	No	Fordham	
Sam Kaplan	End	Washington Senators	1921	Yes	Lehigh, Catholic U.	
Kellogg	Halfback	Muncie Flyers	1921	Yes		
Adolph Kliebhan	Back	Green Bay Packers	1921	Yes	None	
Rudy Kraft	Guard, center	Tonawanda Kardex	1921-11-06	Yes	Penn State	
George Kuhrt	Tackle	Tonawanda Kardex	1921-11-06	Yes	None	
Wally Ladrow	Halfback	Green Bay Packers	1921	No	None	
Doc LaDuron	Fullback	Muncie Flyers	1921	Yes	Indiana	
Henry Lewis	Guard	Louisville Brecks	1921	No	None	
Harry Livers	Fullback	Washington Senators	1921	No	Georgetown	
Ray MacMurray	Guard	Muncie Flyers	1921	Yes	Lincoln, Dartmouth	
Herman Martell	End	Green Bay Packers	1921	No	None	
Joe Martin	Halfback	Louisville Brecks	1921	Yes	None	
Tom McLaughlin	Fullback	Tonawanda Kardex	1921-11-06	Yes	Notre Dame	
Bill Meisner	Back	Tonawanda Kardex	1921-11-06	Yes	Syracuse	
John Miller	Fullback	Dayton Triangles	1921	No	Notre Dame	
Moore	Tackle	Cleveland Indians	1921	Yes	Unknown	
Ted Moser	Guard	Louisville Brecks	1921	Yes	None	
Johnny Nagle	End	New York Brickley Giants	1921	No	None	
Harry Newland	End	Louisville Brecks	1921	Yes	None	
Con O'Brien	Tackle	New York Brickley Giants	1921	Yes	Boston College	
Ohmer	Back	Cincinnati Celts	1921	Yes	None	
Henry Orth	Guard	Cincinnati Celts	1921	Yes	Miami (OH)	
Frank Primeau	Back	Tonawanda Kardex	1921-11-06	Yes	None	
Rice	Back	Hammond Pros	1921	No	None	
Tam Rose	Halfback	Tonawanda Kardex	1921-11-06	Yes	Syracuse	
Bill Sanborn	End	Tonawanda Kardex	1921-11-06	Yes	None	
Shriner (Note: Not listed by Pro-Football-Reference.com as having played professionally.)	Unknown	Cincinnati Celts	1921	No	Unknown	
Pete Slone	End	Muncie Flyers	1921	No	None	
Marv Smith	Back	Canton Bulldogs	1921	No	Purdue	
Howie Stith	Guard	Louisville Brecks	1921	No	None	
Charlie Tallman	Tackle	Tonawanda Kardex	1921-11-06	Yes	None	
Dave Thompson	Back	Cincinnati Celts	1921	No	Denison	
Tiney (Note: Not listed by Pro-Football-Reference.com as having played professionally.)	Tackle	Rochester Jeffersons	1921	No	Unknown	
Gene Vidal	Fullback	Washington Senators	1921	Yes	Nebraska, South Dakota, Army	
Earl Warweg	Back	Evansville Crimson Giants	1921	No	None	
Martin Zoll	Guard	Green Bay Packers	1921	No	None	

== 1922 ==
Name	Position	Team	Date	Start	College	Source
Anderson	Back	Hammond Pros	1922	No	None	
Norris Armstrong	Tackle	Milwaukee Badgers	1922	No	Centre	
Burl Atcheson	End	Columbus Panhandles	1922	No	None	
Benton (Note: Not listed by Pro-Football-Reference.com as having played professionally.)	End	Rochester Jeffersons	1922	Yes	None	
Eddie Benz	End	Rochester Jeffersons	1922	Yes	None	
Alex Bobidosh	End	Oorang Indians	1922	No	None	
Fred Broker	Tackle	Oorang Indians	1922	No	Carlisle	
Al Burgin	Guard	Toledo Maroons	1922	Yes	None	
Slats Dalrymple	Center	Evansville Crimson Giants	1922	Yes	Indiana, Wabash	
Winnie Denton	Guard	Evansville Crimson Giants	1922	Yes	DePauw	
Vic Endress	Back	Evansville Crimson Giants	1922	Yes	None	
Doc Fay	End	Green Bay Packers	1922	No	Marquette	
Norm Glockson	Guard	Racine Legion	1922	Yes	None	
Pete Lauer	Fullback	Evansville Crimson Giants	1922	Yes	Iowa	
Max MacCollum	End	Louisville Brecks	1922	Yes	Centre	
Brian McGrath	Guard	Louisville Brecks	1922	Yes	None	
Harry J. Robertson	Tackle	Rochester Jeffersons	1922	Yes	Syracuse	
Buck Saunders	Back	Toledo Maroons	1922	No	California	
Bill Singleton	Guard	Hammond Pros	1922	No	Washington University	
Bill Slyker	End	Evansville Crimson Giants	1922	Yes	Ohio State	
Frank Spellacy	End	Buffalo All-Americans	1922	Yes	None	
Baptiste Thunder	Tackle	Oorang Indians	1922	Yes	None	
Walker Whitehead	Back	Evansville Crimson Giants	1922	Yes	None	
Willert	Center	Hammond Pros	1922	No	None	
Carl Zoll	Guard	Green Bay Packers	1922	No	None	

== 1923 ==
Name	Position	Team	Date	Start	College	Source
A. C. Baur	Tackle	Racine Legion	1923	Yes	Illinois	
Red Emslie	Guard	Rochester Jeffersons	1923	Yes	None	
Al Espie	Tackle	Louisville Brecks	1923	Yes	None	
Pascal Giugliano	Back	Louisville Brecks	1923	No	None	
Harold Hansen	Fullback, End	Green Bay Packers	1923	No	Minnesota	
Cliff Jetmore	Halfback	Toledo Maroons	1923	No	None	
Cy Kasper	Halfback	Rochester Jeffersons	1923	Yes	Notre Dame	
Joe McShea	Guard	Rochester Jeffersons	1923	Yes	Rochester	
Red Morse	Guard	Duluth Kelleys	1923	Yes	None	
John Quast	End	Louisville Brecks	1923	Yes	Purdue	
Ed Rate	Back	Milwaukee Badgers	1923	Yes	Purdue	
Joe Setron	Guard	Cleveland Indians	1923	No	West Virginia	
Ben Shaw	Guard	Canton Bulldogs	1923	No	None	
Roy Vassau	Tackle	Milwaukee Badgers	1923	Yes	St. Thomas	
Hal Wilder	Guard	St. Louis All-Stars	1923	Yes	Nebraska Wesleyan, Nebraska	
Ernie Winburn	End	St. Louis All-Stars	1923	No	Central Missouri State	

== 1924 ==
Name	Position	Team	Date	Start	College	Source
Reaves Baysinger	End	Rochester Jeffersons	1924	Yes	Syracuse	
Emil Beasy	Back	Green Bay Packers	1924	Yes	None	
Jim Bradshaw	Back	Kansas City Blues	1924	No	Illinois, Nevada	
Eddie Bratt	End	Duluth Kelleys	1924	No	None	
Bob Choate	Guard	Kansas City Blues	1924	No	Haskell	
Herbert Clow	Guard	Duluth Kelleys	1924	No	Wisconsin-Superior	
Lee Croft	Guard	Racine Legion	1924	Yes	Wisconsin-Platteville	
Art Engstrom	Guard	Duluth Kelleys	1924-9-28	Yes	Chicago	
Swede Erickson	End	Kenosha Maroons	1924	No		
Dick Hanley	Back	Racine Legion	1924	No	Washington State	
Oscar Johnson	Fullback	Chicago Bears	1924	No	Vermont	
Shine Kinderdine	Guard	Dayton Triangles	1924	No	None	
Joe Mantell	Guard	Columbus Tigers	1924	Yes	None	
Munger	Tackle	Chicago Cardinals	1924	Yes	None	
Nielson	Back	Rochester Jeffersons	1924	Yes	None	
Clem Nugent	Fullback	Rochester Jeffersons	1924	No	Iowa	
Harry O'Connell	Tackle	Chicago Bears	1924	No	Chicago	
Bill O'Toole	Guard	Duluth Kelleys	1924	No	None	
Ivan Quinn	Guard	Kansas City Blues	1924	Yes	Carroll (WI)	
Riley	Guard	Racine Legion	1924	Yes	None	
Jim Sanford	Tackle	Duluth Kelleys	1924	No	Lehigh	
Dick Sears	Tackle	Kansas City Blues	1924	No	Kansas State	
Basil Stanley	Guard	Rock Island Independents	1924	No	Notre Dame	
Elmer Volgenau	Guard	Rochester Jeffersons	1924	Yes	Colgate	

== 1925 ==
Name	Position	Team	Date	Start	College	Source
Paul Anderson	Guard	Rock Island Independents	1925	No	Illinois	
Les Asplundh	Fullback	Buffalo Bisons	1925	No	Swarthmore	
Lester Belding	End	Rock Island Independents	1925	No	Iowa	
Phil Branon	Tackle	Cleveland Bulldogs	1925	No	Holy Cross	
Bill Bucher	End	Detroit Panthers	1925	Yes	Clarkson	
Ham Connors	End	Rochester Jeffersons	1925	Yes	None	
Jack Daniels	Back	Milwaukee Badgers	1925	No	None	
Darroll DeLaPorte	Back	Milwaukee Badgers	1925	Yes	None	
Wop Drumstead	Guard	Hammond Pros	1925	Yes	None	
Gus Ekberg	Fullback	Cleveland Bulldogs	1925	No	Minnesota, West Virginia	
Wilmer Fleming	Halfback	Canton Bulldogs	1925	No	Mount Union	
John Gabler	Guard	Dayton Triangles	1925	No	None	
Harry Hall	Back	Rock Island Independents	1925	Yes	Chicago, Illinois	
Ching Hammill	Back	Providence Steam Roller	1925	Yes	Connecticut, Villanova, Georgetown	
Fritz Henry	Guard	Akron Pros	1925	Yes	None	
Ed Herman	End	Rock Island Independents	1925	Yes	Northwestern	
Chuck Hill	Fullback, End	Rock Island Independents	1925	Yes	Iowa State	
Jake Kaufman	Tackle	Frankford Yellow Jackets	1925	No	None	
Jimmy Kennedy	Fullback	Buffalo Bisons	1925	Yes	Boston College, Holy Cross	
William C. Kenyon	Back	New York Giants	1925	No	Georgetown	
Mike Koziak	Back	Duluth Kelleys	1925	Yes	None	
Rudy Kutler	Guard	Cleveland Bulldogs	1925	No	Ohio State	
Glen Magnusson	Guard	Hammond Pros	1925	Yes	Northwestern	
Johnny Mahrt	End	Dayton Triangles	1925	No	Dayton	
Hugh McGoldrick	Tackle, end	Providence Steam Roller	1925	No	Lehigh	
Don Miller	Halfback	Providence Steam Roller	1925	Yes	Notre Dame	
Tom Moran	Back	New York Giants	1925	No	Centre	
Ray Norton	Back	Cleveland Bulldogs	1925	No	None	
Charlie Richardson	Back	Milwaukee Badgers	1925	No	None	
Fred Sheehan	Back	Providence Steam Roller	1925	Yes	Georgetown	
Jim Snyder	Back	Milwaukee Badgers	1925	No	None	
Spike Staff	Guard	Providence Steam Roller	1925	No	Brown	
Bill Thompson	Center	Milwaukee Badgers	1925	No	None	
Rex Tobin	End	Duluth Kelleys	1925	No	None	

== 1926 ==
Name	Position	Team	Date	Start	College	Source
Ben Bangs	Back	Los Angeles Buccaneers	1926	No	Washington State	
Fred Beach	Guard	Los Angeles Buccaneers	1926	No	California	
Hook Comer	Fullback	Canton Bulldogs	1926	Yes	None	
Don Dimmick	Fullback	Buffalo Rangers	1926	No	Hobart	
Jim Eiden	Tackle	Louisville Colonels	1926	Yes	None	
Carl Etelman	Back	Providence Steam Roller	1926	Yes	Tufts	
Tom Golsen	Guard	Louisville Colonels	1926	No	Georgetown	
Glenn Greenwood	Fullback	Louisville Colonels	1926	No	Iowa	
Steve Hanson	End	Louisville Colonels	1926	Yes	Carthage	
Jim Jaquith	Back	Kansas City Cowboys	1926	No	Emporia	
Len Johnson	Back	Columbus Tigers	1926	Yes	Syracuse	
Steve Kobolinski	Center	Brooklyn Lions	1926	No	Boston College	
Lou Koplow	Tackle	Providence Steam Roller	1926	Yes	Boston U.	
Roy Longstreet	Center	Racine Tornadoes	1926	Yes	Iowa State	
Herbert Magida	Back	Hammond Pros	1926	No	None	
Walter Mahan	Guard	Frankford Yellow Jackets	1926	Yes	West Virginia	
Walt McGaw	Guard	Green Bay Packers	1926	No	Beloit	
Joe McGlone	Back	Providence Steam Roller	1926	Yes	Harvard	
Jack McKetes	Back	Hammond Pros	1926	No	None	
Dick Noble	Guard	Hartford Blues	1926	No	Trinity (CT)	
Aaron Oliker	End	Pottsville Maroons	1926	Yes	West Virginia	
Omensky	Guard	Louisville Colonels	1926	Yes	None	
Roger Powell	Back	Buffalo Rangers	1926	No	Texas A&M	
Red Quam	Back	Duluth Eskimos	1926	No	None	
Ed Reagen	Back	Brooklyn Lions	1926	No	None	
Frank Seeds	Back	Canton Bulldogs	1926	Yes	None	
Rocky Segretta	End	Hartford Blues	1926	No	None	
Frank Seyboth	Back	Providence Steam Roller	1926	No	Vermont	
James Sheldon	End	Brooklyn Lions	1926	No	Brown	
Gerry Sherry	Fullback	Louisville Colonels	1926	Yes	None	
Stan Sieracki	Tackle	Hartford Blues	1926	No	Penn	
George Slagle	Guard	Louisville Colonels	1926	No	Penn	
Mel Stuessy	Tackle	Chicago Cardinals	1926	No	St. Edward's	
Harry Stuhldreher	Back	Brooklyn Lions	1926	No	Notre Dame	
Hew Sullivan	Guard	Duluth Eskimos	1926	No	None	
Pete Vainowski	Guard	Louisville Colonels	1926	Yes	Loyola	
Harold Zerby	End	Canton Bulldogs	1926	No	None	

== 1927 ==
Name	Position	Team	Date	Start	College	Source
Nick Farina	Center	Pottsville Maroons	1927	No	Villanova	
Aubrey Goodman	Tackle	Chicago Cardinals	1927	No	Baylor, Chicago	
Rollin Roach	Fullback	Chicago Cardinals	1927	Yes	TCU	
Shanley	Tackle	Duluth Eskimos	1927	No	None	
George Tully	End	Frankford Yellow Jackets	1927	No	Dartmouth	
George Tuttle	End	Green Bay Packers	1927	No	Minnesota	

== 1928 ==
Name	Position	Team	Date	Start	College	Source
Rip Bachor	Tackle	Detroit Wolverines	1928	Yes	Detroit	
Homer Bliss	Guard	Chicago Cardinals	1928	Yes	Washington & Jefferson	
Emil Dobry	End	Frankford Yellow Jackets	1928	No	Montana	
John Holman	Tackle	New York Giants	1928	Yes	None	
Lyons Kelliher	Guard	Chicago Cardinals	1928	No	None	
Reggie Russell	End	Chicago Bears	1928	No	None	
Aubrey Strosnider	Tackle	Dayton Triangles	1928	No	Dayton	

== 1929 ==
Name	Position	Team	Date	Start	College	Source
John Depner	End	Dayton Triangles	1929	Yes	None	
Bob Dwyer	Back	Orange Tornadoes	1929	No	Georgetown	
John Kauffman	Tackle, guard	Dayton Triangles	1929	Yes	None	
LaDue Lurth	Halfback	Minneapolis Red Jackets	1929	No	Gustavus Adolphus	
Ralph Marston	Quarterback	Boston Bulldogs	1929	Yes	Boston U.	
Jack O'Brien	Halfback	Minneapolis Red Jackets	1929	Yes	Minnesota	
Art Peed	Tackle	Buffalo Bisons	1929	No	None	
Ted Richards	End	Chicago Bears	1929	No	Illinois	
Harry Richman	Guard	Chicago Bears	1929	No	Illinois	
Roy Scholl	Guard	Boston Bulldogs	1929	No	Lehigh	
Jack Shapiro	Back	Staten Island Stapletons	1929	No	NYU	
Ed Tolley	Guard	Dayton Triangles	1929	No	None	
Thurston Towle	End	Boston Bulldogs	1929	No	Brown	

== See also ==
- List of players who appeared in only one game in the NFL (1930–1939)
