= 1922 Racine Legion season =

Sports season

- Head coach: Babe Ruetz
- Home stadium: Horlick Field

Results
- Record: 6–4–1
- League place: 6th in NFL

Although organized in the previous year, the 1922 Horlick-Racine Legion season marked the club's inaugural season in the National Football League (NFL). The team finished 6–4–1, good for sixth place in the 18-team league.

== Background ==
Hank Gillo was organizer, coach, and star of the Racine Legion football team in the fall of 1921.

The Racine Legion football team did not suddenly spring from the soil in 1922. The club was first formed by the Racine post of the American Legion in the summer of 1921. Having already sponsored teams in other sports' the team's initial goal seemed modest: to make the team the best in Racine. Assisting in the creation was William Horlick, president of his family's eponymous malted milk company, a profitable firm of the day. Horlick was a financial angel and provided use of his company's employee ball yard, Horlick Athletic Field, for home games.

The football club was officially named Horlick-Racine Legion in recognition of this dual sponsorship. The team was sometimes referred to as "The Horlicks" in the contemporary press. It remained a project of the local American Legion post, however, and it was the post which accrued the team's financial losses, which were significant in 1922 and 1923. The post solicited donations from local fans and hosted fundraising event in an effort to offset this negative cash flow.

== Schedule ==
Early NFL teams made use of local talent. Elmer "Swede" Rhenstrom was born in Kenosha, Wisconsin, and went to school at Beloit.

Game	Date	Opponent	Result	Record	Venue	Attendance	Recap	Sources
1	October 1	Chicago Bears	L 0–6	0–1	Horlick Field	4,000	Recap	
2	October 8	at Green Bay Packers	W 10–6	1–1	Hagemeister Park	8,000	Recap	
3	October 15	at Milwaukee Badgers	L 0–20	1–2	Athletic Park	6,000	Recap	
4	October 22	Toledo Maroons	L 0–7	1–3	Horlick Field	3,500	Recap	
5	October 29	Rochester Jeffersons	W 9–0	2–3	Horlick Field		Recap	
6	November 5	Louisville Brecks	W 57–0	3–3	Horlick Field		Recap	
7	November 11	Columbus Panhandles	W 34–0	4–3	Horlick Field	"not up to expectations"	Recap	
8	November 19	Green Bay Packers	T 3–3	4–3–1	Horlick Field	3,000	Recap	
9	November 26	Hammond Pros	W 6–0	5–3–1	Horlick Field	1,034	Recap	
10	November 30	Milwaukee Badgers	W 3–0	6–3–1	Horlick Field	3,500	Recap	
11	December 3	Green Bay Packers	L 0–14	6–4–1	Horlick Field	4,500	Recap	
Note: Armistice Day: November 11. Thanksgiving Day: November 30.

== Standings ==
NFL standings
	W	L	T	PCT	PF	PA	STK
Canton Bulldogs	10	0	2	1.000	184	15	W6
Chicago Bears	9	3	0	.750	123	44	L1
Chicago Cardinals	8	3	0	.727	96	50	W1
Toledo Maroons	5	2	2	.714	94	59	L2
Rock Island Independents	4	2	1	.667	154	27	L1
Racine Legion	6	4	1	.600	122	56	L1
Dayton Triangles	4	3	1	.571	80	62	W1
Green Bay Packers	4	3	3	.571	70	54	W2
Buffalo All-Americans	5	4	1	.556	87	41	W2
Akron Pros	3	5	2	.375	146	95	L3
Milwaukee Badgers	2	4	3	.333	51	71	L3
Oorang Indians	3	6	0	.333	69	190	W2
Minneapolis Marines	1	3	0	.250	19	40	L1
Louisville Brecks	1	3	0	.250	13	140	W1
Evansville Crimson Giants	0	3	0	.000	6	88	L3
Rochester Jeffersons	0	4	1	.000	13	76	L4
Hammond Pros	0	5	1	.000	0	69	L2
Columbus Panhandles	0	8	0	.000	24	174	L8

Note: Tie games were not officially counted in the standings until 1972.

== Roster ==
The following individuals played at least one NFL game for the Horlick-Racine Legion football team in 1922. The total number of NFL game appearances in 1922 follows in parentheses.

While no player on the 1922 Racine roster made the Pro Football Hall of Fame, quarterback Chuck Dressen went on to have a 50 year career as a player and manager in Major League Baseball.

Linemen

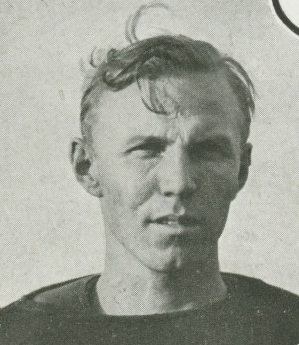
After playing three games for the Canton Bulldogs, Raymond "Candy" Miller came over to Racine, where he started 8 games at right tackle.

- Buddy Baumann (4)
- George Berry (2)
- Art Braman (8)
- Bob Foster (10)
- Carl George (3)
- Norm Glockson (1)
- Earl Gorman (11)
- Norbert Hayes (11)
- Jack Hueller (9)
- Frank Linnan (3)
- George McGill (3)
- Ray "Candy" Miller (8)
- Jack Mintun (7)
- Jab Murray (8)
- Don Murry (4)
- Elmer "Swede" Rhenstrom (6)
- Fritz Roeseler (11)
- Vincent Shekleton (3)
- Whitey Woodin (4)

Backs

- Moxie Dalton (5)
- Chuck Dressen (7)
- Al Elliott (11)
- Hank Gillo (11)
- Fritz Heinisch (5)
- Jerry Johnson (3)
- Irv Langhoff (11)
- Dudley Pearson (4)
- Wally Sieb (2)
