= 1922 Oorang Indians season =

Sports season

- Owner: Walter Lingo
- Head coach: Jim Thorpe
- Home stadium: Lincoln Park<rf>(Marion, Ohio)

Results
- Record: 3–6 (NFL) (5–8 overall)
- League place: 11th NFL

The 1922 Oorang Indians season was their inaugural season in the National Football League (NFL). The team was organized by legendary back Jim Thorpe and featured a Native American roster, a feature which allowed aggressive promotion of games. Practicing in tiny La Rue, Ohio, the team played all but one of its contests on the road, its one "home" game taking place in neighboring Marion, Ohio. The Indians finished the 1922 season with a record of 3–6, eleventh best in the league.

== Background ==
The team's name, Oorang Indians, is the object of some confusion. The name was adopted due to the sponsorship of the team by Walter Lingo, proprietor of Oorang Kennels of La Rue, Ohio. Lingo was a dog breeder and sportsman, specializing in the perfection of champion Airedale Terriers. Lingo was attracted to the fellowship of some of the leading celebrities of his era, including baseball players Ty Cobb and Tris Speaker, athletic legend Jim Thorpe, boxer Jack Dempsey, and actor Gary Cooper — all of whom he was known to hunt with, together with his dogs.

In June 1922, Lingo purchased a franchise in the fledgling National Football League for $100. Lingo acted as the team's business manager and tapped his friend Jim Thorpe to organize, recruit, and star on the team. Together the two perfected the idea of establishing an all-Native American team and touring the squad almost exclusively — generating publicity for Lingo's kennels while covering expenses through collection of appearance guarantees.

Spending so much time on the road and placing tight demographic limits on team membership makes it difficult to field a competitive team. However, the presence of Thorpe notwithstanding. Oorang battled to a record of 3 wins and 6 losses in 1922, playing just one game at home in Marion. Their second season, 1923, would prove even worse and would be their last in the NFL.

== Schedule ==
Game	Date	Opponent	Result	Record	Venue	Attendance	Recap	Sources
1	October 1	at Dayton Triangles	L 0–36	0–1	Triangle Park	~5,500	Recap	
2	October 8	Columbus Panhandles	W 20–6	1–1	Lincoln Park	1,200	Recap	
—	October 11	at Ohio Cranes	W 20–6	—	Seccaium Park; Bucyrus, Ohio	100	—	
3	October 15	at Canton Bulldogs	L 0–14	1–2	Lakeside Park	5,100+	Recap	
—	October 22	at Indianapolis Belmonts	W 33–0	—	Washington Park	2,000	—	
4	October 29	at Akron Pros	L 0–62	1–3	Elks' Field	3,000	Recap	
5	November 5	at Minneapolis Marines	L 6–13	1–4	Nicollet Park	4,000	Recap	
6	November 12	at Chicago Bears	L 6–33	1–5	Cubs Park	3,300	Recap	
7	November 19	at Milwaukee Badgers	L 0–13	1–6	Athletic Park	6,500	Recap	
8	November 26	at Buffalo All-Americans	W 19–7	2–6	Buffalo Baseball Park	3,000	Recap	
9	November 30	at Columbus Panhandles	W 18–6	3–6	Neil Park	3,000	Recap	
—	December 3	at Lansing Durant All-Stars	L 0–29	—	Pattengill Stadium	5,000	—	
—	December 9	at Baltimore Pros	L 0–7	—	Venable Stadium	< 5,000	—	
Note: Non-NFL opponent in italics. Thanksgiving Day: November 30.

== Standings ==
NFL standings
	W	L	T	PCT	PF	PA	STK
Canton Bulldogs	10	0	2	1.000	184	15	W6
Chicago Bears	9	3	0	.750	123	44	L1
Chicago Cardinals	8	3	0	.727	96	50	W1
Toledo Maroons	5	2	2	.714	94	59	L2
Rock Island Independents	4	2	1	.667	154	27	L1
Racine Legion	6	4	1	.600	122	56	L1
Dayton Triangles	4	3	1	.571	80	62	W1
Green Bay Packers	4	3	3	.571	70	54	W2
Buffalo All-Americans	5	4	1	.556	87	41	W2
Akron Pros	3	5	2	.375	146	95	L3
Milwaukee Badgers	2	4	3	.333	51	71	L3
Oorang Indians	3	6	0	.333	69	190	W2
Minneapolis Marines	1	3	0	.250	19	40	L1
Louisville Brecks	1	3	0	.250	13	140	W1
Evansville Crimson Giants	0	3	0	.000	6	88	L3
Rochester Jeffersons	0	4	1	.000	13	76	L4
Hammond Pros	0	5	1	.000	0	69	L2
Columbus Panhandles	0	8	0	.000	24	174	L8

Note: Tie games were not officially counted in the standings until 1972.

== Roster ==
The following individuals saw action in at least one NFL game for the Oorang Indians in 1922. The number of games in which each player appeared follows in parentheses.

Linemen

- Alex Bobidosh (1)
- Fred Broker (1)
- Elmer Busch (9)
- Pete Calac (9)
- Dick Deer Slayer (2)
- Xavier "Red Fang" Downwind (5)
- Bob Hill (6)
- Buck Jones (2)
- Nick Lassa (9)
- Joe Little Twig (2)
- Ted Lone Wolf (5)
- Stillwell Saunooke (9)
- Ted St. Germaine (5)
- Baptiste Thunder (1)
- C.B. Winneshiek (5)

Backs

- Reggie "Laughing Gas" Attache (8)
- Lo Boutwell (8)
- Joe Guyon (9)
- Ed Nason ("Running Deer") (4)
- Jim Thorpe (5)
