= 1922 Canton Bulldogs season =

Sports season

- Owner: Ralph Hay
- Head coach: Guy Chamberlin
- Home stadium: Lakeside Park

Results
- Record: 10–0–2
- League place: 1st NFL

The 1922 Canton Bulldogs season was their third season in what now was called the National Football League (NFL). The team finished with the league-best 10–0–2 record.

== Schedule ==
Game	Date	Opponent	Result	Record	Venue	Attendance	Recap	Sources
1	October 1	Louisville Brecks	W 38–0	1–0	Lakeside Park	3,000	Recap	
2	October 8	at Dayton Triangles	T 0–0	1–0–1	Triangle Park	3,000	Recap	
3	October 15	Oorang Indians	W 14–0	2–0–1	Lakeside Park		Recap	
4	October 22	at Akron Pros	W 22–0	3–0–1	Elks' Field		Recap	
5	October 29	at Chicago Bears	W 7–6	4–0–1	Cubs Park	10,000	Recap	
6	November 5	Toledo Maroons	T 0–0	4–0–2	Lakeside Park		Recap	
7	November 12	Buffalo All-Americans	W 3–0	5–0–2	Lakeside Park	2,000	Recap	
8	November 19	at Chicago Cardinals	W 7–0	6–0–2	Comiskey Park	7,500	Recap	
9	November 26	Chicago Cardinals	W 20–3	7–0–2	Lakeside Park	2,500	Recap	
10	November 30	Akron Pros	W 14–0	8–0–2	Lakeside Park		Recap	
11	December 3	Milwaukee Badgers	W 40–6	9–0-2	Lakeside Park		Recap	
12	December 10	at Toledo Maroons	W 19–0	10–0–2	Swayne Field	5,000	Recap	
Note: Thanksgiving Day: November 30.

== Standings ==
NFL standings
	W	L	T	PCT	PF	PA	STK
Canton Bulldogs	10	0	2	1.000	184	15	W6
Chicago Bears	9	3	0	.750	123	44	L1
Chicago Cardinals	8	3	0	.727	96	50	W1
Toledo Maroons	5	2	2	.714	94	59	L2
Rock Island Independents	4	2	1	.667	154	27	L1
Racine Legion	6	4	1	.600	122	56	L1
Dayton Triangles	4	3	1	.571	80	62	W1
Green Bay Packers	4	3	3	.571	70	54	W2
Buffalo All-Americans	5	4	1	.556	87	41	W2
Akron Pros	3	5	2	.375	146	95	L3
Milwaukee Badgers	2	4	3	.333	51	71	L3
Oorang Indians	3	6	0	.333	69	190	W2
Minneapolis Marines	1	3	0	.250	19	40	L1
Louisville Brecks	1	3	0	.250	13	140	W1
Evansville Crimson Giants	0	3	0	.000	6	88	L3
Rochester Jeffersons	0	4	1	.000	13	76	L4
Hammond Pros	0	5	1	.000	0	69	L2
Columbus Panhandles	0	8	0	.000	24	174	L8

Note: Tie games were not officially counted in the standings until 1972.

== Game summaries ==
=== Game 1: vs. Louisville Brecks ===
	1	2	3	4	Total
Brecks	0	0	0	0	0
Bulldogs	6	13	6	13	38

at Lakeside Park, Canton, Ohio

The Bulldogs opened their 1922 season with a win against the Louisville Brecks. Playing under a crowd of 3,000, the Bulldogs won 38 to 0. In the first quarter, Candy Miller scored a 10-yard rushing touchdown. In the second quarter, Arda Bowser had a 16-yard rushing touchdown and Ed Shaw had a rushing touch down as well. Norb Sacksteder contributed too by having a rushing touchdown in the third quarter. Chamberlin and Bowser both had rushing touchdowns in the fourth quarter. The Bulldogs' kicker, Bowser, made two and missed four extra points.

=== Game 2: at Dayton Triangles ===
	1	2	3	4	Total
Bulldogs	0	0	0	0	0
Triangles	0	0	0	0	0

October 8, 1922, at Triangle Park

The Bulldogs' followed their victory with a 0–0 tie against the Dayton Triangles under a crowd of 3,000.

=== Game 3: vs. Oorang Indians ===
	1	2	3	4	Total
Indians	0	0	0	0	0
Bulldogs	0	0	14	0	14

October 15, 1922, at Lakeside Park

The Bulldog's week 3 opponent was the Oorang Indians. All of the Bulldogs' 14 points came in the third quarter: first from a 60-yard punt return by Sacksteder, then a Harry Robb rushing touchdown. With the addition of two extra points by Shaw, the Bulldogs won 13 to 0.

=== Game 4 (Sunday October 22, 1922): Akron Pros ===
	1	2	3	4	Total
Bulldogs	0	9	6	7	22
Pros	0	0	0	0	0

at Elk's Field, Akron, Ohio

- Game time:
- Game weather:
- Game attendance:
- Referee:

Scoring Drives:

- Canton – FG Shaw 20
- Canton – Sacksteder 38 run (kick failed)
- Canton – Carroll 19 pass from Sacksteder (kick failed)
- Canton – Robb 1 run (Shaw kick)

=== Game 5 (Sunday October 29, 1922): Chicago Bears ===
	1	2	3	4	Total
Bulldogs	7	0	0	0	7
Bears	0	0	0	6	6

at Cubs Park, Chicago, Illinois

- Game time:
- Game weather:
- Game attendance: 10,000
- Referee:

Scoring Drives:

- Canton – Shaw run (Shaw kick)
- Chicago Bears – E. Sternaman run (kick failed)

=== Game 6 (Sunday November 5, 1922): Toledo Maroons ===
	1	2	3	4	Total
Maroons	0	0	0	0	0
Bulldogs	0	0	0	0	0

at Lakeside Park, Canton, Ohio

- Game time:
- Game weather:
- Game attendance:
- Referee:

Scoring Drives:

- none

=== Game 7 (Sunday November 12, 1922): Buffalo All-Americans ===
	1	2	3	4	Total
All-Americans	0	0	0	0	0
Bulldogs	0	3	0	0	3

at Lakeside Park, Canton, Ohio

- Game time:
- Game weather:
- Game attendance: 2,000
- Referee:

Scoring Drives:

- Canton – FG Shaw 30

=== Game 8 (Sunday November 19, 1922): Chicago Cardinals ===
	1	2	3	4	Total
Bulldogs	0	0	0	7	7
Cardinals	0	0	0	0	0

at Comiskey Park, Chicago, Illinois

- Game time:
- Game weather:
- Game attendance: 7,500
- Referee:

Scoring Drives

- Canton – Sacksteder 35 pass from Smyth (Henry kick)

=== Game 9 (Sunday November 26, 1922): Chicago Cardinals ===
	1	2	3	4	Total
Cardinals	3	0	0	0	3
Bulldogs	0	0	0	20	20

at Lakeside Park, Canton, Ohio

- Game time:
- Game weather:
- Game attendance: 2,500
- Referee:

Scoring Drives:

- Chicago Cardinals – FG R. Horween 35
- Canton – Roberts 1 run (Henry kick)
- Canton – Chamberlin 20 pass interception (Henry kick)
- Canton – Chamberlin 15 pass interception (kick failed)

=== Game 10 (Thursday November 30, 1922): Akron Pros ===
	1	2	3	4	Total
Pros	0	0	0	0	0
Bulldogs	7	7	0	0	14

at Lakeside Park, Canton, Ohio

- Game time:
- Game weather:
- Game attendance:
- Referee:

Scoring Drives:

- Canton – Chamberlin blocked punt recovery (Henry kick)
- Canton – Robb 2 run (Shaw kick)

=== Game 11 (Sunday December 3, 1922): Milwaukee Badgers ===
	1	2	3	4	Total
Badgers	0	0	6	0	6
Bulldogs	13	20	0	7	40

at Lakeside Park, Canton, Ohio

- Game time:
- Game weather:
- Game attendance:
- Referee:

Scoring Drives:

- Canton – Elliott run (Carroll kick)
- Canton – Chamberlin 20 run (kick failed)
- Canton – Shaw 5 run (Shaw kick)
- Canton – Smyth run (kick failed)
- Canton – Shaw 1 run (Shaw kick)
- Milwaukee – McMillin 4 pass from Conzelman (kick failed)
- Canton – Chamberlin run (Shaw kick)

=== Week 12 (Sunday December 10, 1922): Toledo Maroons ===
	1	2	3	4	Total
Bulldogs	3	7	0	9	19
Maroons	0	0	0	0	0

at Swayne Field, Toledo, Ohio

- Game time:
- Game weather:
- Game attendance: 5,000
- Referee:

Scoring Drives:

- Canton – FG Henry 45
- Canton – Elliott run (extra point on penalty)
- Canton – FG Henry 45
- Canton – Chamberlin pass from Roberts (kick failed)

Preceded by Chicago Staleys; 1921	NFL Champion; 1922	Succeeded by Canton Bulldogs; 1923
