= 1922 Chicago Cardinals season =

American football team season

- Owner: Chris O'Brien
- Head coach: Paddy Driscoll
- Home stadium: Normal Park (2), Comiskey Park (8)

Results
- Record: 8–3 (NFL) (9–4 overall)
- League place: 3rd NFL

The 1922 Chicago Cardinals season was their third in the National Football League (NFL). The team played 10 of its 11 games a home and improved on their 1921 record of 3–3–2 by winning eight games. They finished third in the league.

== Schedule ==
Cards star halfback Paddy Driscoll was thrown out of the first Bears game for fighting.

Game	Date	Opponent	Result	Record	Venue	Attendance	Recap	Sources
—	September 24	Maplewood Rovers	W 29–0	—	Normal Park	1,000	—	
1	October 1	Milwaukee Badgers	W 3–0	1–0	Normal Park	3,500	Recap	
—	October 8	Hammond Pros	canceled due to rain					
2	October 15	Green Bay Packers	W 16–3	2–0	Normal Park	3,500	Recap	
3	October 22	Minneapolis Marines	W 3–0	3–0	Comiskey Park	4,000	Recap	
4	October 29	Columbus Panhandles	W 37–6	4–0	Comiskey Park	5,000	Recap	
5	November 5	Buffalo All-Americans	W 9–7	5–0	Comiskey Park	4,000	Recap	
6	November 12	Akron Pros	W 7–0	6–0	Comiskey Park	2,000	Recap	
7	November 19	Canton Bulldogs	L 0–7	6–1	Comiskey Park	7,500	Recap	
8	November 26	at Canton Bulldogs	L 3–20	6–2	Lakeside Park	2,500	Recap	
9	November 30	Chicago Bears	W 6–0	7–2	Comiskey Park	14,000	Recap	
10	December 3	Dayton Triangles	L 3–7	7–3	Comiskey Park	3,000	Recap	
11	December 10	Chicago Bears	W 9–0	8–3	Comiskey Park	12,000	Recap	
Note: Non-NFL opponents indicated with italics. Thanksgiving Day: November 30.

== Standings ==
NFL standings
	W	L	T	PCT	PF	PA	STK
Canton Bulldogs	10	0	2	1.000	184	15	W6
Chicago Bears	9	3	0	.750	123	44	L1
Chicago Cardinals	8	3	0	.727	96	50	W1
Toledo Maroons	5	2	2	.714	94	59	L2
Rock Island Independents	4	2	1	.667	154	27	L1
Racine Legion	6	4	1	.600	122	56	L1
Dayton Triangles	4	3	1	.571	80	62	W1
Green Bay Packers	4	3	3	.571	70	54	W2
Buffalo All-Americans	5	4	1	.556	87	41	W2
Akron Pros	3	5	2	.375	146	95	L3
Milwaukee Badgers	2	4	3	.333	51	71	L3
Oorang Indians	3	6	0	.333	69	190	W2
Minneapolis Marines	1	3	0	.250	19	40	L1
Louisville Brecks	1	3	0	.250	13	140	W1
Evansville Crimson Giants	0	3	0	.000	6	88	L3
Rochester Jeffersons	0	4	1	.000	13	76	L4
Hammond Pros	0	5	1	.000	0	69	L2
Columbus Panhandles	0	8	0	.000	24	174	L8

Note: Tie games were not officially counted in the standings until 1972.

== Roster ==
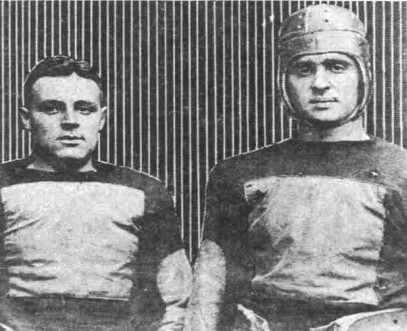
Chicago's backfield featured the Horween brothers, Ralph (L) and Arnold. Both attended Harvard.

The following players saw action in at least one NFL game for the Chicago Cardinals. The number of NFL games played in the year follows in parentheses.

Linemen

- Eddie Anderson (7)
- Willis Brennan (8)
- Garland Buckeye (11)
- Dick Egan (9)
- Fred Gillies (11)
- John Leonard (5)
- Nick McInerney (11)
- Red O'Connor (5)
- Swede Rundquist (10)
- Lenny Sachs (7)
- Bill Whalen (3)
- Clyde Zoia (7)

Backs

- Johnny Bryan (10)
- Paddy Driscoll (11)
- Arnie Horween (11)
- Ralph Horween (9)
- Bob Koehler (10)
- Johnny Mohardt (10)
