= 1922 Green Bay Packers season =

Sports season

- Owner: Curly Lambeau
- Head coach: Curly Lambeau
- Home stadium: Hagemeister Park

Results
- Record: 4–3–3
- League place: 8th NFL

The 1922 Green Bay Packers season was their fourth season overall and their second in the newly named National Football League. The team finished with a 4–3–3 record under player/coach Curly Lambeau earning them eighth place.

== Background ==
The 1922 campaign was technically the franchise first season in the league, after they were removed because the team fielded college players in 1921 season. Owner of the new franchise — to be replaced in 1923 by a public corporation — was player/coach Curly Lambeau. Green Bay representatives filed for a new franchise before the 1922 season under the name of the Green Bay Athletic club, and were registered in the league under the name Green Bay Blues. They returned to the original name a year later, as most teams around the league continued to call them the Packers.

== Schedule ==
Game	Date	Opponent	Result	Record	Venue	Attendance	Recap	Sources
1	October 1	at Rock Island Independents	L 14–19	0–1	Douglas Park	3,500	Recap	
2	October 8	Racine Legion	L 6–10	0–2	Hagemeister Park	8,000	Recap	
3	October 15	at Chicago Cardinals	L 3–16	0–3	Normal Park	3,500	Recap	
4	October 22	at Milwaukee Badgers	T 0–0	0–3–1	Athletic Park	6,000	Recap	
5	October 29	Rock Island Independents	T 0–0	0–3–2	Hagemeister Park	8,000	Recap	
6	November 5	Columbus Panhandles	W 3–0	1–3–2	Hagemeister Park	2,000	Recap	
7	November 12	Minneapolis Marines	W 14–6	2–3–2	Hagemeister Park	< 2,000	Recap	
8	November 19	at Racine Legion	T 3–3	2–3–3	Horlick Field	3,000	Recap	
9	November 26	Milwaukee Badgers	W 13–0	3–3–3	Hagemeister Park	"fair-sized turnout"	Recap	
10	December 3	at Racine Legion	W 14–0	4–3–3	Athletic Park	4,500	Recap	

== Standings ==
NFL standings
	W	L	T	PCT	PF	PA	STK
Canton Bulldogs	10	0	2	1.000	184	15	W6
Chicago Bears	9	3	0	.750	123	44	L1
Chicago Cardinals	8	3	0	.727	96	50	W1
Toledo Maroons	5	2	2	.714	94	59	L2
Rock Island Independents	4	2	1	.667	154	27	L1
Racine Legion	6	4	1	.600	122	56	L1
Dayton Triangles	4	3	1	.571	80	62	W1
Green Bay Packers	4	3	3	.571	70	54	W2
Buffalo All-Americans	5	4	1	.556	87	41	W2
Akron Pros	3	5	2	.375	146	95	L3
Milwaukee Badgers	2	4	3	.333	51	71	L3
Oorang Indians	3	6	0	.333	69	190	W2
Minneapolis Marines	1	3	0	.250	19	40	L1
Louisville Brecks	1	3	0	.250	13	140	W1
Evansville Crimson Giants	0	3	0	.000	6	88	L3
Rochester Jeffersons	0	4	1	.000	13	76	L4
Hammond Pros	0	5	1	.000	0	69	L2
Columbus Panhandles	0	8	0	.000	24	174	L8

Note: Tie games were not officially counted in the standings until 1972.

== Roster ==
The following individuals saw action in at least one NFL game for the 1922 Packers. The total number of NFL games played in the season appears after each name in parentheses.

Linemen

- Cub Buck (10)
- Pahl Davis (7)
- Pat Dunnigan (2)
- Jug Earp (7)
- Doc Fay (1)
- Moose Gardner (9)
- Dave Hayes (7)
- Tubby Howard (8)
- Dewey Lyle (2)
- Jab Murray (3)
- Peaches Nadolney (8)
- Wally Niemann (8)
- Rip Owens (3)
- Joe Secord (2)
- Rex Smith (2)
- Cowboy Wheeler (9)
- Whitey Woodin (6)
- Carl Zoll (1)

Backs

- Tommy Cronin (5)
- Gus Gardella (7)
- Ed Glick (6)
- Curly Lambeau (8)
- Dutch Lauer (2)
- Charlie Mathys (10)
- Stan Mills (8)
- Pete Regnier (5)
- Biff Taugher (2)
- Eddie Usher (5)
