= 1922 Columbus Panhandles season =

Sports season

- Head coach: Herb Dell
- Home stadium: Neil Park

Results
- Record: 0–8
- League place: T–15th NFL

The 1922 Columbus Panhandles season was their third in the National Football League (formerly the American Professional Football Association) and the last season as the Panhandles. The club went winless, playing seven of their eight games on the road and being outscored by their opponents by a cumulative score of 174 to 24.

== Schedule ==
Game	Date	Opponent	Result	Record	Venue	Attendance	Recap	Sources
1	October 1	at Akron Pros	L 0–36	0–1	Elks' Field	3,000	Recap	
2	October 8	at Oorang Indians	L 6–20	0–2	Lincoln Park	1,200	Recap	
3	October 15	at Buffalo All-Americans	L 0–19	0–3	Buffalo Baseball Park		Recap	
—	October 22	(open date)						
4	October 29	at Chicago Cardinals	L 6–37	0–4	Comiskey Park	5,000	Recap	
5	November 5	at Green Bay Packers	L 0–3	0–5	Hagemeister Park	2,000	Recap	
6	November 11	at Racine Legion	L 0–34	0–6	Horlick Field	"not up to expectations"	Recap	
—	November 19	at Youngstown St. Edwards	W 6–0	—	Youngstown, Ohio		—	
7	November 26	at Toledo Maroons	L 6–7	0–7	Swayne Field	1,700	Recap	
8	November 30	Oorang Indians	L 6–18	0–8	Neil Park	3,000	Recap	
Note: Armistice Day: Saturday, November 11. Thanksgiving Day: November 30.

== Standings ==
NFL standings
	W	L	T	PCT	PF	PA	STK
Canton Bulldogs	10	0	2	1.000	184	15	W6
Chicago Bears	9	3	0	.750	123	44	L1
Chicago Cardinals	8	3	0	.727	96	50	W1
Toledo Maroons	5	2	2	.714	94	59	L2
Rock Island Independents	4	2	1	.667	154	27	L1
Racine Legion	6	4	1	.600	122	56	L1
Dayton Triangles	4	3	1	.571	80	62	W1
Green Bay Packers	4	3	3	.571	70	54	W2
Buffalo All-Americans	5	4	1	.556	87	41	W2
Akron Pros	3	5	2	.375	146	95	L3
Milwaukee Badgers	2	4	3	.333	51	71	L3
Oorang Indians	3	6	0	.333	69	190	W2
Minneapolis Marines	1	3	0	.250	19	40	L1
Louisville Brecks	1	3	0	.250	13	140	W1
Evansville Crimson Giants	0	3	0	.000	6	88	L3
Rochester Jeffersons	0	4	1	.000	13	76	L4
Hammond Pros	0	5	1	.000	0	69	L2
Columbus Panhandles	0	8	0	.000	24	174	L8

Note: Tie games were not officially counted in the standings until 1972.
