= 1922 Chicago Bears season =

Sports season

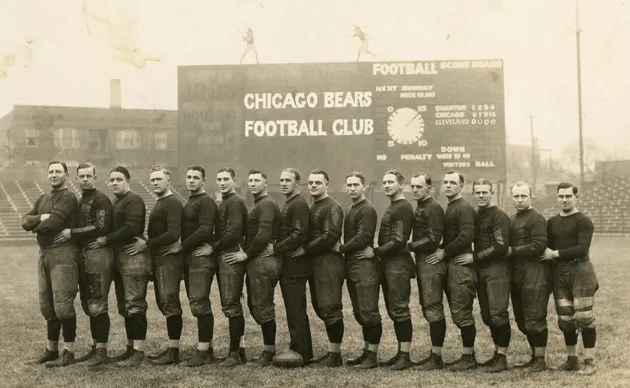
- Owner: George S. Halas, Dutch Sternaman
- Head coach: George Halas
- Home stadium: Cubs Park

Results
- Record: 9–3
- League place: 2nd NFL

The 1922 Chicago Bears season was their third regular season completed in the National Football League, which changed its name from the APFA, and the first under the new franchise name. The team changed the name from Staleys to Bears because Halas wanted his football franchise's nickname to reflect that of the team whose field he used, that being the Chicago Cubs.

The team finished with a 9–3 record under head coach/player George Halas, earning them a second-place finish in the team standings, the second time in the last three years. Two of the three losses were to the Chicago Cardinals, both shutouts suffered "away" at Comiskey Park where the Cardinals played their home games. The other loss was to eventual NFL champion Canton Bulldogs.

In none of their other games were the Bears seriously challenged, with most either shutouts or relative blowouts. Bears co-owner and star left halfback Ed "Dutch" Sternaman led the Bears in scoring for the third straight season, with three touchdowns, 6 field goals, and 5 PATs, finishing with 41 points. His brother Joe Sternaman joined the team and starred by scoring 5 touchdowns and adding 2 PATs.

== Background ==
=== Name change ===
When the move was made from Decatur to Chicago shortly after the start of the 1921 season, original team sponsor A. E. Staley — head of a large and profitable corn products manufacturing company — had provided team organizer George Halas with $5,000 in seed money to expedite a move of the club off his company's books in Decatur to an independent, private existence in Chicago. This grant had been provisional on Halas retaining the team name "Staleys" for one season, thereby ensuring another year's worth of publicity for his company name.

With the arrival of the 1922 season, this agreement with A.E. Staley & Company expired and team co-owners George Hallas and Ed "Dutch" Sternaman were free to rename their football club with a more conventional sports moniker. Since the Chicago Cubs of baseball's National League had helped Halas and Sternaman get settled in Chicago and offered them Cubs Park—the future Wrigley Field—as a home—the pair considered naming their team the Cubs. Ultimately, Halas settled on the name Bears. Years later, Halas recalled that he wanted to pay homage to the Cubs, but reasoned that since football players were far bigger than baseball players, "if baseball players are cubs, then football players must be bears!" On January 28, 1922, Sternaman and Halas incorporated their team in Illinois as the Chicago Bears Football Club, with each man putting up $2,500 and making a joint contribution of $2,500 to provide the company $7,500 in working capital.

A third name was originally listed on the incorporation papers, that of John "Paddy" Driscoll — one of the first superstars of professional football and an acquaintance of Halas' from their time playing together on the Navy's Great Lakes Bluejackets football team during World War I. National Football League president Joe Carr would have none of this, however, Driscoll already being under contract with the rival Chicago Cardinals. Driscoll was severed from the agreement and firm instructions to Halas and Sternaman to cease tampering with another team's star.

== Schedule ==
Game	Date	Opponent	Result	Record	Venue	Attendance	Recap	Sources
1	October 1	at Racine Legion	W 6–0	1–0	Horlick Field	4,000	Recap	
2	October 8	at Rock Island Independents	W 10–6	2–0	Douglas Park	4,749	Recap	
3	October 15	Rochester Jeffersons	W 7–0	3–0	Cubs Park	7,000+	Recap	
4	October 22	Buffalo All-Americans	W 7–0	4–0	Cubs Park	6,500	Recap	
5	October 29	Canton Bulldogs	L 6–7	4–1	Cubs Park	10,000	Recap	
6	November 5	Dayton Triangles	W 9–0	5–1	Cubs Park	"several thousand"	Recap	
7	November 12	Oorang Indians	W 33–6	6–1	Cubs Park	"good-sized crowd"	Recap	
8	November 19	Rock Island Independents	W 3–0	7–1	Cubs Park	8,000	Recap	
9	November 26	Akron Pros	W 20–10	8–1	Cubs Park	6,000	Recap	
10	November 30	at Chicago Cardinals	L 0–6	8–2	Comiskey Park	14,000	Recap	
11	December 3	Toledo Maroons	W 22–0	9–2	Cubs Park	6,000	Recap	
12	December 10	at Chicago Cardinals	L 0–9	9–3	Comiskey Park	15,000	Recap	
Note: Thanksgiving Day: November 30.

== Standings ==
NFL standings
	W	L	T	PCT	PF	PA	STK
Canton Bulldogs	10	0	2	1.000	184	15	W6
Chicago Bears	9	3	0	.750	123	44	L1
Chicago Cardinals	8	3	0	.727	96	50	W1
Toledo Maroons	5	2	2	.714	94	59	L2
Rock Island Independents	4	2	1	.667	154	27	L1
Racine Legion	6	4	1	.600	122	56	L1
Dayton Triangles	4	3	1	.571	80	62	W1
Green Bay Packers	4	3	3	.571	70	54	W2
Buffalo All-Americans	5	4	1	.556	87	41	W2
Akron Pros	3	5	2	.375	146	95	L3
Milwaukee Badgers	2	4	3	.333	51	71	L3
Oorang Indians	3	6	0	.333	69	190	W2
Minneapolis Marines	1	3	0	.250	19	40	L1
Louisville Brecks	1	3	0	.250	13	140	W1
Evansville Crimson Giants	0	3	0	.000	6	88	L3
Rochester Jeffersons	0	4	1	.000	13	76	L4
Hammond Pros	0	5	1	.000	0	69	L2
Columbus Panhandles	0	8	0	.000	24	174	L8

Note: Tie games were not officially counted in the standings until 1972.

== Roster ==
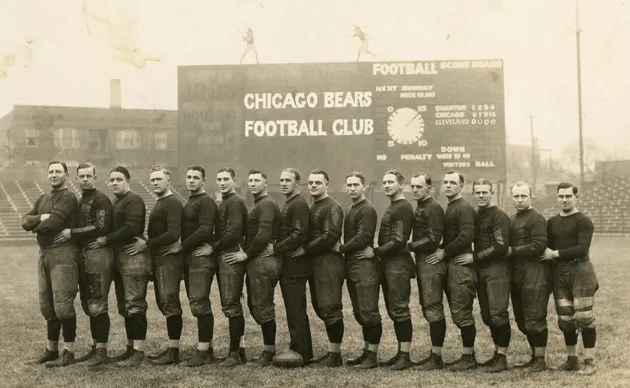
The 1922 Chicago Bears Football Club.

The following individuals saw game action for the 1922 Chicago Bears. The number of games played appears in parentheses.

Two of these players — coach and end George Halas and tackle Ed Healey — were later inducted into the Pro Football Hall of Fame. Bears Hall of Fame center George Trafton was not a member of the 1922 team, as he took a season off to take a position as an assistant coach at Northwestern University.

Linemen

- Hunk Anderson (10)
- Hugh Blacklock (12)
- Bourbon Bondurant (1)
- Harry Englund (3)
- Hec Garvey (12)
- George Halas (12)
- Carl Hanke (2)
- Ed Healey (3) (Started season with Rock Island.)
- Joe LaFleur (10)
- Ojay Larson (10)
- Ralph Scott (12)
- Russ Smith (10)

Backs

- George Bolan (10)
- Jake Lanum (12)
- Pard Pearce (8)
- Dutch Sternaman (11)
- Joey Sternaman (12)
- Pete Stinchcomb (12)
- Laurie Walquist (12)
