= 1922 Akron Pros season =

Sports season

- Owner: Akron Exhibition Co. Charles Stahl
- President: Frank Nied, Art Ranney
- Head coach: Untz Brewer
- Home stadium: Elks' Field

Results
- Record: 3–5–2
- Division place: 10th NFL
- Playoffs: No playoffs until 1932

The 1922 Akron Pros season was their third in the league. The team failed to improve on their previous output of 8–3–1, winning only three games. They finished tenth in the league.

== Schedule ==
Game	Date	Opponent	Result	Record	Venue	Attendance	Recap	Sources
1	October 1	Columbus Panhandles	W 36–0	1–0	Elks' Field	3,000	Recap	
—	October 8	(open date)						
2	October 12	Rochester Jeffersons	T 13–13	1–0–1	Elks' Field	2,000	Recap	
3	October 22	Canton Bulldogs	L 0–22	1–1–1	Elks' Field		Recap	
4	October 29	Oorang Indians	W 62–0	2–1–1	Elks' Field	3,000	Recap	
5	November 5	Hammond Pros	W 22–0	3–1–1	Elks' Field	2,500	Recap	
6	November 12	at Chicago Cardinals	L 0–7	3–2–1	Comiskey Park	2,000	Recap	
7	November 19	at Buffalo All-Americans	T 3–3	3–2–2	Buffalo Baseball Park		Recap	
8	November 26	at Chicago Bears	L 10–20	3–3–2	Cubs Park	6,000	Recap	
9	November 30	at Canton Bulldogs	L 0–14	3–4–2	Lakeside Park		Recap	
10	December 3	at Buffalo All-Americans	L 0–16	3–5–2	Buffalo Baseball Park		Recap	
Note: Jeffersons game postponed from October 8 to 12 because of rain. Thanksgiving Day: November 30.

== Standings ==
NFL standings
	W	L	T	PCT	PF	PA	STK
Canton Bulldogs	10	0	2	1.000	184	15	W6
Chicago Bears	9	3	0	.750	123	44	L1
Chicago Cardinals	8	3	0	.727	96	50	W1
Toledo Maroons	5	2	2	.714	94	59	L2
Rock Island Independents	4	2	1	.667	154	27	L1
Racine Legion	6	4	1	.600	122	56	L1
Dayton Triangles	4	3	1	.571	80	62	W1
Green Bay Packers	4	3	3	.571	70	54	W2
Buffalo All-Americans	5	4	1	.556	87	41	W2
Akron Pros	3	5	2	.375	146	95	L3
Milwaukee Badgers	2	4	3	.333	51	71	L3
Oorang Indians	3	6	0	.333	69	190	W2
Minneapolis Marines	1	3	0	.250	19	40	L1
Louisville Brecks	1	3	0	.250	13	140	W1
Evansville Crimson Giants	0	3	0	.000	6	88	L3
Rochester Jeffersons	0	4	1	.000	13	76	L4
Hammond Pros	0	5	1	.000	0	69	L2
Columbus Panhandles	0	8	0	.000	24	174	L8

Note: Tie games were not officially counted in the standings until 1972.
