= Swede Rundquist =

American football player (1894–1958)

Profile
- Position: Tackle

Personal information
- Born: November 22, 1894; Harvey, Illinois, U.S.
- Died: February 7, 1958 (aged 63); Lackland Air Force Base, Texas, U.S.
- Listed height: 6 ft 2 in (1.88 m)
- Listed weight: 210 lb (95 kg)

Career information
- High school: Thornton Township
- College: Illinois

Career history
- Chicago Cardinals (1922)

Career statistics
- Games played: 10
- Games started: 10
- Touchdowns scored: 0
- Stats at Pro Football Reference

Elmer Theodore "Swede" Rundquist (November 22, 1894 – February 7, 1958) was an American football player. He played 10 games for the Chicago Cardinals in the 1922 NFL season as a tackle.

== Early life and college career ==
Elmer Theodore Rundquist was born on November 22, 1894, in Harvey, Illinois. He was at a high school at Thornton Township, Illinois, until he enrolled into the University of Illinois in 1914, and was with the football team from 1915 to 1917.

== Professional career ==
Rundquist signed with the Chicago Cardinals for the 1922 NFL season, playing in 10 games as a tackle. After the 1922 season, Rundquist would leave the team.

== Personal life and death ==
Rundquist had a son, Peter Anton Rundquist.

On February 7, 1958, Rundquist died at Lackland Air Force Base, at the age of 63.

== See also ==
- 1922 Chicago Cardinals season
