= Spellacy =

Spellacy is a surname. Notable people with the surname include:

- Frank Spellacy (1901–1960), American football player
- James Spellacy (fl. 1880s), English footballer
- Thomas J. Spellacy (1880–1957), an American political leader and lawyer
