= 1922 Rock Island Independents season =

Sports season

- General manager: Walter Flanigan
- Head coach: Jimmy Conzelman
- Home stadium: Douglas Park

Results
- Record: 4–2–1
- League place: 5th in NFL

The 1922 Rock Island Independents season was their third in the league. The team matched their previous output of 4–2–1, finishing fifth in the league. After the season they sent the contract of future Hall of Fame tackle Ed Healey to the Chicago Bears in exchange for $100, making him the first player ever sold in pro football.

== Background ==
The Islanders conducted a two-week training camp ahead of the season on the Rock River, outside of town.

The team again played its home games at Douglas Park in Rock Island. Tickets were priced in four tiers, ranging from 55 cents to $2.20, including war tax, with center section of the grandstand priced at $1.10 and less desirable seats on the east end and in the bleachers on the north side of the field priced lower.

== Sale of Ed Healey ==
After the Islanders completed their seventh and final game of the 1922 season, a losing contest against the Chicago Bears, Independents team owner Walter Flanigan sold the contract of star 28-year old tackle Ed Healey to the team that had just defeated them. Bears co-owner and starting right end George Halas later offered a colorful tale of how the deal was done.

Halas indicated that he was blocking against Healey and did "just a wee bit of holding" to spring star halfback and Bears co-owner Dutch Sternaman for a 7-yard gain. "Holding!" the tough guy Healey allegedly stormed, "You were holding me, Halas! Do that again and I'll knock your block off!" The same play was run again, with Halas using the same illegal technique to generate a similar result. "I was still on my hands and knees," Halas recounted, "when some sixth sense told me to duck.... It's a darned good thing I did, by golly, for Healy's fist whizzed past my nose so fast it buried itself up to the wrist in the ground." Halas stated that "right then I decided I would rather have Healey on my side than playing against me."

As Independents owner Flanagan already owed Halas $100, Halas instead took Healey's contract to settle the debt, he said. Healey would play the last 3 games of the 1922 season with the Bears and would remain with the team for an additional five years, earning induction into the Pro Football Hall of Fame in 1964. The transaction was the first instance of an NFL player's contract being sold from one team to another.

This entertaining story, told by Halas decades after the fact, is contradicted by reporting in the Rock Island Argus at the time of the deal, however. According to the newspaper account, Healey was instead scheduled to be loaned to the Horlick-Racine Legion team for the last three games of the season. Bears co-owner Dutch Sternaman got wind of the free player loan and stepped in to offer Independents owner Flanagan $100 for use of the Healey for the duration of the year.

Provision was made in the contract giving Rock Island the option of buying Healey's contract back for 1923 for the same amount of money or having the transfer made permanent through receipt of one or more players from the Bears in trade. In any event, Healey never returned to Rock Island, remaining in Chicago for the duration of his professional football career.

== Schedule ==
Game	Date	Opponent	Result	Record	Venue	Attendance	Recap	Sources
1	October 1	Green Bay Packers	W 19–14	1–0	Douglas Park	3,500	Recap	
2	October 8	Chicago Bears	L 6–10	1–1	Douglas Park	4,749	Recap	
3	October 15	Evansville Crimson Giants	W 60–0	2–1	Douglas Park	2,000	Recap	
4	October 22	Rochester Jeffersons	W 26–0	3–1	Douglas Park	3,000	Recap	
5	October 29	at Green Bay Packers	T 0–0	3–1–1	Hagemeister Park	8,000	Recap	
—	November 5	at Milwaukee Badgers	canceled due to heavy rain					
6	November 12	Dayton Triangles	W 43–0	4–1–1	Douglas Park	1,200	Recap	
7	November 19	at Chicago Bears	L 0–3	4–2–1	Cubs Park	8,000	Recap	

== Standings ==
Tackle Ed Healey was one of three Pro Football Hall of Famers on the 1922 Rock Island team.

NFL standings
	W	L	T	PCT	PF	PA	STK
Canton Bulldogs	10	0	2	1.000	184	15	W6
Chicago Bears	9	3	0	.750	123	44	L1
Chicago Cardinals	8	3	0	.727	96	50	W1
Toledo Maroons	5	2	2	.714	94	59	L2
Rock Island Independents	4	2	1	.667	154	27	L1
Racine Legion	6	4	1	.600	122	56	L1
Dayton Triangles	4	3	1	.571	80	62	W1
Green Bay Packers	4	3	3	.571	70	54	W2
Buffalo All-Americans	5	4	1	.556	87	41	W2
Akron Pros	3	5	2	.375	146	95	L3
Milwaukee Badgers	2	4	3	.333	51	71	L3
Oorang Indians	3	6	0	.333	69	190	W2
Minneapolis Marines	1	3	0	.250	19	40	L1
Louisville Brecks	1	3	0	.250	13	140	W1
Evansville Crimson Giants	0	3	0	.000	6	88	L3
Rochester Jeffersons	0	4	1	.000	13	76	L4
Hammond Pros	0	5	1	.000	0	69	L2
Columbus Panhandles	0	8	0	.000	24	174	L8

Note: Tie games were not officially counted in the standings until 1972.

== Roster ==
The 1922 Green-and-Whites included the following players. The number of games each played with Rock Island in 1922 follows in parentheses. The team featured three men who would later be enshrined in the Pro Football Hall of Fame — quarterback Jimmy Conzelman as well as linemen Ed Healey and Duke Slater.

Linemen

- Walt Clago (7)
- Jug Earp (2)
- Ed Healey (7) —Sold to the Chicago Bears after the end of the Rock Island season.
- Jerry Jones (7)
- Emmett Keefe (5)
- Louie Kolls (6)
- Ollie Kraehe (3)
- Dewey Lyle (6)
- Duke Slater (7)
- Tillie Voss (7)
- Obe Wenig (6)

Backs

- Lane Bridgford (3)
- Walt Brindley (3)
- Mike Casteel (6)
- Jimmy Conzelman (7)
- Buck Gavin (7)
- Jerry Johnson (5)
- Dutch Lauer (7)
- Eddie Novak (1)
- Eddie Usher (5)
