= Karl George =

Karl George may refer to:

- Karl George (American football) (1894–1979), American football player
- Karl George (musician) (1913–1978), American jazz trumpeter

== See also ==
- George Karl (born 1951), American basketball coach
