= Buck Jones (American football) =

American football player (1888–1985)

No. 30
- Position: End

Personal information
- Born: October 23, 1888; Cattaraugus Reservation, New York, U.S.
- Died: September 8, 1985 (aged 96); Lewiston, New York, U.S.
- Listed height: 6 ft 0 in (1.83 m)
- Listed weight: 210 lb (95 kg)

Career information
- College: Haskell

Career history
- Oorang Indians (1922)
- Stats at Pro Football Reference

Horatio "White Cloud" Jones (October 23, 1888 – September 8, 1985) was an American professional football player who played in the National Football League (NFL) during the 1922 season.

== Biography ==
Jones was born on the Cattaraugus Reservation and attended Haskell Institute. In 1922, he joined the NFL's Oorang Indians for two games. The Indians were an early NFL franchise based in LaRue, Ohio, composed only of Native Americans, and coached by Jim Thorpe.
