= Moxie Dalton =

American football player (1896–1957)

Profile
- Position: Blocking Back

Personal information
- Born: February 22, 1896; Janesville, Wisconsin
- Died: January 29, 1957 (aged 60); Chicago, Illinois

Career information
- College: Carroll (WI), Loras

Career history
- 1922: Racine Legion

Maurice J. "Moxie" Dalton (1896–1957) was a blocking back in the National Football League. He played with the Racine Legion during the 1922 NFL season. He died in 1957 of a heart attack. At the time of his death he worked at an engineering company in Chicago.
