= Red O'Connor =

American football player

No. 24, 15
- Position: End

Personal information
- Listed height: 5 ft 8 in (1.73 m)
- Listed weight: 170 lb (77 kg)

Career information
- College: DePaul

Career history
- Chicago Cardinals (1920–1922, 1924)

Career NFL statistics
- Games played: 16
- Stats at Pro Football Reference

Red O'Connor was an American professional football end who played four seasons in the National Football League (NFL) with the Chicago Cardinals. He played college football at DePaul University.

== Early life ==
Red O'Connor was born in the United States. He played college football for the DePaul Blue Demons of DePaul University.

== Professional career ==
O'Connor played in three games, starting one, for the Chicago Cardinals of the American Professional Football Association (APFA) during the league's inaugural 1920 season. He appeared in five games, starting four, in 1921. He played in five games, starting four, for the second consecutive year for the Cardinals of the newly-renamed National Football League in 1922. O'Connor played in three games, all starts, for Chicago during the 1924 season. He wore jersey number 24 during his pro football career, except for in 1922 when he wore number 15. He stood 5'8" and weighed 170 pounds. O'Connor was listed as an end while with the Cardinals.
