= 1922 Toledo Maroons season =

Sports season

- Head coach: Guil Falcon
- Home stadium: Swayne Field

Results
- Record: 5–2–2
- Division place: 4th NFL
- Playoffs: No playoffs until 1932

The 1922 Toledo Maroons season was their inaugural season in the National Football League. The team finished 5–2–2, finishing fourth in the league.

== Schedule ==
Game	Date	Opponent	Result	Record	Venue	Attendance	Recap	Sources
1	October 1	Evansville Crimson Giants	W 15–0	1–0	Swayne Field	2,000	Recap	
2	October 8	Milwaukee Badgers	T 12–12	1–0–1	Swayne Field	2,000	Recap	
3	October 15	Hammond Pros	W 14–0	2–0–1	Swayne Field	2,000	Recap	
4	October 22	at Racine Legion	W 7–0	3–0–1	Horlick Field	3,500	Recap	
5	October 29	Louisville Brecks	W 39–0	4–0–1	Swayne Field	2,500	Recap	
6	November 5	at Canton Bulldogs	T 0–0	4–0–2	Lakeside Park		Recap	
—	November 12	(open date)					—	
—	November 19	(open date)					—	
7	November 26	Columbus Panhandles	W 7–6	5–0–2	Swayne Field	1,700	Recap	
8	December 3	at Chicago Bears	L 0–22	5–1–2	Cubs Park		Recap	
9	December 10	Canton Bulldogs	L 0–19	5–2–2	Swayne Field	5,000	Recap	

== Standings ==
NFL standings
	W	L	T	PCT	PF	PA	STK
Canton Bulldogs	10	0	2	1.000	184	15	W6
Chicago Bears	9	3	0	.750	123	44	L1
Chicago Cardinals	8	3	0	.727	96	50	W1
Toledo Maroons	5	2	2	.714	94	59	L2
Rock Island Independents	4	2	1	.667	154	27	L1
Racine Legion	6	4	1	.600	122	56	L1
Dayton Triangles	4	3	1	.571	80	62	W1
Green Bay Packers	4	3	3	.571	70	54	W2
Buffalo All-Americans	5	4	1	.556	87	41	W2
Akron Pros	3	5	2	.375	146	95	L3
Milwaukee Badgers	2	4	3	.333	51	71	L3
Oorang Indians	3	6	0	.333	69	190	W2
Minneapolis Marines	1	3	0	.250	19	40	L1
Louisville Brecks	1	3	0	.250	13	140	W1
Evansville Crimson Giants	0	3	0	.000	6	88	L3
Rochester Jeffersons	0	4	1	.000	13	76	L4
Hammond Pros	0	5	1	.000	0	69	L2
Columbus Panhandles	0	8	0	.000	24	174	L8

Note: Tie games were not officially counted in the standings until 1972.
