= Harry Englund =

American football player (1900–1989)

No. `5
- Position: End / Halfback

Personal information
- Born: August 13, 1900; Rockford, Illinois, U.S.
- Died: March 16, 1989 (aged 88); Rockford, Illinois, U.S.
- Listed height: 6 ft 0 in (1.83 m)
- Listed weight: 185 lb (84 kg)

Career information
- High school: Central (Rockford, Illinois)
- College: None

Career history
- Chicago Staleys/Bears (1921–1922); Chicago Bears (1924)*
- * Offseason or practice squad member only

Awards and highlights
- APFA champion (1921)
- Stats at Pro Football Reference

Harry Cornelius "Skin" Englund (August 13, 1900 – March 16, 1989) was an American professional football end who played two seasons with the Chicago Staleys/Bears and of the National Football League (NFL).

== Early life ==
Harry Cornelius Englund was born on August 13, 1900, in Rockford, Illinois. He attended Rockford Central High School in Rockford. He did not play college football.

== Professional career ==
Englund signed with the Chicago Staleys of the American Professional Football Association (APFA) on September 14, 1921. He played in five games for the Staleys during the 1921 season. The Staleys finished the season in first place in the APFA with a 9–1–1 record and were named APFA champions. Englund appeared in 11 games, starting three, for the newly-renamed Chicago Bears in 1922. The Bears finished the year with a 9–3 record, good for second place in the NFL.

Englund signed with the Bears again in 1924 but was released later that year.

== Personal life ==
Englund also played basketball for the Belvidere Union club and the Rockford Thomas Cats as a guard during the 1920s. He was nicknamed "Skin". Englund died on March 16, 1989, in Rockford.
