= Dudley Pearson =

American football player (1896–1982)

No. 3
- Position: Quarterback

Personal information
- Born: February 8, 1896; Appleton, Wisconsin
- Died: September 3, 1982 (aged 86); Milwaukee, Wisconsin
- Listed height: 5 ft 9 in (1.75 m)

Career information
- High school: Chippewa Falls (WI)
- College: Notre Dame

Career history
- Racine Legion (1922)

Career statistics
- Games played: 4
- Starts: 2
- Stats at Pro Football Reference

Dudley Lester "Dud" Pearson (February 8, 1896 – September 3, 1982) was a player in the National Football League for Racine Legion in 1922. He played at the collegiate level at the University of Notre Dame.

== Biography ==
Dudley Lester Pearson was born on February 8, 1896, in Outagamie County, Wisconsin.

He died in Milwaukee.
