= Tubby Howard =

American football player (1894–1969)

No. 28
- Position: Linebacker

Personal information
- Born: June 10, 1894; Mondovi, Wisconsin, U.S.
- Died: May 30, 1969 (aged 74); Pierce County, Wisconsin, U.S.
- Listed height: 5 ft 10 in (1.78 m)
- Listed weight: 210 lb (95 kg)

Career information
- College: Ripon; Wisconsin; Indiana

Career history
- Green Bay Packers (1921–1922)

Career statistics
- Games played: 12
- Touchdowns: 1
- Stats at Pro Football Reference

Lynn "Tubby" Howard (June 10, 1894 – May 30, 1969) was a player in the National Football League.

Howard was born and lived in Mondovi, Wisconsin. He played with the Green Bay Packers for two seasons. He played at the collegiate level at Indiana University, Ripon College, and the University of Wisconsin-Madison.
