= Wally Sieb =

American football player (1899–1974)

Profile
- Position: Halfback

Personal information
- Born: May 6, 1899; Butternut, Wisconsin, US
- Died: January 18, 1974 (aged 74); Racine, Wisconsin, US

Career information
- High school: Racine (WI)
- College: Ripon

Career history
- Racine Legion (1922)

Career statistics
- Games played: 2
- Extra points made: 1
- Stats at Pro Football Reference

Walter John "Wally" Sieb (May 6, 1899 – January 18, 1974) was an American football halfback for the Racine Legion of the National Football League (NFL) in 1922. He played at the collegiate level at Ripon College.

== Biography ==
Sieb was born on May 6, 1899, in Butternut, Wisconsin. He died on January 18, 1974.
