= Ted Lone Wolf =

No. 22, 11
- Position: Tackle / Guard

Personal information
- Born: Flandreau, South Dakota, United States
- Died: Unknown
- Listed height: 6 ft 2 in (1.88 m)
- Listed weight: 212 lb (96 kg)

Career information
- College: None

Career history
- Oorang Indians (1922–1923)
- Stats at Pro Football Reference

Ted Lone Wolf was a professional football player during the early years of the National Football League. He grew up and attended high school in his hometown of Flandreau, South Dakota. During his two-year career, Ted played in eleven games with the Oorang Indians. He played in seven games for the 1922 season and in four games for the 1923 season. Ted ended his professional career after the Indians disbanded in 1923.
