= Len Charpier =

American football player (1897–1947)

Profile
- Positions: Fullback, halfback, guard

Personal information
- Born: February 17, 1897; Chicago, Illinois, U.S.
- Died: October 3, 1947 (aged 50); Evergreen Park, Illinois, U.S.
- Listed height: 5 ft 10 in (1.78 m)
- Listed weight: 235 lb (107 kg)

Career information
- College: Illinois

Career history
- Pullman Thorns (1918-1919); Chicago Thorns-Tornadoes (1920); Chicago Cardinals (1920)

Awards and highlights
- National champion (1919)

Career statistics
- Games played: 1
- Stats at Pro Football Reference

Leonard Louis Charpier (February 17, 1897 – October 3, 1947) was an American football player. He was sometimes known by the nickname "Tank" and was "rated as one of the hardest hitting fullbacks who ever donned a moleskin."

Charpier was born in 1897 in Chicago. He attended the University of Illinois where he played freshman football as a guard in 1915 and varsity football, again as a guard, in 1916. He was selected by Walter Eckersall on the 1916 all-conference team. In 1917, he played at the fullback position for Illinois. The Daily Illini noted at the time: "Being almost as broad as he is tall he is rather hard to tackle and it must be an almost perfect tackle to bring him down. . . . The real superiority of Charpier lies in his ability to run ends. The opponents are never sure when he intends to punt or run."

He later played semipro football as a fullback position for the Pullman Thorns from 1918 to 1919 and the combined Chicago Thorns-Tornadoes team in 1920.

He also appeared in one game for the Chicago Cardinals of the National Football League (NFL) at the end of the 1920 season. He appeared as the right halfback position for the Cardinals in a loss to the Chicago Staleys on December 5, 1920.

Charpier later became a medical doctor, working in the Roseland section of Chicago for more than 25 years. He died in 1947 of a heart attack at the Little Mary of Hospital in Evergreen Park, Illinois.

== See also ==
- List of players who appeared in only one game in the NFL (1920–1929)
