= Vic Endress =

American football player (1903–1970)

Profile
- Position: Blocking back

Personal information
- Born: May 25, 1903; Evansville, Indiana, U.S.
- Died: August 29, 1970 (aged 67); Moline, Illinois, U.S.

Career information
- High school: Evansville Central (IN)
- College: None

Career history
- Evansville Crimson Giants (1922)

Career statistics
- Games played: 1
- Games started: 1
- Stats at Pro Football Reference

Victor F. Endress (May 25, 1903 – August 29, 1970) was an American football blocking back who played one season in the National Football League (NFL) for the Evansville Crimson Giants.

Endress was born on May 25, 1903, in Evansville, Indiana. He attended Evansville Central High School there, and skipped college at the opportunity to play professional football. In 1922, at the age of 19, he played for the Evansville Crimson Giants in the NFL, starting one game at the blocking back position. Evansville finished the season 0–3, and folded after the season, ending his career with just one appearance at the professional level.

In 1933, Endress was arrested and charged with robbing the safe from his father's grocery store in Evansville. He pled guilty and was sentenced to one to ten years at the state reformatory.

Endress moved to the Moline, Illinois area in 1939. He worked there as a carpenter. He died in 1970 at the age of 67 at Moline Public Hospital.
