= Clyde Zoia =

American football player (1896–1955)

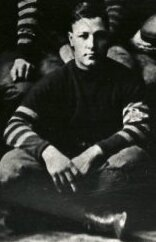
- Zoia with the Chicago Cardinals in 1920

Profile
- Position: Guard

Personal information
- Born: May 16, 1896; Preston, Minnesota, U.S.
- Died: April 3, 1955 (aged 58)
- Listed height: 5 ft 7 in (1.70 m)
- Listed weight: 175 lb (79 kg)

Career information
- High school: Woodstock (IL)
- College: Notre Dame

Career history
- Chicago Cardinals (1920–1923)

Awards and highlights
- First-team All-Pro (1923)
- Stats at Pro Football Reference

Clyde John Zoia (May 16, 1896 – April 3, 1955) was an American professional football guard who played four seasons with the Chicago Cardinals of the National Football League (NFL). He played college football at the University of Notre Dame.

== Early life and college ==
Clyde John Zoia was born on May 16, 1896, in Preston, Minnesota. He attended Woodstock High School in Woodstock, Illinois.

Zoia lettered for the Notre Dame Fighting Irish in 1917.

== Professional career ==
Zoia signed with the Chicago Cardinals of the American Professional Football Association (APFA) in 1920. He played in eight games, starting three, during the 1920 APFA season. (Note: Pro Football Archives has different game totals for Zoia than Pro Football Reference for 1920, 1921, and 1922.) He appeared in eight games, starting six, in 1921. The APFA was renamed the National Football League (NFL) in 1922 and Zoia played in seven games, all starts, during the 1922 NFL season. He played in 11 games, starting nine, during his final season in 1923 and was named a first-team All-Pro by the Canton Daily News. He became a free agent on August 1, 1924.

== Later life ==
Zoia died on April 3, 1955.
