= Vincent Shekleton =

American football player (1896–1958)

Profile
- Position: Center

Personal information
- Born: November 16, 1896; Lawler, Iowa, US
- Died: April 23, 1958 (aged 61); Milwaukee, Wisconsin, US
- Listed height: 5 ft 8 in (1.73 m)
- Listed weight: 165 lb (75 kg)

Career information
- High school: Dubuque (IA)
- College: Colgate, Marquette

Career history
- Racine Legion (1922)

Career statistics
- Games played: 3
- Games started: 3
- Stats at Pro Football Reference

Vincent S. Shekleton (November 16, 1896 – April 23, 1958) was an American football center for the Racine Legion of the National Football League (NFL) during the 1922 NFL season. He played at the collegiate level at Colgate and Marquette.

== Biography ==
Shekleton was born on November 16, 1896, in Lawler, Iowa, and died on April 23, 1958, in Milwaukee, Wisconsin.
