= Jack Nason =

American football player (1899–1977)

No. 28, 16
- Position: Tackle / Wingback

Personal information
- Born: April 8, 1899; Topeka, Kansas
- Died: March 9, 1977 (aged 77); Wichita, Kansas
- Listed height: 5 ft 8 in (1.73 m)
- Listed weight: 185 lb (84 kg)

Career history
- Oorang Indians (1922–1923)
- Stats at Pro Football Reference

Edward Earl "Jack" Nason aka Running Deer (April 8, 1899 - March 9, 1977) was a professional football player who played in the National Football League during the 1922 and 1923 seasons. He joined the NFL's Oorang Indians. The Indians were a team based in LaRue, Ohio, composed only of Native Americans, and coached by Jim Thorpe.
