= Buddy Baumann (American football) =

American football player (1900–1951)

Profile
- Position: Tackle / Guard

Personal information
- Born: August 4, 1900; Racine, Wisconsin, U.S.
- Died: April 27, 1951 (aged 50)
- Listed height: 6 ft 1 in (1.85 m)
- Listed weight: 190 lb (86 kg)

Career information
- College: None

Career history
- Racine Legion (1922)

Career statistics
- Games played: 4
- Stats at Pro Football Reference

Carl M. "Buddy" Baumann (August 4, 1900 – April 27, 1951) was an American football player in the National Football League who played with the Racine Legion during the 1922 NFL season.
