= 1922 Hammond Pros season =

Sports season

- Owner: "Doc" Alva Young
- Head coach: Wally Hess
- Home stadium: None (Traveling team)

Results
- Record: 0–5–1 (NFL); 1–6–1 (overall)
- League place: T-15th NFL

The 1922 Hammond Pros season was their third in the league. The team failed to improve on their previous output of 1–3–1, losing five games. They tied for fifteenth place in the league. The team was shut out in all six of their games.

== Schedule ==
Week	Date	Opponent	Result	Record	Venue	Attendance	Recap	Sources
1	October 1	at Buffalo All-Americans	L 0–7	0–1	Buffalo Baseball Park	4,500	Recap	
—	October 8	at Chicago Cardinals	canceled due to rain					
2	October 15	at Toledo Maroons	L 0–14	0–2	Swayne Field	2,000	Recap	
3	October 22	at Dayton Triangles	L 0–20	0–3	Triangle Park		Recap	
4	October 29	at Milwaukee Badgers	T 0–0	0–3–1	Athletic Park		Recap	
5	November 5	at Akron Pros	L 0–22	0–4–1	Elks' Field	2,500	Recap	
—	November 12	at Gary Elks	W 15–0	—	Gleason Field	5,000	—	
—	November 19	at Gary Elks	L 6–9	—	Gleason Field		—	
6	November 26	at Racine Legion	L 0–6	0–5–1	Horlick Field	1,034	Recap	

== Standings ==
NFL standings
	W	L	T	PCT	PF	PA	STK
Canton Bulldogs	10	0	2	1.000	184	15	W6
Chicago Bears	9	3	0	.750	123	44	L1
Chicago Cardinals	8	3	0	.727	96	50	W1
Toledo Maroons	5	2	2	.714	94	59	L2
Rock Island Independents	4	2	1	.667	154	27	L1
Racine Legion	6	4	1	.600	122	56	L1
Dayton Triangles	4	3	1	.571	80	62	W1
Green Bay Packers	4	3	3	.571	70	54	W2
Buffalo All-Americans	5	4	1	.556	87	41	W2
Akron Pros	3	5	2	.375	146	95	L3
Milwaukee Badgers	2	4	3	.333	51	71	L3
Oorang Indians	3	6	0	.333	69	190	W2
Minneapolis Marines	1	3	0	.250	19	40	L1
Louisville Brecks	1	3	0	.250	13	140	W1
Evansville Crimson Giants	0	3	0	.000	6	88	L3
Rochester Jeffersons	0	4	1	.000	13	76	L4
Hammond Pros	0	5	1	.000	0	69	L2
Columbus Panhandles	0	8	0	.000	24	174	L8

Note: Tie games were not officially counted in the standings until 1972.
