= Gus Gardella =

American football player (1895–1974)

Profile
- Position: Fullback

Personal information
- Born: October 15, 1895; Worcester, Massachusetts, US
- Died: December 26, 1974 (aged 79); Worcester, Massachusetts, US
- Listed height: 5 ft 6 in (1.68 m)
- Listed weight: 190 lb (86 kg)

Career information
- College: None

Career history
- Green Bay Packers (1922)

Career statistics
- Games played: 7
- Games started: 3
- Stats at Pro Football Reference

Anthony Joseph "Siki" Gardella (October 15, 1895 – December 26, 1974) was an American football fullback for the Green Bay Packers of the National Football League (NFL).

== Biography ==
Gardella was born on October 15, 1895, in Worcester, Massachusetts. He died there in 1974.
