= 1922 Milwaukee Badgers season =

Sports season

- Head coach: Jimmy Conzelman and Budge Garrett
- Home stadium: Athletic Park

Results
- Record: 2–4–3
- League place: 11th in NFL

The 1922 Milwaukee Badgers season was their inaugural season in the National Football League (NFL). The Badgers finished with a record of 2–4–3, eleventh in the league.

== Schedule ==
Week	Date	Opponent	Result	Record	Venue	Attendance	Recap	Sources
1	October 1	at Chicago Cardinals	L 0–3	0–1	Normal Park	3,500	Recap	
2	October 8	at Toledo Maroons	T 12–12	0–1–1	Swayne Field	2,000	Recap	
3	October 15	Racine Legion	W 20–0	1–1–1	Athletic Park	6,000	Recap	
4	October 22	Green Bay Packers	T 0–0	1–1–2	Athletic Park	6,000	Recap	
5	October 29	Hammond Pros	T 0–0	1–1–3	Athletic Park		Recap	
—	November 5	Rock Island Independents	canceled due to heavy rain					
—	November 12	(open date)						
6	November 19	Oorang Indians	W 13–0	2–1–3	Athletic Park	6,500	Recap	
7	November 26	at Green Bay Packers	L 0–13	2–2–3	Hagemeister Park		Recap	
8	November 30	at Racine Legion	L 0–3	2–3–3	Horlick Field	3,500	Recap	
9	December 3	at Canton Bulldogs	L 6–40	2–4–3	Lakeside Park		Recap	
Note: Games in italics indicate a non-league opponent. Thanksgiving Day: November 30.

== Standings ==
NFL standings
	W	L	T	PCT	PF	PA	STK
Canton Bulldogs	10	0	2	1.000	184	15	W6
Chicago Bears	9	3	0	.750	123	44	L1
Chicago Cardinals	8	3	0	.727	96	50	W1
Toledo Maroons	5	2	2	.714	94	59	L2
Rock Island Independents	4	2	1	.667	154	27	L1
Racine Legion	6	4	1	.600	122	56	L1
Dayton Triangles	4	3	1	.571	80	62	W1
Green Bay Packers	4	3	3	.571	70	54	W2
Buffalo All-Americans	5	4	1	.556	87	41	W2
Akron Pros	3	5	2	.375	146	95	L3
Milwaukee Badgers	2	4	3	.333	51	71	L3
Oorang Indians	3	6	0	.333	69	190	W2
Minneapolis Marines	1	3	0	.250	19	40	L1
Louisville Brecks	1	3	0	.250	13	140	W1
Evansville Crimson Giants	0	3	0	.000	6	88	L3
Rochester Jeffersons	0	4	1	.000	13	76	L4
Hammond Pros	0	5	1	.000	0	69	L2
Columbus Panhandles	0	8	0	.000	24	174	L8

Note: Tie games were not officially counted in the standings until 1972.
