= 1922 Louisville Brecks season =

Sports season

- Head coach: Hubert Wiggs

Results
- Record: 1–3
- League place: 13th NFL

The 1922 Louisville Brecks season was their second season in the league. The team improved on their previous output of 0–2, winning one game. They finished thirteenth in the league.

== Schedule ==
| Game | Date | Opponent | Result | Record | Venue | Attendance | Recap | Sources |
|---|---|---|---|---|---|---|---|---|
| 1 | October 1 | at Canton Bulldogs | L 0–38 | 0–1 | Lakeside Park | 3,000 | Recap | |
| — | October 8 | (open date) | | | | | — | |
| — | October 15 | (open date) | | | | | — | |
| — | October 22 | (open date) | | | | | — | |
| 2 | October 29 | at Toledo Maroons | L 0–39 | 0–2 | Swayne Field | | Recap | |
| 3 | November 5 | at Racine Legion | L 0–57 | 0–3 | Horlick Field | | Recap | |
| 4 | November 12 | Evansville Crimson Giants | W 13–6 | 1–3 | Kentucky Fairgrounds | | Recap | |
| — | November 19 | (open date) | | | | | — | |
| — | November 26 | (open date) | | | | | — | |

== Standings ==
NFL standings
| | W | L | T | PCT | PF | PA | STK |
|---|---|---|---|---|---|---|---|
| Canton Bulldogs | 10 | 0 | 2 | 1.000 | 184 | 15 | W6 |
| Chicago Bears | 9 | 3 | 0 | .750 | 123 | 44 | L1 |
| Chicago Cardinals | 8 | 3 | 0 | .727 | 96 | 50 | W1 |
| Toledo Maroons | 5 | 2 | 2 | .714 | 94 | 59 | L2 |
| Rock Island Independents | 4 | 2 | 1 | .667 | 154 | 27 | L1 |
| Racine Legion | 6 | 4 | 1 | .600 | 122 | 56 | L1 |
| Dayton Triangles | 4 | 3 | 1 | .571 | 80 | 62 | W1 |
| Green Bay Packers | 4 | 3 | 3 | .571 | 70 | 54 | W2 |
| Buffalo All-Americans | 5 | 4 | 1 | .556 | 87 | 41 | W2 |
| Akron Pros | 3 | 5 | 2 | .375 | 146 | 95 | L3 |
| Milwaukee Badgers | 2 | 4 | 3 | .333 | 51 | 71 | L3 |
| Oorang Indians | 3 | 6 | 0 | .333 | 69 | 190 | W2 |
| Minneapolis Marines | 1 | 3 | 0 | .250 | 19 | 40 | L1 |
| Louisville Brecks | 1 | 3 | 0 | .250 | 13 | 140 | W1 |
| Evansville Crimson Giants | 0 | 3 | 0 | .000 | 6 | 88 | L3 |
| Rochester Jeffersons | 0 | 4 | 1 | .000 | 13 | 76 | L4 |
| Hammond Pros | 0 | 5 | 1 | .000 | 0 | 69 | L2 |
| Columbus Panhandles | 0 | 8 | 0 | .000 | 24 | 174 | L8 |

Note: Tie games were not officially counted in the standings until 1972.
