= 1922 Buffalo All-Americans season =

Sports season

- Head coach: Tommy Hughitt
- Home stadium: Buffalo Baseball Park

Results
- Record: 5–4–1
- Division place: 9th NFL
- Playoffs: No playoffs until 1932

The 1922 Buffalo All-Americans season was their third in the league. The team failed to improve on their previous output of 9–1–2. They finished ninth in the league.

== Schedule ==
Game	Date	Opponent	Result	Record	Venue	Attendance	Recap	Sources
1	October 1	Hammond Pros	W 7–0	1–0	Buffalo Baseball Park	4,500	Recap	
—	October 8	(open date)						
2	October 15	Columbus Panhandles	W 19–0	2–0	Buffalo Baseball Park		Recap	
3	October 22	at Chicago Bears	L 0–7	2–1	Cubs Park	6,500	Recap	
4	October 29	at Dayton Triangles	W 7–0	3–1	Triangle Park	5,000	Recap	
5	November 5	at Chicago Cardinals	L 7–9	3–2	Comiskey Park	4,000	Recap	
6	November 12	at Canton Bulldogs	L 0–3	3–3	Lakeside Park	2,000	Recap	
7	November 19	Akron Pros	T 3–3	3–3–1	Buffalo Baseball Park		Recap	
8	November 26	Oorang Indians	L 7–19	3–4–1	Buffalo Baseball Park	3,000	Recap	
9	November 30	at Rochester Jeffersons	W 21–0	4–4–1	Edgerton Park	2,500	Recap	
10	December 3	Akron Pros	W 16–0	5–4–1	Buffalo Baseball Park		Recap	
Note: Thanksgiving Day: November 30.

== Standings ==
NFL standings
	W	L	T	PCT	PF	PA	STK
Canton Bulldogs	10	0	2	1.000	184	15	W6
Chicago Bears	9	3	0	.750	123	44	L1
Chicago Cardinals	8	3	0	.727	96	50	W1
Toledo Maroons	5	2	2	.714	94	59	L2
Rock Island Independents	4	2	1	.667	154	27	L1
Racine Legion	6	4	1	.600	122	56	L1
Dayton Triangles	4	3	1	.571	80	62	W1
Green Bay Packers	4	3	3	.571	70	54	W2
Buffalo All-Americans	5	4	1	.556	87	41	W2
Akron Pros	3	5	2	.375	146	95	L3
Milwaukee Badgers	2	4	3	.333	51	71	L3
Oorang Indians	3	6	0	.333	69	190	W2
Minneapolis Marines	1	3	0	.250	19	40	L1
Louisville Brecks	1	3	0	.250	13	140	W1
Evansville Crimson Giants	0	3	0	.000	6	88	L3
Rochester Jeffersons	0	4	1	.000	13	76	L4
Hammond Pros	0	5	1	.000	0	69	L2
Columbus Panhandles	0	8	0	.000	24	174	L8

Note: Tie games were not officially counted in the standings until 1972.

== Roster ==
The following players saw action in at least one NFL game as a member of the Buffalo All-Americans. Total number of NFL games played in 1922 follows in parentheses.

Linemen

- Bill Brace (10)
- Herb Dieter (9)
- Gus Goetz (7)
- Charlie Guy (10)
- Glenn Knack (1)
- Frank Morrissey (10)
- Bob Nash (2)
- Frank Spellacy (1)
- Carl Thomas (9)
- Luke Urban (9)
- Jim Wilson (4)
- Swede Youngstrom (10)

Backs

- Ockie Anderson (7)
- Buck Gavin (3)
- Tommy Hughitt (10)
- Bill Kibler (2)
- Waddy Kuehl (10)
- Jim Laird(10)
- Jim Morrow (1)
- Bob Rawlings (6)
- Johnny Scott (1)
