= Art Braman =

American football player (1897–1967)

Profile
- Position: Tackle

Personal information
- Born: August 4, 1897; Torrington, Connecticut
- Died: August 12, 1967 (aged 70); Carmel Highlands, California
- Listed height: 5 ft 11 in (1.80 m)
- Listed weight: 215 lb (98 kg)

Career information
- High school: Phillips Exeter (NH)
- College: Yale

Career history
- Racine Legion (1922–1923)

Career statistics
- Games: 14

Arthur Henry Braman (August 4, 1897 – August 12, 1967) was an American football player.

Braman was born in Torrington, Connecticut, in 1897. He attended Phillips Exeter Academy in New Hampshire. He was elected captain of the 1916 Phillip Exeter football team. He later played college football for Yale.

He also professional football as a tackle for the Racine Legion in the National Football League (NFL). He appeared in 14 NFL games, 13 as a starter, during the 1922 and 1923 seasons.

He died in 1967 in Carmel Highlands, California.
