= Candy Miller =

American football player (1898–1988)

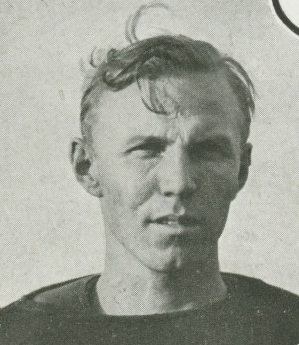
- Miller from 1922 Purdue yearbook

Profile
- Positions: Tackle, End, Halfback, Fullback

Personal information
- Born: June 7, 1898; Rochester, Indiana, United States
- Died: November 3, 1986 (aged 88); Frankfort, Indiana, United States
- Listed height: 6 ft 3 in (1.91 m)
- Listed weight: 215 lb (98 kg)

Career information
- High school: Rochester (IN)
- College: Purdue University

Career history
- Canton Bulldogs (1922); Racine Legion (1922–1923)

Awards and highlights
- Won 1922 NFL Championship

Career statistics
- Games played: 17
- Starts: 15
- Touchdowns: 1
- Stats at Pro Football Reference

Raymond Frederick "Candy" Miller (June 7, 1898 – November 3, 1986) was a professional football player who spent two years in the National Football League (NFL) with the Canton Bulldogs and the Racine Legion. Miller was a part of the Bulldogs' 1922 NFL championship team.

While he played professional football, Miller is best remembered as an All-American basketball player, helping to lead Purdue to a 1920–21 national basketball championship. He was inducted into the Indiana Basketball Hall of Fame in 1980.

== Biography ==
Ray "Candy" Miller was born June 7, 1898, in Rochester, Indiana. He attended Rochester High School, where he was a four sport athlete, starring in baseball, football, track, and basketball. Miller was named an Indiana All-State basketball player in 1918 and won the state long jump championship that same year.

He was briefly in the United States Army following graduation and remained active in the American Legion throughout his life.

Miller attended Purdue University, where he continued to play all three sports. He excelled particularly at basketball, where he was named an All-Conference guard for two seasons. He helped Purdue win a 1920–21 national basketball championship and was named an All-American in basketball in 1922.

Miller graduated from Purdue in 1922 with a degree in civil engineering.

After graduation, he tried his hand at professional football, becoming a member of the Canton Bulldogs of the National Football League in 1922 before moving to the NFL's Horlick-Racine Legion, for whom he started at right tackle. He played with the Racine club during the 1923 season as well, before moving to Huntington, Indiana to take a position in the engineering department of the Erie Railroad.

After his time on the railroad, Miller moved to Frankfort, Indiana, where he worked as a city engineer and building inspector.

Miller was inducted into the Indiana Basketball Hall of Fame in 1980.

"Candy" Miller died in Frankfort on November 3, 1986. He was 88 years old at the time of his death.
