= Alex Bobidosh =

American football player (1890–1981)

Alex Bobadash
Profile
- Position: End

Personal information
- Born: September 9, 1890; Lac du Flambeau, Wisconsin, U.S.
- Died: September 11, 1981 (aged 91)

Career history
- Oorang Indians (1922)
- Stats at Pro Football Reference

Alex Bobidosh (September 9, 1890 – September 11, 1981) was a professional football player. He played in one game in the National Football League (NFL) during the 1922 season with the Oorang Indians. The Indians were a team based in LaRue, Ohio, composed only of Native Americans, and coached by Jim Thorpe.
