= Elmer Rhenstrom =

American football player (1894–1976)

- Rhenstrom during the 1922 season

Profile
- Position: End

Personal information
- Born: August 11, 1895; Kenosha, Wisconsin, U.S.
- Died: December 27, 1967 (aged 72); Ontario, California, U.S.
- Listed height: 5 ft 10 in (1.78 m)
- Listed weight: 185 lb (84 kg)

Career information
- College: Beloit

Career history
- Racine Legion (1922)

Career statistics
- Games played: 6
- Starts: 3
- Stats at Pro Football Reference

Elmer Gustaf "Swede" Rhenstrom (August 18, 1895 – December 26, 1967) was World War I fighter pilot, professional football player, and airline manager.

Rhenstrom was an end for the inaugural Horlick-Racine Legion team in the National Football League (NFL) in 1922.

== Biography ==
Elmer Rhenstrom, known to his friends as "Swede", was born in Kenosha, Wisconsin. He was the son of Anthony Rhenstrom (1865–1955) and Emma Stahl Rhenstrom (1866–1939), both immigrants from Sweden.

Rhenstrom served as a pilot in France during the First World War, where he shot down two (unofficially three) enemy aircraft, for which he was referred to as an ace. He was awarded the Silver Star for his activity during the Great War in October 1941, on the eve of American entry into World War II.

After the war, enrolled at Beloit College in Beloit, Wisconsin, where he played football. He married Dorothy Virginia Miles in 1920.

In 1922, he signed on with the Racine Post of the American Legion to play football for their professional football team — the Racine Legion of the National Football League.

In 1928 he joined Fairfield Aviation in Riverside, Ohio, and in 1929 he became a manager at Texas Air Transport Inc.

In the 1940s he was an officer at Scott Field near Belleville, Illinois.
