= Herb Dell =

American football official and coach (1889–1964)

Personal information
- Born: January 28, 1889; Columbus, Ohio, U.S.
- Died: January 10, 1964 (aged 74); Florida, U.S.

Career information
- College: Oberlin

Career history
- Columbus Panhandles (1922) Head coach

Head coaching record
- Regular season: 0–8–0 (.000)
- Coaching profile at Pro Football Reference

Herbert Edward Dell (January 28, 1889 – January 10, 1964) was an American football official and coach. He served as the coach of the Columbus Panhandles in the 1922 season, compiling a record of 0–8.

== Biography ==
Dell was born on January 28, 1889, in Columbus, Ohio. He lived in Columbus for many years and was a graduate of Oberlin College. According to the Green Bay Press-Gazette, he had a short stint playing professional football. He began officiating games as early as in 1911, when he was 22 years old. Dell often was an official for games of the Columbus Panhandles, a team owned and coached by his friend Joseph Carr.

Early in his career, Dell received some negative reports on his refereeing, with one article from The Dayton Herald in 1913 noting that "Referee Dell was partly to blame for the lack of system ... He didn't know the rules as well as an official should." A 1917 article was more positive, commenting that he officiated in "a fair and impartial manner". In addition to football, Dell also at times served as a referee in other sports.

Dell was hired as an umpire in the inaugural season of the American Professional Football Association (APFA), what is now known as the National Football League (NFL). He added the duty of being a field judge in 1921.

In 1922, after the Columbus Panhandles' coach Ted Nesser retired, Joseph Carr hired Dell to replace him. The Nesser brothers had been the core of the team for many years and all but one of them had left the team following the 1921 season. As a result, the 1922 Panhandles finished with a disastrous record of 0–8, being outscored 24 points to 174 while placing last in the league. He did not remain their coach after the season, as Carr then sold the team to a group of investors who renamed them the Columbus Tigers.

Dell never coached professionally again, but continued officiating in the NFL, serving as an umpire through 1923, a referee and head linesman in 1924, and as referee and umpire in 1925, which was followed by a two-year lapse of serving. He returned at the referee position in 1928, then missed the 1929 season, and served at various times as a head linesman, umpire and field judge in the following four years before ending his NFL officiating career in 1934. Dell served a total of 11 seasons in the NFL and his professional refereeing career spanned 23 seasons (1911–1933). He later served in the United States Army in World War II, having enlisted at age 53, and died on January 10, 1964, at the age of 74.
