= Baptiste Thunder =

American football player (1891–1935)

No. 16
- Position: Tackle

Personal information
- Born: February 23, 1891; Minnesota, U.S.
- Died: December 17, 1935 (aged 44); Red Lake Indian Reservation, Minnesota, U.S.
- Listed height: 5 ft 10 in (1.78 m)
- Listed weight: 215 lb (98 kg)

Career information
- College: None

Career history
- Oorang Indians (1922)
- Stats at Pro Football Reference

John Baptiste Thunder (February 23, 1891 - December 17, 1935) was a professional football player who played in the National Football League (NFL) during the 1922 season. That season, he joined the NFL's Oorang Indians. The Indians were a team based in LaRue, Ohio, composed only of Native Americans, and coached by Jim Thorpe. Thunder was a Chippewa.

== Family ==
The son of Joseph Thunder and Nancy Greely, Baptiste was married three times. First he married Isabella Neadeau in 1913 with whom who he had four daughters from 1913 until 1919; Edna Victoria, Dorothy Louisa, Susan Alice and Margaret Josephine. In the early 1920s he married an unknown woman with whom he had a son, Ralph Jerome. In 1931, Thunder married his third wife, Rachel MacDonald, with whom he had four more children, John Baptiste, Joseph Marcell, Genevieve and Imogene Mable.
