= Karl George (American football) =

American football player (1894–1979)

Profile
- Position: Guard

Personal information
- Born: November 14, 1894; Menomonie, Wisconsin, U.S.
- Died: December 28, 1979 (aged 85); Tarpon Springs, Florida, U.S.
- Listed height: 5 ft 11 in (1.80 m)
- Listed weight: 175 lb (79 kg)

Career information
- High school: Ashland (Ashland, Wisconsin)
- College: Carroll (WI), Loras

Career history
- Racine Legion (1922)

Career NFL statistics
- Games played: 3
- Stats at Pro Football Reference

Karl Willimann George (November 14, 1894 – December 28, 1979) was a guard in the National Football League (NFL). He played for the Racine Legion during the 1922 NFL season.

George played college football at Carroll College—now known as Carroll University—in Waukesha, Wisconsin. He later worked as a foundry clerk and served in the United States Army during World War I and World War II. He moved to Tarpon Springs, Florida in 1965 and died there, on December 28, 1979.
