= Whitey Woodin =

American football player (1894–1974)

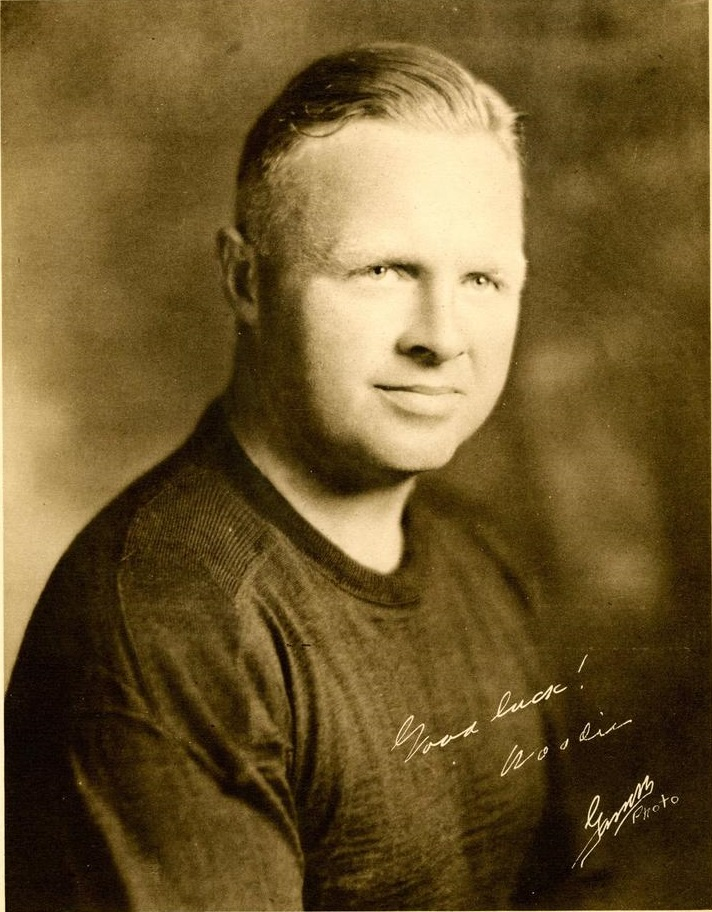

Profile
- Position: Guard

Personal information
- Born: January 29, 1894; Fort Atkinson, Wisconsin, U.S.
- Died: February 7, 1974 (aged 80); Green Bay, Wisconsin, U.S.
- Listed height: 5 ft 10 in (1.78 m)
- Listed weight: 208 lb (94 kg)

Career information
- High school: St. John Academy (Green Bay, WI)
- College: Marquette

Career history
- Racine Legion (1922); Green Bay Packers (1922–1931)

Awards and highlights
- 3× NFL champion (1929, 1930, 1931); Green Bay Packers Hall of Fame
- Stats at Pro Football Reference

Howard Lee "Whitey" Woodin (January 29, 1894 – February 7, 1974) was an American football player. He played with the Racine Legion and the Green Bay Packers and was inducted into the Green Bay Packers Hall of Fame in 1973. After retiring from football, Woodin remained in Green Bay and worked for many years at Falls Power and Paper Company.
