= Fred Broker =

American football player (1893–1971)

Profile
- Position: Tackle

Personal information
- Born: January 17, 1893; Ponsford, Minnesota, U.S.
- Died: December 13, 1971 (aged 78); Park Rapids, Minnesota, U.S.
- Listed height: 5 ft 9 in (1.75 m)
- Listed weight: 175 lb (79 kg)

Career information
- College: Carlisle Indian

Career history
- Oorang Indians (1922)
- Stats at Pro Football Reference

Frederick Charles Broker (January 17, 1893 - December 13, 1971) was a professional football player who played in the National Football League (NFL) during the 1922 season. That season, he joined the NFL's Oorang Indians. The Indians were a team based in LaRue, Ohio, composed only of Native Americans, and coached by Jim Thorpe.
