= Jerry Johnson (American football, born 1894) =

American football player (1894–1947)

- Johnson with the Independents in 1922

No. 9, 2
- Position: Halfback

Personal information
- Born: March 22, 1894; Linn Grove, Iowa, U.S.
- Died: October 24, 1947 (aged 53); Keokuk, Iowa, U.S.
- Listed height: 5 ft 11 in (1.80 m)
- Listed weight: 195 lb (88 kg)

Career information
- College: Morningside (1917–1918)

Career history
- Rock Island Independents (1921–1922); Racine Legion (1922)
- Stats at Pro Football Reference

Leon Julius "Jerry" Johnson (March 22, 1894 – October 24, 1947) was an American professional football halfback who played two seasons in the National Football League (NFL) with the Rock Island Independents and Racine Legion. He played college football at Morningside College.

== Early life and college ==
Leon Julius Johnson was born on March 22, 1894 in Linn Grove, Iowa. He attended Linn Grove High School in Linn Grove. He played college football for the Morningside Maroon Chiefs of Morningside College from 1917 to 1918.

== Professional career ==
On November 1, 1921, Johnson signed with the Rock Island Independents of the American Professional Football Association during the league's second season. He then played in the final two games, starting one, for the Independents that season. He became a free agent after the season. He re-signed with the team on September 13, 1922. Johnson appeared in five games, starting four, for the Independents of the newly-renamed National Football League during the 1922 season, scoring one rushing touchdown, six extra points, and one field goal on five attempts.

Johnson was released by the Independents later in the 1922 season and signed with the Racine Legion of the NFL. He played in three games, starting two, for them in 1922.

== Personal life ==
Johnson served in the United States Navy. He died on October 24, 1947, in Keokuk, Iowa.
