= Hubert Wiggs =

American football player and coach (1893–1977)

Profile
- Position: Offensive lineman

Personal information
- Born: September 29, 1893; Tullahoma, Tennessee, U.S.
- Died: October 18, 1977 (aged 84)

Career information
- College: Vanderbilt

Career history

Playing
- 1921–1923: Louisville Brecks

Coaching
- 1922: Louisville Brecks

Awards and highlights
- NFL head coaching record: 1-3 (1922)
- Coaching profile at Pro Football Reference

Hubert Thomas Wiggs (September 29, 1893 – October 18, 1977) was an American professional football player and coach who played offensive lineman for three seasons for the Louisville Brecks. He played college football for the Vanderbilt Commodores where he was a fullback on the "point-a-minute" 1915 team.
