= Neil Park =

Australian rules footballer

Personal information
- Full name: Neil Park
- Born: 23 July 1962 (age 64)
- Original team: Cheltenham
- Height: 183 cm (6 ft 0 in)
- Weight: 78 kg (172 lb)

Playing career^{1}
Years	Club	Games (Goals)
1982	St Kilda	3 (5)
- ^{1} Playing statistics correct to the end of 1982.

Neil Park (born 23 July 1962) is a former Australian rules footballer who played with St Kilda in the Victorian Football League (VFL).
