= John Fay (American football) =

American football player (1895–1983)

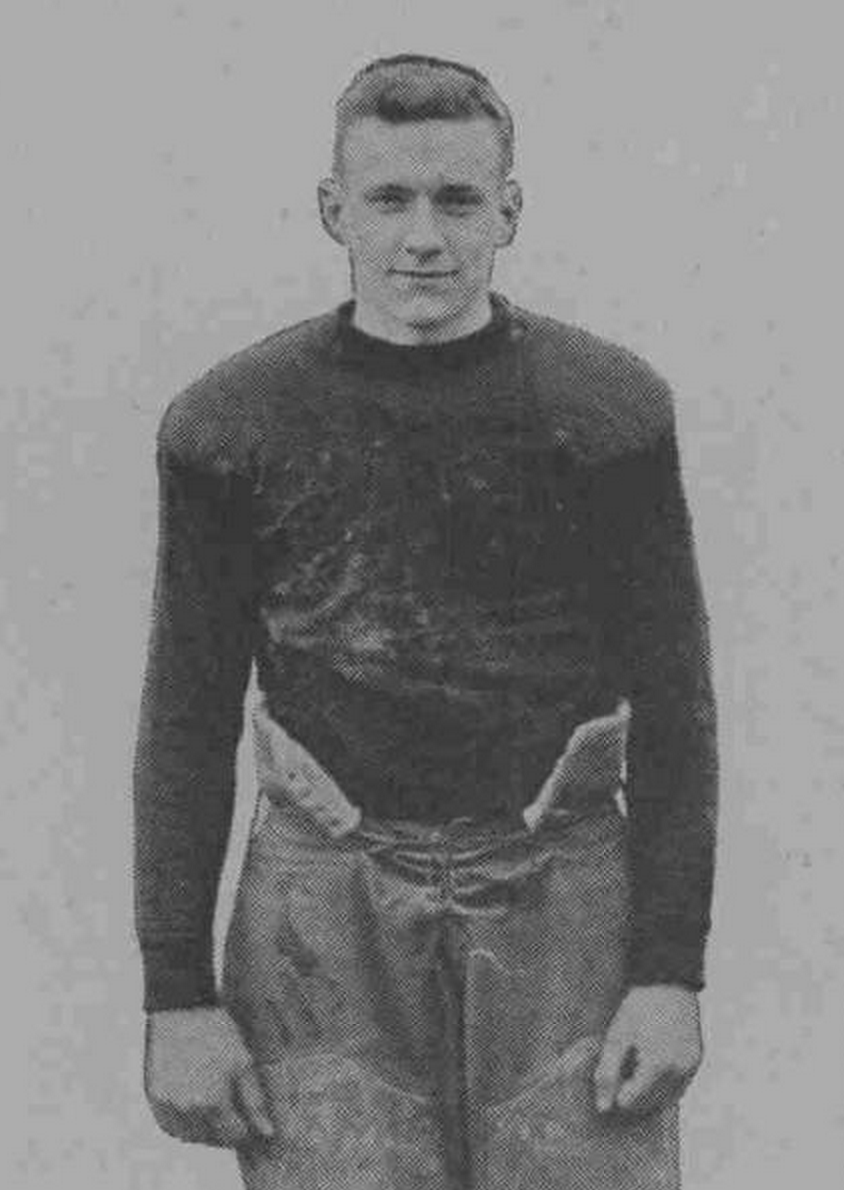
- Fay pictured in Hilltop 1917, Marquette yearbook

Profile
- Position: End

Personal information
- Born: November 27, 1895; La Crosse, Wisconsin, U.S.
- Died: March 14, 1983 (aged 87); La Crosse, Wisconsin, U.S.
- Listed weight: 175 lb (79 kg)

Career information
- High school: Central
- College: Marquette

Career history
- Green Bay Packers (1922)
- Stats at Pro Football Reference

John Carl "Doc" Fay Sr. (November 27, 1895 – March 14, 1983) was an American football end for the Green Bay Packers of the National Football League (NFL).

== Biography ==
Fay was born in La Crosse in 1895, and attended St. Mary's Catholic Grade School along with Central High School. He graduated from Marquette University in Milwaukee in 1918, where he played football and basketball. He organized and captained the basketball teams of 1916 and 1917. Graduating in 1918 with a dentistry degree, Fay briefly practiced with a dental company in Georgia as an enlisted serviceman in World War I, then moved to Omaha, Nebraska, and finally to Menasha, Wisconsin, working as a dentist. With the help of reporter George Whitney Calhoun, he was offered to and signed a contract with the Packers for 1922, earning $100 per game. He retired from professional football after that season. He quit the dentistry profession, stating that he "didn't care for it" after two years of practice in Menosha, and worked for a wholesale furniture company until it folded during the Great Depression. Fay was later a petroleum inspector for the State of Wisconsin. He retired in 1960 after a 27-year career. He was married to Mildred Waters and had two children.
