= Frank Spellacy =

American football player (1901–1960)

Profile
- Position: End

Personal information
- Born: April 6, 1901; Corning, New York, U.S.
- Died: November 15, 1960 (aged 59); Hornell, New York, U.S.

Career information
- High school: Rochester (NY) West

Career history
- Buffalo All-Americans (1922)
- Stats at Pro Football Reference

William Francis Spellacy (April 6, 1901 – November 15, 1960) was an American football end who played one season with the Buffalo All-Americans of the National Football League (NFL). He attended West Side High School in Rochester, New York.
