= League Park (Akron) =

Two former stadiums in Ohio, U.S.

- Interactive map of League Park
- Location: Akron, Ohio
- Coordinates: 41°4′30″N 81°29′58″W
- Owner: Akron, Ohio
- Operator: Akron Pros
- Capacity: 5,000 (American football and baseball)
- Surface: Grass

Construction
- Opened: May 4, 1906

Tenants
- Akron Indians (OL) (1916–1919); Akron Pros/Indians (NFL) (1920–1926); Akron Black Tyrites (NNL II) (1933); Akron Yankees (MAL) (1935–1941)

League Park refers to two former American football and baseball stadiums located in Akron, Ohio. The original League Park was located at the corner of Carroll St. and Beaver St.; the newer stadium was on Lakeshore Blvd. between W. Long St. and W. Crosier St.

== Tenants ==
The stadiums were home to the Akron Pros of the National Football League from 1920 to 1922. In 1933, the Akron Black Tyrites, a Negro league baseball team, played their home games here. It also hosted the Akron Yankees of the Middle Atlantic League, as well as various other minor league baseball teams in Akron.

== Capacity ==
The later stadium had a capacity of 5,000 spectators.

== Characteristics ==
The second League Park was built on land that had a sharp drop-off directly behind the left field fence. This led to the left field wall slanting backwards at such an angle that outfielders could easily run up the wall, using it as a ramp, and catch fly balls that would have otherwise left the park. Since balls hit to left could literally roll up and over the fence, a rule was necessary declaring such hits a ground-rule double.
