= Swayne Field =

Baseball park in Toledo, Ohio

- Interactive map of Swayne Field
- Location: Monroe St. & Detroit Ave. Toledo, Ohio
- Coordinates: 41.6656°N 83.5708°W
- Capacity: 11,800 (initial); 14,800 (1928 expansion)
- Surface: Natural Grass

Construction
- Opened: 1909
- Demolished: 1955

Tenants
- Toledo Mud Hens (AA) (1909-1955); Toledo Maroons (OL) (1908–1921); Toledo Soumichers/Little Mud Hens (SML) (1914); Toledo Maroons (NFL) (1923); Toledo Tigers (NNL) (1923); Toledo Crawfords (NAL) (1939); Toledo Rockets (NCAA) (1934—1935, 1942)

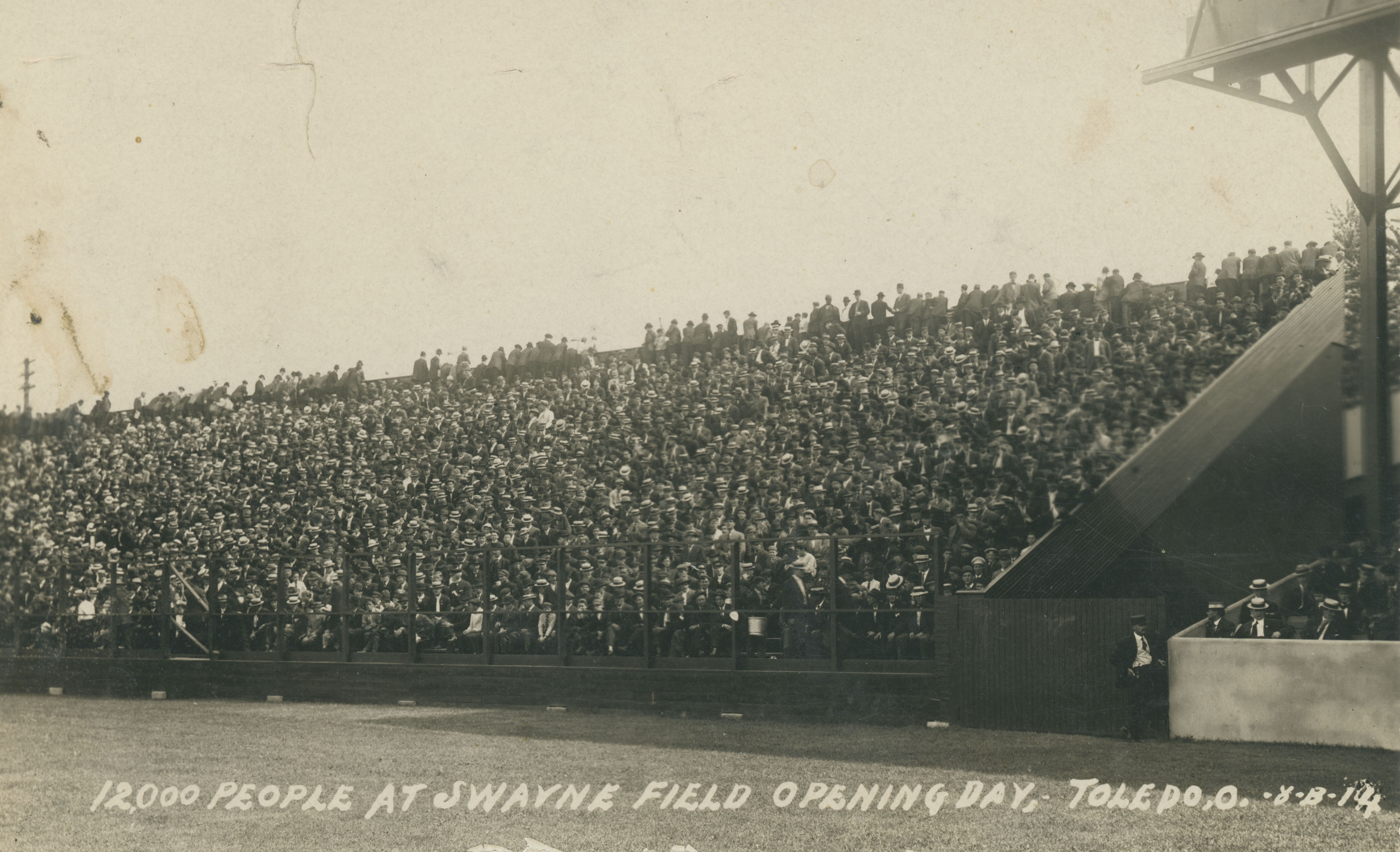
12,000 people in the stands at Swayne Field Opening Day, Toledo, Ohio

Swayne Field was a minor league baseball park in Toledo, Ohio. It was the home of the Toledo Mud Hens from July 3, 1909, until the club disbanded after the 1955 season. It was also home to a short-lived entry in the South-Michigan League in 1914.

The park was named for Noah H. Swayne, Jr., the son of U.S. Supreme Court Justice Noah Haynes Swayne, who donated the land for the ballpark. The double-decker ballpark replaced Armory Park. The main stand was built of steel and concrete, one of the first minor league ballparks not made primarily of wood.

The ballpark was located on a block bounded by Monroe Street (southwest, first base), Detroit Avenue (southeast, right field), Council Street (northeast, left field) and railroad tracks (northwest, third base). Ground was broken on March 6, 1909, and the park opened on July 3. The opening game crowd got its money's worth, as the game went 18 innings, Columbus edging out Toledo 12-11. (Toledo Baseball Guide, p. 97)

Field dimensions initially were 360 feet (110 m) down the left field line, 482 feet (147 m) to center field, and 327 to right field. The park initially held 11,800 spectators. 1928 expansion added 3,000 more seats. Inner bleachers cut the center field distance to 425. In 1945, an inner fence cut down the size of the left and center field areas further, to become more "home run friendly".

With the Mud Hens calling this field their home for the better part of 46 1/2 years, this was the longest-lived of the many ballparks used for professional ball in Toledo. There were a few interruptions. The Mud Hens were transferred to Cleveland for 1914 and 1915 by their owner, who was also the owner of the Cleveland Indians. This was done to keep the Federal League at bay, by ensuring that there was a home game every day at Cleveland's League Park.

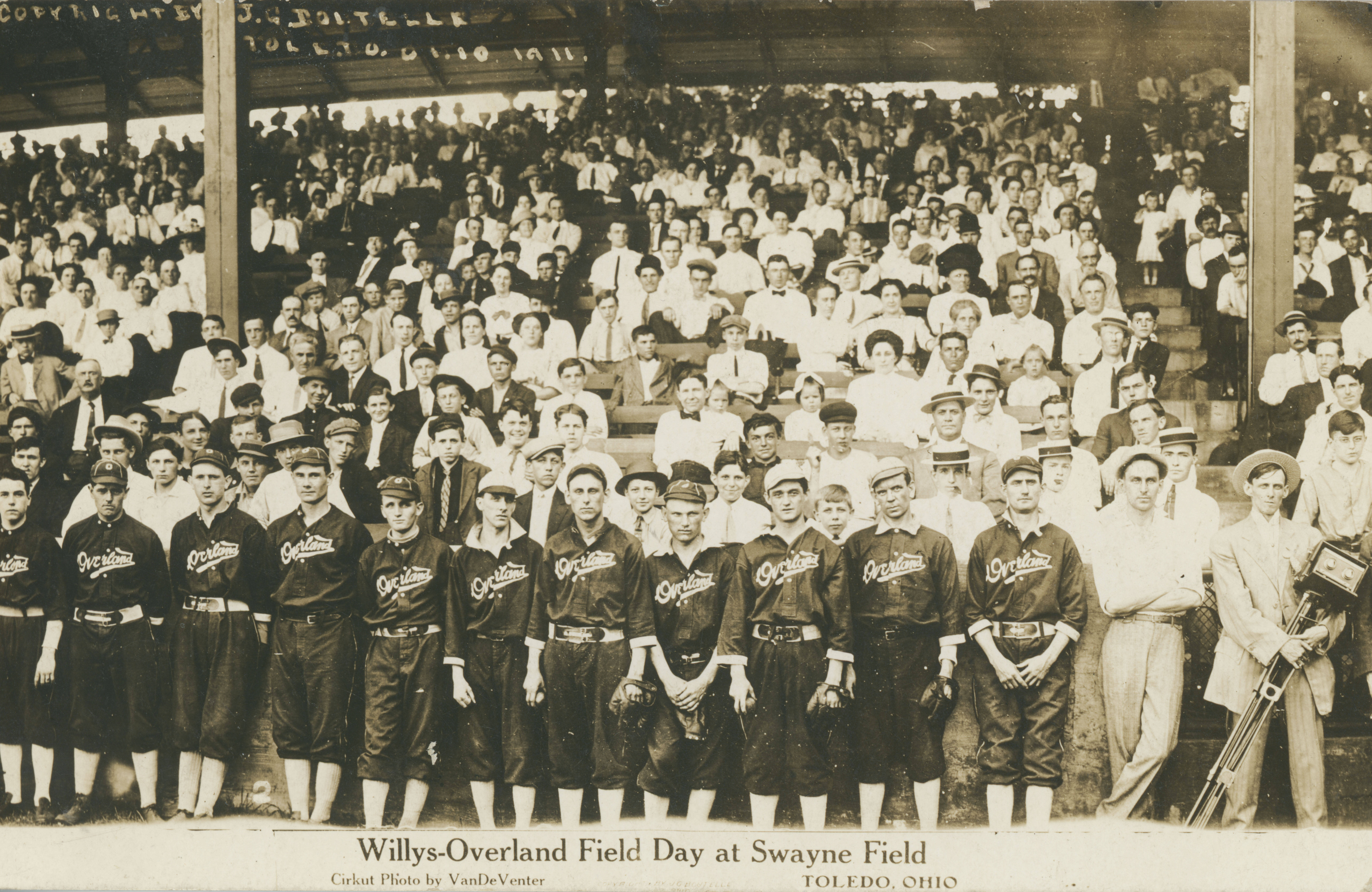
Willys-Overland Field Day at Swayne Field, Toledo, Ohio

Another team was placed in Toledo for 1914, as part of the South-Michigan League. The "Soumichers" or "Little Mud Hens" drew poorly and became strictly a road team for the second half of the season. There was no club in 1915. In 1916, the original Mud Hens transferred back from Cleveland, with the Fed having folded.

The Mud Hens had little success over the years, and in mid-1952 the team transferred to Charleston, West Virginia. Another AA club transferred to Toledo for 1953, but after three seasons it left, and Swayne Field was demolished soon after. The Swayne Field Shopping Center now sits on the site. Much of the original left field wall still exists, forming a decaying barrier on the northeast edge of the block, facing Council Street.

The revived Mud Hens would begin in 1965 at Lucas County Stadium in Maumee, Ohio, which had been remodeled specifically to attract baseball to Toledo again.

== See also ==
- List of baseball parks in Toledo, Ohio

== Sources ==
- The Toledo Baseball Guide of the Mud Hens 1883–1943, Ralph Elliott Lin Weber, 1944.
- Baseball Parks of North America, Michael Benson, McFarland, 1989.
- Baseball in Toledo, John R. Husman, Arcadia, 2003.

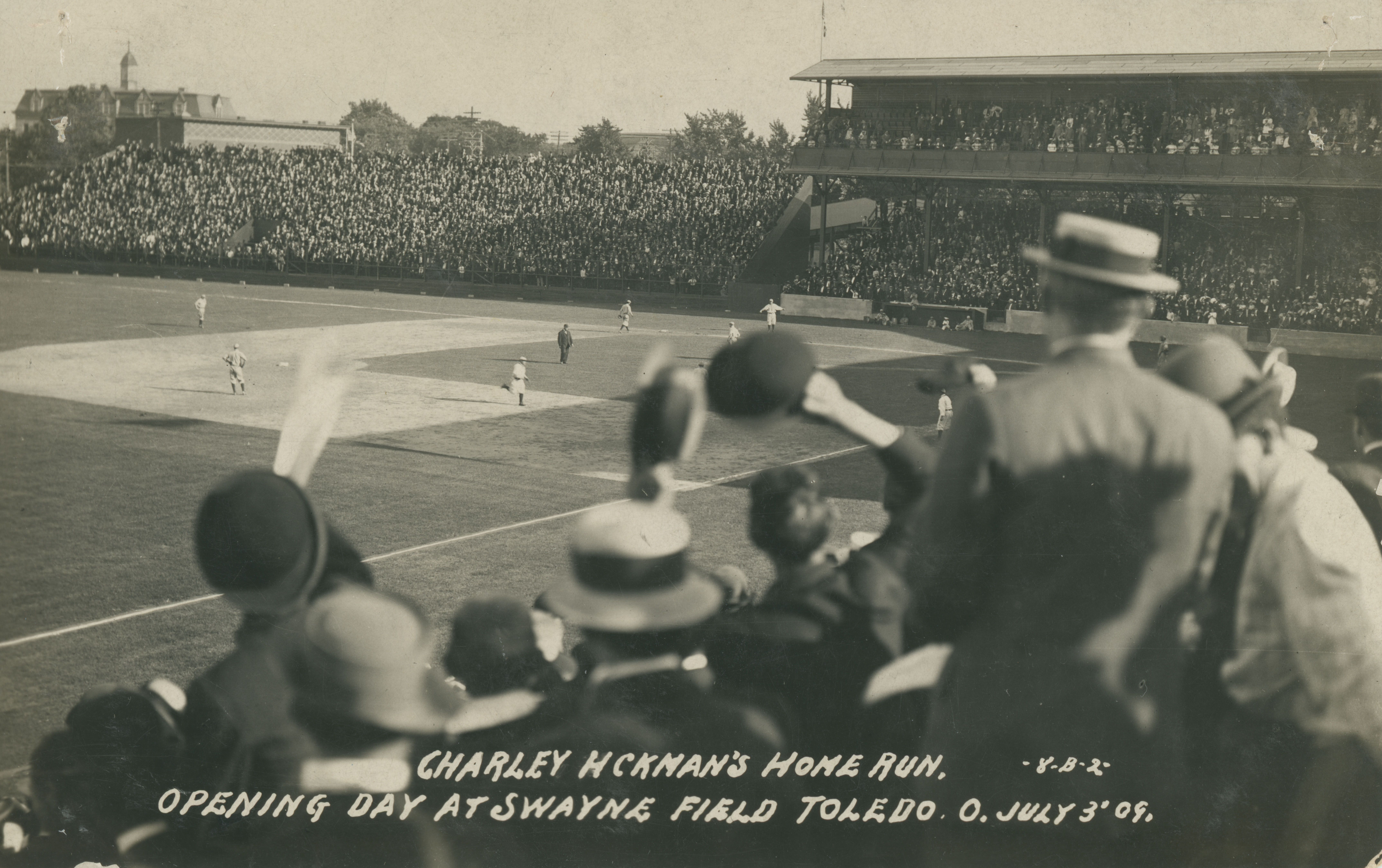
Charley Hickman's Home Run, Opening Day at Swayne Field, Toledo, Ohio, July 3, 1909
