= 1922 NFL season =

American football season

Regular season
- Duration: October 1 – December 10, 1922
- Champions: Canton Bulldogs

NFL teams

The 1922 NFL season was the third regular season of what was now called the National Football League (NFL); the league changed its name from American Professional Football Association (APFA) on June 24, 1922. Unlike the previous two years, when the league had existed as the American Professional Football Association, all teams beginning play in October under the league's banner would survive the season economically without having to terminate play for financial reasons.

A total of 75 games were played by the 18 teams of the league, with a claimed total attendance in excess of 400,000. The league championship was won by the Canton Bulldogs, the first of two back-to back titles.

== Background ==
=== 1921 Packer–Notre Dame scandal ===
The year 1922 started sourly for president Joe F. Carr and the American Professional Football Association (APFA). Just ahead of the league's winter meeting, scheduled to open January 28 in Canton, Ohio, sensational headlines revealed that several prominent college football players had also played for money on professional teams during the 1921 season. While the nexus of the scandal involved the hiring of Notre Dame players by the pro team of Taylorville, Illinois, with their rivals from Carlinville loading up on University of Illinois ringers as part of a local gambling frenzy, the Green Bay Packers of the APFA had also been implicated.

Former Notre Dame star Curly Lambeau, player-coach of the Packers, had obtained the services of three Notre Dame stars — Hunk Anderson, Hec Garvey, and Ojay Larson — it was charged. College coaches, feeling threatened by the rising professional game, loudly denounced this state of affairs, with head coach Fielding Yost of the University of Michigan proclaiming that the menace of professionalism was robbing the collegiate game of "many of the greatest character building qualities, and destroys the ideals of generous service, loyalty, sacrifice, and wholehearted devotion to a cause, which mark the college player." Other coaches followed with public statements in a like vein.

On the evening of January 27, 1922, the University of Illinois disqualified nine of its players from future athletic competition — including future Chicago Bears Joey Sternaman and Laurie Walquist — while Knute Rockne and Notre Dame issued walking papers to eight of their own. Despite APFA president Carr attempts to deflect blame by noting that use of collegiate players was already expressly prohibited by the APFA, the national controversy burned hot with professional football cast in the villain's role.

The flagrant violation of league rules by the Packers would have to be dealt with severely, it was universally believed.

Owner John Clair of the Packers, present in Canton as official representative of the team, chose to fall on the sword for the good of the league. Clair accepted blame for the player scandal and apologized to the other owners for the transgression, asking that Green Bay's withdrawal from the league be accepted. A motion to this effect was made and unanimously carried, allowing President Carr to trumpet a "unanimous vote of directors" that "dropped" the Packers to the press. The Green Bay Packers were out of the league.

As a mechanism to eliminate the possibility of using collegiate ringers, beginning in 1922 the NFL began collecting a $1,000 bond from each team, which would be forfeited in the event college players were employed.

=== League name change ===
The Courtland Hotel in Canton, Ohio — site of the APFA's 1922 winter meeting.

Aside of the emergency business related to allegations of poaching of college athletes, the 18 team representatives assembled in Canton in January 1922 took aim at restructuring and renaming their organization. Instead of the initial model of an NCAA-style supervisory association, a definitive first step was taken towards more compact and closely controlled membership. The $100 franchise fee — never collected from charter members in 1920 — was boosted to $500 at this time.

The organization also broke from the NCAA model in name, rechristening itself the "National Football League" — a title pulled from the National League of Professional Baseball Clubs, the oldest and most venerable sports league in America.

New clubs were accepted to league membership, including a traveling team based in tiny La Rue, Ohio built around former Cleveland Tiger and contemporary sports legend Jim Thorpe and a well-organized team sponsored by an American Legion post and funded by a malted milk millionaire from Racine, Wisconsin. Other new teams for 1922 would include the Milwaukee Badgers and the Toledo Maroons. Another new entry from Ohio, the Youngstown Patricians, was also accepted into league membership, but folded before playing a single league game.

A host of financially-troubled teams did not answer the bell for 1922. These included a number of big city clubs, including the Cleveland Indians, Cincinnati Celts, Detroit Tigers, and first iteration of the New York Giants, and Washington Senators, as well as the smaller Muncie Flyers, and Tonawanda Kardex.

The league attempted to impose a salary cap, which was $1,200 per game.

=== The Pack is back ===
The Hollenden Hotel, Cleveland — site of the NFL's June 1922 meetings.

The NFL's summer scheduling meeting was slated for the weekend of June 24–25 at the Hollenden Hotel in Cleveland. The January public drama over pro teams raiding collegiate ranks for star players had long since dissipated — and NFL officials sought to quietly slide the fanatical fandom of Green Bay, Wisconsin, back into league ranks. On June 9, Green Bay Packer player-coach received a blank franchise application form and cover lever from NFL secretary Carl Storck formally notifying him of the time and place of the forthcoming owners meeting — an unmistakable hint that all was forgiven, so long as a new $500 franchise fee and the $1,000 performance bond required of all teams was paid.

Lambeau arranged financing and took a train to Cleveland, applying for a "new" team for the 1922 season under the name of the Green Bay Football Club with himself as the "new" registered owner. The team was to play 1922 as the Green Bay "Blues," but there was little successful misdirection accomplished by the subterfuge, with the club generally was referred to as the "Packers" in the national press. The club officially returned to its original name in 1923.

== Teams ==
Eighteen teams ultimately competed in the NFL during the 1922 season, down from 21 clubs during the previous season.

First season in NFL	Team folded this season

Team	Owner(s)	Head coach	Stadium
Akron Pros	Akron Exhibition Co. Charles Stahl	Untz Brewer	Akron League Park
Buffalo All-Americans	Frank McNeil	Tommy Hughitt	Buffalo Baseball Park
Canton Bulldogs	Ralph Hay	Guy Chamberlin	Lakeside Park
Chicago Bears	George S. Halas, Dutch Sternaman	George Halas	Cubs Park
Chicago Cardinals	Chris O'Brien	Paddy Driscoll	Comiskey Park
Columbus Panhandles	Joe F. Carr	Herb Dell	Neil Park
Dayton Triangles	Carl Storck	Carl Storck	Triangle Park
Evansville Crimson Giants	Frank Fausch	Frank Fausch	Bosse Field
Green Bay (Blues) Packers	Curly Lambeau	Curly Lambeau	Hagemeister Park
Hammond Pros	"Doc" Alva Young	Wally Hess	Traveling team
Louisville Brecks	Aaron Hertzman	Hubert Wiggs	Eclipse Park
Milwaukee Badgers	Joe Plunkett, Ambrose McGuirk	Budge Garrett (6 games), Jimmy Conzelman (3 games)	Athletic Park
Minneapolis Marines	John Dunn	Russell Tollefson	Nicollet Park
Oorang Indians	Walter Lingo	Jim Thorpe	Traveling team
Racine Legion	Hank Gillo	Babe Ruetz	Horlick Field
Rochester Jeffersons	Leo Lyons	Doc Alexander	Rochester Baseball Park
Rock Island Independents	Walter Flanigan	Jimmy Conzelman	Douglas Park
Toledo Maroons		Guil Falcon	Swayne Field

== Standings ==
NFL standings
	W	L	T	PCT	PF	PA	STK
Canton Bulldogs	10	0	2	1.000	184	15	W6
Chicago Bears	9	3	0	.750	123	44	L1
Chicago Cardinals	8	3	0	.727	96	50	W1
Toledo Maroons	5	2	2	.714	94	59	L2
Rock Island Independents	4	2	1	.667	154	27	L1
Racine Legion	6	4	1	.600	122	56	L1
Dayton Triangles	4	3	1	.571	80	62	W1
Green Bay Packers	4	3	3	.571	70	54	W2
Buffalo All-Americans	5	4	1	.556	87	41	W2
Akron Pros	3	5	2	.375	146	95	L3
Milwaukee Badgers	2	4	3	.333	51	71	L3
Oorang Indians	3	6	0	.333	69	190	W2
Minneapolis Marines	1	3	0	.250	19	40	L1
Louisville Brecks	1	3	0	.250	13	140	W1
Evansville Crimson Giants	0	3	0	.000	6	88	L3
Rochester Jeffersons	0	4	1	.000	13	76	L4
Hammond Pros	0	5	1	.000	0	69	L2
Columbus Panhandles	0	8	0	.000	24	174	L8

Note: Tie games were not officially counted in the standings until 1972.

== 1922 champions named ==
The Canton Bulldogs were named the 1922 NFL Champions after ending the season with a 10–0–2 record.

== Attendance ==
According to league president Joe F. Carr, more than 400,000 people attended the 75 games played by the teams of the National Football League in 1922. Unlike previous years, all 18 teams beginning play under the NFL's banner in October 1922 managed to survive the season without having to terminate operations for financial reasons.
