= Douglas Park (Rock Island) =

Public park in Rock Island, Illinois, U.S.

- Site of First NFL Game, 1920
- Interactive map of Douglas Park
- Location: 18th Avenue and 10th Street in Rock Island, Illinois, 61201
- Coordinates: 41°29′42.3″N 90°35′07.0″W
- Owner: City of Rock Island, Illinois
- Operator: Rock Island Park and Recreation Department
- Capacity: 5,000 (1925)
- Surface: Grass
- Public transit: Quad Cities MetroLINK

Construction
- Built: 1904
- Opened: 1905

Tenants
- National Football League; Rock Island Independents (1907–1925); Minor League Baseball; Rock Island Islanders (1905–1937)

Douglas Park is a public park located at 18th Avenue and 10th Street in Rock Island, Illinois. A former National Football League venue, Douglas Park was the site of the first-ever National Football League game on September 26, 1920. The Rock Island neighborhood that is today called Douglas Park dates back to the 1830s, with the athletic park being constructed in 1904 to 1905 and utilized for football beginning in 1907.

The stadium was home to the Rock Island Independents from 1907 until 1925, one of the original franchises of the National Football League (1920–1925). Douglas Park was also used as a minor league baseball stadium for the Rock Island Islanders teams between 1905 and 1937, replacing Twelfth Street Park (also called Rock Island Baseball Park), which had been the Islanders' home from 1898 to 1904. Numerous Pro Football Hall of Fame inductees, including NFL legends George Halas, Curly Lambeau and Jim Thorpe, performed at Douglas Park.

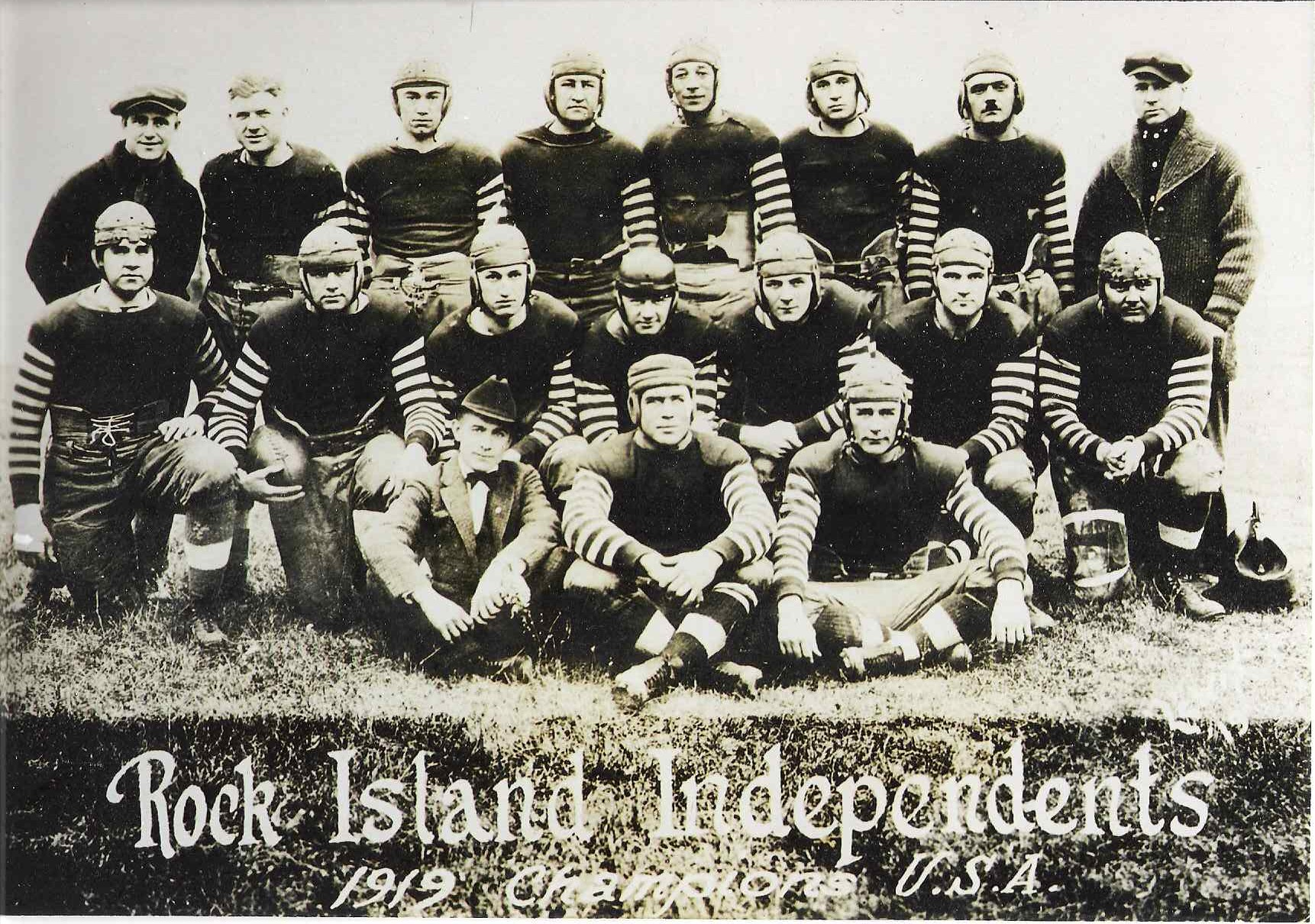
Rock Island Independents team photo, 1919. The Independents were a charter member of the NFL in 1920. The Independents hosted the first-ever NFL game at Douglas Park on September 26, 1920.

== First NFL game ever played September 26, 1920 ==
Douglas Park was the site of the first ever National Football League contest on September 26, 1920. After the league had formed on September 17, 1920, Douglas Park was the scene when the Rock Island Independents defeated the non–member St. Paul Ideals 48–0 in the new league's first contest.

A week later, on October 3, 1920, the Independents defeated the Muncie Flyers 45–0 at Douglas Park in the first full week of league play.

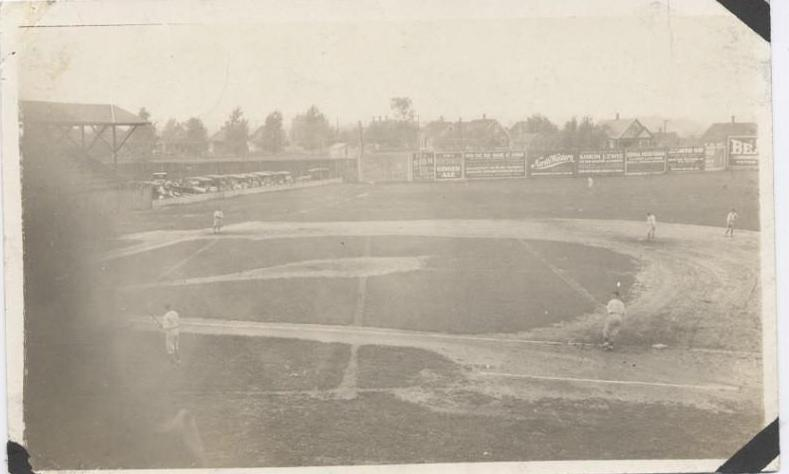
Douglas Park, 1920. Site of the first contest with an NFL team, September 26, 1920. The football lines are visible as the Rock Island Islanders minor league team played.

== Rock Island Independents/National Football League (1907–1925) ==
After beginning play at Douglas Park in 1907 (with undefeated seasons in 1908, 1910, 1912, 1912, 1918), the Rock Island Independents were an original franchise in the National Football League.

Today's National Football League was formed on September 17, 1920, at a meeting in Canton, Ohio with Rock Island Independents representation in attendance. Jim Thorpe was the first League President. First known as the American Professional Football Association, the league would change names to the "National Football league" in 1922. The 14 original 1920 Franchises were the Akron Pros, Canton Bulldogs, Decatur Staleys, Chicago Cardinals, Chicago Tigers, Cleveland Indians, Dayton Triangles, Hammond Pros, Muncie Flyers, Rock Island Independents, Rochester Jeffersons, Buffalo All-Americans, Columbus Panhandles and Detroit Heralds. The Green Bay Packers would join the league a year later.

Rock Island Independents owner (and former player) Walter Flanigan was the driving force in establishing the franchise as an early football professional franchise. Flanigan was present at the September 17, 1920 meeting in Canton and after the formation of the league, Flanigan was named to a committee that created the league's constitution.

The Rock Island Independents posted records of 6–2–2 (1920), 4–2–1 (1921) and 4–2–1 (1922) in the NFL's first three seasons. Five of their six losses were to the Decatur Staleys/Chicago Staleys/Chicago Bears and George Halas. After 2–3–3 (1923), 5–2–2 (1924) and 5–3–3 (1925) records in the next three seasons. The team, now owned by Dale Johnson, fatefully left the NFL after the 1925 season to become a charter member of the short-lived American Football League in 1926. At the same time, Johnson also moved the team's home to Browning Field in neighboring Moline, Illinois. The American Football League and all its teams folded after the 1926 season, ending the Independents existence. The Independents overall NFL record was 26–14–9, with five winning seasons in six years.

Douglas Park played host to several famous NFL teams including the Chicago Bears and their early franchise, the Decatur Staleys, Green Bay Packers, and the Chicago Cardinals. Numerous Pro Football Hall of Fame players played at Douglas Park, including: Jim Thorpe, Curly Lambeau, George Halas, Paddy Driscoll, and George Trafton.

=== Independents in the Pro Football Hall of Fame ===
Four Independents players, who played at Douglas Park, were inducted into the Pro Football Hall of Fame: Jim Thorpe (1963) Tackle Ed Healey (1964), Back Jimmy Conzelman (1964) and Joe Guyon (1966). Thorpe played with the Independents in 1924 and created a touring team called the "Thorpe Independents" after the season.

=== Notable NFL games at Douglas Park ===
- On November 22, 1925, the Independents defeated the Milwaukee Badgers 40–7 in the Final NFL game at Douglass Park.
- On October 4, 1925, the Independents defeated the Green Bay Packers, coached by Curly Lambeau, 3–0.
- On Sept 30, 1923 the Independents defeated the Chicago Bears 3–0. The Bears Coach was George Halas.
- On both September 28, 1924 and September 20, 1925, the Independents and the Chicago Bears played to a scoreless tie.
- On October 1, 1922, in the NFL Home opener at Douglas Park, the Independents defeated the Green Bay Packers 19–14.
- On October 16, 1921, the independents defeated the Chicago Cardinals 14–7.
- On October 7, 1920, the Independents defeated the Chicago Cardinals 7–0.

== Rock Island Islanders (1905–1937) ==
The Rock Island Islanders were a minor league baseball franchise that played at Douglas Park between 1905 and 1937. The ballfield with grandstands was built in 1904–1905.

The Islanders played as members of the Class D level Western League (1934–1937), Mississippi Valley League (1922–1933), Illinois–Indiana–Iowa League (Three-I League) (1920–1921, 1916–1917, 1901–1911), Central Association (1914), Western Association (1894, 1899), Eastern Iowa League (1895) and Illinois–Iowa League (1892).

In 1922, the Islanders were managed by Pro Football Hall of Fame member Jimmy Conzelman, who also played for the 1922 Islanders. Conzelman was a player/coach on the Rock Island Independents football team.

The Islanders were minor league affiliates of the St. Louis Browns in 1932 and Cincinnati Reds in 1933. They won league championships in 1907, 1909 and 1932 and had many alumni play in the Major Leagues.

The Moline Plowboys and Davenport Blue Sox were other Quad City teams that were rivals in the same era.

== Other notable events ==
Though some sources may claim that the first college football game in the rivalry between the University of Iowa and the University of Illinois was a 58–0 Iowa win at Douglas Park on November 30, 1899, this information is incorrect. The correct location for the first Iowa vs. Illinois college football game is Twelfth Street Park.

Douglas Park played host to the ISC World Fastpitch Softball Tournament from 1961 thru 1969, and again in 1973.

In August, 2015, a "throwback" football game was played at Douglas Park to honor the history of football at the site. Early football rules were used in the game, in which the Rock Island Independents team defeated the Moline Universal Tractors 24–0.

== Douglas Park today ==
The park is still in use today by youth Baseball and Rock Island Legion Post 200. The Quad City 76ers Semi–Pro Baseball Club has played home games at Douglas Park since 1986.

"Friends of Douglas Park," formed in 2007 and raised money through donations to remodel the large baseball field. The field was labeled "Phase 1" of a total Douglas Park renovation. On May 9, 2017, the large diamond was re-opened with a high school baseball game between Rock Island Alleman High School and Rock Island high school. A crowd of 450 saw the Rocks defeat the Pioneers 2–0.

== Independents season-by-season ==
Year	W	L	T	Finish	Coach
1907	2	3	1		
1908	4	0	0		
1909	0	3	0		
1910	5	0	0		
1911	Did not play				
1912	8	0	0		Dick Liitt
1913	6	0	1		Dick Liitt
1914	5	2	0		Joseph Smith
1915	5	1	1		Walter Flanigan
1916	5	3	1		Walter Flanigan
1917	7	3	0		Ted Guyer
1918	5	0	0		Walter Flanigan
1919	9	1	1		Rube Ursella, John Roche
Joined the American Professional Football Association
1920	6	2	2	3rd	Rube Ursella
1921	4	2	1	5th	Frank Coughlin, Jimmy Conzelman
AFPA is renamed the National Football League
1922	4	2	1	5th	Jimmy Conzelman
1923	2	3	3	12th	Herb Sies
1924	5	2	2	5th	Johnny Armstrong
1925	5	3	3	8th	Rube Ursella
Moved to American Football League (1926)
1926	2	6	1	7th	Johnny Armstrong
AFPA/NFL-AFL Totals	28	20	13		

== See also ==
Rock Island Islanders players
List of Rock Island Independents players

Preceded by Initial	Rock Island Independents venues 1907–1925	Succeeded by Browning Field
