= 1926 Rock Island Independents season =

American football team season

- Owner: Dale Johnson
- Head coach: Johnny Armstrong
- Home stadium: Browning Field

Results
- Record: 2–7–2 overall 2–6 in AFL
- League place: 7th in AFL

The 1926 Rock Island Independents season was their only season in the first American Football League, after jumping to the upstart league from the National Football League. The team finished 2–6 in league play and 2–7–2 overall, earning them seventh place in the league. The Independents struggled to bring in 5000 fans to its home games and later became a traveling team after having poor attendance in its first three games. The AFL folded after the 1926 and the Independents did not rejoin the NFL. They instead played as a minor, semi-pro team in 1927, then folded.

== Schedule ==
Game	Date	Opponent	Result	Record	Venue	Attendance	Recap	Sources
1	September 26	Los Angeles Wildcats	W 7-3	1–0	Browning Field			
2	October 3	New York Yankees	L 0–26	1–1	Browning Field			
3	October 10	Chicago Bulls	W 7-3	2–1	Browning Field			
4	October 17	at Cleveland Panthers	L 7–23	2–2				
5	October 23	at Philadelphia Quakers	L 7–23	2–3				
6	October 24	at Newark Bears	T 0-0	2–3–1				
—	October 31	at Brooklyn Horsemen	canceled					
7	November 2	at New York Yankees	L 0–35	2–4–1				
8	November 6	at Philadelphia Quakers	L 0–24	2–5–1				
—	November 21	at Cleveland Panthers	canceled					
9	November 21	at Chicago Bulls	L 0–3	2–6–1				
—	November 23	at Newark Bears	canceled					
—	November 25	Clinton, Illinois	canceled					
—	November 28	at Brooklyn Horsemen	canceled					
—	December 4	at Boston Bulldogs	canceled					
—	December 5	Clinton, Illinois	L 3–6	—	Browning Field			
—	December 12	Valley Junction A.C.	T 0-0	—	Browning Field			
Note: Non-league games in italics. Thanksgiving Day: November 25.

== League standings ==
Team	W	L	T	Pct.	PF	PA	Head coach
Philadelphia Quakers	8	2	0	.800	93	52	Bob Folwell
New York Yankees	10	5	0	.667	212	82	Ralph Scott
Cleveland Panthers	3	2	0	.600	62	46	Roy Watts
Los Angeles Wildcats	6	6	2	.500	105	83	Jim Clark
Chicago Bulls	5	6	3	.455	88	69	Joey Sternaman
Boston Bulldogs	2	4	0	.333	20	81	Herb Treat
Rock Island Independents	2	6	1	.250	21	126	Johnny Armstrong
Brooklyn Horsemen	1	3	0	.250	25	68	Eddie McNeeley
Newark Bears	0	3	2	.000	7	26	Harold Hansen
