= 1927 Rock Island Independents season =

American football team season

- Home stadium: Douglas Park

Results
- Record: 3–1–1

The 1927 Rock Island Independents season was their final season in existence. In 1926, the team jumped from the National Football League to the upstart American Football League. When the AFL folded after the 1926 season, the Independents did not rejoin the NFL. They instead played as a minor, semi-pro team in 1927, and then folded. The team posted a 3–1–1 record.

== Schedule ==
Week	Date	Opponent	Result	Record
1	September 18	Moline Indians	W 7–3	1–0
2	September 25	Clinton Legion	W 26–0	2–0
3	October 2	Chicago Mills	T 0–0	2–0–1
4	October 9	Chicago Karpen Indians	W 24–0	3–0–1
5	October 30	at Spring Valley Wildcats	L 7–9	3–1–1
