= 1918 Rock Island Independents season =

American football team season

- Head coach: Walter Flanigan
- Home stadium: Douglas Park

Results
- Record: 5–0

The 1918 Rock Island Independents season resulted in the team posting a 5–0 record and completing shutouts in all 5 games.

== Schedule ==
Game	Date	Opponent	Result
1	September 29	Rock Island Tigers	W 20–0
2	October 13	Peru A.C.	W 64–0
3	November 10	Camp Grant Seconds	W 79–0
4	November 17	St. Paul Aviators School	W 6–0
5	November 24	St. Paul Aviators School	W 13–0
