= George Trafton =

American gridiron football player and coach (1896–1971)

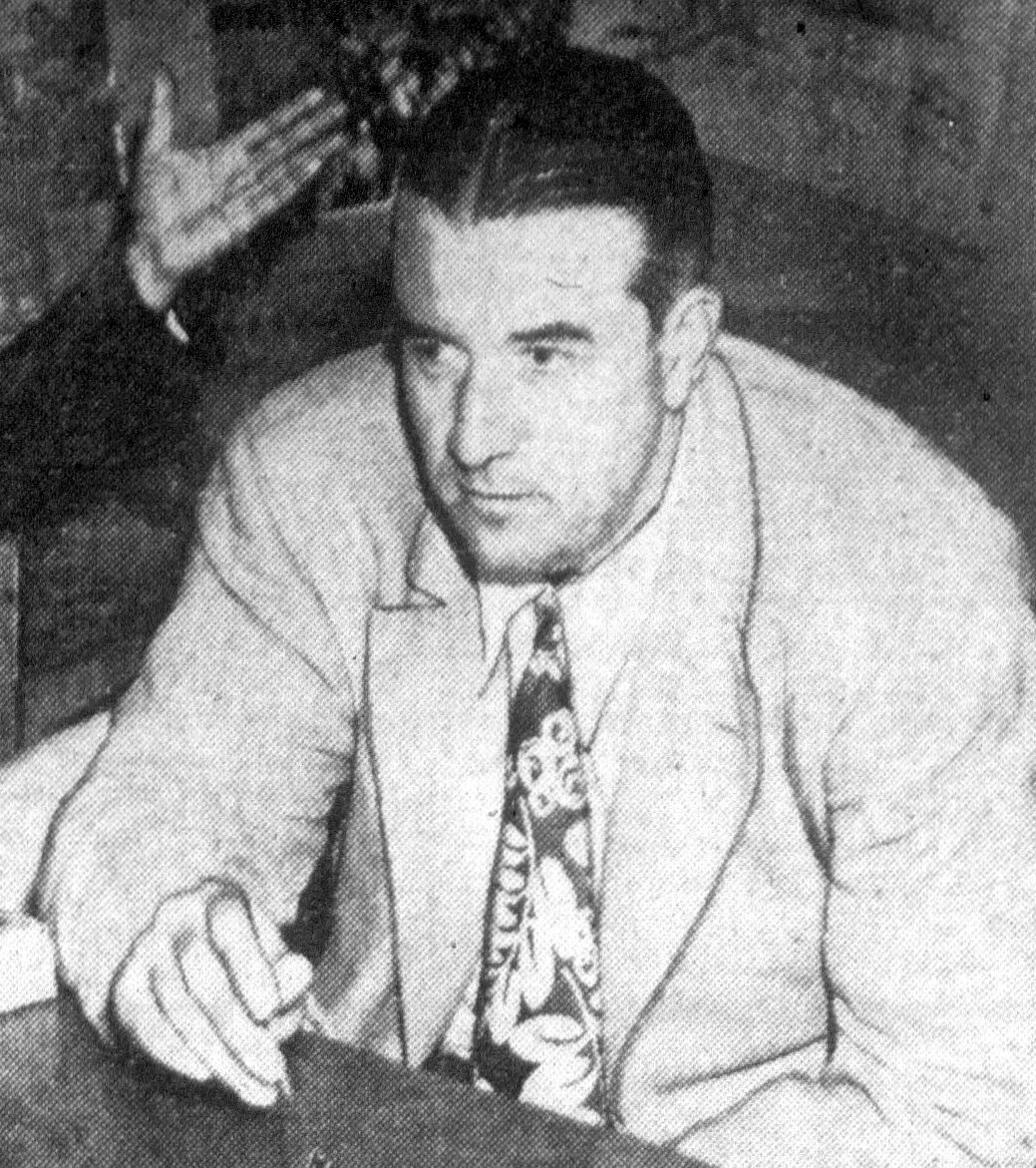
- Trafton in 1943

No. 13, 14
- Positions: Center, linebacker

Personal information
- Born: December 6, 1896; Chicago, Illinois, U.S.
- Died: September 5, 1971 (aged 74); Los Angeles, California, U.S.
- Listed height: 6 ft 2 in (1.88 m)
- Listed weight: 230 lb (104 kg)

Career information
- High school: Oak Park
- College: Notre Dame

Career history

Playing
- Decatur Staleys / Chicago Staleys / Chicago Bears (1920–1921, 1923–1932)

Coaching
- Northwestern (1922) Line; Green Bay Packers (1944) Line; Cleveland / Los Angeles Rams (1945–1949) Line; Winnipeg Blue Bombers (1951–1953) Head coach

Operations
- Los Angeles Rams (1950–1951) Promotions director

Awards and highlights
- 2× NFL champion (1921, 1932); 2× First-team All-Pro (1920, 1924); Second-team All-Pro (1927); NFL 1920s All-Decade Team; 100 greatest Bears of All-Time

Career statistics
- Games played: 149
- Games started: 100
- Stats at Pro Football Reference
- Pro Football Hall of Fame

George Edward Trafton (December 6, 1896 – September 5, 1971) was an American professional football player and coach, boxer, boxing manager, and gymnasium proprietor. He was inducted into the Pro Football Hall of Fame in 1964 and was also selected in 1969 as the center on the NFL 1920s All-Decade Team.

A native of Chicago, Trafton played college football for Knute Rockne's undefeated 1919 Notre Dame Fighting Irish football team. He played professional football in the National Football League (NFL) as a center for the Decatur Staleys (1920) and its successors, the Chicago Staleys (1921) and Chicago Bears (1923–1932). He is credited as being the first center to snap the ball with one hand and was selected six times as a first-team All Pro.

Trafton also competed as a boxer for a time. He also worked as an assistant football coach for Northwestern in 1922, the Green Bay Packers in 1944, and the Cleveland / Los Angeles Rams from 1945 to 1949. He was the head coach of the Winnipeg Blue Bombers from 1951 to 1953. He led the Blue Bombers to the 41st Grey Cup in 1953.

== Early life and college ==
Trafton was born in 1896 in Chicago. He attended Oak Park High School, in the Chicago suburb of Oak Park. He played football for Oak Park from 1913 to 1915.

At age 22, Trafton played college football for one year at the University of Notre Dame. He was a member of Knute Rockne's 1919 Notre Dame Fighting Irish football team that featured George Gipp, compiled a perfect 9–0 record, outscored opponents 229–47, and was recognized as a co-national champion by the National Championship Foundation and Parke H. Davis. Trafton also played for the Notre Dame basketball team during the 1920–1921 season.

== Professional football player ==
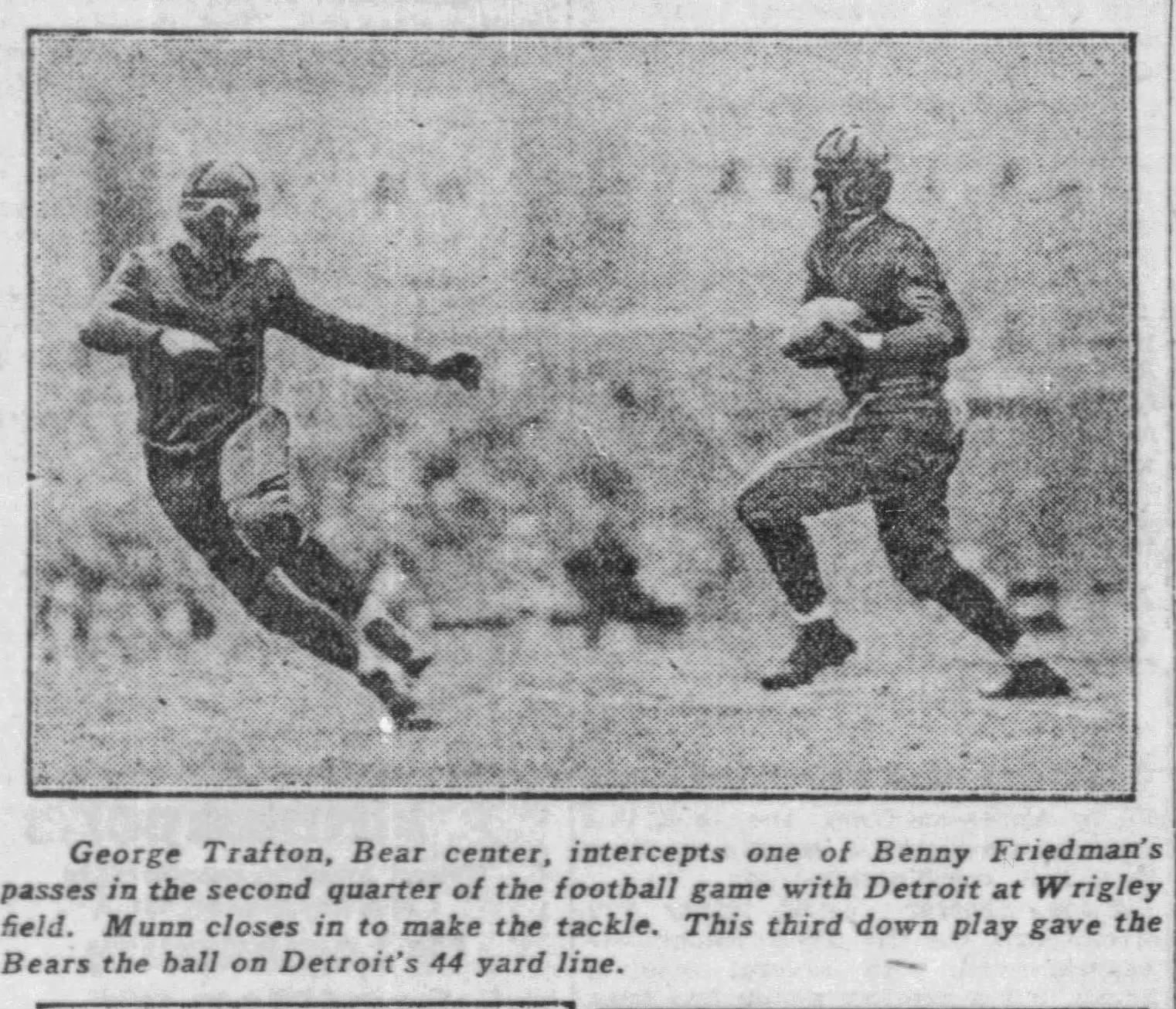
1928 photo of Trafton (right) intercepting a pass

=== Staleys ===
In early July 1920, Trafton signed to play for the Decatur Staleys in the inaugural season of the National Football League (known that year as the American Professional Football Association). Trafton appeared in all 13 games for the 1920 Staleys team that compiled a 10–1–2 record and finished in second place in the new league. At the end of the 1920 season, Trafton was selected as a first-team All Pro. The 1920 Staleys included three players who were later inducted into the Pro Football Hall of Fame: Trafton, George Halas, and Jimmy Conzelman.

In June 1921, Trafton returned to the Staleys, working in A. E. Staley's starch plant during the summer. The 1921 Staleys compiled a 9–1–1 and won the first NFL championship in the history of the Chicago Bears franchise (the Staleys were renamed the Bears in 1922).

=== Northwestern ===
In 1922, Trafton took leave from professional football to serve as an assistant football coach, with responsibility for the linemen, for Northwestern University in Evanston, Illinois. The 1922 Northwestern Purple football team compiled a 3–3–1, and went 1–3–1 against Big Ten Conference opponents. In February 1923, Trafton was forced to resign his coaching job due to a ruling from the Big Ten Conference prohibiting former professional players to coach in any capacity for a conference team. Northwestern's athletic director, Dana Evans, said at the time that he accepted the resignation with reluctance and called Trafton "one of the best line coaches in the conference and a large factor in developing the 1922 Purple eleven."

=== Bears ===
In September 1923, Trafton returned to the NFL as a player with the Chicago Bears. He continued playing with the Bears through the 1932 season. During Trafton's tenure with the Bears, the Staleys/Bears won NFL championships in 1921 and 1932, and Trafton was selected six times as a first-team All Pro (1920, 1923–1927). According to his biography at the Pro Football Hall of Fame, he "was one of the first centers to rove on defense and the very first on offense to center the football with only one hand."

Trafton also became known as one of the roughest players in the earliest years of the NFL. Red Grange called Trafton the "meanest, toughest player alive." Grange claimed it was a tackle by Trafton, twisting Grange's knee while his cleats were stuck in the turf, that ended Grange's career. It was said of Trafton that he was strongly disliked in every NFL city except Green Bay and Rock Island where "he was hated." During a game against Rock Island, he reportedly knocked unconscious four Rock Island players over a span of only 12 plays, knocked a Rock Island halfback into a fence, and was chased from the city after the game under a barrage of thrown objects.

Although players played both offense and defense in his era, Trafton was primarily a defensive presence — essentially a middle linebacker in contemporary terms. His offensive performance as a center tended to be perfunctory. His teammate with the Bears for five seasons, guard Jim McMillen, recalled:

"He was a great center on defense but lazy as blazes on offense. Pictures of our games showed George standing with one hand on his hip after passing the ball back and just gawking around. Herb Stein cured him of that. Stein was playing a roving center about five yards back of the line. He spotted Trafton stargazing, got a flying start, and rammed George squarely in the belly with his head. It knocked Trafton four yards backwards and out cold. That cured him. After that he just laid down after he snapped the ball!"

== Boxing ==
In addition to his football career, Trafton also had a long association with the sport of boxing, as a boxer in 1929 and 1930, and thereafter as a boxing manager and gymnasium operator.

=== Boxer ===
Trafton's first boxing match of note was a December 1929 bout against Chicago White Sox first baseman Art Shires. Trafton won by decision after five rounds. Sports writer Charles Dunkley later called it a legendary bout "which was as vicious and spectacular as it was hilarious." He fought three more bouts in January and February 1930, winning two of those matches by knockout and a third by disqualification.

On March 26, 1930, Trafton faced future world champion Primo Carnera in Kansas City. Trafton was knocked out by Carnera in the first round of their fight. In the aftermath of the fight, Trafton was suspended indefinitely by the Missouri Boxing Commission for failing to provide more resistance in the 54-second bout.

=== Manager and gymnasium owner ===
After retiring from professional football, Trafton operated a boxing gymnasium at 180 West Randolph Street in Chicago in the 1930s and early 1940s. He also served as a manager for boxers. The boxers he managed included light welterweight Willie Joyce who was the 1936 National AAU bantamweight champion, and the 1937 (126 lb) Chicago & Intercity Golden Gloves Champion.

== Professional football coach ==
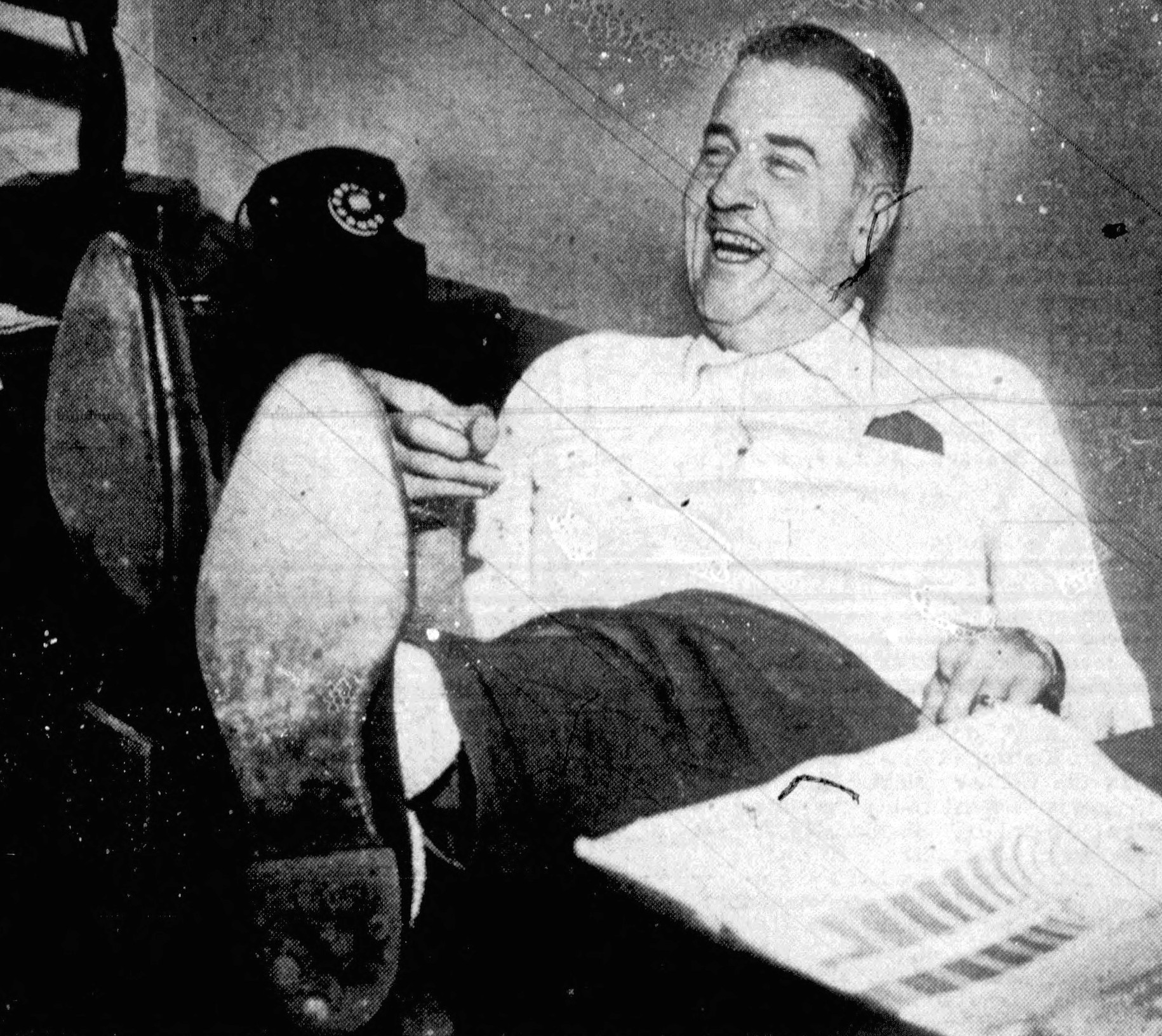
Trafton in 1949

In June 1944, Trafton was hired as an assistant coach with the Green Bay Packers and put in charge of the team's linemen. Working with head coach Curly Lambeau, Trafton helped lead the 1944 Packers to an 8–2 record and the NFL championship. Despite the team's success, Trafton was released by the Packers in January 1945.

In May 1945, Trafton was hired by the Cleveland Rams as the team's line coach. He remained the Rams' line coach when they moved to Los Angeles in 1946 and through the 1949 season. In 1950, he moved to a position in the Rams' front office as promotions director.

In May 1951, Trafton signed a one-year contract as the head coach of the Winnipeg Blue Bombers. Trafton led the 1951 Blue Bombers to an 8–6 record and a third-place finish out of four teams in the Western Interprovincial Football Union. Trafton remained with the Blue Bombers in 1952 and led the club to a 12–3–1, though the team lost to Edmonton in the WIFU Finals. In his third and final season with Winnipeg, he led the 1953 Blue Bombers to an 8–8 record and led the club to the 41st Grey Cup game, which it lost by a 12–6 score against Hamilton. Two weeks after Winnipeg's loss in the Grey Cup game, Trafton was fired in December 1953. He announced his retirement from coaching in January 1954.

== Family, later years, and honors ==
Trafton was married on multiple occasions. He was first married to Suzanne Kellington of Decatur, Illinois, in December 1923. In March 1926, Trafton divorced his first wife on grounds that she deserted him two months after their marriage.

In June 1929, he was married for a second time to Alyce. In April 1931, Trafton sued for divorce on grounds of extreme cruelty; he alleged that she hit him over the head with a ginger ale bottle, threw a chair at him, attempted to kill him with a carving knife, kicked him in the stomach, and frequently clawed him. In her answer, Trafton's wife accused him of being a gigolo at a Chicago hotel and breaking her nose. The divorce was granted in June 1931.

In December 1932, Trafton was married for a third time to Helen Lowenstein. Trafton and his third wife had two children, a daughter (Bliss) born in 1944 and a son (George Jr.) born in 1949. He was divorced again in 1950. He later married to a fourth wife, Jacqueline.

After retiring from coaching, Trafton returned to Los Angeles where he worked in the real estate and property management business.

During his retirement, Trafton received numerous honors for his contributions to the sport of football. These honors include the following:

- In 1950, Trafton was among 25 professional football players inducted in the Helms Athletic Foundation Hall of Fame.
- In 1964, Trafton was elected to the Pro Football Hall of Fame as part of its second class of inductees.
- In 1969, Trafton was selected by the Pro Football Hall of Fame as the center on the NFL 1920s All-Decade Team.

Trafton underwent "major hip surgery" in April 1971 and was then sent to the Villa Gardens Convalescent Home in Los Angeles. He died in September 1971 at West Los Angeles Hospital at age 74. A friend noted at the time, "George just plain wore out." Trafton's funeral service was held in Los Angeles with pall bearers including former teammates and Pro Football Hall of Fame inductees George Halas, Ed Healey, and Link Lyman.
