= NFL 1920s All-Decade Team =

This is a list of all NFL players who had outstanding performances throughout the 1920s and have been compiled onto this fantasy group. The team was selected by voters of the Pro Football Hall of Fame retroactively in 1969 to mark the league's 50th anniversary.

== Pro Football Hall of Fame list ==
All information can be Referenced at the Hall of Fame website
Position	Player	Team(s)	Years	Hall of Fame Class
Quarterback	Jimmy Conzelman	Decatur Staleys	1920	1964
Quarterback	Jimmy Conzelman	Rock Island Independents	1921–1922	1964
Quarterback	Jimmy Conzelman	Milwaukee Badgers	1922–1924	1964
Quarterback	Jimmy Conzelman	Detroit Panthers	1925–1926	1964
Quarterback	Jimmy Conzelman	Providence Steam Roller	1927–1930	1964
Quarterback	Jimmy Conzelman	Chicago Cardinals	1940–1942, 1946–1948	1964
Quarterback	John "Paddy" Driscoll	Hammond Pros	1919	1965
Quarterback	John "Paddy" Driscoll	Decatur Staleys/Chicago Bears	1920, 1926–1929	1965
Quarterback	John "Paddy" Driscoll	Chicago Cardinals	1920–1925	1965
Halfback	Harold “Red” Grange	Chicago Bears	1925, 1929–1934	1963
Halfback	Harold “Red” Grange	New York Yankees (AFL)	1926	1963
Halfback	Harold “Red” Grange	New York Yankees	1927	1963
Halfback	Joe Guyon	Canton Bulldogs	1919–1920	1966
Halfback	Joe Guyon	Cleveland Indians	1921	1966
Halfback	Joe Guyon	Oorang Indians	1922–1923	1966
Halfback	Joe Guyon	Rock Island Independents	1924	1966
Halfback	Joe Guyon	Kansas City Cowboys	1924–1925	1966
Halfback	Joe Guyon	New York Giants	1927	1966
Halfback	Earl “Curly” Lambeau	Green Bay Packers	1919–1949	1963
Halfback	Earl “Curly” Lambeau	Chicago Cardinals	1950–1951	1963
Halfback	Earl “Curly” Lambeau	Washington Redskins	1952–1953	1963
Halfback	Jim Thorpe	Canton Bulldogs	1915–1917, 1919–1920, 1926	1963
Halfback	Jim Thorpe	Cleveland Indians	1921	1963
Halfback	Jim Thorpe	Oorang Indians	1922–1923	1963
Halfback	Jim Thorpe	Rock Island Independents	1924	1963
Halfback	Jim Thorpe	New York Giants	1925	1963
Halfback	Jim Thorpe	Chicago Cardinals	1928	1963
Fullback	Ernie Nevers	Duluth Eskimos	1926–1927	1963
Fullback	Ernie Nevers	Chicago Cardinals	1929–1931	1963
End	Guy Chamberlin	Canton Bulldogs	1919, 1922–1923	1965
End	Guy Chamberlin	Decatur/Chicago Staleys	1920–1921	1965
End	Guy Chamberlin	Cleveland Bulldogs	1924	1965
End	Guy Chamberlin	Frankford Yellow Jackets	1925–1926	1965
End	Guy Chamberlin	Chicago Cardinals	1927–1928	1965
End	Lavern Dilweg	Milwaukee Badgers	1926	Not Inducted
End	Lavern Dilweg	Green Bay Packers	1927–1934	Not Inducted
End	George Halas	Decatur/Chicago Staleys-Chicago Bears	1920–1983	1963
Tackle	Ed Healey	Rock Island Independents	1920–1922	1964
Tackle	Ed Healey	Chicago Bears	1922–1927	1964
Tackle	Wilbur “Pete” Henry	Canton Bulldogs	1920–1923, 1925–1926	1963
Tackle	Wilbur “Pete” Henry	New York Giants	1927	1963
Tackle	Wilbur “Pete” Henry	Pottsville Maroons	1927–1928	1963
Tackle	Cal Hubbard	New York Giants	1927–1928, 1936	1963
Tackle	Cal Hubbard	Green Bay Packers	1929–1933, 1935	1963
Tackle	Cal Hubbard	Pittsburgh Pirates	1934	1963
Tackle	Steve Owen	Kansas City Cowboys	1924–1925	1966
Tackle	Steve Owen	Cleveland Bulldogs	1925	1966
Tackle	Steve Owen	New York Giants	1926–1953	1966
Guard	Heartley "Hunk" Anderson	Chicago Bears	1922, 1923–1925	Not Inducted
Guard	Heartley "Hunk" Anderson	Cleveland Bulldogs	1923	Not Inducted
Guard	Walt Kiesling	Duluth Eskimos	1926–1927	1966
Guard	Walt Kiesling	Pottsville Maroons	1926	1966
Guard	Walt Kiesling	Chicago Cardinals	1929–1933	1966
Guard	Walt Kiesling	Chicago Bears	1934	1966
Guard	Walt Kiesling	Green Bay Packers	1935–1936	1966
Guard	Walt Kiesling	Pittsburgh Pirates	1937–1939	1966
Guard	Mike Michalske	New York Yankees (AFL)	1926	1964
Guard	Mike Michalske	New York Yankees	1927–1928	1964
Guard	Mike Michalske	Green Bay Packers	1929–1935, 1937	1964
Center	George Trafton	Decatur/Chicago Staleys; Chicago Bears	1920–1921; 1922–1932	1964
