= 1917 Rock Island Independents season =

American football team season

- Head coach: Ted Guyer
- Home stadium: Douglas Park

Results
- Record: 7–3

The 1917 Rock Island Independents season resulted in the team posting a 7–3 record.

== Schedule ==
Game	Date	Opponent	Result
1	September 23	Sterling Independents	W 33–0
2	September 30	Alton Tigers	W 33–3
3	October 7	at Davenport A.C.	W 3–0
4	October 14	Peoria Socials	W 49–0
5	October 21	Moline Indians	W 21–0
6	October 28	Racine Regulars	W 12-0
7	November 4	Minneapolis Marines	L 3–7
8	November 11	Davenport A.C.	L 10–12
9	November 18	Minneapolis Marines	L 14–33
10	December 2	Davenport A.C.	W 23–7
