= Walter Flanigan =

American football player (1890–1962)

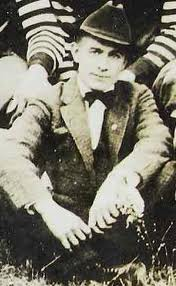

Profile
- Position: End

Personal information
- Born: May 7, 1890; Beardstown, Illinois, U.S.
- Died: June 18, 1962 (aged 72); Rock Island, Illinois, U.S.

Career information
- College: None

Career history

Playing
- 1912–1914: Rock Island Independents

owner
- 1915–1923: Rock Island Independents

Awards and highlights
- National Football League co-founder

Walter Harrison Flanigan (May 7, 1890 – June 18, 1962) was an American football player and owner of the Rock Island Independents. He was also one of the co-founders of the National Football League (NFL).

== Player turned owner ==
Flanigan joined the Independents as a backup end in 1912. For the following two seasons, he served as the team's assistant manager, under then-manager Jack Roche. He then became the manager of the team in 1915. Flanigan soon promoted the Independents by scheduling two games in 1917 against the Minneapolis Marines, who were the self-proclaimed "North West Pro Champs". This contest would help the Independents gain national attention. Rock Island lost to the Marines by close score of 7–3. However, they were defeated by a wider margin, 33–7, at the second game held in Minneapolis. However World War I and the military draft put a temporary halt to Flanigan's plans of expanding the team into new markets.

However once the war ended, Flanigan brought in players from outside the Rock Island area to build on the team. In 1919, he hired Rube Ursella of the Marines to serve as a player-coach. Rube brought several other Minneapolis players with him. These new players would later help get the team an invitation to join the NFL. The Independents lost only to the Hammond Pros, led by George Halas in 1919. However, the Independents still had defeated several "Ohio League" teams that season, such as the Cincinnati Celts (33–0), the Columbus Panhandles (49–0) and the Akron Indians (17–0).

Flanigan then challenged the Canton Bulldogs to a "championship" game, offering a $5,000 guarantee if they would come to Rock Island for the game. However Canton, which had already won the "Ohio League" championship by defeating their arch-rivals, the Massillon Tigers, turned down the offer. It's likely that Canton's Jim Thorpe and Ralph Hay learned that Rock Island's game against the Akron Indians had drawn only 1,700 spectators and felt that Flanigan could not deliver on his $5,000 guarantee, that was money that came primarily from the gate. However, from Rock Island's viewpoint, the Bulldogs were afraid to play the Independents. That was enough for the Independents to claim the U.S. pro title for themselves.

== Life in the NFL ==
=== NFL founding ===
In 1920, Flanigan eagerly joined, and helped found, the new American Professional Football Association (which was renamed the National Football League in 1922). He was present at the September 17, 1920 meeting at Ralph Hay's Hupmobile dealership, located in Canton, Ohio which established the league and made the Independents a charter member of the NFL. and he was named to a committee charged with framing the league's constitution

The Independents posted 4–2–1 records in each of the league's first three years. Five of their six losses were to George Halas and the Decatur Staleys/Chicago Staleys/Chicago Bears.

=== Firing Coughlin in the second quarter ===
On October 16, 1921, after the Independent battled back from a 7–0 deficit against the Chicago Cardinals to lead 14–7 in the second quarter, due to two touchdowns, scored by player-coach Frank Coughlin. Flanigan then ordered the team's tackle, Ed Healey relieve Coughlin. Once Coughlin was safely on his way toward the sideline, Healey delivered a message to Jimmy Conzelman from Flanigan, it read: "Coughlin was fired! The new coach was Conzelman!" This act marked the first and only time an owner hired a new coach in the middle of a game.

=== Ed Healey traded to Halas for $200 ===
In 1922, Flanigan sold the contract of Ed Healey, who was viewed as an erratic tackle who never would mature, to Halas for $200. However, Healey soon became a star for the Bears and would later be inducted into the Pro Football Hall of Fame in 1964. In 1923, Flanigan left the Independents to concentrate on his real estate and insurance businesses.

== Outside football ==
In 1917 Flanigan worked as a desk sergeant with the Rock Island Police Department. The 1930 census showed that he worked as an oil company executive. In the 1940s and 50s he worked as the vice-president of the National Mortgage Company. He died in 1962 at the age of 72. According to the Rock Island Argus one of the mourners at his funeral was Jim Conzelman.

Preceded by Joseph Smith	Owner of the Rock Island Independents; 1915–1923	Succeeded by Dale Johnson
