= Vince McCarthy =

American football player (1899–1968)

Vince McCarty
Profile
- Position: Quarterback

Personal information
- Born: November 3, 1899; Illinois
- Died: November 25, 1968 (aged 69); Fort Lauderdale, Florida
- Listed height: 5 ft 10 in (1.78 m)
- Listed weight: 155 lb (70 kg)

Career information
- College: St. Viator

Career history

Playing
- 1924–1926: Rock Island Independents

general manager
- 1924–1926: Rock Island Independents

Vincent John McCarthy (November 3, 1899 – November 1968) was an American football player who played for three years with the Rock Island Independents of the National Football League (NFL) and the first American Football League.

Once he became owner of the team in 1924, Dale Johnson made McCarthy, who was the team's back-up quarterback, his new general manager.
