= 1916 Rock Island Independents season =

American football team season

- Head coach: Ted Davenport
- Home stadium: Island City Park

Results
- Record: 5-3-1

The 1916 Rock Island Independents season was the team's last season held at Island City Park, before moving into Douglas Park. The season resulted in the team posting a 5-3-1 record.

== Schedule ==
Game	Date	Opponent	Result
1	October 8	at Rockford A.A.C.	L 0–25
2	October 15	at Moline Indians	L 0–3
3	October 22	Aurora Greyhounds	W 21–0
4	October 29	Davenport A.C.	L 0–6
5	November 12	at Davenport A.C.	T 0–0
6	November 19	Moline Indians	W 21–3
7	November 26	Maywood Collegian A.C.	W 14–0
8	December 3	Rockford A.A.C.	W 31–6
9	December 10	Spring Valley Moose	W 13–0
