= 1908 Rock Island Independents season =

American football team season

- Home stadium: Island City Park

Results
- Record: 4–0

The 1908 Rock Island Independents season was their second season in existence. The squad began its season with an organizational meeting held September 25, 1908, with team manager Tom L. Kennedy presiding.

Despite an almost total turnover of their roster from 1907, the team finished with a perfect 4–0 record, defeating both of their rivals from Moline to win the informal Tri-City championship. Rock Island outscored their opponents by a margin of 22 to 2 for the year.

== Background ==
Coming off a 2–1–3 record in a six-game season in 1907, Independents team manager Tom L. Kennedy called an organization meeting for the 1908 campaign for the evening of September 25 at Mason's Cigar Store. A number of players from the 1907 team had announced they would not return for the coming year, Kennedy indicated, and an assessment of personnel needs was required. A captain of the 1908 team was to be chosen.

The Independents wore blue jerseys in 1908 rather than the green-and-white theme for which they later became known.

== Schedule ==
Game	Date	Opponent	Result	Record	Venue	Attendance	Sources
1	October 11	at Muscatine Athletic Club	W 5–0	1–0			
2	October 18	at Moline East Ends	W 8–2	2–0	New Moline Athletic Park	600	
3	October 25	at Moline West Ends	W 4–0	3–0	New Moline Athletic Park		
—	November 1	Kenwanee Regulars	canceled by Rock Island due to rain				
4	November 8	Kenwanee Regulars	W 5–0	4–0	Island City Park		
—	November 15	Moline West Ends	originally scheduled, canceled				
—	November 15	at Peoria Social Athletic Club	scheduled, canceled by Rock Island disbanding				

== Season summary ==
The Rock Island Independents experience an almost complete turnover of their personnel in 1908, with only 2 of 20 players returning from the 1907 squad. With this lack of experience aggravated by relatively late starting date, the team was not regarded as a favorite to beat the better established Moline West End and Moline East End teams in the three-way race for football supremacy in the Davenport–Rock Island–Moline "Tri-Cities" metro area.

After a warm-up game against the Muscatine Athletic Club, won by a touchdown, the Independents paid a visit to the new Moline Athletic Park for a game against the East Ends — weaker of the two Moline squads in 1907. Lighter in average weight than their Moline opponents and outplayed at times, the Independents nevertheless held their own, winning the game in the second half 8–2 on a successful 90-yard forward pass from quarterback Sinnett to left half McManus, with the latter dodging his way past potential tacklers to paydirt.

This set up a decisive battle against 1907 Tri-City champs Moline West End the following week, also held on the new Moline sports field. Once again it was J. McManus who was the bane of Moline, this time connecting with a perfect drop-kick from the 20-yard line in the first half for all the scoring the visitors would need in a 4–0 victory. The West Enders rallied late in the second half, driving the ball to within a foot of the Rock Island goal line when time expired.

The reporter from the Moline Dispatch was distraught, declaring of the home team that "had there been time for one more formation they probably would have left the field victorious by a score of 6 to 4." He also had choice words for the officials, asserting "the utter incompetency of Larson, who essayed to referee the game, was in large measure responsible for the result. He showed a woeful lack of knowledge of rules, and the least that can be said of one ruling is that his eyesight is poor."

A second game against the West Ends, slated for November 15 as part of a previously agreed upon home-and-home set, was quietly canceled, possibly because Rock Island had nothing to gain and everything to lose from such a rematch. A replacement game to be played on the road by the Independents against the Peoria Social Athletic Club for the same date was also cancelled, this due to the November 11 decision of the Independents to disband owing to some players being out of the city, with two others lost due to sickness and injury.

== Roster ==
Although not every Rock Island lineup was published in 1908, the following players participated in at least one Independents game:

Linemen

- Cramer
- Duckmiller
- Eberts
- Engels
- J. Larson †
- Miller
- Mulcahy
- Murphy

Backs

- Anderson
- Atkinson
- Harry Coleman †
- Mack
- J. McManus
- Means
- Sinnett
- Woods

† — indicates returning player from 1907
