= Frank Coughlin =

American football player and coach (1896–1951)

Profile
- Position: Tackle

Personal information
- Born: February 28, 1896; Chicago, Illinois, U.S.
- Died: September 8, 1951 (aged 55); Indianapolis, Indiana, U.S.
- Listed height: 6 ft 3 in (1.91 m)
- Listed weight: 220 lb (100 kg)

Career information
- College: Notre Dame

Career history

Playing
- 1921: Rock Island Independents
- 1921: Detroit Tigers
- 1921: Green Bay Packers

Coaching
- 1921: Rock Island Independents

Awards and highlights
- Second-team All-American (1920)
- Coaching profile at Pro Football Reference

Other information
- Military career
- Allegiance: United States
- Branch: U.S. Navy
- Service years: 1917–1919
- Conflicts: World War I

Francis Edward Coughlin (February 28, 1896 – September 8, 1951) was an American football player and coach.

== Biography ==
=== War and college football ===
During World War I, Coughlin served in the United States Navy aboard a minesweeper. After the war, he played at the collegiate level at the University of Notre Dame. He was named captain of the 1920 football squad after the team's current captain, George Gipp withdrew from the University.

=== NFL career ===
For the 1921 season, Coughlin was named as a player-coach for the Rock Island Independents of the American Professional Football Association (APFA), which was renamed the National Football League in 1922.

Coughlin promised to bring to Rock Island a Notre Dame-style offense based upon tough line play and precise, short forward passes. Assisting Coughlin with the Independents was lefthalf Jimmy Conzelman. The team finished the 1921 season with a record of 4–2–1 in the APFA, good for fifty place out of 21 teams in the association.

On October 16, 1921, down 7-0 to the Chicago Cardinals, Coughlin scored two touchdowns to help give the Independents a 14-7 lead in the second quarter. Team manager Walter Flanigan ordered tackle Ed Healey to relieve Coughlin. Once Coughlin was safely on his way toward the sideline, Healey delivered a message to Jimmy Conzelman from Flanigan, it read: "Coughlin was fired! The new coach was Conzelman!" This act marked the first and only time an owner hired a new coach in the middle of a game. Coughlin then spent the rest of the 1921 season playing for the Detroit Tigers and the Green Bay Packers.

=== After football ===
In 1923, Coughlin became a prosecutor in St. Joseph County, Indiana. From 1945–1949, he served as the assistant Attorney General of Indiana, under Governors Ralph Gates and Henry Schricker.
