= 1915 Rock Island Independents season =

Rock Island Gridiron season under new Management

- Head coach: Lee Liit
- Home stadium: Island City Park

Results
- Record: 5-1-1

The 1915 Rock Island Independents season was the team's first season under manager/owner Walter Flanigan. The season resulted in the team posting a 5-1-1 record.

== Schedule ==
Game	Date	Opponent	Result
1	October 10	Rock Island 900 Block Team	W 65–0
2	October 17	at Moline Indians	T 0–0
3	October 24	Dubuque Braves	W 74–0
4	October 31	Aurora Greyhounds	W 10–0
5	November 7	Des Moines Missions	W 7–0
6	November 14	North Henderson A.C.	W 66–0
7	November 26	Moline Indians	L 0–10
