= 1912 Rock Island Independents season =

American football team season

- Head coach: Lee Liit
- Home stadium: Island City Park

Results
- Record: 8–0

The 1912 Rock Island Independents season was the team's fifth season in existence. The season resulted in the team posting an undefeated 8–0 record.

== Offseason ==
In 1911, the Independents did not play a season. For rule changes, touchdowns became 6 points (instead of 5), the playing field was normalized with it being 100 yards long with 10-yard end zones, the amount of plays to get a first down was changed from 3 to 1, and the limit of a 20-plus-yard forward pass was removed.

== Schedule ==
Game	Date	Opponent	Result
1	October 13	at Moline Illini	W 6–0
2	October 20	Columbus Junction	W 12–0
3	October 27	Davenport Independents	W 6–0
4	November 3	Kewanee Regulars	W 52–0
5	November 10	Moline West Ends	W 53–0
6	November 17	Rock Island Arsenal	W 44–0
7	November 24	Moline Olympics	W 32–0
8	December 1	Spring Valley Miners	W 7–0

== Game summaries ==
=== Game 1: at Moline Illini ===
The Moline Illini, the 1911 Tri-City champions were beaten at Browning field up on the bluff in Moline. After recovering an early fumble, Moline’s center Soderstrom was called for illegal flying tackles which aided the Independents in getting the ball down to the Moline 5 yard line. Roy Salzmann was called from tackle to the backfield on a 3rd and goal from the 5 yard line. Salzmann took his first carry and was met at the 3 yard line by several Illini players. On 4th down from the 3 Salzmann shot towards the line and dove over coming down head first for what would eventually be the game winning score. MacManus at quarter had several nice runs and many long kick returns. On defense, center Caulfield repeatedly broke into the Illini backfield to break up plays.

=== Game 2: vs. Columbus Junction ===
Yesterday the city of Rock Island hosted its first football game since 1908. The visitors were the undefeated Columbus Junction team from Iowa. For the game the Independents were able to secure big guard Roy Smith who weighs in at 230 pounds.

Kickoff was at 3 O’clock, for the first part of the first quarter neither team could move the ball. The Independents made some adjustments and instead of line smashes and end runs they utilized the forward pass. Late in the first quarter MacManus found the end Murphy along the sideline and he raced 30 yards and in for the score. Some good defense and a Rock Island fumble at the 1 yard line prevented the Independents from scoring again in the half.

In the third quarter MacManus took the snap from center and burst through a hole in the line, several Columbus Junction players got their hands on MacManus as he ran through the broken field for 40 yards and the second Independents touchdown. Columbus Junction played a good game on defense but only got a couple first downs, never threatened to score and only got out of their territory once or twice. The Independents showed ability to adapt their attack and had scoring opportunities.

=== Game 3: vs. Davenport Independents ===
Davenport weighed in 10 pounds heavier per man but Rock Island was able to hold to remain undefeated. Harry Coleman, Arthur Salzmann and Tommy Thompson were added to the roster Thursday to beef up the Independents for the contest. Davenport added several ex-high school stars to help strengthen the backfield.

The game started at 3 O’clock. Davenport took the opening kick and immediately moved the ball into Rock Island territory. Herb Sies lined up for a place kick but the kick tailed a bit to the left and the referees ruled the kick no good. Both teams moved up and down the field but Davenport never seriously threatened to score again. Late in the game Rock Island took the ball from their own 35 yard line and marched down to the Davenport 3 yard line. On first and goal Art Salzmann was held to no gain. Again Salzmann smashed into the line only to meet fierce resistance. On third down MacManus kept the ball himself after a mixup in the backfield and almost took the ball over goal.

On 4th and one yard to g, the Independents lined up to go for the win. Salzmann took the ball and once again he was stuffed at the line. Fortunately for Rock Island, before the play started the Davenport official blew the play dead, offsides Rock Island. After the 5 yard penalty it was 4th and 6. The Independents lined up with a balanced line. Right end Behnamann was called to shift over to the left side of the line. It appeared Rock Island was going to run to the left. MacManus took the snap, ran back and gave a pump fake to the left. Quickly he turned and fired to Swanson who was no eligible and had released off the line to the right. Swanson reached out and hauled in the pass for the game winning score. Roy Salzmann missed the goal kick. Rock Island held Davenport again and took possession and held it until the final whistle.

Herb Sies who played for St. Ambrose University was seen playing the game for Davenport at left half. Sies later went on to play for and coach the Rock Island Independents in 1923. Also starting in the game for Davenport was Waddy Kuehl, another St. Ambrose player. Kuehl played several years with the Rock Island Independents.

=== Game 4: vs. Kewanee Regulars ===
Kickoff was at 3 O’clock and the Regulars took the opening kickoff. After failing to make a first down they punted to the Independents. Rock Island had several runs up the middle and quickly scored a touchdown on a run by Robb.

The game was never in doubt as Rock Island ran and threw the ball all over the field. The Independents were able to complete several passes on the day 2 of which went for touchdowns. Eight players scored touchdowns and Coleman was able to kick 4 extra points. The details are unclear as to how and when each player scored but it was clear that the Independents had no problems and were able to play all of their subs. Rock Island moved to 4–0 and will host the Moline West Ends next week since the Peoria Socials backed out of the game. The thought in Rock Island is that they fear they would not have a chance against the Independents.
