= 1909 Rock Island Independents season =

American football team season

- Home stadium: Island City Park

Results
- Record: 0–2

The 1909 Rock Island Independents season was the team's third year in existence.

The season was an abject catastrophe for the team, with the 1908 Tri-City champions blown out of the two games they managed to play by a combined score of 87–0.

== Background ==
After going undefeated in four games and taking the championship of the Davenport–Rock Island–Moline Tri-Cities metropolitan area in 1909, the Rock Island Independents walked into a proverbial buzzsaw in 1909. Things started badly when the Moline West Ends — Rock Island's stiffest competition the previous two years — raided the Independents for some of their best players, including their biggest star of 1908, J.D. McManus.

So, too, did another new club — the Rock Island Maroons — which included left half Salzman, a star of the 1907 Independents team. Adding to the mix was another team entering the fray from the other side of the Mississippi River, with a Davenport West Ends team joining the Moline East End and West End teams as well as the Independents and Maroons of Rock Island in the local football derby — further thinning the local post-high school football talent pool.

The best players of 1908 were not the only thing missing for the Independents in 1909 — gone, too, seems to have been team manager Tom L. Kennedy, the individual who personally recruited the Independents teams of 1907 and 1908 His name was never once mentioned in the Rock Island's newspaper of record in 1909.

In addition to a thinner talent pool, missing stars, and a lack of central organization, the lackadaisical attitude of the Independents towards game preparation had already previously been worthy of public note, with one late-season headline from 1908 noting the team's "Excellent Showing with Little Practice." The 1909 season would generate no such counterintuitive outcome.

== Schedule ==
Game	Date	Opponent	Result	Record	Venue	Attendance	Sources
1	October 10	at Moline West Ends	L 0–46	0–1	New Moline Athletic Park		
2	October 17	at Moline East Ends	L 0–41	0–2	New Moline Athletic Park	"large crowd"	

== Season summary ==
The Independents first took the field on October 10 against the Moline West Ends, a local powerhouse for several years. The game, played in a drizzling rain on a very muddy field, stayed close for three minutes — exactly long enough for the West Ends to score their first touchdown of the day. "In that time the locals were convinced that they were thoroughly outclassed and this kept [them] from trying as hard as they otherwise would," opined one friendly newspaper reporter. It would be just four more minutes before a second touchdown was scored, and the rout was on.

The Independents' "ignominious defeat" by a score of 46 to 0 showed the caliber of the 1909 squad in a harsh light. "The Independents were woefully weak both on defense and offense, and at no stage of the game did they show the same ability which characterized their play last year when they won the championship for this city for the first time in the history of independent football," the reporter from the Rock Island Argus declared. The West Ends were bigger, faster, more skilled, and more motivated — and when the second half began with two more touchdowns in just 10 minutes, the game was called and the slaughter mercifully terminated.

Having surrendered more points in their 1909 season opener than in every game of the previous two years combined, the Independents prepared to do battle with the other Moline squad — the East Ends — the following Sunday. Another "walkaway" would result, in which Rock Island "failed to hold them at any stage of the game."

A large crowd was on hand to see 1908's local champions humiliated for the second straight week, with the East Enders mixing end runs, line bucks, and forward passes with equal effect, gaining ground "in nearly any way they chose." The final score of 41–0 left the Independents shell-shocked, with Rock Island's civic gridiron hopes for 1909 clinging to fate of the newly organized Maroons club.

Dispirited and outclassed, no further games were played by the Independents in 1909.

== Roster ==
Linemen

- Bletcher
- Druckmiller †
- Eberts †
- Engels †
- Frazer
- Gaesar
- Jenner
- Mulcahy †
- Sullivan

Backs

- Atkinson †
- Knapp
- Means †
- Ridnor
- Roche

† - denotes returning player from 1908
