= 1913 Rock Island Independents season =

American football team season

- Head coach: Dick Liit
- Home stadium: Island City Park

Results
- Record: 6-0-1

The 1913 Rock Island Independents season was the team's sixth season in existence. The season resulted in the team posting an undefeated 6-0-1 record and claimed the mythical "Illinois State Championship".

== Schedule ==
Game	Date	Opponent	Result
1	October 5	Davenport West Side Pickups	W 20–0
2	October 12	at Moline Illini	W 13–0
3	October 19	Peoria Socials	W 25–0
4	November 2	Moline Olympics	T 0–0
5	November 16	at Moline Olympics	W 10–7
6	November 23	at Peoria Socials	W 12–6
7	November 30	Columbus Junction	W 13–0
