= Browning Field =

Sports venue in Moline, Illinois, US

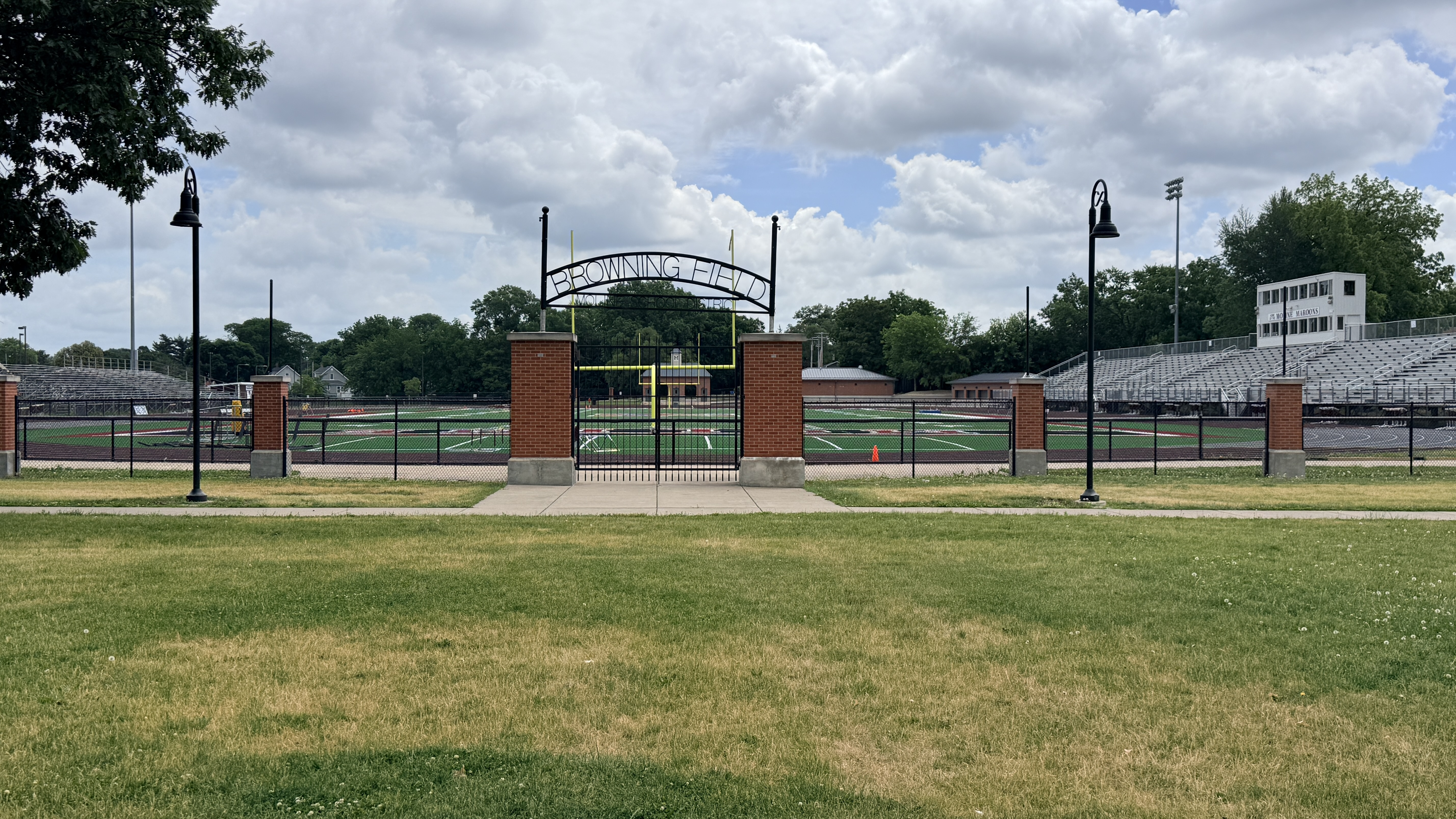
- Browning Field in 2026
- Interactive map of Browning Field
- Address: 16th Street and 23rd Avenue; Moline, Illinois; United States
- Coordinates: 41.492081°N 90.511776°W
- Owner: City of Moline, Illinois
- Operator: City of Moline, Illinois
- Capacity: 5,600 (1948)
- Surface: Grass
- Field size: (LF-CF-RF) 550-440-377 (1948)
- Public transit: Quad Cities MetroLINK

Construction
- Groundbreaking: 1910
- Built: 1910-14
- Opened: 1912
- Renovated: 1972
- Expanded: 1920

Tenants
- American Football League; Rock Island Independents (1926); Minor League Baseball; Moline Plowboys (1920-1948); High School Sports; Moline High School (1912-Present)

Browning Park is a park in Moline, Illinois, United States, located at 16th Street and 23rd Avenue. Browning Field has been the home of high school and professional athletic events since 1910. It has hosted athletes such as Babe Ruth and Red Grange.

== Origin and History ==
John T. Browning (1830–1910) was a lawyer who served as the City of Moline's first City Attorney. He was also a two-term State Assemblyman. In his last year of his life, Browning was planning on erecting a memorial to himself on the farmland that he owned when he was convinced by A. M. Beal, President of the Moline Board of Education, to deed the land to the city for use as an athletic park. On July 14, 1910, he added the codicil to his will, stating that his land were to be "held in trust forever by the City of Moline and dedicated to the public as and for a playground and athletic park, which shall be known and designated as the John T. Browning Park, Playground, and Athletic Field".

The land is deeded to the city of Moline for use as a "playground and athletic park". While the sports teams of Moline High School have been the primary tenants of the field (and the adjoining Wharton Field House), the Rock Island Independents, the only professional American football team to be charter members of two major leagues, called Browning Park its home in the 1920s, as did the minor league baseball Moline Plowboys.

The facility opened on Oct. 5, 1912. Moline High School defeated Maquoketa 34–0 in a football game, the first event at John T. Browning Park.

The next four years saw the creation of an American football/track and field stadium and a baseball field. In the late 1920s, T. F. Wharton, president of the Moline High School boosters' club led the drive toward the sale of bonds, the proceeds of which to pay for the construction of a field house on adjoining land (this was also deeded to the city of Moline upon the retirement of the bonds). Wharton Field House was opened to the public in 1928.

== Moline Plowboys History ==
Moline first gained a minor league franchise in July, 1914 when the Danville Speakers relocated and the Moline Plowboys were established. The "Plowboys" name reflected Moline's agricultural production history. Companies such as John Deere, Moline Plow Company, and Minneapolis-Moline were located in Moline. The Plowboys initially played at Athletic Park, before moving to Browning Field in 1920. The Plowboys won Three-I League Championships at Browning in 1921 and 1937. The franchise was an affiliate of the Detroit Tigers (1932), Chicago Cubs (1937–40) and Philadelphia A's(1947–48). From 1920 to 1922, the Plowboys were managed by player-manager Earle Mack, son of legendary Hall of Fame owner/manager Connie Mack. Baseball Hall of Fame inductee Warren Giles, future President of the National League (1951-1969), was President of the Plowboys Franchise from 1919 to 1922.

Browning Field served as the home of the Plowboys from 1920 to 1948. The 5,600 capacity baseball park had dimensions of (LF-CF-RF) 550-440-377. The first night game at the park was July 11, 1930.

== Professional Football ==
In 1926, the Rock Island Independents played at Browning Field. The Independents had been a charter member franchise of the National Football League, playing in the league from 1920 to 1925 against the likes of the Chicago Bears, Green Bay Packers and Chicago Cardinals. However, the Independents left the NFL and Douglas Park, moving to Browning Field and playing in the new, but short lived American Football League. On October 3, 1926, the Independents hosted the football New York Yankees and their star player Pro Football Hall of Fame legend Red Grange, losing 26–0 with a home crowd of 5,000. The AFL and the Independents folded after the 1926 season.

== Major League Baseball Events ==
In an exhibition game on April 12, 1920, the Plowboys defeated the Chicago White Sox 7–1 at Browning Field.

On April 14, 1938, the Chicago Cubs Played an exhibition at Browning Field against the Plowboys.

Babe Ruth appeared at Browning Field on June 26, 1940. 2,600 fans showed for a Plowboys exhibition game starring Ruth and to watch Ruth put on a batting practice exhibition.

== Notable Plowboys Alumni ==
- Art Ditmar (1948)
- Joe Glenn (1947)
- Hank Wyse (1940) MLB AS; 1945 WS Cubs
- Lennie Merullo (1939) 1945 WS Cubs
- Eddie Waitkus(1939) 2 x MLB AS; Shot by obsessed fan 1949;
- Lou Novikoff (1938)
- Kirby Higbe (1937) 2 x MLB AS; 1941 NL Wins Leader
- Peanuts Lowrey (1937) MLB AS; 1945 WS Cubs
- Elden Auker (1932)
- Claude Passeau (1932) 4 x MLB AS; 1945 Cubs WS; 1938 NL Strikeouts Leader
- Mike Tresh (1932) MLB AS
- Jake Wade (1932)
- Len Koenecke (1932)
- Bob Weiland (1928)12 MLB Seasons
- Fritz Mollwitz (1927)
- Evar Swanson (1924)
- Earle Mack (1922)
- Dutch Ulrich (1922)
- Bill Barrett (1921)
- Fred Heimach (1921)
- Fred Smith (1921)
- Warren Giles Team President 1919–1921; NL President (1951 - 1969); Baseball Hall of Fame (1979)
