= 1910 Rock Island Independents season =

American football team season

- Home stadium: Island City Park

Results
- Record: 5–0

The 1910 Rock Island Independents season was to have marked the fourth year of the team's existence. However, after the collapse of the team in 1909, no games were played in 1910 or 1911.

== Background ==
Organized ahead of the 1907 season, the first two years of the Rock Island Independents were quite successful, with the club posting a combined record of 6–1–3 and capturing the 1908 football championship for the Tri-Cities metropolitan area. Organized and managed by Tom L. Kennedy, the Independents had been particularly capable on the defensive side of the ball, holding their opponents scoreless in 7 of the 10 games played.

The team's Year Three had been a crushing disappointment, however, with the Independents suffering shutout defeats by margins of more than 40 points and an abrupt mid-October end to the 1909 gridiron season after only two games were played. The club's future was in serious doubt, with an early September news story in the Rock Island Argus indicating that the Independents "will not reorganize this year according to present indications. As the 1910 season approached, the banner of professional football in Rock Island was passed from the Independents a squad of new local darlings, the Rock Island Maroons, who went toe-to-toe with their Tri-Cities competitors, finishing 1909 with a record of 4 wins and 1 loss — a 9–0 shutout at the hands of the Moline East Ends, who had beat the Independents by 41 earlier in the year.

The Rock Island Independents would vanish from the scene for the 1910 and 1911 seasons, to reemerge as a powerful force in 1912.
