= Herb Sies =

American football player and coach (1893–1954)

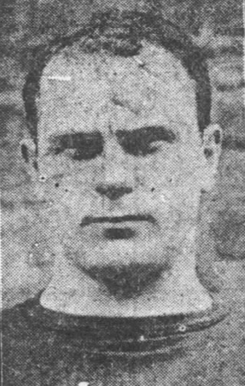

Profile
- Positions: Guard, tackle

Personal information
- Born: January 2, 1893; Ames, Iowa, U.S.
- Died: October 17, 1954 (aged 61); Chicago, Illinois, U.S.
- Listed height: 6 ft 1 in (1.85 m)
- Listed weight: 203 lb (92 kg)

Career information
- High school: Davenport (Davenport, Iowa)
- College: Pittsburgh

Career history

Playing
- 1920: Cleveland Tigers
- 1921–1922: Dayton Triangles
- 1923: Rock Island Independents
- 1924: Dayton Triangles

Coaching
- 1923: Rock Island Independents

Awards and highlights
- Consensus All-American (1917); Collyer's Eye second-team All-NFL (1923)
- Coaching profile at Pro Football Reference

Dale Hubert Sies (January 2, 1893 – October 17, 1954) was an American football player and coach. He was born on January 2, 1893, in Ames, Iowa and attended Davenport High School. He enrolled at the University of Pittsburgh, where he played football as a guard. Sies was named a consensus All-American in 1917. Seis played five seasons in the National Football League (NFL) and its predecessor, the American Professional Football Association. Sies began his professional playing career with the Cleveland Tigers in 1920 for whom he started one game. The following season, he played for the Dayton Triangles as a right guard. That season, he started in nine games, and the following year, he started in eight games. In 1923, he both played for and served as the head coach for the Rock Island Independents. Sies coached his team to an 8–2–3 record to finish 12th in the league. He started in eight games for the Independents and made good three field goals and eight extra point attempts. That season, Collyer's Eye magazine named Sies to its All-NFL second-team. In 1924, he returned to Dayton for his final season. He made one field goal attempt for the Triangles.
