= 1914 Rock Island Independents season =

American football team season

- Head coach: Lee Liit
- Home stadium: Island City Park

Results
- Record: 5-2

The 1914 Rock Island Independents season was the team's last season under manager/owner John Roche. The season resulted in the team posting a 5–2 record.

== Schedule ==
Game	Date	Opponent	Result
1	October 4	Moline Red Men	W 13–0
2	October 18	Davenport Independents	W 39–0
3	October 25	Moline Olympics	W 19–0
4	November 1	Aurora All-Stars	W 38–0
5	November 8	Des Moines Alexandrias	W 51–7
6	November 15	Moline Red Men	L 0–9
7	November 29	Evanston North Ends	L 0–6
