= 1907 Rock Island Independents season =

American football team season

- Head coach: Lou Weidmann
- Home stadium: Island City Park

Results
- Record: 2-1-3

Rock Island downtown street scene, circa 1907

The 1907 Rock Island Independents season marked the first year of a professional football team in Rock Island, Illinois. The team was established at a meeting held September 16 of that year and included former high school and college players living around the area. They were captained and coached by left halfback Lou Weidmann of Pekin, Illinois.

During their inaugural year the Independents played six games, outscoring their opponents 82 to 12 and finishing with a record of 2 wins, 1 loss, and 3 ties. Playing for local bragging rights against two teams from neighboring Moline, Rock Island finished with a record of 1–1–1 and were regarded as the second best of the three clubs.

In 1920, the Rock Island Independents would become a founding member of the American Professional Football Association, forerunner of the National Football League.

== Background ==
A new football team, the Rock Island Independents, was organized at a well-attended meeting held September 16, 1907. The team was organized to compete with the neighboring Moline East Ends, dominant football squad of the tri-cities metropolitan area, which encompassed Rock Island, Moline, and Davenport, Iowa.

The team quickly won the allegiance of speedy Lou Weidmann and John Newman of the Pekin White Sox, as well as several recently graduated stars of Rock Island and Davenport high schools. Manager of the new club was Thomas Kennedy, who handled all game bookings directly. The team's captain and coach was Lou Weidmann of Pekin, Illinois.

== Schedule ==
Game	Date	Opponent	Result	Record	Venue	Attendance	Sources
1	October 6	at Kewanee Regulars	T 0-0	0–0–1			
2	October 13	Muscatine Athletic Club	W 58–0	1–0–1	Island City Park	250	
3	October 20	at Peoria Social Athletic Club	T 6–6	1–0–2			
4	October 27	at Moline East Ends	W 18–0	2–0–2	Moline Athletic Field		
5	November 3	at Moline West Ends	T 0–0	2–0–3	Moline Athletic Field	1,000	
—	November 10	at Kewanee Regulars	cancelled by Rock Island to play Moline				
6	November 10	Moline West Ends	L 0–6	2–1–3	Island City Park	700	
—	November 17	at Wyoming	originally scheduled, no game played				

== Season summary ==
The inaugural edition of the Rock Island Independents saw themselves in a three-cornered race for supremacy of the Tri-Cities, doing battle with the Moline East Ends and the Moline West Ends, respectively. While the East Ends were dispatched handily by a score of 18 to 0, at the end of two 20-minute halves the Moline West Ends and the Independents remained in a scoreless deadlock, with the local championship unresolved.

With winter weather approaching there was pressure to settle the matter of local supremacy with a second contest. A previously scheduled rematch with the Kewanee Regulars was scrapped at the 11th hour by the Independents so that a second Moline West Ends game could be played, this time on the Rock Island home grounds.

In the second Moline West Ends game, John Hall kicked a 4-point field goal for the visitors after 10 minutes of play in the rematch, which would be all the scoring actually needed. The West Ends were driving towards a touchdown later in the first 25-minute half but fumbled the ball away near the goal line. Shortly thereafter Rock Island fullback Harry Coleman was tackled in the end zone for another two points, completing the scoring in Moline West's 6–0 victory.

Various box scores list a total of 20 players for Rock Island during its 1907 campaign, a total which swells to 24 including individuals in the official team photo. No mention is made of any forward pass having been completed. A November 17 game scheduled at the start of the season against tiny Wyoming, Illinois — an obvious mismatch — seems to have been cancelled without notice in the press.

== Roster ==
Team photo of the 1907 Rock Island Independents.

Linemen

- George Behrens
- Burns
- Charton
- Les Corken
- Charles Davis
- Downing
- Harry Fitzsimmons
- Abe Larson
- John Meisinger
- McCaulty
- Fred Melow
- Art Mosenfelder
- "Dutch" Newman
- Palmer
- Charles Rohntree
- Fred Runk
- Polly Runk

Backs

- Will Carse
- Harry Coleman
- Pete Larson
- Carl Reddy
- Art Salzman
- Lou Weidmann - (captain)
- Bill Weisman
