= Johnny Armstrong =

American football player and coach (1897–1960)

Profile
- Position: End, halfback, quarterback

Personal information
- Born: August 10, 1897; Hutchinson, Kansas, U.S.
- Died: April 30, 1960 (aged 62); Dubuque, Iowa, U.S.

Career information
- College: University of Dubuque

Career history

Playing
- Rock Island Independents (1923–1926)

Coaching
- Rock Island Independents (1924, 1926)

Head coaching record
- Career: 7–8–3
- Coaching profile at Pro Football Reference
- Stats at Pro Football Reference

John Allen Armstrong Jr. (August 10, 1897 – April 30, 1960) was an American football player and coach.

Armstrong was born in Hutchinson, Kansas. From 1918 to 1922, he attended the University of Dubuque in Dubuque, Iowa, where he was a four-sport athlete. A quarterback in college, Armstrong helped the school's football team win conference titles in 1919 and 1920. In addition, he received varsity letters in baseball, basketball, and track. Professionally, he played on the Rock Island Independents of the National Football League (NFL), and later the first American Football League, from 1923 to 1926 as an end, halfback, and quarterback. The Green Bay Press-Gazette named Armstrong a third-team All-Pro in 1923. That season, Armstrong was the NFL leader in passing yards and passes intercepted, according to unofficial statistics. In 1924, Armstrong coached the Independents to a 5–2–2 record, and a fifth-place finish. For his last professional football season, 1926, he also served as coach for Rock Island in the AFL; the Independents were 2–6–1 that year.

Armstrong also played minor league baseball for the Watertown Cubs, Dubuque Climbers/Dubs/Ironmen, Oklahoma City Indians, and Davenport Blue Sox from 1921 to 1929. He was the head football and basketball coach at Columbia College—now known as Loras College—in Dubuque, in addition to managing a recreation hall. In 1960, Armstrong died in Dubuque.
