= Dale Johnson =

American football executive (1902–1963)

Personal information
- Born: August 15, 1902; Rock Island, Illinois, U.S.
- Died: April 24, 1963 (aged 60); Muscatine, Iowa, U.S.

Career information
- College: None

Career history

owner
- 1923–1926: Rock Island Independents

Dale Johnson (August 15, 1902 – April 24, 1963) was a local businessman in Rock Island, Illinois, who is best known for his role in the ownership of the Rock Island Independents of the National Football League (NFL) from 1923 until 1925. He took over the team from Walter Flanigan after Flanigan decided to refocus all of his time on his insurance and real estate businesses.

Once he became owner of the team, Johnson made Vince McCarthy, the team's back-up quarterback, his new general manager. He also signed Jim Thorpe to the team in 1924. After the 1925 season, Johnson moved the team to the rival American Football League. Johnson felt that the AFL, which featured Red Grange, would out-perform the NFL. He signed Elmer Layden, one of the Four Horsemen of Notre Dame. However a lack of revenue prevented Johnson from signing and retaining many of his players. As a result, the Independents franchise folded after the 1926 season.
