= Rock Island Independents =

American football team in Rock Island, Illinois

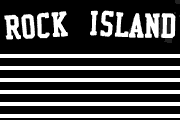
Logo

General information
- Founded: 1907
- Folded: 1926
- Stadium: Douglas Park (1907–1925); Browning Field (1926)
- Headquartered: Rock Island, Illinois, United States
- Colors: Green and white
- Website: http://www.rockislandindependents.com/

Personnel
- Owners: Demetrius Clements (1907–1914); Walter Flanigan (1915–1923); Dale Johnson (1923–1926)
- General manager: Demetrius Clements (1907–1914); Walter Flanigan (1915–1923); Vince McCarthy (1924–1926)
- Head coach: Dick Liitt (1912–1913); Joseph Smith (1914); Walter Flanigan (1915–1916, 1918); Ted Guyer (1917); Rube Ursella (1919–1920, 1925); John Roche (1919); Frank Coughlin (1921); Jimmy Conzelman (1921–1922); Herb Sies (1923); Johnny Armstrong (1924, 1926)

Team history
- Rock Island Independents (1907–1926)

League / conference affiliations
- Independent (1907–1919); National Football League (1920–1925); American Football League (1926)

The Rock Island Independents were a professional American football team, based in Rock Island, Illinois, from 1907 to 1926. The Independents were a founding National Football League franchise. They hosted what has been retrospectively designated the first National Football League game on September 26, 1920, at Douglas Park. The Independents were founded in 1907 by Demetrius Clements as an independent football club. Hence, the team was named the "Independents."

In 1926, the Independents left the NFL to become a charter member of the first American Football League, the only NFL team to do so. The Independents then folded along with the entire league in 1927.

Pro Football Hall of Fame alumni Jimmy Conzelman (1920–1921), Joe Guyon (1924), Ed Healey (1920–1922), Duke Slater (1922–1926), and Jim Thorpe (1924–1925) played for the Independents.

A second, unrelated, "Rock Island Independents" played at the Northwest Football League in 1936.

== History ==
=== Early history ===
One of the first professional football teams, the Independents were founded in Rock Island, Illinois, in 1907 by Demetrius Clements as an independent football club. The independent team had no athletic club affiliation, no social club ties and no corporate company backing or sponsorship. As a result, the team was named the "Independents."

The Independents played in Douglas Park (1907–1925) and Browning Field (1926). The 1910 team went undefeated and were not scored on in five games. A year of hiatus seems to have followed.

The team reorganized in 1912, seeking to compete with the neighboring community of Moline on the gridiron. Many of the players from the 1910 team reunited in that year and, under Coach John Roche, the team won eight games without giving up a score.

Walter Flanigan was the owner of the Independents 1915 to 1923. Dale Johnson then owned the team from 1924 until it folded, along with the rest of the American Football League in 1926.

Walter Flanigan had joined the Independents as a backup end in 1912. For the following two seasons, he served as the team's assistant manager, under then-manager Jack Roche. In 1915, Flanigan became the owner of the team and later promoted the Independents by scheduling two home games in 1917 against the Minneapolis Marines. This contest helped the Independents gain legitimacy. Rock Island lost to the Marines by a score of 7–3 in front of over 6,400 fans at Douglas Park in the first game on November 4. The two teams played again on November 18 and Rock Island lost again, 33–7, in the second game in front of 4,500 fans. However, World War I and the military draft put a temporary halt to Flanigan's plans of expanding the team into new markets.

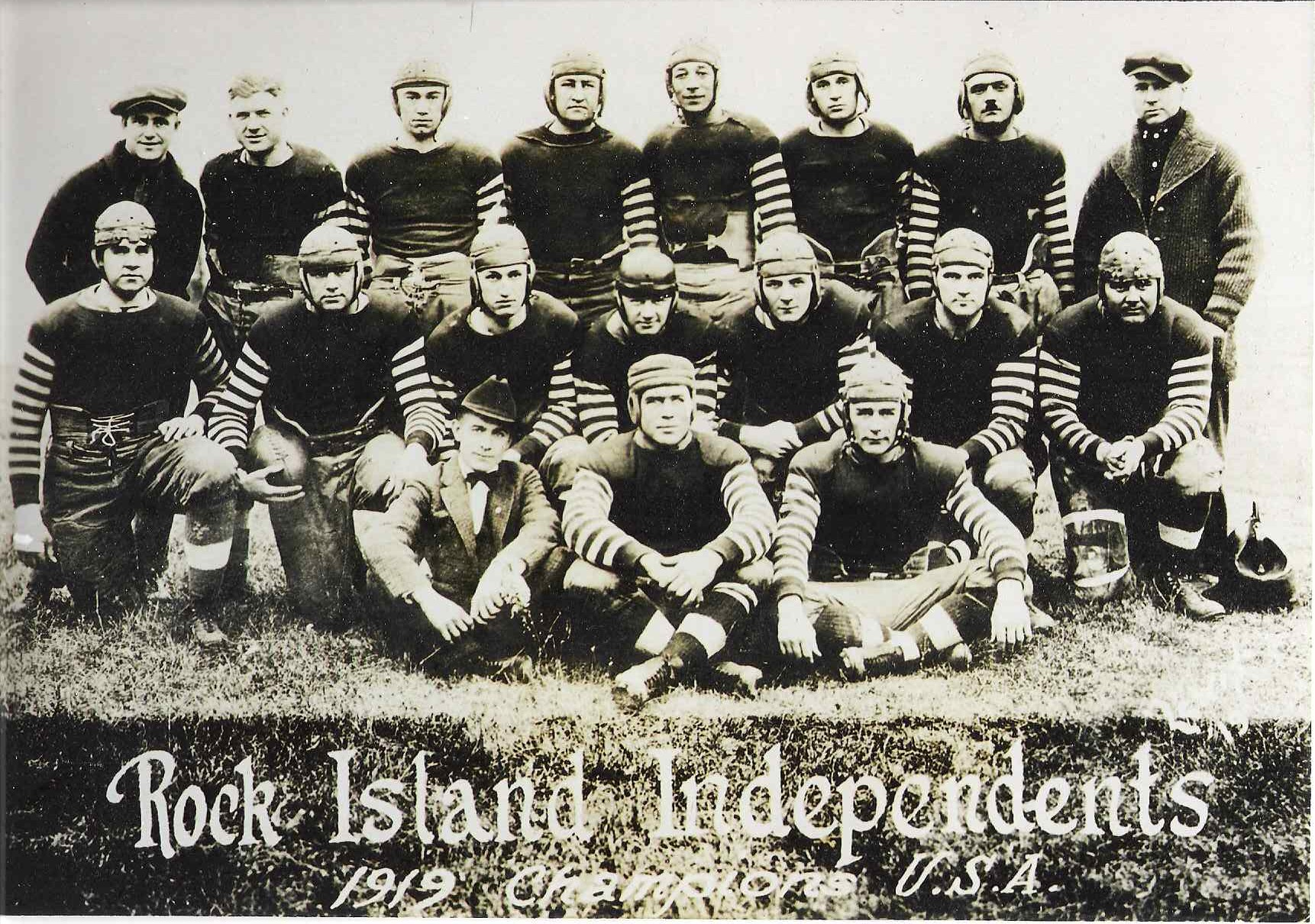
The Rock Island Independents in 1919, "Champions of the USA"

In 1919, Flanigan hired Rube Ursella of the Minneapolis Marines to serve as a player-coach. Ursella brought several other Minneapolis players with him. These new players would help improve play and help secure the team an invitation to join the NFL. The Independents lost only to the Hammond Pros, led by George Halas in 1919. Flanigan then challenged the Canton Bulldogs to a "championship" game, offering a $5,000 guarantee if they would come to Rock Island for the game.

But Canton, which had already won the "Ohio League" championship by defeating the Massillon Tigers, turned down the offer. It is likely that Canton's player/coach Jim Thorpe and owner Ralph Hay felt that Flanigan could not deliver on his $5,000 guarantee. However, the Independents still had defeated the Columbus Panhandles 49–0 and the Indians 17–0 that season. In 1919, the season prior to the establishment of the National Football League, they claimed to be "Champions of the USA". The invitation to Canton led to the Independents being invited to the September 17, 1920 historic meeting on the formation of the National Football League.

=== National Football League ===
The National Football League was formed over the course of two meetings in 1920. On August 20, 1920, an initial meeting was held by representatives of the Akron Pros, Canton Bulldogs, Cleveland Tigers, and Dayton Triangles. The meeting was held at the Jordan and Hupmobile auto showroom in Canton, Ohio and resulted in the formation of the American Professional Football Conference (APFC).

A second and considerably larger meeting was held on September 17, 1920. The meeting was again at Canton owner Ralph Hay's Hupmobile dealership in Canton and Independents owner Walter Flanigan was present to represent the Independents. Representatives of eleven teams were present at the second meeting: the four teams from the first meeting, plus the Decatur Staleys, Chicago Cardinals, Massillon Tigers, Hammond Pros, Muncie Flyers, Rock Island Independents and Rochester Jeffersons. The minutes of this meeting are in Pro Football Hall of Fame archives. The league was renamed to the American Professional Football Association (APFA), and the number of teams was expanded, with league play to begin in 1920.

Douglas Park, home venue of the Independents, in 1920. Football yard lines can be seen carved in the infield grass, giving an idea of field configuration for football.

The newly formed league elected Jim Thorpe as its first President and consisted of 14 teams. The Buffalo All-Americans, Chicago Tigers, Columbus Panhandles, and Detroit Heralds joined the league during the year. The Massillon Tigers from Massillon, Ohio was also at the September 17 meeting, but did not field a team in 1920. After the formation of the league, Flanigan was named to the committee that created the league's constitution. Today, only two of these franchises, the Decatur Staleys (now the Chicago Bears) and the Chicago Cardinals (now the Arizona Cardinals), remain as NFL franchises.

On September 26, 1920, the Independents hosted the first official game featuring a team from the APFA. Thus, the Independents' Douglas Park became the site of the first ever National Football League contest. Just nine days after the league had formed, on September 26, 1920, the Independents defeated the St. Paul Ideals 48–0 in the first contest involving a member team of the APFA.

A week later, on October 3, 1920, the Independents defeated the Muncie Flyers 45–0 at Douglas Park in the first full week of APFA league play. 3,100 fans were in attendance as Arnie Wyman, former Minnesota great, made his debut for the Islanders, scoring three touchdowns. This might have been the first NFL game ever played between two NFL teams, however, NFL historical records don't indicate the kickoff time for this game or the other APFA game played that day between the Dayton Triangles and the Columbus Panhandles in Dayton, Ohio.

The Independents posted 4–2–1 records in the league's first year. They had the same record the next two seasons, with five of their six losses in three years coming to George Halas and the Decatur Staleys/Chicago Staleys/Chicago Bears. On June 24, 1922, the APFA changed its name to the National Football League (NFL).

On October 16, 1921, the Independents battled back from a 7–0 deficit against the Chicago Cardinals to lead 14–7 in the second quarter. The comeback was sparked by two touchdowns, scored by player-coach Frank Coughlin. Flanigan then ordered the team's tackle, Ed Healey relieve Coughlin. Once Coughlin was safely on his way toward the sideline, Healey delivered a message to Jimmy Conzelman from Flanigan, it read: "Coughlin was fired! The new coach was Conzelman!" This act marked the first and only time an owner hired a new coach in the middle of a game. In 1922, Flanigan sold the contract of Ed Healey, to Halas and the Chicago Bears for $100. However, Healey soon became a star for the Bears and would later be inducted into the Pro Football Hall of Fame in 1964. In 1923, Flanigan left the Independents to concentrate on his real estate and insurance businesses.

In 1923, Flanigan sold the Independents to Dale Johnson, a local businessman. Johnson hired Vince McCarthy, the Independents' back-up quarterback as the new general manager. With Rock Island High School alumni and Olympian Sol Butler joining the squad, Rock Island went 2–3–3 in 1923, and rebounded to post winning seasons in 1924 and 1925.

Jim Thorpe, considered "the World's Greatest Athlete", joined the Independents in 1924 and the team went 5–2–2 in league play. After the 1925 season, Thorpe formed a team composed primarily of his teammates from the Rock Island Independents, that would play several games throughout Florida. In a 1926 New Year's Day football exhibition, Thorpe's "Tampa Cardinals" played against the Chicago Bears led by Red Grange. The game itself was billed as a clash of old vs. new, with Grange, the rising star, taking on Thorpe, the aging legend. During the game Grange rushed for a 70-yard touchdown as the Bears notched a 17–3 victory at Plant Field in Tampa, Florida.

The Independents' overall NFL record was 26–14–9, with five winning seasons in six years. After finishing fourth in 1920, their best overall finish in the National Football League standings was fifth, which they accomplished three times: in 1921 and 1922 under Jimmy Conzelman, and in 1924 under Johnny Armstrong.

=== American Football League ===
The 1926 American Football League had teams playing in nine U.S. cities, including Rock Island and the traveling Los Angeles franchise.

In 1926, football star Red Grange and his agent, C. C. Pyle, formed the American Football League (AFL) after Pyle was denied ownership of an NFL franchise in New York City. In what proved to be a fatal move, after the 1925 season Johnson moved the team to the American Football League. Johnson felt that the American Football League, which featured Red Grange, would out-perform the NFL. The Independents then signed Elmer Layden, one of the Four Horsemen of Notre Dame for 1926. Founding American Football League teams for 1926 were the Boston Bulldogs, Brooklyn Horsemen, Chicago Bulls, Cleveland Panthers, Los Angeles Wildcats, Newark Bears, New York Yankees, Philadelphia Quakers and the Rock Island Independents. Rock Island left the NFL to join the new league. The Independents also moved from Douglas Park in Rock Island to Browning Field in neighboring Moline, Illinois for the 1926 season. The Independents were the only NFL team to make the jump to the rival league.

The AFL did not pay as much as the NFL did a year prior and Independents players left the team for bigger salaries with other NFL teams. As a result, the Independents ended their season with a 2–6–1 record. Coached by Johnny Armstrong, the Independents played their first three games at Browning Field and then played the rest of their 1926 games as a traveling team. The AFL folded after the season and the Independents were rejected in their attempt to rejoin the NFL. They played as a semi-pro team in 1927, and then went out of business.

== Stadium ==
The Independents played at Douglas Park in Rock Island, Illinois, from 1907 to 1925. In 1926, in what became their final year of existence, the Independents moved to Browning Field in neighboring Moline, Illinois. Both locations are still in use today.

Douglas Park is located at the corner of 18th Avenue and 9th Street in Rock Island, Illinois. Douglas Park was also the home of the minor league baseball Rock Island Islanders during the Independents era. Today, the site has baseball fields, soccer fields, and a playground. The Quad City 76ers Semi Pro Baseball Club has called Douglas Park home since 1986. Rock Island Post 200 also plays some home games at Douglas Park. Douglas Park also hosts annual "rivalry" games. The Rocktown Showdown features the baseball teams from Alleman and Rock Island High Schools. The Battle for the Douglas Cup features Rock Island and Moline High Schools. And, the Veterans Cup Classic features the American Legion teams from Rock Island and Moline. Douglas Park hosts an annual tribute football game to the Independents, played in retro uniforms and using early football rules.

Browning Field, the Independents' home in 1926, is located at 16th Street and 23rd Avenue in Moline, Illinois. The Independents shared the stadium with the minor league baseball Moline Plowboys. Today, Browning Field is home to Moline High School sports teams and the adjacent Wharton Field House is the former home of the National Basketball Association's Tri-Cities Blackhawks, today's Atlanta Hawks.

== Notable players ==
Rock Island Independents Hall of Famers
Players
No.	Name	Position	Tenure	Inducted
—	Jimmy Conzelman	HB/QB	1921–1922	1964
—	Joe Guyon	T/HB	1924	1966
—	Ed Healey	T, G, End	1920–1922	1964
—	Jim Thorpe	Back	1924–1925	1963
—	Duke Slater	T	1922–1926	2020

== Season-by-season results ==
Year	W	L	T	Finish	Coach
1907	2	1	3		
1908	4	0	0		
1909	0	3	0		
1910	5	0	0		
1911	Did not play				
1912	8	0	0		Dick Liitt
1913	6	0	1		Dick Liitt
1914	5	2	0		Joseph Smith
1915	5	1	1		Walter Flanigan
1916	5	3	1		Walter Flanigan
1917	7	3	0		Ted Guyer
1918	5	0	0		Walter Flanigan
1919	9	1	1		Rube Ursella, John Roche
Joined the American Professional Football Association
1920	6	2	2	3rd	Rube Ursella
1921	4	2	1	5th	Frank Coughlin, Jimmy Conzelman
AFPA is renamed the National Football League
1922	4	2	1	5th	Jimmy Conzelman
1923	2	3	3	12th	Herb Sies
1924	5	2	2	5th	Johnny Armstrong
1925	5	3	3	8th	Rube Ursella
Moved to American Football League (1926)
1926	2	6	1	7th	Johnny Armstrong
AFPA/NFL-AFL Totals	28	20	13		

== Notable games ==
=== Independent ===
- November 19, 1916. Defeated Moline Indians 21–3. Douglas Park. 3,000 in attendance
- November 4, 1917. Lost to Minneapolis Marines 7–3. Douglas Park 6,400.
- November 18, 1917. Lost to Minneapolis Marines 33–7. Douglas Park. 4,500.
- October 12, 1919. Lost to Hammond All-Stars 12–7. Douglas Park. 7,000.
- November 19, 1919. Defeated Moline Fans Association 57–0. Douglas Park. 2,000.

=== AFPA ===
- September 26, 1920. Defeated St. Paul Ideals 48–0. Douglas Park. 800. First NFL Game.
- October 3, 1920. Defeated Muncie Flyers 45–0. Douglas Park. 3,100.
- October 17, 1920. Lost to Decatur Staleys 7–0. Douglas Park. 7,000.
- November 7, 1920 Tied Decatur Staleys 0–0. Douglas Park. 4,991.
- October 2, 1921. Tied Detroit Tigers 0–0. Douglas Park. 3,304.
- October 16, 1921. Defeated Chicago Cardinals 14–7. Normal Park Chicago. 4,000.
- October 23, 1921. Defeated Detroit Tigers 14–0. Tiger Stadium. 3000.
- October 30, 1921. Defeated Green Bay Packers 13–3. Hagemeister Park Green Bay. 6,000.
- November 13, 1921. Lost to Chicago Staleys 0–3. (Cubs Park). 2,500.

=== NFL ===
- October 1, 1922. Defeated Green Bay Packers. 19–14. Douglas Park. 3,500.
- October 8, 1922. Lost to Chicago Bears 6–10. Douglas Park. 4,749.
- November 19, 1922 Lost to Chicago Bears 3–0. Cubs Park (Wrigley Field) 5,600.
- September 30, 1923. Defeated Chicago Bears 3–0. Douglas Park. 3,500.
- November 18, 1923. Lost to Chicago Bears 7–3. Cubs Park (Wrigley Field) 6,500.
- December 9, 1923. Lost to Chicago Bears 29–7. Cubs Park (Wrigley Field) 6,000.
- September 28, 1924. Tied Chicago Bears 0–0. Douglas Park. 4,500.
- November 2, 1934. Tied Chicago Bears 3–3. Cubs Park (Wrigley Field) 6,000.
- December 14, 1924. Defeated Chicago Bears 7–6. Cubs Park (Wrigley Field) 7,000.
- September 29, 1925. Tied Chicago Bears 0–0. Douglas Park. 2,000.
- October 4, 1925. Defeated Green Bay Packers 3–0. Douglas Park. 3,000.
- October 18, 1925. Lost to Green Bay Packers 0–20. City Stadium. 7,000.
- November 1, 1925. Lost to Chicago Bears 6–0. Cubs Park (Wrigley Field) 8,000.
- November 26, 1925. Defeated Detroit Panthers 6–3. Tiger Stadium.
- November 29, 1925. Lost to Chicago Cardinals 0–7. Comiskey Park. 3,000.

=== AFL ===
- November 2, 1926. Lost to New York Yankees 35–0. Yankee Stadium. 35,000.
- November 21, 1926. Lost to Chicago Bulls 3–0. Comiskey Park. 1,800.
