= Rube Ursella =

American football player and coach (1890–1980)

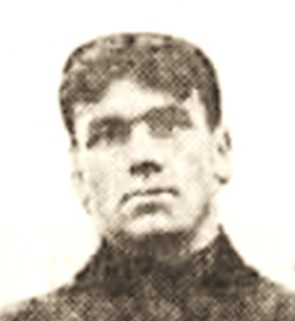

Profile
- Positions: Quarterback, Fullback, Halfback

Personal information
- Born: January 11, 1890; Minneapolis, Minnesota, U.S.
- Died: February 1, 1980 (aged 90)
- Listed height: 5 ft 9 in (1.75 m)
- Listed weight: 172 lb (78 kg)

Career information
- College: None

Career history

Playing
- 1907–1917, 1921, 1927–1928: Minneapolis Marines/Red Jackets
- 1916: West Duluth
- 1917, 1919–1920, 1924–1925: Rock Island Independents
- 1918: 604th Engineering Regiment
- 1922–1923: Hibbing All-Stars
- 1923: Tollefson's All-Stars
- 1926: Tampa Cardinals
- 1926: Akron Indians
- 1926: Hammond Pros

Coaching
- 1912, 1917, 1921: Minneapolis Marines
- 1919-1920, 1925: Rock Island Independents
- Coaching profile at Pro Football Reference

Reuben John (“Rube” or “Ruby”) Ursella (January 11, 1890 – February 1, 1980) was a professional football player-coach who played during the early years of the National Football League (NFL). During his NFL career, Rube played for the Minneapolis Marines/Red Jackets, Akron Indians, Hammond Pros, and Rock Island Independents. Outside of the NFL, Ursella played for the Hibbing All-Stars in 1922 and 1923 and Tollefson's All-Stars in 1923, and in January 1926, he also played exhibition games with Jim Thorpe and his independent team, the Tampa Cardinals.

== Biography ==
Before World War I, Reuben Ursella played eleven years (1907–1917) mainly at quarterback for the Minneapolis Marines sandlot, semi-professional, and independent professional football teams. During that stint, he played as a ringer for West Duluth in 1916 and for the Rock Island Independents in 1917.

During World War I, Ursella served in the 604th Engineering Regiment and he played football for the unit's service team in France.

When he returned home, Ursella chose to coach and play for Rock Island and he led the team to a self-proclaimed national championship in 1919. He stayed to coach and play again in 1920 when the Independents joined the American Professional Football Association, later renamed the National Football League.

In 1921, Ursella returned to the Marines to play during the team's inaugural season in the National Football League. He then traveled north to play for the Hibbing All-Stars in 1922 and 1923 and he played for the Tollefson's All-Stars exhibition team in 1923. Ursella then returned to Rock Island to play the 1924 and 1925 seasons in the NFL. When Rock Island joined the American Football League in 1926, Ursella chose instead to play for the Akron Indians and for one game with the Hammond Pros. He holds the distinction of having played in the final game for three separate NFL franchises, for the Rock Island Independents in 1925 and for the Hammond Pros and Akron Indians in 1926.

Ursella in the green-and-white uniform of the Rock Island Independents, 1920.

In January 1926, Rube joined the Tampa Cardinals a team put together by Jim Thorpe for the purpose of playing exhibition games in Florida. The team lost a New Year's Day game to Red Grange and the Chicago Bears and afterward played a series of games against the Millville Big Blue, playing under the banner of the Haven-Villa of Winter Haven.

In 1927 and 1928, Ursella played with the Minneapolis Marines exhibition team against NFL opponents. In 1929, he played his final season for the Minneapolis Red Jackets in the NFL.

During his 22 seasons as a quarterback, captain, and coach, Reuben Ursella stood out as a strategist, field general, and dominating athlete despite the fact he never played high school or college football. Before the Minneapolis Marines turned professional in 1913, many colleges sought out his services but Ursella could not afford to attend university.

=== Coach and Captain ===
Ursella was the mastermind behind successful Minneapolis Marines, Rock Island Independents, and Hibbing All-Stars offenses, and on all three teams, he installed his version of the Minnesota Shift, an offense developed by University of Minnesota coach Dr. Henry L. Williams. “Rube knows the Minnesota Shift about as well as Coach Williams of Minnesota university, its originator,” wrote sportswriter J. L. Hughes in the Rock Island Argus.

Across seven seasons, with Ursella at the helm, from 1911 to 1917, the Marines would use the Minnesota Shift to outscore opponents 1,539 to 156, nearly a 10:1 ratio. Ursella then used the Minnesota Shift with the Rock Island Independents in 1919 to outscore opponents 309–12, a 25:1 ratio.

On the field, Ursella was "the guiding spirit of the [Minneapolis] Marines offense," observed the St. Paul Pioneer Press. The Hibbing Daily News, impressed by Ursella’s performance, said Ursella “ran the team brilliantly” and "is in a class by himself as a quarterback."

=== Quarterback ===
As an athlete, Ursella stood out for his kicking ability, in punting, drop-kicking, and place-kicking, and he once made a 54-yard drop-kick field goal in 1913. Ossie Solem, who had played for the Gophers under Williams and then later coached the Marines and at Luther College (Iowa), Drake University, Syracuse University, and Springfield College, told the Minneapolis Star Tribune in 1960 that Ursella was “the best kicker football has ever had," an echo of the sentiment shared by Halsey Hall in the Minneapolis Star in 1954 when he said Ursella was “the greatest kicker of local and possibly national history." Ursella’s former teammate and manager, John Dunn, who served as NFL vice president from 1922–1928, in later years told the Minneapolis Star that he felt Ursella and Paddy Driscoll were the best professional players he had ever seen play, and that “Rube was the better all-around player, could do more.” Ursella often ran with the ball around the ends, and he returned kicks. In 1925, the News-Record in Neenah, Wisconsin, observed that Ursella "has all the qualities of an ideal football player, brains, speed, and is a fighter to the last whistle.”

Ursella was the leading scorer for the 1912, 1913, and 1917 Marines and for the 1919 Rock Island Independents. He scored at least 101 points on 12 touchdowns, either through the air or on the ground, plus five field goals and 14 extra points with the Minneapolis Marines in 1913. In 1919, he scored at least 106 points on 11 touchdowns, four field goal attempts, and 28 extra points. On defense, he played safety and stopped wayward opposing runners from reaching the end zone.

=== Professional Baseball ===
Reuben Ursella pitched for the Superior Red Sox (1912) in the Central International League, the Virginia Ore Diggers (1913-14) and Grand Forks Flickertails (1915) in the Northern League, pitched in spring training with the Milwaukee Brewers of the American Association (1916), and pitched for the Butte, Montana, Amalgamated Copper Mining Company (1922) in the Mines League (1922).
