= Jimmy Conzelman =

American football player and coach (1898–1970)

- Conzelman as the new coach of the Chicago Cardinals, 1941

No. 15, 2, 1, 9
- Positions: Halfback, blocking back

Personal information
- Born: March 6, 1898; St. Louis, Missouri, U.S.
- Died: July 31, 1970 (aged 72); St. Louis, Missouri, U.S.
- Listed height: 6 ft 0 in (1.83 m)
- Listed weight: 175 lb (79 kg)

Career information
- High school: McKinley (St. Louis)
- College: Washington University

Career history

Playing
- Decatur Staleys (1920); Rock Island Independents (1921–1922); Milwaukee Badgers (1922–1924); Detroit Panthers (1925–1926); Providence Steam Roller (1927–1929)

Coaching
- Rock Island Independents (1921–1922) Head coach; Milwaukee Badgers (1922–1924) Head coach; Detroit Panthers (1925–1926) Head coach; Providence Steam Roller (1927–1929) Head coach; St. Louis Gunners (1931) Head coach; Washington University (1932–1939) Head coach; Chicago Cardinals (1940–1942, 1946–1948) Head coach

Awards and highlights
- 2× NFL champion (1928, 1947); 2× Second-team All-Pro (1923, 1925); NFL 1920s All-Decade Team; Arizona Cardinals Ring of Honor

Career NFL statistics
- Rushing touchdowns: 16
- Games played: 104
- Stats at Pro Football Reference

Head coaching record
- Career: 87–63–18 (.571)
- Coaching profile at Pro Football Reference
- Pro Football Hall of Fame

James Gleason Dunn Conzelman (March 6, 1898 – July 31, 1970) was an American professional football player and coach, baseball executive, and advertising executive. He was inducted into the Pro Football Hall of Fame in 1964 and was selected in 1969 as a quarterback on the National Football League 1920s All-Decade Team.

A native of St. Louis, Conzelman played college football for the 1918 Great Lakes Navy Bluejackets team that won the 1919 Rose Bowl. In 1919, he was an All-Missouri Valley Conference quarterback for the Washington University Pikers football team. He then played 10 seasons as a quarterback, halfback, placekicker, and coach in the National Football League (NFL) for the Decatur Staleys (1920), Rock Island Independents (1921–1922), Milwaukee Badgers (1922–1924), Detroit Panthers (1925–1926), and Providence Steam Roller (1927–1929). He was also a team owner in Detroit and, as player-coach, led the 1928 Providence Steam Roller team to an NFL championship. He would also briefly compete with the short-lived Detroit Lions basketball team within the original American Basketball League.

From 1932 to 1939, Conzelman was the head football coach for the Washington University Bears football team, leading the program to Missouri Valley Conference championships in 1934, 1935, and 1939. He served as head coach of the NFL's Chicago Cardinals from 1940 to 1942 and again from 1946 to 1948. He led the Cardinals to an NFL championship in 1947 and Western Division championships in 1947 and 1948. He was also an executive with the St. Louis Browns in Major League Baseball from 1943 to 1945.

== Early life ==
Conzelman was born James Gleason Ryan Dunn in St. Louis, Missouri, in 1898. He was the son of James Dunn and Marguerite Ryan, though his father died when he was still a baby. In 1902, his mother married a dentist, Oscar Conzelman, who adopted him.

Conzelman attended Loyola Academy and later Central High School in St. Louis. He began playing football as a halfback at Central High in 1914. After a realignment of high school districts in 1915, Conzelman attended McKinley High School. At McKinley, Conzelman was the quarterback of the football team, competed on the basketball and track teams, was president of the boys' athletic association, and served as sergeant-at-arms of the Class of 1916. He led the 1915 McKinley football team to a league championship.

== College and military service ==
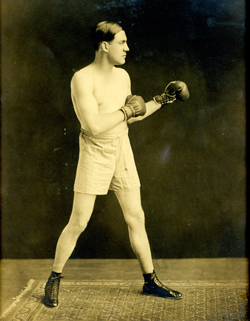
Conzelman as a boxer

Conzelman enrolled at Washington University in St. Louis in 1916. He played freshman football that year but enlisted in the United States Navy when the United States entered World War I in 1917. He was stationed at the Great Lakes Naval Station north of Chicago. During two years of service, he played for the Naval Station's football, baseball, and basketball teams. He also took up boxing while in the Navy and won a championship in the middleweight division.

Conzelman was the quarterback of the 1918 Great Lakes Navy Bluejackets football team that defeated previously undefeated Navy and then defeated the Mare Island Marines by a 17–0 score in the 1919 Rose Bowl. Conzelman's teammates on the 1918 Great Lakes team included George Halas and Paddy Driscoll, all three of whom were later inducted into the Pro Football Hall of Fame.

After the war, Conzelman turned down offers to become a professional boxer and returned to Washington University in February 1919. He played for the 1919 Washington Pikers football team that compiled a 5–2 record and outscored opponents 127 to 30. Conzelman was selected as the All-Missouri Valley Conference quarterback for 1919. He also was the catcher for the 1920 Washington University baseball team and organized an orchestra, played banjo, and wrote songs while attending Washington University.

During the spring semester of 1920, Conzelman lost his eligibility to play football due to academic deficiencies. His father had also died in May 1919, and he withdrew from school to help support his mother and younger siblings. In June 1920, Conzelman announced that he would not return to Washington University in the fall. He spent the summer leading an orchestra in Arkansas.

== Professional football player ==
=== Decatur Staleys ===
In mid-October 1920, Conzelman joined the Decatur Staleys (later renamed the Chicago Bears) of the newly formed American Professional Football Association (later renamed the NFL). He planned to relocate permanently to Decatur and also play for the Staleys baseball and basketball teams. Conzelman was reunited at Decatur with player-coach George Halas, with whom Conzelman had played on the 1918 Great Lakes team. In Conzelman's first game with the Staleys, he scored the game's only touchdown on a 43-yard run. Playing at the halfback position, Conzelman handled punting, placekicking and passing for the Staleys in the important games and was selected as a second-team player on the 1920 All-Pro team. The 1920 Staleys compiled a 10–1–2 record and finished in second place in the league.

=== Rock Island Independents ===
Conzelman in the green-and-white uniform of the Rock Island Independents, 1921

In October 1921, Conzelman joined the Rock Island Independents as the team's captain and coach. At age 23, he was one of the youngest coaches in NFL history. He led Rock Island to a 4–1 record during the 1921 season.

=== Milwaukee Badgers ===
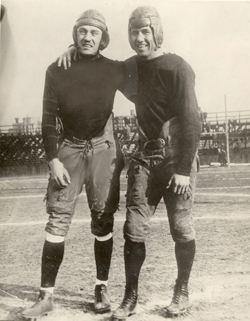
Jimmy Conzelman and Bo McMillin, 1922

After starting the season with Rock Island, Conzelman signed with the Milwaukee Badgers in the middle of their 1922 season. He was the Badgers' coach and a player for the final three games of the 1922 season during which the team went 0–3.

During the 1923 season, Conzelman, as player and coach, led the Badgers to a 7–2–3 record and a third-place finish out of 20 teams in the NFL. Conzelman was also the team's second-highest scorer with four touchdowns and two extra points. During the 1924 season, Conzelman remained with the Badgers as a player only. The team's record fell to 5–8 and 12th place in the NFL.

=== Detroit Panthers ===
In 1925, Conzelman organized and became the owner of a new NFL franchise in Detroit, which he named the Detroit Panthers. He reportedly paid a franchise fee of only $50 to the NFL to acquire the Detroit franchise. In addition to being the owner, Conzelman was also the team's coach and a player during the 1925 and 1926 NFL seasons. During the 1925 season, Conzelman's Detroit club compiled an 8–2–2 record, played at Navin Field, and outscored opponents by a combined total of 129 to 39.

During the 1926 season, the Panthers dropped to 4–6–2 and compiled a record of 0–3–2 in the month of November. The team's attendance in Detroit was approximately 3,000 persons per game, not enough for Conzelman to make a profit. Accordingly, in August 1927, Conzelman sold the Detroit franchise back to the NFL for $1,200. Conzelman later recalled: "We simply were ahead of our time in Detroit. The town wasn't quite ready for pro football."

=== Providence Steam Roller ===
In August 1927, following his decision to sell the Detroit franchise back to the league, Conzelman signed as a player, manager and coach for the Providence Steam Roller. Conzelman brought players Gus Sonnenberg and Eddie Lynch with him from Detroit. Conzelman and Wildcat Wilson were the leading scorers on the 1927 Providence team, each with four touchdowns. The Steam Roller finished the 1927 season an 8–5–1 record and a fifth-place finish in the NFL.

Conzelman led the 1928 Providence team to an 8–1–2 record and the club's first NFL championship. The team's passing combination of Wildcat Wilson to Conzelman was the most effective in the league and accounted for most of the club's yardage until Conzelman twisted knee ligaments on a reception against the Yankees. Despite being unable to play in the second half of the season due to the injury, Conzelman was unanimously voted by his teammates as the team's most valuable player.

In his final season as an NFL player-coach, Conzelman led the 1929 Providence team to a 4–6–2 record.

== Coaching career ==
=== Rock Island Islanders baseball ===
In 1922, Conzelman was the player/manager of the Rock Island Islanders minor league baseball team in the Class D level Mississippi Valley League. An outfielder, Conzelman batted .244 while playing in 104 games as the Islanders finished in third place in the six-team league with a 66–63 record.

=== St. Louis Gunners ===
In the fall of 1931, Conzelman served as the head coach of the St. Louis Gunners, an independent professional football team sponsored by a local field artillery unit of the National Guard. The Gunners posted a 5–2–1 record in 1931. After a game against the NFL's Chicago Cardinals, Chicago captain Ernie Nevers called the Gunners the "best independent club we have ever faced."

=== Washington University ===
In January 1932, Conzelman returned to Washington University in St. Louis as the school's head football coach. He became the school's first alumnus to lead the football team. Over the next eight years, Conzelman led Washington University Bears football team to Missouri Valley Conference championships in 1934, 1935, and 1939, and compiled an overall record of 40–35–2.

In January 1940, Conzelman tendered his resignation as head coach of the Washington University football team, but the resignation was not accepted by the athletic board. The university chancellor directed Conzelman to attend an alumni rally in his support. Conzelman appeared and announced that he would not withdraw his resignation, though he would continue to support the program from the outside. Newspaper accounts indicate that he may have been fired under pressure from a powerful "anti-Conzelman" group of alumni in downtown St. Louis.

=== Chicago Cardinals (first stint) ===
In April 1940, Conzelman was hired as the head coach of the NFL's Chicago Cardinals. He replaced Ernie Nevers in the position. In his first stint as head coach of the Cardinals, Conzelmean served three years with the Cardinals from 1940 to 1942, leading the club to a combined three-year record of 8–22.

=== St. Louis Browns ===
Conzelman's tenure as head coach of the Cardinals was interrupted by a two-years stint as an administrator in Major League Baseball for the St. Louis Browns. In June 1943, he resigned his job as head coach of the Cardinals and was hired as director of public relations and assistant to Donald Lee Barnes, president and owner of the Browns. He remained with the Browns for two years and was said to be the "secret weapon" of the 1944 St. Louis Browns team that won the American League pennant. Conzelman resigned his post with the club in August 1945.

=== Chicago Cardinals (second stint) ===
In late November 1945, Conzelman was hired for a second time to serve as head coach of the Chicago Cardinals starting with the 1946 NFL season. During the 1947 season, the Cardinals with their "Million Dollar Backfield" compiled a 9–3 record and defeated the Philadelphia Eagles in the 1947 NFL Championship Game.

Conzelman's 1948 Cardinals team compiled an 11–1 record during the regular season, led the NFL in offense with an average of 32.9 points per game, and lost to the Eagles in the 1948 NFL Championship Game. In their second stint under Conzelman, the Cardinals compiled a 26–9 record from 1946 to 1948.

On January 7, 1949, three weeks after the loss in the 1948 Championship Game, Conzelman resigned as the Cardinals' head coach. He had been working for D'Arcy Advertising Co. for the prior two years during the off-season and stated that he was resigning his coaching position to devote his full efforts to the advertising firm. The Cardinals' management said at the time that Conzelman's resignation was unexpected and "came like a bolt from the blue."

== Later years and honors ==
After resigning as coach of the Cardinals in 1949, Conzelman continued working as an advertising executive. He also made occasional appearances in stage and opera productions.

Conzelman was the model for the fallen French soldier in the 1926 monument by Frederick MacMonnies of the Battle of the Marne at Meaux, France.

During his retirement and posthumously, Conzelman received numerous honors for his contributions to the sport of football. These honors include the following:

- In February 1964, Conzelman was chosen by a committee on which he served to be part of the Pro Football Hall of Fame's second induction class. Conzelman objected to his selection, but the committee selected him by acclamation in a voice vote that prevented Conzelman from raising a dissent. United States Supreme Court Justice William O. Douglas gave the introduction speech when Conzelman was inducted into the Pro Football Hall of Fame.
- Conzelman was nominated for the College Football Hall of Fame in 1967, but did not receive sufficient votes for induction.
- In September 1968, a plaque honoring Conzelman was dedicated at Busch Memorial Stadium in St. Louis.
- In August 1969, Conzelman was selected by the Pro Football Hall of Fame as a quarterback on the NFL 1920s All-Decade Team.
- In June 1992, Conzelman was posthumously selected for the Washington University Athletic Hall of Fame as one of the 14 inaugural inductees.
- In August 2006, Conzelman was one of the eight charter members of the Arizona Cardinals Ring of Honor.

== Personal life ==
Conzelman was married three times. He was married to Peggy Udell (or Unertl), a Ziegfeld Follies performer, in October 1923. In July 1924, Udell sued for divorce seeking support for an unborn child. The trial of the divorce action was postponed in July 1925 following the birth of the child. Conzelman and Udell were ultimately divorced in 1930. Conzelman's second marriage to Lilian Adele Conzelman ended in divorce in October 1935. He married his third wife, Anna Forrestal, in December 1936. Conzelman and his third wife had a son, James D. Conzelman Jr. They remained married at the time of Conzelman's death.

Conzelman died in July 1970 at age 72 at Missouri Baptist Hospital. He was buried at Calvary Cemetery and Mausoleum in St. Louis.

== Head coaching record ==
=== College ===
Year	Team	Overall	Conference	Standing	Bowl/playoffs
Washington University Bears (Missouri Valley Conference) (1932–1939)
1932	Washington University	4–4	1–2	4th	
1933	Washington University	4–5	1–2	4th	
1934	Washington University	7–3	1–0	1st	
1935	Washington University	6–4	3–0	T–1st	
1936	Washington University	3–7	1–1	4th	
1937	Washington University	4–6	2–2	T–4th	
1938	Washington University	6–3–1	2–1–1	T–2nd	
1939	Washington University	6–3–1	4–1	1st	
Washington University:		40–35–2	15–9–1		
Total:		40–35–2			
National championship Conference title Conference division title or championship game berth

=== NFL ===
Team	Year	Regular season					Post season			
Team	Year	Won	Lost	Ties	Win %	Finish	Won	Lost	Win %	Result
RII*	1921	4	1	0	.800	5th in NFL	–	–	–	–
RII	1922	4	2	1	.667	left after 7 games	–	–	–	–
RII total		8	3	1	.727	–	–	–	–	
MIL+	1922	0	3	0	.000	11th in NFL	–	–	–	–
MIL	1923	7	2	3	.778	3rd in NFL	–	–	–	–
MIL total		7	5	3	.583	–	–	–	–	
DET	1925	8	2	2	.800	3rd in NFL	–	–	–	–
DET	1926	4	6	2	.400	12th in NFL	–	–	–	–
DET total		12	8	4	.600	–	–	–	–	
PSR	1927	8	5	1	.615	5th in NFL	–	–	–	–
PSR	1928	8	1	2	.889	1st in NFL	–	–	–	NFL Champions
PSR	1929	4	6	2	.400	8th in NFL	–	–	–	–
PSR	1930	6	4	1	.600	5th in NFL	–	–	–	–
PSR total		26	16	6	.619	–	–	–	–	
CHI	1940	2	7	2	.222	5th in NFL Western	–	–	–	–
CHI	1941	3	7	1	.300	4th in NFL Western	–	–	–	–
CHI	1942	3	8	0	.273	4th in NFL Western	–	–	–	–
CHI	1946	6	5	0	.545	T-3rd in NFL Western	–	–	–	–
CHI	1947	9	3	0	.750	1st in NFL Western	1	0	1.000	Defeated the Philadelphia Eagles in 1947 NFL Championship
CHI	1948	11	1	0	.917	1st in NFL Western	0	1	.000	Lost to the Philadelphia Eagles in 1948 NFL Championship
CHI total		34	31	3	.523	–	1	1	.500	
Total		87	63	17	.580	–	1	1	.500	

*Only coached the last 5 games of the season to replace Frank Coughlin

+Only coached the last 3 games of the season to replace Budge Garrett
