= Ed Healey =

American football player (1894–1978)

- Healey in 1922 in the green-and-white of the Rock Island Independents

No. 13, 16, 1, 19
- Positions: Tackle, guard, end

Personal information
- Born: December 28, 1894; Indian Orchard, Springfield, Massachusetts, U.S.
- Died: December 9, 1978 (aged 83); South Bend, Indiana, U.S.
- Listed height: 6 ft 1 in (1.85 m)
- Listed weight: 207 lb (94 kg)

Career information
- High school: Springfield (MA) Classical
- College: Dartmouth

Career history
- Rock Island Independents (1920–1922); Chicago Bears (1923–1927)

Awards and highlights
- 5× First-team All-Pro (1922–1926); NFL 1920s All-Decade Team; 100 greatest Bears of All-Time
- Stats at Pro Football Reference
- Pro Football Hall of Fame
- College Football Hall of Fame

Edward Francis Healey Jr. (December 28, 1894 – December 9, 1978) was an American professional football player in the National Football League (NFL). Regarded as one of the best linemen in the league's early days, Healey was inducted into the Pro Football Hall of Fame as part of its second induction class in 1964. He was also named in 1969 to the NFL 1920s All-Decade Team. In 1974, he was also inducted into the College Football Hall of Fame.

A native of Springfield, Massachusetts, Healey played college football at College of the Holy Cross in 1914 and at Dartmouth College in 1916, 1917, and 1919.

Healey played professional football as a tackle in the NFL for the Rock Island Independents from 1920 to 1922 and for the Chicago Bears from 1922 to 1927. He never played for a team with a losing record during his NFL career and, in 1922, became the first player in NFL history to be sold to another team. He was named as a first-team All Pro player by at least one selector for five consecutive years from 1922 to 1926.

== Early life and college ==
Healey was born in 1894 in Indian Orchard, a neighborhood at the northeast end of Springfield, Massachusetts. His parents, Edward F. Healey Sr. and Nora Healey were the children of Irish immigrants, both born in Massachusetts. His father worked in the street sprinkler business and later as a contractor in the wood business. Healey had four older sisters and one younger sister.

Healey attended Central High School in Springfield, Massachusetts. He then attended and played college football at the College of the Holy Cross in Worcester, Massachusetts, in 1914 and at Dartmouth College in Hanover, New Hampshire, for three years. In Healey's three years with the Dartmouth football program, the teams compiled records of 5–2–2 (1916), 5–3 (1917), and 6–1–1 (1919). Walter Camp reportedly called Healey "the best tackle I ever saw."

== Professional career ==
=== Rock Island Independents ===
Healey began playing professional football with the Rock Island Independents in 1920, the inaugural season of the National Football League (known as the American Professional Football Association until 1922). He helped lead the 1920 Rock Island team to a 6–2–2 record, good for fourth place out of 14 teams.

Healey remained with Rock Island during its 1921 season when the team compiled a 4–2–1 record and finished in fifth place out of 21 teams.

Healey began the 1922 NFL season with Rock Island. After the Islanders completed their seventh and final game of the 1922 season, a losing contest against the Chicago Bears, Independents team owner Walter Flanagan sold the contract of his star 28-year old tackle to the team that had just defeated them. Bears co-owner and starting right end George Halas later offered a colorful tale of how the deal was done.

Halas indicated that he had been blocking against Healey and did "just a wee bit of holding" in order to spring star halfback and Bears co-owner Dutch Sternaman for a 7-yard gain. "Holding!" the tough guy Healey allegedly stormed, "You were holding me, Halas! Do that again and I'll knock your block off!" The same play was run again, with Halas using the same illegal technique to generate a similar result. "I was still on my hands and knees," Halas recounted, "when some sixth sense told me to duck.... It's a darned good thing I did, by golly, for Healy's fist whizzed past my nose so fast it buried itself up to the wrist in the ground." Halas stated that "right then I decided I would rather have Healey on my side than playing against me."

As Independents owner Flanagan already owed Halas $100, Halas instead took Healey's contract to settle the debt, he said. Healey would play the last 3 games of the 1922 season with the Bears and would remain with the team for an additional five years, earning induction into the Pro Football Hall of Fame in 1964. The transaction was the first instance of an NFL player's contract being sold from one team to another.

This entertaining story, told by Halas decades after the fact, is contradicted by reporting in the Rock Island Argus at the time of the deal, however. According to the newspaper account, Healey was instead scheduled to be loaned to the Horlick-Racine Legion team for the last three games of the season. Bears co-owner Dutch Sternaman got wind of the free player loan and stepped in to offer Independents owner Flanagan $100 for use of the Healey for the duration of the year.

Provision was made in the contract giving Rock Island the option of buying Healey's contract back for 1923 for the same amount of money or having the transfer made permanent through receipt of one or more players from the Bears in trade. In any event, Healey never returned to Rock Island, remaining in Chicago for the duration of his professional football career.

Healey later recalled his pleasure at joining a team with superior facilities: "At Rock Island, we had no showers and seldom a trainer. At Wrigley Field, we had a nice warm place to dress and nice warm showers."

=== Chicago Bears ===
Healey spent six seasons with the Bears, playing the final three games of 1922 through the end of the 1927 season. During Healey's tenure with the Bears, the club never had a losing season, winning at least nine games in five of the six seasons. Healey was selected as a first-team All-Pro by at least one major selector each year from 1922 to 1926.

In 1924, he ran more than 30 yards to tackle teammate Oscar Knop who ran the wrong way after intercepting a pass. In 1925, he was the only player to be selected as a first-team All Pro by Collyers Eye magazine, the Green Bay Press-Gazette, and Joseph Carr. In 1926, the Green Bay Press-Gazette called him "the best tackle in the Pro loop," and Bears owner George Halas later called Healey "the most versatile tackle of all time".

== Family, later years, and honors ==
Healey married Lucille Falk in November 1927. After retiring from football, Healey and his wife lived in South Bend, Indiana, where he worked as a salesman and later sales manager for France Stone Company. Healey and his wife had a son, Thomas, in approximately 1938. The family later moved to Niles, Michigan.

Interviewed in 1949, Healey opined that, with the development of the platoon system, modern linemen were "something akin to sissies" and added, "In the old days we used to go on the field prepared for 60 minutes of work and nothing short of a broken leg, arm, or ankle could get us out of there."

During his retirement, Healey received numerous honors for his contributions to the sport of football. These honors include the following:

- In February 1964, Healey was elected to the Pro Football Hall of Fame as a member of its second group of inductees.
- In August 1969, he was selected by the Pro Football Hall of Fame as a tackle on the NFL 1920s All-Decade Team.
- In April 1974, Healey was also elected to the College Football Hall of Fame in the pioneer category.

Healey's wife died in September 1975. Healey died three years later in December 1978 at age 83 from multiple causes, including malnutrition, cardiac and pulmonary failure, and cancer of the stomach and lung. He died at the Cardinal Nursing Home in South Bend, Indiana. His funeral service was held in Niles, Michigan, and he was then buried at Calvary Cemetery in that city.
