= Adrian Baril =

American football player (1898–1961)

- Portrait of Baril

No. 4
- Position: Tackle / guard

Personal information
- Born: June 4, 1898; Red Lake Falls, Minnesota, U.S.
- Died: June 10, 1961 (aged 63); Detroit Lakes, Minnesota, U.S.
- Listed height: 5 ft 11 in (1.80 m)
- Listed weight: 205 lb (93 kg)

Career information
- College: St. Thomas (1919–1922)

Career history

Playing
- Minneapolis Marines (1923–1924); Minneapolis Oaks (1925); Ironwood Legion (1925); Milwaukee Badgers (1925); Orin Mason's All-Stars (1925); Rochester Aces (1926); Minneapolis Marines (1927)

Coaching
- DeLaSalle High School (1923–1925) Head coach – all sports; Hastings High School (1927–c. 1928) Assistant football coach

Career statistics
- Games played: 15 or 16 (Note: Sources conflict.)
- Games started: 12
- Stats at Pro Football Reference

Adrian George Baril (June 4, 1898 – June 10, 1961) was an American professional football player who was a tackle and guard for three seasons in the National Football League (NFL) for the Minneapolis Marines and Milwaukee Badgers. He played college football for the St. Thomas Cadets.

== Early life ==
Baril was born on June 4, 1898, in Red Lake Falls, Minnesota. His parents were French Canadians. His high school is unknown. After high school, Baril enrolled at the College of St. Thomas in St. Paul, Minnesota, in 1919. Although he did not play varsity football as a freshman that year, he made the team in 1920 and won a starting berth at tackle, which he retained for the next three seasons. He also saw playing time at end and was described in newspapers as both a "star" and "one of the best tackles ever developed at St. Thomas." Nicknamed "Toby" and "Whooping", Baril, who measured at 5 feet 11 inches (1.80 m) and 205 pounds (93 kg), was awarded varsity letters following the 1920, 1921 and 1922 football seasons. He was named to the All-State football team following the 1921 season.

In addition to playing football at St. Thomas, Baril also participated in track and field, specializing in weight events and jumping events. He also participated in basketball and tried out for the St. Thomas baseball team as an outfielder. He graduated from St. Thomas as part of the class of 1923 with a Bachelor of Arts degree.

== Professional career ==
Following Baril's graduation from St. Thomas, he signed to play professional football with the Minneapolis Marines of the National Football League (NFL) in 1923. He began practicing with the team in September and made his NFL debut in the season-opener on September 30, starting at right tackle in a 12–0 loss to the Green Bay Packers. He was the joint-fourth St. Thomas alumnus to play in the NFL, tied with Roy Vassau and Danny Coughlin. Wearing jersey number 4, he was described as one of the "well known college stars" making up the team and ended up appearing in eight or nine of their nine NFL games, eight as a starter. The Marines compiled an NFL record of 2–5–2, placing 13th in the league; they also played two non-league games, against the Minneapolis Emersons and Minneapolis All-Stars, winning both games, with Baril starting at right tackle in each.

Baril returned to the Marines for the 1924 NFL season. Re-signed in September, he retained his starting role to begin the season, starting at right tackle in their opening game against the Duluth Kelleys. He later lost his starting job, finishing the season with five NFL games played, two as a starter, as the Marines finished 16th in the league with a record of 0–6. The Marines also played three non-league games, defeating the Ironwood Legion and Minneapolis Liberties while losing to the Providence Steamrollers; Baril did not start against the Liberties, and it is unclear whether he appeared in either of the other two games.

After the Marines folded in 1925, Baril joined the independent Minneapolis Oaks in September 1925 along with several other former Marines including Rudy Tersch, John Madigan, Louie Mohs, Ainer Cleve and Bill Irgens. At the start of October, it was reported he joined the Ironwood Legion, along with several Oaks teammates including Cleve and Chuck Reichow. After a tenure of around a month with the Legion, Baril signed with the Milwaukee Badgers of the NFL. He debuted for the Badgers on November 1, 1925, in their 6–0 loss to the Green Bay Packers as a starter at right tackle. He also started the following game, a 21–0 loss to the Detroit Panthers, at left tackle. He did not appear in any further NFL games for the Badgers, as they finished the 1925 season with a record of 0–6. After his stint with the Badgers, Baril, in late November 1925, joined Orin Mason's All-Stars, which included Reichow, Tersch, Madigan, and Bobby Marshall. They played against the Minneapolis Liberties, whose lineup contained Ainer Cleve as well as Louie Pahl, among others. The game resulted in a 6–6 tie, with Baril starting at left tackle.

In 1926, Baril signed with the Liberties, which had been renamed to the Rochester Aces, joining them along with Marshall, Cleve, and Ray Suess, among others. The Minneapolis Marines were re-formed in 1927 and he returned to them, joining several former teammates including Mason and Cleve. He concluded his career with the Marines and played a total of 15 or 16 NFL games, 12 as a starter, in his professional career.

== Coaching career and later life ==
In April 1923, Baril was named the head coach of all sports at DeLaSalle High School in Minneapolis, a position he remained in even as he played in the NFL. With daily practices and "tough schedules" which Baril arranged, he helped his teams "fast round into shape". However, after two years, he announced his resignation in April 1925, being succeeded by former Illinois Fighting Illini and South Dakota State Jackrabbits athlete George C. Roberts, although Baril remained a member of the DeLaSalle faculty.

In 1927, Baril was hired by Hastings High School to be assistant football coach. He remained in the post through at least 1928. He was still with the school by 1937, although as a teacher instead of a coach. He remained in education for the rest of his life, having been a principal at a high school in St. Paul by the time of his death in 1961.

== Personal life ==
Baril was active in local sports, serving as an official for some competitions and competing in others. In August 1925, he participated in a local event and was noted for winning the "fat men's race", open to those over 200 pounds (91 kg); he also placed third in the 100-yard dash open to all. He was a member of the Knights of Columbus, for which he served as grand knight for the Hastings chapter, and the Catholic Order of Foresters, having been the director of a boys' summer camp affiliated with them. The St. Cloud Times noted him to be "a most proficient instructor and leader in scouting and all boys activities". In 1938, he received a position as "president of the alumni of the Education Club at the College of St. Thomas".

With his wife, Marguerite, Baril had at least two children. In 1942, he enlisted to serve in World War II, at the age of 43. He died on June 10, 1961, at the age of 63, at a hospital in Detroit Lakes, Minnesota, where he had been for two weeks. He was posthumously inducted into the St. Thomas Athletic Hall of Fame in 1989.
