= Ainer Cleve =

American football player (1897–1990)

No. 1, 18
- Positions: Halfback, end

Personal information
- Born: November 27, 1897; Minneapolis, Minnesota, U.S
- Died: March 23, 1990 (aged 92); Edina, Minnesota, U.S
- Listed height: 5 ft 9 in (1.75 m)
- Listed weight: 175 lb (79 kg)

Career information
- High school: South (Minneapolis)
- College: St. Thomas (MN)

Career history
- Minneapolis Marines (1921–1924)

Career statistics
- Games: 19
- Stats at Pro Football Reference

Ainer Martin Cleve (November 27, 1897 – March 23, 1990), sometimes spelled as Ainar Cleve, Einer Cleve, or Einar Cleve, was an American football player. He played professional or semi-professional football in Minnesota from at least 1920 to 1928, including 19 games as a halfback and end with the Minneapolis Marines in the early years of the National Football League (NFL).

== Early life ==
Cleve was born in Minneapolis, Minnesota, in 1897. He played high school football at South High School in Minneapolis and college football for the College of St. Thomas (now known as the University of St. Thomas).

== Professional football ==
Cleve played for the Minneapolis Marines at least as early as 1920, and continued to play professional or semi-professional football through at least 1928. From 1921 to 1924, the Marines played in the National Football League (NFL) with Cleve playing at the halfback and end positions. He appeared in 19 official NFL games, 13 as a starter, and scored two touchdowns. In a November 1923 game against the Racine Cardinals, Cleve scored the winning touchdown on a long pass described as follows: "Cleve, surrounded by three Racine players leaped into the air, grabbed the oval and raced 10 yards across the line." He also played on defense, intercepting a pass to set up a Minneapolis touchdown in December 1923.

After the Marines folded in 1925, Cleve joined the independent Minneapolis Oaks in September 1925 along with several other former Marines including Adrian Baril, Rudy Tersch, John Madigan, Louie Mohs, and Bill Irgens. At the start of October, it was reported he joined the Ironwood Legion, along with several Oaks teammates including Baril and Chuck Reichow. He also played in November 1925 for the Minneapolis Liberties.

In 1926, the Minneapolis Liberties moved to Rochester, Minnesota, and were renamed the Rochester Aces. Cleve played with the Rochester club during the 1926 season. The Rochester Post-Bulletin in September 1926 wrote:

Ainer Cleve, another veteran, has been a regular with the Minneapolis Marines for the last five years. He is a half back and triple threat man, dangerous at all times. He has a habit of skipping through an open field in nothing flat. Line plunging is his forte also, and as a battering ram Cleve is always good for several yards anywhere."

The Minneapolis Marines were re-formed in 1927 and he returned to them, joining several former teammates including Mason and Baril. The Minneapolis Journal in September 1927 called Cleve "a pillar of strength in the Marine offense the last few years."

== Family and later years ==
Cleve was the older brother of Frank Cleve, who coached the football, basketball, and baseball teams for several years at Concordia College in Moorhead, Minnesota.

Ainer Cleve died in 1990 in Edina, Minnesota.
