= Baril =

Baril may refer to:

- Adrian Baril (1898–1961), American professional football tackle and guard
- Céline Baril (born 1953), Canadian artist and film director
- Maurice Baril (born 1943), Canadian general
- Robert Baril, American stand-up comedian
- Tom Baril (born 1952), American photographer
- Baril, Yemen
