= Joe Brandy =

American football player and coach (1897–1971)

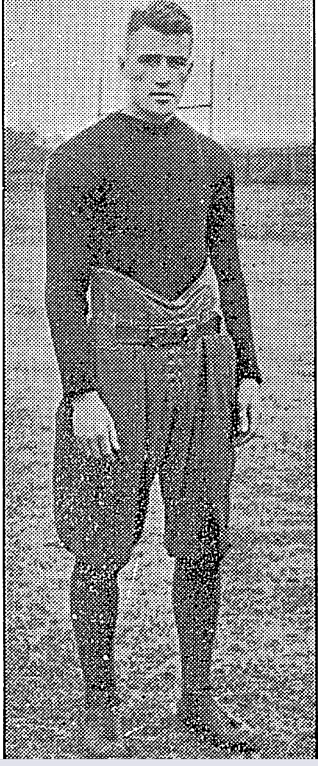
- Brandy at Notre Dame, 1920

Profile
- Positions: Quarterback, halfback

Personal information
- Born: November 6, 1897; Ogdensburg, New York, U.S.
- Died: July 20, 1971 (aged 73) near Ogdensburg, New York, U.S.

Career information
- College: Notre Dame

Career history
- 1921–1925: St. Thomas (MN)
- 1924: Minneapolis Marines
- Coaching profile at Pro Football Reference

Other information
- Military career
- Allegiance: United States
- Branch: U.S. Army
- Service years: 1917–1919
- Rank: Lieutenant
- Conflicts: World War I

Joseph Ralph Brandy (November 6, 1897 – July 20, 1971) was an American football player and coach.

After serving as a United States Army lieutenant in World War I, Brandy enrolled at the University of Notre Dame and became the starting quarterback for the Fighting Irish football team during the undefeated 1920 season—which was the final season for the legendary George Gipp prior to his death from pneumonia. Brandy was also a starting guard and a captain for the basketball team.

After graduation, Brandy accepted a position as a mathematics instructor and coach at the College of St. Thomas—now known as University of St. Thomas in Saint Paul, Minnesota for five years, directing nearly all of the athletic programs, including football, baseball, basketball, and hockey. He also spent one year in the National Football League (NFL) coaching the Minneapolis Marines in 1924.

In 1926, he returned to his hometown of Ogdensburg, New York, where he headed up the Advance News weekly newspaper for 16 years, and also coached for three seasons at the Ogdensburg Free Academy. He then founded radio station WSLB and operated it until the late 1950s, at which time he became president of the board at Claxton-Hepburn Medical Center.

Brandy died on July 20, 1971, at his summer home located on the Saint Lawrence River near Ogdensburg.

== Head coaching record ==
=== College football ===
Year	Team	Overall	Conference	Standing	Bowl/playoffs
St. Thomas Cadets (Minnesota Intercollegiate Athletic Conference) (1921–1924)
1921	St. Thomas	4–2	2–2	T–4th	
1922	St. Thomas	8–1	4–0	1st	
1923	St. Thomas	5–0	1–0	4th	
1924	St. Thomas	5–2	3–0	2nd	
St. Thomas Cadets (Independent) (1925)
1925	St. Thomas	5–2–1			
St. Thomas:		27–7–1	10–2		
Total:		27–7–1			
National championship Conference title Conference division title or championship game berth
