= Ben Dvorak =

American football player (1895–1974)

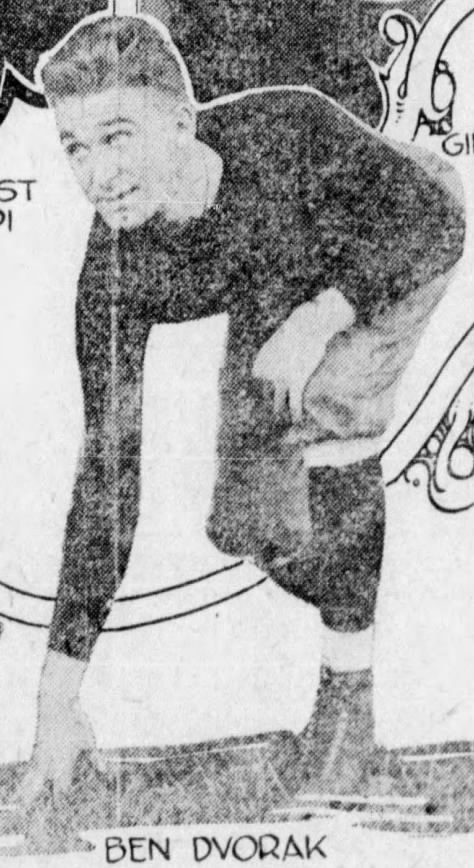
- Dvorak pictured in a 1910s newspaper

Profile
- Position: Running back

Personal information
- Born: October 21, 1895; New Prague, Minnesota, U.S.
- Died: May 7, 1974 (aged 78); Minneapolis, Minnesota, U.S.
- Listed height: 5 ft 10 in (1.78 m)
- Listed weight: 170 lb (77 kg)

Career information
- High school: New Prague
- College: Minnesota

Career history
- Minneapolis Marines (1921)

Career statistics
- Games played: 4
- Touchdowns: 2
- Stats at Pro Football Reference

Benjamin Anton Dvorak (October 21, 1895 – May 7, 1974) was an American football running back who played one season in the American Professional Football Association (APFA) for the Minneapolis Marines. He scored two touchdowns and played in four games.
