= Pete Regnier =

American football player (1896–1938)

Profile
- Positions: Wingback, halfback, quarterback

Personal information
- Born: September 10, 1896; Ghent, Minnesota, U.S.
- Died: November 30, 1938 (aged 42); Minneapolis, Minnesota, U.S.
- Listed weight: 170 lb (77 kg)

Career information
- High school: Marshall (Marshall, Minnesota)
- College: Minnesota (1919–1920)

Career history
- Minneapolis Marines (1921); Green Bay Packers (1922)

Career statistics
- Games played: 9
- Games started: 8
- Stats at Pro Football Reference

Pierre Napoleon "Pete" Regnier (September 10, 1896 – November 30, 1938) was an American football player. He played professionally in the National Football League (NFL) with the Minneapolis Marines in 1921 and with the Green Bay Packers in 1922. Regnier played college football as a quarterback at the University of Minnesota in 1919 and 1920, on teams coached by Henry L. Williams.

Regnier later practiced dentistry in Minneapolis. He died on November 30, 1938, at Abbot Hospital in Minneapolis.
