= Russell Tollefson =

American football coach (1891–1962)

Profile
- Position: Quarterback

Personal information
- Born: September 27, 1891; Minneapolis, Minnesota, U.S.
- Died: May 13, 1962 (aged 70); Glendale, California, U.S.

Career information
- College: Minnesota

Career history
- 1917–1919: Grinnell
- 1922: Minneapolis Marines
- Coaching profile at Pro Football Reference

Russell Ingwald Tollefson (September 27, 1891 – May 13, 1962) was an American football coach in the National Football League (NFL) for the Minneapolis Marines. He coached the team in 1922, posting a 5–3 overall record and a 1–3 NFL record.
