= 1922 Minneapolis Marines season =

Sports season

- Head coach: Russell Tollefson
- Home stadium: Nicollet Park

Results
- Record: 1–3
- League place: T-13th in NFL

The 1922 Minneapolis Marines season was their second in the National Football League (NFL). The team matched their previous output of 1–3, tying for thirteenth place in the league.

== Schedule ==
Game	Date	Opponent	Result	Record	Venue	Attendance	Recap	Sources
—	October 1	(open date)					—	
—	October 8	(open date)					—	
1	October 15	at Dayton Triangles	L 0–17	0–1	Triangle Park		Recap	
2	October 22	at Chicago Cardinals	L 0–3	0–2	Comiskey Park	4,000	Recap	
—	October 29	(open date)					—	
3	November 5	Oorang Indians	W 13–6	1–2	Nicollet Park		Recap	
4	November 12	at Green Bay Packers	L 6–14	1–3	Hagemeister Park	< 2,000	Recap	
—	November 19	(open date)					—	
—	November 26	(open date)					—	

== Standings ==
NFL standings
	W	L	T	PCT	PF	PA	STK
Canton Bulldogs	10	0	2	1.000	184	15	W6
Chicago Bears	9	3	0	.750	123	44	L1
Chicago Cardinals	8	3	0	.727	96	50	W1
Toledo Maroons	5	2	2	.714	94	59	L2
Rock Island Independents	4	2	1	.667	154	27	L1
Racine Legion	6	4	1	.600	122	56	L1
Dayton Triangles	4	3	1	.571	80	62	W1
Green Bay Packers	4	3	3	.571	70	54	W2
Buffalo All-Americans	5	4	1	.556	87	41	W2
Akron Pros	3	5	2	.375	146	95	L3
Milwaukee Badgers	2	4	3	.333	51	71	L3
Oorang Indians	3	6	0	.333	69	190	W2
Minneapolis Marines	1	3	0	.250	19	40	L1
Louisville Brecks	1	3	0	.250	13	140	W1
Evansville Crimson Giants	0	3	0	.000	6	88	L3
Rochester Jeffersons	0	4	1	.000	13	76	L4
Hammond Pros	0	5	1	.000	0	69	L2
Columbus Panhandles	0	8	0	.000	24	174	L8

Note: Tie games were not officially counted in the standings until 1972.

== Roster ==
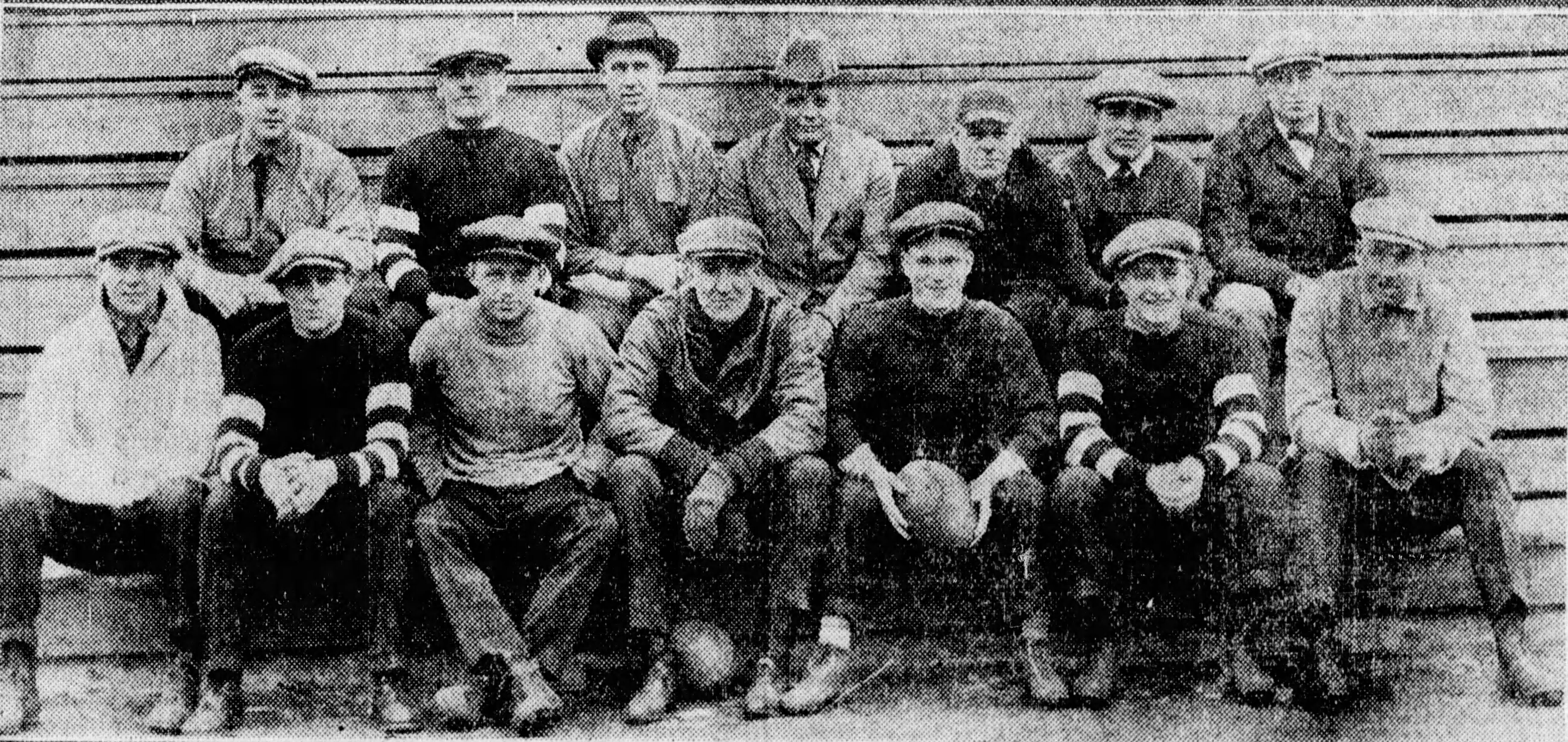
1922 Minneapolis Marines. Front row: Sampson, fullback; Terach, tackle; Kraft, end; Erickson, tackle; Irgens, halfback; Mason, utility backfield; Flynn, end. Back row: Townsend, guard; Gaustad, guard; Anderson, utility lineman; Tollefson, coach; Cleve, halfback; Norton, quarter; Mehre, center
