= Louie Pahl =

American football player (1900–1966)

Profile
- Position: Fullback

Personal information
- Born: December 15, 1900; St. Paul, Minnesota
- Died: February 1, 1966 (aged 65)
- Listed height: 5 ft 8 in (1.73 m)
- Listed weight: 185 lb (84 kg)

Career information
- High school: Central (MN)

Career history
- St. Paul Ideals (1915–1920?); Minneapolis Marines (1923–1924)

Career statistics
- Games played: 12
- Stats at Pro Football Reference

Louis W. Pahl (December 15, 1900 – March 1, 1966) was an American football player. A native of St. Paul, Minnesota, he played professional football in the National Football League (NFL) as a fullback for the Minneapolis Marines. He appeared in 11 NFL games, 10 as a starter, during the 1923 and 1924 seasons. He also played for the independent St. Paul Ideals from 1915 until at least 1920; he was captain of the team that played the Rock Island Independents in the first NFL game. (Note: Games played against non-NFL teams were counted in the standings for the 1920 season.)
