= Mike Palmer =

American football player (1890–1972)

Personal information
- Born: February 2, 1890; Columbia County, Wisconsin
- Died: March 16, 1972 (aged 82)

Career information
- College: None

Career history
- 1921: Minneapolis Marines

Major O. "Mike" Palmer (February 2, 1890 – March 16, 1972) was a player in the National Football League. He played with the Minneapolis Marines during the 1921 NFL season.
