= John Dunn (American football, born 1888) =

American football player and executive

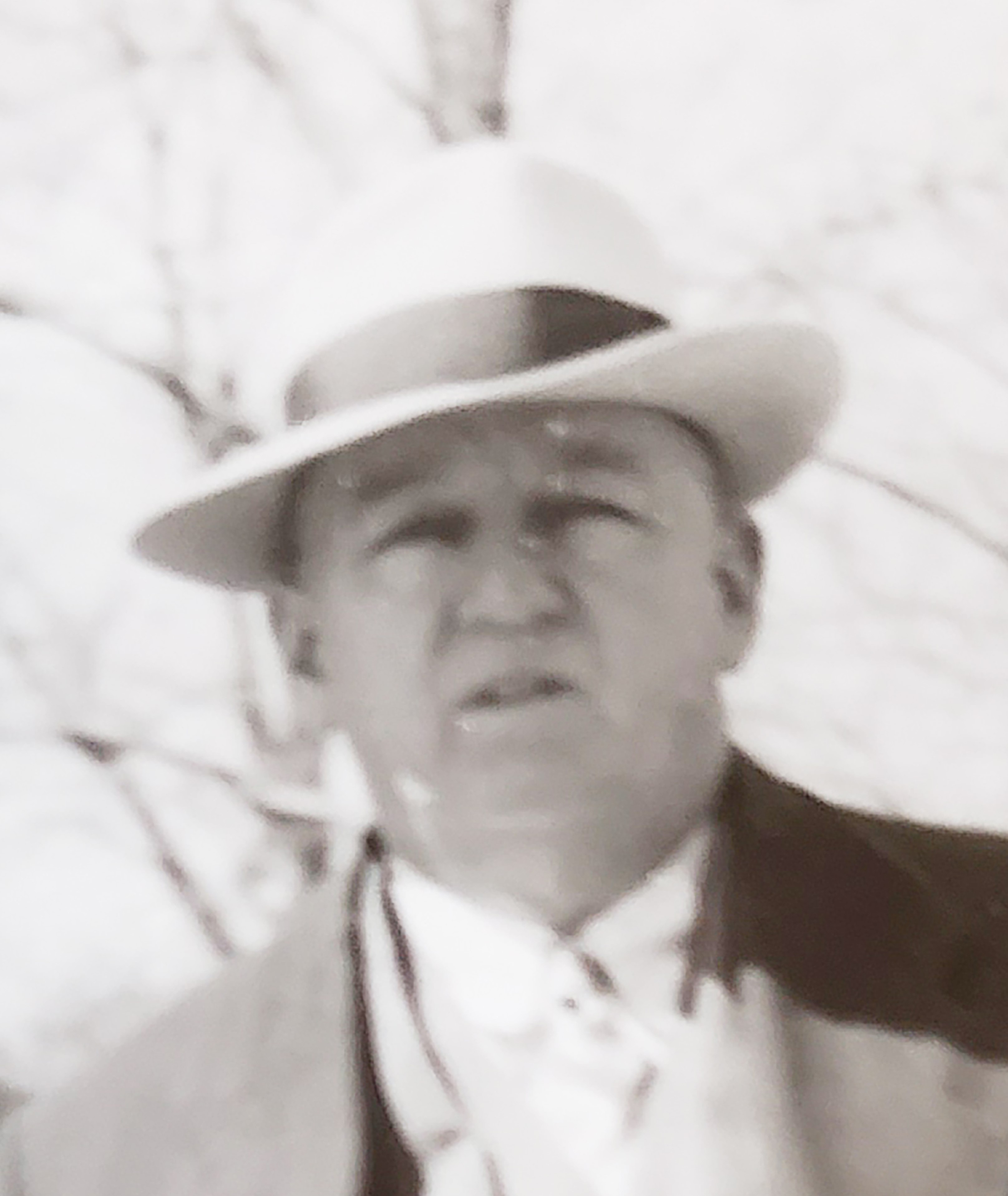
John Dunn circa 1943

John Aloysius Dunn (May 2, 1888 – June 17, 1961) was an American football player and executive. He played for the Minneapolis Marines professional football team and later was their owner and general manager when they played in the National Football League (NFL). Dunn also served as the NFL's vice president.

== Playing career ==
Before he joined the Minneapolis Marines, Dunn played halfback for the Minneapolis Cedars sandlot team from 1904 to 1906. In 1907, he joined the Marines, another sandlot team at the time, and he played mostly halfback. Dunn played with the Marines semi-professional and independent professional teams through 1919. He took over management of the team in 1915.

During World War I, Dunn volunteered to serve in the 4th Infantry of the Minnesota National Guard and played on that unit's Company B service team.

== NFL career ==
In 1921, Dunn and his business partner, Val Ness, purchased a franchise for the Marines in the American Professional Football Association (now the NFL). League owners elected Dunn vice president of the NFL in 1922, a position he would hold through the 1928 season.

Dunn and his partners entered the Minneapolis Marines into NFL competition through 1924 but then withdrew the team. From 1925 to 1928, Dunn continued to serve as vice president of the NFL while he attempted to restart the team as the Twin City Lumberjacks, or to sell his NFL franchise to other interests. In 1927 and 1928, Dunn assembled a Minneapolis Marines team to play NFL exhibition games.

In 1929, Dunn and his partners renewed their NFL franchise and renamed the team the Minneapolis Red Jackets. The team played two seasons in the NFL, and in 1930, at midseason, Dunn and his partners sold most of the player contracts to the Frankford Athletic Association who used players from both the Frankford Yellow Jackets and Minneapolis Red Jackets to play out the schedules for both teams.

== Personal life ==
The youngest of seven children, including five brothers, Dunn was the son of a Minneapolis businessman, Thomas Dunn, an Irish-born woollen mill operator who came to Minneapolis in 1869 to run the North Star Woollen Mill.

John Dunn was a bookkeeper by trade when he joined the Minneapolis Marines and later worked as a railway postal clerk for the Chicago Great Western Railway, and for several years, he was Minneapolis district superintendent of postal transportation. At some point, he started managing the Clef Camp resort near Grand Rapids, Minnesota. Dunn was vice president of the Minneapolis College of Music, while his wife, Marion, was dean of the Minnesota chapter of the American Guild of Organists.
