= Dutch Gaustad =

American football player (1889–1945)

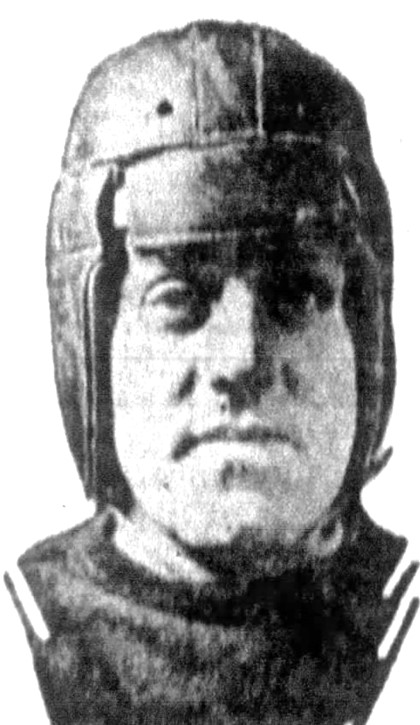
- Arthur Milleret “Dutch” Gaustad

No. 11
- Position: Guard

Personal information
- Born: June 6, 1889; Minneapolis, Minnesota
- Died: March 23, 1945 (aged 55); Minneapolis, Minnesota
- Listed weight: 212 lb (96 kg)

Career history
- Minneapolis Marines (1907–1923)
- Stats at Pro Football Reference

Arthur Millert "Dutch" Gaustad (June 6, 1889 – March 23, 1945) was an American professional football player for the Minneapolis Marines. He played mostly left guard for the Marines for 17 seasons (1906–17, 1919–23), including two years in the National Football League (NFL). He coached the team in 1906.
