= 1922 Dayton Triangles season =

Sports season

- Head coach: Carl Storck
- Home stadium: Triangle Park

Results
- Record: 4–3–1
- League place: 7th NFL

The 1922 Dayton Triangles season was their third in the National Football League (NFL). The team opened 1922 with five games at Triangle Park before finishing the year with three games on the road. The team finished with a record of 4–3–1, finishing in seventh place in the league.

== Schedule ==
Ga	Date	Opponent	Result	Record	Venue	Attendance	Recap	Sources
1	October 1	Oorang Indians	W 36–0	1–0	Triangle Park	~5,500	Recap	
2	October 8	Canton Bulldogs	T 0–0	1–0–1	Triangle Park	3,000	Recap	
3	October 15	Minneapolis Marines	W 17–0	2–0–1	Triangle Park		Recap	
4	October 22	Hammond Pros	W 20–0	3–0–1	Triangle Park		Recap	
5	October 29	Buffalo All-Americans	L 0–7	3–1–1	Triangle Park	5,000	Recap	
6	November 5	at Chicago Bears	L 0–9	3–2–1	Cubs Park	"several thousand"	Recap	
7	November 12	at Rock Island Independents	L 0–43	3–3–1	Douglas Park	1,200	Recap	
—	November 19	(open date)						
—	November 26	(open date)						
8	December 3	at Chicago Cardinals	W 7–3	4–3–1	Comiskey Park	3,000	Recap	

== Standings ==
NFL standings
	W	L	T	PCT	PF	PA	STK
Canton Bulldogs	10	0	2	1.000	184	15	W6
Chicago Bears	9	3	0	.750	123	44	L1
Chicago Cardinals	8	3	0	.727	96	50	W1
Toledo Maroons	5	2	2	.714	94	59	L2
Rock Island Independents	4	2	1	.667	154	27	L1
Racine Legion	6	4	1	.600	122	56	L1
Dayton Triangles	4	3	1	.571	80	62	W1
Green Bay Packers	4	3	3	.571	70	54	W2
Buffalo All-Americans	5	4	1	.556	87	41	W2
Akron Pros	3	5	2	.375	146	95	L3
Milwaukee Badgers	2	4	3	.333	51	71	L3
Oorang Indians	3	6	0	.333	69	190	W2
Minneapolis Marines	1	3	0	.250	19	40	L1
Louisville Brecks	1	3	0	.250	13	140	W1
Evansville Crimson Giants	0	3	0	.000	6	88	L3
Rochester Jeffersons	0	4	1	.000	13	76	L4
Hammond Pros	0	5	1	.000	0	69	L2
Columbus Panhandles	0	8	0	.000	24	174	L8

Note: Tie games were not officially counted in the standings until 1972.
