= Sheepy Redeen =

American football player (1889–1983)

Profile
- Position: End

Personal information
- Born: December 7, 1889; Minneapolis, Minnesota
- Died: August 1983 (aged 93–94); Minneapolis, Minnesota
- Listed weight: 185 lb (84 kg)

Career history
- Minneapolis Marines (1907–1921)
- Stats at Pro Football Reference

John Albert “Al” (“Sheepy”) Redeen (December 7, 1889 – August 1983) was a professional football player for the Minneapolis Marines of the National Football League. He was a member of the Marines going back to 1907, 14 years before the team entered the NFL.

In 1922, Redeen played for the 151st Field Artillery, a minor league professional team and the practice squad for the Minneapolis Marines that season.
