= Ray Suess =

American football player (1903–1970)

No. 29, 9
- Positions: Guard, tackle, end

Personal information
- Born: August 8, 1903; St. Paul, Minnesota, U.S.
- Died: August 11, 1970 (aged 67); Santa Ana, California, U.S.
- Listed weight: 204 lb (93 kg)

Career history
- Duluth Eskimos (1926–1927)

Career NFL statistics
- Games played: 16
- Stats at Pro Football Reference

Raymond R. Suess Jr. (August 8, 1903 – August 11, 1970) was an American football player.

Suess was born in St. Paul, Minnesota, in 1903 in Minnesota. He played professional football in the National Football League (NFL) as a guard, tackle, and end for Ernie Nevers' Duluth Eskimos during the 1926 and 1927 seasons. He appeared in a total of 16 NFL games, 13 as a starter. He also played for the Olympic Club football team in the 1920s.

Suess moved to Midway City, California, in the 1930s. He worked as a fire fighter from 1937 to 1968. During World War II, he was the fire chief at the Los Alamitos Naval Air Station, the U.S. Naval Hospital, Long Beach (which was destroyed in a major fire), and at the El Toro Marine Corps Air Station. He received a commendation for his work in rescuing the crew from a burning transport aircraft on February 14, 1944. After the war, he joined the Orange County Fire Department, serving for a time as the county's chief arson investigator. He eventually became Midway City's fire chief.

Suess died in 1970 at age 67 in Santa Ana, California.
