= Louie Mohs =

American football player (1896–1967)

Profile
- Positions: End, guard, tackle

Personal information
- Born: January 18, 1896; St. Cloud, Minnesota, US
- Died: August 13, 1967 (aged 71)
- Listed height: 6 ft 2 in (1.88 m)
- Listed weight: 220 lb (100 kg)

Career information
- High school: St. John's University Prep (MN)
- College: St. Thomas

Career history
- Minneapolis Marines (1922–1924)

Career NFL statistics
- Games played: 15
- Games started: 13
- Stats at Pro Football Reference

Louis M. Mohs (January 18, 1896 – August 13, 1967) was an American football player. A native of St. Cloud, Minnesota, he played college football for St. Thomas and professional football in the National Football League (NFL) as an end, guard and tackle for the Minneapolis Marines. He appeared in 15 NFL games, 13 as a starter, from 1922 to 1924.
