= Bill Irgens =

American football player (1883–1947)

Profile
- Positions: Halfback, quarterback

Personal information
- Born: June 26, 1883; Stavanger, Norway
- Died: October 28, 1947 (aged 64); Hennepin County, Minnesota
- Listed height: 5 ft 8 in (1.73 m)
- Listed weight: 175 lb (79 kg)

Career history
- Minneapolis Marines (1921–1923)

Career statistics
- Games: 11
- Stats at Pro Football Reference

Einar Magnus "Bill" Irgens (June 26, 1883 – October 28, 1947) was an American football player.

A native of Stavanger, Norway, he played professional football in the National Football League (NFL) as a halfback and quarterback for the Minneapolis Marines. He appeared in 11 NFL games, seven as a starter, from 1921 to 1923.

Sav Rocca is sometimes cited as the oldest NFL rookie at age 34. Irgens tops Rocca's mark by four years, having made his NFL debut at age 38.

Irgens was also the first Norwegian-born player in the NFL. The second Norwegian-born player, Halvor Hagen, did not debut in the NFL until 1975.

In later years, Irgens worked as a painter in Minneapolis. He died in 1947 in Minneapolis.
