= Rudy Tersch =

American football player (1894–1970)

Profile
- Positions: Tackle, guard

Personal information
- Born: November 20, 1894; Minneapolis, Minnesota, U.S.
- Died: February 6, 1970 (aged 75); Hennepin County, Minnesota, U.S.
- Listed weight: 195 lb (88 kg)

Career history
- Minneapolis Marines (1921–1923)

Career statistics
- Games: 15

Rudolph James Tersch (November 20, 1894 – February 6, 1970) was an American football player, baseball coach, and deputy fire chief. He played professional football for the Minneapolis Marines of the National Football League (NFL) from 1921 to 1923. He served in the Minneapolis Fire Department from 1917 to 1959, retiring as first deputy chief.

== Early life ==
Tersch was born in Minneapolis in 1894. He joined the Minneapolis Fire Department in 1917 at age 23. He joined the U.S. Navy that same year when the United States entered World War I.

== Professional football ==
Tersch played semi-professional football for 14 years. He also played professional football in the National Football League (NFL) as a tackle and guard for the Minneapolis Marines. He appeared in 15 NFL games, all as a starter, from 1921 to 1923.

== Later life ==
Tersch He also returned to the Navy for three-and-a-half years during World War II, serving as a fire marshal in Japan and Pearl Harbor. He also served as the coach of the fire-police baseball team from the 1920s until the early 1950s. In 1959, he was promoted from second deputy to first deputy chief of the Minneapolis Fire Department. He retired in November 1959 at age 65.

Tersch died in 1970 at Northwestern Hospital in Minneapolis at age 75.
