= Chuck Reichow =

American football player (1901–1983)

Profile
- Position: Fullback

Personal information
- Born: March 19, 1901; Saint Paul, Minnesota
- Died: March 29, 1993 (aged 92); Peoria, Arizona
- Listed height: 5 ft 9 in (1.75 m)
- Listed weight: 183 lb (83 kg)

Career information
- College: St. Thomas

Career history
- Milwaukee Badgers (1925); Racine Tornadoes (1926)

Career statistics
- Games played: 7
- Stats at Pro Football Reference

Chuck Reichow (March 19, 1901 – March 29, 1993) was a fullback in the National Football League. He played with the Milwaukee Badgers during the 1925 NFL season before playing the following season with the Racine Tornadoes.
