= Minneapolis Marines/Red Jackets =

Defunct American football team

Minneapolis Marines / Red Jackets
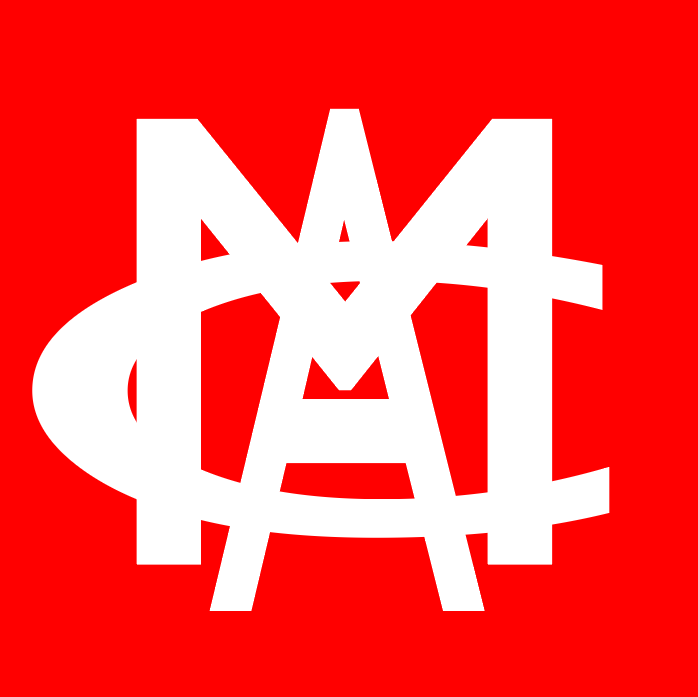
Logo

General information
- Founded: 1905
- Folded: 1930
- Stadium: North Minneapolis Athletic Association grounds (1912–1914); Nicollet Park (1915–1930)
- Headquartered: Minneapolis, Minnesota
- Colors: Red, White (1905–1928) Red, Red (1929–1930)

Personnel
- Owners: Marine Athletic Club (1905–1920); John Dunn (1921–1930); Val Ness (1921–1930)
- General manager: Oscar Benson (1905); Ernest Windblad (1906); Morris Johnson (1907); Archie Hoffman (1908); Einar M. Irgens (1909); Frank Hammer (1910–1914); John Dunn (1915–1917, 1919–1924, 1927–1930)
- Head coach: Unknown (1905, 1907–1911); Dutch Gaustad (1906); Reuben Ursella (1912, 1917, 1921); Ossie Solem (1913–1915); Russell Tollefson (1916, 1920, 1922); Harry Mehre (1923); Joe Brandy (1924); Bert Baston (1927); Herb Joesting (1928–1929); Sigmund Harris (1929); George Gibson (1930)

Nicknames
- Marines (1905–1928); Red Jackets (1929–1930)

Team history
- Minneapolis Marines (1905–1928); Minneapolis Red Jackets (1929–1930)

League / conference affiliations
- sandlot (1905–1909) semi-professional (1910–1912) independent professional (1913–1917, 1919–20); National Football League (1921–1924, 1929–1930) exhibition (1927–28)

The Minneapolis Marines were an early professional football team that existed from 1905 until 1928. The team did not play in 1918 or 1925 to 1926 and was later resurrected from 1929 to 1930 under the Minneapolis Red Jackets name. The Marines were originally owned by the Marine Athletic Club of Minneapolis and later by Minneapolitans John Dunn and Val Ness. The Marines played their earliest games in the sandlots of Minneapolis and at Minnehaha Park. They made their first appearance at Lexington Park in 1909 and Nicollet Park in 1910. From 1912 to 1914, the team rented the North Minneapolis Athletic Association grounds at 25th Avenue North and Washington Avenue in Minneapolis, a site now overrun by Interstate 94. The Marines moved to Nicollet Park in 1915 and played there until they disbanded as the Red Jackets in 1930. The Minneapolis Marines were the first Minnesota-based team to join the National Football League, predating the Duluth Eskimos (1923) and Minnesota Vikings (1961).

== History ==
=== Origins ===
Henry Harrison "Pecky" Rhoades formed the Marines baseball team in 1905, and in that same year, some players decided to form a Marines football team, too. The teams shared some players and managers until 1912, when the Marines baseball team played its final game. Rhoades left the amateur Marines baseball team in 1910 to play professional baseball.

Early on, the Marines baseball and football teams featured working-class teenagers, mostly first-generation Scandinavian-Americans from the Cedar-Riverside, Minneapolis neighborhood.

The meaning of the Marines nickname, whether it referred to the United States Marine Corps, to the merchant fleet, or to life on the water in the lakes of Minnesota, is unknown. One player from the team later recollected that the Marines had adopted the nickname from another, defunct youth baseball team in the Prospect Park neighborhood in Minneapolis. The widely held assumption is that the Marines refer to their military antecedent.

=== Sandlots (1905–1909) ===
From 1905 to 1909 the Marines football team played in the sandlots, first in the self-reported 115-pound weight class, and by 1909 in the 140-pound weight class, considered heavyweight at the time. The Marines claimed the championship in the 130-pound weight class in 1908. Minnehaha Park served as the premiere venue for sandlot teams in Minneapolis at this time.

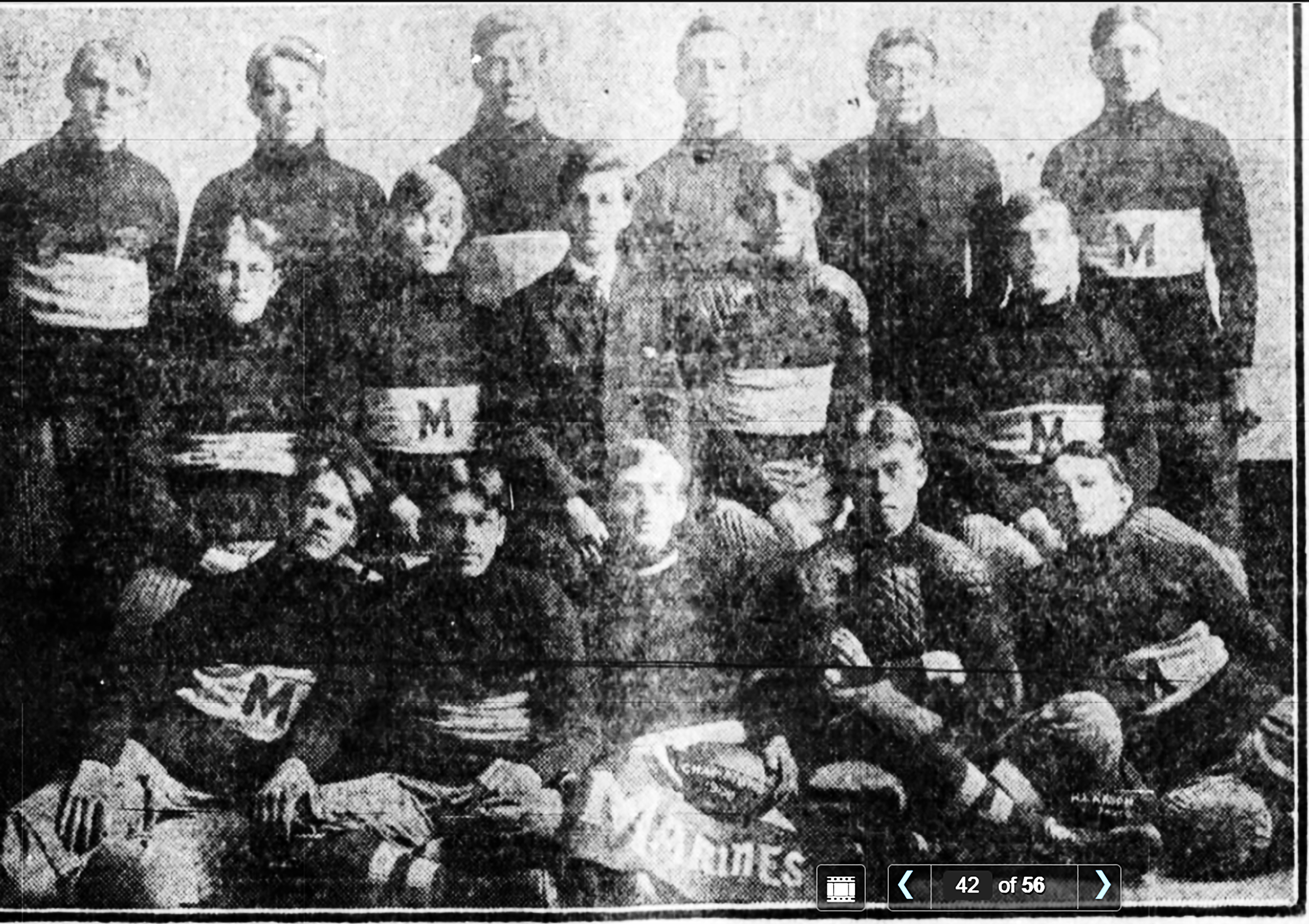
The Minneapolis Marines sandlot football team of 1908, champions in the 130-lbs. weight class

The team's main sandlot rival was the Indians, a team managed by Einar M. Irgens, a Norwegian immigrant who had been involved with independent football in Minneapolis since 1898 when he first played guard for the Lincoln Athletic Club. The Indians also featured future boxer, Labe Safro. Irgens took over management of the Marines for a season in 1909 and Safro joined the Marines as a fullback that same year, and the Marines started a new inter-city rivalry with the St. Paul Laurels.

During this sandlot period from 1905 to 1909, six players who joined the Marines would later play in the National Football League, including Dutch Gaustad, Walt Buland, Sheepy Redeen, Reuben Ursella, Charles Jonasen, and Mike Palmer. One Marines player, John Dunn, would go on to serve as team's manager, NFL franchise owner, and NFL vice president.

The Marines would only have players on the team with no high school or college playing experience until 1912 when Harold Costello, a law student who had captained the St. Mary's College football team in St. Mary's, Kansas, joined the squad.

=== A Professional Team ===
The Minneapolis Beavers, not the Marines, were the biggest independent football attraction in Minneapolis through 1909, but that would soon change. In September 1910, the Marines selected Frank J. Hammer, an apprentice in the newspaper trade, to be the team's new manager. Under Hammer, the team took steps toward professionalism by demanding prize purses for games and later by holding fundraisers for the team. It appears that this transition also coincided with the formation of the Marine Athletic Club, (first mentioned in 1910 in relation to the Marines baseball team), a subsidiary of the Metropolitan Social Club at 300 Cedar Avenue in Minneapolis, which oversaw athletics for member-players. In November 1910, the Marines beat the Laurels at Lexington Park and the Beavers at Nicollet Park to claim the title of Twin Cities Champions.

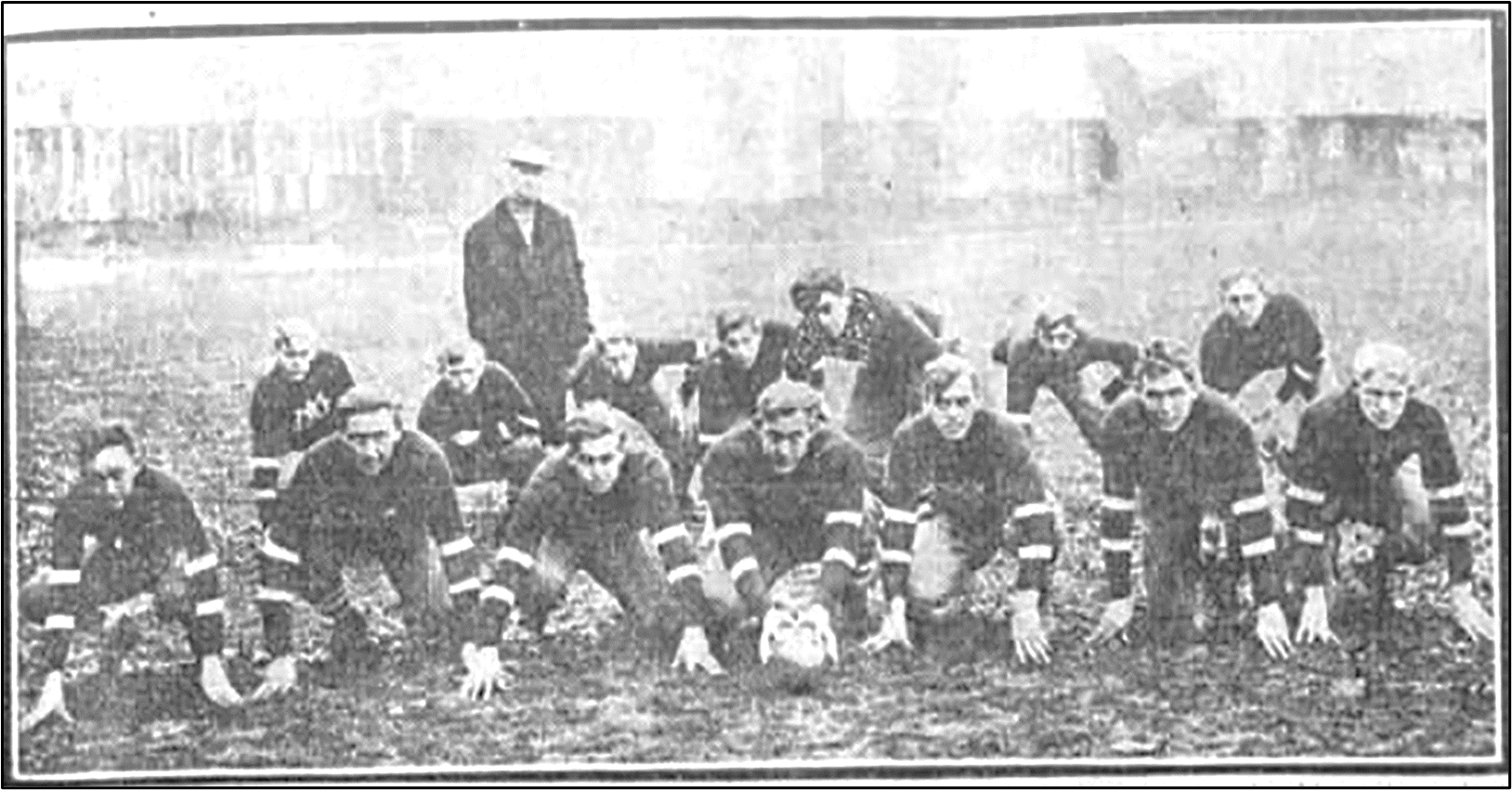
The 1911 Minneapolis Marines semi-professional football team

In 1911, for the first time, the Marines began to use the Minnesota Shift, an offensive tactic first employed by Coach Henry L. Williams at the University of Minnesota the year before. The Marines would outscore opponents 123 to 11 that season but would finish as the runner-up to the Beavers for the Minneapolis championship. In 1912, the Marines rented a home venue, the North Minneapolis Athletic Association grounds at the intersection of 25th Avenue North and Washington Ave in Minneapolis. The Marines sold tickets and operated professionally as a cooperative and they outscored opponents 293 to 37, but still they finished second to the Beavers and missed out on playing the inaugural Thanksgiving Day matchup between the best independent team in the city versus the Minnesota All-Stars, an exhibition team rostered with mostly former University of Minnesota Gophers players.

=== "The Pride of the Northwest" ===
In 1913, nearly a dozen teams competed in football in the heavyweight class in Minneapolis, and while most teams included former college players, the Marines remained a team of working men with little high school and no college experience. But then before a game against the Adams Athletic Club of Duluth, Minnesota, Hammer recruited former Gophers phenom Bobby Marshall to play for the Marines. Marshall would be the first player with major college football experience to play for the club. Hammer then hired former Gophers player Ossie Solem to coach the Marines, and he recruited a professional baseball and basketball player named Fred Chicken to play fullback for the Marines. The Marines beat the Adams team and the Beavers twice and earned the title Minnesota Champions and the opportunity to play the All-Stars on Thanksgiving Day.

The Marines would finish as the state champions from 1913 to 1917 and play the All-Stars for nine consecutive matchups, from 1913 to 1916 and from 1919 to 1923. (The All-Stars did not play in 1917 and 1918.)

After the Marines made Nicollet Park their new home venue in 1915 and started playing teams from outside Minnesota, the Marines increased their ranks by absorbing players from the Beavers. After they established a new local rivalry with the Minneapolis East Ends, the Marines absorbed players from that team, too. Three more future NFL players joined the team, including Harry Gunderson, Art Sampson, and Eddie Novak. Newspapers dubbed the Marines the Northwest Champions and also the "Pride of the Northwest" from 1915 to 1917.

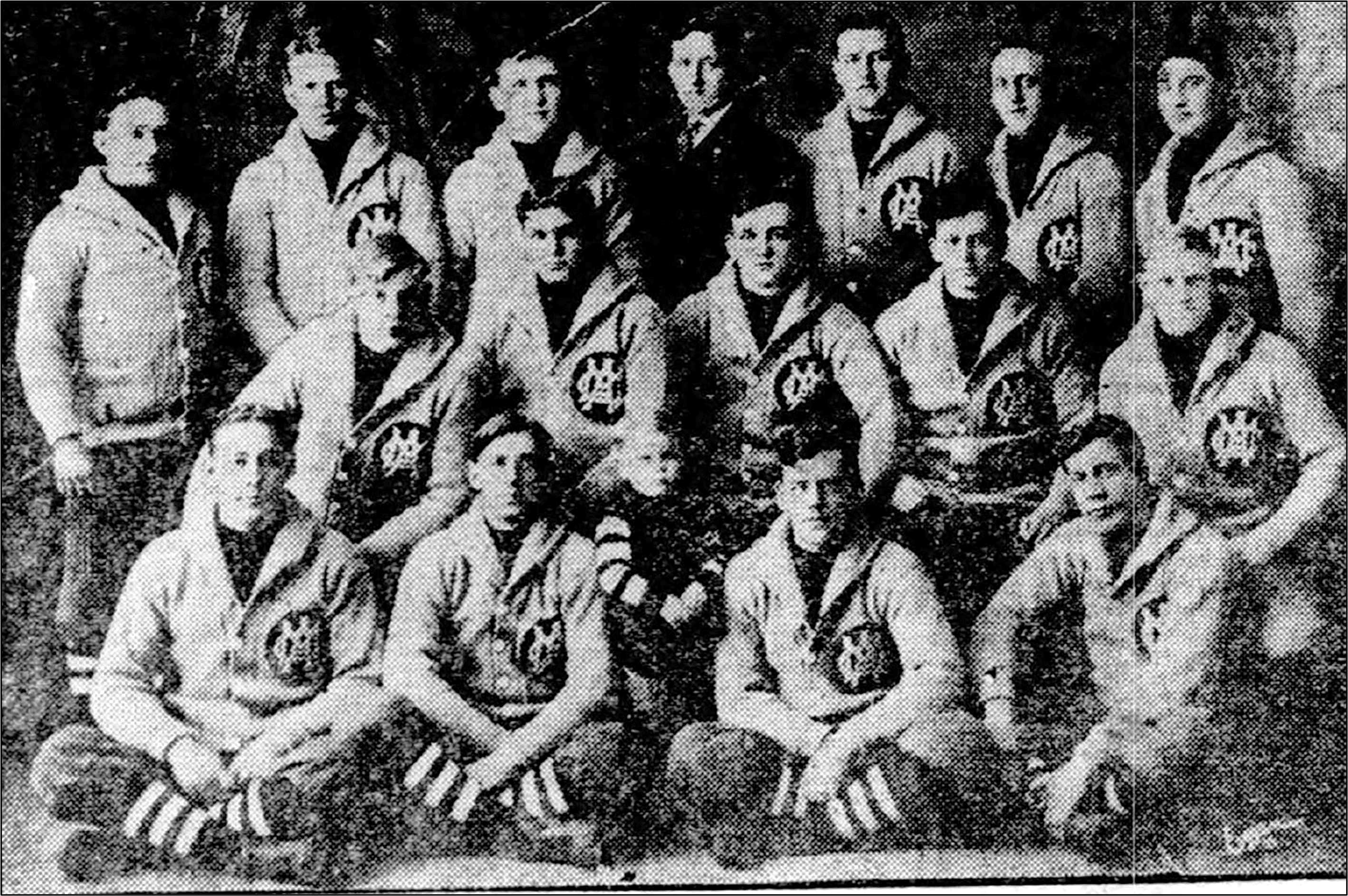
The Minneapolis Marines independent professional football team in 1917

Across seven seasons, from 1911 to 1917, the Marines would use the Minnesota Shift to outscore opponents 1,539 to 156, nearly a 10:1 ratio.

=== World War I ===
The United States declared war on Germany in April 1917 to during World War I, and by 1918 several key members of the Marines football team had enlisted, which depleted the team's roster. John Dunn, who had taken over management of the Marines in 1915, joined the Minnesota National Guard, but still he attempted to field a team. However, the flu pandemic prevented the Marines from taking the field. Meanwhile, a few members of the Marines played on service teams.

=== Post-war Marines ===
After the war, several Marines players who had played as ringers for the Rock Island Independents and the Davenport Athletics in 1917 chose to play for Rock Island, instead. The men who departed the Marines for the Independents in 1919 included Reuben Ursella, Walt Buland, Fred Chicken, Dewey Lyle, Bobby Marshall, and Eddie Novak. In 1920, two more Marines players, Harry Gunderson and Frank Jordan, left to play for Rock Island. Marines manager John Dunn backfilled the team with more former East Ends players and also former members of the Arrows, a team sponsored by the Citizens Club in Minneapolis. Six new future NFL players joined the team, including Rudy Tersch, Larry "Sox" Erickson, John Norbeck, Oscar "Bully" Christianson, Ainer Cleve, Harold D. Hanson, and Frank Jordan. The Marines enjoyed a 10–2–4 overall record from 1919 to 1920 on schedules that included games against the Hammond All-Stars in 1919 and the Decatur Staleys in 1920.

=== The Marines in the NFL ===
In 1920, John Dunn decided to stop playing and instead focus on managing the team, and in 1921, he sought to join a new western professional league based in Omaha, Nebraska. When that league never materialized, Dunn and a business partner, Val Ness, (who had played for the Marines in 1919), secured a franchise for the team in the National Football League. Dunn then recruited Reuben Ursella to play and coach the team, and he beefed up the Marines backfield by recruiting two former Gophers players Pete Regnier and Ben Dvorak. The Marines won the first NFL game they ever played at Nicollet Park when they beat the Columbus Panhandles 28–0, but overall from 1921 to 1924, the Marines won only four games and finished 4–18–2 in the NFL (15–21–2 overall including non-NFL opponents). Other coaches during this period included Russell Tollefson, who had coached the Marines in 1916, and former Gophers player Gus Ekberg as Tollefson's assistant. Harry Mehre played and coached in 1923, and Joe Brandy coached in 1924.

John Dunn was elected vice president of the National Football League in 1922, but after posting an 0–6 record in 1924, Dunn folded the team, yet he retained the franchise and his position as vice president. He would serve in that role through the 1928 NFL season.

=== The Marines in limbo ===
By 1924, interest in pro football in Minneapolis had declined significantly, in no small part because the University of Minnesota Gophers football team had opened a new half-a-million-dollar, horseshoe-shaped venue dubbed Memorial Stadium that seated up to 52,000 fans. On average, the Gophers drew over 23,000 fans per game that first season in the new venue, and the Marines could not compete for fan interest. As a result, John Dunn tried to drum up support to move the team to Rochester, Minnesota, in 1925, but that effort failed.

In 1926, John Dunn and Val Ness teamed up with boxing promoter Jack Reddy in an effort to revive the NFL franchise under a new name, the Twin City Lumberjacks. Dunn signed several players for the team, including former Gophers captain Carl L. Lidberg and three former College of St. Thomas players, Chuck Reichow, Jack Murray, and Walt Kiesling. Former Marines coach Joe Brandy would coach the new team, and the effort depended on Brandy financially investing in the team. When the group failed to pay the NFL franchise fee for the 1926 season, reportedly because Brandy pulled out of the deal, the effort fell apart.

=== An exhibition team ===
Still inactive as an NFL franchise, the Marines returned to the field to play exhibition games in 1927 and 1928. The Marines hosted Red Grange and his New York Yankees NFL franchise in 1927, and in 1928, John Dunn revived the Marines as a vehicle to feature former Gophers standout Herb Joesting who, despite finishing his college career setting new school rushing records of 1,850 career yards and 23 touchdowns, received disappointing offers from professional football teams. Joesting and the Marines played games against the Green Bay Packers and Chicago Bears.

=== The Red Jackets ===
In late May 1928, Herb Joesting announced he would captain and manage an entrant in the NFL with former Gophers player Ken Haycraft as his assistant. He promised the team would be an "all-college aggregation," unlike previous attempts to field an NFL team in Minneapolis. Behind the scenes, Dunn and Ness paid the NFL franchise fee for 1928 to revive the team as the Minneapolis Red Jackets, a name that perhaps continued the military theme that Dunn had adopted, first with the Marines, a name he inherited, and later with the 151st Field Artillery, the name for his minor league football team and practice squad. It is conceivable that the name “Red Jackets” may have been inspired by the 1st Minnesota Infantry Regiment that fought in the American Civil War and wore red shirts. As a football team, the Red Jackets wore red helmets, red jerseys, red pants, and red socks. On the sideline, the Red Jackets wore hooded coats in the same color.

Outside of Joesting, the most accoladed player to join the Red Jackets was Hal Erickson, who had played in two Rose Bowl games and later for the Milwaukee Badgers and Chicago Cardinals. Meanwhile, Reuben Ursella rejoined the team, in part to signify continuity with the original Marines team.

The Red Jackets practiced at the Parade Grounds, the future home of Parade Stadium, and at some point during the season, Joesting sought out Sigmund Harris, who had worked as an assistant coach at the University of Minnesota for 22 years, to assist with coaching the Red Jackets.

The Red Jackets finished 1–9 in the NFL in 1929 (3–9 including non-NFL games), and so for 1930, John Dunn recruited former Gophers captain George Gibson, who had worked as an assistant for coach Clarence Spears at the University of Minnesota, to coach and play for the Red Jackets. Gibson traveled to California where he recruited former University of Southern California linemen Nate Barrager, John Ward, and Tony Steponovich to play for the Red Jackets. Meanwhile, Dunn attempted to recruit former Gophers player Bronko Nagurski to play for the home team, but Nagurski found better offers elsewhere and signed with the Chicago Bears.

Dunn and Ness sold season tickets for their team for the first time in 1930, and while the Red Jackets' game versus Nagurski and the Bears drew a crowd, the Red Jackets only won one game in 1930 against the Portsmouth Spartans. After a loss to the Chicago Bears at Wrigley Field on November 2, and after the Frankford Yellow Jackets lost to the Chicago Cardinals at Comiskey Park that same day, Dunn sold most of his franchise's player contracts to Frankford and sold three player contracts to the Green Bay Packers. It's not clear whether Dunn and Ness had sold the franchise per se to Frankford, because later reports indicated they still had a stake in the league. Either way, the Frankford Athletic Association would oversee finishing the schedule for both the Yellow Jackets and the Red Jackets, and for the remainder of the 1930 season, the manager and coaches of Frankford A. A. would use players from both rosters to play in Yellow Jackets and Red Jackets games. A total of twenty players including ten original Red Jackets and ten original Yellow Jackets jumped back-and-forth between both teams, and in the case of the original Red Jackets, three players, Gibson, Barrager, and Joesting, appeared in every single Red Jackets and Yellow Jackets game after November 2. The Red Jackets finished the season with a 1–7–1 NFL record (3–7–1 including non-NFL games).

Minneapolis would not hold another NFL franchise for the next three decades, before the Minnesota Vikings debuted in 1961.

== First pro football minor league team and practice squad ==
In 1922, while the Marines struggled in the NFL, John Dunn and Val Ness fielded a second team, the semi-professional 151st Field Artillery, the “soldiers,” which played at Nicollet Park during Marines away games. The team played in a new Twin City football league with five other semi-professional teams. The 151st Field Artillery would serve as a practice squad for the Marines. The team's name paid homage the 151st Field Artillery Regiment from Minnesota, which had fought valiantly in the 42nd “Rainbow” Infantry Division during World War I. The 151st Field Artillery played the pre-NFL Duluth Kelleys at Athletic Park in Duluth and then ended its season in late October after a handful of games.

== First pro football training camp ==
By 1927, the Dunn family had started spending their summers at Clef Camp, a resort on Lake Pokegama southwest of Grand Rapids, Minnesota. When John Dunn and Val Ness decided to revive their NFL franchise as the Minneapolis Red Jackets, Dunn hit on the idea of using Clef Camp as a training camp for the Red Jackets players. The team assembled in Minneapolis in late summer and traveled together to camp where they engaged in two-a-day practices at 10:00 a.m. and 2:30 p.m. The two-week training camp included a training table and conditioning that included swimming and running and daily practices at Grand Rapids High School.

== Season-by-season (non-NFL) ==
	Year	W	L	T	Finish	Coach
Marines	1905	3	0	0	–	–
Marines	1906	1	1	1	–	Dutch Gaustad
Marines	1907	4	0	3	–	–
Marines	1908	6	0	0	130 lbs. Minneapolis Champions	–
Marines	1909	4	1	0	–	–
Marines	1910	6	0	1	Twin Cities Champions	–
Marines	1911	4	1	1	Minneapolis Runner-up	–
Marines	1912	7	2	0	Minneapolis Runner-up	Reuben Ursella
Marines	1913	8	1	0	Minnesota Champions	Ossie Solem
Marines	1914	6	1	0	Minnesota Champions	Ossie Solem
Marines	1915	6	1	0	"Northwest Champions"	Ossie Solem
Marines	1916	8	0	1	"Northwest Champions"	Russell Tollefson
Marines	1917	7	0	0	"Northwest Champions"	Reuben Ursella
Marines	1918	–	–	–	–	–
Marines	1919	5	1	2	–	Jimmie Rush
Marines	1920	5	1	2	–	Russell Tollefson
Marines	1927	0	1	0	–	Bert Baston
Marines	1928	0	2	0	–	Herb Joesting

== Season-by-season (NFL seasons only) ==
	Year	W	L	T	Finish	Coach
Marines	1921	1	3	1	13th	Reuben Ursella
Marines	1922	1	3	0	12th	Russell Tollefson
Marines	1923	2	5	2	13th	Harry Mehre
Marines	1924	0	6	0	16th	Joe Brandy
Red Jackets	1929	1	9	0	11th	Herb Joesting
Red Jackets	1930	1	7	1	10th	George Gibson
